= Treasure of Begram =

Ancient carvings from Afghanistan

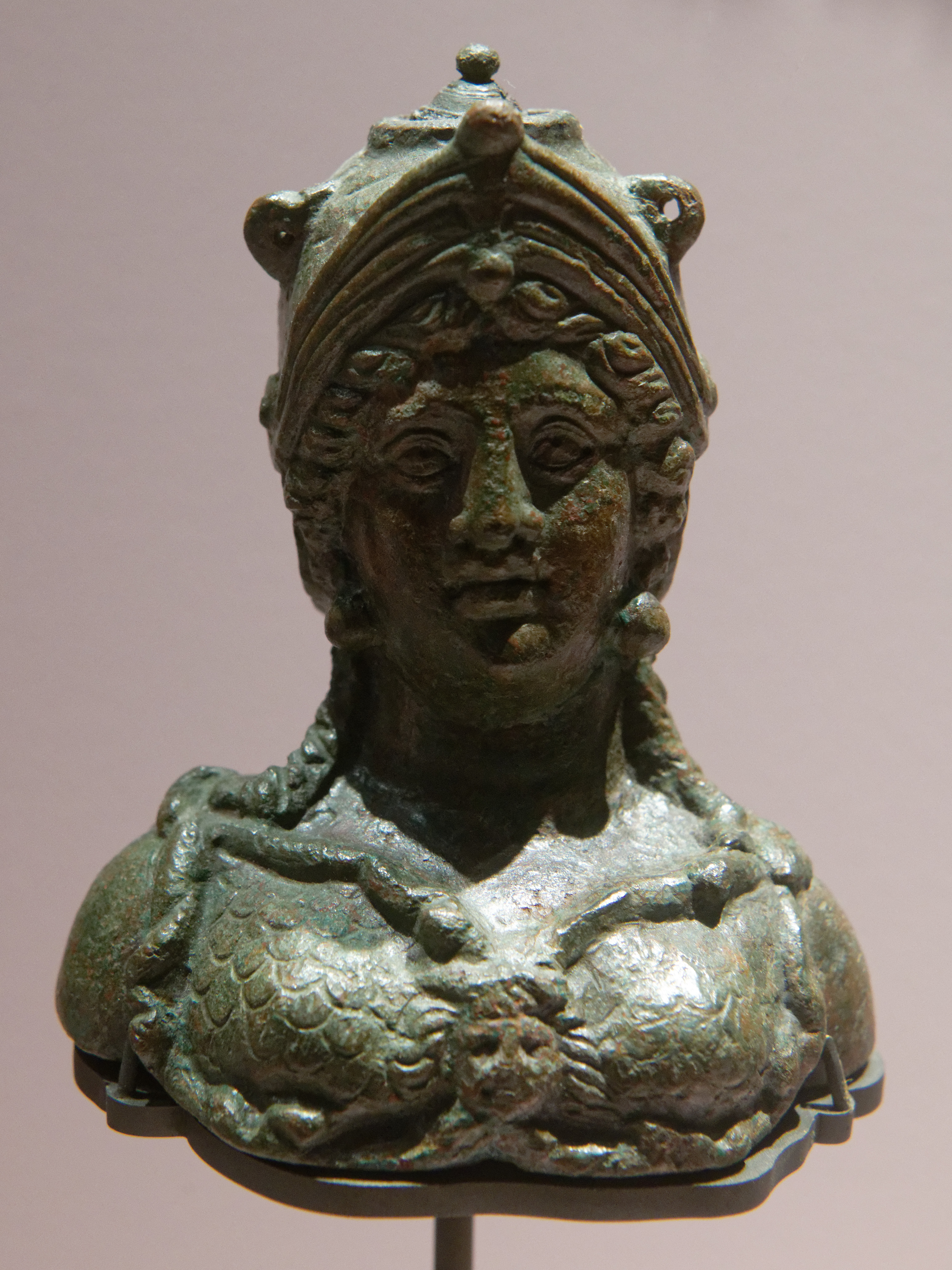
- Helmeted Athena, Treasure of Begram, Guimet Museum (MG19073)
- Period/culture: 1st or 2nd century CE
- Discovered: 34.966667°N 69.300000°E
- Place: Bagram (Begram), Afghanistan.

The Treasure of Begram or Begram Hoard is a group of artifacts from the 1st-2nd century CE discovered in the area of Begram, Afghanistan. The French Archaeological Delegation in Afghanistan (DAFA) conducted excavations at the site between 1936 and 1940, uncovering two walled-up strongrooms, Room 10 and Room 13. Inside, a large number of bronze, alabaster, glass (remains of 180 pieces), coins, and ivory objects, along with remains of furniture and Chinese lacquer bowls, were unearthed. Some of the furniture was arranged along walls, other pieces stacked or facing each other. In particular, a high percentage of the few survivals of Greco-Roman enamelled glass come from this discovery.

The Begram ivories are a sub-group of over a thousand decorative plaques, small figures and inlays, carved from ivory and bone, and formerly attached to wooden furniture. They are rare and important exemplars of Kushan art of the 1st or 2nd centuries CE, attesting to the cosmopolitan tastes and patronage of local dynasts, the sophistication of contemporary craftsmanship, and to the ancient trade in luxury goods.

== History ==
The ancient city of Kapisa (near modern Bagram), in Bactria was the summer capital of the Kushan Empire, which stretched from northern Afghanistan to northwest India between the 1st and the 4th centuries. Some eighty miles from Kabul, the strategically located city dominated two passes through the Hindu Kush, connecting Bactria with Gandhara (modern north-east Pakistan.

The finds were divided, in accordance with the system of partage, between the Musée Guimet and the National Museum of Afghanistan in Kabul. After the Kabul Museum closed in 1978 the whereabouts of the ivories was uncertain, and many items were looted in the 1990s.

A number of the missing items were located in 2004, and a further group of twenty pieces, illicitly traded by antiquities dealers, was later recovered and is to be repatriated. After conservation treatment in the British Museum they were exhibited there in 2011.

== Major artifacts ==
=== Glass ===
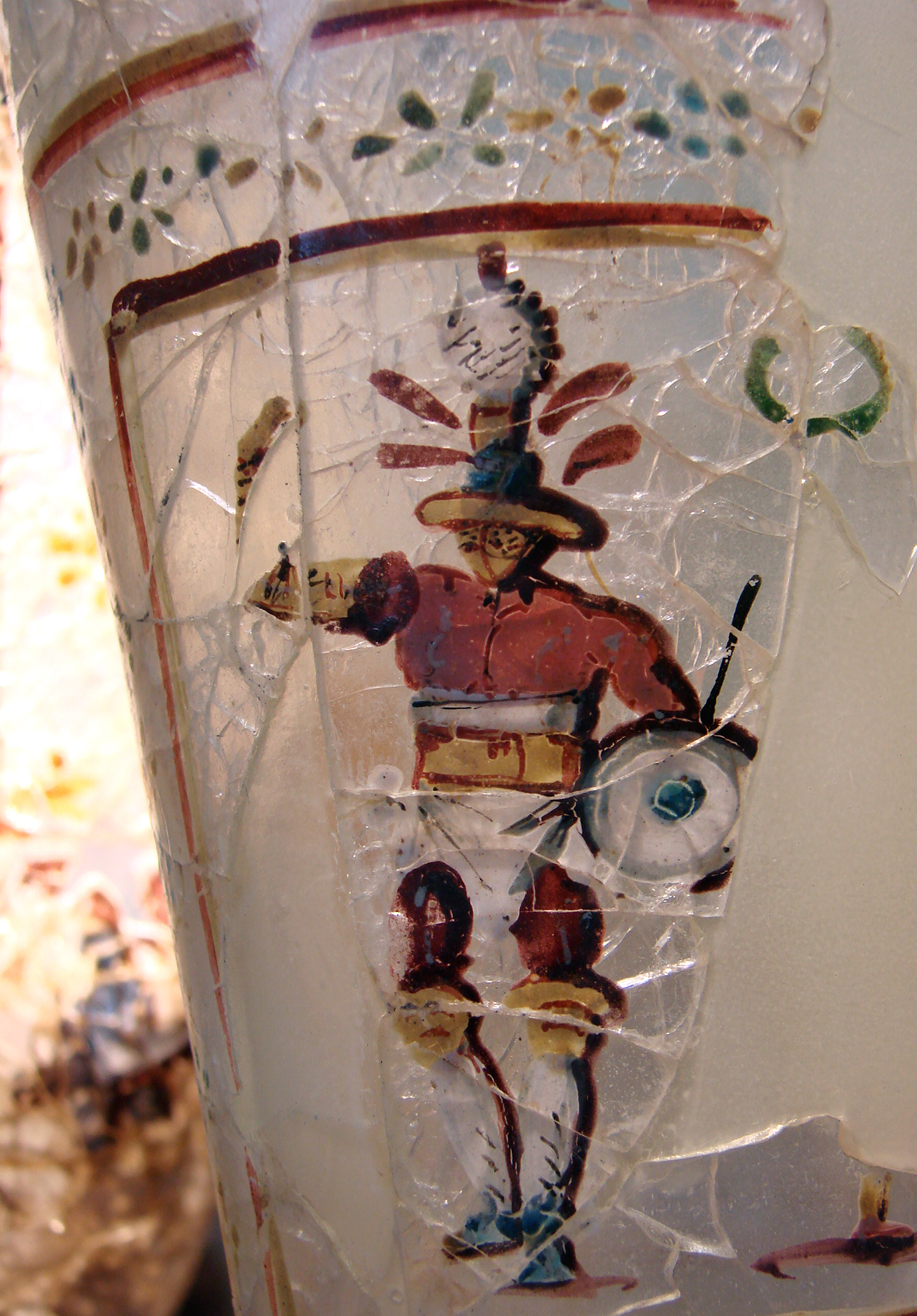
Glass with painting of a Roman gladiator.

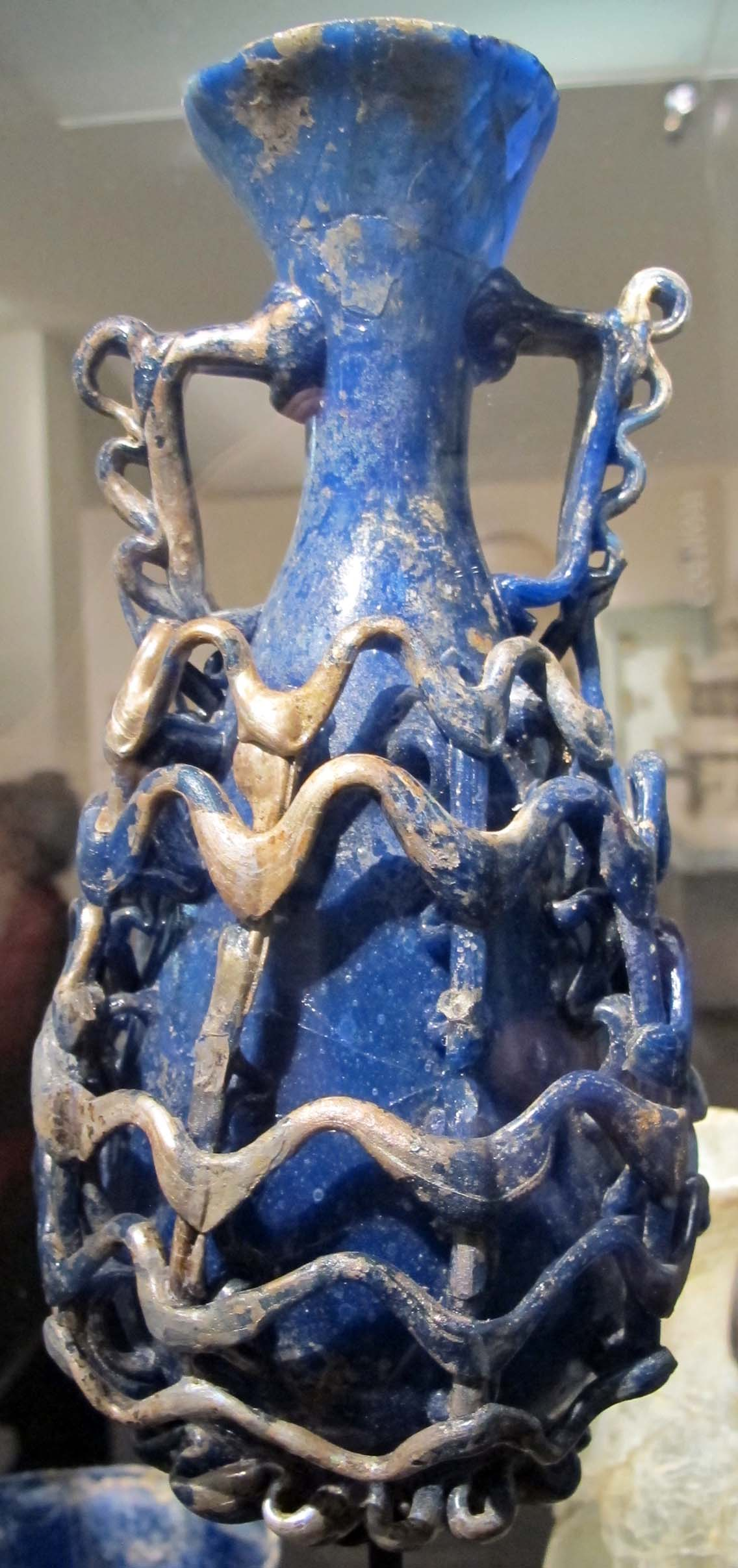
Blue bottle with amphora shape.

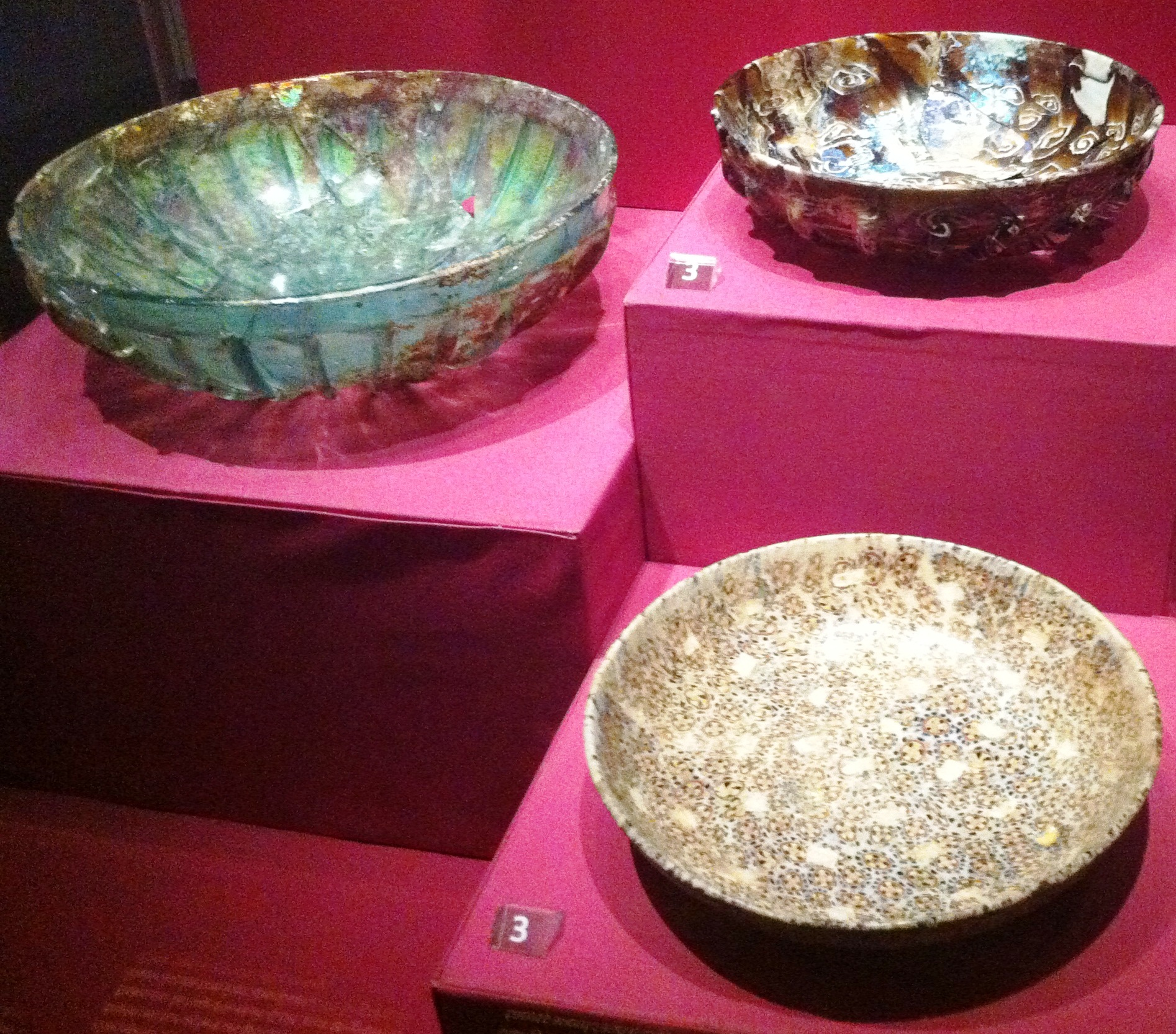
Glass bowls

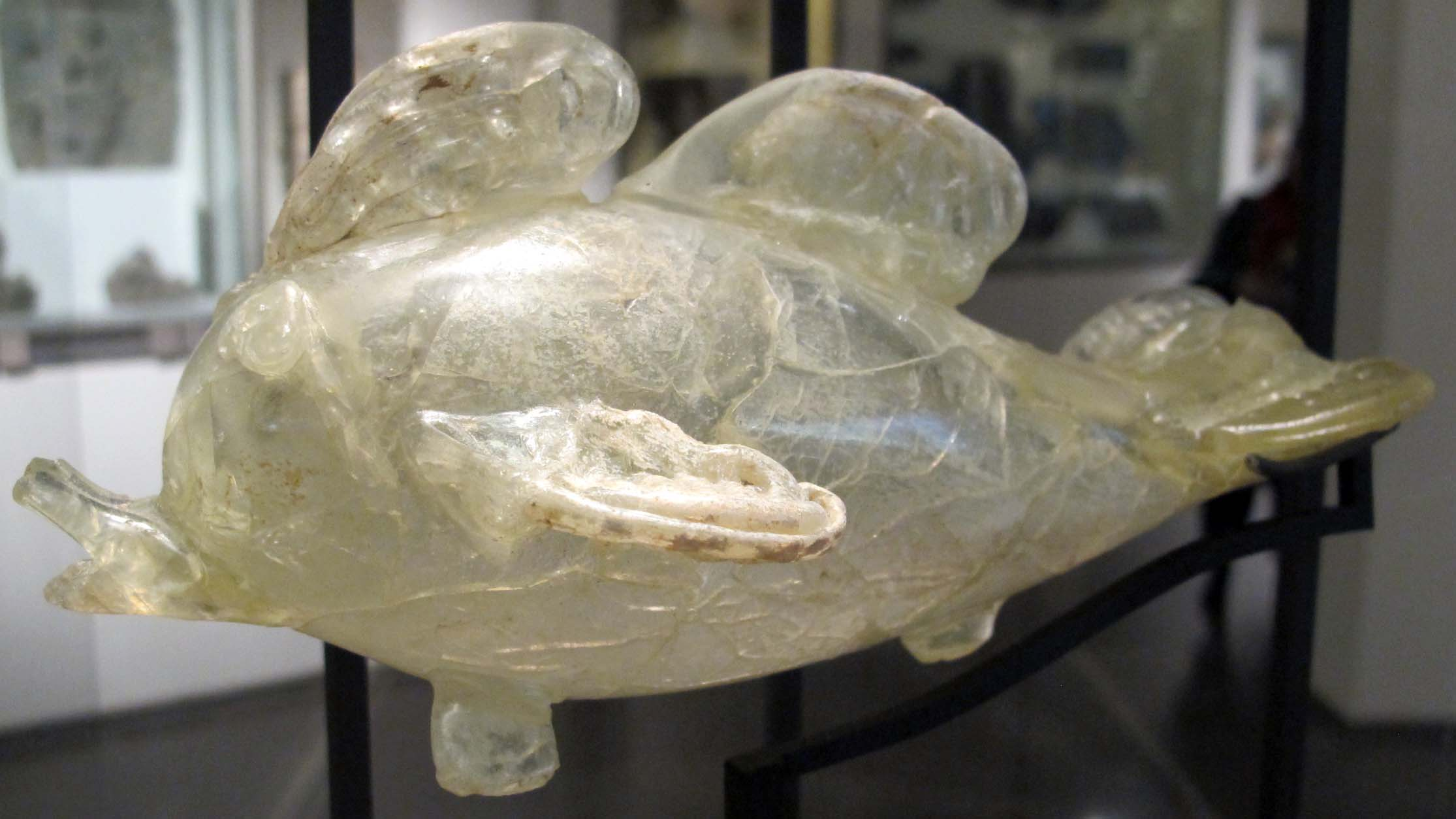
Vial in the shape of a fish.

=== Ivory ===
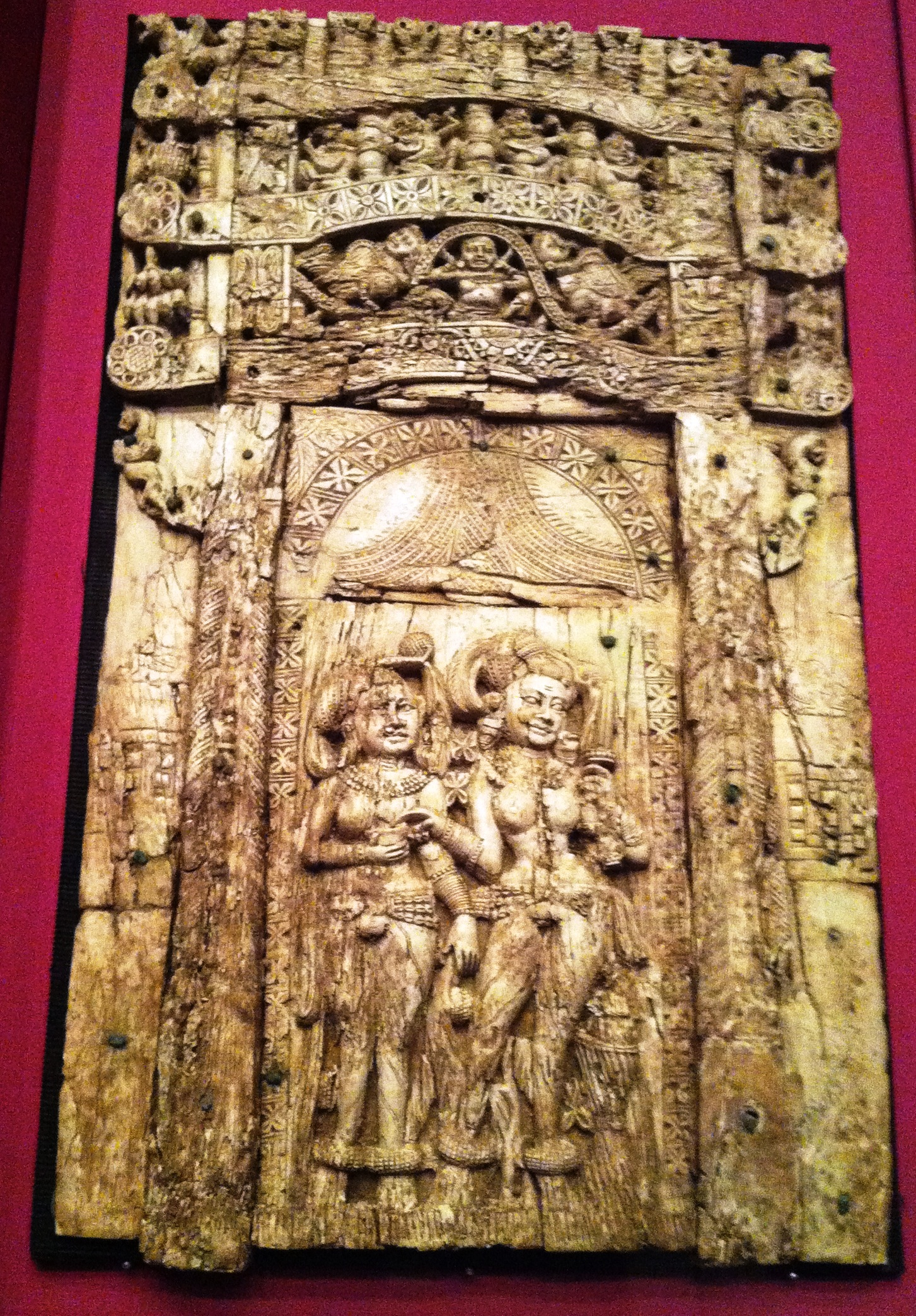
Ivory plaques.

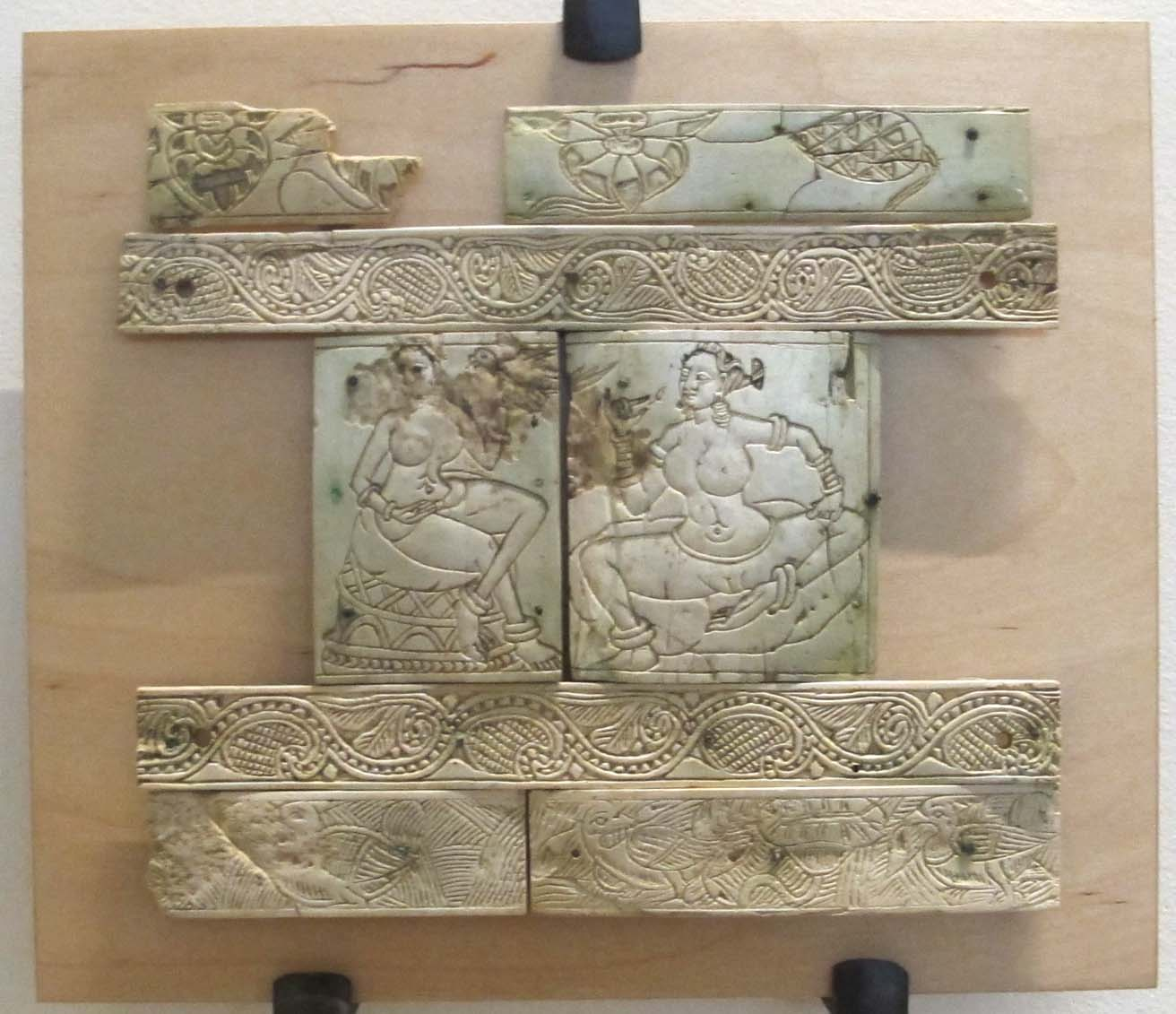
Ivory plaques

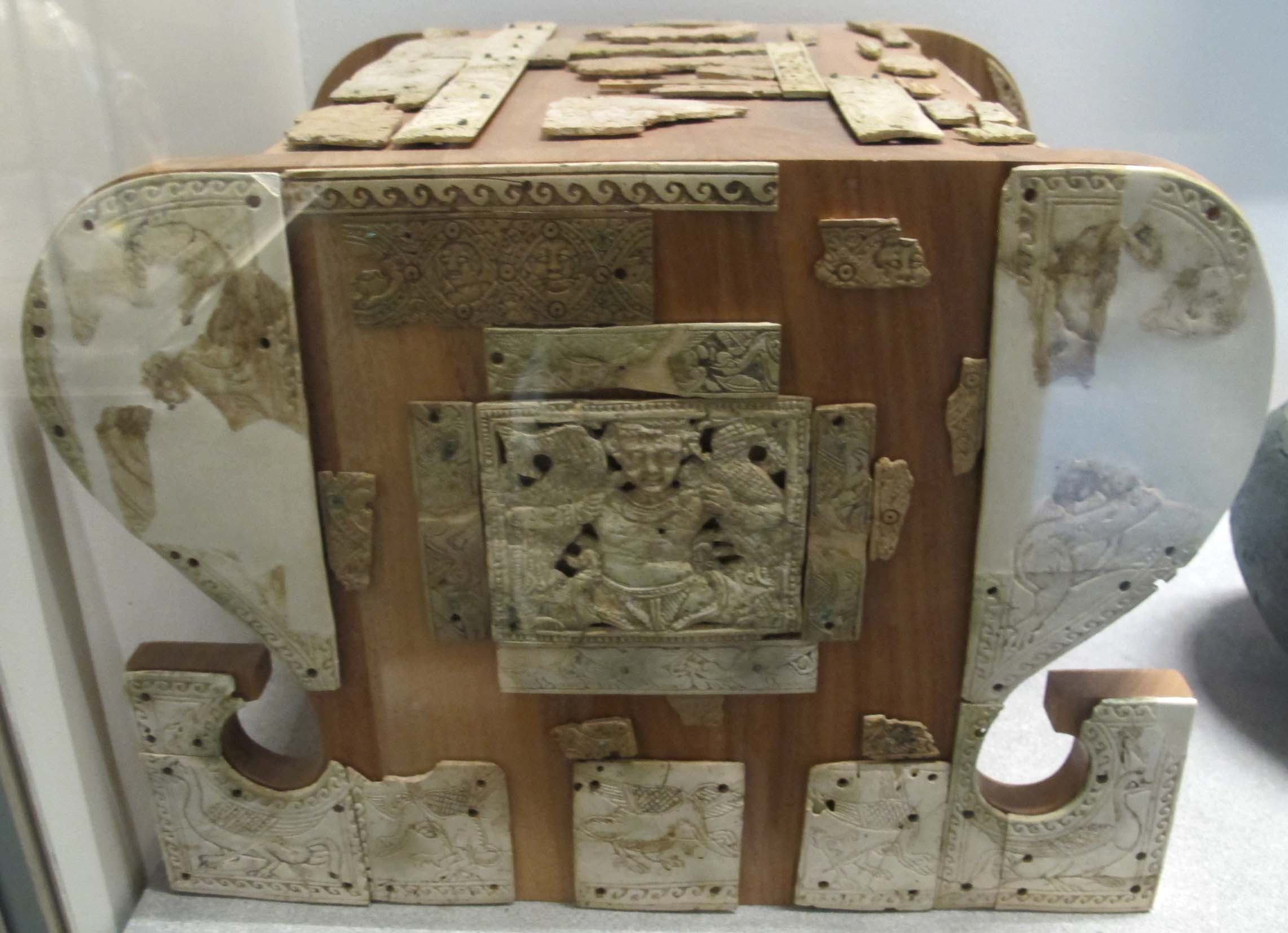
Ivory box with ornaments.

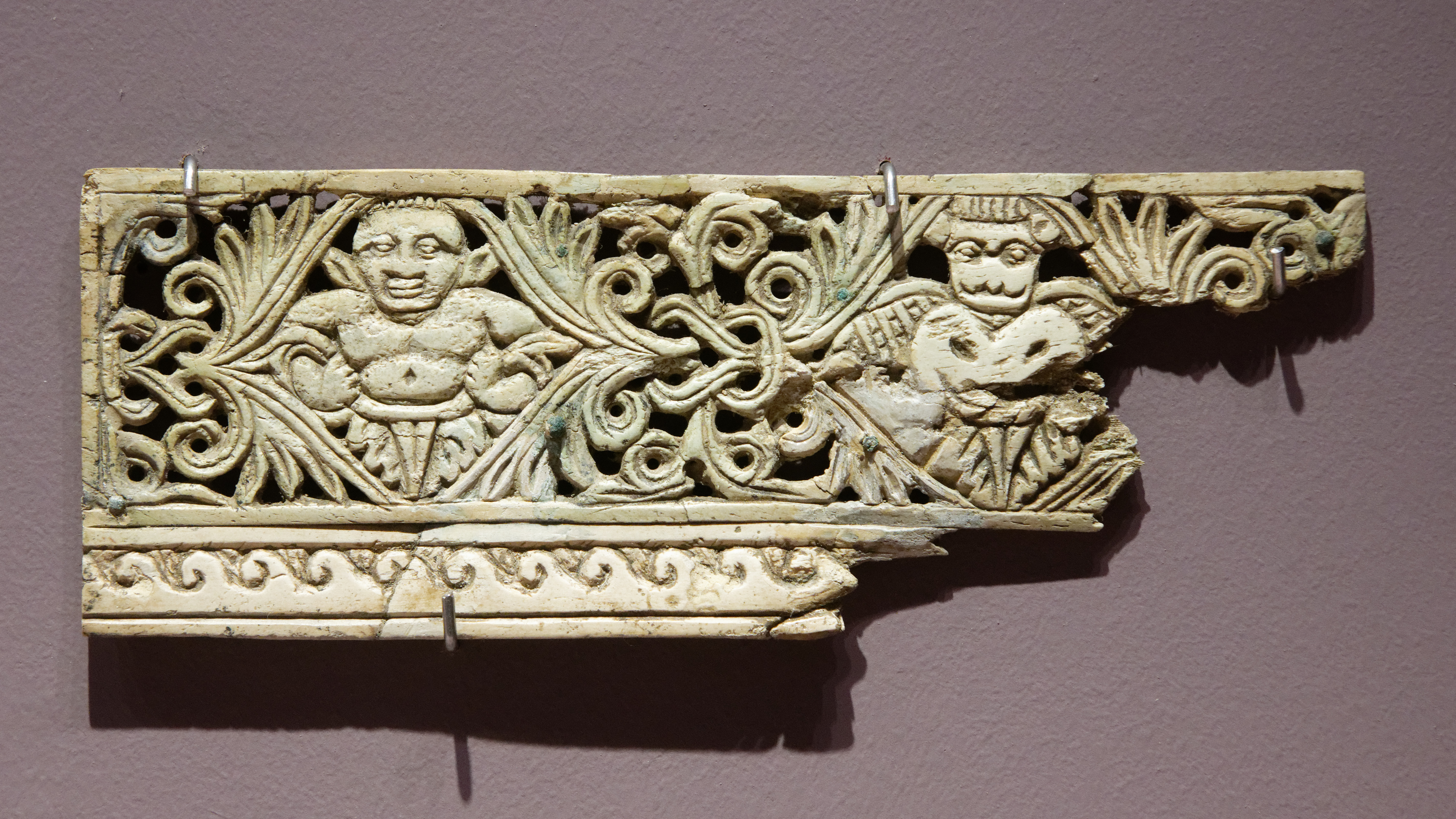
Ivory furniture part, Begram Hoard, Guimet Museum (MA230).

=== Plaster ===
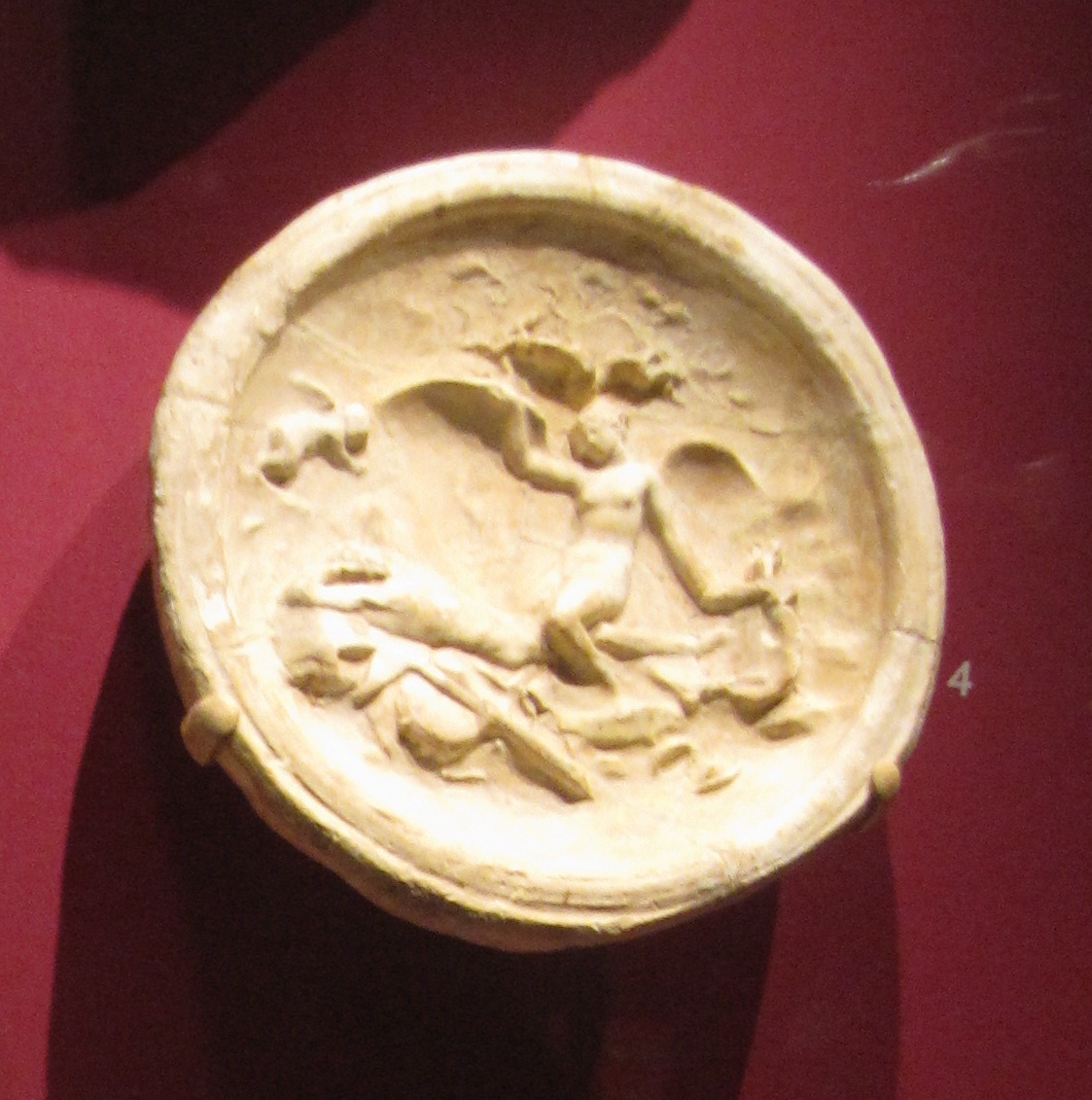
Emblema with Endymion and Selene

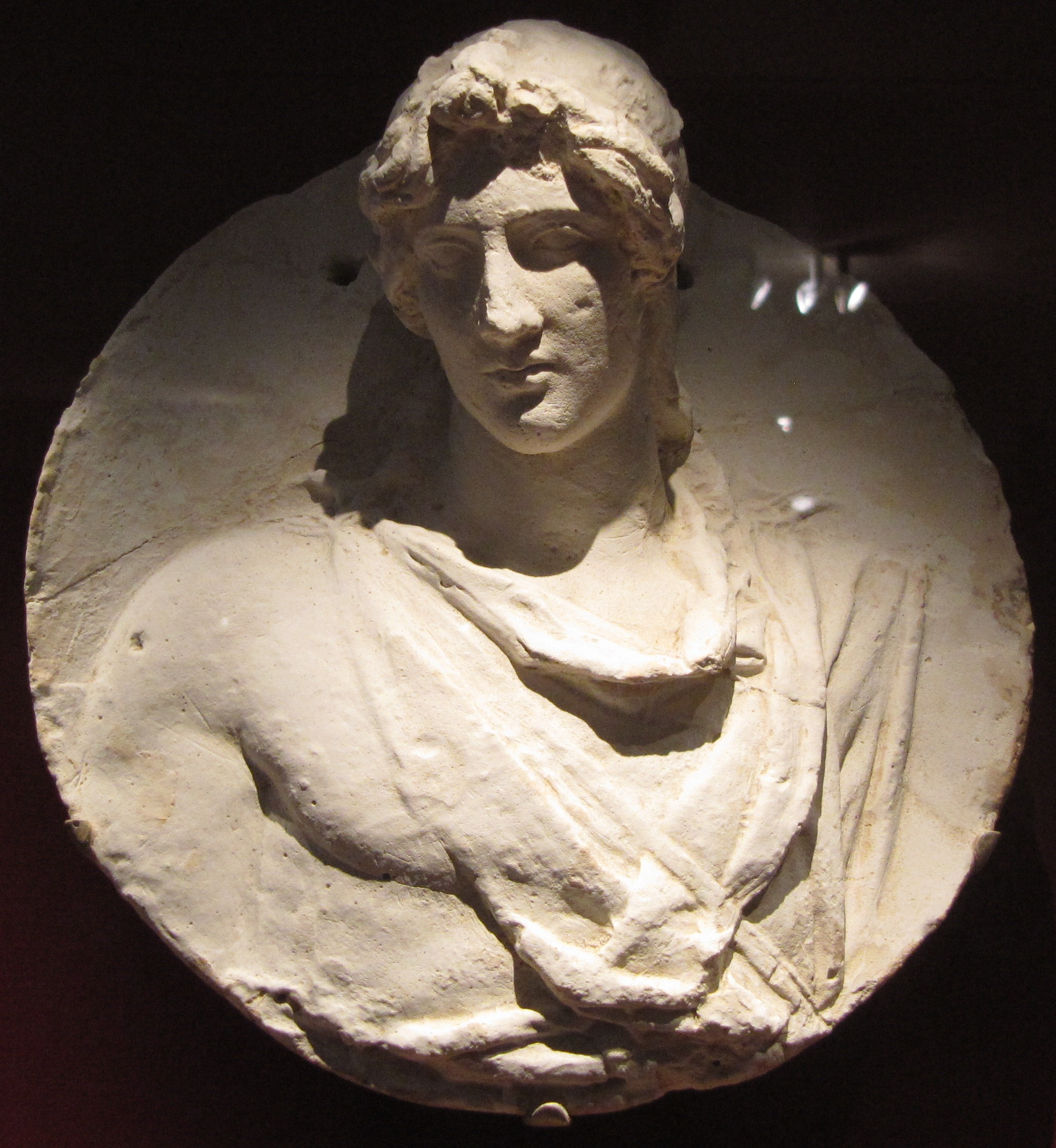
Medallion

=== Other materials ===
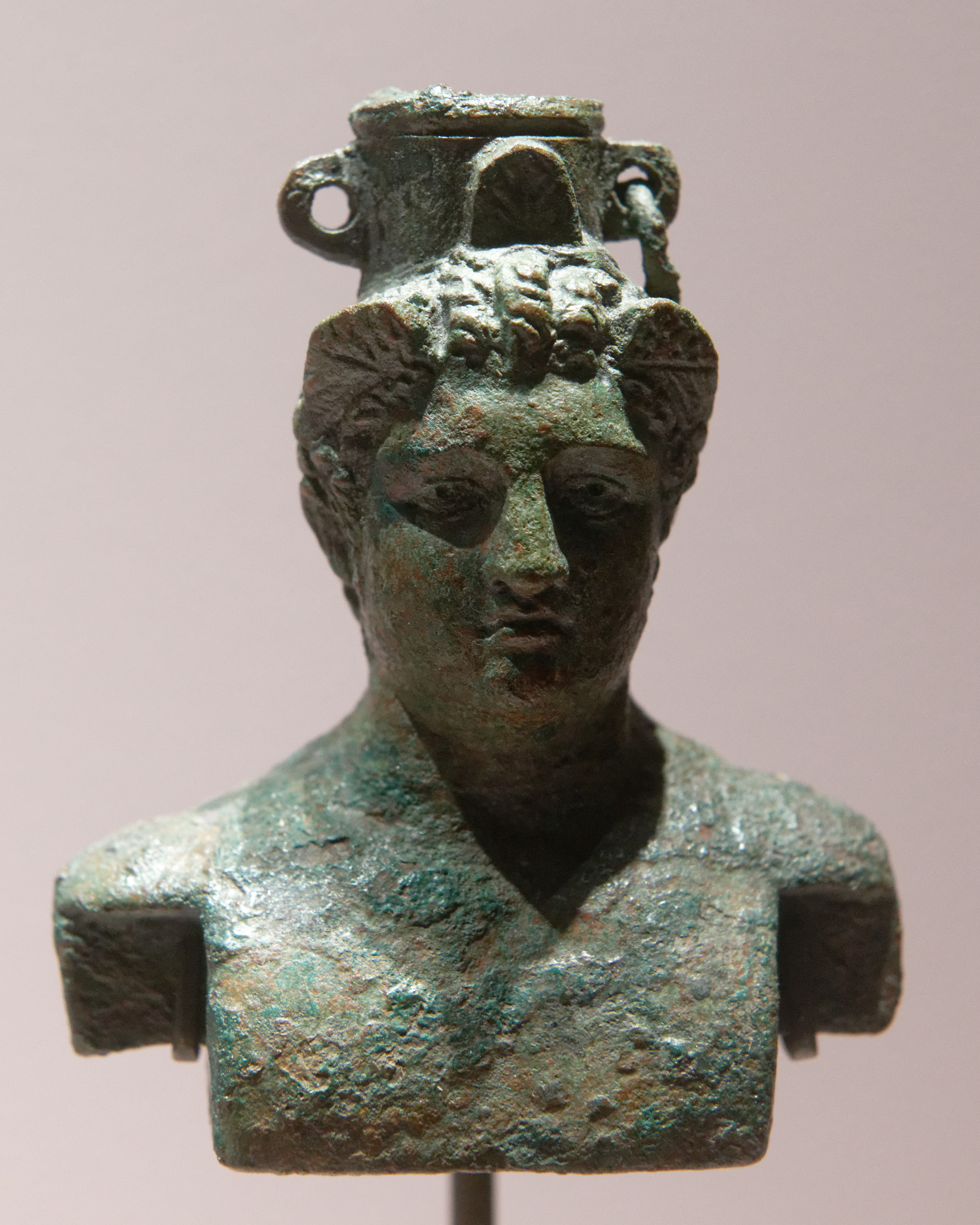
Mercury, Begram Hoard, Guimet MG21230.

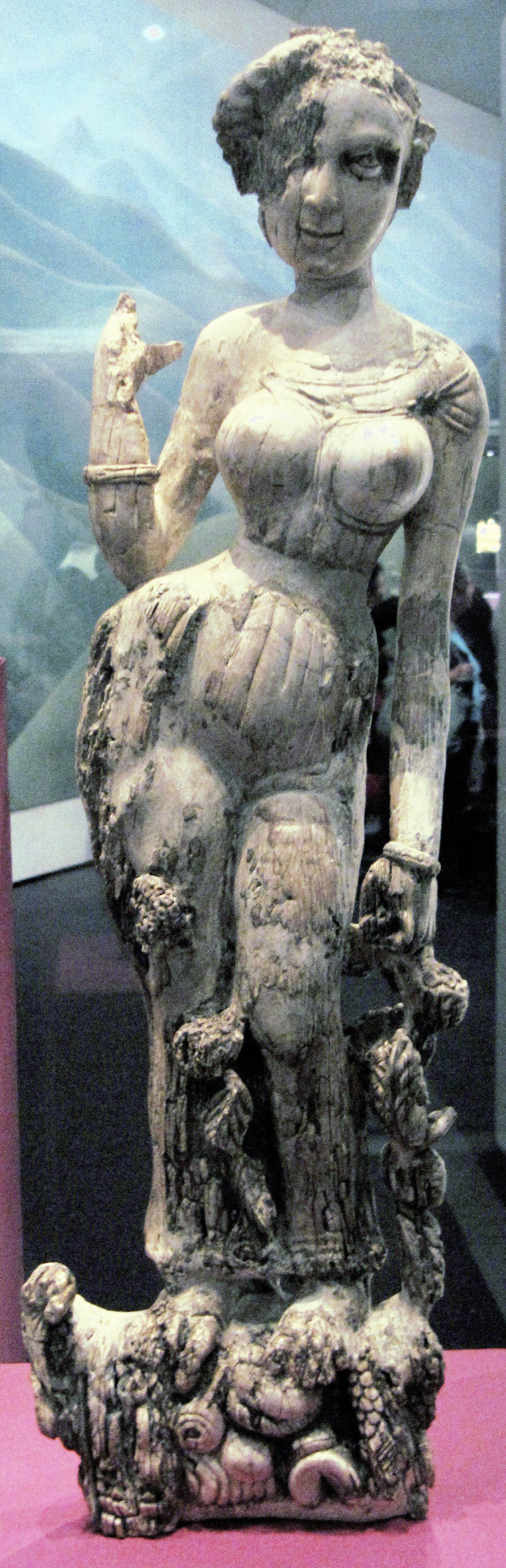
Yakshini on top of a makara.

== See also ==
- Greco-Buddhist Art
- Culture of Afghanistan
