= Surendranath Sen =

Indian historian

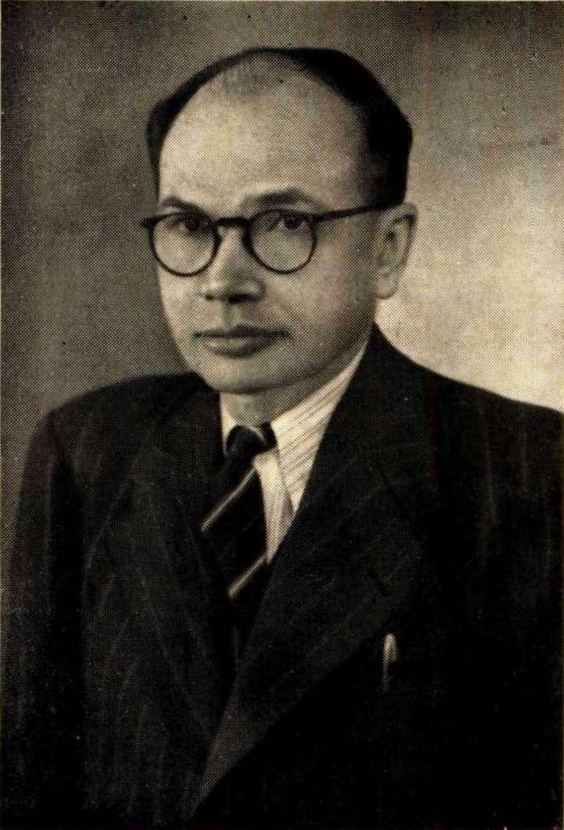
- Born: 29 July 1890; British India
- Died: 30 October 1962 (aged 72); India
- Occupations: Historian, archivist
- Employer: National Archives of India
- Known for: Studies on the Indian Rebellion of 1857
- Notable work: Eighteen Fifty-Seven
- Title: Director, National Archives of India

Surendranath Sen (1890–1962) was an Indian historian best known for his scholarly work on the Indian Rebellion of 1857 and the early phase of British colonial rule in India. He served as Director of the National Archives of India and was a prominent figure in the development of modern, source-based Indian historiography during the mid-20th century.

== Early life and education ==
Surendranath Sen was born on 29 July 1890 in Bengal, British India. He pursued higher education in history and related disciplines, eventually specializing in modern Indian history with a focus on archival research.

== Selected works ==
- Eighteen Fifty-Seven
- Articles and archival reports published through the National Archives of India
- The Military System of The Marathas
