= Begram ivories =

Ancient carvings from Afghanistan

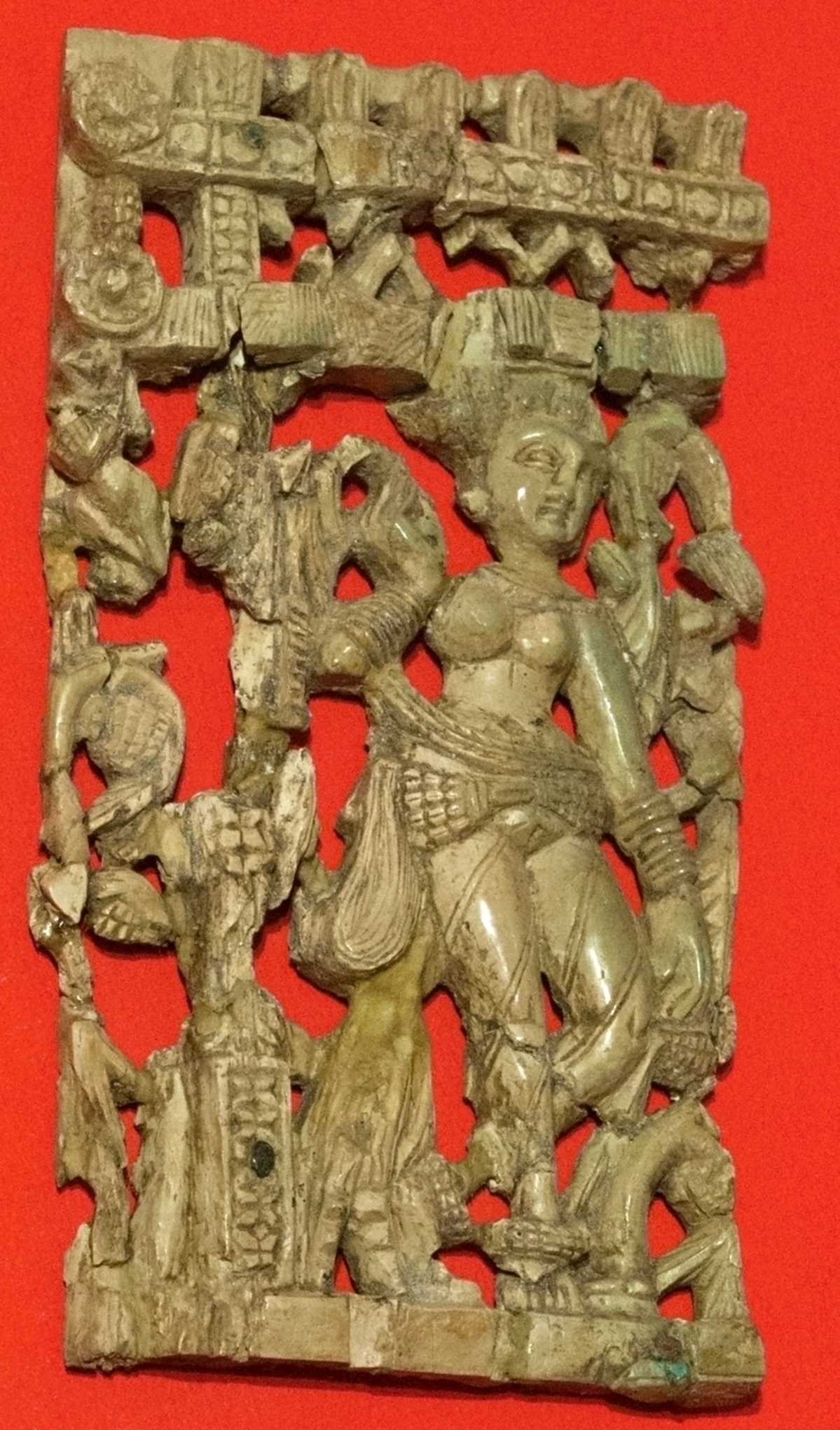
- Fragment of a frieze
- Material: ivory
- Period/culture: 1st or 2nd century CE
- Discovered: 34°58′0″N 69°18′0″ E
- Place: Bagram (Begram), Afghanistan.

Location

The Begram ivories are a group of over a thousand decorative plaques, small figures and inlays, carved from ivory and bone, and formerly attached to wooden furniture, that were excavated in the 1930s in Bagram (Begram), Afghanistan. They are rare and important exemplars of Kushan art of the 1st or 2nd centuries CE, attesting to the cosmopolitan tastes and patronage of local dynasts, the sophistication of contemporary craftsmanship, and to the ancient trade in luxury goods.

They are the best known element of the Begram Hoard. The French Archaeological Delegation in Afghanistan (DAFA) conducted excavations at the site between 1936 and 1940, uncovering two walled-up strongrooms, Room 10 and Room 13. Inside, a large number of bronze, alabaster, glass (remains of 180 pieces), coins, and ivory objects, along with remains of furniture and Chinese lacquer bowls, were unearthed. Some of the furniture was arranged along walls, other pieces stacked or facing each other. In particular, a high percentage of the few survivals of Greco-Roman enamelled glass come from this discovery.

== History ==
The ancient city of Kapisa (near modern Bagram), in Bactria was the summer capital of the Kushan Empire, which stretched from northern Afghanistan to northwest India between the 1st and the 4th centuries. Some eighty miles from Kabul, the strategically located city dominated two passes through the Hindu Kush, connecting Bactria with Gandhara (modern north-east Pakistan.

The finds were divided, in accordance with the system of partage, between the Musée Guimet and the National Museum of Afghanistan in Kabul. After the Kabul Museum closed in 1978 the whereabouts of the ivories was uncertain, and many items were looted in the 1990s.

A number of the missing items were located in 2004, and a further group of twenty pieces, illicitly traded by antiquities dealers, was later recovered and is to be repatriated. After conservation treatment in the British Museum they were exhibited there in 2011. Six ivories are currently housed at the Cleveland Museum of Art.

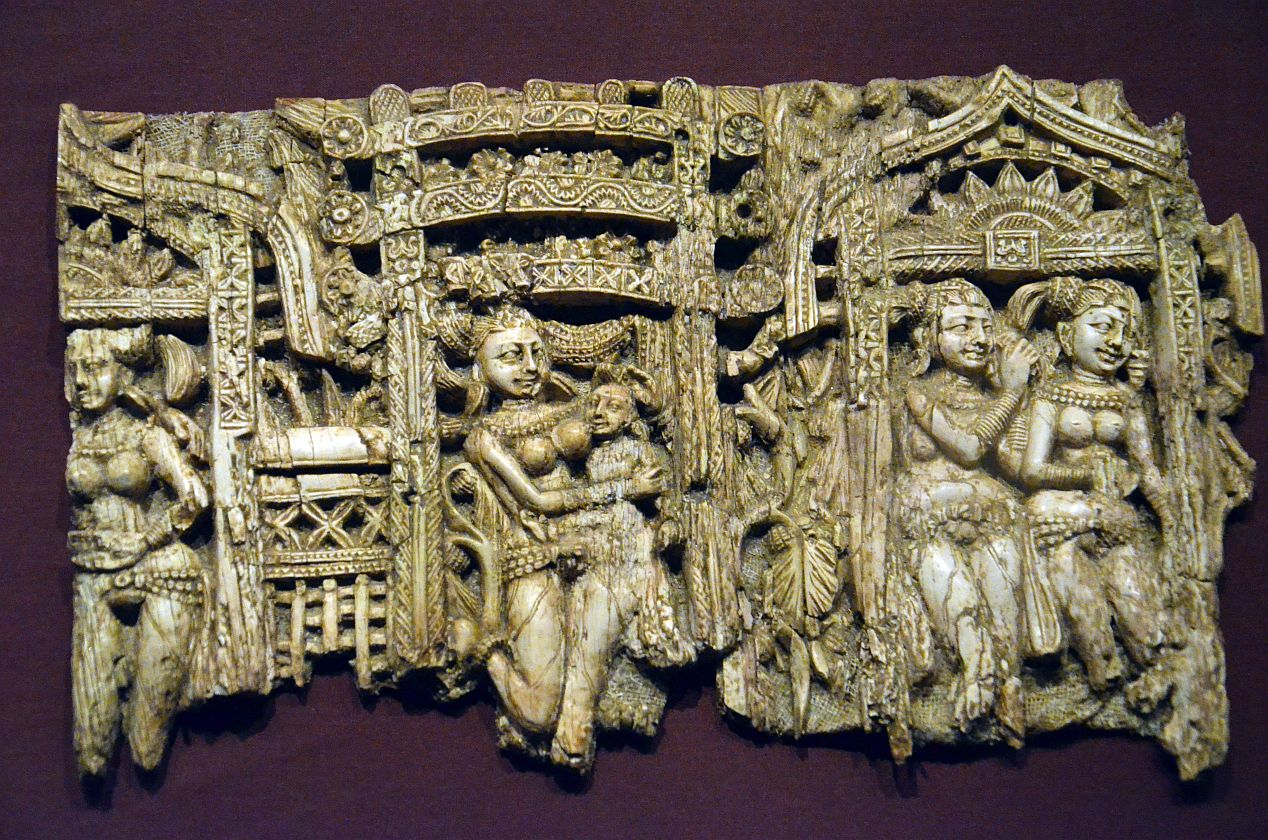
Begram decorative plaque from a chair or throne, ivory, c.100 BCE

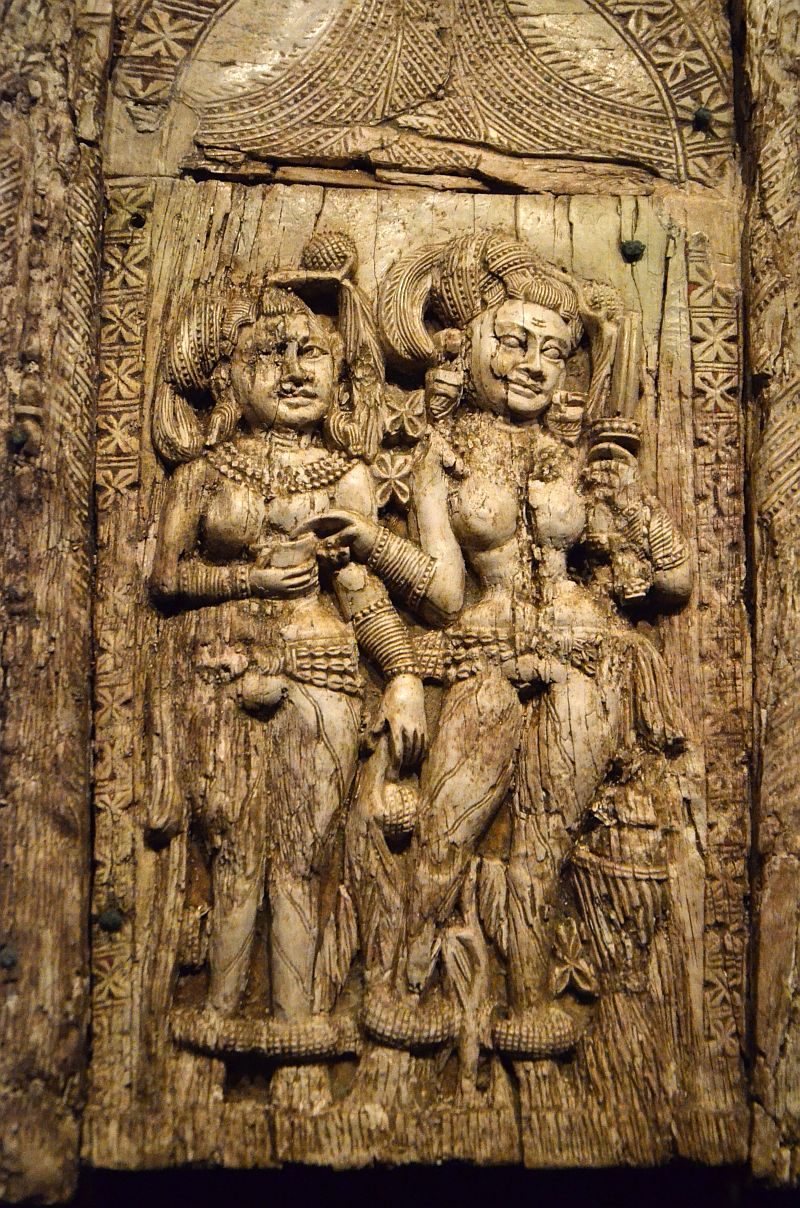
Begram decorative plaque from a chair or throne, c.100 BCE

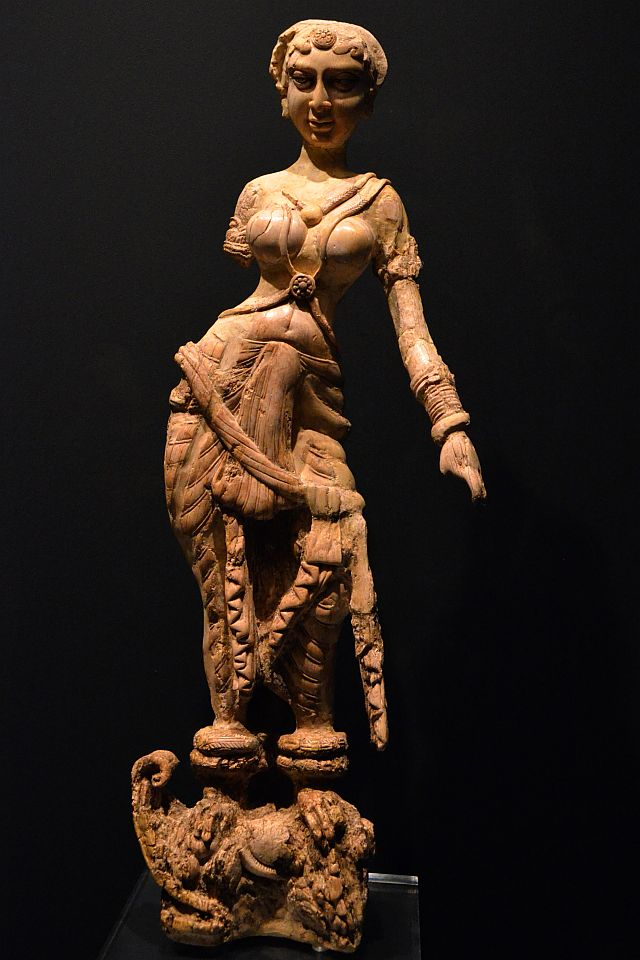
Indian ivory furniture support from Begram, 1st century CE

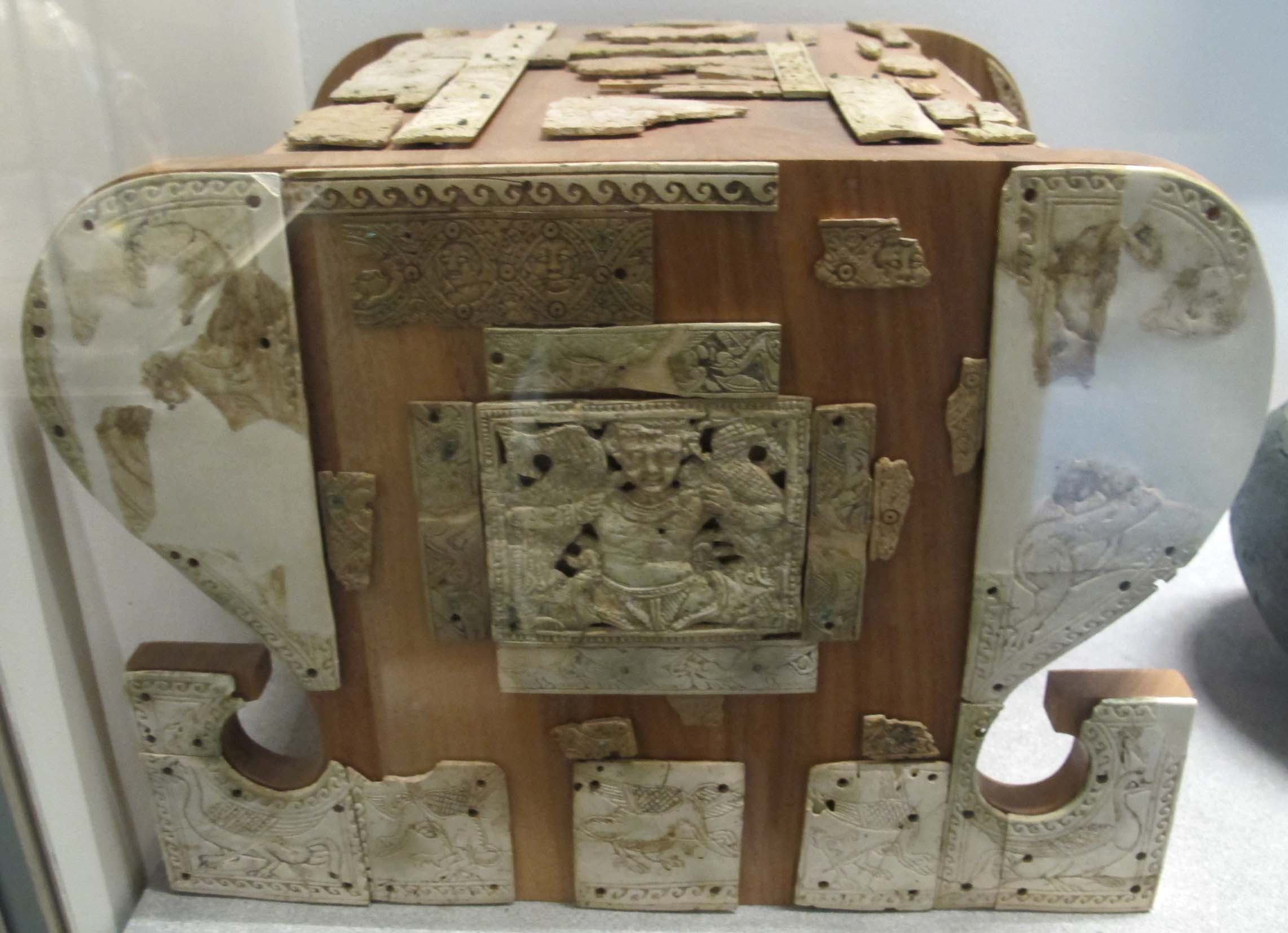
Ivory coffer found in Begram

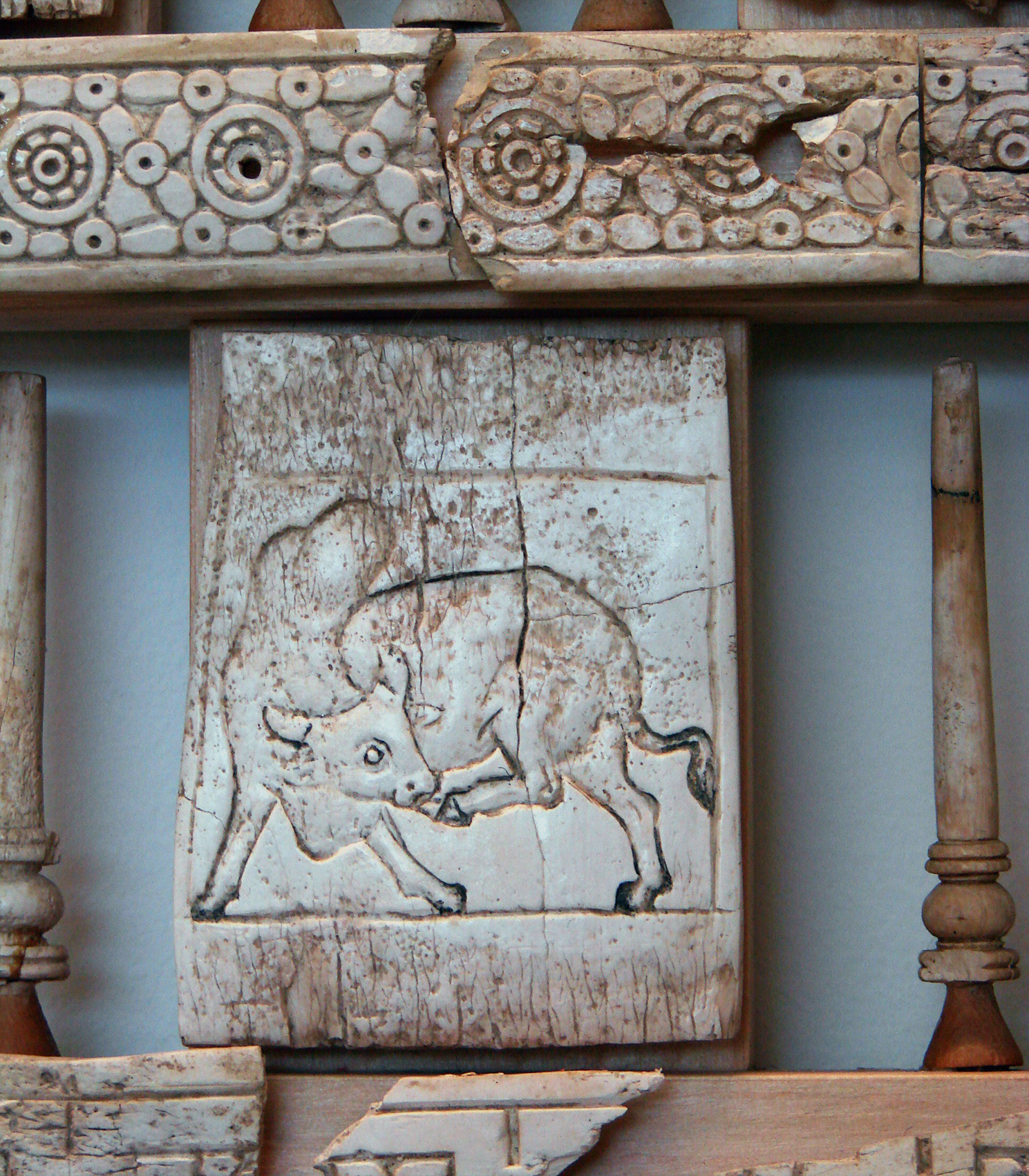
Detail of ivory coffer

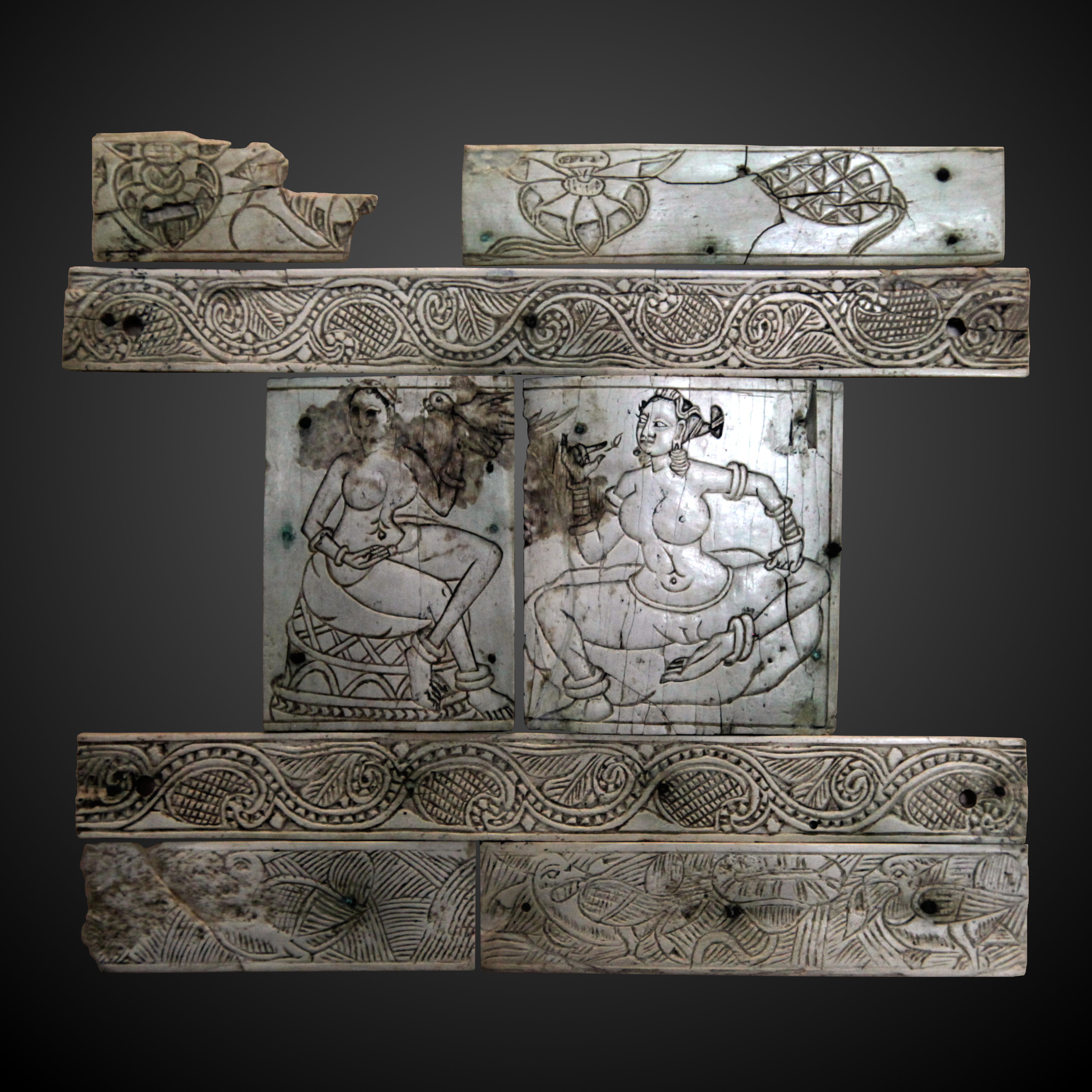
Coffer ornament depicting women playing with a bird

== Technology ==
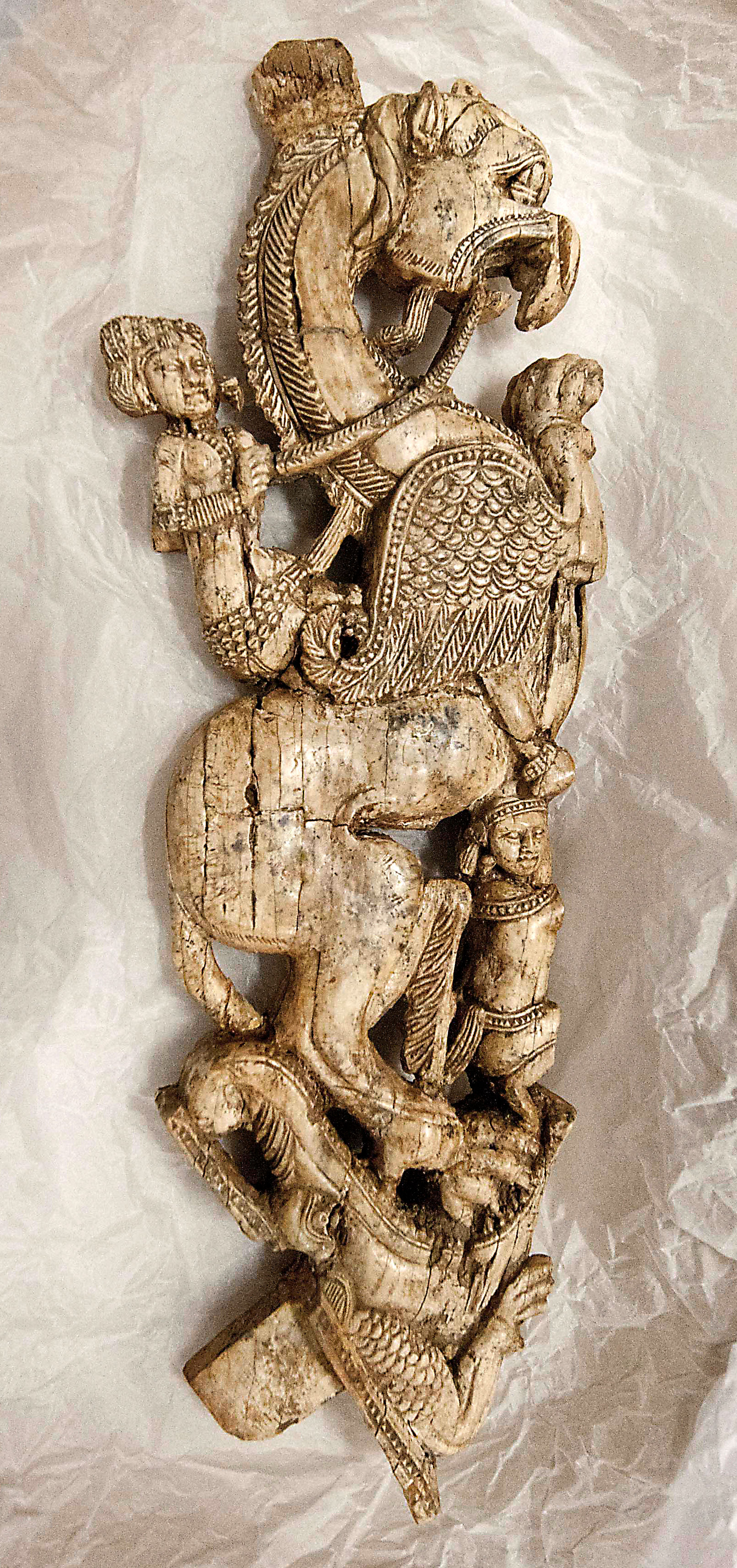
Griffin, ivory, Begram ivories.

Both ivory and bone were carved in relief panels, often with two or three strips forming a single inlay. Only ivory was used for openwork.

After carving the surfaces were smoothed and lightly polished. Traces of colour survive, showing the use of alternating red and blue pigments, and the highlighting of plain backgrounds with red or black. The mineral pigment vermilion and the organic colorant indigo have been identified.

The inlays were attached to what have been identified as chairs and footstools by copper alloy rivets, through pre-drilled holes. The woodwork itself has disintegrated, preventing identification of the species and source of the timber, but metal nails and clamps survive.

== Conservation ==
Organic materials such as ivory and bone are fragile and prone to environmental deterioration. In order to stabilise the ivory fragments and lift them from the ground they were coated in gelatine and faced in tissue. Trapping dirt and deteriorating and shrinking over time, these and subsequent coatings have resulted in damage to the ivory and loss of pigmentation. Cracks and breaks have been filled with a variety of adhesives, without consolidation of the edge, and differing reconstructions led to the accumulation of residues from previous treatments.

Technical analysis by the British Museum provided information on materials and techniques of production, present condition, deterioration phenomena, and previous interventions. Subsequent treatment included the reduction of previous coatings, consolidation, and fills using reversible and compatible materials, with subsequent toning.

== Subject matter ==
The range of motifs include lions, elephants, birds, flowers, female nudes, musicians, dancers, personal ornaments, and architectural backdrops. Some inlays are inscribed with fitters' marks in Kharosthi, Brahmi, and a third unidentified script.

== Dating, attribution, influences and parallels ==
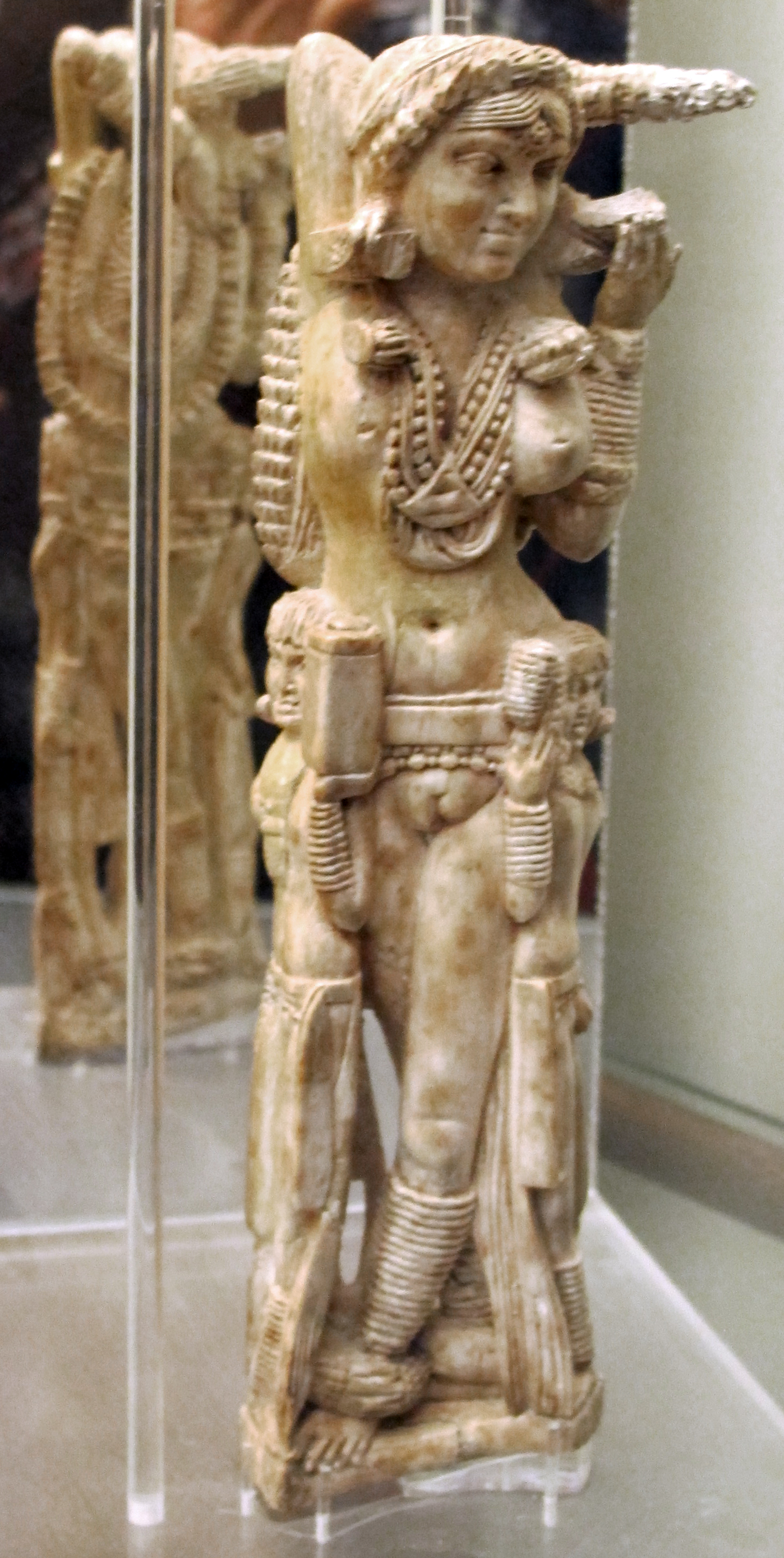
Indian art also found its way into Italy, within the context of Indo-Roman trade: in 1938 the Pompeii Lakshmi was found in the ruins of Pompeii (destroyed in an eruption of Mount Vesuvius in 79 CE).

The rarity of parallels has resulted in disputes as to the origin and date of the ivories, although the stratigraphy would suggest a date no later than the 2nd century. The building itself in which the ivories were found has been dated to the 1st century CE.

The Pompeii Lakshmi, a caryatid found in the Via dell'Abbondanza in Pompeii with a Kharosthi fitter's mark provides further evidence of long-distance trade in Indian furniture decorated with ivory. This could also mean that she might have originated from the northwestern region of India, and manufactured in local workshops around the area of Gandhara.

There is therefore a possibility that these ivories were made locally in the northwest regions on India, and should be dated to the early 1st century CE.

== See also ==
- Ivory carving
- Greco-Buddhist Art
- Nimrud ivories - comparable discoveries from the Neo-Assyrian Empire
- Culture of Afghanistan
