= Grissmann =

Grissmann is a surname. Notable people with the surname include:

- Carla Grissmann (1928–2011), American humanitarian, writer, and educational reformer
- Werner Grissmann (born 1952), Austrian alpine skier

== See also ==
- Grisman
- Grossman
