= National Archives of India =

National archival organization

- Rāṣṭrīya Abhilēkhāgāra
- Emblem of the National Archives of India

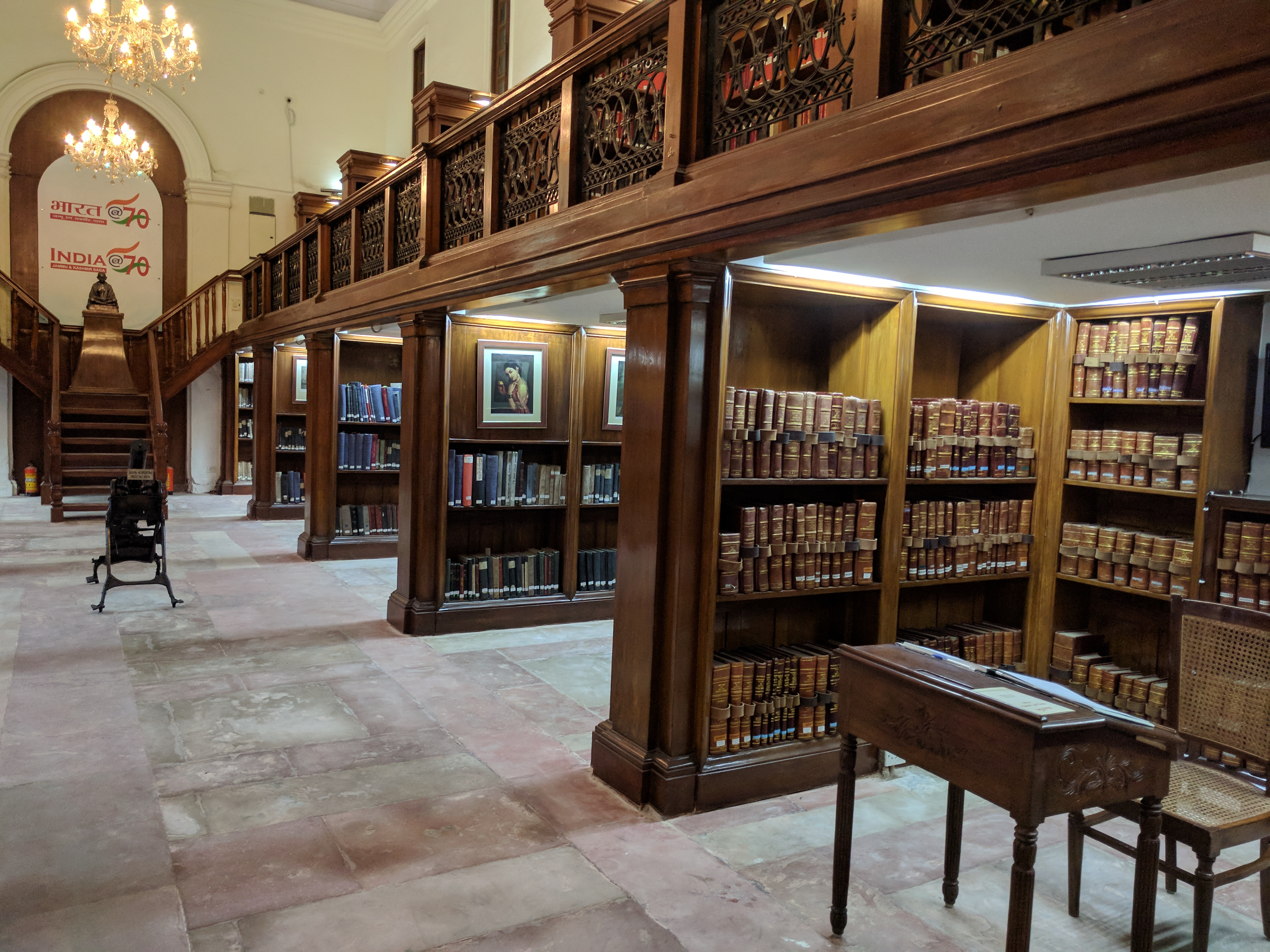
- Interiors of the National Archives of India, New Delhi

Agency overview
- Formed: 11 March 1891; 135 years ago
- Jurisdiction: Government of India
- Headquarters: 28.6157812041274°N 77.21759342513518°E
- Annual budget: ₹376 crore (US$40 million) (2021–2022)
- Minister responsible: G. Kishan Reddy
- Agency executive: Shri Arun Singhal, IAS, Director General of Archives
- Parent department: Ministry of Culture
- Website: nationalarchives.nic.in

The National Archives of India (NAI) is a repository of the non-current records of the Government of India and holds them in trust for the use of administrators and scholars. Originally established as the Imperial Record Department in 1891, in Calcutta, the capital of British India, the NAI is situated at the intersection of the Janpath and Kartavya Path, in Delhi. It functions as an Attached Office of the Department of Culture under the Ministry of Culture, Government of India.

== History ==
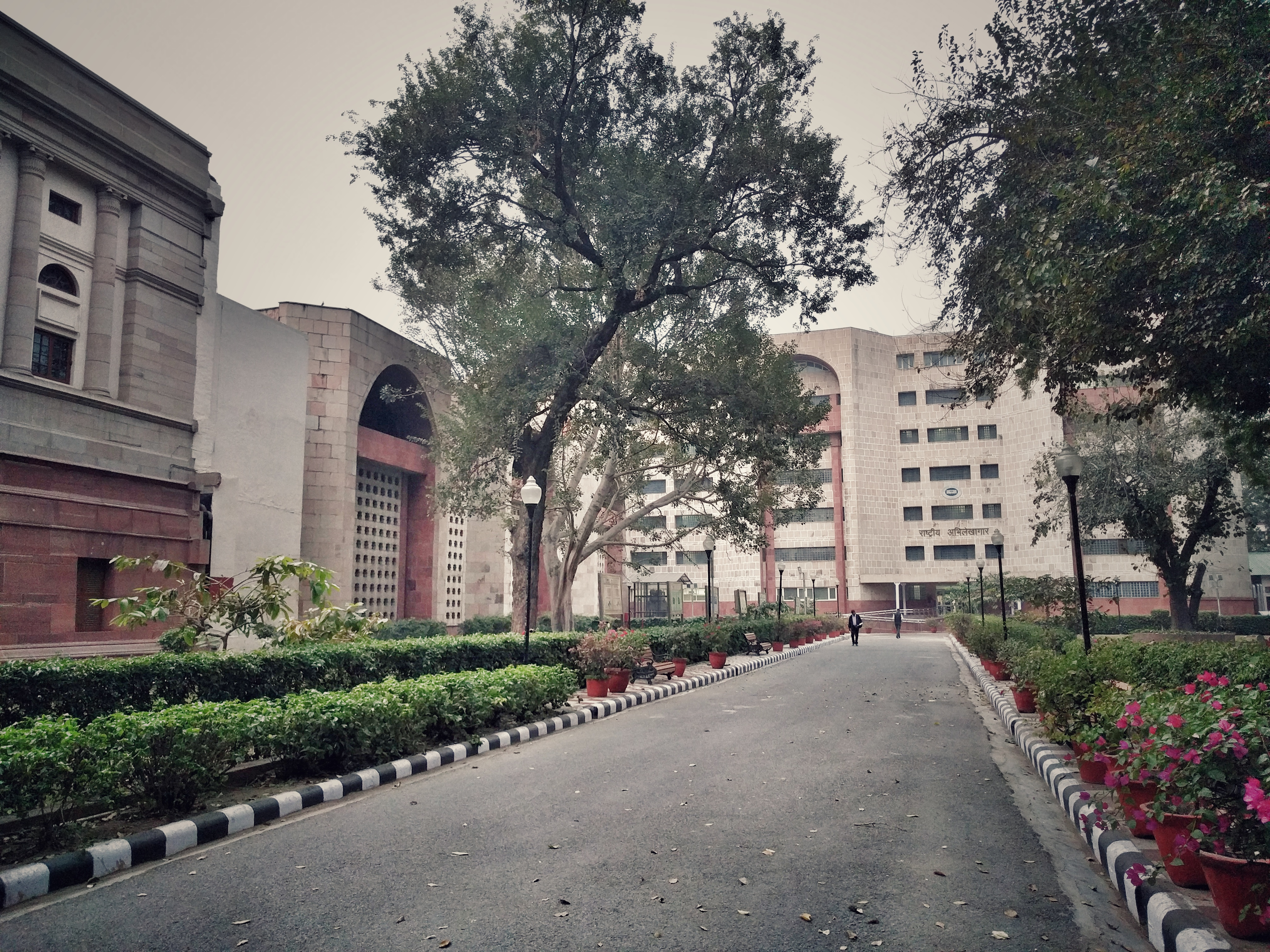
National Archives of India, New Delhi Campus

The Imperial Record Department was set up on 11 March 1891 in Calcutta (Kolkata). G. W. Forrest was named the department head. The Imperial Records Department was charged with aggregating, appraising, and managing the documents of all departments of the British Government. It was led by the Keeper of Records. After independence, the post was renamed Director of Archives.

In 1911 the department was transferred to the new capital, New Delhi, and in 1926 it was shifted into its new building. This building was one of four museum and archive buildings planned by the architect Edwin Lutyens around 'Point B' in the city plan, the intersection of King's Way and Queen's Way. However, only this one was built. It is built in late neo-classical style, and was originally known as the Imperial Record Office.

K. R. Narayanan, then President of India, declared the "Museum of the National Archives" open to the general public on 6 July 1998. This museum provides a representative overview of the multifarious holdings of the National Archives, and promotes a common man's interest in archival holdings.

The NAI has a Regional Office at Bhopal and three Record Centres at Bhubaneswar, Jaipur and Puducherry.

In 2016, The Indian Government issued a 10 INR coin along with a non-circulating and collectible 125 INR coin to commemorate the 125th anniversary of the National Archives.

== Records ==
The holdings in the National Archives are in a regular series starting from the year 1748. The languages of the records include English, Arabic, Hindi, Persian, Sanskrit and Urdu, and their materials include paper, palm leaf, birch bark and parchment. The records are in four categories: Public Records, Oriental Records, Manuscripts and Private Papers.

There has been a significant amount of criticism regarding the lack of care taken for the preservation and handling of records.

== Exhibitions ==
The National Archives of India also holds regular exhibitions such as the display of declassified files on Subhas Chandra Bose in 2016 and the recent exhibition, "The Jammu and Kashmir Saga", commemorating 70 years of Jammu and Kashmir's accession to India which was held from 10 January 2018 to 10 February 2018. Between 1973 and 2015 NAI has held 108 exhibitions on various themes.

== Abhilekh-Patal ==
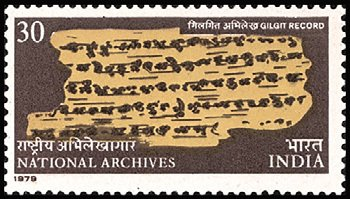
Stamp of India 1979 National Archives of India

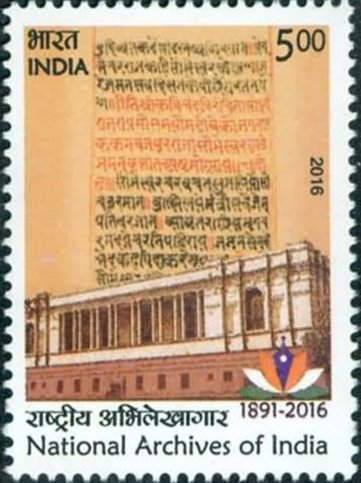
Stamp of India 2016 National Archives of India

Abhilekh-Patal is an online portal to access National Archives of India’s reference media and its digitized collections via the internet. The name 'Abhilekh-Patal' comes from the Sanskrit word 'Abhilekh' meaning the records of ancient times and the word 'Patal' meaning a platform, board or a surface. The word 'PATAL' is also an abbreviation for 'Portal for Access To Archives & Learning'. The portal is a work in progress and is updated with digitized records on a regular basis.

== Gallery ==
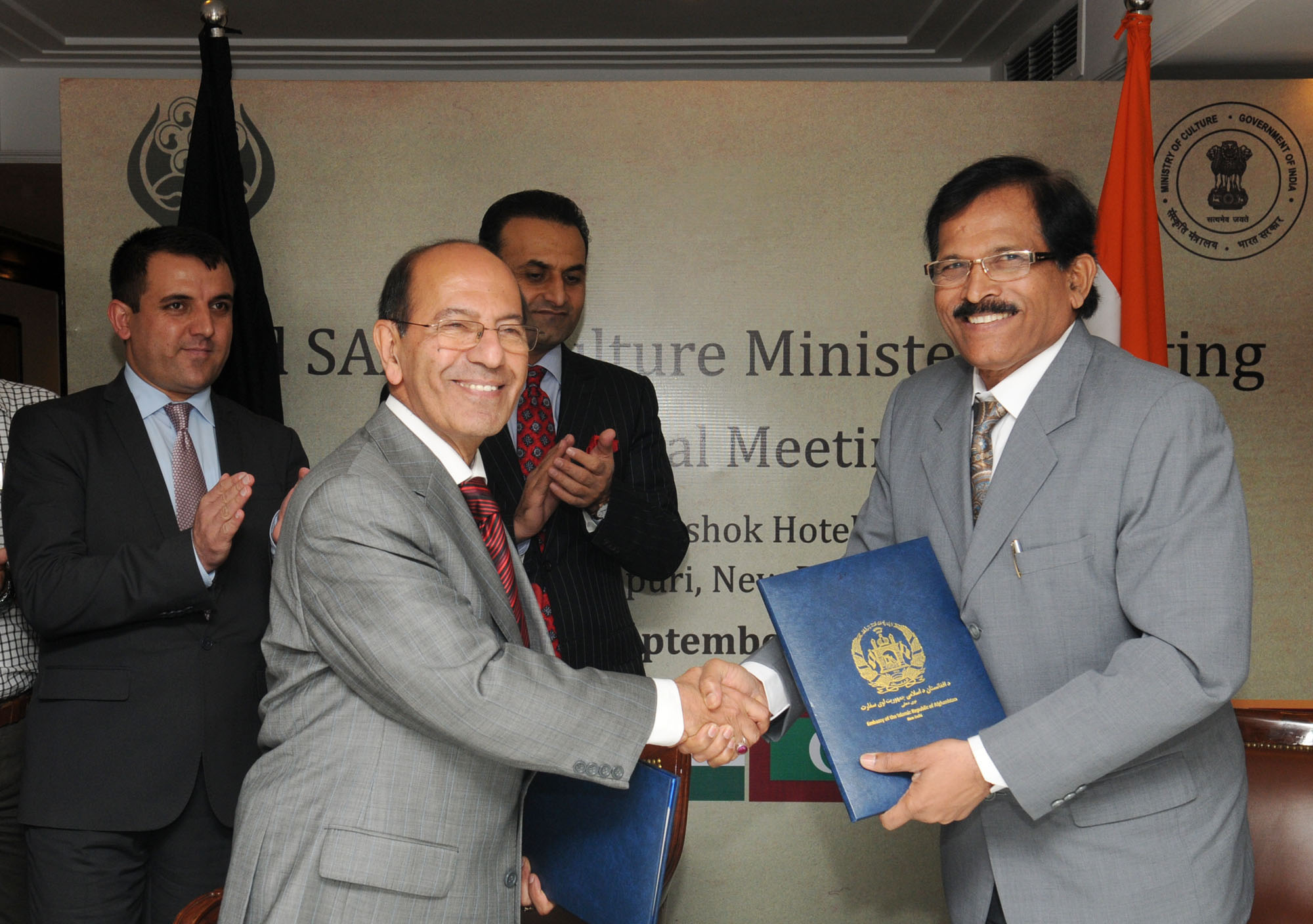
The Culture Ministers of Afghanistan and India signed an MoU between the National Archives of India and the National Archives of Afghanistan

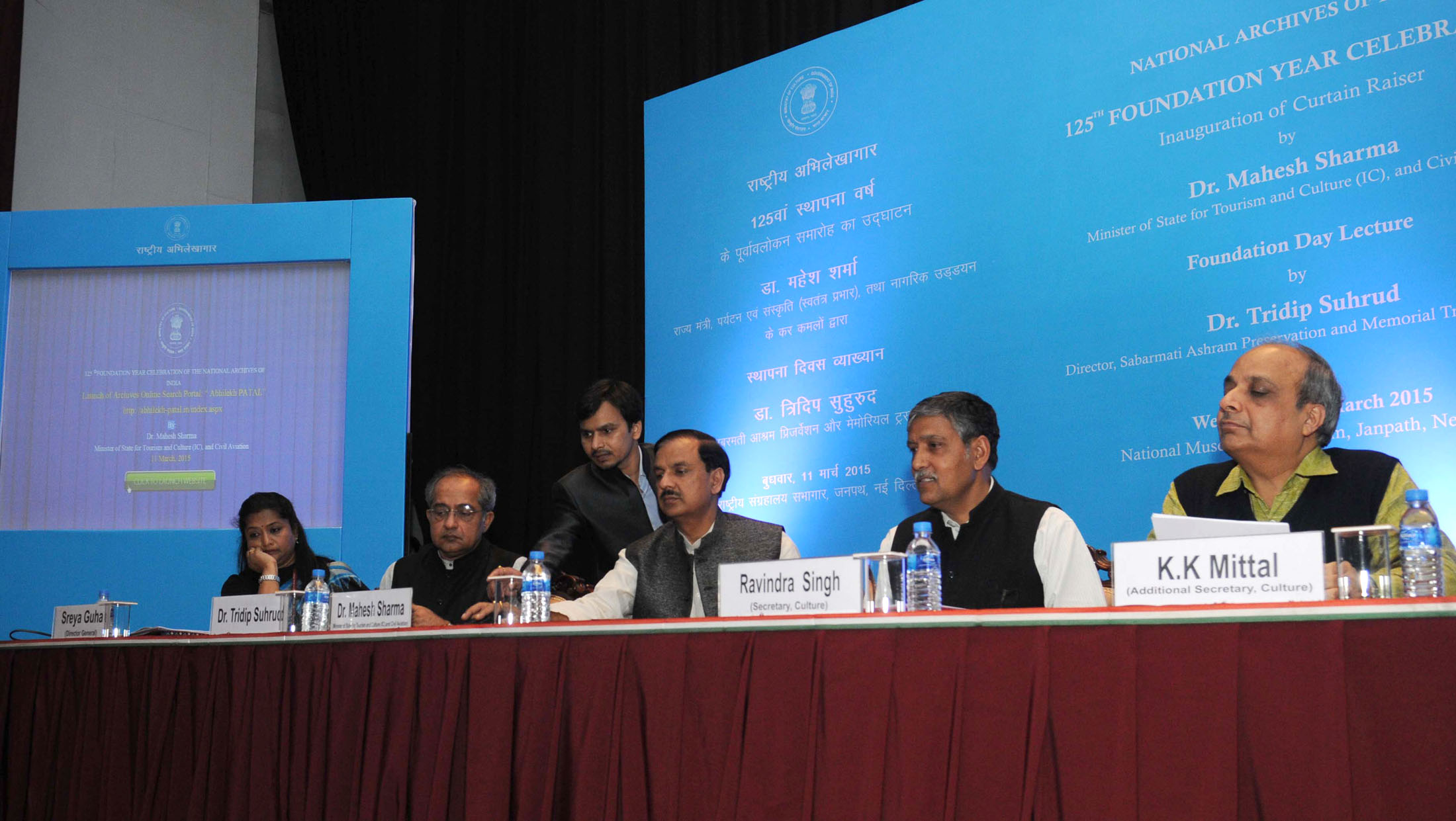
Ceremony of launching the online search portal of records of the National Archives of India ‘Abhilekh-PATAL’, 2015

National Archives of India entrance

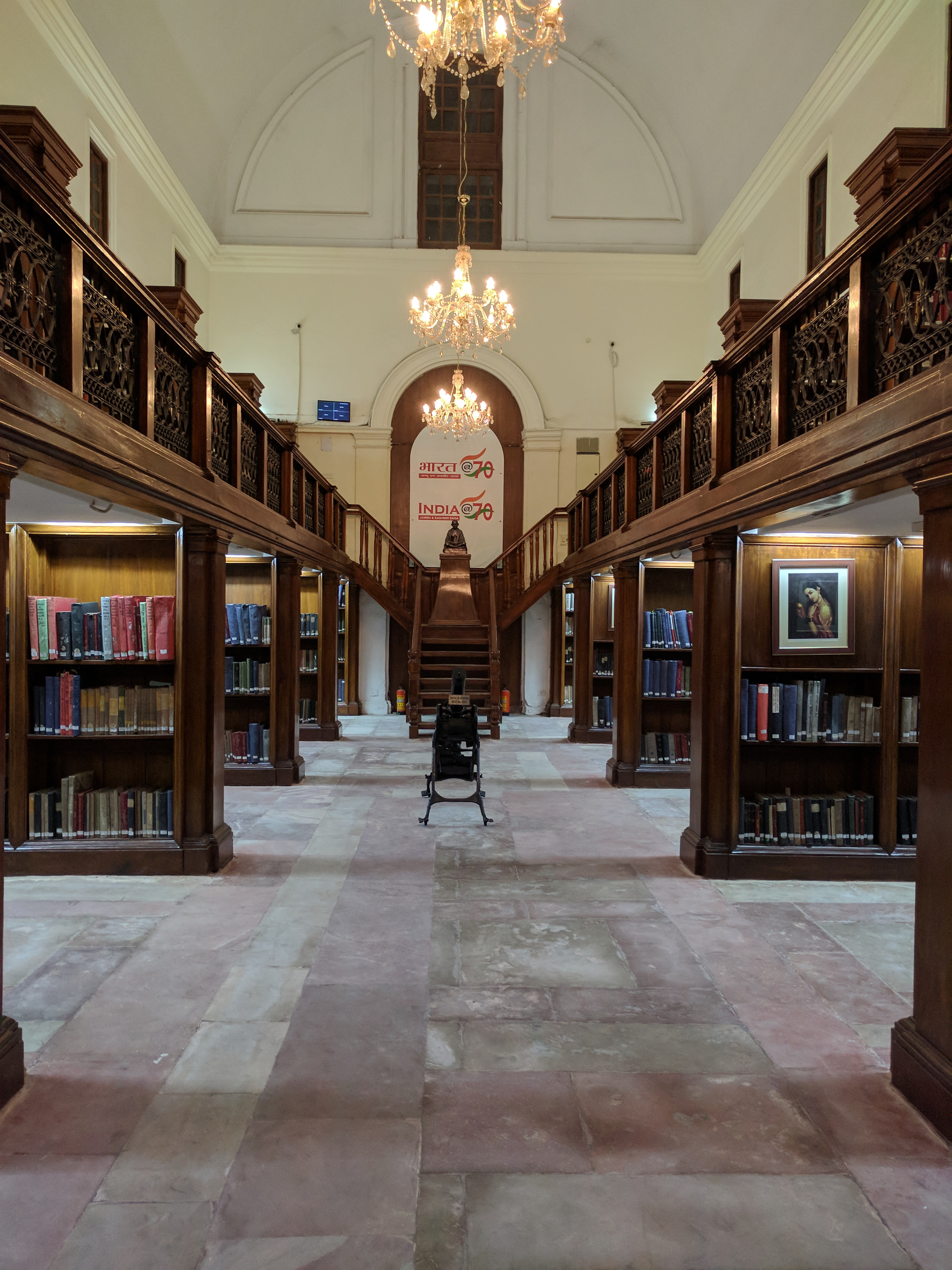
National Archives of India, New Delhi

== See also ==
- Ministry of Culture (India)
- Government of India
