= Grisman =

Grisman is a surname. Notable people with the surname include:

- David Grisman (born 1945), American mandolinist and composer of acoustic music
  - David Grisman Quintet
- Jack Grisman (1914–1944), Royal Air Force officer

== See also ==
- Grissmann
