= National Archives of Afghanistan =

National Archives
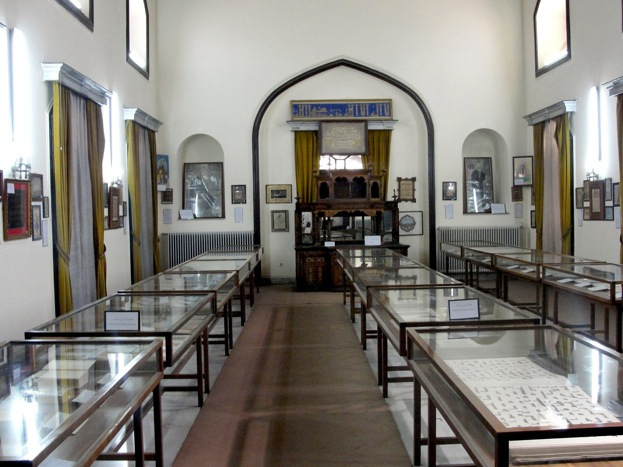
- National Archives of Afghanistan
- Interactive map of National Archives
- 34.52456660875703°N 69.16796929003492°E
- Alternative name: ملي آرشيف
- Location: Kabul, Afghanistan
- Type: National Archives
- Established: 1973
- Website: Edit this at Wikidata

The National Archives of Afghanistan (Dari: آرشیف ملی افغانستان; Pashto: د افغانستان ملي ارشیف) is located in the southern Shahr-e Naw neighborhood of Kabul, Afghanistan, near the Jamhuriat Hospital and Malalai High School. It contains thousands of important items, including antique furniture once used by Abdur Rahman Khan, the Emir of Afghanistan from 1880 to 1901.

== History ==
Items held in the National Archives are kept in a small palace built in 1892 in Kabul by Emir Abdur Rahman Khan. As the archives were established in 1973, renovations began on the building, which had fallen into disrepair. The restoration, which included interior decorations such as painted tin ceiling tiles and woodcarvings, was completed in 1978. However, the wide scope of violence taking place in Afghanistan prevented the archives from fully opening for years. In 1979, the archives were placed under the control of Afghanistan's Ministry of Information and Culture. In 2002, a new building serving as an extension of the National Archives was opened.

Resources in the Archives are not comprehensively cataloged, but many thousands of the documents are inventoried. Due to the numerous transfers of power in Afghanistan, the National Archive's administration fears the loss of certain books or manuscripts.

One of the oldest archival documents was written and sealed by Tamerlane in the 14th century. The most precious books, ancient Korans illuminated with gold letters, date back four to five centuries. One written by Mostafa Heravi is dated 1799 but most manuscript sources of Afghan history do not have a name or date.

Electricity was introduced in the National Archives relatively recently, and a lack of safe conservation has led to various issues. In 2007, some 1,200 books were in imminent danger, due to the failure of the air conditioning system and lack of climate control.

The National Archives has had a contentious relationship with the government. According to the chief of the National Archives of Afghanistan, Masuma Nazari, “There are thousands of historical documents that yet to be provided to National Archives for better protection according to the law. As many as 5,000 documents are available with the presidential palace but not provided to the archive despite several request calls”. Hundreds of documents considered important are in the hands of citizens, and the Archives do not have the money to buy them back.

== Collection ==
The national archives currently has on display around 9,000 historical items, including 70 historical Korans.

The archive hosts resources including valuable manuscripts, "photos, documents, journals, postage stamps, decrees, family trees, audio and video cassettes".

Reports of the number of items in the archive vary, but generally range from 130,000-180,000 total documents, and 7,700-9,000 manuscripts.

To access the archives, a visitor must gain permission by filling out a form that determines the researcher's needs and presenting a letter from the institution or organization they are a part of. Other visitors are greeted in the exhibition area which displays photocopies of important documents, with some signs written in English.

== See also ==
- List of national archives
- National Museum of Afghanistan
