= Carla Grissmann =

- Born: September 2, 1928; Chicago, US
- Died: February 15, 2011 (aged 82); London, England
- Occupation: Humanitarian

Carla Grissmann (September 2, 1928 – February 15, 2011) was an American humanitarian, who worked as a writer, an educational reformer in Sri Lanka, and a keeper of antiquaries in Afghanistan. She is best known for her memoir Dinner of Herbs.

She grew up in Geneva, Berlin and Bronxville, New York, then worked as an assistant editor on the magazine Réalités in Paris. Next she taught in Tangier, where she became friends with John Hopkins and Paul and Jane Bowles; then she became a researcher in Tunis, and afterwards a journalist for The Jerusalem Post in Israel. She spent a year in a Turkish village, which was the material for her memoir Dinner of Herbs (2001; new edition by Eland 2016).

In 1969, she moved to Kabul, Afghanistan, and started working for the city zoo – ostensibly as an accountant, but her responsibilities included caring for Bobby the Chimp. She would live on and off in Afghanistan for the next thirty years, working for the National Museum. In this capacity, she did important work archiving the museum's collection. Later, she had a crucial role in preserving various museum treasures from the ravages of the war with the Soviet Union and then the Taliban authorities, in the face of often considerable danger. In particular, the survival of remarkable Bactrian gold artefacts can be attributed to the dedication of Grissmann and her colleagues. She has been described as a "defender of the Kabul Museum", with its very survival attributed to her efforts.

Grissmann also worked for the Asia Foundation, establishing English language centres in the science faculties of universities in Sri Lanka and Pakistan; she helped Afghan refugees in Pakistan and set up an unsuccessful hotel in Ladakh. Her articles featured in publications such as the Encyclopædia Iranica and Museum International.
