= National Museum of Afghanistan =

Museum in Kabul, Afghanistan

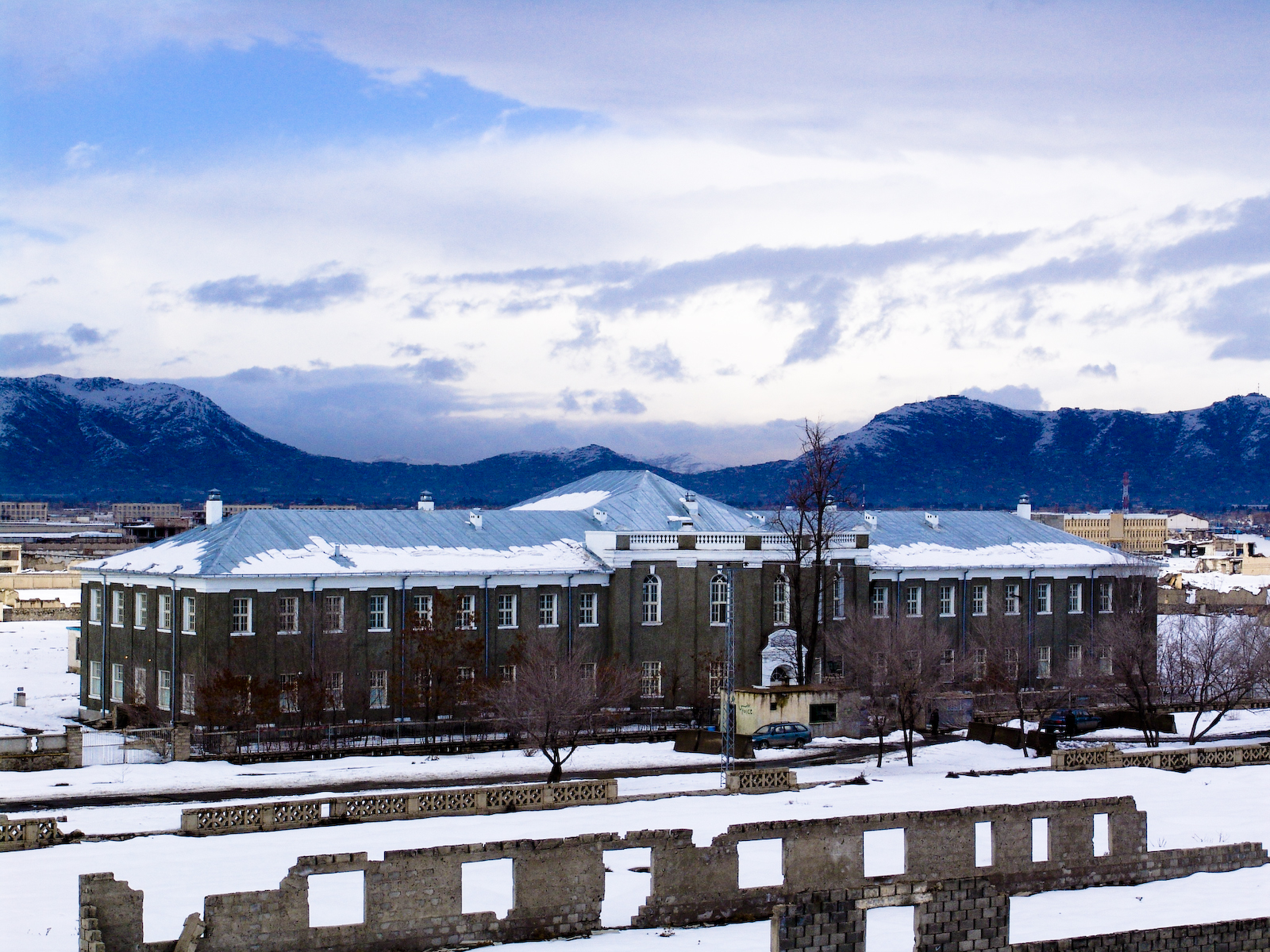
- The National Museum of Afghanistan in 2005
- Established: 1922
- Location: District 6, Kabul, Afghanistan
- Coordinates: 34°28′03″N 69°07′12″E
- Collection size: Over 100,000 as of 1978; now about 50,000-80,000
- Director: Mohammad Zubair Abedi
- Website: www.nationalmuseum.af

The National Museum of Afghanistan (Dari: موزیم ملی افغانستان, Mūzīyam-e Millī-ye Afghānistān; Pashto: د افغانستان ملی موزیم, Də Afghānistān Millī Mūzīyəm) is located across the small street from the Darul Aman Palace in the Darulaman area of Kabul, Afghanistan. It was once considered to be one of the world's finest museums. There have been reports about expanding the museum or building a new larger one. Mohammad Zubair Abedi serves as the current director of the museum.

The museum's collection had earlier been one of the most important in Central Asia, with over 100,000 items dating back several millennia, including items from Persian, Buddhist, and Islamic dynasties.

With the start of the civil war in 1992, the museum was looted numerous times and destroyed by rockets, resulting in a loss of 70% of the 100,000 objects on display.

Since 2007, a number of international organizations have helped to recover over 8,000 artifacts, the most recent being a limestone sculpture from Germany.

Approximately 843 artifacts were returned by the United Kingdom in 2012, including the famous 1st Century Begram ivories.

== History ==
The Afghan National Museum was opened in 1919 during the reign of King Amanullah Khan.

The collection was originally inside the Bagh-e Bala Palace, but was moved in 1922 and began as a 'Cabinet of Curiosities'. It was moved to its present location in 1931. Historian Nancy Dupree co-authored A Guide to the Kabul Museum in 1964. In 1973, a Danish architect was hired to design a new building for the museum, but the plans were never carried out. In 1989, the Bactrian Gold had been moved to an underground vault at the Central Bank of Afghanistan.

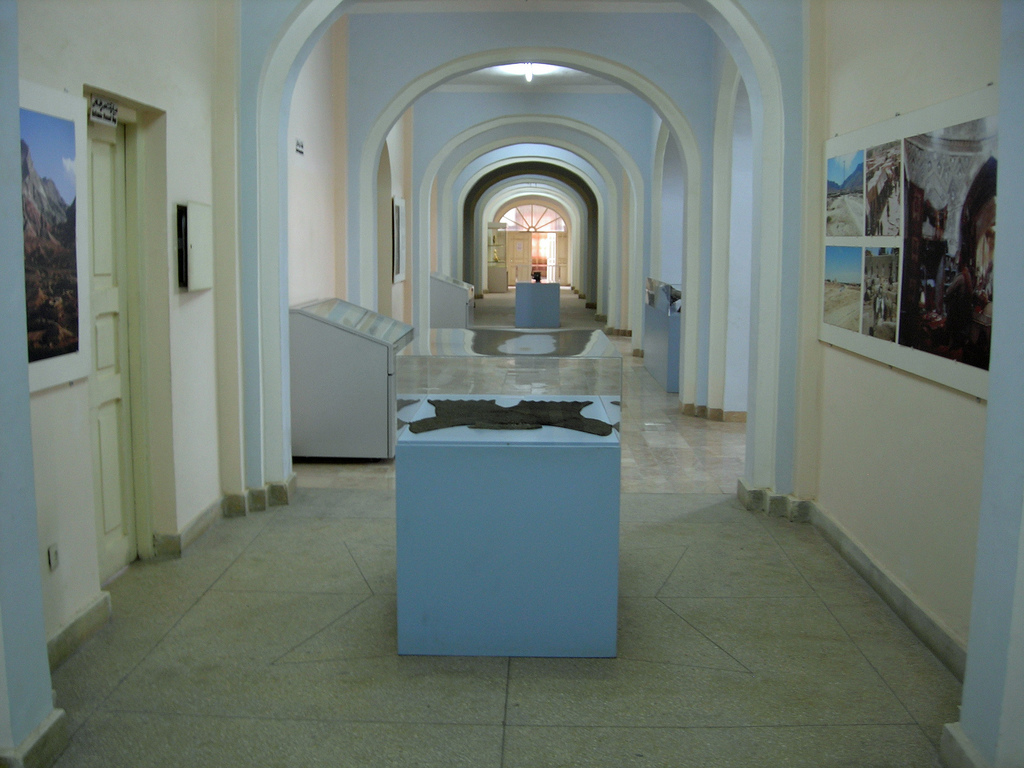
Inside the museum in 2008

After the collapse of President Mohammad Najibullah's government and the start of a civil war in the early 1990s, the museum was looted numerous times, resulting in the loss of 70% of the 100,000 objects which were then on display. A rocket attack in May 1993 buried ancient potteries under debris.

In March 1994, the museum, which had been used as a military base, was struck by rocket fire and largely destroyed. The Ministry of Information and Culture during President Burhanuddin Rabbani's government ordered that the 71 museum staff begin moving the inventory to Kabul Hotel (now Kabul Serena Hotel) in order to rescue them from further rocketing and shelling.

In September 1996, staff at the museum completed the cataloging of the remaining materials. In February and March 2001, the Taliban destroyed countless pieces of art due to religious reasons. It was reported in November 2001 that the Taliban had destroyed at least 2,750 ancient works of art during the year.

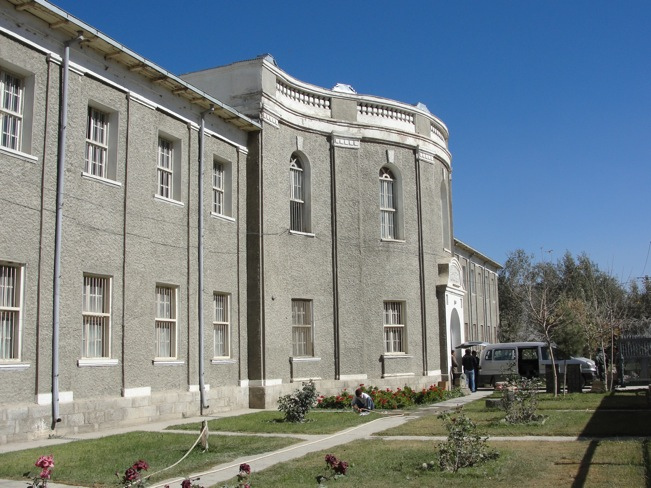
Courtyard of the building in 2010

Between 2003 and 2006, about $350,000 was spent to refurbish the building. Many of the most precious objects had been sealed in metal boxes and removed for safety and were recovered and inventoried in 2004.

Some archeological objects were found in vaults in Kabul, while a collection was also discovered in Switzerland.

Since 2007, UNESCO and Interpol have helped to recover over 8,000 artefacts, the most recent being a limestone sculpture from Germany and 843 artefacts returned by the British Museum in July 2012, including the famous 1st Century Begram Ivories.

In 2013, the Mobile Museum Project was started by the museum in cooperation with the Oriental Institute of the University of Chicago which brought 3D replicas of artefacts from the Kabul museum to schools across Afghanistan from 2013 to 2016. A number of new facilities were also added to the museum during that period.

After the 2021 Taliban offensive and Fall of Kabul, Mohammad Fahim Rahimi, the director of the museum since 2016, vowed to stay on as director and preserve its collection, as concern grew about a possible repeat of the destruction of a fraction of the collection by the Taliban in the 1990s. As of March 2023, Mohammad Zubair Abedi is the acting director of the museum.

== Collections ==
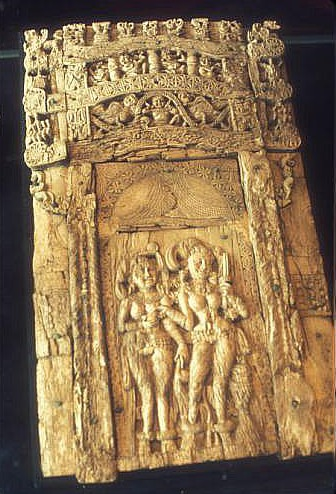
Ivory carving from the Kingdom of Kapisa, one of the capitals of the Kushan Empire (1st to 2nd Century AD).

Many treasures of ivory are stored in the museum, including antiquities from Kushan Empire and early Islam eras. One of the most famous pieces known to have survived the turbulent period in the 1990s is the Rabatak Inscription of King Kanishka.

=== Archaeological materials ===
The museum has been the repository for many of the most spectacular archaeological finds in the country.

These include:

- the painted frescos from Dilberjin;
- inscriptions, fragments of architecture, sculpture, metal objects, and coins rescued from the French excavations at Ai-Khanoum and Surkh Kotal;
- the spectacular collection of objects found at a merchants warehouse in the city of Bagram, which include ivories from India, mirrors from China, and glassware from the Roman Empire;
- the stucco heads of Hadda;
- Buddhist sculpture from Tepe Sardar and other monastic institutions in Afghanistan;
- a large collection of Islamic art from the Ghaznavids and Timurids periods found at Ghazni.

=== Numismatic collection ===
The museum has a large collection of coins, the Austrian numismatist Robert Göbl reported it contained 30,000 objects during a UNESCO sponsored audit of the collection. The collection contains the bulk of archaeological material recovered in Afghanistan. It has not been published, but individual hoards and archaeological sites have been. The French Archaeological Delegation in Afghanistan (DAFA) published the coin finds made at the town of Surkh Kotal. Some of the coins found at the excavation of Begram have been published. Part of the Mir Zakah hoard, a very unusual deposit containing enormous numbers of coins from the fourth century BC to third century AD, totalling silver and copper coins were kept in the museum. Part of the hoard was published by DAFA. The museum has appointed a curator for Numismatics but the collection remains closed to scholars and the general public.

=== The travelling collection ===
Certain important parts of the collection, including material from Bagram, Ai-Khanoum, Tepe Fullol, and the gold jewellery from all six of the excavated burials at Tillya Tepe, have been on traveling exhibition since 2006. They have been exhibited at the Guimet Museum in France, four museums in the United States, four art galleries in Australia, the Canadian Museum of History, the Bonn Museum in Germany, and most recently to the British Museum. They continue to tour and will eventually return to the Afghan National Museum.

== Gallery ==
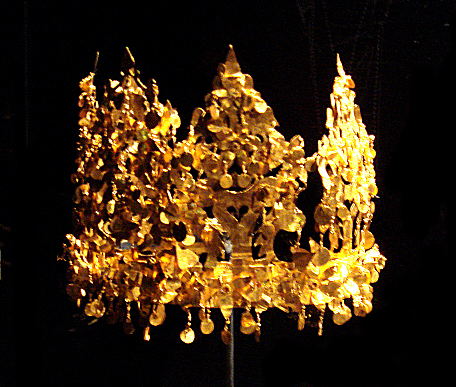
A crown belonging to a woman, Tillya Tepe, 1st century AD

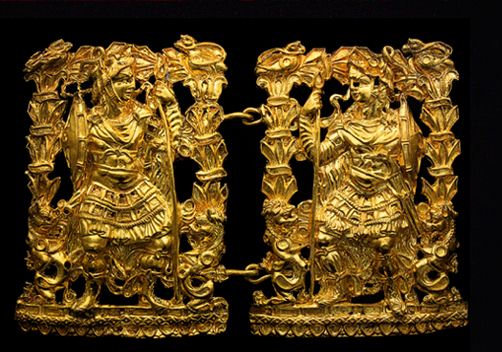
A man with a bayonet, Tillya Tepe, 1st first century AD

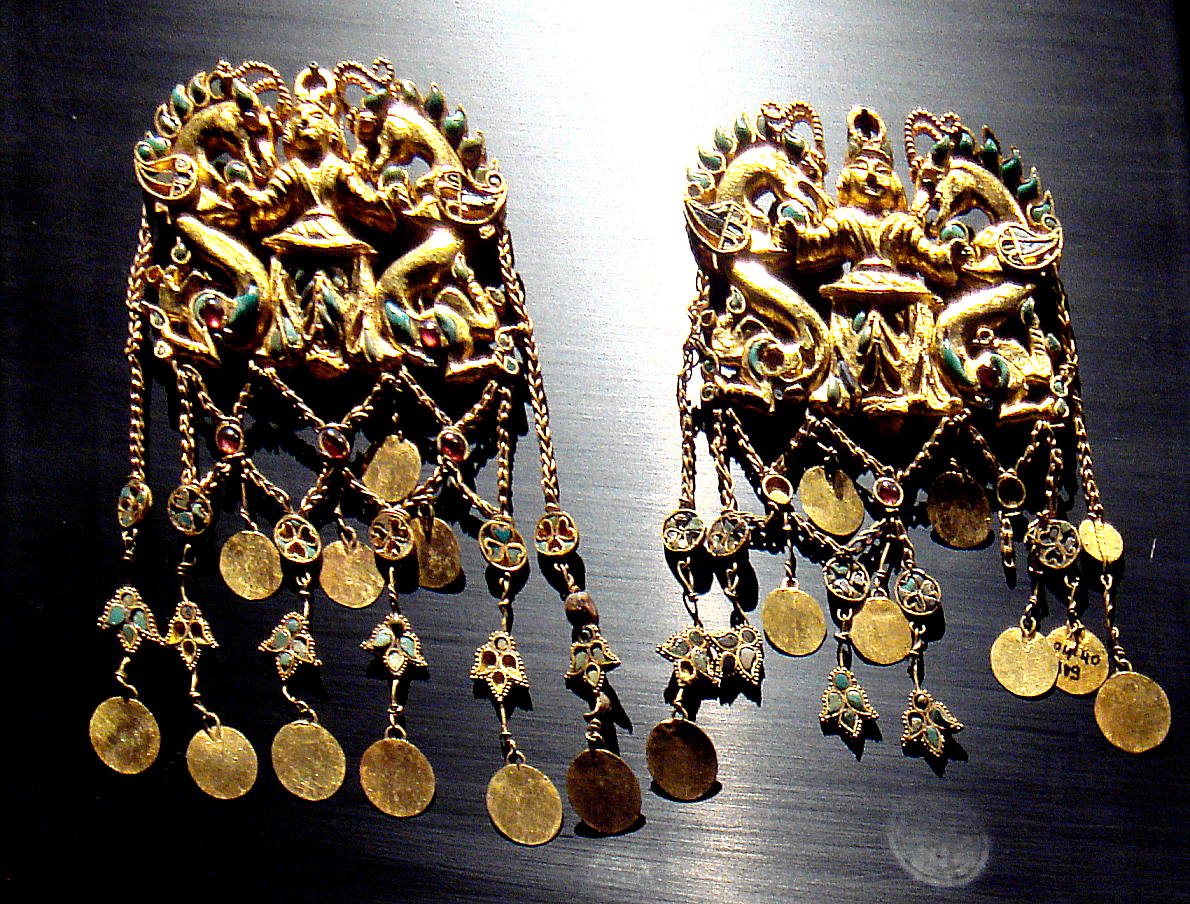
An example of gold jewelry left from the Western Scythians in Tillya Tepe, 1st century AD

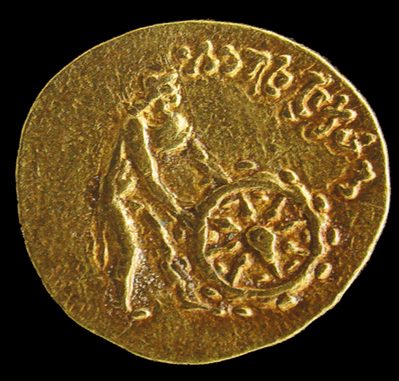
Tilia Tepe (Tillya Tepe) gold token. 1st century BCE – 1st century AD

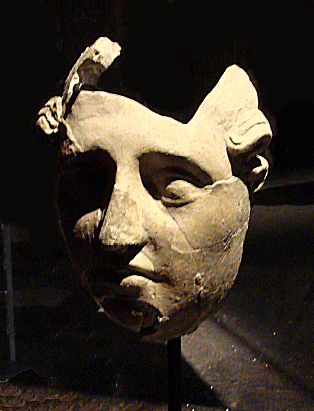
A statue of the face, Ai Khanam, 2nd century BCE

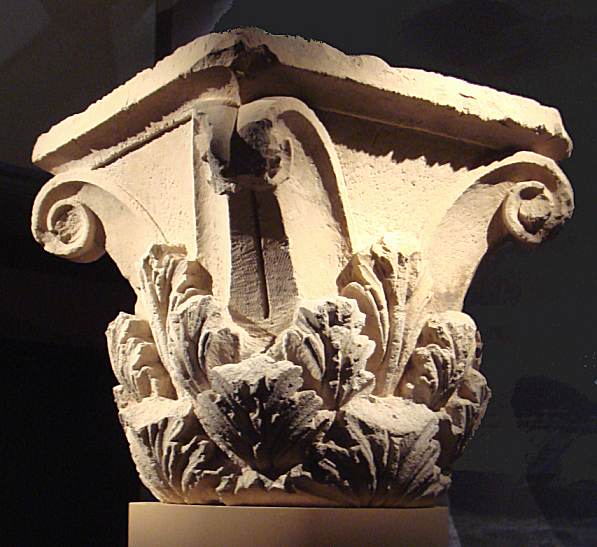
Headstone of Crete, Ikhanem, 2nd century BCE

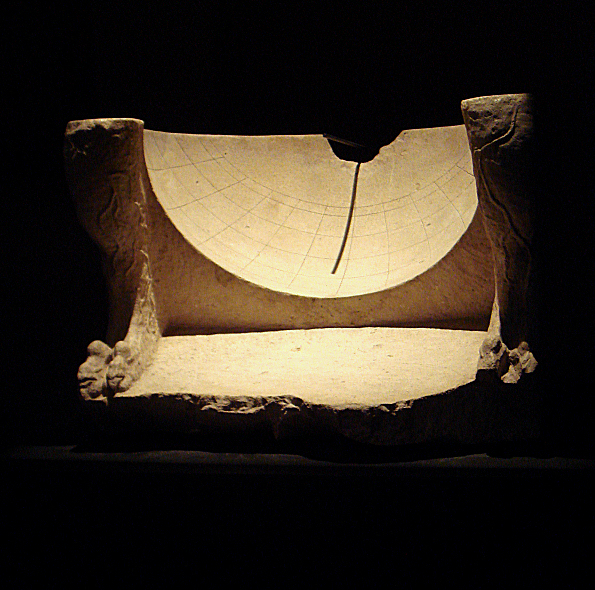
Sun dial from Ai-Khanoum

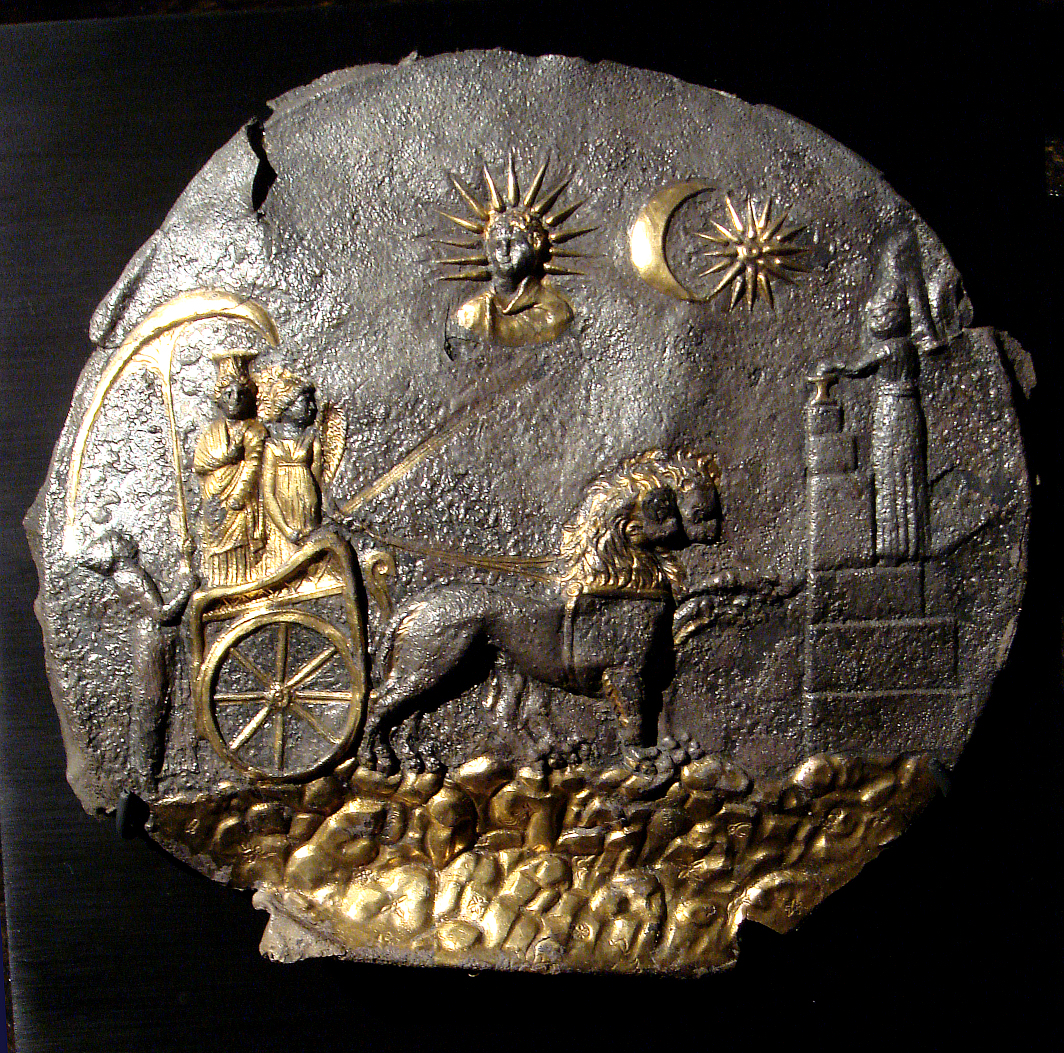
A tablet showing Cybele being drawn by two lions, Ai-Khanoum, 2nd century BCE

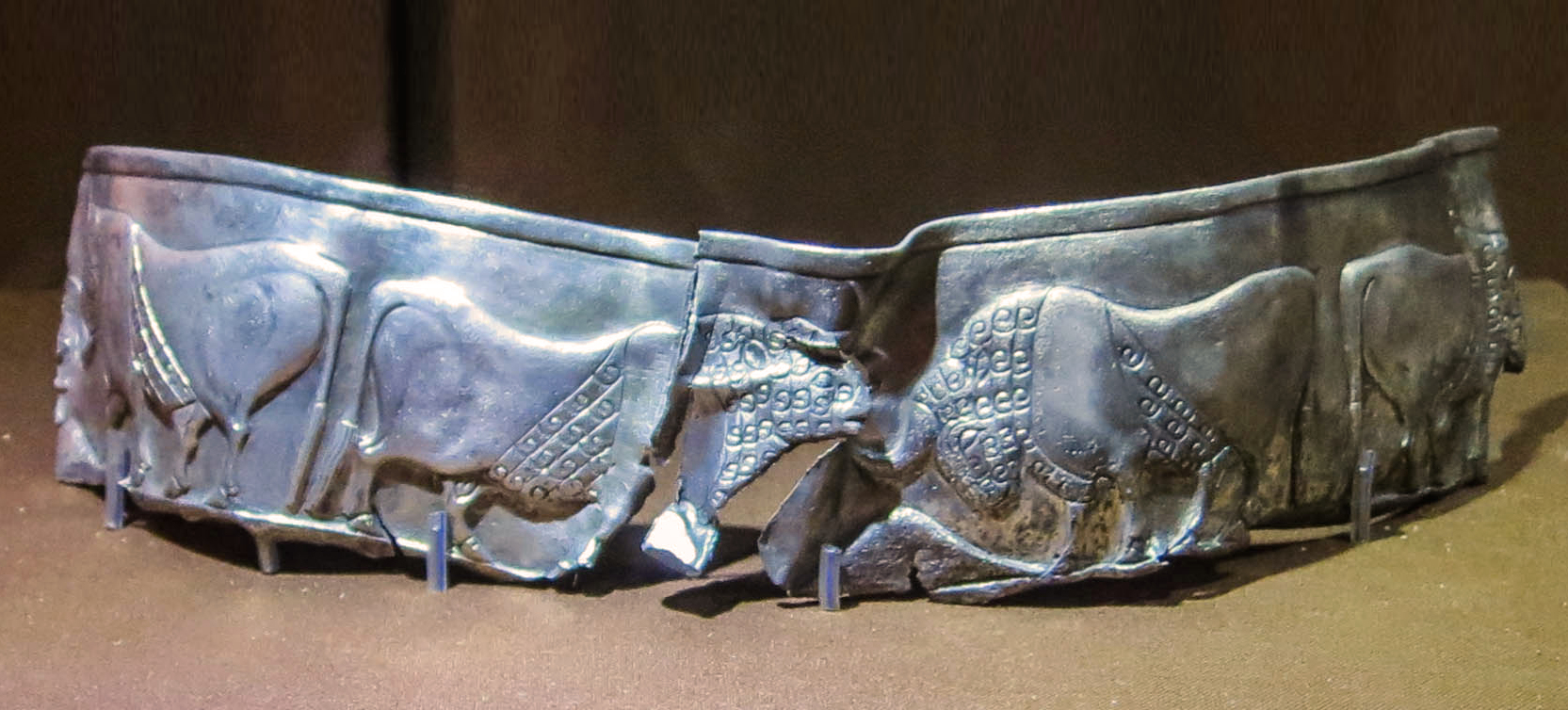
Tepe Fullol bowl fragment, 3rd millennium BCE

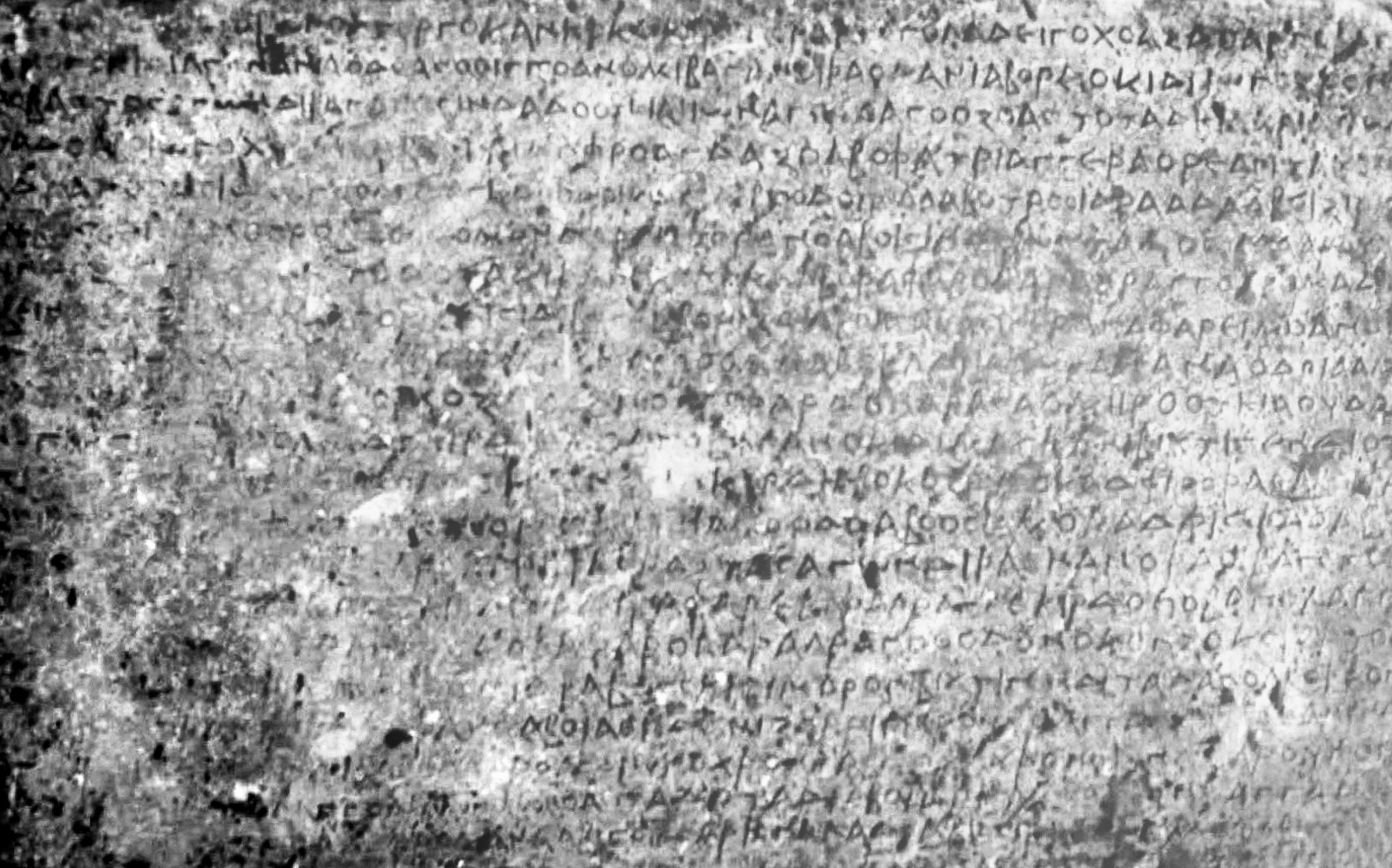
Rabatak inscription, written in the Bactrian language and Greek script, found in 1993

== See also ==
- National Archives of Afghanistan
- Culture of Afghanistan
- Carla Grissmann
