= Partage =

Partage, from the French word "partager" meaning "to share," was a system put in place to divide up ownership of excavated artifacts during the early part of the 20th century. This system was most notably employed in Egypt, Iraq, Cyprus, Syria, Turkey and Afghanistan.

Under partage, foreign-led excavation teams provided the expertise and material means to lead excavations and in return were allowed to share the finds with the local government's archaeological museums. It was through this system that the collections of archaeological museums at the University of Chicago, the University of Pennsylvania, and Harvard and Yale Universities were built up. Important parts of the collections of the British Museum, the Brooklyn Museum and the Metropolitan Museum of Art also came through partage. It was also how the collections in archaeological museums in the Middle East were built up.

According to James Cuno, "Foreign museums underwrote and led scientific excavations from which both the international archaeological and local political communities benefited." Some scholars believe that the partage system should be reinstated as a way of encouraging exchange and international education while still giving source countries authority over their cultural heritage.

On the other hand the practise is often seen as a colonialist concept and after independence from the European and Ottoman empires, these Middle Eastern countries enacted laws that declared artefacts as national cultural heritage and prevented their export thus effectively ending the practise of partage.
