= List of castles in Afghanistan =

This is a list of fortifications in Afghanistan, including fortresses and castles, arranged alphabetically.

== List ==
Castle	Location	Type	Constructed/ earliest mention	Notes	Image
Arg	Kabul	Presidential palace	1880	The Arg means 'citadel' in Pashto. The Arg was built after the destruction of the Bala Hissar in 1880 by the British Indian troops.	
Bagh-e Bala Palace	Kabul	Palace	1893	Former royal palace built by Emir Abdur Rahman Khan.	
Bala Hissar	Kabul	Fort	5th century	The estimated date of construction is around the 5th century AD.	
Chihil Sutun	Kabul	Palace	1888	Historic maps also refer to the palace as Hendaki.	
Citadel of Ghazni	Ghazni	Citadel	13th century	It was built in the 13th century surrounding Ghazni to form a walled city.	
Darul Aman Palace	Kabul	Palace	1927	In 2019, the palace was fully renovated for the 100th year of Afghan Independence, which was on the 19th of August, 2019.	
Farah Citadel	Farah	Citadel		Also known as the Citadel of Alexander, and locally known as Shar-e-Farahdun. Some claim it was built by Alexander the Great. Others say the citadel is to have been built by Zoroastrian warriors in the time of Darius the Great (reigned 522-486 BC). Some renovations built atop the ancient foundation may add to the confusion regarding the age of the Citadel.	
Herat Citadel	Herat	Citadel	330 BC	Also known as the Citadel of Alexander, and locally known as Qala Iktyaruddin. Many empires have used it as a headquarters in the last 2,000 years, and was destroyed and rebuilt many times over the centuries.	
Lashkari Bazar	Bost	Palace			
Paghman Hill Castle	Paghman	Palace	2014	It was planned to be used for major festivals. The castle and surrounding areas are used as a presidential retreat and a location to host foreign guests.	
Palace of Sultan Mas'ud III	Ghazni	Palace	1112	Ghaznavid palace.	
Qala-e-Bost	Bost	Fort			
Qala-e-Seraj	Mihtarlam	Palace	1912–13	Built by Amir Habibullah Khan.	
Qala-i-Jangi	Mazar-i-Sharif	Fort	1889	The Afghans built the fort in 1889 for defense against potentially invading British after the Second Anglo-Afghan War. It took 18,000 workers 12 years to complete it.	
Qalat-e Gilzay	Qalati Ghilji	Fort	4th century BC	The fortress constructed by the forces of Alexander the Great.	
Tajbeg Palace	Kabul	Palace	1795	Inaccurately called the Queen's Palace. According to some historians, the palace seems to have been renovated by Zaman Shah Durrani in 1795 (1210 AH), which was subsequently destroyed in military conflicts, and the ruins from ancient times remain.	
Ibrahim Khan Sanjrani Fort	Chakhansur District	Fort	13th/19th century	The seat of a local Sanjrani Chiefdom at the beginning of the 13th/19th century.	
