= Qala-e-Seraj =

Palace in Afghanistan

- Location within Afghanistan

General information
- Type: Palace
- Location: Mehtarlam, Laghman Province, Afghanistan
- Coordinates: 34.6651618°N 70.2110850°E
- Completed: c. 1912–13
- Renovated: 2020

Qala-e-Seraj, also known as Seraj Castle, is a palace located in Mehtarlam, the capital of Laghman Province in eastern Afghanistan. It was built by Amir Habibullah Khan c. 1912–13 to spend his winters there. Local officials spent 22 million Afs and two years to rebuild the castle, with work being completed in 2020.

== Description ==
The castle has two buildings, four towers, and a mosque structure.

== See also ==
- List of castles in Afghanistan
