= Paghman District =

- District
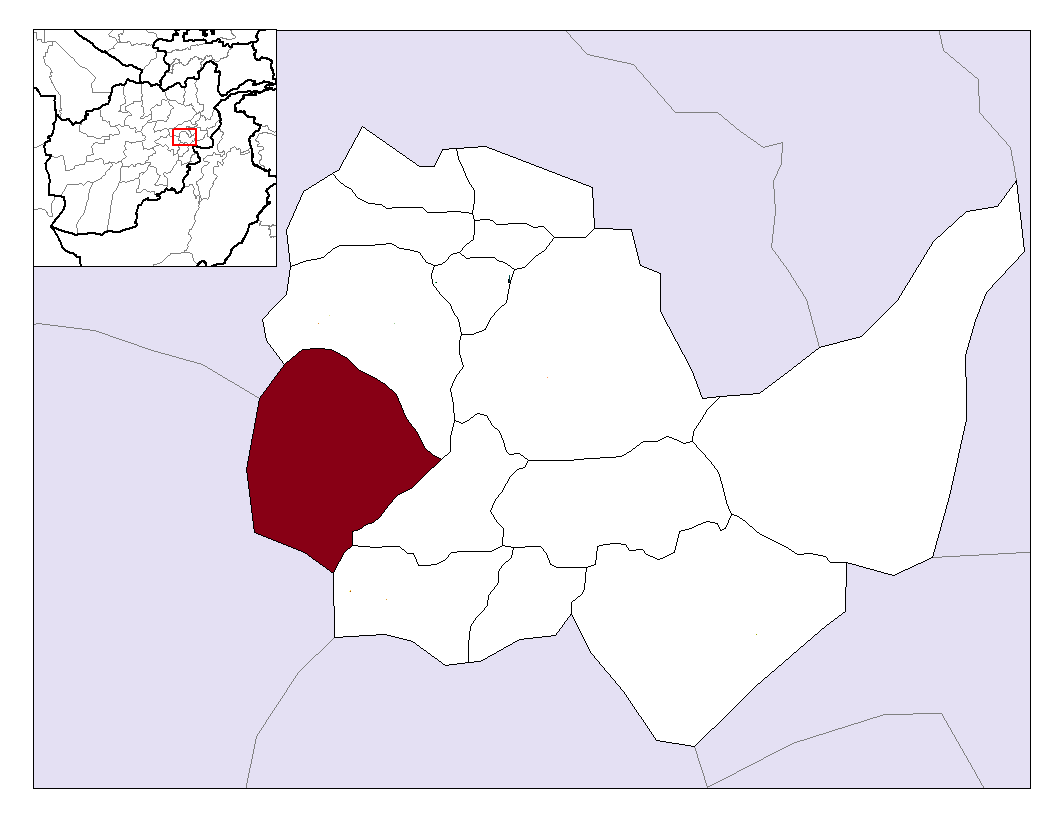
- Location in Kabul Province
- Coordinates: 34.5833°N 68.9500°E
- Country: Afghanistan
- Province: Kabul Province
- Capital: Paghman

Area
  - Total: 600 km^{2} (230 sq mi)

Population (2019)
  - Total: 200,000
  - Density: 330/km^{2} (860/sq mi)
- Time zone: UTC+04:30 (AST)
- Main languages: Farsi (Dari); Pashto

Paghman District is in the western part of Kabul Province, Afghanistan. It has a population of over 120,000 people (2002 UNHCR estimate).

Paghman district borders Wardak and Parwan provinces to the west, Shakardara District to the north, Kabul to the east and Char Asiab District to the south-east. Its headquarters is the town of Paghman, which is in the northeastern part of the district.

Due to the wars in the region, 50% of the buildings in the district were destroyed and many people fled. Agriculture, labour work, animal husbandry and employment in Kabul City are the major sources of income. The many villages of the district include Dara Pashayee, Adam Khel Kala, Hatam Kala, Seeno Kala, Mullah Khel Kala, Muhabbat Khan Kala, Lachi Khel Kala, Pajakk Tappa, etc.

== See also ==
- Paghman
- Paghman Gardens
