= Taq-e Zafar =

Memorial arch in Paghman, Afghanistan

- طاق ظفر
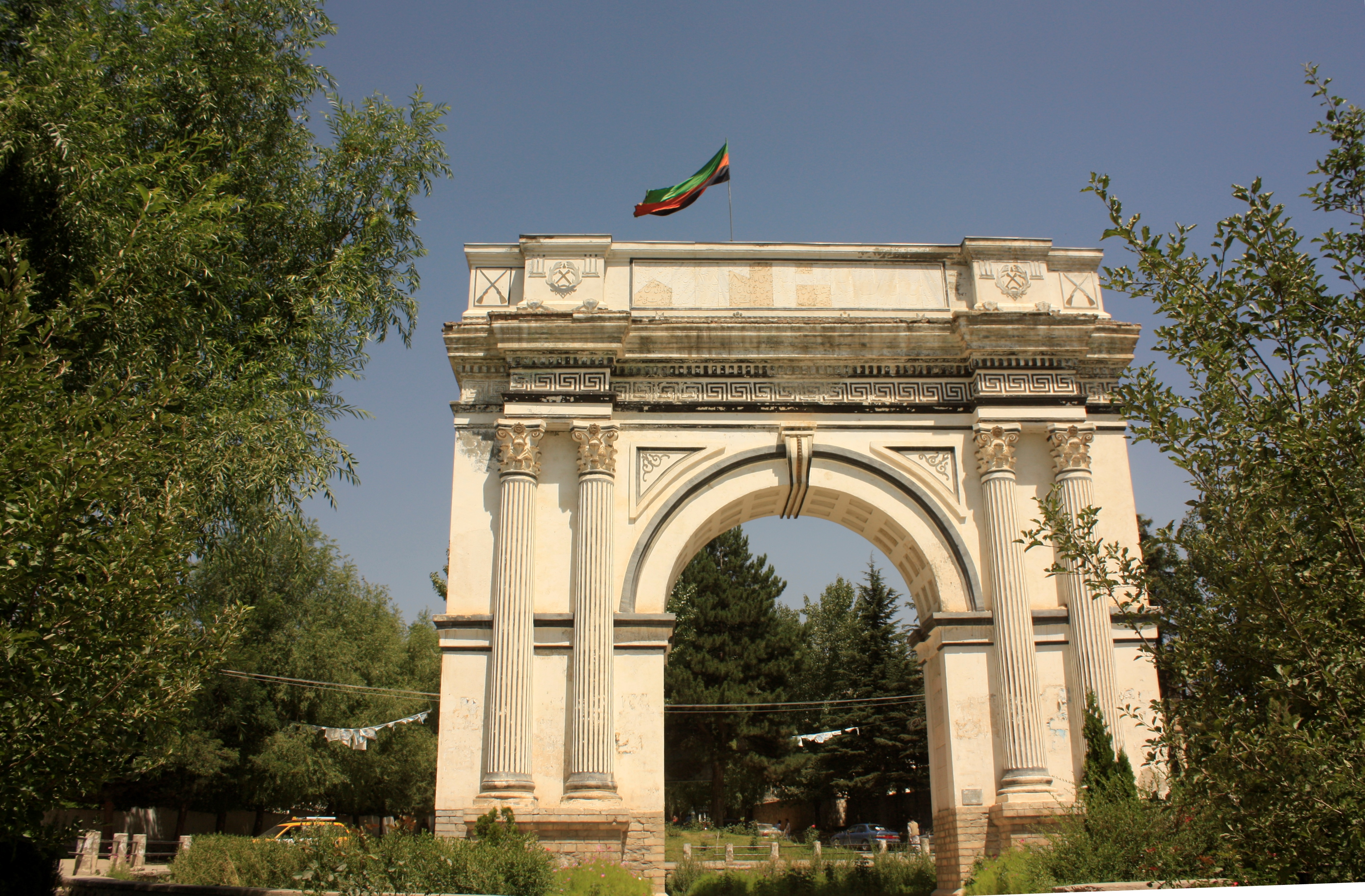
- Taq-e Zafar in 2014

General information
- Type: Memorial arch
- Architectural style: Neoclassicism
- Location: Paghman, Kabul Province, Afghanistan
- Coordinates: 34.5900110°N 68.9584813°E
- Completed: 1928

Design and construction
- Other designers: Sayed Mohammad Daud al-Hossaini (calligraphy)

The Taq-e Zafar (Note: Pashto: طاق ظف Dari: طاق ظف) ("Arch of Victory") is a memorial arch located at the front of the gardens in Paghman, Afghanistan. The famous victory arch commemorates Afghan independence after the Third Anglo-Afghan War in 1919.

== History ==
=== 20th Century ===
==== Construction ====
The monument was constructed after King Amanullah Khan and Queen Soraya Tarzi's return from Europe in 1928. Amanullah brought in foreign experts to redesign Kabul. A Turkish architect designed the victory arch. At that time, at the entrance of Paghman, they created a triumphal arch or monumental gate in the style of Greco-Roman classical architecture, similar to but smaller than the Arc de Triomphe in Paris, France.

Paghman turned into a holiday retreat as well as the summer capital. Its wide avenues contained fir, poplar and nut trees which flew past the arch, villas and a golf course. It was a popular place for the wealthy and the aristocrats to visit. The gardens eventually became a popular place for local and foreign tourists.

==== Destruction ====
During the Soviet–Afghan War in the 1980s, Paghman was a major battleground and suffered from bombardment from both the Soviet-backed government and the mujahideen rebels. Most buildings were destroyed and residents had fled. Little remained of the prosperous Gardens, save for the remains of the Arc de Triomphe style arch, which had its top blown off.

=== Restoration and 21st century ===
Following the formation of the Karzai administration, the Arch was restored by May 2005. Other damaged parts of the former Gardens were also rebuilt. It once again became a popular touristic site, and is popular with residents of Kabul. There was further development in the 2010s. The park is also used for dog-fighting contests.

== Design ==
The Victory Arch is made of white marble. Afghan calligrapher Sayed Mohammad Daud al-Hossaini designed the calligraphic inscriptions on the ceiling and walls of the arch.

== Gallery ==
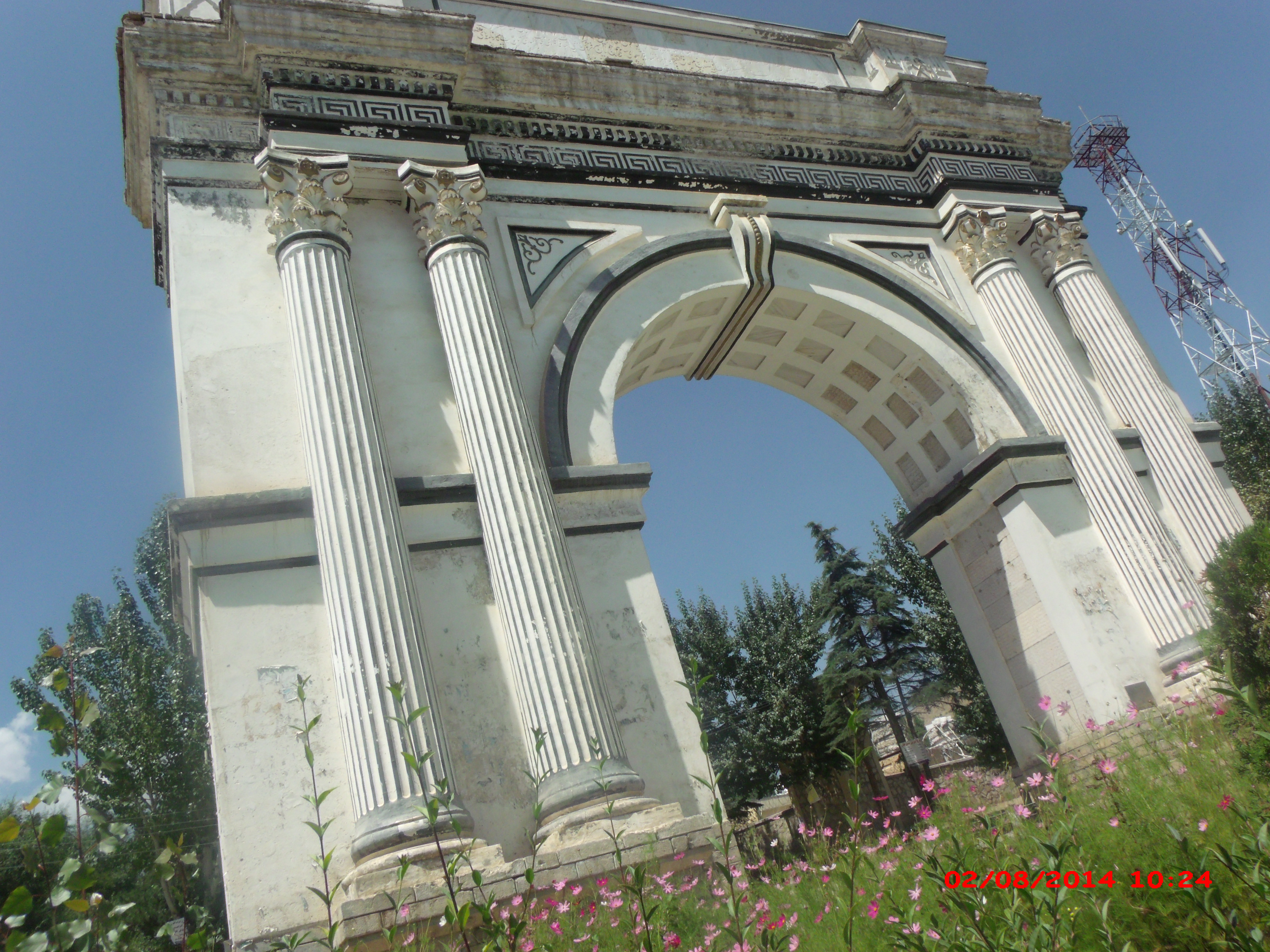
Victory Arch in 2014

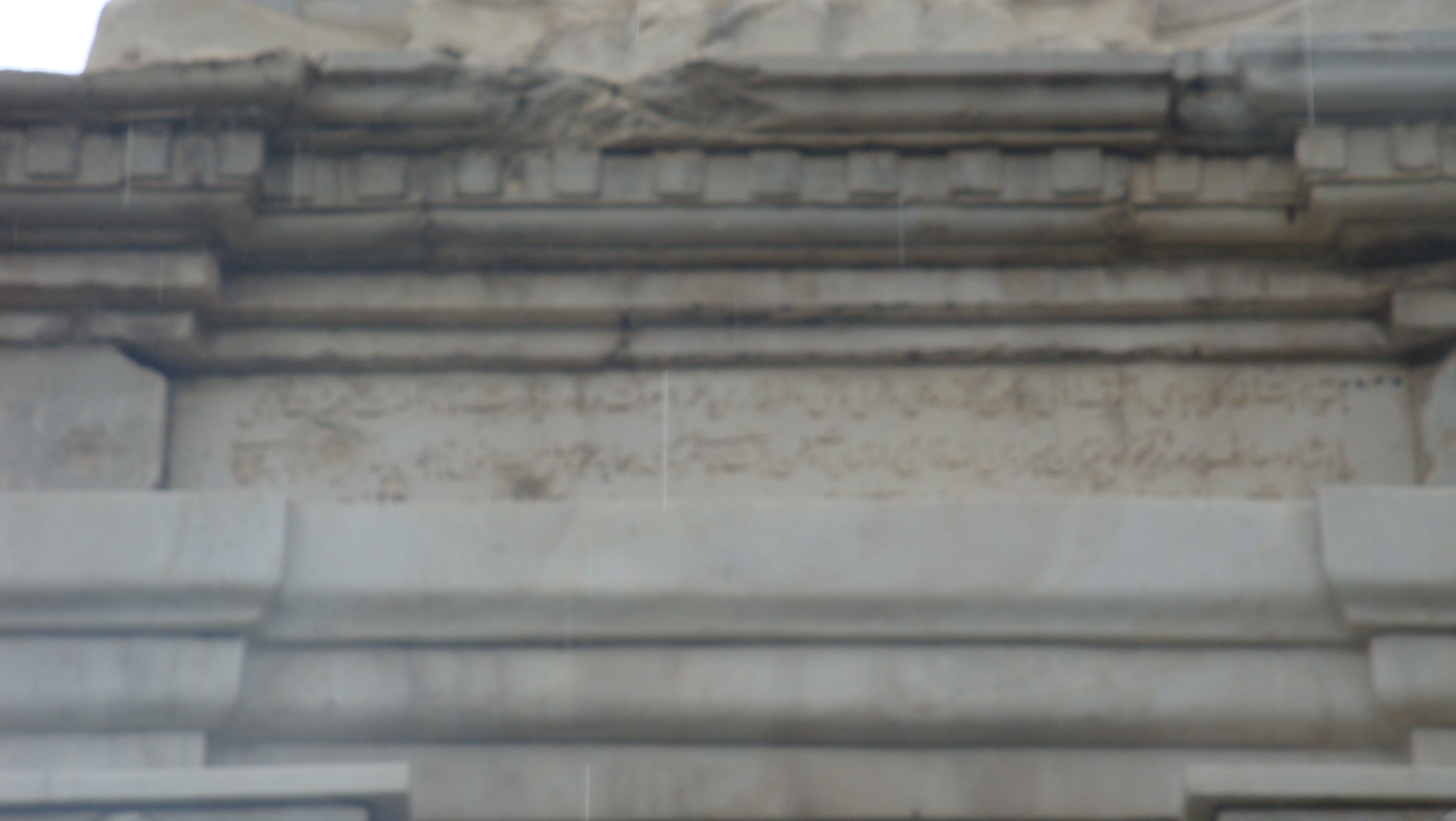

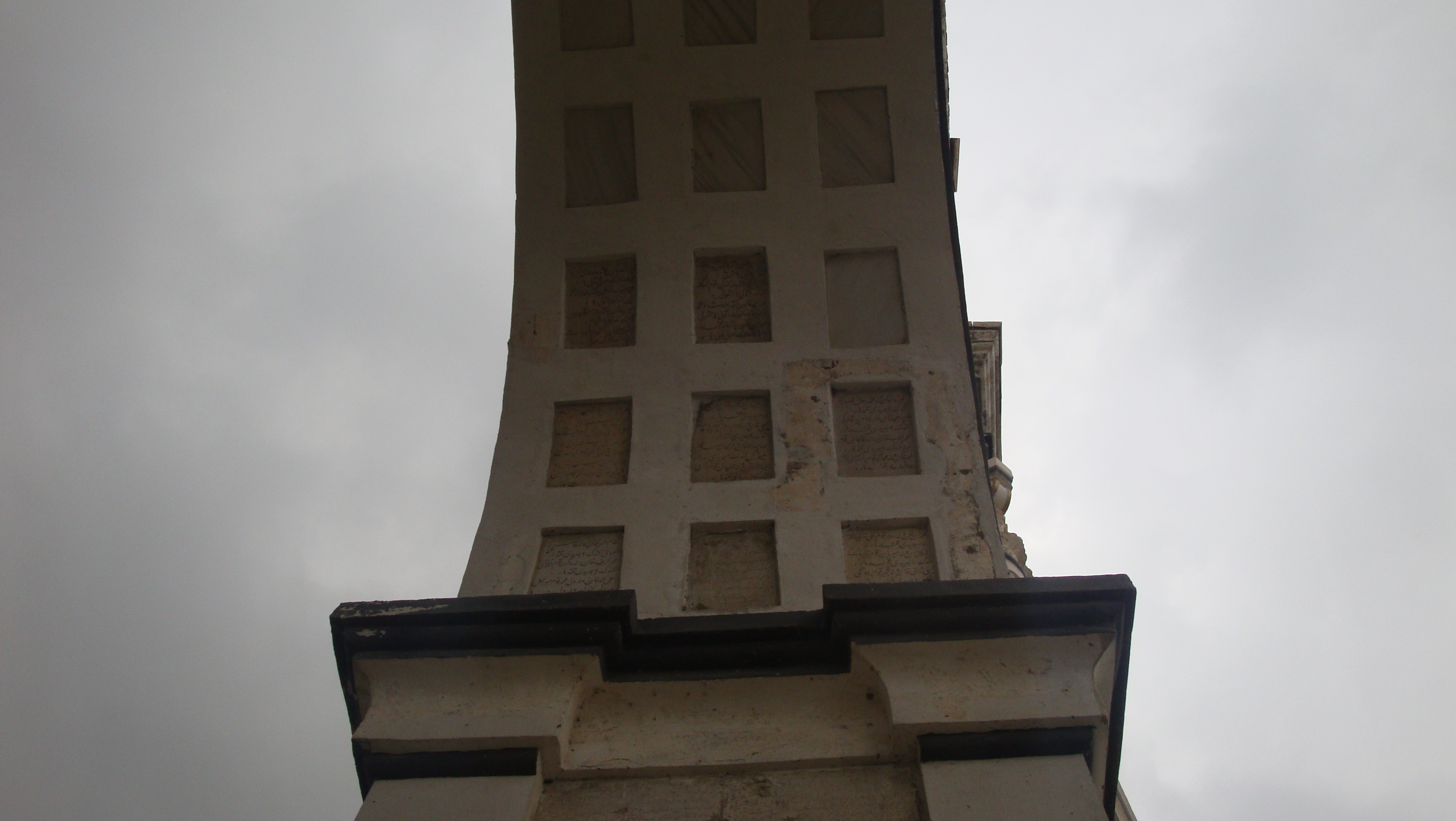

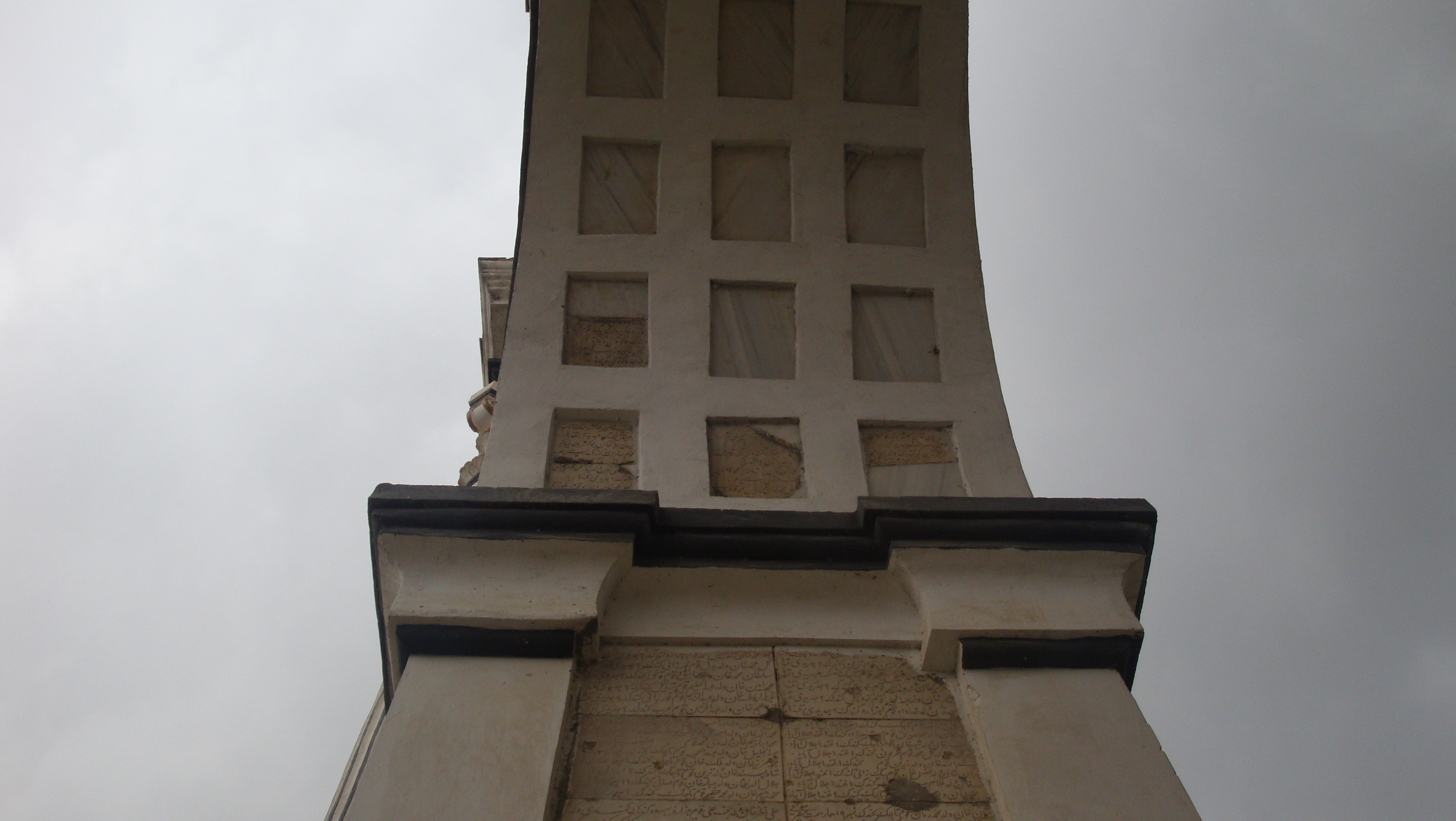

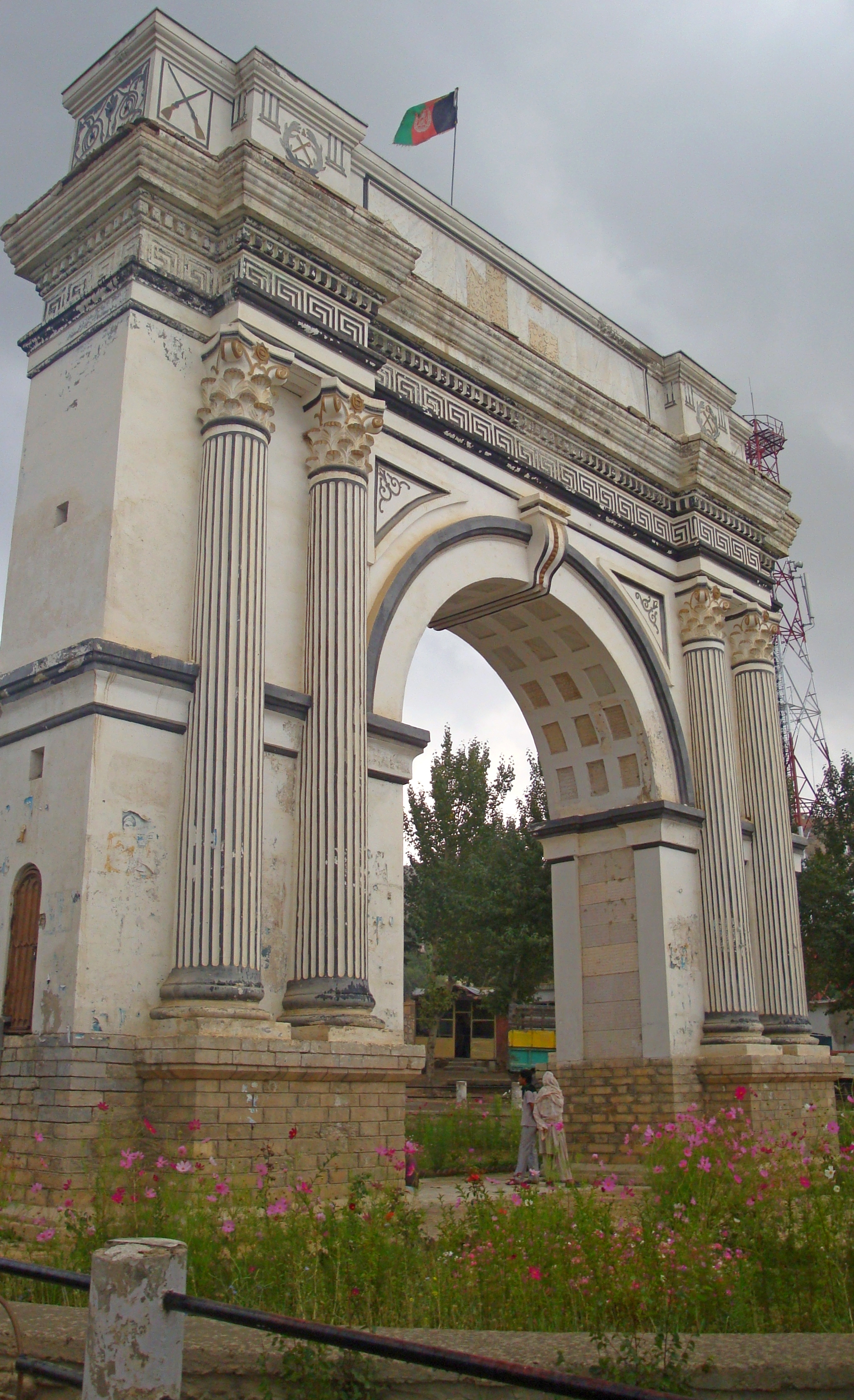

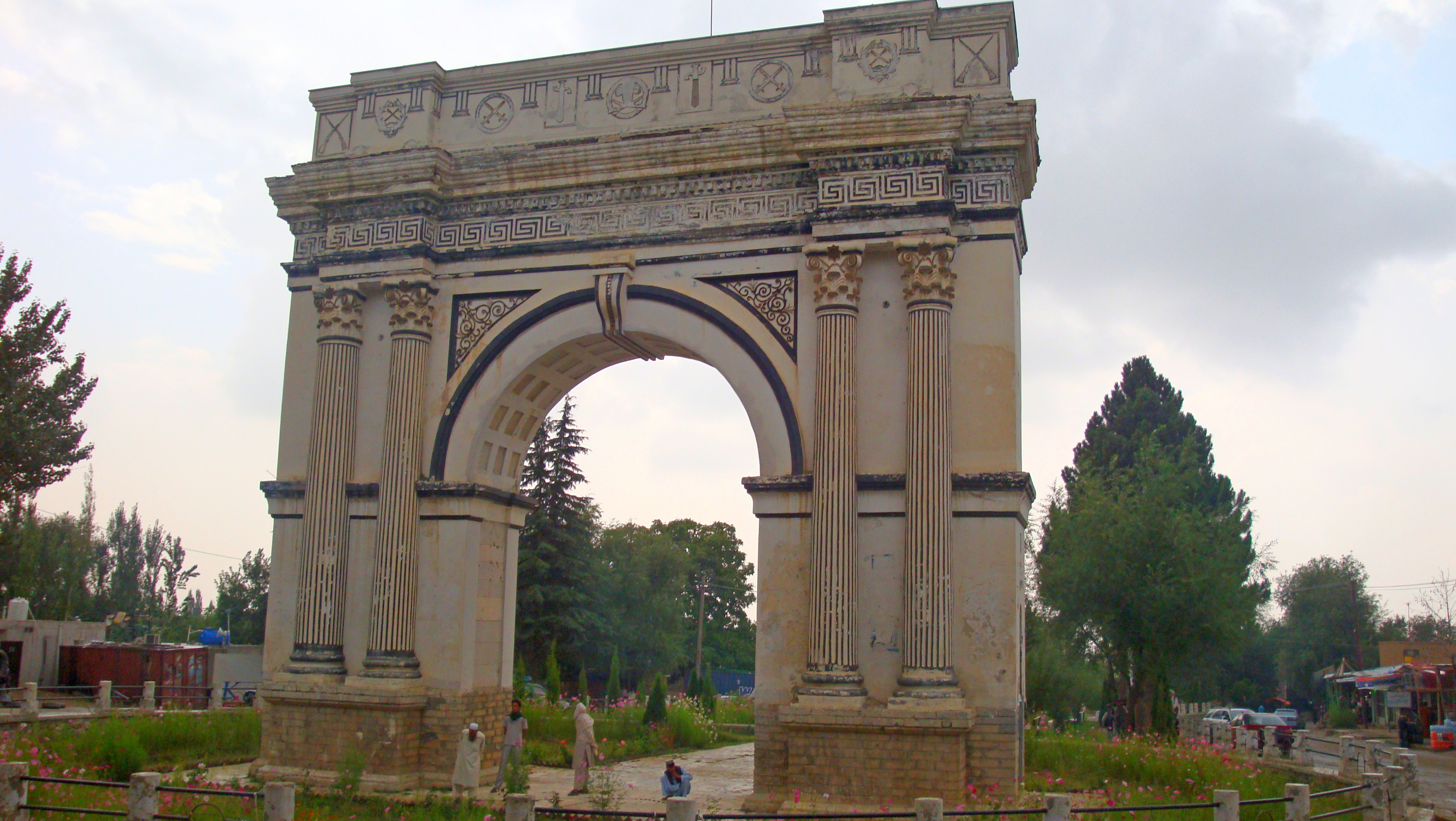

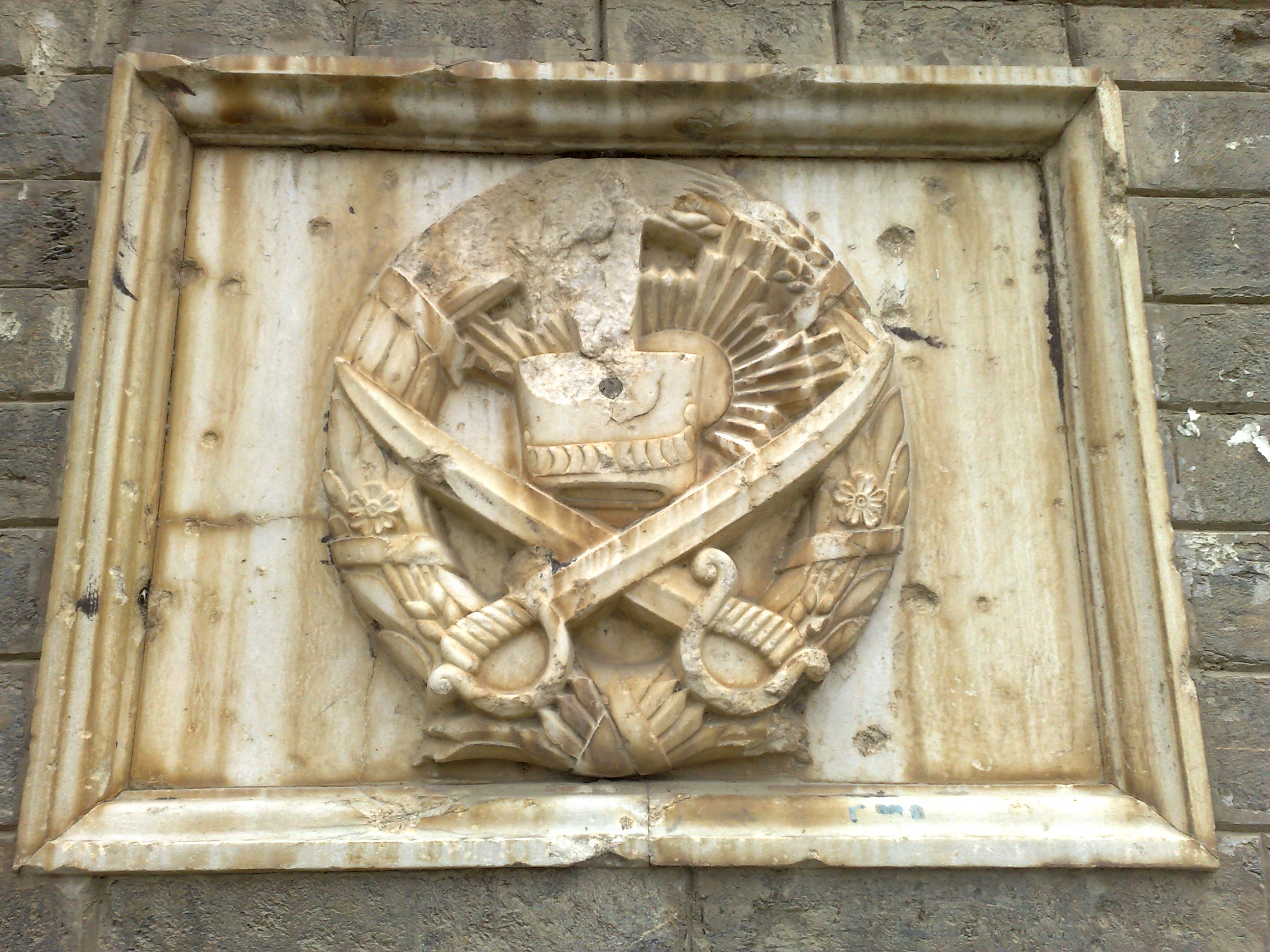
Emblem of King Amanullah Khan

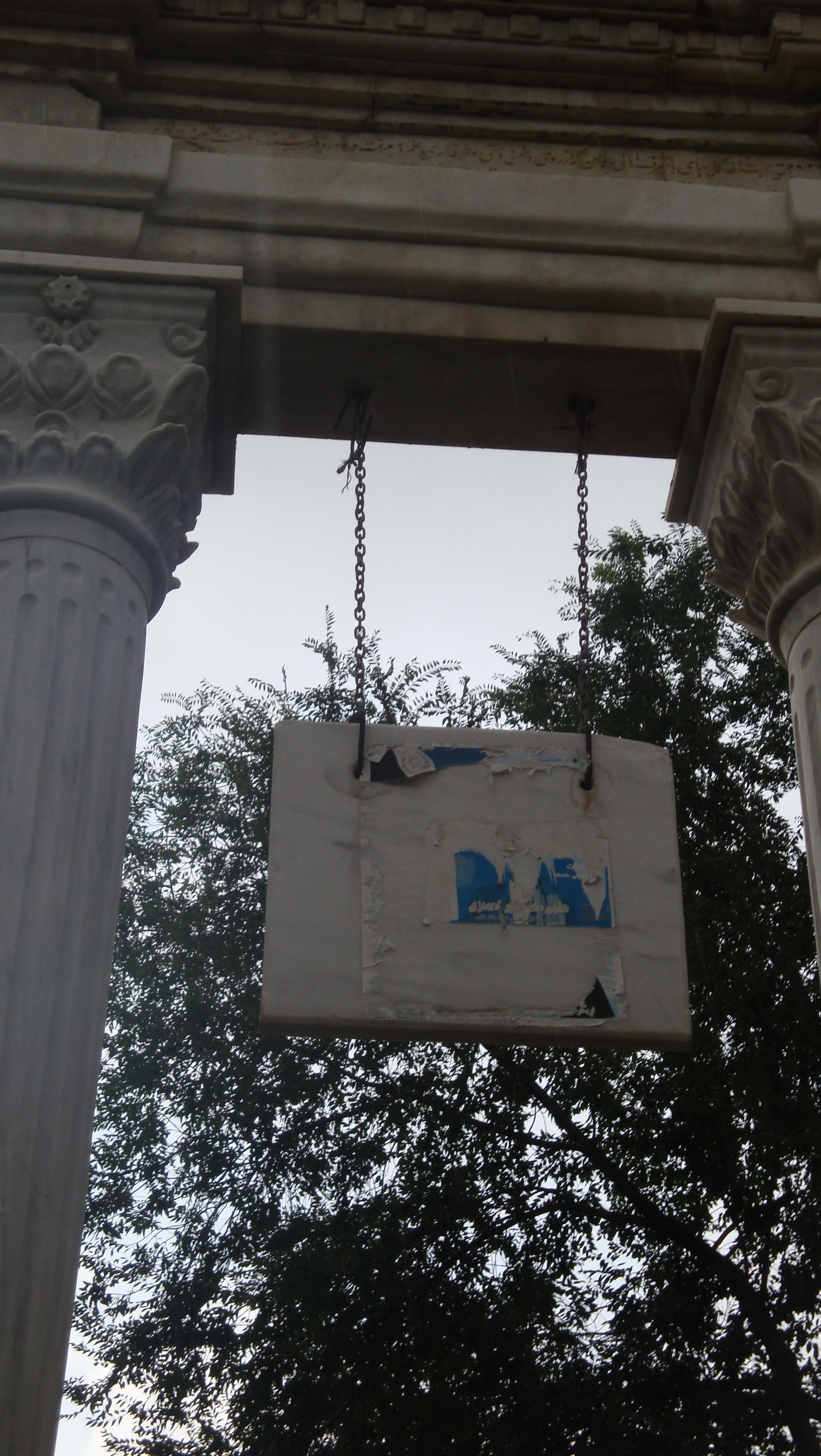

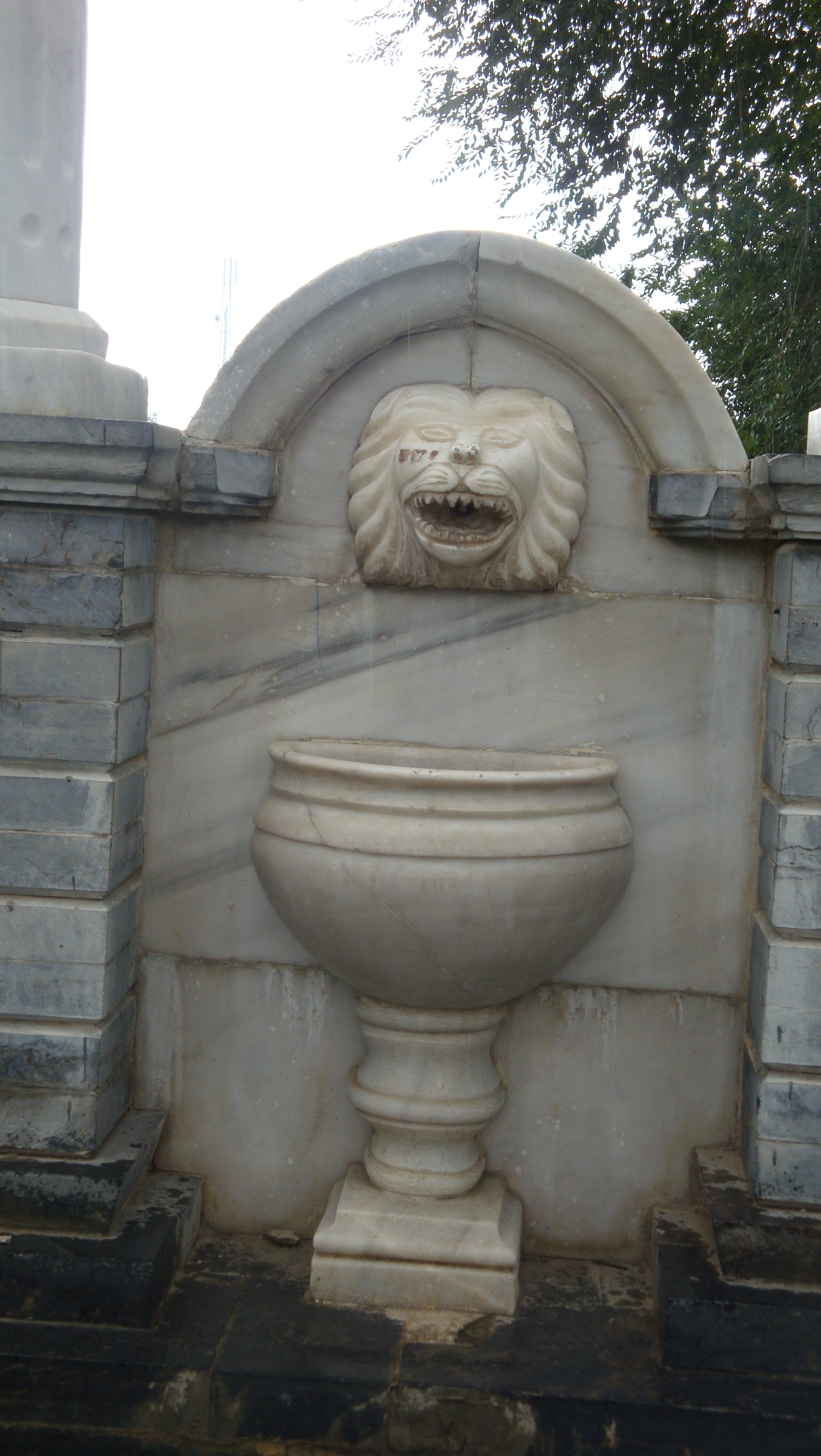
Lion Gate

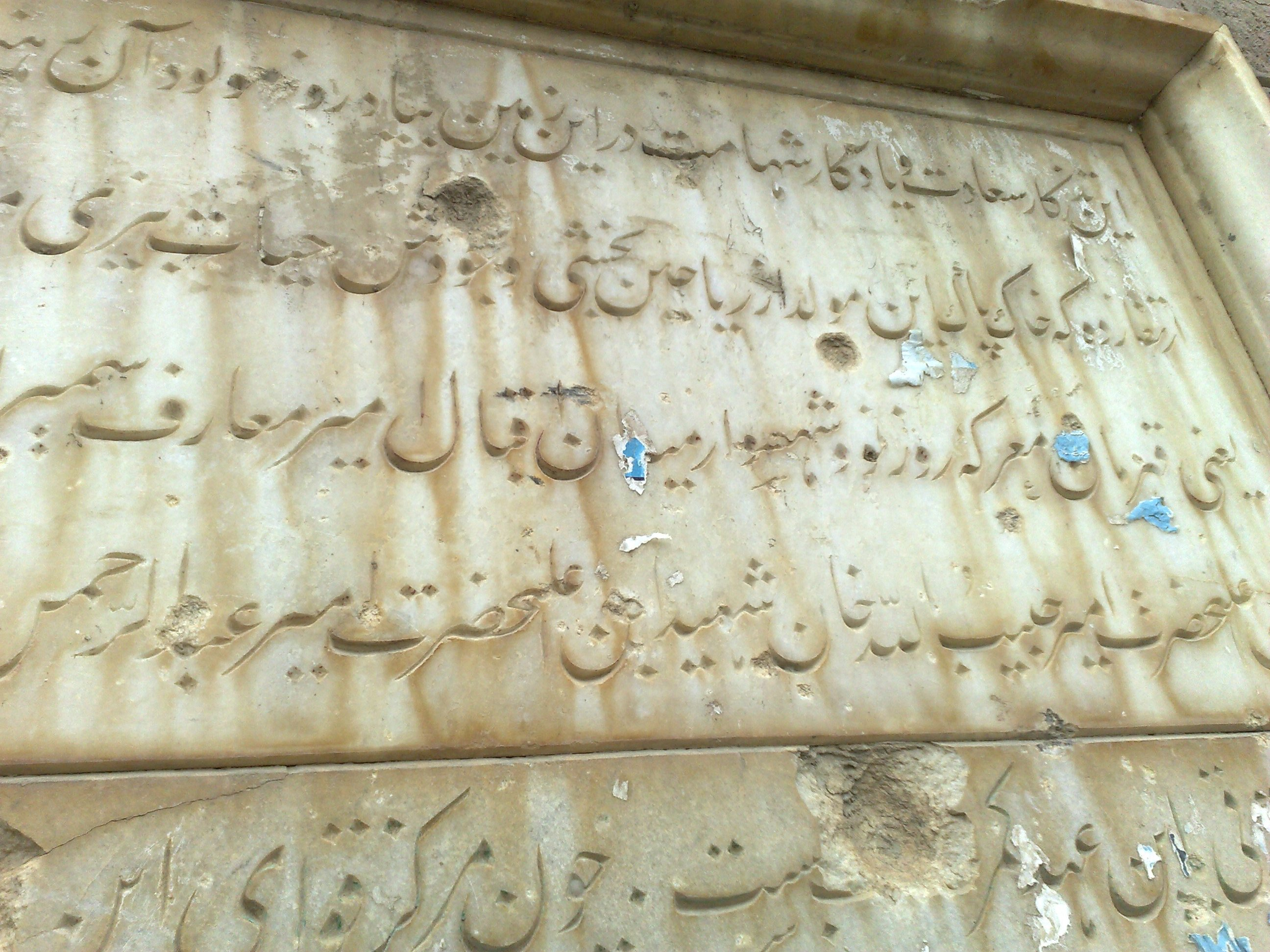
Inscriptions

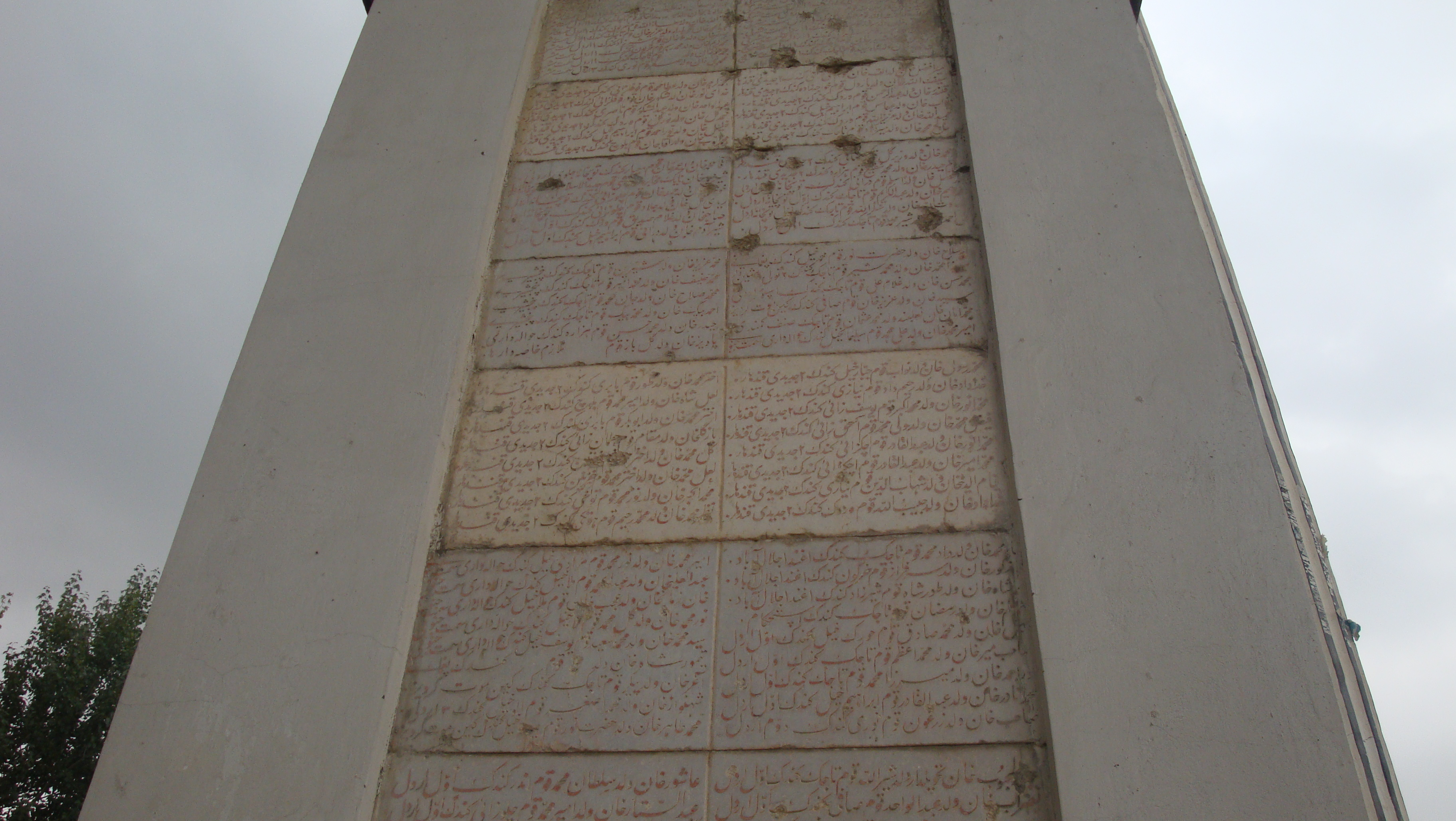

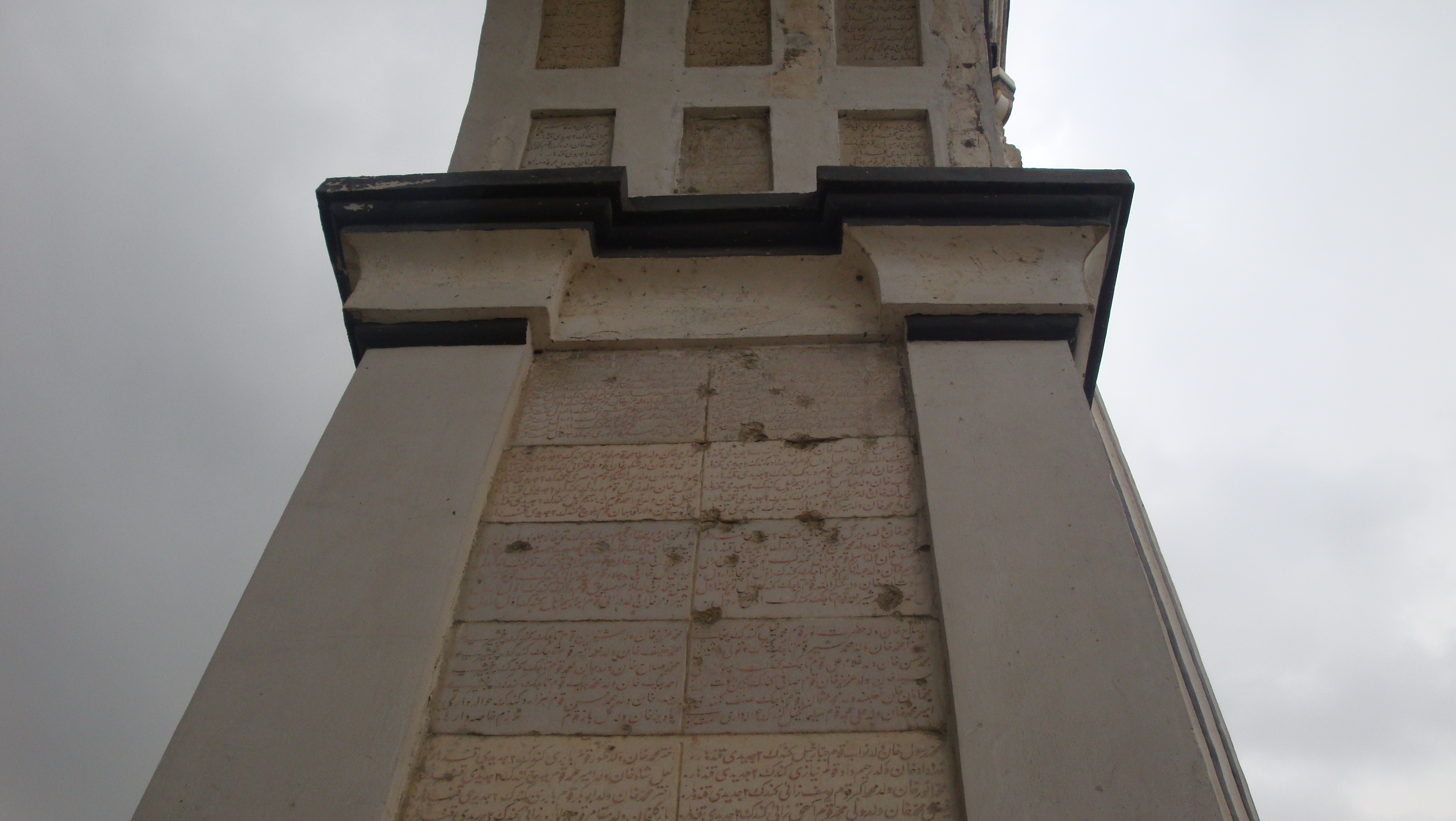

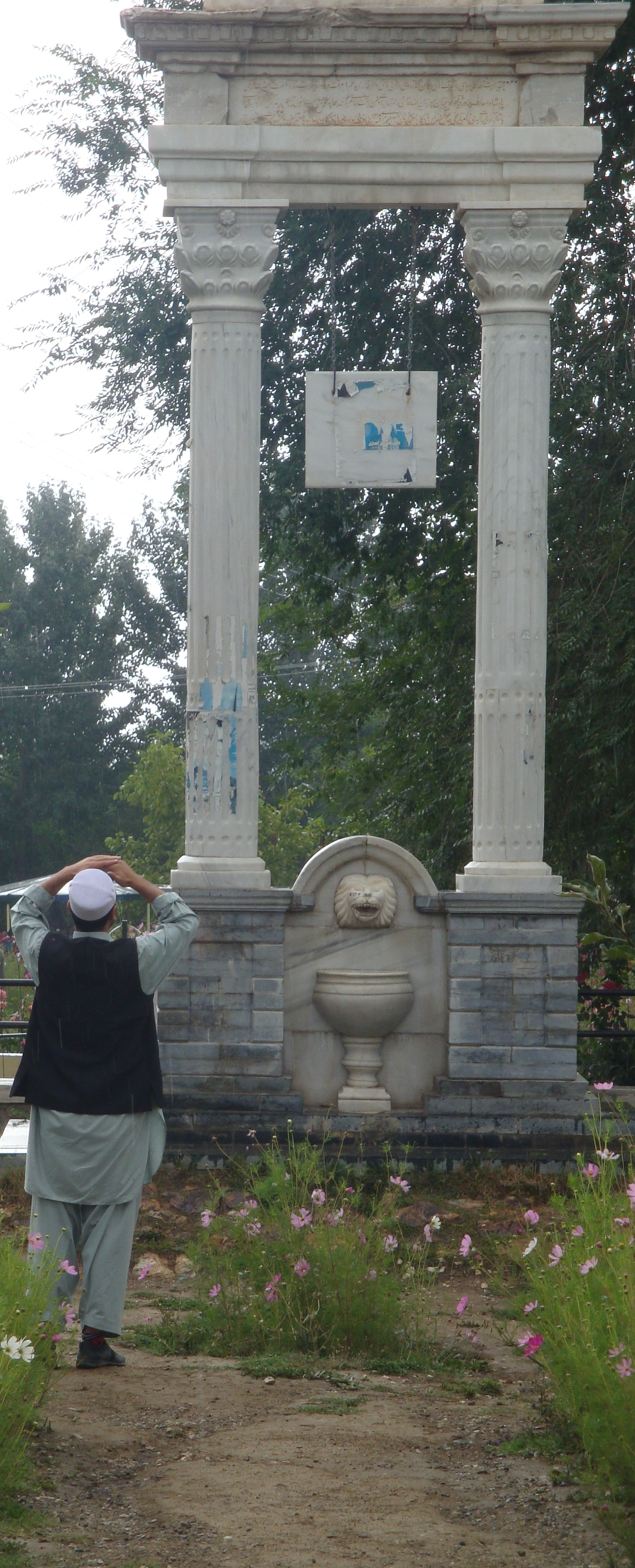

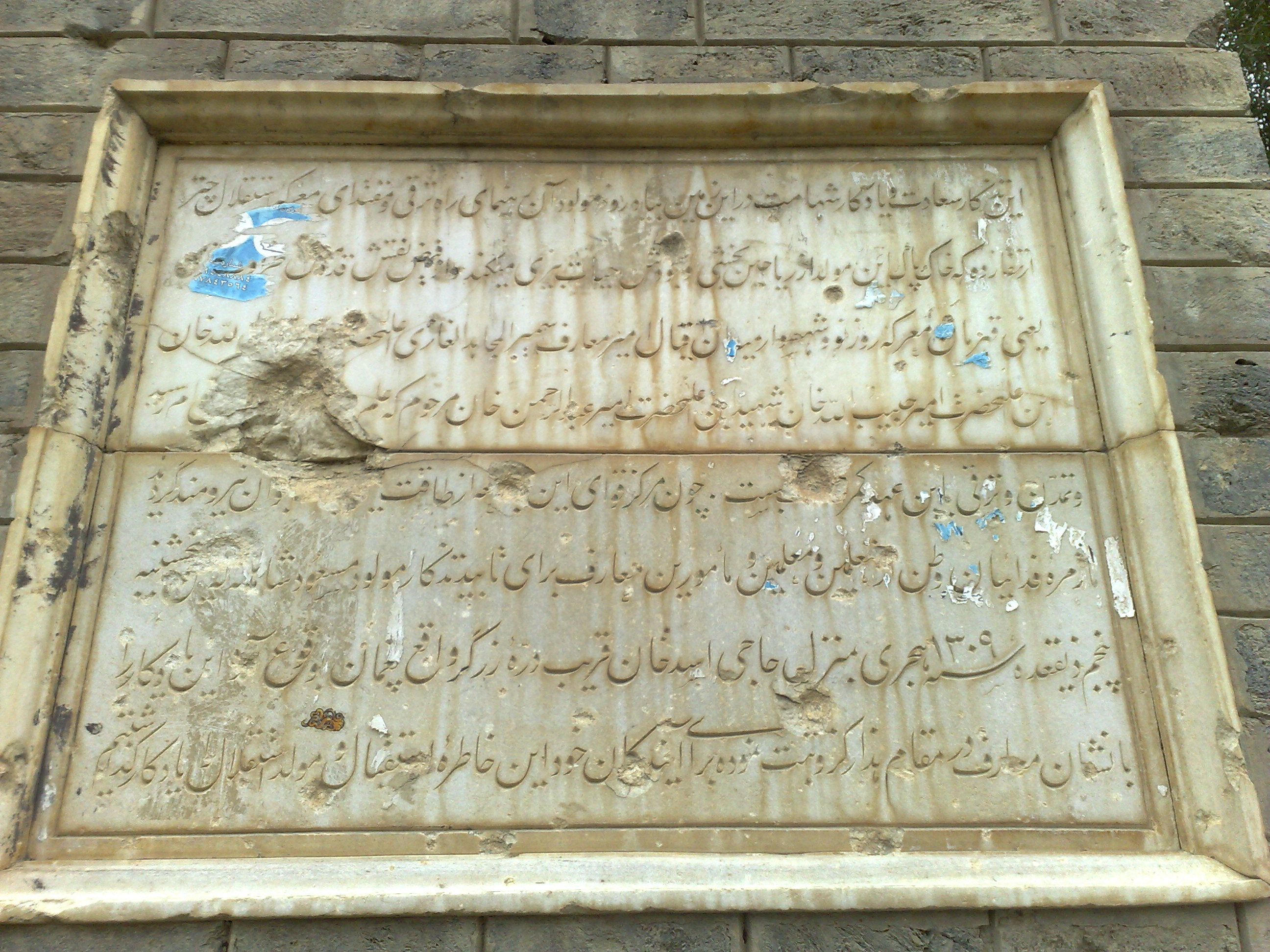

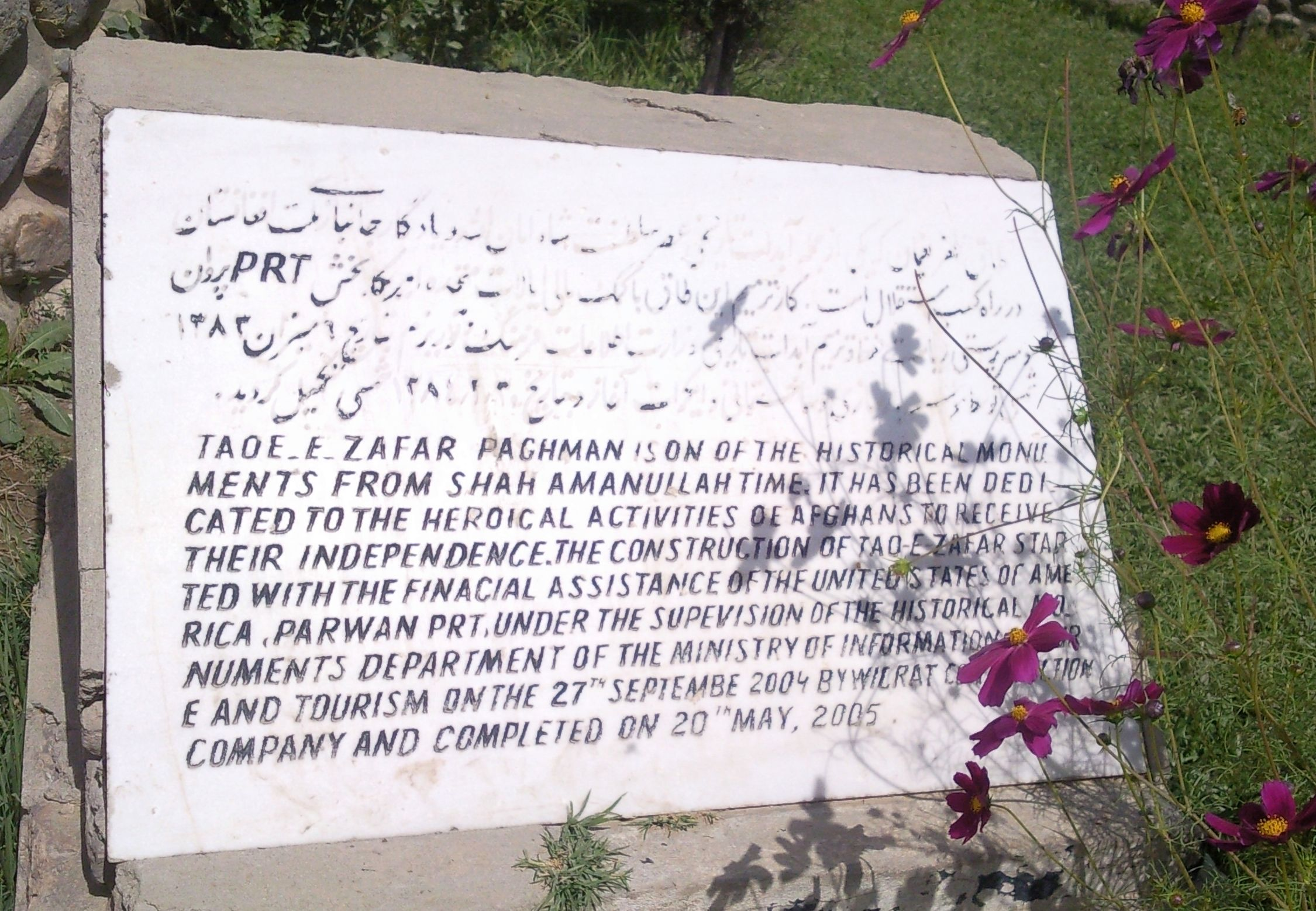
Stone marking its 2005 reconstruction

== See also ==
- Afghan Independence Day
- List of post-Roman triumphal arches
