= Paghman Hill Castle =

Palace in Kabul, Afghanistan

Coordinates: 34.584844°N 68.969464°E

- د پغمان ماڼۍ
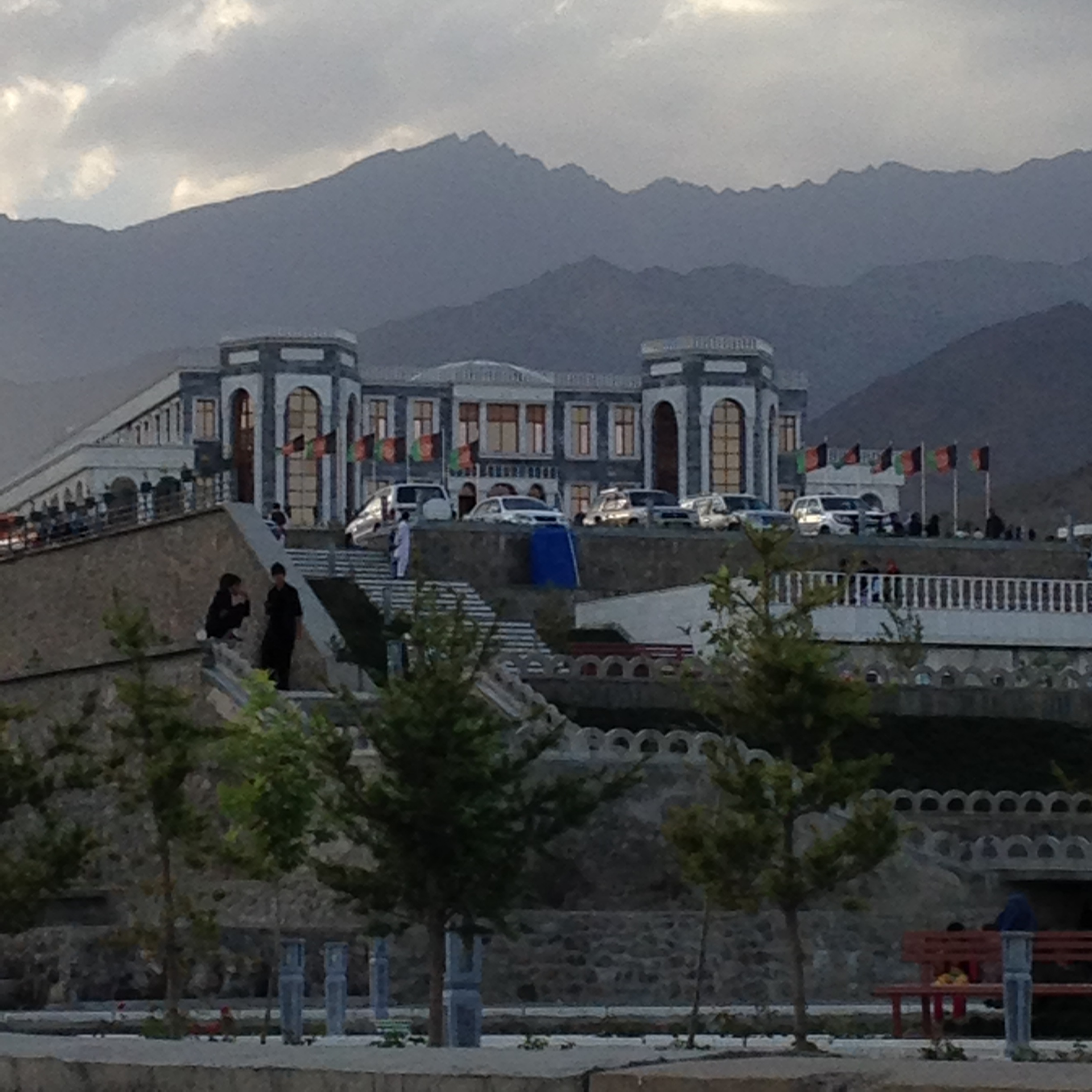
- Paghman Hill Palace in 2014

- Paghman Hill Castle in Afghanistan

General information
- Status: Completed
- Type: Palace
- Architectural style: Neoclassical
- Location: Paghman, Kabul Province, Afghanistan
- Construction started: March 2013
- Completed: 2014
- Cost: $15 million

Technical details
- Material: Marble; Wood
- Floor count: 3

Paghman Hill Castle, also known as Paghman Palace (Pashto: د پغمان ماڼۍ), is located in the town of Paghman in Afghanistan, a short distance northwest of the city of Kabul. The site opened to the public in 2014 and is visited by many tourists, especially during major festivals.

The castle and surrounding areas are sometimes used as a location to host foreign guests. The site of the palace is less than 10 km (6.2 mi) to the northwest of Qargha Dam.

== History ==
=== Construction ===
The preparation process began in March 2013. 700 people were employed for the project. According to officials, a total of $6.5 million was allocated from the budget of the Ministry of Finance for preparing the palace. The development effort had a huge impact on the economy of local communities. The construction work on the palace and its surroundings incurred more than US$15 million. Experts believed the international functions in Paghman can make the place a preferred tourist destination in Afghanistan.

The 2014 Nowruz was cancelled due to security reasons and all the celebrations took place at the Arg in Kabul. The government's reason for the move was that work on the castle was incomplete.

== Description ==
The officials say that the castle has three floors and is made of Afghan marble and wood from Kunar Province. Its interior is decorated with handmade carpets and includes security cameras and emergency rooms. Beside the palace, there is a venue for exhibitions of domestic products. The palace's surroundings also consist of thousands of newly planted trees as well as a Buzkashi field, a waterfall and other attractions. The palace's interior is decorated with traditional handmade Afghan carpets and other traditional material. A tree-lined boulevard leads to the palace.

== See also ==
- List of castles in Afghanistan
- Tourism in Afghanistan
