= Fort of Bost =

Fort in Bost, Afghanistan

- Archaeological site
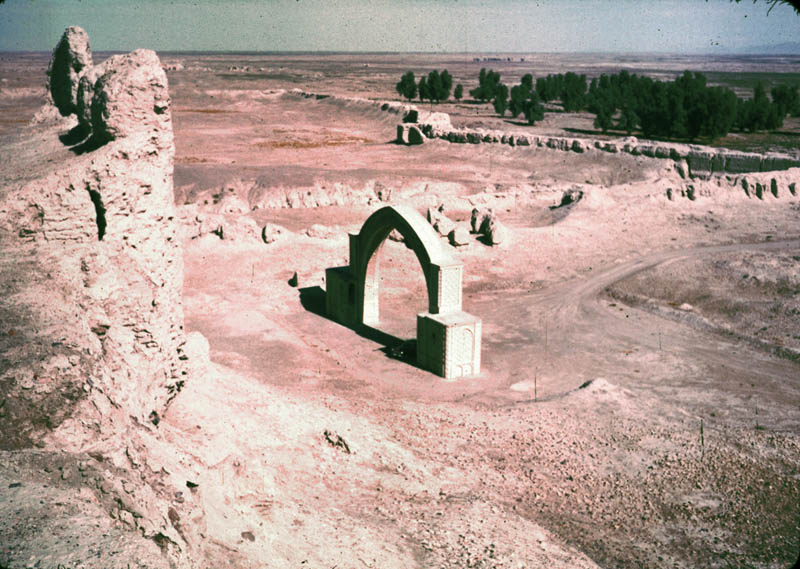
- Ghurid dynasty arch in Qala-e-Bost

- Location in Afghanistan
- Coordinates: 31°30′2″N 64°21′24″E
- Country: Afghanistan
- Province: Helmand
- District: Lashkargah

The Fort of Bost, locally referred to as Qala-e-Bost (Dari: قلعه بست; Pashto: بست کلا), is a fortification near Lashkargah in the Helmand Province of Afghanistan, which is believed by some to have been built approximately 3,000 years ago. It has been visited by many locals and foreign tourists throughout history. The archaeological site covers an area of around 10 kilometers (or 8 miles).

The Fort of Bost is located at 31° 30’ 02″ N, 64° 21’ 24″ E near the convergence of the Helmand and Arghandab rivers, about 6 miles south of Lashkargah. The site is famous for its 11th century decorative arch, which appears on the 100 afghani note (Afghan currency). The arch is part of the remains of an ancient mosque. Those who visited the fortress described it as a thriving community, with many fresh fruit and date palm trees in the area.

== History ==
In 2006, construction began on a cobblestone road from the south of Lashkargah to the Qala-e-Bost Arch (known to readers of James A. Michener's Caravans as Qala Bist.) As of April 2008, it was possible to descend into an ancient shaft about 20 feet across and 200 feet deep, with a series of dark side rooms and a spiral staircase leading to the bottom. In 2020, restoration work started on the fort.

In 2021, it became home to hundreds of people who fled from Taliban clashes.

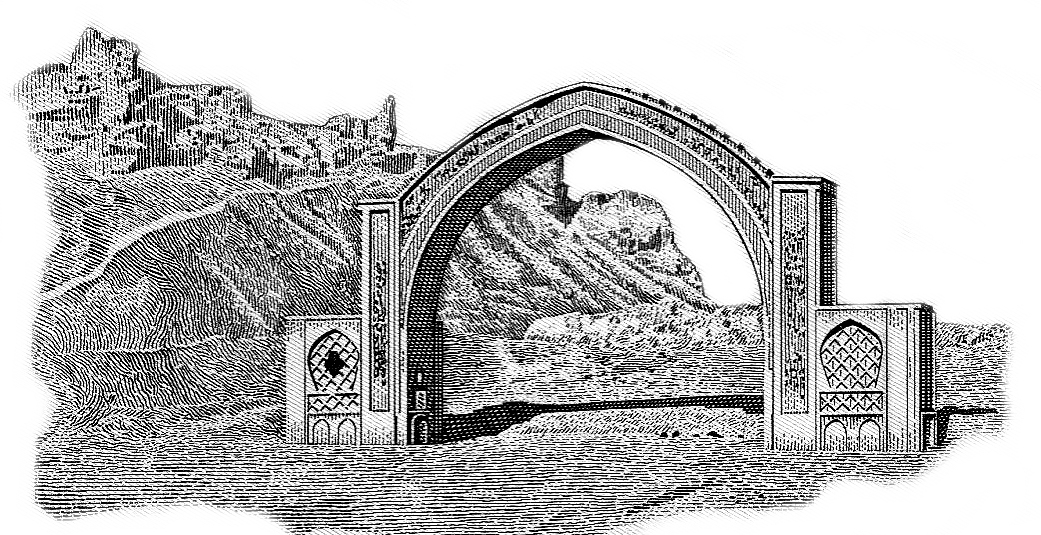
Fortress and arch of Qala-e-Bost as printed on Afghan banknote

== Architecture ==
All that stands of the Fort of Bost today is the 11th-century pointed arch, standing at 25 meters high. It is built with baked carved bricks, a type of ornamentation, decorated in geometric patterns and stucco insets. It included calligraphic inscriptions. The arch, Fort of Bost, belonged to an Iwan of a religious building. There are also ruins of an imposing fortress, mud brick walls of private houses from the Islamic Period. Fort of Bost is a monumental remanent that depicts how Islamic architecture was essential to their civilization.

== See also ==
- List of castles in Afghanistan
- Tourism in Afghanistan
