= Paghman =

District in Kabul Province, Afghanistan

Coordinates: 34°35′N 68°57′E

Paghman پغمان
- Town
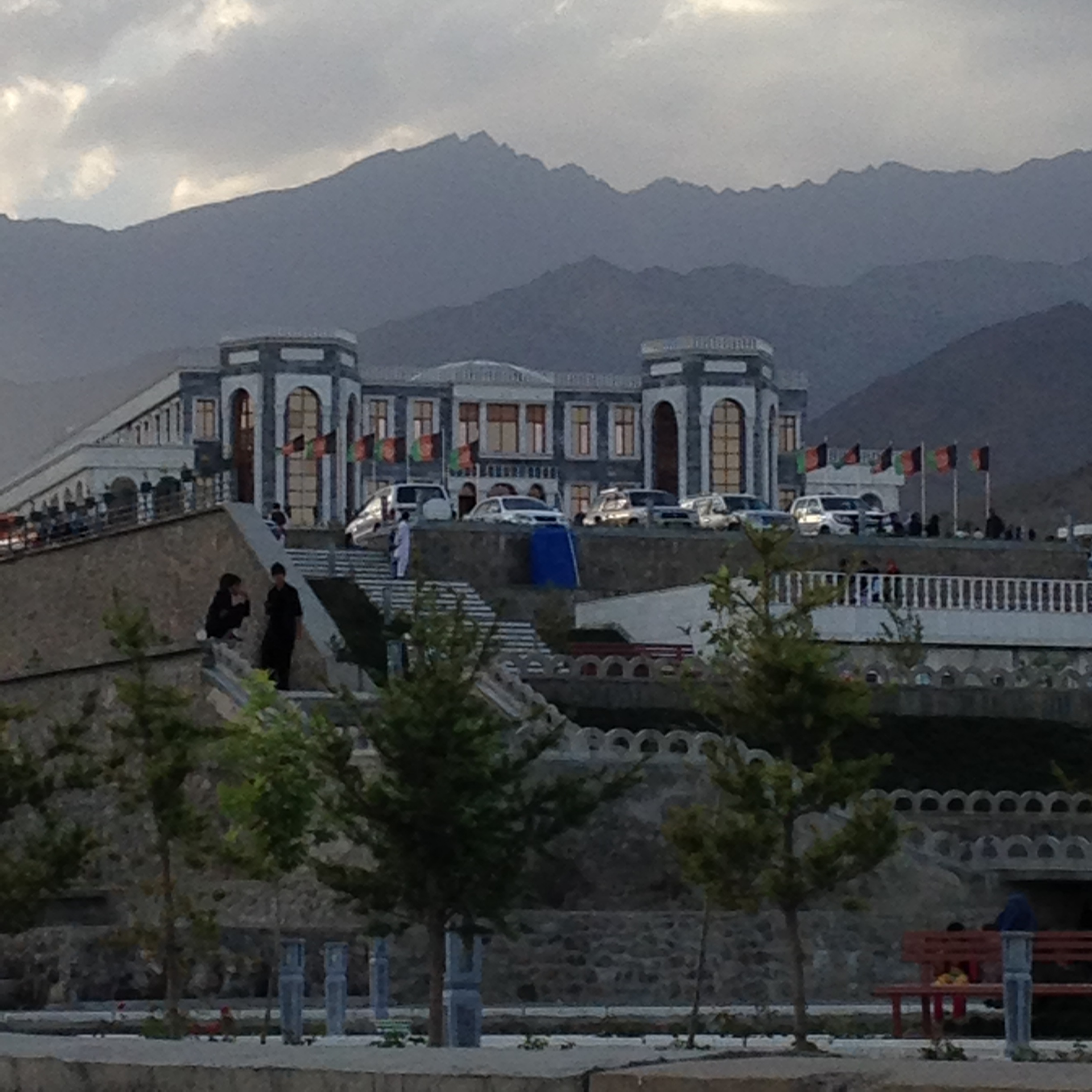
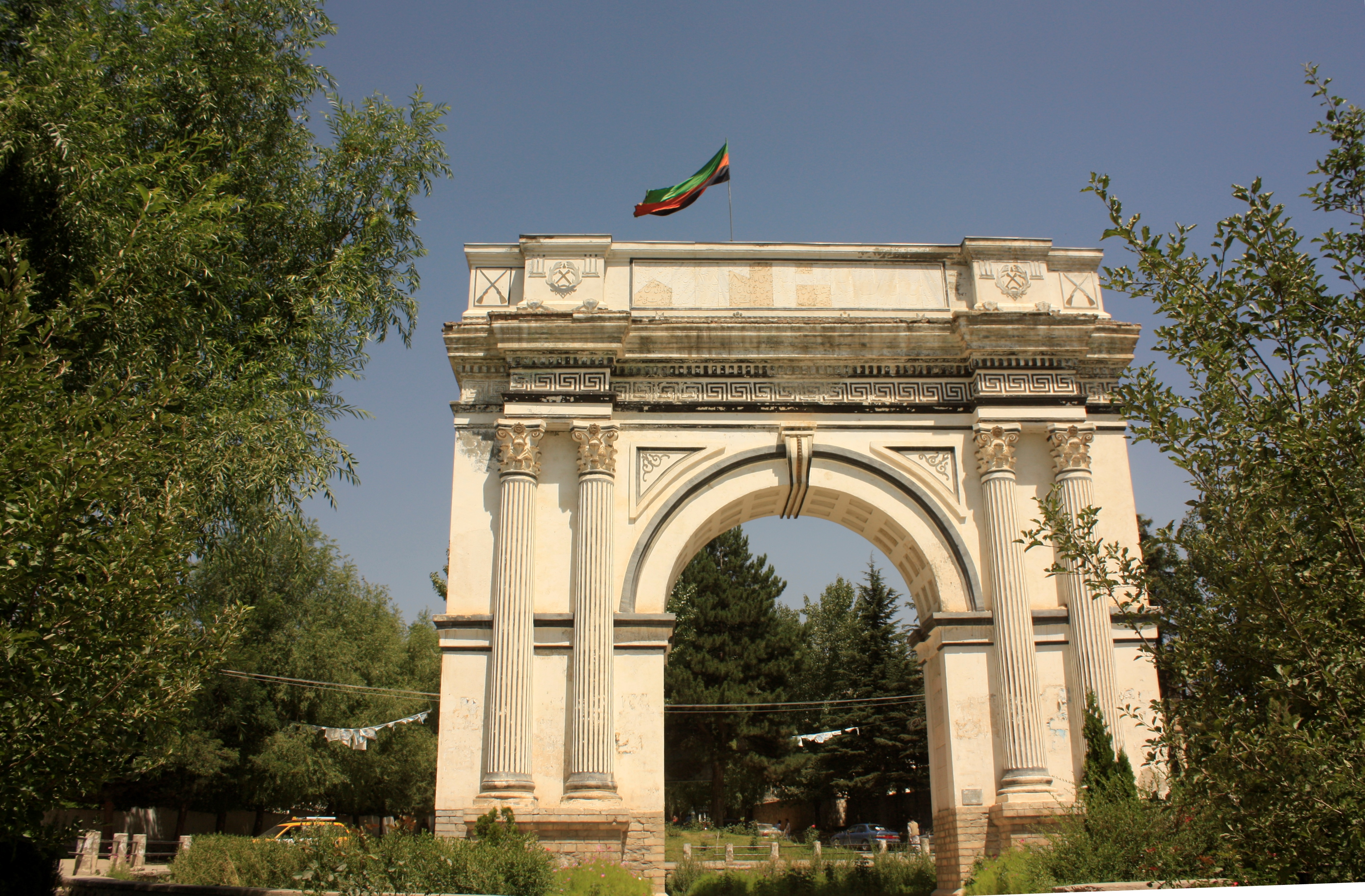
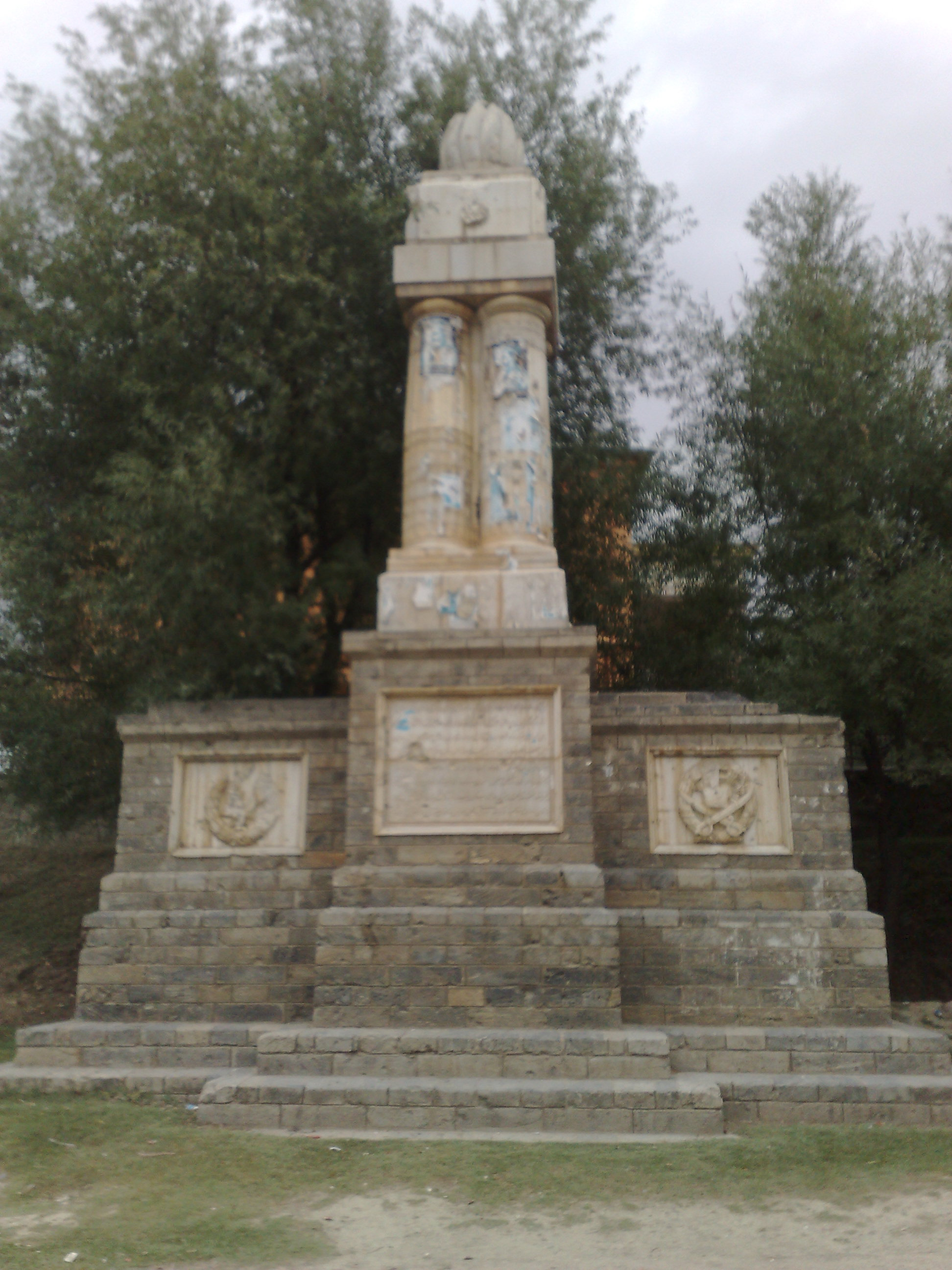
- Clockwise from top: Paghman Hill Castle in 2014; a monument; Taq-e Zafar

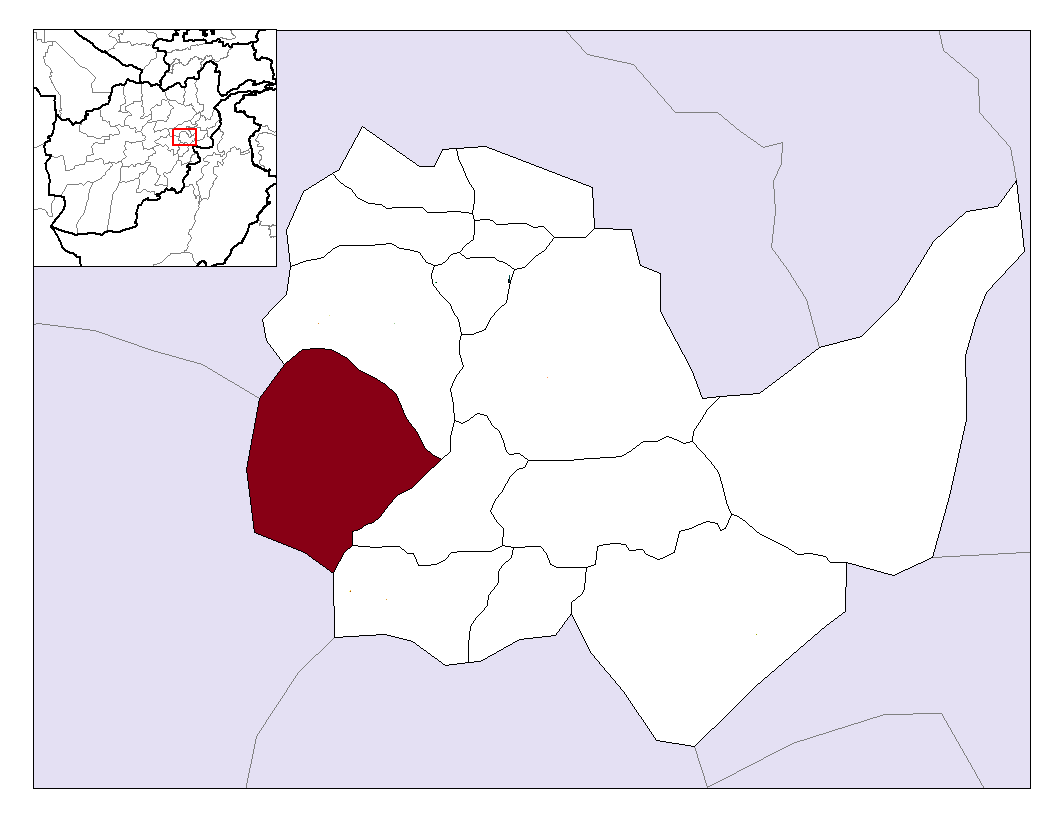
- Location in Kabul Province
- Country: Afghanistan
- Province: Kabul
- District: Paghman

Area
  - Total: 600 km^{2} (230 sq mi)
- Elevation: 2,307 m (7,569 ft)

Population (2015)
  - Total: 143,000
  - Density: 240/km^{2} (620/sq mi)
- Time zone: UTC+04:30 (AFT)

Paghman (Pashto (Note: Pashto pronunciation: [paɣ.mɑn]); Dari (Note: Dari pronunciation: [pʰäɣ.mɑːn]): پغمان) is a town in the hills near Afghanistan's capital of Kabul. It is the seat of the Paghman District (in the western part of Kabul Province) which has a population of about 120,000 (2002 official UNHCR est.), mainly Pashtuns and Tajiks. The gardens of Paghman are a major tourist attraction, and the reason for the city being known as the garden capital of Afghanistan. The neighboring town of Qargha is to the southeast, which can be reached by several roads.

== History ==
=== 20th century ===
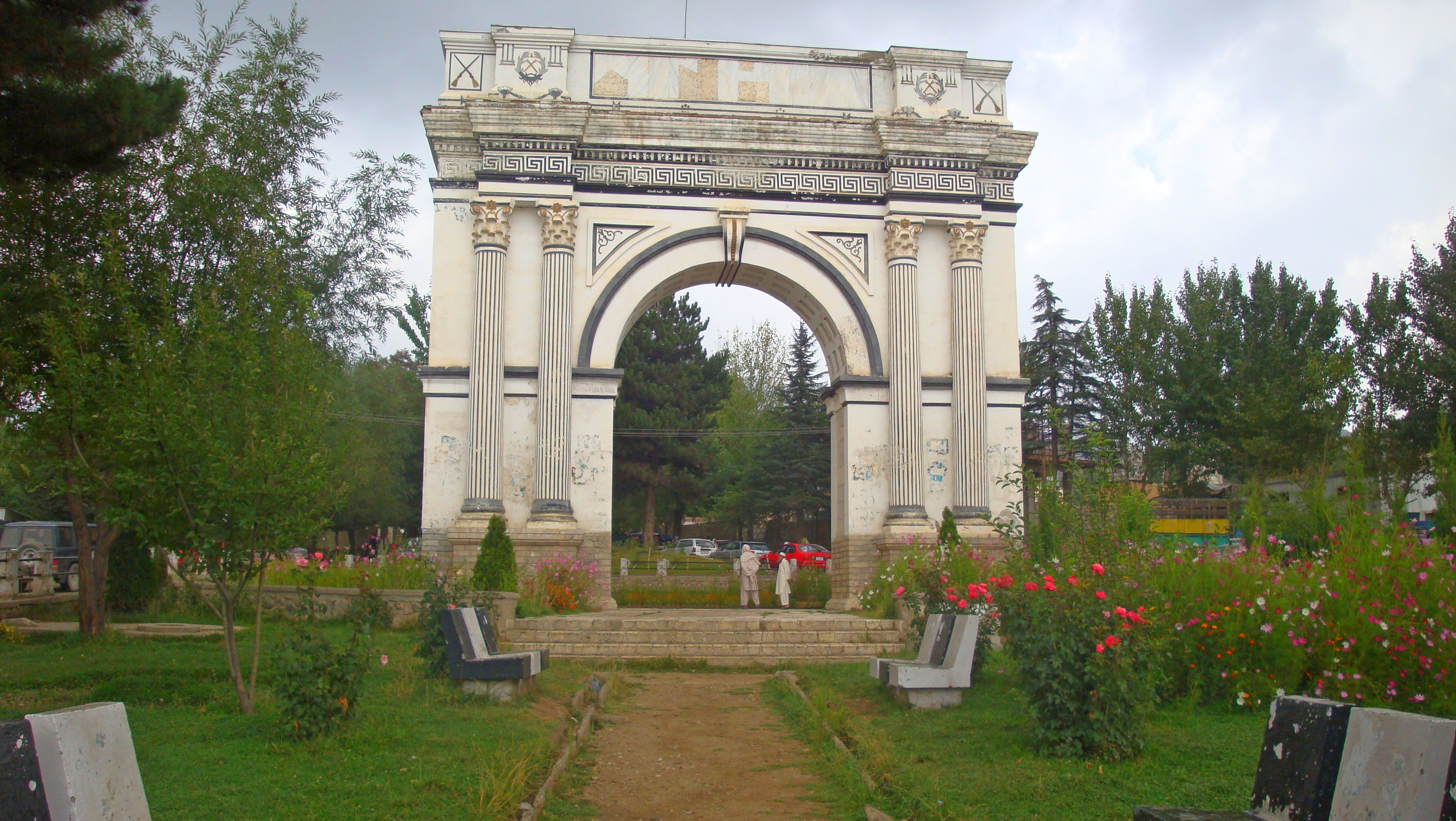
Taq-e Zafar

After King Amanullah Khan and Queen Soraya Tarzi's return from Europe in 1928, Amanullah brought in foreign experts to redesign Kabul. At that time, at the entrance of Paghman, they created a European-style monumental gate similar to but smaller than the Arc de Triomphe in Paris, France, which was similarly called the Taq-e Zafar (Persian: طاق ظفر Arch of Victory). Originally a small village at the bottom of the Hindu Kush, Paghman turned into a holiday retreat with villas and chalets as well as the summer capital. Its wide avenues contained fir, poplar and nut trees which flew past the arch, villas and a golf course. It was a popular place for the wealthy and the aristocrats to visit.

The new royal gardens were opened to the public under the proviso—as a matter of reform—that western dress was adopted there, as in the royal residential areas of nearby Kabul. On September 1, 1928, King Amanullah convoked the Loya Jirga to Paghman to the puzzlement of many delegates, who found themselves at odds with the dress-code. On September 7, 1928, the Hazrat of Shor Bazaar—an influential political figure in Kabul—presented the king with a petition signed by some 400 religious leaders opposing many of Amanullah's reforms. This action led to the arrest of the Hazrat, the execution of some of his followers and finally the rebellion of 1929 led by Ameer Habibullah Kalakani, that overthrew the king.

The gardens eventually became a popular place for local and foreign tourists. Wealthy Kabulites owned summer homes there who employed servants and maids.

During the Soviet–Afghan War in the 1980s, Paghman was a major battleground and suffered from bombardment from both the Soviet-backed government and the mujahideen rebels. Most buildings were destroyed and residents had fled. Little remained of the prosperous Gardens, save for the remains of the Arc de Triomphe style arch, which has had its top blown off.

=== 21st century ===
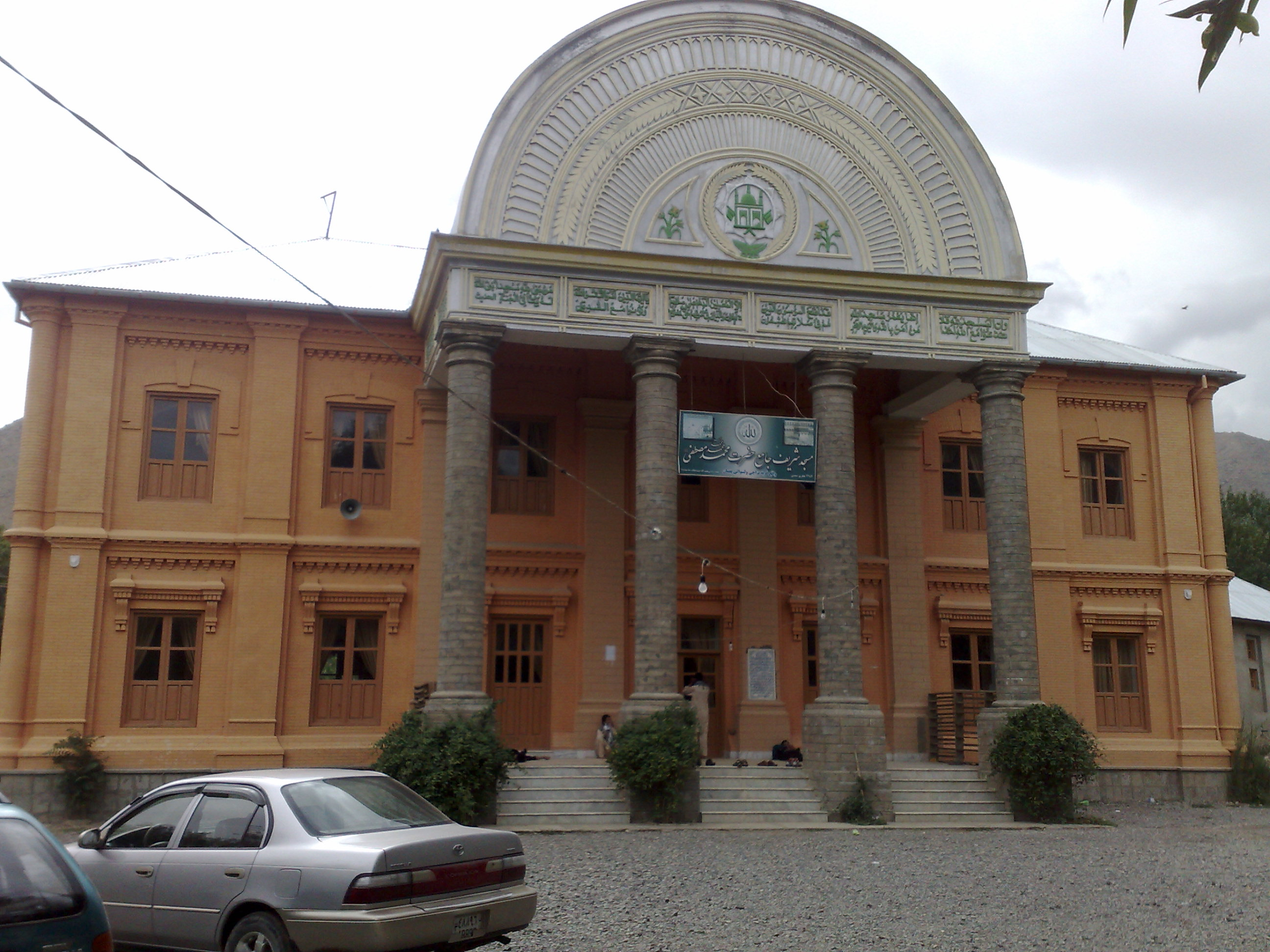
The European style main mosque in Paghman

Following the formation of the Karzai administration, the Arch was reconstructed and was completed by May 2005. Other damaged parts of the former Gardens were also rebuilt. It once again became a popular touristic site, and is popular with residents of Kabul. There was further development in the 2010s.

In 2012, 1,000 families in the Paghman district received electricity. The power was distributed to families in the Pracha village of Pashaee valley after the installation of three 1,000 kilovolt transformers. The electricity was supplied to people from the Mahipar Dam in the Surobi district at the cost of 35 million AFN (US$622,443).

In 2014, a newly built palace, the Paghman Hill Castle, was opened to the public. The palace's surroundings also consists of thousands of newly planted trees as well as a Buzkashi field, a waterfall and other attractions. The palace's interior is decorated with traditional handmade Afghan carpets and other traditional material. It was planned to be used for major festivals.

== Geography ==
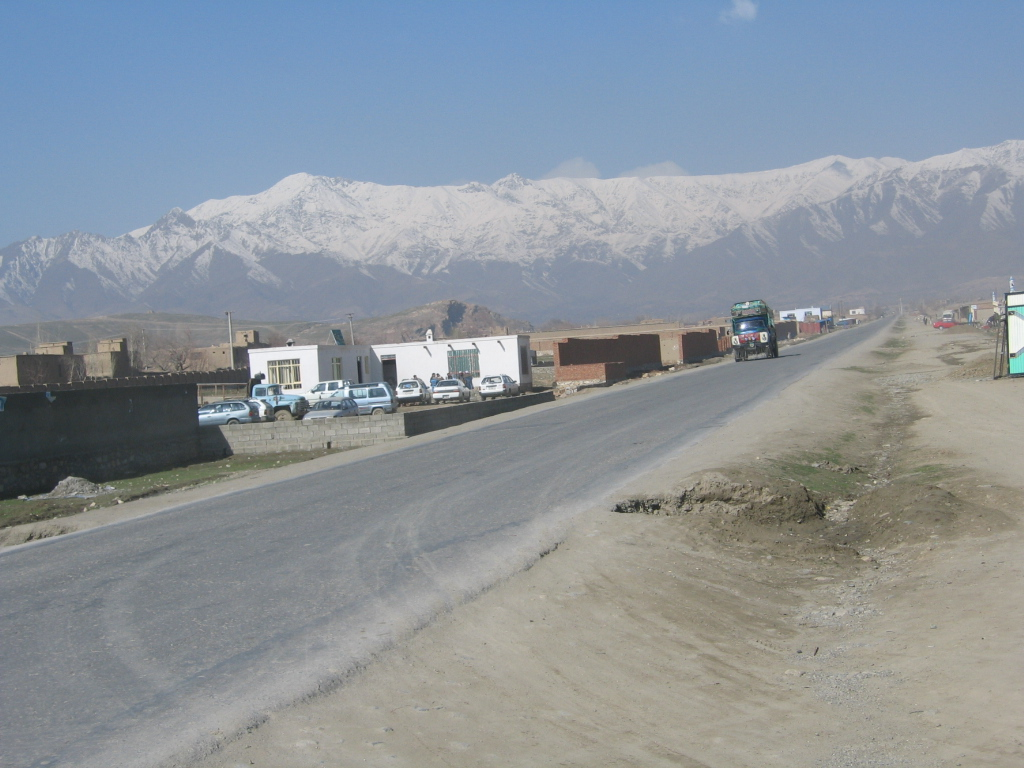
A road in Paghman, 2006

The Paghman area is greener compared to many other parts of the region, and also has fruit trees. It is located at the foot of the Hindu Kush mountain range. The Afghanodon salamander is endemic to Paghman.

The Kabul River, the only large river in the Kabul province, is fed by springs and snow-melt runoffs from Paghman. There is also a canal system, in need of repair, which extends from Paghman to Tapa.

There are several villages in the district, including Khaldari, Bektoot, Adam Khel Kala, Hatam Kala, Seeno Kala, Mullah Khel Kala, Muhabbat Khan Kala, Lachi Khel Kala, and Pajakk Tappa.

=== Climate ===
Paghman has a humid continental climate (Köppen climate classification Dsb). The average temperature for the year in Paghman is 9.1 °C (48.4 °F). The warmest month on average, is July with an average temperature of 21.0 °C (69.8 °F). The coolest month on average is January, with an average temperature of −5.3 °C (22.5 °F).

Climate data for Paghman, Kabul
Month	Jan	Feb	Mar	Apr	May	Jun	Jul	Aug	Sep	Oct	Nov	Dec	Year
Daily mean °C (°F)	−5.3 (22.5)	−5.3 (22.5)	4.9 (40.8)	10.7 (51.3)	12.2 (54.0)	19.5 (67.1)	21.0 (69.8)	20.2 (68.4)	17.4 (63.3)	10.1 (50.2)	4.8 (40.6)	−1.6 (29.1)	9.1 (48.3)
Average precipitation mm (inches)	44 (1.7)	57 (2.2)	130 (5.1)	89 (3.5)	30 (1.2)	0 (0)	11 (0.4)	0 (0)	0 (0)	18 (0.7)	43 (1.7)	52 (2.0)	474 (18.5)
Source: Levoyageur

== Economy ==
Agriculture, labour work, animal husbandry and employment in Kabul are the major sources of income.

== Notable natives ==
The locality was traditionally the family seat of the Paghman saadat most noted for its famous descendant Idries Shah.

Prominent Paghman natives include some leaders of Loya Jirgas, tribal chiefs, a president, and one king.

- King Amanullah Khan - Known as a reformist, Amanullah Khan ruled Afghanistan from 1919 to 1929.
- PDPA General Secretary Hafizullah Amin - Hafizullah Amin was the second leader of People's Democratic Party of Afghanistan (PDPA), after he murdered Nur Muhammad Taraki during the period of the communist Democratic Republic of Afghanistan.
- Sayed Omer Muneeb, Minister of Higher Education between 1992 and 1996. He was a lecturer at Kabul University and also served as a member of the Supreme Court of Afghanistan.

== Sister cities ==
- Alice Springs, Australia, since January 2005 after joining Sister Cities International.

== Gallery ==
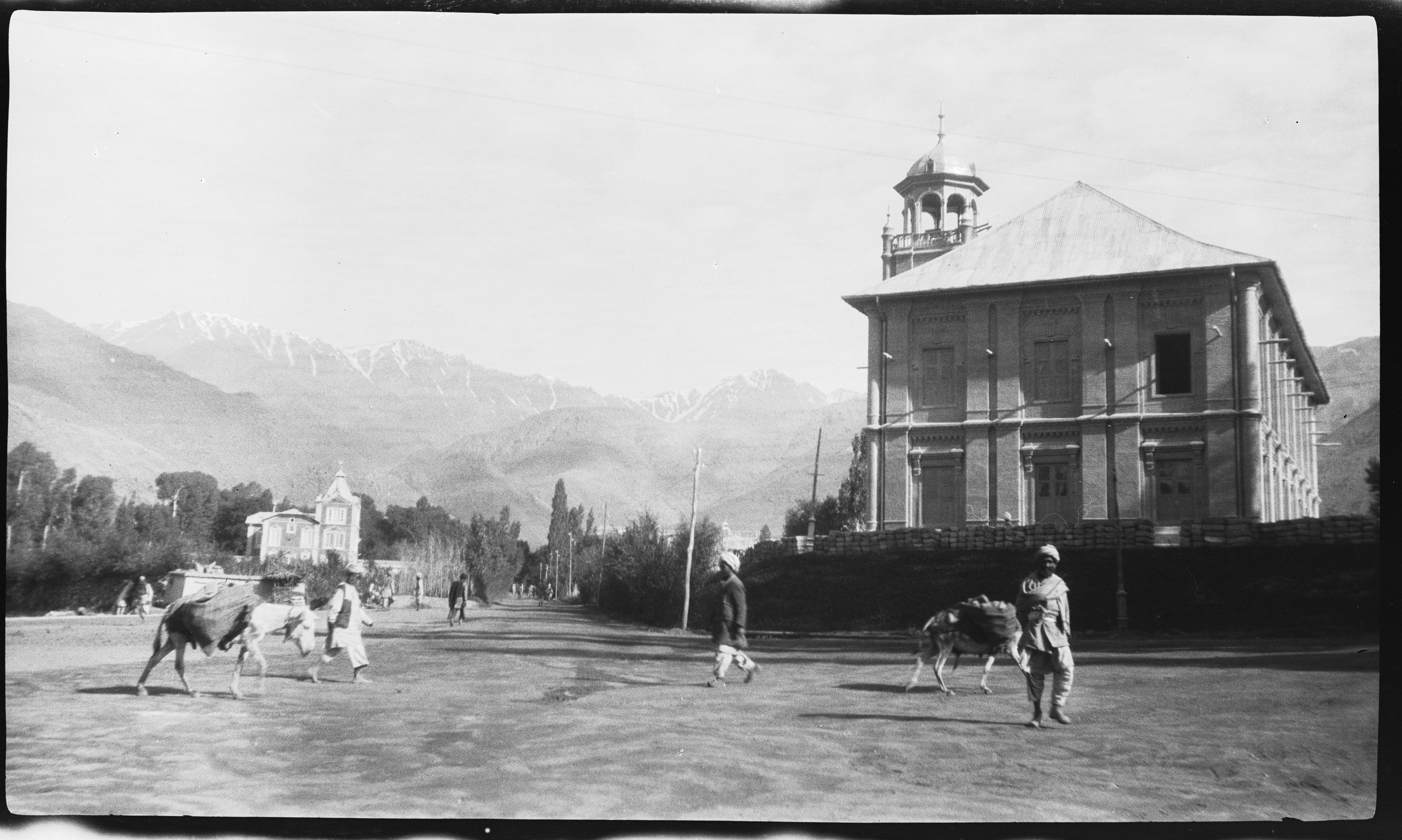
Mosque in Paghman, 1924

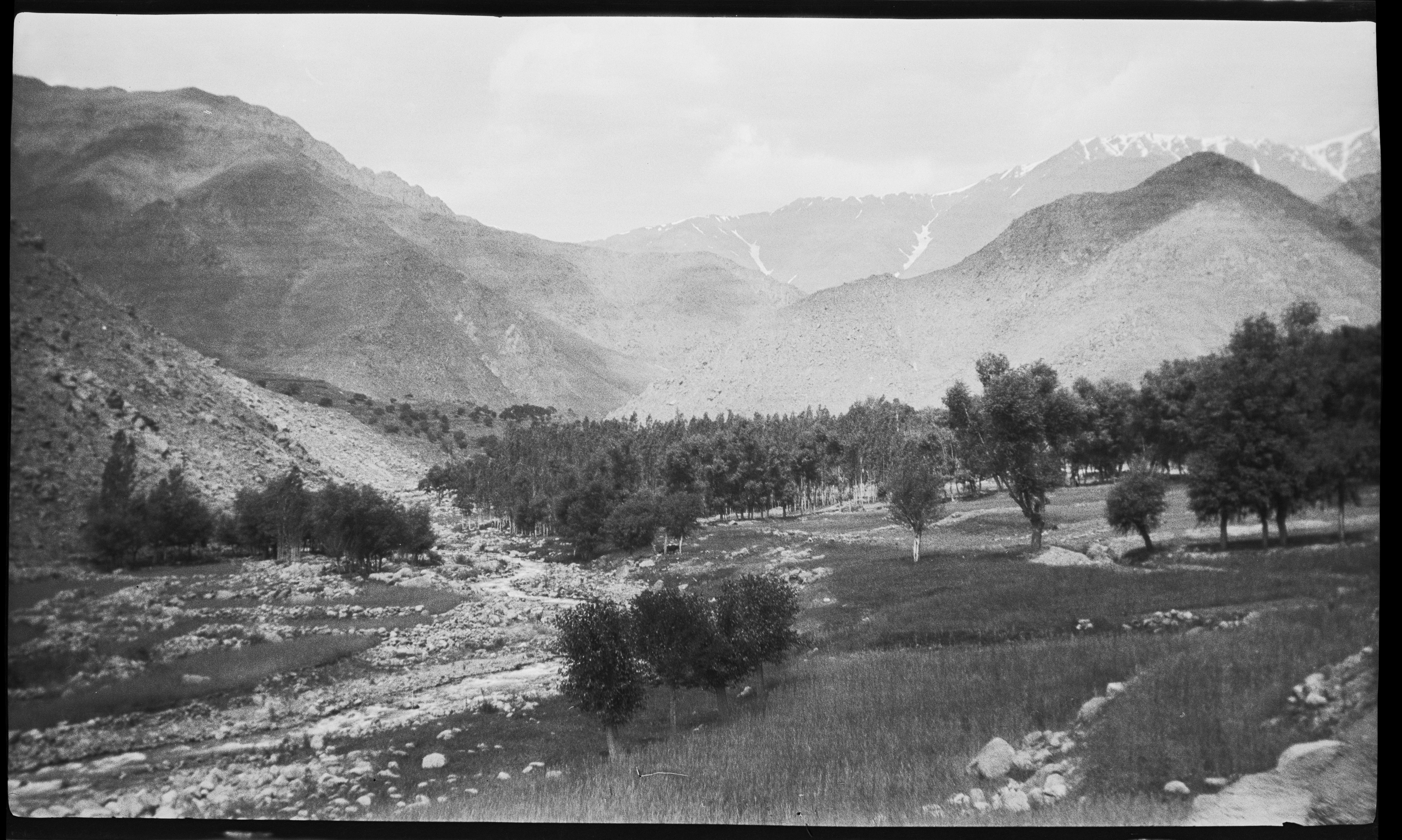
The valley beyond Paghman, 1924

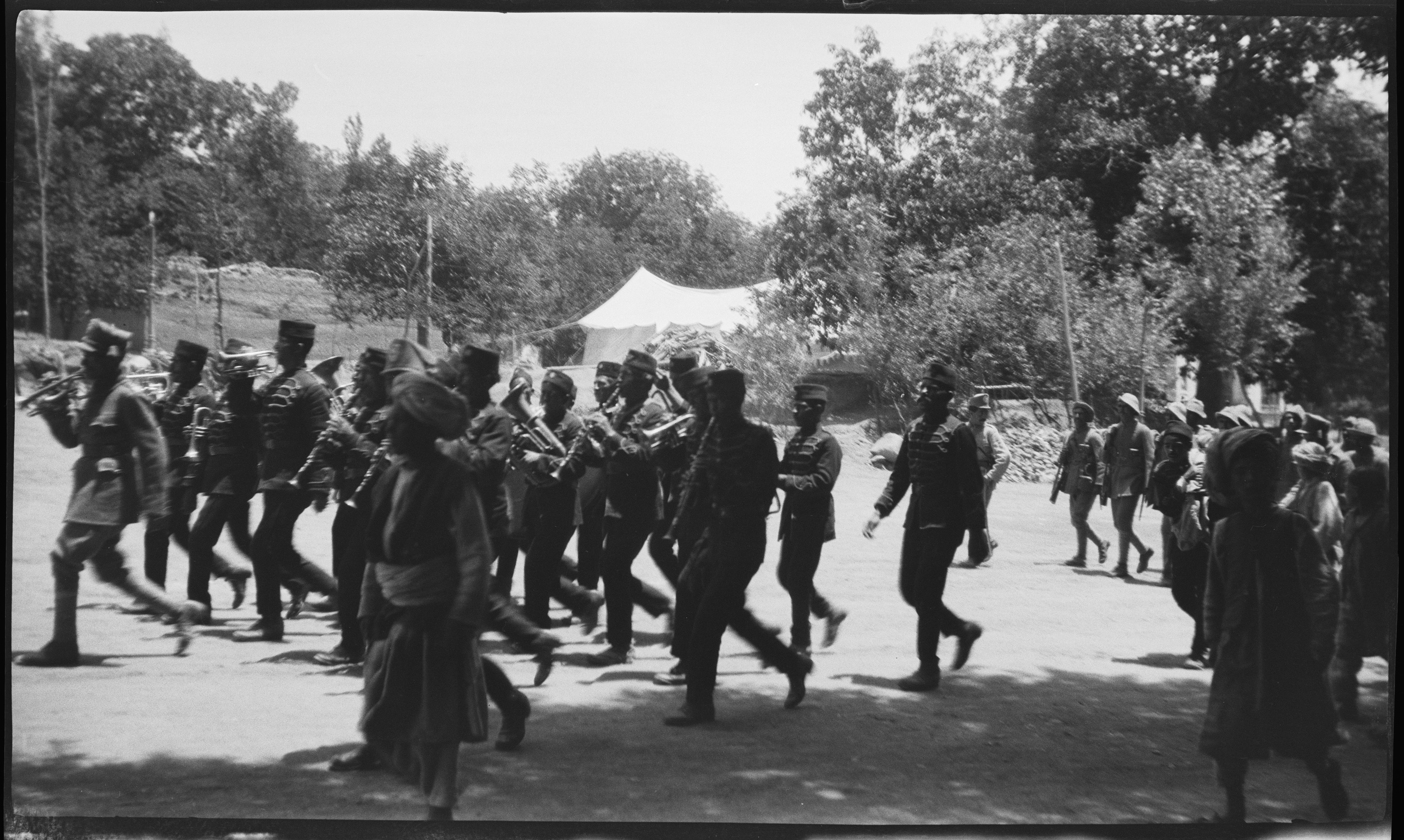
A brass band in Paghman, 1924

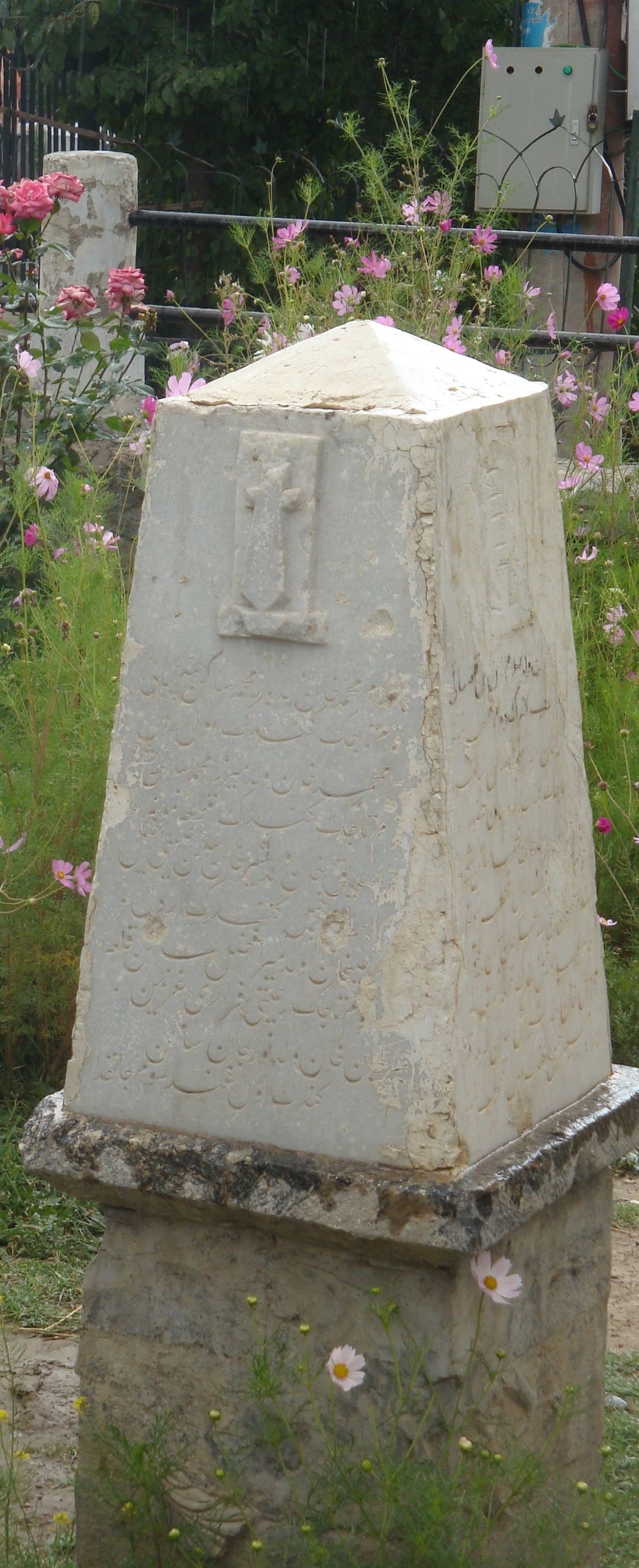
A stone in one of the gardens

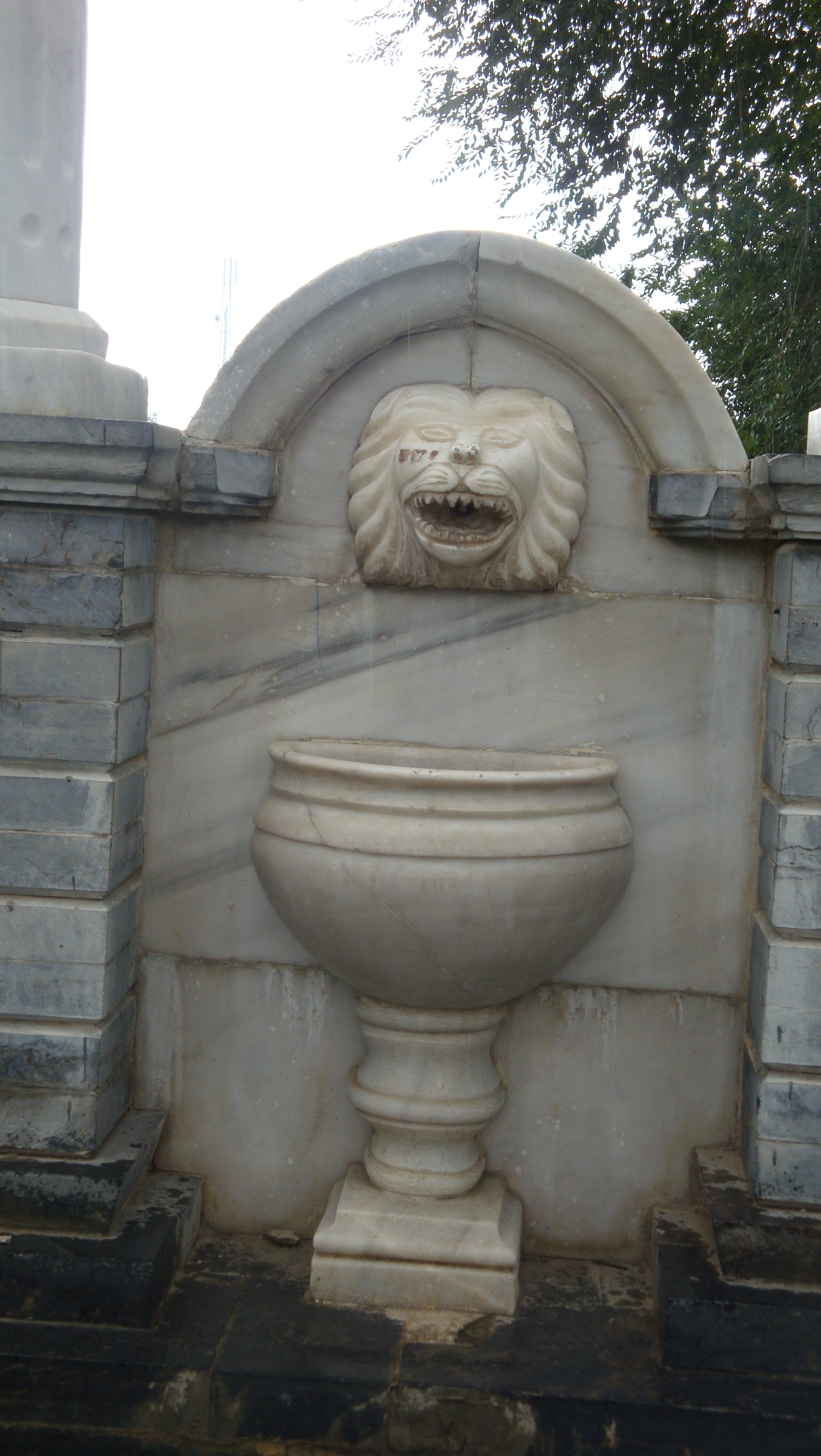
A fountain in one of the gardens

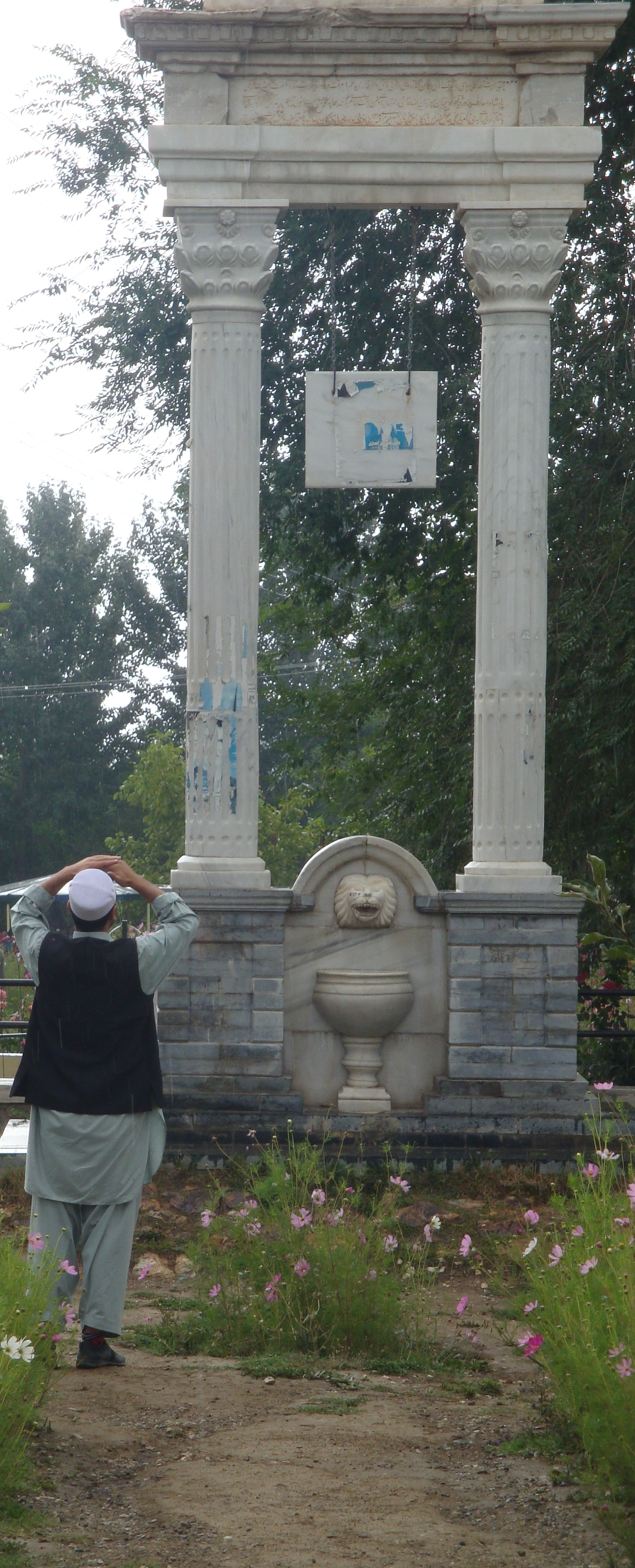
Monument

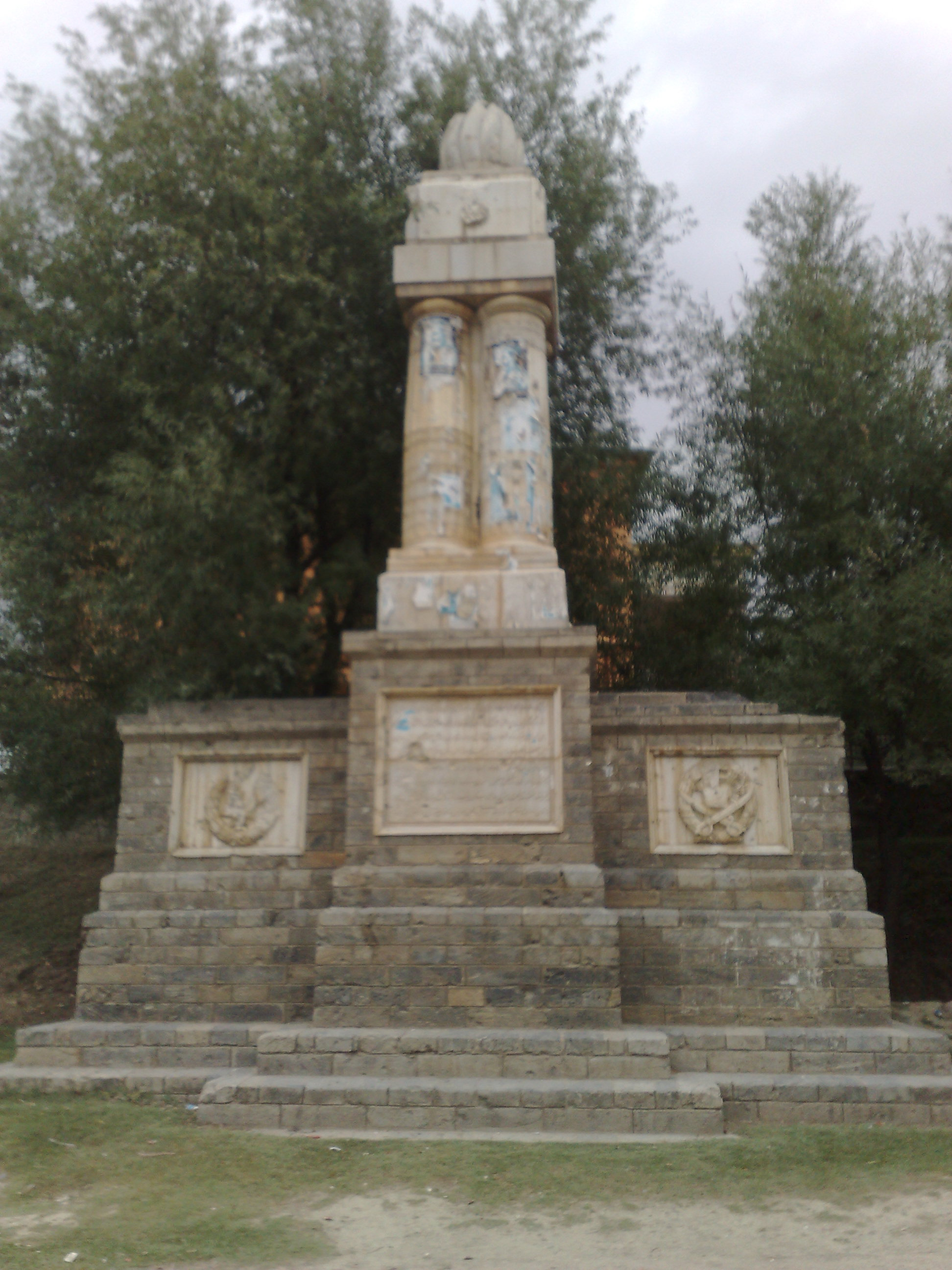
Monument

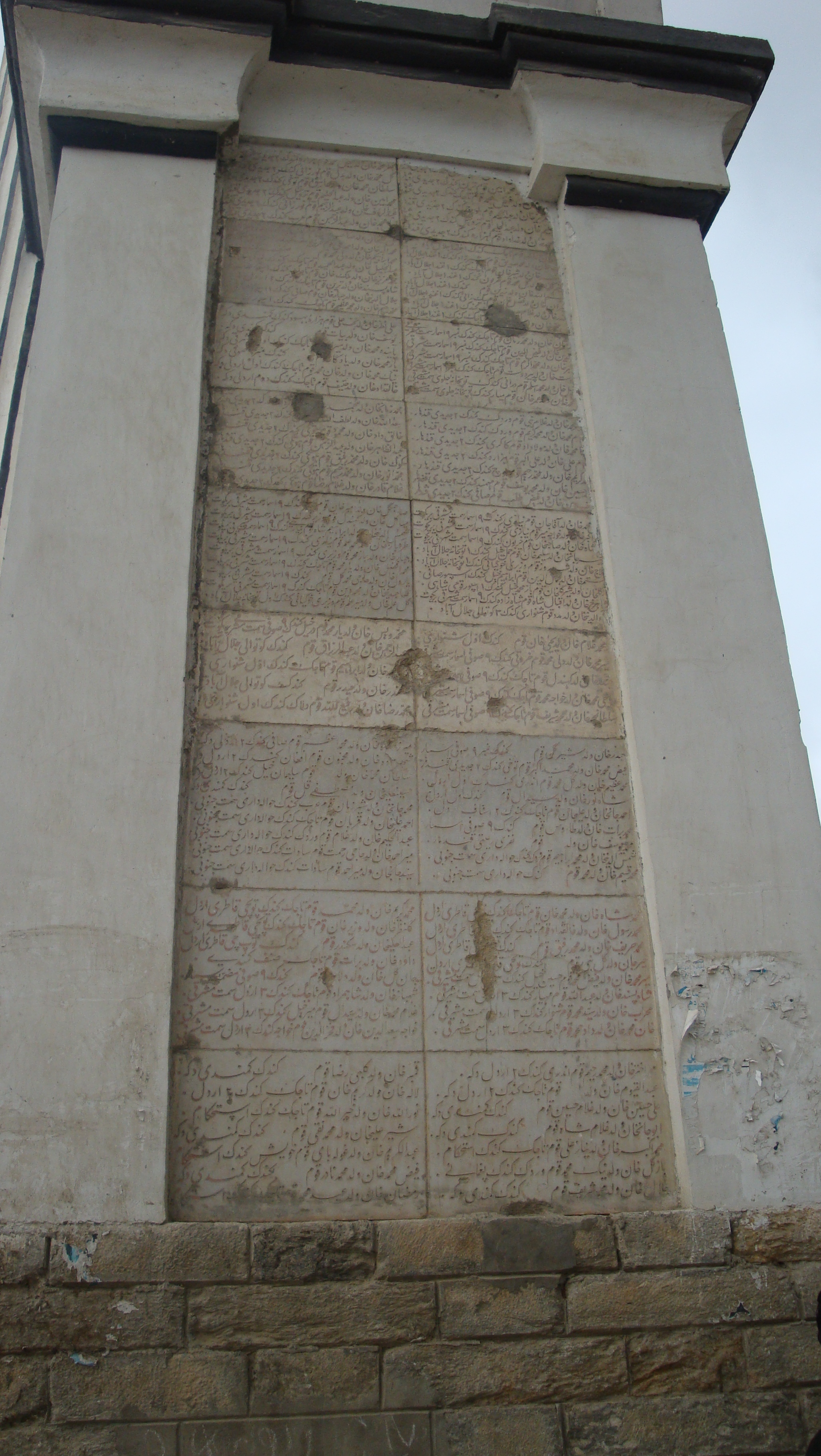
The wall of the Victory Arch

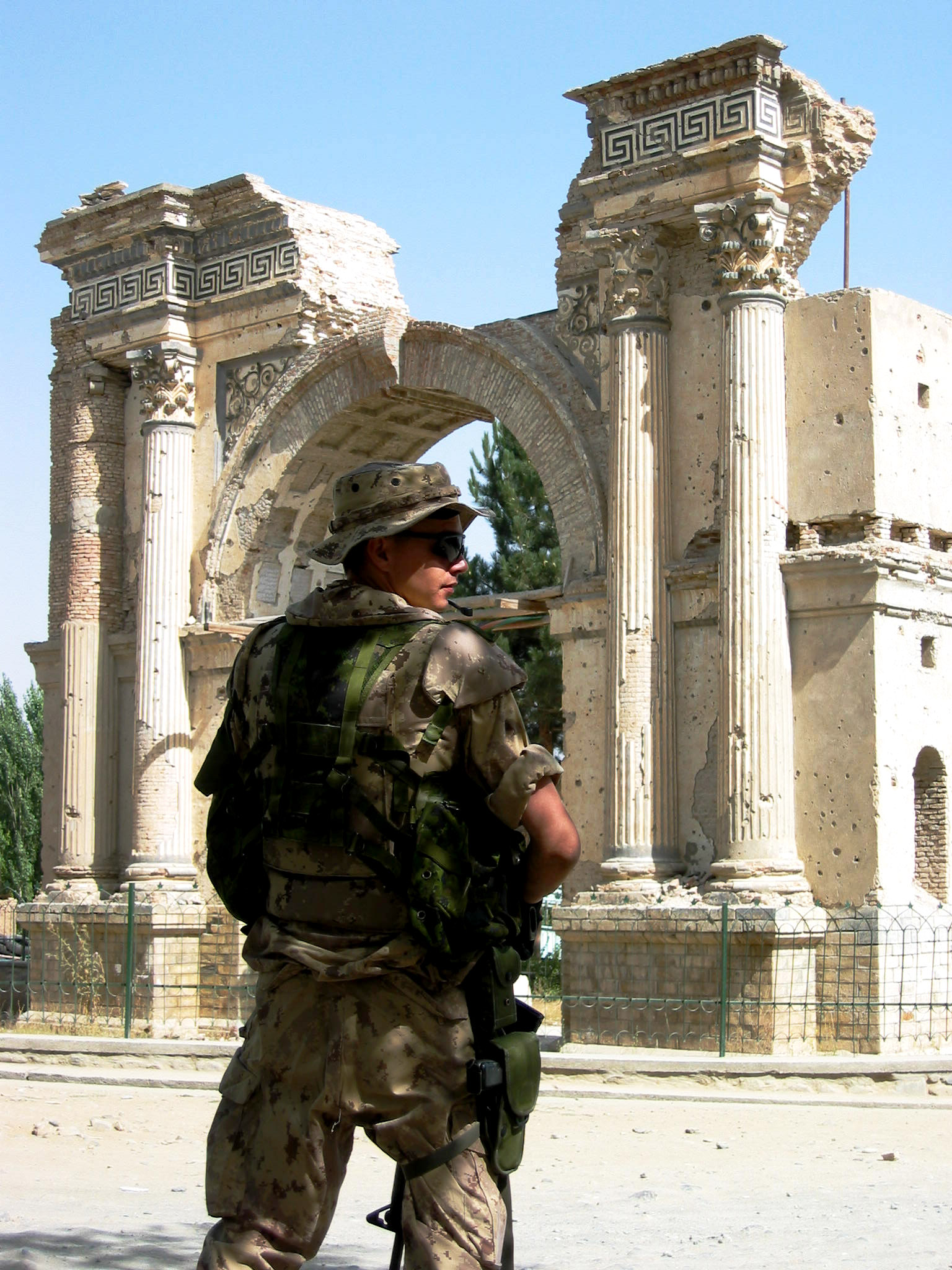
An ISAF soldier standing by the ruins of the Victory Arch in 2004, before its renovation

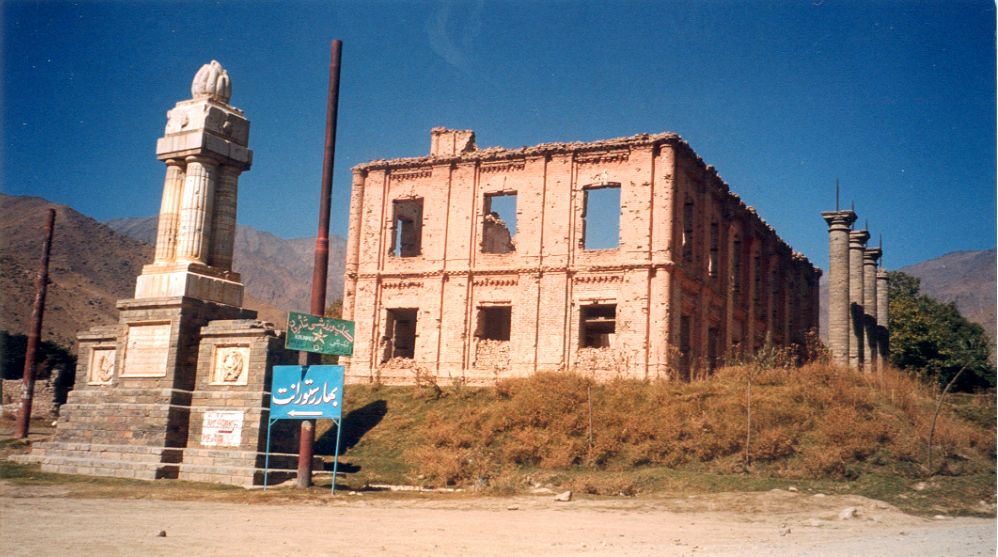
The historic mosque and memorandum after being destroyed by the war

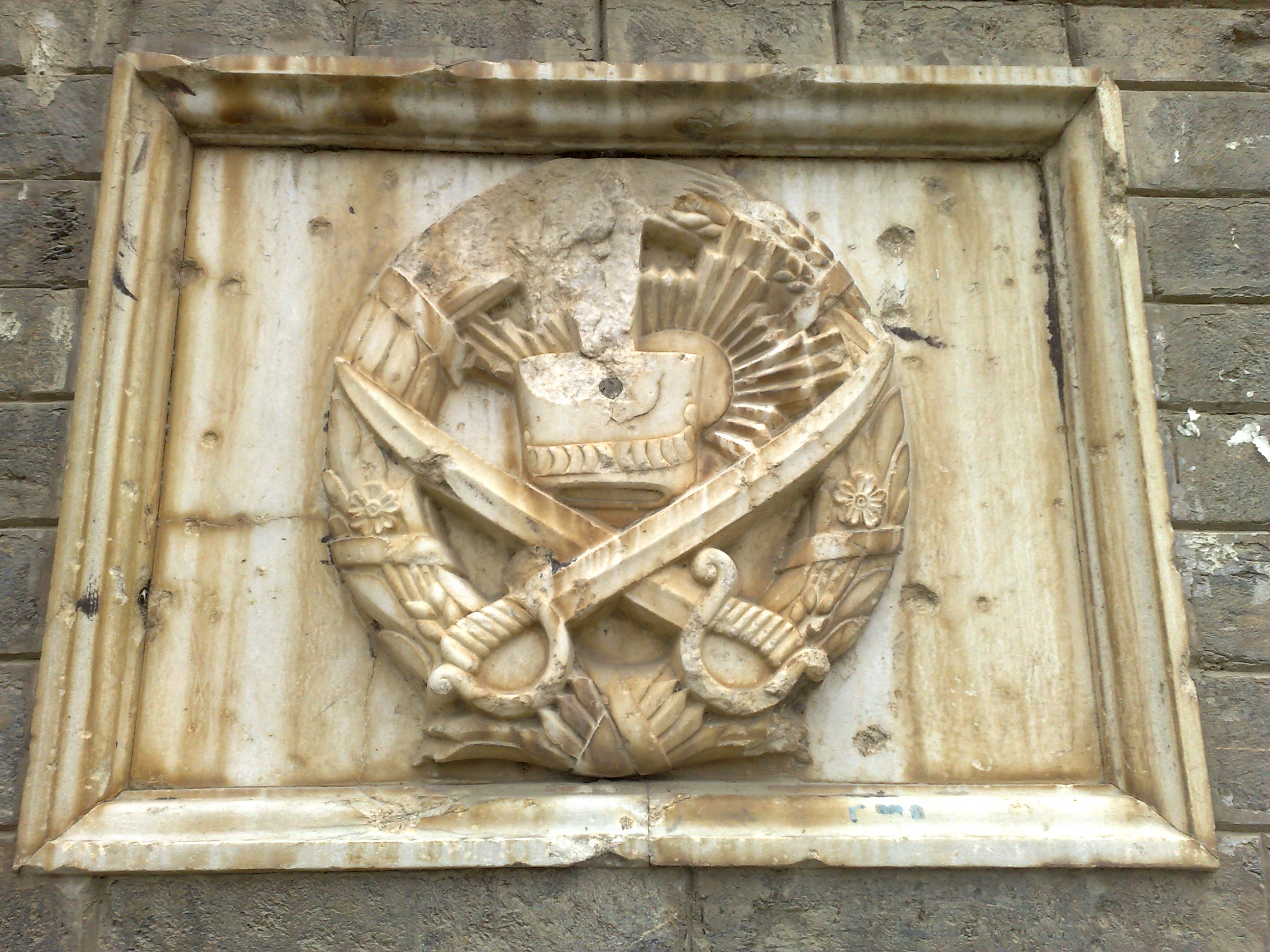
Emblem of King Amanullah Khan

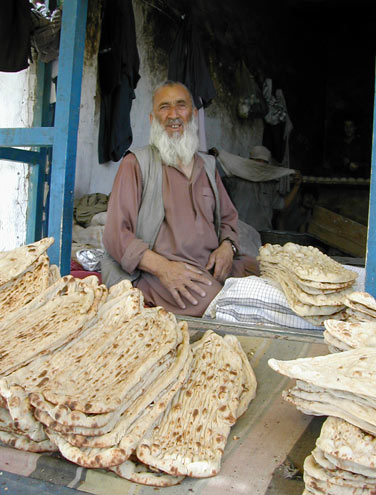
Localler selling Afghan bread in the market

== See also ==
- Tourism in Afghanistan
