= Tourism in Afghanistan =

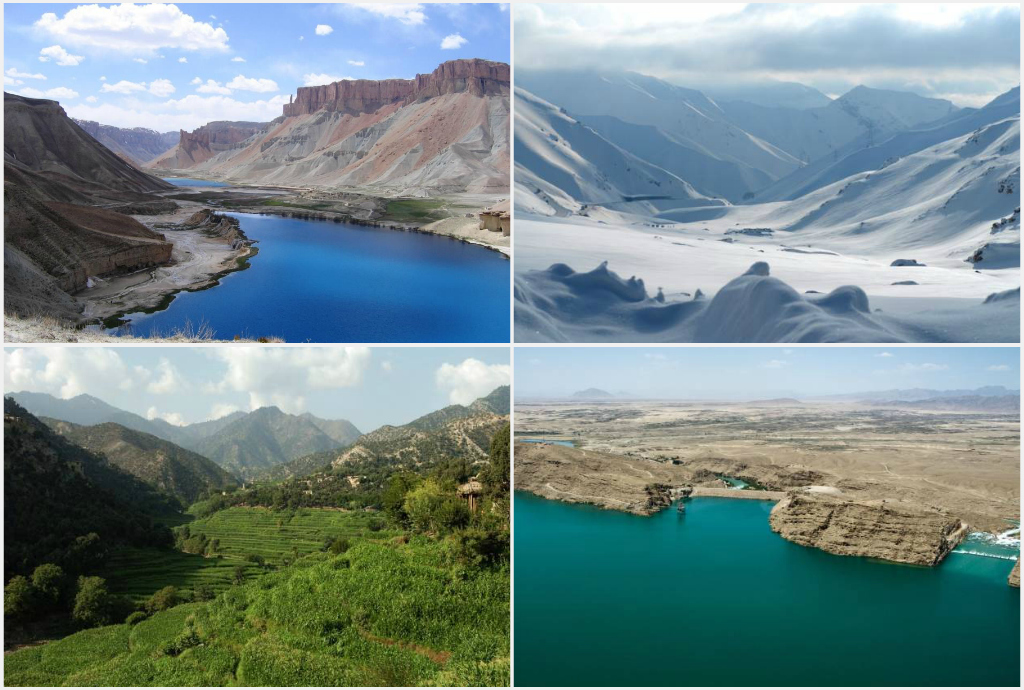
Some popular landscapes of Afghanistan, from left to right: 1. Band-e Amir National Park; 2. Salang Pass in Parwan Province; 3. Korangal Valley in Kunar Province; and 4. Kajaki Dam in the valley of Helmand Province

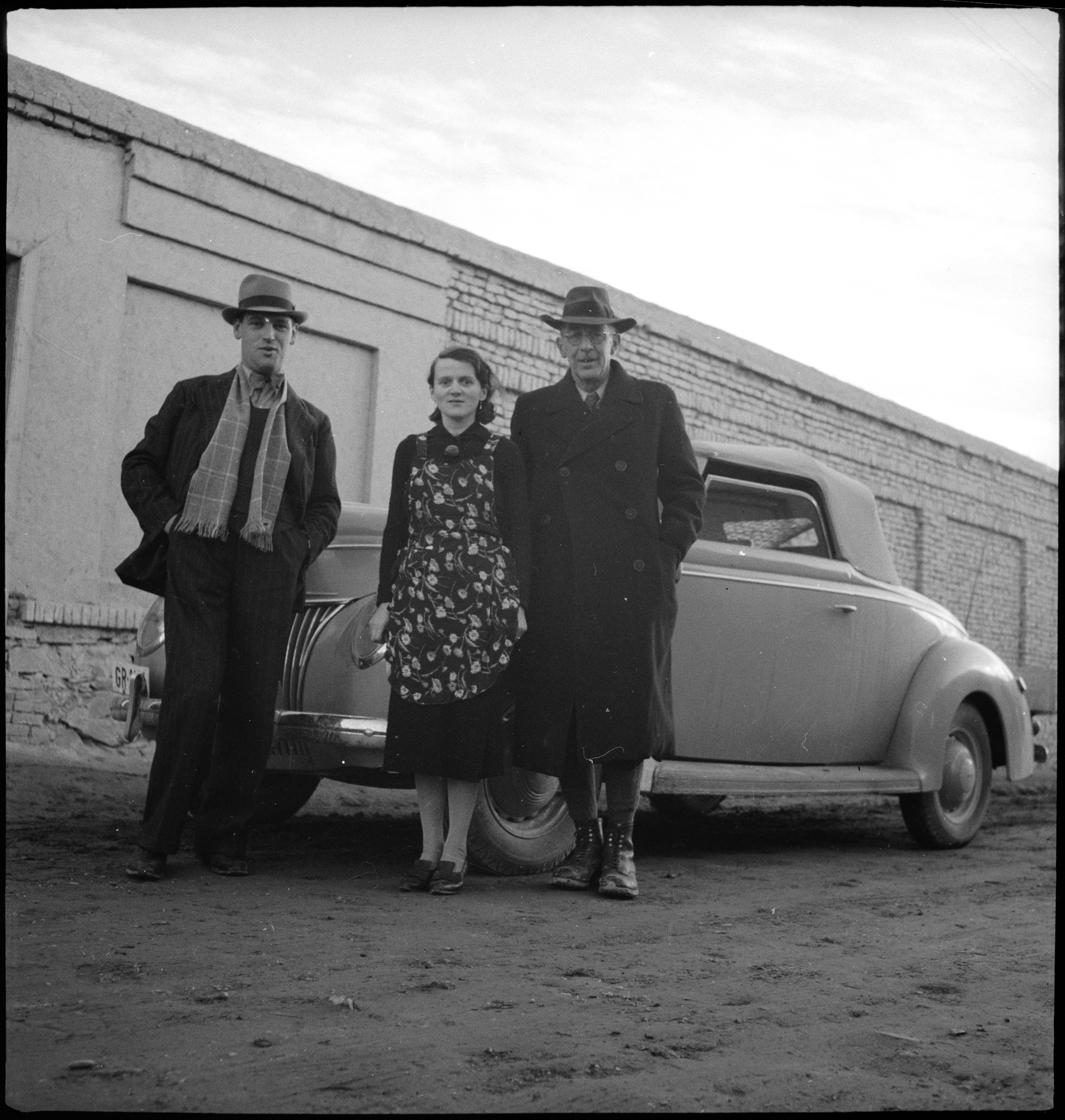
Foreign tourists in Kabul, c. 1940

Tourism in Afghanistan is regulated by the Ministry of Information and Culture.

As of 2022, there are at least 350 tourism companies operating in Afghanistan.

Afghanistan was a stop along the Hippie trail from the mid-1950s to the late 1970s. Tourism to Afghanistan was at its peak before the 1978 Saur Revolution, which was followed by the decades of warfare. Between 2013 and 2016, Afghan embassies issued between 15,000 and 20,000 tourist visas annually. In 2014, bookings for adventure trips were doubled in Afghanistan. Following Taliban's return to power in August 2021, visitor numbers gradually increased from 691 in 2021 to 2,300 in 2022, reaching 7,000 in 2023.

== Infrastructure for Tourism ==
Afghanistan has four international airports, which include Kabul International Airport, Mazar-i-Sharif International Airport, the Ahmad Shah Baba International Airport in Kandahar, and Herat International Airport. It also has a number of smaller domestic airports such as Bamyan Airport, Bost Airport, Chaghcharan Airport, Farah Airport, Fayzabad Airport, Ghazni Airport, Jalalabad Airport, Khost Airport, Kunduz Airport, Maymana Airport, Nili Airport, Tarinkot Airport, and Zaranj Airport.

Guest houses and hotels are found in every city of Afghanistan. Some of the major hotels in Kabul are the Serena Hotel, the Hotel Inter-Continental Kabul, and the Safi Landmark Hotel.

Visas to visit Afghanistan are expensive and difficult to obtain and many embassies have shut or suspended their operations. Foreign tourists must obtain written permission from the Taliban to visit tourist spots and take photos or videos of their interactions with Afghans and Taliban fighters. Anyone the Taliban considers or suspects as a foreign journalists or rights activists are barred from entering and working in the country.

== Culture and security issues ==
Afghanistan is an Islamic country where alcohol and drugs are prohibited. In Islam, a tourist or a traveler is called a musafir. Such person is treated as a diplomat and protected under Afghan culture. Every mosque is a place of ultimate protection against those wanting to cause harm. Although Afghans are generally friendly to tourists or travelers, kidnapping for ransom still exists in the country. Several foreign tourists have been kidnapped and killed in Afghanistan in the past.

In June 2022, Taliban spokesman Zabiullah Mujahid said that "anyone" can visit Afghanistan for tourism, and the Ministry of Information and Culture started promoting it while claiming that Afghanistan is now safe. This, however, does not mean that unexploded ordnances or land mines no longer exist because they likely still do.

== Ethics of Foreigner Tourist Visiting Afghanistan ==
Following the Taliban resurgence in 2021, Afghanistan witnessed an unexpected boom in tourism. Early in 2025, Deputy Minister of Tourism Qudratullah Jamal said almost 9,000 foreign tourists came to the country in 2024, while 3,000 visited in the first three months of 2025.

Foreign visitors to Afghanistan since the retaking by the Taliban often consider themselves engaged in danger tourism or war tourism, a niche in the tourism industry involving travel to dangerous places, often active or former war zones.

Visiting Afghanistan as a tourist is not without controversy. "What might feel like an adventurous trip to an underexplored country can turn out to be an unintentional investment in the oppression of the Afghan people." Tahera Nassrat, founder and chief executive of the Afghan Peace Foundation, said "Travelling to Afghanistan under the current regime risks normalising and legitimising a government that has been widely condemned for its ongoing human rights abuses. And the idea that it's somehow a 'safe' place for tourism, especially for outsiders, is simply not accurate."

Some foreign tourists have been arrested by the Taliban while visiting, the most famous being Miles Routledge, an English YouTuber, who departed for a third holiday to Afghanistan in late February 2023 and was apprehended by the Taliban on 2 March 2023.

== Badakhshan ==
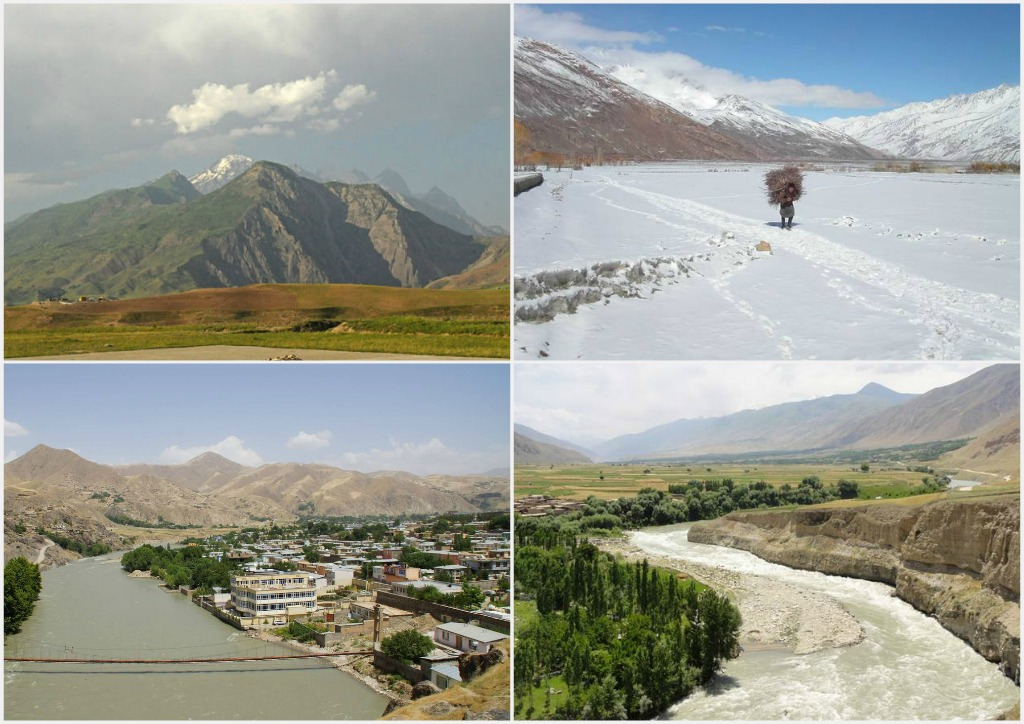
Badakhshan Province

Fayzabad, the capital and largest city of Badakhshan Province, has several hotels and tourist attractions. The Fayzabad Airport serves the population of the entire province. There is also a road network from Fayzabad to other districts. Tourists can book a hotel in the city and then drive from there to Ishkashim, which is a border town next to the Afghanistan–Tajikistan border. They can then drive to the Wakhan National Park in Wakhan District to as far as Baza'i Gonbad or the Wakhjir Pass (Afghanistan–China border). Wakhan is one of the most coldest and isolated districts of Afghanistan. Below are some notable tourist sites in Badakhshan Province:

- Wakhan National Park

== Badghis ==
Below are some notable tourist sites in Badghis Province:

- Shah-e Mashhad
- Paropamisus Mountains

== Baghlan ==
Below are some notable tourist sites in Baghlan Province:

- Surkh Kotal archaeological site

== Balkh ==
The Shrine of Ali is located in the center of Mazar-i-Sharif from there many people visit the border town of Hairatan, which sits next to the Amu River near the Afghanistan–Uzbekistan border. The ancient town of Balkh is located about 20 km (12 mi) northwest of Mazar-i-Sharif. Below are some notable tourist sites in Balkh Province:

- Shrine of Ali
- Green Mosque, Balkh
- Zadian Minaret
- Qala-i-Jangi

== Bamyan ==
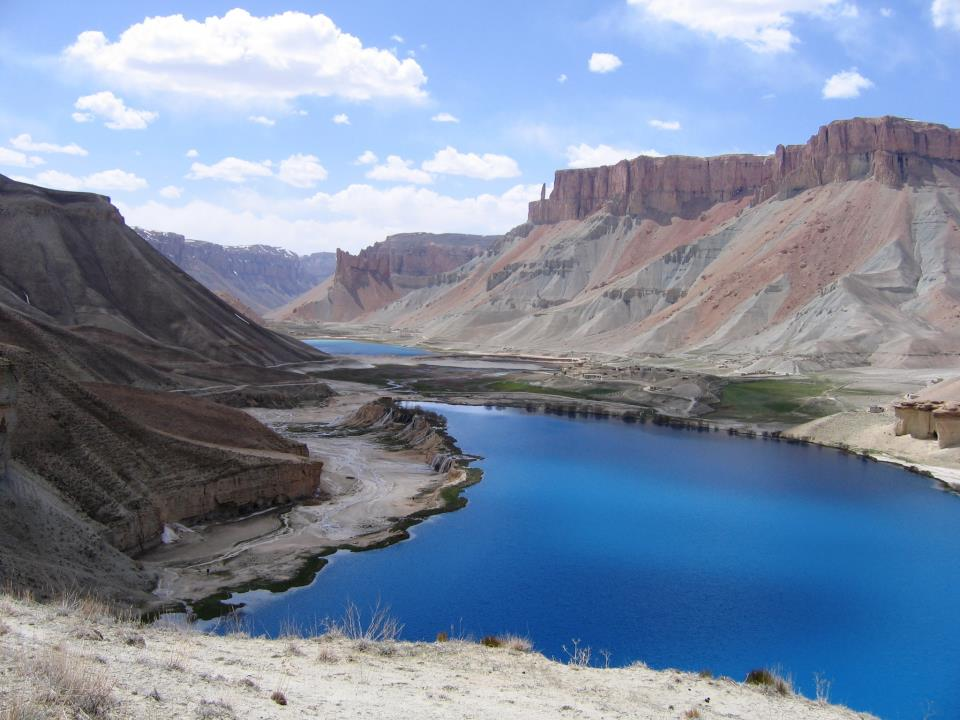
Band-e Amir National Park in the Bamyan Province of Afghanistan

The Band-e Amir National Park is located in the Bamyan Province of Afghanistan. There are several modern hotels in Bamyan, which is the capital of the province. The site of the Buddhas of Bamyan is also located in this province. Some people visit Bamyan in the winter for skiing purposes. Below are some notable tourist sites in Bamyan Province:

- Band-e Amir National Park
- Buddhas of Bamiyan
- Shahr-e Gholghola
- Zuhak
- Ajar Valley Nature Reserve

== Daikundi ==
Below are some notable tourist sites in Daikundi Province:

- Helmand River

== Farah ==
Below are some notable tourist sites in Farah Province:

- Farah Citadel
- The tomb of Muhammad Jaunpuri

== Faryab ==
Below are some notable tourist sites in Faryab Province:

- Shirin Tagab River
- Andkhoy

== Ghazni ==
A number of mausoleums of Ghaznavid rulers are located in and around the ancient city of Ghazni. Below are some notable sites for travelers to visit in Ghazni Province:

- Band-e Sultan
- Burial site of Al-Biruni
- Burial site of Mahmud of Ghazni
- Citadel of Ghazni
- Ghazni Minarets
- Jaghori
- Sardeh Band Dam
- Palace of Sultan Mas'ud III
- Museum of Islamic Art, Ghazni

== Ghor ==
Below are some notable tourist sites in Ghor Province:

- Minaret of Jam Unesco World Heritage Site

== Helmand ==
Below are some notable tourist sites in Helmand Province:

- Kajaki Dam
- Lashkargah Mosque
- Lashkari Bazar
- Qala-e-Bost
- Sangin Valley

== Herat ==
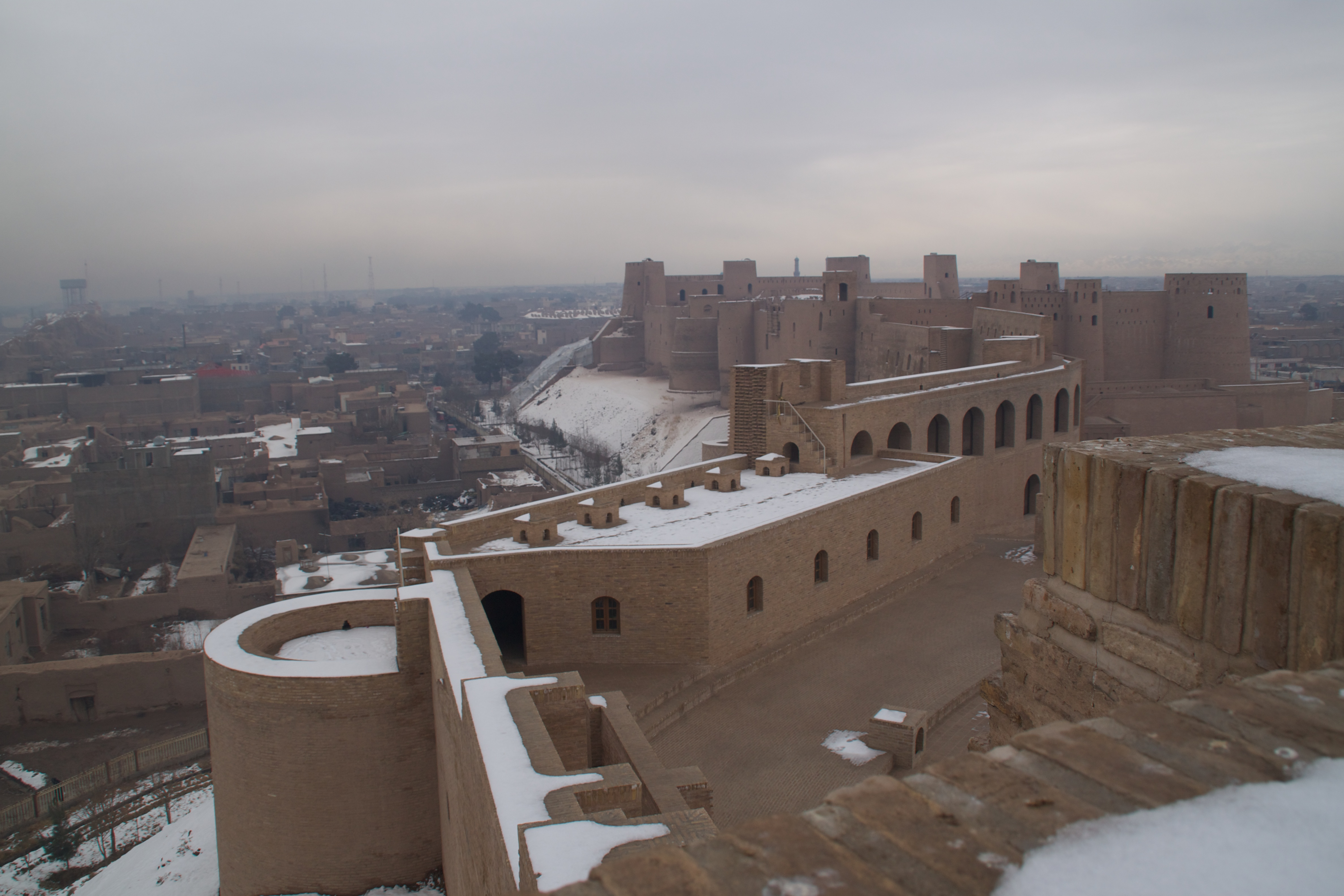
Herat Citadel in Herat, Afghanistan

Herat, which is the capital of Herat Province, is an ancient city that has many historical sites for visitors to see. Below are some notable tourist sites in Herat Province:

- Gawhar Shad Mausoleum
- Great Mosque of Herat
- Herat Citadel
- Islam Qala (border town near the Afghanistan–Iran border)
- Jihad Museum
- Musalla complex
- Salma Dam (Afghanistan-India Friendship Dam)
- Shrine of Khwaja Abd Allah
- Herat National Museum
- Jihad Museum
- Takht-e Safar

== Jowzjan ==
Below are some notable tourist sites in Jowzjan Province:

- Tilya Tepe archaeological site

== Kabul ==
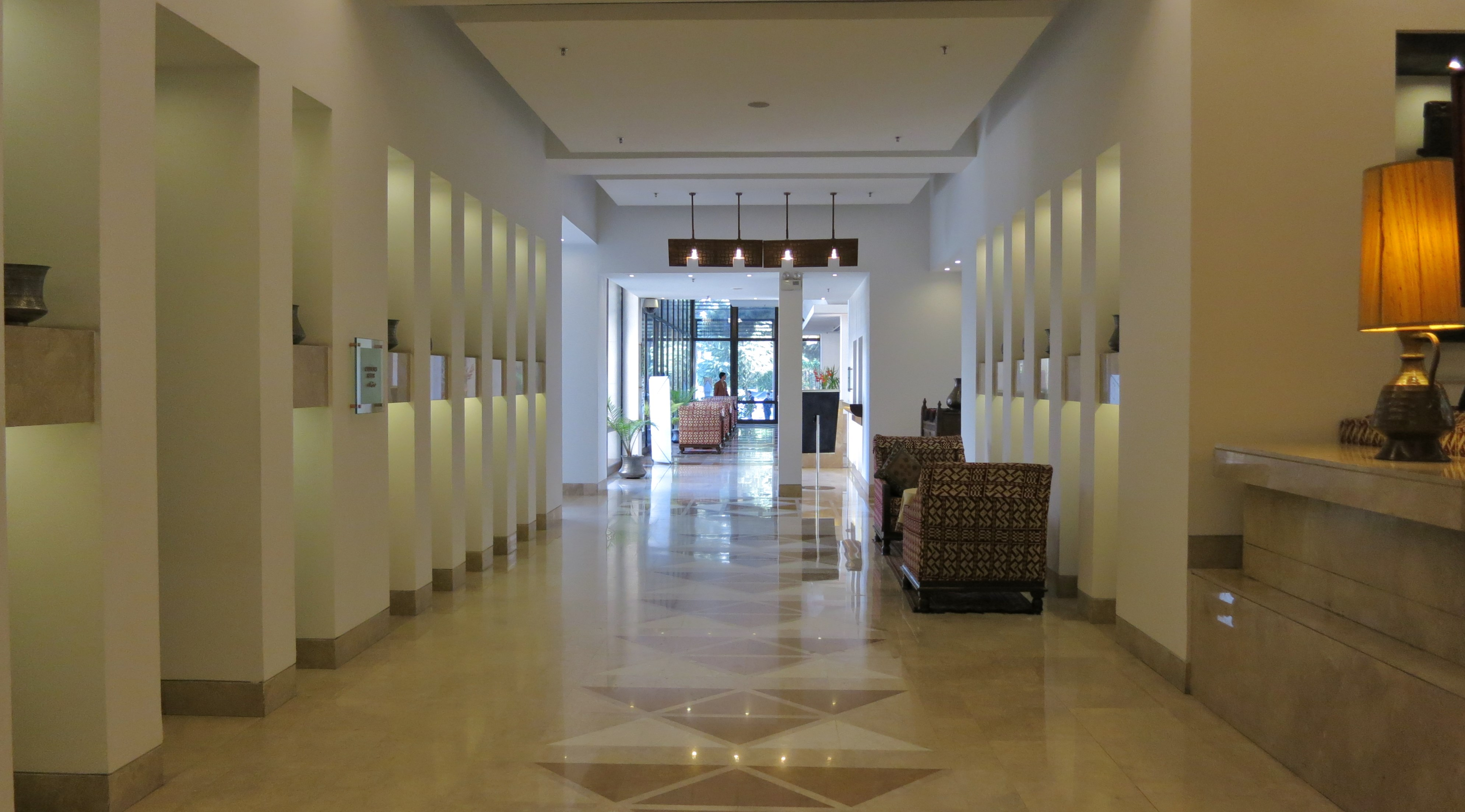
Inside the Kabul Serena Hotel

Kabul has many hotels, guest houses and tourist attractions. The Kabul International Airport has an international terminal and a domestic terminal. There is also a bus terminal that provides coach (bus) service to other provinces of the country.

The Ghazi Stadium often hosts football matches. Next to the stadium is an indoor skating ground called Skateistan. There are two bowling alleys, one is named Bravo Bowling and Cafe while the other is named Striker Bowling. There are also two indoor water parks, and several snooker and billiards clubs in different parts of the city. Below are some notable sites for travelers to visit in Kabul Province:

=== Abdul Rahman Mosque ===
The Abdul Rahman Mosque, which was completed in late 2009 and officially inaugurated in July 2012, is one of the largest mosques in Kabul. It is adjacent to the Zarnegar Park in the Wazir Akbar Khan neighborhood of the city, not far from the Kabul Serena Hotel.

=== Arg ===
The Arg means 'citadel' in Pashto. The Arg was built after the destruction of the Bala Hissar in 1880 by the British Indian troops

=== Bagh-e Babur ===
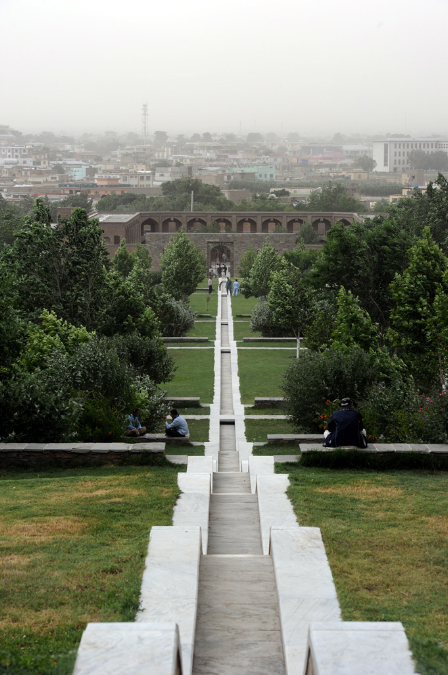
Gardens of Babur

The Gardens of Babur is a historic park in Kabul. It is the resting-place of Babur, the first emperor of the Mughal Empire. The gardens are thought to have been developed in the 16th century when Babur gave orders for the construction of an avenue garden in the city, described in some detail in his memoirs, the Baburnama.

=== Bala Hissar ===
The Bala Hissar is a fortress believed to be built over 1,500 years ago. It was last destroyed by the British in the 19th century and was then abandoned. It is being restored.

=== Chihil Sutun ===
The Chihil Sutun Palace was built in the late 19th century for Habibullah Khan, who was Prince at the time. It was later used primarily as a guest house for diplomats and important figures such as U.S. President Eisenhower and Nikita Khrushchev of the USSR.

=== Darul Aman Palace ===
The Darul Aman Palace (King's Palace) was built for King Amanullah Khan. It sits directly across from the parliament building in the southern section of the city.

=== Eid Gah Mosque ===
The Id Gah Mosque is one of the oldest and largest mosques in Kabul. Its historical importance has been that of Faisal Mosque in Islamabad, Pakistan, where top officials and the city's wealthy people would perform Eid prayers.

=== Habibullah Zazai Park ===
Habibullah Zazai Park is the largest amusement park located in and around Ahmad Shah Baba Mina, which is in the far eastern part of Kabul. The park sits on a hillside and provides large walking space with beautiful views of the city. Another such park is called the City Park, which is much smaller and located near Kabul Zoo.

=== Kabul Zoo ===
Kabul Zoo has around 280 animals, which includes 45 species of birds and mammals and 36 species of fish. Among the animals there are two lions and a khanzir (pig), which is extremely rare in Afghanistan. As many as 5,000 people visit the zoo during the weekends.

=== National Museum of Afghanistan ===
The National Museum of Afghanistan sits next to the Darul Aman Palace in the southeastern section of the city. The museum's collection had earlier been one of the most important in Central Asia, with over 100,000 items dating back several millennia. With the start of the civil war in 1992, the museum was looted numerous times resulting in a loss of 70% of the 100,000 objects on display. Since 2007, a number of international organizations have helped to recover over 8,000 artifacts, the most recent being a limestone sculpture from Germany. Approximately 843 artifacts were returned by the United Kingdom in 2012, including the famous 1st Century Bagram Ivories.

=== Paghman ===
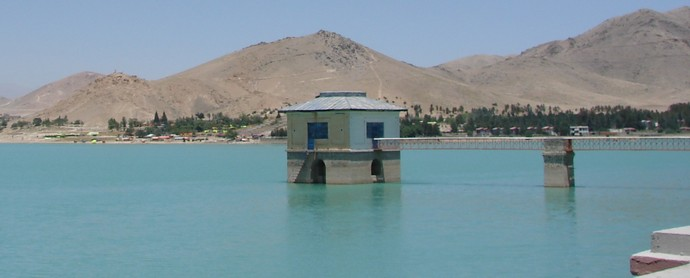
The Qargha picnic area is between Kabul and Paghman

Paghman has been used historically as a summer retreat. Most people go there for backpacking (hiking) and see large European style mansions and other structures, including the Paghman Citadel which was recently built. It is located northwest of Kabul. The Qargha picnic area is located on the way to Paghman. The area is being developed by the government to attract more visitors. There are a number of places to eat and relax.

=== Tajbeg Palace ===
The Tajbeg Palace (Queen's Palace) was built in the 1920s by King Amanullah Khan for Queen Soraya. It is located near the Darul Aman Palace. One of its purposes was for women of Afghanistan to address their issues with the Queen. Another was for women only parties to take place there. Afghanistan has always been a very conservative country where men and women do not sit or party together.

== Kandahar ==
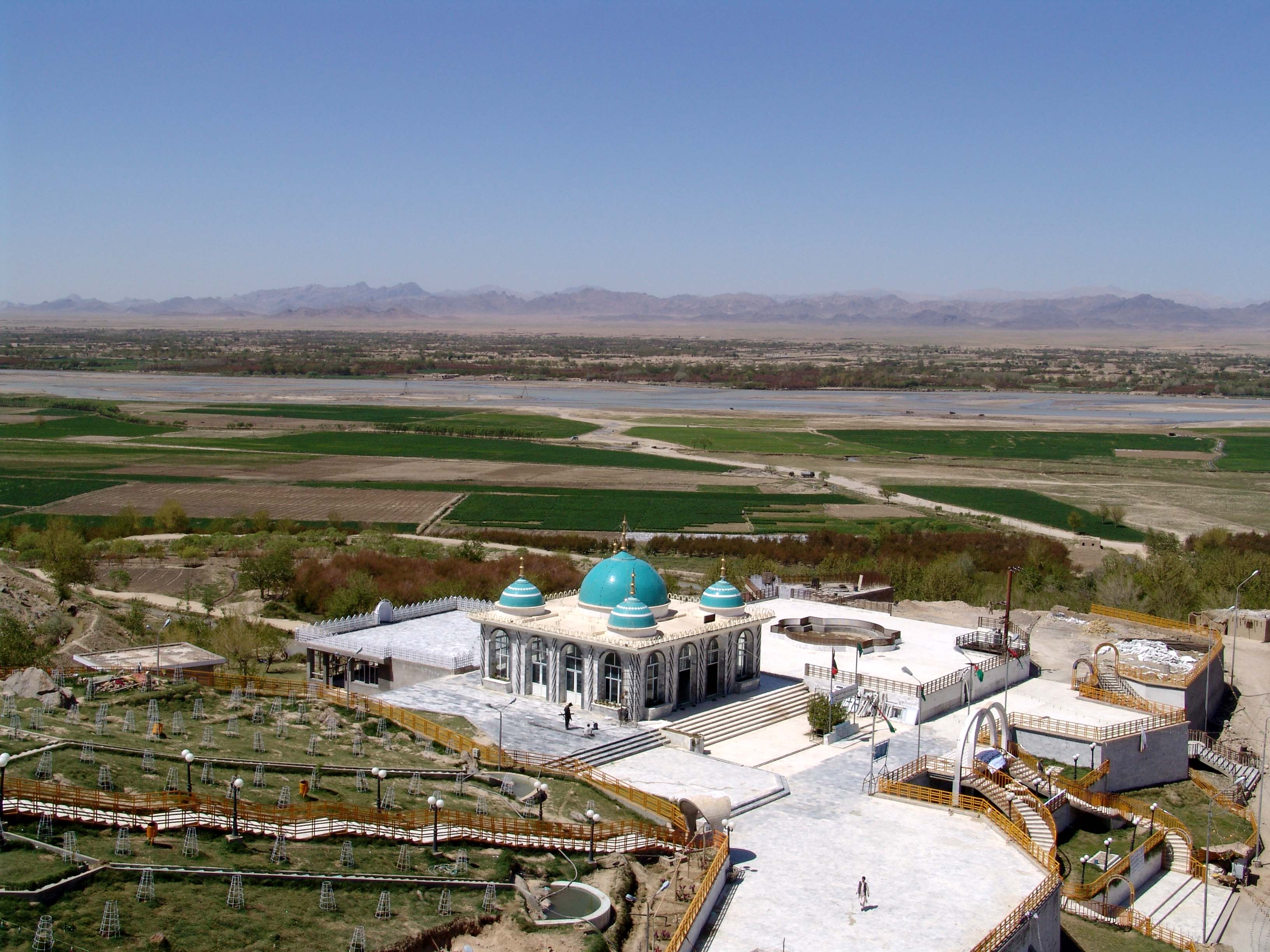
The shrine of Baba Wali next to the Arghandab River in Kandahar

Visiting Kandahar Province has long been avoided by foreign tourists due to insecurity. Despite that, a number of foreigners have visited the province in recent years. Aino Mina, which is located in the northeast of Kandahar, has a number of large mosques, parks, hotels, places to shop and eat, sports facilities, etc. There is also a bus terminal in Aino Mina. Another is located in the western end of Kandahar. Below are some notable sites for travelers to visit in Kandahar Province:

- Chilzina Park (historical site in Sarpuza)
- Dahla Dam (located in Shah Wali Kot District about 30 minutes drive north of the city)
- Maiwand (where the famous 1880 Battle of Maiwand was fought between Afghan and British forces)
- Mausoleum of Mirwais Hotak (located in Mirwais Mina in the western part of Kandahar)
- Mundigak (an Indus Valley site)
- Narange Qala (meaning "Orange Castle")
- Reg District (picnic area where men race SUVs in sand dunes)
- Shrine of the Cloak (across the street from the Kandahar Governor's House)
- Shrine of Baba Wali (hillside with trees providing great views of Arghandab River and farms)
- Shrine of Sher Soorkh (coronation place of Ahmad Shah Durrani)

== Kapisa ==
Below are some notable sites for travelers to visit in Kapisa Province:

- Shotorak monastery

== Khost ==
Below are some notable sites for travelers to visit in Khost Province:

- Khost Mosque

== Kunar ==
Below are some notable sites for travelers to visit in Kunar Province:

- Korangal Valley

== Kunduz ==
Below are some notable sites for travelers to visit in Kunduz Province:

- Kunduz River Valley

== Laghman ==
Below are some notable sites for travelers to visit in Laghman Province:

- Qala-e-Seraj
- Hajji Dunya Gul Niazi Jamia Masjid

== Logar ==
Below are some notable sites for travelers to visit in Logar Province:

- Mes Aynak archaeological site

== Nangarhar ==
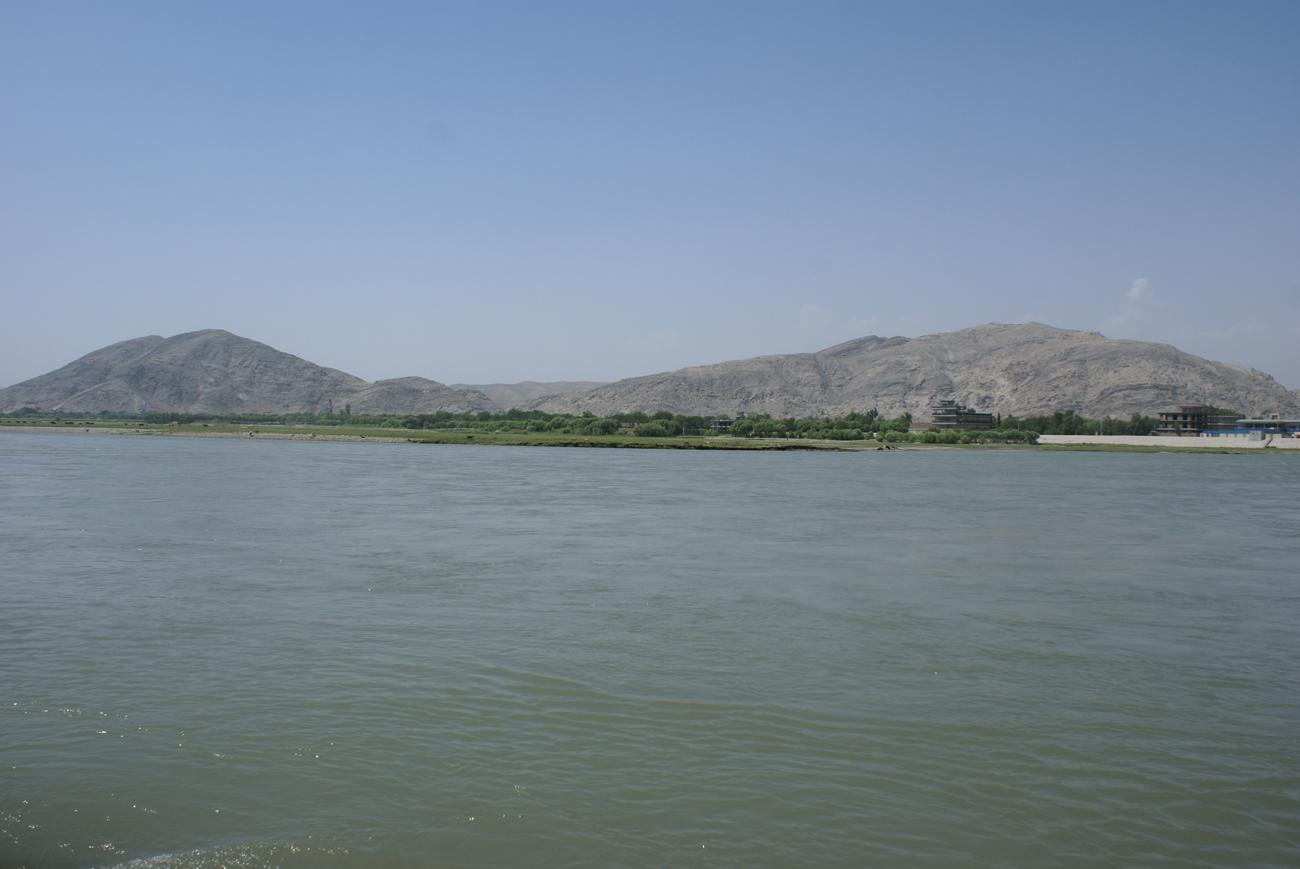
Kabul River near Jalalabad in Nangarhar Province

Jalalabad, the capital of Nangarhar Province, has a number of hotels and tourist attractions. Below are some notable sites for travelers to visit in Nangarhar Province:

- Amir Habibullah Khan Park (across the street from Siraj-ul-Emarat Park)
- Darunta Dam
- Ghazi Amanullah Khan Town (Ghazi Amanullah Khan Park and Ghazi Amanullah Khan International Cricket Stadium)
- Mausoleum of Amanullah Khan (Siraj-ul-Emarat Park)
- Mausoleum of Khan Abdul Ghaffar Khan
- Mausoleum of Mohammad Gul Khan Momand
- Torkham (border crossing between Afghanistan and Pakistan)
- Nangarhar Provincial Museum

== Nimruz ==
Below are some notable sites for travelers to visit in Nimruz Province:

- Kamal Khan Dam (national park)
- Zaranj (border town near the Afghanistan–Iran border)
- Ibrahim Khan Sanjrani Fort

== Nuristan ==
Below are some notable sites for travelers to visit in Nuristan Province:

- Nuristan National Park

== Oruzgan ==
Below are some notable sites for travelers to visit in Oruzgan Province:

- Tiri Rud River

== Paktia ==
Below are some notable sites for travelers to visit in Paktia Province:

- Shah-i-Kot Valley
- Mount Sikaram on the Afghanistan–Pakistan border
- Bala Hesar fortress in Gardez

== Paktika ==
Below are some notable sites for travelers to visit in Paktika Province:

- Gomal River

== Panjshir ==
Below are some notable sites for travelers to visit in Panjshir Province:

- Mausoleum of Ahmad Shah Massoud in Bazarak
- Panjshir Valley

== Parwan ==
Below are some notable sites for travelers to visit in Parwan Province:

- Salang Pass
- Salang mountains
- Shibar Pass
- Kushan Pass

== Samangan ==
Below are some notable sites for travelers to visit in Samangan Province:

- Takht-e Rostam
- Malek Cave
- Hazar Sum

== Sar-e Pol ==
Below are some notable sites for travelers to visit in Sar-e Pol Province:

- Balkhab River
- Sari Pul River

== Takhar ==
Below are some notable sites for travelers to visit in Takhar Province:

- Ai-Khanoum archaeological site

== Wardak ==
Below are some notable sites for travelers to visit in Wardak Province:

- Tangi Valley
- Hajigak Pass
- Sanglakh Valley

== Zabul ==
Below are some notable sites for travelers to visit in Zabul Province:

- Qalat-e Gilzay in Qalati Ghilji
- Koh e Alburz

== Stamps ==
Below is a series of old post stamps of Afghanistan from the 1950s, 1960s, and 1970s that promote tourism in the country.

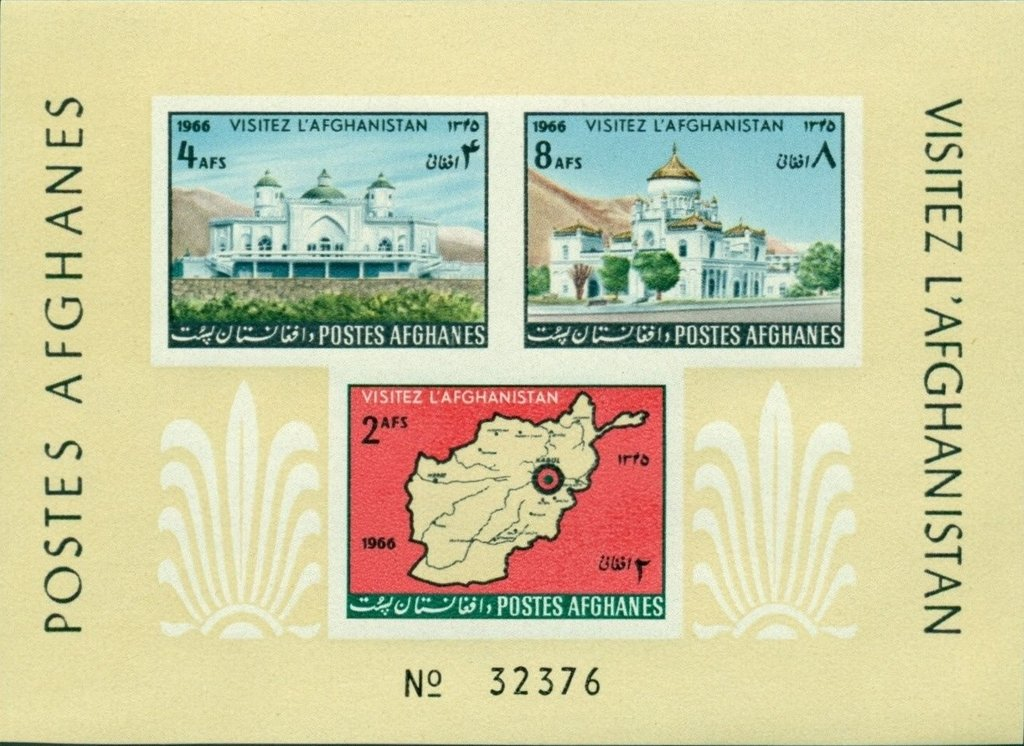
Bagh-e Bala Palace and the Mausoleum of Abdur Rahman Khan, both in Kabul

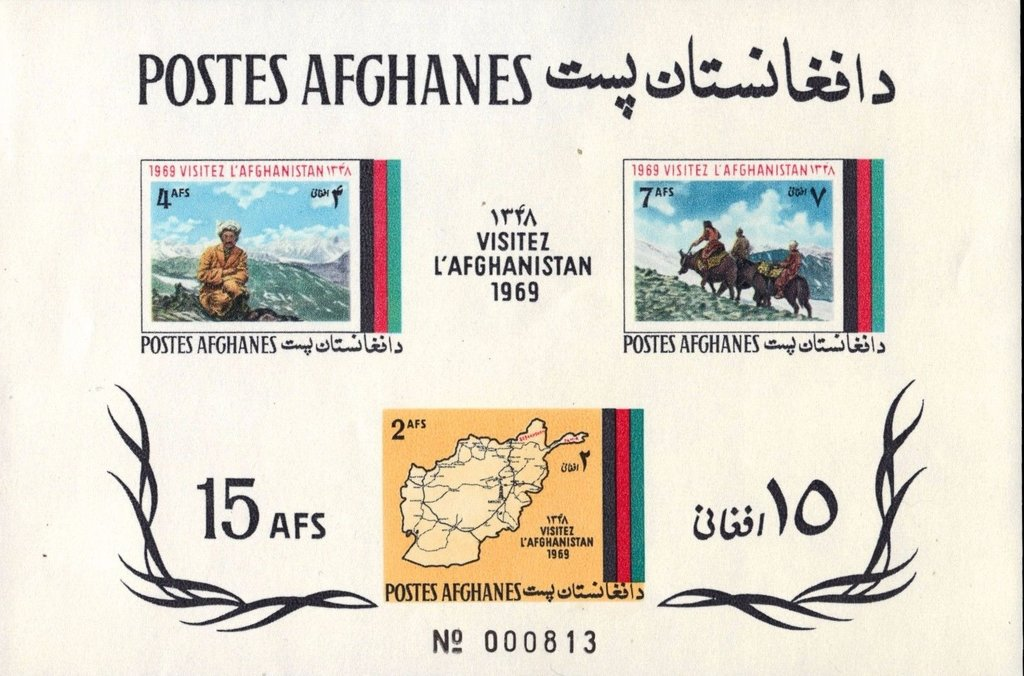
Badakhshan region and the Pamir Mountains

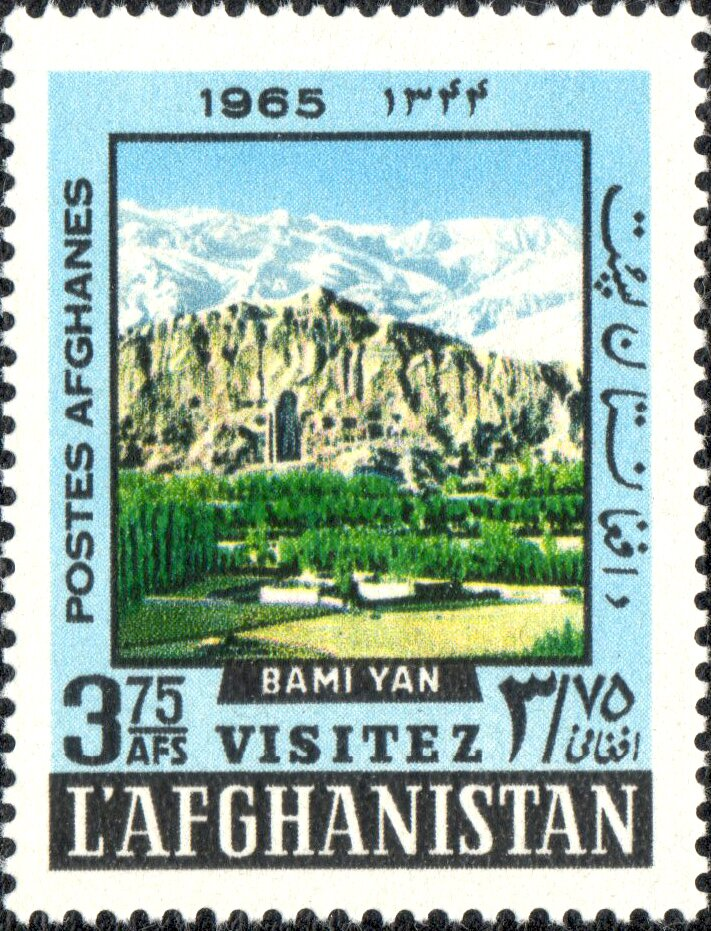
Buddhas of Bamyan

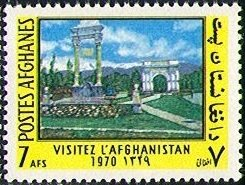
Triumphal arch of Paghman

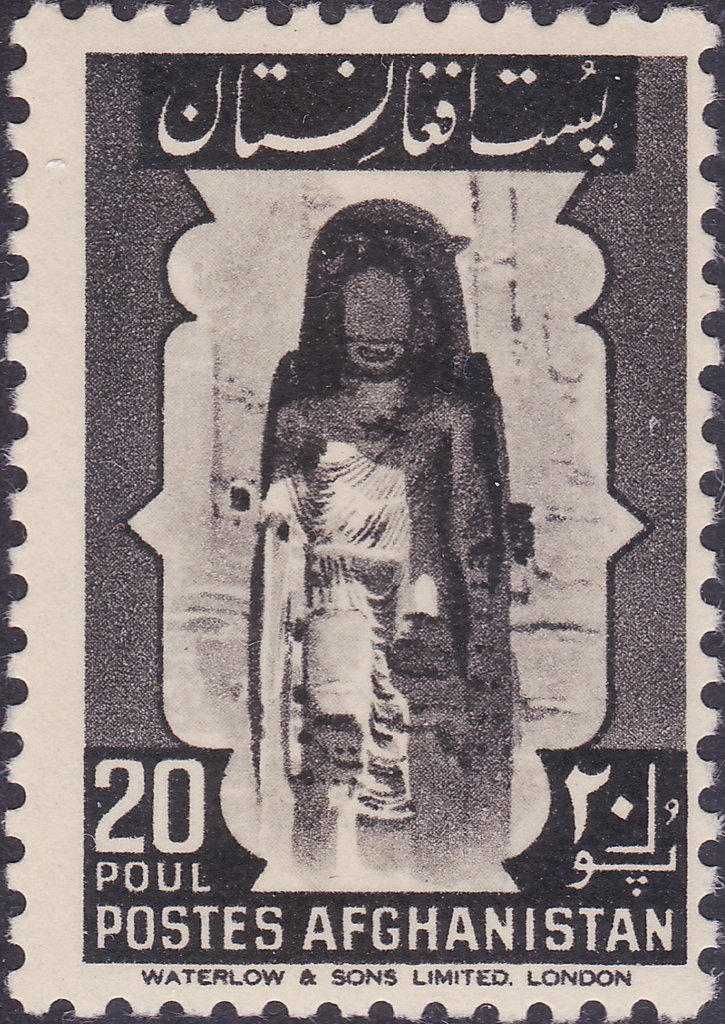
Bamiyan themed postage stamp (1951) issued by Postes Afghanes (Afghan Post)

== See also ==
- Economy of Afghanistan
- Geography of Afghanistan
- Visa policy of Afghanistan
