= Council of Union =

Council of Union may refer to:

== Political bodies ==
- Union councils of Bangladesh
- Council of the European Union
- European Council
- Union Council of Ministers, India
- Council of Union, an early translation of the Federation Council (Iraq)
- Union councils of Pakistan
- Union of Unions, Russian Empire

== Trade unions ==
- Australian Council of Trade Unions
  - Queensland Council of Unions
- All India Central Council of Trade Unions
- Central Council of United Trade Unions, Iran, 1944–1953
  - Central Council of Trade Unions, Persia, 1921–1928
- National Council of Trade Unions, predecessor of the Korean Confederation of Trade Unions
- New Zealand Council of Trade Unions
- Council of Nordic Trade Unions
- National Council of Trade Unions, South Africa, 1986–present
  - Council of Unions of South Africa, 1980–1986
- All-Ukrainian Council of Trade Unions

== Other uses ==
- Council of National Golf Unions, Britain and Ireland
- World Council of Credit Unions

== See also ==
- Union council (disambiguation)
- Council of Trade Unions (disambiguation)
