= Murad Khane =

Neighborhood in Kabul

Coordinates: 34°31′05″N 69°10′55″E

Murad Khane or Murad Khani (Dari: مراد خانی) is a small historical neighborhood in Kabul, Afghanistan. The neighborhood is part of the city's District 2, situated north of the Kabul River between Da Afghanistan Bank, Ministry of Defense, Eidgah Mosque, Pul-e Khishti Mosque and Kabul Serena Hotel. The Abul Fazl Shrine is in this neighborhood.

== History ==
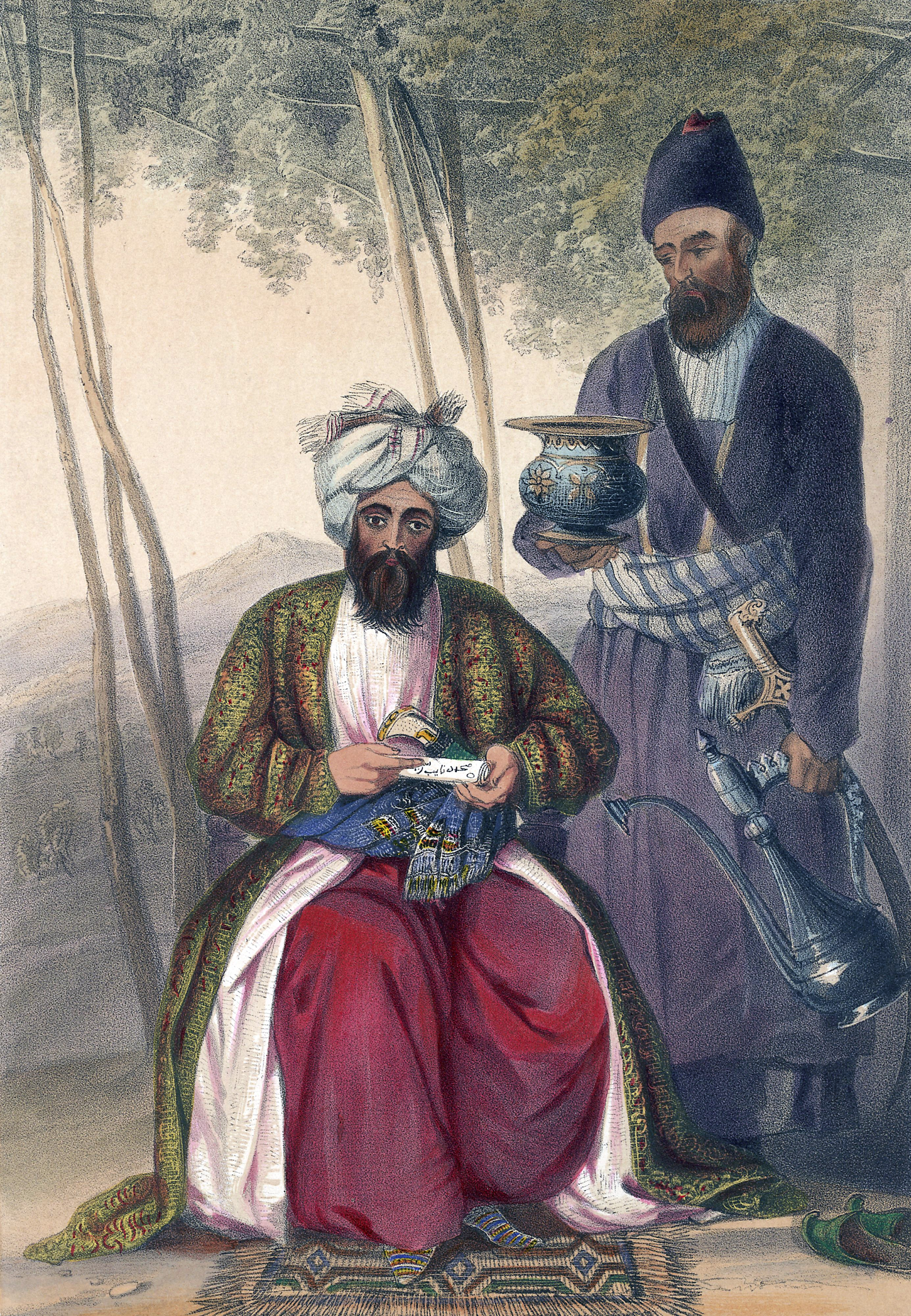
Mohammad Naib Sharif, leader of the Qizilbash in Afghanistan during the First Anglo-Afghan War

Murad Khane was named after two Murad Khans: one the brother of a 17th-century Mughal governor and the second an 18th-century general. The area was developed in the 18th century by Ahmad Shah Durrani, the founder of the Durrani Empire. As part of this development, many ornate structures were constructed to serve as housing for members of the Qizilbash tribe. The district was laid out in a traditional Islamic pattern, around a mosque, bath-house, garden and bazaar.

Soviet modernization efforts in 1975, neglect and civil war, threatened and destroyed many buildings in the area.

Despite these threats, "Murad Khane retains much of its original fabric with a network of small streets connecting the bazaar, religious structures, caravanserai and houses in a layout that represents the area's unique ties to Islamic design and nearly four hundred years of Afghan history." It is one of the few surviving historic commercial and residential neighbourhoods in Kabul.

== Conservation ==
In 2006, the Turquoise Mountain Foundation began restoration work in Murad Khane, headed by Rory Stewart. By then, it had become one of the poorest areas in Kabul and in 2008 it was added to the World Monuments Fund's Watch List of the world's most endangered sites. Turquoise Mountain began to clear out the garbage that had accumulated over the years and set to work restoring the historic houses. Turquoise Mountain has now restored or rebuilt 150 damaged homes, documented built and intangible cultural heritage, opened the Institute for Afghan Arts and Architecture to train young people in traditional crafts, opened a Primary School and Family Health Clinic for the local residents, and hosted thousands of visitors to the revived neighbourhood. Turquoise Mountain's work in Murad Khane was shown as part of an exhibit, Turquoise Mountain: Artists Transforming Afghanistan, at Washington, D.C.’s Arthur M. Sackler Gallery.

== See also ==
- Tourism in Afghanistan
