= 2011 Afghanistan Ashura bombings =

Suicide bombing in Kabul and Mazar-i-Sharif

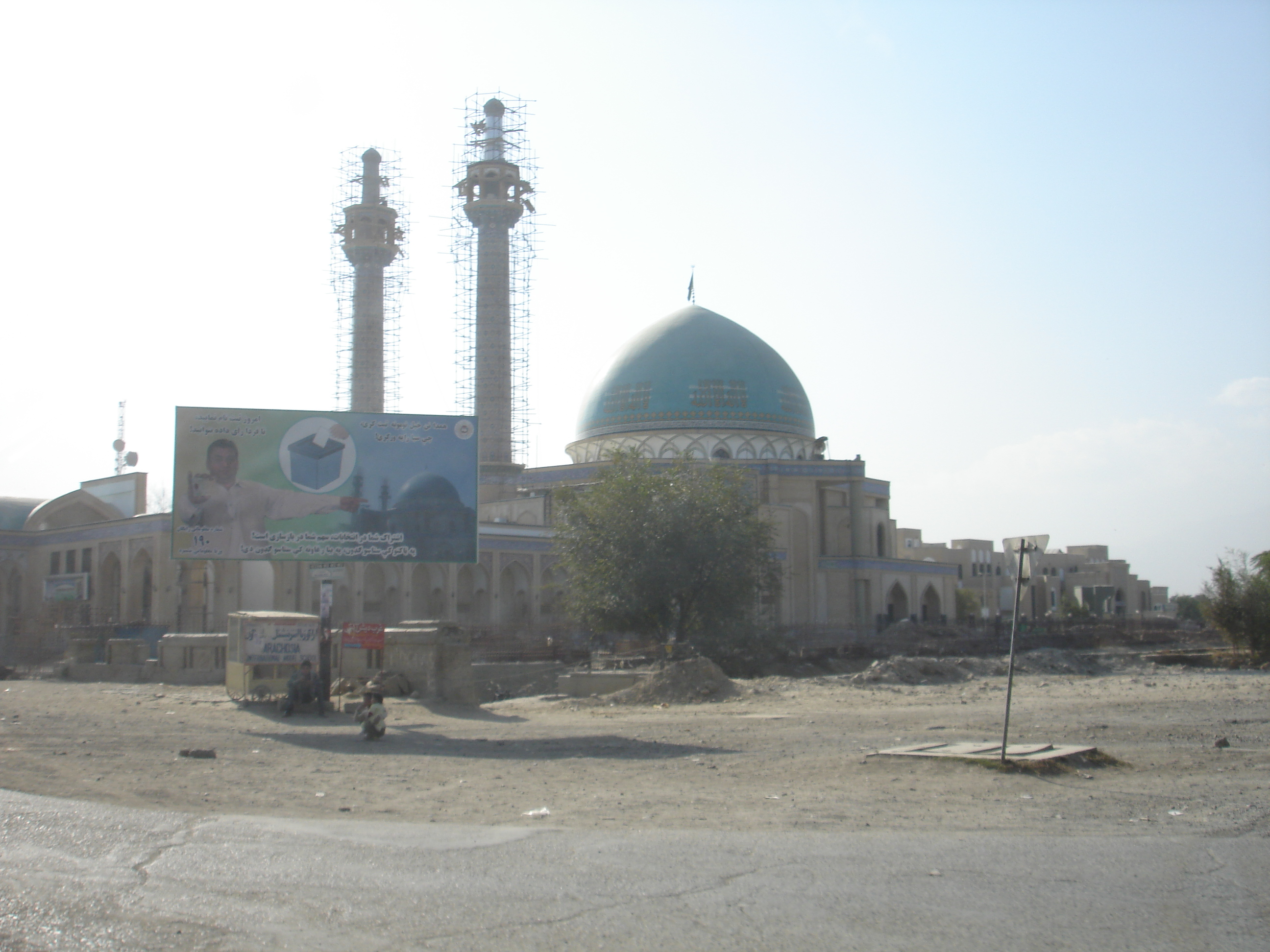
- The Abul Fazl Mosque in 2008

- Locations of the incidents
- Location: Kabul; Mazar-i-Sharif
- Date: 6 December 2011; 12:00 (AFT)
- Target: Shia
- Attack type: Suicide bombing IED bombing
- Deaths: 80+
- Injuries: 160+

The 2011 Afghanistan Ashura bombings were a pair of bombings in the Afghan capital of Kabul and Mazar-e-Sharif. The Kabul suicide bombing took place at around noon local time, on the day when Muslims commemorate Ashura, an annual holy day throughout the Muslim world particularly by the Shi'a Muslims.

The first attack took place at the gate of a Shi'a shrine in Kabul and was caused by a suicide bomber. The second incident took place in the northern Afghan city of Mazar-i-Sharif, where a bomb was affixed to a bicycle that exploded near a mosque shortly after the Kabul blast. The suicide blast in Kabul resulted in the deaths of more than 70 civilians, which included women and children, while the Mazar-i-Sharif blast claimed at least 4 lives. The third was in the southern city of Kandahar, where five people received injuries. The total number of dead in all the attacks reached about 80, while over 160 more were injured.

== Attacks ==
=== Kabul ===
A suicide bomber attacked the Abul Fazl Mosque in the Murad Khane neighborhood of Kabul on 6 December 2011, which claimed more than 50 lives. Reports suggested that the suicide bomber was carrying a backpack and may have been full of explosives. The blast took place at around 12 noon (07 30 GMT) at the gate of the Abu Fazl shrine, which is a place mostly visited by Shias. Hundreds of Afghans had gathered to commemorate Ashura, the day on which Husayn ibn Ali the grandson of Muhammad along with 72 followers were murdered in Kerbala, Iraq. According to the statement released by Interior Ministry, a man wearing suicide vest blew himself up inside the shrine where Shi'ite mourners were observing the martyrdom of Hussayn.

=== Mazar-i-Sharif ===
The second bomb took place near the Blue Mosque in the northern city of Mazar-e-Sharif, where four people were killed. The bomb was reportedly hidden on a bicycle, and went off shortly after the Kabul blast.

== Victims ==
More than 70 people were killed following the explosion at the Abul Fazl Mosque in Kabul, while four people were killed in Mazar-i-Sharif, taking the total death toll to at least 74. The U.S. Embassy in Kabul confirmed that one of the dead was a United States citizen. A number of local and international photojournalists were present when the Kabul bomb exploded. Images appeared in which children were seen screaming or were dead.

== Responsibility ==
Ali Sher-e-Khuda, a man claiming to belong to the Pakistan-based Lashkar-e-Jhangvi, told BBC News that his group was behind the attacks. According to Mark Toner, spokesman for U.S. Department of State, "It's been responsible for many attacks within Pakistan. So it's clearly a threat to both countries, and it's precisely the kind of organisation that the secretary (of state) was trying to address when she went to Pakistan in calling for Pakistan to do more to combat this kind of extremist terrorist activity within its own borders."

In June 2012, two men from Nangarhar Province of Afghanistan named Rahim Gul and Habibullah confessed to transporting the suicide bomber from Peshawar, Pakistan. The Attorney General of Afghanistan, Mohammad Ishaq Aloko, stated that "The attack was planned and organized in Peshawar and executed on the holy day." He said "the bombing was an attempt to create division between Afghan Sunni and Shiite Muslims", and alleged that "the Pakistani intelligence service was involved in the attack."

Initially, Afghan Interior Minister Bismillah Khan Mohammadi had accused the Taliban of organising the suicide attack inside a shrine in Kabul but Taliban spokesman Zabiullah Mujahid denied involvement. Afghanistan President Hamid Karzai said he would discuss the matter with Pakistan.

== Reactions ==
Hundreds of people had joined funeral processions held the next day. The attack was also condemned by leaders of different ethnic groups said that it was aimed at creating a sectarian war in the country but that they would not turn to violence and instead would stand united in condemning the attack. The United Nation Security Council also condemned the attack.

== See also ==
- List of terrorist attacks in Kabul
