= Nangarhar (disambiguation) =

Nangarhar Province is a province of Afghanistan.

Nangarhar can also mean:

- Nangarhar University, a university in Jalalabad, Afghanistan
- Nangarhar Provincial Museum, a museum in Hadda, Afghanistan
- "Nangarhar Killings" is another name for the 2007 Shinwar shooting
