= Museum of Islamic Art =

Museum of Islamic Art may refer to:

- Museum of Islamic Art, Berlin, Germany
- Museum of Islamic Art, Cairo, Egypt
- Museum of Islamic Art, Doha, Qatar
- Museum of Islamic Art, Ghazni, Afghanistan
- Museum of Islamic Art in Raqqada, Tunisia
- Al Batha Museum of Islamic Arts in Fez, Morocco

== See also ==
- Islamic Arts Museum Malaysia, Kuala Lumpur
- Islamic Museum, Jerusalem
- Museum for Islamic Art, Jerusalem, formerly L.A. Mayer Institute for Islamic Art, Israel
- Museum of Islamic Ceramics, Cairo, Egypt
- The David Collection, Copenhagen, Denmark
- Topkapi Palace, Istanbul, Turkey
