= Habibullah Zazai Park =

Amusement park in Kabul, Afghanistan

- Zazai Park
- د حبيب الله ځاځي پارک پارک حبیب الله زازی
- Interactive map of Habibullah Zazai Park
- Location: Ahmad Shah Baba Mina, Kabul, Afghanistan
- Coordinates: 34°28′28″N 69°20′06″E
- Elevation: 1,907 m (6,257 ft)
- Founder: Habibullah Zazai
- Status: Active
- Hiking trails: Yes
- Plants: Yes
- Species: Pine, maple, weeping, shrub, flower
- Parking: Yes
- Website: hzep.af

Habibullah Zazai Park, (Note: Pashto: د حبيب الله ځاځي پارک Dari: پارک حبیب الله زازی) also known simply as Zazai Park, is an amusement park and a recreation area in the eastern part of Kabul, Afghanistan. It is near the Sayed Jamaluddin Afghan Township, which is east of Bagrami and south of Ahmad Shah Baba Mina.

The amusement park is named after Habibullah Zazai, its owner and developer. The two "z" letters in Zazai are correctly pronounced the same like in the given name of Hollywood star, Zsa Zsa Gabor.

Zazai park has various rides and provides large walking space with great views of the city. Among the rides, the Ferris wheel, pirate ship and swing ride are the popular ones. The park also has a mosque, an indoor arcade, and places to lounge and eat food.

== See also ==
- City Park, Kabul
- Tourism in Afghanistan
