= Gaza Mosque =

Mosque in Kabul, Afghanistan

- د غزې جومات مسجد غزه
- Location of the mosque in Afghanistan

Religion
- Affiliation: Sunni Islam
- Ecclesiastical or organisational status: Mosque
- Status: Active

Location
- Location: Qua-ye-Markaz, Kabul
- Country: Afghanistan
- Interactive map of Gaza Mosque
- Administration: Ministry of Hajj and Religious Affairs
- Coordinates: 34°31′45″N 69°09′32″E

Architecture
- Type: Mosque
- Style: Islamic architecture
- Funded by: Habibuddin Rezayi
- Completed: 2025
- Capacity: 500 worshippers

The Gaza Mosque (Note: Pashto: د غزې جومات Dari: مسجد غزه) is a Sunni mosque located in the Qua-ye-Markaz area of Kabul, the capital of Afghanistan, near the city's famous carpet market.

Inaugurated on 11 January 2025, the mosque was named after Gaza in order to express solidarity with the Palestinian people and honor the soldiers and victims of Gaza war. The two-story mosque, which can accommodate approximately 500 worshippers, was built using public donations on land provided by the Kabul municipality. Habibuddin Rezayi, a businessman, led the fundraising efforts to construct the mosque.

== See also ==
- Islam in Afghanistan
- List of mosques in Afghanistan
