= Kabul Grand Hotel =

Luxury hotel in Kabul, Afghanistan

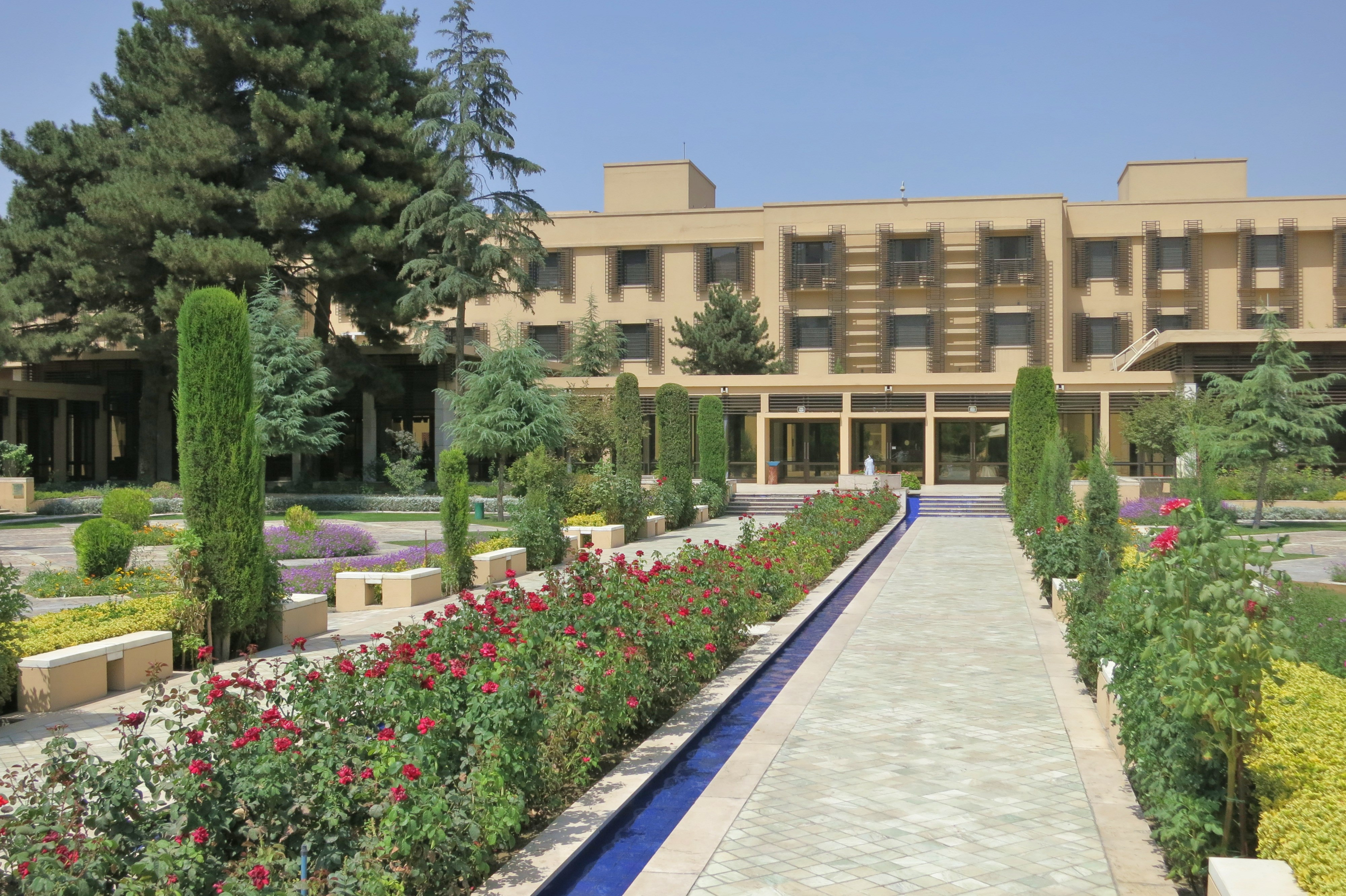
- The inner garden of the hotel

- Location within Afghanistan

General information
- Location: District 2, Kabul, Afghanistan
- Coordinates: 34°31′14″N 69°10′41″E
- Opening: 1945; Reopened; November 8, 2005; 20 years ago
- Owner: Government of Afghanistan
- Operator: Cinderella International Group

Design and construction
- Developer: Aga Khan Development Network (AKDN)

Other information
- Number of rooms: 177

Website
- https://kabulgrandhotel.com/

The Kabul Grand Hotel (formerly the Kabul Serena Hotel) is a luxury hotel in downtown Kabul, Afghanistan. It is located between Wazir Akbar Khan and Deh Afghanan neighborhoods, near the Arg and next to Zarnegar Park.

== History ==
The property was built in 1945 as the Kabul Hotel.

The hotel was completely rebuilt by the Aga Khan Development Network between 2002 and 2005 to designs by Canadian architect Ramesh Khosla. The renamed Kabul Serena Hotel was inaugurated by President Hamid Karzai and Aga Khan IV on November 8, 2005.

On 1 February 2025, the Serena Hotel Group ended its operation of the hotel, which was renamed the Kabul Grand Hotel. It is now managed by Cinderella International Group, a German company.

=== Incidents ===
Adolph Dubs, United States ambassador to Afghanistan, was killed at the hotel in 1979.

The hotel was the target of terrorist attacks in January 2008 and March 2014.

== Facilities ==
It is set in landscaped gardens, overlooking the city's Zarnegar Park. The hotel has 177 rooms and suites. It has several restaurants, including the Café Zarnegar serving Afghan cuisine, the Wild Rice fine-dining restaurant serving Southeast Asian cuisine, the Serena Pastry Shop serving homemade breads, cakes and patisseries and the Char Chata Lounge. The hotel also includes Maisha Spa & Health Club, offering a fitness centre, a steam room, a sauna, and outdoor heated swimming pool.

The design reflects classic Islamic architecture.

== Gallery ==
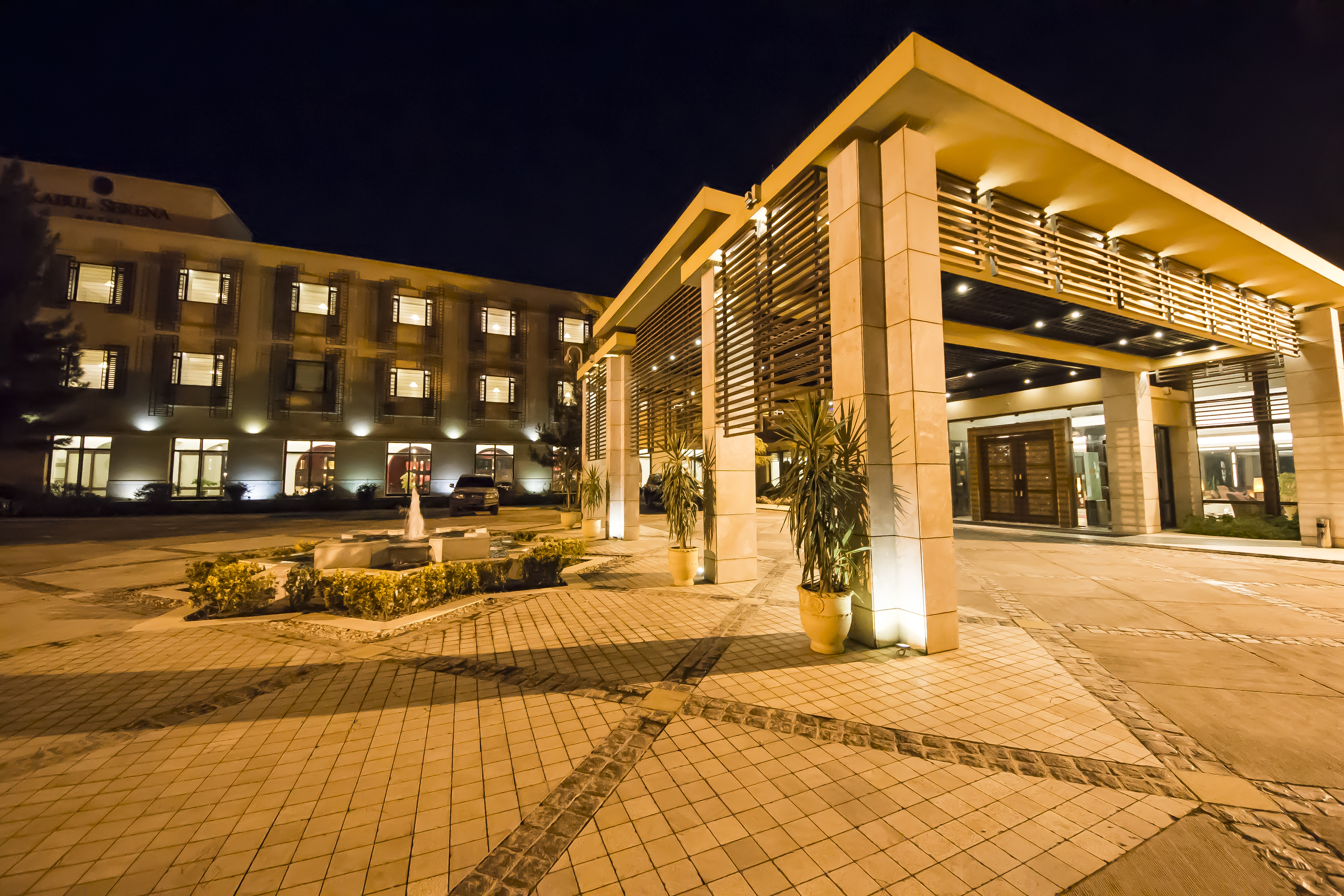
Entrance

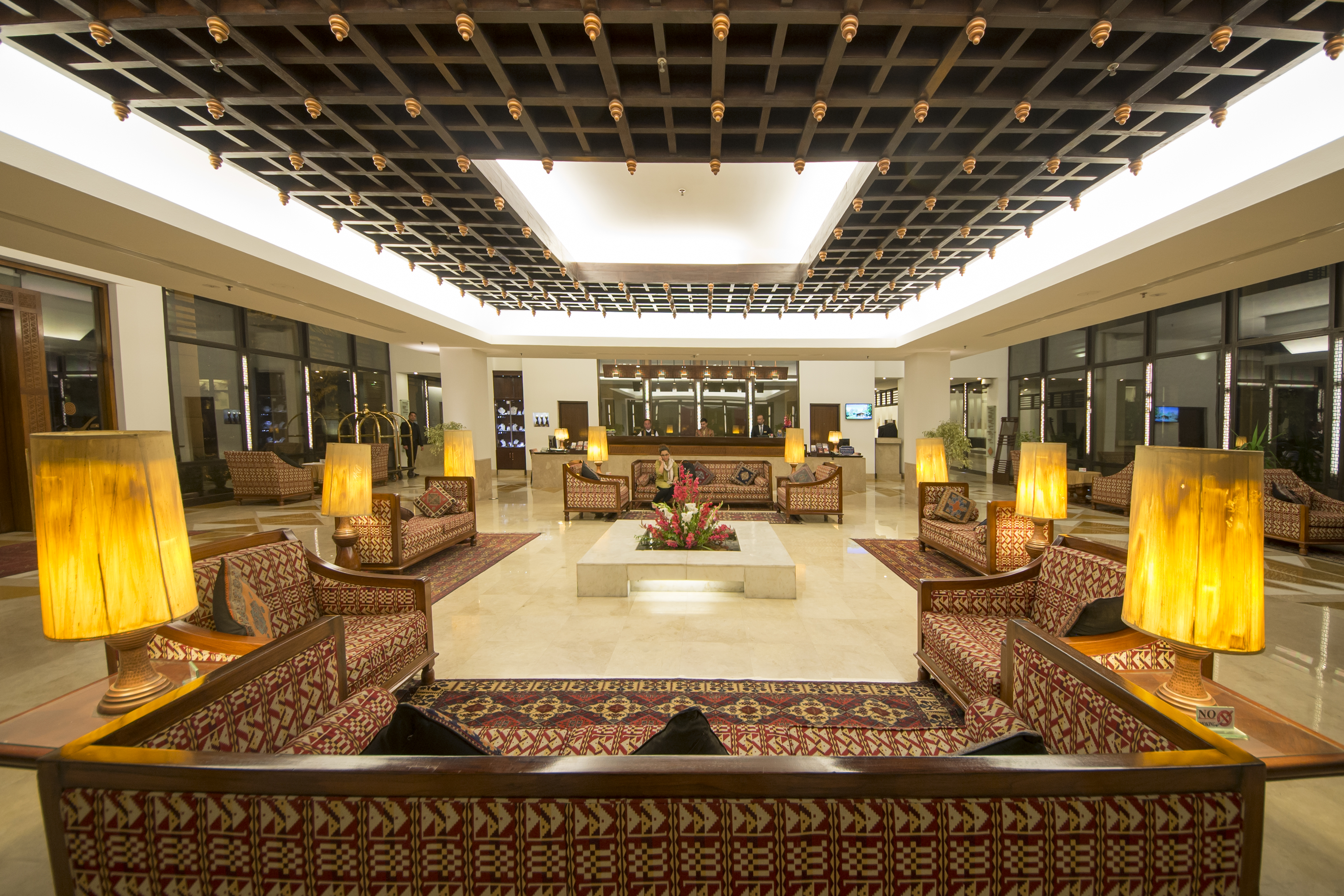
Inside

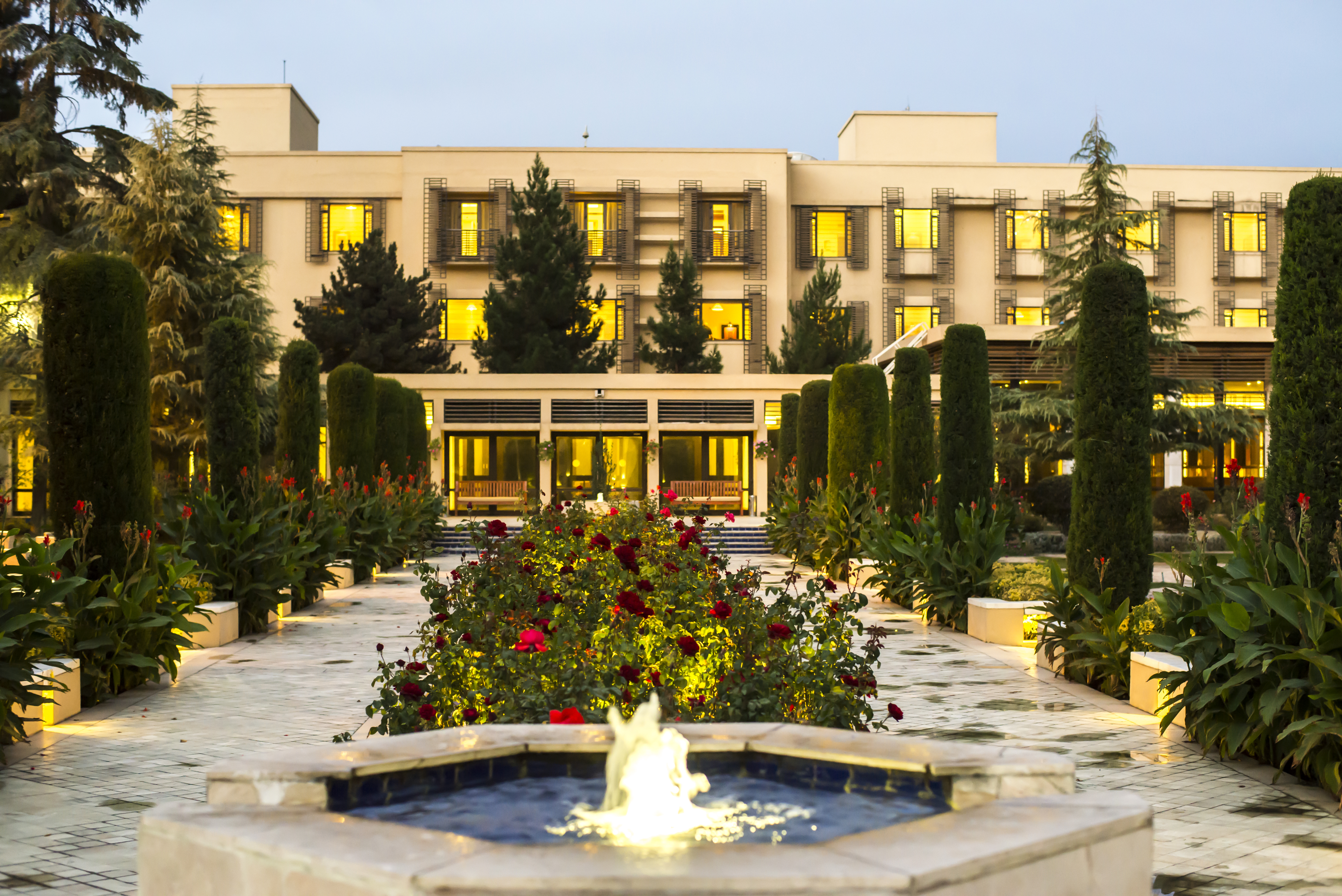
Garden
