= Amir Khusrou Balkhi Library =

Library in Afghanistan

Coordinates: 34.4955°N 69.105°E

The Amir Khusrou Balkhi Library (Persian: کتابخانهٔ امیرخسرو بلخی) is a library in Afghanistan. In the 1990s, it held about 20,000 books, journals, newspapers and rare books. Materials were focused in history, literature, geography, and religion.

== See also ==
- List of libraries in Afghanistan
