= Abul Fazl Shrine =

Shia shrine and mosque in Kabul, Afghanistan

- زیارت ابوالفضل
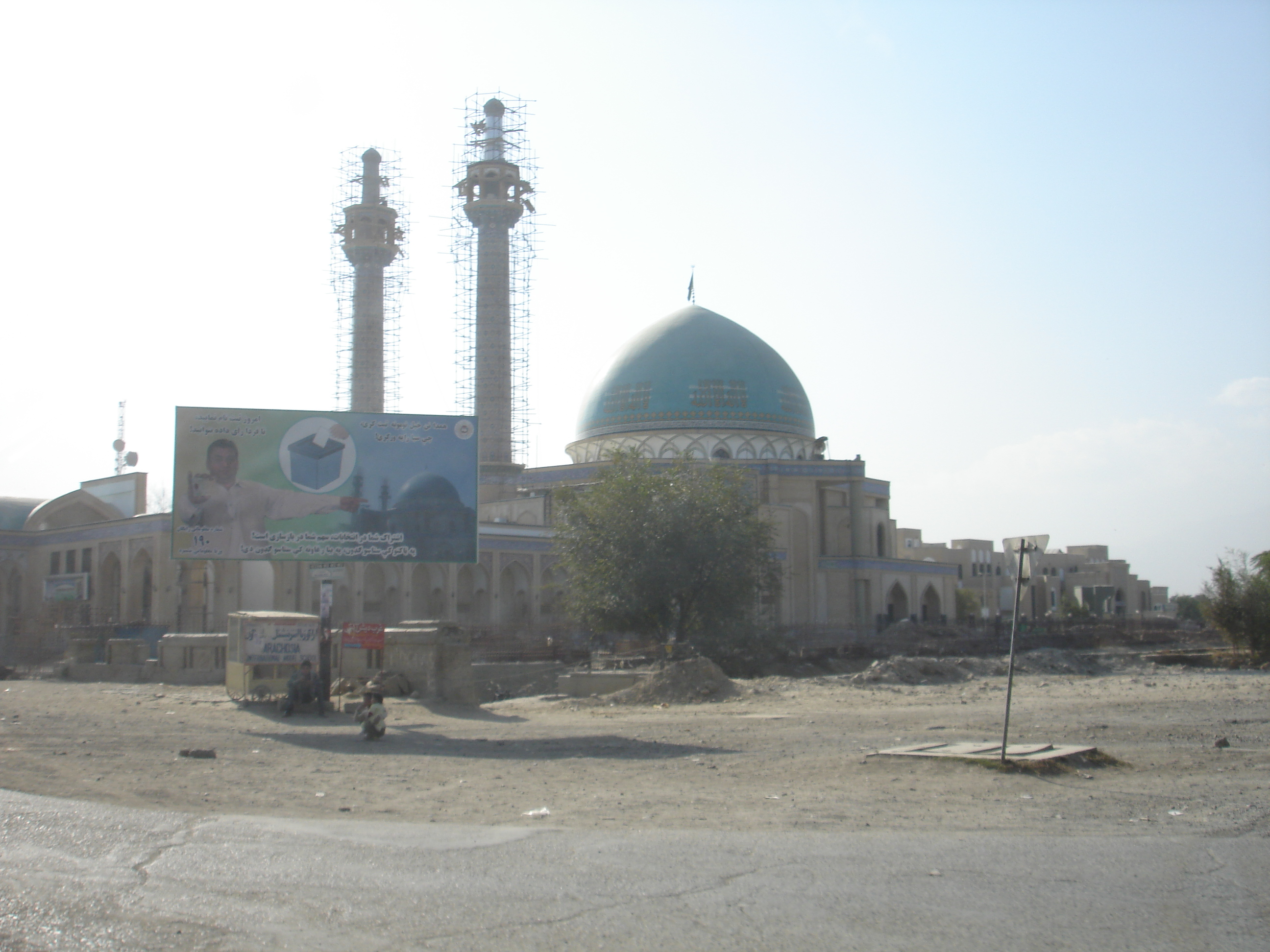
- The shrine in 2008, during construction

- Location of the shrine in Afghanistan

Religion
- Affiliation: Shia Islam
- Festival: Ashura
- Ecclesiastical or organizational status: Shrine and mosque
- Status: Active

Location
- Location: Murad Khane, Kabul, Kabul Region
- Country: Afghanistan
- Interactive map of Abul Fazl Shrine
- Coordinates: 34°31′08″N 69°10′59″E

Architecture
- Style: Islamic
- Completed: c. 2010 CE

Specifications
- Dome: One
- Minaret: Two
- Shrine: One: (Abul Fazl)

The Abul Fazl Shrine (Pashto/Dari: زیارت ابوالفضل) is a Shi'ite Islamic shrine and mosque, located in Murad Khane, Kabul, Afghanistan. The mosque-shrine complex is named in honour of Abu'l-Fazl ibn Mubarak, a Grand Vizier of the 16th-century Mughal emperor Akbar (r. 1556 – 1605).

== Incidents ==
On 6 December 2011, as a part of the 2011 Afghanistan Ashura bombings, a suicide bomber killed an estimated 70 people, including women and children, at the mosque during an unprecedented wave of violence against minority Shi'ites in Afghanistan. The building was packed with people celebrating Ashura, an important Shia Muslim holiday which marks the death of Hussein, the grandson of the prophet Muhammad, in the battle of Karbala in Iraq in 680 CE. Other attacks took place on the same day at Mazar-e-Sharif, killing four people, and in Kandahar, where five people were injured. The fatalities were estimated to have totalled 74 people, with more than 160 people injured. The Pakistan-based Lashkar-e-Jhangvi claimed responsibility for the attacks.

On 21 February 2023 the mosque-shrine complex was hit with a massive blast; however, there were no casualties.

== See also ==
- Shia Islam in Afghanistan
- List of mosques in Afghanistan
