= List of libraries in Afghanistan =

This is a list of major libraries in Afghanistan.

== Libraries ==
- Afghanistan Center at Kabul University (ACKU), known as the National Library of Afghanistan
- Afghanistan Research and Evaluation Unit (AREU) Library
- Bernice Nachman Marlowe Library at the American University of Afghanistan (AUAF)
- Amir Khusrou Balkhi Library
- Kabul Public Library
- Kitab Khana-ye Melli
- Library of the National Bank
- Library of the Press and Information Department
- Ministry of Education Library
- National Library of Afghanistan
- Dehkada Library, Ghor
- Nazo Annah Library

== See also ==
- Education in Afghanistan
- List of museums in Afghanistan
