= Eidgah Mosque =

Mosque in Kabul, Afghanistan

- مسجد عید‌گاه
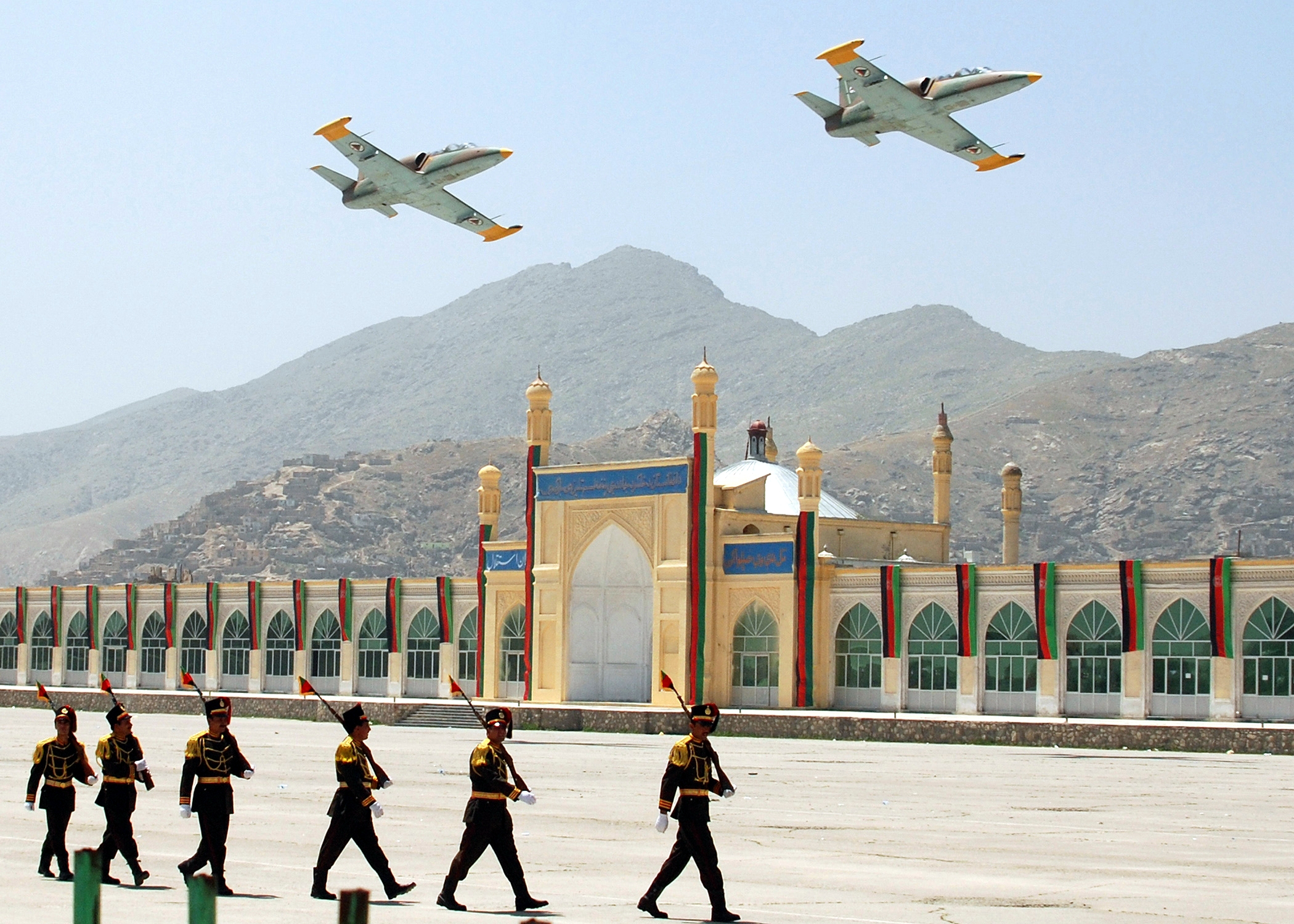
- The mosque during a 2007 military parade

- Location of the mosque in Afghanistan

Religion
- Affiliation: Sunni Islam
- Ecclesiastical or organisational status: Mosque
- Leadership: Abdur Rahman Khan
- Status: Active

Location
- Location: Kabul, Kabul District, Kabul Province
- Country: Afghanistan
- Interactive map of Eidgah Mosque
- Coordinates: 34°31′04″N 69°11′24″E

Architecture
- Type: Mosque
- Style: Islamic architecture (Afghan and Mughal architecture)
- Founder: Emir Abdur Rahman Khan
- Completed: early 20th century

Specifications
- Dome: One (maybe more)
- Minaret: One (maybe more)

The Eidgah Mosque (Dari: مسجد عید‌گاه; Pashto: د عیدګاه جومات); also spelled as the Id Gah Mosque, is a Sunni mosque located in Kabul, Afghanistan. It is located to the southeast of the affluent Wazir Akbar Khan neighborhood, near the Ghazi Stadium and Chaman-e-Hozori. It was built during the late 19th century and early 20th century, when the country was ruled by Emir Abdur Rahman Khan and his son Habibullah Khan. The mosque is a tourist attraction in Kabul.

The mosque was used by large crowds of daily prayers, including during the special annual Eid al-Fitr and Eid al-Adha prayers. It was the scene of religious festivals and special ceremonies, such as coronations, funerals, parades, and various other state functions attended by top government officials. It was from this mosque that King Amanullah Khan made an announcement of his country's full independence in 1919.

== History ==
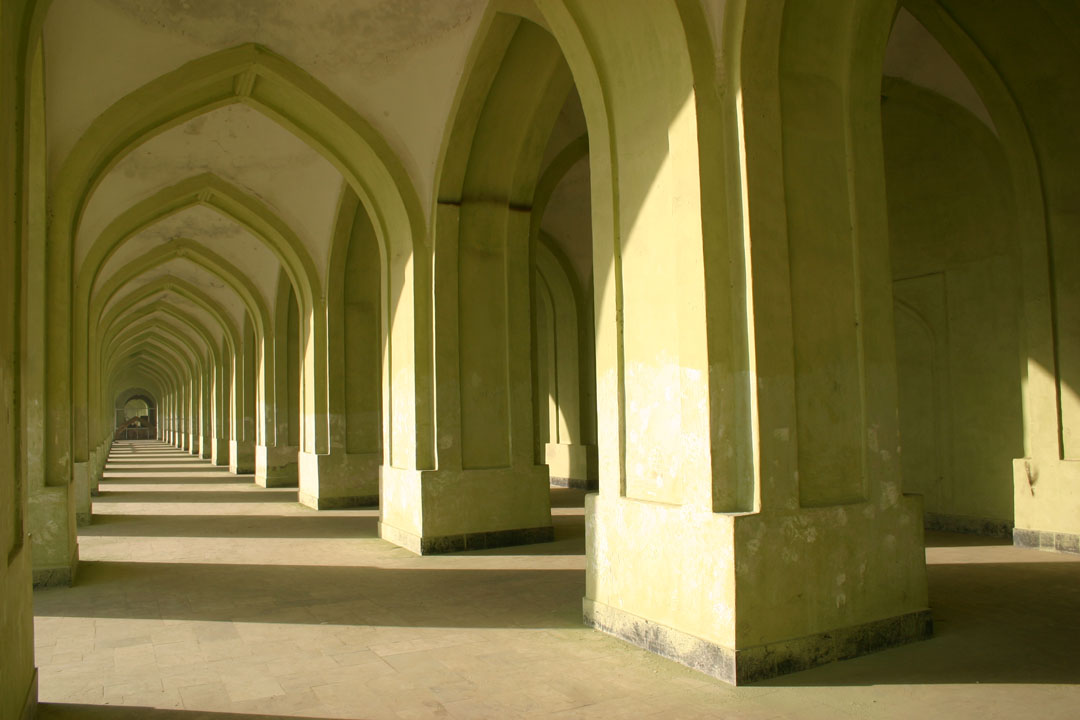
Interior of the mosque in 2006.

Construction of the Eidgah Mosque in Kabul initiated sometime before the death of Emir Abdur Rahman Khan in 1901. It was completed by his son Habibullah Khan. Afghan history records indicate that in 1901, the then Emir of Afghanistan, Habibullah Khan, publicly performed the priestly functions by celebrating the Eid ul-Fitr at Eidgah Mosque. The chief priest of Kabul immediately proclaimed Habibullah to be the successor of his father, whereupon he delivered an address inspired by an "intolerant ecclesiasticism". Among other things the Emir passed a dictum that a fine of up to ten Kabuli Rupees would be levied on all who did not offer prayers in the mosques. A register of the daily attendance of all individuals was to be kept in various places and a “box of justice” was to be kept into which secret reports could be dropped reporting on people who had not obeyed this dictum of compulsory attendance for religious prayers at the mosques.

In 1914–15, the bitter feud between British-India and Afghanistan assumed the proportions of a holy war or jihad, even though Emir Habibullah had initially opposed this approach of the mullahs. After his ascension to the throne in 1919, King Amanullah Khan aligned with the mullahs to attack British-Indian military camps. Before he launched a war on May 15, 1919, King Amanullah made a speech at the Eidgah Mosque urging his countrymen to wage jihad against the British-Indians. After the Third Anglo-Afghan War, on August 19, 1919, King Amanullah announced Afghanistan's independence from this mosque.

The mosque was renovated between 2018 and 2019. Most of its outdoor space is now a park. On 3 October 2021 an attack by the Islamic State – Khorasan Province killed several people near one of the mosque's gates. The target of the attack was senior Taliban officials.

== See also ==
- Islam in Afghanistan
- List of mosques in Afghanistan
- Tourism in Afghanistan
