= Mosque of the Hair of the Prophet =

Mosque in Kandahar, Afghanistan

- Location of the mosque in Afghanistan

Religion
- Affiliation: Islam
- Ecclesiastical or organisational status: Mosque
- Status: Active

Location
- Location: Kandahar, Kandahar Province
- Country: Afghanistan
- Interactive map of Mosque of the Hair of the Prophet
- Coordinates: 31°36′49″N 65°42′38″E

Architecture
- Type: Mosque
- Founder: Kohendil Khan
- Completed: 19th century CE

The Mosque of the Hair of the Prophet, also known as Jame Mui Mobarak, is a mosque located near the Kabul Bazaar, in the city of Kandahar, Afghanistan.

The mosque was built in the 19th century by Kohendil Khan. A canal runs through the mosque's shaded courtyard. At one point, a traveler's rest house was located in the mosque's grounds.

The hair of Muhammad contained in the mosque was brought to Kandahar at the same time that the cloak of Muhammad was brought to the Mosque of the Cloak of the Prophet Mohammed. The hair is kept in a side chapel in a golden sheath in a casket piled over with holy blankets and banners.

Maulavi Khattib, the caretaker of the mosque, is one of the senior members of the Kandahar Ulema-u-Shura, or Cleric's Council.

== See also ==
- Islam in Afghanistan
- List of mosques in Afghanistan
