= City Park, Kabul =

Amusement park in Kabul, Afghanistan

City Park
- پارک شهر د ښار پارک
- Interactive map of City Park
- Location: Kabul, Afghanistan
- Coordinates: 34°30′40″N 69°09′45″E
- Area: 24 acres (9.7 ha)
- Elevation: 1,804 m (5,919 ft)
- Created: Mufkora
- Founder: Kabul Municipality
- Open: 2014
- Status: Active
- Plants: Yes
- Species: Pine, weeping, shrub, flower

The City Park (Dari: پارک شهر; Pashto: د ښار پارک), also called the Kabul City Park, is an amusement park located in the center of Kabul, Afghanistan, next to the Kabul Zoo and not far from the Gardens of Babur. It was built by a private company through Kabul Municipality and opened to the public in October 2014. It became the first such park in Kabul.

The amusement park covers about 24 acres of land and has various rides, including a Ferris wheel, drop tower, evolution, jump and smile, skydiver, octopus, carousel and bumper cars. There is also an arcade game room and a restaurant called Marhaba inside the park. The Kam Air McDonnell Douglas MD-87 passenger jet in front of the park is part of the restaurant. It was added to the park in 2017 and people can eat inside it.

The park was temporarily closed as a result of the COVID-19 pandemic but reopened on 3 September 2020 after the easing of restrictions. After the Taliban takeover, some members of the Taliban were reported to be visiting the park to enjoy themselves.

On 8 May 2022, women were prevented from entering the park after the Taliban banned local women from entering the park on Eid al-Fitr. On 10 November 2022, the ban was extended to all parks regardless of the time. The ban on women does not apply to women in possession of passports of other countries.

== See also ==
- Habibullah Zazai Park
- Tourism in Afghanistan
