= Deh Afghanan =

Deh Afghanan ده افغانان
- Neighborhood of Kabul
- Coordinates: 34°52′N 69°18′E
- Country: Afghanistan
- Province: Kabul

Deh Afghanan (Pashto/Persian: ده افغانان, meaning Village of the Afghans) is a downtown settlement in the center of Kabul, Afghanistan. It forms part of administrative District 2. It was once a small Pashtun village that spread across the Zarnegar Park open space, which was home of the Zarnegar Palace built under Emir Abdur Rahman Khan around the early 1900s. Today Zarnegar Park is the largest urban park in downtown Kabul and contains a mausoleum of Abdur Rahman. Deh Afghanan is one of the city's main commercial districts and is home to the municipality headquarters, several ministry buildings, banks, the Serena Hotel, and the Arg. In 2009 the Abdul Rahman Mosque was completed and opened in the area. It also contains a mix of historic housing next to modern business buildings.
