= List of mosques in Afghanistan =

The following is an incomplete list of large mosques in Afghanistan:

Name	Image	Province	City	Year (CE)	Remarks
Haji Piyada Mosque		Balkh	Near Balkh	c. 8th-9th century	In partial ruins
Green Mosque, Balkh		Balkh	Balkh	1421	Mausoleum and mosque, built during Timurid period
Shrine of Khwaja Abd Allah and mosque		Herat	Gazur Gah, Herat	1425	Mausoleum, shrine, and mosque, built during Timurid period
Gawhar Shad Mosque		Herat	Herat	1438	Part of the Musalla complex, built during Timurid period. Partially destroyed in 1885; in a partial ruinous state
Great Mosque of Herat		Herat	Herat	1446	The city's first congregational mosque, built during Timurid period on the former site of two smaller Zoroastrian Fire temples that were destroyed by earthquake and fire
Blue Mosque		Balkh	Mazar-i-Sharif	1480	The largest mosque in the province, also built during Timurid period
Friday Mosque of Kandahar		Kandahar	Kandahar	1750	Houses the cloak of Muhammad, an Islamic prophet
Pul-e Khishti Mosque		Kabul	Kabul	18th century	The largest mosque in Kabul
Mosque of the Hair of the Prophet		Kandahar	Kandahar	19th century	
Khost Mosque		Khost	Khost	2000	The largest mosque in the province
Abdul Rahman Mosque		Kabul	Kabul	2009	One of the largest mosques in Kabul
Abul Fazl Mosque		Kabul	Murad Khane, Kabul	c. 2010	Shrine and mosque
Omar Al-Farooq Mosque		Kandahar	Kandahar	2014	One of the largest mosques in Kandahar
Amir Ali Shernway Mosque		Jowzjan	Sheberghan	2017	The largest mosque in Jowzjan province. Built by Turkey
Imam Bargah Mosque		Kandahar	Kandahar		Scene of the 2021 Kandahar bombing
Gozar-e-Sayed Abad Mosque		Kunduz	Kunduz		Scene of the 2021 Kunduz mosque bombing
Gaza Mosque		Kabul	Kabul	2025	
Hajji Dunya Gul Niazi Jamia Masjid		Laghman	Mihtarlam		
Mosque of Jalalabad		Nangarhar	Jalalabad		One of the largest mosques in the province
Lashkargah Mosque		Helmand	Lashkar Gah		One of the largest mosques in the province
Red Mosque		Kandahar	Kandahar		
Sakhi Shrine		Kabul	Kabul		Also known as Karte Sakhi Shrine

== See also ==
- Islam in Afghanistan
- Lists of mosques
