= Omar Al-Farooq Mosque =

Mosque in Kandahar, Afghanistan

- Location of the mosque in Afghanistan

Religion
- Affiliation: Sunni Islam
- Ecclesiastical or organizational status: Friday mosque
- Status: Active

Location
- Location: Kandahar, Kandahar Province
- Country: Afghanistan
- Interactive map of Omar Al-Farooq Mosque
- Coordinates: 31°36′37″N 65°42′05″E

Architecture
- Type: Mosque
- Style: Islamic
- Founder: Mullah Omar
- Groundbreaking: 2010
- Completed: 2014

Specifications
- Dome: 1
- Minaret: 4

The Omar Al-Farooq Mosque, also known as Jame Omer Masque, is a Sunni Friday mosque, located in Kandahar, Afghanistan. It is located next to Shahidaan Chowk (Martyrs' Square).

The mosque was originally planned by Mullah Omar in the late 1990s. Construction began in 2010 and the mosque was completed in 2014, except its four minarets which remained unfinished.

== See also ==
- Islam in Afghanistan
- List of mosques in Afghanistan
