= List of museums in Afghanistan =

This is a list of museums in Afghanistan by city.

Key
- Archaeological
- Industrial
- Art Museum
- Cultural
- Historic Site
- History (General)
- Military History
- Library
- Biographical
- Hall of Fame
- Defunct

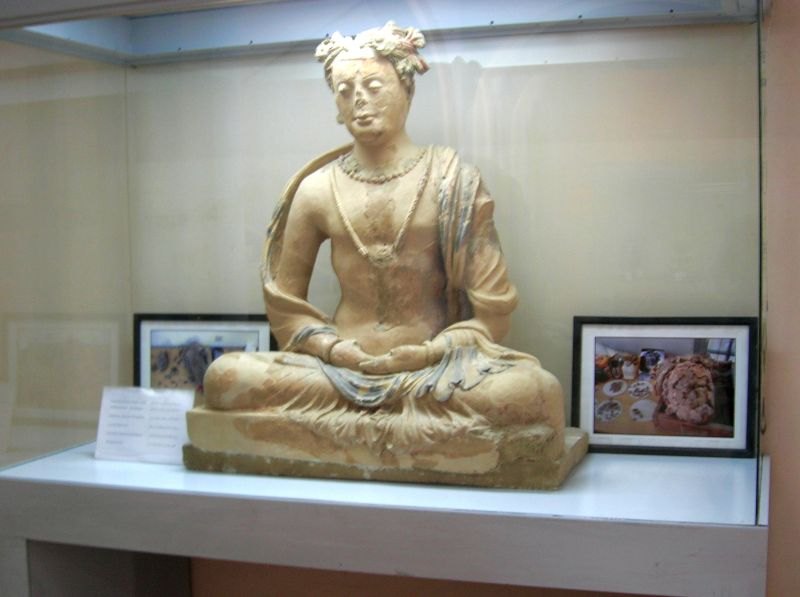
A statue in the Kabul National Museum

== Ghazni ==
- Museum of Islamic Art

== Hadda ==
- Nangarhar Provincial Museum

== Herat ==
- Herat National Museum
- Jihad Museum

== Kabul ==
- National Museum of Afghanistan
- OMAR Mine Museum

== Kandahar ==
- Kandahar Provincial Museum

== Mazari Sharif ==
- Balkh Provincial Museum

== See also ==
- List of libraries in Afghanistan
