= Ahmad Shah Baba Mina =

Ahmad Shah Baba Mina احمدشاه بابا مېنه
- Neighborhood
- Coordinates: 34.511948°N 69.329138°E
- Country: Afghanistan
- Province: Kabul

Ahmad Shah Baba Mina (Pashto: احمدشاه بابا مېنه), formerly known as Arzan Qimat (ارزان قیمت), is a neighborhood in far eastern Kabul (District 12), nearby the Pul-e-Charkhi prison. Formerly a village, the area has become a modern township with new buildings, an asphalt way and many markets and shops. It is named after Ahmad Shah Durrani, founder of Afghanistan. Downtown Kabul is about 13 km away.

== History ==
This project was ready for distribution by the Municipal Office in Kabul and the Afghanistan Central Council of Trade Unions in 1983. The project was for sale just to the Afghan government poor workers and employees. The price of each 180 m^{2} was 2.5 US dollars (5200 Afghanis). In 1983, it was just a hostile patch of desert but was then turned into a new town. Today, it is covered by countless recently constructed mud-brick houses, interspersed with the private villas of venturesome repatriates. As of 2019, the area has relatively good infrastructure and sought after by middle-class residents, although it is somewhat secluded from downtown Kabul. It is mainly populated by ethnic Pashtuns from the provinces east of Kabul.

== Services ==
Most informal residents did not have electricity until 2008. Water supply is provided to the new developments but others access underground water by a pump or by other methods.
