= Turquoise Mountain Foundation =

UK non-governmental organization

The Turquoise Mountain Foundation is a non-governmental organization legally established in Scotland. It takes its name from Turquoise Mountain and initially focused on the enhancement of the Afghanistan craft industry. The organization subsequently expanded its work to the Levant, Saudi Arabia, and Myanmar (Burma).

== History and activities ==
Turquoise Mountain was founded in 2006 by King Charles III (then the Prince of Wales) in partnership with President of Afghanistan Hamid Karzai, and British writer, academic and former politician Rory Stewart, a former Conservative member of Parliament. Stewart was executive chairman of the foundation from 2005 to 2008; the current president is his wife Shoshana Stewart.

Among the charity's projects was the Turquoise Mountain Institute for Afghan Arts and Architecture, a school for the study of traditional Afghan calligraphy, ceramics, woodworking and jewelry-making. Many of the Institute's graduates are Afghan women. Turquoise Mountain also largely funded a major restoration project in Murad Khane, the old town of Kabul, encompassing the restoration of over 150 buildings in the neighborhood.

The group describes its mission as "to preserve and regenerate historic areas and communities with a rich cultural heritage and to revive traditional crafts, to create jobs, skills and a renewed sense of pride." Funding has been provided by a number of public and private donors from both the West and Middle East, including the United States Agency for International Development (USAID), Canadian International Development Agency (CIDA), the Government of Afghanistan, the Government of India, the Blue Moon Fund, Reach Out To Asia, the Kathy Evans Afghan Education Trust, The Bonita Trust, The Prince's Charities, The Kingdom of Bahrain, the Amir of Kuwait, the Alwaleed Bin Talal Foundation (Saudi Arabia) and the British Council.

The scene in British film-maker Adam Curtis's 2015 documentary Bitter Lake of an English art teacher enthusiastically extolling the meaning of Marcel Duchamp’s conceptual artwork, Fountain, an inverted male urinal, to a group of recently liberated and incredulous Afghan women, is held to have occurred under the auspices of the Turquoise Mountain Foundation.

In 2019, the Turquoise Mountain Foundation took over the activities of Arzu - Studios of Hope in Afghanistan. Arzu received a Skoll Award in 2008.

In 2021 it was announced that former ABC Carpet & Home president Graham Head had joined the bosrd of trustees. Then in 2023, it was announced that Princess Dana Firas was joining as a trustee.

== Alumni ==
- Samira Kitman
