= Jihad Museum =

Museum in Herat, Afghanistan

The Jihad Museum is located in the western provincial capital of Herat in Afghanistan. It was built in 2010 as a place for Afghans to understand past conflicts and their history. Since its opening, the museum has welcomed many visitors, including U.S. congressmen and the deputy commander of NATO forces in Afghanistan. The museum seeks to inform visitors of the mujahideen's plight and to educate Afghans. It is a memorial to the mujahideen heroes who fought the Soviets in the 70s and 80s as well as to the Afghans who lost their lives fighting.

== Architecture ==
The museum is designed as a blue, green and white rotunda. The outside of the building is inscribed with some of the names of victims of the war, both men and women. There are also several poems dedicated to martyrs covering the rotunda. Located in a park on a hilltop, the Jihad Museum is surrounded by a garden with flowers and fountains.

== Exhibitions ==
The Jihad Museum contains several exhibitions that are open continuously and deal with various topics pertaining to the mujahideen battles against the Soviets.

- Weapons: The museum exhibits Soviet weapons used during the war such as tanks, a fighter jet, a helicopter and a light rocket launcher. There is also a large collection of Russian rifles, grenades and plastic land mines on display.
- Portrait Hall of Fame: The portrait hall of fame displays portraits of over 60 commanders who fought the Soviets.
- Diorama: Using a graphic diorama, this exhibit enables visitors to see how villagers raised up against Soviet soldiers. The stages of battles end in a mujahideen victory.
- Mural: The mural is located in a large circular room in the museum. It depicts important events in Afghan history, including the different stages of the 1979 uprising of Afghans against the Soviet-supported government around Herat.

As part of the Taliban's ban on the depiction of living images, the faces of the museum's figurines were removed of their features, while the heads of animals were covered in plaster following the Taliban takeover in 2021.

== Contribution to historical discourse ==
Afghanistan has been in conflict for decades but there has rarely been a place for citizens to reflect on the events of war and how it has affected them. As many Afghans have not received a formal education, they don't necessarily know why their ancestors fought against the Soviets. School texts tend to stop at the 1970s as to not aggravate tensions. The exhibits depict the brutality and human effects of war through the murals, diorama and inscription of names surrounding the rotunda. This message of the horror of war permeates the museum. The creators were careful to depoliticize the exhibits by not depicting the jihadist battles that followed the war with the Soviets. Visitors can ponder how they want their history to progress following the end of the NATO combat mission in 2014.

== See also ==
- List of museums in Afghanistan
