= Herat National Museum =

Museum in Herat, Afghanistan

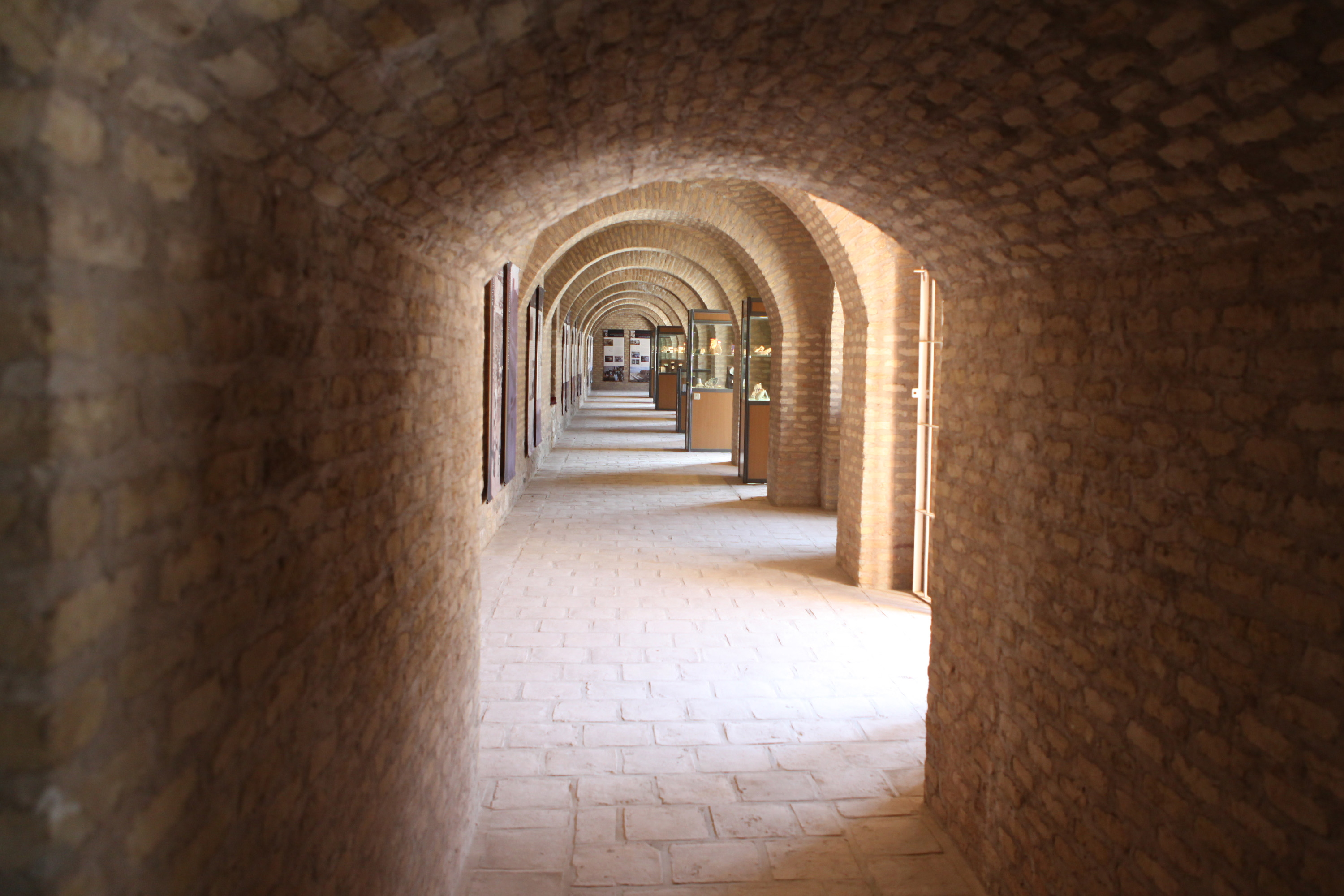
- The new museum in the Qala Iktyaruddin Citadel in Herat, Afghanistan.
- Established: 1925
- Location: Herat, Afghanistan
- Coordinates: 34°20′45″N 62°11′17″E

The Herat National Museum is a museum located in Herat, Afghanistan. It was established in 1925 by order of Emir Amānullāh.

== See also ==
- List of museums in Afghanistan
