= Khost Mosque =

Mosque in Khost, Afghanistan

- د خوست لوی جماعت
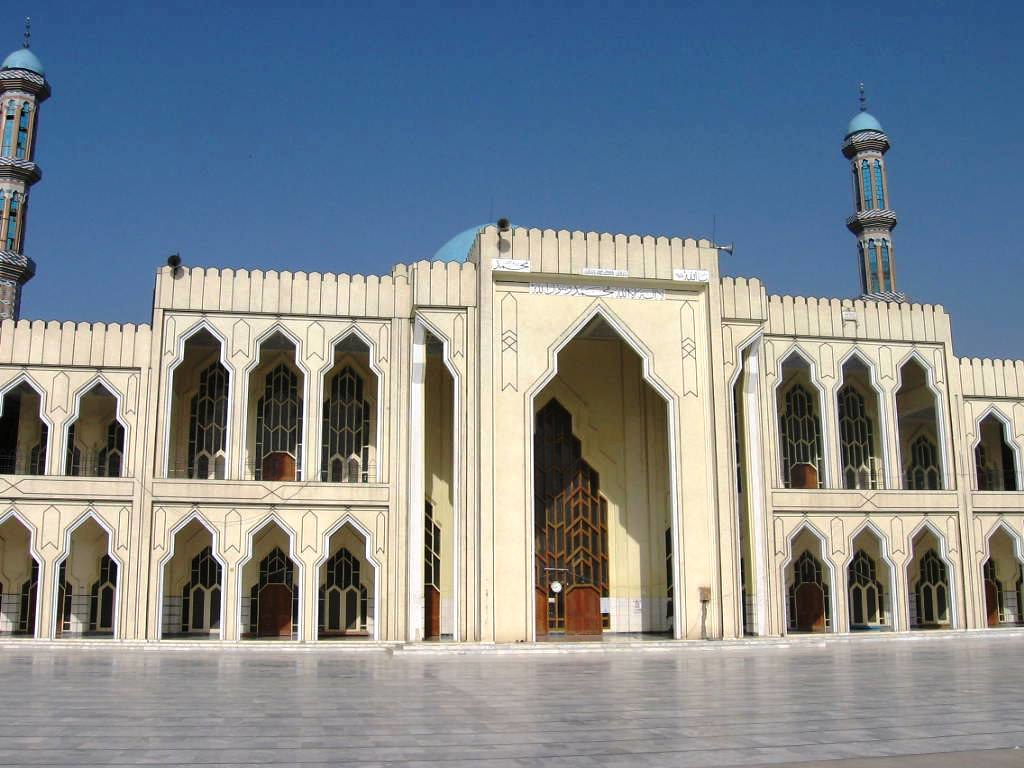
- The mosque in 2007

- Location of the mosque in Afghanistan

Religion
- Affiliation: Islam
- Ecclesiastical or organizational status: Mosque
- Status: Active

Location
- Location: Khost
- Country: Afghanistan
- Interactive map of Khost Mosque
- Coordinates: 33°20′21″N 69°55′1″E

Architecture
- Type: Mosque

Specifications
- Capacity: 2,000 worshipers
- Minaret: Two

The Great Mosque of Khost (Pashto: د خوست لوی جماعت), or simply the Khost Mosque, is the largest mosque in the city of Khost, in southeastern Afghanistan. It can hold up to 2,000 worshipers during any prayer.

The city of Khost has a number of other smaller mosques, including the Yaqoubi Mosque that was attacked in May 2018, caused by explosives left in the mosque.

== See also ==
- Islam in Afghanistan
- List of mosques in Afghanistan
