= Union council =

Union council may refer to:

- Union Council of Ministers, a government body in India
- Union council (Bangladesh), an administrative unit in Bangladesh
- Union council (Pakistan), an administrative unit in Pakistan
- Union Council (students' union), an administrative body in a students' union
- Union Council, a former council with the BSA

== See also ==
- Union of Councils for Soviet Jews
