= Abdul Rahman Mosque =

Mosque in Kabul, Afghanistan

- مسجد عبدالرحمان
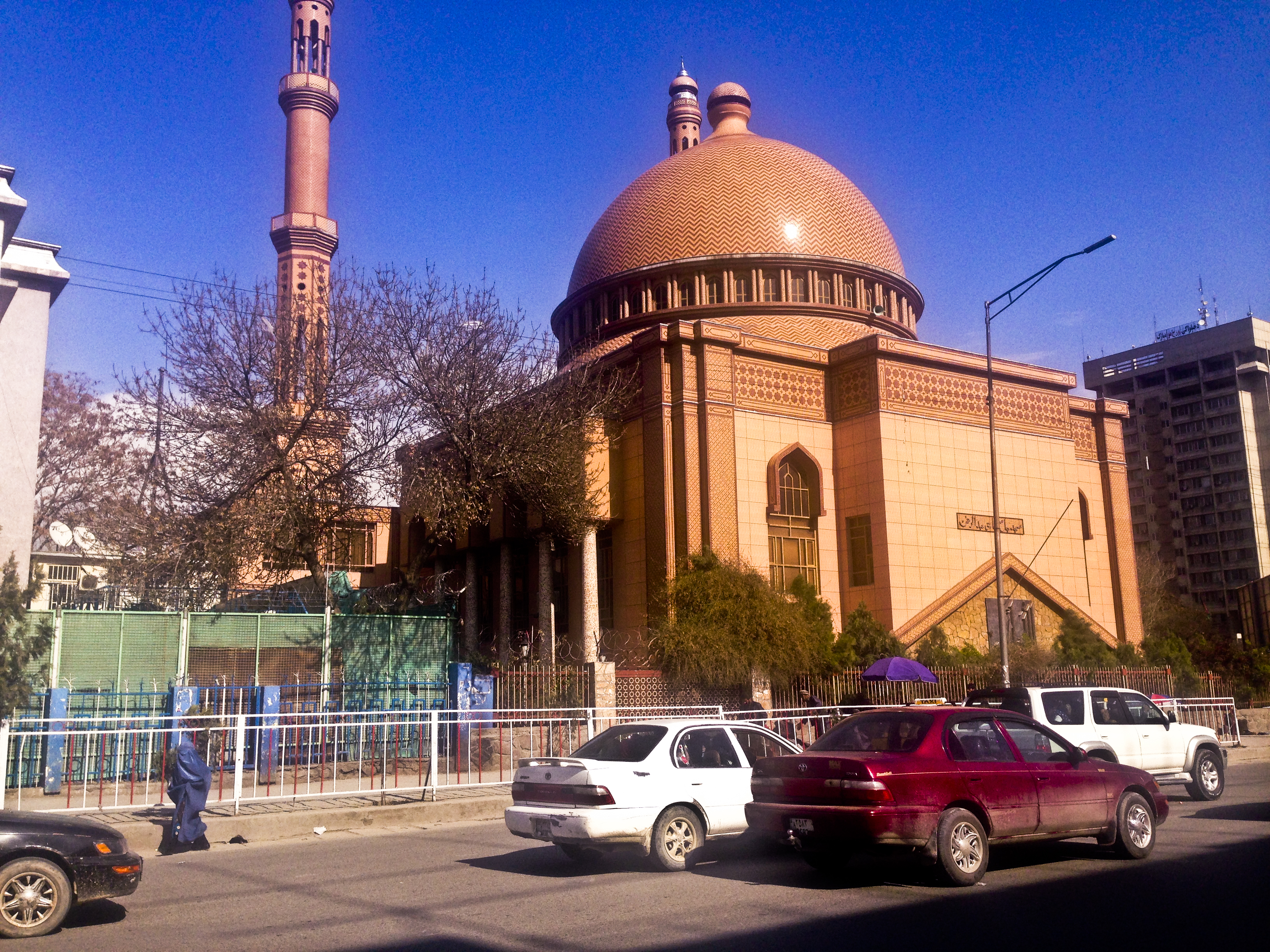
- The mosque in 2018

- Location of the mosque in Afghanistan

Religion
- Affiliation: Sunni Islam
- Ecclesiastical or organizational status: Congregational mosque, madrasa, and library
- Status: Active

Location
- Location: Kabul
- Country: Afghanistan
- Interactive map of Abdul Rahman Mosque
- Coordinates: 34°31′15″N 69°10′29″E

Architecture
- Architect: Mir Hafizullah Hashimi
- Type: Mosque
- Style: Islamic
- Founder: Hajji Abdul Rahman
- Groundbreaking: 2001
- Completed: 2009

Specifications
- Capacity: 10,000 worshippers
- Dome: 19
- Minaret: 2
- Site area: 1.4 ha (3.5 acres)

The Abdul Rahman Mosque (Pashto: د عبدالرحمان جومات; Dari: مسجد عبدالرحمان), also known as the Grand Mosque of Kabul, is a Sunni Congregational mosque, located in the central commercial area of Deh Afghanan, in Kabul, Afghanistan. One of the largest mosques in Afghanistan, it is located in one of Kabul's central commercial areas called Deh Afghanan, near the Pashtunistan Square, Zarnegar Park, near the once popular Plaza Hotel. The building is three stories high, built on 1.4 hectares (3.5 acres) of land. One floor of the building is dedicated to women only.

== Overview ==
The mosque is named after an influential Afghan businessman named Hajji Abdul Rahman who died but the project was continued by his sons. Construction of the mosque began in 2001 by Hajji Abdur Rahman but was delayed for several years due to red tape. The mosque has the capacity to serve 10,000 people at a time. There is also a madrasa inside the mosque and a library containing 150,000 books.

The major work on the mosque was completed in late 2009 and the official inauguration took place in July 2012, attended by the former Afghan President Hamid Karzai and many other high-ranking officials. The mosque is said to have been initially designed by Mir Hafizullah Hashimi, an Afghan architect.

== Architecture & Construction Specifics ==
The Abdul Rahman Mosque, also known as the Grand Mosque of Kabul, is one of the largest mosques in Afghanistan and a prominent religious landmark in Kabul. Construction of the mosque began in 2001, initiated and financed by Afghan businessman Hajji Abdul Rahman. Following Rahman’s death in 2002, responsibility for the project was assumed by his sons, and construction continued over several years. Major structural work was completed in 2009, and the mosque was officially inaugurated in July 2012. The inauguration ceremony was attended by then-President Hamid Karzai and other Afghan officials. The mosque’s construction took place during a period of post-2001 reconstruction and urban expansion in Kabul. Scholarly analyses of mosque development in Afghanistan describe a broader resurgence in mosque construction during this period, often privately funded and designed to serve expanding urban populations. Studies of mosque development in Muslim societies note that large congregational mosques frequently function not only as places of worship but also as centers for education and community activity.

Architecturally, the Abdul Rahman Mosque reflects a combination of traditional Islamic design elements and contemporary construction practices characteristic of late-20th- and early-21st-century mosque architecture in Kabul. The mosque is a three-story structure designed to accommodate approximately 10,000 worshippers. One floor is designated for women’s prayer, reflecting modern planning considerations within large congregational mosques. The structure incorporates multiple domes and tall minarets, consistent with established Islamic architectural traditions. Academic studies of mosque architecture in Kabul note that contemporary mosques frequently combine classical features—such as domes, arches, and Quranic calligraphy—with reinforced concrete construction and modern structural systems. In addition to its prayer halls, the mosque houses a library containing approximately 150,000 volumes, serving educational and scholarly functions.

== See also ==
- Islam in Afghanistan
- List of mosques in Afghanistan
