= Sanglakh Valley =

Sanglākh Darah-ye Sanglākh سنگلاخ
- Valley
- Location in Afghanistan
- Coordinates: 34.47246°N 68.64487°E
- Country: Afghanistan
- Province: Maidan Wardak
- Time zone: + 4.30

Sanglākh (Dari: سنگلاخ) is a valley in Afghanistan located in the province of Maidan Wardak, in the central part of the country.

== See also ==
- Valleys of Afghanistan
