= Central Council of Trade Unions =

- Founded: 1921
- Dissolved: 1928
- Location: Persia
- Members: 8,000 (1924)
- Affiliations: Profintern

Central Council of Workers Unions (Persian: شورای متحده اتحادیه کارگران) was an organization of trade unions in Persia. The organization was founded in 1921 by the Communist Party of Persia and socialists. The Central Council became the most important mass organization of the Communist Party at the time. Nine unions took part in the founding of the organization; unions organizing textile mill workers (at the sole modern textile mill in Tehran), tailors, municipal employees, construction workers, bakery assistants, bath attendants, shoemakers, pharmacists and printers. In the year of its foundation the Central Council began publishing a workers newspaper, Haqiqat ('Truth'), as its main organ. The Central Council was affiliated to the Red International of Labour Unions ('Profintern').

Significantly, a major share of the workers and employees organized by the Central Council were Azeris or Armenians.

The teachers union and the union of post and telecommunications employees later affiliated themselves to the organization. May Day was celebrated for the first time in Iran in 1922. The May Day rallies of the organization held in Tehran gathered more than 2,000 participants. The Central Council grew in strength, and by 1924 it counted 8,000 members. The organization assisted the setting up of an additional 21 trade unions across the country; in Tehran (cooks, domestic servants, tobacco workers, carpenters, carriage drivers, carpet weavers), Mashad (teachers, tailors, shoemakers, office employees, carpet weavers, confectioners, telegraphers), Rasht (rice cleaners, tobacco workers, porters, teachers), oil workers in the south-west, Isfahan (textile workers), Kerman (carpet weavers) and Enzeli (dockers).

In 1928 the government banned all trade unions.
