= Museum of Islamic Art, Ghazni =

Museum in Rauza, Ghazni, Afghanistan

Museum of Islamic Art
- Established: 1966
- Location: Rauza, Ghazni, Afghanistan
- Type: museum

The Museum of Islamic Art is a museum located in Ghazni, Afghanistan. It is located in Rauza, a suburb of Ghazni. The museum was first opened by the Italian Archaeological Mission in 1966 in the restored sixteenth-century Mausoleum of Abd al-Razzaq to display artifacts of the Islamic period. Work was halted during the war with the Soviet Union after the building sustained damage. Restoration work was undertaken in 2004–2007.

== See also ==
- List of museums in Afghanistan
