= Nangarhar Provincial Museum =

Museum in Hadda, Afghanistan

The Nangarhar Provincial Museum is a museum located in Hadda, Afghanistan.

== See also ==
- List of museums in Afghanistan
