= Zarnegar Park =

Park in Kabul, Afghanistan

Coordinates: 34°52′11″N 69°17′55″E

- زرنگار پارک پارک زرنگار
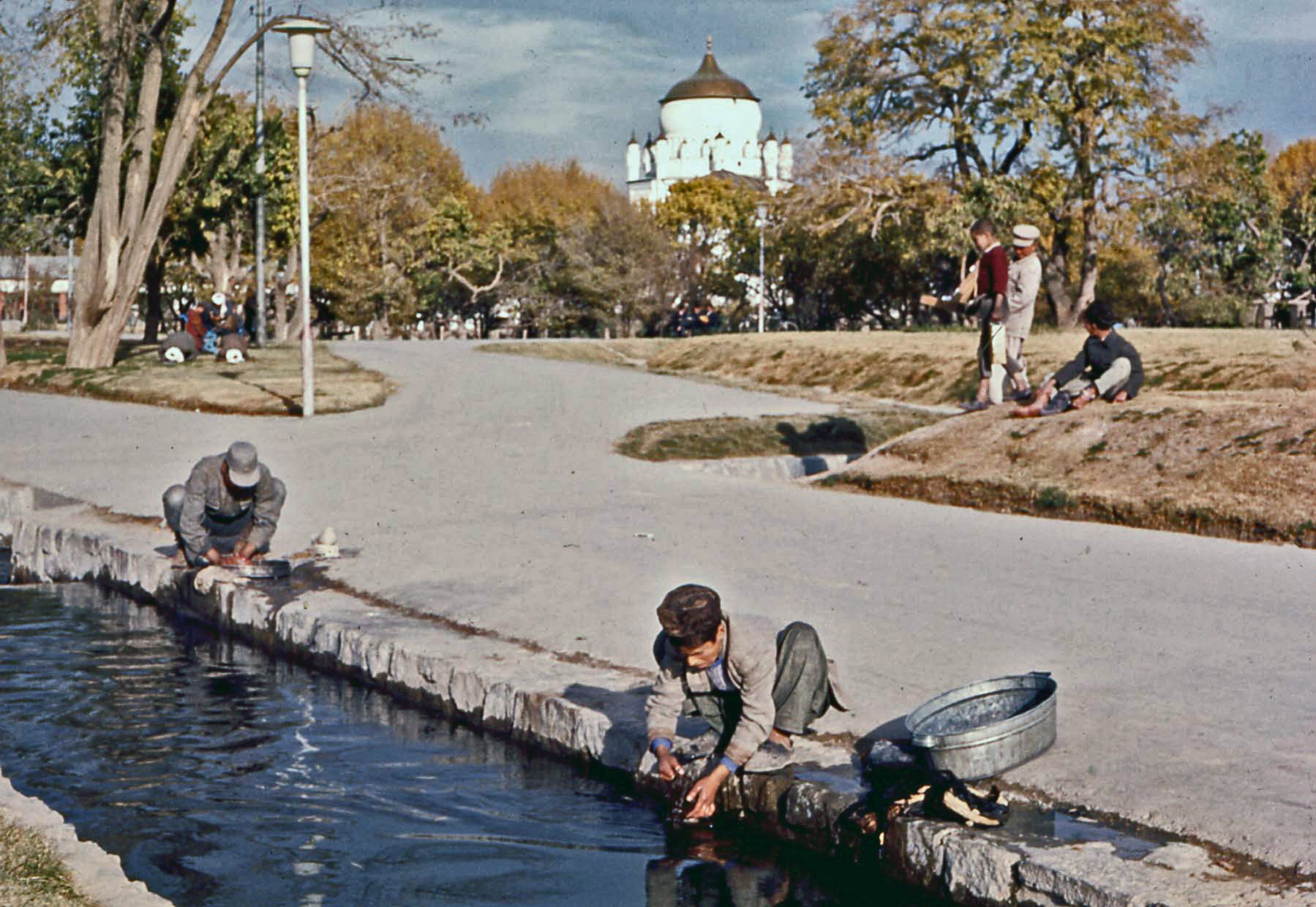
- Inside the park (1966)
- Interactive map of Zarnegar Park
- Location: Kabul, Afghanistan
- Area: 63,123 m^{2} (15.60 acres; 6.31 ha)
- Status: Active

Zarnegar Park (Note: Pashto: زرنگار پارک Dari: پارک زرنگار) is an urban park in the center of Kabul, Afghanistan, north of the river. The park, a popular landmark, has a green hill in its center with trees and decorated with flowers. A large pavilion is located in the park which serves as Abdur Rahman Khan's resting place.

== History ==
The park itself was developed in the late 1950s after the government's demolishing of several state owned buildings at the site. About 50 million afghanis were spent on developing the park, in a very central location of the city. The name "Zarnegar" (Dari: زرنگار, meaning adorned with gold) is taken from the pavilion that existed here since the 19th century.

The park became a very popular hotspot for civilians and local students who would meet and relax on the grass and benches. Soldiers from the garrison would also often come here, listening to Radio Afghanistan's public address system.

In more recent years, the park has been a popular place used by protestors and campaigners.

== Mausoleum ==
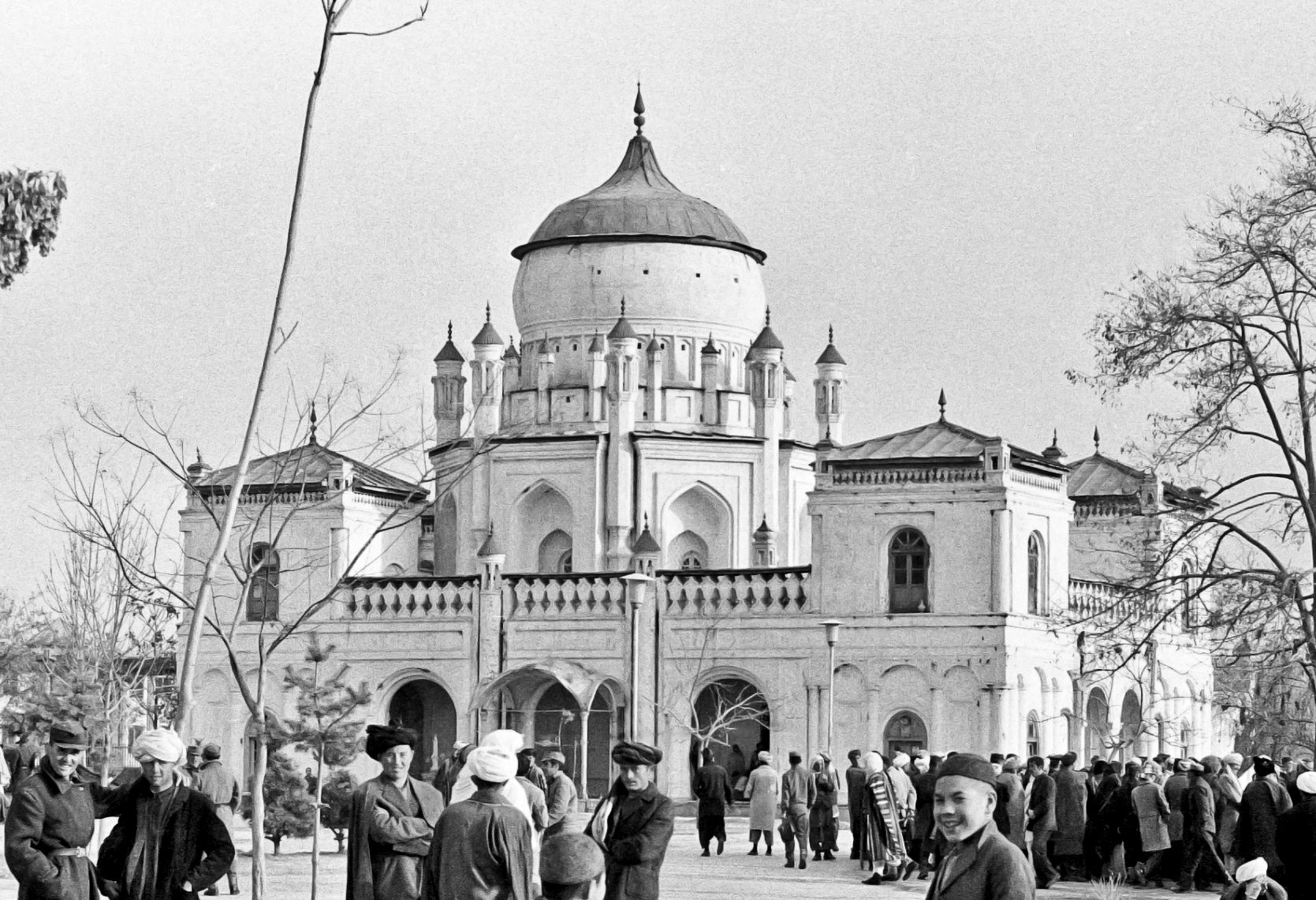
The mausoleum in Zarnegar Park

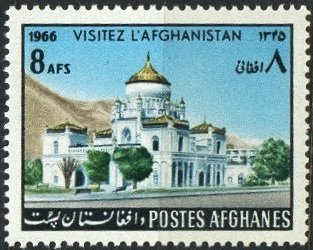
1966 postage stamp depicting the building

The pavilion inside the park was built around 1892 by the then-Emir of Afghanistan, Abdur Rahman Khan, designed by architects from Kandahar. The house served as a personal guest house; after Rahman's death, his son Habibullah Khan decided to bury him here.

The historic 1921 treaty between Afghanistan under Amanullah Khan and the United Kingdom, a follow-up to the Treaty of Rawalpindi, was signed at this palace. Sir Henry Dobbs led the British delegation while Mahmud Tarzi led the Afghan side.

The mausoleum was restored in 2005 by the Aga Khan Trust for Culture.

== Location ==
It is located between several major roads and landmarks of the city. On its western side were the Spinzar Hotel and the ministries of Information as well as Education buildings. To the north is the Lycée Esteqlal, while to the east was the former Hotel Kabul with its own small park.

Since 2012, the Abdul Rahman Mosque touches the park to the south-west.
