= Gardens of Babur =

Park in Chelsatun, Kabul, Afghanistan

- د بابر باغونه باغ بابر
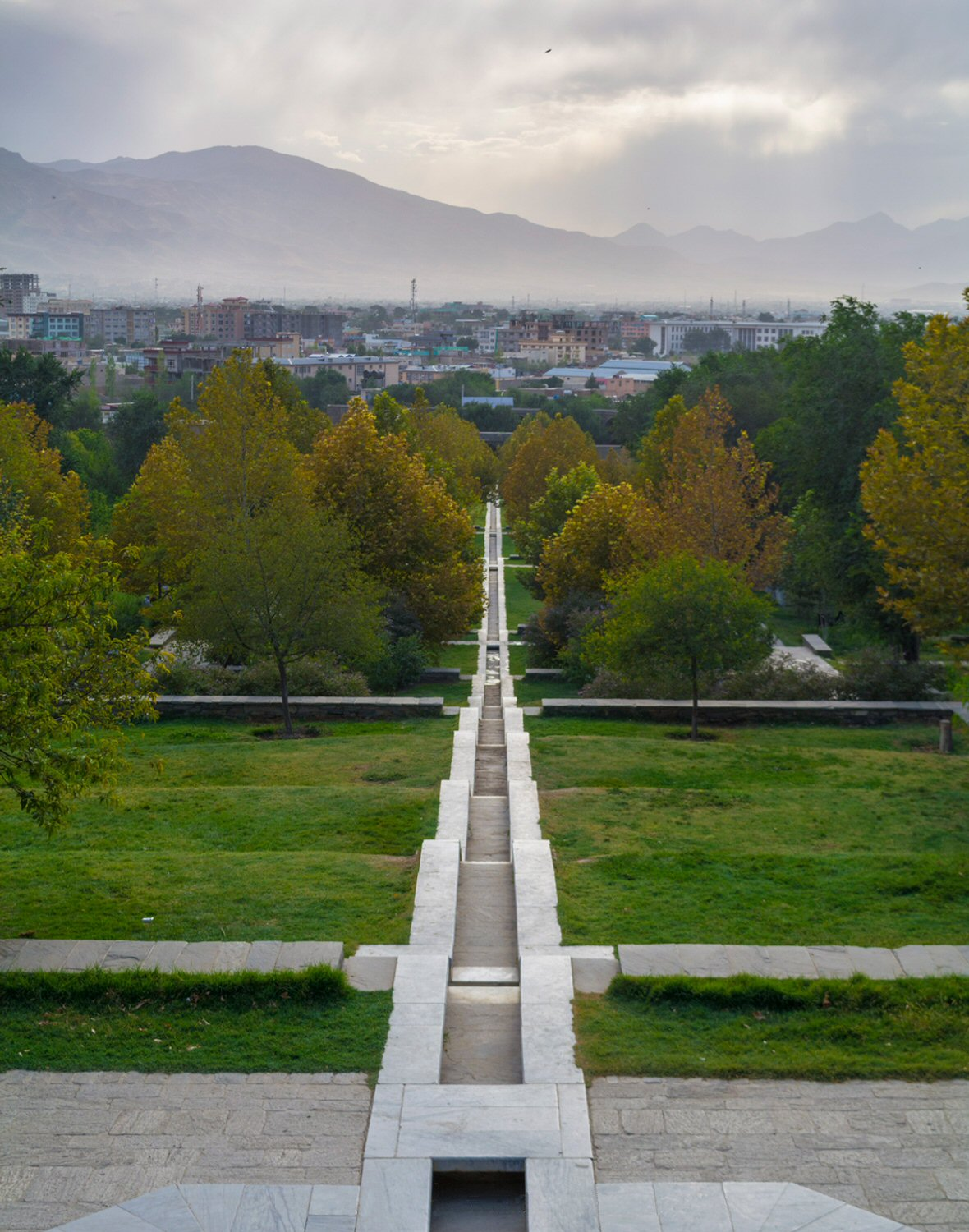
- The stream inside the gardens
- Interactive map of Gardens of Babur
- Location: Guzargah, Kabul, Afghanistan
- Coordinates: 34.503°N 69.158°E
- Area: 11.5 ha (28 acres)
- Established: 1504; 522 years ago
- Founder: Babur
- Open: 7 am–8 pm
- Status: Active
- Parking: Yes

The Gardens of Babur, (Note: Pashto: د بابر باغونه Dari: باغ بابر) is a historic site in District 5 (Nahia 5) of Kabul, Afghanistan. It is located in the Guzargah neighborhood, with the Sher Darwaza mountain being to the east, Chihil Sutun to the south, and the Kabul Zoo to the northwest. The over 500-year-old site has numerous gardens, several terraced buildings, a small mosque, and plenty of walking space. Visited by up to one million locals and foreign tourists a year, it is also where the tombs of the first Mughal emperor Babur and some of his relatives are located. The park is thought to have been developed around 1504, when Babur gave orders for the construction of an "avenue garden" in Kabul, described in some detail in his 16th century memoirs, the Baburnama. It has been re-developed by various Afghan rulers since then.

It was the tradition of Mughal princes to develop sites for recreation and pleasure purposes during their lifetime, and later choose one of these as their last resting place. The site continued to be of significance to Babur's successors; Jahangir made a pilgrimage to the site in 1607, when he ordered that all gardens in Kabul be surrounded by walls, that a prayer platform be laid in front of Babur's grave, and an inscribed headstone placed at its head. During the visit of the Mughal Emperor Shah Jahan in 1638, a marble screen was erected around the tomb of Babur, and a mosque built on the terrace below. There are accounts from the time of the visit to the site of Shah Jahan in 1638 of a stone water channel that ran between an avenue of trees from the terrace below the mosque, with pools at certain intervals.

== History ==
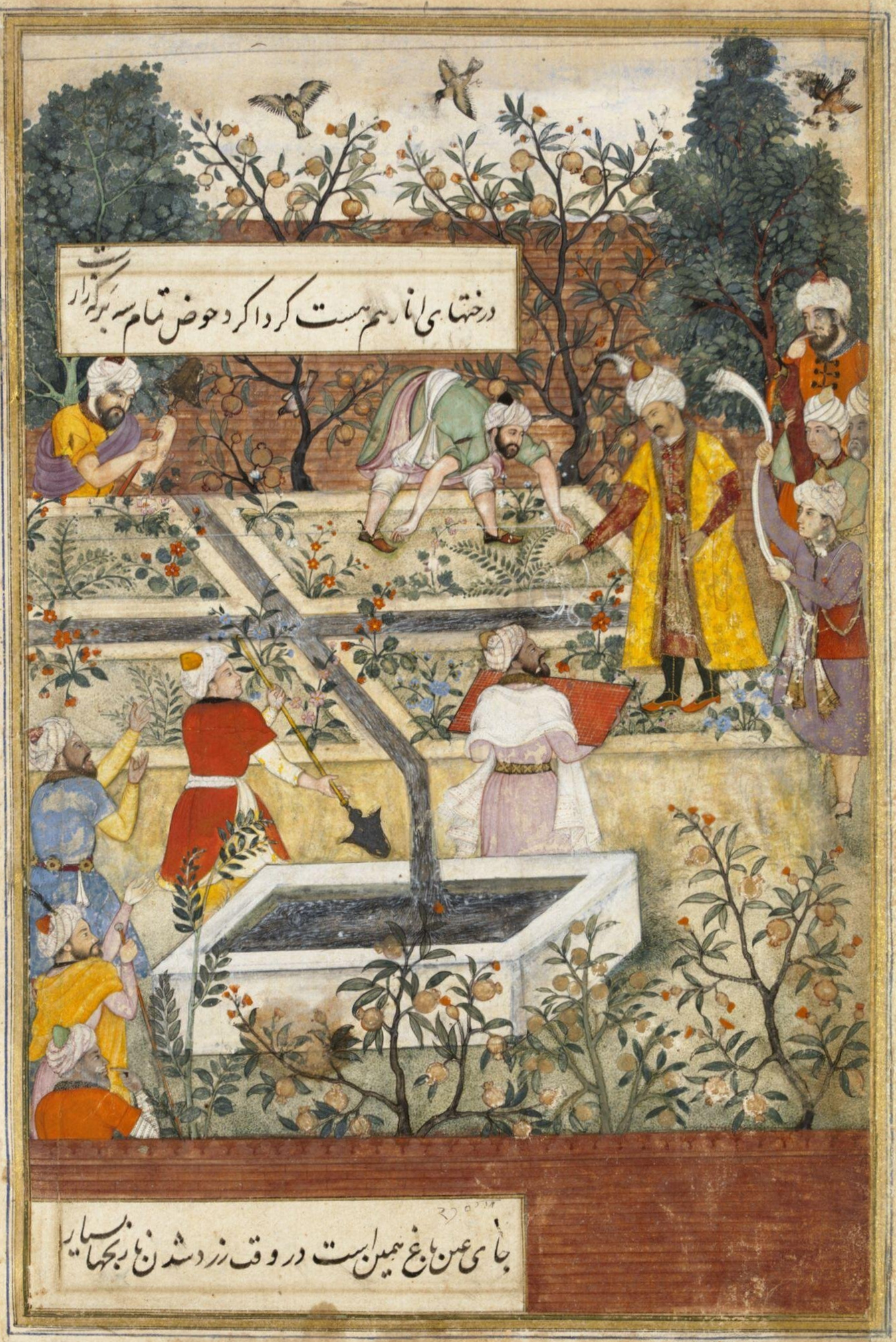
Babur watching men altering the course of the stream. Baburnama (1589).

The original construction year of the Babur Gardens is unknown. Relics have recently been found at the site dating to the 3rd century BC. "In the past caravans came from different parts carrying trade loads and they would exchange their trade loads here," according to the site management. When Babur took over Kabul in 1504 from the Arghun dynasty, he re-developed the site and used it as a guest house for special occasions, especially during the summer seasons.

Since Babur had such a high rank, he would have been buried in a site that befitted him. The garden where it is believed Babur requested to be buried is known as the Gardens of Babur. Mughal rulers saw this site as significant and aided in the further development of the site and other tombs in Kabul. An article written by the Aga Khan Historic Cities Programme, describes the 1638 marble screen by Shah Jahan around the tomb of Babur that:

only this mosque of beauty, this temple of nobility, constructed for the prayer of saints and the epiphany of cherubs, was fit to stand in so venerable a sanctuary as this highway of archangels, this theatre of heaven, the light garden of the god forgiven angel king whose rest is in the garden of heaven, Zahiruddin Muhammad Babur the Conqueror.

Although the additions of the screens by Shah Jahan contained references to Babur, Salome Zajadacz-Hastenrath, in her article "A Note on Babur's Lost Funerary and Enclosure at Kabul" suggests that Shah Jahan's work transformed the Gardens of Babur into a graveyard. She states that a "mosque was built on the thirteenth terrace, the terrace nearest to Mecca; the next, the fourteenth terrace, was to contain the funerary enclosure of Babur's tomb and the tombs of some of his male relatives." This transformation towards a proper graveyard, with an enclosure around Babur's tomb, points towards the importance of Babur. By enclosing Babur's tomb, Shah Jahan separates the tomb of the Emperor from others.

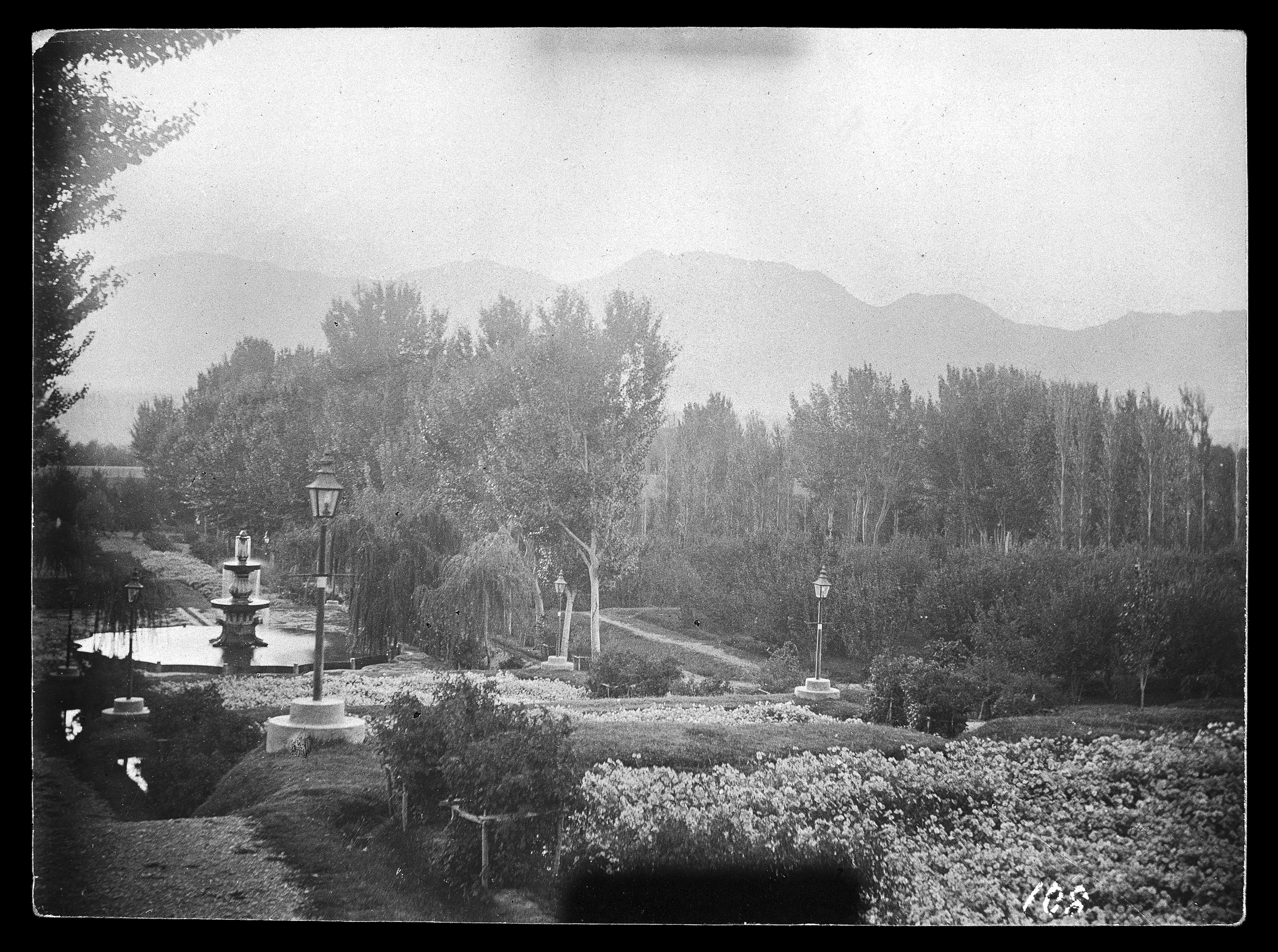
The inside view of the park, 1890s

The only hint of the design lies in an 1832 sketch and short description by Charles Masson, a British soldier, which was published in 1842, the year the tomb was destroyed by an earthquake. One description of the tomb praised it, "although obviously in a poor state of preservation, reveals fine workmanship in stone carving: high walls with lavish jali-work and relief decoration." Mason described the tomb as being "accompanied by many monuments of similar nature, commemorative of his relatives, and they are surrounded by an enclosure of white marble, curiously and elegantly carved... No person superintends them, and great liberty has been taken with the stones employed in the enclosing walls." Mason's sketch and Mason's description give us the only modern view of how extravagant the tomb was. The site has changed drastically from the Mughal impression of the space to the present. Throughout the years outside influences have shaped the use of the site. For example, the Aga Khan Historic Cities Programme describes how by 1880, Amir Abdur Rahman Khan constructed a pavilion and a residence for his wife, Bibi Halima. In 1933, the space was converted into a public recreation space with pools and fountains becoming the central focal point. A modern greenhouse and swimming pool were added in the late 1970s. Although the enclosure of the Babur's tomb is no longer present, the Babur Gardens remains a historically important site in Kabul.

Over the past few years, attempts at rebuilding and reconstructing the city of Kabul and Babur's tomb have been undertaken. Zahra Breshna, an architect with the Department for Preservation & Rehabilitation of Afghanistan's Urban Heritage, argues that “emphasis should be on developing and strengthening the partially forgotten local and traditional aspects, whilst placing them in a contemporary global context. The goal is to preserve the tradition without hindering the development of a modern social, ecological and economical institution." Planners also discuss the importance of 'a revival of cultural identity' in the development of Kabul. These ideas seem to fall in line with the plan of Aga Khan.

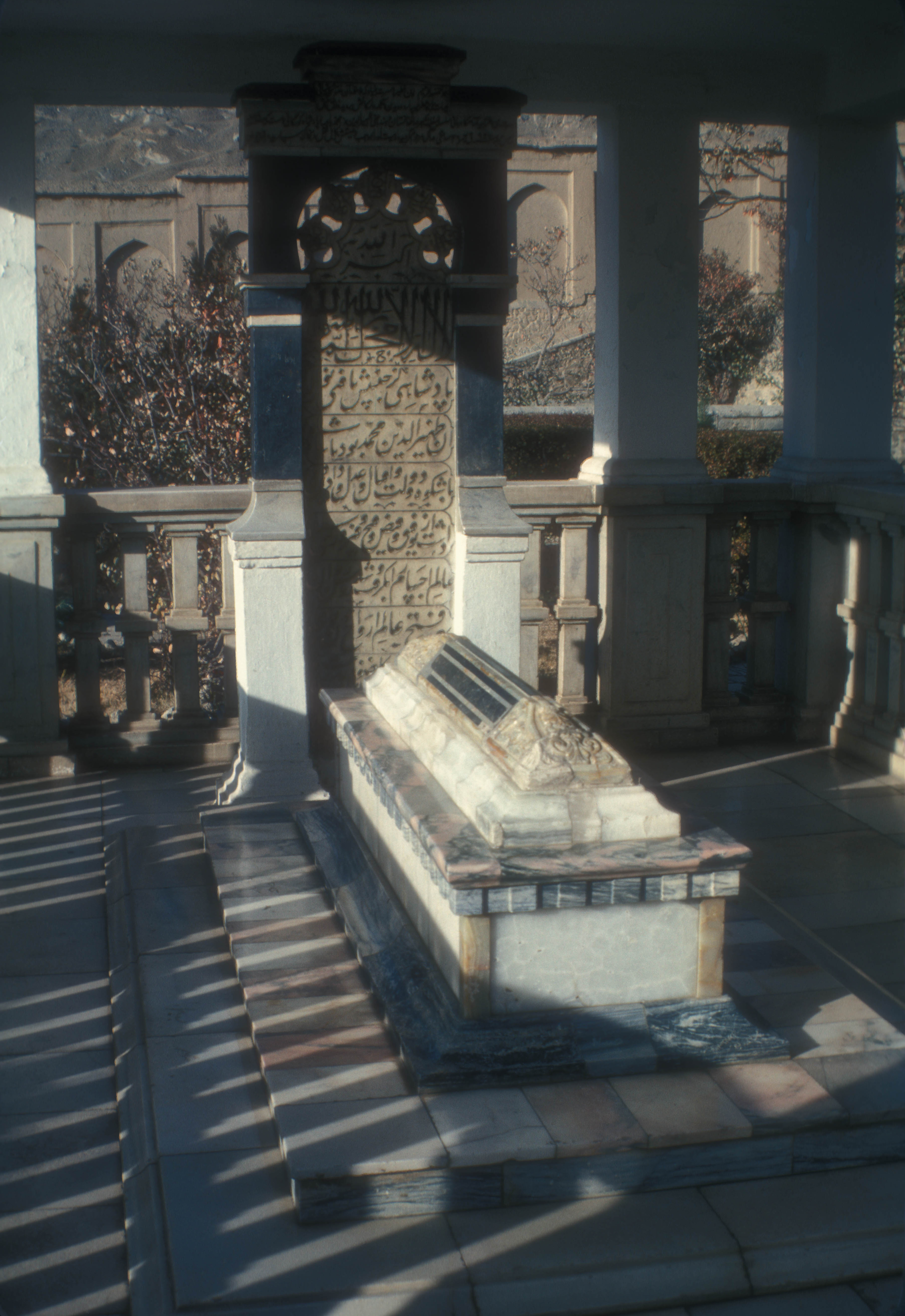
Babur's tomb site inside the park.

The plan put forth by Aga Khan calls for the reconstruction of the Babur Gardens and includes several key components. The rebuilding of the perimeter walls, the rehabilitation of the Shah Jahani mosque, and the restoration of Babur's grave enclosure are all important parts of the rehabilitation of the garden and aid in the 'revival of cultural identity.' The perimeter walls, common throughout many Islamic cities, would provide for the closure of the area. This enclosure of orchards is traditional in the area. Also, the restoration of the Shahjahani mosque, a place for prayer and meditation for visitors to the gardens would be restored.

The biggest idea proposed is the restoration of Babur's tomb. The reconstruction of Babur's garden would bring about a unity fixed around the ruler responsible for the importance of Kabul and the restoration of the historic quarters would restore the pride of the citizens of the city. Architect Abdul Wasay Najimi writes that "Restoration of confidence, pride and hope would be the main outcome in reintegrating the historic quarters in the mainstream rehabilitation and development of Kabul. This would have a direct impact on the revival of identity."

=== Notable people also buried here ===
Some notable members of Babur's family were also buried in the Babur Gardens, including:

- Babur (r. 1494–1530); (1483–1530), founder of Mughal Empire.
- Khanzada Begum (1478–1545), the older sister of Babur, wife of Shaybani Khan and prominent women in the Establishment of Mughal Empire.
- Fakhr-un-Nissa (d. 1501), first born daughter of Babur, died in Infancy.
- Hindal Mirza (1519–1551), the youngest son of Babur. His only child, Ruqaiya Sultan Begum (1542–1626) is buried next to him.
- Gulbadan Begum (1523–1602), daughter of Babur. Author of Humayun-Nama
- Mirza Muhammad Hakim (1553–1585), Humayun's son and Babur's grandson.
- Shah Abul Maali (1550–1564), Humayun's son-in-law and from the family of Sayyids of Termez.

== Restoration ==
The gardens were heavily damaged during the Afghan Civil War (1992–1996). A detailed survey of the perimeter walls of the garden, parts of which are thought to date from the late 19th century, was undertaken. These are built of a mix of traditional hand-laid earth (pakhsa) and sun-dried bricks on stone foundations—techniques still widely used in rural construction in Afghanistan. After careful documentation, damaged sections of the walls were repaired or rebuilt between 2002 and 2004, during which nearly 100,000 work days were generated for skilled and unskilled labour.

As part of efforts to ensure an appropriate degree of accuracy in the conservation and rehabilitation works, a range of documentation was identified and reviewed. In addition to specific references to the Gardens of Babur itself, contemporary accounts of types of trees and arrangements for the distribution of water were reviewed and advice was sought from those who have studied and undertaken rehabilitation work on other Moghul gardens in the region.

Since 2003, the focus of conservation has been on the white marble mosque built by Aurangzeb in 1675 to mark his conquest of Balkh; restoration of the Babur's grave enclosure; repairs to the garden pavilion dating from the early 20th century; and reconstruction of Tajbeg Palace. In addition, a new caravanserai was built on the footprint of an earlier building at the base of the garden (where the base of a gateway built by Shah Jahan has been preserved) and a new swimming pool outside of the garden precinct.

Significant investments have been made in the natural environment of the garden, taking into account the historic nature of the landscape and the needs of contemporary visitors. A system of partially piped irrigation was installed, and several thousand indigenous trees were planted, including planes, cypresses, hawthorn, wild cherry (alubalu—allegedly introduced by Babur from the north of Kabul) and other fruit and shade trees. Based on the results of archaeological excavations, the relationships between the 13 terraces and the network of paths and stairs have been re-established.

Since January 16, 2008, the garden has been managed by the independent Babur Gardens Trust, with support from Kabul Municipality, the Afghan Ministry of Information and Culture, and the Aga Khan Trust for Culture. The gardens have seen a significant increase in visitor numbers and revenue. Nearly 300,000 people visited the site in 2008 and about 1,030,000 people visited the site in 2016.

== Gallery ==
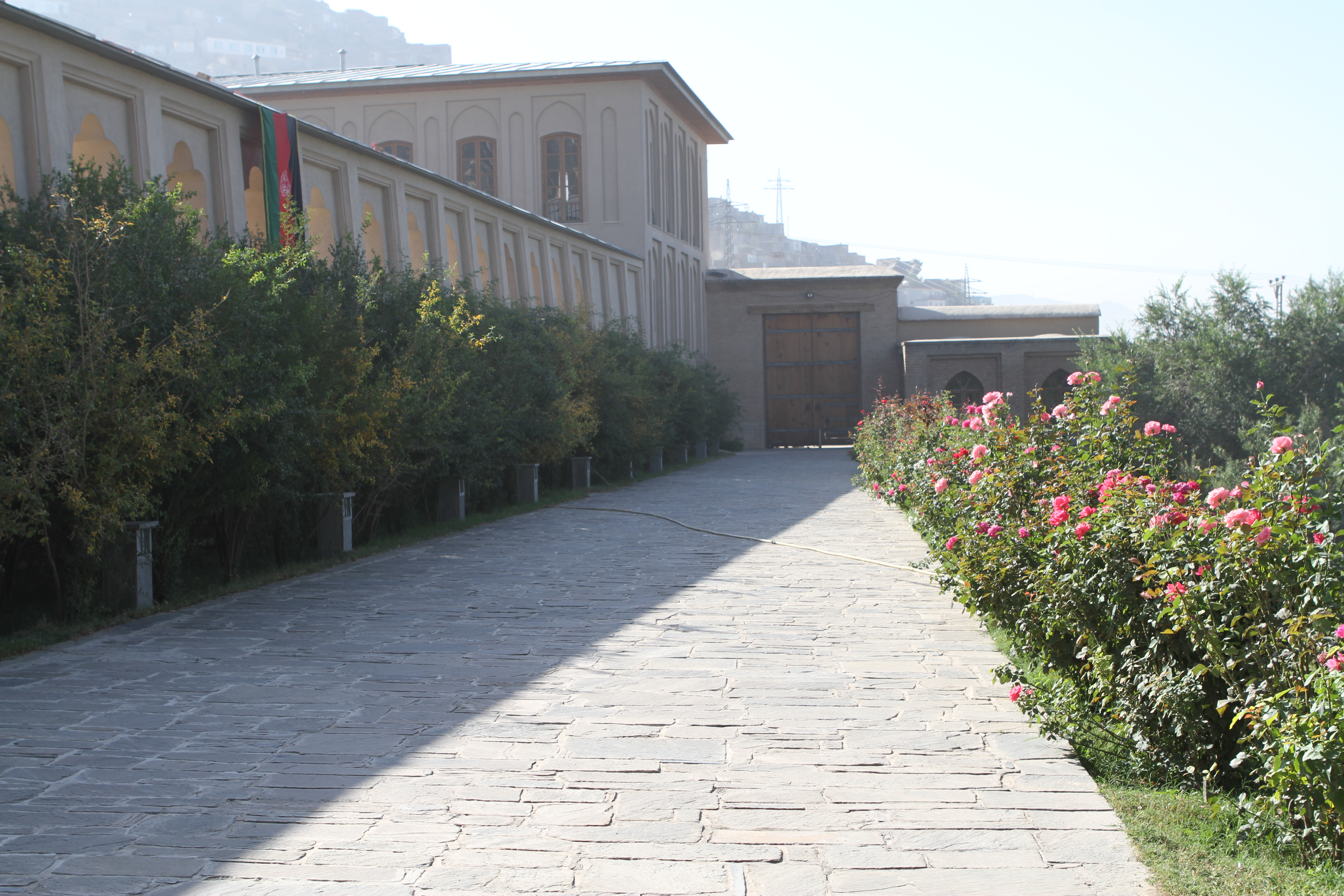
Besides flowers and ordinary trees, fruit trees are grown inside the garden, including pomegranate and cherry.

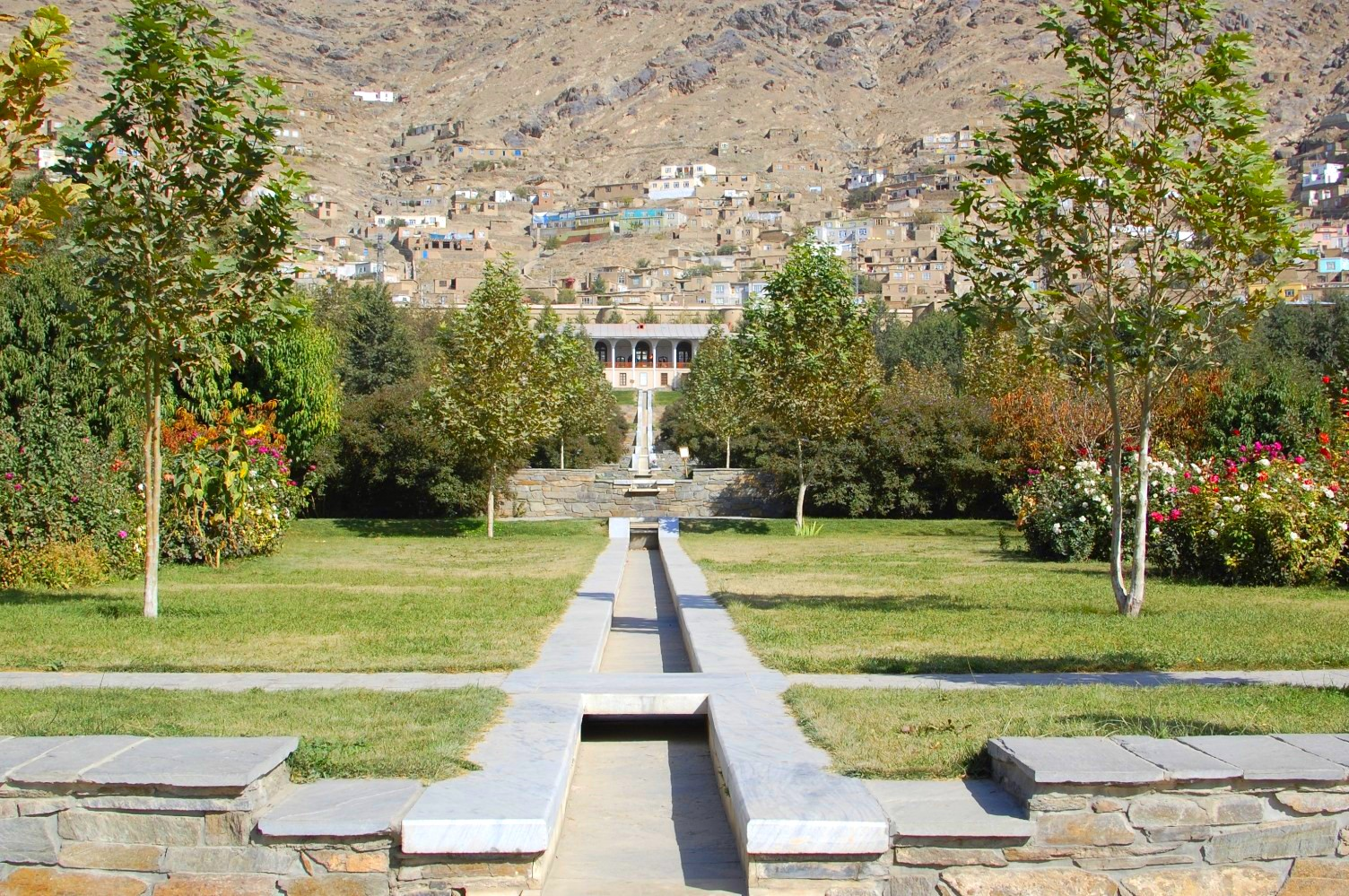
Maple trees inside the gardens

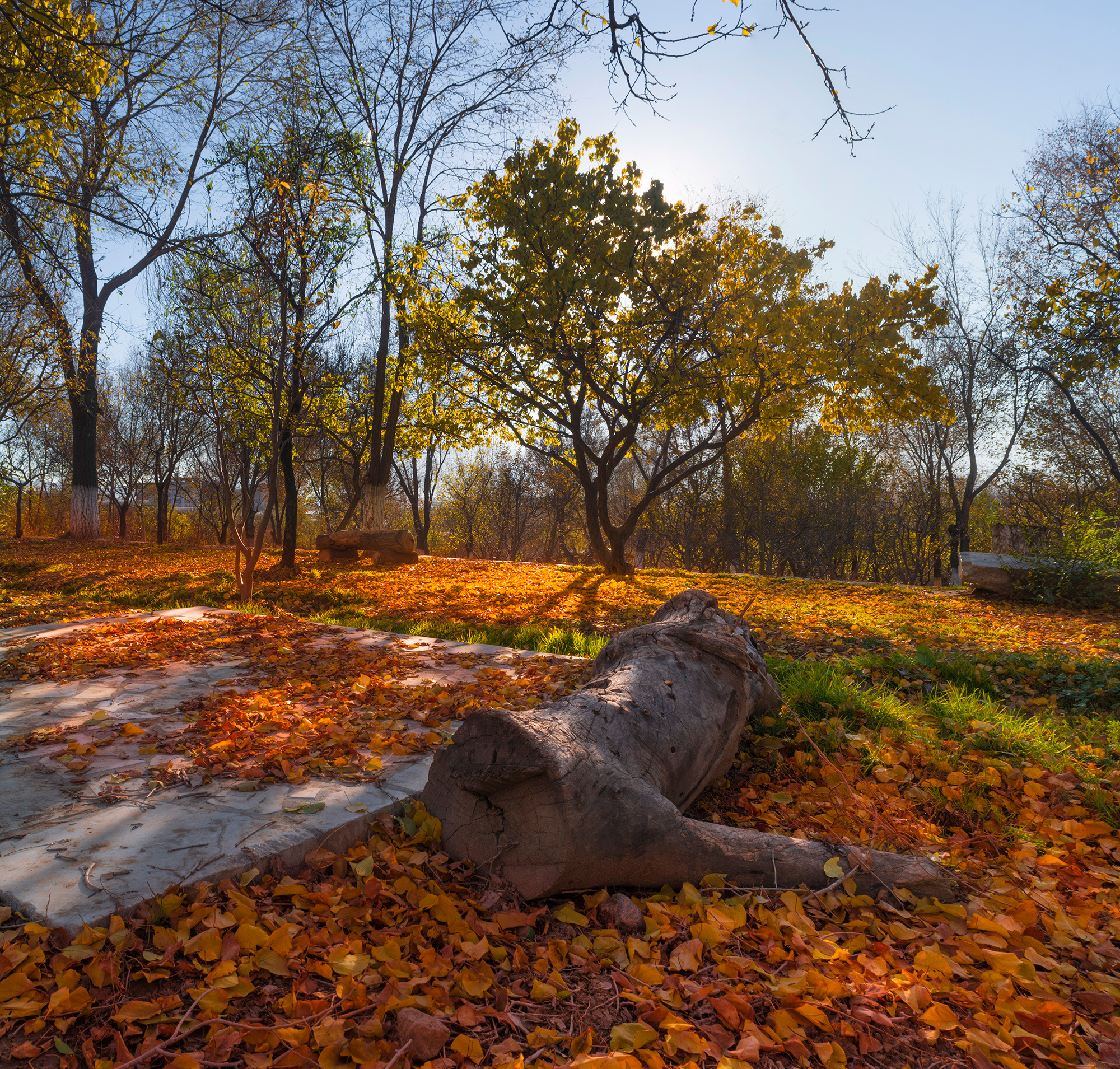
November 2015

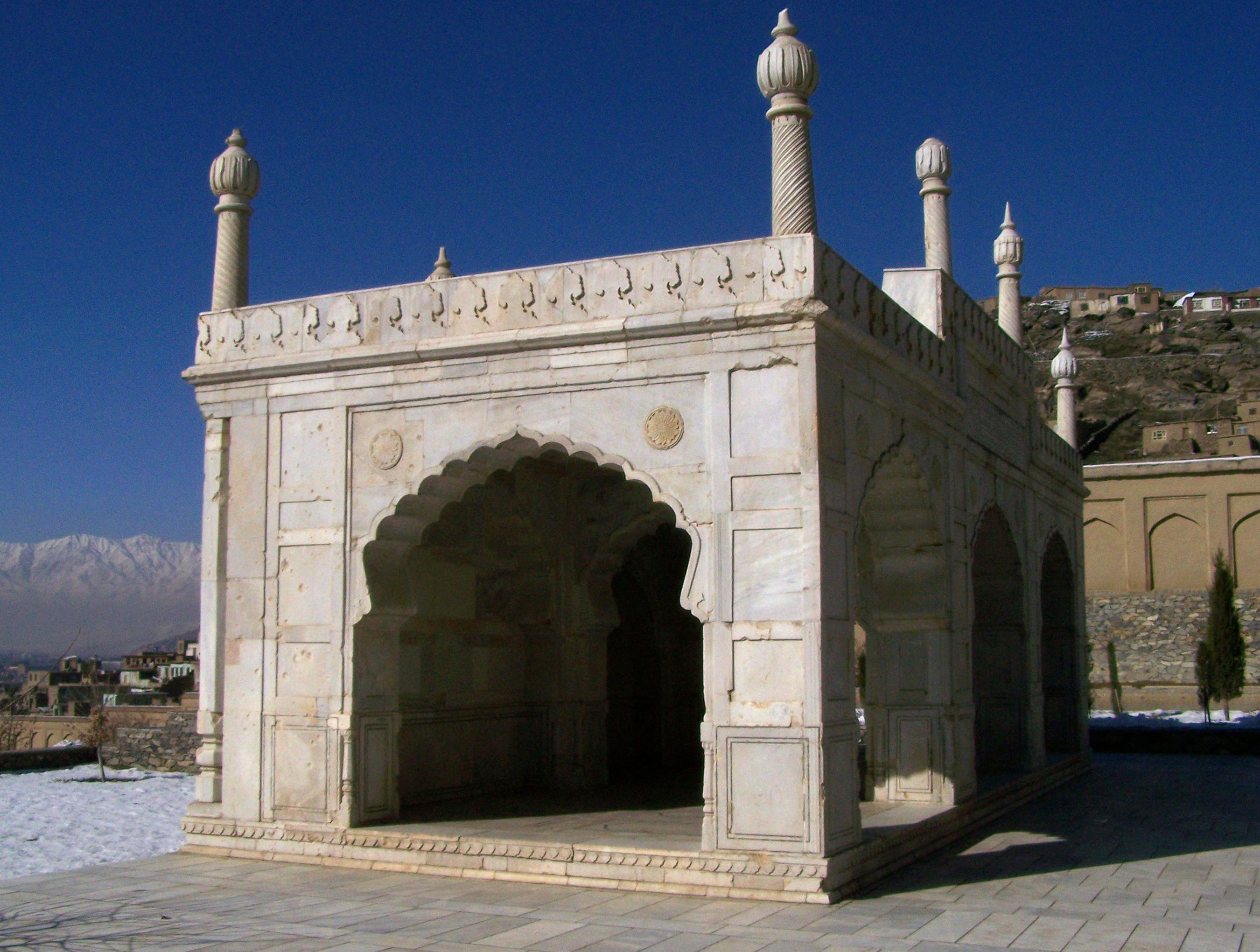
Small mosque inside the gardens

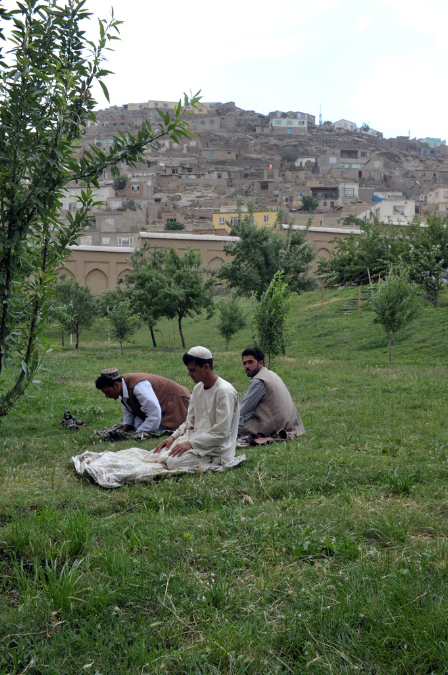
Men praying

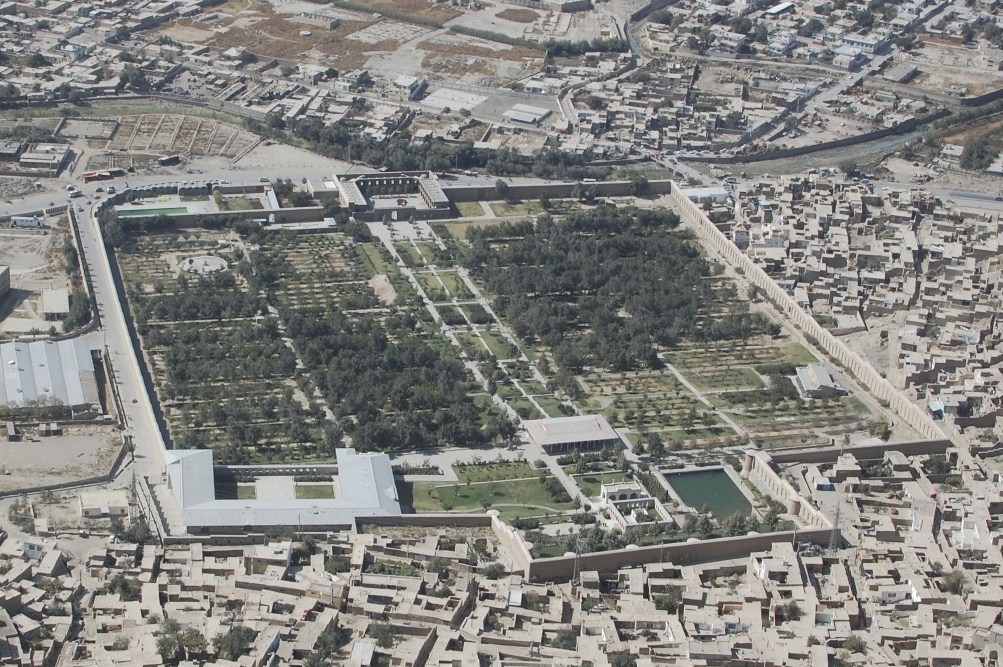
View of the gardens from a mountain top in 2009

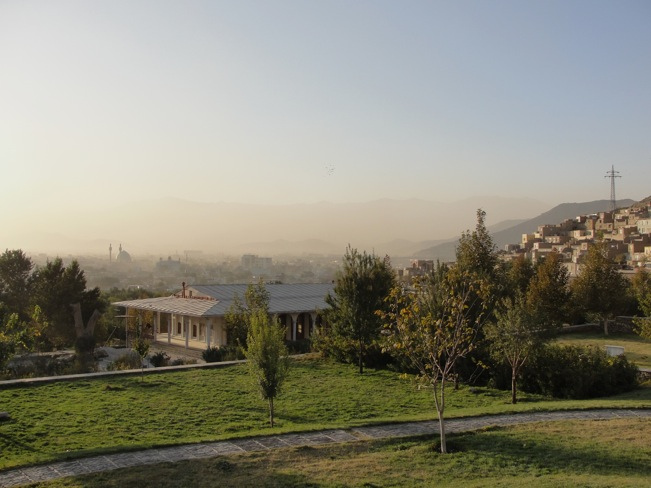
October 2010

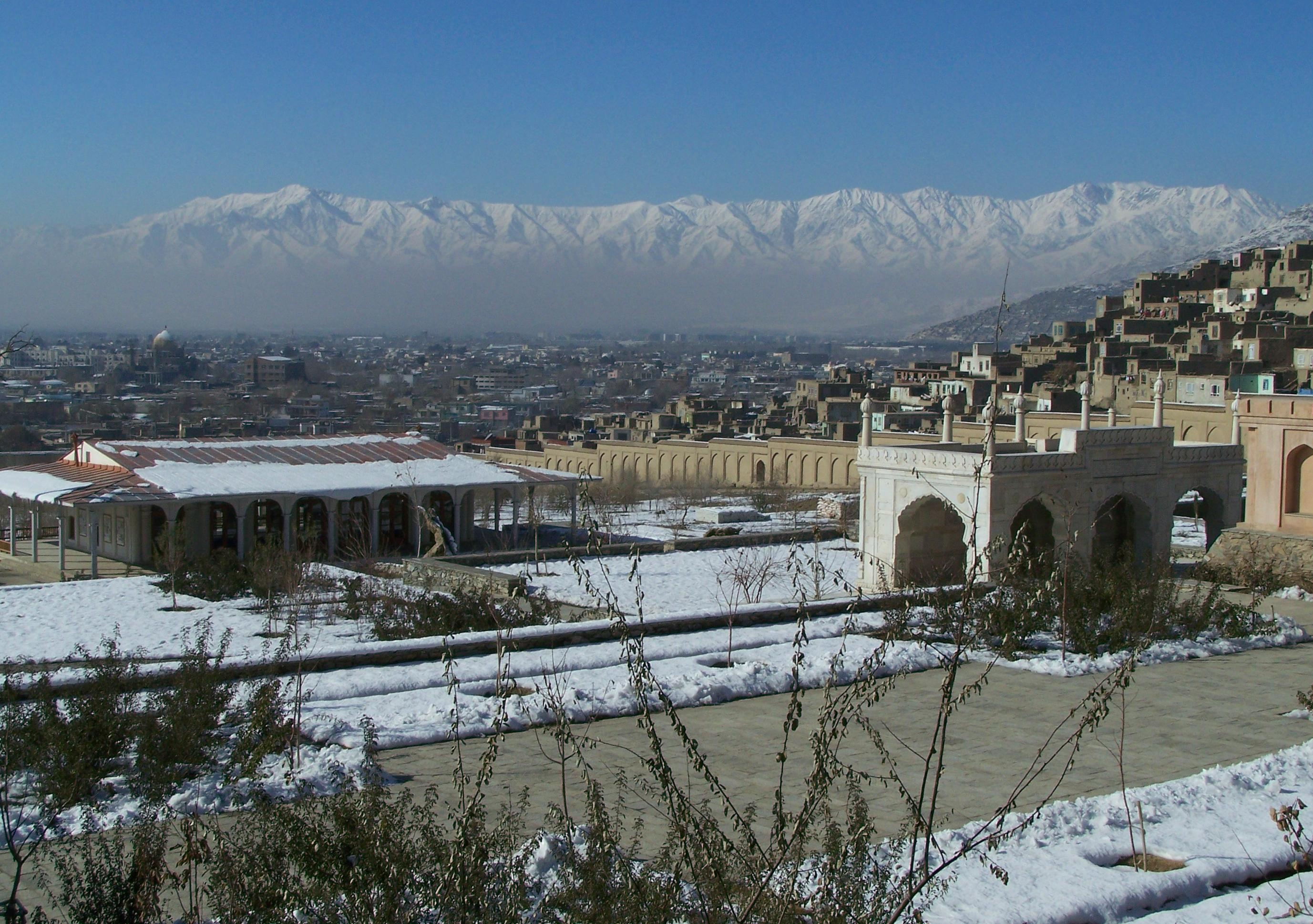
Winter 2006

The Shahjahani Mosque or Marble Mosque in the Babur Gardens in Kabul, 2025

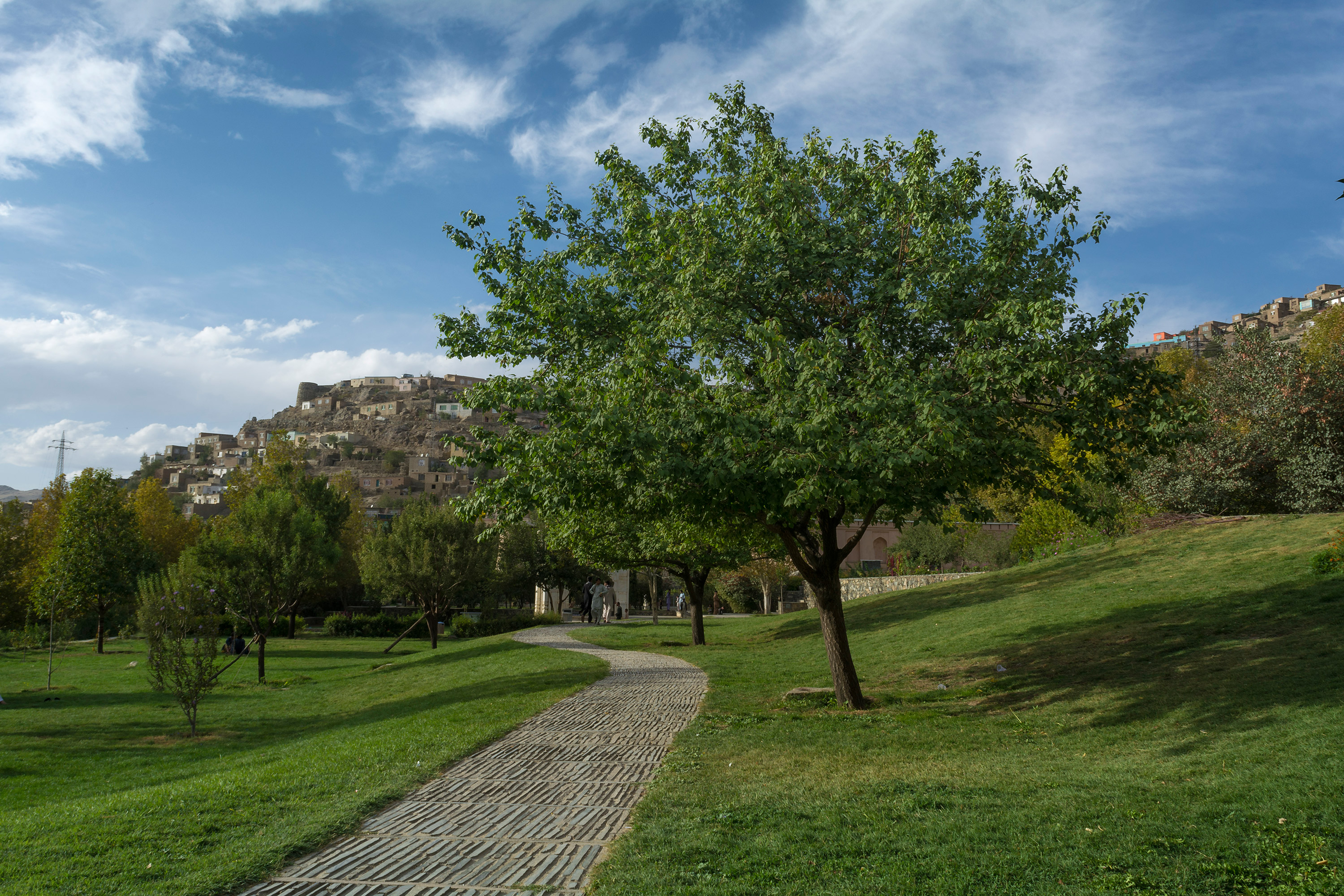
Summer 2015

== See also ==
- List of World Heritage Sites in Afghanistan
- Tourism in Afghanistan
- Bagh-e Bala Palace
- Darul Aman Palace
- Maranjan Hill
- Paghman Hill Castle
- Wazir Akbar Khan Hill
- Zarnegar Park
