= Chihil Sutun =

Coordinates: 34.467335°N 69.152338°E

- چهل‌ستون
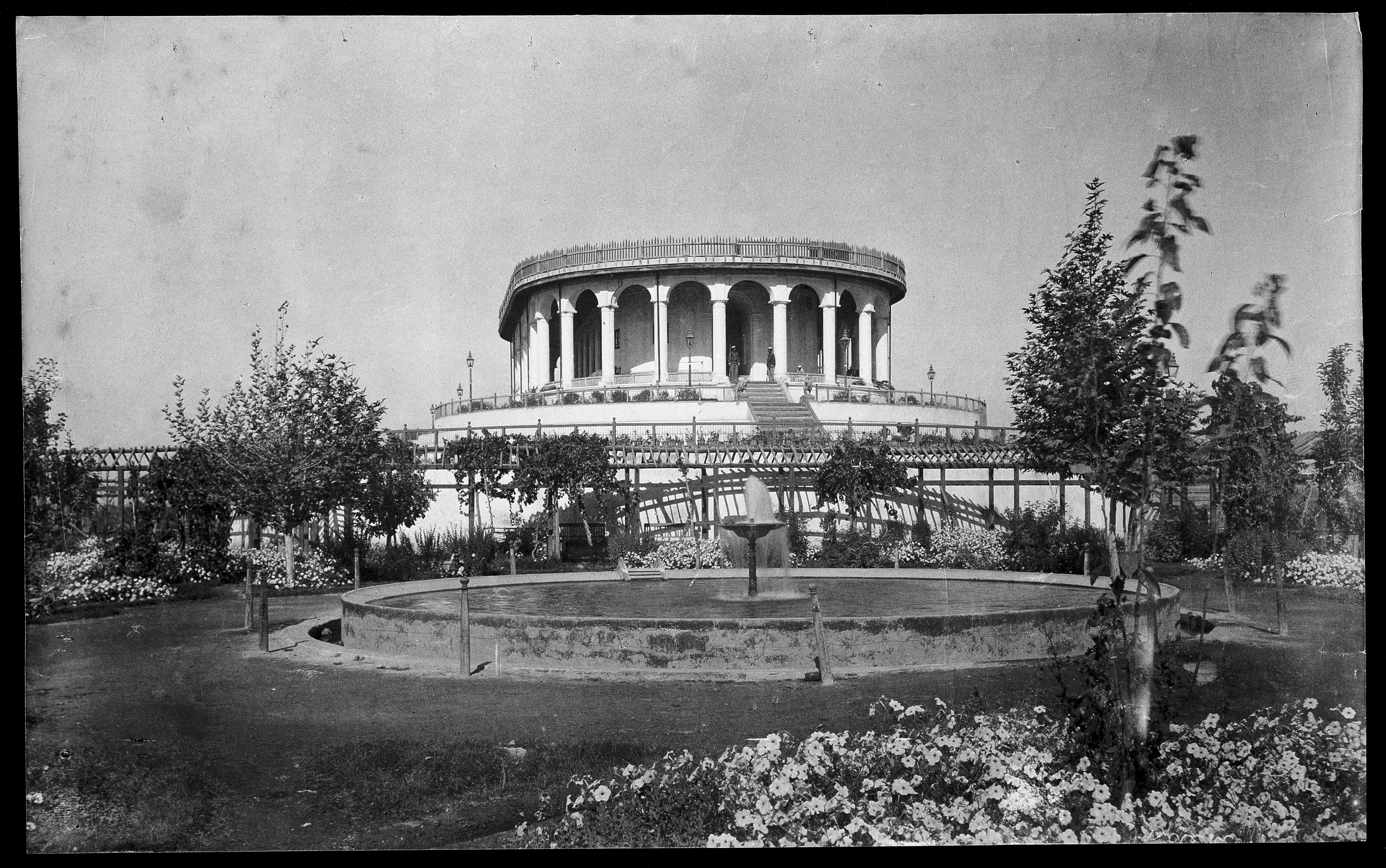
- Interactive map of the Chihil Sutun area
- Former names: Hendaki
- Alternative names: Chihilsitoon
- Etymology: Forty Columns

General information
- Type: Palace
- Location: Kabul, Afghanistan
- Estimated completion: 1796

Chihil Sutun (Dari: چهل‌ستون, meaning "Forty Columns"), also spelled as Chehel Sutoon, Chelsutoon, Chehelseton or Chihilsitoon, is a historic palace with gardens in Kabul, Afghanistan. The 30-hectare park is fully walled and located in the city's historical Chihilsitoon neighborhood, about 3.6.km east of the Darulaman neighborhood.

The Chihil Sutun Palace was built by Emperor Zaman Shah Durrani in 1796. Many people visit the site for pleasure and leisure purposes. The park and neighborhood are part of District 7 of the city. Bagh-e Babur is a few kilometers to the north.

== History ==
Chihil Sutun was developed in the late 18th century by Zaman Shah, one of rulers of the Durrani Empire. The current palace and pavilion were originally built at the same location by then-Emir Abdur Rahman Khan at the end of the 19th century. Historic maps also refer to both the palace and area as Hendaki. The palace's commemorative plaque was set in 1888. It was expanded with paved walkways and marble fountains by his successor Habibullah Khan. It had been used at times as a state guesthouse during the 20th century, notably being the visiting residence of U.S. President Dwight Eisenhower and Soviet leader Nikita Khrushchev, and during the communist era, was used as a government media hub. The site was heavily damaged by the 1990s civil war and laid in ruins for years, before it was fully rebuilt in 2018.

Chihil Sutun Palace is located in the Chihilsitoon neighborhood in the southern part of the city, just east from the Kabul River. The Chihilsitoon Road links it towards central Kabul to the north and Darulaman to the west. Like other places of District 7, it is an unplanned area and generally poor.

== See also ==
- Arg, Kabul
- Bagh-e Bala Palace
- Darul Aman Palace
- Paghman Hill Castle
- Tajbeg Palace

== Gallery ==
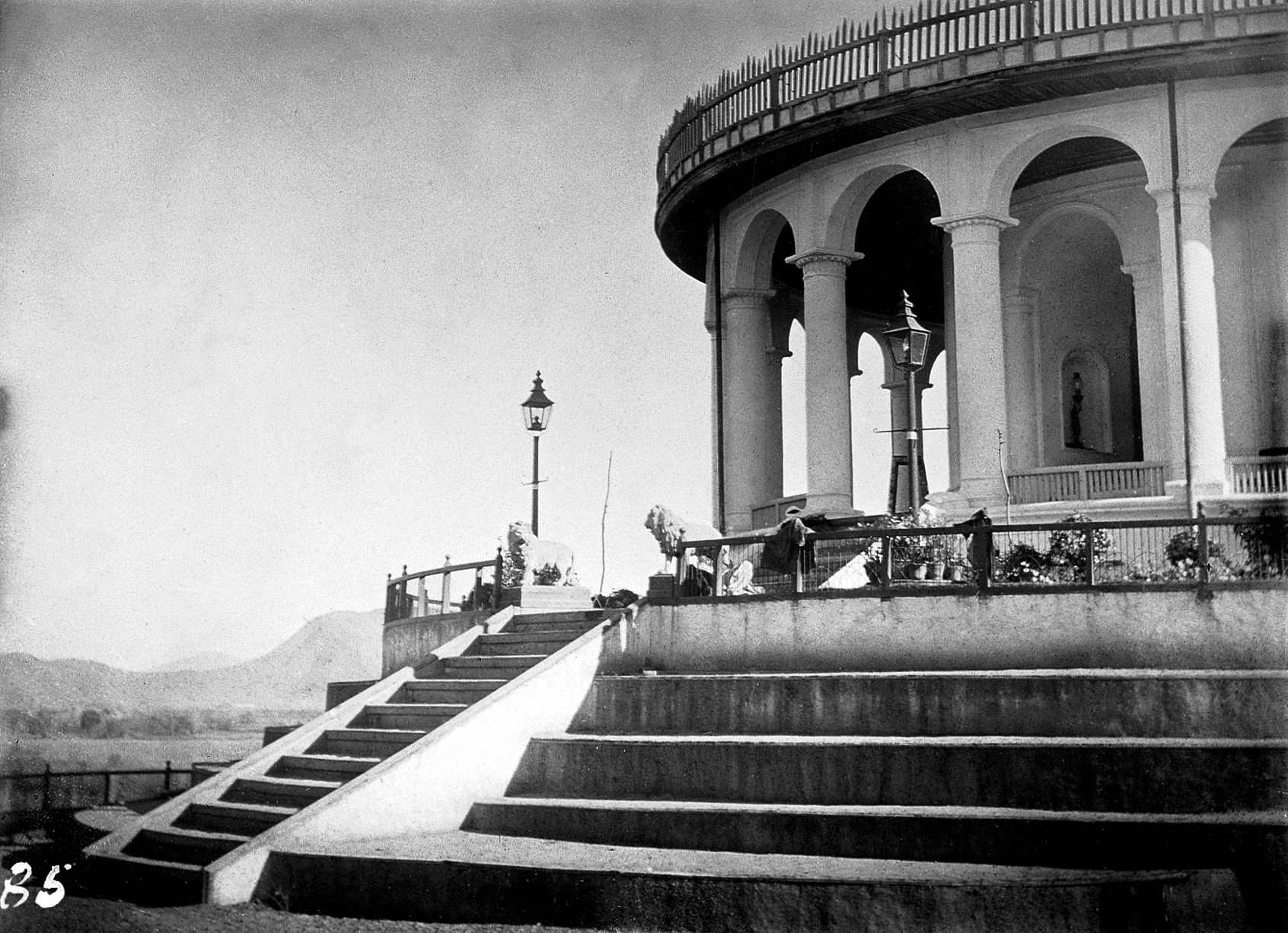
Entrance and stairs leading to the palace

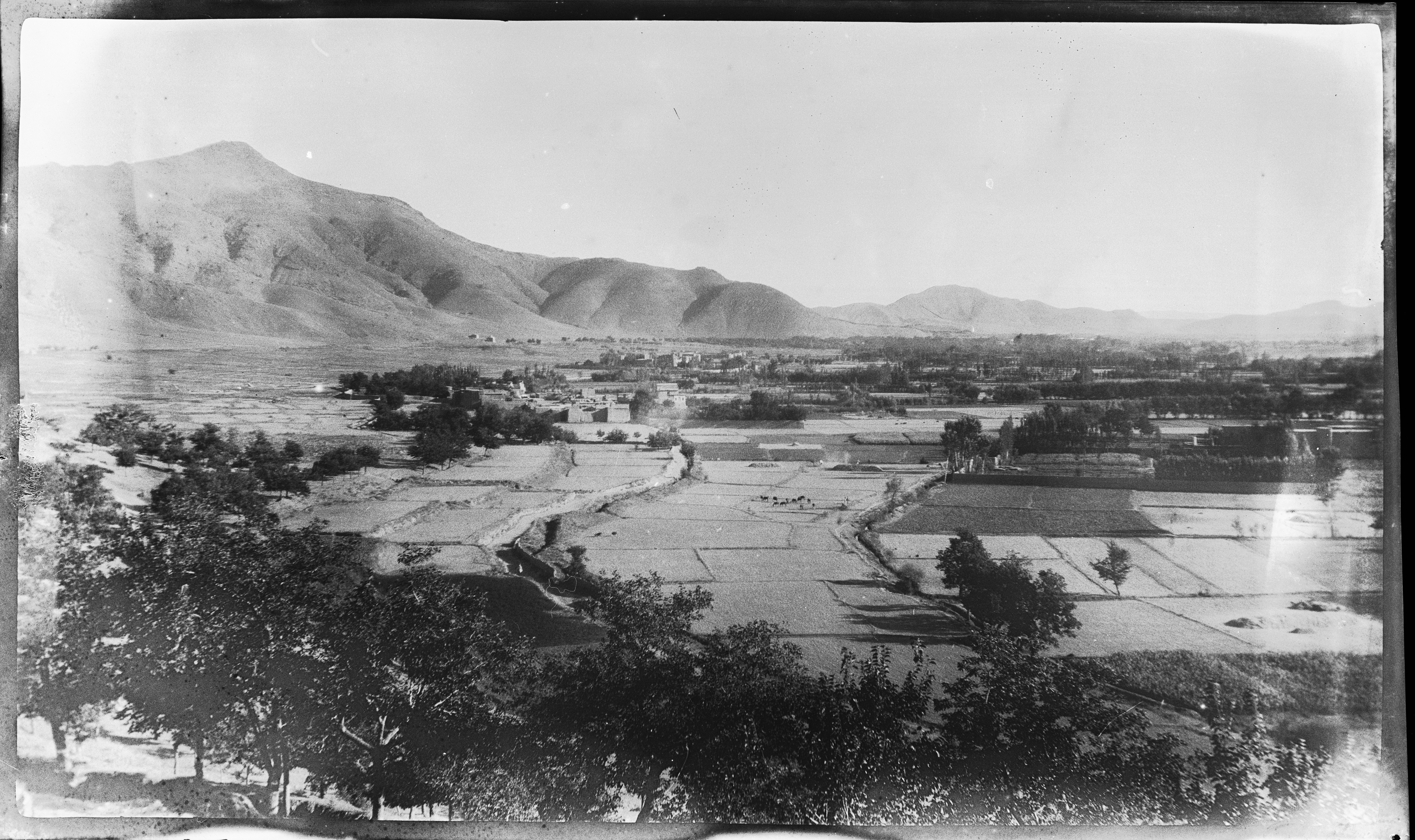
A plain looking towards Chihil Sutun from the Gardens of Babur in 1924

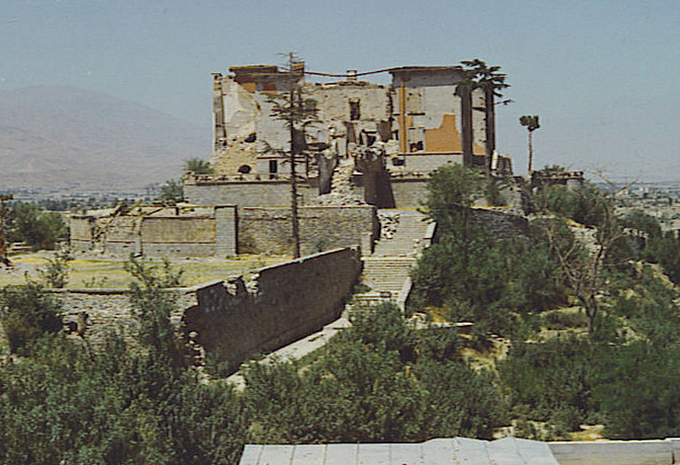
War damaged Chihil Sutun palace in the mid 1990s
