= Darul Aman =

Darul Aman may refer to:

- Darulaman, an area in the outskirts of Kabul, Afghanistan
  - Darul Aman Palace, a palace in Darulaman
- Darul Aman Stadium, a stadium in Alor Star, Kedah, Malaysia
- Darul Aman Highway, a highway in Kedah, Malaysia
- Darul Aman Juma Masjid, a mosque in Darul Aman campus.
- Kedah Darul Aman, a state of Malaysia
- Dar-ul-Amaan (also spelled as Dar-ul-Aman, Dar ul Aman or Darul Aman), a type of women's shelter homes in Pakistan
