= Hosna Jalil =

Afghan politician

- حسنا جليل
- Incumbent
- Assumed office December 2018

Personal details
- Born: Hosna; 27 Mar, 1992 (30) Afghanistan
- Occupation: Politician

Hosna Jalil (Dari: حسنا جلیل), is the first Afghan woman ever appointed as high Interior Ministry post in Afghanistan. She was appointed on 5 December 2018. Her appointment at the age of 26 raised some reactions in Afghan social media. She had served most recently as Deputy Minister for Policy and Planning in her government’s Ministry of Women’s Affairs.

Jalil has graduated from the American University of Afghanistan with master's degree in business and management, followed by a master’s in Strategic Security Studies from the National Defense University in Washington.

She served as an advisory board member of the GLO.ACT Women’s Network at UNODC that combats the human trafficking and smuggling of migrants.
