= American University of Afghanistan =

Former university in Kabul, Afghanistan

- دانشگاه آمریکایی افغانستان د افغانستان امریکايي پوهنتون
- Type: Private university
- Established: 2006
- Founder: Sharif Fayez
- President: Ian Bickford
- Provost: Victoria C Fontan
- Location: Kabul, Afghanistan; 34°28′32″N 69°7′35″E
- Mascot: Simorgh
- Website: www.auaf.edu.af

The American University of Afghanistan (Note: Pashto: د افغانستان امریکايي پوهنتون Dari: دانشگاه آمریکایی افغانستان) (AUAF) is an online private university. After the fall of Kabul in 2021, many former students of AUAF live abroad and transitioned to online teaching. Subsequently, AUAF established an interim campus at Education City in Doha, Qatar. In-person teaching commenced there in 2022. Funded by Qatar and the US government, the institution had 184 students on site, 118 of whom were women. Around 700 more students were enrolled on online courses in Afghanistan. The temporary arrangement with Qatar was subsequently extended. In 2025, the Qatar Fund for Development announced a new agreement with the Qatar Foundation and AUAF, which did not publicly specify its duration. AUAF was the country's only private, not-for-profit institution of higher education.

It was formerly located in the Darulaman section of Kabul.

Chartered in 2004, the AUAF offered an MBA program, four undergraduate degree programs, pre-college preparation (Academy) and continuing education and professional development training (the Professional Development Institute). It opened in 2006 with 50 students, which grew to 1,700 full and part-time students. Its alumni include 29 Fulbright Scholars.

The spring 2025 semester session at the university was briefly suspended due to funding cuts at USAID with funding later extended until June 2025.

== History ==
The idea for the American University of Afghanistan began in 2002 with Dr. Sharif Fayez, then Afghan Minister of Higher Education. At this time he proposed the creation of Afghanistan's first-ever private university. The following year in an address before UNESCO, then U.S. First Lady Laura Bush announced her support of educational initiatives in Afghanistan. The U.S. Ambassador Zalmay Khalilzad, likely inspired from his own experience at the American University of Beirut, encouraged the establishment of the American University of Afghanistan.

The Afghanistan High Commission for Private Investment offered leases on two parcels of land totaling 55.354 acres (224,010 m^{2}) in the Darulaman area of Kabul until 2013. In addition, the American University of Afghanistan corporation was chartered in the State of Delaware, under the leadership of Dr. Jacob van Lutsenburg Maas, who later became the non-profit corporation's president, to receive these leases. In 2007, the non-profit corporation became a tax-exempt 501(c)(3) organization.

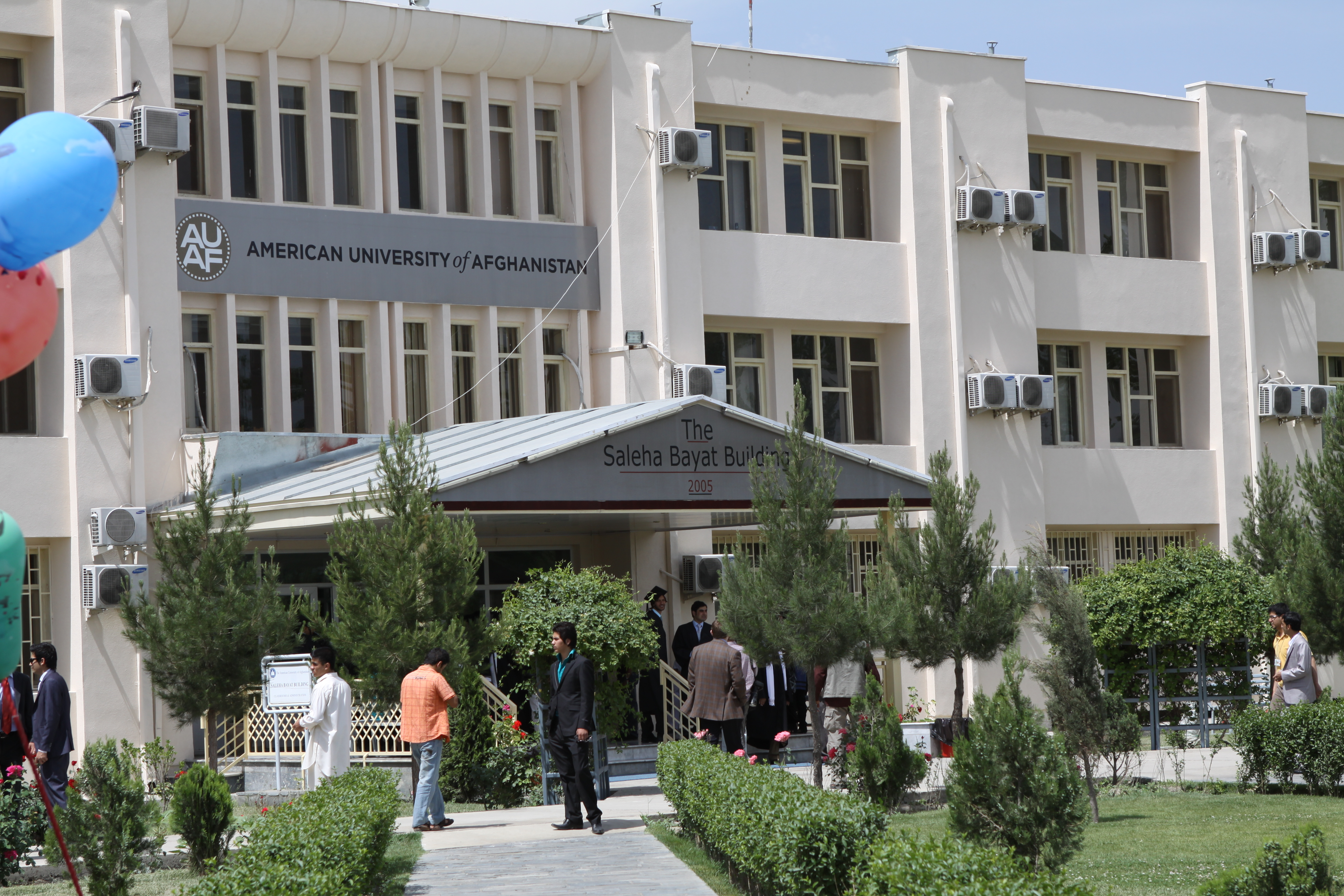
The Saleha Bayat Building at the American University of Afghanistan (AUAF) in Kabul.

A charter for the establishment of the American University of Afghanistan was granted on July 26, 2004, by the Afghan Ministry of Higher Education, under Article 46, Chapter 2 of the new Afghan Constitution and Article 445 of the Civil Code. A feasibility study was initiated by the Coordinating Council of International Universities, based in the United States, to recommend an institutional framework.

In December 2004, the inaugural meeting of the Board of Trustees convened in Dubai, United Arab Emirates, where Dr. Fayez was elected President pro tempore, serving in this capacity until April 2007, when he was named "founder" by the new president. He continued to lobby the Afghan government on the university's behalf, served as an adviser to the current president, and maintained an office on campus until his death in 2019.

In March 2005, then U.S. First Lady (and former teacher) Laura Bush visited the site and announced a substantial grant from the United States Agency for International Development (USAID) to launch the institution.

The first students of the American University of Afghanistan enrolled in March 2006. They began with classes to improve their English language and study skills. By September of that year, the university began offering its first credit-bearing undergraduate courses. The Professional Development Institute was also launched in the same year, providing adult professional courses and adult professional level programs.

On June 8, 2008, Mrs. Bush announced an additional $40 million (USD) in funding for the subsequent five years. Funding will cover more than half of the university's operating expenses during that period, leaving the university to pursue private funding for the remainder of its operating expenses and for the development of its new campus.

The university held its first commencement ceremony in May 2011, awarding undergraduate degrees to 32 graduates. It held its fourth, and largest, graduation in December 2014, where 180 undergraduate and graduate students graduated. In May 2015, the university held its sixth commencement ceremony, honoring the class of 2015, at the university's International campus. The highlight of the ceremony was the presentation of the Doctorate of Humane Letters Honorary Degree to distinguished guest, former Afghan President Hamid Karzai, who also delivered the commencement address.

In 2019, more than 1,700 full and part-time students from all 34 provinces of Afghanistan are enrolled in the university, including 1,190 students in undergraduate and graduate program, and 950 students in certification courses. About 36% of students for Spring 2015 were women, and more than 85% of the students receive financial assistance. In an interview with Film Annex, Dr. C. Michael Smith, former President of the American University of Afghanistan stated that for the 2012–13 school year over 50% of the entering students were women.

The college is also a member of an alliance of universities, non-profit organisations, and educational institutions aiming to provide educational opportunities for Afghan women and girls.

=== 2014 Taliban attack ===
Two employees were killed as a result of a Taliban gun and bomb attack on a restaurant in Kabul where the employees were dining in January 2014. Some 21 people reportedly died in the attack.

=== 2016 ===
==== August 7 ====
An American and Australian professor were kidnapped on 7 August 2016, by criminals dressed in Afghan National Police uniforms. A team of U.S. Special Forces attempted to rescue them but failed. They were released 3 years later, in November 2019, in an exchange for three Taliban prisoners.

==== August 24 ====
On the evening of August 24, 2016, three gunmen opened fire and detonated explosives on campus killing seven university students, one policeman, three security guards at the university, one university professor, and a guard from a neighboring school. Fraidoon Obaidi, chief of the Criminal Investigation Department of Kabul Police, said that they were able to kill the attackers. No group claimed responsibility.

=== 2021 ===
With the withdrawal of United States troops from Afghanistan (2020–2021), Peter Bergen reported that thousands of university-educated students were hoping to flee Afghanistan, but were unable to. Eventually many were studying in Qatar, at the American University of Central Asia in Bishkek, Kyrgyzstan, and at Bard College in New York, among other locations. Students may also apply through the Open Society University Network (OSUN), a consortium of colleges offering shared online courses worldwide. Despite losing its Afghan accreditation and undergoing a restructuring, the AUOF received around 10,000 applications for 350 spots during an early intake.

== Programs ==
All programs were conducted entirely in English. The university ran on the U.S. semester system with the academic year starting in August, and in other respects also operates in the style of American universities.

The Graduate Degree Program

AUAF, in fall 2011, began its first graduate program, offering the master of business administration degree. The program built on the success of the university's undergraduate business program, which was the most popular major among AUAF students. A total of 29 students were admitted in the first MBA class. The program had 14 credit courses, providing a view of general business management. The first cohort graduated in May 2013. On May 22, 2015, a total of 59 students graduated from MBA. Masters of Arts in Education program was launched at AUAF in March 2014. It was a collaborative effort with Afghan Ministry of Education Teacher Training Directorate, and with funding from the Afghanistan Reconstruction Trust Fund (ARTF) and the World Bank. On April 17, 2015, AUAF held the graduation ceremony for the inaugural cohort of students in this program. The program included 318 students (23% female), representing all of the country's 34 provinces.

The Undergraduate Degree Program

The American University of Afghanistan offered a four-year undergraduate degree programs in business administration with concentrations in management, accounting, finance and marketing, information technology and computer science, and political science and public administration. AUAF held its sixth commencement ceremony of class 2015, on May 22, 2015.

In fall 2008, Stanford Law School's Afghanistan Legal Education Project was launched at the university. It provides introductory legal training that features the first new text in decades dedicated to the legal system in Afghanistan. In September 2012, AUAF and Stanford University received a $7.2 million grant for this program from the US State Department.

The Professional Development Institute

The American University of Afghanistan's Professional Development Institute was established in 2006. It offered training courses, workshops, and seminars to professionals from private sector, government, and non-governmental organizations working in Afghanistan and the region. PDI offers a broad range of training and education courses throughout Afghanistan to private business, non-profit organizations, NGOs, government agencies and individuals. The English Language Center within the institute provides a comprehensive range of English language training for non-native speakers. PDI administers short-term courses in accounting, finance, project management, human resources management, and information technologies.

== Organization ==
The overall governance and management of AUAF was overseen by the board of trustees.

The first president of the university was president pro tempore Sharif Fayez, Afghanistan's Minister of Higher Education from 2002 to 2004. In January 2015, Dr. Mark A. English assumed leadership of the university as President. Dr. C. Michael Smith stepped down after nearly six years of exceptional service. The university's Provost and Vice President for Academic Affairs is Prof. Victoria C Fontan. n March 2026, Ian Bickford, the former president of AUOF, stepped down after five years in the role. David B. Edwards, an AUAF trustee since 2017, became interim president while the Board of Trustees began a search for a permanent successor.

== Campus ==
Until 2021, American University of Afghanistan had two campuses which were known as the West Campus and the International Campus. The campuses were located on Darulaman Road in Kabul, Afghanistan. The West campus operated on the site of the former American International School of Kabul. A large tract of land immediately across the road from the current campus, and running south to the Dar-ul-Amman Palace was being developed for campus expansion, until the Taliban takeover.

Principal academic buildings on the campus included the Azizi Building, which housed classrooms and faculty offices; the Bayat Building, which housed administration offices and classrooms; and the Multi Purpose Academic Building, which housed the Bernice Nachman Marlowe Library, science and computer labs, and classrooms. This building also contained the Abdul Madjid Zabuli real-presence videoconferencing system. Other buildings on campus included the Michael Bayat Gymnasium, the Faculty Office Buildings, two Masjids (for men and women), and the AUAF Cafeteria.

The International Campus was built later and served as the main campus for day to day university classes. The Women Center was the main building where most of the classes and offices were located alongside the major Auditorium. In 2019, Bayat IT center also opened which mainly housed IT classes and labs for the Computer Science department. There were branches of Yummy fast food on the second floor of the Women Center and a Finest supermarket Branch near the Football field.

According to the President of AUAF, Ian Bickford, "We spent the last two days on campus trying to remove any student records and employee records from the campus, and that included destroying files and hard drives. My colleagues and I and some of the students who remained in the last day stood around a bonfire that was made of our campus records." As of 2022, the buildings of the campus are intact, but no longer serve any teaching or research functions. The Taliban authorities subsequently repurposed the former AUAF institution in Kabul. In 2025, they announced the new name, Afghan International Islamic University, and their plans for a new campus in the Deh Sabz district.

=== International Center for Afghan Women's Economic Development ===
The International Center for Afghan Women's Economic Development (ICAWED), also known as the Women's Center, was dedicated to advancing the role of women in Afghanistan's economy, located at the American University of Afghanistan (AUAF) in Kabul. ICAWED was established in 2013.

=== Business Innovation Hub ===
Business Innovation Hub (BIH) was founded in November 2013 as an initiative of the American University of Afghanistan. BIH was located at the International campus of AUAF.
