= Sharif Fayez =

Afghan academic and politician (1946–2019)

Sharif Fayez, also known as Mohammed Sharif Fayez (1946 – February 8, 2019), was an academic in Afghanistan, who also served as the country's Minister of Higher Education from 22 December 2001 to 2007. He has written several English and Persian books.

Fayez was born in 1946 in Herat Province of Afghanistan. He received his Ph.D. in American literature from the University of Arizona in 1978. He lived most of his life in the United States due to the wars in Afghanistan.

After the removal of the Islamic Emirate of Afghanistan (Taliban government), Fayez returned to Afghanistan and was chosen as the country's Minister of Higher Education during the December 2001 Bonn Conference in Germany, as a close ally of Ismail Khan, with whom he is linked by marriage. He later founded the American University of Afghanistan (AUAF). He served as head of the AUAF for its first two years, from 2004 to 2006.

== Death ==
Fayez died on February 8, 2019, reportedly from a heart attack. He was 73 years old at the time of death. He was buried in the famous Abdullah Ansari Shrine Complex.
