= Kabul–Darulaman Tramway =

Dismantled Afghanistan tramway linking Kabul and Darulaman

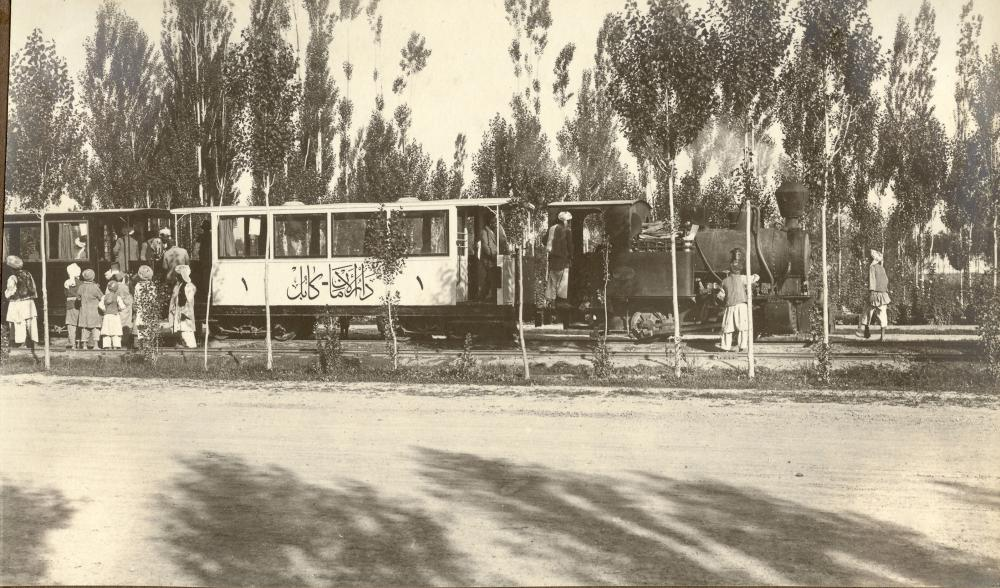
First railway from Darulaman to Kabul without any government representatives

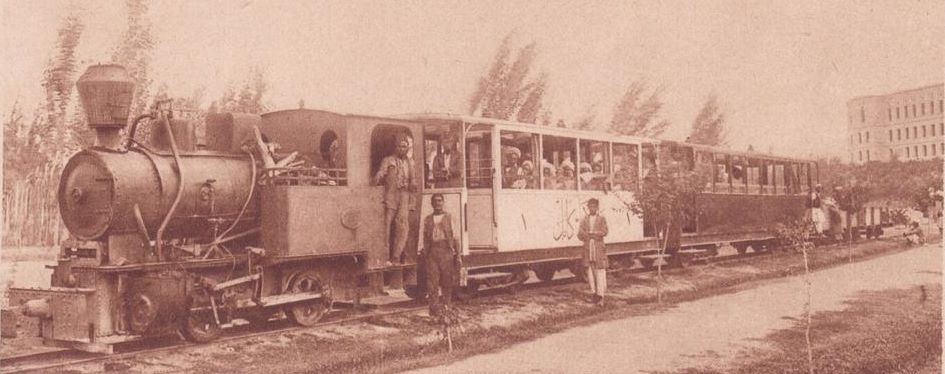
The 7 km long railway between Kabul and Darul-Aman

The Kabul–Darulaman Tramway was a 2 ft 6 in (762 mm) narrow gauge railway in Afghanistan. It was constructed after Emir Amanullah gave the order in 1923, and was 8 kilometres (5.0 mi) long, running from Kabul to the planned city of Darulaman.

== Historical accounts ==
The December 1922 issue of The Locomotive magazine mentions "Travellers from Afghanistan state a railway is being laid down for a distance of some six miles from Kabul to the site of the new city of Darulaman, and also that some of the rolling stock for it is being manufactured in the Kabul workshops." The August 1928 issue of The Locomotive mentions "the only railway at present in Afghanistan is five miles long, between Kabul and Darulaman." Three small steam locomotives were acquired from Henschel of Kassel in Germany.

== Closure ==
The tramway closed (date unknown), and was dismantled in the 1940s, but the locomotives are preserved at the National Museum of Afghanistan in Darulaman.

== Locomotives ==
There were three small Henschel 0-4-0T steam locomotives, all three of which survive in a museum in Kabul (as of 2002). However the third locomotive (Henschel 19691 of 1923) might possibly be a different gauge and thus from a different railway all together. The other two locomotives (Henchel 19680 and 19681 of 1923) were originally found in the former engine shed of the Kabul and Darulaman Railway and show green paint (although heavily faded and largely gone). The most intact locomotive being Henchel 19681 and is displayed on a special built length of track under cover. Under a separate covered area are the other two locomotives along with parts from the coaches used on the railway such as bogies and frames.

== See also ==
- Rail transport in Afghanistan
