= Bagh-e Bala Palace =

Palace in Kabul, Afghanistan

Coordinates: 34°32′24″N 69°07′48″E

- پارک باغ بالا
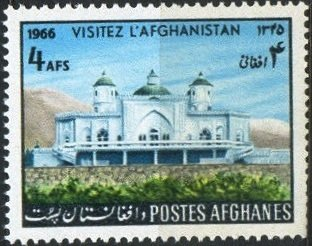
- A 1966 Afghan postage stamp showing the Bagh-e Bala Palace

General information
- Type: Palace
- Location: Kabul, Afghanistan
- Estimated completion: 1893

The Bagh-e Bala Palace (Dari: پارک باغ بالا) is a former royal palace of Emir Abdur Rahman Khan, which is located near the famous Inter-Continental Hotel in Kabul, Afghanistan. It sits on a historical hilltop in the Bagh-e Bala (High Garden) park around the Karte Parwan neighborhood of the city. The palace had a large pool (added in the 1970s) and is surrounded by pine trees. The palace is now part of a new amusement park being developed by Habibullah Zazai Park.

== History ==
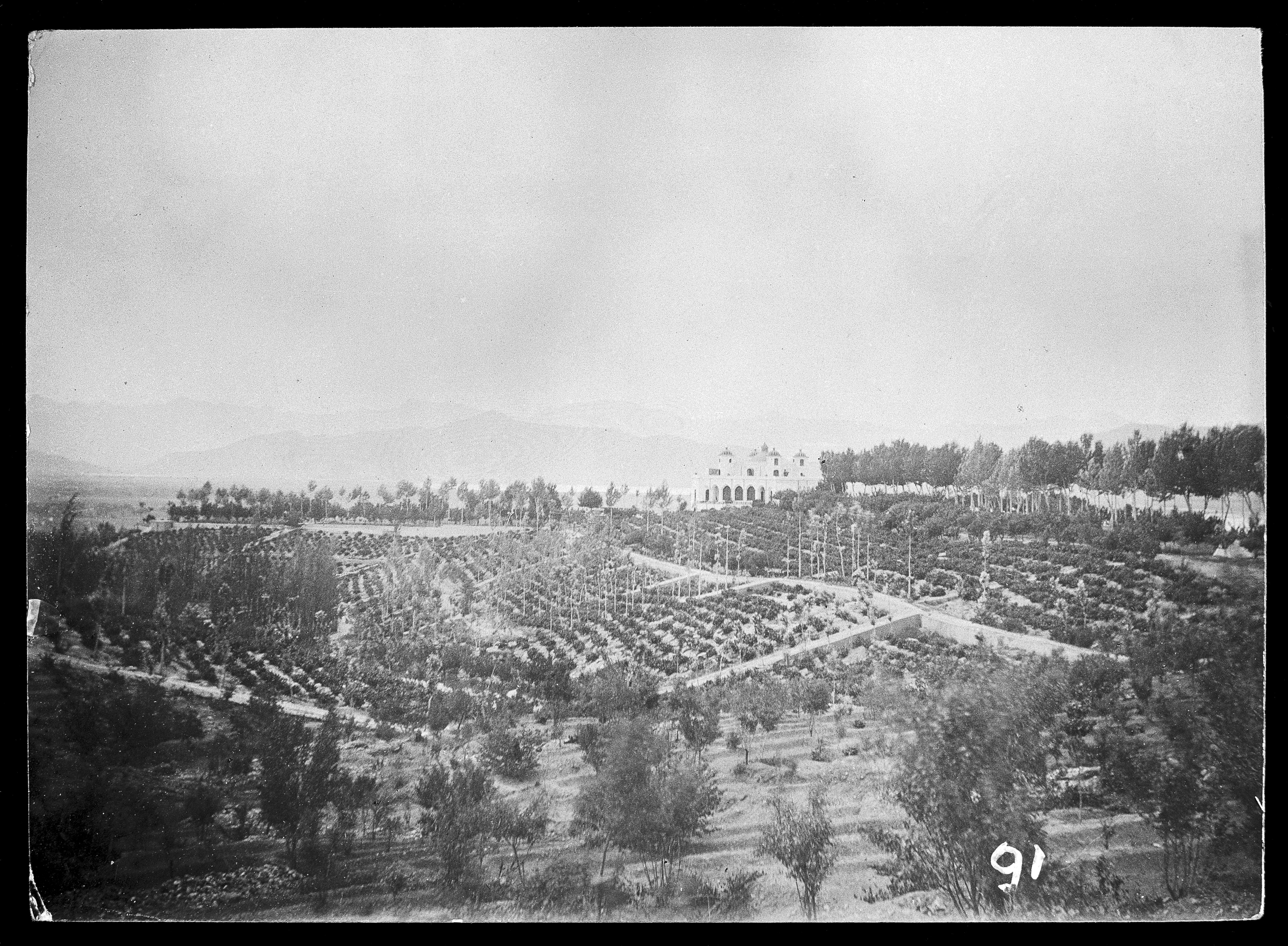
The palace visible in the distance (1890s)

Bagh-e Bala Palace was built in 1893 by Emir Abdur Rahman Khan as one of his residences, and is the place where died in 1901. The site was a historical garden dating to the time of the Mughals. It was then used as a castle under Emir Habibullah Khan, and then as a guesthouse.

In 1919 it housed the National Museum of Afghanistan before the collection was moved elsewhere, and the palace became a military house under King Ghazi Amanullah Khan. After being abandoned by 1930, it was renovated and turned into a restaurant under King Zahir Shah in the 1960s. The area around the palace (Bagh-e Bala) has become a large amusement park in recent years.

The palace survived the civil war of the 1990s. It was renovated again in the 2000s and 2010s, with its interior preserved to look like the original 19th century design, but it is currently not in official use. American historians Nancy and Louis Dupree married here in 1966.

== Gallery ==
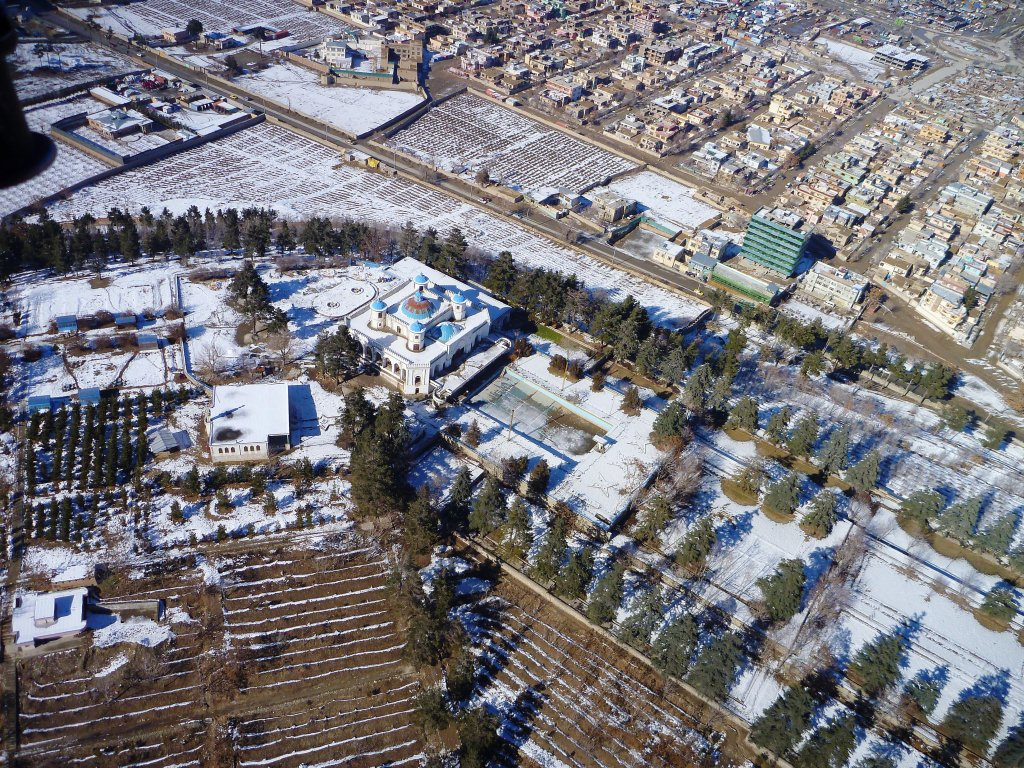
Aerial view of the palace in 2013

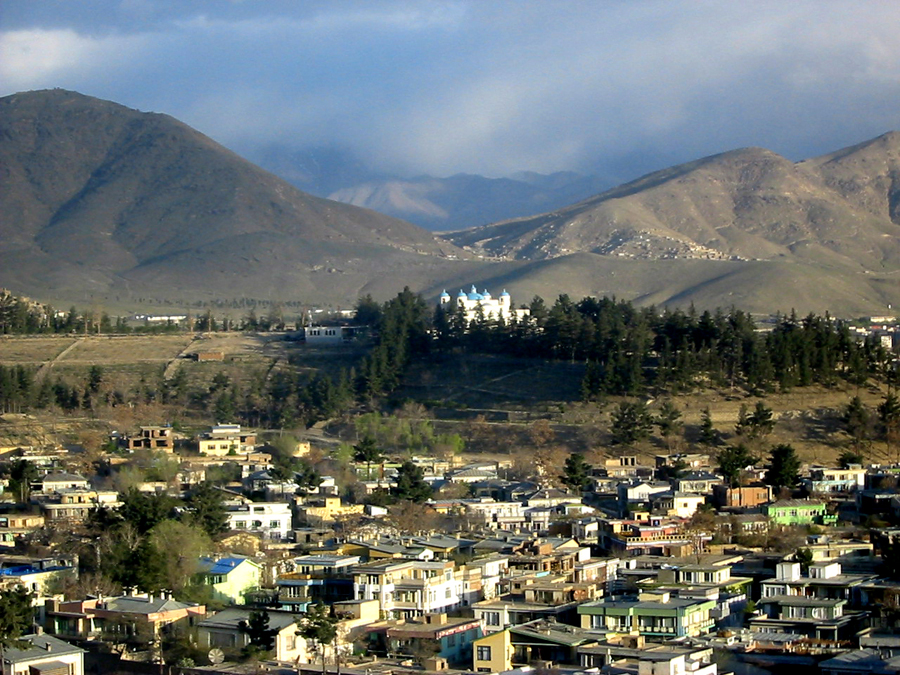
Bagh-e Bala visible in the distance (2006)

== See also ==
- Darul Aman Palace
- Tajbeg Palace
- Chihilsitoon Palace
- Bala Hissar
