= Darul Aman Palace =

Palace in Afghanistan

Coordinates: 34°27′54.78″N 69°7′9.47″E

- کاخ دارالامان - د دارالامان ماڼۍ
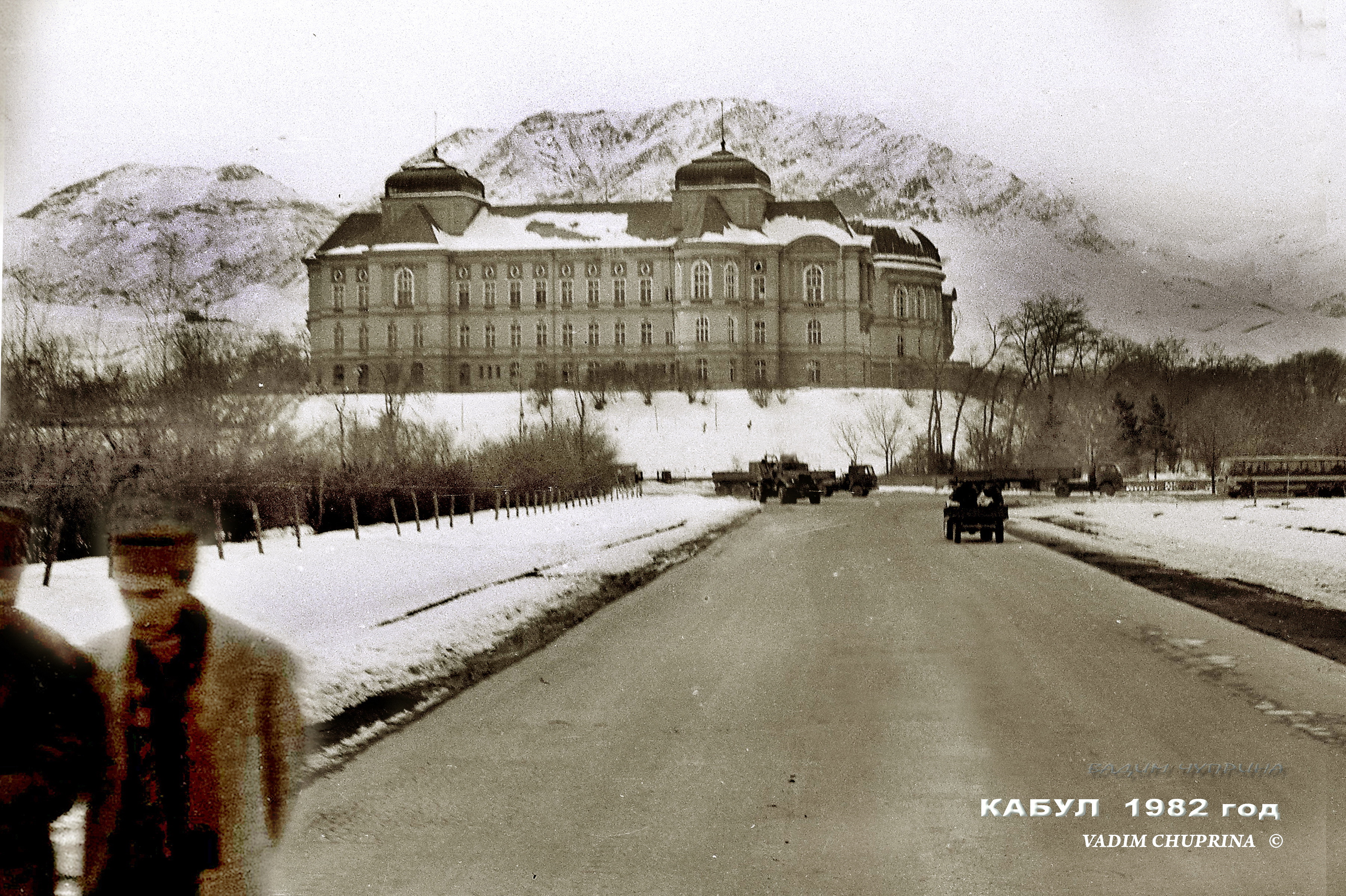
- The palace in January 1982, which was heavily damaged in the 1990s and fully restored in recent years

General information
- Status: Reconstructed in 2019 on the 100th Independence Day of Afghanistan
- Type: Palace
- Architectural style: Neoclassical
- Location: Kabul, Afghanistan
- Construction started: 1925
- Completed: 1927
- Renovated: 2016-2019
- Renovation cost: $10-20 million

Height
- Height: 107 ft (33 m)

Technical details
- Material: Brick; Marble (spiral staircases)
- Floor count: 3

Design and construction
- Architects: Walter Harten; A. Godard; M. Godard

Other information
- Number of rooms: 150

Darul Aman Palace (Pashto: د دارالامان ماڼۍ; Dari: کاخ دارالامان; 'Abode of Peace' or, in a double meaning, 'Abode of Aman[ullah]') is a three-story palace located in Darulaman locality, about 16 km (9.9 miles) south-west of the center of Kabul, Afghanistan. Surrounding the palace are the National Assembly, the National Museum of Afghanistan and the Afghan International University.

The 150-room Darul Aman Palace was originally built in the 1920s, during the reign of Amanullah Khan. He reigned as Emir of Afghanistan between February 1919 and June 1926, and as King of Afghanistan between June 1926 and January 1929. The palace was severely damaged during the 1990s civil war. However, between 2016 and 2020, the palace was renovated and restored to its former glory. Most work was completed for the 100th anniversary of Afghan independence, which was on 19 August 2019. The site is open to the public and tourists.

== History ==
Construction of the Darul Aman Palace began in the early 1920s as part of the endeavours of Emir Amanullah Khan to modernise Afghanistan. In June 1926, Amanullah proclaimed himself as King of Afghanistan. The palace was to be part of the new capital city called Darulaman, connected to Kabul by a narrow gauge railway. Amanullah Khan invited 22 architects from Germany and France to build the palace. The palace is considered to be a testimony of the Afghan-German ties, as it was designed by German engineer Walter Harten and his team of engineers.

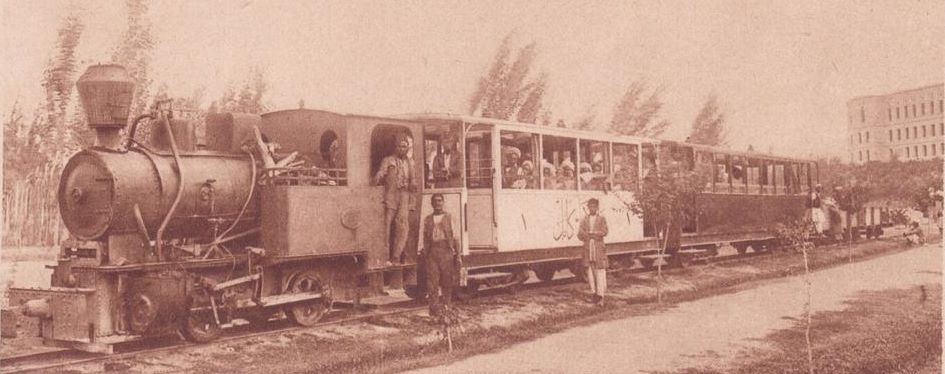
The Kabul–Darulaman Tramway in 1923

The palace is an imposing neoclassical building on a hilltop overlooking a flat, dusty valley in the western part of the Afghan capital. Designed by French architects A. Godard and M. Godard, as well as German architects, it was one of the first buildings in the country to get central heating and running water. The Swedish memoir writer Rora Asim Khan, who lived in Afghanistan with her Afghan husband in 1926–27, describe in her memoirs how she was invited to the palace by Queen Soraya to describe Western lifestyle and customs to the Queen and the King's mother Intended as the seat of a future parliament, the building remained unused and partially complete for many years after religious conservatives under Habibullah Kalakani forced King Amanullah from power in 1929, and halted his reforms. In later years it served as the medical school for Kabul University, as well a warehouse, and the seat of several smaller ministries.

The building was gutted by fire on 14 December 1968, and was afterwards restored to house the Ministry of Defence during the 1970s and 1980s. In the Communist coup of 1978, the building was once more set on fire. Much of the building was damaged by tank fire during Shahnawaz Tanai's failed coup attempt on 6 March 1990. It was once again severely damaged during the 1990s Afghan Civil War, as rival Mujahideen factions fought for control of Kabul. Heavy shelling by the Mujahideen left the palace a gutted ruin, including the garage containing the vehicles of the former King which were removed and used as target practice, all ultimately being destroyed. It was mostly used as a refugee settlement and a nomad camp until the early 2000s, when it became a battalion headquarters for the Afghan National Army. After clashes in western Kabul between Kuchi refugees attempting to resettle on their ancestral lands and local Hazara residents in 2010 the government resettled Kuchis community in the ruins of Darul Aman, where they were forced to live in destitution for months.

In 2005, a plan was unveiled to refurbish the palace for use as the seat of Afghanistan's future parliament. It was to be funded primarily by private donations from foreigners and wealthy Afghans. In April 2012, a number of government compounds around the palace were targeted for attacks by Taliban-led insurgent groups. Eventually it was decided to develop a new building opposite the palace to house the parliament under a grant, provided by India. Construction was completed in 2015.

In the Spring of 2016, work began on a 16 to 20 million dollar restoration project, intended to renovate the palace in time for the centenary of Afghanistan's full independence in 1919. Nearly 600 tons of debris was initially removed from the 150-room building and by the spring of 2017, workers were taking down plaster and concrete from the inner walls. Over 80 engineers and architects were involved in the project, of which 25 percent were female. By July 2019, most of the major reconstruction work on the palace was completed.

On 18 April 2020, an opening ceremony was held as the palace was used as a temporary COVID-19 isolation and treatment center with 200 beds during the COVID-19 pandemic in Afghanistan.

== Architecture ==
The palace is a U-shaped brick building, built in a European neoclassical style. It has 3 floors with 150 rooms, including a semi-circular main hall. Its highest point is around 33 m (108 ft) above ground level. There are four domed towers on the roof. The galleries on the third floor of the southern facade are decorated with a number of Corinthian columns. Each floor is connected by marble spiral staircases.

== Gallery: Darul Aman Palace before renovation ==
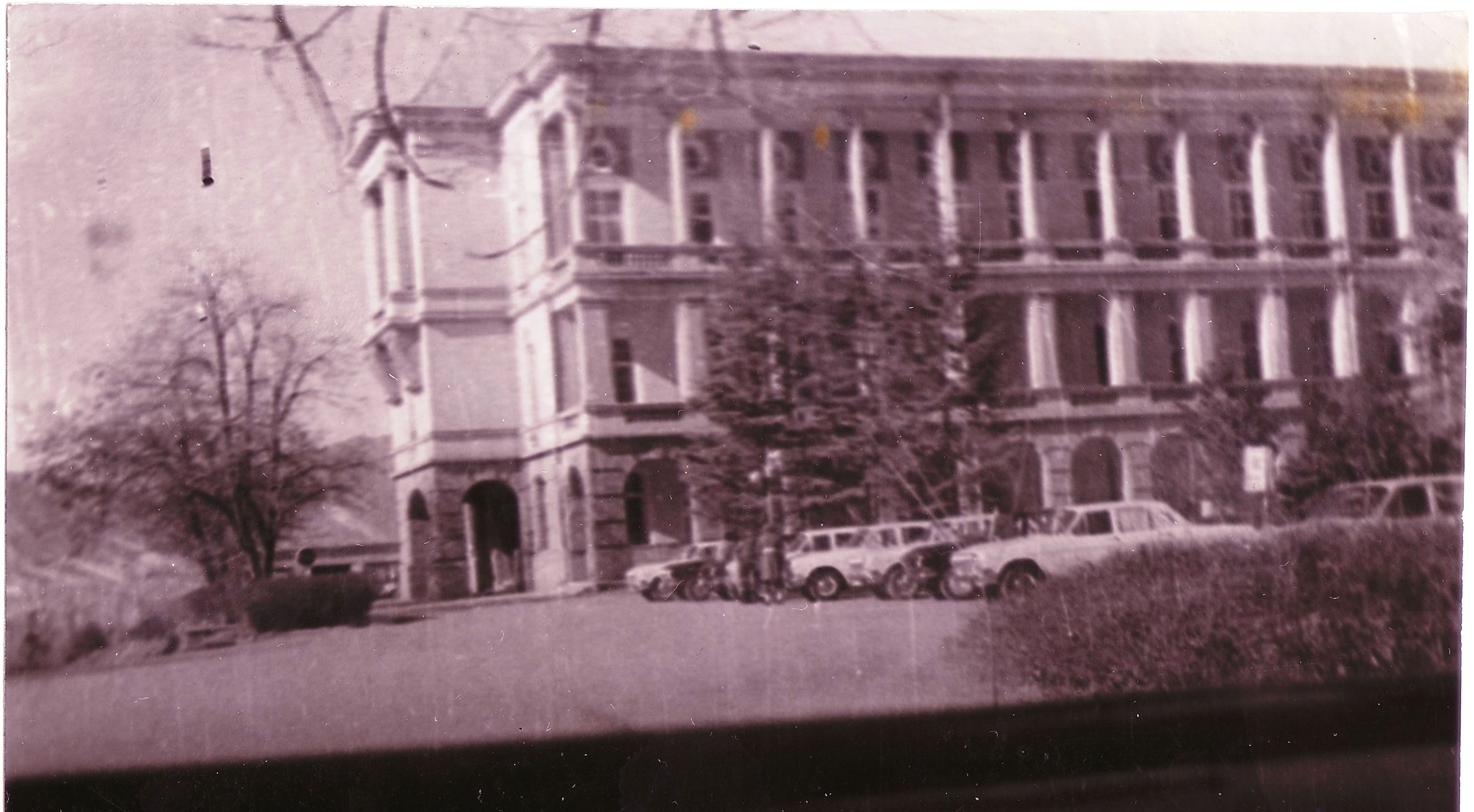
The palace in 1986

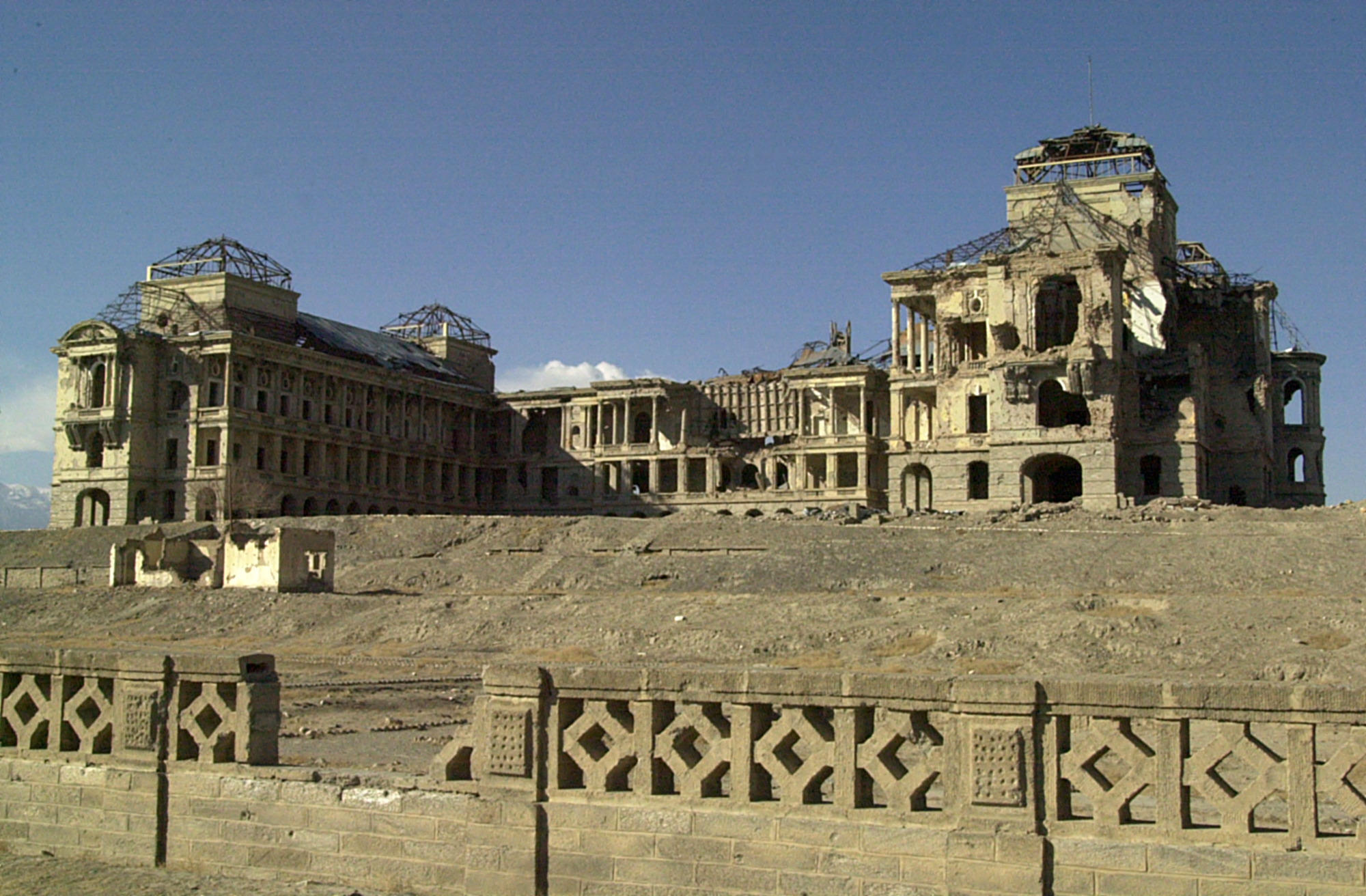
2002: The southern facade

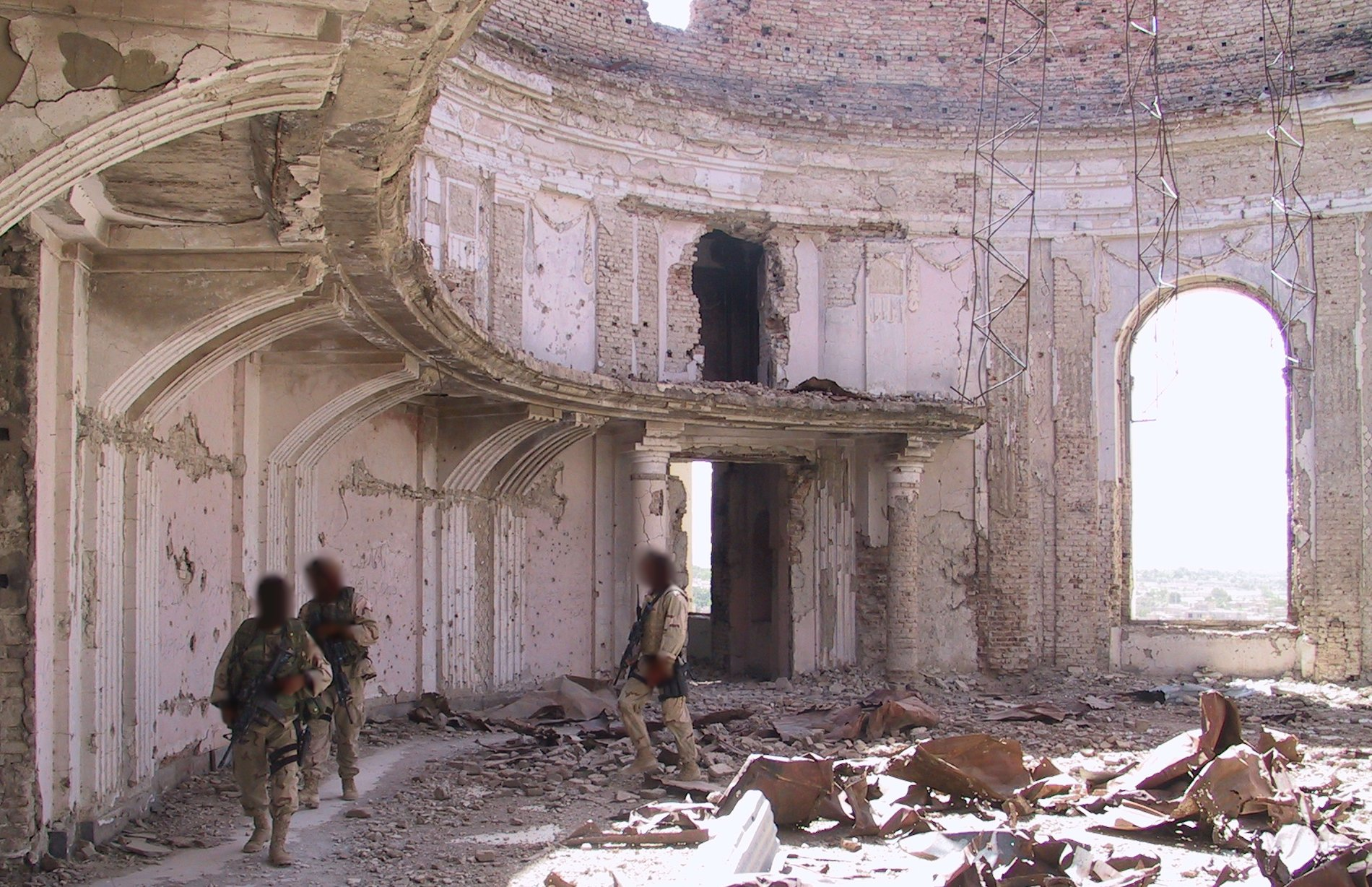
2002: US commandos patrolling a bombed out room

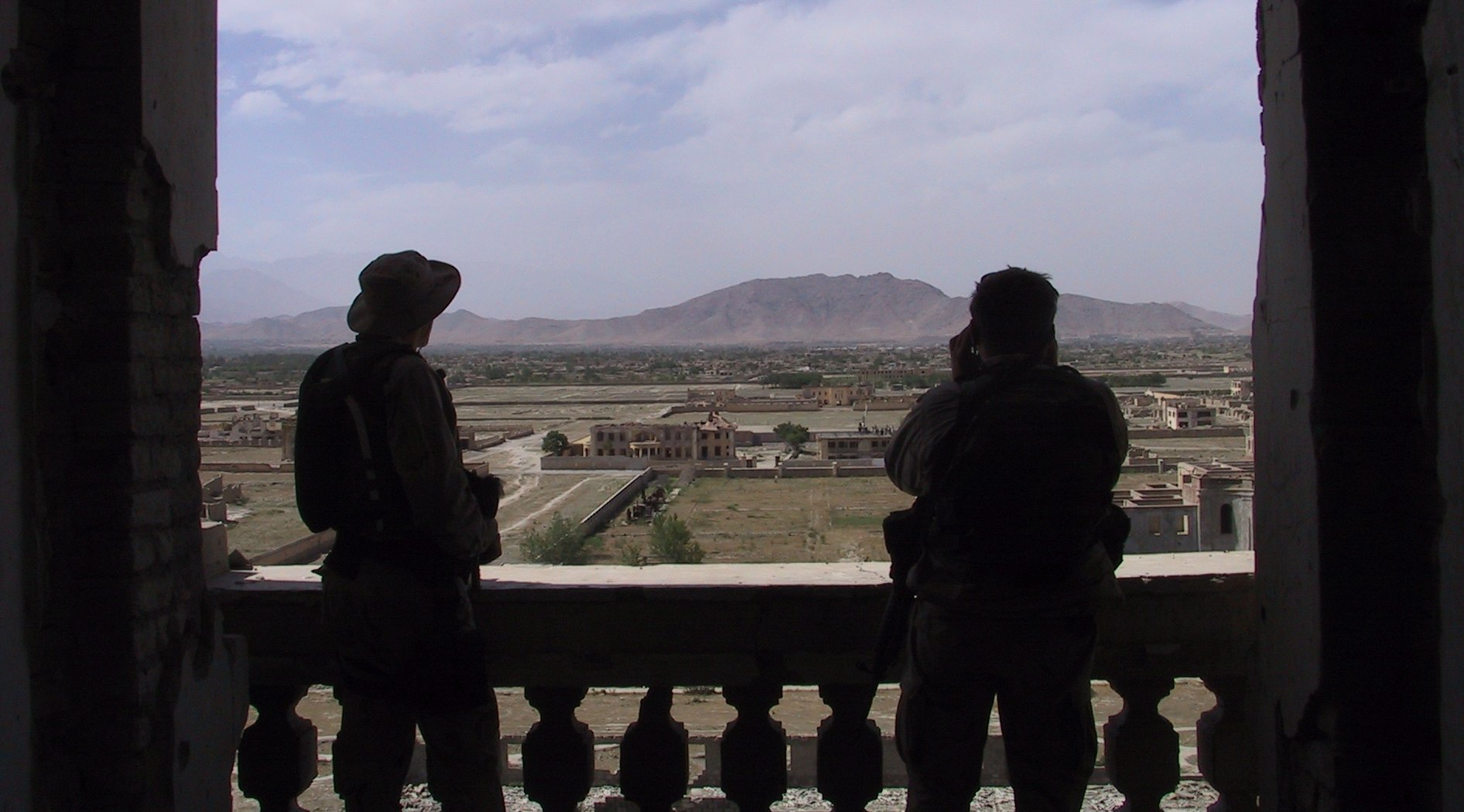
2002: Two US Special Forces soldiers view Kabul looking north

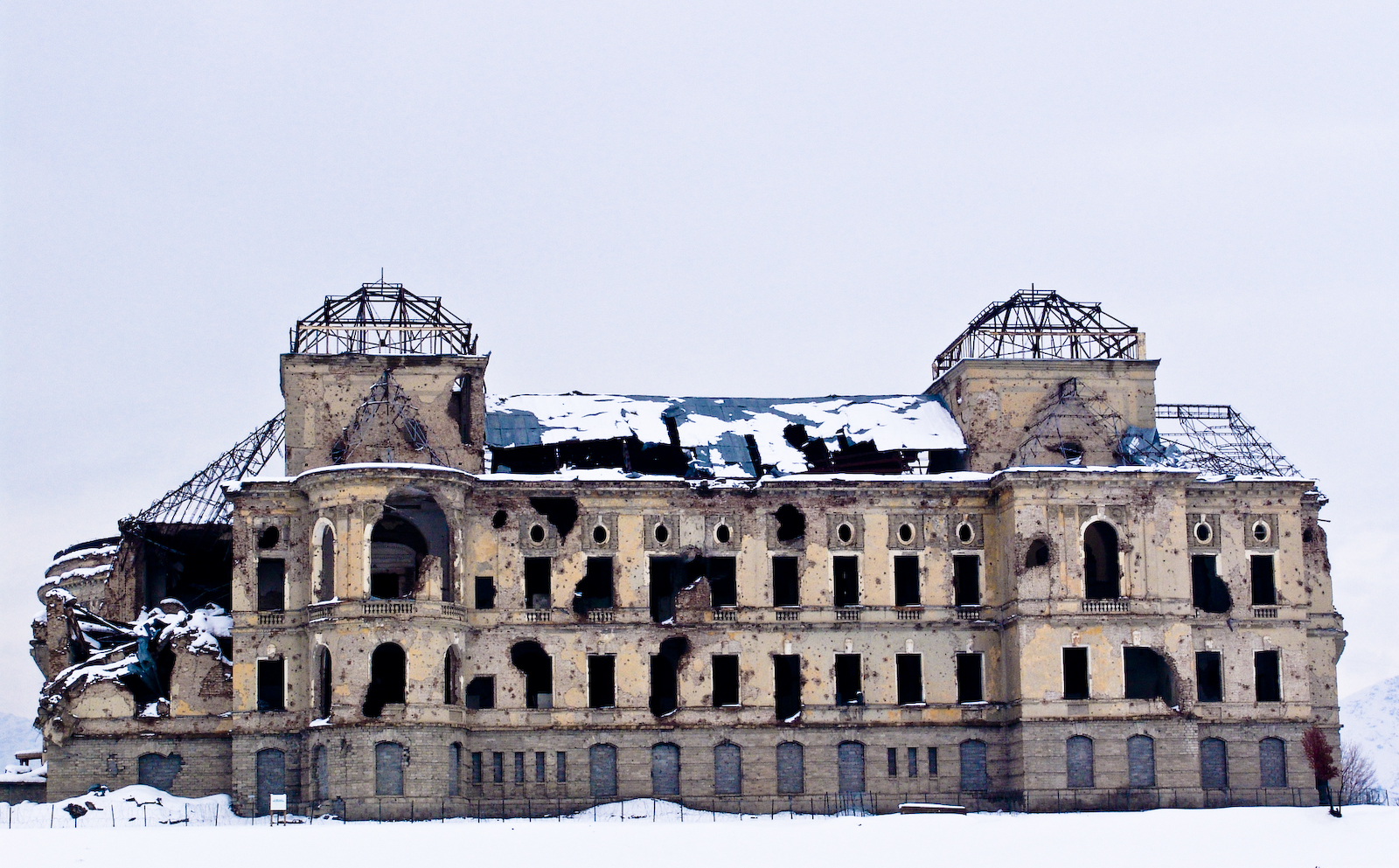
2005

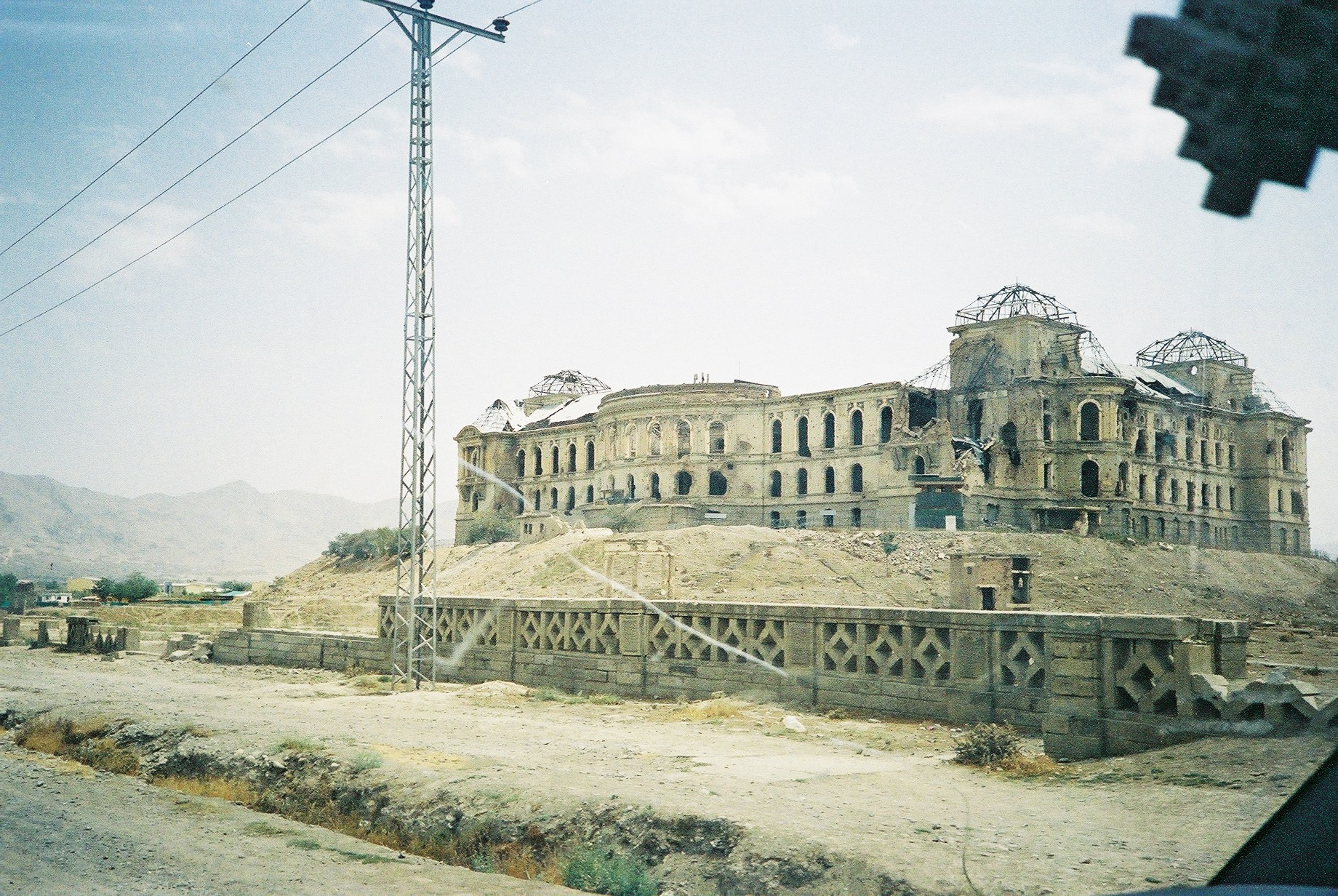
2006: Northern elevation showing shelling damage from mujahideen fighting for Kabul

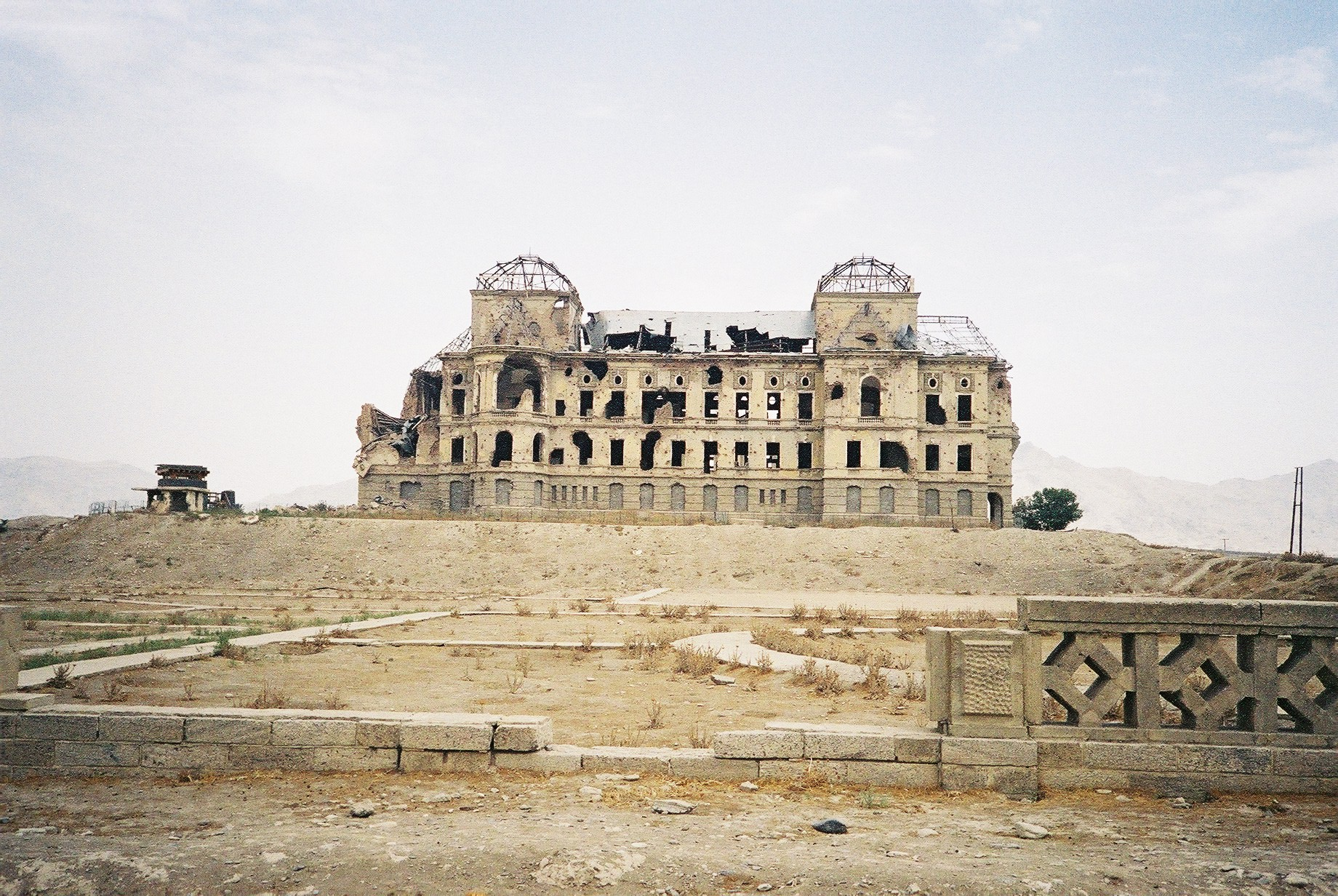
2006: Western elevation

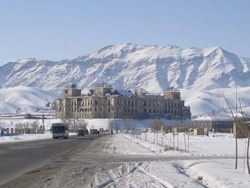
2007: After heavy snowfall

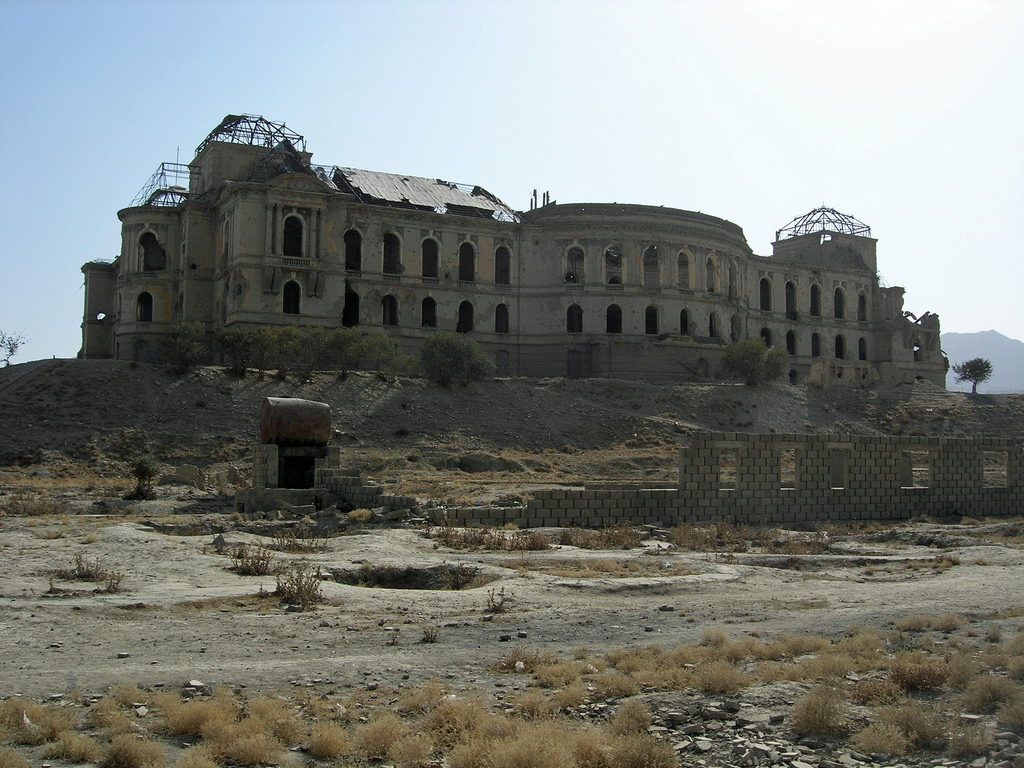
2008: Facade

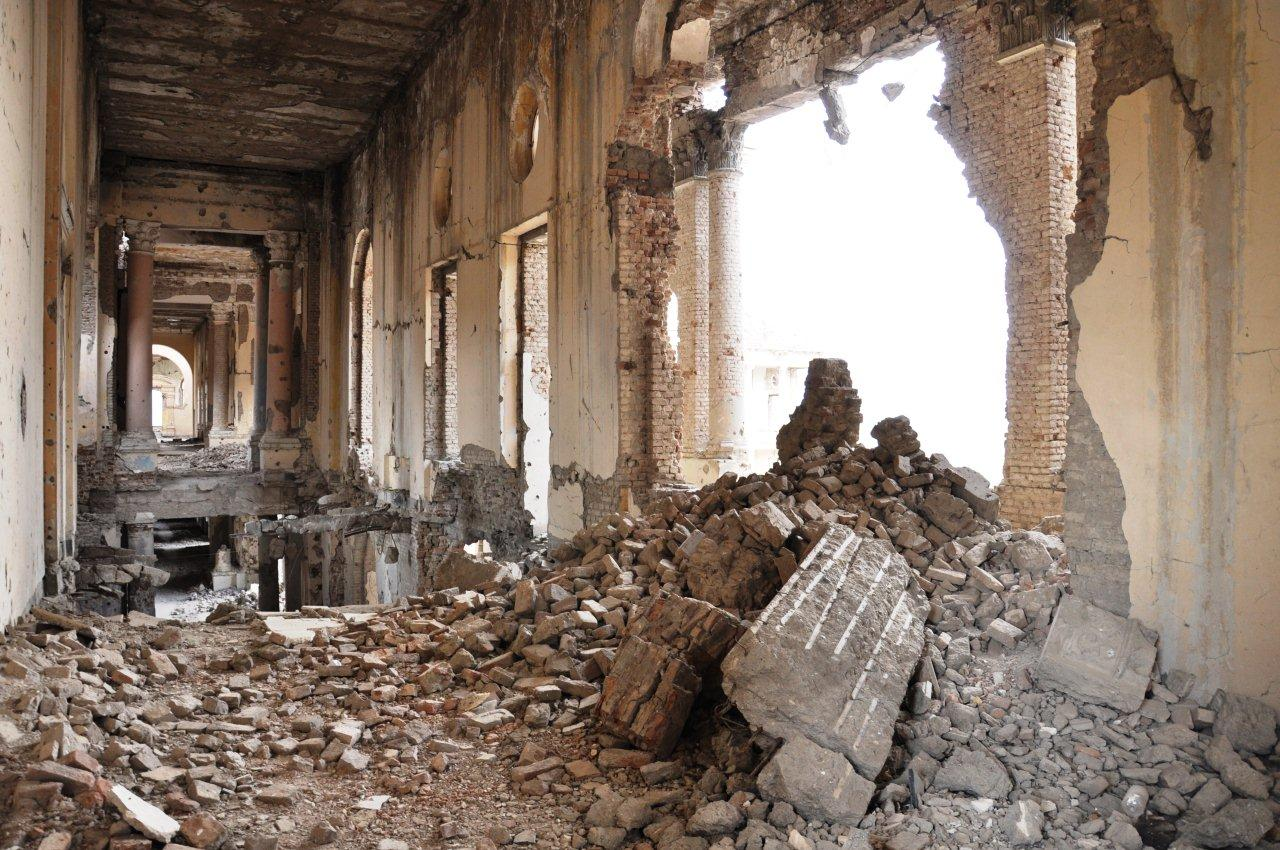
July 2010: The interior

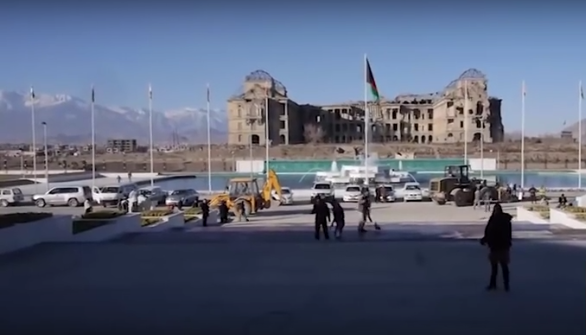
December 2015: View from the National Assembly Building with the palace under preliminary reconstruction

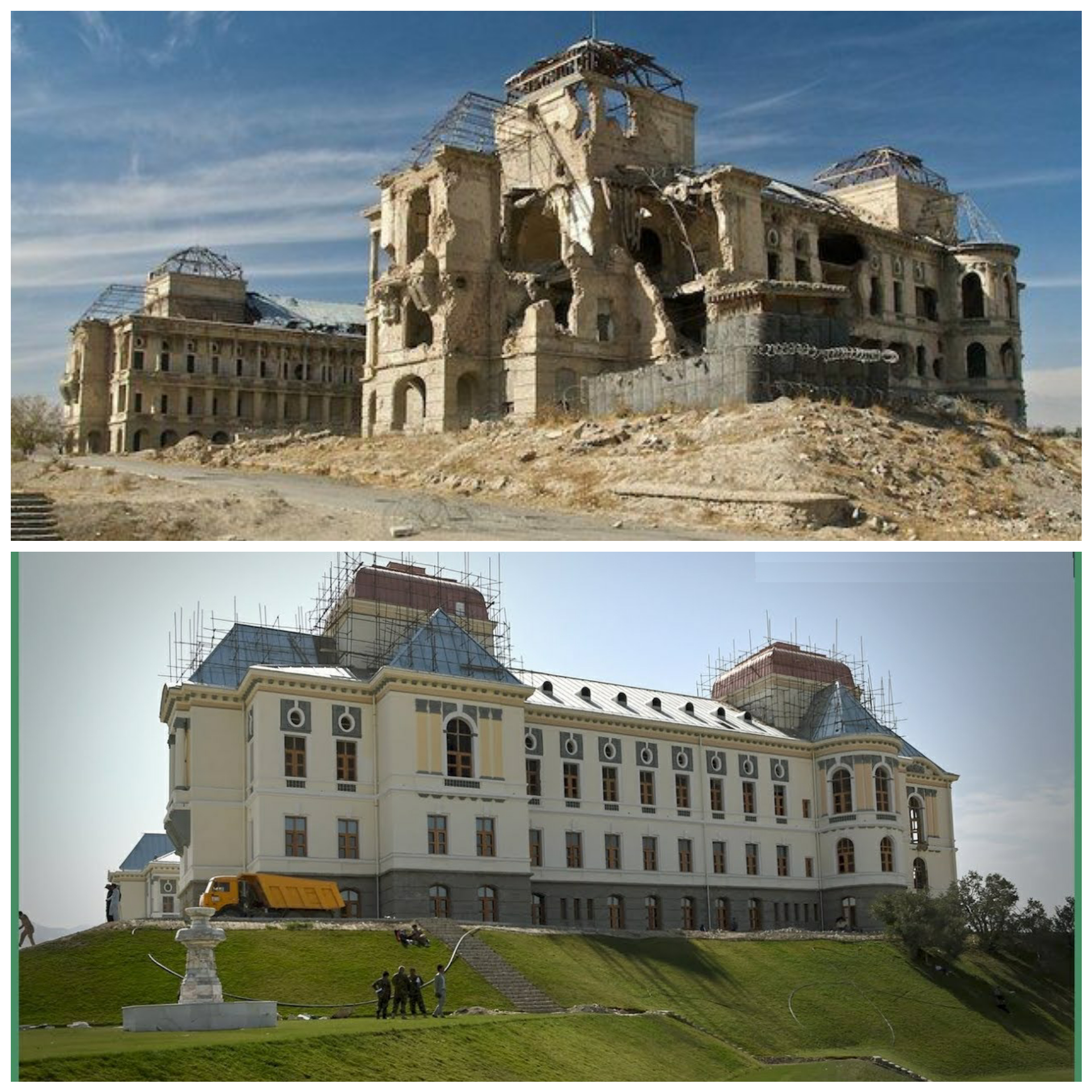
Darul Aman Palace reconstruction

== See also ==
- Aman (Islam), Islamic term for offering safety, protection, safe conduct, or pardon to enemies
- Tajbeg Palace, located on a nearby hill and built as a residence for Amanullah, his wife, Queen Soraya, and their family.
- Bagh-e Bala Palace, a palace built as a leisure home for Abdur Rahman Khan in 1893
