= Darulaman =

Darulaman دارالامان
- Neighborhood of Kabul
- Coordinates: 34°28′N 69°07′E
- Country: Afghanistan
- Province: Kabul Province

Darulaman (Pashto (Note: Pashto pronunciation: [d̪ɑ.ɾu.lɑ.mɑn]); Dari (Note: Dari pronunciation: [d̪ɑː.ɾʊ.lɑː.mɑ́ːn]): دارالامان) is a locality on the south-western fringes of Kabul, Afghanistan, forming part of District 6. The suburb was a planned city built in the 1920s during the reign of Amanullah Khan. Amanullah sought to turn Darulaman into a new modern capital city, and hired German companies and engineers to build roads, bridges and other infrastructure. The construction of the suburb amounted to an estimated cost of ten million rupees, which was a third of the state's annual income at the time. Thus, Darulaman and other ambitious projects were crucial factors behind Amanullah's tax reforms to increase revenues.

The area is connected to Kabul some 16 km away via Darulaman Road, a long straight boulevard, which has been described by one analyst as "perhaps the most exquisite street of the capital Kabul". A narrow-gauge railway, the Kabul-Darulaman Tramway, was also built and operated through this boulevard.

Numerous buildings and palaces were built there, including the Darul Aman Palace, National Museum of Afghanistan, and Tajbeg Palace. However, in 1929, Amanullah Khan abdicated after Habibullah Kalakani took over authority. As a result, his planned city was never fully completed and it never became a capital city. The existing buildings continued to be in official use. From 2015-2021, the Afghan parliament building was based in Darulaman. A township called Omid-e Sabz was built and opened in the 2010s about 3 km west from Darulaman.

== See also ==
- Tourism in Afghanistan
