= Kabul =

Capital and the largest city of Afghanistan

Kabul کابل
- Capital and largest city
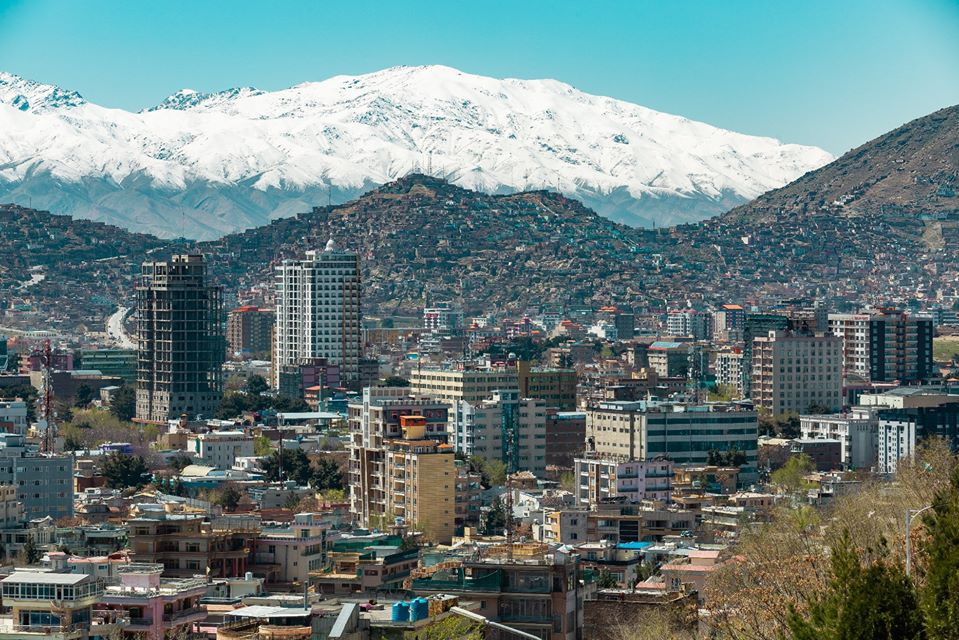
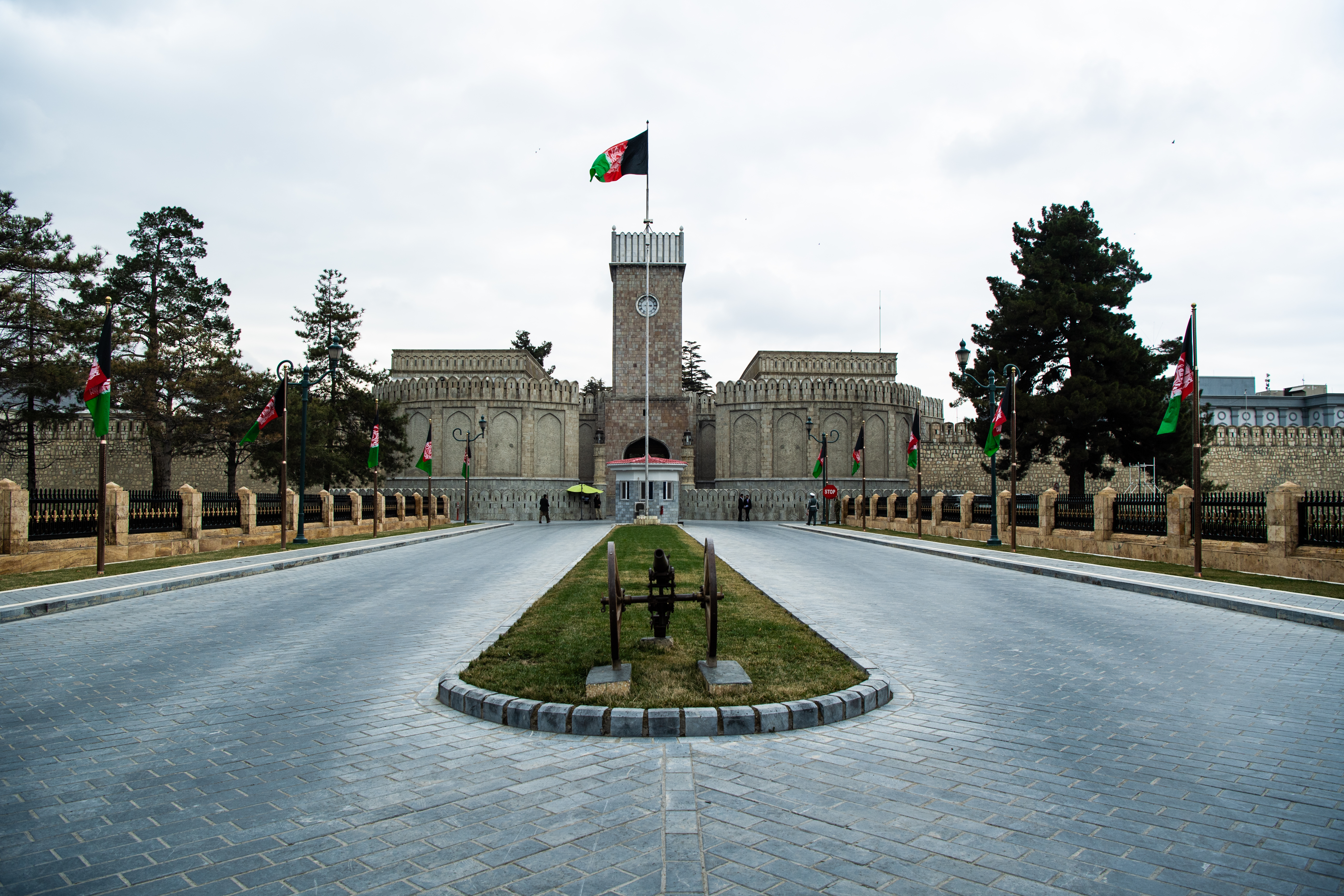
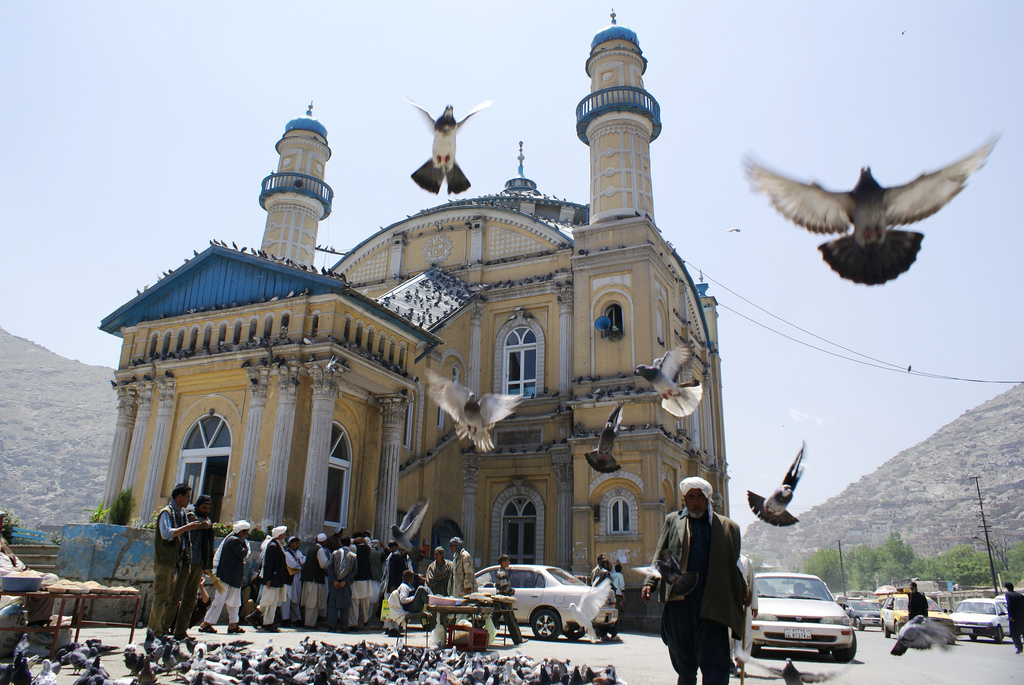
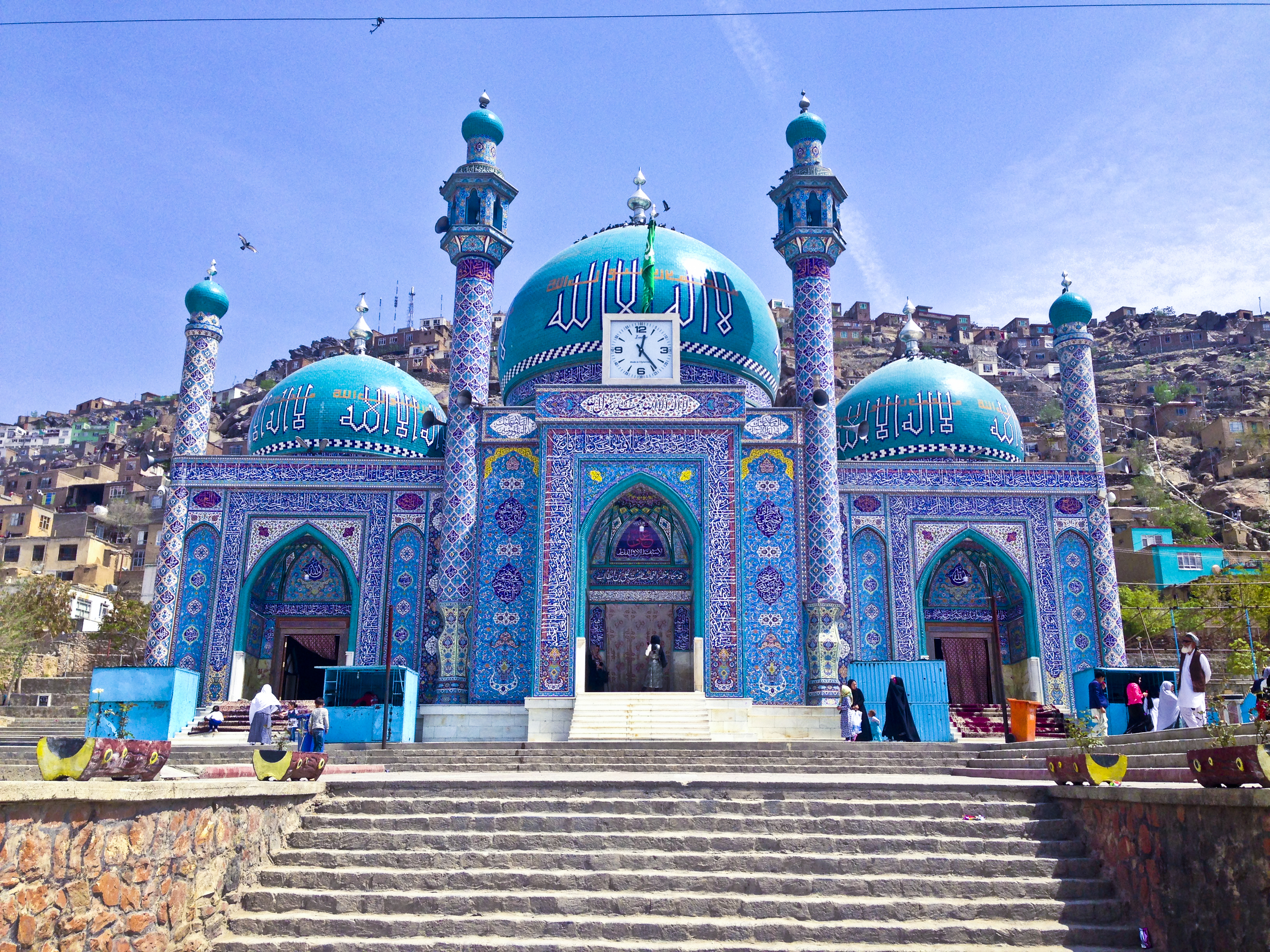
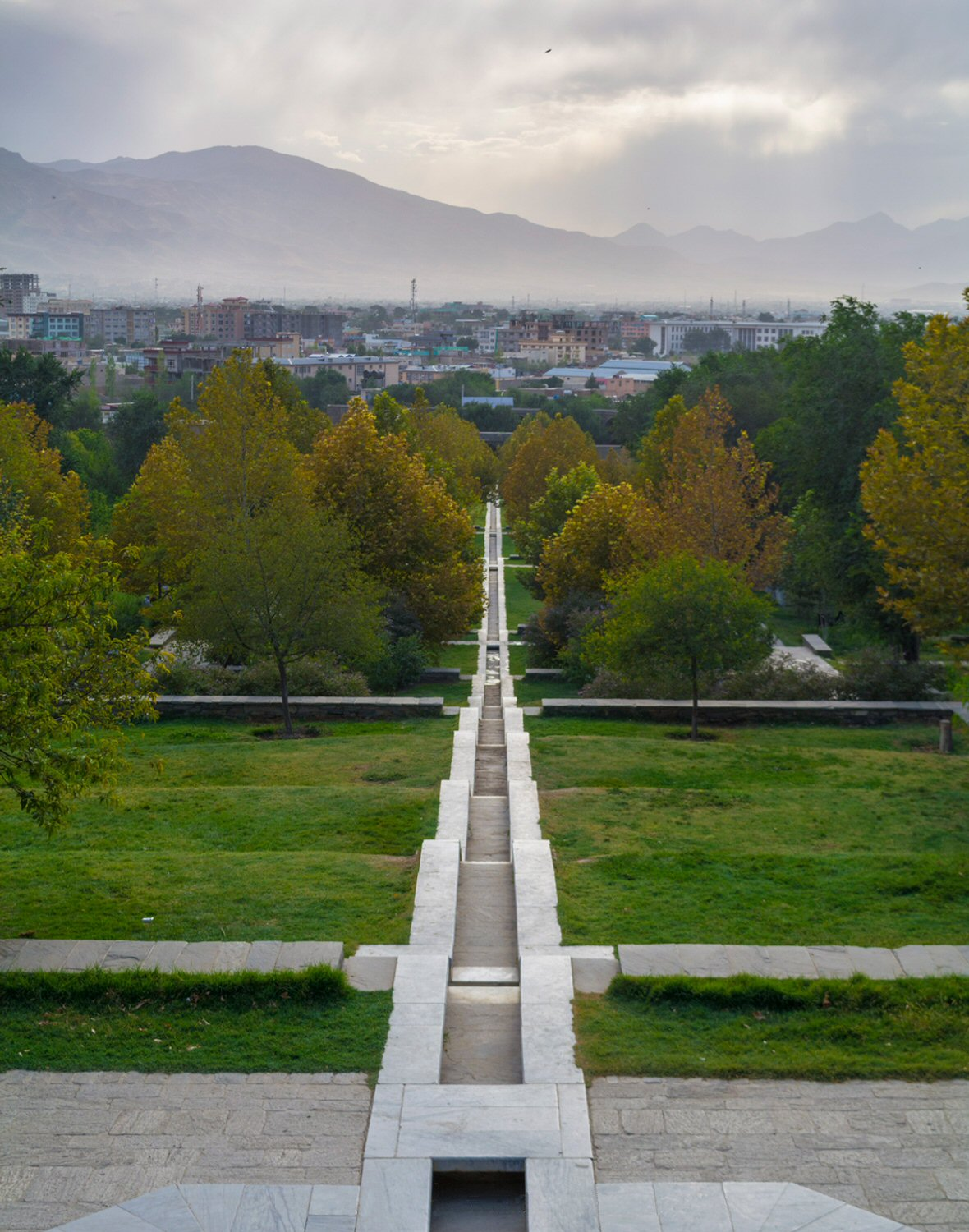
- Shahr-e Naw The Arg Shah-Do Shamshira Mosque Sakhi Shrine Gardens of Babur

- Flag Coat of arms
- Nicknames: The Paris of Central Asia
- Location within Afghanistan Location within Asia
- Coordinates: 34°31′31″N 69°10′42″E
- Country: Afghanistan
- Province: Kabul
- No. of districts: 22
- No. of Gozars: 630
- Capital formation: 1776

Government
  - Type: Municipality
  - Mayor: Mawlawi Abdul Rashid

Area
  - Land: 1,049 km^{2} (405 sq mi)
  - Metro: 4,524 km^{2} (1,747 sq mi)
- Elevation: 1,791 m (5,876 ft)

Population (2025)
  - Capital and largest city: 5,333,284
  - Rank: 1st in Afghanistan
  - Density: 12,920/km^{2} (33,500/sq mi)
  - Urban: 5,333,284
- Demonyms: Kabuli
- Time zone: UTC+04:30 (Afghanistan Time)
- Postal code: 10XX
- Area code: (+93) 20
- ISO 3166 code: AF-KBL
- Climate: BSk
- Website: km.gov.af

Kabul (Note: English pronunciation: /ˈkɑːbəl/ KAH-bəl, /ˈkɑːbʊl/ KAH-buul, /ˈkɑːbuːl/ KAH-bool, /kəˈbuːl/ kə-BOOL or /kəˈbʊl/ kə-BUUL.: Pashto: کابل, romanized: Kābəl [kɑˈbəl]; Dari: کابل, romanized: Kābul [kʰɑːˈbʊ́l]) is the capital and largest city of Afghanistan. It is within the jurisdiction of Kabul District and has an estimated population of 5,333,284 people. Located in the eastern half of the country, forming part of the Kabul Province, the city is administratively divided into five zones and 22 municipal districts. The current mayor of the city is Mawlawi Abdul Rashid.

The population of Kabul primarily speaks Dari (Persian) and Pashto. Kabul has long been Afghanistan's political, cultural and economic center. Rapid urbanization has made it the country's primate city. It is located high in a narrow valley in the Hindu Kush mountain range, and is bounded by the Kabul River. At an altitude of 1,791 m (5,876 ft) above sea level, it is one of the highest capital cities in the world. The center of the city contains its oldest neighborhoods, including the areas of Bala Hisar, Deh Afghanan and Murad Khane.

Kabul is believed to be over 3,500 years old. It was mentioned at the time of the Achaemenid Persian Empire. Located at a crossroads in Asia—roughly halfway between Istanbul, in the west and Hanoi, in the east—the city is situated in a strategic location along the trade routes of Central Asia and South Asia. As a key destination on the ancient Silk Road, it is traditionally seen as the meeting point between Tartary, Hindustan and Persia. Over the centuries Kabul was claimed by various empires, including the Achaemenid, Seleucid, Greco-Bactrian, Mauryan, Kushan, Samanid, Ghaznavid, Ghorid, Khwarazmian, Timurid and others.

In the 16th century, rulers of the Mughal Empire used Kabul as their summer capital, during which time it prospered and increased in significance. It briefly came under the control of the Afsharids following Nader Shah's invasion of India, until finally becoming part of the Durrani Empire in 1747. Kabul became the capital of Afghanistan in 1776 during the reign of Timur Shah Durrani. In the 19th century the city was briefly occupied by British forces during the First and Second Anglo-Afghan wars.

Kabul is known for its historical gardens and palaces such as Arg, Bagh-e Babur, Bagh-e Bala, Chihil Sutun, Darul Aman, Tajbeg, and many more. In the second half of the 20th century, the city became a stop on the hippie trail undertaken by many Europeans and gained the nickname "Paris of Central Asia". This period of tranquility ended in 1978 with the Saur Revolution and the subsequent Soviet military intervention in 1979, which sparked a 10-year Soviet–Afghan War. The 1990s were marked by a civil war between splinter factions of the disbanded Afghan mujahideen, which destroyed much of the city. In 1996, Kabul was captured by the Taliban. The city fell to coalition forces during a United States-led invasion in 2001, and was recaptured by the Taliban in 2021 following the United States' withdrawal from Afghanistan.

== Toponymy and etymology ==
Kabul has been known by different names throughout its history. Its meaning is unknown, but it is believed to originate before the early Muslim conquests, when the city lay on trade routes between India and the Hellenistic world. In Sanskrit, it was known as Kubha, whereas Greek authors of classical antiquity referred to it as Kophen, Kophes or Koa. The Chinese traveler Xuanzang (fl. 7th century) recorded the city as Gāofù (Chinese: 高附). The name "Kabul" was first applied to the Kabul River before being applied to the area situated between the Hindu Kush and Khyber pass (present-day Pakistan). This area was also known as Kabulistan. Alexander Cunningham noted in the 19th century that Kaofu, as recorded by the Chinese was in all likelihood the name of "one of the five Yuchi or Tukhari tribes". Cunningham added that this tribe gave its name to the city after it was occupied by them in the 2nd century BC. This "supposition seems likely" as the Afghan historian Mir Ghulam Mohammad Ghobar (1898–1978) wrote that in the Avesta (sacred book of Zoroastrianism), Kabul was known as Vaekereta, whereas the Greeks of antiquity referred to it as Ortospana ("High Place"), which corresponds to the Sanskrit word Urddhastana, which was applied to Kabul. The Greek geographer Ptolemy recorded Kabul as Καβουρα (Kabura).

According to legend, a lake existed in Kabul, in the middle of which the so-called "Island of Happiness" was located, where a joyous family of musicians resided. According to this same legend, the island became accessible by the order of a king through the construction of a bridge (i.e. "pul" in Persian) made out of straw (i.e. "kah" in Persian). According to this legend the name Kabul was thus formed as a result of these two words combined, i.e. kah + pul. The Concise Oxford Dictionary of World Place Names argues that the "suggestion that the name is derived from the Arabic root qbl 'meeting' or 'receiving' is unlikely".

It remains unknown when the name "Kabul" was first applied to the city. It "came into prominence" following the destruction of Kapisa and other cities in what is present-day Afghanistan by Genghis Khan (c. 1162–1227) in the thirteenth century. The centrality of the city within the region, as well as its cultural importance as a nexus of ethnic groups in the region, caused Kabul to become known as the Paris of Central Asia in the late 20th century.

== History ==
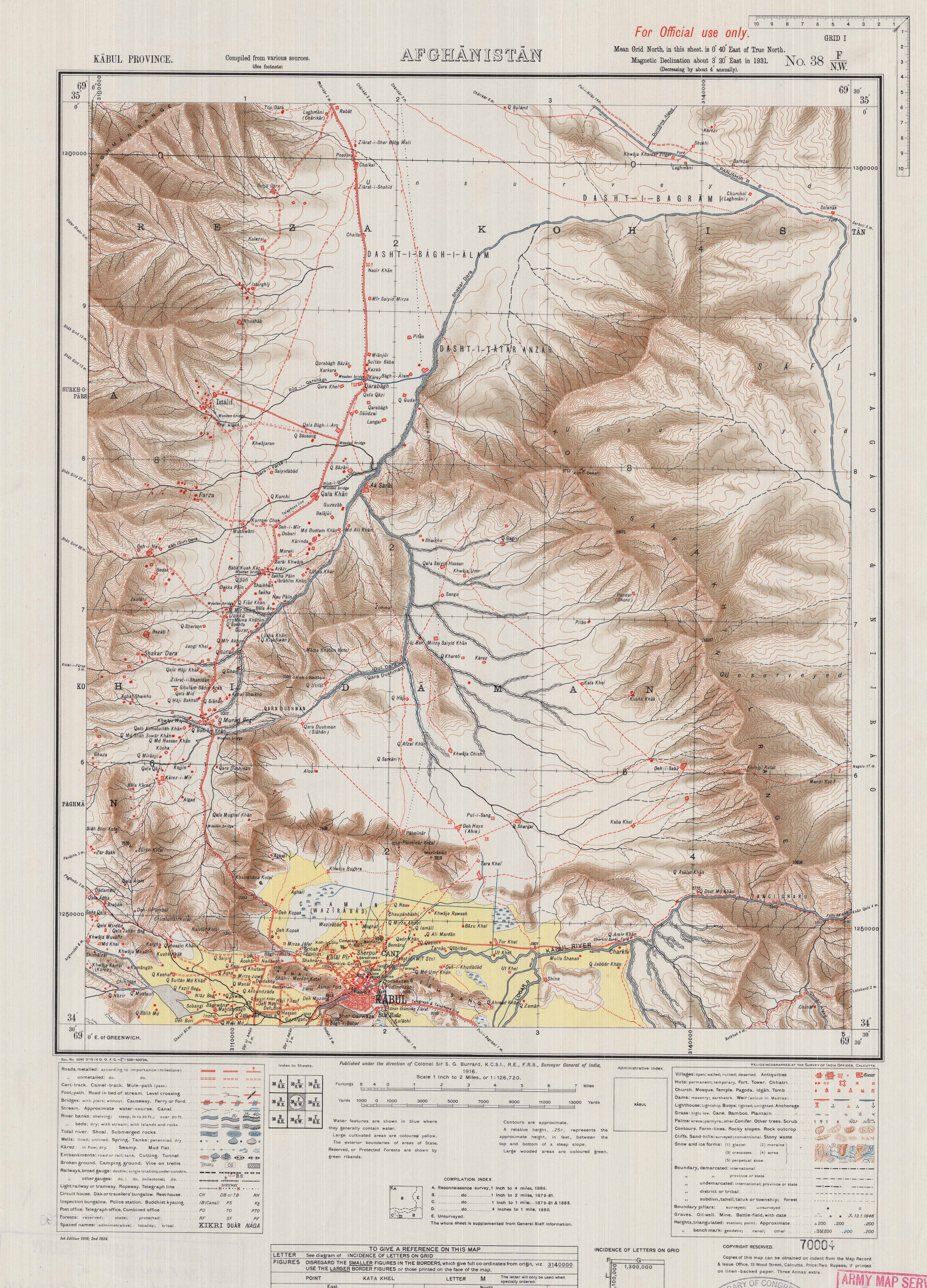
Map of Kabul and surroundings by the Survey of India, 1916

=== Antiquity ===
The origin of Kabul, who built it and when, is largely unknown. The Rigveda, composed between 2000 and 1500 BC and one of the four canonical texts of Hinduism, and the Avesta, the primary canon of texts of Zoroastrianism, refer to the Kabul River and to a settlement called Kubha.

The Kabul Valley was part of the Median Empire (c. 678–549). In 549 BC, the Median Empire was annexed by Cyrus the Great and Kabul became part the Achaemenid Empire (c. 550–330). During that period, Kabul became a center of learning for Zoroastrianism, followed by Buddhism and Hinduism. An inscription on Darius the Great's tombstone lists Kabul as one of the 29 countries of the Achaemenid Empire.

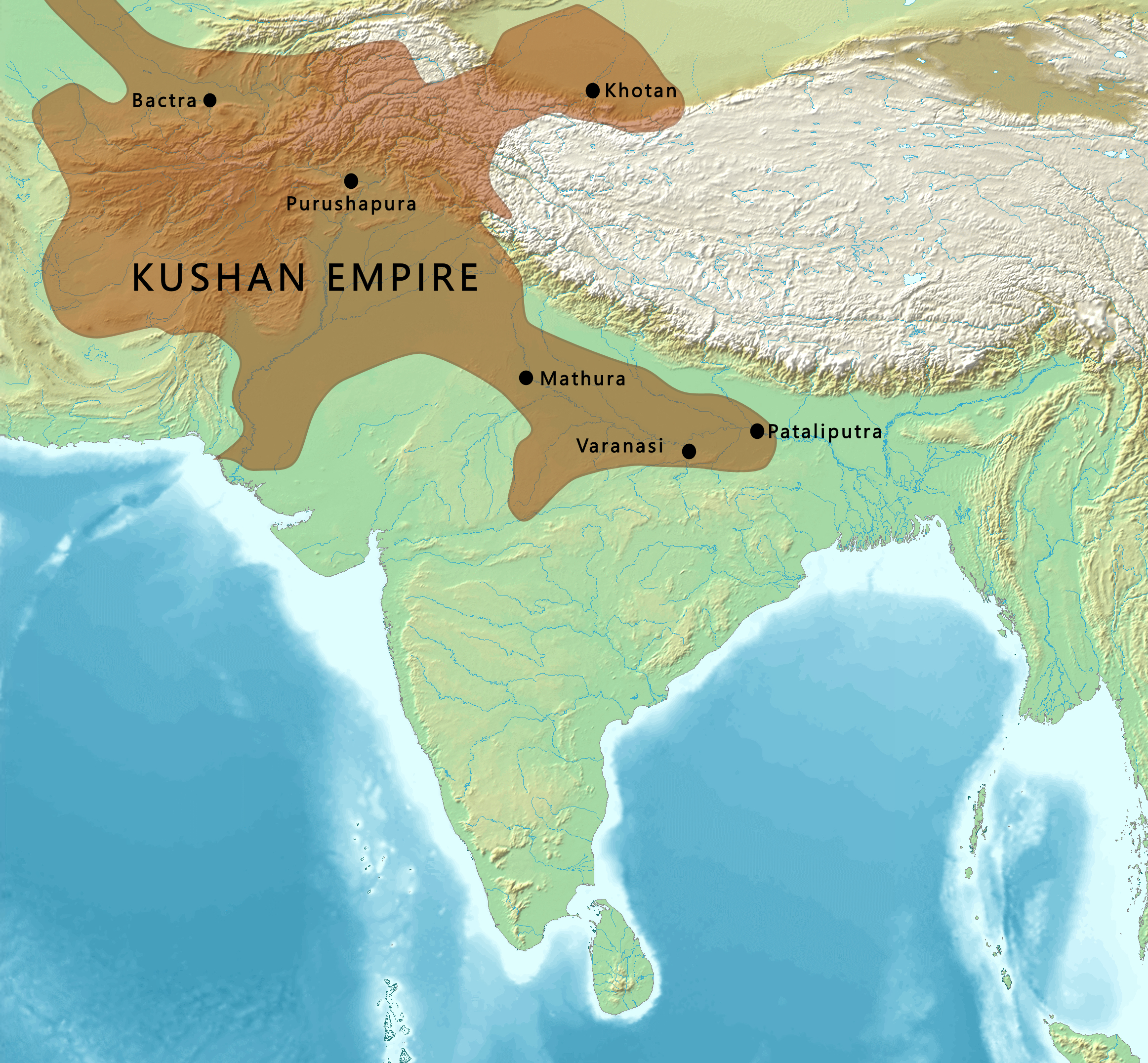
Kushan Empire

It is mentioned as Kophes or Kophene in some classical Greek writings. When Alexander the Great annexed the Achaemenid Empire, the Kabul Valley came under his control. After his death, his empire was seized by his general Seleucus, becoming part of the Seleucid Empire. In 305 BC, the Seleucid Empire ceded satrapies of Gandhara, including Kabul Valley, Arachosia and Gedrosia to the neighbouring Maurya Empire after a brief conflict.

During the Mauryan period, trade flourished due to the use of uniform weights and measures. Irrigation facilities for public use were developed, resulting in an increased crop harvest. People were also employed as artisans, jewelers, and carpenters.

The Greco-Bactrian Kingdom took control of Kabul from the Mauryans in the early 2nd century BC, then lost the city to their successors in the Indo-Greek Kingdom around the mid-2nd century BC. Buddhism was patronized by these rulers, and the majority of the region's population was adherent of the religion. Indo-Scythians expelled the Indo-Greeks by the mid 1st century BC, but lost the city to the Kushan Empire in the first century AD.

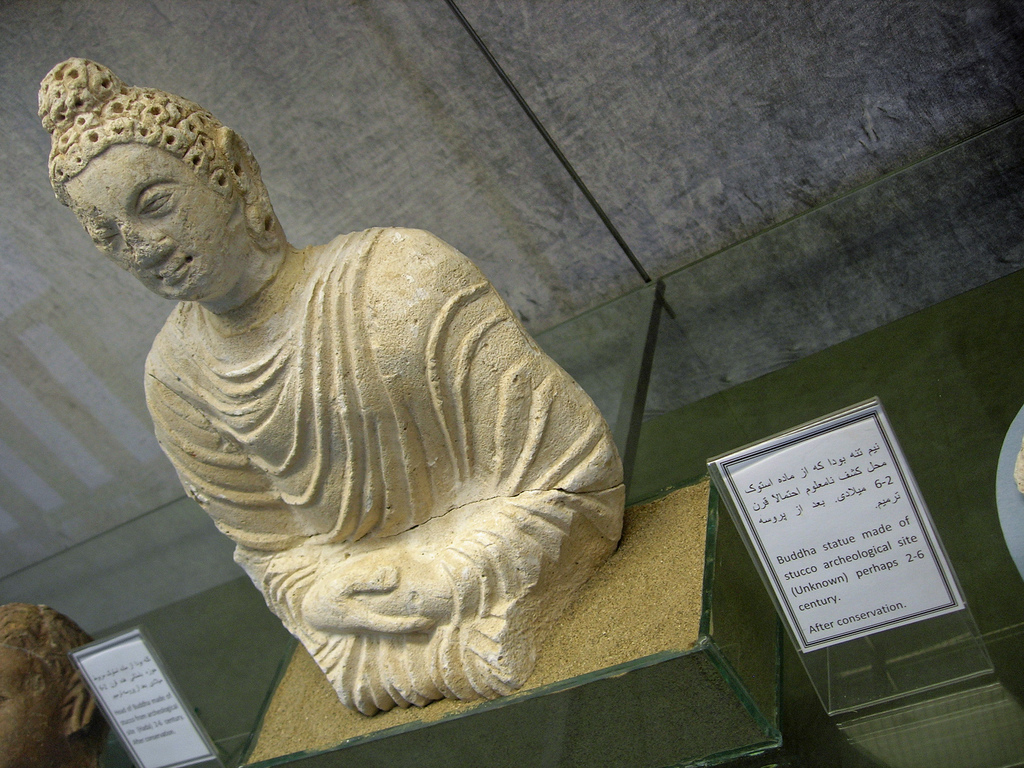
The Buddha, statue at the National Museum of Afghanistan, early 1st millennium

The Chinese Buddhist monk Hsuan Tsang refers to the city as Kaofu in the 7th century AD, which is the appellation of one of the five tribes of the Yuezhi who had migrated from across the Hindu Kush into the Kabul Valley around the beginning of the Common Era. It was conquered by Kushan Emperor Kujula Kadphises in about 45 AD, and remained Kushan territory until at least the 3rd century. The Kushans were Indo-European-speaking peoples related to the Yuezhi and based in Bactria.

Around 230, the Kushans were defeated by the Sasanian Empire and replaced by vassals known as the Kushano-Sasanian Kingdom. During this period, the city was referred to as "Kapul" in Pahlavi scripts.

Kapol in New Persian means "Royal Bridge", which is due to the main bridge on the Kabul that connected the east and west of the city. In 420, the Kushano-Sasanians were driven out of Kabul Valley by the Xionites known as the Kidarites, who were then replaced in the 460s by the Hephthalites. It became part of the surviving Kingdom of Kapisa, also known as Kabul-Shahan. According to Táríkhu-l Hind by al-Biruni, Kabul was governed by princes of Turkic lineage. It was briefly held by the Tibetan Empire between 801 and 815.

=== Islamisation and Mongol invasion ===
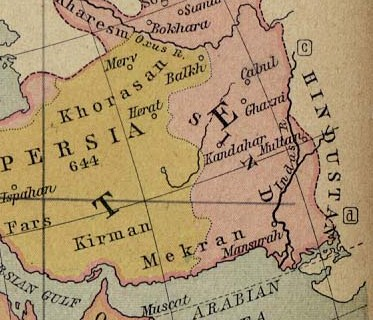
Map showing names of the regions during the 7th century.

The Islamic conquest reached modern-day Afghanistan in 642 AD, at a time when Kabul was independent. Until then, Kabul, ruled by Kabul Shahis, was considered politically and culturally part of the Indian world. A number of failed expeditions were made to Islamise the region. In one of them, Abdur Rahman bin Samara arrived in Kabul from Zaranj in the late 600s and converted 12,000 inhabitants to Islam before abandoning the city. Muslims were a minority until Ya'qub bin Laith as-Saffar of Zaranj conquered Kabul in 870 from the Hindu Shahis and established the first Islamic dynasty in the region, although the city reverted back to Shahi rule around 900. It was reported that the rulers of Kabul were Muslims with non-Muslims living close by. Iranian traveller and geographer Istakhri described it in 921:

Kábul has a castle celebrated for its strength, accessible only by one road. In it there are Musulmáns, and it has a town, in which are infidels from Hind.

Sabuktigin, the father of Mahmud of Ghazni, conquered Kabul permanently from the Shahi king Jayapaladeva around 977. Over the following centuries, the city was successively ruled by the Ghaznavids, Ghurids, Khwarazmshahs, and Qarlughids. In the 13th century, the invading Mongols caused major destruction in the region. Report of a massacre in the nearby Bamiyan is recorded around this period, where the entire population of the valley was annihilated by the Mongol troops as revenge for the death of Genghis Khan's grandson. As a result, many natives of Afghanistan fled south toward the Indian subcontinent, where some established dynasties in Delhi. The Chagatai Khanate and Kartids were vassals of the Ilkhanate until the dissolution of the latter in 1335.

In 1333, the Moroccan scholar Ibn Battuta visited Kabul and described the region as:

We travelled on to Kabul, formerly a vast town, the site of which is now occupied by a village inhabited by a tribe of Persians called Afghans. They hold mountains and defiles and possess considerable strength, and are mostly highwaymen. Their principal mountain is called Kuh Sulayman.

=== Timurid and Mughal era ===
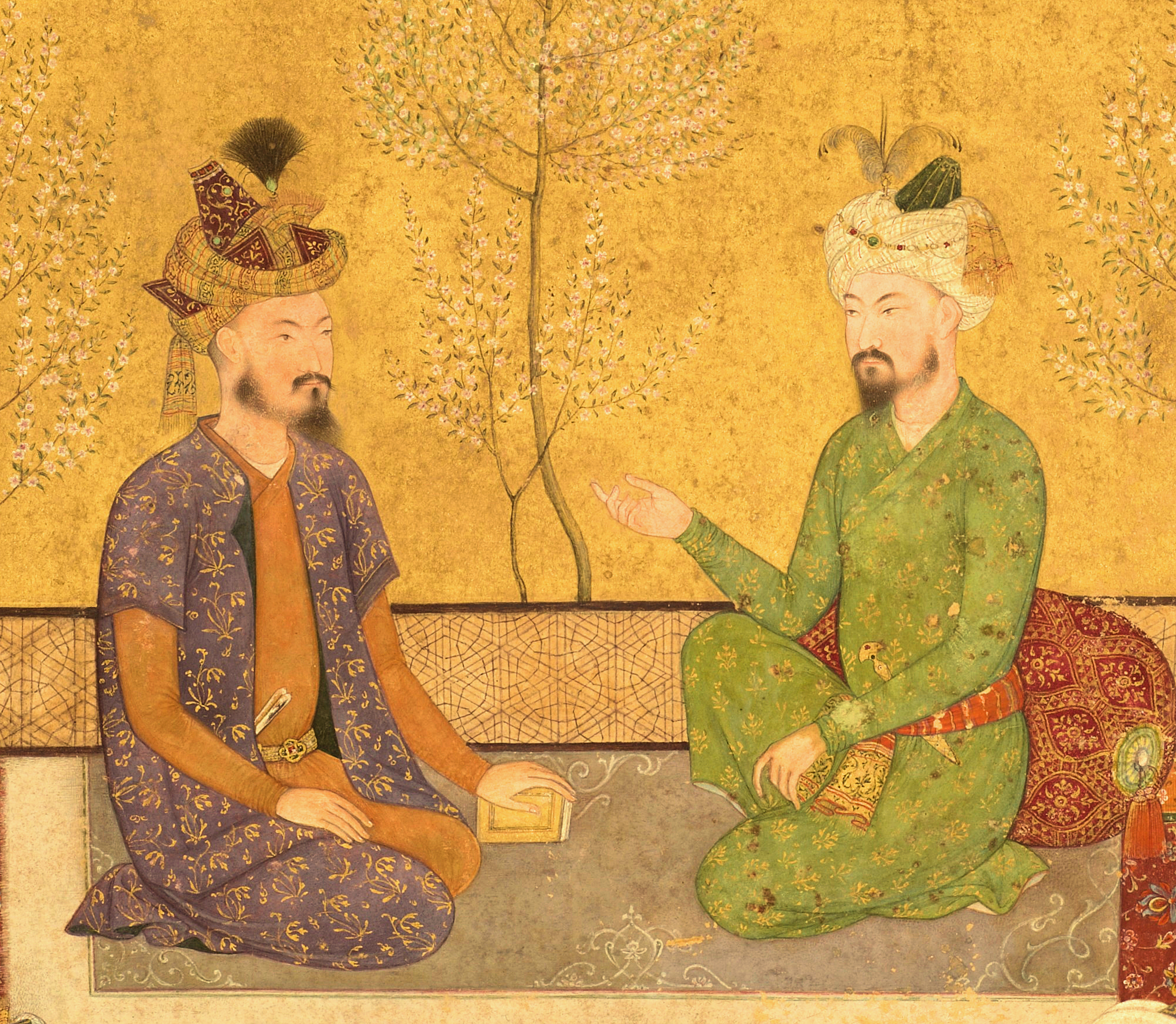
Humayun with his father Babur, emperors of the Mughal Empire

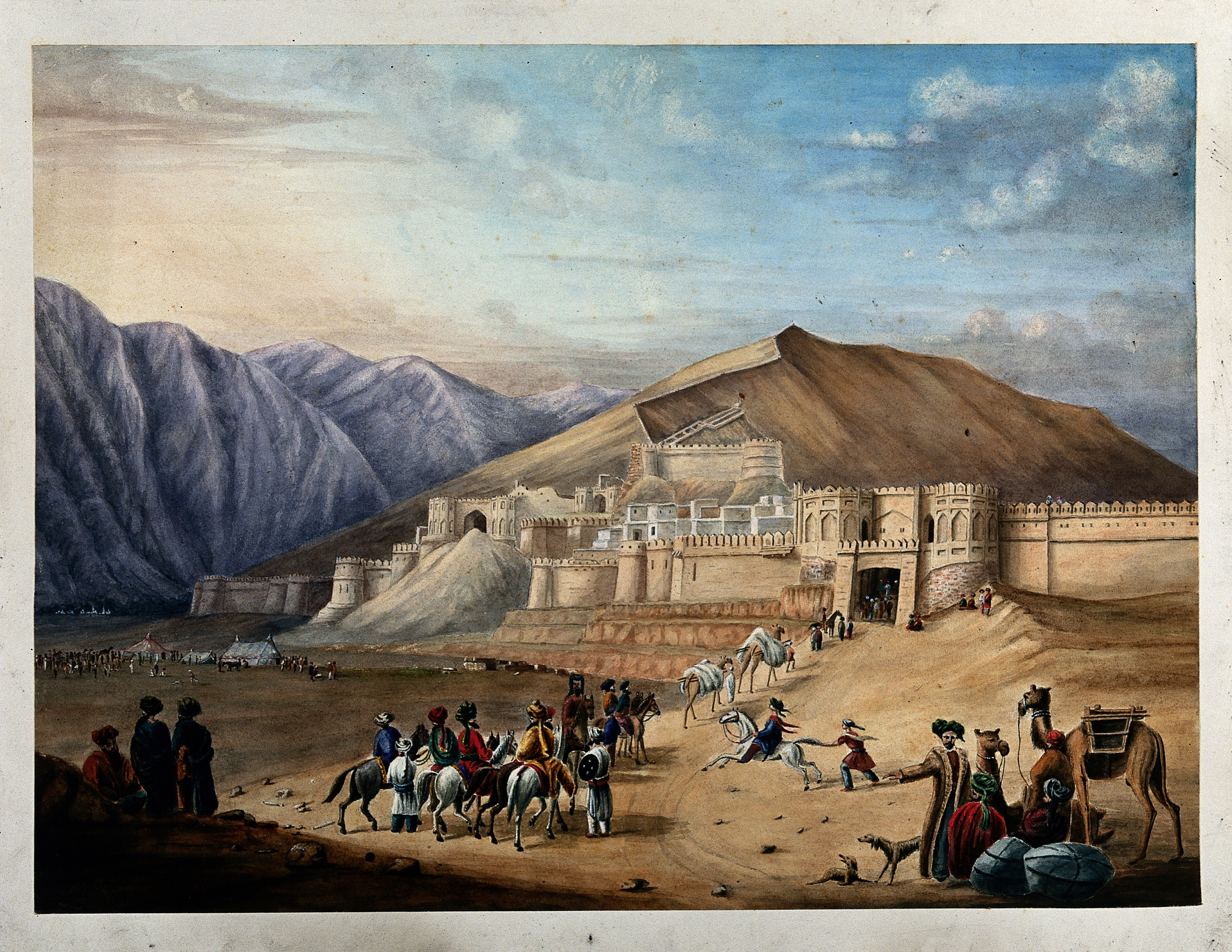
Old painting showing the Great Wall of Kabul

In the late 14th century, Kabul became a major trading centre in the kingdom of Timur (Tamerlane), and in following decades was ruled by branches of Timurid dynasty. In 1504, the city was captured by Babur from its Arghun usurper after his uncle Ulugh Beg II, who had previously ruled Kabul, died in 1501, and was made his headquarters, which later became one of the principal cities of the Mughal Empire. In the early 16th century, Babur described Kabulistan in his memoirs by stating the following:

There are many differing tribes in the Kābul country; in its dales and plains are Turks and clansmen and 'Arabs; and in its town and in many villages, Sārts; out in the districts and also in villages are the Pashāi, Parājī, Tājik, Bīrkī and Afghān tribes. In the western mountains are the Hazāra and Nikdīrī tribes, some of whom speak the Mughūlī tongue. In the north-eastern mountains are the places of the Kāfirs, such as Kitūr and Gibrik. To the south are the places of the Afghān tribes.

Mirza Muhammad Haidar Dughlat, an author and general from Moghulistan who visited at the time, wrote: "Dine and drink in Kabul: it is mountain, desert, city, river and all else." It was from here that Babur began his 1526 conquest of Hindustan, which was ruled by the Afghan Lodi dynasty by crossing the Indus River in present-day Pakistan. Babur loved Kabul and its weather that he was used to. He was initially buried in Agra but following his wish, he was later buried in Kabul. The inscription on his tomb contains the famous Persian couplet, which states:

اگرفردوس روی زمین است همین است و همین است و همین است

Transliteration:

Agar fardus rui zameen ast, hameen ast, o hameen ast, o hameen ast.

Translation:

If there is a paradise on earth, it is this, and it is this, and it is this!

Kabul remained in Mughal control for the next 200 years. Though Mughal power became centred within the Indian subcontinent, Kabul retained importance as a frontier city for the empire; Abul Fazl, Emperor Akbar's chronicler, described it as one of the two gates to Hindustan (the other being Kandahar). As part of administrative reforms under Akbar, the city was made capital of the eponymous Mughal province, Kabul Subah. Under Mughal governance, Kabul became a prosperous urban centre, endowed with bazaars such as the non-extant Char Chatta. Kabul served as a mint centre, producing gold and silver Mughal coins up to the reign of Alamgir II. It acted as a military base for Shah Jahan's central Asian campaigns in Balkh and Badakhshan. Kabul was also a recreational retreat for the Mughals, who hunted here and constructed several gardens. Most of the Mughals' architectural contributions to the city (such as gardens, fortifications, and mosques) have not survived. During this time, the population was about 60,000.

Under later Mughal Emperors, Kabul became neglected. The empire lost the city when it was captured in 1738 by Nader Shah, who was enroute to invade the Indian subcontinent.

=== Durrani and Barakzai dynasties ===
Shah Shuja Durrani, the last Durrani King, sitting at his court inside the Bala Hissar

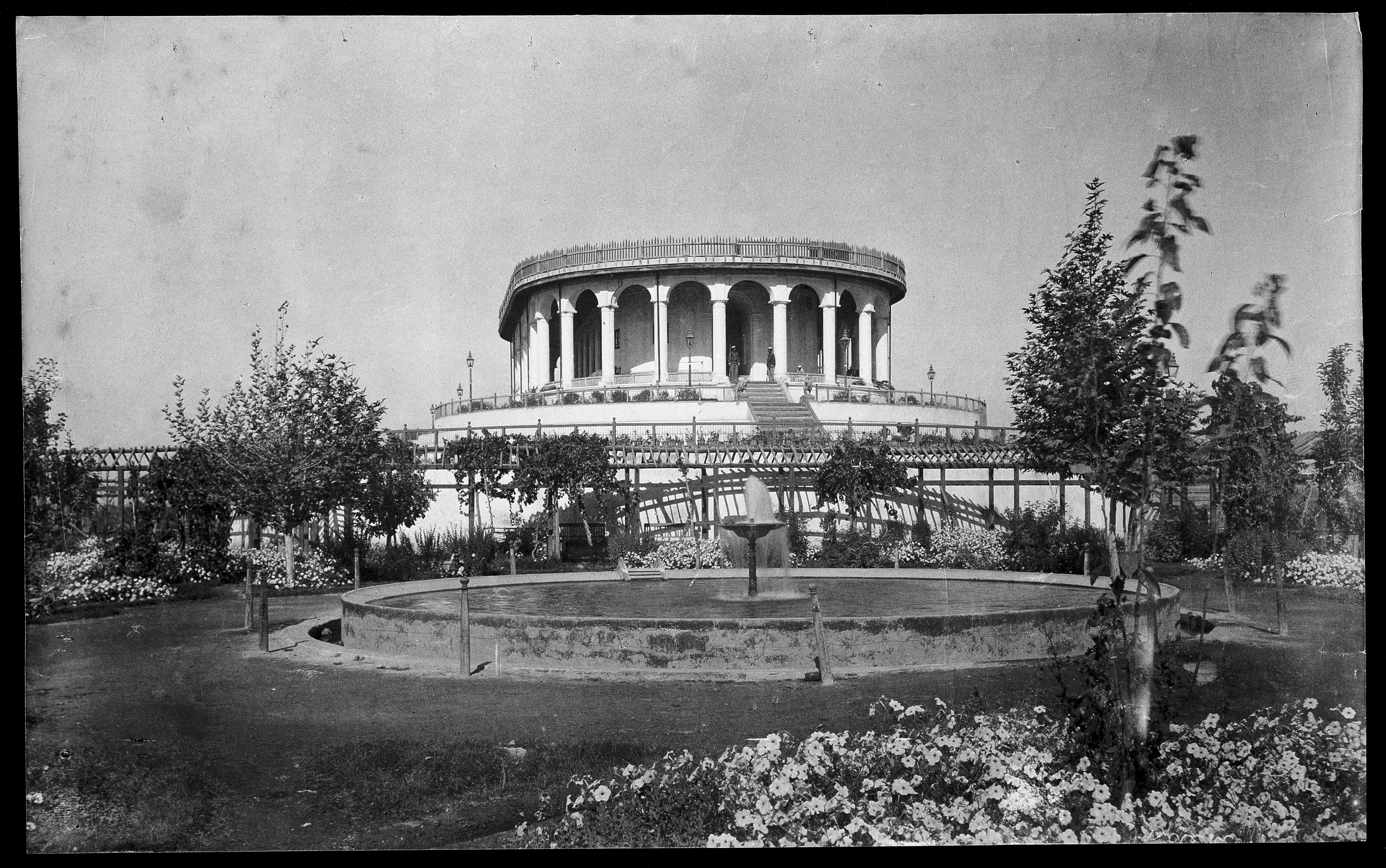
Chihil Sutun Palace (also known as "Hendaki"), one of numerous palaces built by the Emir in the 19th century

Nine years after Nader Shah and his forces invaded and occupied the city as part of the easternmost parts of his Empire, he was assassinated by his own officers, causing its rapid disintegration. Ahmad Shah Durrani, commander of 4,000 Abdali Afghans, asserted Pashtun rule in 1747 and further expanded his new Afghan Empire. His ascension to power marked the beginning of Afghanistan. By this time, Kabul had lost its status as a metropolitan city, and its population had decreased to 10,000. Interest in the city was renewed when Ahmad Shah's son Timur Shah Durrani, after inheriting power, transferred the capital of the Durrani Empire from Kandahar to Kabul in 1776. Kabul experienced considerable urban development during the reigns of Timur Shah and his successor Zaman Shah; several religious and public buildings were constructed, and diverse groups of Sufis, jurists, and literary families were encouraged to settle the city through land grants and stipends. Kabul's first visitor from Europe was Englishman George Forster, who described 18th-century Kabul as "the best and cleanest city in Asia".

In 1826, the kingdom was claimed by Dost Mohammad Khan, but in 1839 Shah Shuja Durrani was reinstalled with the help of the British Empire during the First Anglo-Afghan War. In 1841, a local uprising resulted in the killing of the British resident and the loss of the mission in Kabul and the 1842 retreat from Kabul to Jalalabad, in which 4,500 regular British troops and 14,000 civilians were killed by Afghan tribesmen. In 1842, the British returned to Kabul, demolishing the city's main bazaar in revenge during the Kabul Expedition (1842) before returning to British India (now Pakistan). Akbar Khan took to the throne from 1842 to 1845 and was followed by Dost Mohammad Khan.

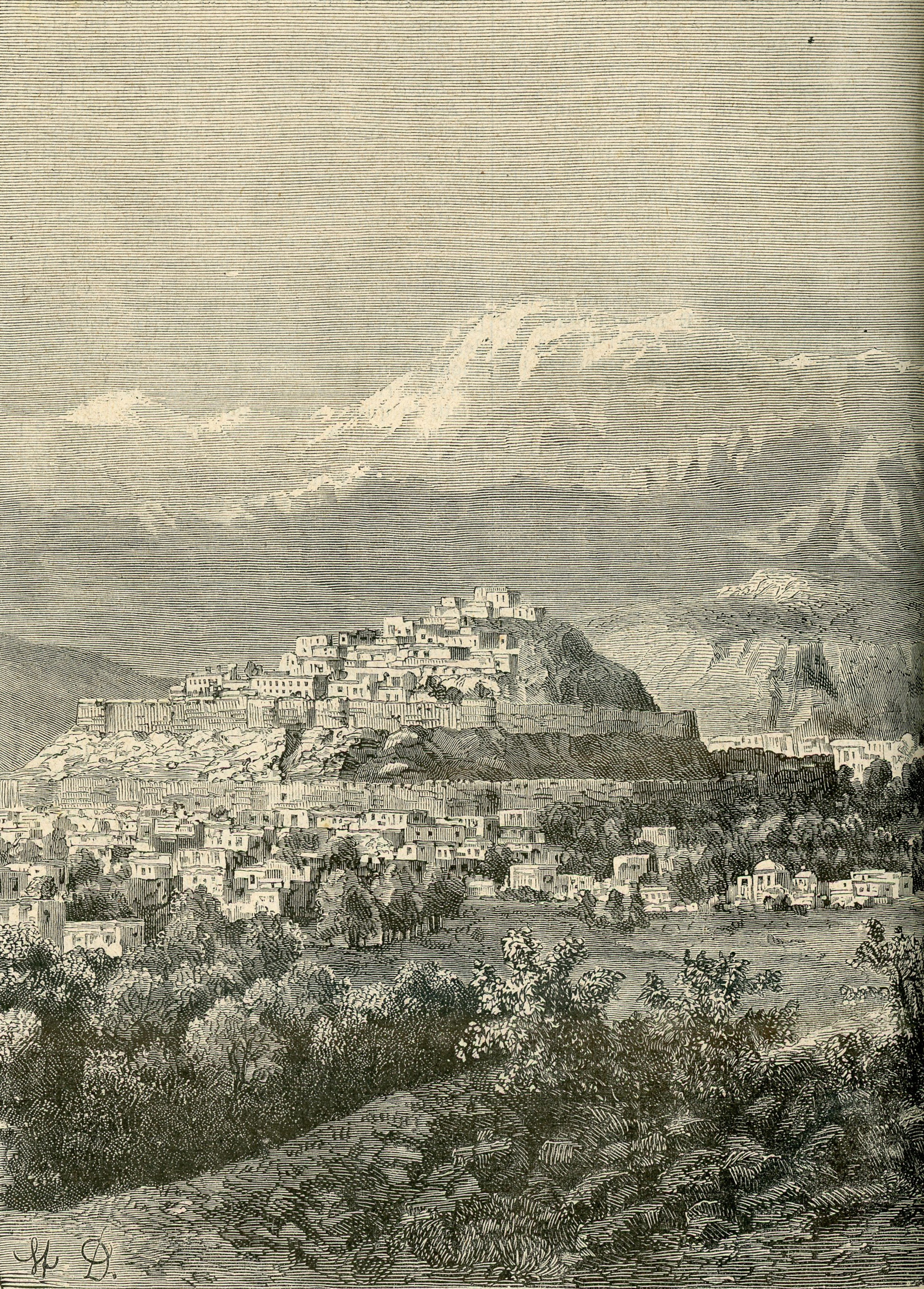
Etching of Kabul by an Italian artist, 1885

The Second Anglo-Afghan War broke out in 1879 when Kabul was under Sher Ali Khan's rule, as the Afghan king initially refused to accept British diplomatic missions, and later, the British residents were again massacred. During the war, Bala Hissar was partially destroyed by a fire and an explosion.

=== 20th century ===
In Kabul, an established bazaar city, leather and textile industries developed by 1916. The majority of the population was concentrated on the south side of the river.

The city was modernised throughout the regime of King Habibullah Khan, with the introduction of electricity, telephone, and a postal service. The first modern high school, Habibia, was established in 1903. In 1919, after the Third Anglo-Afghan War, King Amanullah Khan announced Afghanistan's independence in foreign affairs at Eidgah Mosque in Kabul. Amanullah was reform-minded, and he had a plan to build a new capital city on land 6 km from Kabul. This area, named Darulaman, consisted of the famous Darul Aman Palace, where he later resided. Many educational institutions were founded in Kabul during the 1920s. In 1929, King Amanullah left Kabul after a local uprising orchestrated by Habibullah Kalakani, but he was imprisoned and executed after nine months in power by King Nader Khan. Three years later, in 1933, the new king was assassinated during an award ceremony in a school in Kabul. The throne was left to his 19-year-old son, Zahir Shah, who became the last King of Afghanistan. Unlike Amanullah Khan, Nader Khan and Zahir Shah had no plans to create a new capital city, and thus Kabul remained the country's seat of government.

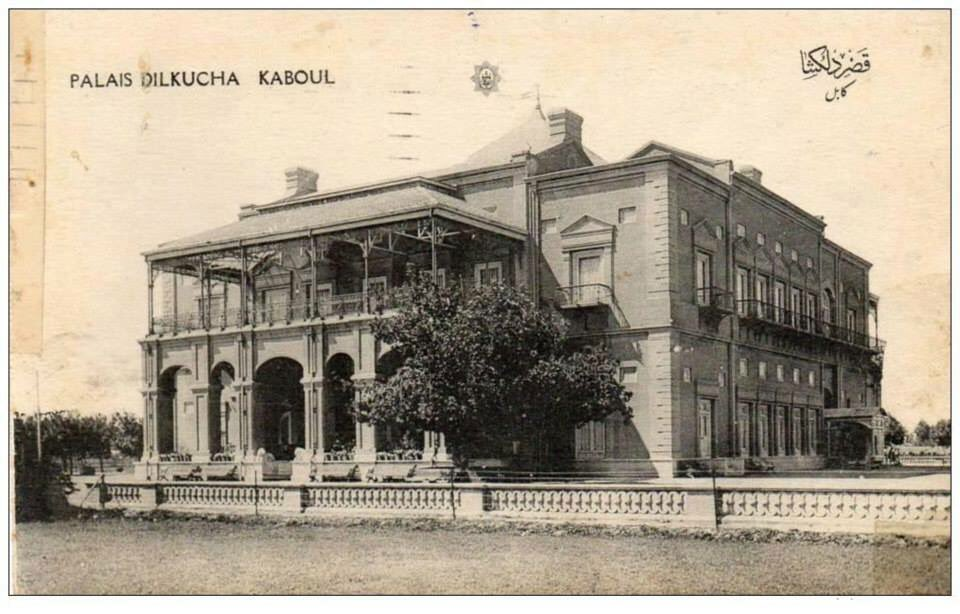
Dilkusha Palace, built in European style in the 1900s

During the inter-war period, France and Germany helped to develop the country and maintained high schools and lycées in the capital, providing education for the children of the city's elite families. Kabul University opened in 1932, and by the 1960s, the majority of teachers were Western-educated Afghans and the majority of instructors at the university had degrees from Western universities.

Kabul's only railway service, the Kabul–Darulaman Tramway, operated for six years from 1923 to 1929. When Zahir Shah took power in 1933, Kabul had the only 10 km (6 mi) of rail and the country had few internal telegraphs, phone lines or roads. Zahir turned to the Japanese, Germans, and Italians for help in developing a modern transportation and communications network. A radio tower built in Kabul by the Germans in 1937 provided communication with outlying villages. A national bank and state cartels were organised to allow for economic modernisation. Textile mills, power plants, carpet and furniture factories were built in Kabul, providing much-needed manufacturing and infrastructure.

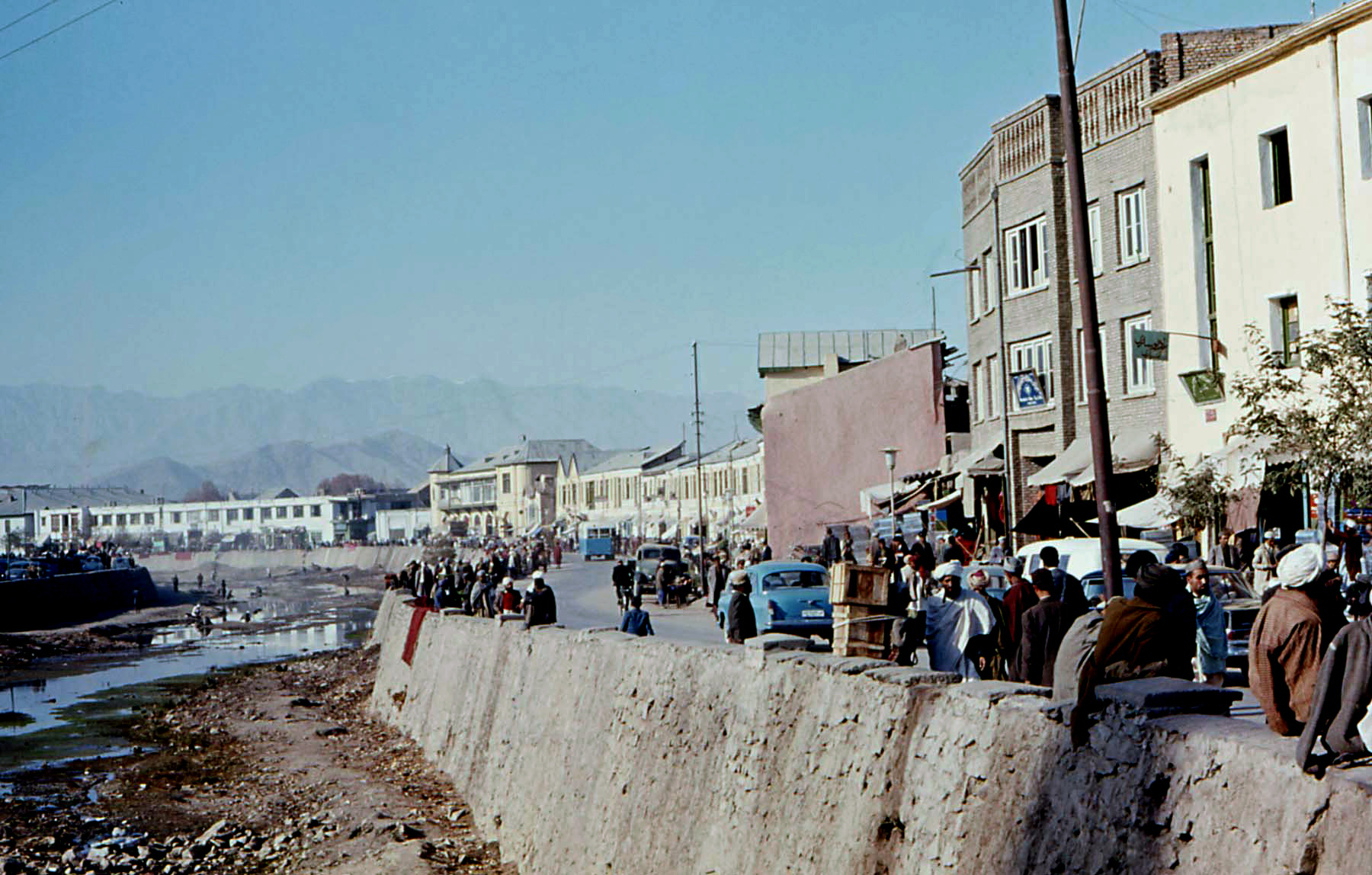
The river bank in the centre of Kabul in the 1960s

During the 1940s and 1950s, urbanisation accelerated and the built-up area was increased in size to 68 km^{2} by 1962;, an almost fourteen-fold increase since 1925. The Serena Hotel opened in 1945 as the first Western-style luxury hotel. In the 1950s, under the premiership of Mohammad Daoud Khan, foreign investment and development increased. In 1955, the Soviet Union forwarded $100 million in credit to Afghanistan, which financed public transportation, airports, a cement factory, a mechanised bakery, a five-lane highway from Kabul to the Soviet border, and dams, including the Salang Pass to the north of Kabul. During the 1960s, Soviet-style microrayon housing estates were built, containing sixty blocks. The government also built many ministry buildings in the brutalist architecture style. In the 1960s the first Marks & Spencer store in Central Asia was built in the city. Kabul Zoo was inaugurated in 1967 which was maintained with the help of visiting German zoologists. During this time, Kabul experimented with liberalisation, notably the loosening of restrictions on speech and assembly, which led to student politics in the capital and demonstrations by Socialist, Maoist, liberal, or Islamist factions.

Foreigners flocked to Kabul as the nation's tourism industry expanded. To accompany the city's newfound tourism, western-style accommodations were opened in the 1960s, notably the Spinzar Hotel. Western, American and Japanese tourists visited the city's attractions including Chicken Street and the National Museum that contained some of Asia's finest cultural artefacts. Lonely Planet called it an upcoming "tourist trap" in 1973. Pakistanis visited to watch Indian films that were banned in their own country. Kabul was nicknamed the Paris of Central Asia. According to J. Bruce Amstutz, an American diplomat in Kabul:

[Before the 1978 Marxist coup d'etat] Kabul was a pleasant city [..] Though poor economically, it was spared the eyesore slums so visible in other Asian cities. The Afghans themselves were an imposing people, the men tall and self-assured, and the women attractive.

Until the late 1970s, Kabul was a stop on the Hippie trail from Kandahar to the southwest towards Peshawar. The city was known for its street sales of hashish and became a major attraction for western hippies.

==== Occupations, wars and Taliban rule (1996–2001) ====
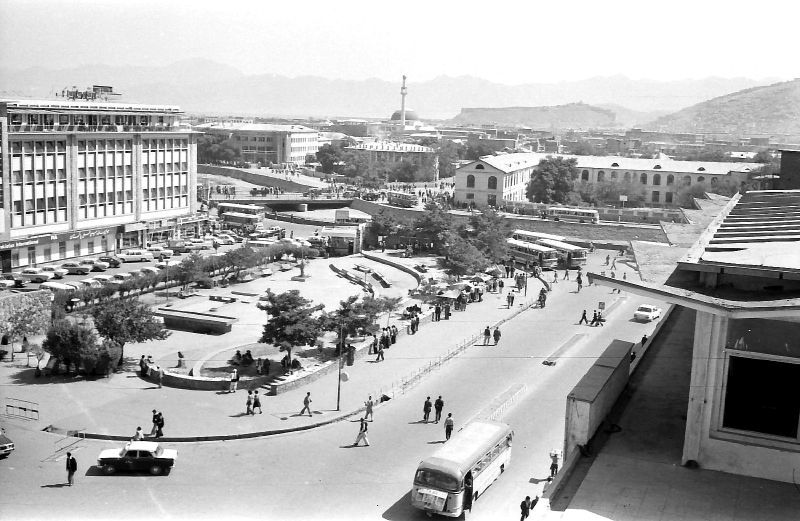
Centre of Kabul in 1979; the Pul-e Khishti bridge crosses the Kabul River to the old city on the south bank

On 28 April 1978, President Daoud and most of his family were assassinated in Kabul's Presidential Palace in what is called the Saur Revolution. Pro-Soviet PDPA under Nur Muhammad Taraki seized power and slowly began to institute reforms. Private businesses were nationalised in the Soviet manner. Education was modified into the Soviet model, with lessons focusing on teaching Russian, Marxism–Leninism and the learning of other countries belonging to the Soviet bloc.

Amid growing internal chaos and heightened Cold War tensions, the U.S. Ambassador to Afghanistan, Adolph Dubs, was kidnapped on his way to work at the U.S. Embassy in Kabul on 14 February 1979 and killed during a rescue attempt at the Serena Hotel. There were conflicting reports of who abducted Dubs and what demands were made for his release. Several senior Soviet officials were in the lobby of the hotel during a standoff with the kidnappers, who were holding Dubs in room 117. Afghan police, acting on the advice of Soviet advisors and over the objections of U.S. officials, launched a rescue attempt, during which Dubs was shot in the head from a distance of six inches and killed. Many questions about the killing remain unanswered.

On 24 December 1979, the Soviet Union invaded Afghanistan, and Kabul was heavily occupied by the Soviet Armed Forces. In Pakistan, Director-General of the ISI Akhtar Abdur Rahman advocated for the idea of a covert operation in Afghanistan by arming Islamic extremists who formed the mujahideen. General Rahman was heard loudly saying: "Kabul must burn! Kabul must burn!", and mastered the idea of proxy war in Afghanistan. Pakistani President Zia-ul-Haq authorised this operation under General Rahman, which was later merged with Operation Cyclone, a programme funded by the United States and carried out by the Central Intelligence Agency.

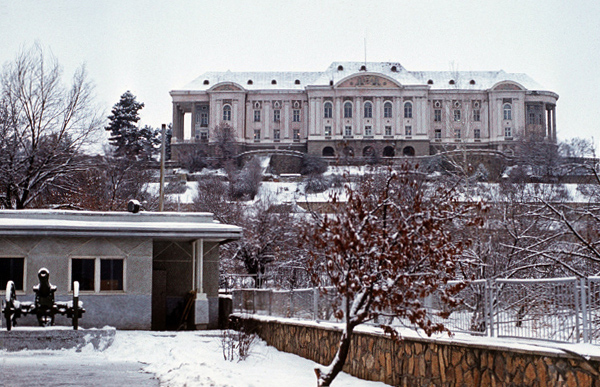
Taj Beg Palace in 1987, the Soviet Army headquarters during the Soviet–Afghan War

The Soviets turned the city of Kabul into their command centre during the Soviet–Afghan War, and while fighting was mostly taking place in the countryside, Kabul was widely disturbed. Political crime and guerrilla attacks on military and government targets were common, and the sound of gunfire became commonplace at night on the outskirts. Large numbers of PDPA party members and Soviet troops were kidnapped or assassinated, sometimes in broad daylight, with acts of terrorism committed by civilians, anti-regime militias, and also Khalqists. By July 1980, as many as twelve party members were being assassinated on a daily basis, and the Soviet Army stopped patrolling the city in January 1981. A major uprising against the Soviet presence broke out in Kabul in February 1980 in what is called the 3 Hut uprising. It led to a night curfew in the city that would remain in place for seven years. The Soviet Embassy also, was attacked four times with arms fire in the first five years of the war. A Western correspondent revisiting Kabul in December 1983 after a year, said that the city was "converted into a fortress bristling with weapons". Contrastingly, that same year American diplomat Charles Dunbar commented that the Soviet troops' presence was "surprisingly modest", and an author in a 1983 Bulletin of the Atomic Scientists article thought that the Soviet soldiers had a "friendly" atmosphere.

The city's population increased from around 500,000 in 1978 to 1.5 million in 1988. The large influx were mostly internal refugees who fled other parts of the country for safety in Kabul in camps such as Charahi Qambar. During this time, women made up 40% of the workforce. Soviet men and women were very common in the city's shopping roads, with the large availability of Western products. Most Soviet civilians (numbering between 8,000 and 10,000) lived in the northeastern Soviet-style Mikrorayon (microraion) housing complex that was surrounded by barbed-wire and armed tanks. They sometimes received abuse from anti-Soviet civilians on the streets. The mujahideen rebels managed to strike at the city a few times—on 9 October 1987, a car bomb planted by a mujahideen group killed 27 people, and on 27 April 1988, in celebrations of the 10th anniversary of the Saur Revolution, a truck bomb killed six people.

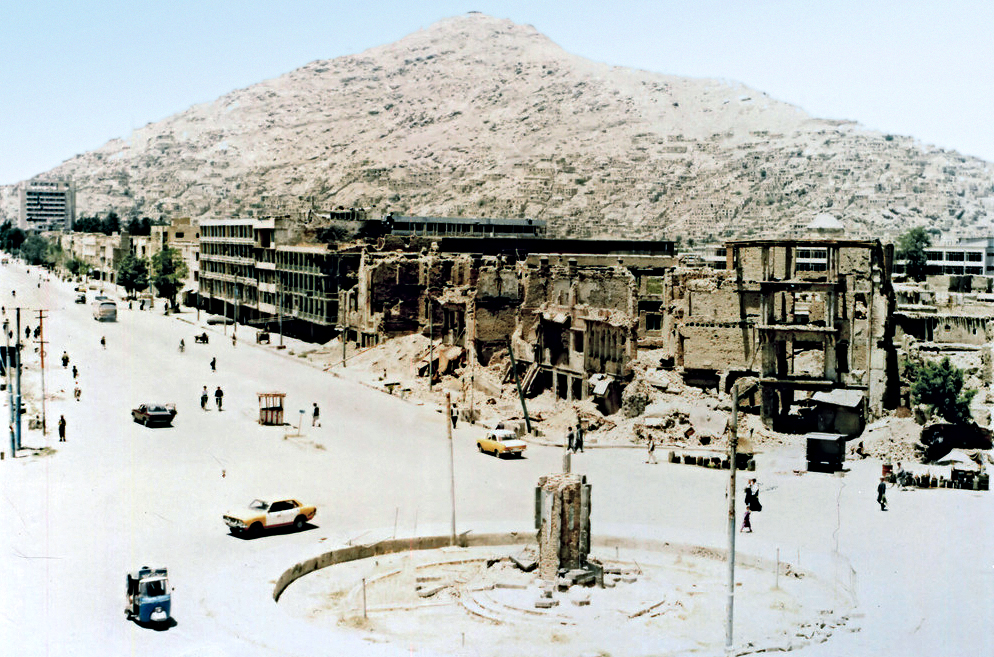
Kabul's Jada-e Maiwand in 1993, showing the destruction caused by the civil war.

After the fall of Mohammad Najibullah's government in April 1992, different mujahideen factions entered the city and formed a government under the Peshawar Accords, but Gulbuddin Hekmatyar's party refused to sign the accords and started shelling the city for power, which soon escalated into a full-scale conflict. This marked the start of a dark period of the city: at least 30,000 civilians were killed in a period known locally as the "Kabul Wars." About 80 percent of the city was devastated and destroyed by 1996. The old city and western areas were among the worst-hit. A New York Times analyst said in 1996 that the city was more devastated than Sarajevo, which was similarly damaged during the Bosnian War at the time.

The city suffered heavily under a bombardment campaign between rival militias, which intensified during the summer of 1992. Its geographic location in a narrow valley made it an easy target from rockets fired by militias who based themselves in the surrounding mountains. Within two years' time, the majority of infrastructure was destroyed, a massive exodus of the population left to the countryside or abroad, and electricity and water was completely out. In late 1994, bombardment of the capital came to a temporary halt. These forces took steps to restore law and order. Courts started to work again, convicting individuals inside government troops who had committed crimes. On 27 September 1996, the hardline Taliban militia seized Kabul and established the Islamic Emirate of Afghanistan. They imposed a strict form of Sharia (Islamic law), restricting women from work and education, conducting amputations against common thieves, and hit-squads from the infamous "Ministry for Promotion of Virtue and Prevention of Vice" watching public beatings of people.

=== 21st century ===
In November 2001, the Northern Alliance captured Kabul after the Taliban had abandoned the city following an American invasion. A month later, a new government began to assemble under President Hamid Karzai. A NATO-led International Security Assistance Force (ISAF) was deployed in Afghanistan, and many expatriate Afghans returned to the country. Kabul's population grew from about 500,000 in 2001 to over 3 million. Foreign embassies re-opened. In 2008, responsibility for security began to shift from NATO to Afghan forces. In 2001 rebuilding began and many of the city's damaged landmarks were rebuilt or restored, including the Gardens of Babur in 2005, the arch of Paghman, the Mahmoud Khan Bridge clock tower in 2013 and the Taj Beg Palace in 2021. Local community efforts repaired homes and dwellings.

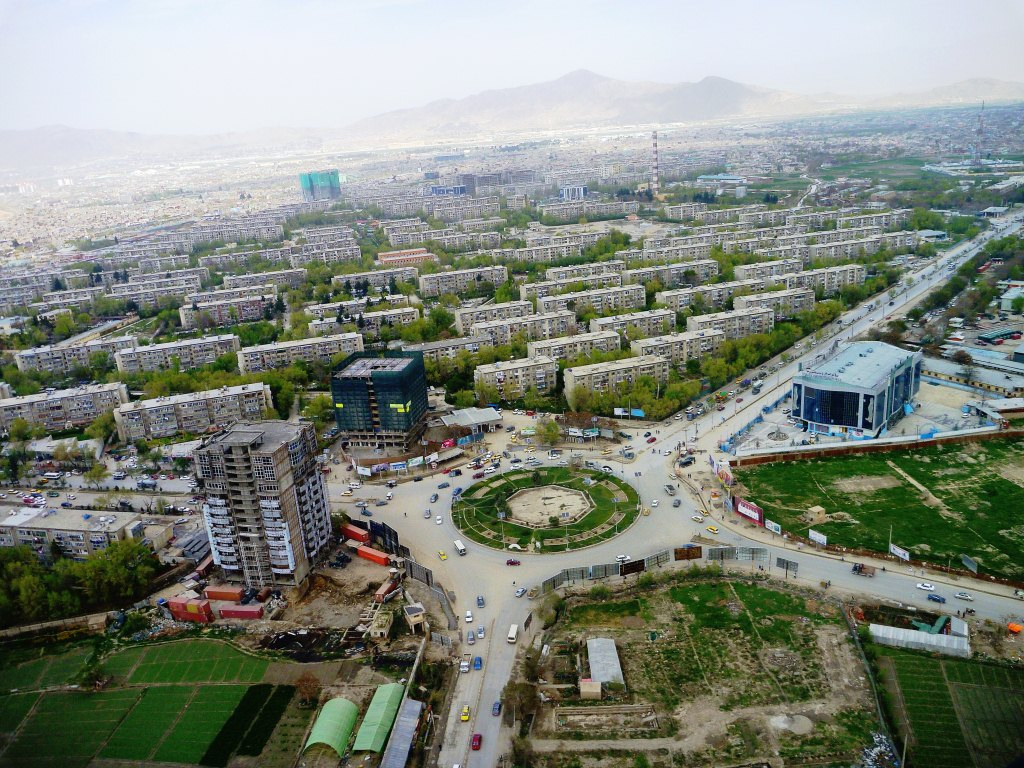
The Mikrorayon neighborhood in 2013

With an increasing population the city experienced rapid urbanisation, and many informal settlements were built. Numerous modern housing complexes were built after the late 2000s, many of them gated and secured, to serve a growing Afghan middle class. These included the Aria City (in District 10) and Golden City (District 8). Complexes were built out of town, such as the Omid-e-Sabz township (District 13), Qasaba/Khwaja Rawash township (District 15), and Sayed Jamaludin township (District 12).

A high-security "Green Zone" was formed in the centre of the city. In 2010, a series of guarded checkpoints called the Ring of Steel was put into operation. Concrete blast walls appeared throughout Kabul in the 2000s.

The city continued to develop despite frequent terrorist attacks, mainly by Taliban insurgents, and Kabul was the fifth fastest-growing city in the world in 2012. Until August 2021, the Afghan National Security Forces (ANSF) were in charge of security in and around the city. Kabul was periodically the scene of deadly bombings, carried out mostly by the Taliban and its wing the Haqqani network. Government employees, soldiers and ordinary civilians were targets of attacks. The Afghan government called the actions of the terrorists war crimes. The deadliest attack was a truck bombing in May 2017. The 2021 Kabul school bombing targeted a girls' school in Dashte Barchi.

The city was seized during the 2021 Taliban offensive on 15 August 2021. Under Taliban rule the city and the country experienced relative calm, although terrorist attacks continued to be committed by the regional ISIL branch. On 9 October 2025 a drone strike occurred in the Taimani area of Kabul which killed and wounded a number of civilians. This ignited the 2025 Afghanistan–Pakistan conflict.

== Geography ==
Maranjan Hill, to the left

Kabul is situated at an altitude of 1,791 m (5,876 ft) above sea level in a narrow valley in the eastern part of Afghanistan, wedged between the Hindu Kush mountains along the Kabul River. Immediately to the south of the old part of the city are the ancient city walls and the Sher Darwaza mountain, with the Shuhadayi Salihin cemetery behind it. A bit further east is the ancient Bala Hissar fortress with the Hashmat Khan Lake behind it.

Some of Kabul's mountains (which are called koh in Dari and ghar in Pashto) include: Khair Khana-e Shamali, Khwaja Rawash, Shakhi Baran Tey, Chihil Sutun, Qurugh, Khwaja Razaq and Sher Darwaza. There are also two mountains in between urban areas to the west: Koh-e Asamai (locally known as the Television Hill) and Ali Abad. Hills within the city (which are called tapa in Dari and ghondai in Pashto) include Bagh-e Bala, Bibi Mahro, Maranjan, Zazai, and many more.

The Logar River flows into Kabul from the south, joining the Kabul River not far from the city centre.

The city covers an area size of 1,049 km^{2} (405 sq mi), making it by far the largest in the country. The closest foreign capital cities as the crow flies are Islamabad, Dushanbe, Tashkent, New Delhi and Bishkek. Kabul is roughly equidistant between Istanbul (western Asia) and Hanoi (eastern Asia).

=== Climate ===
Kabul has a continental, cold semi-arid climate (BSk), with precipitation concentrated in the winter (almost exclusively falling as snow) and spring months. Summers have very low humidity, providing some relief from the heat. Autumns feature warm afternoons and sharply cooler evenings. Winters are very cold by South Asian standards, with a subzero January daily average temperature of −2.3 °C (27.9 °F), mainly due to the high elevation of the city. Spring is the wettest time of the year. Sunny conditions dominate year-round, and the annual mean temperature is only 12.1 °C (53.8 °F), much lower than that of Afghanistan's other large cities.

Climate data for Kabul (1991-2020)
Month	Jan	Feb	Mar	Apr	May	Jun	Jul	Aug	Sep	Oct	Nov	Dec	Year
Record high °C (°F)	18.8 (65.8)	22.0 (71.6)	26.7 (80.1)	30.0 (86.0)	34.4 (93.9)	37.7 (99.9)	40.5 (104.9)	41.0 (105.8)	35.1 (95.2)	31.6 (88.9)	24.4 (75.9)	20.4 (68.7)	41.0 (105.8)
Mean daily maximum °C (°F)	4.5 (40.1)	6.4 (43.5)	13.0 (55.4)	19.3 (66.7)	24.8 (76.6)	30.6 (87.1)	32.1 (89.8)	31.8 (89.2)	28.1 (82.6)	21.6 (70.9)	14.4 (57.9)	8.1 (46.6)	19.6 (67.3)
Daily mean °C (°F)	−0.5 (31.1)	1.6 (34.9)	7.3 (45.1)	13.0 (55.4)	17.7 (63.9)	22.8 (73.0)	24.9 (76.8)	24.4 (75.9)	19.9 (67.8)	13.4 (56.1)	7.1 (44.8)	2.4 (36.3)	12.8 (55.0)
Mean daily minimum °C (°F)	−5.5 (22.1)	−3.2 (26.2)	1.6 (34.9)	6.7 (44.1)	10.6 (51.1)	15.0 (59.0)	17.7 (63.9)	17.0 (62.6)	11.7 (53.1)	5.2 (41.4)	−0.2 (31.6)	−3.3 (26.1)	6.1 (43.0)
Record low °C (°F)	−25.5 (−13.9)	−24.8 (−12.6)	−12.6 (9.3)	−2.1 (28.2)	0.4 (32.7)	3.1 (37.6)	7.5 (45.5)	6.0 (42.8)	1.0 (33.8)	−3.2 (26.2)	−14.8 (5.4)	−23.0 (−9.4)	−25.5 (−13.9)
Average precipitation mm (inches)	42 (1.7)	64 (2.5)	79 (3.1)	68 (2.7)	28 (1.1)	1 (0.0)	6 (0.2)	3 (0.1)	2 (0.1)	6 (0.2)	18 (0.7)	29 (1.1)	346 (13.6)
Average rainy days	4	6	10	9	5	1	2	1	0	2	3	4	47
Average snowy days	5.0	4.4	1.6	0.1	0	0	0	0	0	0	0.3	2.6	14
Average relative humidity (%)	69	68	62	57	48	36	37	38	39	46	53	64	51.4
Mean monthly sunshine hours	177	179	205	222	313	357	363	357	327	298	228	164	3,190
Source: NOAA

=== Architecture ===
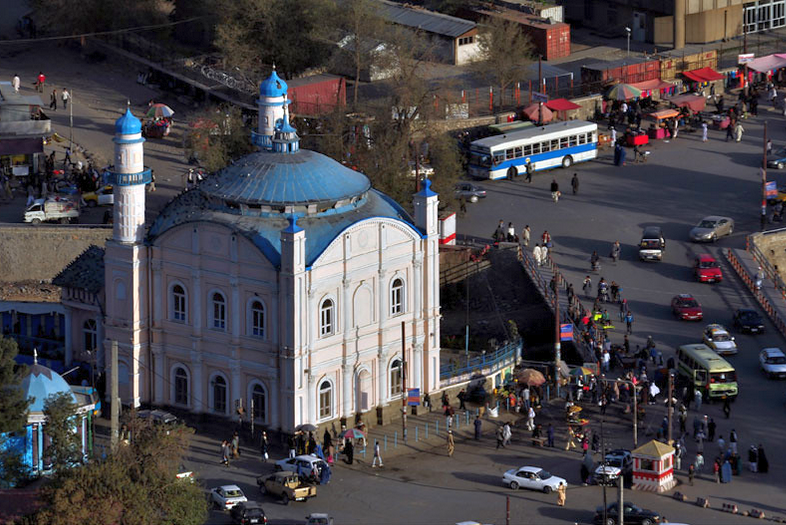
Italian baroque style of Shah Do Shamshira

Kabul's various architectural designs reflect the various links it has with empires and civilisations, particularly being on the ancient trade route connecting India and China with Persia and the West.

The Buddhist Chakari minaret was likely built in the Kushan era and has traces of Greco-Bactrian and Gandhara Art. It has Buddhist swastika and both Mahayana and Theravada qualities. Following the Islamic conquest, a new age of architectural realms appeared in the Kabul region. The Gardens of Babur is perhaps the best preserved example of Islamic and Mughal architecture. Emperor Babur has also built seven other big gardens in Kabul at the time. The present Gardens of Babur also reflect Afghanistan's traditional architecture by the wooden carving, pressed stucco, decorative stone masonry and other features. Another fine example of the Babur era is the Eidgah Mosque, using stones from Punjab and Sindh and designs by Persians.

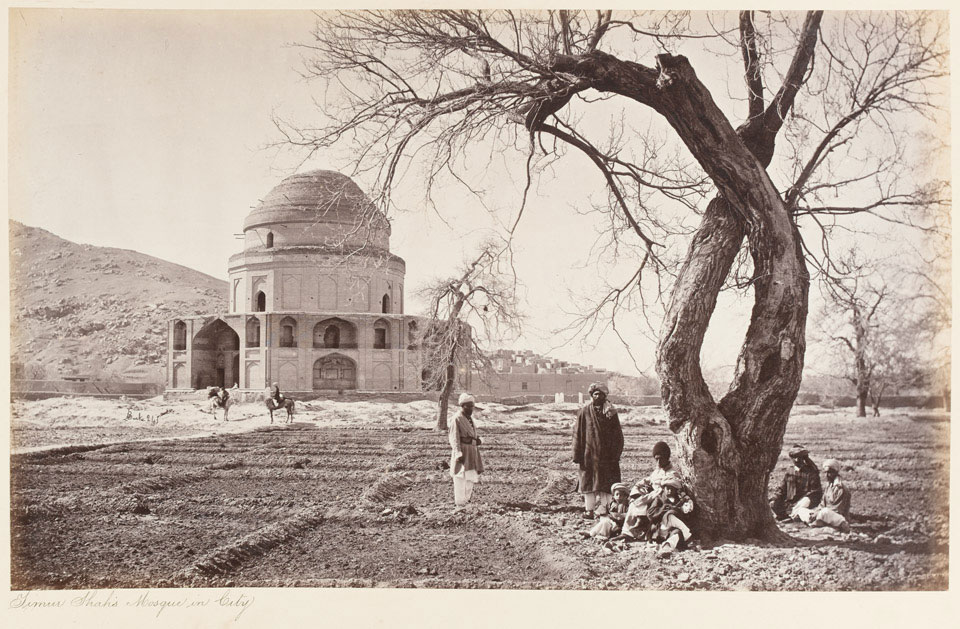
Mausoleum of Timur Shah Durrani (early 19th century rebuilt)

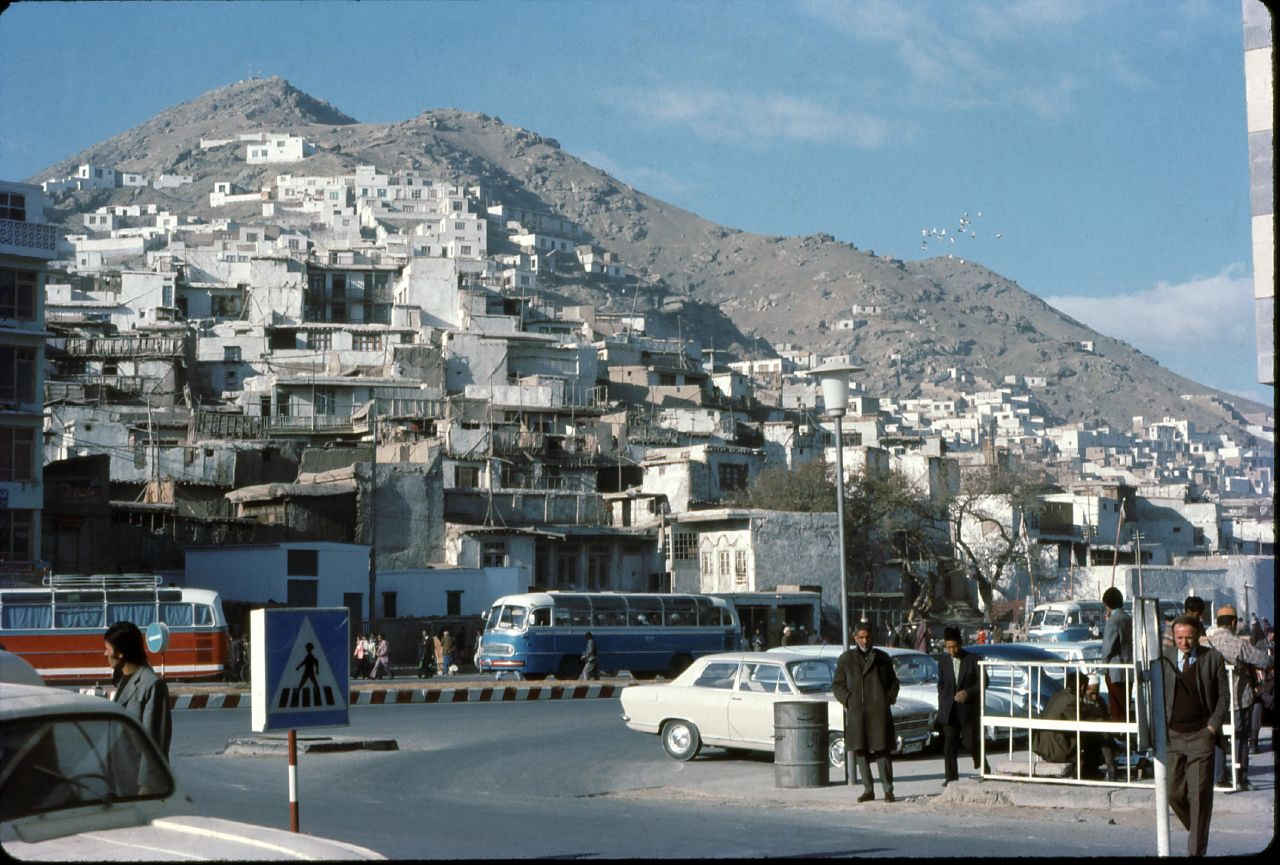
Traditional hill dwellings in the Koh-e Asamai area (1974)

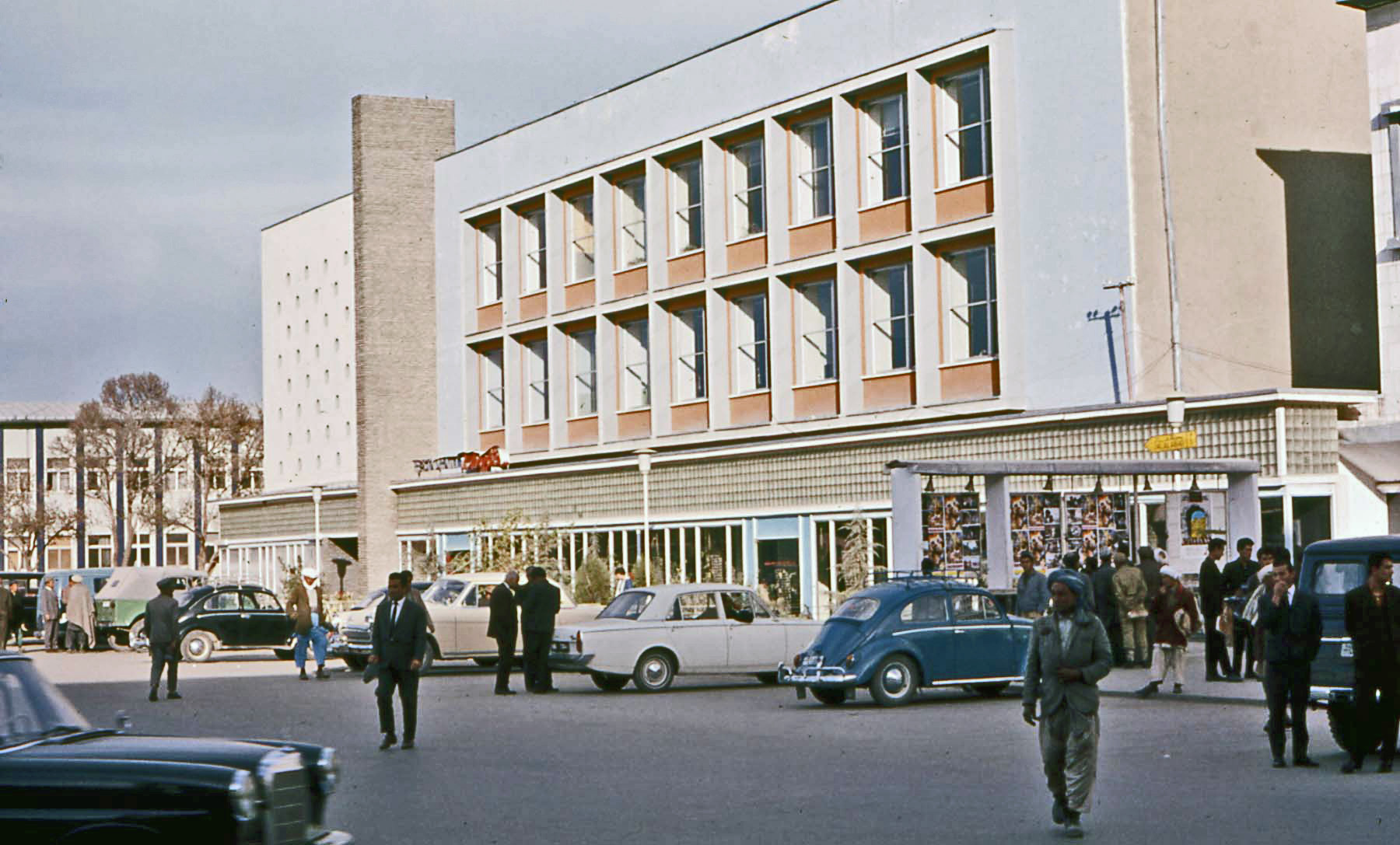
Ministry of Finance, next to Ariana Cinema near Pashtunistan Square (1966)

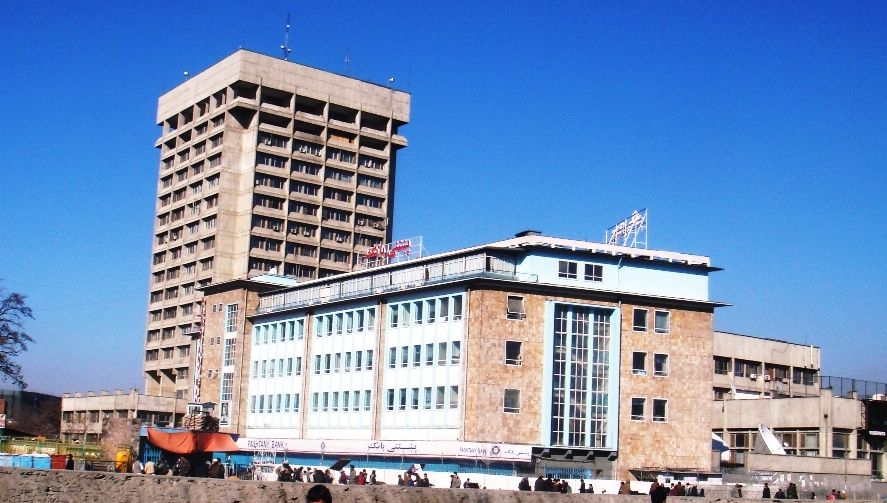
Pashtany Bank and the brutalist Kabul Tower

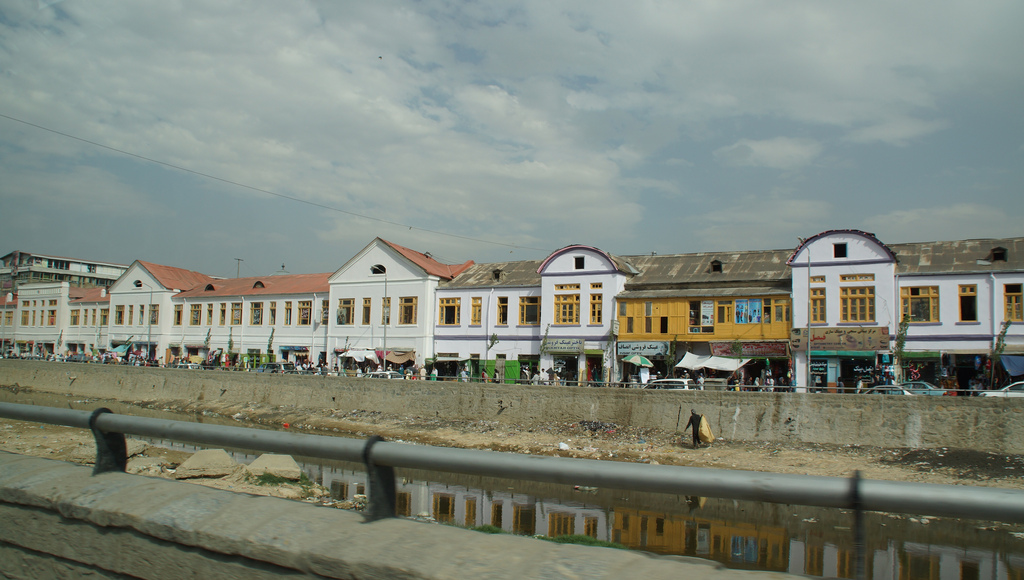
Andarabi Road dwellings on the riverbank

Ahmad Shah Durrani's rise as the Afghan ruler brought changes to Kabul and the nation, with a more inward-looking and self-protecting society reflecting the architecture that was no different between the rich and poor peoples. The Mausoleum of Timur Shah Durrani is another example of Islamic design, built in an octagonal structure. It follows Central Asian traditions of decorative brick masonries along with a colorless appearance. After the Second Anglo-Afghan War, Emir Abdur Rahman Khan brought European styles for the first time. The Bagh-e Bala Palace was designed in a mixed Mughal and British Indian style, the first significant change from traditional Afghan and Islamic styles. However, palaces were still built with Central Asian Islamic design at heart. Numerous lavish buildings were created during that time, combined with large gardens. The Dilkusha Palace within the Arg was the first created by a British architect. Its accompanying clock tower, c. 1911, was also a British creation.

Houses in Kabul during that time were generally made up of walled compounds, built around courtyards and having narrow passageways to places.

In the 1920s, new styles were strongly influenced by European architectural styles due to King Amanullah Khan's visits to Europe, particularly Berlin and Paris. Darul Aman Palace is the best known example of modern Western design. The Shah-Do Shamshira Mosque was built in an unusual style for a mosque in Western and Italian style baroque. The Taq-e Zafar in Paghman and other landmarks there are also based on European designs. Houses also became more open, without having many of the walls. Later in the century, several Soviet inspired designs made its way into Kabul. Most notable of these were the various microraions built in the city in the 1960s and afterwards. A different flavor of modern style was seen on the Hotel Inter-Continental Kabul and Serena Hotel.

In the 21st century, modern designs based on glass facades became popular. Examples of this modern Western style are the Kabul City Center, Kabul City Walk, Kabul Business Center, Majid Mall, and Azim Tower. The National Assembly building, which was built by the government of India, has elements of modern Islamic Mughal architecture, considered to have the largest dome in Asia. Its carving and large porch represent Afghan traditional architectural forms. The new Ministry of Defense building follows traditional, Islamic and Western designs inspired by the Pentagon. Another mix of these designs appear on the Paghman Hill Castle. Increasing numbers of high rises have been built in this period, with the Kabul Markaz Tower in 2020 becoming the city's first to break the 100 m (330 ft) tall barrier. The construction boom with modern high-rises throughout the 2010s had led to a major change in the city's skyline. In recent years Kabul has been more applying Turkish architecture.

=== Environment ===
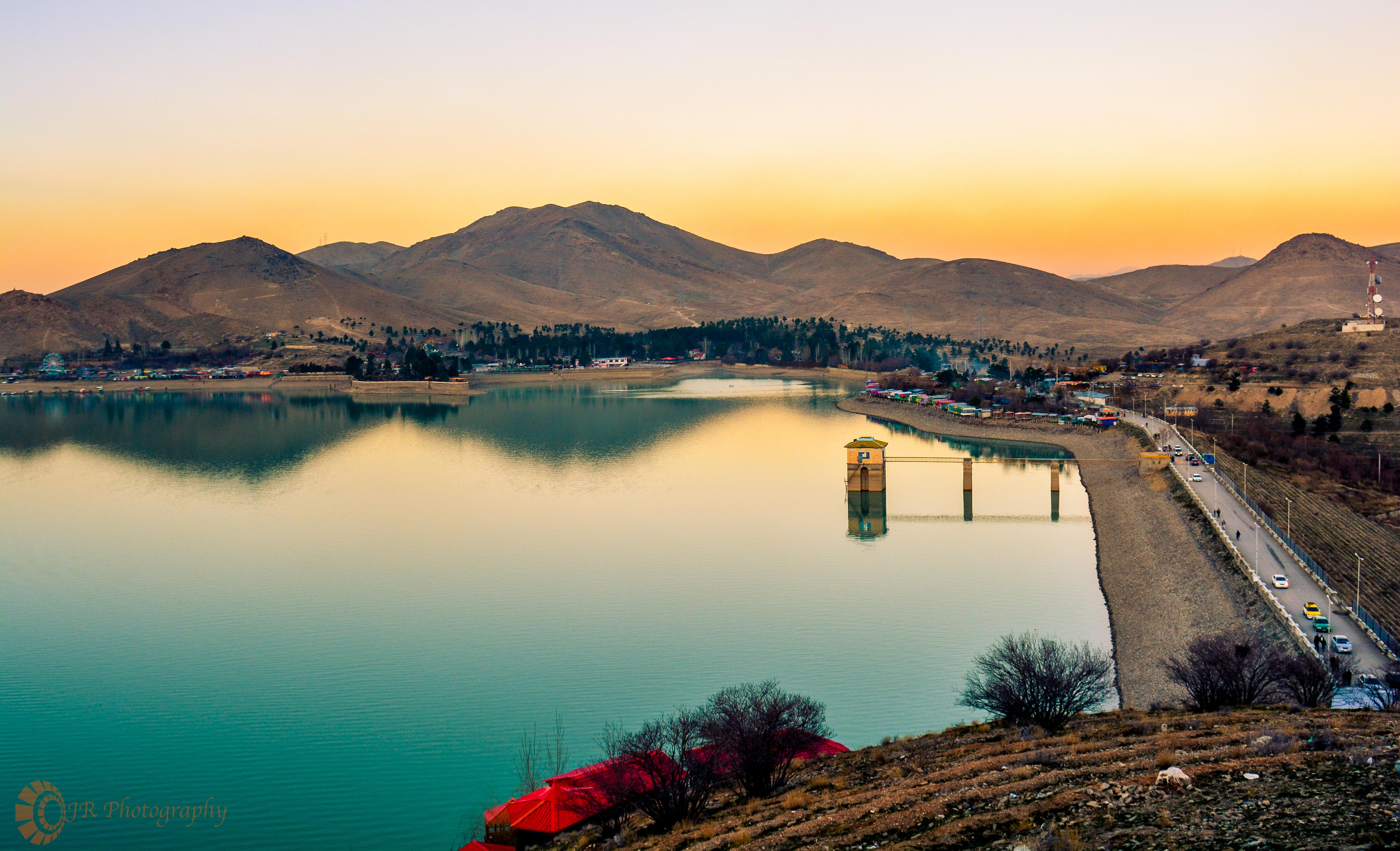
Qargha Dam

The Paghman River flows downstream from Paghman and joins the Kabul River near Kabul Zoo and Bagh-e Babur. The Kabul River then flows through the heart of the city, dividing the central bazaars. There are several bridges (puls) crossing the rivers, the major ones being Pul-e Company, Pul-e Shah-Do Shamshira, Pul-e Bagh-e Omomi, Pul-e Khishti, and Pul-e Mahmoud. Due to climate change, since the 21st century, the river runs dry most of the year, only filling up in the wetter winter and spring seasons.

Hashmat Khan Lake is located to the southeast of the old part of the city. It provides a critical resting place to thousands of birds who fly between the Indian subcontinent and Siberia. In 2017 the government declared the lake a protected area. Some rare species of birds have been spotted at the lake, such as the Eastern imperial eagle and the Dalmatian pelican. Kabul's other large lake is at Qargha Dam, located some 9 km (5.6 mi) northwest from the city's center.

Air pollution continues to be a major problem in the city during the winter season, when many residents burn coal and low-quality fuel. Parts of the city also face water shortage, which is being addressed. The city relies mainly on deep wells most of which have already fallen dry. About 99% of Kabul's population has access to clean drinking water. Major companies that provide bottled drinking water include Alokozay, Aria, Cristal, Noshaq, Pamir and others. The standard price is 10 afghanis for a 500ml (16.9 oz) bottle and 140 afghanis for a 5 gallon jug. Cristal is the expensive brand followed by Alokozay. Some neighborhoods receive tap water from nearby water supply networks.

== Demographics ==
The Kabul municipality has an estimated population of 5,333,284 people. The population has long fluctuated due to wars, exoduses and repatriations. The lack of an up-to-date census means that there are various estimates of the population. It was estimated to have been about 10,000 in 1700; 65,000 by 1878; 120,000 by 1940; and around 500,000 in 1979, while another source claims 337,715 as of 1976. This figure rose to about 1.5 million by 1988, before dramatically dropping in the 1990s.

Kabul has historically been the most ethnically diverse city in the country, with the population including Afghans from all over the country. A 2003 National Geographic article had put Kabul's population at being 45% Tajik, 25% Pashtun, 25% Hazara, 2% Uzbek, 1% Baloch, 1% Turkmen, and 1% Afghan Hindu. It became one of the fastest-growing cities in the world, with its population growing fourfold from 2001 to 2014. This was partly due to better security and living condition. This resulting rapid urbanisation means that many residents began living in informal settlements. In the early 16th century, Babur described Kabulistan in his memoirs by stating the following:

There are many differing tribes in the Kābul country; in its dales and plains are Turks and clansmen and ‘Arabs; in its town and in many villages, Sārts; out in the districts and also in villages are the Pashāī, Parājī, Tājīk, Bīrkī and Afghān tribes. In the western mountains are the Hazāra and Nikdīrī tribes, some of whom speak the Mughūlī tongue. In the north-eastern mountains are the places of the Kāfirs, such as Kitūr (Gawār?) and Gibrik. To the south are the places of the Afghān tribes. Eleven or twelve tongues are spoken in Kābul—‘Arabī, Persian, Turkī, Mughūlī, Hindī, Afghānī, Pashāī, Parājī, Gibrī, Bīrkī, and Lamghānī. If there be another country with so many differing tribes and such a diversity of tongues, it is not known.

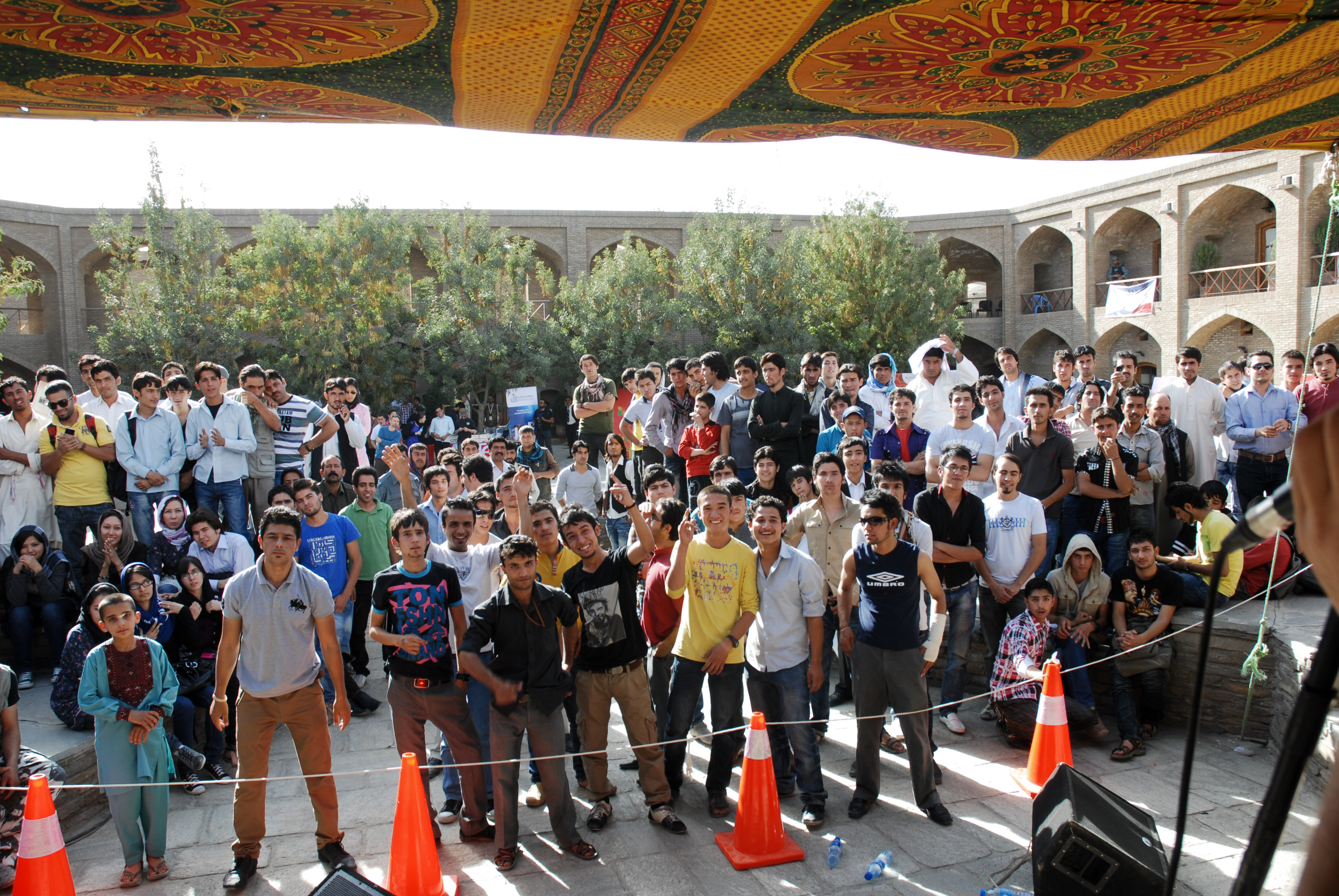
Men and women inside the Gardens of Babur in 2011

The broader province of Kabul is dominated by Pashtuns and Tajiks. Dari and Pashto are the main languages in and around the city, although Dari has long served as the lingua franca. It is a dialect of Persian language. Multilingualism is common throughout the area.

The demonym "Kabuli" (کابلی) refers to a native of the city, who is generally ethnic-neutral, understands Dari and Pashto, and more educated than those from villages. Since the early 1980s, many Kabulis have left the country and began a new life in other countries.

Around 90% of the city's population follow Sunni Islam while 10% are Shias, who are mostly Hazaras and reside in the Dashte Barchi area. There may also be hundreds of Afghan Sikhs and Afghan Hindus. It is estimated that there were 500–8,000 Afghan Christians in the country as a whole; due to restrictions on religious freedom, they often worship in secret, rendering it difficult to estimate the number of Christians in Kabul specifically.

=== The Jewish community ===
Jews had a presence in Afghanistan from ancient times until 2021. There are records of religious correspondence establishing the presence of Jews in Kabul since the 8th century, though it is believed that they were present centuries or even millennia earlier. The 12th century Arab geographer Muhammad al-Idrisi wrote down his observations of a Jewish quarter in Kabul. In the early 19th century, Kabul and other major Afghan cities became sites of refuge for Jews fleeing persecution in neighbouring Iran.

Jews were generally tolerated for most of their time in Afghanistan, up until the passage of anti-Jewish laws in the 1870s. Jews were given a reprieve under the rule of King Nadir Shah until his assassination in 1933. The influence of Nazi propaganda led to increased violence against Jews and the ghettoization of their communities in Kabul and Herat. Most of Afghanistan's Jews fled the country or congregated in these urban hubs.

After the establishment of the state of Israel, the Jewish community requested permission from King Zahir Shah to migrate there. Afghanistan was the only country that allowed its Jewish residents to migrate to Israel without relinquishing their citizenship. Most of those remaining, approximately 2,000 in number, left after the Soviet invasion in 1979.

As of 1992, there were believed to be two Jews remaining in Afghanistan, both living in a synagogue in Kabul. The congregation's Torah scroll was confiscated during the first Islamic Emirate. Zebulon Simontov was believed and widely reported to be Afghanistan's last Jew, until Tova Moradi fled months after him, with her grandchildren. Moradi, who harbored a rabbi in her home throughout the first Islamic Emirate, lived in Morad Khane, Kabul, for decades. While she was married to a Muslim man as a child, she still covertly attended synagogue and tried to teach her children what Hebrew prayers she could remember from her childhood. As of her departure in November 2021, there are believed to be no Jews in Afghanistan.

== Economy ==
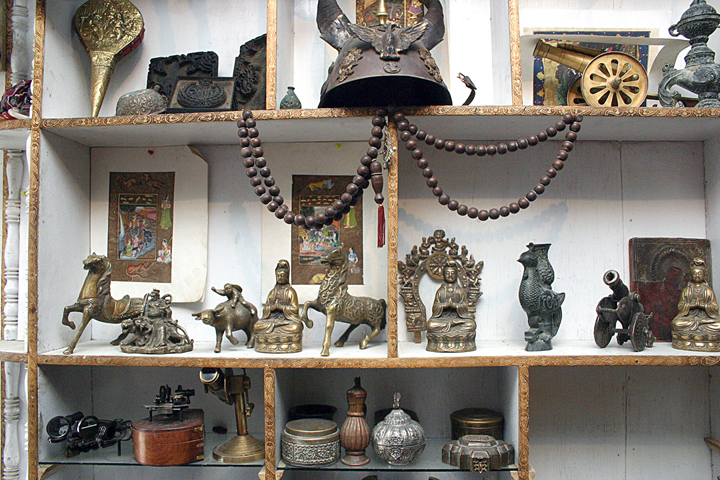
Inside an antiquity shop in Shahr-e Naw

Kabul is the economic center of Afghanistan. Agricultural and other products from all parts of the country enter the city through the Afghanistan Ring Road. The Kabul International Airport also plays a role in this. The city has a number of industrial parks, including many shopping districts, banks, manufacturers, retailers, business centers, real estate developers, hotels, and restaurants. The major shopping districts are located around the Mausoleum of Timur Shah Durrani, Abdul Rahman Mosque and Chaman-e-Hozori, including in Shahr-e Naw, Karte Char, Khair Khana, and Dashte Barchi. A new shopping area was developed next to the Kabul-Jalalabad Road, across from Bagrami industrial area in the Kart-e Naw neighborhood. Modern indoor shopping places are also plentiful in all parts of the city.

Kabul has many hotels and guest houses. The good ones are in the Shahr-e Naw and Wazir Akbar Khan neighborhoods (the Green Zone). The following are some of the hotels in Kabul (in alphabetical order).

- Baron Hotel
- Central Hotel
- Darya Village Hotel
- Golden Star Hotel
- Kabul Inter-Continental
- Kabul Grand Hotel
- Kabul Star Hotel
- Kabul Taj Hotel
- Khyber Hotel
- Park Star Hotel
- Safi Landmark Hotel
- Spinzar Hotel
- Zohak Village

=== Tourism ===
The old part of Kabul is filled with bazaars nestled along its narrow, crooked streets, examples being the Mandawi and the Bird Market (Ka Foroshi). Cultural sites include: the National Museum of Afghanistan, notably displaying an impressive statue of Surya excavated at Khair Khana, the magnificent Darul Aman Palace, the tomb of Mughal Emperor Babur at Bagh-e Babur, the Chihil Sutun palace and gardens, the Minar-i-Istiqlal (Column of Independence) built in 1919 after the Third Afghan War, the Mausoleum of Timur Shah Durrani, the Bagh-e Bala Palace and the imposing Eidgah Mosque (founded 1893). Bala Hissar is a fort which was partially destroyed during the Second Anglo-Afghan War, then restored as a military college. The Koh-e Asamai mountain has a temple that was considered important to Afghan Hindus.

Other places of interest include Zazai Park, City Park, Kabul Zoo, Abdul Rahman Mosque, Shah-Do Shamshira and other famous mosques, the National Gallery of Afghanistan, the National Archives of Afghanistan, Afghan Royal Family Mausoleum, the OMAR Mine Museum, Wazir Akbar Khan Hill, Kabul Cemetery, and nearby Paghman which is best known for the Paghman Hill Castle, the famous Taq-e Zafar, and the new Adei Villas.

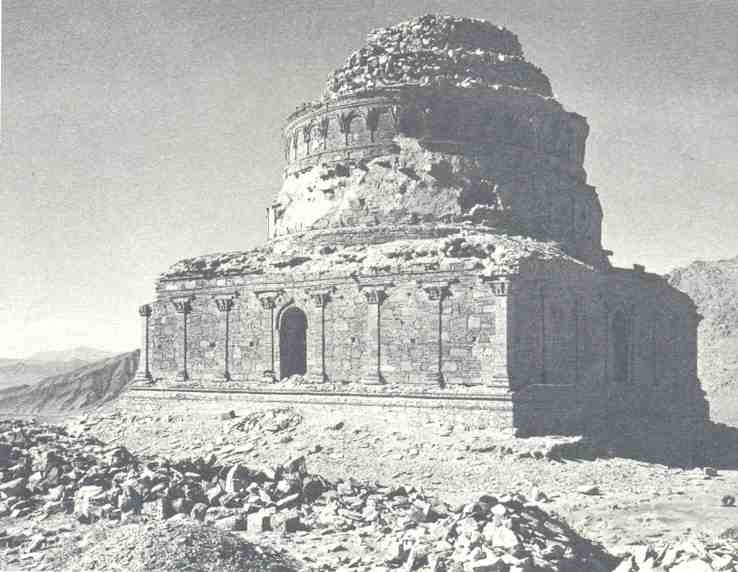
Buddhist stupa of Guldara

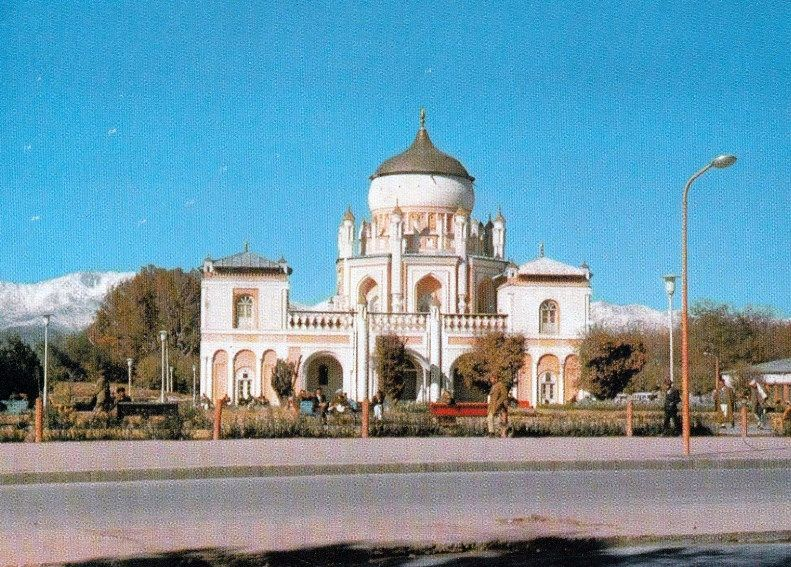
Mausoleum of Emir Abdur Rahman Khan inside Zarnegar Park

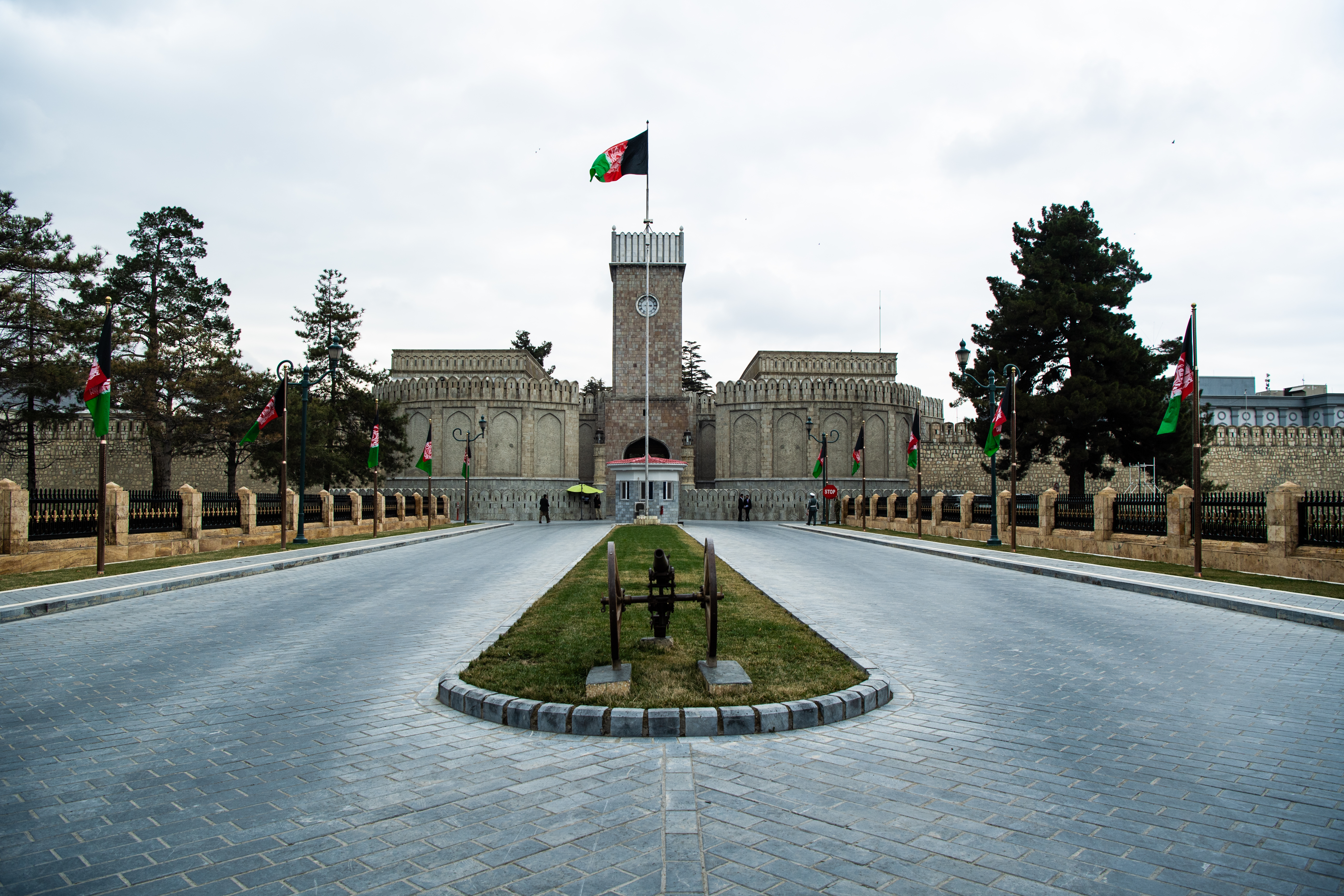
Arg (Presidential Palace)

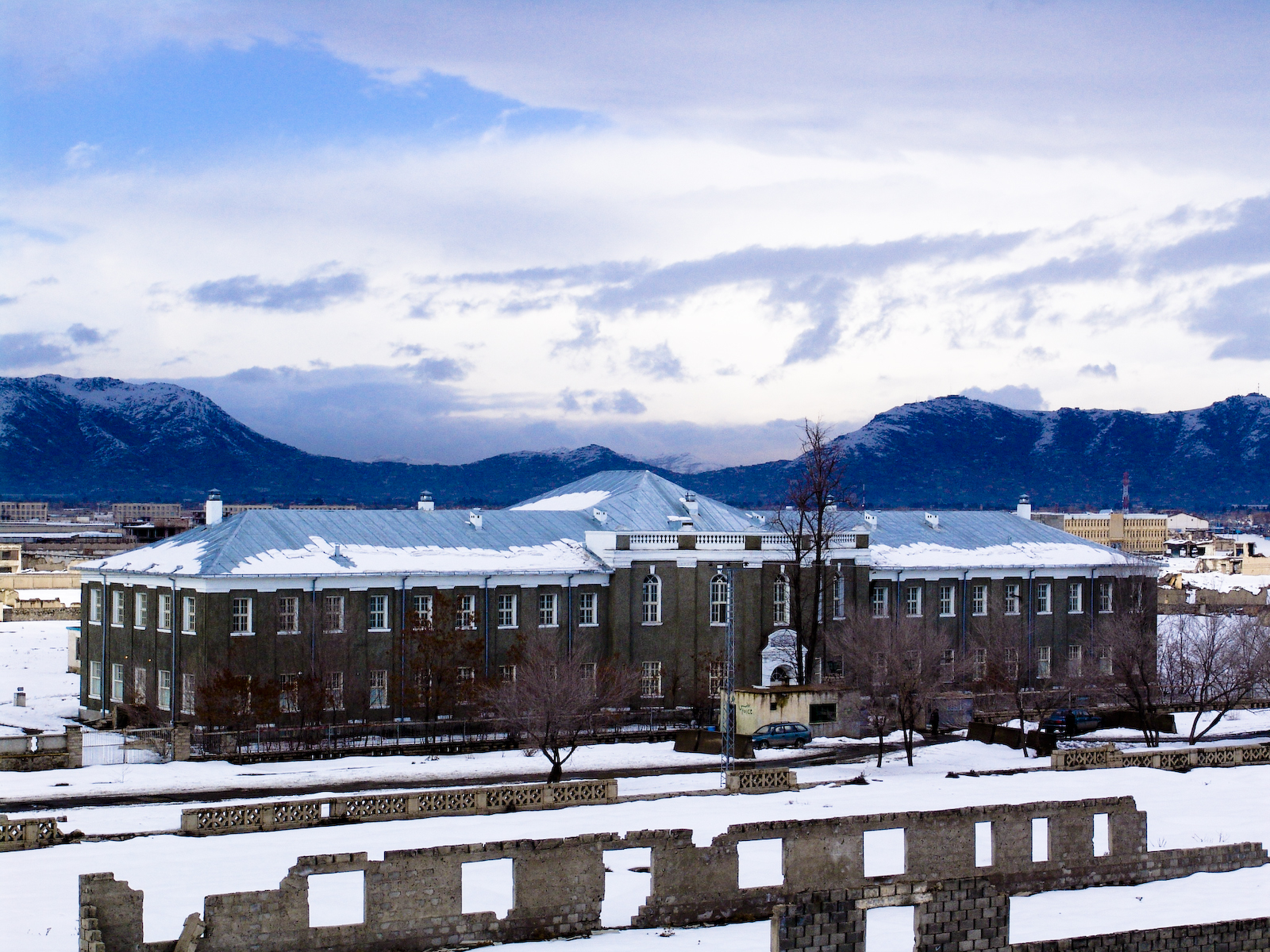
National Museum of Afghanistan

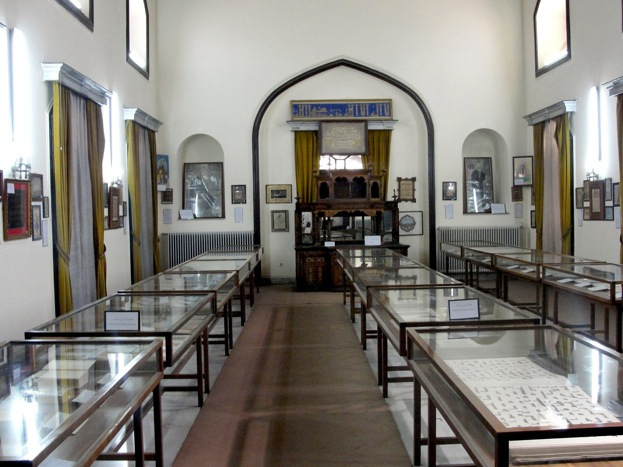
National Archives of Afghanistan

Maranjan Hill is where Buddhist statues and Graeco-Bactrian coins from the 2nd century BC have been found. The hill is currently undergoing a major makeover. Outside the city proper lies the Buddhist Guldara stupa and another stupa at Shewaki.

- Mausoleums
  - Mausoleum of Abdur Rahman Khan
  - Mausoleum of Jamal al-Din al-Afghani at Kabul University
  - Mausoleum of Timur Shah Durrani
  - Mausoleum of Zahir Shah, Nadir Shah and other members of the royal Musahiban family at Maranjan Hill
- Mosques
  - Abdul Rahman Mosque
  - Abul Fazl Shrine
  - Eidgah Mosque
  - Mullah Omar Mosque at Wazir Akbar Khan Hill
  - Pul-e Khishti Mosque
  - Sakhi Shrine
  - Shah-Do Shamshira Mosque
  - Sirajuddin Haqqani Mosque at Maranjan Hill (under construction)
- Museums
  - National Archives of Afghanistan
  - National Gallery of Afghanistan
  - National Museum of Afghanistan
  - Negaristani Milli
- Palaces
  - Presidential Palace, including numerous other palaces inside the compound
  - Bagh-e Bala Palace
    - Char Chenar Palace
  - Chihil Sutun Palace
  - Darul Aman Palace
    - Delgusha Palace and its clock tower
    - Haram Sara Palace
    - Kuti Baghcha
    - Salam Khana Palace
  - Shah Bobo Jan Palace
  - Stor Palace
  - Tajbeg Palace
- Parks and gardens - The city has a growing number of urban parks and playgrounds. Below is a list of some of the parks, gardens, and recreation places.
  - Alauddin Park in Kārte Seh
  - Azadi Park (under renovation)
  - Bagh-e Chihil Sutun (Gardens of Chihil Sutun)
  - Bagh-e Bala Park
  - Bagh-e Zanana
  - Bibi Mahro Park
  - City Park
  - Gardens of Babur
  - Golayi Park in Khair Khana
  - Habibullah Zazai Park
  - Haji Mohammad Dad Hill
  - Qargha (recreation area)
  - Shahr-e Naw Park
  - Wazir Akbar Khan Park
  - Zarnegar Park
- Other landmarks
  - Clock tower at Mahmoud Khan Bridge
  - Minaret of Knowledge and Ignorance
  - Minaret of the Unknown Corps on Jada-e Maiwand
  - Sherpur Cantonment (British cemetery)

== Sports ==
Cricket and football are the popular sports in Afghanistan. Other sports people enjoy are futsal and volleyball.

Professional sports teams from Kabul

Club	League	Sport	Venue	Established
Kabul Zwanan	Afghanistan Premier League	Cricket	Sharjah Cricket Stadium	2018
Kabul Eagles	Shpageeza Cricket League	Cricket	Kabul International Cricket Stadium; Ayoubi Cricket Stadium	2015
Istiqlal FC	Afghanistan Champions League	Football	Ghazi Stadium AFF Stadium	2004

- Sports complexes
  - Kabul International Cricket Stadium
  - Ghazi Stadium used for football
  - Olympic Committee Gymnasium

== Law and government ==
The city of Kabul is administratively divided into five zones and 22 municipal districts. Mawlawi Abdul Rashid serves as the current mayor of the city. The Kabul Municipality's structure consists of 17 departments under the mayor. Like other provincial municipalities in Afghanistan, the Kabul Municipality deals with city affairs such as infrastructure developments. The city districts (nāhia) collect certain taxes and issue building licenses. Each city district has a district head appointed by the mayor, and lead six major departments in the district office. The neighborhood organization structure at the nahia level is called a gozar. Kabul is divided into 630 Gozars. A wakil-e gozar is a person chosen to represent a community within a city district.

The Kabul police force is part of the Afghan National Police under the Ministry of Interior, which is headed by Sirajuddin Haqqani, and is arranged by city districts. The Police Chief is selected by the Interior Minister and is responsible for all law enforcement activities.

=== Districts ===
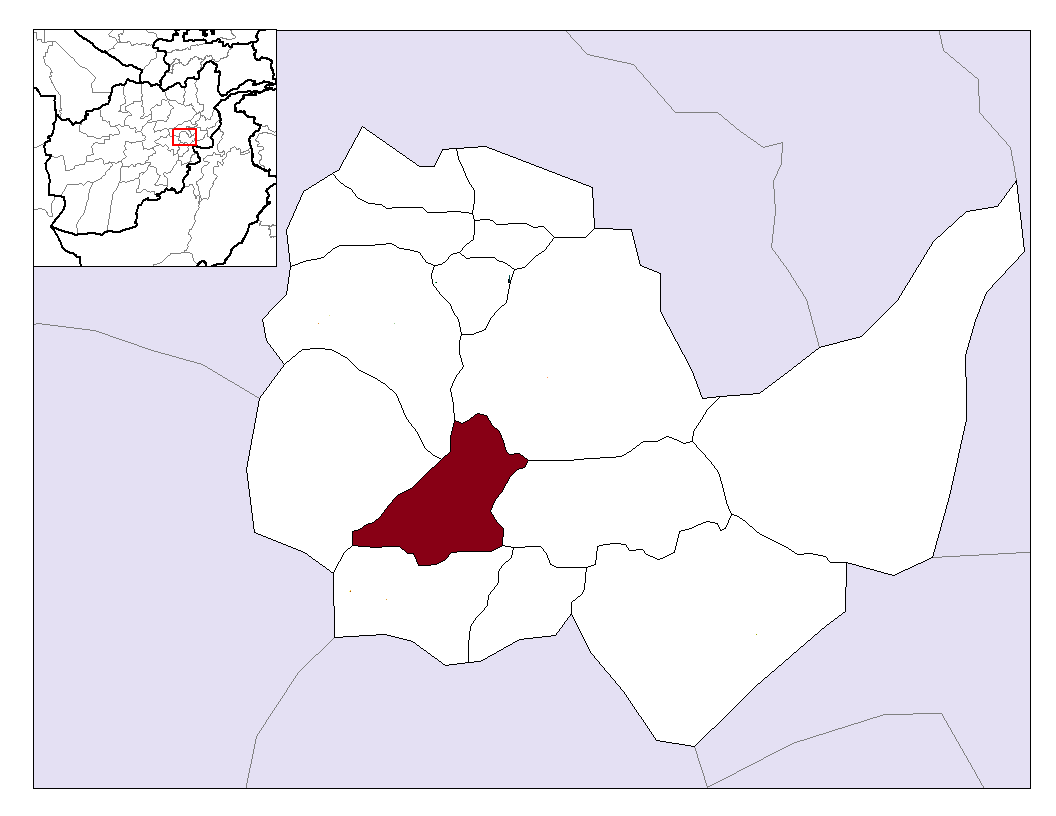
Location of Kabul Municipality within Kabul Province

The city of Kabul is located within Kabul District, which is one of the 15 districts of Kabul Province. As the provincial capital, it forms a municipality (shārwāli) which is further divided into 22 administrative districts called municipal districts or city districts (nāhia), which coincide with the official Police Districts (PD). The number of city districts increased from 11 to 18 in 2005, and then to 22 by 2010 after the incorporation of Districts 14 and 19–22 which were annexed by Kabul Municipality from surrounding rural districts. The city limits have thus substantially increased. District 1 contains most of the old city. Downtown Kabul mostly consists of Districts 2, 4 and 10. In addition, Districts 3 and 6 house many commercial and governmental points of interests.

The table below shows the 22 city districts and their settlements, with information about its land size and usage, accurate as of 2011.

City districts of Kabul

Name	Location	Settlements	Area	Urban area	Agricultural area	Vacant area	Location map
District 1 ناحیه ۱	Central	Chindawol; Kharabat (street); Jadayi Maiwand (street); Mandawi (street); Rika Khana; Shur Bazar	4.67 km²	65.3%	~0%	18.9%	
District 2 ناحیه ۲	Central	Andarabi; Baharistan; Deh Afghanan; Karte Ariana; Karte Parwan (part); Murad Khane; Shash Darak (part)	6.76 km²	72.6%	0%	7.3%	
District 3 ناحیه ۳	West	Deh Bori; Deh Mazang; Deh Naw; Jamal Mina; Karte Char; Karte Mamorin (part); Karte Sakhi; Silo (street, part)	9.22 km²	82%	0.6%	8.8%	
District 4 ناحیه ۴	Northwest	Karte Parwan (part); Kolola Pushta; Shahrara; Shahr-e Naw; Taimani	11.63 km²	83.1%	1%	6%	
District 5 ناحیه ۵	West	Afshar; Fazel Baig; Karte Mamorin (part); Khushal Khan Mena; Kote Sangi/Mirwais Maidan; Silo (street, part); Qala-e Wazir	29.2 km²	49.6%	14%	30.9%	
District 6 ناحیه ۶	Southwest	Darulaman; Karte Seh; Qala-e Shada	49.1 km²	32.5%	13.5%	50.8%	
District 7 ناحیه ۷	South	Aqa Ali Shams; Chihil Sutun; Deh Dana; Gozar Gah; Wassel Abad	32.5 km²	46.8%	17%	31.6%	
District 8 ناحیه ۸	Southeast	Beni Hisar; Karte Naw; Rahman Mina; Qalacha; Shah Shahid	48.4 km²	33.7%	33.9%	25.1%	
District 9 ناحیه ۹	Northeast	Karte Wali; Mikrorayon (2nd, 3rd, 4th); Shash Darak (part); Yaka Tut	24.5 km²	48.4%	29.7%	13.7%	
District 10 ناحیه ۱۰	North	Bibi Mahro; Char Qala; Qala-e Fathullah; Qala-e Musa; Sherpur; Wazir Akbar Khan	13.0 km²	75.3%	10.8%	5.6%	
District 11 ناحیه ۱۱	Northwest	Hazara-e Baghal; Khair Khana; Qala-e Najara	17.4 km²	75.4%	0%	21%	
District 12 ناحیه ۱۲	East	Ahmad Shah Baba Mina/Arzan Qimat; Bagrami; But Khak; Shina	34.8 km²	33.2%	42.8%	21.7%	
District 13 ناحیه ۱۳	Southwest	Bist Hazari; Dashte Barchi; Omid-e Sabz (township)	46.6 km²	32%	23.5%	40.2%	
District 14 ناحیه ۱۴	Northwest	Paghman	120.1 km²	8.6%	47%	24.6%	
District 15 ناحیه ۱۵	North	Hamid Karzai Int'l (airfield); Khwaja Bughra; Khwaja Rawash; Qasaba (township)	32.1 km²	32.2%	7.5%	33%	
District 16 ناحیه ۱۶	East	Mikrorayon (1st/Old); Qala-e Zaman Khan; Sement Khana	25.2 km²	37.1%	33.2%	24.1%	
District 17 ناحیه ۱۷	Northwest	Shakar Dara	56.0 km²	16.7%	9.5%	72%	
District 18 ناحیه ۱۸	Northeast	Bakhtiaran; Deh Sabz; Tara Khel	33.9 km²	19.4%	40.2%	29.2%	
District 19 ناحیه ۱۹	Northeast	Pul-e Charkhi	141.4 km²	8.1%	0.05%	77.4%	
District 20 ناحیه ۲۰	South	Char Asiab	143.6 km²	4.1%	17.7%	71.1%	
District 21 ناحیه ۲۱	East	Hudkhel	63.9 km²	1.5%	2.7%	88.1%	
District 22 ناحیه ۲۲	Southeast	Shewaki	79.0 km²	6.5%	24.6%	62.2%	
Total Area			1,022.98 km²				

=== Internet-based participatory planning ===
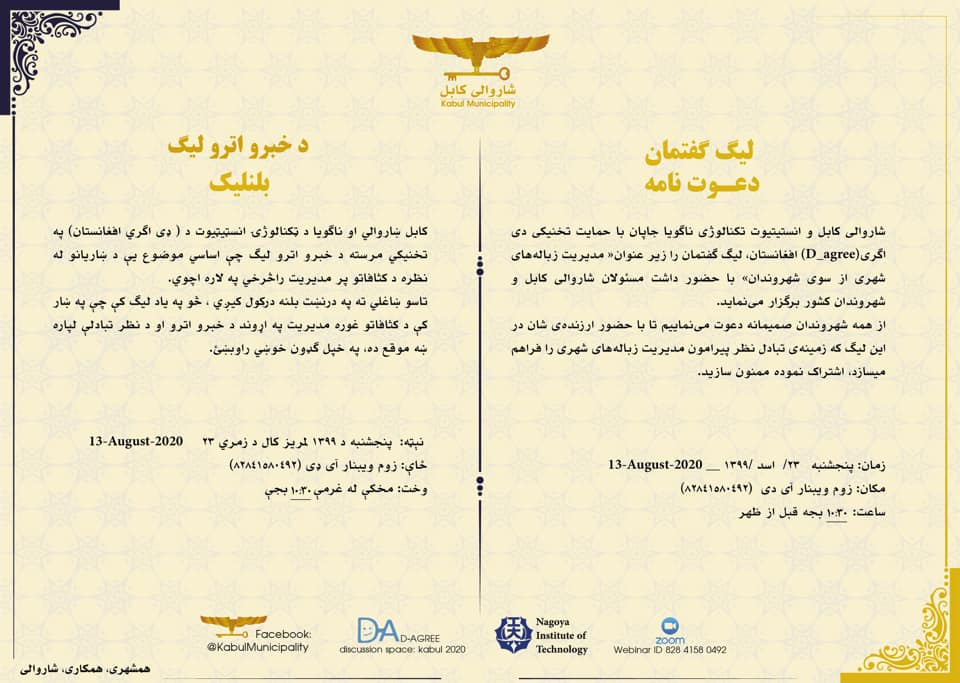
Kabul city announced open calls through the Kabul municipality's HP and its Facebook page, to participate in town meeting and planning process

In 2019, the Nagoya Institute of Technology, in partnership with the Kabul city Municipality, jointly agreed to deploy a digital platform, called D-Agree in urban planning to provide support for stakeholders to promote meaningful public participation and help reach consensus in Kabul city planning process.

From September 2019 until the Fall of Kabul (2021) in August 2021, the platform was used on behalf of Kabul Municipality to moderate more than 300 Kabul city-related planning discussions. In these discussions, more than 15,000 citizens participated in planning activities hosted by D-Agree and generated more than 71,000 opinions which catalogued into issue-based information system regarding urban-related thematic areas. Despite the Taliban take-over, D-Agree will continue to play an important role in facilitating urban planning and infrastructure-related consultations.

In 2022, United Nations reported that D-Agree Afghanistan is used as a digital and smart city solutions in Afghanistan.

D-Agree, is a discussion support platform with artificial intelligence–based facilitation. The discussion trees in D-Agree, inspired by issue-based information system, contain a combination of four types of elements: issues, ideas, pros, and cons. The software extracts a discussion's structure in real time based on IBIS, automatically classifying all the sentences.

== Healthcare ==
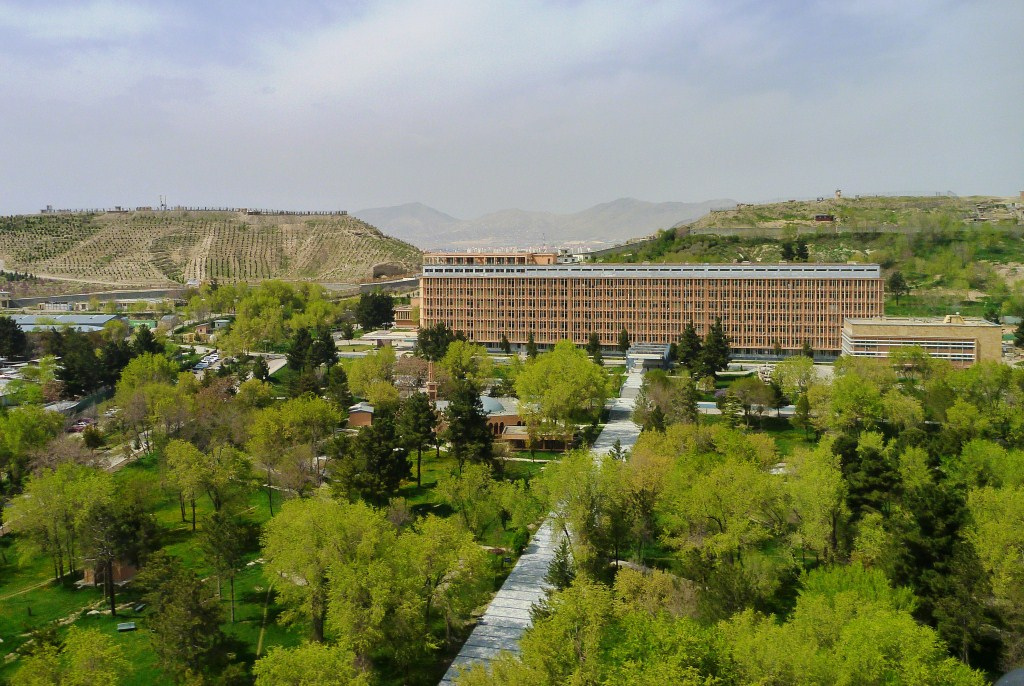
Daoud Khan Military Hospital

Healthcare in Afghanistan has improved in the last two decades. There are over 3,000 hospitals and clinics in the country, with the more trusted ones being in Kabul.

- ADEI Medical Complex
- Afghan-Japan Hospital
- Afshar Hospital
- Ahmad Shah Baba Hospital
- Ariana Medical Complex
- Atatürk Children's Hospital
- CURE International Hospital
- Daoud Khan Military Hospital
- French Medical Institute for Children
- Indira Gandhi Children's Hospital
- Jamhuriat Hospital
- Jinnah Hospital
- Malalai Maternity Hospital
- Maywand Hospital
- Rabia-I-Balki Maternity Hospital
- Wazir Akbar Khan Hospital

== Education ==
The Ministry of Education and the Ministry of Higher Education are responsible for the education system in Afghanistan. Public and private schools exist in all parts of the city. High schools include:

- Abdul Hadi Dawi High School, a school for boys
- Afghan Turk High Schools, Turkish-Afghan schools
- Amani High School, a German-Afghan school for boys founded in 1924
- Ghulam Haider Khan High School, a school for boys
- Habibia High School, a British-Afghan school founded in 1903 by King Habibullah Khan
- International School of Kabul, an American-Afghan school
- Lycée Esteqlal, a Franco-Afghan school founded in 1922
- Malalai High School, a Franco-Afghan school for girls
- Nazo Ana High School, a school for boys
- Rahman Baba High School, an American-Afghan school for boys

=== Universities ===
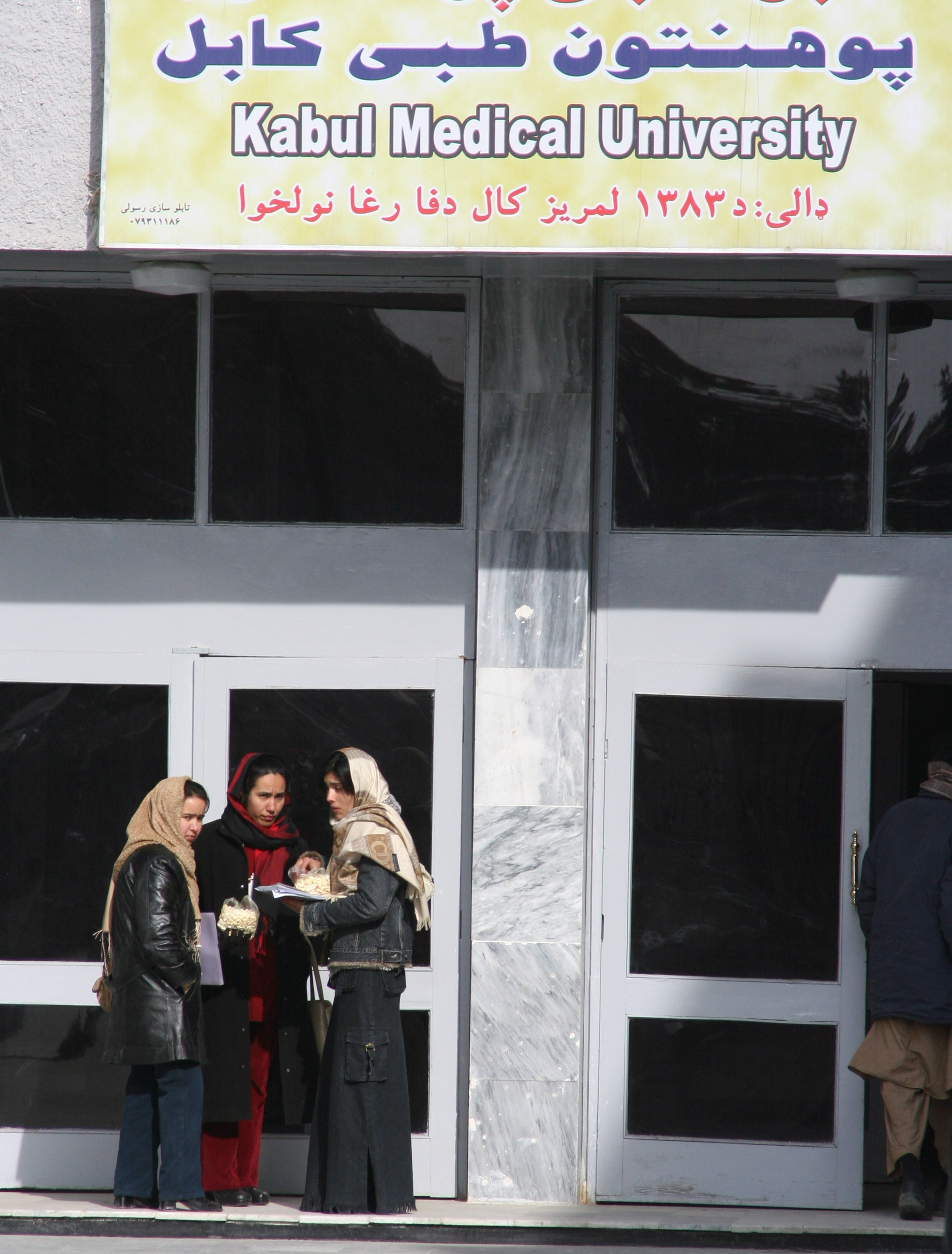
Kabul Medical University

Universities include:

- Afghanistan Institute Of Higher Education
- Afghan National Security University
- American University of Afghanistan
- Bakhtar University
- Dawat University
- Dunya University of Afghanistan
- Gawharshad Institute of Higher Education
- Gharjistan University
- Kaboora Institute of Higher Education
- Kabul Education University of Rabbani
- Kabul Health Sciences Institute
- Kabul Medical University
- Kabul Polytechnic University
- Kabul University
- Karwan University
- Kardan University
- Kateb University
- Khatam Al-Nabieen University
- Maryam University
- Mashal University
- Qalam institute of higher education
- Rana Institute of Higher Education
- Rifah Afghanistan Institute
- Salam University

== Transportation ==
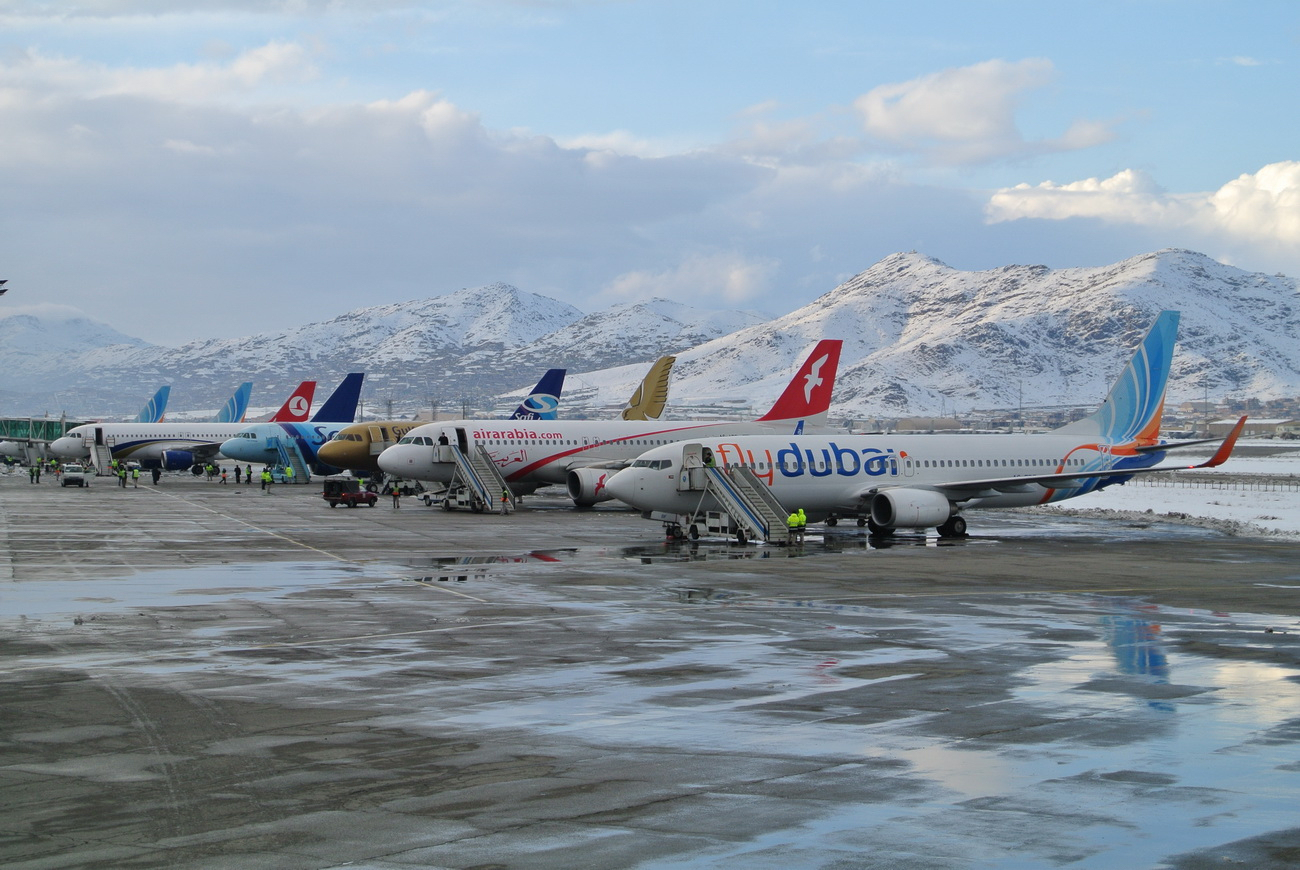
Flightline at Kabul International Airport

=== Air ===
Kabul International Airport is located 25 km (16 mi) from the centre of Kabul. It is a hub to Ariana Afghan Airlines, the national carrier of Afghanistan, as well as private airlines such as Afghan Jet International, East Horizon Airlines, Kam Air, Pamir Airways, and Safi Airways. Regional airlines such as Etihad Airways, Flydubai, Mahan Air, Turkish Airlines, and others also have regularly scheduled flights to the airport.

=== Road ===
The AH76 highway (or Kabul-Charikar Highway) connects Kabul north towards Charikar, Pol-e Khomri and Mazar-i-Sharif (310 km (190 mi) away), with leading roads to Kunduz (250 km (160 mi) away). The AH77 highway goes west towards Bamiyan Province (150 km (93 mi) away) and Chaghcharan in the central mountains of Afghanistan. To the south-west, the Kabul-Ghazni Highway goes to Ghazni (130 km (81 mi) away) and Kandahar (460 km (290 mi) away). To the south, the Kabul-Gardez Highway connects it to Gardez (100 km (62 mi) away) and Khost. To the east, the Kabul-Jalalabad Highway goes to Jalalabad (120 km (75 mi) away) and ends at Torkham.

Much of the road network in downtown Kabul consists of square or circle intersections (char-rahi). The main square in the city is Pashtunistan Square (named after Pashtunistan), which has a large fountain in it and is located adjacent to the presidential palace, the Central Bank, and other landmarks. The Massoud Circle is located by the U.S. Embassy and has the road leading to the airport. In the old city, Sar-e Chawk roundabout is at the center of Maiwand Road (Jadayi Maiwand). Once all roads led to it, and in the 16th century was called the "navel of Kabul". In the Shahr-e Naw district there are several major intersections: Ansari, Haji Yaqub, Quwayi Markaz, Sedarat, and Turabaz Khan. The latter, named after Turabaz Khan, connecting Flower Street and Chicken Street. There are also two major intersections in western Kabul: the Deh Mazang Circle and Kote Sangi. Salang Watt is the main road to the north-west, whereas Asamayi Watt and Seh Aqrab (also called Sevom Aqrab) is the main road to western Kabul.

The steep population rise in the 21st century had caused major congestion problems for the city's roads. In efforts to tackle this issue, a 95 km outer ring road costing $110 million was approved in 2017. Construction took five years and it runs from Char Asiab via Ahmad Shah Baba Mina, Deh Sabz ("Kabul New City" development area), the AH76 highway, Paghman and back to Char Asyab. A new bus public transport service was also planned to be opened in 2018 (see below). In September 2017, the head of the Kabul Municipality announced that 286 meters of pedestrian overpass footbridges will be built in eight busy areas "in the near future".

Under the Kabul Urban Transport Efficiency Improvement Project that was signed in 2014 and backed by the World Bank, the city is seeing widespread improvements in road conditions, including the building of new pedestrian sidewalks, drainage systems, lighting and asphalted road surfaces.

Majority of vehicles driven in Kabul are made by Toyota. Unregistered vehicles face impoundment by city officials. The number of dealerships have increased from 77 in 2003 to over 550 by 2010. Bicycles on the road are a common sight in the city.

=== Public transport ===
Taxi in Kabul is painted turquoise and usually an older model Toyota Corolla. There are around 40,000 of them in the city. The city's public bus service (Milli Bus / "National Bus") was established in the 1960s to take commuters on daily routes to many destinations. Long-distance road journeys are made by privately-owned buses, which are available at Paitakht (Capital) bus terminal in the Sarai Shomali area of Khair Khana. Another bus terminal is at Dashte Barchi, which take passengers to southern and central areas of Afghanistan.

An electric trolleybus system operated in Kabul from February 1979 to 1992 using Škoda fleet built by a Czechoslovak company. The trolleybus service was highly popular mainly due to its low price compared to the Millie Bus conventional bus service. The last trolleybus came to a halt in late 1992 due to warfare – much of the copper overhead wires were later looted but a few of them, including the steel poles, can still be seen in Kabul today.

In March 2021, a new city bus service was launched in Kabul using American vehicles built by IC Bus, and accompanied by newly built bus stops throughout the city. Five buses entered service on one route which is expected to be expanded to a fleet of 200 buses on 16 different routes.

== Notable people ==
=== Rulers ===
- Gaju Khan Yousafzai (c. 1490–1565), Pashtun revolutionary leader who served under the banner of Sher Shah Sur of the Sur Empire

=== Politicians ===
- Sher Ali Khan (c. 1825–1879), former Emir of Afghanistan
- Abdur Rahman Khan (born between 1840 and 1844 – 1901), Emir of Afghanistan
- Amanullah Khan (1892–1960), Emir of Afghanistan during the Independence War till abdication in 1929
- Habibullāh Kalakāni (1891–1929), Revolutionary rebel leader and ruler of Afghanistan in 1929
- Mohammed Zahir Shah (1914–2007), the last king of Afghanistan
- Hafizullah Amin (1929–1979), former Prime Minister of Afghanistan
- Babrak Karmal (1929–1996), former President of Afghanistan
- Zamina Begum (1917–1978), former Afghan princess and first lady of Afghanistan
- Sibghatullah Mojaddedi (1926–2019), former President of Afghanistan
- Anahita Ratebzad (1931–2014), former Minister of Social Affairs and Tourism of Afghanistan
- Abdullah Abdullah (born 1960), former chief executive officer of Afghanistan
- Shukria Barakzai (born 1970), Afghan politician and former ambassador of Afghanistan to Norway
- Roya Rahmani (born 1978), former Afghan diplomat, who served as Afghanistan's first female ambassador to the United States
- Nasima Razmyar (born 1984), Afghan-Finnish politician

=== Religious figures ===
- Abu Khalid al-Kabuli (live during 7th century), a prominent early Islamic figure, known for his close companionship with Ali Zayn al Abidin, fourth Imam of Shia Islam
- Abu Hanifa (born 7th century), prominent Islamic scholar and the founder of the Hanafi school of jurisprudence, one of the four major Sunni legal schools, whose ancestors hailed from the Kabul region
- Mir Zahid Harawi (born 17th century), religious scholar and historian, worked and died in Kabul
- Sayyid Mir Jan (lived during 19th century) Sufi saint and leader of the Naqshbandi Ishaani Sub-Tariqa
- Mohaqiq Kabuli (born 1928), Twelver Shia Marja'

=== Musicians ===
- Mohammad Hussain Sarahang (1924–1983), singer
- Abdul Rahim Sarban (1930–1993), singer
- Nainawaz (1935–1979), artist, poet and composer
- Farhad Darya (born 1962), singer
- Ahmad Zahir (1946–1979), singer
- Aryana Sayeed (born 1985), singer

=== Athletes ===
- Salim Durani (1934–2023), former cricketer and only Indian Test cricketer to have been born in Afghanistan
- Siyar Bahadurzada (born 1984), mixed martial artist, former Shooto Middleweight Champion, and first athlete from Afghanistan to fight in the UFC
- Asghar Afghan (born 1987), retired cricketer, Afghanistan's former captain who ended his career with the highest T20I wins as captain
- Omar Nazar (born 1978), footballer
- Zubayr Amiri (born 1990), footballer for SC Hessen Dreieich and the Afghanistan national team
- Karim Janat (born 1998), cricketer, brother to Asghar Afghan
- Naveen-ul-Haq (born 1999), cricketer
- Hamid Rahimi (born 1983), boxer

=== Actors and Actresses ===
- Azita Ghanizada (born 1978 or 1979), American actress
- Leena Alam (born 1978), film actress
- Vida Samadzai (born 1978), actress, model and beauty pageant titleholder
- Annet Mahendru (born 1985), Afghan-born American actress
- Ahmad Khan Mahmoodzada (born 1997), former child actor

=== Writers and poets ===
- Saib Tabrizi (born c. 1592) Persian poet who spent several years in Kabul under the patronage of Mirzā Aḥsan-Allāh Ẓafar Khan, the governor of Kabul at the time
- Sayed Askar Mosavi a contemporary Afghan historian, writer, and anthropologist. He was born in Kabul in 1956.
- Khaled Hosseini (born 1965), Afghan-American novelist
- Homeira Qaderi (born 1980), writer
- Nainawaz (1935–1979), artist, poet and composer
- Haroon Yousofi, journalist, poet and satirist

=== Journalists ===
- Sayed Hamid Noori (born 1965), journalist
- Mustafa Nayyem (born 1981), Afghan-Ukrainian journalist who was influential in sparking the Euromaidan
- Yama Wolasmal (born 1982), journalist
- Farahnaz Forotan (born 1992), journalist
- Wahida Faizi (born 1994), journalist

=== Activists ===
- Farida Ahmadi (born 1957), Afghan author and women's rights activist
- Adela Mohseni (born c. 1972), women's rights activist
- Zohra Rasekh (1969–2025), women's rights activist

== Twin towns – sister cities ==
- Pune, India (since 2003)
- Istanbul, Turkey (since 1992)
- Kazan, Russia (since 2005)
- Kansas City, Missouri, United States (since 2018)
- Omaha, Nebraska, United States (since 2003)

== See also ==
- List of cities in Afghanistan
- List of rulers of Kabul
- Timeline of Kabul
