= List of schools in Afghanistan =

This list of schools located in Afghanistan includes the country's primary and secondary schools. According to the Afghan Ministry of Education, there are approximately 18,000 schools across Afghanistan. So this list contains only those with a Wikipedia article. The list is organized alphabetically by province. Afghanistan's tertiary schools are listed on a separate sub-list at List of universities in Afghanistan.

== Balkh Province ==
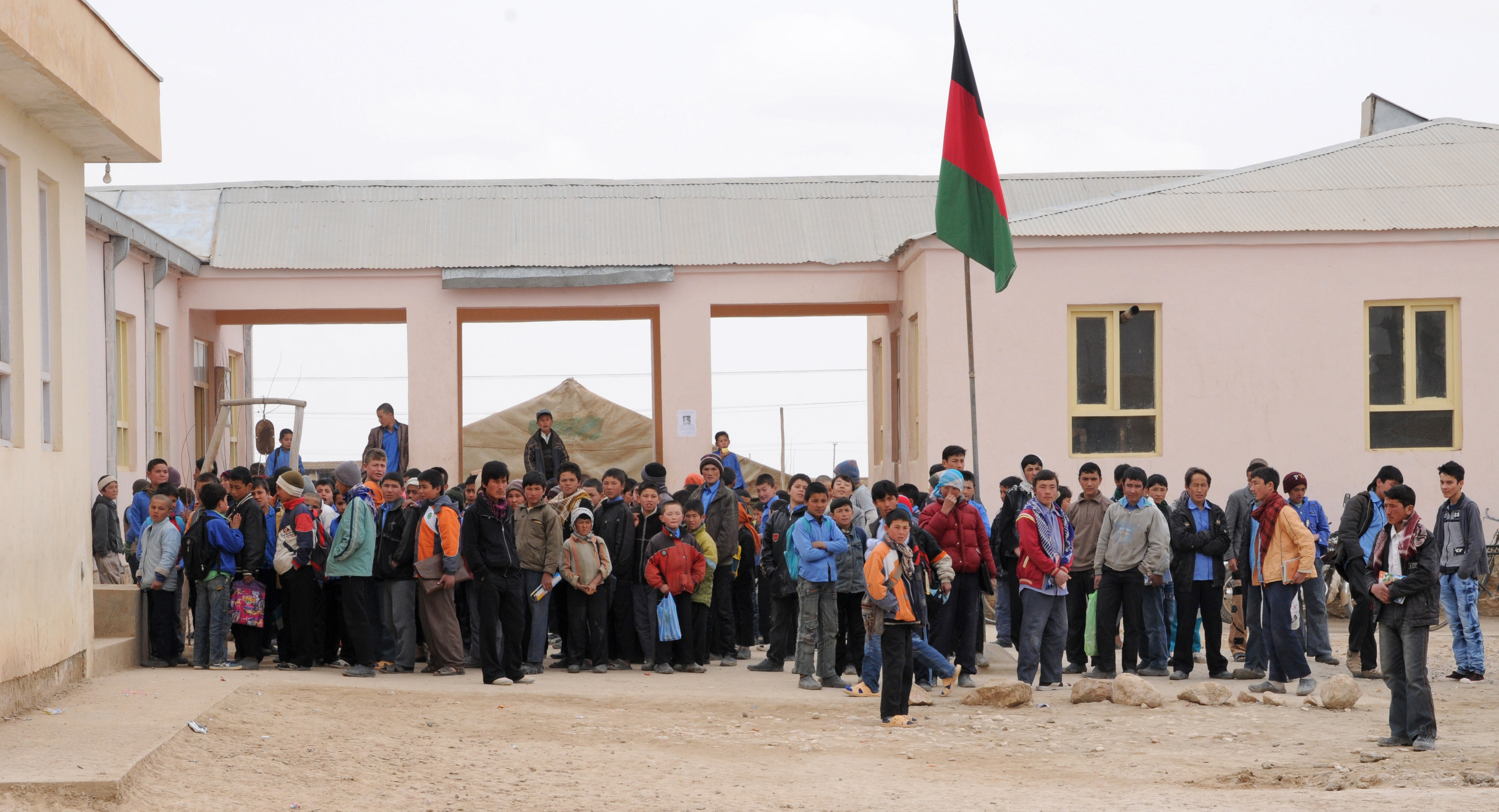
Aliabad School in Balkh Province

- Afghan-Turk High School in Mazar-e-Sharif (private)

== Herat Province ==
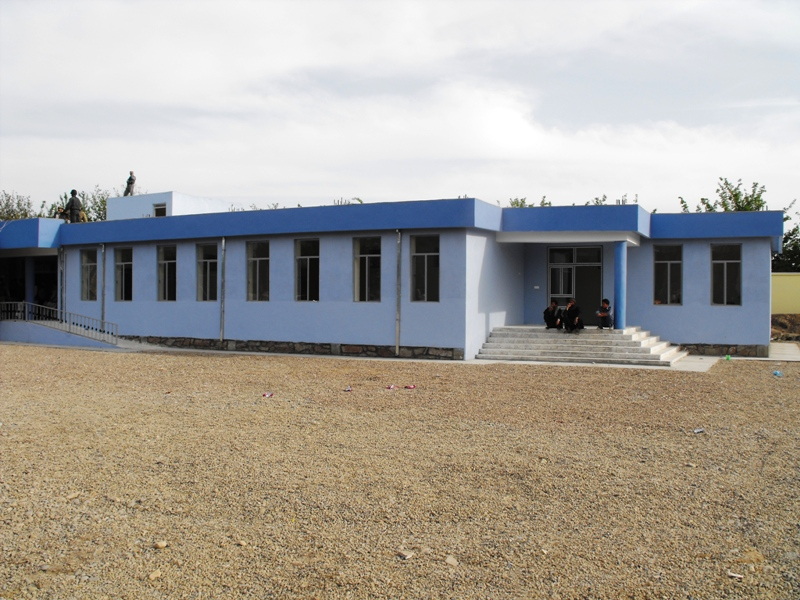
A school in Herat Province

- Afghan-Turk High School (private)

== Jowzjan Province ==
- Afghan-Turk High School in Sheberghan (private)

== Kabul Province ==
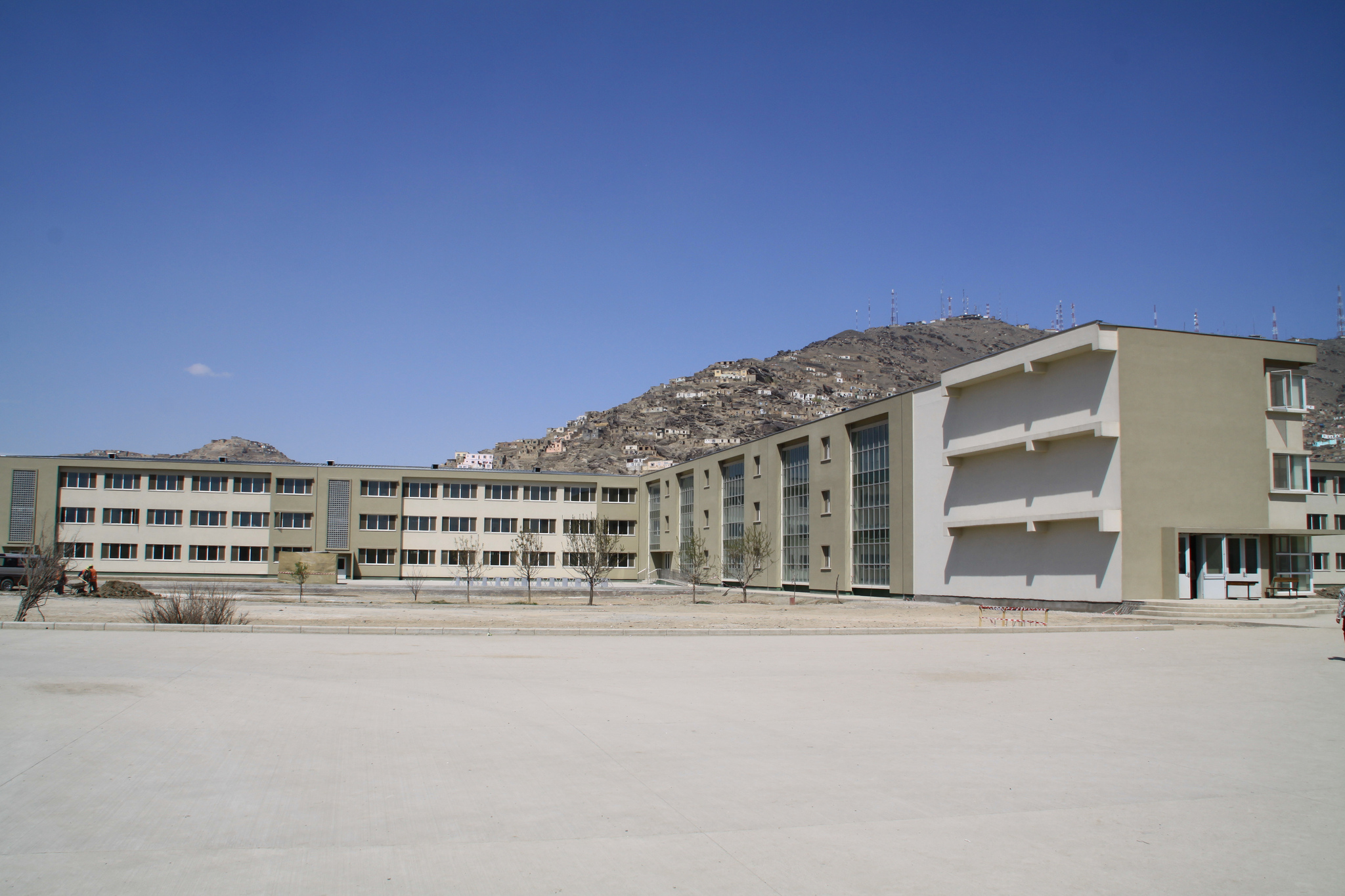
Ghazi High School in Kabul

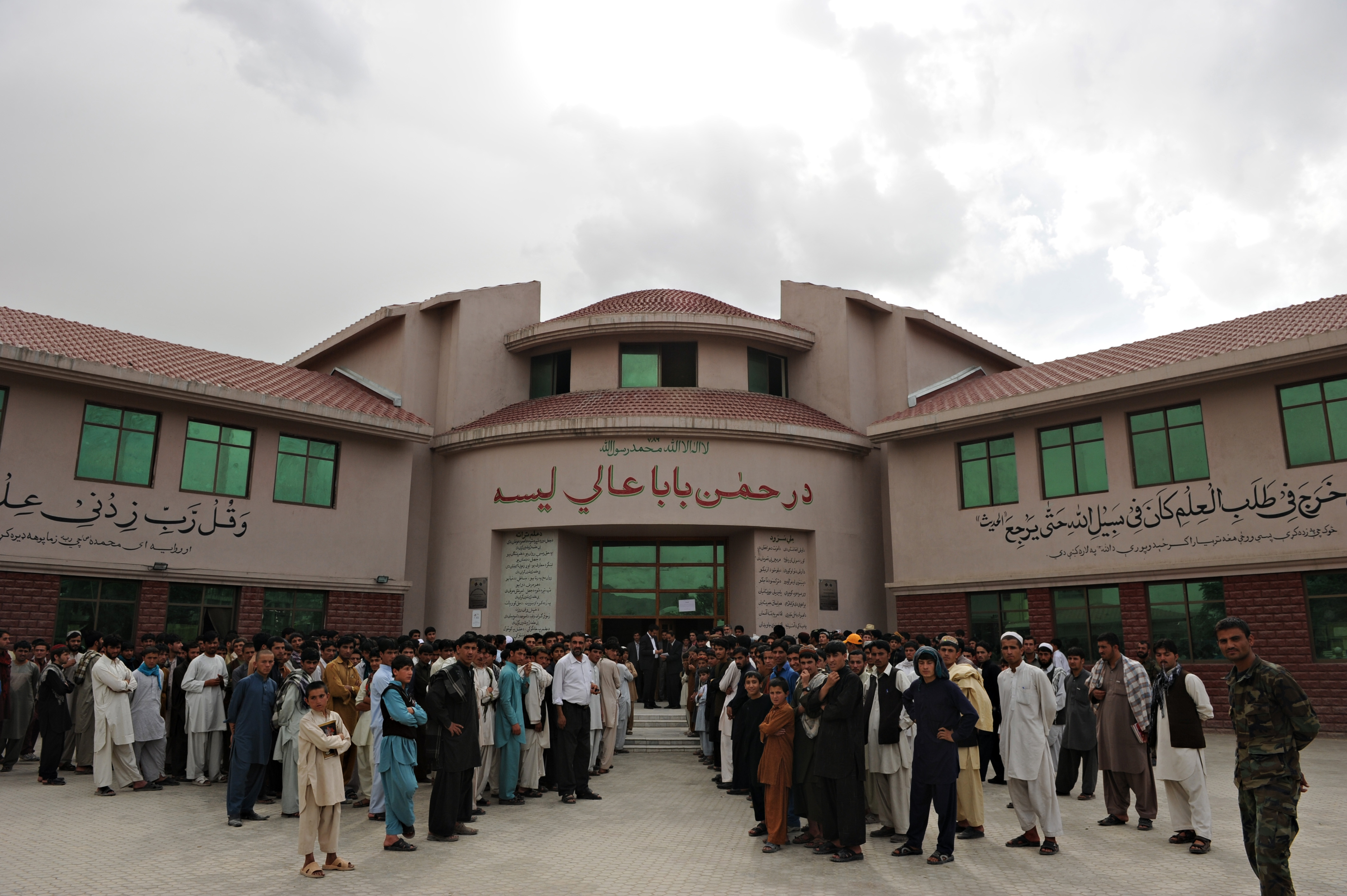
Rahman Baba High School in Kabul

- Afghan-Turk High School (private)
- Afghanistan National Institute of Music
- Afghanistan Relief Organization Technology Education Center (TEC) (co-educational)
- Afghanistan Technical Vocational Institute (co-educational)
- Amani High School (aka Amani–Oberrealschule)
- Esteqlal High School
- Ghazi High School
- Ghulam Haider Khan High School (boys)
- Habibia High School (boys)
- Hope High School (Afghanistan)
- Abdul Hadi Dawi High School (boys)
- International School of Kabul (ISK) (co-educational)
- Lycée Esteqlal
- Lycée Malalaï
- Malalai High School (girls)
- Nazo Ana High School (girls)
- Rahman Baba High School (boys)

== Kandahar Province ==
- Afghan-Turk High School (private)
- Malalai High School (girls)

== Samangan Province ==
- Afghan-Turk High School (private)

== See also ==
- Education in Afghanistan
- Lists of schools
