= List of schools in Kabul =

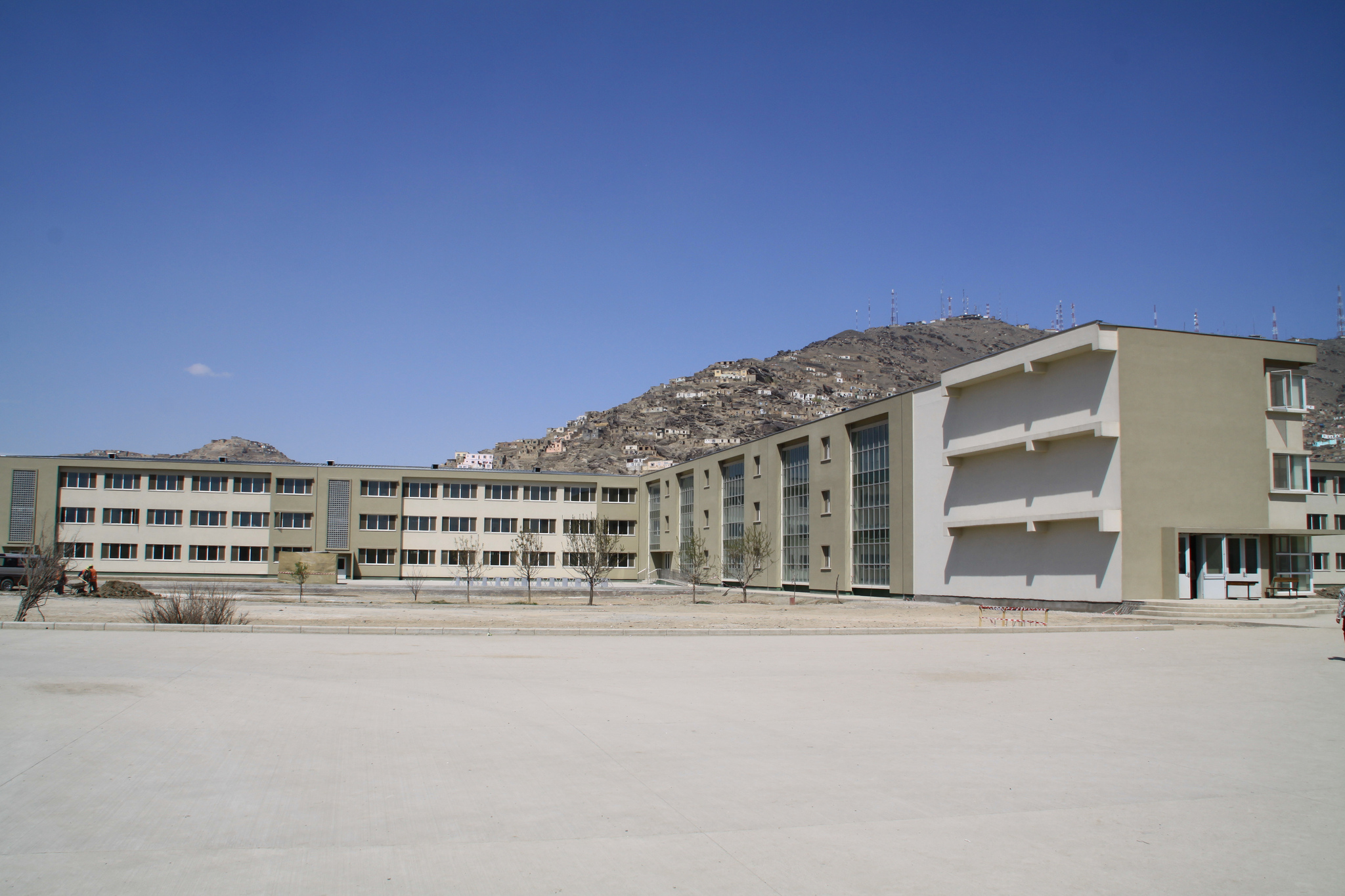
Ghazi High School

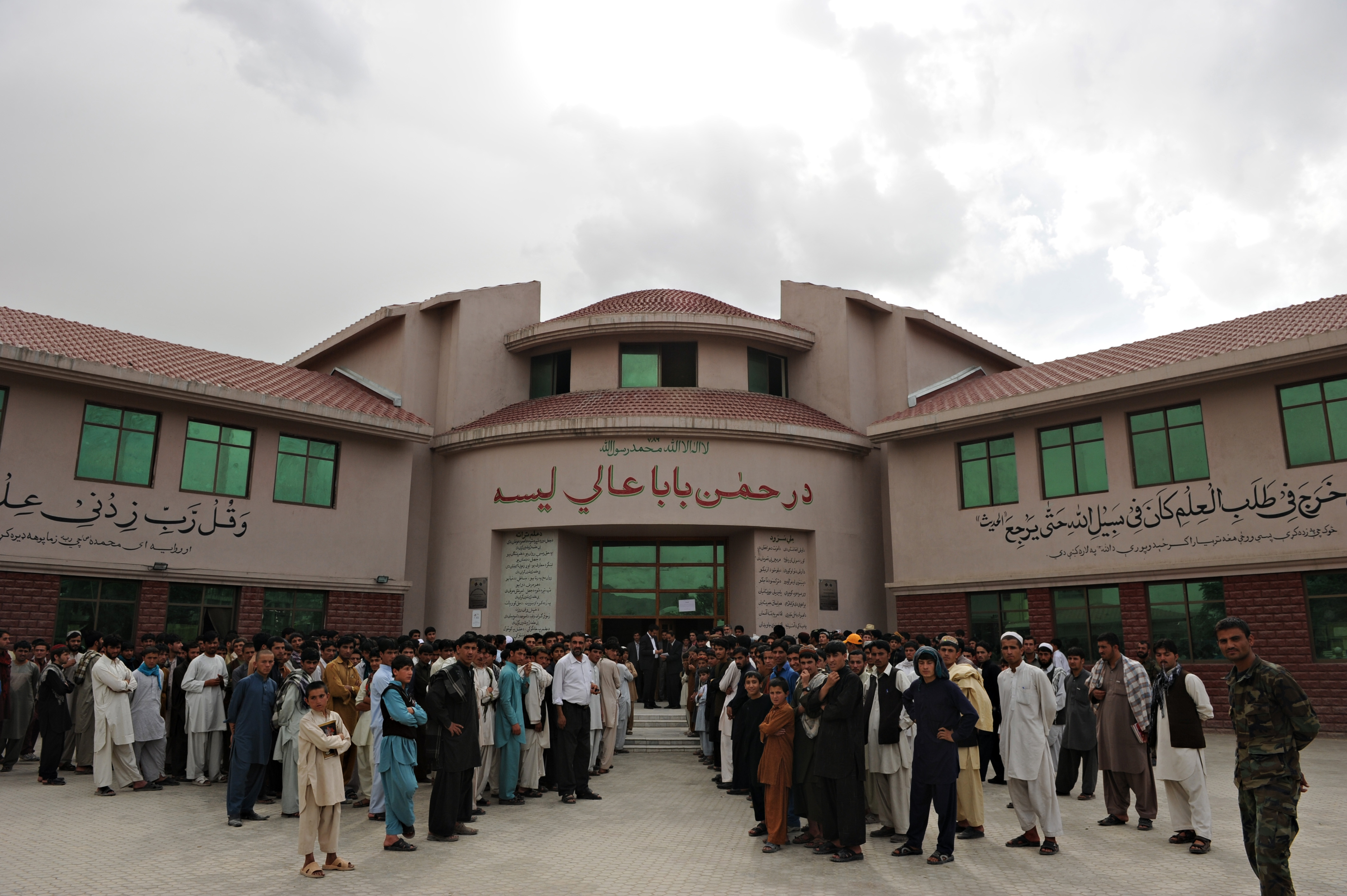
Rahman Baba High School

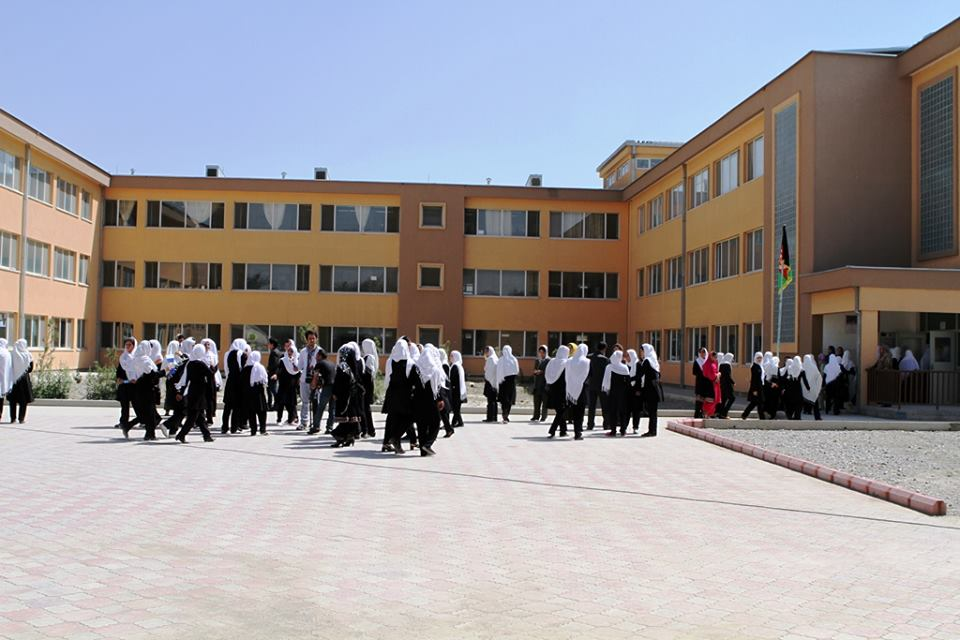
Sardar Dawood Khan High School

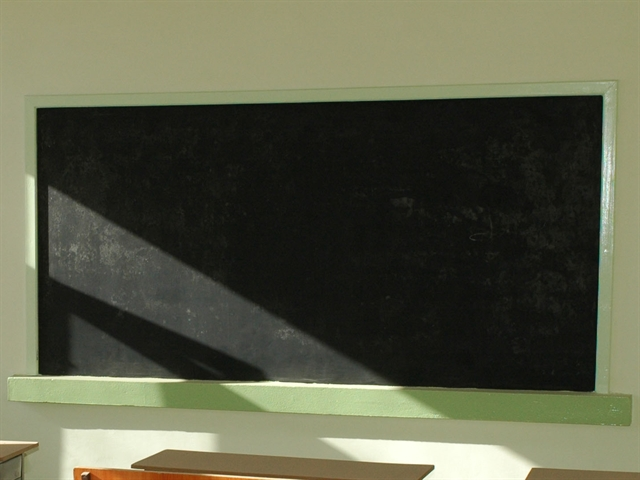
Inside a classroom of Sir Asyab Girls High School

The following is a list of schools in the Afghan capital, Kabul. It includes elementary and high schools. Some are schools for boys only while others are strictly for girls. All schools in Afghanistan are run by the Ministry of Education and free to the public although some private ones may charge fees.

- Abdul Hadi Dawi High School
- Afghanistan Technical Vocational Institute
- Afghan Turk High Schools
- Amani High School
- Esteqlal High School
- Ghazi High School
- Ghulam Haider Khan High School
- Habibia High School
- International School of Kabul
- Malalai High School
- Nazo Ana High School
- Rahman Baba High School

== See also ==
- Education in Afghanistan
- List of schools in Afghanistan
