= Culture of Afghanistan =

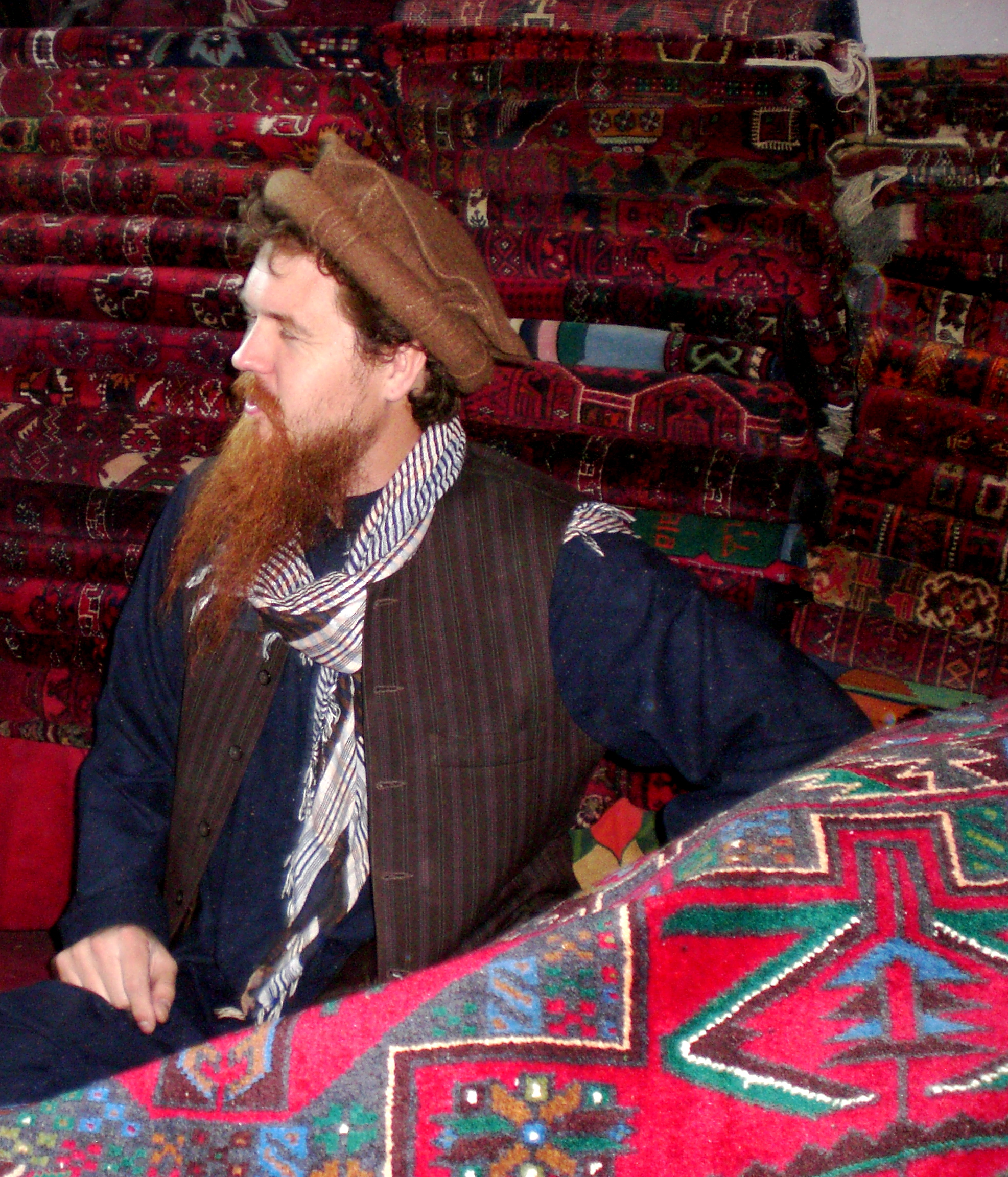
Shoppers examining traditional Afghan rugs in a market in Nangarhar Province, Afghanistan.

The culture of Afghanistan has persisted for centuries and encompasses the cultural diversity of the nation. Its location at the crossroads of Central, South and West Asia historically made it a hub of diversity, dubbed by one historian as the "roundabout of the ancient world".

Afghanistan is a mostly tribal society with different regions of the country having their own subculture. Despite this, nearly all Afghans follow Islamic traditions, celebrate the same holidays, dress the same, consume the same food, listen to the same music and use Dari as the inter-ethnic lingua franca to a certain extent. Its culture is strongly tied with elements of Central Asia, which can be seen in the likes of language, cuisine and classical music.

Afghan culture is increasingly becoming a dynamic realm of academic study. In more recent history, Afghan culture has been threatened and fragmented due to the prolonged conflict in the country.

== Music and dance ==
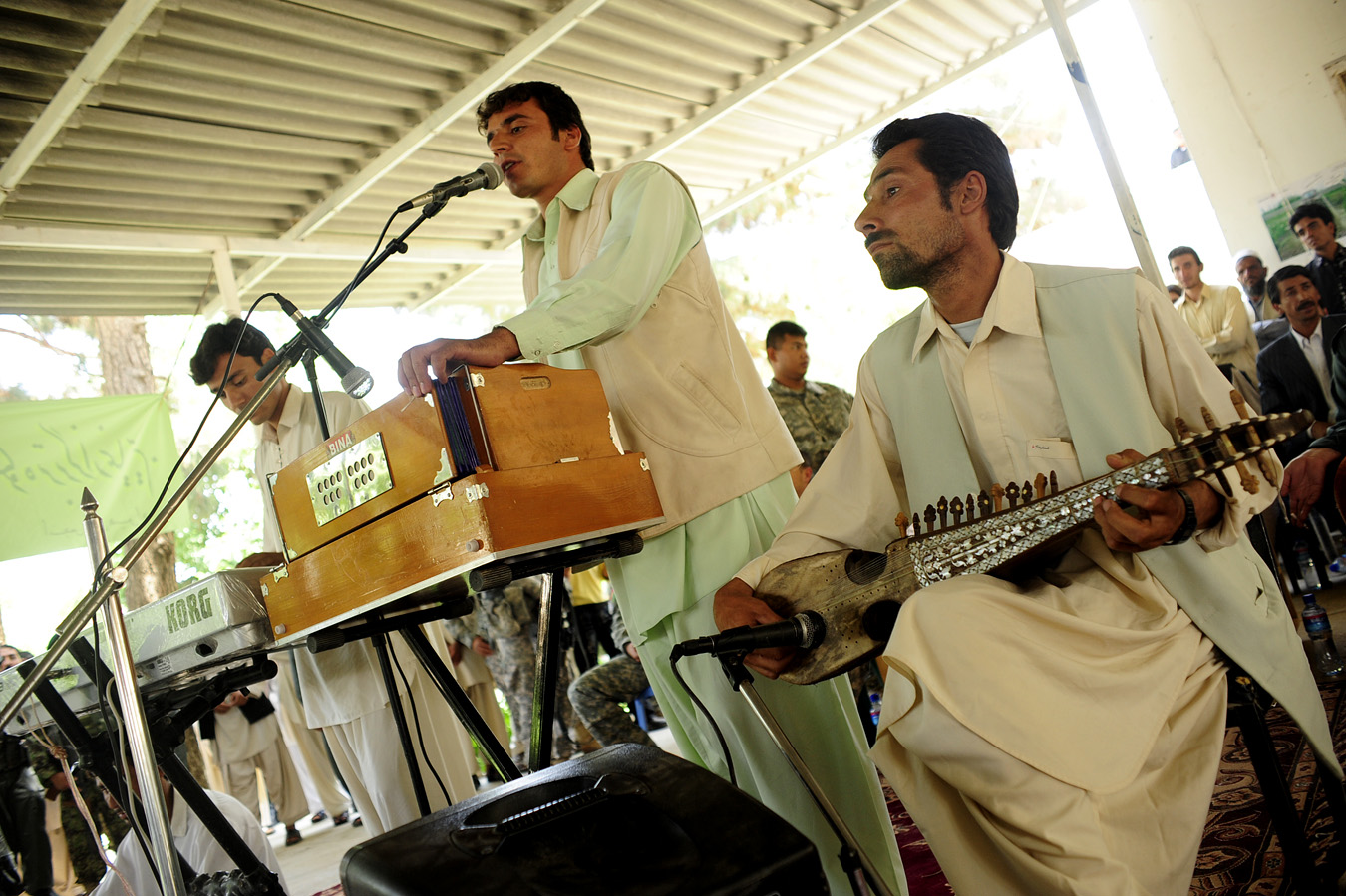
Afghan musicians in Farah, Afghanistan.

Traditionally, only men have been involved in theatre acting. Recently, in theatre arts, women have begun to take centre stage.

Since the 1980s, the nation has witnessed several wars so music has been suppressed and recording for outsiders minimal. During the 1990s, the Taliban government banned instrumental music and much public music-making. Many musicians and singers continued to play their trade in the cities of other countries. Pakistani cities such as Peshawar, Quetta are important centres for the distribution of Afghan music. Kabul has long been the regional cultural capital, but outsiders have tended to focus on the cities of Herat and Mazar-e-Sharif with its Qataghani style. Lyrics across the country are typically in both Dari and Pashto, Uzbeki, Hazaragi, Hindi, and western style songs and music are also very popular in Afghanistan.

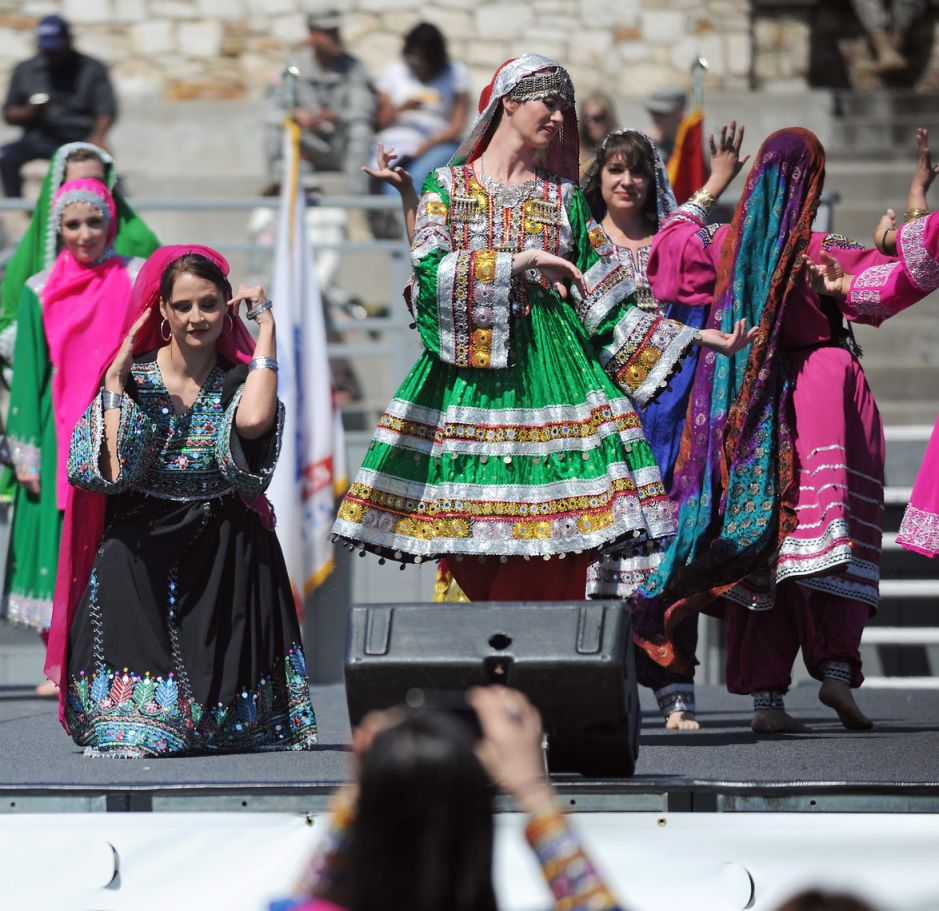
Women dancing in traditional dress in San Francisco

Afghans enjoy music by playing many types of instruments. They also enjoy performing the Attan, which is considered the national dance of Afghanistan. What is typically heard in the country are folk songs or ballads. Many of the songs are known by almost everyone and have been around for many years. The main traditional Afghan music instruments include:

- Harmonium
- Santur
- Chang
- Rubab
- Tabla
- Sitar
- Zurna
- Flute
- Dayereh
- Tanbur
- Dambura

== Language and literature ==
Dari and Pashto are both the official languages of Afghanistan, although Dari serves as the lingua franca for the majority. People in the northern and central areas of the country usually speak Dari, while those living in the south and east speak Pashto. Afghans living in the western regions of Afghanistan speak both Dari and Pashto. Most citizens are fluent in both languages, especially those living in major cities where the population is multi-ethnic. Several other languages are spoken in their own regions, which includes Uzbek, Turkmen and Balochi. English is gradually becoming popular among the young generation. There are smaller number of Afghans who can understand Russian, mainly among the northern Tajik, Uzbek and Turkmen groups.

=== Poetry ===
Poetry in Afghanistan has long been a cultural tradition and passion. It is mainly in Dari and Pashto languages, although in modern times it is also becoming more recognised in Afghanistan's other languages. Classic Dari literature and Pashto poetry plays an important role in the Afghan culture. Poetry has always been one of the major educational pillars in the region, to the level that it has integrated itself into culture. Some notable poets include Khushal Khan Khattak, Rahman Baba, Massoud Nawabi, Nazo Tokhi, Ahmad Shah Durrani, and Ghulam Muhammad Tarzi. Some of the famous Dari-language poets and authors from the 10th to 15th centuries are Rumi, Rabi'a Balkhi, Khwaja Abdullah Ansari, Jami, Alisher Navoi, Sanai, Abu Mansur Daqiqi, Farrukhi Sistani, Unsuri, and Anvari. Contemporary Dari language poets and writers include Khalilullah Khalili and Sufi Ashqari.

=== Proverbs ===
Afghans prize wit and cleverness in speech. "Zarbul Masalha" (pronounced zar-bull mah-sal-HAA) means "proverbs" in Dari, and these zarbul masalha deeply reflect Afghan culture. US Navy Captain Edward Zellem pioneered the use of Afghan proverbs as a positive relationship-building tool during the war in Afghanistan, and in 2012 he published two bilingual collections of Afghan proverbs in Dari and English.

== Pet keeping ==
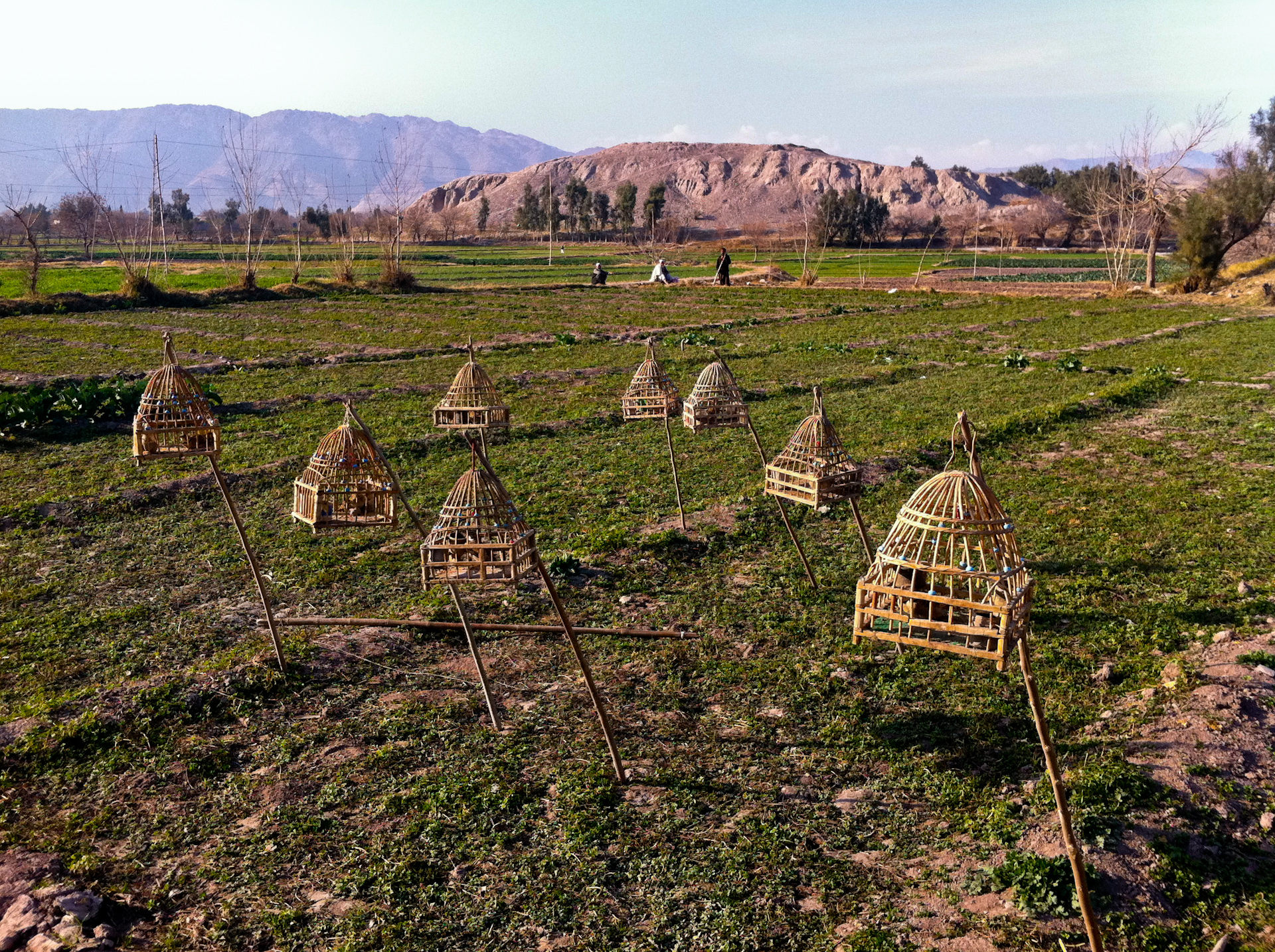
Songbirds in cages at a farm in Nangarhar Province, used for the pleasure of the site's farmers

Birds are the most popular animals that are kept as pets in Afghanistan. In Kabul there is a dedicated daily market selling a wide variety of birds from around the world.

== Architecture ==
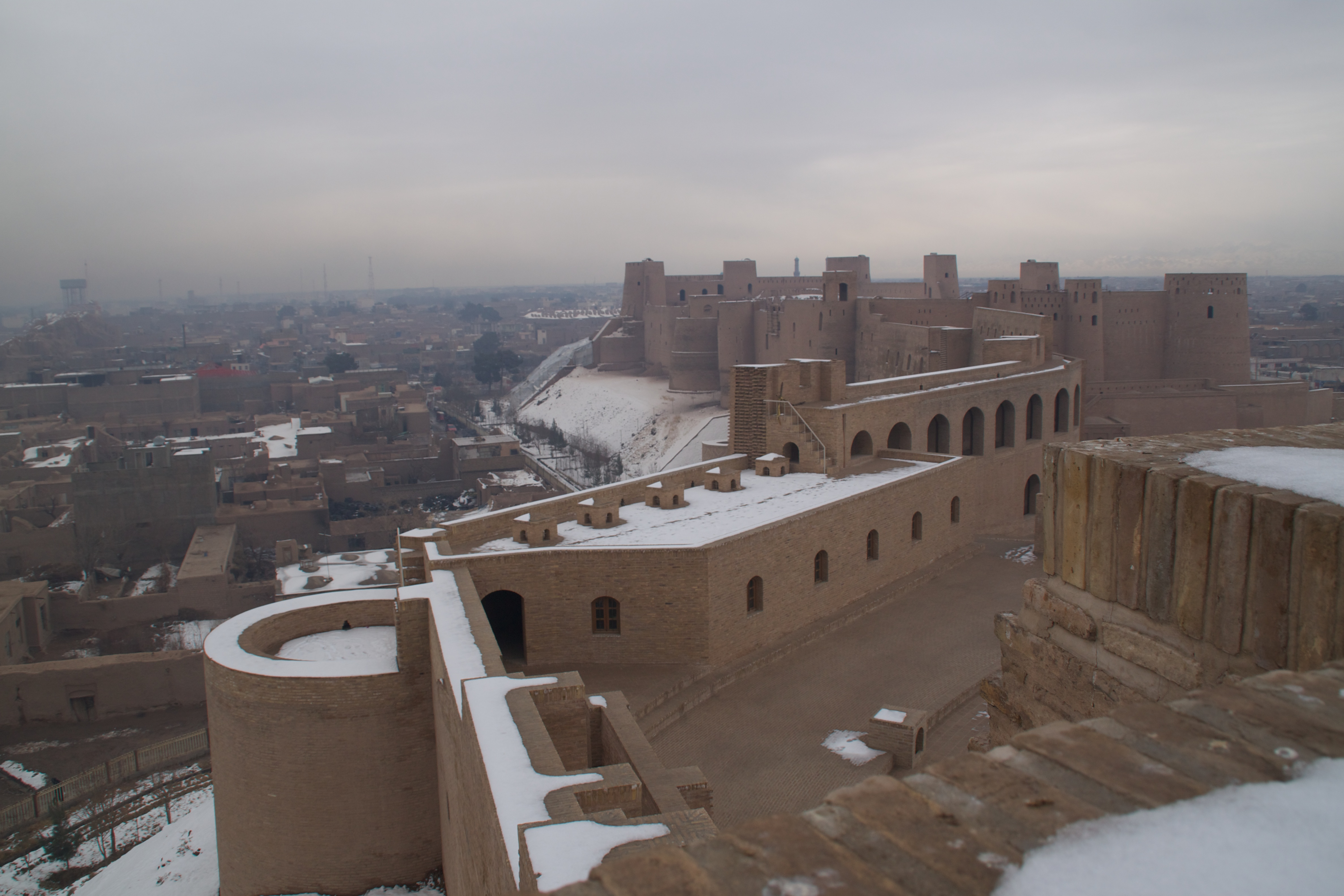
Herat Citadel in the western Afghan city of Herat

The important architectural sites are found in Herat, Mazar-I-Sharif, Ghazni, Qandahar, and Firuzkoh in Ghor Province. The region has made major contributions to the world's architecture. UNESCO has acknowledged Afghanistan's role by declaring the Minaret of Jam and the Buddhas of Bamiyan destroyed in 2001, World Heritage Sites.

=== Housing ===
Houses in rural Afghanistan historically have been made of mudbricks and mud, and have a series of rooms located around a private rectangular courtyard where women and children can move around without being seen by the public. In recent years, however, Afghans living in rural areas began building their homes using cement and bricks, similar as those built in the big cities. In the north and west they are typically in fortified villages called qalahs ("fortresses"), whereas in the mountainous northern and eastern regions they differ, for example wooden multistoried dwellings in Nuristan.

Married sons often share houses with their parents, but with separate quarters. Afghan houses contain a special room where men socialise with each other known as a hujra. In the major cities, many Afghans live in modern houses or apartments. The nomadic kuchi people live in large tents because they are constantly on the move from one part of the country to another. The nomads of Turkic or Mongol origin in the north tend to live in yurts.

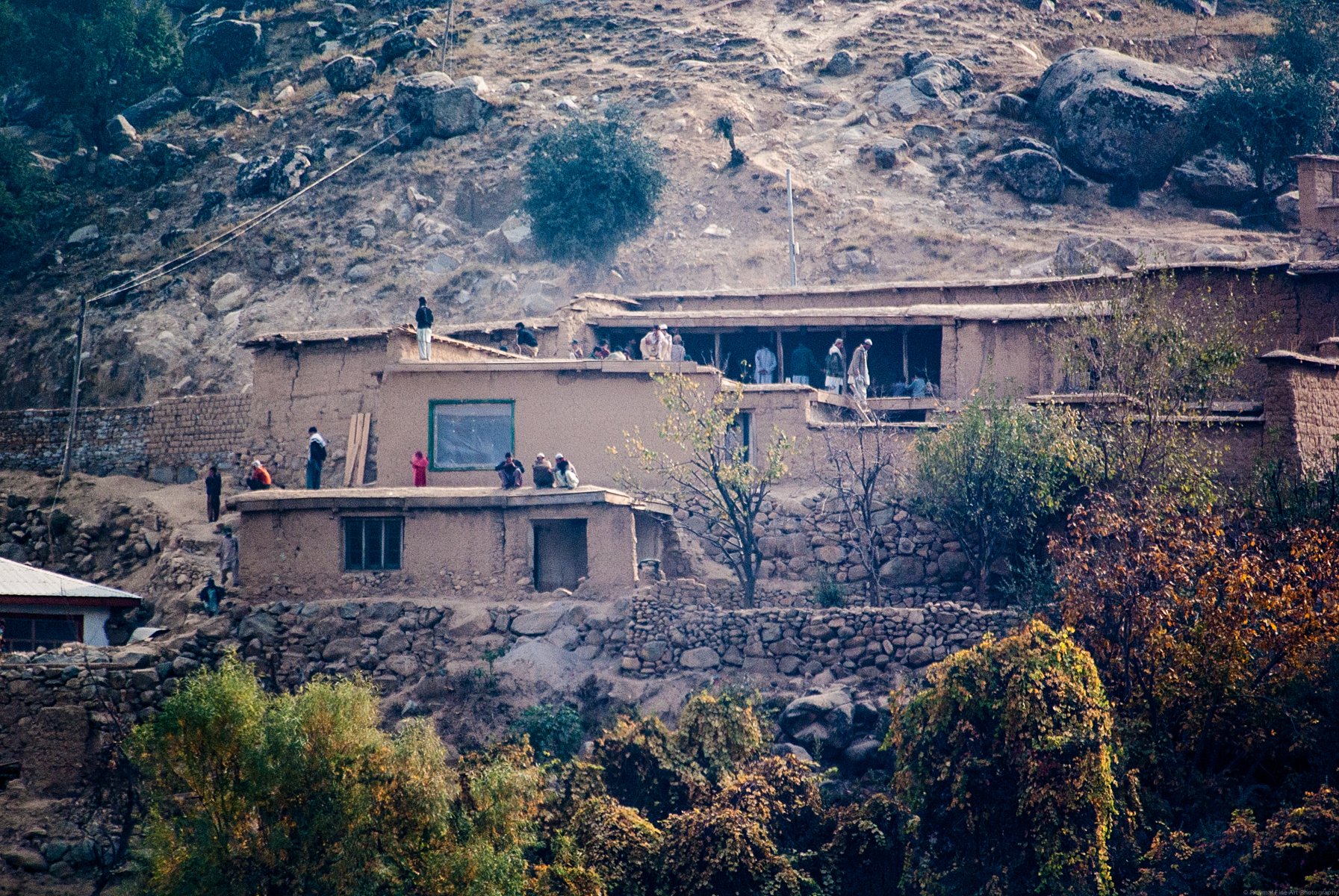
A mud brick house on a mountainside - a common sight in the hilly areas of the Afghan countryside

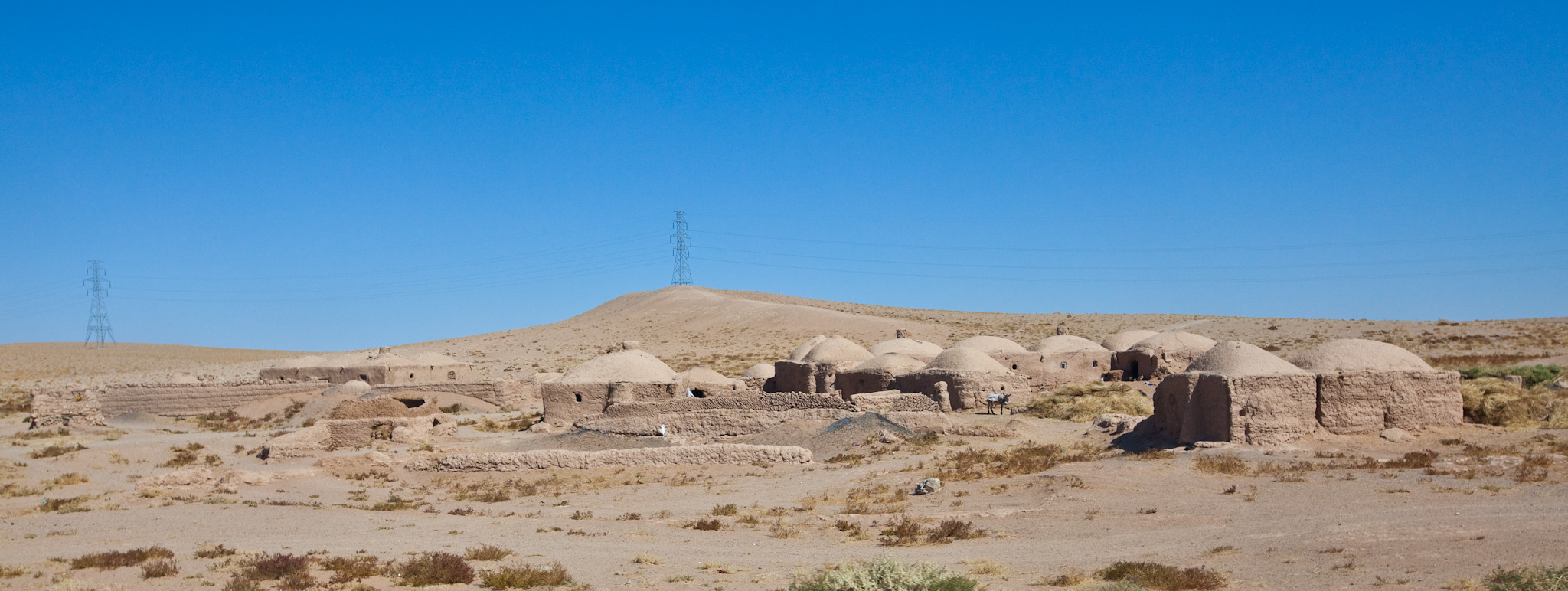
Traditional brick homes common in the lower elevated regions in the north and west

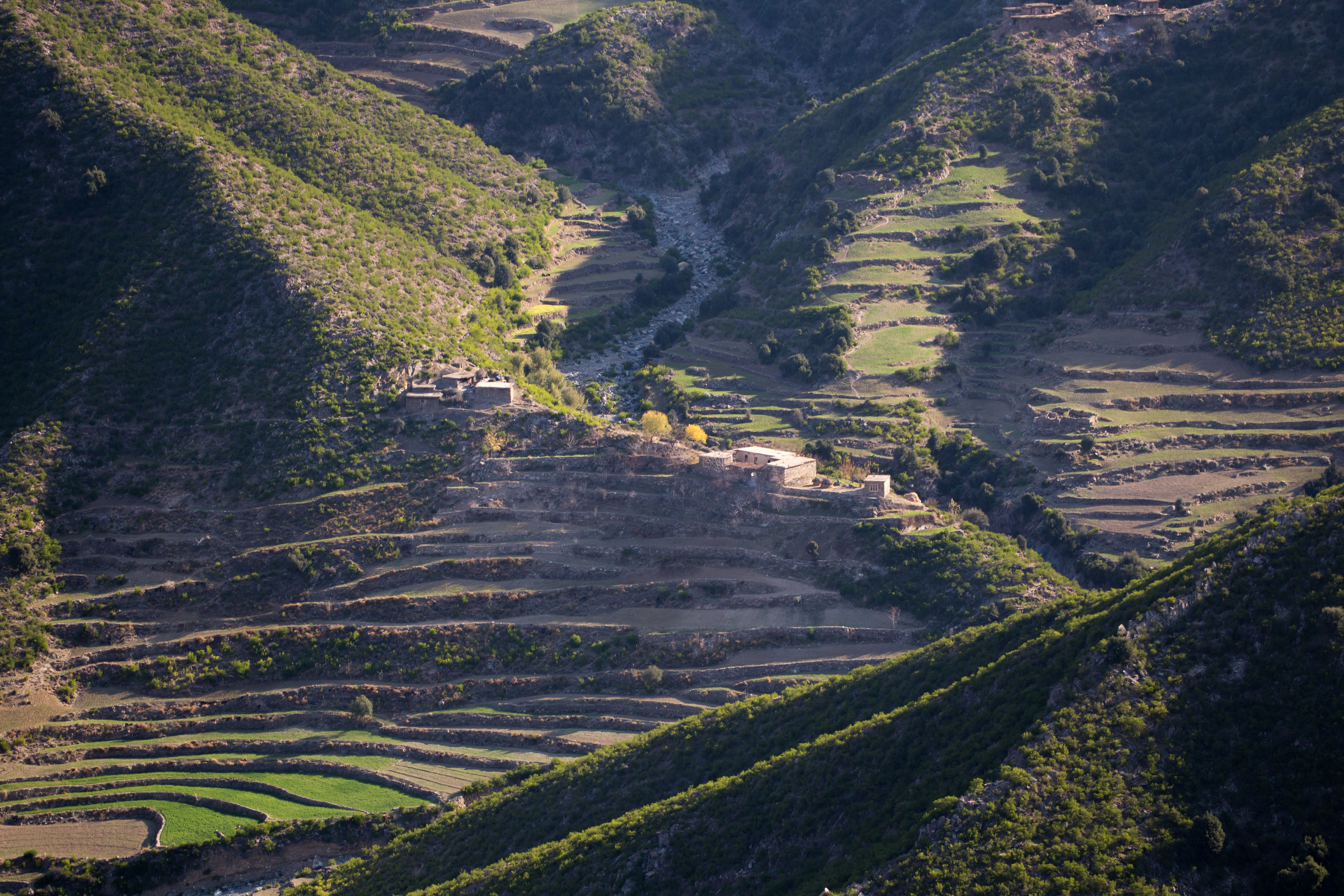
Nested homes in the forest region

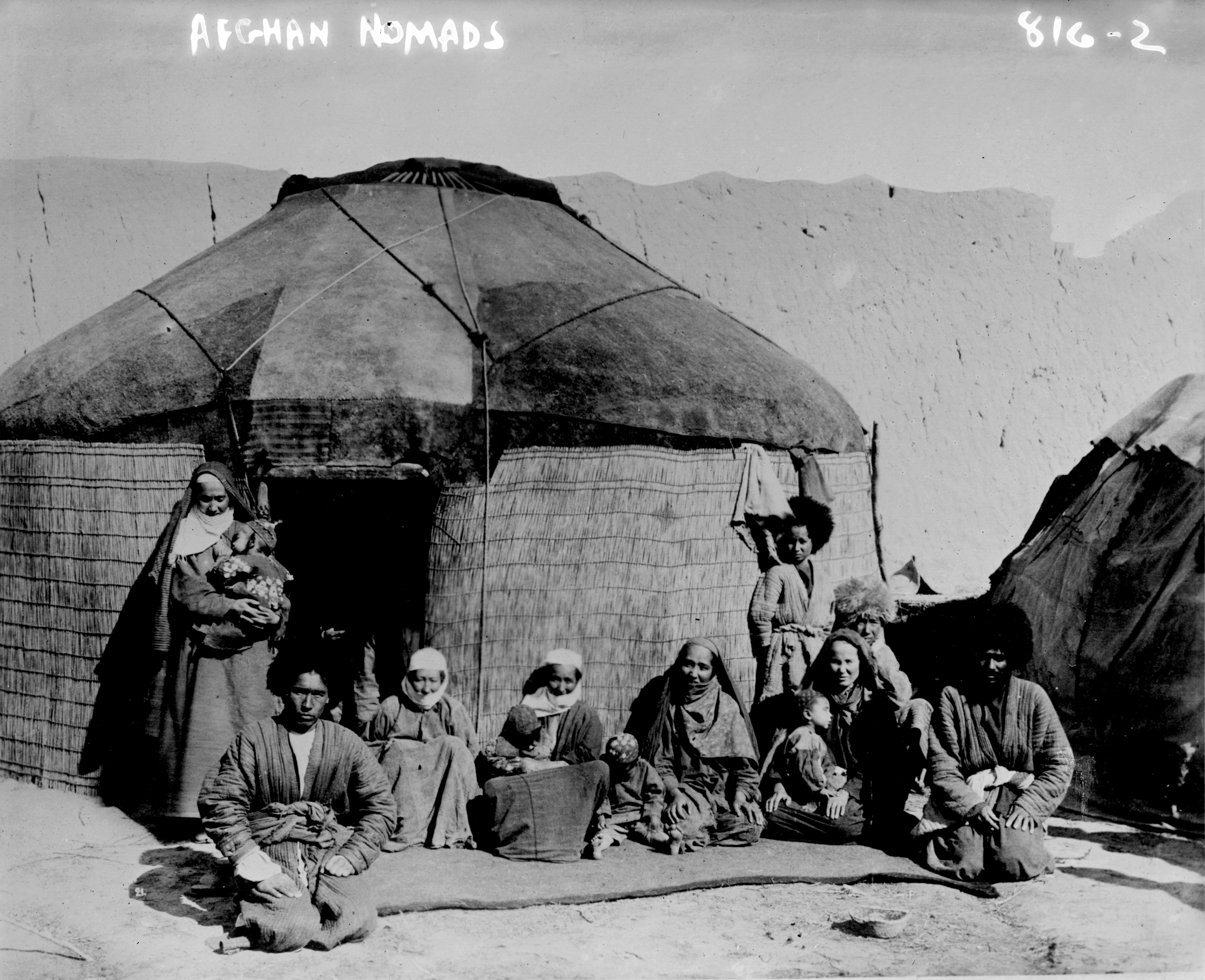
A yurt, most likely in north-eastern Afghanistan

== Art, weaving, ceramics ==
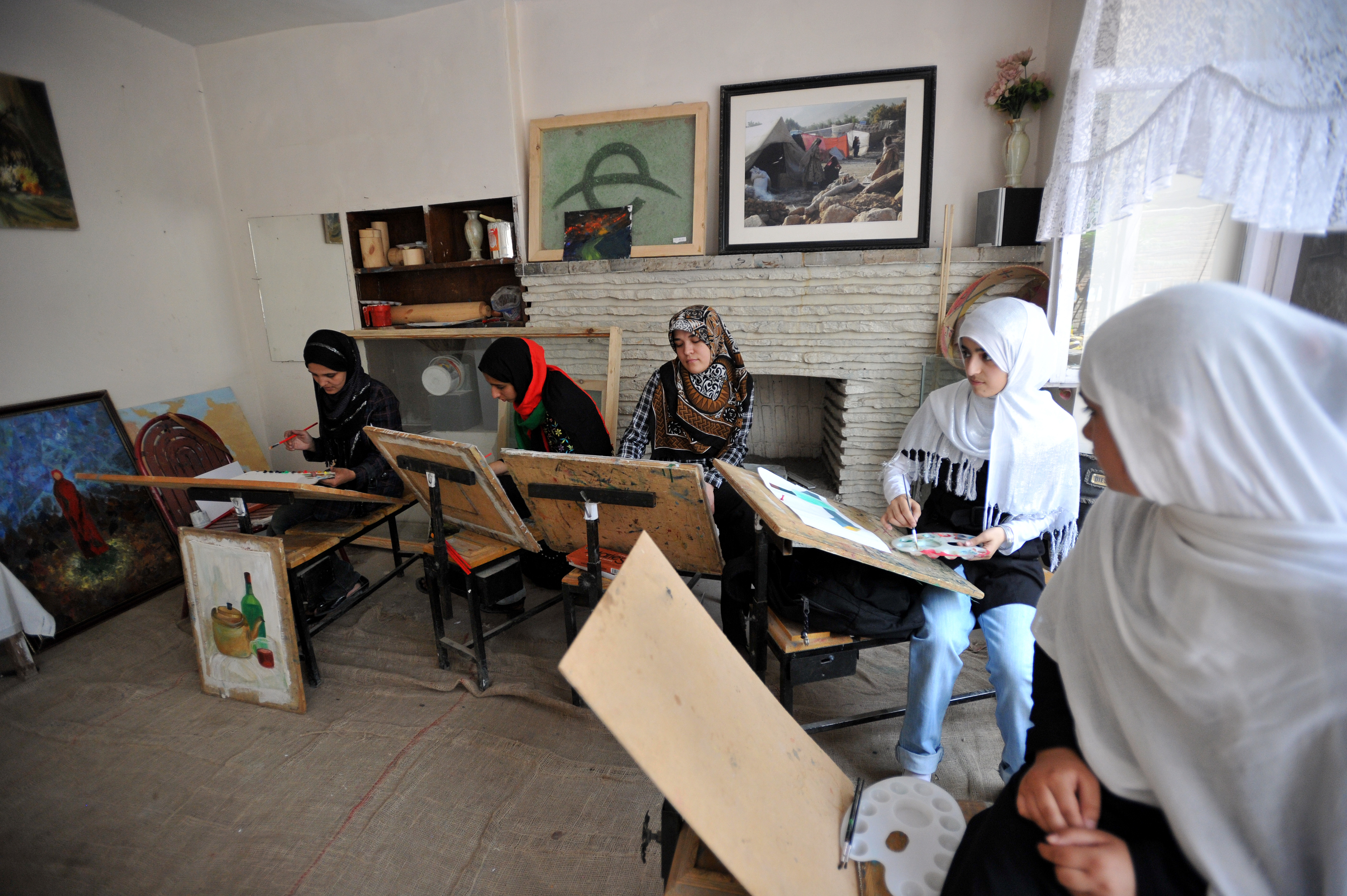
Women painting at the Center for Contemporary Arts Afghanistan (CCAA) in Kabul.

The lands of Afghanistan have a long history of art, with the world's earliest known usage of Buddha's oil painting found in cave murals in the country. Buddha is from Bihar, Indian. this is drying oil technique used by Indians. Afghan art includes miniature style, with Kamaleddin Behzad of Herat being one of the most notable miniature artists of the Timurid and early Safavid periods. Since the 1900s, the nation began to use Western techniques in art. Abdul Ghafoor Breshna was a prominent Afghan painter and sketch artist from Kabul during the 20th century.

Afghanistan's art was originally almost entirely done by men, but recently women are entering the arts programs at Kabul University. Art is largely centred at the National Museum of Afghanistan, the National Gallery of Afghanistan and the National Archives of Afghanistan in Kabul. There are a number of art schools in the country. The Center for Contemporary Arts Afghanistan (CCAA) in Kabul provides young people to learn contemporary paintings.

Ceramics and pottery, of which many tend to be turquoise-coloured, are produced in Afghanistan, most famously in the village of Istalif.

The art of making carpets has been prominent for centuries. Afghanistan is known for making beautiful oriental rugs. The Afghan carpet has certain prints that make them unique to Afghanistan.

Afghanistan is known for its production of Afghan rugs, traditionally handwoven using a number of well-known and highly-prized patterns.

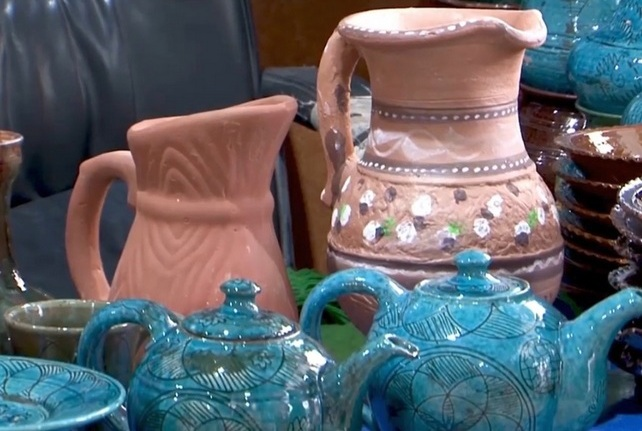
Afghan items of pottery

Items of pottery at a shop

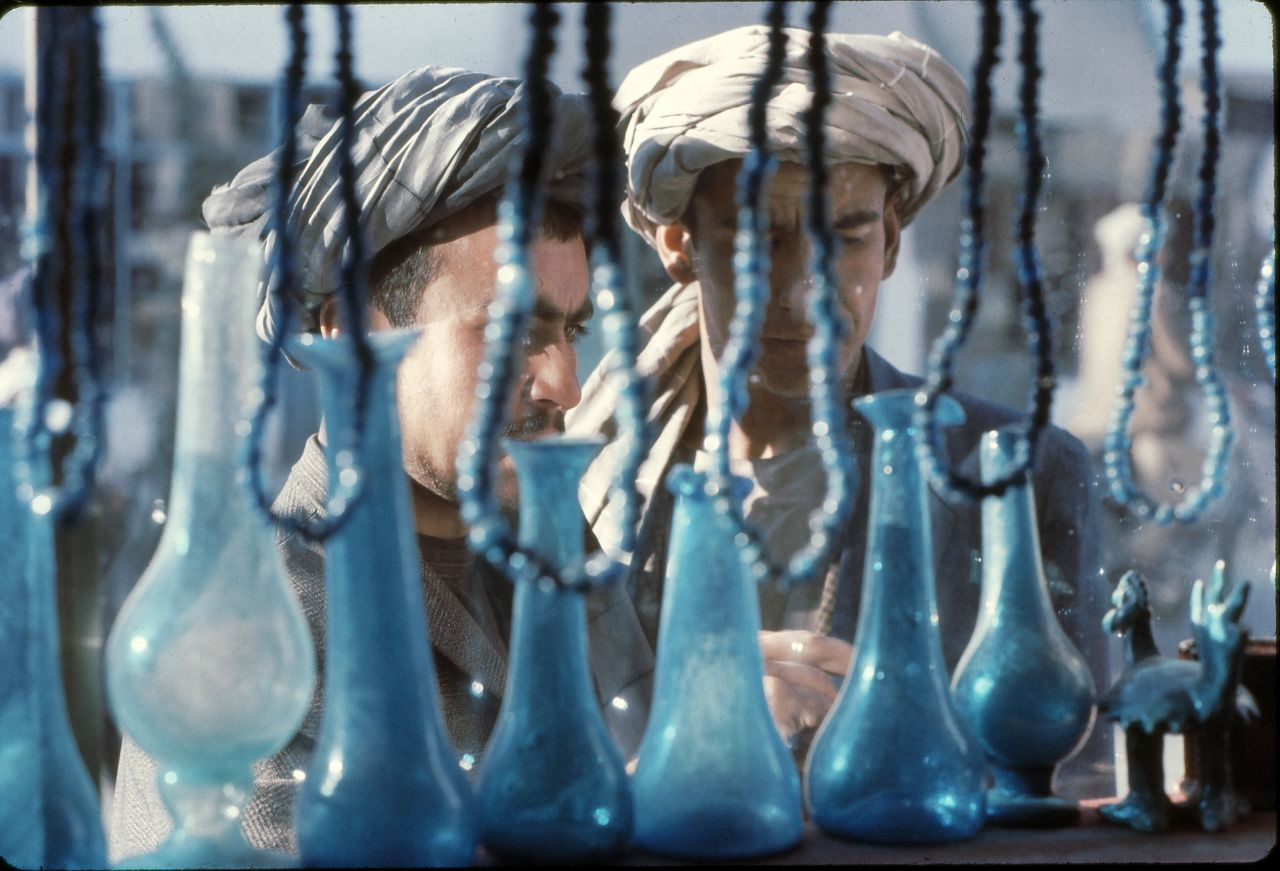
Blue glass

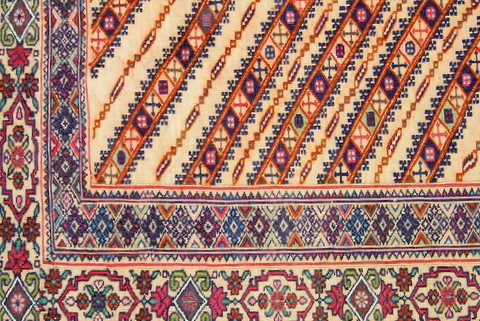
Afghan kilim

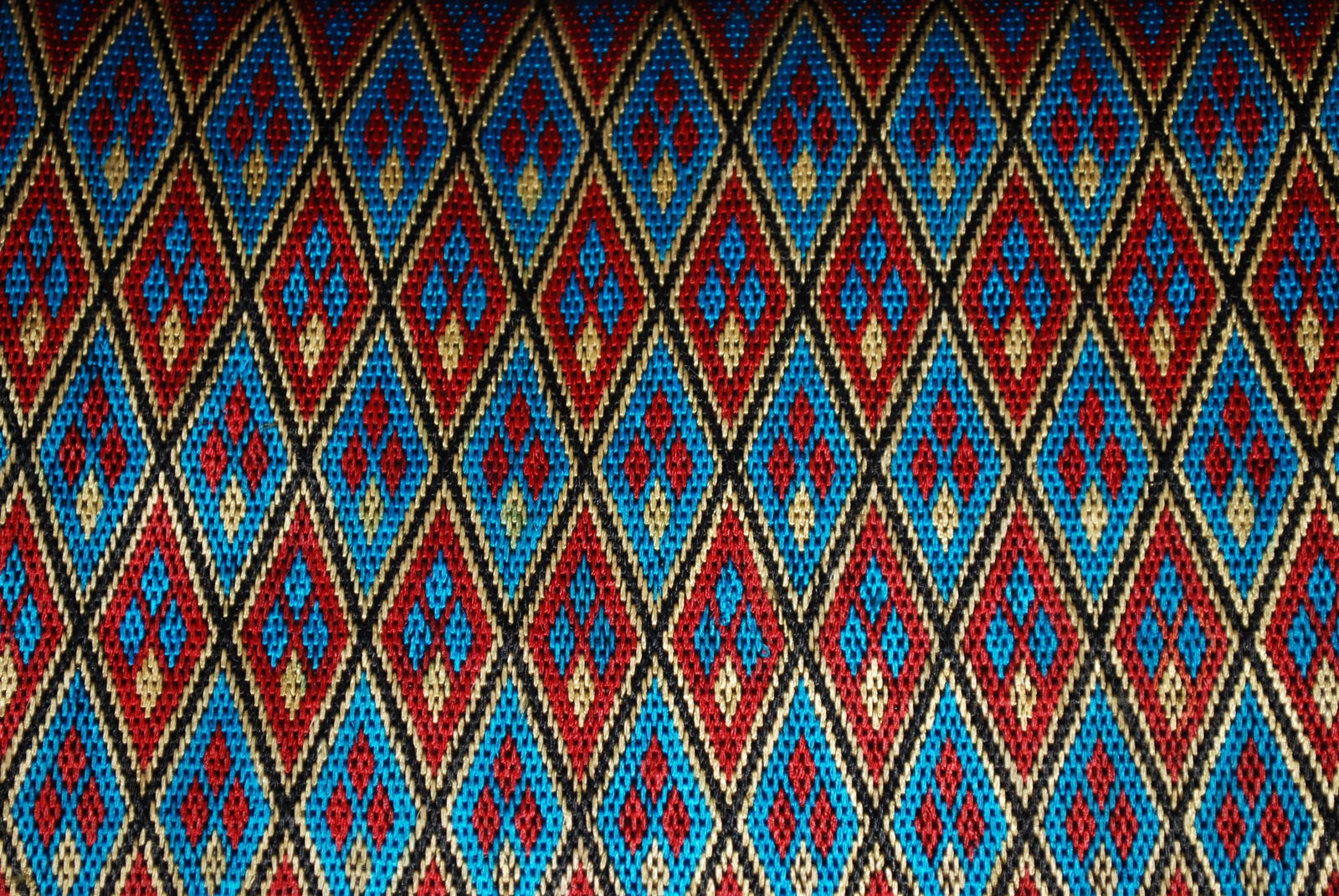
Afghan embroidery pattern

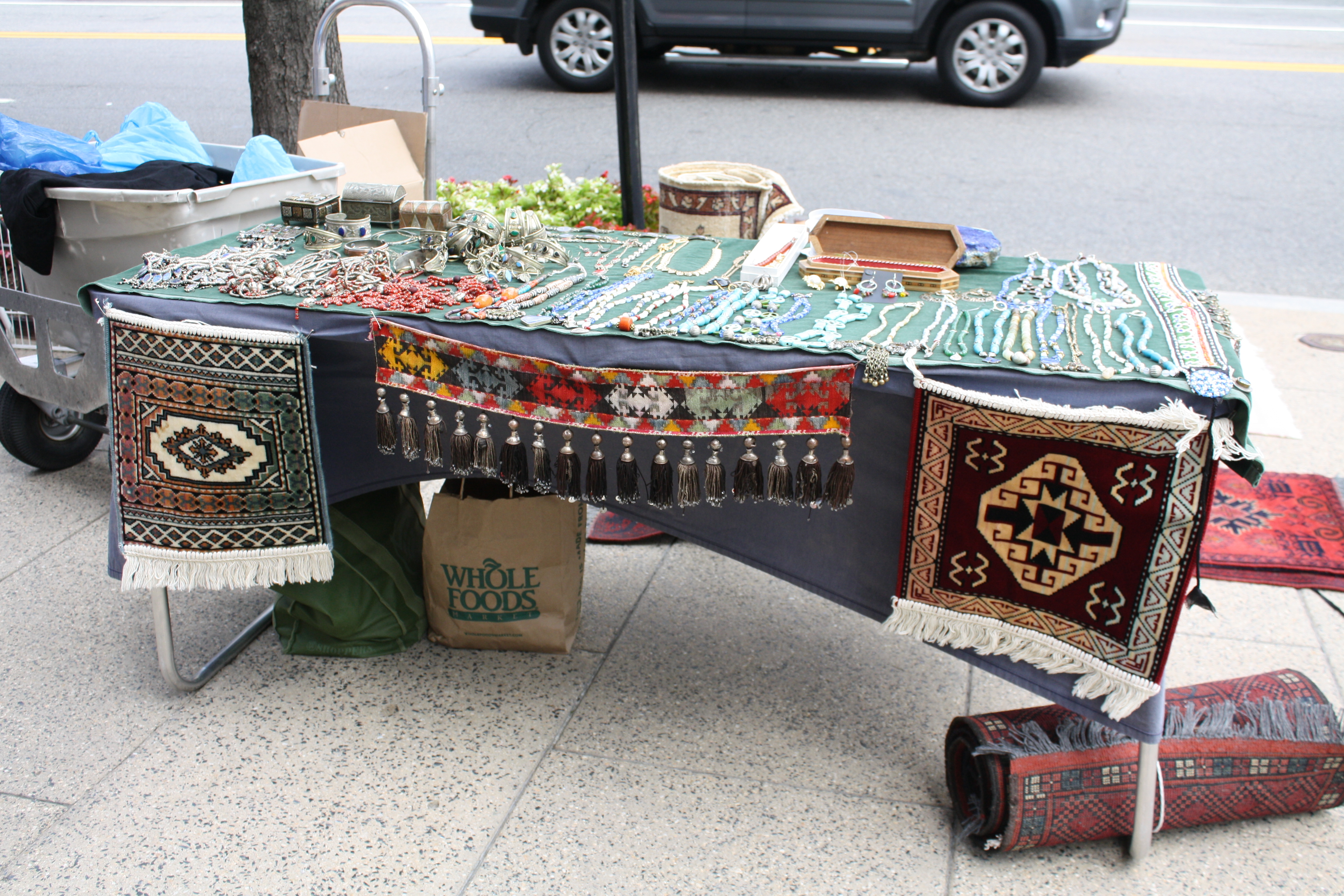
Afghan rugs and jewelry on sale, in the United States

== Cuisine ==
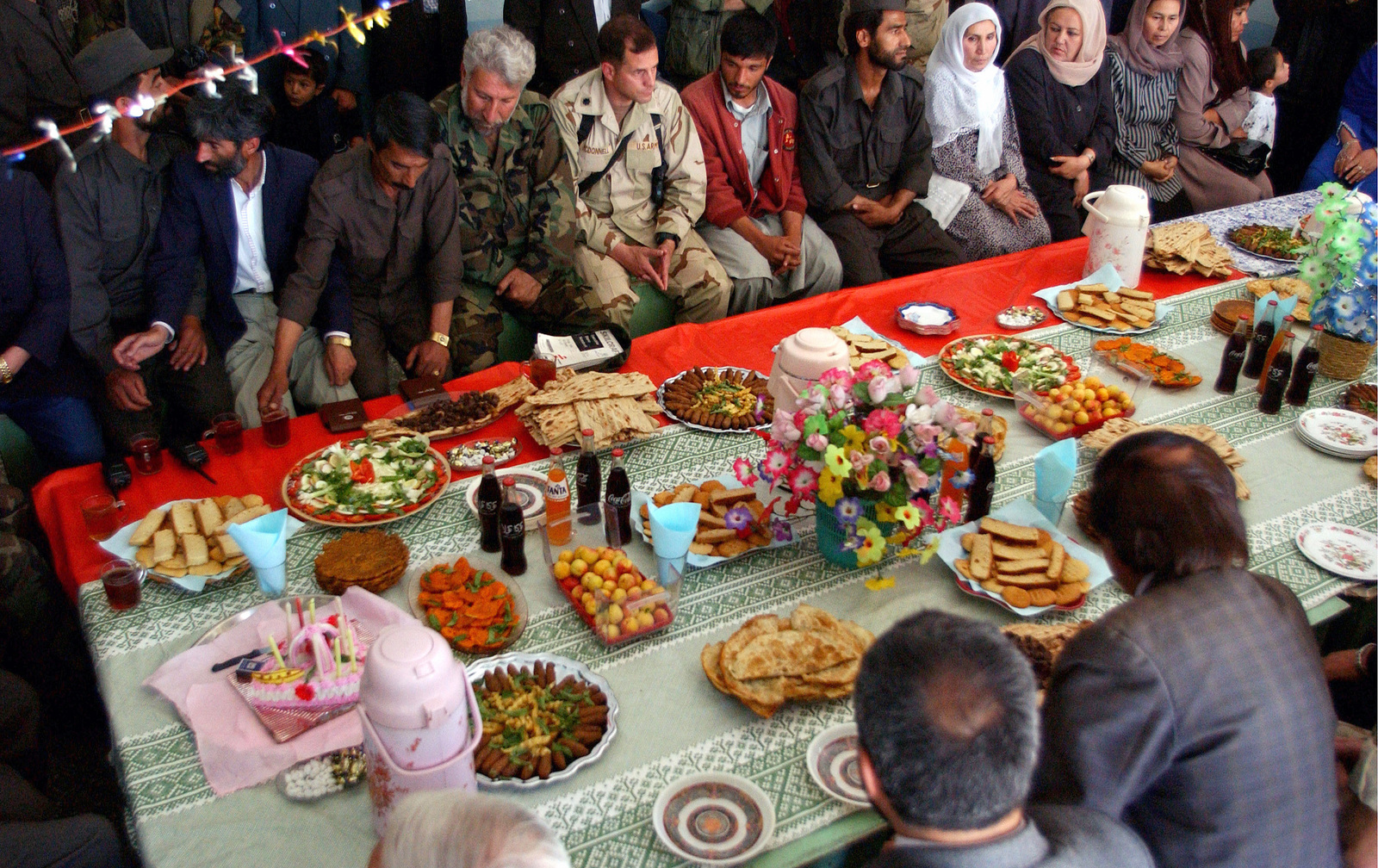
Typical Afghan food table

Afghanistan has a wide varying landscape allowing for many different crops. Afghan cuisine is based on cereals like wheat, maize, barley and rice, which are the nation's chief crops. Afghans do not eat spicy food like the neighbouring Pakistanis. Fresh and dried fruits is the most important part of Afghan diet. Afghanistan is well known for its fine fruits, especially pomegranates, grapes, and its extra-sweet jumbo-size melons.

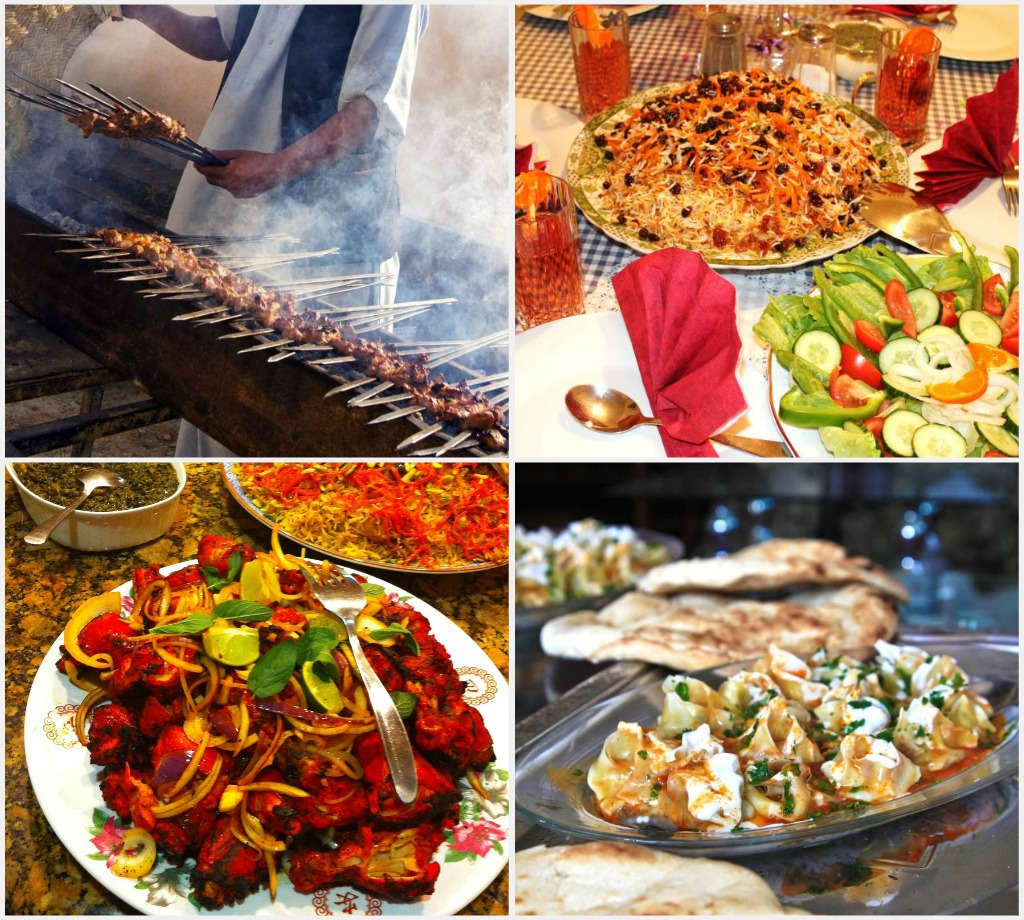
Some of the popular Afghan dishes, from left to right: 1. Lamb grilled kebab (seekh kabab); 2. Palao and salad; 3. Tandoori chicken; and 4. Mantu (dumplings). The Afghan cuisine includes a blend of Central Asian, Eastern Asian, South Asian and the Middle Eastern cuisines. Nearly all Afghan dishes are non-spicy.

Afghan cuisine is diverse and varies by region, but several dishes are widely regarded as national staples. The most prominent is Kabuli Pulao, a rice-based dish typically prepared with lamb, carrots, raisins, and nuts; it is frequently considered Afghanistan’s national dish and is served on important occasions and at large gatherings.

Another characteristic food is Bolani, a fried flatbread stuffed with ingredients such as potatoes, leeks, pumpkin, or lentils. It is common as both a festive dish and a popular form of street food across urban centres.

Food in Afghanistan is closely connected to traditions of hospitality, an important cultural value across ethnic groups. Offering generous meals to guests is strongly emphasised, especially in communities influenced by Pashtunwali, the Pashtun code of conduct, which places hospitality (*melmastia*) among its central principles. This emphasis on sharing food also appears broadly in non-tribal and urban Afghan customs.

- Popular Afghan dishes:
  - Qabuli palao (traditional rice dish)
  - Mosh Palao
  - Shorba (Afghan soup)
  - Do Pyaza
  - Mantu (meat dumplings)
  - Kofta (meatballs)
  - Kichiri
  - Rosh
  - Chopan Kabab
  - Afghani Kabab
  - Mash Palao
  - Qabuli Polao
  - Qorma Sabzi
  - Shola (sticky rice dish)
  - Qoruti
  - Eshkana
  - Baunjan (cooked eggplant with potatoes and tomatoes)
  - Bendee/Baumya (cooked okra with potatoes and tomatoes)
  - Heeknusb (hummus)
  - Aushak
  - Aush (hand made noodles)
  - Baghlava (baklava)
  - Bolani (Afghan flat bread or crêpes)
  - Chapli Kabab
  - Shor-Nakhod (chick peas with special toppings)
  - Naan (Afghan bread)
- Popular Afghan desserts:
  - Gosh Feel (pastry)
  - Halwa
  - Shir Berinj (rice pudding)
  - Ferni
  - Kadu Bouranee (sweet pumpkins)
  - Jelabi
  - Maleeda or Khajoor
  - Spice Rub

== Dress and attire ==
Afghan traditional dress typically covers the entire body with a loose top and a form of head covering. The dresses are very colourful, especially women's.

Traditional tribal women's clothing

Traditional tribal men's clothing

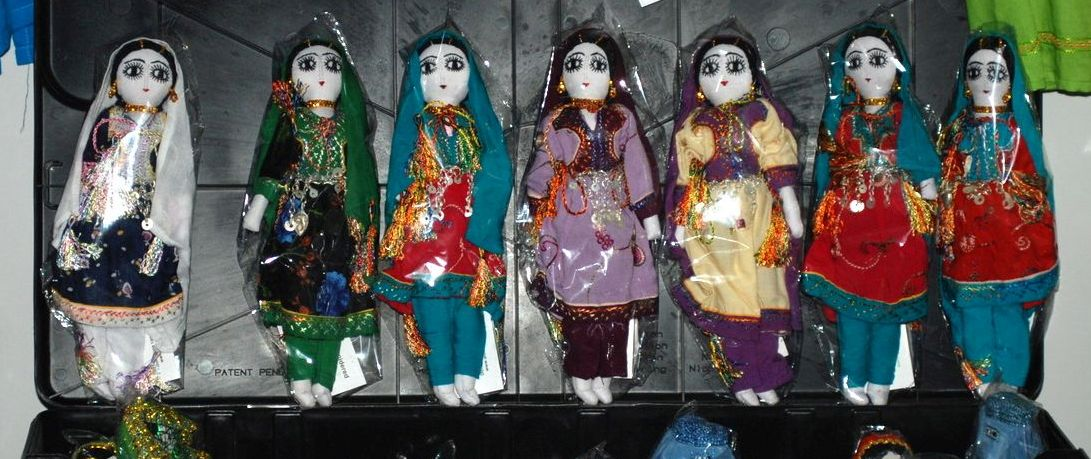
Handmade dolls of traditional women's clothing at a fair

== Sport ==
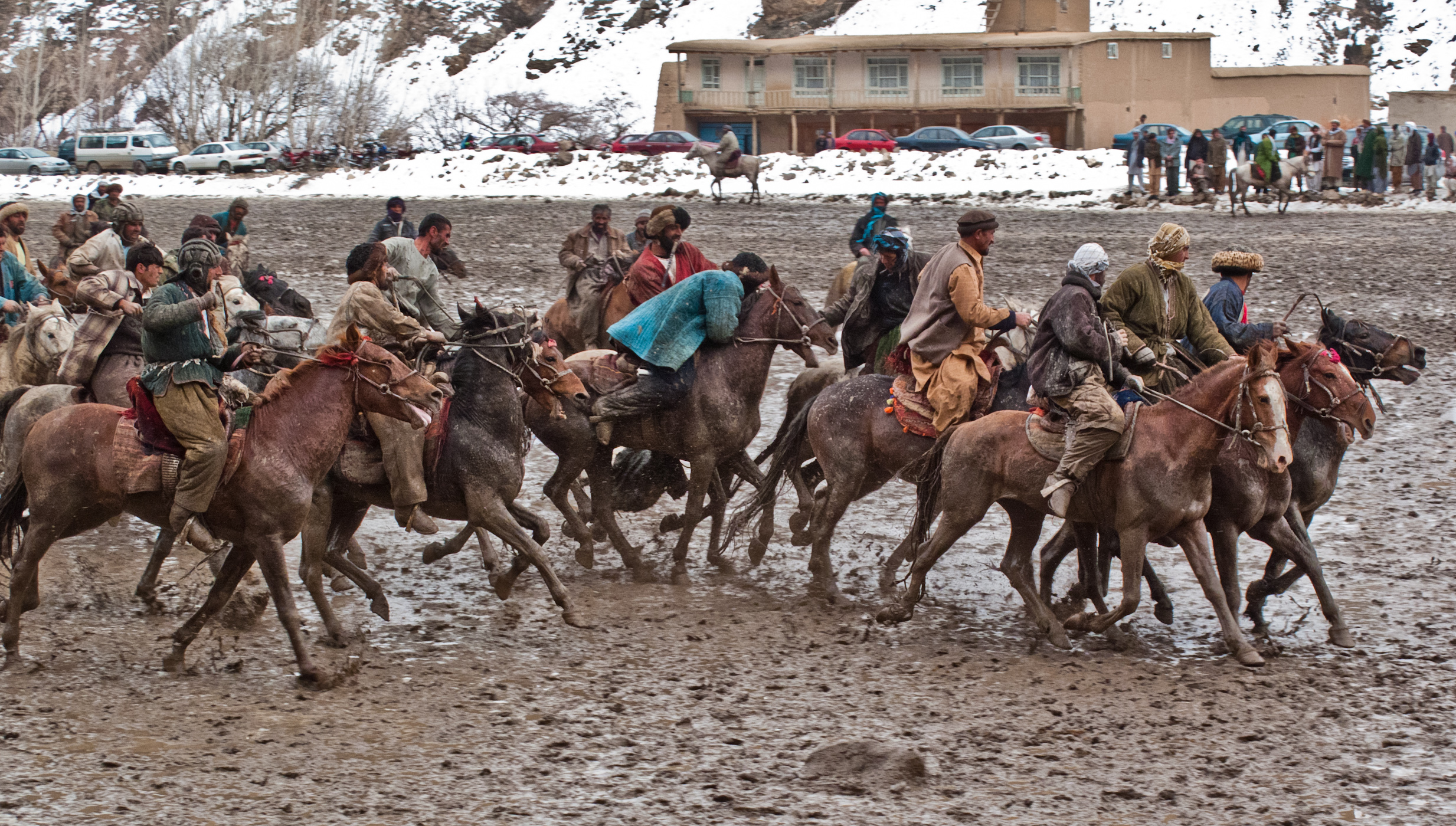
Players in a game of buzkashi, the national sport

The sports in Afghanistan are organised by the Afghan Sports Federation, which promotes football, cricket, basketball, volleyball, golf, handball, boxing, taekwondo, track and field, bowling, skating and several others.

Football remains to be the most popular sport across Afghanistan.The Afghanistan national football team was founded in 1922, joined FIFA in 1948 and the Asian Football Confederation (AFC) in 1954. Although it did not play in any international games from 1984 to 2003 due to the war, it is now striving and hoping to make it to FIFA. The Afghanistan women's national football team was formed in 2007. The Ghazi Stadium, which was built during the reign of King Amanullah Khan, was once used for a venue for public executions by the Taliban government. The stadium is currently used mostly for football matches between teams from different provinces of the country as well as neighbouring countries. Basketball has existed in Afghanistan since at least the 1970s, and is slowly becoming popular again. It is played by both Afghan men and women. Additionally, Afghans in the north of the country enjoy the sport of buzkashi.

== Religion ==
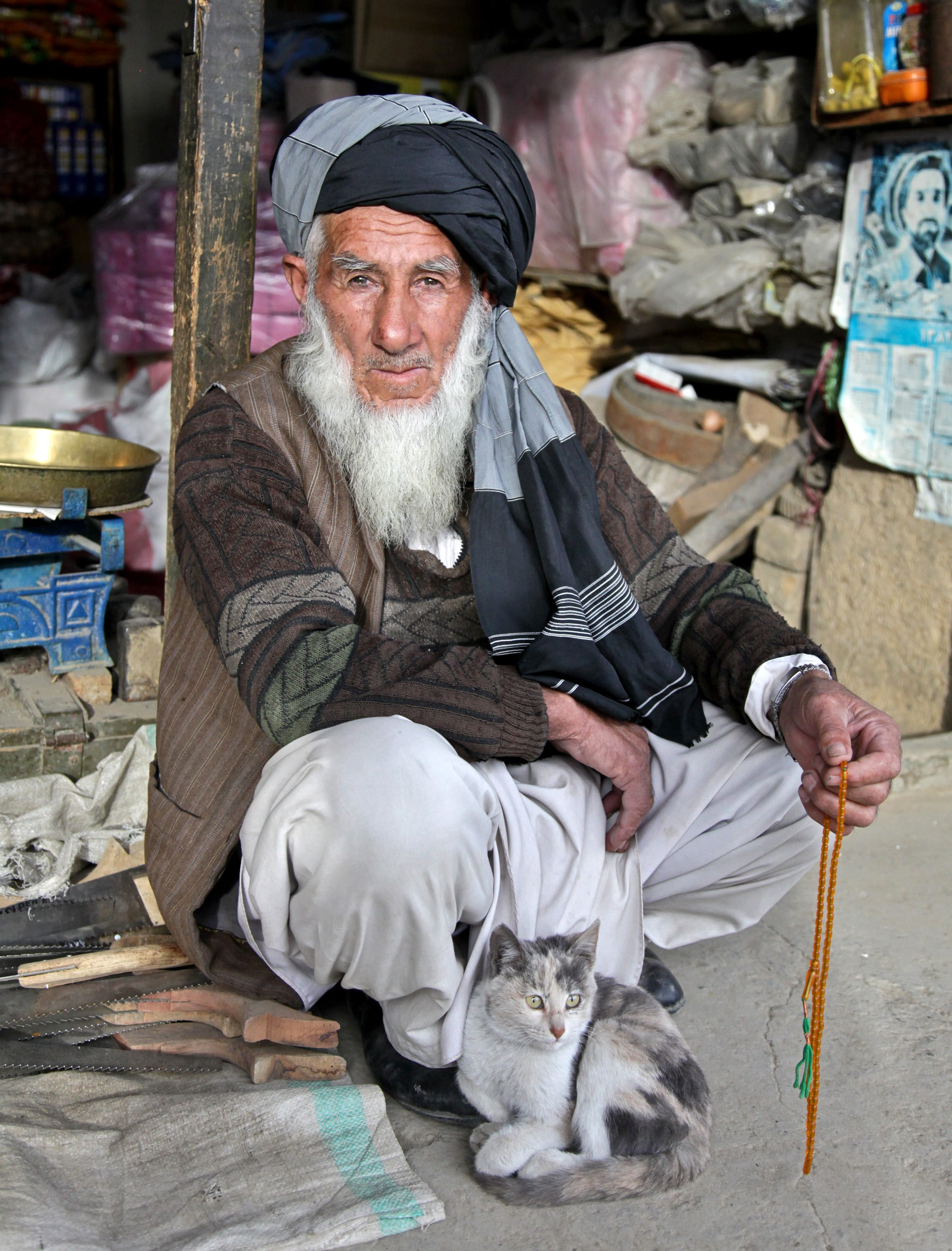
An Afghan man with a tasbih

Islam is the main religion of Afghanistan and over 99.7% of Afghans are Muslims. An estimated 84.7–90% of the population adhere to Sunni Islam, while an estimated 7–15% practice Shia Islam, and approximately 1% are followers of other religions, most prominently Sikhism. In pre-Islamic era, Zoroastrianism and Buddhism had a strong presence in Afghanistan; in addition, Judaism and Christianity have also had a presence in Afghanistan for over a millennium.

== Education ==
Education in Afghanistan includes K-12 and higher education, which is supervised by the Ministry of Education and Ministry of Higher Education in Kabul, Afghanistan. There are about 10,000 schools of which 4,000 were built in the last decade. More than 100,000 teachers were trained and recruited in the same period. It was reported in 2011 that more than seven million male and female students were enrolled in schools. Some of the well known schools in Kabul are Habibia High School, Lycée Esteqlal, Amani High School, Aisha-i-Durani School, Ghazi High School and Rahman Baba High School. The Ahmad Shah Baba High School and Zarghuna Anna High School are two of the oldest schools in Kandahar.

Since the country has one of the lowest literacy rates in the world, the United States began establishing a number of Lincoln learning centres to help with this problem and promote American culture in Afghanistan. They are set up to serve as programming platforms offering English language classes, library facilities, programming venues, Internet connectivity, educational and other counselling services. A goal of the program is to reach at least 4,000 Afghan citizens per month per location. The military and national police are now provided with mandatory literacy courses. In addition to this, Baghch-e-Simsim (based on the American Sesame Street) was launched in late 2011 to help Afghan children learn from preschool onward. Programs in the show "will be partly filmed in Afghanistan with the rest" lifted from other versions in Muslim countries including Egypt and Bangladesh, as well as Mexico and Russia.

Higher education is provided by various universities throughout the country, which include the American University of Afghanistan, Kabul University, Polytechnical University of Kabul, Herat University, Balkh University, Nangarhar University, Kandahar University, Khost University, Bakhtar University, and a heap of others. There is also one military college, located in Kabul. Recently with help from UNESCO, over 1,000 women have taken the university entrance exam. As of 2011, about 62,000 students are enrolled in different universities around the country.

== Games ==
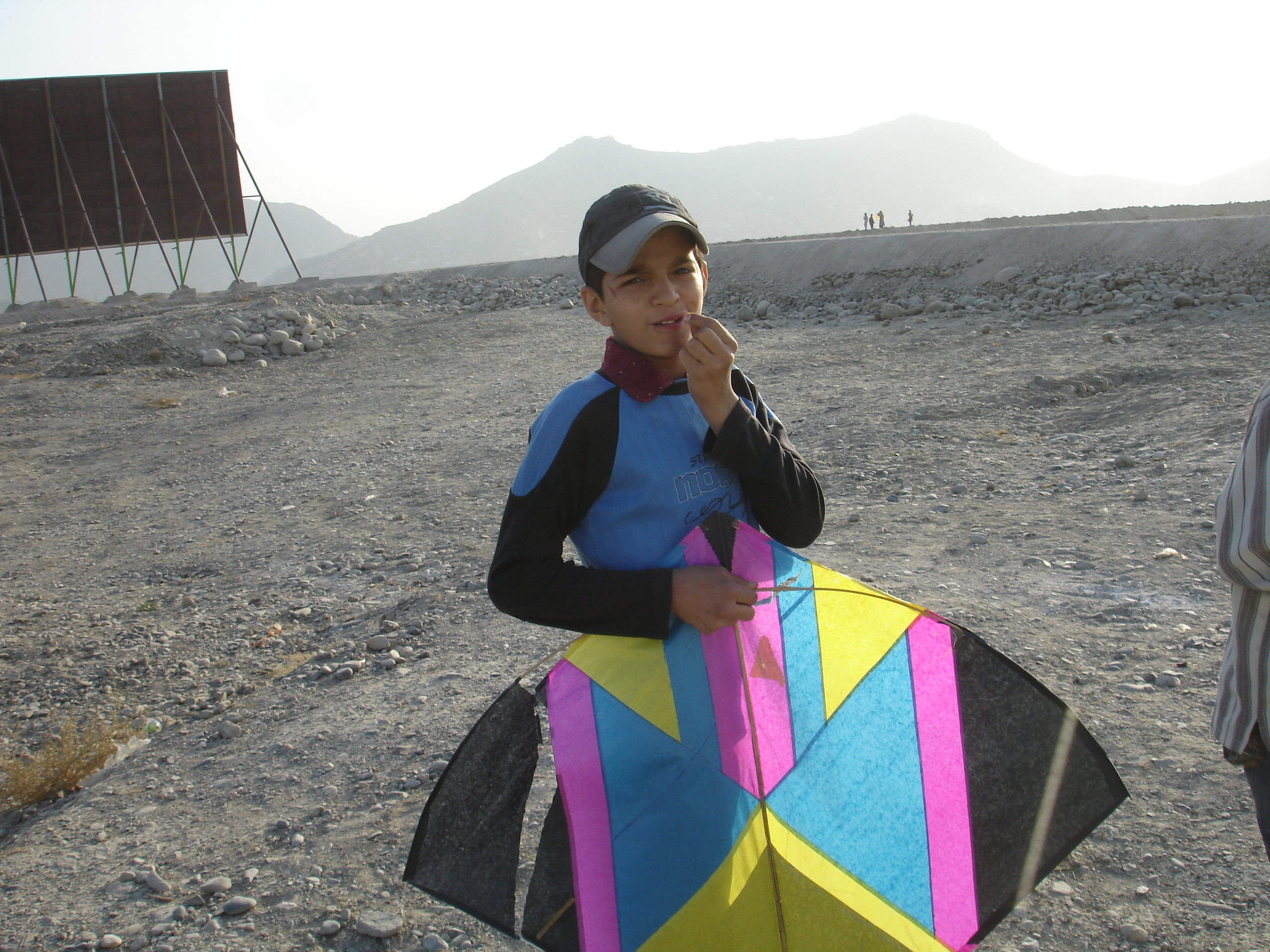
An Afghan boy with a kite

Kites and "kite fighting" are highly popular in Afghanistan especially amongst children.

== Holidays ==
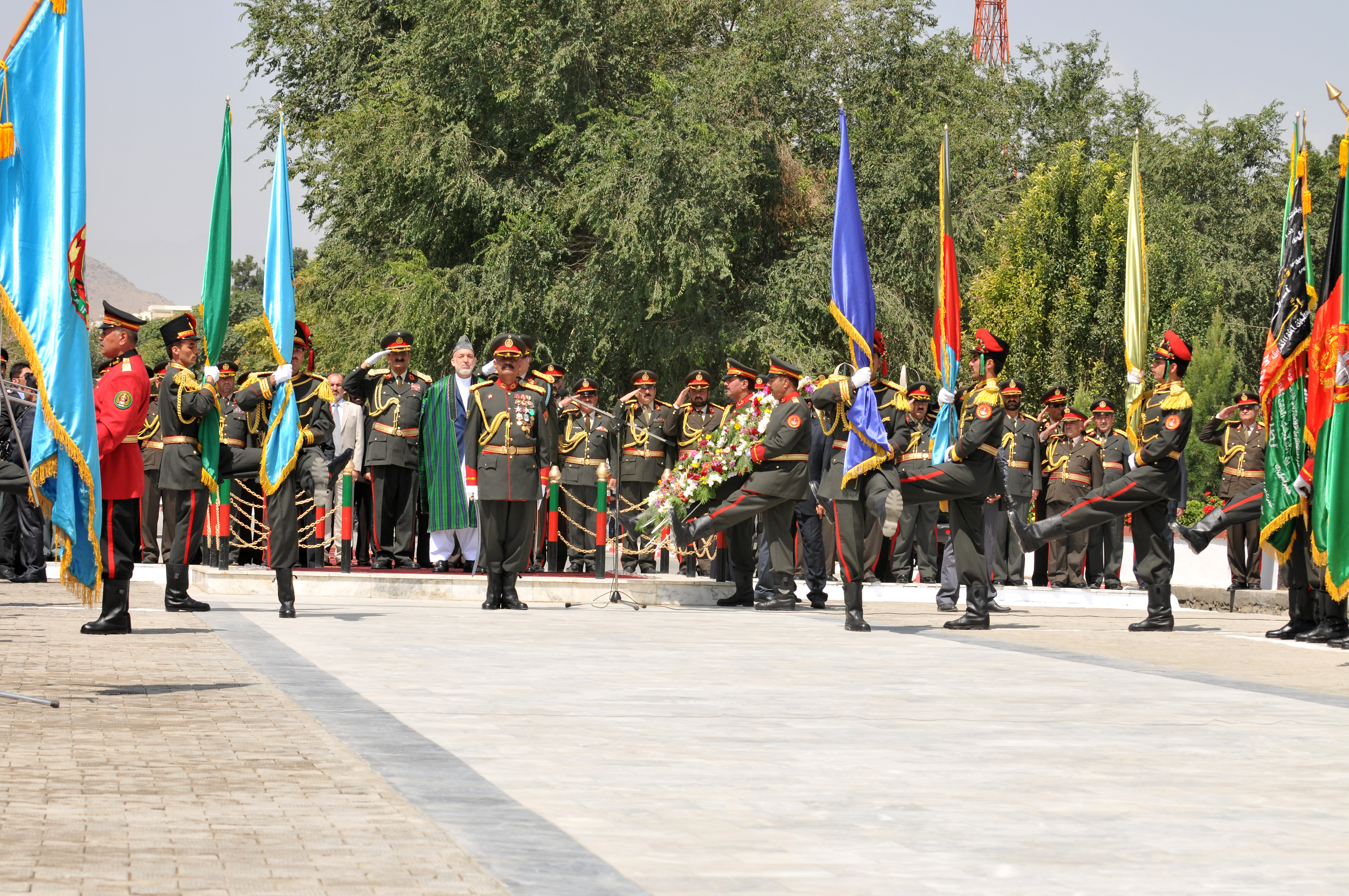
President Hamid Karzai observing the honor guard of the Afghan armed forces during the 2011 Afghan Independence Day.

=== Religious ===
Afghanistan's religious holidays are nearly the same as Islamic holidays. Some of the most important include Eid al-Fitr (end of Ramadan), Eid al-Adha, Ashura, and Mawlid, while the religious minorities of Afghanistan celebrate holidays unique to their respective religion.

=== Traditional ===
Farmer's Day, also known as Nauruz (Nowruz), is an ancient annual Afghan festival which celebrates both the beginning of spring and the New Year. The observances usually last two weeks, culminating on the first day of the Afghan New Year, 21 March, and corresponds to the first day of the Afghan Calendar.

Nauruz is related to a religion called Zoroastrianism which was in practice in ancient Afghanistan before the emergence of Islam. This festival is to celebrate the arrival of spring as plants, trees, and flowers start to bloom making the weather pleasant. On the day of Nauruz, families usually celebrate the festival by cooking food and going out for a picnic. Families cook various kinds of meals, Samanak, and Haft-mewah or dry fruits that start with the letter (س) or (S) which represents the arrival of spring season. Haft-mewah contains seven dry fruits which families place in warm water two to three days before Nauruz. Samanak is another type of dessert made from wheat and sugar. Women usually get together days before Nauruz to prepare Samanak. They pour the ingredients into a big pot placed on an open fire and take turns to stir the wheat and sugar in the pot before it turns into a thick paste. Once prepared, the dessert is then served on the day of Nauruz.

=== National ===
- Afghan Independence Day (19 August 19)
- Mujahideen Victory Day (28 April)

=== Other ===
- International Women's Day (8 March)
- Remembrance Day for Martyrs and Disabled (9 September)

== See also ==
- Bacha Bazi
- Demography of Afghanistan
- Postage stamps and postal history of Afghanistan
