= ATVI =

ATVI may refer to:

- Activision Blizzard
- Afghanistan Technical Vocational Institute
