= Abdul Hadi Dawi High School =

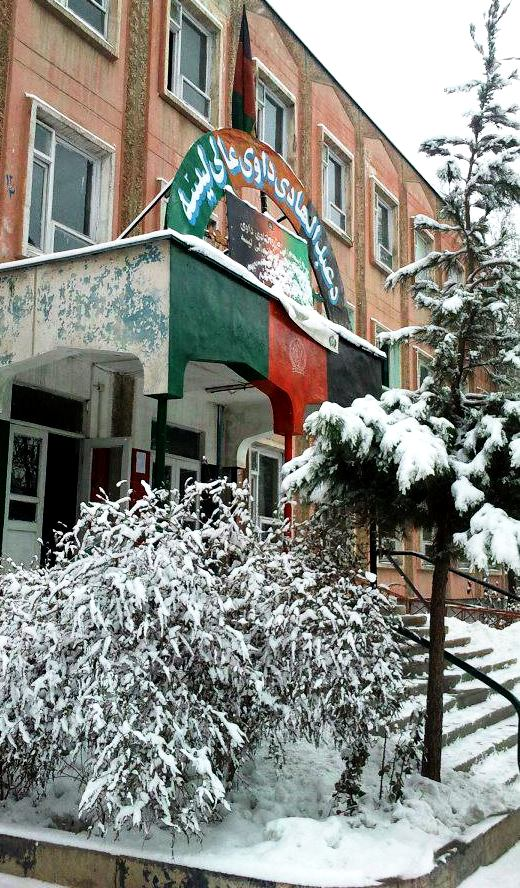

Location
- District 9, Kabul; Afghanistan
- Coordinates: 34.537°N 69.196°E

Information
- Type: Public School
- Established: 1984
- Enrollment: 4663

Abdul Hadi Dawi High School, located in Kabul's District 9 near the 3rd Mikrorayon, is named after Abdul Hadi Dawi (Abdul Hadi Dawai), a renowned Afghan poet, diplomat and government official.

The High school is generally for boys and was first constructed during the Babrak Karmal regime with the aid and support of former Soviet Union government that backed the Afghan Communist Party both financially and militarily at the time.

At first it was named Enqelaab (Revolution) High School in commemoration of the 7th of Saur Revolution, but during Najibullah's presidency its name was changed to Abdul Hadi Dawi High School.

== See also ==
- List of schools in Kabul
- List of schools in Afghanistan
- Microrayons
