= Ghulam Haider Khan High School =

Ghulam Haidar Khan High School

Location
- Kabul, Kabul Province; Afghanistan
- Coordinates: 34.5798°N 69.1384°E

Information
- Classes: 7 to 12

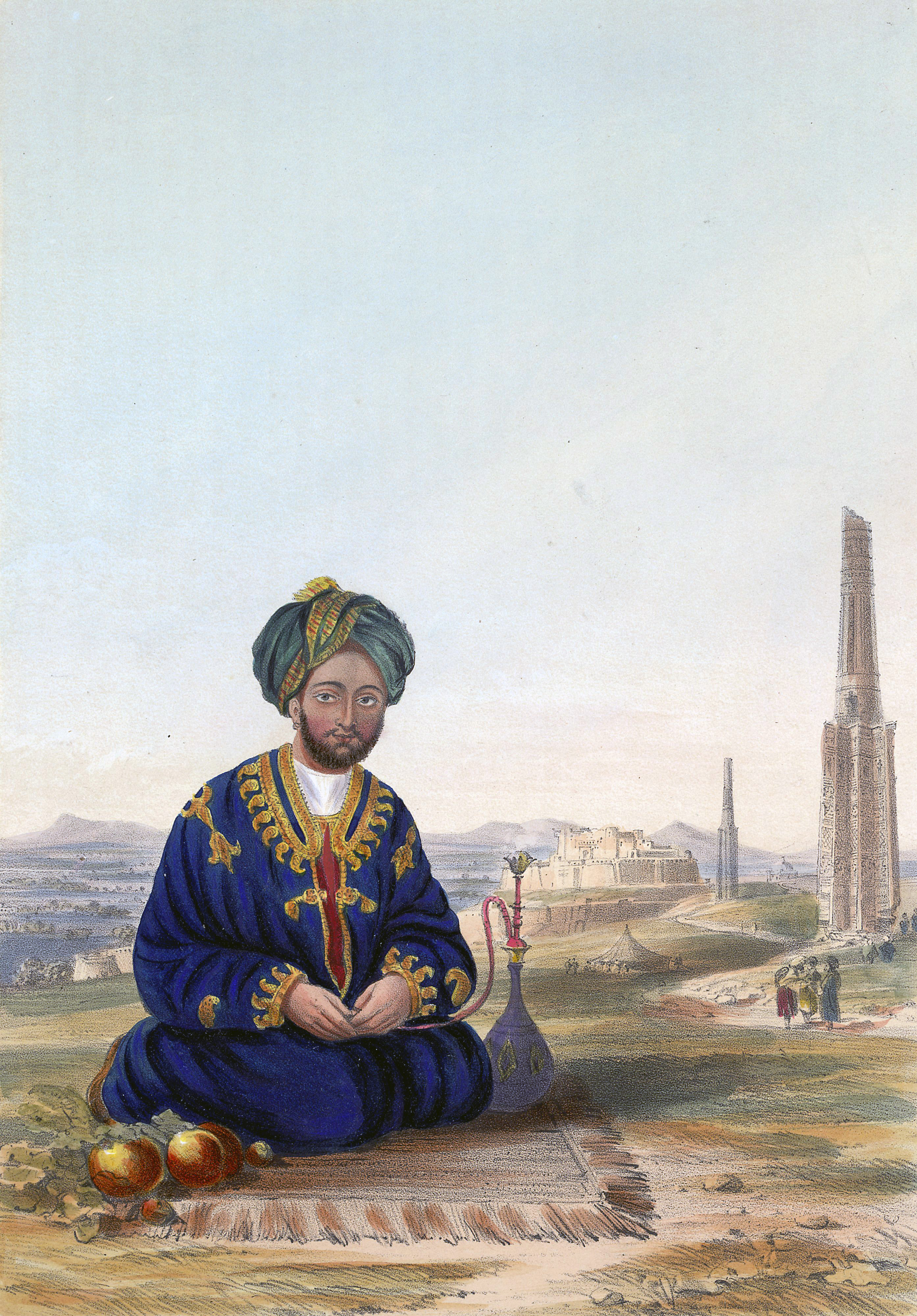
Ghulam Haidar Khan in 1839

Ghulam Haidar Khan High School is an all-boys school located in Khair Khana, Kabul, Afghanistan. The school is named after Afghan Prince Ghulam Haidar Khan, son of Emir Dost Mohammad Khan, who fought against the British forces in the July 1839 Battle of Ghazni during the First Anglo-Afghan War. It has about 10,000 students from seven to twelfth grade in four shifts.

== History ==
The original school name was "Saboor e Shaheed" from when the school was built until after Dr. Najibullah's government in 1992. Displaced families were accommodated in the school in the 1990s.

== Staff ==
- Asadullah Kohistani - Principal
- Mashooq Khan, chemistry teacher and also the science laborant
- Ali sina Mustafa, assistant Principal
- Fazel Rahman Fazel, assistant Principal
- Khal Mohammad Shejaye assistant Principal
- Agha Sahib, assistant Principal
- Esmat Subhani, Lecturer - English Language
- Dad ul haq Khan, Lecturer - Pashtoo Language
- Abdul Muneer Rueen (He is also the founder of Teacher Rueen High Educational Center in Khairkhana, Kabul.)
- Mehraban Saheb, Lecturer - Dari Language
- Laila Safi, Lecturer - Computer Science
- Shukoor Khan, Lecturer - Islamic Religion (Olom Deeni)
- Qadeer Khan, Lecturer - Chemistry
- Abdulhakim Barkzai, Lecturer - Mathematics
- Zarghuna Jaan, Lecturer - English Language
- Sajadullah Safi - newspaper manager

== See also ==
- Education in Afghanistan
- List of schools in Kabul
- Kabul
