= Mohammad Ghous Bashiri =

Afghan politician

Honorable Mohammad Ghous Bashiri
- Born: 1956 (age 68–69); Kabul, Afghanistan
- Years active: 1981–present

Mohammad Ghous Bashiri (born 1956, Kabul, Afghanistan) is an Afghan politician.

== Early life ==
Bashiri graduated from Habibia High School in 1975 and studied natural science at Kabul University.

== Career ==
After graduating, Bashiri worked as a general officer in the Work Retirement Department (1981-1982), Salary System (1982), and the Cluster Management Department (1983-1987) before becoming the General Director for Labor, Wages and Production (1988-1991). In 1987, he served as part of the Labor Law Draft Committee and oversaw capacity building programs in Warsaw, Poland, and the Labor Institute of India between 1987 and 2001. In 1992, he was acting director of the Human Resource and Employment office before being exiled 1993-2001. Upon his return, he spent a brief period as Acting Minister in the Ministry of Labor and Social Affairs before holding the job permanently until 2010. In 2006, he was head of the Draft Committee of Labor Law and in 2011 became a member of the Consulting Loyajirgah. In 2012, he became a senior advisor for the Ministry of Public Works.
