= Wasef Bakhtari =

Afghan poet (1943–2023)

Wasef Bakhtari واصف باختری
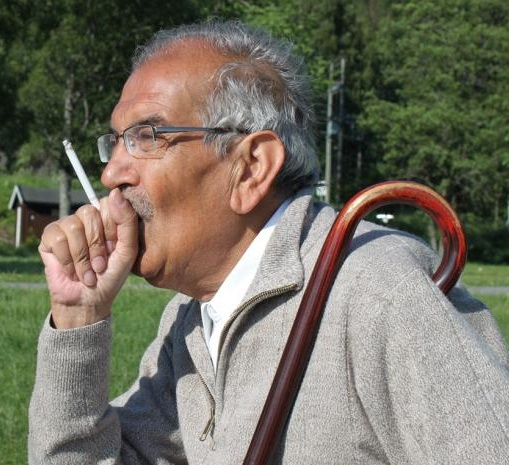
- Born: 15 March 1943; Balkh, Afghanistan
- Died: 19 July 2023 (aged 80); California, U.S.
- Citizenship: Afghan
- Education: Kabul University
- Occupations: Professor, poet, writer, linguist, historian
- Title: Ustad (Professor)
- Website: www.wasefbakhtari.com

Wasef Bakhtari (Persian: استاد واصف باختری; 15 March 1943 – 19 July 2023) was an Afghan poet and literary figure.

== Personal life ==
Bakhtari was born in Balkh on 15 March 1943. He spent most of his childhood in Mazar-i-Sharif. He attended Bakhtar School for his primary and for most of his secondary education. After his family moved to Kabul, he finished Habibia High School in 1965. He held a BA degree in Persian literature from Kabul University. He did his graduate studies in the U.S., where he received a master's degree in education from Columbia University in 1976. In 1996 Bakhtari, then a professor of literature at Kabul University, and his wife Noriajan were forced to flee Afghanistan because of the intolerance of the Taliban. They sought refuge in Pakistan. Soon after Nooria died, he remarried to Soriya Bakhtari, but with a rise in Taliban influence there as well, returned to the United States with the help of World Relief and the United Nations High Commission for Refugees, which resettled them in New Port Richey, Florida. They moved to California after three months.

Wasef Bakhtari died in California on 19 July 2023, at the age of 80.

== Professional and political career ==
For 15 years, Bakhtari worked for the Ministry of Education, writing and translating text books. In 1978, he became the editor-in-chief of Zhwandoon magazine. He had also served as a professor at Kabul University and influenced many other Persian writers and poet in Afghanistan.

Bakhtari was a founder and leader of the leftist and Maoist party, Shalleh-ye Javiyd. In 1978, when the Khalqi government took power in the Saur Revolution, he was thrown into prison for two years. He left politics after he was freed in 1980.

== Poetry and literature ==
Bakhtari was one of the most noted modern Persian poets and writers in Afghanistan. He was regarded as a literary leader to most Persian writers, poets, and linguists in Afghanistan. He was one of the first Persian poets to introduce she’r-e nimaa'i ("Nimaic poetry") and he is regarded in having his own style of Persian poetry. He was under the influence of Rahi Moayeri, Amiri Firoozkouhi, and Ahmad Shamlou.

== See also ==
- Persian literature
