= Khair Khāna =

Khair Khana خیرخانه
- Municipal District
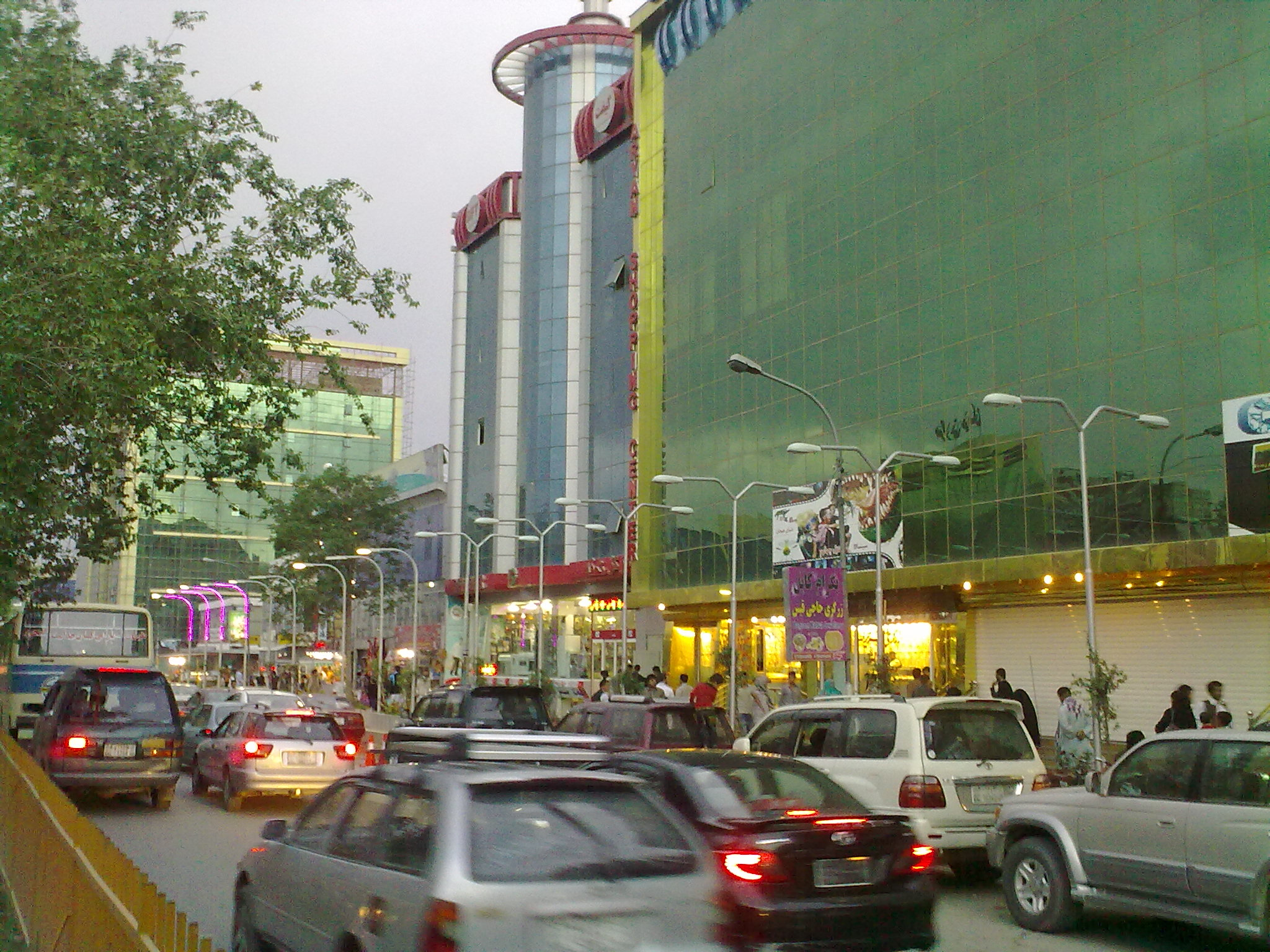
- Lycee Maryam shopping area in 2012

- Coordinates: 34.576996°N 69.130620°E
- Country: Afghanistan
- Province: Kabul
- District: Kabul
- City: Kabul
- Hawza/Nahia: 11

Area
  - Land: 17.4 km^{2} (6.7 sq mi)

Population (2025)
  - Total: 375,350
  - Density: 21,600/km^{2} (55,900/sq mi)
- Time zone: UTC+04:30 (Afghanistan Time)

Khair Khana (Pashto; Dari: خير خانه) is a working-class neighborhood in the northwestern part of Kabul, Afghanistan. It is within the jurisdiction of Municipal District 11 (Nahia 11) and has an estimated population of 375,350 people. The neighborhood is diverse, with all ethnic groups of Afghanistan owning homes and businesses, although the Tajiks historically made up the majority of its residents. This is due to its close proximity to Afghanistan's northern provinces, where they are the majority.

Khair Khana has a land area of approximately 17.4 km^{2} (6.7 sq mi). It is predominantly a residential suburb about 6 km (3.7 mi) from the city's center, with a boom of high rise constructions and modern apartments, as the area has seen major redevelopments in the last 25 years. To its southwest is Saraye Shamali (North House) Square and the Kabul-Charikar Highway.

Khair Khana has a number of public and private schools, mosques, business centers, banks, hospitals, wedding halls, and public parks. The largest shopping area is Lycee Maryam, which has many big and small businesses.

== History ==
Khair Khana was developed on the site of Khair Khaneh in the 1960s, as a plan to expand the city of Kabul. It mostly consists of regular blocks and paved road grids.

Khair Khana mostly survived the ordeal of the Afghan Civil War (1992–96) which destroyed most of Kabul, with the neighborhood remaining largely intact. Many people from other parts of Kabul came here to take shelter.

== Places of interest ==
- Shopping
  - Lycee Maryam Road
- Hotels
  - Parwan Hotel
- Restaurants
  - Al Hayat
  - Barg
  - Everest Pizza
  - Yummy
- Public parks and playgrounds
  - Bibi Sarah Park
  - Khairkhana 1 Park, between the 11th District Police Station and the local Afghan Post branch
  - Golaye Park
