= Ghazi High School =

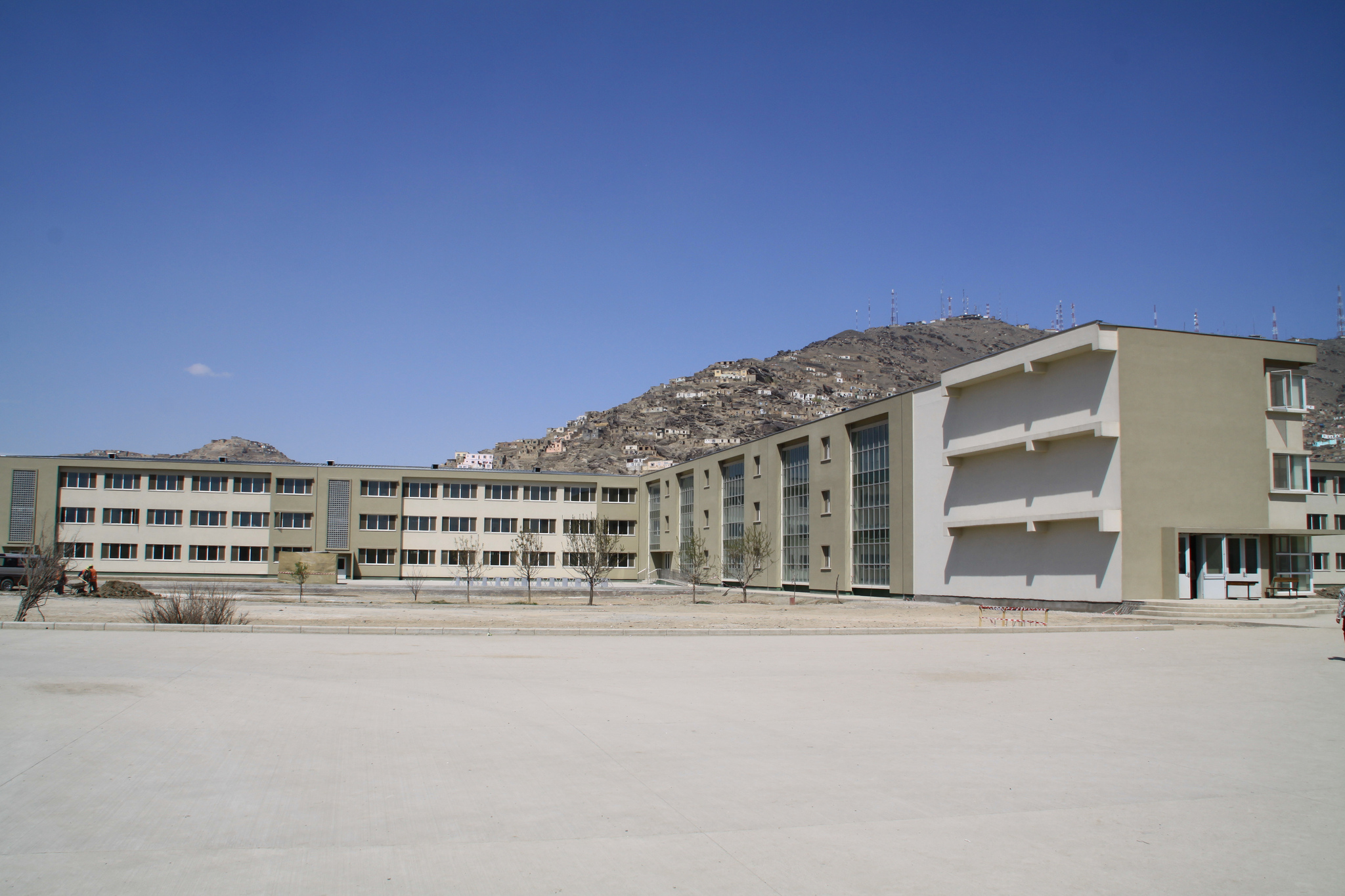
- The school after renovation in 2011

Location
- Sevom Aqrab Rd; Kabul, Kabul Province; Afghanistan
- Coordinates: 34.5118257°N 69.1436799°E

Information
- Established: 1928

Ghazi High School (Persian: لیسه غازی) is a school in Kabul, which has educated many of the former and current elite in Afghans, including Zalmay Khalilzad. It was founded by King Amanullah Khan in 1928. It is situated in the north of the city in a district known as Carteh Chahar. It suffered severe damage during the civil war of the 1990s between the different mujahideen factions who had ousted the government of Mohammad Najibullah in 1992.

== Rebuilding ==
The reconstruction of Ghazi High School by both the Afghan and U.S. government was funded by the USAID’s Kabul Schools Program. The school will be able to accommodate almost 5,400 students a year.

== See also ==
- Education in Afghanistan
- List of schools in Kabul
- List of schools in Afghanistan
