= Habibia High School =

School in Kabul, Afghanistan

Location
- Ayub Khan Mina, District 8, Kabul; Afghanistan; 34°30′00.00″N 69°08′59.34″E

Information
- Established: 1903
- Principal: Sayed Naasir Askarzada
- Teaching staff: 250
- Enrollment: 7579

Habibia High School (Pashto: د حبیبیې عالي لیسه Dari: لیسه عالی حبیبیه) is a school in Kabul, Afghanistan which has educated many of the former and current Afghan elite, including former Presidents Ashraf Ghani, Hamid Karzai, Sibghatullah Mojaddedi, and Mohammad Najibullah, as well as musician Ahmad Zahir. It was founded by King Habibullah Khan in 1903 and is considered one of the oldest schools In Afghanistan. It is situated in Karteh Seh, a district in the south of the Afghan capital.

Over 18,000 students are studying in three different shifts. The undergraduate enrollment is approximately 2000 students.

== History ==
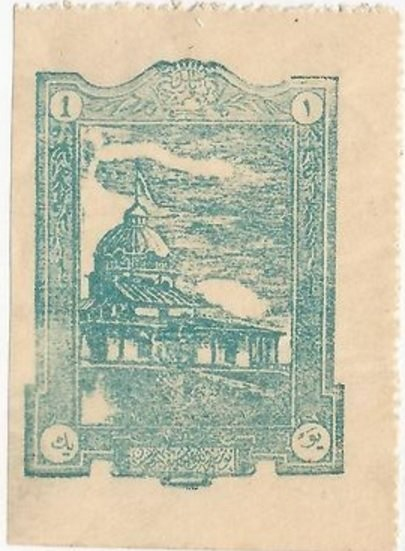
A stamp of Afghanistan from 1921 depicting the school

The school suffered severe damage during the civil war of the 1990s between the different mujahideen factions who had ousted the communist government of Mohammad Najibullah in 1992.

The Indian government gave $5 million for rebuilding the school in 2003. The restored school was inaugurated in August 2005, by Afghan President Hamid Karzai and Indian Prime Minister Manmohan Singh.

In November 2021, a powerful magnetic roadside bomb exploded near the school, injuring five.

== Notable alumni ==
- Ashraf Ghani, former president of Afghanistan
- Hamid Karzai, former president of Afghanistan
- Mohammad Hashim Maiwandwal, former Prime Minister of Afghanistan
- Mohammad Gul Khan Momand, former Home Minister of Afghanistan
- Sibghatullah Mojaddedi, former President of Afghanistan
- Mohammad Najibullah, former President of Afghanistan
- Dr. Sayed Makhdoom Raheen, former Minister of Information and Culture
- Mohammed Zahir Shah, former king of Afghanistan
- Abdul Rahim Wardak, former Defence Minister of Afghanistan
- Ahmad Zahir, legendary Afghan musician
- Dr. Hafiz Sahar, former President and Chief Editor, Daily Eslah and Kabul University professor of Journalism
- Wasef Bakhtari, prominent Afghan poet, writer, and literary figure
- Mohammad Ghous Bashiri, Afghan politician
- Abdul Ahad momand, The first Afghan astronaut

== Notable faculty ==
- Faiz Mohammad Katib Hazara, historian
- Richard N. Frye, Aga Khan Professor Emeritus of Iranian Studies at Harvard University

== See also ==
- List of schools in Kabul
- List of schools in Afghanistan
