= International School of Kabul =

Location
- Karte-Char, Kabul; Afghanistan
- Coordinates: 34°31′53.76″N 69°9′45.42″E

Information
- Motto: "Modelling Education, Shaping a Nation"
- Established: 2003
- Closed: 2015
- President: Joe Hale
- Grades: K-12
- Gender: Co-educational
- Enrollment: 386
- Language: English
- Website: Official website

The International School of Kabul (ISK) was a private co-educational K-12 school in Kabul, Afghanistan. Founded in 2003 as Kabul International Academy (KIA), the International School of Kabul provided a college-prep level U.S. (English speaking) curriculum to the children of expatriate families within the international development community and to repatriated and resident Afghans. A gift from the U.S. government in the form of a USAID grant in 2005 provided the necessary fiscal support to successfully expand the school, which was then re-chartered under the name ISK. The school closed in 2015.

== Historical information ==
In 2008, ISK became the first accredited K-12 school in Afghanistan under a full five-year accreditation issued by the Middle States Association of Colleges and Schools (MSA). Also in 2008, ISK received a twenty-year registration under the leadership of the former Minister of Education, Hanif Atmar, at a special signing ceremony conducted at the Ministry of Education. Former First Lady Laura Bush and former Secretary of State Condoleezza Rice had both taken a special interest in ISK during past visits to Kabul and met with administrative representatives of the school.

ISK was founded as Kabul International Academy under Peace Bridge International by David Michael. In 2005 the U.S.-based parent organization, Oasis International Schools received an operational grant from USAID and the name of the school was changed.

== Past leadership ==
- Dr. Byron Greene (Executive Director 2005-2009)
- Mr. John F. Brown (Executive Director, 2009-2012)
- Mr. Robert Newman (Executive Director, 2013-2014)
- Mr. Jay Silvas (Executive Director, 2015)

== Special programs ==
In addition to academics, ISK offered athletics and a full performing arts program to include music, drama, and dance. ISK served as the host site and parent organization for the Kabul Dance Studio. ISK has also represented Afghanistan with the Model United Nations (MUN) program for the past four years at Georgetown University in Qatar.

== Major accomplishments ==
- During its twelve years of operation, ISK contributed to the educational development of more than 3700 Afghan Students and celebrated the secondary graduation of 127 High School Students.
- ISK graduates experienced an overall college placement success of 85.8%.
- A cumulative total of 3.4 million classroom contact hours were provided by certified teachers.
- More than 370 expatriate faculty and staff members contributed to the success and operation of ISK.

== Historic activities ==
In 2009 ISK participated in a collaborative international writing program with Diamond Valley College near Kinglake, Victoria, Australia. As a result of this project twenty-nine ISK students were published in a book titled, "1000 Pencils: From Kinglake to Kabul." This project was the result of a combined efforts of Australian-based authors David J Williams and Neil Grant. The book has been released in a 2nd edition under the title, "From Kinglake to Kabul" and is available through commercial sources.

Also in 2010, ISK hosted actress and Grammy Award-winning singer Natalie Cole along with director/actress Sonia Nassery Cole for the Afghan release of the film, "The Black Tulip."

In 2011 ISK was officially recognized by the Ministry of Foreign Affairs as the official School for all diplomatic children in Afghanistan. International students studying at ISK may enhance their ability for collegiate placement by securing a U.S. regionally accredited International AP Diploma.

In 2013 ISK became the first organization to officially secure a "Guinness World Record" in Afghanistan for the Worlds Longest Paper Doll Chain.

In January 2015, ISK was officially closed as a direct result of security threats against the school. Reliable threats were received as retribution for the 2014 Peshawar school massacre. The parent organization, Oasis International Schools, may be contacted for all official inquiries of a technical nature.
