= Rahman Baba High School =

School in Deh Bori, Kabul, Afghanistan

- د رحمان بابا عالي ليسه
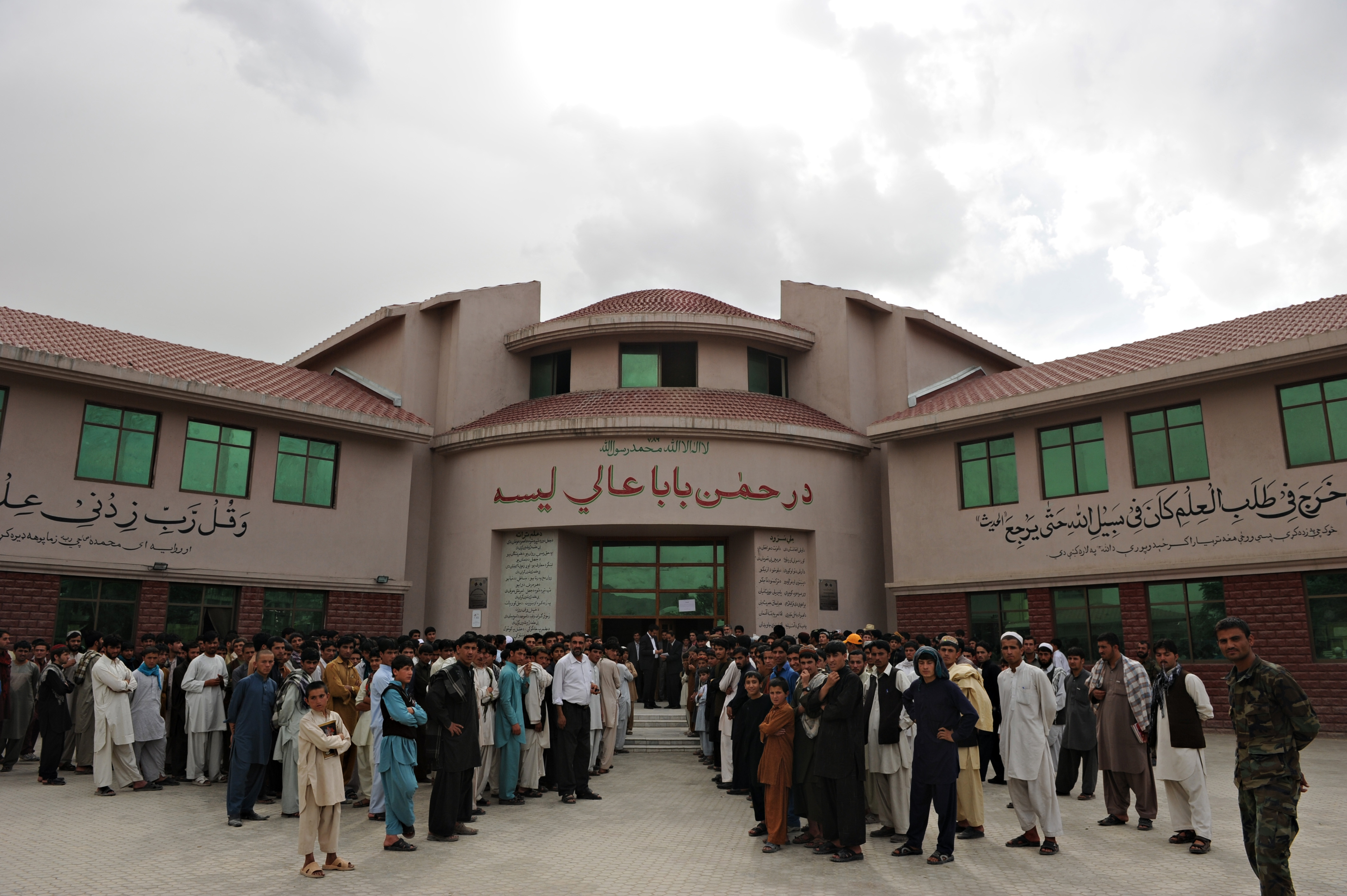

Location
- Deh Bori, Kabul, Kabul Province; Afghanistan
- Coordinates: 34°30′39″N 69°7′20″E

Information
- Type: Secondary school
- Established: 1950s
- Authority: Afghanistan Ministry of Education

The Rahman Baba High School (Pashto: د رحمان بابا عالي ليسه) is a high school located in western Kabul, Afghanistan. It was originally built in the 1950s, but saw large-scale destruction during the Soviet–Afghan War and the ongoing Afghanistan conflict. Following the United States invasion of Afghanistan, the school underwent a massive reconstruction campaign as part of a joint German, Japanese and Pakistani effort. Following its rebuilding, the school has been among the highest-ranking educational institutions in Kabul Province. It is specially dedicated to meeting the needs of students living in the rural areas of Afghanistan, and follows the curriculum of the Afghanistan Ministry of Education in the Pashto language.

The school has a specialized English program, where over 700 students from predominantly ethnic Pashtun areas develop English skills through programs conducted by the Rauf Learning Center.

== See also ==
- List of schools in Kabul
