= Nazo Ana High School =

High school in Kabul, Afghanistan

Nazo Ana High School is a boys' high school located in District 16 in Kabul, Afghanistan. The school is named after Afghan poet Nazo Tokhi.
