= Afghan Turk Maarif Schools =

Private school in Afghanistan

Afghan-Turk Maarif Schools
- Kabul, Herat, Kandahar, Mazar-e Sharif, Jalalabad, Jawzjan, Maidan Wardak; Afghanistan

Information
- Type: Private chain
- Motto: "Valuing education"
- Established: 2018
- Chairman: Ahmet TUKUR
- Grades: 0–12
- Enrollment: Over 5000
- Language: English, Dari, Pashto, Turkish, Arabic
- Colour: Turquoise - white - Navy
- Website: af.maarifschools.org

Afghan-Turk Maarif Schools are private chain of Turkish educational institutions currently working under the Turkish Maarif Foundation, an educational institution connected to Turkish Republic with a special status. 20 branches of Afghan-Turk Schools are operating in Kabul, Herat, Mezar-e Sherif, Kandahar, Celalabad, Shibirgan, Akcha, with a total student population of more than 6000.

== Establishment in Afghanistan ==
The Turkish Maarif Foundation officially began its operations in Afghanistan in 2018 after receiving registration from the Ministry of Economy of the Islamic Republic of Afghanistan in 2017 (1397 SH). In collaboration with the Afghan government, the foundation established the Afghan-Turk Maarif Schools, a network of educational institutions offering both academic and boarding facilities.

== Educational institutions ==
As of 2025, Afghan-Turk Maarif Schools operate 48 schools and 8 dormitories in 7 provinces of Afghanistan: Kabul, Mazar-e-Sharif, Herat, Jalalabad, Jawzjan, Kandahar, and Maidan Wardak. The schools serve more than 5000 students.

== Educational approach ==
Afghan-Turk Maarif Schools promote a student-centered, dialogue-based teaching model. The educational philosophy emphasizes critical thinking, research, and creativity. The curriculum incorporates both national and international elements, preparing students for higher education and global engagement.

== Languages of instruction ==
Courses are offered in Persian, Pashto, English, Turkish, and Arabic, fostering multilingualism and intercultural understanding among students. This multilingual education prepares students for global academic and professional environments.

== Extracurricular activities ==
In addition to academic programs, the schools provide supplementary education, language training, ethics and character development, exam preparation for national and international standardized tests, and spiritual education. Dormitories are designed not only as living spaces but also as environments for holistic personal development.

== Entrance examination (MAGIS) ==
Admission to Afghan-Turk Maarif Schools is based on the Maarif Admission and General Intelligence Screening (MAGIS) exam, held twice annually across Afghanistan. The exam follows international assessment standards and identifies academically talented students for admission and scholarships.

== Alumni support ==
The foundation continues to support its graduates through scholarship opportunities for higher education abroad, participation in scientific Olympiads, international academic fellowships, and study programs.

== Vision ==
The vision of Afghan-Turk Maarif Schools is to “raise morally upright and socially responsible individuals who contribute positively to their societies and the world.”
