= Afghanistan Technical Vocational Institute =

Technical vocational institute in Kabul, Afghanistan

- آموزشگاه عالی تخنیکی آموزش حرفوی افغانستان د افغانستان د تخنیکي مسلکي زده کړو انسټیټوټ
- Motto: Providing skill to make a living and education to make a change
- Type: Private University / PPP Institute
- Established: 2007; 19 years ago
- President: Assoc. Prof. Dr. Abdul Qayeum Karim
- Academic staff: 150
- Administrative staff: 120
- Students: 6000
- Location: Kabul, Afghanistan; 34.5143694°N 69.137298317°E
- Campus: AIT Compound, Next to MoHE, Kart-e Char, Kabul
- Colors: blue and green
- Website: http://atvi.edu.af (2018 archive)

Afghanistan Technical Vocational Institute (ATVI; Pashto: د افغانستان د تخنیکي مسلکي زده کړو انسټیټوټ / Persian: آموزشگاه عالی تخنیکی آموزش حرفوی افغانستان) also known as ATVI, is a technical vocational institute in Afghanistan. ATVI is to provide market oriented technical and vocational training opportunities for Afghan youth.

ATVI was established in Kabul in February 2006, as a private, non-profit, post-secondary educational institution that provides students with knowledge and skills to make them qualified employees for local businesses. This supports USAID's long-term goals of supporting the economy and particularly small businesses, increasing the employability of Afghan youth and developing a competitive Afghan workforce.

Afghan Technical Vocational Institute (ATVI) project aims to provide professional technical vocational education and training (TVET) to qualified Afghan youth and adults.

Aiming at developing the post war economy of Afghanistan, ATVI began operations in April 2007 with US$1.8 million investment in private funding and a donation of land by MoE. ATVI is managed entirely by Afghan citizens.

In 2007, ATVI committed to provide a comprehensive educational experience for Afghan students, preparing its graduates for leadership in key sectors of agriculture/horticulture, construction, information and communications technology (ICT), and vehicle maintenance in a coeducational technical and vocational post-secondary institute in Kabul.

The first class completed its 4 semester program in March 2008 with 453 graduates, 68 girls and 385 boys. The second class graduated in May 2009 with 797 graduates of whom, 188 were girls. The class of 2009–2011 enrolled 1300 students, with 600 in the new satellite campus of ATVI East located in Laghman. Till now (2016) ATVI has graduated about 6000 Students for serving Afghanistan.

The Institute provides degrees in Information Technology, Business Management, Construction, AutoMotives and Horticulture. The institute currently has three branches/campuses:

- ATVI Kabul
- ATVI Laghman
- ATVI Helmand

== Accomplishments ==
- From June 2013-December 2014, 1,052 students graduated from programs in Business Management, Construction, Horticulture, Information and Communications Technology, and Automotive Repair.
- From June 2013-December 2014, 35 teachers were trained to implement an updated TVET curriculum.
- Partnerships established with private sector organizations including the Afghanistan Builders Association (ABA), the State Business Consulting Group, the Bremen Overseas Research and Development Organization (BORDA); the Afghanistan Chamber of Commerce, and other industries to train students on decentralized waste water treatment systems.

== Sectors ==
This coeducational, post-secondary technical vocational institute prepares graduates for employment in five sectors:

- Business administration
- Information and communications technology (ICT)
- Agriculture
- Construction
- Vehicle maintenance

== See also ==
- List of universities in Afghanistan
