= Amani High School =

School in Kabul, Afghanistan

Amani High School د اماني عالي لیسه لیسه عالی امانی

Location
- Kabul (District 10); Afghanistan; 34.528767°N 69.183824°E

Information
- Other name: Amani-Oberrealschule Kabul

Amani High School (Pashto: د اماني عالي لیسه Dari: لیسه عالی امانی) also known in German as Amani-Oberrealschule Kabul, is a school in Kabul (District 10), Afghanistan. Since its founding in 1924 until 1985, Amani High School was recognized as one of the elite schools in Kabul and received direct support from Germany, which helped to provide qualified staff. German was not only taught as a foreign language, but also was the teaching language in the higher classes in most subjects, being taught by qualified German teachers. The school is under the control of the Afghan Ministry of Education.

After the US invasion in late 2001, the buildings was looted and partially destroyed. Reconstruction began with German help in spring 2002. The German support has resumed, which was suspended during the reign of the Taliban from 1996 to 2001. German teachers once again came to Afghanistan to teach. However, German is now only taught as a foreign language. Classes in all other subjects are held in Pashto and Dari. The school teaches children from class 1 to 12. Up to 4th grade the classes are coeducational. From 5th to 12th only boys are allowed.

Amani High School has two big courtyards, a mosque, a sports field with a football court, two basketball courts and stands. There are modern laboratories for the science departments: Biology, Chemistry and Physics. The classrooms are furnished with tables and chairs, which is not taken for granted in Afghan schools, even in the capital Kabul.

A ceremony to celebrate Afghanistan's return to education was held at the school, attended by interim Afghan leader Hamid Karzai. In 2007 Angela Merkel visited during her trip to Afghanistan.
