= List of universities in Afghanistan =

The following is an incomplete list of universities in Afghanistan, sorted by province and in alphabetical order.

== Balkh Province ==
University	Location	Established	Campuses	Specialization	Type
Asia Institute of Higher Education					
Aria Medical Institute of Higher Education					
Balkh University	Mazar-i-Sharif	1987		General	Public
KAWUN Institute of Higher Education					
Mawlana Jalaludin Muḥammad Balkhi Institute of Higher Education					
Sadat Institute of Higher Education					
Taj Institute of Higher Education					
Balkh Medical College					
Rahnaward University					

== Herat Province ==
University	Location	Established	Campuses	Specialization	Type
Herat University	Herat	1988		General	Public
Tolo-e-Saadat Institute of Health Science					

== Kabul Province ==
University	Location	Established	Campuses	Specialization	Type
Afghan National Defense University					
Afghanistan Technical Vocational Institute (ATVI)					
Afghan University					
Afghan-Swiss Medical University					
Afghanistan Institute Of Higher Education					
American University of Afghanistan					
Bakhtar University					
Dawat University					
Dunya University of Afghanistan (DUA)					
Gawharshad Institute of Higher Education					
Gharjistan University					
Ibne-sina Institute of Higher Education					
Information and Communication Technology Institute					
Kaboora Institute of Higher Education					
Kabul Education University of Rabbani					
Kabul Health Sciences Institute					
Kabul Medical University					
Kabul University					
Kardan University					
Karwan University					
Kateb University					
Khana-e-Noor Institute of Higher Education					
Khatam Al-Nabieen University					
Maiwand Institute of Higher Education					
Mariam Institute of Higher Education					
Maryam University	Kabul	2007		General	Private
Mashal University					
Mili Institute of Higher Education	Kabul Airport 40m road, Lab-e-jar square	2012 A.D	Lab-e-jar Square	Medical	Private
Mohmand Institute of Health Sciences					
National Military Academy of Afghanistan					
Oruj Institute of Higher Education					
Peshgam Institute of Higher Education					
Polytechnical University of Kabul					
Prestige institute of accountancy					
Qalam institute of health science					
Qalam institute of higher education					
Rabia Balkhi Institute of Higher Education					
Rana Institute of Higher Education					
Rifah Afghanistan Institute					
Salam University			Kunduz		
SWISS UMEF UNIVERSITY					
Tabesh University	Lab-e-Jar Square, Khair Khana 3	2009			

== Kandahar Province ==
University	Location	Established	Campuses	Specialization	Type
Kandahar University					
Malalay University					
Mirwais Neeka University					

== Khost Province ==
University	Location	Established	Campuses	Specialization	Type
Hara University					
Pamir University					
Shaikh Zayed University					

== Kunar Province ==
University	Location	Established	Campuses	Specialization	Type
Syed Jamaluddin Afghan University					

== Kunduz Province ==
University	Location	Established	Campuses	Specialization	Type
Kohandazh Institute of Higher Education					
Kunduz University					

== Laghman Province ==
University	Location	Established	Campuses	Specialization	Type
Laghman University	Mihtarlam	2011			

== Logar Province ==
University	Location	Established	Campuses	Specialization	Type
Logar University					

== Nangarhar Province ==
University	Location	Established	Campuses	Specialization	Type
Alfalah University	Jalalabad	2011		Economics, Engineering, Journalism, Sharia’h, Law	
Ariana University	Jalalabad	2004			
Khurasan University	Jalalabad	2006		Management Sciences, Engineering, Computer Sciences, Journalism & Mass Communication, Business Administration	
Nangarhar University	Jalalabad	1973			
Rokhan University					
Spinghar Higher Education Centre					

== Other provinces ==
University	Location	Established	Campuses	Specialization	Type	Province
Alberoni University	Kohistan	1998			Kapisa Province	
Badakhshan University					Badakhshan Province	
Badghis University					Badghis Province	
Bamyan University						Bamyan Province
Bost University	Lashkargah	2012			Helmand Province	
Borna Institute of Higher Education						Badakhshan Province
Farah University						Farah Province
Faryab Higher Education Institute						Faryab Province
Ghazni University						Ghazni Province
Ghor University						Ghor Province
Helmand University	Lashkargah	2006				Helmand Province
Ibn Sina University						Nangrahar Province
Jowzjan University						Jowzjan Province
Khawja Abdullah Ansari Higher Education Institute						Herat Province
Paktia University						Paktia Province
Parwan University						Parwan Province
Samangan University						Samangan Province
Takhar University						Takhar Province
Uruzgan University						Uruzgan Province
Wardak University						Wardak Province

== See also ==
- Higher education in Afghanistan
- Ministry of Higher Education (Afghanistan)
