= Education in Afghanistan =

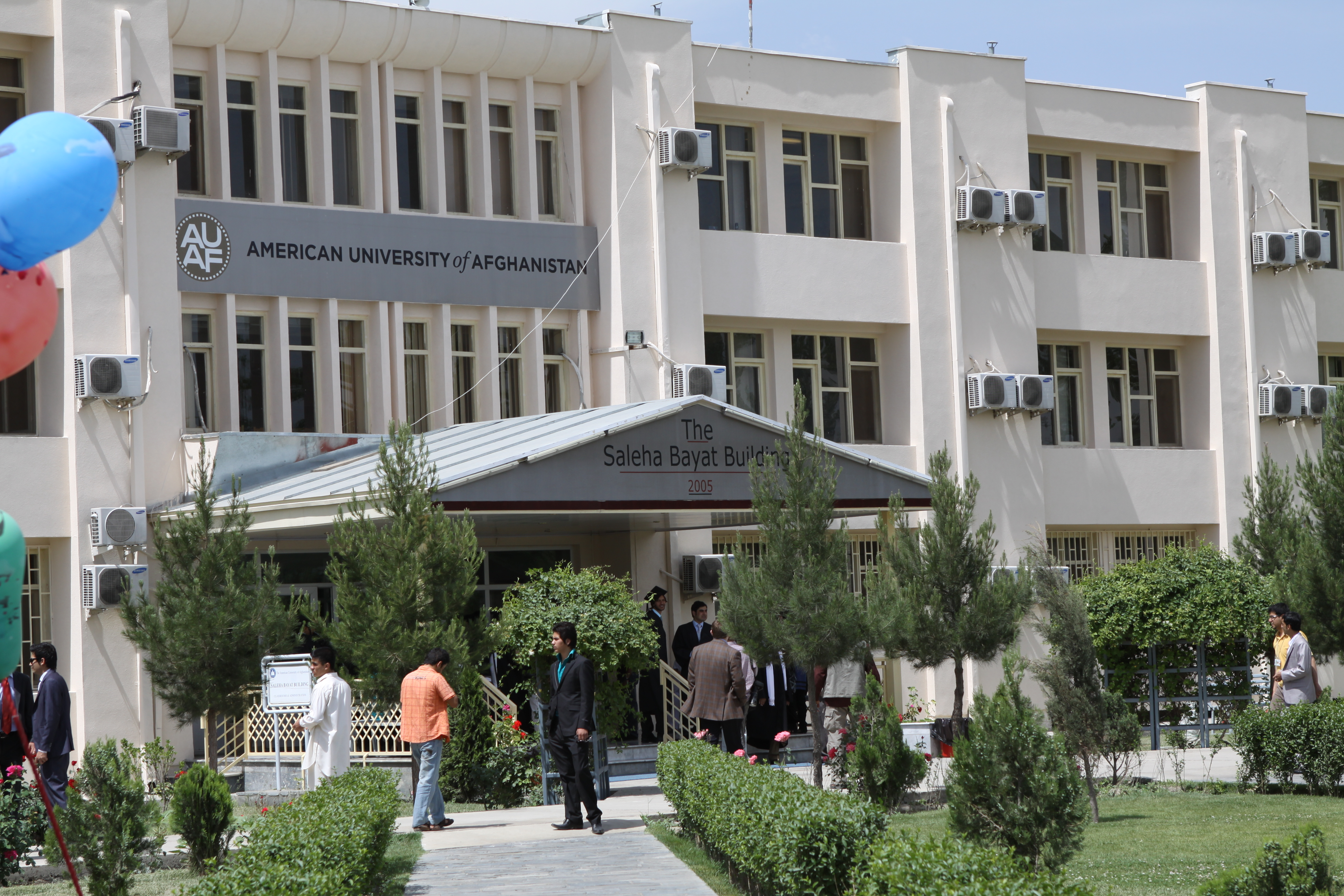
The American University of Afghanistan (AUAF) in Kabul

Education in Afghanistan includes K–12 and higher education, which is under the Ministry of Education and Ministry of Higher Education. In 2021, there were nearly 10 million students and 220,000 teachers in Afghanistan. The nation still requires more schools and teachers. Soon after the Taliban took over the country in August 2021, they banned girls from secondary education. Some provinces still allow secondary education for girls despite the ban. In December 2022, the Taliban government also prohibited university education for females in Afghanistan, sparking protests and international condemnation. In December 2023, investigations were being held by the United Nations into the claim that Afghan girls of all ages were allowed to study at religious schools. As of November 2024, some parts of the country allow women to attend religious schools to pursue dentistry, nursing, and other subjects.

According to Acting Education Minister Noorullah Munir, "Afghanistan has 20,000 official schools in which 9,000 are of no use, 5,000 have no building and the remaining 4,000 needed rehabilitation." Compulsory education in Afghanistan is through the ninth grade. "The academic year consists of 2 semesters, and runs from March to January." Since the Taliban takeover of Afghanistan in August 2021, officials under the Islamic Emirate have suspended secondary education to teenage girls.

Education improved in Afghanistan after the Taliban government was deposed in 2001. In 2013, 8.2 million Afghans attended school, including 3.2 million girls. This compared to only 1.2 million Afghans attending school in 2001, with fewer than 50,000 being girls. 39% of girls were attending school in 2017 compared to 6% in 2003. In 2021, a third of students at university were women. Since 2002, the literacy rate has risen by 8% to 43% as of 2021.

Some of the major universities in Afghanistan are the American University of Afghanistan (apparently defunct as of 2021), Kabul University, Kabul Polytechnic University, Al-Beroni University, Kardan University, Balkh University, Herat University, Nangarhar University, Shaikh Zayed University, Kandahar University, Bost University, Paktia University, Kunduz University, Badakhshan University, and Ghazni University.

== History ==
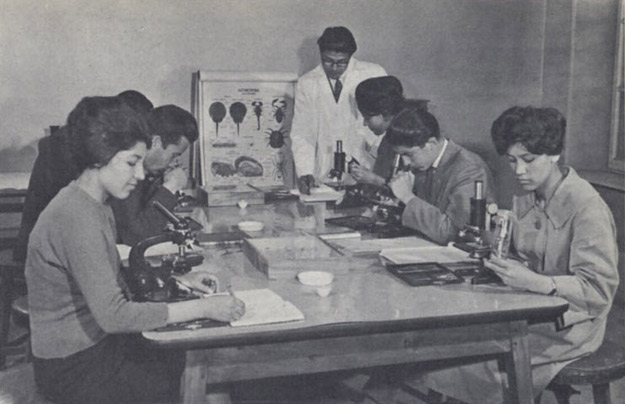
Kabul University's biology class during the late 1950s or early 1960s.

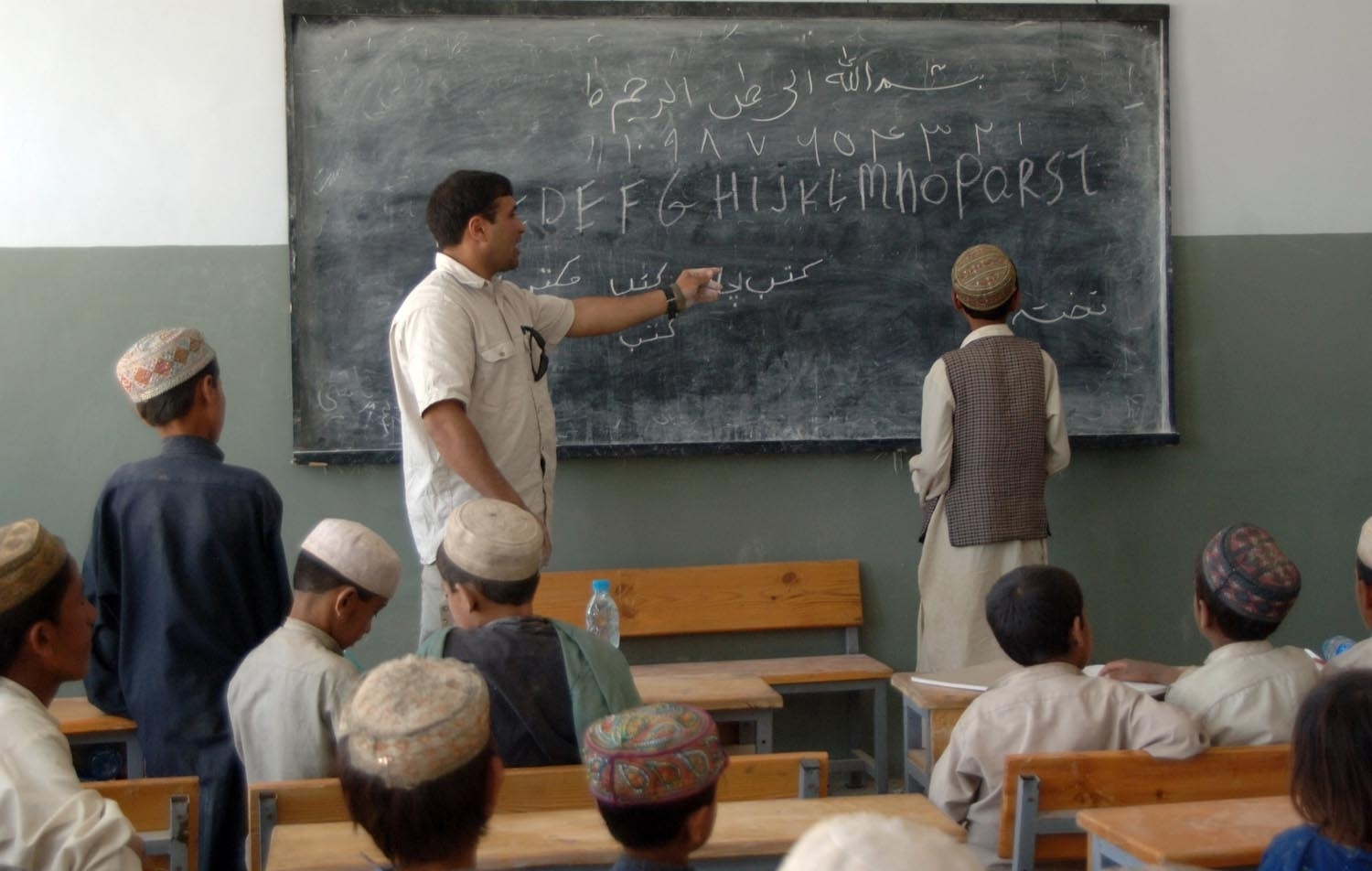
Typical classroom of a public school in rural Afghanistan

One of the oldest schools in Afghanistan is the Habibia High School in Kabul, which was built by King Habibullah Khan in 1903 to educate students from the nation's elite class. In the 1920s, the German-funded Amani High School opened in Kabul, and about a decade later two French lycées (secondary schools) began, the AEFE and the Lycée Esteqlal. Kabul University was established in 1932.

Education was improved under the rule of King Zahir Shah between 1933 and 1973, making primary schools available to about half the population who were younger than 12 years of age and expanding the secondary school system and Kabul University. Of the 10.3 billion Afghans. spent on the first "Five Year Plan" (1956-1962), "7.7% was appropriated for education and health as compared to 49.5% for transportation and communication, 26.5% on industrial development, 12.6% for agriculture, and 3.8% for miscellaneous development works." By the end of the program, "the number of students (primary, secondary, and vocational) rising from 96.34 to 169.06 per 10,000 of population. The number of students receiving higher education per 10,000 of population, rose from 0.66 to 1.44, and construction of a new campus for the Kabul University was taken in hand. After the Taliban took over in 2021, the number of students acquiring higher education per 10,000 people decreased substantially. This is due to lost of jobs of their tuition supporters who were in the previous government. Many of the students also fled the country.

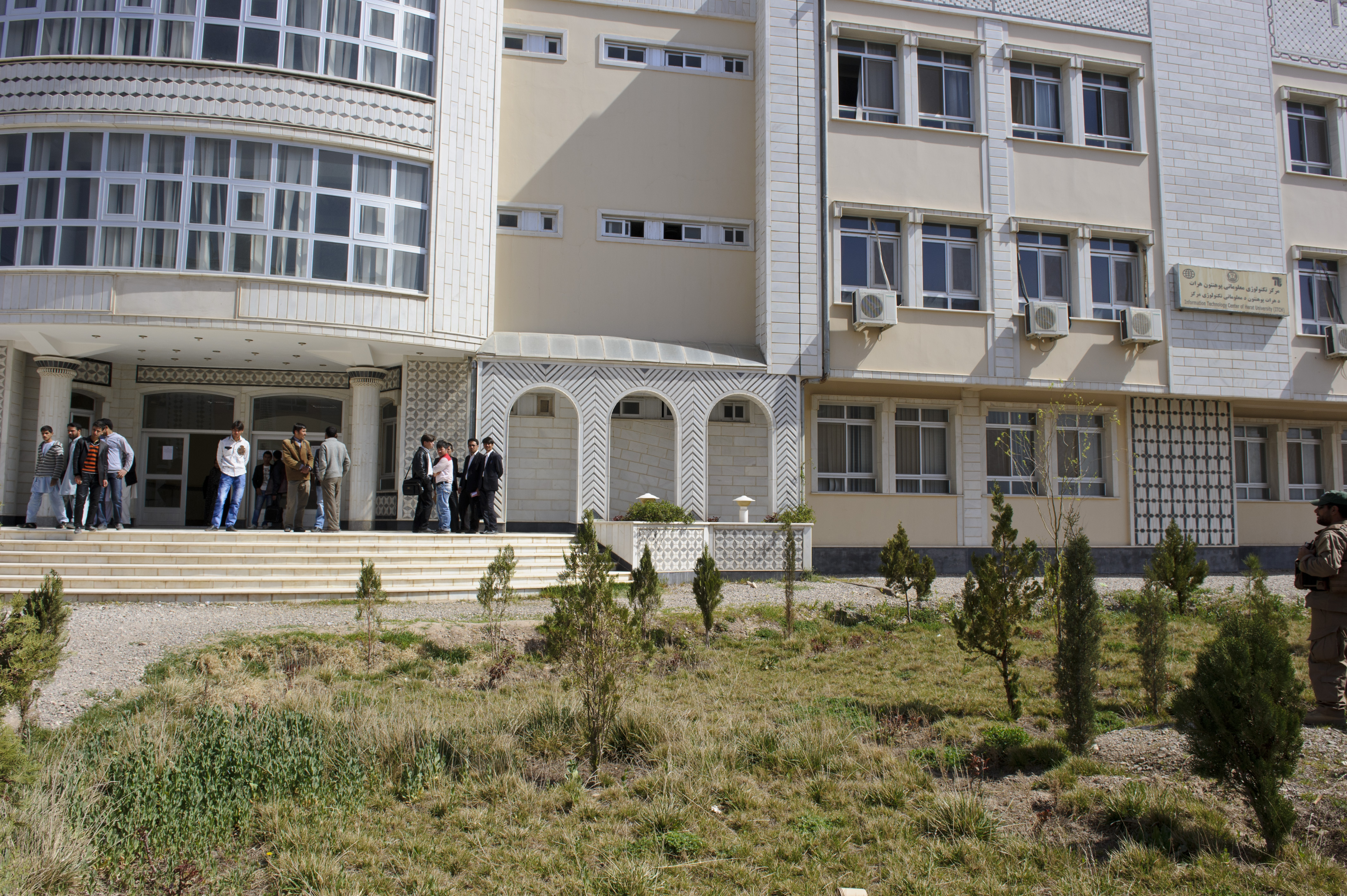
Students standing in front of the main campus of Herat University in western Afghanistan.

During the Democratic Republic of Afghanistan, the government of the People's Democratic Party of Afghanistan (PDPA) reformed the education system; education was stressed for both sexes, and widespread literacy programs were set up. However, in 1980 sulfur was added to Kabul schools' water supply, resulting in over a thousand schoolchildren being admitted to the Aliabad hospital in just one week. The government blamed the poisoning of the water supply on mujahideen rebels.

After the overthrow of the Taliban in late 2001, the Karzai administration received substantial international aid to restore the education system. Around 7,000 schools were operating in 20 of the 32 provinces by the end of 2003, with 27,000 teachers teaching 4.2 million children (including 1.2 million girls). Of that number, about 3.9 million were in primary schools.

An estimated 57 percent of men and 86 percent of women were reported to be illiterate, and the lack of skilled and educated workers was a major economic disadvantage. When Kabul University reopened in 2002, some 24,000 male and female students enrolled for higher education. In the meantime, five other universities were being rehabilitated. Public school curricula have included religious subjects but detailed instruction is left to religious teachers.

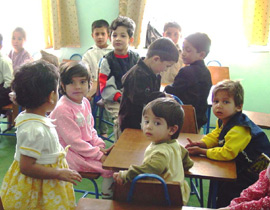
A kindergarten classroom (c. 2004)

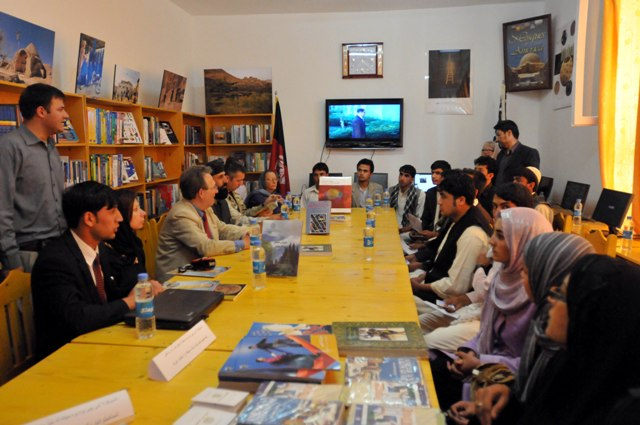
U.S. Deputy Ambassador to Afghanistan Anthony Wayne and Ghazni Provincial Governor Musa Khan Ahmadzai talk to students who use Afghanistan's newest Lincoln Learning Center in Ghazni City.

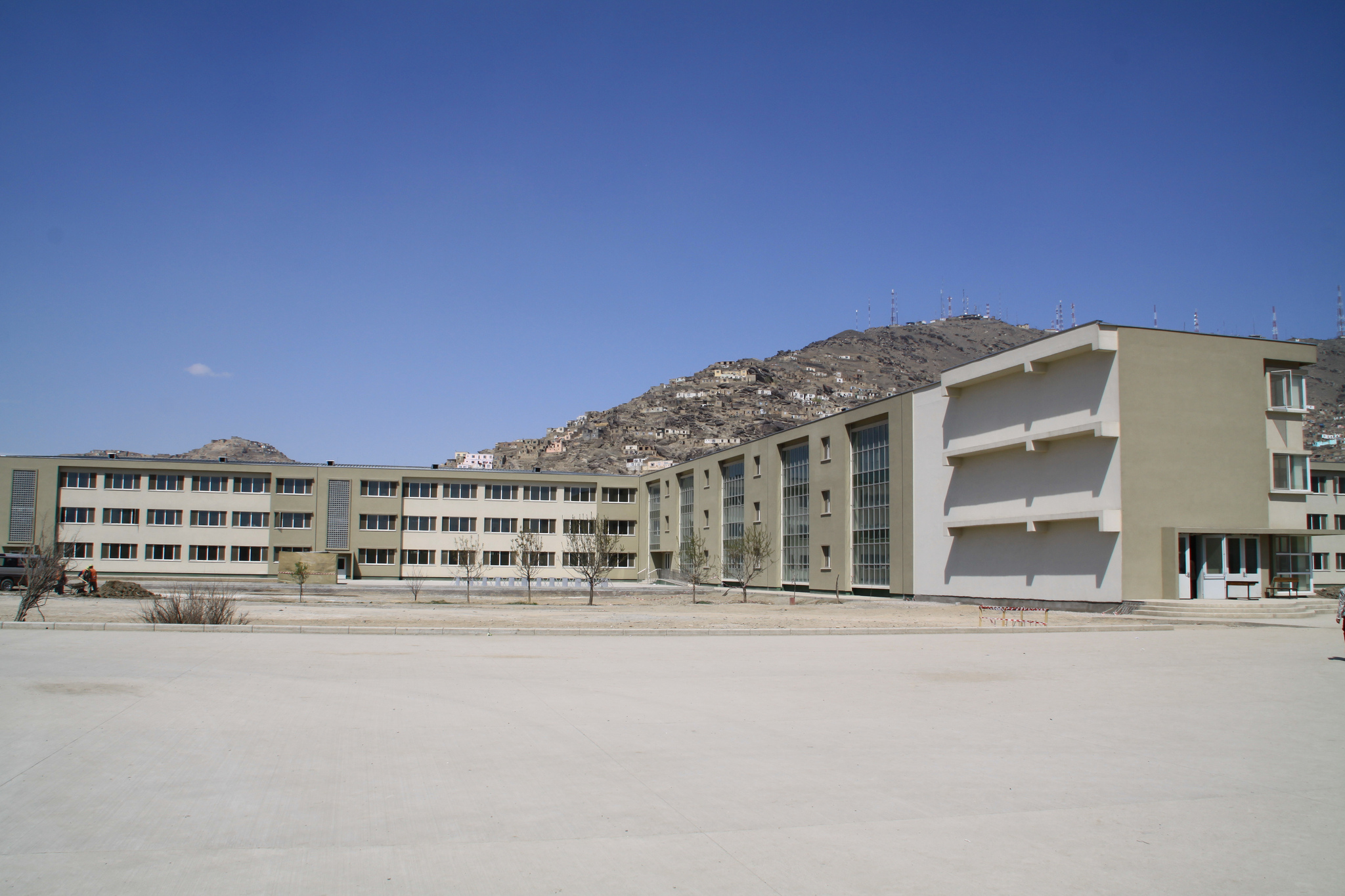
Ghazi High School, which is one of many public schools in Kabul. Similar public and private schools exist in all major cities of Afghanistan.

By 2006, over 4 million male and female students were enrolled in schools throughout Afghanistan. At the same time school facilities or institutions were also being refurbished or improved, with more modern-style schools being built each year. The American University of Afghanistan (AUAF) in Kabul was established in 2006. Other universities were renovated or rebuilt, such as Kandahar University in the south, Nangarhar University and Khost University in the east, Herat University in the west and Balkh University in the north. Despite these achievements, there were still significant obstacles to education in Afghanistan, many of which stem from a lack of funding. Planning curricula and school programs is difficult for the Ministry of Education because a significant amount of the budget for education comes from external donors, making it difficult to predict the annual budget.

The obstacles to education were even more numerous for Afghan girls. Afghanistan's then Education Minister, Mohammad Hanif Atmar, said in 2007 that 60% of students were studying in tents or other unprotected structures, and some parents refused to let their daughters attend schools in such conditions.

In 2009, another concern was the destruction of schools by the Taliban, especially schools for females. Following the destruction of over 150 schools in a year, many parents had doubts about the government's ability to protect them.

The following achievements were made in the first decade of the 2000s:

- Between 2001 and 2016, primary school enrollment rose from around 1 million to 9.2 million (a nine-fold increase in fifteen years) and the proportion of girls from virtually zero to 37%. UNESCO estimates that 129 million females are out of school around the world, with 32 million in primary school and 97 million in secondary school.
- The number of teachers in general education has risen sevenfold, but their qualifications are low. About 31% are women.
- Between 2003 and 2011, over 5,000 school buildings were rehabilitated or newly constructed. Just over 50% of schools have usable buildings.

Enrollment is low: The average is 1,983 students per institution; three institutions have fewer than 200 students. Furthermore, there is a deficiency of qualified faculty members: only 4.7% (166 of total 3,522) of the teaching staff held a Ph.D. In “addition to problems of inadequate resources, and lack of qualified teaching staff are issues of corruption.”

In 2010, the United States began establishing Lincoln Learning Centers in Afghanistan. They serve as programming platforms offering English language classes, library facilities, programming venues, Internet connectivity, educational and other counseling services. A goal of the program is to reach at least 4,000 Afghan citizens per month per location.

According to the Human Development Index, in 2011, Afghanistan was the 15th least developed country in the world.

In 2009 and 2010, a 5,000 OLPC – One Laptop Per Child schools deployment took place in Kandahar with funding from an anonymous foundation. The OLPC team seeks local support to undertake a larger deployment.

In June 2011, officials from the United States signed a joint statement with Education Minister Ghulam Farooq Wardak to expand opportunities for direct financial support from USAID to the Afghan Ministry of Education. In December 2011, the Baghch-e-Simsim (Afghan version of Sesame Street) children's television series was launched in Afghanistan. It is funded by the U.S. Department of State and is produced in consultation with Afghanistan's Ministry of Education. The project is designed to help educate Afghans from pre-school stage and onward.

It was reported in May 2013 that there were 16,000 schools across Afghanistan, with 10.5 million students. Education Minister Wardak stated that 3 million children remained deprived of education and requested $3 billion to construct 8,000 additional schools over the next two years.

Afghanistan's story in education is still confronted by major challenges. Three and a half million children – 75% of them girls – are still out of school. Poverty, the lack of qualified female teachers in rural schools (which is especially linked to girls' education), and substandard school facilities all account for low enrollment. Furthermore, nearly half of all schools do not have a building or facilities.

== Education for female students ==
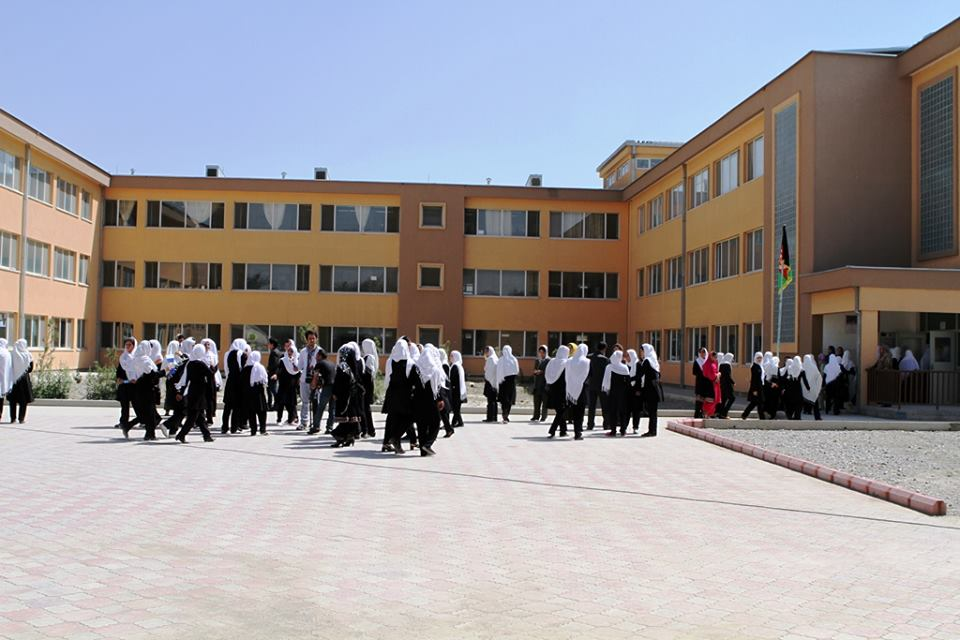
Female students at a public school in Kabul

Modern social reform for Afghan women began when Queen Soraya, wife of King Amanullah, made rapid reforms to improve women's lives and their position in the family, marriage, education and professional life. She founded the first women's magazine (Irshad-e Naswan, 1922), the first women's organization (Anjuman-i Himayat-i-Niswan), the first school for girls (Masturat School in 1920), the first theatre for women in Paghman and the first hospital for women (the Masturat Hospital in 1924). In 1928, Amanullah sent fifteen female graduates of the Masturat middle school, daughters of the royal family and government officials, to study in Turkey. Soraya Tarzi was the only woman to appear on the list of rulers in Afghanistan, and was credited with having been one of the first and most powerful Afghan and Muslim female activists. However, Queen Soraya, along with her husband's, advocacy of social reforms for women led to a protest and contributed to the ultimate demise of her and her husband's reign in 1929. King Amanullah Khan's deposition caused a severe backlash, the girls 'schools were closed, the female students who had been allowed to study in Turkey was recalled to Afghanistan and forced to put on the veil and enter purdah again, and polygamy for men was reintroduced.

Successors Mohammed Nadir Shah and Mohammed Zahir Shah acted more cautiously, but nevertheless worked for the moderate and steady improvement of women's rights Women were allowed to take classes at the Masturat Women's Hospital in Kabul in 1931, and some girls' schools were reopened; the first High School for girls was officially called a 'Nursing School' to prevent any opposition to it.

After the Second World War modernization reforms were seen as necessary by the government, which resulted in the resurrection of a state women's movement. In 1946 the government-supported Women's Welfare Association (WWA) was founded with Queen Humaira Begum as patron, giving school classes for girls and vocational classes to women, and from 1950 women students were accepted at the Kabul University.

Students of every gender and ethnic background were enrolled in public schools. By 1978, women made up 40 percent of the doctors and 60 percent of the teachers at Kabul University; 440,000 female students were enrolled in educational institutions and 80,000 more in literacy programs. Despite improvements, a large percentage of the population remained illiterate. Not only was the constitution of the government styled after that of the Soviet Union, but also changes in academia started to resemble the Soviet approach to education. However, during the Taliban's first period of rule (1996–2001), girls could not receive formal education.

In 2015 at Kabul University the first master's degree course in gender and women's studies in Afghanistan began.

When the Taliban returned to power there were concerns that access to education, especially for the female population, would be heavily set back. Though the Taliban claimed that it respected their rights. An issue later began that resulted in temporary suspension of females attending schools. This move would later be criticized by some Pakistani clerics. As of August 2022, teenage girls and female teachers are still prevented from returning to secondary schools. They are also developing a new curriculum for all students. On the 20 December 2022, women were banned from University education.

A lack of women teachers was another issue that concerned some parents, especially in more conservative areas. Some parents were not allowing their daughters to be taught by men. But this often meant that girls were not allowed to attend school, as the international aid agency Oxfam reported in 2007 that about one quarter of Afghan teachers were women.

On 20 December 2022, the Taliban banned women from attending universities in Afghanistan, sparking protests and international condemnation. This decision followed the exclusion of girls from secondary schools since the Taliban came to power the previous year. The United Nations and several countries condemned the move. In 2023, the Taliban arrested female education campaigner Matiullah Wesa after he traveled to remote parts of the country to improve access to education for all children. The Taliban previously arrested another outspoken critic of the ban on women's education Ismail Mashal in February, but he was released from custody on March 5.

Despite the ban, six provinces, Balkh, Kunduz, Jowzjan, Sar-I-Pul, Faryab, and the Daikundi provinces still allow girl's schools from grade 6 and up.

In December 2023, investigations were being held by the United Nations on the claim that Afghan girls of all ages were allowed to study at religious schools.

== Challenges to education development ==
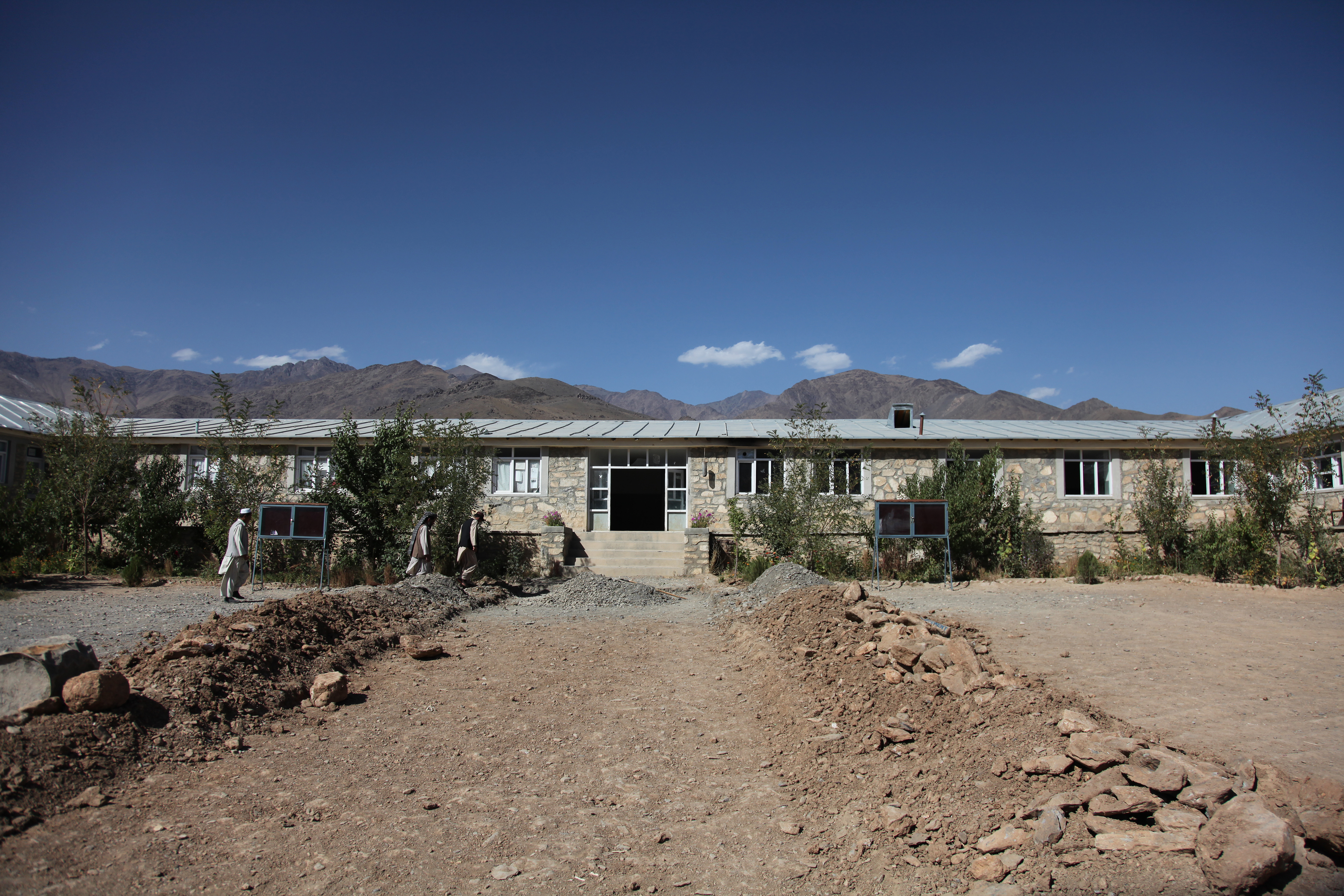
A school in Jalrez, in the Wardak province of Afghanistan is in the final stage of construction on September 30, 2009.

=== Violence and sexual abuse ===
Afghanistan has been one of the countries worst affected by violence against educational institutions, with 770 incidents of attacks on education in 2008. Violence against students prevented nearly 5 million Afghan children from attending school in 2010. The country saw 439 teachers, education employees, and students killed between 2006 and 2009, one of the highest death rates in the world.

Women were fearful of attending institutions of primary, secondary, or tertiary education as a result of increased rates of sexual harassment and violence. According to the Ministry of Public Health in Afghanistan, these occurrences have resulted in significantly higher rates of suicide, as the number of casualties exceed the number of war deaths. Evidently, not only is the physical health of women threatened by instances of sexual assault, but also their mental well-being, as many become depressed and suffer from low self-esteem.

=== Teacher credentials ===
Since 2002, up to 6 million girls and boys started attending school. In 2012, the supply of students far exceeded the pool of qualified teachers. According to statistics provided by the Ministry of Education, 80 percent of the country's 165,000 teachers had achieved the equivalent of a high school education or did not complete their post-secondary studies.

In addition to the aforementioned limitations in the adequacy of educators who are available to provide an effective education for the Afghan population, the current government continues to place bans on female teachers that would inhibit them from participating. This regulation is founded upon the Islamic interpretation of Sharia law that requires women to be accompanied by a Mehram, or male relative such as their father, husband, or son, when present in public. Firing thousands of female teachers not only makes it more difficult for women to feel comfortable attending educational institutions, but also strengthens gendered stereotypes that characterize women as being sensitive and weak, and therefore, unable to be active members of society.

=== Curriculum ===
Since 2002, under the combined efforts of Afghan and international experts, the curriculum has been changed from Islamic teachings; there are new books and better training. Yet, there remains no standard curriculum for secondary school textbooks, and high school textbooks remain woefully inadequate in number and content. The current government of Afghanistan stated repeatedly that students must be taught according to Islamic law, without elaborating on what that entails. The government reassured the public, as well as the international community, that it will reopen schools in rural and urban areas to both male and female students. Nonetheless, there has been a suspension of such efforts as officials in charge of education claim to be waiting for the development of new curriculum that will focus less on secular subjects, such as mathematics or science, and rather on Islamic studies. Furthermore, the educators responsible for operating educational institutions lack the formal training to teach advanced curriculum in schools, discouraging families from ensuring their children ultimately earn degrees with which they may enter the labor force.

=== Infrastructure ===
In 2012, there were insufficient schools. Around 4,500 schools are being built according to a recent government report. 40 percent of schools were housed in permanent buildings. The rest held classes in UNICEF shelters or were "desert schools" with students and teachers gathering in the desert near a village.

=== Child labor ===
In 2007, more than half of the population of Afghanistan was under the age of 18. UNICEF estimates that close to a quarter of Afghan children between the ages of seven and fourteen were working. In rural areas, the problem is worse, and there are more girls working than boys. This disrupts children's education and possibly prevents them from attending school completely. The number of working children has increased recently. According to a Save the Children report, an estimated one million children are currently involved in child labor in Afghanistan as family finances have collapsed in the last six months.

== See also ==
- List of universities in Afghanistan
- List of libraries in Afghanistan
- Higher education in Afghanistan
- List of schools in Afghanistan
- Afghanistan Scout Association
- Help Afghan School Children Organization
- Arrest of Barbie and Peter Reynolds
