= Abas Basir =

Afghan academic and politician

Abas Basir عباس بصیر
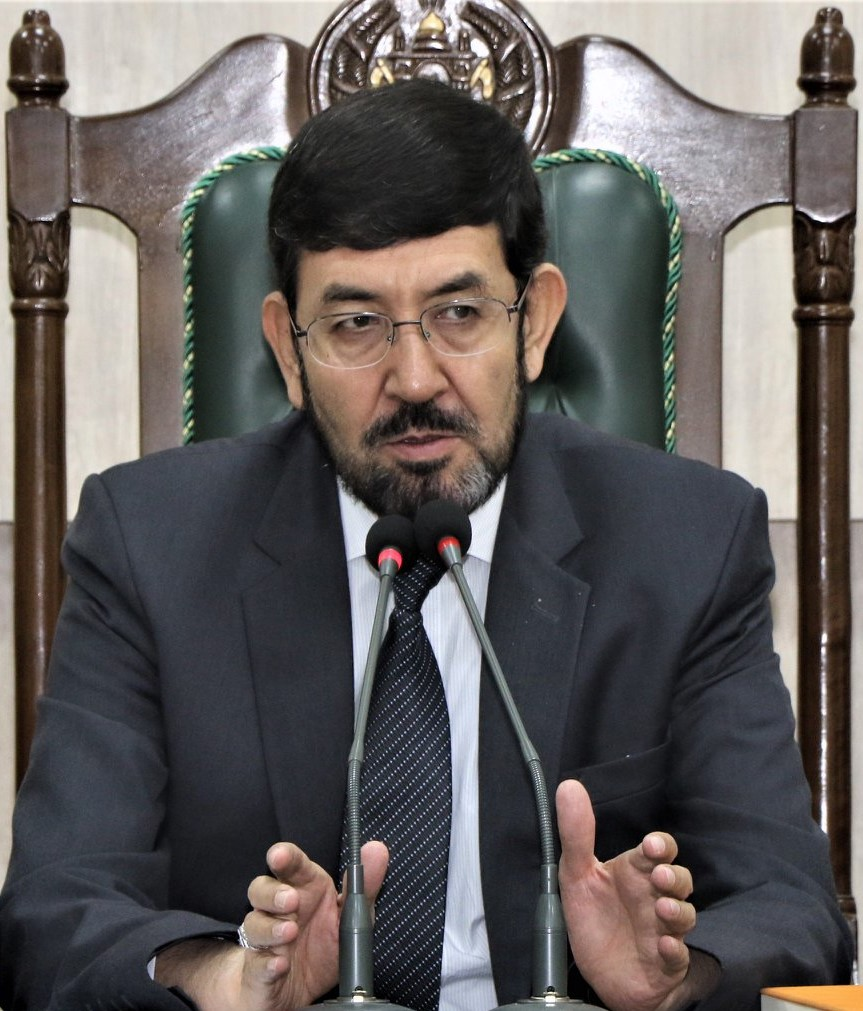

Minister of Higher Education
- In office 14 September 2020 – 15 August 2021
- Preceded by: Abdul Tawab Bala Karzai
- Succeeded by: Abdul Baqi Haqqani (acting)

General director of South Asia Co-operative Environment Programme
- In office 8 August 2018 – 13 September 2020
- Preceded by: Muhammad Khurshid

Senior Advisor of Afghan President Mohammad Ashraf Ghani
- In office 2015–2018
- President: Ashraf Ghani

Chief of Staff to the Vice President Office (Karim Khalili)
- In office 2012–2014
- President: Hamid Karzai

Deputy director general, National Environmental protection Agency (NEPA).
- In office 2010–2012

First Secretary Embassy of Afghanistan, New Delhi, India
- In office 2005–2009

Personal details
- Born: 1968 (age 57–58) Qarabagh, Ghazni, Kingdom of Afghanistan
- Party: Hezb-e Wahdat
- Education: PhD in International Environment Law From Jawaharlal Nehru University, New Delhi, India.

Abas Basir (Dari: عباس بصیر; born 1968) is an Afghan academic and politician who served as the Minister of Higher Education from 14 September 2020 to 15 August 2021. He also held various significant national and international posts. He has served as Director General of South Asia Co-operative Environment Programme (SACEP) who was nominated by the Government of Islamic Republic of Afghanistan for a term of three years, from August 2018 to September 2020. Dr. Abas Basir was also appointed as Deputy for South Asia Neutregeon Hub between the years 2019–2020.

From 2015–2018 he served as higher adviser to the Afghan president Ashraf Ghani. Before that from 2012 to 2014 he served as chief of staff to the Afghan vice president. He also served as deputy director general, National Environmental protection Agency from 2010 to 2012. Also worked as acting director of International Cultural Relations Directorate in the Ministry of Foreign Affairs (Afghanistan). And along with the mentioned positions, Abas Basir has always tried to support higher education in Afghanistan: he served as a lecturer for almost 7 years, from 2011 to 2018, at both master's and undergraduate levels, teaching environmental sciences and water management studies at different universities in Afghanistan, such as Kateb, Dawat, Ibn e Sina, Dunya University of Afghanistan, Gharjestan and Gawharshad.

Abas Basir is a well-known Afghan Diplomat who has Master of International law and Ph.D. in international environment law from Jawaharlal Nehru University, India. During 2006–2009 that Basir worked as First Deputy for the Afghanistan Embassy in New Delhi. He has also held position as Deputy and Head of cultural affairs department at the Ministry of Foreign Affairs between the years 2003–2006. Worked as a vice president for the Afghanistan National Constitution in Tehran, Iran, and as a senior representative from Ghazni Province for the Afghanistan LoyeJerga (National Assembly). Abas Basir is also nationally recognized as a writer and editor in chief for the Musharekat E Meli (National Cooperation) weekly Magazine between the years 2002–2005 as well as Emroz e Ma (Our Time) in Peshawar, Pakistan (1996–2000).

== Early life and education ==
Abas Basir son of Ghulam Hassan was born in 1968 in the Qarabagh, Ghazni, Afghanistan. He belongs to the Hazara ethnic group. He has the following education degrees:

- Bachelor's degree in Islamic Education and science from International Centre for Islamic Studies, Iran 1992.
- Master's degree from International Center for Islamic Studies in Law and Islamic Education, Iran 2003.
- Master of International law from Jawaharlal Nehru University, New Delhi, India
- Ph.D. in International Environment Law from Jawaharlal Nehru University, New Delhi, India 2012

== Career ==
=== South Asia Co-operative Environment Program ===
It is also known as SACEP, as per the Articles of Association of the organization. SACEP is an Inter-governmental organization, established in 1982 by the Governments of South Asia to promote and support protection, management and enhancement of the environment in the region. Eight member countries, namely:

- Afghanistan
- Bangladesh
- India
- Bhutan
- Maldives
- Nepal
- Pakistan
- Sri Lanka

these countries have ratified the Articles of Association of SACEP. It is also registered with secretariat of the United Nations as a Multilateral Organization in accordance with Article 102 of the Charter of the United Nations. SACEP is also the Secretariat for the South Asian Seas Programme (SASP) which is one of the eighteen Regional Seas Programmes of United Nations Environment Programme. Government of Sri Lanka has hosted the Organization and SACEP has its secretariat in Colombo which is enlisted as a Specialized Agency under the Diplomatic Missions of the Ministry of Foreign Affairs of Sri Lanka.
Abas Basir has served as Director General of South Asia Co-operative Environment Programme (SACEP) who was nominated by the Government of Islamic Republic of Afghanistan for a term of three years. With the able leadership of Basir, the 15th Meeting of the Governing Council (GC) of SACEP and the 6th Inter-governmental Meeting of Ministers of the South Asian Seas Programme (SASP) was held from 3 – 6 November 2019 in Dhaka, Bangladesh. During the period of serving as the Director General of the organization, the partnership between The World Bank and Parley for the Oceans is historically remarkable. Under this partnership the World Bank's Board of Executive Directors approved a US$50 million Plastic free Rivers and Seas for South Asia regional project with Regional IDA Grant support of US$37 million and with US$13 million parallel financing by Parley for the Oceans to be implemented by SACEP. During this period the SACEP Strategy 2020 – 2030 was developed and approved by the Governing Council. Also, the following are the strategic documents adopted by the Governing Council of SACEP to be implemented Nationally and Regionally which was developed through a series of workshops organized by SACEP in participation of the Member States of SACEP and SASP.

- Regional Marine Litter Action Plan for South Asia
- Regional Marine and Coastal Biodiversity Strategy for the South Asian Seas Region
- A Roadmap for Sustainable Waste Management and Resources Circulation in South Asia, 2019–2030
- Roadmap towards South Asia Nitrogen Framework Policy.

Abas Basir also held various significant other posts, he served as a senior advisor to the Afghan President and was a Lecturer in environment and water management studies in Afghanistan at a variety of universities, teaching both at Masters and Undergraduate levels. He also worked as the acting director of the International Cultural Relations Directorate, Ministry of Foreign Affairs (Afghanistan), Deputy Director General of the National Environmental Protection Agency (NEPA), Afghanistan and Chief of Staff at the Afghan Vice President Office. He has also served as an Afghan Diplomat. As a highly pragmatic individual with the ability to take initiatives in resolving problems, he balances professional and personal development through reflective practice.
During this time and before, he had also experienced working with civil society organizations particularly those involved in environment protection activities. He authored many publications in the fields of environment law and policy. One of his published books on environment law is now used as a text book by the universities as well as CSOs in Afghanistan. During his career, he was mostly involved in developing and applying environmental law and policy and also public awareness.
During and before joining SACEP, Abas Basir has participated in many national and international conferences and workshops. He has attended the following United Nations Climate Change conference COP and some other Conferences:

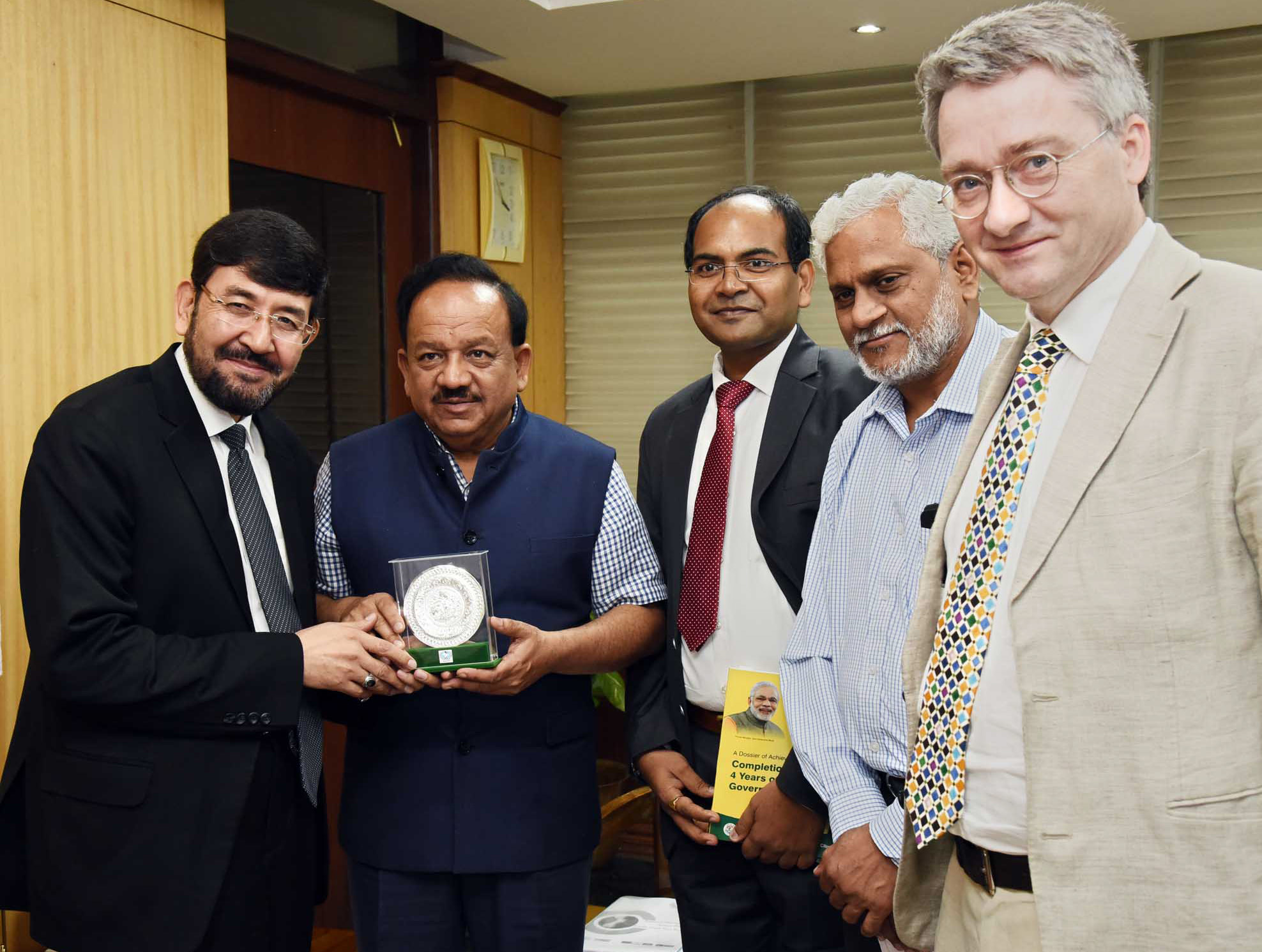
Dr. Abas Basir meeting the Union Minister for Science & Technology, Earth Sciences and Environment, Forest & Climate Change, Dr. Harsh Vardhan

- UNFCCC COP 25
- UNFCCC COP 24, Katowice
- UNFCCC COP 16, as the Head of Afghan Delegation.
- UNFCCC COP 15.
- UNFCCC COP 12.
- BONN Climate Change Talks, 2–6 Aug 2010, Bonn, Germany.
- BONN Climate Change Talks, 31 May-11 June 2010, Bonn, Germany.
- South Asian Association for Regional Cooperation(SAARC) second Inter-Governmental Expert Group Meeting. March 2010, Kathmandu.
- South Asian Association for Regional Cooperation(SAARC) First Inter-Governmental Expert Group Meeting. January 2010, New Delhi.
- South Asian Association for Regional Cooperation(SAARC) Environment Ministers Eight Meeting, Oct 2009, New Delhi.
- participated at IOCINDO-VII, Hyderabad, India June 2019.
- Third sub-Regional workshop on Preparation of status Report and sub-regional Roadmap for Implementing the Global Waste Management Goals toward Addressing SDGs in South Asia.

== Publication ==
=== Books ===
Basir has many publications in the field of environment law and policy. now one of his books is used as a textbook in different universities and CSOs.

- Liability for Environmental Damage with Special Reference to Armed Conflicts
- Legal Framework for environment protection during Armed Conflict
- Integrated Environment Management from the International law prospective.
- Elections of the Constitutional Loya Jirga
- Election Management with a view on the International and Afghanistan Experiences.

=== Articles ===
- Environmental consequences of corona outbreak.
- Trade and Environment.
- Climate Change, Impacts and Remedies
- Islam and Environment.
- Climate Change Financial Mechanism.
- Us Exit from Paris Agreement.
- World Efforts to Rescue The Earth.
- Designing a Sustainable City.

And more than 200 other Articles.
