= Al-Beroni University =

University in Kohistan, Afghanistan

Coordinates: 35°7′36.6″N 69°19′3.3″E

Alberoni University
- د البیروني پوهنتون / دانشگاه البیرونی
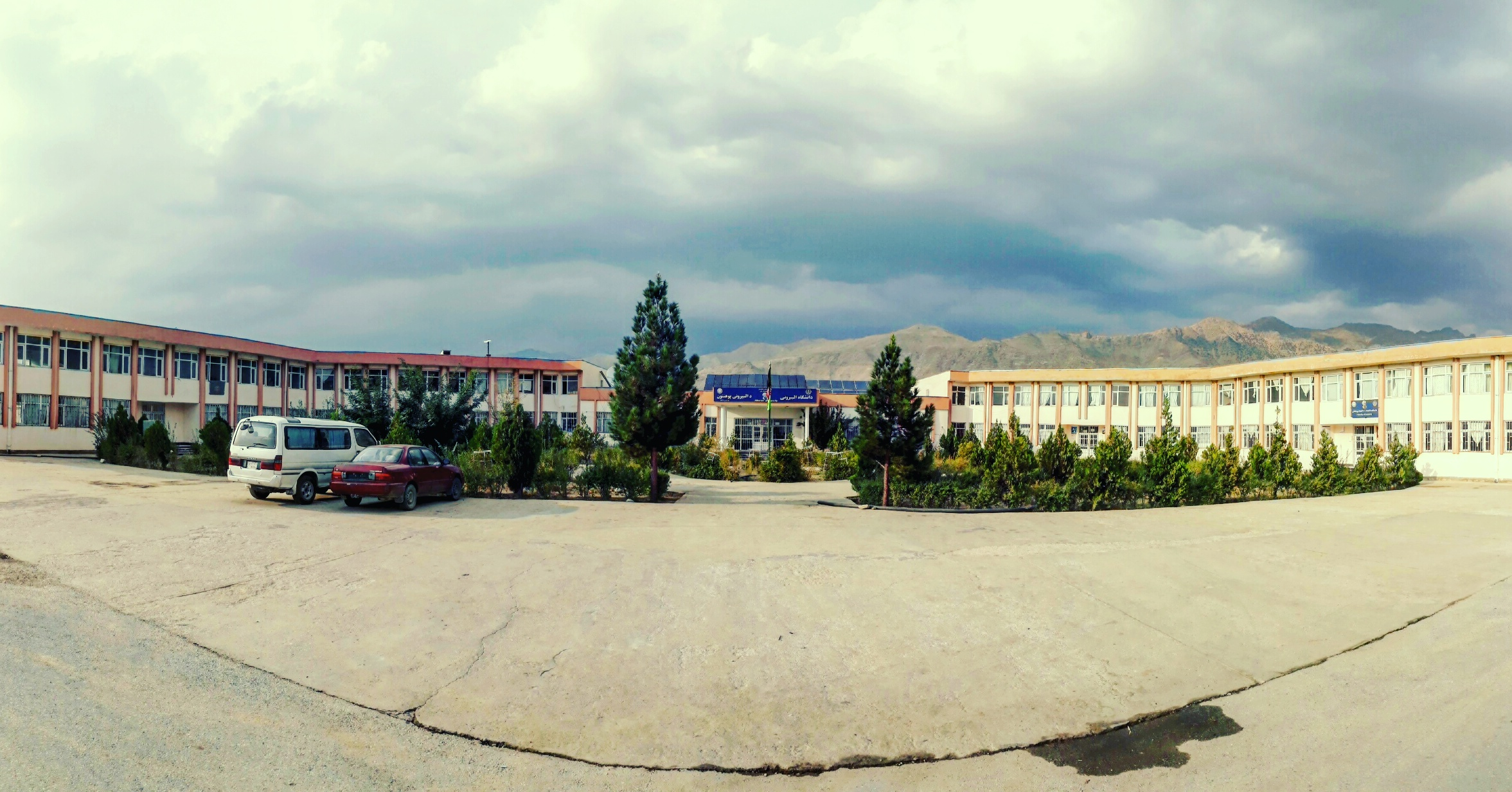
- Other name: AU
- Motto: Excellence in education to Afghanistan
- Type: Public University
- Established: 1998
- Academic affiliations: Kabul University
- Chancellor: Abdul Qahar "Sarwari"
- Vice-Chancellor: Faraidoon Karimi
- Dean: 9
- Academic staff: 147
- Students: 4682
- Undergraduates: 4682
- Location: Kohistan No. 1st District, Kapisa, Kapisa, Afghanistan
- Colors: Black, red, & green
- Website: www.au.edu.af

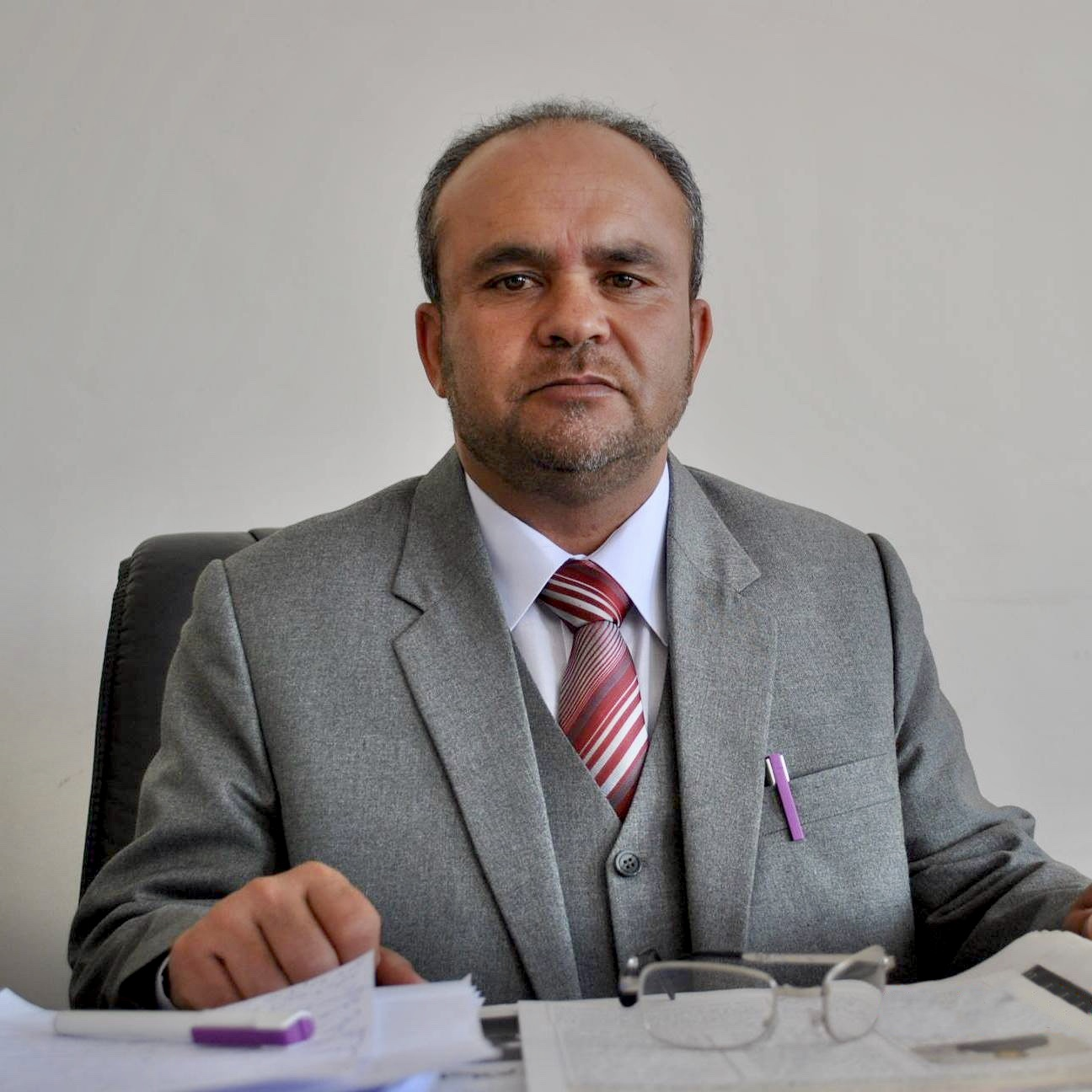
8th chancellor of Alberoni University

Alberoni University (Note: Pashto: د البیروني پوهنتون Dari: دانشگاه البیرونی) (AU) is located in the small town of Kohistan (population range of under 2,500 inhabitants), Kapisa Province, Afghanistan, about 70 km north of the capital Kabul. Alberoni University is a public institute of higher education, and was inaugurated in 1998 by the Afghan Ministry of Higher Education,Alberoni University (AU) is a very small (uniRank enrollment range: 1000-1999 students) coeducational Afghan higher education institution. The university is named after Abu Rayhan Alberuni, a renowned polymath scholar who lived in the 11th century. Alberoni University (AU) offers courses and programs leading to officially recognized higher education degrees in several areas of study. The AU beginning with a faculty of Medical and Engineering. It is the fifth largest university in Afghanistan after Kabul University, Nangarhar University, Balkh University and Herat University. The university has 9 faculties and 32 departments. The most popular fields of study is law, medicine and engineering.

Dr. Abu Najam Niazi is tenth and current chancellor of university.

== Faculties and Departments ==
Alberoni University has 9 faculties and 32 departments; students study in different faculties and fields. Right now Alberoni University has 147 faculty members and 4682 students.

Alberoni University faculties

1. Faculty of Medicine (Dean of Faculty: Associated professor Dr. Najeebullah Shafaq)

- Lecturers:
  1. Department of General Medicine (HoD: Asst. prof. Dr. Abdul Moid Kohistani)
  2. Department of General Surgery
  3. Department of Paraclinical
  4. Dr. Aliseena Yussufpur, (Master of Science), Assistant Professor, Department of Biochemistry, Faculty of Medicine
  5. Dr. Ahmad Mustafa Rahimi, (Master of Physiology), Assistant Professor , Department of Physiology, Faculty of Medicine
  6. Dr Mohammad Hussein Rustampur, (Master of Microbiology), Assistant Professor, Department of Microbiology, Faculty of Medicine
  7. Dr.Mahbobullah Halimi, Assistant Professor, Department of Histology, Faculty of Medicine
  8. Dr. Sarwar Khalid, Assistant Professor, Department of Pharmacology, Faculty of Medicine
  9. Dr Jamshid Tawana, Assistant Professor, Department of Anatomy, Faculty of Medicine
  10. Dr. Abdul Qahar Masror, Assistant Professor, Department of General Surgery, Faculty of Medicine
  11. Dr. Hasibullah Ayami, Assistant Professor, Department of General Surgery, Faculty of Medicine
  12. Dr. Abdul Hasib Azaraksh, Assistant Professor, Department of General Medicine, Faculty of Medicine
  13. Dr.Masih Kohistani, Assistant Professor, Department of Ophthalmology, Faculty of Medicine
  14. Dr. Abdul Basheer Bashari, Assistant Professor, Department of Tuberculosis and Infectious Diseases, Faculty of Medicine
  15. Dr. Homayon Jahanyar, Assistant Professor, Department of Anesthesiology, Faculty of Medicine
  16. Dr. Ehsanullah Ehsan, Assistant Professor, Department of Skin and Venereal Disease, Faculty of Medicine
  17. Dr. Enayatullah, Assistant Professor, Department of Internal Medicine, Faculty of Medicine

In2. Faculty of Engineering (Dean of Faculty: Assct. Prof.Engr.Mateen Haqbeen)

- Departments:
  1. Department of Electrical and Electronic Engineering (HoD: Asst. Prof. Engr. Yasir Hamwar)
  2. Department of Civil Engineering (HoD: Asst. Prof.Dr.Hasibullah Jahish)

3. Faculty of Education (Dean of Faculty: Ascot. Prof. Qadir Wahab)

- Departments:
  1. Department of Mathematics
  2. Department of Physics
  3. Department of Chemistry
  4. Department of History
  5. Department of Geography
  6. Department of Islamic Studies
  7. Department of Biology
- 4. Faculty of Economics (Acting Dean of Faculty: Prof.Dr.Naim Sharif, Ph.D.)

5. Faculty of Law and Political Science (Dean of Faculty: Ascot. Bismillah Mateen)

- Departments:
  1. Department of International Relations
  2. Department of Public Law
  3. Department of Private Law
  4. Department of Criminal Law

6. Faculty of Literature (Dean of Faculty: Ascot.Prof.)

- Departments:
  1. Department of Farsi Language
  2. Department of Pashto Language
  3. Department of English Language
  4. Department of Arabic Language

7. Faculty of Journalism

- Departments:
  1. Department of Press
  2. Department of Radio & TV

8. Faculty of Agriculture (Dean of Faculty: Ascot. Prof.FazelRab Aria)

  1. Department of Horticulture Sciences
  2. Department of Agriculture Economics
  3. Department of Plant Sciences
  4. Department of Animal Sciences]

9. Faculty of Sharia Law (Dean of Faculty: Prof. Dr. Rafe Alimi, Ph.D.)

== Students statistics in 2015 ==
No.	Faculty	Male	Female	Total
1	Faculty of Engineering	480	5	485
2	Faculty of Medical	111	xx	xx
3	Faculty of Law & Political Science	xxx	6	238
4	Faculty of Economics	92	48	140
5	Faculty of Journalism	307	90	397
6	Faculty of Sharia Law	xx	156	xx
7	Faculty of Education	xxx	1232	2510
8	Faculty of Agriculture	616	65	xxx
9	Faculty of Literature	100	122	222
	Total	xxx	xxx	xxx

Alberoni University has 9 faculties with about 32 Departments. AU has a campus, buildings for its 3 faculties, laboratories for Medical, Engineering and Education faculties, libraries, lecture rooms and lecturers.

== Notable people ==
- Abdul Malik Hamwar, ex-minister of Ministry of Rural Rehabilitation and Development from December 2001 - July 2002.

== Controversy over Chancellor of University Selection ==
According to Civil Higher Education Law of Afghanistan which published in Official Gazette No. 1195 on November 11, 2015 The head of the institute of higher education in Afghanistan should be selected from high academic rank members of faculty of the institute, if they have the academic rank of professor, professor, etc. through free, secret and direct elections to the majority of vote of academic members of that institute of higher education for a period of three years. However, since 2001 it is selected by President of Afghanistan. In 2021, the chancellor of Al-Biruni University resigned from his position due to threats from Taliban fighters. He previously sent a complaint letter about the threatening behavior of the representative Abdul Baqi Haqqani to Ministry of Higher Education.

== International Partner universities ==
The cooperation, especially with Iranian universities is more focused for faculty exchange and networking. In 2016, the university signed a partnership with University of Mazandaran to promote faculty exchange and networking.

- (Iran) University of Mazandaran

== See also ==
- List of universities in Afghanistan
