= Logar University =

University in Puli Alam, Afghanistan

- پوهنتون لوگر / د لوگر پوهنتون
- Established: 2015
- President: Mufti Seyyed Zia-ul-Ahmad Sarem
- Location: Puli Alam, Logar province, Afghanistan
- Website: logu.edu.af

Logar University (Pashto: د لوگر پوهنتون, Dari: پوهنتون لوگر) is a public university in Puli Alam, which is the capital of Logar Province in eastern Afghanistan. The university was established in March of 2015 by the government during the Islamic Republic of Afghanistan. Mufti Seyyed Zia-ul-Ahmad Sarem serves as the university's president.

As of August 2025, Logar University is witnessing a major expansion of its roads and greenspace areas, which is funded by Afghanistan's Ministry of Higher Education.

== See also ==
- List of universities in Afghanistan
