= Higher education in Afghanistan =

Higher education in Afghanistan, including post-secondary education, known locally as third-level or tertiary education, falls under the Ministry of Higher Education which establishes government policies to reform higher education at Afghan universities.

== Overview ==
The rate of participation in higher education in Afghanistan is lower than that of many neighboring countries due to various issues that impact overall education in Afghanistan. According to statistics from UNESCO, the adult literacy rate was 38% in 2015, with less than 10% of students completing their secondary education.

Afghan scientists produced just 1.4 publications per million inhabitants in 2014, according to Thomson Reuters' Web of Science (Science Citation Index Expanded), the lowest ratio in South Asia. The world average was 176 per million. However, the number of Afghan articles cataloged in this international database increased from seven to 44 between 2005 and 2014. Some 96.5% of articles produced between 2008 and 2014 had a foreign co-author. Most partners were based in the United States (97 articles), followed by the United Kingdom (52), Pakistan (29), Egypt, and Japan (26 each). Afghan articles were the most highly cited of any country in South Asia, with 9.7% of them featuring among the 10% most cited articles worldwide, compared to a G20 average of 10.2%. A high citation rate is common for countries producing a very small volume of scientific publications.

Of the publications produced by Afghan scientists between 2008 and 2014, 114 (59%) of those cataloged in Thomson Reuters' Web of Science concerned medical sciences and 33 biological sciences. There were ten articles about agriculture, five about chemistry, and two about engineering.

The end of the war in Afghanistan in August 2021 and the Islamic Republic of Afghanistan's loss of control over the country to the Taliban had a negative impact on higher education, as universities were closed and academics were left without governmental support or funding. These conditions led to many researchers attempting to leave the country so they could continue their research.

On January 13, 2022, Abdul Baqi Haqqani, the Higher Education Minister of Afghanistan, announced that universities would reopen, but did not state a definitive timeframe for reopening. Among the issues facing the Taliban's reopening of schools, lack of funding and planning were listed.

== Educational reforms: 2008–2014 ==
Higher education was one of the eight pillars of the Afghan National Development Strategy for 2008–2014. In December 2009, the Afghan Ministry of Higher Education launched the National Higher Education Strategic Plan: 2010–2014. Its two main goals were to improve quality and broaden access to higher education, with an emphasis on gender equity. One of the responses to the destruction of the higher education system has been the planned effort in the Afghan Ministry of Higher Education's (MoHE) National Higher Education Strategic Plan: 2010–2014 (MoHE 2009c) to not only rebuild the system that remained in 2001 but also transform it into a modern, merit-based system.

The National Higher Education Strategic Plan: 2010–2014 was the outcome of a series of consultation workshops with Afghan universities undertaken by the Ministry of Higher Education in 2009 with support from UNESCO and the World Bank. The National Higher Education Strategic Plan: 2010–2014 was built on an earlier framework for the reform of higher education developed by the Ministry of Higher Education with the support of UNESCO's International Institute for Educational Planning in 2004. The earlier reform had covered a wide spectrum, including the institutional structure of universities, questions of governance, recruitment and retention of staff and students, the relationship between teaching and research, management, finance, and the procurement of equipment, land, and textbooks.

=== Financial issues ===
According to the National Higher Education Strategic Plan: 2010–2014, higher education was to represent 20% of the country's educational budget by 2015, equivalent to US$800 per student by 2014 and US$1,000 by 2015. The approved budget for 2012 for higher education was US$47.1 million, equivalent to US$471 per student. By 2014, only 15% (US$84.13 million) of the US$564 million in funding requested by donors by the Ministry of Higher Education had materialized since 2010. The main donors were the World Bank, USAID, the US State Department, the North Atlantic Treaty Organization, India, France, and Germany.

A major goal of the Ministry of Higher Education is to grant some financial autonomy to universities, which as of 2015 were not entitled to charge tuition fees or keep any income. The ministry cites a 2005 World Bank study of Pakistan, which repealed similar restrictive legislation about a decade ago. According to the ministry, Pakistani universities earn an average of 49% of their budget (with some as high as 60%) from income and donations.

The aim of the reform is to foster entrepreneurship, university-industry ties, and the universities' capacity to provide services. The ministry has prepared a proposal that would allow higher education institutions to keep funds that they earn from entrepreneurial activities, such as drug analysis done by the Faculty of Pharmacy at Kabul University for the Ministry of Public Health. They would also be able to keep income from night courses and donations from benefactors and alumni. In addition, they would be entitled to set up foundations that could accumulate funds for major projects. The ministry's position was vindicated by the outcome of a pilot project implemented in 2012 which gave universities in Kabul greater authority over procurement and expenditure below a certain financial threshold. The ministry's plans have been put on hold, however, by the failure of parliament to pass the Higher Education Law, which was approved by the Education Committee in 2012.

=== Impact on enrollment ===
The Ministry of Higher Education has largely surpassed its target for raising university enrollment, which doubled between 2011 and 2014 to 153,314. The government had projected the number of students doubling to 115,000 by 2015. A shortfall in funding has prevented the construction of facilities from keeping pace with the rapid rise in student rolls, however. There were still no functioning laboratories for physics students at Kabul University in 2013.

According to a progress report by the Ministry of Higher Education, the number of female students tripled between 2008 and 2014 to 30,467, yet female still represented just one in five university students. Part of the growth in university student rolls can be attributed to 'night school', which extends access to workers and young mothers. There were 16,198 students enrolling in 2014, compared to just 6,616 two years earlier. Women represented 12% (1,952) of those attending evening classes in 2014.

=== Impact on quality of education ===
By 2014, the Curriculum Commission established by the Ministry of Higher Education had approved the curricular reviews and upgrades for one-third of Afghanistan's public and private faculties. Progress in meeting recruitment goals has also been steady since staffing is covered by the regular budget allocations. One of the ministry's priorities has been to increase the number of master's programs. This will broaden opportunities for women, in particular, given the difficulties they face in going abroad for master's and PhD training. For instance, half of the students enrolled in the two new master's programs in education and public administration in 2013 were women. Five of the eight master's degrees granted by Kabul University between 2007 and 2012 were also obtained by women. By 2015, a total of 25 master's programs were available.

In 2008, 5.2% of the 2,526 faculty members at Afghan universities held a PhD, 30.1% a master's degree, and 63.8% a bachelor's degree. One priority of the Ministry of Education has been to increase the share of faculty and augment the number of those who hold a master's degree or PhD. The wider choice of academic programs has enabled more faculty to obtain a master's degree but doctoral students still need to study abroad, in order to increase the small pool of PhDs in Afghanistan. The share of master's and PhD-holders has dropped in recent years, as the number of faculty members at Afghan universities has risen. The drop in the share of PhD-holders from 5.2% to 3.8% between 2008 and 2014 was also due to a wave of retirement. By October 2014, there were 5,006 faculty members. Some 1,480 of them held a master's degree (29.6% of the total) and 192 a PhD (3.8%). A further 625 faculty were expected to graduate with a master's degree by December 2015.

Two schemes enable faculty to study abroad. Between 2005 and 2013, 235 faculty members completed their master's degree abroad, thanks to the World Bank's Strengthening Higher Education Programme. In 2013 and 2014, the Ministry of Higher Education's development budget funded the study abroad of 884 faculty working towards their master's degrees and 37 faculty enrolled in doctoral programs.

Afghan students may apply for a scholarship to complete their master's degree or Ph.D. at the South Asian University in India, which offers subsidized tuition fees to all students from the member countries of the South Asian Association for Regional Cooperation. In February 2016, the Afghan Students Alumni ran a seminar at Avicenna University in Kabul on academic opportunities for MA and PhD Programs at the South Asian University.

=== Women in higher education ===
Within its Higher Education Gender Strategy (2013), the Ministry of Higher Education has developed an action plan to augment the number of women students and faculty. A pillar of this plan is the construction of women's dormitories. With help from the US State Department, one was completed in Herat in 2014 and another two are planned for Balkh and Kabul. They should house about 1,200 women in total. The ministry also requested funds from the National Priority Programme budget for the construction of ten additional dormitories for 4,000 women students; six of these were completed in 2013.

According to the targets outlined in the Higher Education Gender Strategy (2013), women were to represent 25% of university students by 2014 and 30% by 2015. By 2014, they accounted for 19.9% of students, down from 20.5% in 2010. Female enrollment has accelerated since 2010 but male enrollment has progressed faster. Girls still encounter more difficulties than boys in completing their schooling and are penalized by the lack of university dormitories for women. In 2012, there was a net intake of 66% of girls and 89% of boys at the level of primary education. Boys could expect to complete 11 years of schooling and girls seven.

By October 2014, 117 women (23% of the total) were pursuing a master's degree at Afghan universities, compared to 508 men.

The Higher Education Gender Strategy fixes a target for women to make up 20% of faculty members by 2015. By October 2014, 690 faculty members were women (14%). The Strategy also advocates increasing the number of women faculty who hold a master's degree or a PhD. By October 2014, 203 women held a master's degree, compared to 1,277 men, and 10 women a PhD.

The Taliban takeover of the country also impacted women's education and employment. In October 2021, many women who had studied or instructed at Kabul's universities feared that they would not be able to return under the Taliban. As of September 2021, women and girls were still barred from enrolling in secondary education.

On January 13, 2022, Abdul Baqi Haqqani, the Higher Education Minister of Afghanistan, said that female students would be admitted to universities in segregated classes once they reopened. Later that year, the Taliban restricted which subjects women could study at university, before announcing a ban on women attending university in December with immediate effect.

== Grants ==
In order to revive Afghanistan's research culture, research units have been installed at 12 universities as part of the World Bank's Higher Education Systems Improvement Project. These are Kabul University, Kabul Polytechnic University, Herat University, Nangarhar University, Balkh University, Kandahar University, Kabul Education University, Albiruni University, Khost University, Takhar University, Bamyan University, and Jawzjan University. In parallel, the Ministry of Higher Education developed a digital library in 2011 and 2012 which provides all faculty, students and staff with access to about 9,000 academic journals and 7,000 e-books.

Participation in research is now a requirement for the promotion of faculty at every level. In the first round of competitive bidding in 2012, research grants were approved for projects proposed by faculty members from Kabul University, Bamyan University, and Kabul Education University. Projects concerned the use of IT in learning and research; challenges of the new middle school mathematics curriculum; the effect of automobile pollution on grapevines; integrated management of nutrients in wheat varieties; traditional ways of blending concrete; and the effect of different methods of collecting sperm from bulls. The research committee established at each of the 12 universities approved nine research proposals in 2013 and a further 12 in 2014.

The Ministry of Higher Education has been working with the Asian Institute of Technology in Thailand to develop joint educational programs. As part of this collaboration, 12 university faculty members were seconded to the institute in 2014.

Major support has been provided to the development of the Ministry of Higher Education and public universities through significant investments from the United States Agency for International Development (USAID) through a series of cooperative agreements. These projects include the Higher Education Program I (2006–2010) implemented by a consortium composed of the Academy for Education Development, the University of Massachusetts, and Indiana University; Higher Education Program II (2010–2013) implemented by the University of Massachusetts, and the University Support and Workforce Development Program (2014–2019) implement by FHI 360, University of Massachusetts, and Purdue University.

Work began on drafting a national research policy in 2014.

== See also ==
- Education in Afghanistan
- List of universities in Afghanistan
- Ministry of Higher Education (Afghanistan)

== Sources ==
This article incorporates text from a free content work. Licensed under CC-BY-SA IGO 3.0. Text taken from UNESCO Science Report: towards 2030, UNESCO Publishing.
