= KHSI =

KHSI may refer to:

- Hastings Municipal Airport (ICAO code KHSI)
- Kabul Health Sciences Institute, higher education in Kabul, Afghanistan
- KHSI (FM), a radio station (89.7 FM) licensed to serve Conrad, Montana, United States
- KHSI-LP, a defunct low-power radio station (97.5 FM) licensed to serve Conrad, Montana, United States
