= Hajar Abulfazl =

Afghan medical doctor, footballer, and delegate

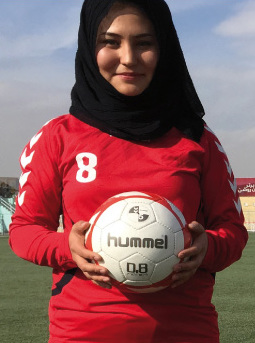
- Born: 11 November 1993 (age 32); Kabul, Afghanistan
- Occupation: Medical doctor
- Known for: Captaining Afghanistan national women's football team

Hajar Abulfazl (born 1993) is a medical doctor from Afghanistan, former captain of the Afghanistan national women's football team and former delegate to the United Nations Youth Assembly.

== Life ==
Abulfazl was born in Kabul and took up football at the age of 12. She joined the women's football team at her school. She rose to become captain of the Afghanistan national women's team and played for it for nearly ten years, from May 2009 to January 2017. She played at the South Asian Football Federation Championships in 2010 and 2012. She played in midfield and was head of the women's committee of the Afghanistan Football Federation (2012 to 2014).

In 2016, Abulfazl was an Afghan delegate to the United Nations Winter Youth Assembly. In July 2017 she was awarded the Courageous Use of Sport Award for individual bravery in the face of adversity. She has coached her country's Under-17 girls' football team.

Abulfazl had the support of her parents when she decided to become an athlete but other members of her family disapproved. She wore the hijab during her football matches to show Afghan girls and their parents that sporting achievement was not incompatible with respect for religion and culture. She has used football to empower girls in Afghanistan.

Abulfazl studied at Khatam-Al-Nabieen University, where she earned her medical degree in 2017.
