= Mirwais Neeka University =

University in Kandahar, Afghanistan

Coordinates: 31°36′54″N 65°40′30″E

- دانشگاه ميرويس نيکه / د ميرويس نيکه پوهنتون
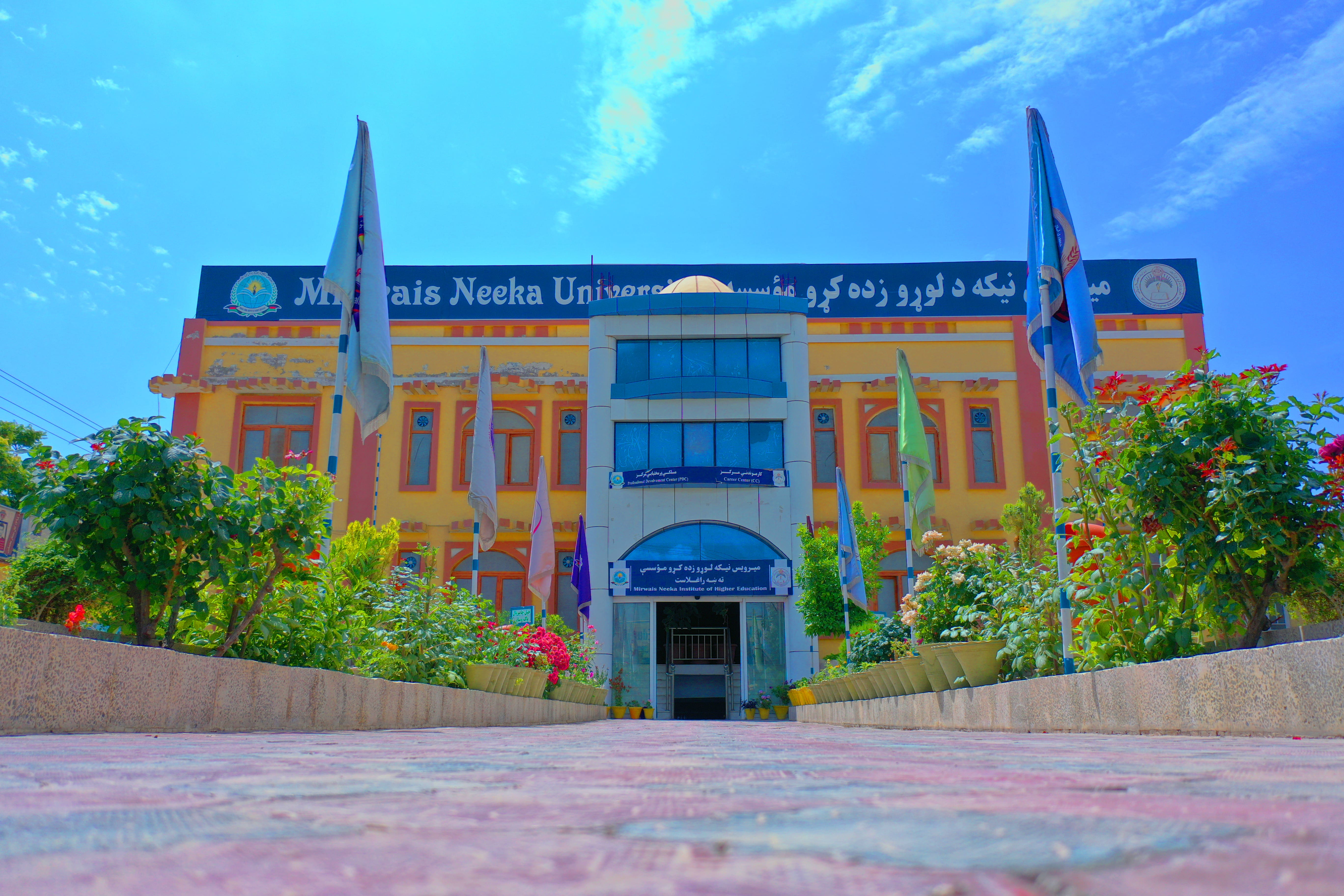
- Type: Private
- Established: 2011
- Location: Kandahar, Kandahar Province, Afghanistan

Mirwais Neeka University is a private higher education institution located in the western Shahr-e Naw area of Kandahar, Afghanistan. It is named in honor of Mirwais Hotak, founder of the Hotak dynasty at Kandahar. Students at the university can apply for three faculties such as Law and International Relations, Faculty of Economics, and Medical Faculty.

== History ==
Mirwais Neeka University was established by the Department of Private Universities and Institutions of the Ministry of Higher Education in accordance with the provisions of Article 46 of the Constitution, Chronological number 53, Registered number 536 on 12 January 2012. It started operating in Kandahar with an official license and registration.

Approximately 3,213 students in four faculties are being taught in 85 classes by 81 instructors. This amount has been increased twice. It has teaching hospitals, laboratories, and legal clinics for student training. According to the evaluation of the Quality and Accreditation Department of the Ministry of Higher Education, it has conducted the second phase of evaluation and has provided 1,386 professional cadres to the community.

== See also ==
- List of universities in Afghanistan
- Ministry of Higher Education (Afghanistan)
