= Karwan University =

University in Kabul, Afghanistan

- دانشگاه کاروان
- Motto: Hope, Leadership & Future
- Type: University
- Established: 2007
- Chancellor: Fazel udin Ayar
- Vice-Chancellor: Ismail Roshangar
- Chairman and Founder: Sayed Javed Andish
- Location: End of Kabul University Road, Kabul, Afghanistan
- Campus: Near Kabul University
- Colours: Black, Orange
- Nickname: Karwan University
- Website: karwan.edu.af

Karwan University (Dari: دانشگاه کاروان) is a degree-awarding tertiary educational institution in Kabul, Afghanistan. It was founded in 2007 and is registered with the Afghan Ministry of Higher Education. Sayed Javid Andish was Chairman of Karwan and also a majority shareholder and Chairman of Afghanistan Commercial Bank.

== History ==
Karwan University is registered with the Ministry of Higher Education of Afghanistan. In late 2009, it officially became a university. Its founder is Sayed Javed Andish, who is a businessman and Chairman of Afghanistan Universities Association and advisor of Afghanistan Chamber of Commerce and Industries.

== Departments and programs ==
Karwan University offers bachelor's degrees in business administration, economics, Law, political science, agriculture, pharmacy, journalism and computer science. It also offers Accounting courses, Diploma in Business Administration, Information Technology, English Language, Literacy, security courses and Civil Engineering.

Karwan University commenced delivery of Economics, BBA (Bachelor of Business Administration), Computer Science, Law and Political Science undergraduate courses. Karwan University was helped by foreign-educated Afghan friends and well wishers before receiving foreign recognition for this private university.

== Key people ==
- Chairman and Founder: Sayed Javed Andish
- Chancellor: NONE ATM
- Operations and Finance Vice Chancellor: Ehsanullah Khalilzoy
- Academic Vice Chancellor: NONE
- IT Manager: Nasir Zahir
- HR Manager: MAIWAND MAYAR

== See also ==
- List of universities in Afghanistan
