= Education University =

Education University may refer to:

- Baba Saheb Ambedkar Education University (West Bengal, India)
- Hemwati Nandan Bahuguna Uttarakhand Medical Education University (Uttarakhand, India)
- Education University of Hong Kong
- Kabul Education University of Rabbani (Afghanistan)
- Indonesia University of Education
- Karlsruhe University of Education (Germany)
- Ludwigsburg University of Education (Germany)
- University of Education (Lahore, Pakistan)
- University of Education, Winneba (Ghana)
- Seoul National University of Education (South Korea)
- Sultan Idris Education University (Perak, Malaysia)
- Tamil Nadu Teachers Education University (Chennai, Tamil Nadu, India)
- World Islamic Sciences and Education University
