= Amena Karimyan =

Afghani astronomer and engineer

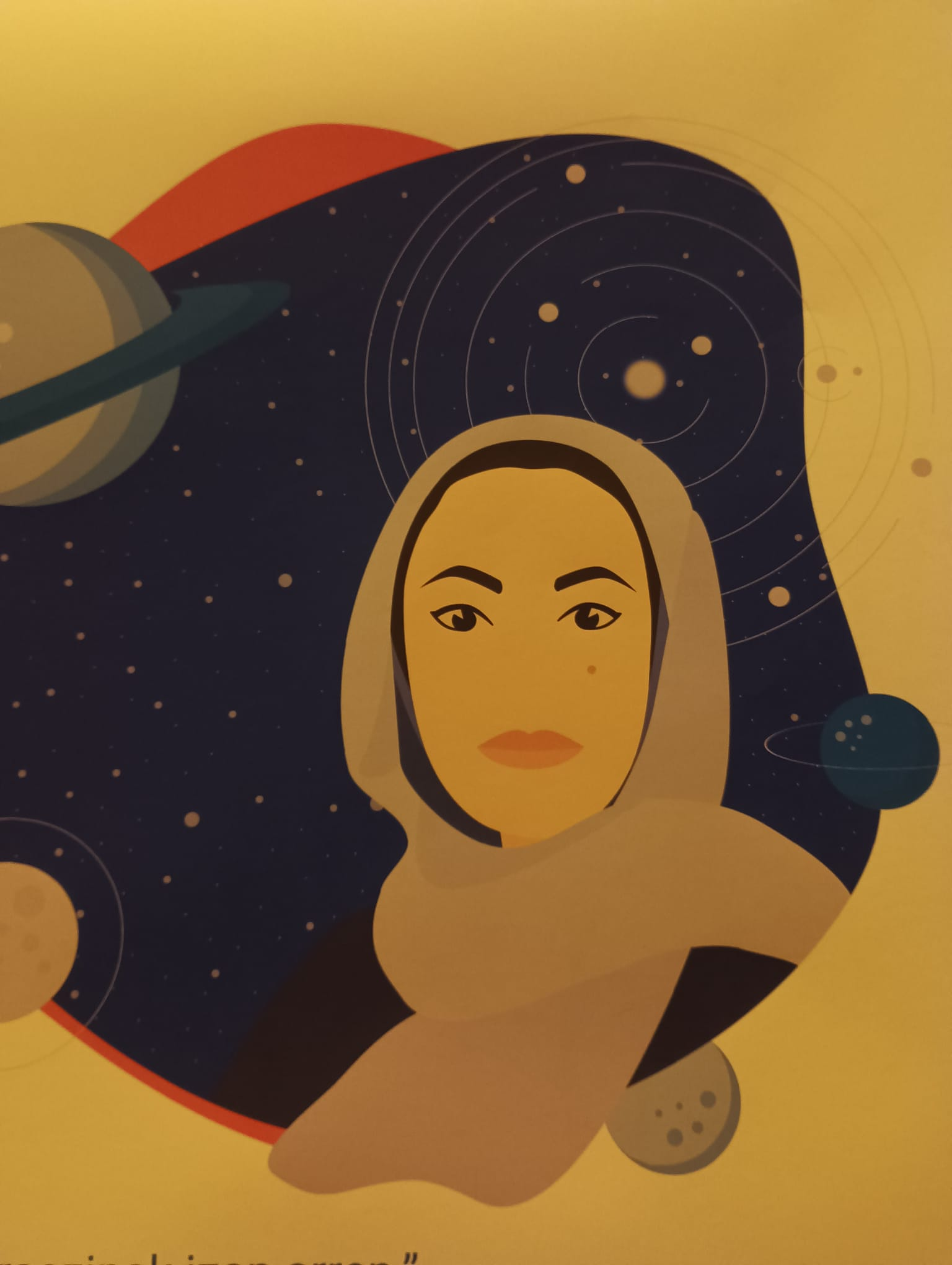
- Born: November 1, 1996 (age 29); Herāt, Afghanistan
- Education: Herat University
- Scientific career
- Fields: astronomy
- Workplaces: UN-Habitat, Kayhana Astronomical Group

Amena Karimyan (born November 1, 1996 in Herāt) is an Afghan astronomer and women's rights activist. She is also a civil engineer and founder of the Kayhana Astronomical Group, an organization that encourages young women and women in the field of astronomy. She was ranked as one of the 100 most inspiring women in the world by BBC 100 Women in 2021.

== Life ==
Karimyan was born in the Afghan city of Herat in 1996 and she became interested in astronomy. She wanted to study astronomy but there were no places to study in Afghanistan so another course had to be chosen.

She graduated in civil engineering from Herat University. She then worked as an engineer on the United Nations (UN) UN-Habitat project. In 2018, Karimyan and Sohail Karimi founded the Kayhana Astronomical Group which won the International Astronomical Union's "Telescope for All" award in 2021. It was the only group of its type and it had 150 members In the same year the Taliban took over Afghanistan and she had already been under threat so she decided to flee.

Kariyan knew that she had been granted a visa because of her scientific studies. Karimyan decided to cross the border from Afghanistan into Pakistan to go to an Austrian embassy to pick up the visa. She was beaten by the Taliban and then released. She continued on her journey and having made it to the Austrian embassy in Islamabad, she was denied a visa. The broken promise of her visa and the loss to Austria of not having her as a citizen was reported.

A group of journalists appealed to the Austrian government. The case caught the attention of the German government, which granted Karimyan a visa. In 2022 she was a refugee in Germany.

In 2022 her writing about women astronomers in Afghanistan was published in Nature Astronomy explaining how they needed support.

In July 2024 Nele Dehnenkamp completed a 30-minute documentary about Kariyan titled "Kleines Universum" (Little Universe). The film was made in Germany in Persian and it's themes include gender and social coming of age and war.
