= Jowzjan University =

University in Jowzjan, Afghanistan

- پوهنتون جوزجان / د جوزجان پوهنتون
- Type: Public University
- Chancellor: Sayed Anwar Ul Haq Habibi
- Location: Jowzjan province, Afghanistan; 36.670490°N 65.741544°E

Jowzjan University (Note: Pashto: د جوزجان پوهنتون Dari: پوهنتون جوزجان) (JU) is a university located in Jowzjan province, northern Afghanistan. Founded in 2002, Jowzjan University is a non-profit public higher-education university that is located in the beautiful city of Sheberghan, within Jowzjan province. JU also provides several academic degrees which makes it one of the more prestigious universities within Afghanistan. The total student population at the university is around 7000; they play a key role in the contribution to academic research in Afghanistan.

== Faculties of Jowzjan University ==
- Faculty of Geology and Mining
- Faculty of Civil Engineering
- Faculty of Social Science
- Faculty of Law & Political Science
- Faculty of Economics
- Faculty of Chemical Industry Engineering
- Faculty of Education
- Faculty of Geomatics
- Faculty of Theology

== See also ==
- List of universities in Afghanistan
