= Dawat University =

Private university in Kabul, Afghanistan

- دعوت پوهنتون/ دانشگاه دعوت
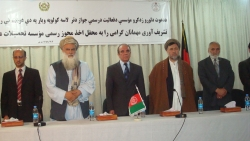
- Type: Private University
- Established: May 24, 2009
- President: Abdul Rab Rasul Sayyaf
- Location: Qamber Square, Kabul, Afghanistan; 34°31′53.6″N 69°05′19.2″E
- Website: http://www.dawat.edu.af/

Dawat University (Note: Pashto: د دعوت پوهنتون Dari: دانشگاه دعوت) is a private university registered with the government of Afghanistan. Established in 2009, Dawat University is a non-profit private higher-education institution located in the urban setting of the metropolis of Kabul (population range of 1,000,000-5,000,000 inhabitants).

Abdul Rab Rasul Sayyaf, the founder, obtained a license from the Ministry of Higher Education. In the beginning, Dawat University will be registering students to the faculties of Engineering, Law and Islamic Studies. In 2013 it has about 7000 students studying in six faculties, Shariah, Law, Engineering, Economics, Journalism and Pharmacy; the first batch of 450 students are graduated in this year.

== Overview ==
This institution also has a branch campus in Khost. Officially recognized by the Ministry of Higher Education of Afghanistan, Dawat University is a very small (enrollment range: 500-999 students) coeducational Afghan higher education institution.

== Divisions ==
- Economics Faculty
- Engineering Faculty
- Journalism Faculty
- Law and Political Sciences Faculty
- Medicine for Ladies Faculty
- Pharmacy Faculty
- Sharia Faculty

== See also ==
- List of universities in Afghanistan
