= Bakhtar Institute of Higher Education =

Private university in Kabul, Afghanistan

Bakhtar University
- دانشگاه باختر / د باختر پوهنتون
- Type: Private University
- Established: 2005
- Chancellor: Abdul Latif Roshan
- Vice-Chancellor: Waheed Rokhan
- Location: Bakhtar University, Karte-char, Kabul, Afghanistan
- Campus: Bakhtar University, Karte-char
- Website: http://www.bakhtar.edu.af

Bakhtar University (Pashto: د باختر پوهنتون, Dari: دانشگاه باختر) is an established private university in Afghanistan. It is in the capital city, Kabul. The university has developed a research and development cell and will issue its first journal, Bakhtar Journal of Advance Research, soon.

The university, for the first time in the history of Afghanistan, launched Masters programs in Business Administration and Computer Science. The university has well-qualified faculty hired mostly from Pakistan and India. Currently, the university offers MBA, MCS, BBA, BCS, BJR, BCE and LAW, and some diploma programs in the English language.

== See also ==
- List of universities in Afghanistan
