= Hara University =

Private university in Khost, Afghanistan

Hara University (Pashto: حرا پوهنتون) is a private university located in the city of Khost, southeastern Afghanistan.

== History ==
It was established in 2007.

== See also ==
- List of universities in Afghanistan
