= Farah University =

University in Farah, Afghanistan

- پوهنتون فراه / د فراه پوهنتون
- Type: Public
- Established: 2012
- Chancellor: Maulvi Samiullah Haqqani
- Location: Farah, Afghanistan
- Website: farau.edu.af/en

Farah University (Note: Pashto: د فراه پوهنتون Dari: پوهنتون فراه) is a public university in Farah, which is the capital of Farah Province in western Afghanistan. The university was established in September 2012. Its current chancellor is Maulvi Samiullah Haqqani.

== History ==
Farah University was established in September 2012. After the Islamic Emirate returned to power, the university was run by Maulvi Noor-ul-Haq Mazhari, who was the deputy head of the Ministry of Higher Education in the southwest. He was also a special representative at Farah University at the time. Mufti Nematullah Ansari, who was in charge of the councils of universities in Farah Province before the Islamic Emirate returned, was elected as the head of Farah University in the Ministry of Higher Education. After the leadership changed in the Ministry of Higher Education, when Sheikh Neda Mohammad was elected as the acting minister, one of the young scholars, Mufti Samiullah Ahmadi, was sent as the head of Farah University.

== Faculty ==
The following faculties are available at Farah University:

- Education and Training
- Agriculture
- Economics
- Sharia and Islamic Studies
- Public Administration and Policy

== See also ==
- List of universities in Afghanistan
