= Puli Alam =

City in Logar Province, Afghanistan

Pul-i-Alam پل علم
- Provincial capital
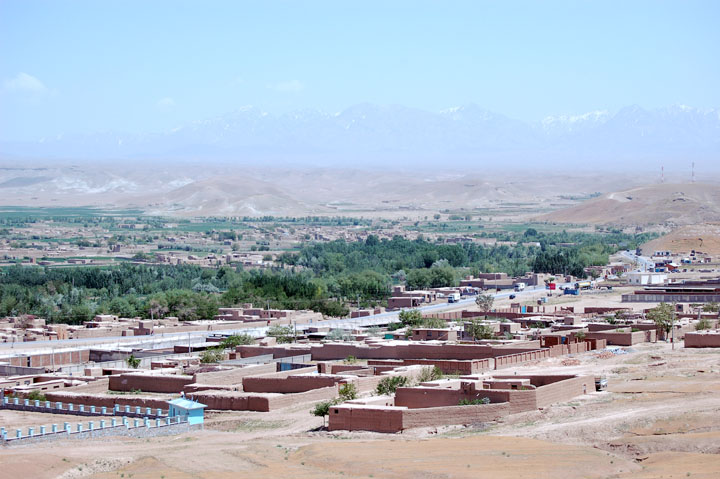
- Pul-i-Alam in 2007
- Interactive map of Pul-i-Alam
- Location in Afghanistan
- Coordinates: 33°58′51″N 69°02′06″E
- Country: Afghanistan
- Province: Logar
- District: Puli Alam

Government
  - Type: Municipality
- Elevation: 1,922 m (6,306 ft)

Population (2025)
  - Provincial capital: 130,793
  - Urban: 7,138
- Time zone: UTC+04:30 (Afghanistan Time)

Pul-i-Alam (Note: Pashto: پل علم, romanized: Puli Alam, pronounced [ˈpuli ʔaˈlam]; Dari: پل علم, romanized: Pul-i Alam, pronounced [ˈpʰʊlɪ ʔaˈlam]), also written as Puli Alam, Pul-e Alam or Pul-e-Alam, is a city in eastern Afghanistan, serving as the capital of Logar Province. It is within the jurisdiction of Puli Alam District and has an estimated population of 130,793 people. They are mostly ethnic Pashtuns and Tajiks. The city had 2,546 dwellings in 2015.

Pul-i-Alam is connected by a major road to Kabul in the north, Gardez in the southeast and the Kabul–Kandahar Highway in Saydabad District of Maidan Wardak Province in the west. The Logar University is located around 17 km (11 mi) to the east from the center of the city.

== History ==
During the recent US-led war in Afghanistan, a provincial reconstruction team, PRT Logar of the Czech Republic, was based in Puli Alam. After the Americans and their allies fled from Afghanistan in August 2021, Pul-i-Alam was seized by Taliban fighters as part of the wider 2021 Taliban offensive.

== Geography ==
=== Land use ===
Pul-i-Alam is an urban village in eastern Afghanistan. Agriculture is the dominant land use, accounting for 49% of total land. Only 19% of land is classified as built-up, and 48% of this area is described as vacant plots. In Districts 1–3, the majority of the dwellings are regular houses.

The city has 4 districts and a total land area of 38 km^{2} (15 sq mi) or 3,752 ha (9,270 acres).

== Climate ==
Pul-i-Alam is at high altitude. It features a hot-summer humid continental climate (Dsa) under the Köppen climate classification. It has hot, dry summers and cold, snowy winters. The average temperature in Puli Alam is 11.0 °C, while the annual precipitation averages 306 mm.

July is the hottest month of the year with an average temperature of 24.7 °C. The coldest month, January, has an average temperature of -6.8 °C.

Climate data for Puli Alam
Month	Jan	Feb	Mar	Apr	May	Jun	Jul	Aug	Sep	Oct	Nov	Dec	Year
Mean daily maximum °C (°F)	2.1 (35.8)	2.4 (36.3)	10.3 (50.5)	18.8 (65.8)	24.8 (76.6)	29.3 (84.7)	31.9 (89.4)	30.8 (87.4)	26.9 (80.4)	20.8 (69.4)	12.8 (55.0)	6.4 (43.5)	18.1 (64.6)
Daily mean °C (°F)	−3 (27)	−2.3 (27.9)	5.0 (41.0)	13.0 (55.4)	18.7 (65.7)	23.0 (73.4)	25.6 (78.1)	24.5 (76.1)	20.6 (69.1)	14.7 (58.5)	7.4 (45.3)	1.2 (34.2)	12.4 (54.3)
Mean daily minimum °C (°F)	−8.0 (17.6)	−7.3 (18.9)	−0.5 (31.1)	6.9 (44.4)	12.4 (54.3)	16.5 (61.7)	19.0 (66.2)	18.1 (64.6)	14.2 (57.6)	8.6 (47.5)	2.2 (36.0)	−3.6 (25.5)	6.5 (43.8)
Average precipitation mm (inches)	37 (1.5)	50 (2.0)	54 (2.1)	58 (2.3)	37 (1.5)	11 (0.4)	6 (0.2)	4 (0.2)	3 (0.1)	7 (0.3)	17 (0.7)	22 (0.9)	306 (12.2)
Source: Climate-Data.org

== Notable people ==
- Mohammad Nabi
- Gulbadin Naib
