= Rana Institute of Higher Studies =

University in Kabul, Afghanistan

Coordinates: 34.5367°N 69.1440°E

Rana University
- د رڼا پوهنتون/ دانشگاه رنا
- Motto: TO Nurture Talents
- Type: Private University
- Established: March 14, 2009
- Chancellor: Dr. Shafiulla naime
- Vice-Chancellor: M. Naim Azimi
- Faculty: 98
- Administrative staff: 150
- Students: 8000
- Undergraduates: 4000
- Location: Kabul, Afghanistan
- Campus: Baraki Square
- Colors: Red & White
- Website: http://ru.edu.af

RANA University (Note: Pashto: د رڼا پوهنتون Dari: دانشگاه رنا) is a higher education university in Kabul, Afghanistan.

The University offers courses in Information Technology (BIT), Software Engineering (BSE), Law (LLB), Political Science and Business Administration.

Classes in the business and computer departments are taught in English, while those in other areas, such as LLB and BJM (Bachelor of Journalism and Mass Communication), are taught in Persian.

== See also ==
- List of universities in Afghanistan
