= Faryab Higher Education Institute =

Non-Profit Public Higher Educational institute in Northwestern Afghanistan

Faryab Higher Education Institute (Note: Pashto: د فاریاب د لوړو زده کړو موسسه Dari: موسسه تحصیلات عالی فاریاب) is a college that was founded in 1977. Faryab promoted pedagogy with education and agriculture faculties. It has 637 students, and 36 professors. This Institute is a non-profit public higher education institution located in the large town of Maymana (population range of 50,000-249,999 inhabitants), Faryab. Faryab University (FU) is a very small (enrollment range: 500-999 students) coeducational higher education institution.

== See also ==
- List of universities in Afghanistan
