= Ghor University =

University in Ghor province, Afghanistan

Coordinates: 34°31′10.5″N 65°19′0.2″E

- پوهنتون غور / د غور پوهنتون
- Established: 2012
- President: Mujibullah Moqri
- Location: Firozkoh, Ghor Province, Afghanistan
- Website: ghru.edu.af

Ghor University (Note: Pashto: د غور پوهنتون Dari: پوهنتون غور) is a public university in Firozkoh, which is the capital of Ghor Province in central Afghanistan. The university was established in 2012 and is controlled by the nation's Ministry of Higher Education, which is headquartered in Kabul.

== Faculties ==
The following faculties are currently available at Ghor University:

1. Agriculture
2. Computer Science
3. Sharia
4. Education

== See also ==
- List of universities in Afghanistan
