= Parwan University =

University in Charikar, Afghanistan

- د پروان پوهنتون / دانشگاه پروان
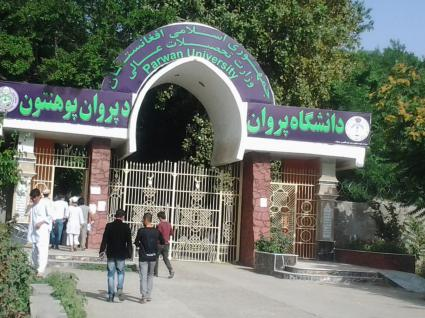
- Location: Charikar, Parwan province, Afghanistan

Parwan University (Note: Pashto: د پروان پوهنتون Dari: دانشگاه پروان) is located in Charikar, capital of Parwan province, central Afghanistan. It was established in 2006. Parwan university has faculties of Economics, Agriculture, Engineering, Computer Science, Islamic Shariia, Language & Literature, Journalism, Social Sciences, Law, and Education.

It Has About 6-7 Thousands Students, With Around 300 Lecturers. 10 Faculties with 31 Departments.

It Has A Mosque, a Research Farm (Agricultural Activities), an Internet Club, IT Center, Library, Conference Halls, a cafeteria, a publication office, separated hostels for boys and girls and other facilities.

Departments of Faculty of Computer Science:

- IT (Information technology)
- IS (Information System)

Departments of Faculty Of Engineering:

- Civil Engineering
- Construction of Cities

Departments of Faculty of Language & Literature:

- Pashto
- Dari (Persian)
- Arabic
- English
- French

Departments of Faculty of Journalism:

- Radio & Television

Press (News)Departments of Faculty of Economics:

- Banking
- Management and Administration

Departments of Faculty of Agriculture:

- Horticulture
- Agri-economics and extension
- Animal Sciences
- Plant Sciences

Departments of Faculty of Education:

- Biology
- Chemistry
- Maths
- Geography
- History
- Islamic Culture
- Arts
- Vocational Studies

== See also ==
- List of universities in Afghanistan
