= Kabul Education University of Rabbani =

Public university in Kabul, Afghanistan

Coordinates: 34.53237°N 69.11274°E

Kabul Education University
- د کابل ښوونې او روزنې پوهنتون / دانشگاه تعلیم و تربیه کابل
- Motto: Training the Future Makers
- Established: 2003
- Administrative staff: 205 lecturers
- Students: 5,830
- Location: Kabul, Afghanistan
- Website: keu.edu.af/en

Kabul Education University (Note: Pashto: د کابل ښوونې او روزنې پوهنتون Dari: دانشگاه تعلیم و تربیه کابل) is a public university in Kabul, Afghanistan. It originally served as the Teachers Training Centre in the 1990s, awarding bachelor's degrees to its students in fellowship with UNESCO. During the presidency of Burhanuddin Rabbani, it developed into the Institute of Pedagogy and was given the status of higher education institute and transferred to the Ministry of Higher Education. It was given an official charter as a university in 2003. Kabul Education University of Rabbani is among the best educational institutions in Afghanistan, which is among the top 5 universities according to the national rankings. Kabul Education University of Rabbani ranks in the national rating of Afghanistan, this impressive result was achieved in less than 20 years.

== Campus ==
The university campus is in the Afshar district of Kabul within Shaheed Rabbani Square چهارراهی شمع کابل.

== Composition ==
Kabul Education University of Rabbani is relatively small, teaching about 5000 students on average.

== Organisation and administration ==
The university is managed by the Ministry of Higher Education. Day-to-day management is the responsibility of the chancellor, Zaibullah Assadi.

=== Faculty and departments ===
The university has 6 faculties and 21 departments:

- Social Sciences — Islamic Cultural Studies, History, Geography and Sociology departments
- Languages and Literature — Dari, Pashto, Arabic, Russian and English departments
- Natural Sciences — Chemistry, Biology, Physics, Math and Computer Science departments
- Physical Education — Sports Theory, Individual Sports and Group Sports departments
- Special Studies — Visually and Audibly Impaired departments
- Psychology - Department of General Psychology and Department of Counseling Psychology

== See also ==
- List of universities in Afghanistan
