= Salam University =

Private university in Kabul, Afghanistan

Coordinates: 34.5438°N 69.1481°E

- پوهنتون سلام سلام پوهنتون
- Type: Independent, self-governing, Private
- Established: 2009
- President: Dr Misbahullah Abdul Baqi
- Location: Kabul, Afghanistan
- Campus: Kunduz, Afghanistan
- Colours: Green, Dark Blue
- Website: www.salam.edu.af

Salam University (Pashto: سلام پوهنتون; Dari: پوهنتون سلام) is a private university in Kabul, the capital of Afghanistan, having one campus in Kunduz, northern Afghanistan. The university was accredited in 2009 by the Ministry of Higher Education as private institution of higher education. Salam currently offers five undergraduate degree programs and a graduate degree in Sharia and Law.

== History ==
Salam University has been established in 2009 by a group of professors and lecturers from national and international universities. The university is authorized and licensed by Ministry of Higher Education in 2009 as an institute of higher education; in 2013 it was given the status of a university.

Salam University provides education in separate classes to male and female students.

== Programs ==
Salam University Bachelor of Business Administration and Bachelor of Computer Science programs are taught in English while other faculties are taught official local languages. University follows the rules and guidelines of Afghan Ministry of Higher Education for running credit based system. The academic year is combined of two regular semesters the Spring Semester starting in March and the Fall Semester starting in September each year.

Undergraduate Degree Program

Salam University offers four-years eight semesters degree programs in Law & Political Science, Economics and Business Administration, Computer & Information Technology, Shari & Law and Engineering.

Graduate Degree Program

Salam University started offering graduate program in Spring Semester, 2014, offering Master of Sharia and Law. A total of 30 students were given the chance using an entry test and interview approach to attend the program.

== Management ==
Salam University has a management board led by Dr Misbahullah Abdul Baqi. There are various administrative departments and commissions contributing to the overall management of university and execution of relevant tasks.

== Campuses ==
There are two campuses of the university.

Salam University Kabul Campus

=== Kabul ===
- Main Campus - Gul e Surkh Square, Kolola Poshta, Kabul.

=== Kunduz ===
- Kunduz campus is located at Kunduz city.
