= Kaboora Institute of Higher Education =

University in Kabul, Afghanistan

Kaboora Institute of Higher Education (Pashto: د کابورا د لوړو زدکړو موسسه) is a university in Kabul, the capital city of Afghanistan.

== See also ==
- List of universities in Afghanistan
