= Herat University =

University in Herat, Afghanistan

- د هرات پوهنتون / پوهنتون هرات
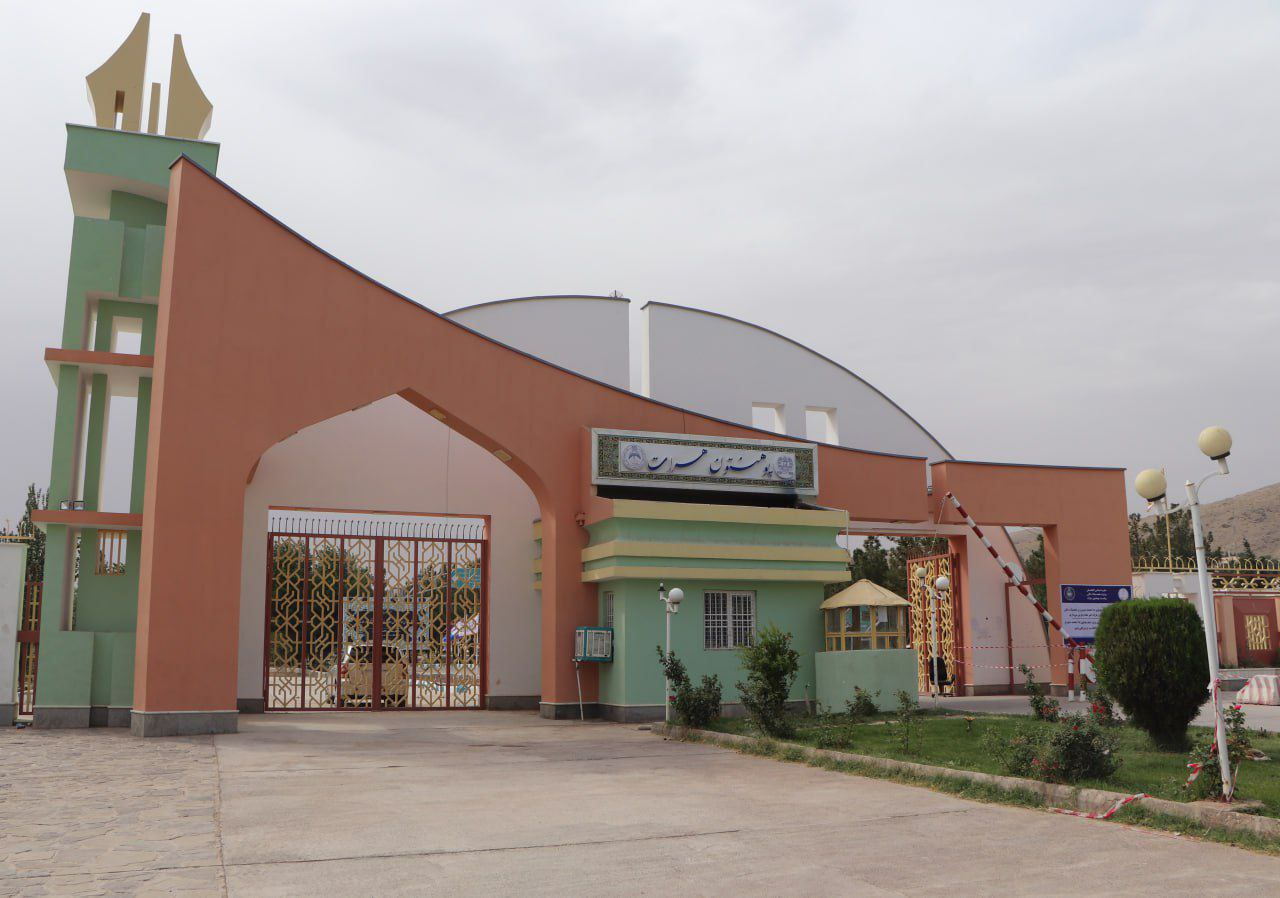
- Type: Public
- Established: 1988
- President: Abdul Ghani
- Academic staff: 409
- Students: 7,422
- Undergraduates: 6,246
- Location: Herat, Herat Province, Afghanistan; 34.3690°N 62.2120°E
- Campus: Urban
- Colors: Black, red, and green
- Website: hu.edu.af/en
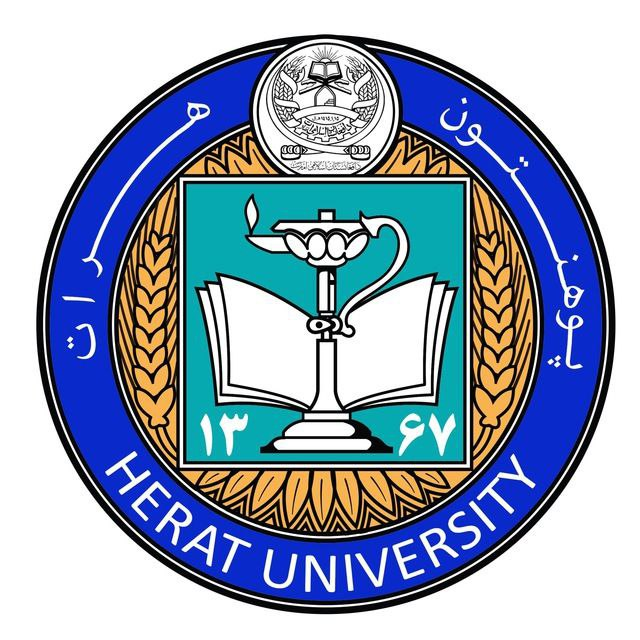

Herat University (Note: Pashto: د هرات پوهنتون Dari: پوهنتون هرات) (HU) is a public university located in Herat, the capital of Herat Province, in western Afghanistan. It was inaugurated in 1988, beginning with a faculty of Literature and Humanities. Its first President was Abubakr Rashed. The university has 14 faculties and 45 departments. The most popular field of study is Education/Pedagogy. Although university female education is indefinitely banned in Afghanistan, the Medical Faculty at Herat University has around 550 female students.

In recent years, Herat University managed and maintained relations of cooperation with a number of foreign universities in United States, Germany, Italy, Thailand, Slovakia, Iran, India and Indonesia. As a result of this cooperation teaching curriculum in faculties of Computer Science, Science, Engineering, Economics, Agriculture, Medicine, Religious and Islamic and Journalism and mass communication has been partial or totally amended and syllabi and textbooks are prepared as well.

In 2022, after the Taliban takeover of Afghanistan, women were banned from attending universities and any classes in universities, which has drastically affected Herat University, one of Afghanistan's largest universities.

== Achievements ==
Herat University had as of 2012 graduated about 6039 specialists.

== Faculty ==
Herat University has 16 faculties and 71 departments, the students are studying in different faculties and different fields.

Herat University faculties are Agriculture, Applied Science, Computer Science, Economics, Education, Engineering, Fine Arts, Journalism, Law & Political Sciences, Literature & Humanities, Medicine, Public Administration, Dentistry, Social Sciences, Theology & Islamic Studies, and Veterinary Science.

Herat University is a major regional university and supports 4 filial universities in western provinces of the country. These universities are located in Nimrooz, Badghis, Farah, and Ghor.

=== Alumni ===
Notable alumni include:

- Laleh Osmany, women's rights activist

== Programs ==
Herat University offers a range of academic programs for credit, at the baccalaureate levels (over 100 majors) and 1 master program in Persian literature.

== Students Statistics ==
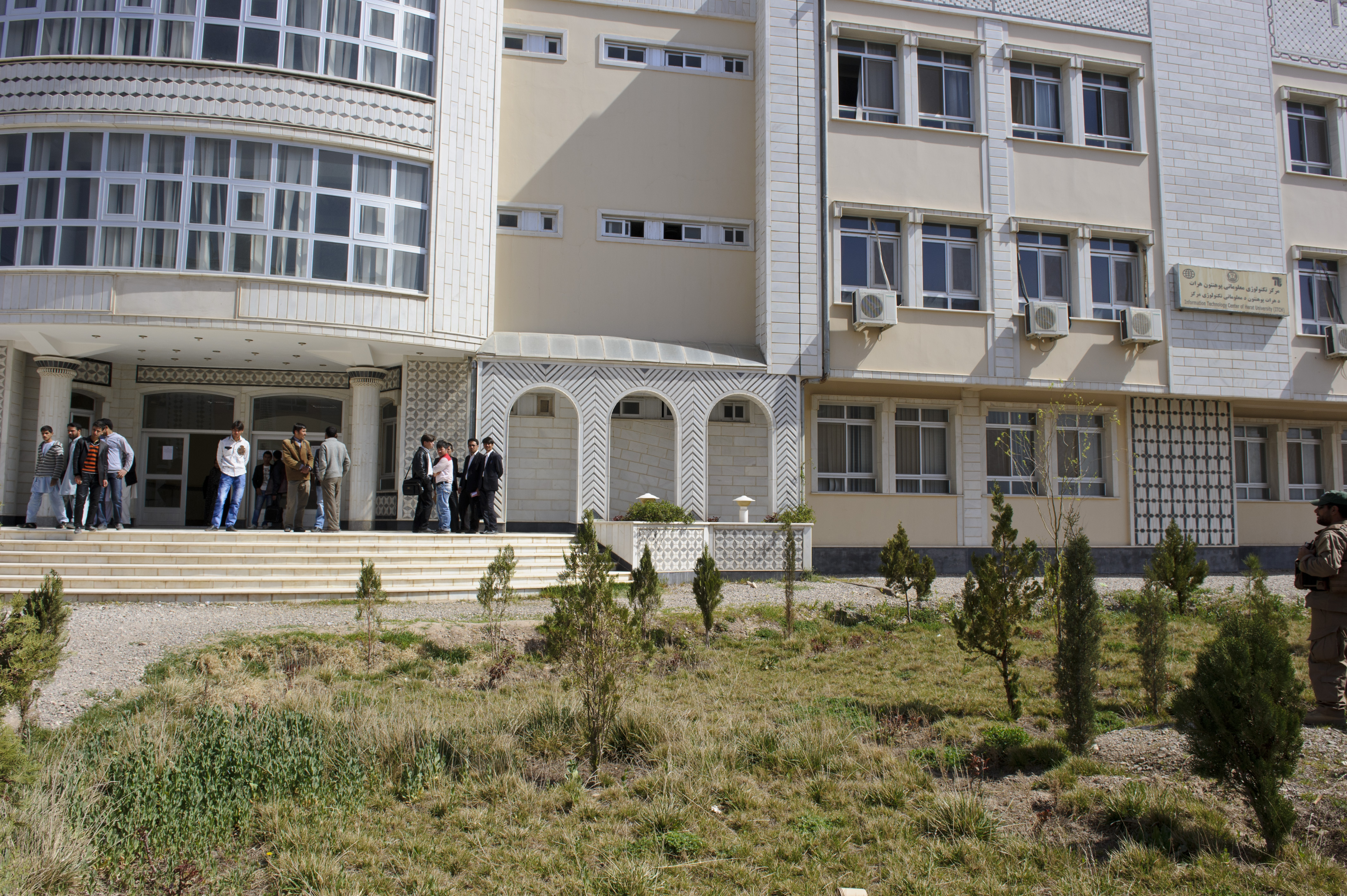
Afghan students standing in front of the main campus of Herat University

No.	Faculty	Male	Female	Total
1	Agriculture	651	150	801
2	Applied Science	470	297	767
3	Badqis Agriculture	232	6	238
4	Badqis Education	92	48	140
5	Computer Science	307	90	397
6	Economics	716	156	872
7	Education (Pedagogy)	1278	1232	2510
8	Engineering	616	65	681
9	Fine & Arts	100	122	222
10	Islamic Studies (Theology)	536	208	744
11	Journalism	202	60	262
12	Law & Political Science	437	215	652
13	Literature & Humanities	379	416	795
14	Medicine	423	342	765
15	Public Administration	342	119	461
16	Veterinary	106	16	122
17	Stomatology	4	3	7
	Total	6892	3545	10436

== See also ==
- List of universities in Afghanistan
