= Samangan University =

University in Samangan, Afghanistan

Samangan University, Afghanistan
- پوهنتون سمنگان / د سمنګان پوهنتون
- Location: Samangan province, Afghanistan

Samangan University (Note: Pashto: د سمنګان پوهنتون Dari: پوهنتون سمنگان) is a university located in Samangan province, northern Afghanistan.

Institution of higher education, non-profit, non-governmental Samangan in 2005 after obtaining the necessary license, started its activity with the cooperation and support of the Ministry of Science, Research and Technology (and other organizations related) and systematic planning and effort boarding responsible institution, the Learn increase in per capita space used for educational, academic support facilities, textbooks and teaching aids, books Institute to achieve higher goals in the coming years is expected.

== See also ==
- List of universities in Afghanistan
