= Qalam Institute of Higher Education =

- مؤسسه تحصیلات عالی قلم
- Other names: Qalam Higher Education
- Motto: ځلانده راتلونکی
- Motto in English: Bright Future
- Established: 2015
- Founders: Gul Rahman Qazi
- Chairman: Gul Rahman Qazi
- Vice-Chancellor: Omid Khan Oxir
- Location: district #15, Serah-e-Khawaja Bughra, Kabul, Afghanistan, Kabul, Afghanistan
- Language: Dari and Pashto
- Website: qalam.edu.af (2018 archive)

Qalam Institute of Higher Education is a for-profit private coeducational higher education institution in Kabul, Afghanistan.

Qalam is officially accredited and/or recognized by the Afghan Ministry of Higher Education.
