= Khatam Al-Nabieen University =

University in Kabul, Afghanistan

- دانشگاه خاتم النبیین / د خاتم الانبياء پوهنتون
- Type: Private
- Established: 1966
- Location: Kabul, Kabul Province, Afghanistan
- Website: khu.edu.af (2019 archive)

Khatam Al-Nabieen University (Dari: دانشگاه خاتم النبیین ، Pashto: د خاتم الانبياء پوهنتون) is a private university established in 1966, located in the city of Kabul, Afghanistan.

== See also ==
- List of universities in Afghanistan
