= Gharjistan University =

University in Pul-e-Sorkh, Kabul, Afghanistan

- دانشگاه غرجستان
- Type: Private
- Established: 2010
- Location: Pul-e-Sorkh, Kabul Province, Afghanistan

Gharjistan University (Dari: دانشگاه غرجستان) is a private university, located in Pul-e-Sorkh, Kabul, Afghanistan established in 2010.

== Faculties ==
- Economics and management
- Law and political science
- Computer science
- Social science

== See also ==
- List of universities in Afghanistan
