= Badghis University =

University in Afghanistan

- د بادغیس پوهنتون | پوهنتون بادغیس
- Location: Badghis province, Afghanistan

Badghis University (Note: Pashto: د بادغیس پوهنتون Dari: پوهنتون بادغیس) is a university located in Badghis province, Afghanistan.

== See also ==
- List of universities in Afghanistan
