= Rifah Afghanistan Institute =

Private education institution in Afghanistan

Rifah Afghanistan Institute (Dari: انستیتوت مسلکی رفاه افغانستان) is one of the private vocational education institutions in Afghanistan that provides vocational education in Business economics, Journalism and Computer science, associate programs. This institute was established in 2014 and taught 1110 students till end of 2017. The institute provides free-of-cost education and applies no tuition on students. The founder of Rifah Afghanistan Institute is Mr. Said Halim Hashimi.

== History ==
Rifah Afghanistan Institute was established in 2014 after registering with the Afghan Deputy Ministry for Technical and Vocational Education and Training of Afghan Ministry of Education. It started its educational activities in Kabul, Afghanistan.

After the institute began the activities, 330 students joined in 2014. The institute added the Journalism Department in 2015 and, after that, 450 students joined to the institute. After two years, 780 students graduated and earned associate degrees.

Now the number of Rifah Afghanistan Institutes has reached eight, the number of academic staff reached 24, and the number of students studying the above-mentioned fields reached 330 in 2014.

The institute's administrative units are Rectorate, Vice-Rectorate of Academics Affairs, Vice-Rectorate of Financial Affairs; Directorate of Students Affaires, Directorate of Culture and Relations; Center for Health and Psychology and Center for Researches and Publications.

== Academic programs ==
Rifah Afghanistan Institute has three associate level programs: Journalism, Business economics and Computer science. The programs' curriculum is approved by Afghan Deputy Ministry for Technical and Vocational Education and Training of Afghan Ministry of Education.

The Computer science Department provides Database and Networking education and training; the Economics Department provides Business economics and Management education; and the Journalism Department provides Radio-Television education and training.

The Department of Islamic studies is responsible to educate Islamic culture and Science for Muslim students studying in this institute and the Department of Foreign Languages teaches foreign language for students.

== Academic activities ==
Rifah Afghanistan Institute is trying to provide better education by preparing the practical curriculum, standard books, and necessary educational equipments and now is reaching this goal by planning next three year's plan.

The institute is publishing the Rifah Afghanistan Academic Magazine to fulfill the cultural activities and make a process where the instructors and students are able to publish their academic and research works.

The Health and Psychology Center is trying to maintain student physical and psychological health. The Research and Publication Center is focusing on instructors and students research and publishing its results.

Rifah Afghanistan Institute signed an agreement with Mars Educational Organization that prepares a good situation to share the academic experiences between these two institutions.

Rifah Afghanistan Institute signed two agreements with Ahead International to hold Project management Training series and Financial management Training supported by Afghan Ministry of Education and USAID in 2015 and 2016 and trained about 86 students. The institute prepared a German language proficiency course and educated seven students.
