= South Asia Co-operative Environment Programme =

- Logo of SACEP

- Flag of SACEP
- Abbreviation: SACEP
- Formation: 1982
- Type: Intergovernmental organization
- Legal status: Regional environmental organization
- Purpose: Environmental protection and sustainable development in South Asia
- Headquarters: Colombo, Sri Lanka
- Region served: South Asia
- Official languages: English
- Website: www.sacep.org

The South Asia Co-operative Environment Programme, also known as SACEP, is an inter-governmental organisation established in 1982 by the South Asian governments to promote and support the protection, management and enhancement of the environment in the region.

== The Governing Council (GC) ==
The GC is the principal review and deliberative body of SACEP and is responsible for determining its policy and programmes. It consists of one representative from each member state who will be of Ministerial portfolio and as per Articles of Association, should meet annually. Since becoming a legal entity in 1982, up to date Twelve GC meetings and Three Special Sessions of the GC had been held.

== Member Nations ==
- Afghanistan
- Bangladesh
- Bhutan
- India
- Maldives
- Nepal
- Pakistan
- Sri Lanka

== The Consultative Committee (CC) ==
The CC is responsible for facilitating the implementation of policies, strategies and programmes approved by the GC and provides guidance to the Secretariat in its activities. It consists of representatives of diplomatic missions of the Member States residing in Colombo.

== National Focal Points ==
Each Member State has designated a National Focal Point to facilitate the work of the Secretariat and to function as the main communication link between the Secretariat and the respective country. NFPs are expected to implement and monitor national programmes in co-operation with the Secretariat.

== Subject Area Focal Points ==
The Subject Area Focal Points are expected to co-operate with the secretariat in project identification, formulation, implementation and monitoring. The country, which is responsible for a particular subject area, designates a center of excellence for the subject and appoints a liaison officer.

== The Secretariat ==
The Secretariat consists of the Director General and professional, administrative and supporting staff. The secretariat is based in Colombo, Sri Lanka, and is under the patronage of the Sri Lankan Government.
