= Kunduz University =

University in Kunduz, Afghanistan

Coordinates: 36.7117°N 68.8634°E

- د کندز پوهنتون / پوهنتون قندوز
- President: Abdul Hadi Hemat
- Location: Kunduz, Kunduz Province, Afghanistan
- Website: kundoz.edu.af

Kunduz University (Note: Pashto: د کندز پوهنتون Dari: پوهنتون قندوز) is a public university in Kunduz, which is the capital of Kunduz Province in northeastern Afghanistan. It was established as a teacher training center in 1967 and became an institution of higher learning in 1994.

Kunduz University which is one of top 11 universities of Afghanistan is a co-education institute. Since 2003 Kunduz University has offered more than 8,000 graduates, including 1,500 women.

== Faculties ==
The following faculties are available at Kunduz University:

1. Sharia
2. General Medicine
3. Stomatology
4. Law and Political Science
5. Economics
6. Computer Science
7. Education
8. Veterinary Medicine
9. Agriculture

== Human rights symposiums ==
Kunduz University is also used for symposiums organized by UNAMA and other international organizations, such as “PROTECTING HUMAN RIGHTS IN AFGHANISTAN” in December 2019 in which more than 100 Kunduz students took part.

== See also ==
- List of universities in Afghanistan
