= Subdivisions of Afghanistan =

Afghanistan is divided into:

1. Provinces of Afghanistan
2. Districts of Afghanistan
3. Subdistricts of Afghanistan
