= Kardan University =

Private university in Kabul, Afghanistan

- پوهنتون کاردان کاردان پوهنتون
- Other name: Kardan
- Type: Private
- Established: 2002
- Founder: Roeen Rahmani
- Accreditation: Afghanistan Ministry of Higher Education, IACBE, AACSB, ACBSP
- Affiliations: IAU, GBSN
- Chancellor: Dr. Ahmad Khalid Hatam
- Vice-Chancellor: Jamshid Siddiqi
- Faculty: 130+
- Administrative staff: 100
- Undergraduates: 2,800+
- Postgraduates: 1,200+
- Location: Kabul, Afghanistan; 34°32′57.804″N 69°9′9.45″E
- Campus: Urban
- Colors: Blue, White and Orange
- Website: www.kardan.edu.af

Kardan University (Pashto: کاردان پوهنتون / Dari: پوهنتون کاردان) founded in 2002 in Kabul, Afghanistan is the first privately owned university in Afghanistan. It began its operations in a small classroom with 15 students at a time when private higher education was being introduced in the country for the first time.

The institute quickly became one of the largest private higher education institutions in the country and was elevated to university status by the Ministry of higher Education in 2006. Kardan University consists of five important pillars including Operations, Academics, Strategy & Growth, Registrar Office and Financial Management.

Today, the university is a hub for education, research, innovation, and public engagement offering accredited graduate and undergraduate degrees in multiple disciplines. It has over 4,000 students pursuing diploma, undergraduate and graduate programs across its one campus in Kabul city. The university offers courses in information Technology, Data Science, Business Administration, Economics, Law, Civil Engineering, and Political Science at the undergraduate level, and Data Science, Business Administration, International Relations, Construction Engineering Management, International Law, and Corporate Law at the graduate level, and Ph.D in Business Administration as the first university in Afghanistan.

To date, Kardan University has produced more than 30,000 graduates across a wide range of academic disciplines.

== History ==
2002

Kardan Institute is founded with 12 students in a rental facility in Macroryan area of Kabul. The main goal was to provide short-term certificate programs.

2004

Kardan expands academic programs introducing diploma level programs enrolling more than 600 students with around 20% women participation.

2006

Kardan makes history by becoming the first private higher education institute officially registered with the Government of Afghanistan. Bachelor of Business Administration (BBA) program is launched with over 130 students enrolled in the first cohort.

2011

Kardan University initiates the accreditation process through the International Association of Collegiate Business Education (IACBE) becoming the first candidate for accreditation, representing Afghanistan. Student enrollment reaches a peak of 6,000.

2012

Kardan University leads the establishment of Afghanistan's first association of private universities. The university is subsequently elected as the chair with an initial membership of 40 national private institutions.

2013

Kardan University is re-elected as the chair of Private Universities in Afghanistan.

2014

Kardan University becomes chartered to issue master level programs in business and international relations. Student enrollment stands at over 5,000.

2020

The COVID-19 pandemic strikes and most of the educational activities are halted or at least disturbed. However, Kardan University has some major accomplishments in 2020. Soon after the lockdown, Kardan is the first university to launch online classes for all its programs.

2021

In 2021, Dr. Ahmad Khalid Hatam was appointed as the Chancellor of Kardan University. He holds a Ph.D. in Islamic Law and Jurisprudence from the International Islamic University Islamabad, where he also earned his LL.M. in International Law and LL.B. (Hons) in Shariah and Law. Dr. Hatam joined Kardan University in 2018 as an Assistant Professor in the Master of International Relations Department and later served as Dean of the Faculty of Social Sciences before being appointed Chancellor.
