= Abdul Baqi Haqqani =

Afghan Higher Education Minister since 2021

Abdul Baqi Haqqani عبدالباقی حقانی

Minister of Higher Education (Acting)
- In office 29 August 2021 – 18 October 2022
- Prime Minister: Hasan Akhund
- Leader: Hibatullah Akhundzada
- Preceded by: Abas Basir
- Succeeded by: Neda Mohammad Nadeem

Governor of Paktia and Khost
- In office c. 1995 – c. 2001
- Prime Minister: Mohammed Rabbani; Abdul Kabir
- Leader: Mohammed Omar
- Succeeded by: Mohammad Nabi Omari for Khost (2021); Muhammad Ali Jan Ahmed for Paktia (2021)

Deputy Minister for Information and Culture
- In office c. 1995 – c. 2001
- Prime Minister: Mohammed Rabbani; Abdul Kabir
- Leader: Mohammed Omar
- Succeeded by: Zabiullah Mujahid (2021)
- Minister: Amir Khan Muttaqi

Personal details
- Born: 1961 (age 64–65) Jalalabad, Afghanistan
- Occupation: Politician, Taliban member

Abdul Baqi Haqqani Bashir Mohammad, or Abdul Baqi Haqqani (Pashto: عبد الباقی حقانی [ˈabdʊl bɑˈqi haqɑˈni]; born c. 1961) is an Afghan and senior member of the Taliban. He became acting Higher Education Minister of the Islamic Emirate of Afghanistan following the Fall of Kabul in August 2021, a position which he held until October 2022.

== Early life ==
Abdul Baqi Haqqani was born in Jalalabad, Afghanistan around 1960–1962.

== Administrative career ==
=== Islamic Emirate (1996–2001) ===
During the Islamic Emirate of Afghanistan (1996–2001), Abdul Baqi held positions as governor of Khost and Paktika Provinces and vice-minister of Information and Culture, and worked in the Consulate Department of the Ministry of Foreign Affairs.

=== Islamic Emirate (2021–present) ===
In August 2021, following the Fall of Kabul, Abdul Baqi became acting Higher Education Minister. He stated that women had the right to study but that women students would study in separate classrooms to men students.

in August 2023, Abdul Baqi criticized the government for its lack of access toward women in work and education. He remarked: "The problems should be solved. The government can be preserved through universities not through seminaries. The universities should become standard. The rights of women to education should be provided". He also stated: "Women can work in various aspects, and if we cannot provide the grounds for it, it is our failure".

== Sanctions ==
In 2012, Abdul Baqi was listed for sanctions by the European Union on the grounds of his administrative role in the Islamic Emirate, for "anti-government military activities" in 2003, and for "organising militant activities" in 2009.
