= Kabul Health Sciences Institute =

Higher education in Kabul, Afghanistan

The Kabul Health Sciences Institute (KHSI; Pashto: د د کابل د صحي زدکړو موسسه) is a higher education establishment for the study of health science, and is situated in Kabul, the capital city of Afghanistan.
