= Dunya University of Afghanistan =

Private university in Kabul, Afghanistan

Dunya University of Afghanistan is a private university established in 2009 in Kabul, Afghanistan in partnership with the Swiss UMEF University. Swiss UMEF is accredited by the Swiss higher education authorities.

Dunya University was founded by General Ahmed Ali Sangdel and his sons.

Dunya University is recognized by the Ministry of Higher Education of Afghanistan, and its academic business units were accredited by the International Assembly for Collegiate Business Education as of December 2016.

Dunya University of Afghanistan is an international university in Afghanistan with a distinctive faculty of different nationalities, of which the majority are European or North American. Dunya University is known favorably for its contribution to the private and public sectors in Afghanistan.

DUA is a member of the Accreditation Council for Business Schools and Programs (ACBSP), and the Association to Advance Collegiate Schools of Business. Membership in these organization does not imply accreditation, although ACBSP is recognized as an accrediting body by the Council for Higher Education Accreditation. The AACSB report on DUA states that DUA is not accredited.

== Brief history ==
Established in 2009, Dunya University of Afghanistan is a for-profit private higher-education institution located in the metropolis of Kabul (population range of 1,000,000-5,000,000 inhabitants).

=== The world ===
A name was well chosen to reflect its positioning as the first university in Afghanistan with a distinctive international flavor, thanks to an international faculty hailing from Switzerland, Brazil, Canada, China, France, Germany, Italy, the UK, and the USA.

=== 2005-2006 ===
His Excellency General Ahmed Ali Sangdel – and several members of his family, as well as a team of devoted colleagues with extensive international educational experience, started an in-depth reflection on the creation of a university in Kabul.

== Advisors ==
Dunya University has international, top-ranked advisors who have graduated from major international universities, notably in Europe, the USA and Asia, in order to bring a multicultural atmosphere to our campus.

== Overview ==
Officially recognized by the Ministry of Higher Education of Afghanistan, Dunya University of Afghanistan (DUA) is a very small (uniRank enrollment range: 250-499 students) coeducational Afghan higher education institution. Dunya University of Afghanistan (DUA) offers courses and programs leading to officially recognized higher education degrees such as bachelor degrees in several areas of study.
