= Ministry of Higher Education (Afghanistan) =

Government ministry of Afghanistan

- Dari: وزارت تحصیلات عالی; Pashto: د افغانستان د لوړو زده کړو وزارت
- Ministry flag

Agency overview
- Jurisdiction: Government of Afghanistan
- Headquarters: Kart-e-Char, Kabul, Afghanistan
- Minister responsible: Neda Mohammad
- Deputy Minister responsible: Lutfullah kharkha
- Website: www.mohe.gov.af/en

The Afghan Ministry of Higher Education (Dari: وزارت تحصیلات عالی, Pashto: د افغانستان د لوړو زده کړو وزارت) is the government ministry that is in charge of regulating, expanding, and developing Afghanistan's institutions of higher education.

The Ministry is responsible for the training of teachers and for establishing a national higher education curriculum as well as special education programs such as in-service training and promoting further education for university faculty members.

The Ministry also develops partnerships with international universities, organizes seminars and conferences, ensures that residential accommodation is available for students and teachers of universities and provides expertise and training in accounting, management procedures, and computer literacy.

== History ==
The Ministry of Higher Education was first proposed during the time of Prime Minister Mohammad Musa Shafiq on 1 March 1973 as part of Afghanistan's efforts to modernize its education system and promote scientific research. A supplement to the Basic Organization Law was prepared to facilitate its establishment, with the goal of addressing the country’s social and economic needs through the development of higher education. The ministry was envisioned to oversee the balanced growth of higher education institutions across Afghanistan, ensuring alignment with national progress and priorities. It would also be responsible for establishing and managing research institutes, fostering cultural and scientific research, and creating a framework to protect and encourage inventors through awards and supportive measures. Additionally, the ministry sought to build connections between Afghan scientific institutions and their international counterparts, promoting collaboration on a global scale.

The proposal came at a time when Afghanistan's higher education system was facing significant challenges. The sole university in the country, Kabul University, was struggling to accommodate the growing number of high school graduates, and there was increasing pressure to establish universities in other provinces. The quality of BA programs was notably weak compared to international standards, with insufficient textbooks, a lack of qualified teachers, and no significant ties to foreign universities. Research infrastructure was virtually non-existent, with no advanced laboratories or research centers capable of addressing the country’s academic and developmental needs.

To lay the groundwork for this initiative, the government appointed a commission led by then Deputy and acting Education Minister Mohammad Yasin Azim, tasked with drafting a comprehensive report on the ministry’s organization and functions. This initiative aimed not only to address the pressing need for reform but also to tackle the broader socio-economic issues tied to education, such as unemployment among educated youth and the widening gap between rich and poor. By transferring the responsibility of higher education from the overburdened Education Ministry to a specialized body, the government hoped to alleviate campus unrest and create a more focused approach to academic reform.

While the objectives of the Ministry of Higher Education were ambitious, its success depended on strong leadership and the effective implementation of reforms. The establishment of this ministry marked a critical first step in addressing Afghanistan's educational challenges and building a system capable of meeting the demands of modernization in a rapidly changing world.

== Ministers ==
Name	Term	Notes
Hamdullah Nomani		Under Mohammed Omar
Din Mohammad Hanif		Under Mohammed Omar
Sharif Fayez	22 December 2001 – 23 December 2004	
Amir Shah Hasanyar	23 December 2004 – 22 March 2006	Previously Member of Educational Council of Kabul University
Mohammad Azam Dadfar	22 March 2006 – January 2010	Previously Minister of Refugees
Obaidullah Obaid	2 January 2010	Nomination rejected by the Wolesi Jirga
Muhammad Hashim Esmatullahi	16 January 2010	Nomination rejected by the Wolesi Jirga
Sarwar Danish	January 2010 – ?	Acting Minister, nomination not approved by the Wolesi Jirga
Obaidullah Obaid	February 2012 – April 2014	
Mohammad Osman Babury	April 2014 - April 2015	Acting Minister
Farida Momand	April 2015 – 14 November 2016	dismissed by Wolesi Jirga in November 2016
Abdul Latif Roshan	22 June 2017 – 22 November 2017	Acting Minister
Najibullah Khwaja Umari	22 November 2017 – 22 May 2019	Acting Minister. Approved by Wolesi Jirga in December 2017
Abdul Tawab Balakarzi	23 May 2019 – 13 September 2020	Acting Minister
Abas Basir	13 September 2020 – 15 August 2021	Acting Minister
Abdul Baqi Haqqani	7 September 2021 – 18 October 2022	Acting Minister
Neda Mohammad	18 October 2022 – present	Acting Minister

Former Ministers of Higher Education:

- Danesh, (201001)
- Danesh, Minister Designate Higher Education (20100626), no vote of confidence.
- Danesh, Acting Minister of Higher Education (2010)
- Dr. Mohammad Azam Dadfar (2009-201001), acting Minister till 20120305.
- Dr. Obaidullah Obaid (20120305 -20140930)
- Dr. Obaidullah Obaid Acting Minister of Higher Education (20141001)
- acting Minister of Higher Education Muhammad Osman Baburi (20141209)
- Mrs Prof Farida Mohmand (20150418, 20161114 appeached and acting)
- Abdul Latif Rushan Abdul Latif Roshan (20171030) acting resigned (20171122)
- Khwaja Omari (20171122, 20171204 confirmed)
- Abdul Tawab Balakarzai (20190526, 20200831)
- Dr. Abbar Basir (20200831, 20201121)
- Abdul Bari Haqqani (20210830, 20221018) acting
- Nada Mohammad Nadeem Nida Mohammad Nadim(20221018)

Deputy Minister of Higher Education:

- Dr Lutfullah Khairkhwa (20211005, 20220118)

Deputy Minister of Higher Education:

- Prof. M. Osman Babury Babari, Deputy Minister for academic Affairs (20100119),
- Mohammad Sarwar Danish (20100118),
- Ass Prof. Dr. Gul Hassan Walizai (20120912)
- Abdul Tawab Balakarzai (20181100, 20190322)

Financial and Administrative Deputy Ministry of Higher Education:

- Ahmad Seyar Mahjor, (20170311)

Head of the examinations division in the Taliban’s Higher Education Ministry:

- Abdul Qadir Khamush (202210210)

== See also ==
- Higher education in Afghanistan
