= Momand =

Momand may refer to:

- Abdul Ahad Momand, Afghan Pilot/Cosmonaut.
- Farida Momand (born 1965), Afghan politician
- Mohabat Momand (born 1995), Afghan cricketer
- Mohammad Gul Khan Momand (1885–1964), Afghan politician
- Qalandar Momand (1930–2003), Pakistani writer
- Wafadar Momand (born 2000), Afghan cricketer

== See also ==
- Momand Dara District, a district in Nangarhar Province, Afghanistan
- Abdul Ahad Mohmand (born 1959), Afghan aviator
- Mohmand, Pashtun tribe
