= 2018 Jalalabad attack =

2018 Jalalabad attack may refer to:

- 2018 Save the Children Jalalabad attack in January
- July 2018 Jalalabad suicide bombing
- September 2018 Jalalabad suicide bombing
