= Jalalabad suicide bombing =

Jalalabad suicide bombing may refer to:

- 2015 Jalalabad suicide bombing
- 2016 Jalalabad suicide bombing
- 2018 Save the Children Jalalabad attack
- July 2018 Jalalabad suicide bombing
- 2019 Jalalabad suicide bombing
