= Jalalabad =

City in Nangarhar Province, Afghanistan

Jalalabad جلال‌آباد
- Provincial capital
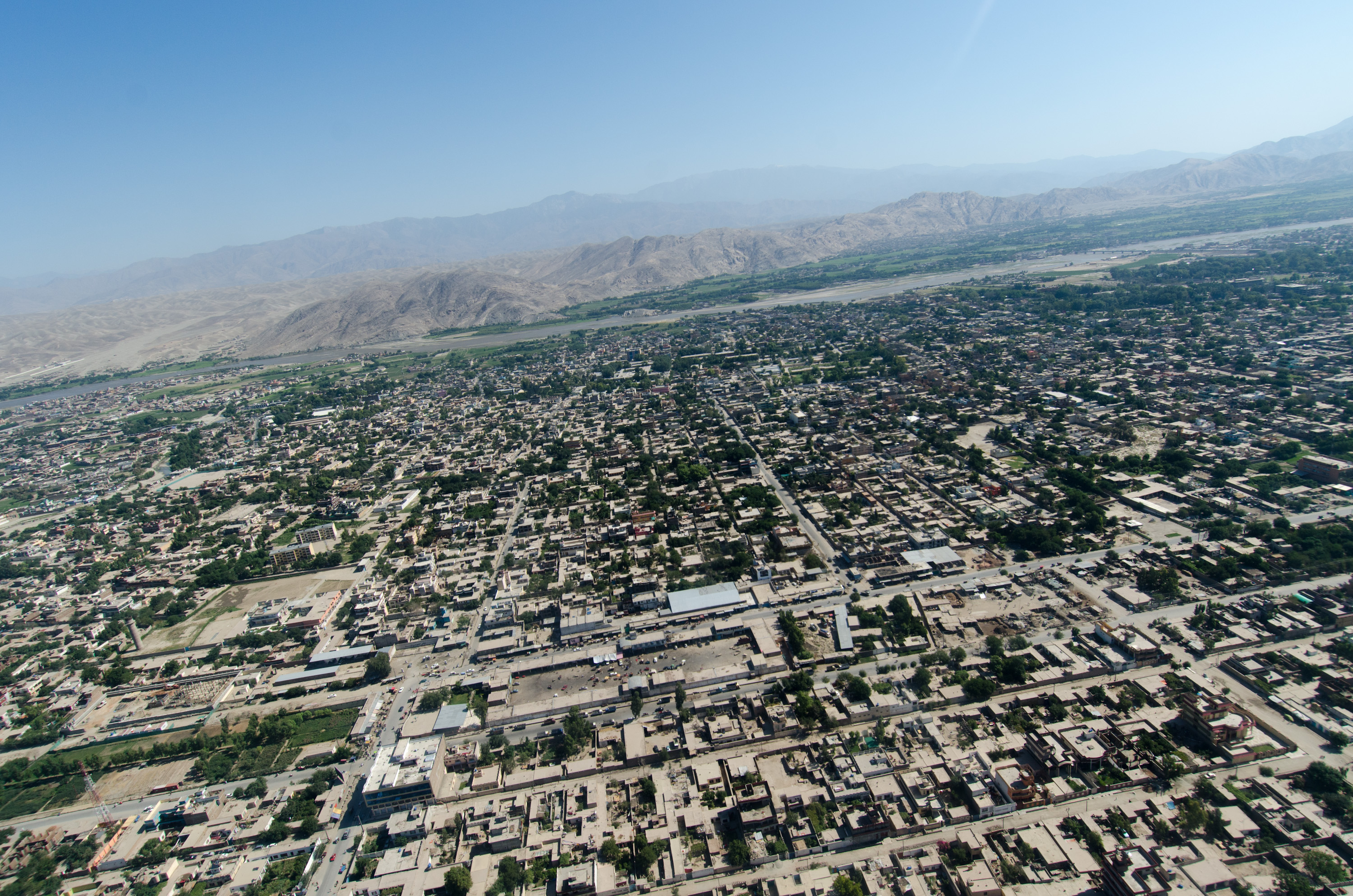
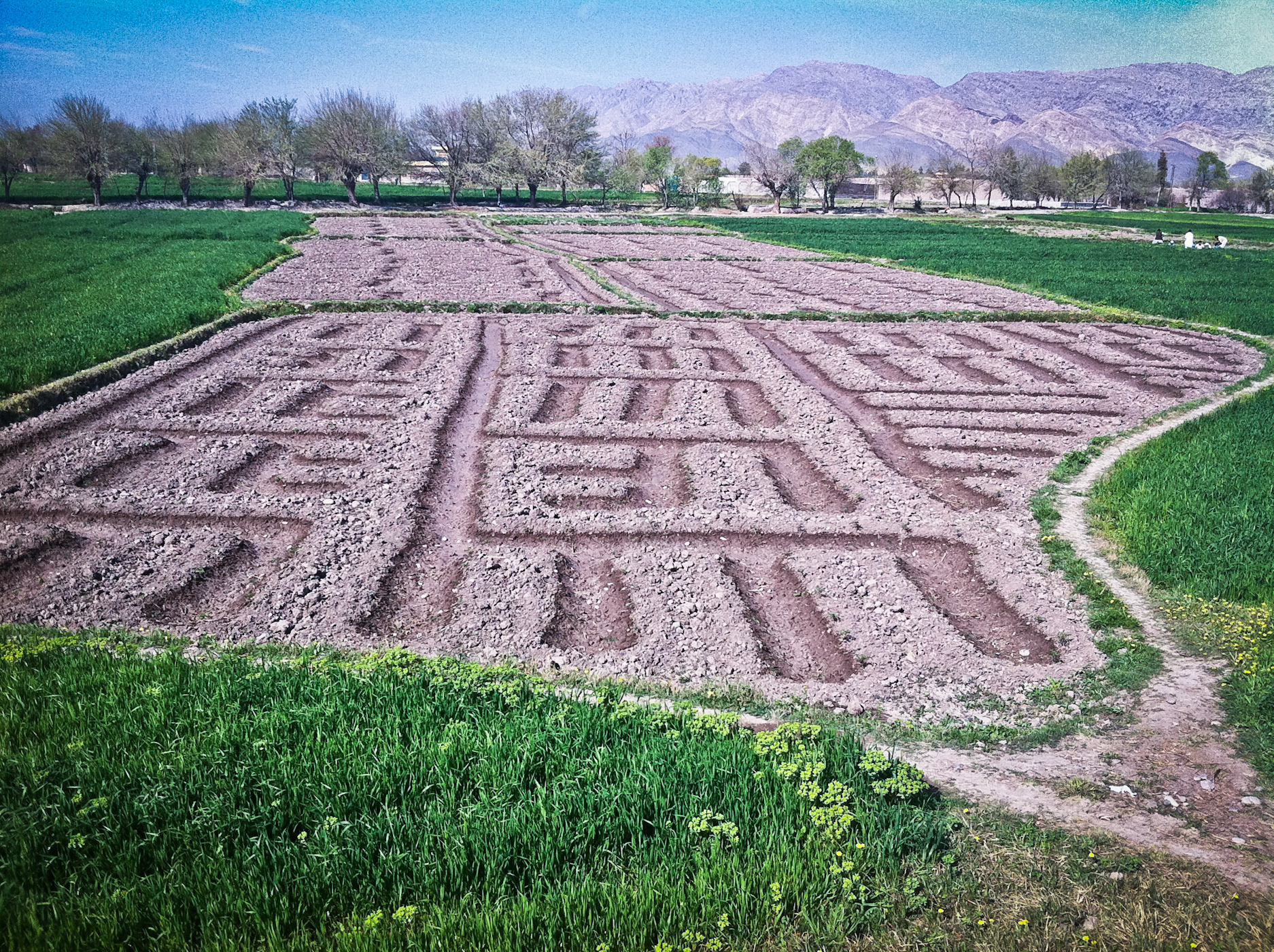
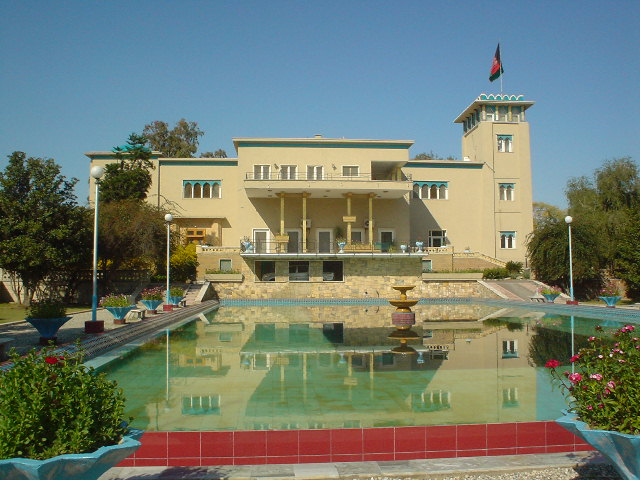
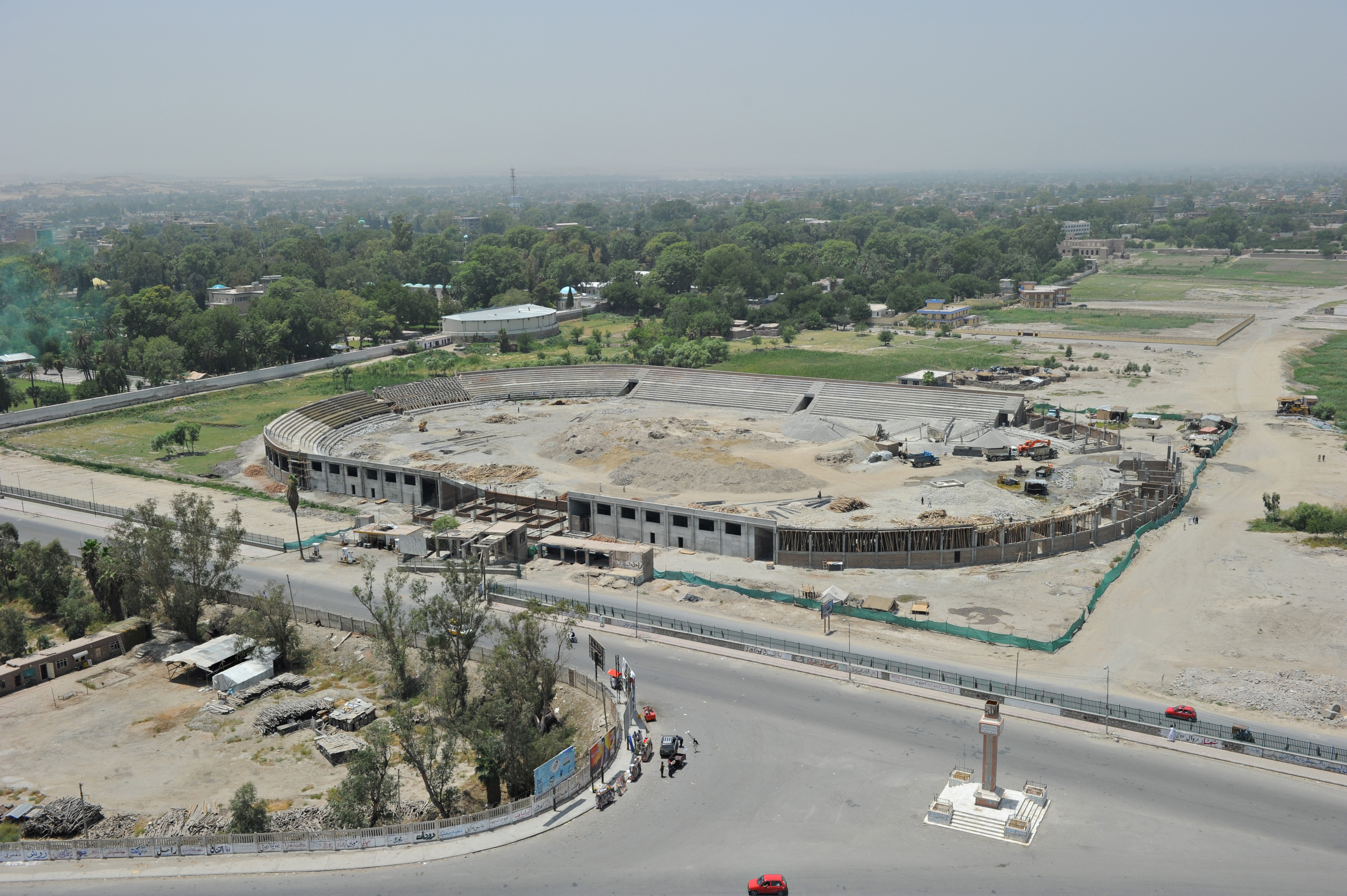
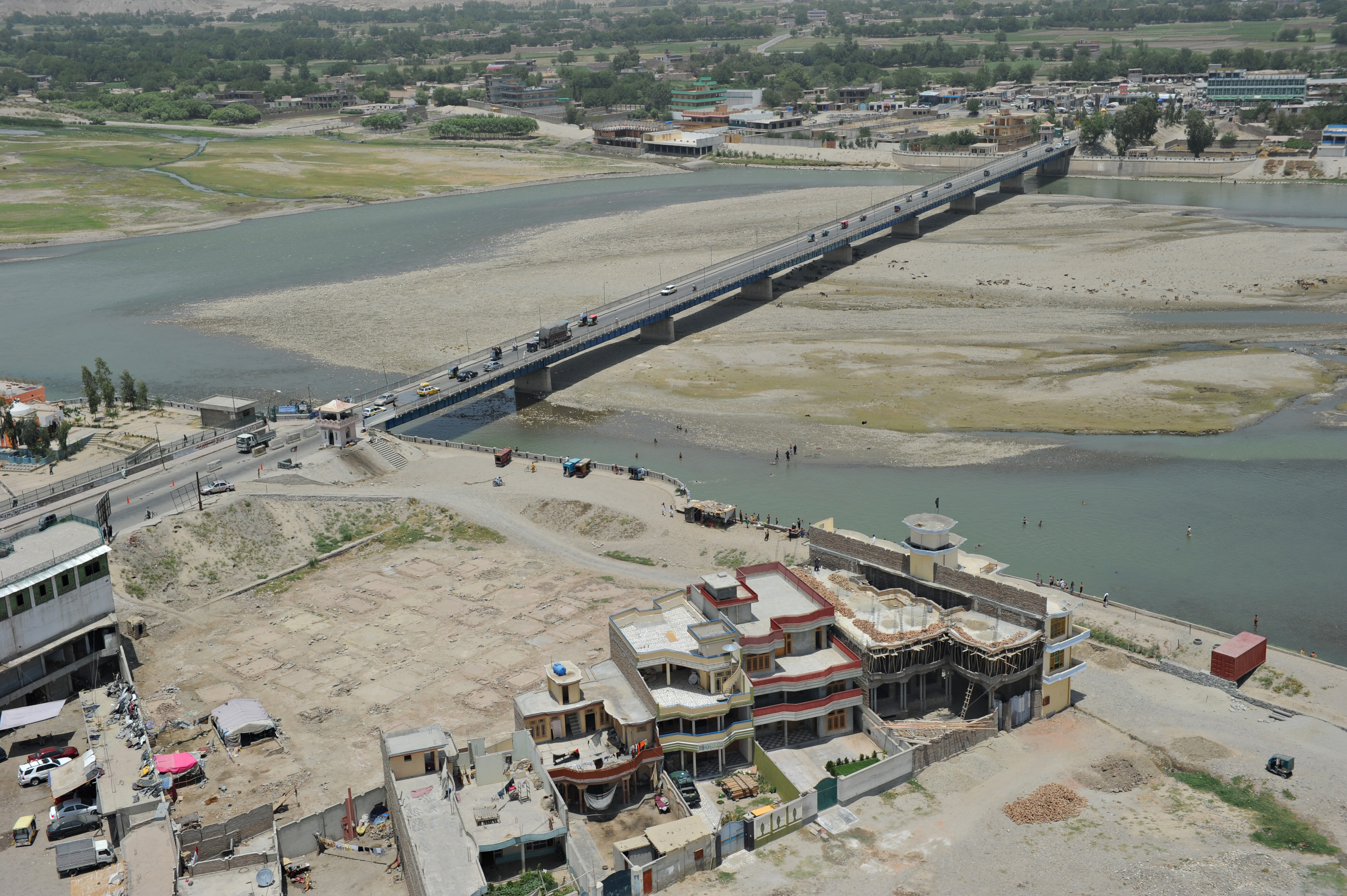
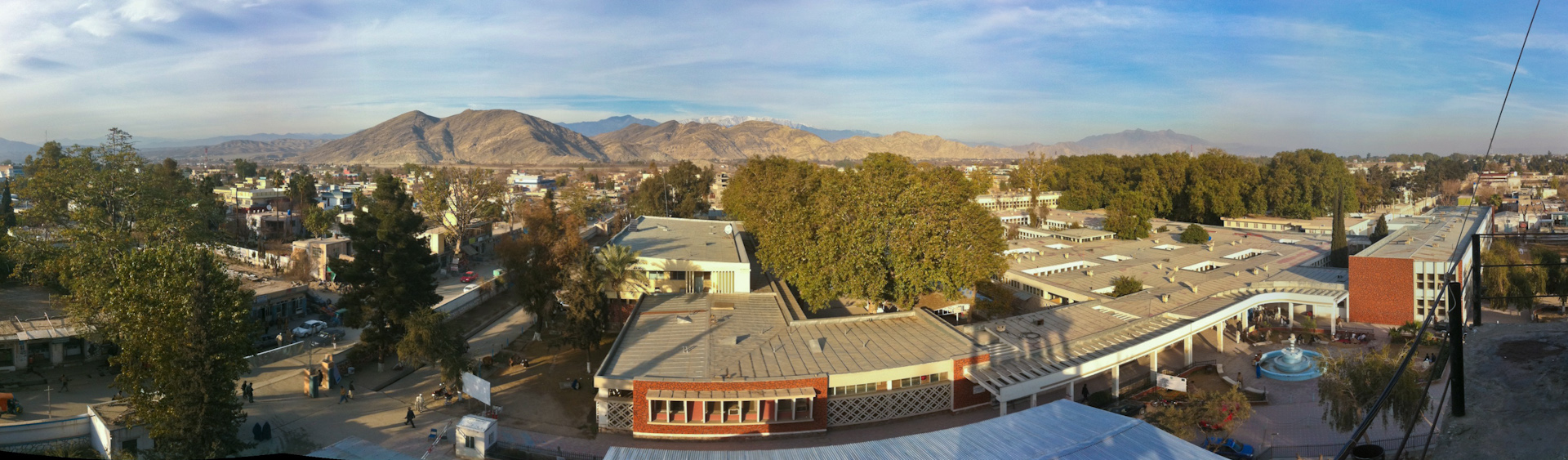
- From top counter-clockwise: An aerial view of a section of Jalalabad, Irrigation fields in Jalalabad, Jalalabad Cricket Stadium, Jalalabad in January 2011, Jalalabad Bridge, Governor's House in Jalalabad

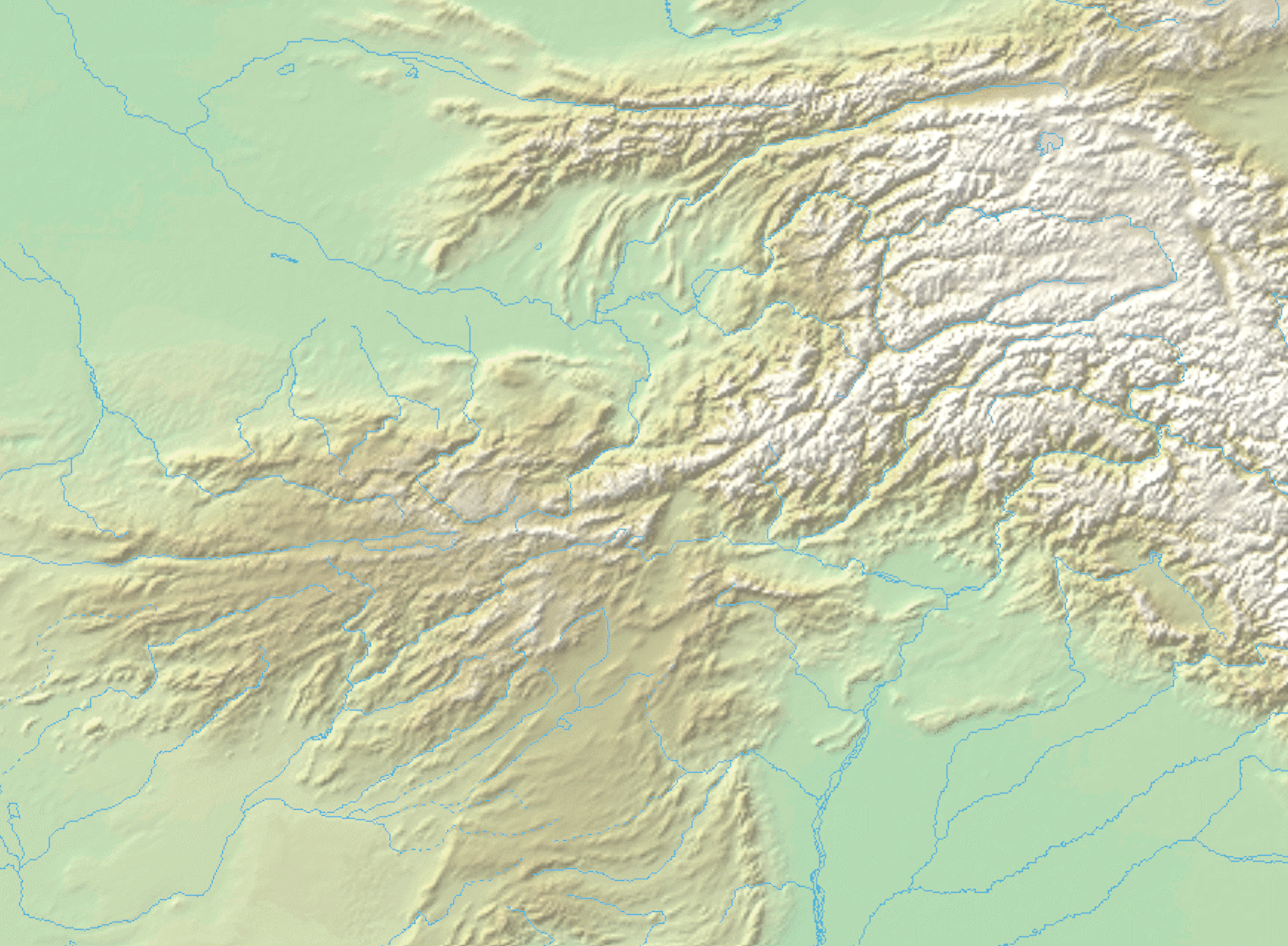
- Location in Afghanistan Jalalabad (Hindu-Kush)
- Coordinates: 34°26′03″N 70°26′52″E
- Country: Afghanistan
- Province: Nangarhar
- District: Jalalabad
- Founded: 1570

Government
  - Type: Municipality
  - Mayor: Qari Bismellah Bilal
  - Deputy Mayor: Mohammad Ishaq Saeed

Area
  - Land: 122 km^{2} (47 sq mi)
- Elevation: 575 m (1,886 ft)

Population (2025)
  - Provincial capital: 318,733
  - Density: 2,610/km^{2} (6,770/sq mi)
  - Urban: 318,733
- Time zone: UTC+04:30 (Afghanistan Time)
- ISO 3166 code: AF-JAA
- Climate: BWh
- Website: jalalabad-m.gov.af

Jalalabad, (Note: /dʒəˈlæləˌbæd/) (Note: Pashto: جلال آباد, romanized: Jalāl Ābād [d͡ʒa.lɑ'lɑ.bɑd]; Dari: جلال‌آباد, romanized: Jalāl Ābād [d͡ʒä.lɑː.lɑː.bɑːd̪]) previously known as Tarunshahr, and historically known as Nagarahara or Adinapur, is a city in eastern Afghanistan, serving as the capital of Nangarhar Province. It has an estimated population of 318,733 people. Qari Bismellah Bilal is the current mayor of the city. Mohammad Ishaq Saeed serves as the current deputy mayor.

Jalalabad is home to Nangarhar University, which is in the northwestern area of the city. The Jalalabad Airport is in the southeastern part of the city. Jalalabad has a number of industrial parks, bazaars, business centers, public parks, banks, hotels, restaurants, mosques, hospitals, universities, and places to play sports or just relax. The city is connected by a road network with Asadabad to the northeast, Torkham to the southeast, and Kabul to the west. It is about 80 mi (130 km) from the city of Kabul.

Jalalabad is located at the junction of the Kabul River and the Kunar River in a plateau to the south of the Hindu Kush mountains. It is a leading center of social and trade activity because of its proximity with the Torkham border checkpoint and border crossing, 65 km (40 mi) away. Major industries include poultry farming, processing agricultural products such as dried fruits, olives, dates, oranges and sugarcane, and producing household products and various types of snacks. For centuries the city was favored by Afghan kings and it has a cultural significance in Afghan poetry. During Timur Shah's reign of the Durrani Empire, Jalalabad served as the Afghan winter capital.

== History ==
=== Ancient and medieval ===
Known at the time by names such as Nagarahara and Adinapur, Jalalabad was a major center of Greco-Buddhist culture during the late 1st millennium BCE, focused on sites such as Ahin Posh.

The first surviving references to the city are in early 1st millennium CE accounts by visiting Chinese Buddhist monks. In or about 400 CE, Faxian visited "Nagarahara" and worshiped at sacred Buddhist sites, such as the "Cave of the Buddha's Shadow” (佛影窟). In 630 CE, Xuan Zang, visited "Adinapur" and other locations nearby.

The Buddhist era began to end after the region was conquered by Muslim forces during the late 1st millennium. However, complete conversions to Islam evidently did not occur quickly. In Hudud-al-Alam, written in 982 CE, there is reference to a village near Jalalabad where a local ruler had Muslim, Buddhist and Hindu wives.

The region became part of the Muslim Ghaznavid Empire in the 10th century. Sabuktigin annexed the land all the way west of the Neelum River in Kashmir. "The Afghans and Khiljies who resided among the mountains having taken the oath of allegiance to Sabuktigin, many of them were enlisted in his army, after which he returned in triumph to Ghazni." The Ghurids succeeded the Ghaznavids and expanded the Islamic culture further into Hindustan. The region around Jalalabad later became part of the Khalji territory, followed by that of the Timurids.

=== Modern ===
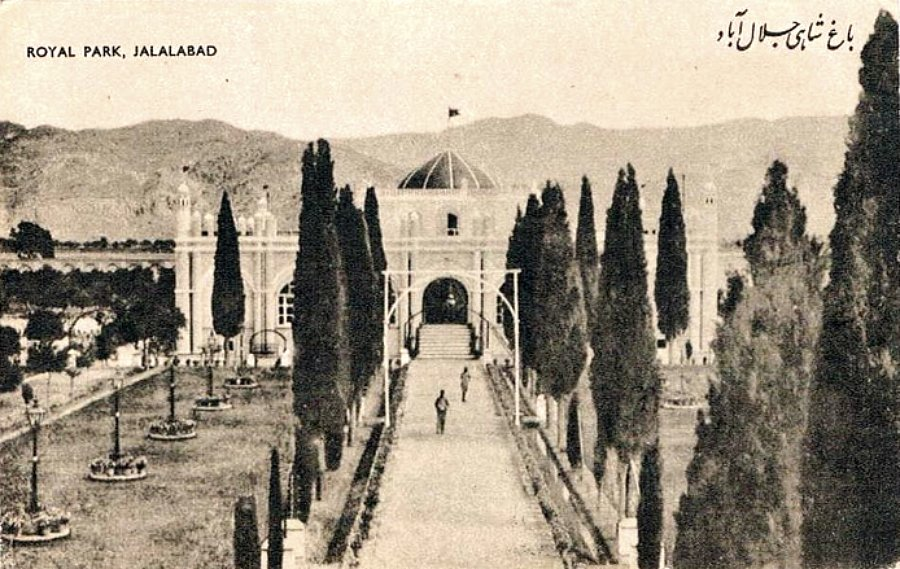
The Bagh-e Shahi palace and gardens, c. 1920.

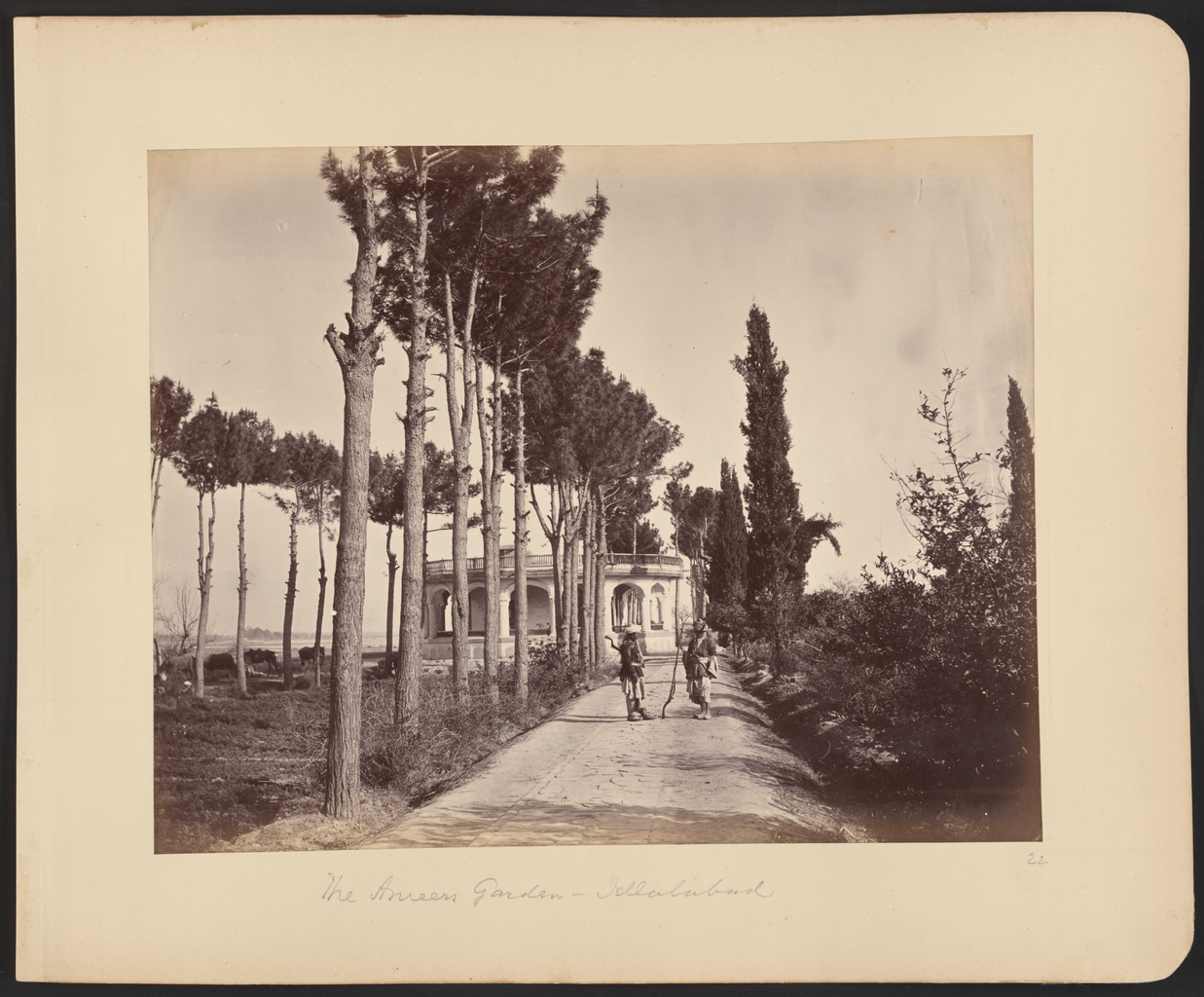
The Emir's gardens, pictured in the 19th century.

It is said that the original name of Jalalabad was Adinapur or Nagar(a)hara. Jalalabad was named in the last decade of the sixteenth century in honor of Jalal-uddin Mohammad Akbar, ruler of the Mughal Empire at the time. His grandfather Babur had chosen the site for this city which was built by his grandson.

It remained part of the Mughal Empire until around 1738 when Nader Shah and his Afsharid forces defeated the Mughals. Nader Shah's forces were accompanied by the young Ahmad Shah Durrani and his 4,000-strong Afghan army from southern Afghanistan. In 1747, he founded the Durrani Empire (Afghan Empire) after re-conquering the area. The Afghan army has long used the city while going back and forth during their military campaigns into Hindustan.

In 1834, Dost Mohammad Khan subjugated Jalalabad in his campaign to Jalalabad. The British-Indian forces invaded Jalalabad in 1838, during the First Anglo-Afghan War. In the 1842 Battle of Jellalabad, Akbar Khan besieged the British troops on their way to Jalalabad. In 1878, during the Second Anglo-Afghan War, the British again invaded and set up camps in Jalalabad but withdrew two years later.

Jalalabad was besieged by rebel tribes in November 1928, marking the start of the Afghan Civil War of 1928-1929.

Jalalabad is considered one of the most important cities of the Pashtun culture. Seraj-ul-Emarat, the residence of Amir Habibullah and King Amanullah was destroyed in 1929 when Habibullah Kalakani rose to power; the other sanctuaries however, retain vestiges of the past. The mausoleum of both rulers is enclosed by a garden facing Seraj-ul-Emart. The Sulaimankhels, a Pashtun family famous for their scientific research, is from Jalalabad. Other celebrated Pashtun families originate from the villages near Jalalabad too.

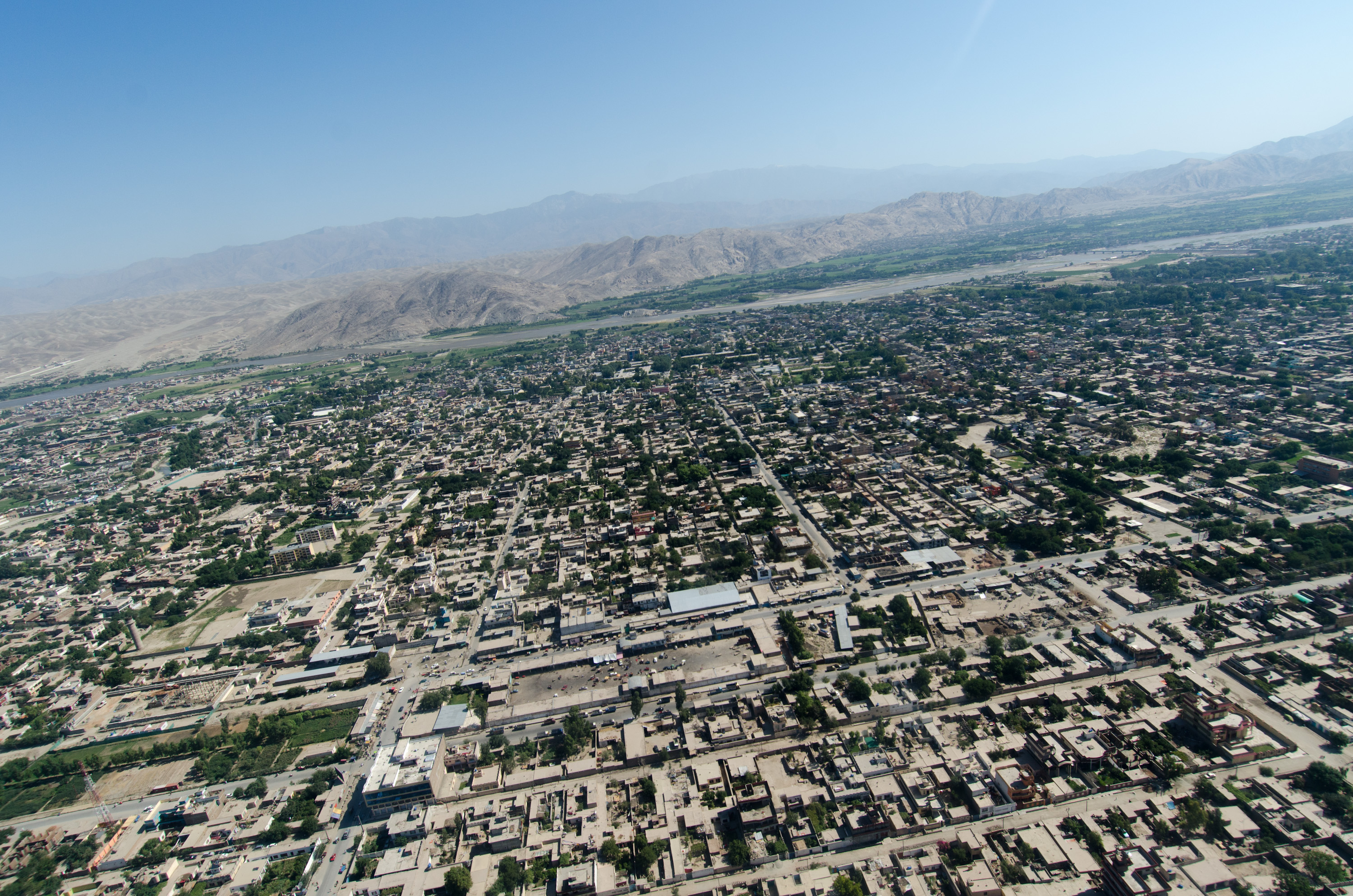
Aerial view of Jalalabad

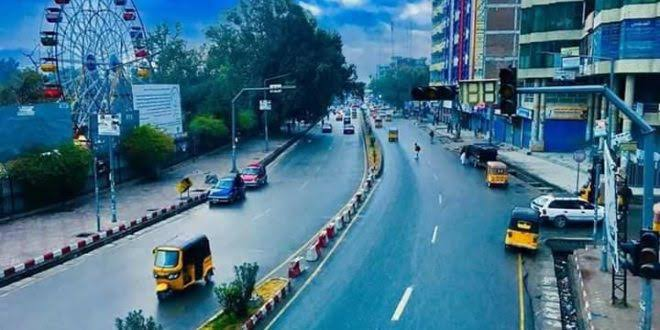
One of the main roads where movements of auto rickshaws have been banned

By the early 1970s, construction had started on a new planned community within Jalalabad called Reg-e Shamshad Khan. From 1978 to early 1990s, the city served as a strategic location for the Soviet-backed Democratic Republic of Afghanistan and was temporarily renamed to Tarunshahr, in honour of Daoud Tarun. In March 1989, two mujahideen rebel factions backed by Pakistan and the United States assaulted the city during the Battle of Jalalabad. However, government forces managed to drive them out within two months, which was a major setback to the rebel fighters and Pakistan's ISI. The city was heavily bombarded and hundreds of civilians were killed. Many buildings, such as schools, hospitals and public buildings were destroyed during the 2-month battle.

On April 19, 1992, after then-President Najibullah resigned, Jalalabad fell to mujahideen rebel forces under Yunus Khalis. On September 12, 1996, the Taliban took control of the city until they were toppled by the US-backed Afghan forces in late 2001, which resulted in the Afghan Interim Administration under Hamid Karzai taking control. According to the United States, al-Qaeda had been building military training camps in the area.

In March 2007, US marines murdered 19 unarmed civilians and wounded 50 near Jalalabad, in an incident compared by The New York Times to the Haditha massacre. None of those responsible received any serious punishment. The Jalalabad Airport has long served as a military base for the NATO forces. Many suicide attacks by jihadist insurgents have taken place, including in August 2013, April 2015, January 2018, July 2018, September 2018, October 2019 and August 2020. The groups responsible for the attacks include the Taliban, Haqqani Network, al-Qaeda, and ISIS (Daesh). On August 15, 2021, the Taliban took control of Kabul and Jalalabad.

== Geography ==
Jalalabad is a strategic city in eastern Afghanistan. It connects by a road network with Asadabad to the northeast, Torkham to the southeast, and Kabul to the west. It is at an elevation of 575 m (1,886 ft) above sea level, next to where the Kunar River merges into the Kabul River. The city is administratively divided into 6 city districts (nahias), covering a land area of 122 km^{2} (47 sq mi) or 12,796 ha (31,620 acres).

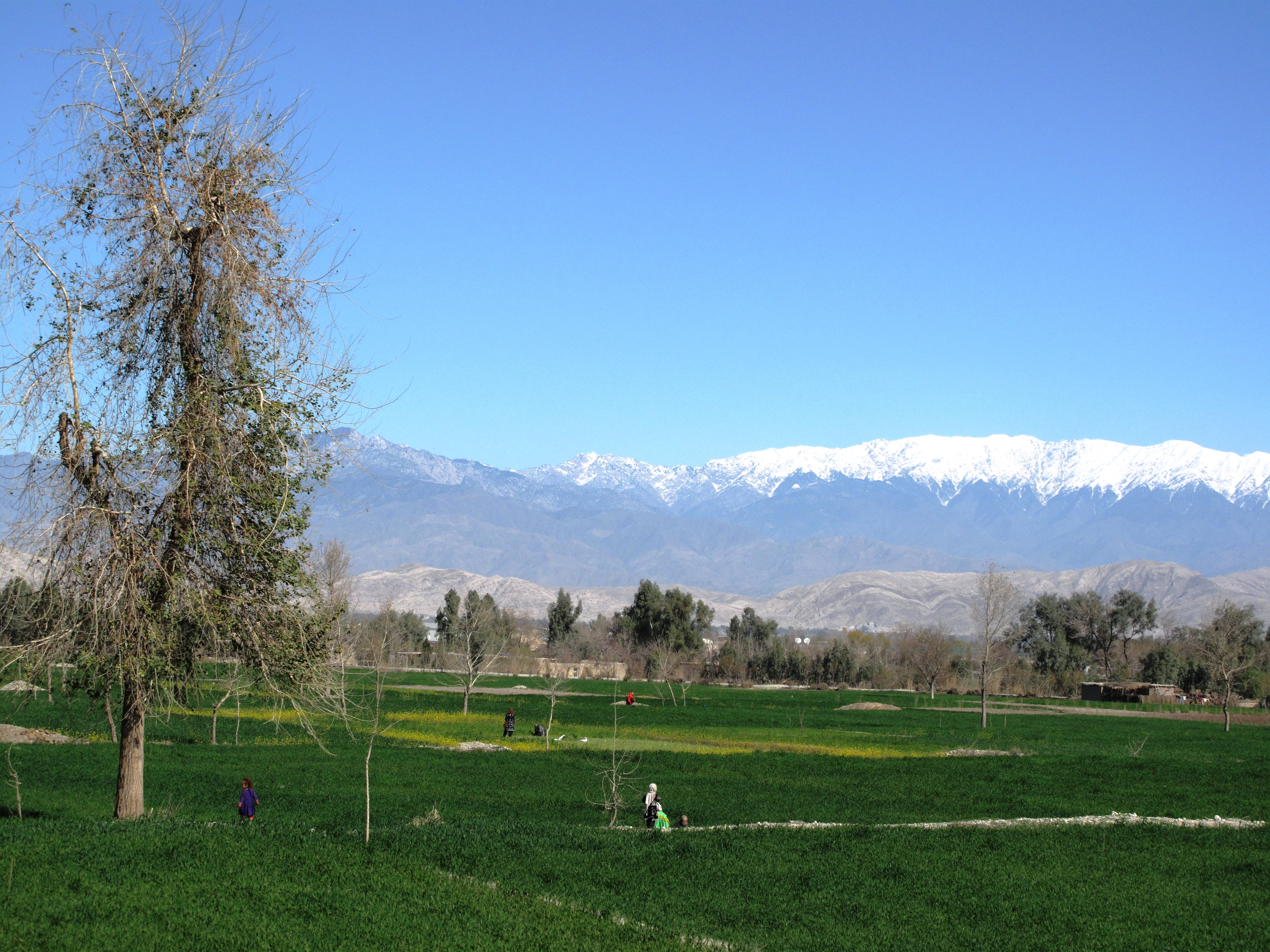
View of the Spin Ghar range from the city of Jalalabad

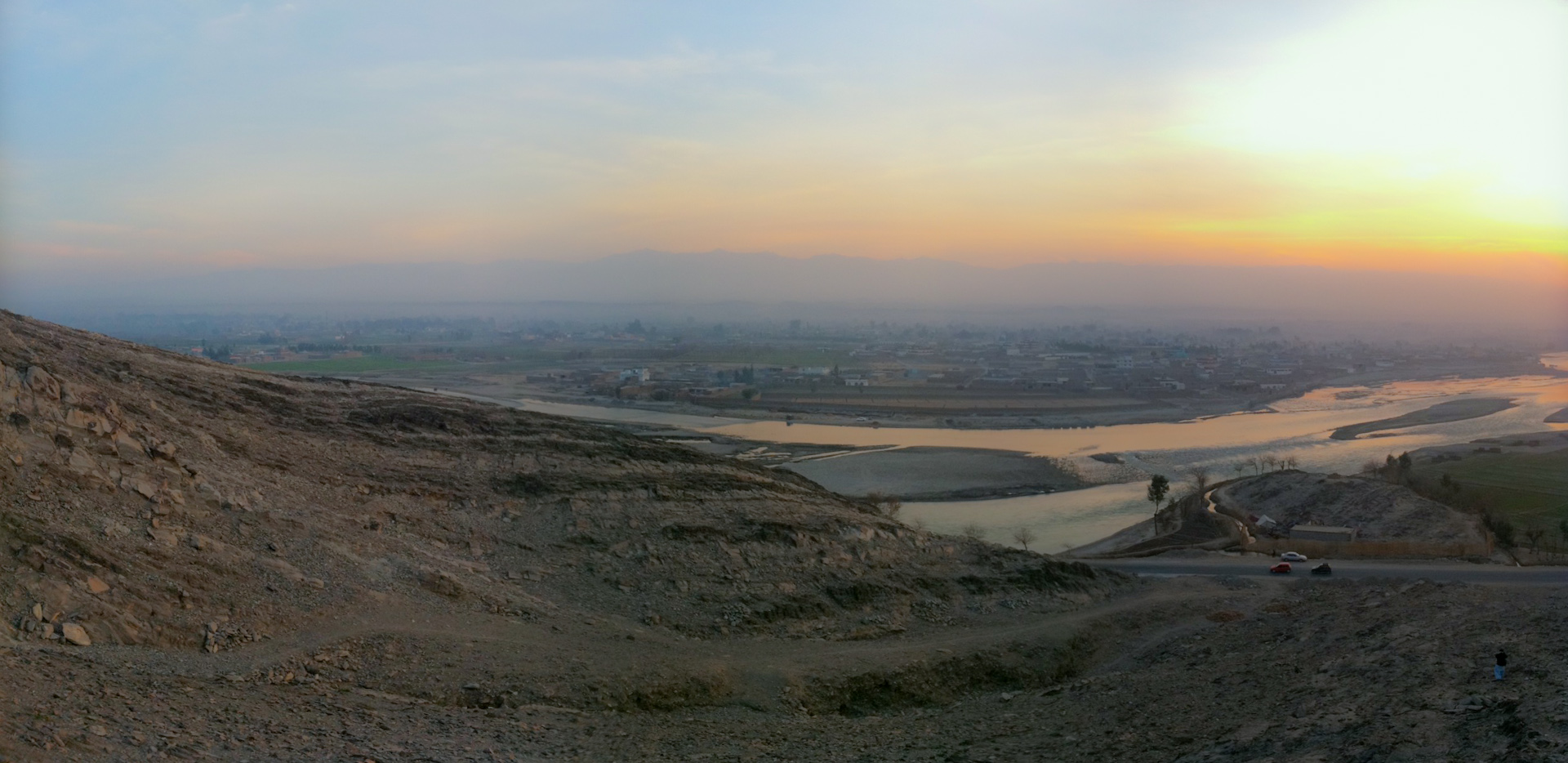
View towards the city from the Kabul River banks to the north

Agriculture is the predominant land use at 44%, higher density of dwellings is found in Districts 1–5 and vacant plots are largely clustered in District 6. Districts 1–6 all have a grid network of roads.

=== Flora and fauna ===
Jalalabad is home to a large number of fruit. Various types of citrus fruits like orange, tangerine, grapefruit, lemon, lime grow in gardens as well as in orchards. The narindj variety of orange is the most common one which has yellow skin and its taste is a combination of orange and grapefruit. The grapefruits grown here have a diameter of eight or nine inches. Per year 1800 tonnes of pomegranates, 334 tonnes of grapes, and 7750 tonnes of mulberries are produced in Jalalabad. The fruits are sold in local markets and transported to Kabul markets from where they are exported. The second most common crop is local vatani variety of sugarcane. It contains 15% sugar by weight. Jalalabad also has one of the largest date farms in Afghanistan.

=== Climate ===
Jalalabad's climate is hot desert (Köppen: BWh), and it is one of the hottest localities in Afghanistan. The city's climate has close resemblance to that of Arizona in the United States. It receives six to eight inches (152 to 203 mm) of rainfall per annum which are limited to winter and the months of spring. Frosts are not common, and during the summer, the temperature can reach a maximum of 120 °F (49 °C).

The north and southwestern parts of the city which has lower elevation are welcoming places to winds from the north and west cooling the parts in summer months. Jalalabad has the highest relative humidity in summer compared to other Afghan cities. However, the moderate temperatures of winter has led to various people down the history establishing their settlements in the city. Because of its warm temperature relative to most of Afghanistan, Jalalabad (alongside Peshawar) was often the "winter capital" of various Afghan rulers of the past centuries, while rich people would relocate to villas in Jalalabad to avoid the freezing temperatures in Kabul.

Climate data for Jalalabad
Month	Jan	Feb	Mar	Apr	May	Jun	Jul	Aug	Sep	Oct	Nov	Dec	Year
Record high °C (°F)	25.0 (77.0)	28.8 (83.8)	34.5 (94.1)	40.5 (104.9)	45.4 (113.7)	47.5 (117.5)	44.7 (112.5)	42.4 (108.3)	41.2 (106.2)	38.2 (100.8)	32.4 (90.3)	25.4 (77.7)	47.5 (117.5)
Mean daily maximum °C (°F)	15.9 (60.6)	17.9 (64.2)	22.5 (72.5)	28.3 (82.9)	34.7 (94.5)	40.4 (104.7)	39.3 (102.7)	38.0 (100.4)	35.2 (95.4)	30.5 (86.9)	23.3 (73.9)	17.5 (63.5)	28.6 (83.5)
Daily mean °C (°F)	8.5 (47.3)	10.9 (51.6)	16.3 (61.3)	21.9 (71.4)	27.7 (81.9)	32.7 (90.9)	32.8 (91.0)	31.9 (89.4)	28.1 (82.6)	22.2 (72.0)	14.9 (58.8)	9.5 (49.1)	21.5 (70.6)
Mean daily minimum °C (°F)	2.9 (37.2)	5.6 (42.1)	10.5 (50.9)	15.3 (59.5)	19.8 (67.6)	24.7 (76.5)	26.7 (80.1)	26.2 (79.2)	21.4 (70.5)	14.4 (57.9)	6.9 (44.4)	3.5 (38.3)	14.8 (58.7)
Record low °C (°F)	−14.1 (6.6)	−9.5 (14.9)	−1.0 (30.2)	6.1 (43.0)	10.6 (51.1)	13.5 (56.3)	19.0 (66.2)	17.5 (63.5)	11.0 (51.8)	2.7 (36.9)	−4.5 (23.9)	−5.5 (22.1)	−14.1 (6.6)
Average precipitation mm (inches)	18.1 (0.71)	24.3 (0.96)	39.2 (1.54)	36.4 (1.43)	16.0 (0.63)	1.4 (0.06)	6.9 (0.27)	7.7 (0.30)	8.3 (0.33)	3.2 (0.13)	8.3 (0.33)	12.1 (0.48)	181.9 (7.17)
Average rainy days	4	5	8	8	4	1	1	1	1	1	2	3	39
Average relative humidity (%)	61	60	62	59	47	40	52	58	56	55	58	63	56
Mean monthly sunshine hours	180.9	182.7	207.1	227.8	304.8	339.6	325.9	299.7	293.6	277.6	231.0	185.6	3,056.3
Source: NOAA (1964–1983)

== Demographics ==
Jalalabad has an estimated population of 318,733 people. In 2015 there were 39,586 dwelling units in the city.

Nearly all residents of Jalalabad are Muslim, followers of Sunni Islam. The city also has some Sikhs and Hindus, although the community has dwindled since the 1980s.

== Economy ==
Jalalabad has a number of industrial parks. There are at least two steel mills in the city. Major industries in the city include poultry farming, processing agricultural products such as nuts and dried fruits, olive products, dates, oranges, sugarcane, and producing household products and various types of snacks.

=== Transportation ===
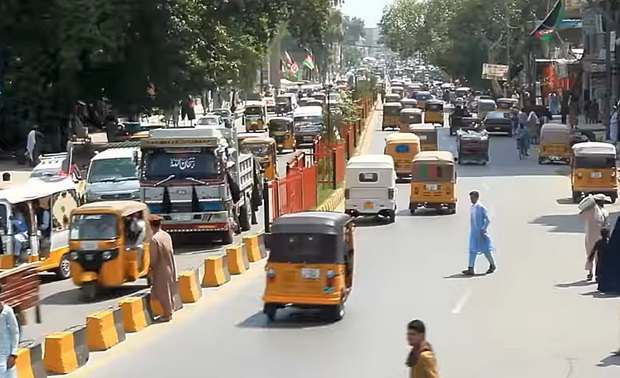
Auto rickshaws in Jalalabad

Jalalabad is connected by a road network with Asadabad to the northeast, Torkham to the southeast, and Kabul to west. The Kabul–Jalalabad Road is heavily used day and night, and still remains dangerous due to many accidents and the occasional rock falling from the high mountains. In January 2026 the city banned all auto rickshaw movements on the main roads in the city's center.

The Jalalabad Airport (also known as Nangarhar Airport) is located roughly 3 mi (4.8 km) southeast from the city's center. It is a domestic airport for civilian use. It serves the population of the provinces of Nangarhar, Kunar and Nuristan.

There is a proposal for the establishment of a railway from Mazar-i-Sharif in Balkh Province to Jalalabad and then to Torkham in Momand Dara District.

== Education ==
There are a number of public and private schools in Jalalabad. The following is a list of some of the universities in the city.

- Alfalah University
- Ariana University
- Khurasan University
- Nangarhar University
- Spinghar Higher Education Centre

== Sports ==
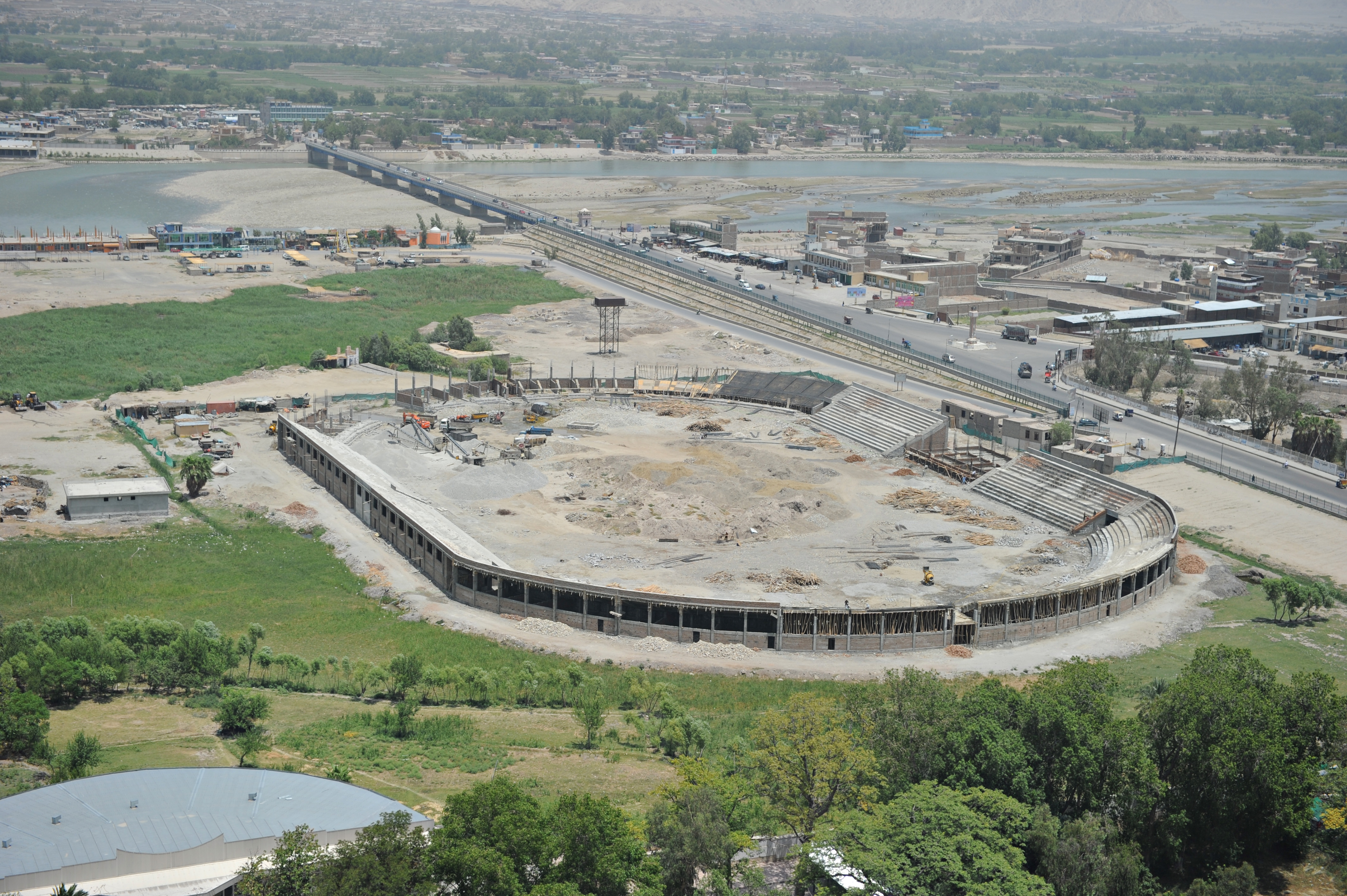
Nangarhar Football Stadium (during construction in 2011)

Cricket, football, futsal and volleyball are the most popular sports in Afghanistan. Jalalabad is represented in domestic cricket competitions by the Nangarhar province cricket team. National team member Hamid Hasan was born in the province and he currently represents Afghanistan in international cricket. The Ghazi Amanullah International Cricket Stadium is the first international standard cricket stadium in Afghanistan. It is located in the Ghazi Amanullah Town, a modern suburb on the southeastern fringe of Jalalabad in Nangarhar Province. Construction on the stadium began in March 2010 when the foundation stone was laid by Omar Zakhilwal, the then-Minister of Finance and President of the Afghanistan Cricket Board. The project, which was developed on 30 acres of land donated by the developer constructing the Ghazi Amanullah Town, cost up the first phase of construction $1.8 million. The first phase, which took one year to complete, included the completion of the stadium itself. The remainder of the phases will see the construction of a pavilion, accommodation for players and administrative buildings. The stadium, which has a capacity of 14,000, was completed before the national team and under-19 team left for Canada and the Under-19 Cricket World Cup Qualifier in Ireland respectively. The two sides inaugurated the stadium in a Twenty20 match. It is hoped that the stadium will be able to attract international teams to play Afghanistan, who currently have One Day International status until at least 2013.

Professional sports teams from Jalalabad

Club	League	Sport	Venue	Established
Nangarhar Leopards	Afghanistan Premier League	Cricket	Sharjah Cricket Stadium	2018
Speenghar Tigers	Shpageeza Cricket League	Cricket	Ghazi Amanullah International Cricket Stadium	2013
De Spin Ghar Bazan F.C.	Afghan Premier League	Football	Nangarhar Football Stadium	2012

Stadiums

- Ghazi Amanullah International Cricket Stadium (around 15 mi (24 km) southeast from Jalalabad, next to Ghazi Amanullah Town)
- Nangarhar Football Stadium (next to Abdul Haq Park and House of Governor)
- Behsud Cricket Stadium (next to Abdul Haq Park and House of Governor)

== Places of interest ==
The Ghazi Amanullah International Cricket Stadium is next to the Ghazi Amanullah Khan Town, which is about 15 mi (24 km) of driving distance southeast of Jalalabad. Some people of Jalalabad go there for sports purposes while others for leisure and enjoyment purposes. This is especially during holidays or when they receive visitors.

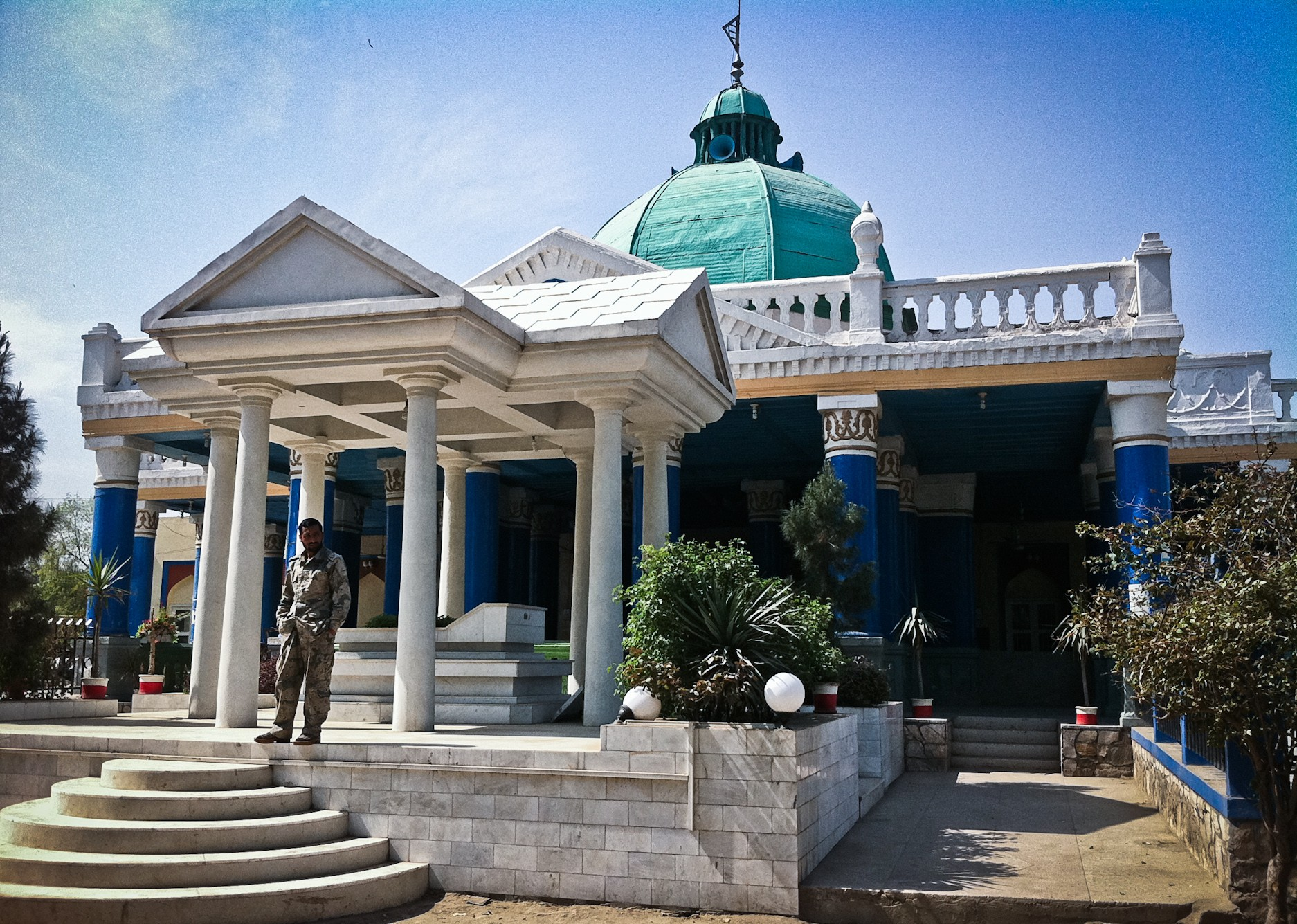
Mausoleum of King Amanullah Khan inside the Siraj-ul-Emarat Park

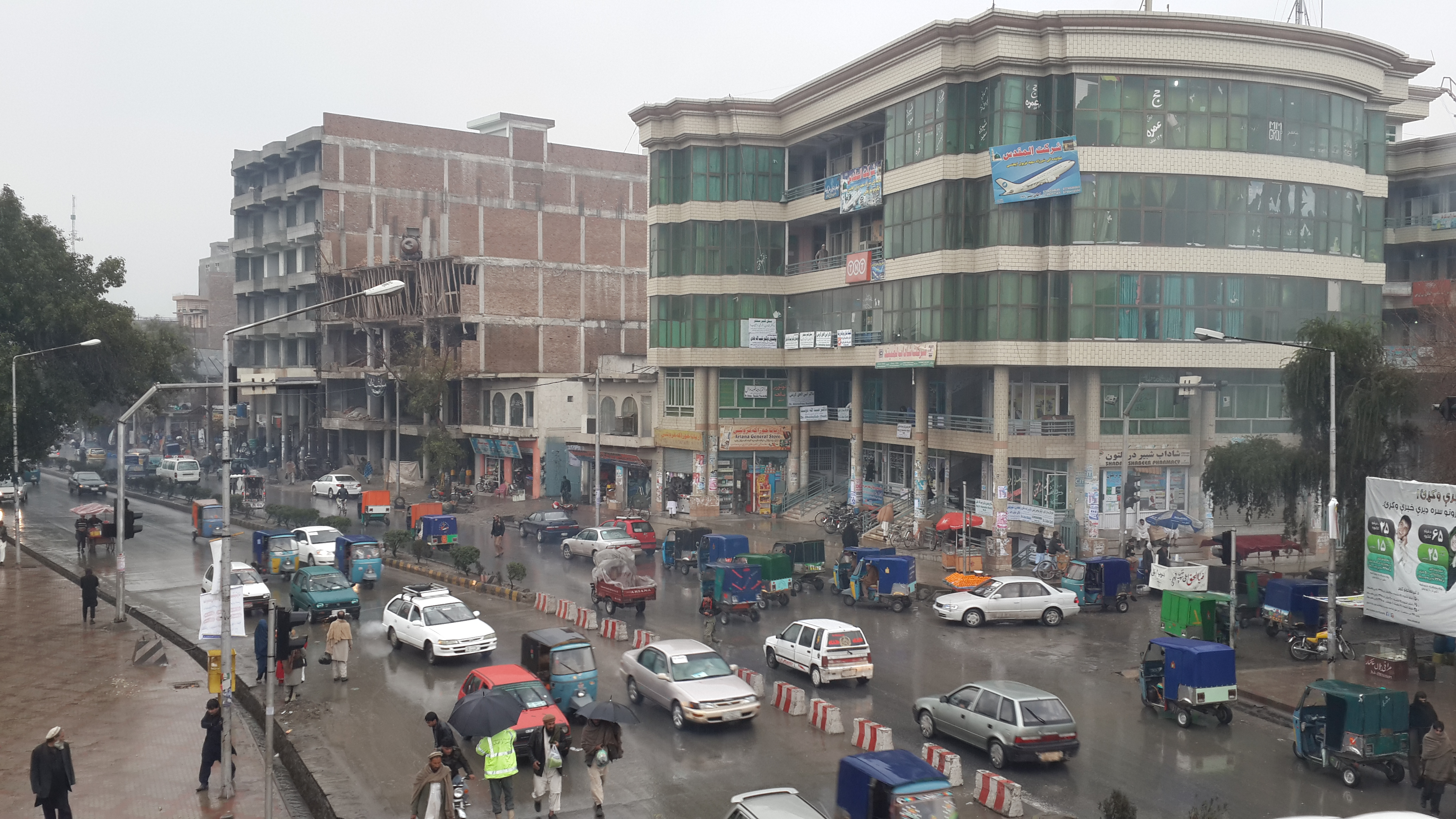
A shopping area next to Siraj-ul-Emarat Park

The following are some of the places of interest.

- Hotels
  - Spinghar Hotel
  - Sultan Hotel and Restaurant
  - White House Hotel
- Mosques
  - Akhunzada Mosque
  - Spin Mosque
- Parks and Gardens
  - Abdul Haq Park (located next to the city's main stadiums)
  - Amir Habibullah Khan Park (across the street from Siraj-ul-Emarat Park)
  - Aryan Park (located in the southwestern section of the city)
  - Farm Hada Park (located in southern part of the city)
  - Nakamura Park
  - Siraj-ul-Emarat Park (located next to House of Governor)
- Mausoleums
  - Mausoleum of King Amanullah Khan (Siraj-ul-Emarat Park)
  - Mausoleum of Khan Abdul Ghaffar Khan
  - Mausoleum of Mohammad Gul Khan Momand
- Hospitals
  - Al Shifa Modern Hospital
  - Bakhtar Hospital
  - Baidara Hospital
  - Hassanzai Curative Hospital
  - Jalalabad Regional Hospital
  - Jalalabad Medical Complex
  - Khair-un-Nisa Medical Complex
  - Spingha Momand Hospital
  - Malalai Curative Hospital
  - Nangarhar Teaching Hospital
  - Naseri Hospital
  - Rokhan Hospital
- Shopping centers
  - Hejaz Super Market
  - Jada Super Store
  - Nakamura Super Store

== International sister cities ==
- San Diego, California, United States

== Notable people ==
- Rashid Khan, Afghan cricketer
- Abdul Baqi Haqqani, former Minister of Higher Education
- Hazrat Ali, politician and former military commander for the Northern Alliance
- Haji Abdul Qadeer, former Vice President of Afghanistan and Northern Alliance leader
- Abdul Haq, leader of a mujahideen faction
- Din Mohammad, former governor of Nangarhar and Kabul provinces
- Zahir Qadeer, former politician and member of the National Assembly
- Hamidullah Enayat Seraj, former civil servant
- Latif Nangarhari, poet and singer
- Ezatullah Zawab, journalist for Pajhwok Afghan News
- Baz Mohammad Abid, poet
- Amanullah Khan, Emir and King of Afghanistan (1919–1929), buried in the city
- Abdul Ghaffar Khan, buried in the city
- Mohammad Gul Khan Momand, buried in the city
- Tetsu Nakamura, died in the city

== See also ==
- List of cities in Afghanistan
