= Ariana University =

University in Afghanistan

- د آریانا پوهنتون / دانشگاه آریانا
- Other name: Ariana Institute of Higher Education
- Type: Private
- Established: 2004
- Founder: Prof. Abdulhaq Daneshmal - Tahira Danishmal
- Location: Kabul and Jalalabad, Afghanistan

Ariana University (Note: Pashto: د آریانا پوهنتون Dari: دانشگاه آریانا) also known as Ariana Institute of Higher Education, is a private university having two campuses, in Kabul and Jalalabad, Afghanistan. The university was established in 2004 by Abdul Haq Danishmal and his wife Tahira Danishmal for the Afghan refugees who graduated from different refugee schools in Pakistan.
