= Farida Momand =

Afghan physician and politician (born 1965)

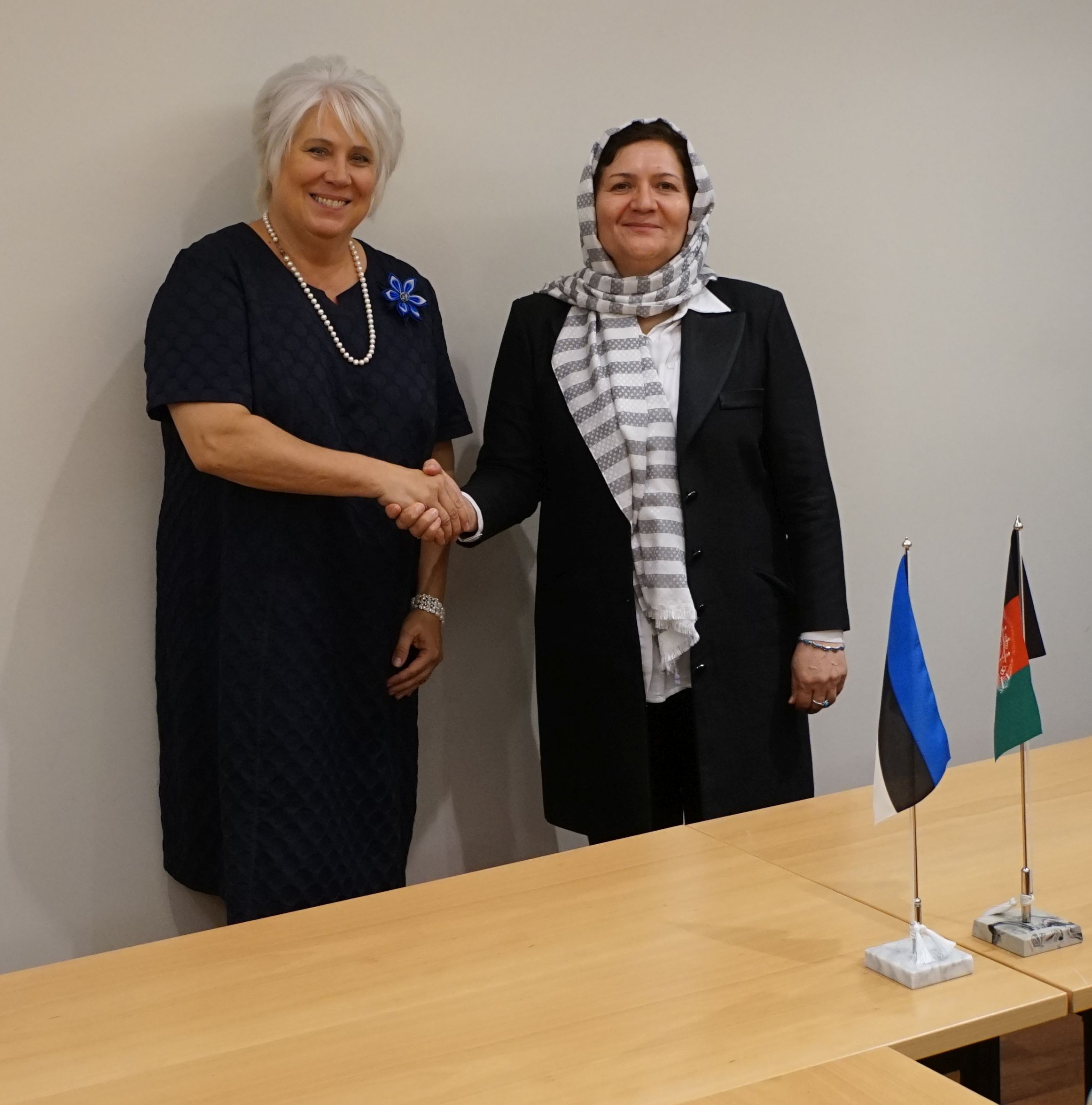
- Farida Momand (right) with Estonian Foreign Affairs Minister Marina Kaljurand in 2016

Minister of Higher Education
- In office 2015–2016

Personal details
- Born: 1965 (age 60–61) Momand Dara, Nangarhar, Afghanistan
- Occupation: Doctor

Farida Momand (born 14 January 1965) is an Afghan doctor and politician who served as Minister of Higher Education from 2015 to 2016.

== Early life and education ==
Momand was born in 1965 in the Momand Dara District of Nangarhar Province. She is of Pashtun descent. She studied at Rabia Balkhi High School and received a BA in Medicine from Kabul University.

== Career ==
Momand is a medical doctor and has worked in several government hospitals. She was a professor at Kabul Medical University. Her husband was a spokesman for the Northern Alliance which sought to keep the Taliban from power. When the Taliban took over Kabul in 1996, the family received death threats and fled to Pakistan. They returned in November 2001, when Kabul was liberated. Momand returned to the medical school and was appointed dean. She was also elected to represent female university students and employees.

Momand was one of more than 400 candidates for Kabul Province in the 2005 parliamentary election. She was also a candidate for the 2009 provincial election and the 2010 parliamentary election.

Momand was appointed as Minister of Higher Education in the cabinet of President Ashraf Ghani in April 2015. As Minister, she called for transparency in university examinations, advocated for women in scholarship, and supported the launch of the first programs in gender studies and women's studies at Kabul University.

In 2016, the Wolesi Jirga began impeachment proceedings for ministers who had failed to spend more than 70% of their development budgets for the year. Momand was one of seven ministers dismissed over four days. She was summoned to report on her development budget spending for the year and when she did not appear on the day, was dismissed in her absence. President Ghani called the dismissals "unjustifiable" and urged the Supreme Court to intervene, while CEO Abdullah Abdullah urged the ministers to keep working until the relevant constitutional article was interpreted.

== Personal life ==
Momand is married to Habib Rayed and they have five children.
