= Khurasan University =

Private university in Jalalabad, Afghanistan

- خراسان پوهنتون
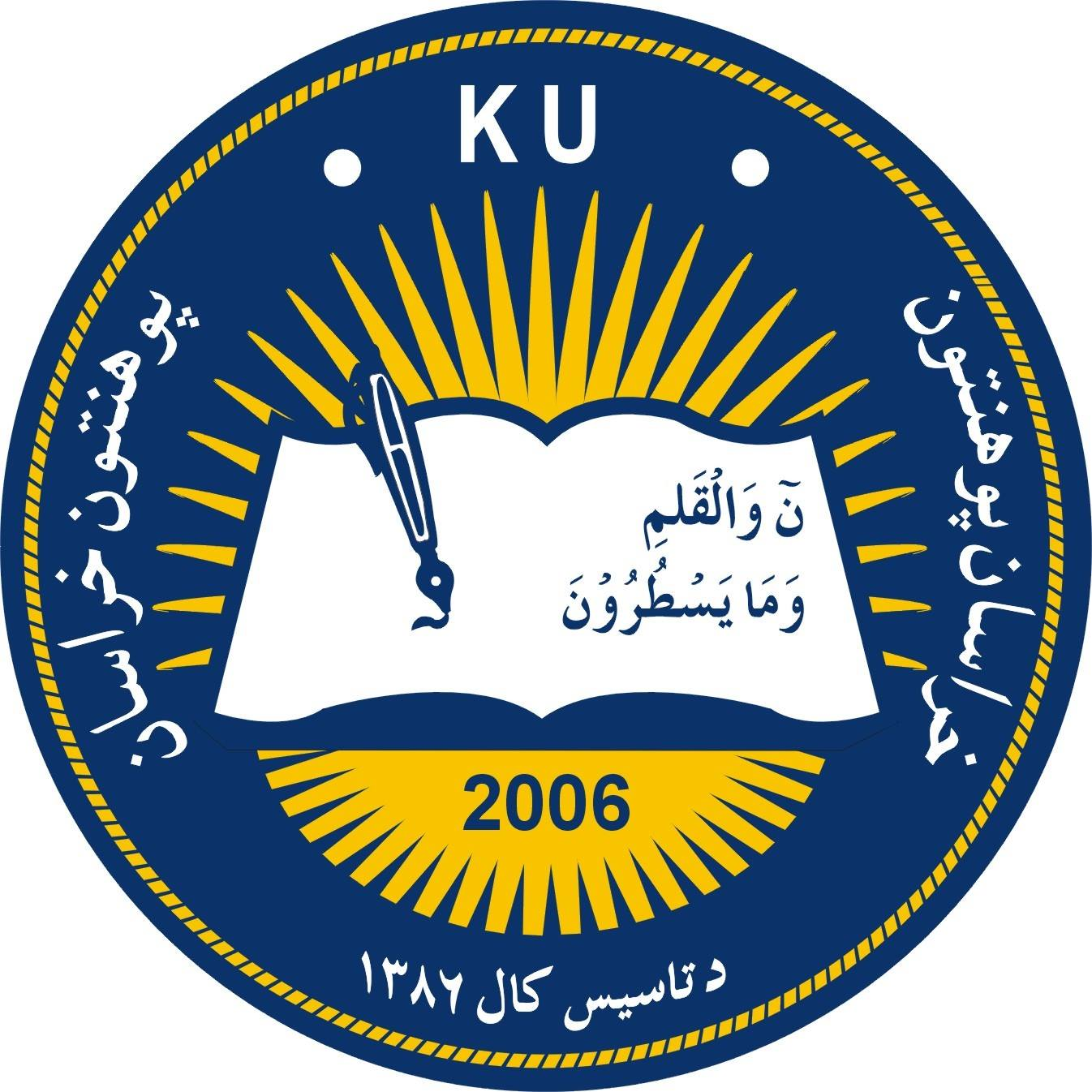
- Khurasan University Emblem
- Type: Private
- Established: 2006
- Affiliations: Ministry of Higher Education Afghanistan
- President: Ahmad Tariq Kamal
- Faculty: Ahmad Tariq, Nijad Ahmad, Nasrullah Kashmir Khan, Ihsanullah Shorish, Engr. Naseer Agha, Engr Hussain, Engr. Qareeb, Khyber Khan
- Location: Jalalabad, Afghanistan
- Colors: Blue
- Nickname: KU

Khurasan University (Pashto: خراسان پوهنتون) is a private university based in Jalalabad, Afghanistan. It was founded in 2006 and registered as a private university in 2007. It offers bachelors and diploma programs in Business Administration, English Language, and Information Technology and graduation degree in five disciplines: Business Administration (Bachelors and Masters), Computer Sciences (Bachelor), Engineering (Bachelor), Journalism and Mass Communication (Bachelor) and English Literature (Bachelor). The name of this university has been derived from the region of Khurasan, a region part of the Greater Iranian culture.

== Academics ==
- Faculty of Management Sciences
- Faculty of Engineering
- Faculty of Computer Sciences
- Faculty of Journalism & Mass Communication

== International partners ==
Khurasan University has joint programs with Atatürk University Turkey, Hatit University of Turkey, the Islamic International University of Pakistan, Delta International University of the United States, the Institute of Management Canada and PUTRA University of Malaysia. KU has membership of the Eurasian Silk Road Universities Consortium (ESRUC) led by Atatürk University Turkey with 49 other universities of the world.

== National partners ==
KU has collaboration programs with Nengrahar University Afghanistan that include orientation programs for teachers and students of Nengrahar University in Economics, joint exchange visits, organizing capacity building workshops and joint training.

== Postgraduate program ==
The Ministry of Higher Education of Afghanistan promoted KU for initiating a post graduation program. Khurasan University was dexterous for initiating a master's degree program. Because of this, it was listed with the few other universities of Afghanistan that award master's degree in the discipline of Business Administration (MBA).

== Student Societies ==
Khurasan University student societies include the following.

=== Literary Society ===
Khurasan University has a literary society composed of students who have closer association with Pashto, Darri and other literatures. The society organizes programs in which students present their poems and other literary work.

=== Tourism Society ===
Khurasan University has a tourism society that makes arrangements for study and tourism tours across the country. Students do study tours to other organizations, places, and sites.

=== Sports Society ===
KU has an active sports society where students participate in sports including volleyball, cricket, football and badminton. KU has separate teams in these sports. KU teams participate in the tournaments on the local as well as national level.

== Students Re-Union Club / KU Alumni Association ==
Hundreds of students have graduated from Khurasan University and now work in national and international organizations. The Students Re-Union Club or KU Alumni Association makes arrangements for the re-unions of those graduates. Students get together occasionally to recall memories of their stay in Khurasan University.

== Khurasan University (KU) Campus Radio ==
Khurasan University (KU) Campus Radio is a webcast. It is the first of its kind in Afghanistan. It was established in 2015 by Department of Journalism & Mass Communication with the aim to train and educate students in the field of broadcast journalism. The radio content is solely produced by students under the direction of department administration.

As of February 2016 students were undertaking 30-minute fortnightly radio magazine programs namely Khurasan University Campus Radio Magazine in which varieties of radio programs are being broadcast. These programs include news reports, feature reports, Health, Education and Sports Roundups. Besides, three special programs—Da Nengarhar Storri (Star of Nengarhar), Adabi Baheer (Literature World) and Da Tareekh Panrra (A Page from History)—are included in the radio magazine program.
