= Spinghar Higher Education Centre =

Coordinates: 34.4328°N 70.4692°E

Spinghar university
- Type: medical, stomatology, medical technology
- Established: May 20, 2009
- Chancellor: Dr Khair Mohammad Momand
- Students: 1429
- Undergraduates: 220
- Location: Jalalabad, Nangarhar, Afghanistan
- Campus: Kabul
- Website: Official website

Spinghar Higher Education Institute (Pashto: سپین غر د لوړو زدکړو موسسه) was registered as a private higher education institute on May 20, 2009, in the city of Jalalabad, Nangarhar province, Afghanistan with the ministry of higher education of Afghanistan. It offers a six-year M.D degree. The last year, i.e. 6, is a pregraduate internship which can be completed in Momand teaching hospital.

The Spinghar University currently holds scientific activities in three faculties (therapeutic medicine, stomatology and medical technology).

Bahauddin Baha, who is a graduate of SIHG, represented Afghanistan in the World Innovation Summit for Education in Doha and later became the first graduate of private medical universities in Afghanistan to get full GMC license. He currently practises in England.

The Spinghar Medical Institute is trying to offer the best available medical facilities to its students in Nangrahar and Kabul, Afghanistan.

Higher education institution Spin Ghar Kabul Branch has 10 professor Dr., 71 master and 50 master bachelors who are contractually and permanently collaborating with the institute.

Spinghar has thousands of students in its branches in curative medicines, Stomatology and medical Technology faculties.

Spinghar University has graduated three batches of medical (male and female) students from the curative medicine faculty.
