= List of steel manufacturers in Afghanistan =

This is a list of steel manufacturers in Afghanistan:

- Afghan Folad Steel Mill in Guzara District of Herat Province
- Balkh Steel factory near Mazar-i-Sharif in Balkh Province
- Kabul Folad Steel Mill in Guzara District of Herat Province
- Kandahar Sheikh Bradran Steel Mills in the Shorandam industrial park, southeast of Kandahar in Kandahar Province
- Khan Steel Mill in the industrial park east of Kabul International Airport in Kabul, Kabul Province
- Maihan Steel Mill in the industrial park east of Kabul International Airport in Kabul, Kabul Province
- Maisam Steel Mill in Puli Charkhi area of Kabul, Kabul Province
- Meli Steel Company in the industrial park east of Kabul International Airport in Kabul, Kabul Province
- Milad Steel Manufacturing Company in Puli Charkhi area of Kabul, Kabul Province
- Milat Steel Mill in Shakardara District, Kabul Province
- Sadat Hofiani Steel Mill Factory in the industrial park east of Kabul International Airport in Kabul, Kabul Province

== See also ==
- List of companies of Afghanistan
