= September 2018 Jalalabad suicide bombing =

Suicide bombing attack

- Part of War in Afghanistan (2001–present)
- Jalalabad (Afghanistan)
- Location: Jalalabad, Nangarhar Province, Islamic Republic of Afghanistan
- Date: 11 September 2018
- Attack type: Suicide bombing
- Deaths: 68
- Injuries: 150
- Perpetrator: ISIL-KP (suspected)

On 11 September 2018, a suicide bomber detonated explosives in a crowd of protesters in the eastern Afghan city of Jalalabad, killing 68 people and injuring over 150 others.

== Perpetrators ==
Nobody immediately claimed responsibility for the bombing, with the Taliban denying any involvement. Government officials suspected ISIL-KP to be involved, due to an increase in activity by the group in the months prior to the bombing.

== Responses ==
The United Nations condemned the attack and expressed their deepest condolences to the victims, urging Afghan officials "to combat by all means, threats to international peace and security caused by terrorist acts".
