= 2019 Jalalabad suicide bombing =

Suicide bombing

- Location of Nangarhar Province in Afghanistan
- Location: Jalalabad, Nangarhar Province, Afghanistan
- Date: 7 October 2019
- Attack type: Suicide bomb
- Deaths: 14+
- Injuries: 37

On 7 October 2019, a suicide bomber detonated an improvised explosive device in a rickshaw in Jalalabad as a minibus carrying Afghan Army recruits passed it. At least fourteen people were killed and 37 others were injured.

== Attack ==
In the early afternoon of 7 October 2019, the explosive-laden rickshaw was driven close to a bus that was transporting dozens of new Afghan Army recruits; traveling to undergo basic military training. The target appeared deliberate, as insurgents frequently targeted recruitment convoys to disrupt military replenishment and erode security force morale. The powerful blast shook nearby homes and shops. News agencies reported that close-range civilians, including a child, were caught in the strike. Witness Rahim Jan described being “knocked to the ground” by the shock and seeing “many dead and wounded people” strewn across the street.

== Aftermath ==
The Nangarhar provincial government strongly condemned the 7 October 2019 Jalalabad suicide attack, a blatant act of terrorism aimed at destabilizing Afghanistan’s fragile security environment.

Although neither IS‑KP nor the Taliban immediately claimed responsibility, analysts and local observers pointed to IS‑KP as likely suspects. This inference is rooted in the groups’ established history of carrying out similar high‑casualty attacks in Nangarhar province, particularly targeting security forces and recruitment convoys. Analysts emphasized that both IS‑KP and the Taliban exhibited capabilities and motives consistent with the attack’s characteristics and timing.
