= Mohammad Gul Khan Momand =

Afghan politician (1885–1964)

- Born: January 17, 1885; Andrabayo, Kabul Province, Emirate of Afghanistan
- Died: August 18, 1964 (aged 79)
- Resting place: Kabul, Afghanistan
- Occupations: Army officer, Minister of television and broadcast, diplomat
- Known for: Military service, Leadership, Pashtunwali

Mohammad Gul Khan Momand (Pashto: محمد ګل خان مومند ;17 January 1885 – 18 August 1964), was military officer and politician in Afghanistan. He served as an Army Officer during Afghanistan's Independence war in 1919. He served in numerous government and leadership positions, including Minister of Interior of Afghanistan.

== Early life and education ==
Wazir Mohammad Gul Khan Momand was born in Andrabayo, Kabul Province to a Mohmand Pashtun family and his forefathers were originally from Nangarhar. His father was Khurshid Khan, while his grandfather was Momen Khan who served in the Afghan Army during the rule of King Abdur Rahman Khan. His great grandfather, Abdul Kareem, also served in the Afghan Army during the reign of King Dost Mohammad Khan. Mohammad Gul Khan attended Habibia High School, and later went on to the Ottoman Empire for higher education. After completing his primary and secondary studies, Mohammad Gul Khan entered the military school in 1909. Apart from Pashto and Dari, Mohammad Gul Khan spoke the Turkish and Russian languages.

== Political and military career ==
Soon after completing the military school, Gul Khan Momand joined the Royal Guards and became a Unit Commander and an instructor for some units. After serving as the principal of the Military School, he later became deputy commander-in-chief and then commander of the Royal Guards.

In 1919 during Afghanistan's struggle for Independence, Mohammad Gul Khan was a member of the delegation, which visited Europe to announce the sovereignty of Afghanistan under King Amanullah Khan. Mohammad Gul Khan was then appointed to serve as diplomat for Afghanistan by King Amanullah Khan. From 1924 to 1928, he also served as governor of Paktia, Nangarhar, Balkh under King Amanullah Khan.

In 1929, the government of King Amanullah Khan fell to the hand of bandits under the leadership of King Habibullah Kalakani known by Pashtuns in Afghanistan or ethnic Afghans as (Persian: بچه سقاب Bacha-i Saqqab; "son of Water Carrier") or old Persian (Persian: بچه سقاو Bacha-i Saqqau). Mohammad Gul Khan joined forces with then General Nadir Khan to restore the official government of Afghanistan. The bandits in Kabul were attacked from three fronts, under the command of Sardar Shah Wali Khan, Shah Mahmud Khan, and Mohammad Gul Khan from Nangarhar. In October 1929, the bandits were completely defeated and the official government of Afghanistan was restored under the King Mohammed Nadir Shah. The family of King Mohammed Nadir Shah had enormous respect for Mohammad Gul Khan and considered him as their sixth brother. From 1930 to 1939, Mohammad Gul Khan was appointed as the Minister of Interior of Afghanistan in the Cabinet of King Mohammed Nadir Shah.

Later in his career, Mohammad Gul Khan served numerous position as Special Envoy throughout Afghanistan. Under his leadership numerous road, bridges, agricultural, schools, and other infrastructure projects were successfully completed. The stories of Mohammad Gul Khan's service to Afghanistan is common talking points in Afghan households.

== Pashtun/Afghan Nationalism ==
Mohammad Gul Khan's literary work mainly deals with Pashto language. He wrote several books and compiled a Pashto dictionary called "De Pakhtu Sind". His other work include "De Pukhtu De Zabe Lyara" (on Pashto grammar) and another book entitled "De Pashto Landakai". His letter to Abdul Rauf Benawa regarding the importance of language for the nation and the responsibilities of writers and leaders towards their language was published in a fifty-three page essay by Pashto Tolana (Pashto Gathering), in Kabul. "This essay counts all the virtues of human life in relation to Pashto and Pashtunwali." (Hamish Khalil, 1995). Mohammad Gul Khan supported a powerful and unified Afghan National Army.

According to his defenders, Mohammad Gul Khan was fair and just with other ethnic minorities in Afghanistan. Author Nancy Tapper in her book "Bartered Brides" describes Mohammad Gul Khan as, "Despite fiercely pro-Pashtun sentiments, Muhammad Gul Khan refused to countenance the oppression perpetuated by the Khans. He balanced the domination of Durrani from Kandahar by introducing many more eastern Pashtuns to the area (especially as landowners between Aqcha and Balkh), and he appears to have dealt fairly with petitions against the Nazarzai brought by Uzbeks and Aymaks from throughout the Saripul region and its hinterland." p. 34.

According to his detractors, Mohmand enforced a central government policy of political and cultural discrimination against non-Pashtuns. He was assigned as a "special envoy to northern Afghanistan" where he pushed for its Pashtunization (i.e. settling Pashtuns, often by force, in the north). His Pashtunization projects also included changing the lingua franca of the region from Persian to Pashto. He is associated with oppression and disenfranchisement among the non-Pashtuns of northern Afghanistan.

== Death ==
Gul Khan Momand died on August 18, 1964, at the age of 79. His funeral was attended by the then prime minister of Afghanistan, Sardar Mohammad Daoud Khan, and King Zahir Shah. He is survived by his only daughter who was married to one Sher Ahmad Khan of Lalpura District, Nangarhar.

He was buried at Shuhada-e-Saliheen Cemetery in Kabul, Afghanistan.
