= Momand Dara District =

District of Nangarhar, Afghanistan

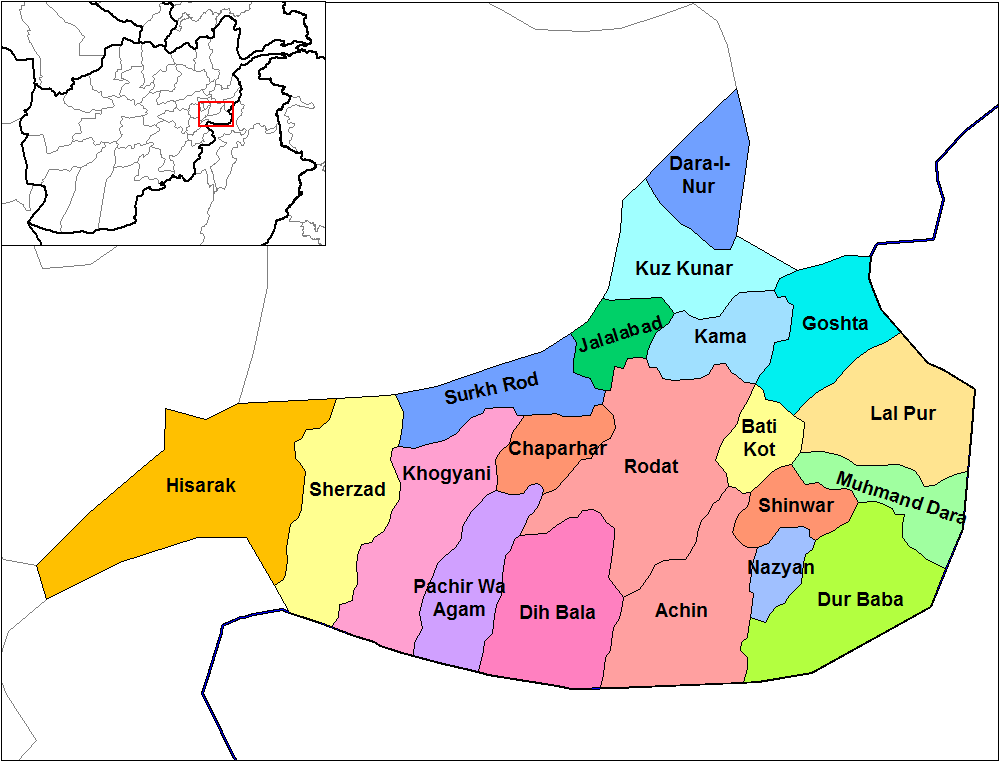
Nangarhar districts.

Momand Dara (Pashto: مومند دره) is a district in the east of Nangarhar Province, Afghanistan, bordering Pakistan. Its population, which is 100% Pashtun, was estimated at 33,966 in 2002, of whom 14,800 were children under the age of 12. The district is within the heartland of the Mohmand tribe of Pashtuns. The district centre is the village of Momand Dara. Torkham, which is in the south of the district, is one of the main border crossing points into Pakistan.

On March 4, 2007, it was the site of an incident in which a number of civilians were killed.
