= Afghanistan Institute of Higher Education =

Higher education in Kabul, Afghanistan

Coordinates: 34°33′51.88″N 69°9′7.64″E

Afghanistan Institute Of Higher Education
- "مؤسسه تحصیلات عالی افغانستان"
- Type: Private Institution
- Established: March 1, 2012
- Chancellor: Faramarz Tamanna
- Location: Kabul, Afghanistan
- Colors: Blue & Green
- Website: https://web.archive.org/web/20140517080005/http://dis.af/

The Afghanistan Institute of Higher Education (Dari: مؤسسه تحصیلات عالی افغانستان) is a higher education institute in Kabul, Afghanistan.

== Advocacy ==
Lobbying and support for the services being provided to ANSF and the families of ANSF who lost their loved ones in serving the country. H4AH has invested a lot of time and effort for providing advocacy to the target groups in giving them their basic and legal rights such as education, pension, and physiological support.

== Health ==
H4AH provides basic medical support for ANSF disabled and fallen heroes families and who are critically injured and could be recovered from disability,

H4AH is also helping the disabled heroes by providing the physical rehabilitation of body parts in addition H4AH in addition by providing small gift packs on special occasions to the target groups which provide.

=== Psychology Counselling ===
- One of the key initiatives of H4AH in medical support is peer counseling for ANSF who has recently lost their body parts which get motivated and feel hopeful and give them feeling of belo ngings and sympathy.

== The Fundraising Strategy ==
To operate effectively, the organization's independence is critical and H4AH works throughout the year to raise funds for its projects.

Expenditure, in accordance with budget authorizations, shall be financed by contributions from donors: States, supranational organizations and public and private sources. The Annual Appeal (AA) is the program cycle that helps to achieve this and allows the organization to call for funds in order that people in need can be supported in a timely and accountable way.

== Regional Offices ==
Being a newly established charity organization, Help for Afghan Heroes (H4AH) has started its operation from Kabul Province with holding its Headquarter in Shar-e-Naw Kabul, while our long-term strategy is to set-up (number of regional offices) in (number of provinces or zones) of Afghanistan to provide a sustainable and reliable services to Afghan National Security Forces (ANSF) brave man and woman and their families.

== See also ==
- Afghan University
