= Afghan University =

Coordinates: 34.53386°N 69.10199°E

Afghan University is located in Kabul, Afghanistan, and was officially established in 2012. It is a private university.
