= Charahi Qambar =

Refugee camp in Kabul, Afghanistan

Charahi Qambar is the name of one of the refugee camps in western Kabul. It is a collection of mud-walled dwellings next to at least one multi-storied cement building. Children died of the cold during the winter of 2012.
