= Afghanistan =

Country in Central and South Asia

Islamic Emirate of Afghanistan: د افغانستان اسلامي امارت (Pashto) Də Afğānistān Islāmi Imārat; امارت اسلامی افغانستان (Dari) Imārat-i Islāmī-yi Afğānistān
- Flag Emblem
- Motto: لَا إِلهَ إِلَّا اللَّهُ، مُحَمَّدٌ رَسُولُ اللَّهِ Lā ʾilāha ʾillā llāh, Muhammadun rasūlu llāh "There is no god but God; Muhammad is the messenger of God." (Shahada)
- Anthem: دا د باتورانو کور (Pashto); Dā Də Bātorāno Kor "This is the Home of the Brave" (de facto)
- Capital and largest city: Kabul; 34°31′N 69°11′E
- Official languages: Pashto; Dari
- Ethnic groups: See Ethnicity in Afghanistan
- Religion (2020): 99.9% Islam; 89.1% Sunni (official); 10.8% Shia; 0.1% other
- Demonym: Afghan (Note: Other demonyms that have been used are Afghani, Afghanese and Afghanistani (see Afghans for further details))
- Government: Unitary totalitarian theocratic Islamic emirate
  - Supreme Leader: Hibatullah Akhundzada
  - Prime Minister: Hasan Akhund
  - Chief Justice: Abdul Hakim Haqqani
- Legislature: None (Note: Afghanistan is a pure autocracy, with all law ultimately originating from the supreme leader. There is an advisory Leadership Council, which is not a legislature as it has no power to pass laws.)

Formation
  - Hotak Empire: 21 April 1709
  - Durrani Empire: June 1747
  - Barakzai Emirate: 1823
  - Unification: 27 May 1863
  - Independence: 19 August 1919
  - Kingdom: 9 June 1926
  - Republic: 17 July 1973
  - Democratic Republic: 30 April 1978
  - Islamic State: 28 April 1992
  - Islamic Emirate: 27 September 1996
  - Islamic Republic: 26 January 2004
  - Restoration of Islamic Emirate: 15 August 2021

Area
  - Total: 652,864 km^{2} (252,072 sq mi) (40th)
  - Water (%): negligible

Population
  - mid-2024/2025 estimate: ▲35–50 million (Note: The last census was conducted in 1979. Sources disagree about the current population: The Afghani National Statistics and Information Authority gives an estimate of 35,695,527 for 2024.; The Encyclopædia Britannica gives an estimate of 36,432,000 for 2025.; The BBC gives a figure of 38.3 million for 2023.; The CIA gives an estimate of 40,121,552 for 2024.; The UN gives an estimate of 42,045,000 for 2024.; The U.S. Census Bureau provides an estimate of 49,552,566 for 2025.; All figures are mid-year.) (36th)
  - Density: 64/km^{2} (165.8/sq mi)
- GDP (PPP): 2023 estimate
  - Total: ▲$91.668 billion
  - Per capita: ▲$2,174 (179th)
- GDP (nominal): 2023 estimate
  - Total: ▲$17.329 billion
  - Per capita: ▲$411 (190th)
- HDI (2023): ▲0.496 low (181st)
- Currency: Afghani (افغانى) (AFN)
- Time zone: UTC+4:30 (Afghanistan Time)
- ISO 3166 code: AF
- Internet TLD: .af

Afghanistan, (Note: /æfˈɡænɪstæn, æfˈɡɑːnɪstɑːn/: Pashto: افغانستان, romanized: Afğānistān [ʔaʊ.ɣɑ.nis.tɑn/ʔap.ɣɑ.nis.tɑn]; Dari: افغانستان, romanized: Afğānistān [ʔäv.ɣɑː.nɪs.t̪ʰɑ́ːn/ʔäf.ɣɑː.nɪs.t̪ʰɑ́ːn]) officially the Islamic Emirate of Afghanistan, (Note: Pashto: د افغانستان اسلامي امارت [d̪ə ʔaʊ.ɣɑ.nis.tɑn/ʔap.ɣɑ.nis.tɑn ʔis.lɑ.mi ʔi.mɑ.ɾat̪]; Dari: امارت اسلامی افغانستان [ʔɪ.mɑː.ɾä.t̪ʰɪ ʔɪs.lɑː.mi.jɪ ʔäf.ɣɑː.nɪs.t̪ʰɑ́ːn/ʔäv.ɣɑː.nɪs.t̪ʰɑ́ːn]) is a landlocked country located at the crossroads of Central and South Asia. It is bordered by Pakistan to the east and south, (Note: The Government of India regards Afghanistan as a bordering country, as it considers all of Kashmir to be part of India. However, this is disputed, and the region bordering Afghanistan is administered by Pakistan as Gilgit-Baltistan.) Iran to the west, Turkmenistan to the northwest, Uzbekistan to the north, Tajikistan to the northeast, and China to the northeast and east. Occupying 652,864 square kilometers (252,072 sq mi) of land, the country is predominantly mountainous with plains in the north and the southwest, which are separated by the Hindu Kush mountain range. Kabul is the country's capital and largest city. Afghanistan's population is estimated to be between 35 and 50 million.

Human habitation in Afghanistan dates to the Middle Paleolithic era. The country's land has witnessed numerous military campaigns, including those by the Achaemenids, Alexander the Great, the Maurya Empire, Arab Muslims, the Mongols, the British, the Soviet Union, and a United States-led coalition. Afghanistan also served as the source from which the Greco-Bactrians and the Mughals, among others, rose to form major empires. Because of the various conquests and periods in both the Iranian and Indian cultural spheres, the area was a center for Zoroastrianism, Buddhism, Hinduism, and later Islam.

The modern state of Afghanistan began with the Durrani Empire in the 18th century under Ahmad Shah Durrani, although Dost Mohammad Khan is sometimes considered to be the founder of the first modern Afghan state. Afghanistan became a buffer state in the Great Game between the British Empire and the Russian Empire. From India, the British attempted to subjugate Afghanistan but were repelled in the First Anglo-Afghan War; the Second Anglo-Afghan War saw a British victory. Following the Third Anglo-Afghan War in 1919, Afghanistan became free of foreign political hegemony, and emerged as the independent Kingdom of Afghanistan in 1926; this monarchy lasted almost half a century.

Since the late 1970s, Afghanistan's history has been defined by extensive warfare, including coups, invasions, insurgencies, and civil wars. This period of instability began in 1973 when King Zahir Shah was overthrown by his cousin Mohammad Daoud Khan, ending the monarchy and resulting in the establishment of the Republic of Afghanistan. Daoud Khan became the President of Afghanistan, ruling as an autocrat. In 1978 the conflict became a violent one when a communist revolution overthrew and assassinated Daoud Khan, establishing the socialist Democratic Republic of Afghanistan. Subsequent infighting prompted the Soviet Union to invade Afghanistan in 1979.

The mujahideen won against the Soviets in the Soviet–Afghan War, leading to the Soviets' withdrawal in 1989. The ensuing civil war overthrew the socialist republic and established the Islamic State of Afghanistan through the Peshawar Accord, which could not remain in force and resulted in a second civil war between mujahideen factions in 1992. The Taliban controlled most of the country by 1996, but their Islamic Emirate of Afghanistan received little international recognition before its overthrow in the 2001 United States invasion of Afghanistan. The Taliban returned to power in 2021 after capturing Kabul, ending the 2001–2021 war. The Taliban government is widely unrecognized (Note: As of July 2025, Russia remains the only UN member state to have extended diplomatic recognition to the Taliban government.) by the international community due to reported violations of human rights in Afghanistan, particularly regarding the treatment of women by the Taliban.

Afghanistan is rich in natural resources, including lithium, iron, zinc, and copper. It is the world's third largest producer of both saffron and cashmere. The country is a member of the South Asian Association for Regional Cooperation and a founding member of the Organization of Islamic Cooperation. Due to the effects of war in recent decades, the country has dealt with high levels of terrorism, poverty, and child malnutrition. Afghanistan remains among the world's least developed countries with its economic output per capita among the lowest of any country.

== Etymology ==
The precise origin of the name is uncertain and debated. Some scholars suggest that the root name Afghān is derived from the Sanskrit word Aśvakan, which was the name used for ancient inhabitants of the Hindu Kush. Aśvakan literally means "horsemen", "horse breeders", or "cavalrymen" (from aśva, the Sanskrit and Avestan words for "horse").

Historically, the ethnonym Afghān was used to refer to ethnic Pashtuns. The Arabic and Persian form of the name, Afġān, was first attested in the 10th-century geography book Hudud al-'Alam. The last part of the name, "-stan", is a Persian suffix meaning "place of". Therefore, "Afghanistan" translates to "land of the Afghans", or "land of the Pashtuns" in a historical sense. According to the third edition of the Encyclopaedia of Islam:

The name Afghanistan (Afghānistān, land of the Afghans / Pashtuns, afāghina, sing. afghān) can be traced to the early eighth/fourteenth century, when it designated the easternmost part of the Kartid realm. This name was later used for certain regions in the Ṣafavid and Mughal empires that were inhabited by Afghans. While based on a state-supporting elite of Abdālī / Durrānī Afghans, the Sadūzāʾī Durrānī polity that came into being in 1747 (1160 in the Islamic calendar) was not called Afghanistan in its own day. The name became a state designation only during the colonial interventions of the 19th century.

The term "Afghanistan" was officially used in 1855, when the British recognized Dost Mohammad Khan as King of Afghanistan.

== History ==
=== Prehistory and antiquity ===
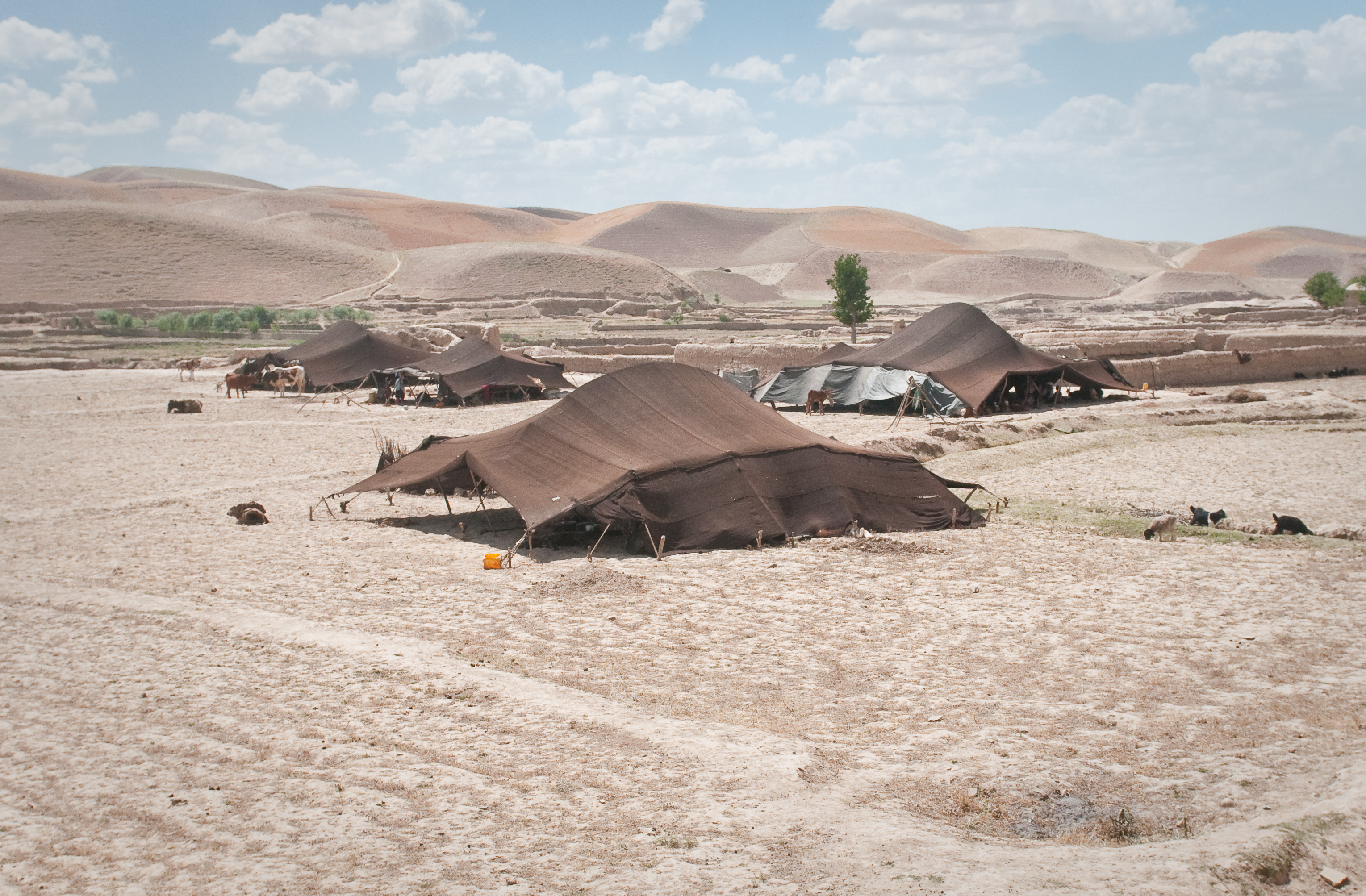
Tents of Afghan nomads in the northern Badghis Province. Early peasant farming villages came into existence about 7,000 years ago.

Excavations of prehistoric sites suggest that humans were living in what is now Afghanistan at least 50,000 years ago, and that farming communities in the area were among the earliest in the world. An important site of early historical activities, many believe that Afghanistan compares to Egypt in the historical value of its archaeological sites. Artifacts typical of the Paleolithic, Mesolithic, Neolithic, Bronze, and Iron ages have been found in Afghanistan. Urban civilization is believed to have begun as early as 3000 BCE, and the early city of Mundigak (near Kandahar in the south of the country) was a center of the Helmand culture. More recent findings established that the Indus Valley Civilisation stretched up towards modern-day Afghanistan. An Indus Valley site has been found on the Oxus River at Shortugai in northern Afghanistan.

After 2000 BCE successive waves of semi-nomadic people from Central Asia began moving south into Afghanistan; among them were many Indo-European-speaking Indo-Iranians. These tribes later migrated further into South Asia, Western Asia, and toward Europe via the area north of the Caspian Sea. The region at the time was referred to as Ariana. By the middle of the 6th century BCE, the Achaemenids overthrew the Medes and incorporated Arachosia, Aria, and Bactria within its eastern boundaries. An inscription on the tombstone of Darius the Great mentions the Kabul Valley in a list of the 29 countries that he had conquered. The region of Arachosia, around Kandahar in modern-day southern Afghanistan, used to be primarily Zoroastrian and played a key role in the transfer of the Avesta to Persia, and is thus considered by some to be the "second homeland of Zoroastrianism".

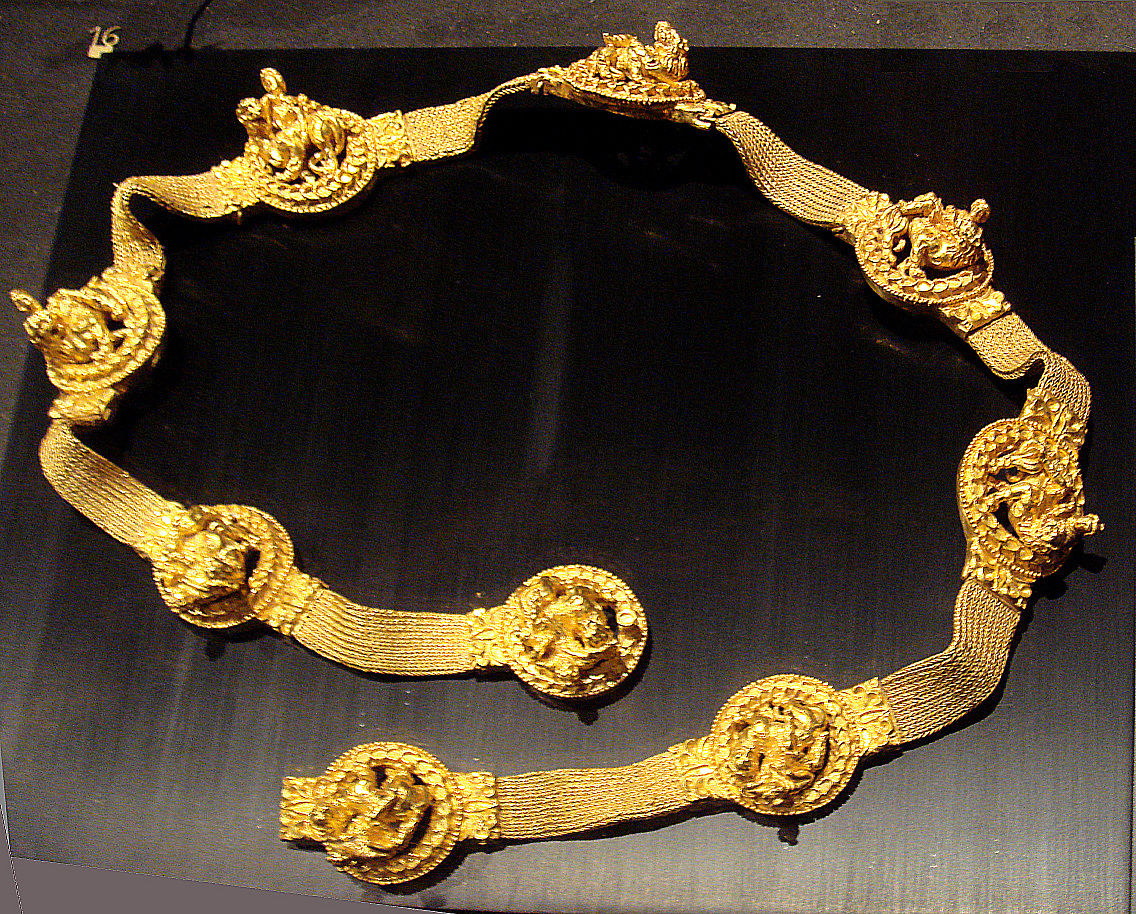
A "Bactrian gold" Scythian belt depicting Dionysus, from Tillya Tepe in the ancient region of Bactria

Alexander the Great and his Macedonian forces arrived in Afghanistan in 330 BCE after defeating Darius III of Persia a year earlier in the Battle of Gaugamela. Following Alexander's brief occupation, the successor state of the Seleucid Empire controlled the region until 305 BCE, when Seleucids ceded much of it to the Maurya Empire as part of an alliance treaty. The Mauryans controlled the area south of the Hindu Kush until they were overthrown in about 185 BCE. Their decline began 60 years after Ashoka's rule ended, leading to the Hellenistic reconquest by the Greco-Bactrians. Much of it soon broke away and became part of the Indo-Greek Kingdom. They were defeated and expelled by the Indo-Scythians in the late 2nd century BCE. The Silk Road appeared during the first century BCE, and Afghanistan flourished with trade, with routes to China, India, Persia, and north to the cities of Bukhara, Samarkand, and Khiva in present-day Uzbekistan. Goods and ideas were exchanged at this center point, such as Chinese silk, Persian silver and Roman gold, while the region of present Afghanistan was mining and trading lapis lazuli stones mainly from the Badakhshan region.

During the first century BCE, the Parthian Empire subjugated the region but lost it to their Indo-Parthian vassals. In the mid-to-late first century CE the vast Kushan Empire, centered in Afghanistan, became great patrons of Buddhist culture, making Buddhism flourish throughout the region. The Kushans were overthrown by the Sassanids in the 3rd century CE, though the Indo-Sassanids continued to rule at least parts of the region. They were followed by the Kidarites who, in turn, was replaced by the Hephthalites. They were replaced by the Turk Shahi in the 7th century. The Buddhist Turk Shahi of Kabul was replaced by a Hindu dynasty before the Saffarids conquered the area in 870; this Hindu dynasty was called Hindu Shahi. Much of the northeastern and southern areas of the country remained dominated by Buddhist culture.

=== Medieval period ===
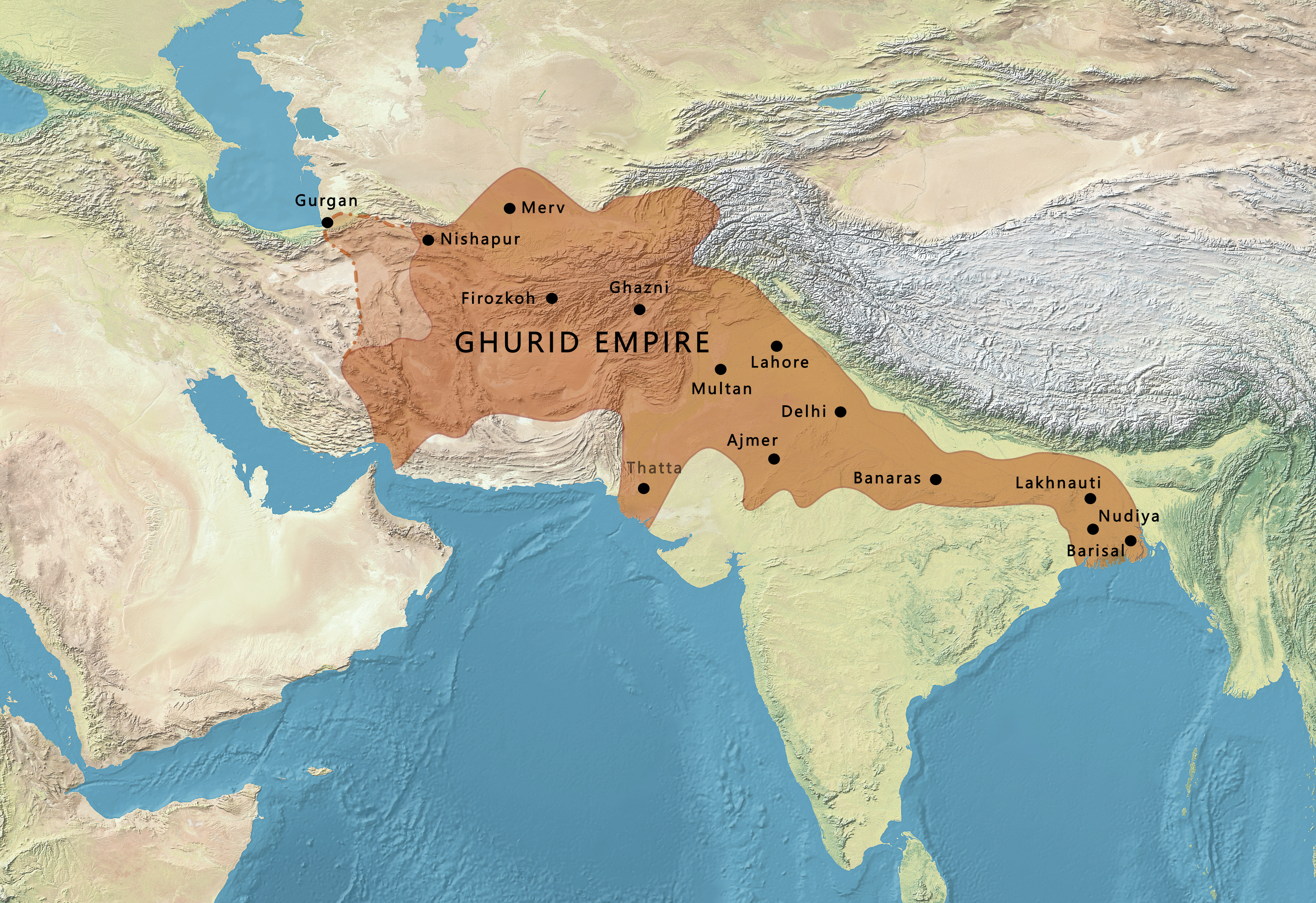
The Ghurids originated from Ghor Province in central Afghanistan.

Arab Muslims brought Islam to Herat and Zaranj in 642 CE as the caliphate spread eastwards; some of the native inhabitants they encountered accepted it while others revolted. Before the arrival of Islam, the region used to be home to various beliefs and cults, often resulting in Syncretism between the dominant religions such as Zoroastrianism, Buddhism or Greco-Buddhism, Ancient Iranian religions, Hinduism, Christianity, and Judaism. An exemplification of the syncretism in the region would be that people were followers of Buddhism but still worshipped local Iranian gods such as Ahura Mazda, Lady Nana, Anahita or Mihr (Mithra) and portrayed Greek gods as protectors of Buddha. The Zunbils and Kabul Shahi were first conquered in 870 CE by the Saffarid Muslims of Zaranj. Later, the Samanids extended their Islamic influence south of the Hindu Kush. The Turkic mamluk Ghaznavids rose to power in the 10th century.

By the 11th century, Mahmud of Ghazni had defeated the remaining Hindu rulers and effectively Islamized the wider region, with the exception of Kafiristan. Mahmud made Ghazni into an important city and patronized intellectuals such as the historian al-Biruni and the poet Ferdowsi. The Ghaznavid dynasty was overthrown by the Tajik Ghurids in 1186, whose architectural achievements included the remote Minaret of Jam. The Ghurids controlled Afghanistan for less than a century before being conquered by the Khwarazmian dynasty, another dynasty of Turkic mamluk origin, in 1215.

Mongol invasions and conquests

In 1219 CE, Genghis Khan and his Mongol army overran the region. His troops reportedly annihilated the Khwarazmian cities of Herat and Balkh as well as Bamyan. The destruction caused by the Mongols forced many locals to return to an agrarian rural society. Mongol rule continued with the Ilkhanate in the northwest while the Khalji dynasty administered the Afghan tribal areas south of the Hindu Kush until the invasion of Timur (also known as Tamerlane), a Turco-Mongol warrior who established the Timurid Empire in 1370. Under the rule of Shah Rukh, the city of Herat served as the focal point of the Timurid Renaissance, whose glory matched Florence of the Italian Renaissance as the center of a cultural rebirth.

In the early 16th century Babur, a Timurid prince from Ferghana, captured Kabul from the Arghun dynasty. Babur would go on to conquer the Afghan Lodi dynasty, who had ruled the Delhi Sultanate, in the First Battle of Panipat. Between the 16th and 18th century, the territory was divided among the Uzbek Khanate of Bukhara, Iranian Safavids, and Indian Mughals. During the medieval period, the northwestern area of Afghanistan was referred to by the regional name Khorasan, which was commonly used up to the 19th century among natives to describe their country.

=== Hotak dynasty ===
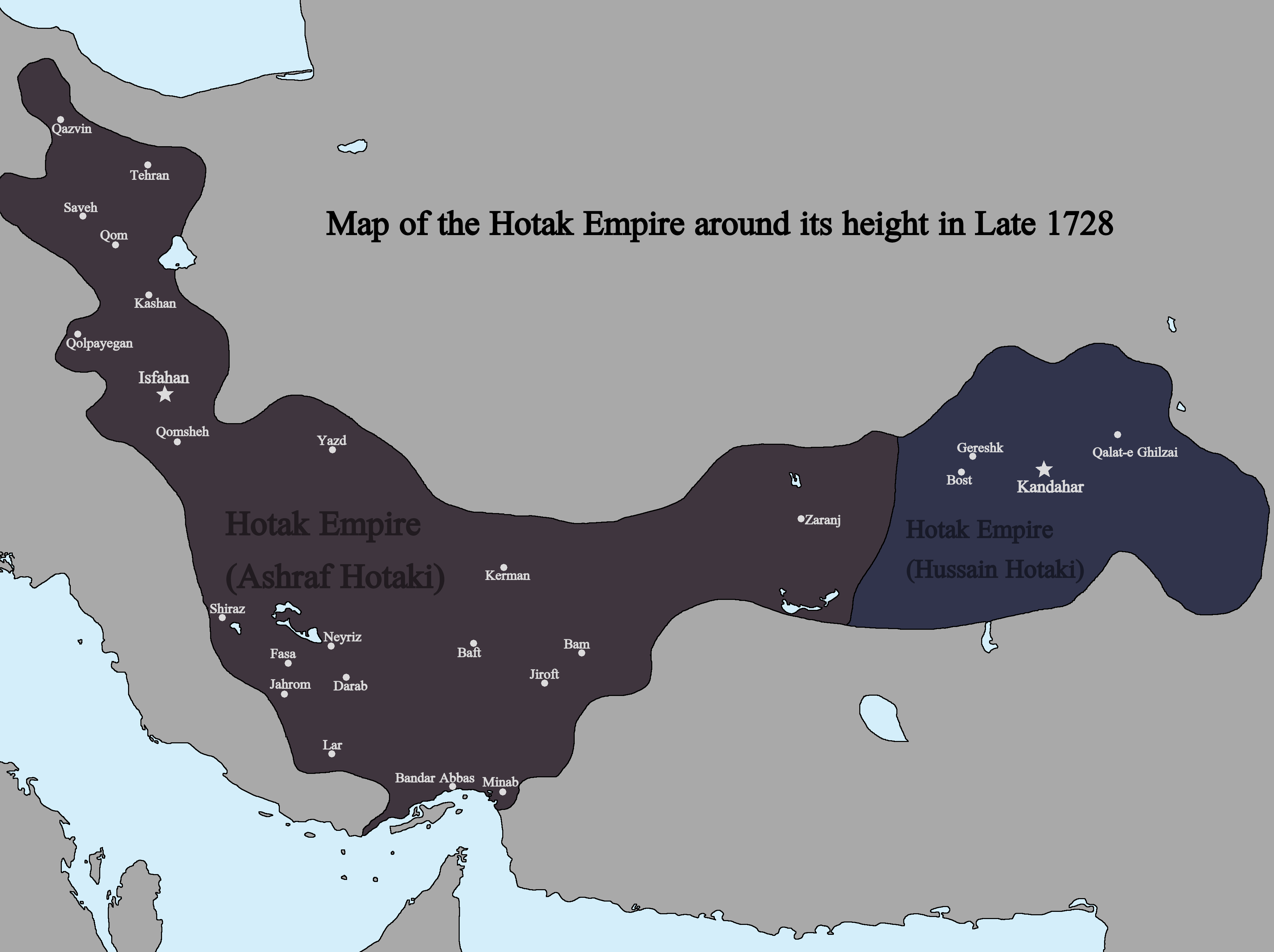
Map of the Hotak dynasty at its height in 1728, divided between Hussain Hotak (centered in Kandahar) and Ashraf Hotak (centered in Isfahan)

In 1709, Mirwais Hotak, a local Ghilzai tribal leader, successfully rebelled against the Safavids. He defeated George XI (Gurgin Khan), the Georgian governor of Kandahar under the Safavids, and established his own kingdom. Mirwais died in 1715, and was succeeded by his brother Abdul Aziz, who was soon killed by Mirwais's son Mahmud for possibly planning to sign a peace with the Safavids. Mahmud led the Afghan army in 1722 to the Persian capital of Isfahan, and captured the city after the Battle of Gulnabad and proclaimed himself King of Persia. The Afghan dynasty was ousted from Persia by Nader Shah after the 1729 Battle of Damghan.

In 1738, Nader Shah and his forces captured Kandahar in the siege of Kandahar, the last Hotak stronghold, from Shah Hussain Hotak. Soon after, the Persian and Afghan forces invaded India, Nader Shah had plundered Delhi, alongside his 16-year-old commander, Ahmad Shah Durrani who had assisted him on these campaigns. Nader Shah was assassinated in 1747.

=== Durrani Empire ===
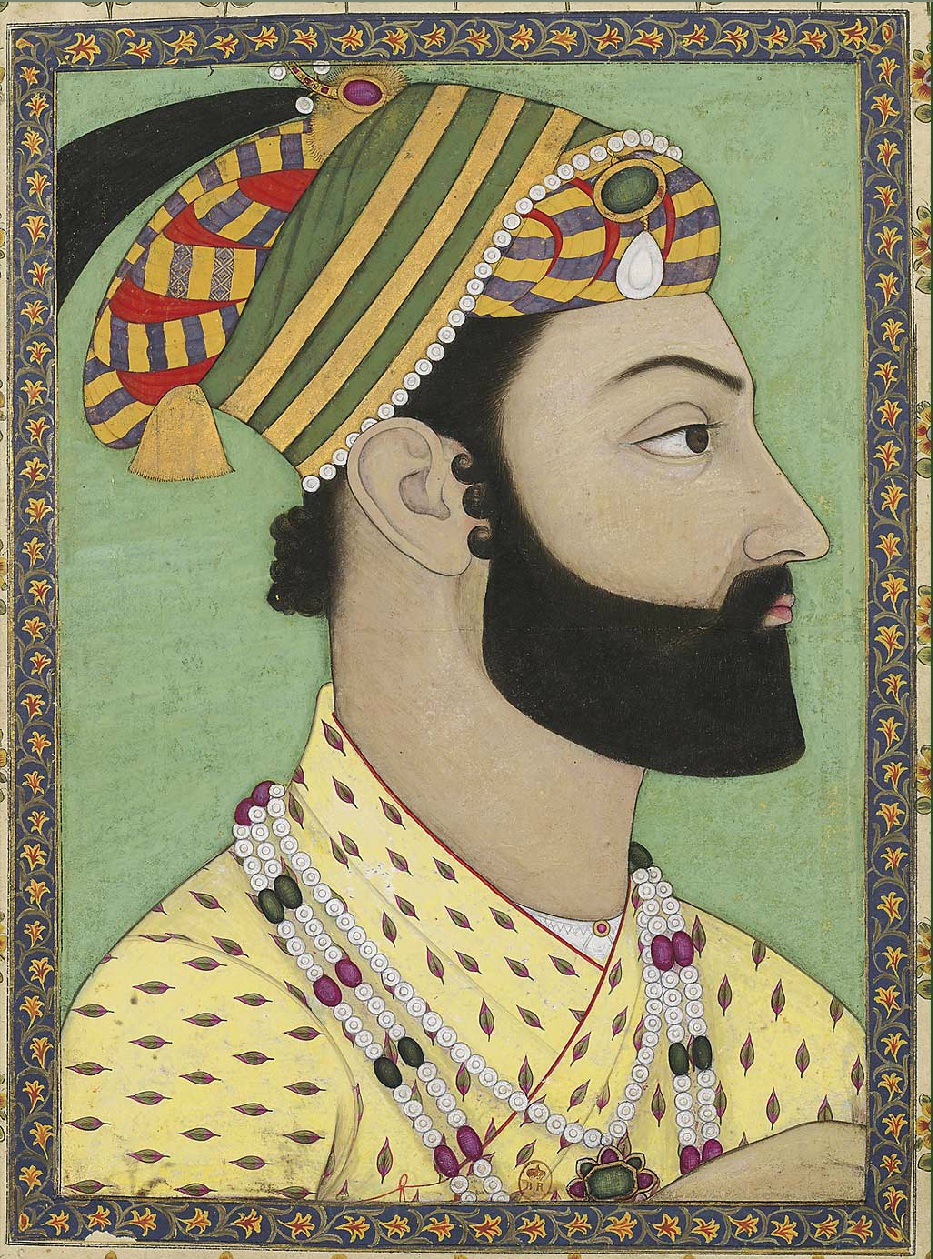
Portrait of Ahmad Shah Durrani, c. 1757

Ahmad Shah Durrani formally established the Durrani Empire in 1748; it is considered foundational polity of modern Afghanistan. He launched two campaigns into Khorasan, 1750–1751 and 1754–1755, and by the time of his death, his empire encompassed large parts in west and south Asia. However, the Durrani state had begun crumbling even during his lifetime, and by the early 19th century, it was under threat from the Qajar Iran in the west and the Sikh Empire in the east.

=== Barakzai dynasty and British wars ===
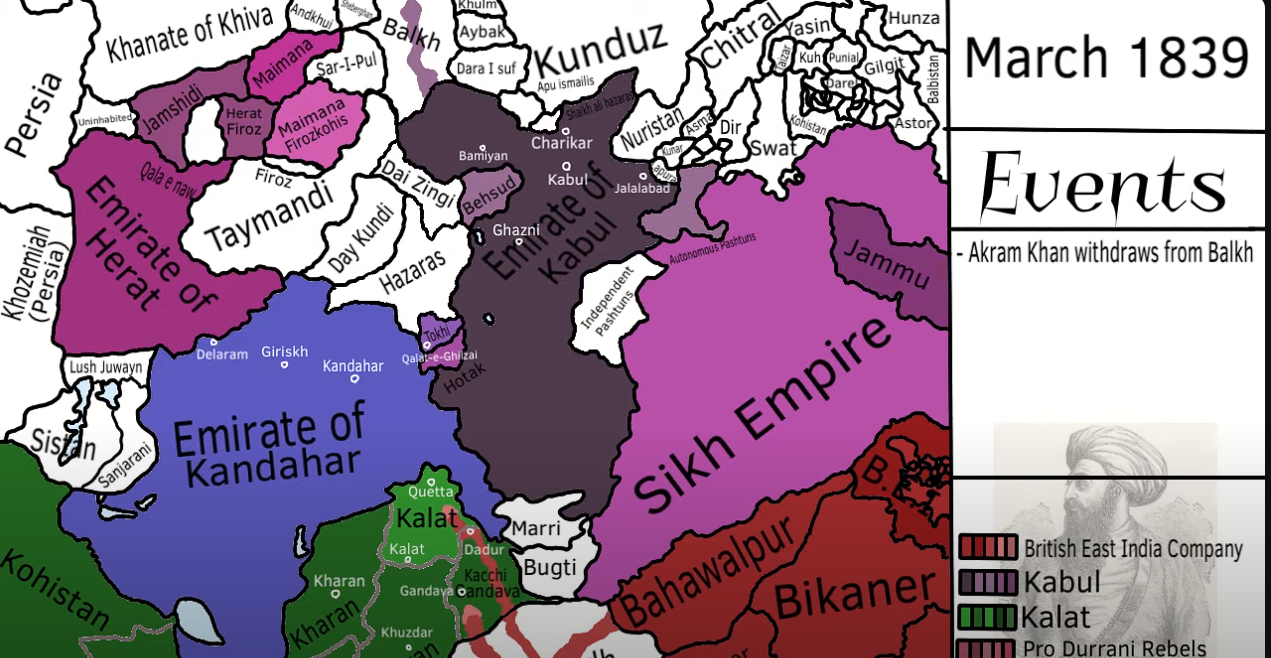
Map of Emirate of Afghanistan and surrounding nations in 1839, during the First Anglo-Afghan War. Dost Mohammad Khan ruled the Emirate of Kabul; the Emirate of Kandahar and the Emirate of Herat were situated to the south and west.

Fateh Khan, leader of the Barakzai tribe, installed many of his brothers in positions of power throughout the empire. Fateh Khan was brutally murdered in 1818 by Mahmud Shah Durrani. As a result, the brothers of Fateh Khan and the Barakzai tribe rebelled, and a civil war brewed. During this turbulent period, Afghanistan fractured into many states, including the Pashtun-ruled emirates of Kabul, Kandahar, and Herat; Uzbek-ruled khanates of Kunduz and Maimana, and numerous other warring polities. To the north Emirate of Badakhshan also became independent. The most prominent state was the Emirate of Kabul, ruled by Dost Mohammad Khan.

In 1837, Wazir Akbar Khan and the Afghan army failed to capture the Jamrud Fort from the Sikh Empire, but killed Sikh commander Hari Singh Nalwa, thus ending the Afghan–Sikh wars. Dost Muhammad Khan slowly consolidated his power following the British retreat in the First Anglo-Afghan War in 1842; he successively captured Balkh (1850) and Kandahar (1856), and after Iranian departure from Herat under Treaty of Paris in 1857, he conquered Herat as well in 1863. He is sometimes viewed as founder of modern Afghanistan.

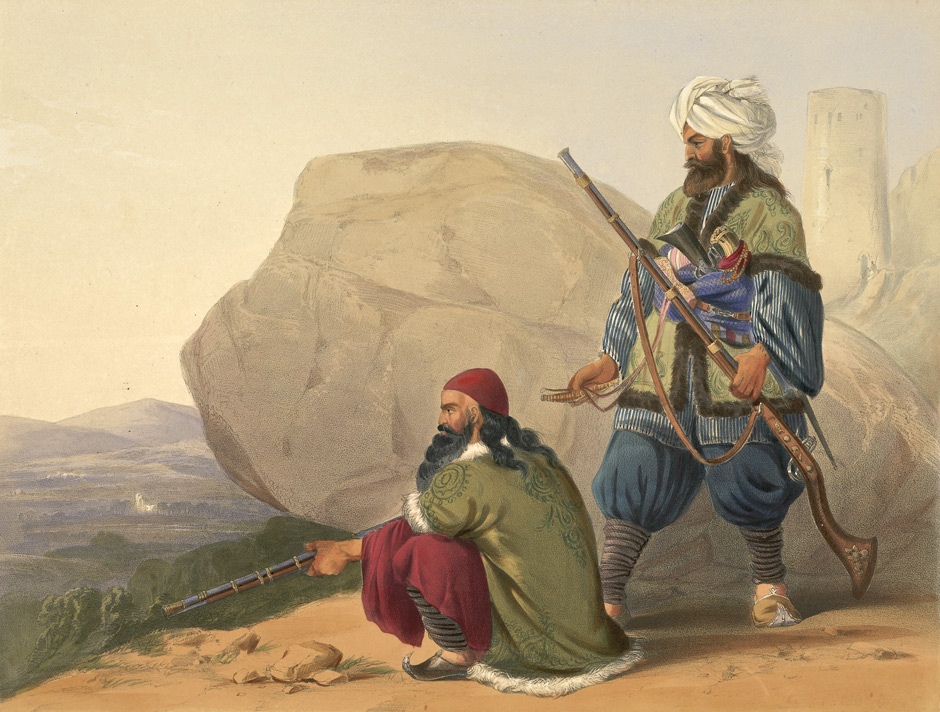
Afghan tribesmen in 1841, painted by British officer James Rattray

Following the Second Anglo-Afghan War, Abdur Rahman Khan became emir with British backing in 1880. In 1893, Abdur Rahman formally signed and finalised the Afghan border with British India, after which the ethnic Pashtun and Baloch territories were divided by the Durand Line, which forms the modern-day border between Afghanistan and Pakistan. Hazara dominated Hazaristan and non-Muslim Kafiristan remained politically independent. Hazaristan was conquered in 1888–1893 after three rebellions, with Kafiristan being annexed by Afghans in 1895–1896; the events saw widespread atrocities and forced religious conversion. Abdur Rahman Khan was known as the "Iron Amir" for features of his rule and his ruthless methods against tribes. He died in 1901, succeeded by his son, Habibullah Khan.

How can a small power like Afghanistan, which is like a goat between these lions [Britain and Russia] or a grain of wheat between two strong millstones of the grinding mill, stand in the midway of the stones without being ground to dust?

— Abdur Rahman Khan, the "Iron Amir", in 1900

During the First World War, when Afghanistan was neutral, Habibullah Khan was met by officials of the Central Powers in the Niedermayer–Hentig Expedition. They called on Afghanistan to declare full independence from the United Kingdom, join them and attack British India, as part of the Hindu–German Conspiracy. The effort to bring Afghanistan into the Central Powers failed, but it sparked discontent among the population about maintaining neutrality with the British. Habibullah was assassinated in February 1919, and Amanullah Khan eventually assumed power. A staunch supporter of the 1915–1916 expeditions, Amanullah Khan invaded British India, beginning the Third Anglo-Afghan War, and entering British India via the Khyber Pass.

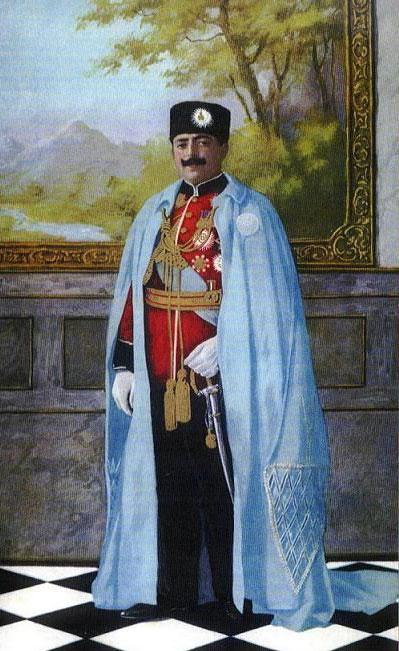
Amanullah Khan proclaimed himself King of Afghanistan in June 1926.

Following the end of the Third Anglo-Afghan War and the signing of the Treaty of Rawalpindi on 19 August 1919, Emir Amanullah Khan declared the Emirate of Afghanistan a sovereign and fully independent state. He moved to end his country's traditional isolation by establishing diplomatic relations with the international community, particularly with the Soviet Union and the Weimar Republic. He proclaimed himself King of Afghanistan on 9 June 1926, forming the Kingdom of Afghanistan. He introduced several reforms intended to modernize his nation. A key force behind these reforms was Mahmud Tarzi, an ardent supporter of the education of women. He fought for Article 68 of Afghanistan's 1923 constitution, which implemented compulsory elementary education. Slavery was abolished in 1923. King Amanullah's wife, Queen Soraya, was an important figure during this period in the fight for women's education and against their oppression.

Some of the reforms, such as the abolition of the traditional burqa for women and the opening of co-educational schools, alienated many tribal and religious leaders, leading to the Afghan Civil War (1928–1929). King Amanullah abdicated in January 1929, and soon after Kabul fell to Saqqawist forces led by Habibullah Kalakani. Mohammad Nadir Shah, Amanullah's cousin, defeated and killed Kalakani in October 1929, and was declared King Nadir Shah. He abandoned the reforms of King Amanullah in favor of a more gradual approach to modernization, but was assassinated in 1933 by Abdul Khaliq.

Mohammed Zahir Shah succeeded to the throne and reigned as king from 1933 to 1973. During the tribal revolts of 1944–1947, King Zahir's reign was challenged by Zadran, Safi, Mangal, and Wazir tribesmen led by Mazrak Zadran, Salemai, and Faqir of Ipi, among others – many of whom were Amanullah loyalists. Afghanistan joined the League of Nations in 1934. In the 1930s, the country experienced significant development of roads, infrastructure, the founding of a national bank, and increased education. Road links in the north played a large part in a growing cotton and textile industry. The country built close relationships with the Axis powers, with Nazi Germany having the largest share in Afghan development at the time.

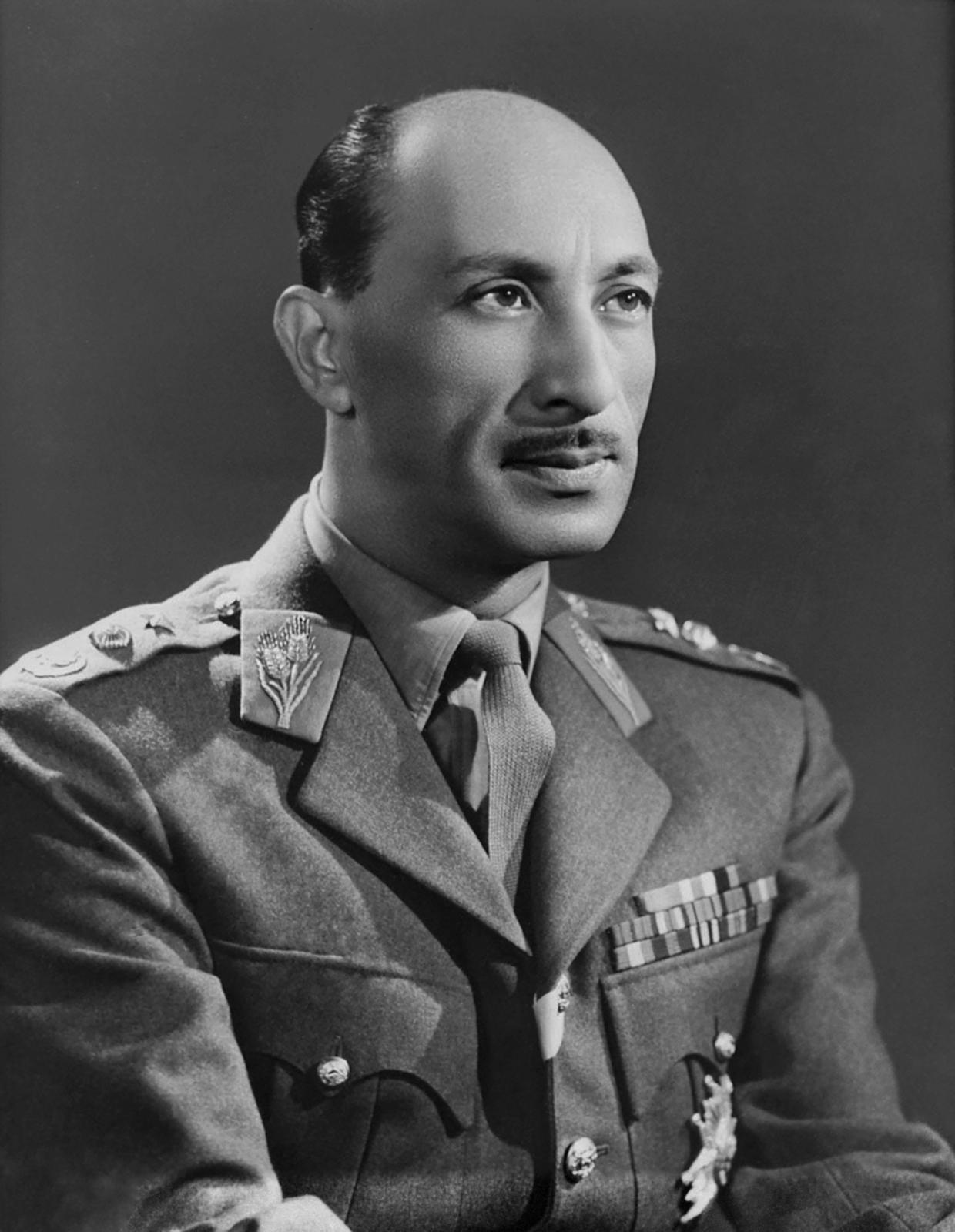
King Zahir, the last reigning monarch of Afghanistan, who reigned from 1933 until 1973

Until 1946, King Zahir ruled with the assistance of his uncle, who held the post of prime minister and continued the policies of Nadir Shah. Another uncle, Shah Mahmud Khan, became prime minister in 1946 and experimented with allowing greater political freedom. He was replaced in 1953 by Mohammed Daoud Khan, a staunch Pashtun nationalist who sought to create an independent Pashtunistan and incorporate it into Afghanistan, contributing to the highly tense relations between Afghanistan and Pakistan. Daoud Khan pressed for social modernization reforms and sought a closer relationship with the Soviet Union. Afterward, the 1964 constitution was formed, and the first non-royal prime minister was sworn in.

Zahir Shah, like his father Nadir Shah, had a policy of maintaining national independence while pursuing gradual modernization, creating nationalist feeling, and improving relations with the United Kingdom. Afghanistan was neither a participant in World War II nor aligned with either power bloc in the Cold War. However, it was a beneficiary of the latter rivalry as both the Soviet Union and the United States vied for influence by building Afghanistan's main highways, airports, and other vital infrastructure. On a per capita basis, Afghanistan received more Soviet development aid than any other country. In 1973, while the King was in Italy, Daoud Khan launched a bloodless coup and became the first president of Afghanistan, abolishing the monarchy.

=== Democratic Republic and Soviet War ===
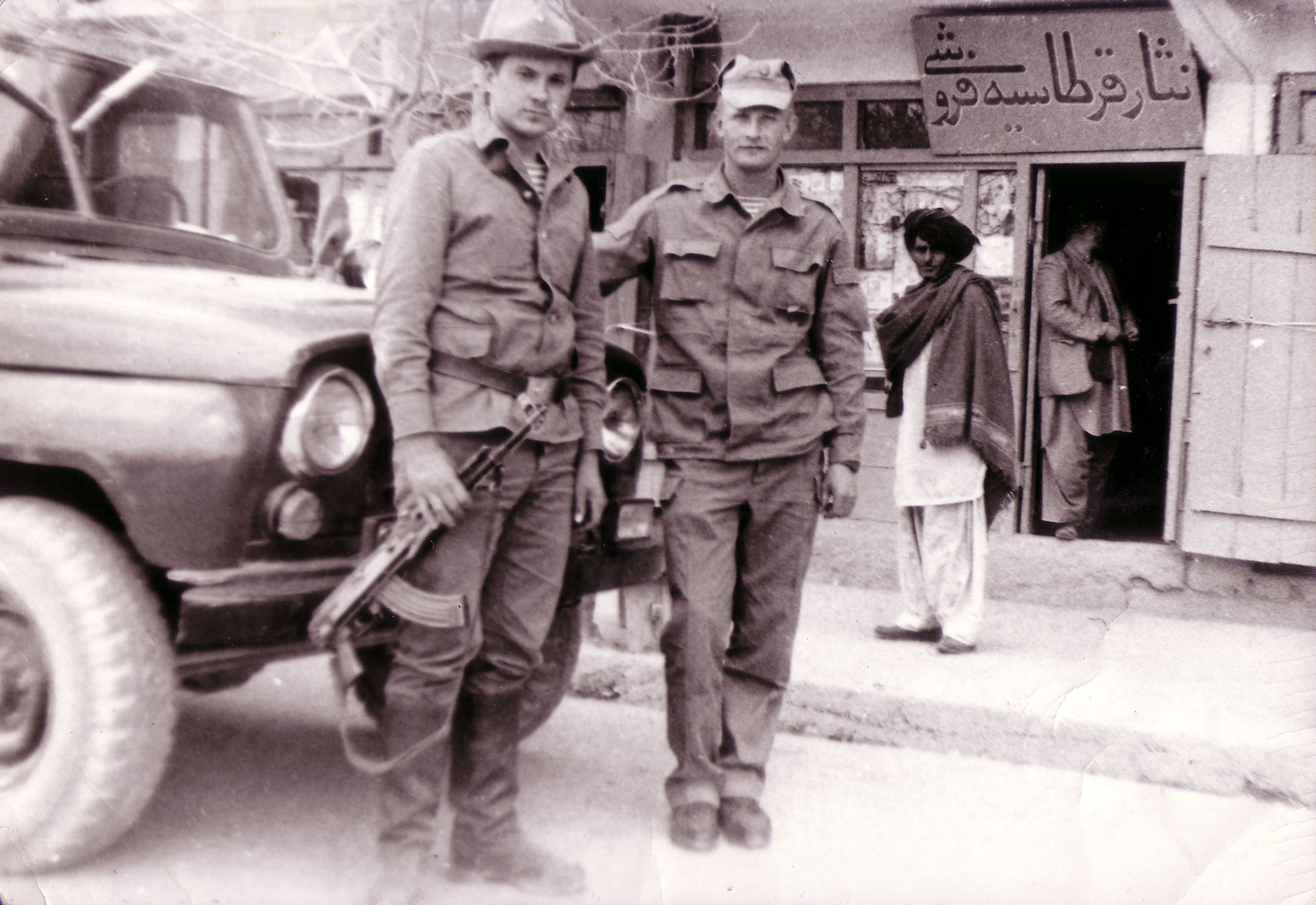
Soviet troops in Gardez, Afghanistan, in 1987

In April 1978, the communist People's Democratic Party of Afghanistan (PDPA) seized power in a bloody coup d'état against then-President Mohammed Daoud Khan, in what is called the Saur Revolution. The PDPA declared the establishment of the Democratic Republic of Afghanistan, with its first leader named as People's Democratic Party General Secretary Nur Muhammad Taraki. This would trigger a series of events that would dramatically turn Afghanistan from a peaceful (albeit poor and secluded) country to a hotbed of conflict and terrorism. The PDPA initiated various social, symbolic, and land distribution reforms that provoked strong opposition, while also brutally oppressing political dissidents. This caused unrest and quickly expanded into a state of civil war by 1979, waged by guerrilla mujahideen (and smaller Maoist guerrillas) against regime forces countrywide. It quickly turned into a proxy war as the Pakistani government provided these rebels with covert training centers, the United States supported them through Pakistan's Inter-Services Intelligence (ISI), and the Soviet Union sent thousands of military advisers to support the PDPA regime. Meanwhile, there was increasingly hostile friction between the competing factions of the PDPA – the dominant Khalq and the more moderate Parcham.

In October 1979, PDPA General Secretary Taraki was assassinated in an internal coup orchestrated by then-prime minister Hafizullah Amin, who became the new general secretary of the PDPA. The situation in the country deteriorated under Amin, and thousands of people went missing. Displeased with Amin's government, the Soviet Army invaded the country in December 1979, heading for Kabul and killing Amin. A Soviet-organized regime, led by Parcham's Babrak Karmal but inclusive of both factions (Parcham and Khalq), filled the vacuum. Soviet troops in more substantial numbers were deployed to stabilize Afghanistan under Karmal, marking the beginning of the Soviet–Afghan War. Lasting nine years, the war caused the deaths of between 562,000 and 2 million Afghans, (Note: Attributed to multiple sources:) and displaced about 6 million people who subsequently fled Afghanistan, mainly to Pakistan and Iran. Heavy air bombardment destroyed many countryside villages, millions of landmines were planted, and some cities such as Herat and Kandahar were also damaged from bombardment. After the Soviet withdrawal, another civil war ensued until the communist regime under PDPA leader Mohammad Najibullah collapsed in 1992.

The Soviet–Afghan War had drastic social effects on Afghanistan. The militarization of society led to heavily armed police, private bodyguards, openly armed civil defense groups, and the like becoming the norm in Afghanistan for decades thereafter. The traditional power structure had shifted from the clergy, community elders, intelligentsia, and military in favor of powerful warlords.

=== Post–Cold War conflict ===
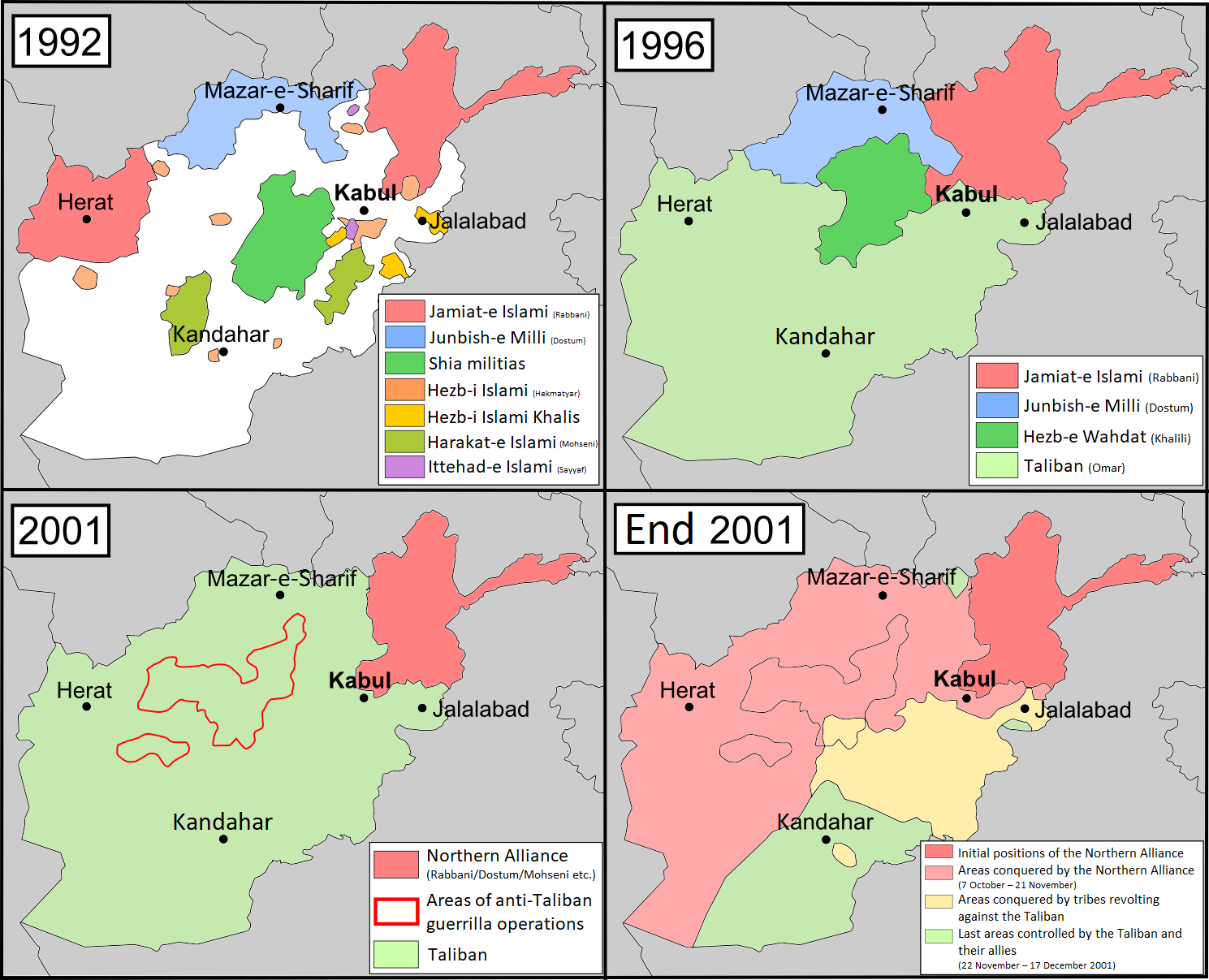
Development of the civil war from 1992 to late 2001

Another civil war broke out after the creation of a dysfunctional coalition government between leaders of various mujahideen factions. Amid a state of anarchy and factional infighting, various mujahideen factions committed widespread rape, murder, and extortion, while Kabul was heavily bombarded and partially destroyed by the fighting. Several failed reconciliations and alliances occurred between different leaders. The Taliban emerged in September 1994 as a movement and militia of students (talib) from Islamic madrassas (schools) in Pakistan, who soon had military support from Pakistan.

Taking control of Kandahar city that year, they conquered more territories until finally driving out the government of Rabbani from Kabul in 1996, where they established an emirate. The Taliban were condemned internationally for the harsh enforcement of their interpretation of Islamic sharia law, which resulted in the brutal treatment of many Afghans, especially women. During their rule, the Taliban and their allies committed massacres against Afghan civilians, denied UN food supplies to starving civilians, and conducted a policy of scorched earth, burning vast areas of fertile land and destroying tens of thousands of homes. (Note: Attributed to multiple sources:)

After the fall of Kabul to the Taliban, Ahmad Shah Massoud and Abdul Rashid Dostum formed the Northern Alliance, later joined by others, to resist the Taliban. Dostum's forces were defeated by the Taliban during the Battles of Mazar-i-Sharif in 1997 and 1998; Pakistan's Chief of Army Staff, Pervez Musharraf, began sending thousands of Pakistani militants to help the Taliban defeat the Northern Alliance. (Note: Attributed to multiple sources:) By 2000, the Northern Alliance only controlled 10% of the territory, cornered in the northeast. On 9 September 2001, Massoud was assassinated by two Arab suicide attackers in Panjshir Valley. Around 400,000 Afghans died in internal conflicts between 1990 and 2001.

=== US invasion and the Islamic Republic ===
In October 2001, the United States invaded Afghanistan to remove the Taliban from power after they refused to hand over Osama bin Laden, the prime suspect of the September 11 attacks, who was a "guest" of the Taliban and was operating his al-Qaeda network in Afghanistan. The majority of Afghans supported the American invasion. During the initial invasion, US and UK forces bombed al-Qaeda training camps, and later, in cooperation with the Northern Alliance, the Taliban regime came to an end.

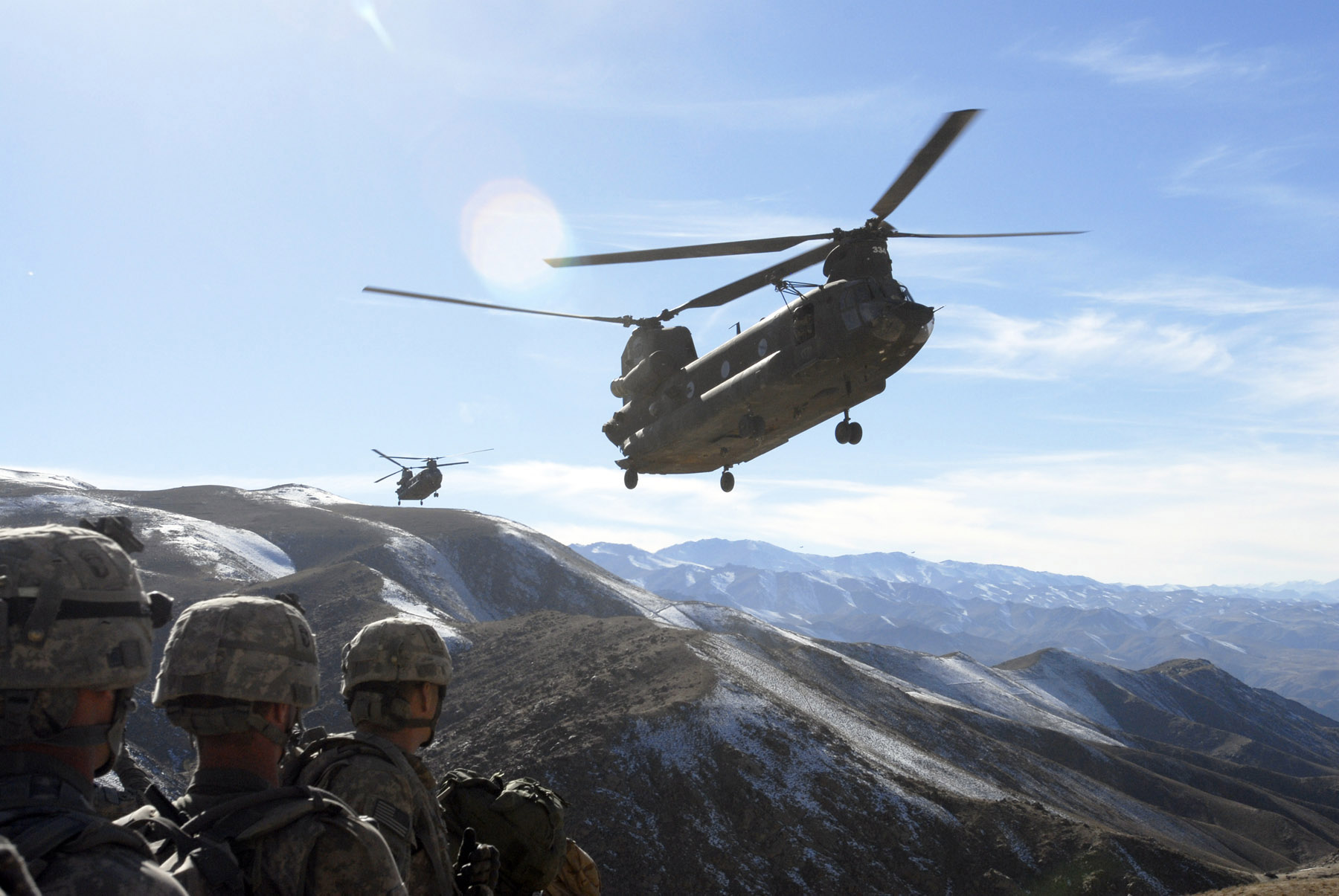
US troops and Chinooks in Afghanistan, 2008

In December 2001, after the Taliban government was overthrown, the Afghan Interim Administration under Hamid Karzai was formed. The International Security Assistance Force (ISAF) was established by the United Nations Security Council to assist the Karzai administration and provide basic security. By this time, after two decades of war as well as an acute famine at the time, Afghanistan had one of the highest infant and child mortality rates in the world, the lowest life expectancy, much of the population suffered from hunger and malnutrition, and infrastructure was in ruins. Many foreign donors started providing aid and assistance to rebuild the war-torn country. As coalition troops entered Afghanistan to help the rebuilding process, the Taliban began an insurgency to regain control. Afghanistan remained one of the poorest countries in the world because of a lack of foreign investment, government corruption, and the Taliban insurgency.

The Afghan government was able to establish some democratic structures, adopting a constitution in 2004 with the name Islamic Republic of Afghanistan. Attempts were made, often with the support of foreign donor countries, to improve the country's economy, healthcare, education, transport, and agriculture. ISAF forces also began to train the Afghan National Security Forces. Following 2002, nearly five million Afghans were repatriated. The number of NATO troops present in Afghanistan peaked at 140,000 in 2011, dropping to approximately 16,000 in 2018. In September 2014, Ashraf Ghani became president after the 2014 Afghan presidential election, in which, for the first time in Afghanistan's history, power was democratically transferred. On 28 December 2014, NATO formally ended ISAF combat operations and transferred full security responsibility to the Afghan government. The NATO-led Operation Resolute Support was formed the same day as a successor to ISAF. Thousands of NATO troops remained in the country to train and advise Afghan government forces and continue their fight against the Taliban. A report titled Body Count concluded that 106,000–170,000 civilians had been killed as a result of the fighting in Afghanistan at the hands of all parties to the conflict.

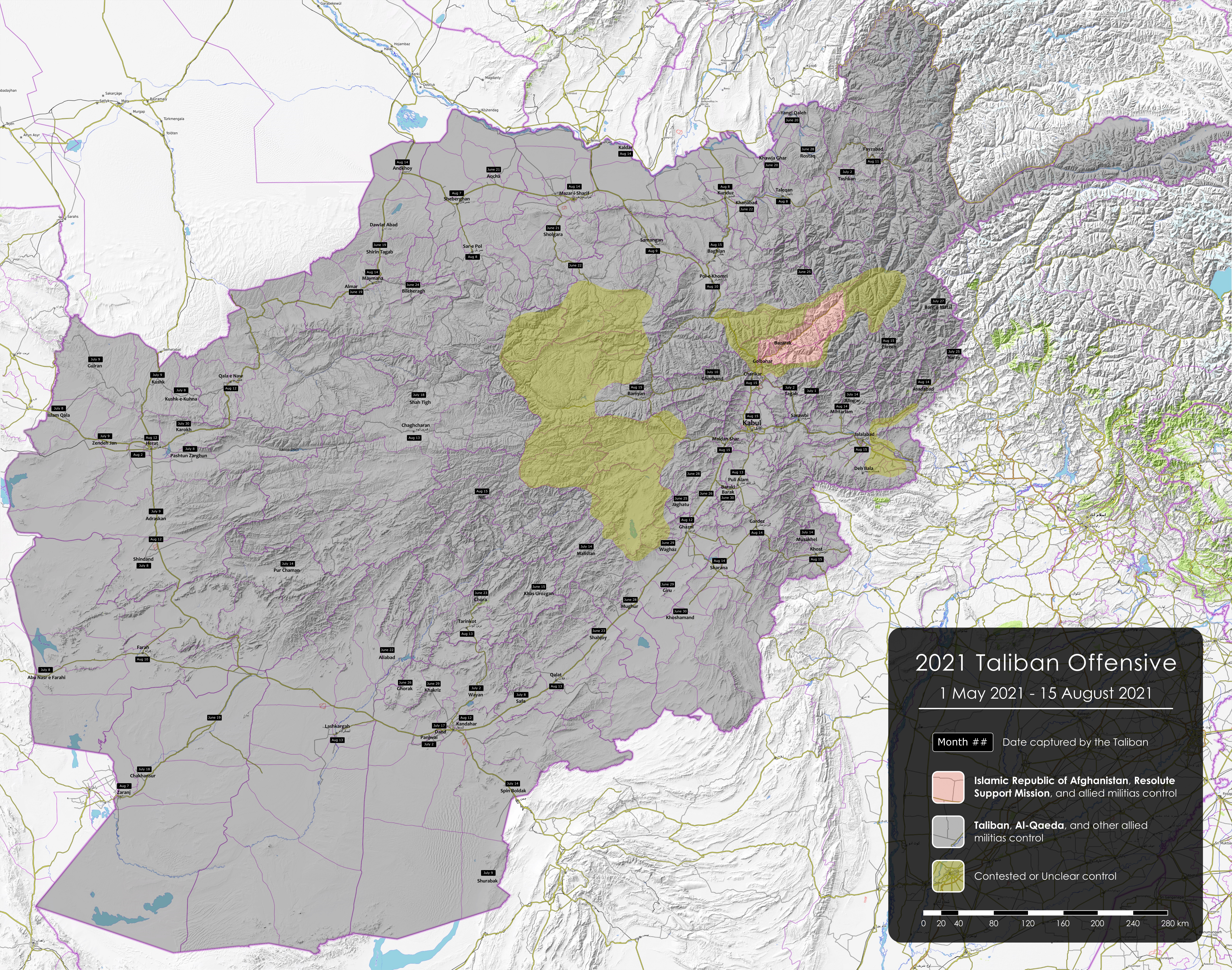
A map of Afghanistan showing the 2021 Taliban offensive

On 19 February 2020, the United States–Taliban deal was made in Qatar. The deal was one of the critical events that caused the collapse of the Afghan National Security Forces (ANSF); following the signing of the deal, the US dramatically reduced the number of air attacks and deprived the ANSF of a critical edge in fighting the Taliban insurgency, leading to the Taliban takeover of Kabul.

=== Second Taliban era (2021–present) ===
NATO Secretary General Jens Stoltenberg announced on 14 April 2021 that the alliance had agreed to start withdrawing its troops from Afghanistan by 1 May. Soon after NATO troops began withdrawing, the Taliban launched an offensive against the Afghan government and quickly advanced in front of collapsing Afghan government forces. The Taliban captured the capital city of Kabul on 15 August 2021, after regaining control over a vast majority of Afghanistan. Several foreign diplomats and Afghan government officials, including President Ashraf Ghani, were evacuated from the country, with many Afghan civilians attempting to flee along with them. On 17 August, first vice president Amrullah Saleh proclaimed himself caretaker president and announced the formation of an anti-Taliban front with a reported 6,000+ troops in the Panjshir Valley, along with Ahmad Massoud. However, by 6 September, the Taliban had taken control of most of Panjshir Province, with resistance fighters retreating to the mountains. Clashes in the valley ceased in mid-September.

According to the Costs of War Project, 176,000 people were killed in the conflict, including 46,319 civilians, between 2001 and 2021. According to the Uppsala Conflict Data Program, at least 212,191 people were killed in the conflict. Though the state of war in the country ended in 2021, armed conflict persists in some regions amid fighting between the Taliban and the local branch of the Islamic State, as well as an anti-Taliban Republican insurgency.

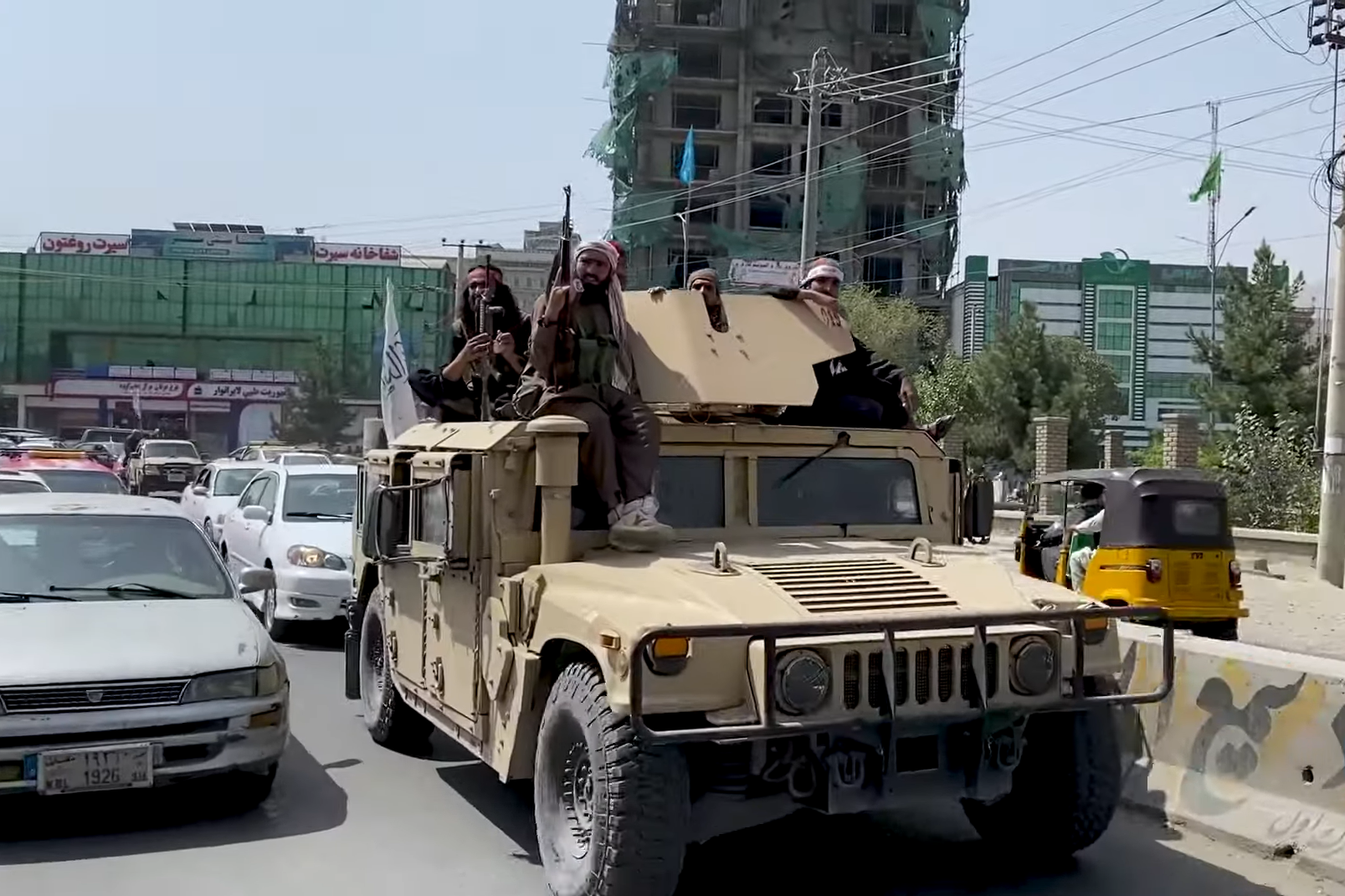
Taliban fighters in Kabul on a captured Humvee following the 2021 fall of Kabul

The Taliban government is led by supreme leader Hibatullah Akhundzada and prime minister Hasan Akhund, who took office on 7 September 2021. Akhund is one of the four founders of the Taliban and was a deputy prime minister of the previous emirate; his appointment was seen as a compromise between moderates and hardliners. A new, all-male cabinet was formed, which included Abdul Hakim Haqqani as minister of justice. On 20 September 2021, United Nations Secretary-General António Guterres received a letter from acting minister of foreign affairs Amir Khan Muttaqi to formally claim Afghanistan's seat as a member state for their official spokesman in Doha, Suhail Shaheen. The United Nations did not recognize the previous Taliban government and chose to work with the then government-in-exile instead.

Western nations suspended most of their humanitarian aid to Afghanistan following the Taliban's August 2021 takeover of the country; the World Bank and International Monetary Fund also halted their payments. More than half of Afghanistan's 39 million people faced an acute food shortage in October 2021. Human Rights Watch reported on 11 November 2021 that Afghanistan was facing widespread famine due to an economic and banking crisis.

The Taliban initially significantly tackled corruption, improving on the corruption perceptions index from 174th to 150th out of 180 countries from 2021 to 2022, but dropping to 162nd in 2023. The Taliban have also reportedly reduced bribery and extortion in public service areas.

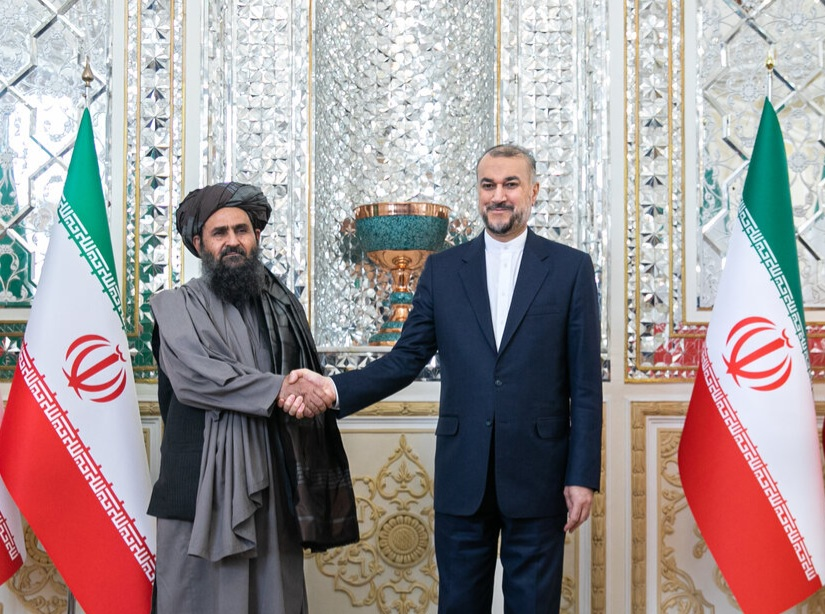
A Taliban official with Iranian Foreign Minister Hossein Amir-Abdollahian in 2023

At the same time, the human rights situation in the country has deteriorated. Following the 2001 invasion, more than 5.7 million refugees returned to Afghanistan; however, in 2021, 2.6 million Afghans remained refugees, primarily in Iran and Pakistan, and another 4 million were internally displaced.

In October 2023, the Pakistani government ordered the expulsion of Afghans from Pakistan. Iran also decided to deport Afghan nationals back to Afghanistan. Taliban authorities condemned the deportations of Afghans as an "inhuman act". Afghanistan faced a humanitarian crisis in late 2023.

On 10 November 2024, Afghanistan's Foreign Ministry confirmed that Taliban representatives would attend the 2024 United Nations Climate Change Conference, marking the first time the country participated since the Taliban's return to power in 2021. Afghanistan had been barred from previous summits due to the lack of global recognition of the Taliban regime. In May 2025, Iran ordered the mass deportation of an estimated 4 million Afghan migrants and refugees.

The 2025–2026 hunger crisis in Afghanistan is one of the world's most severe, with over 17 million people—one-third of the population—requiring urgent food assistance. Driven by persistent drought, economic collapse, and massive refugee returns, the crisis has left over 4.9 million children and women needing malnutrition treatment.

The Taliban has been accused by Pakistan of officially supporting and providing safe haven to the Pakistani Taliban (TTP) and other militant groups that attack Pakistani soil, accusations which have been denied by the Taliban. Tensions between both countries led to a direct war in February 2026.

== Geography ==
Afghanistan is located in Southern-Central Asia. The region centered in Afghanistan is considered the "crossroads of Asia", and the country has had the nickname Heart of Asia. The renowned Urdu poet Allama Iqbal once wrote about the country:

Asia is a body of water and earth, of which the Afghan nation is the heart. From its discord, the discord of Asia; and from its accord, the accord of Asia.

At over 652,864 km^{2} (252,072 sq mi), Afghanistan is the world's 41st largest country. It is slightly bigger than France and smaller than Myanmar, and about the size of Texas in the United States. There is no coastline, as Afghanistan is landlocked. Afghanistan shares its longest land border (the Durand Line) with Pakistan to the east and south, followed by borders with Tajikistan to the northeast, Iran to the west, Turkmenistan to the north-west, Uzbekistan to the north, and China to the far northeast; India claims a border with Afghanistan through Pakistani-administered Kashmir. Clockwise from south-west, Afghanistan shares borders with the Sistan and Baluchestan Province, South Khorasan Province, and Razavi Khorasan Province of Iran; Ahal Region, Mary Region, and Lebap Region of Turkmenistan; Surxondaryo Region of Uzbekistan; Khatlon Region and Gorno-Badakhshan Autonomous Region of Tajikistan; Xinjiang Uyghur Autonomous Region of China; and the Gilgit-Baltistan territory, Khyber Pakhtunkhwa province, and Balochistan province of Pakistan.

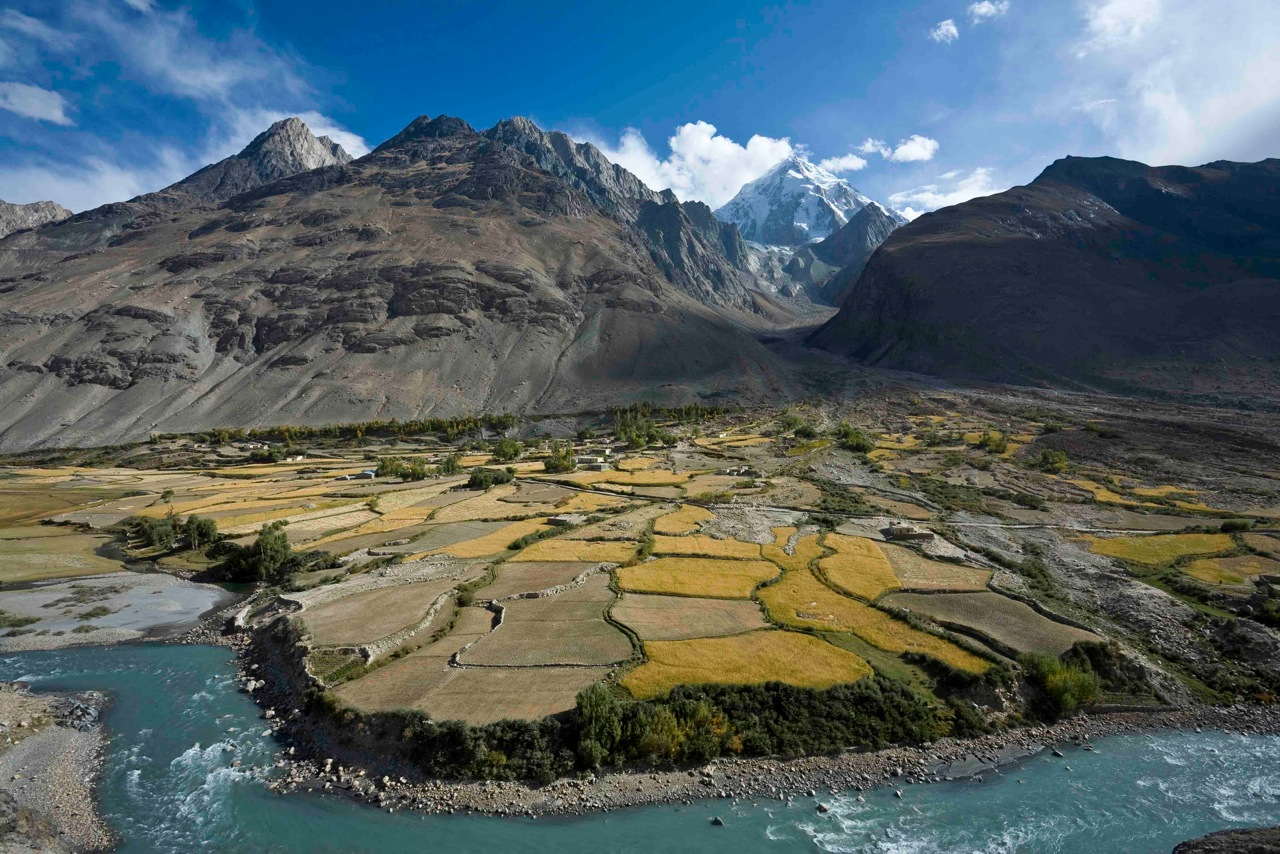
Floodplain cultivation in the Wakhan Corridor, Pamir Mountains

The geography in Afghanistan is varied, but is mostly mountainous and rugged, with some unusual mountain ridges accompanied by plateaus and river basins. It is dominated by the Hindu Kush range, the western extension of the Himalayas that stretches to eastern Tibet via the Pamir Mountains and Karakoram Mountains in Afghanistan's far north-east. Most of the highest points are in the east, consisting of fertile mountain valleys, often considered part of the "Roof of the World". The Hindu Kush ends at the west-central highlands, creating plains in the north and southwest, namely the Turkestan Plains and the Sistan Basin; these two regions consist of rolling grasslands and semi-deserts, as well as hot, windy deserts, respectively. Forests exist in the corridor between the provinces of Nuristan and Paktika (see East Afghan montane conifer forests), and tundra in the northeast. The country's highest point is Noshaq, at 7,492 m (24,580 ft) above sea level. The lowest point is located in Jowzjan Province along the Amu River bank, at 258 m (846 ft) above sea level.

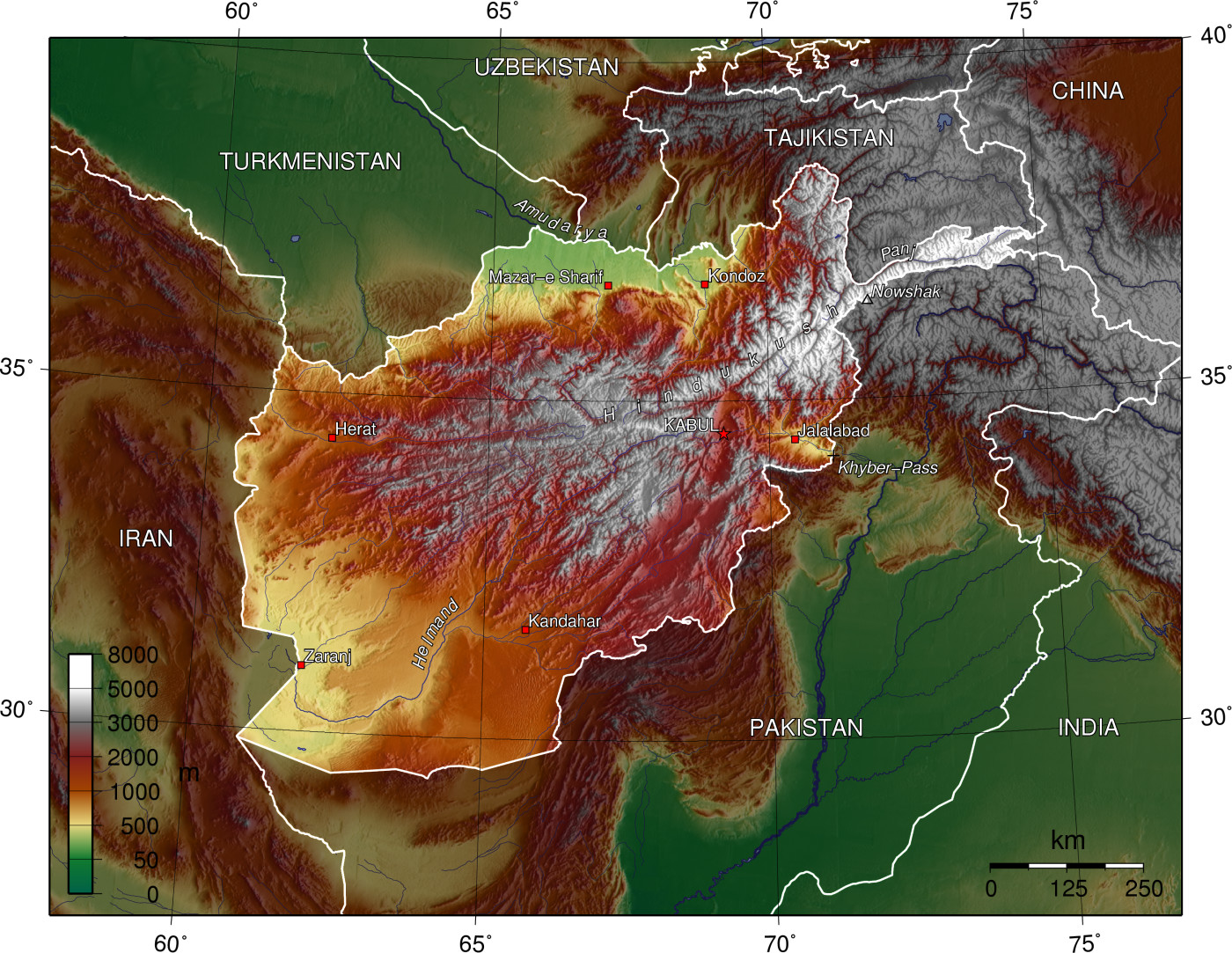
The mountainous topography of Afghanistan

Despite having numerous rivers and reservoirs, large parts of the country are dry. The endorheic Sistan Basin is one of the world's driest regions. The Amu Darya rises in the north of the Hindu Kush, while the nearby Hari River flows west towards Herat, and the Arghandab River flows from the central region southwards. To the south and west of the Hindu Kush flow a number of streams that are tributaries of the Indus River, such as the Helmand River. The Kabul River flows in an easterly direction to the Indus, ending at the Indian Ocean. Afghanistan receives heavy snow during the winter in the Hindu Kush and Pamir Mountains, and the melting snow in the spring season enters the rivers, lakes, and streams. However, two-thirds of the country's water flows into the neighboring countries of Iran, Pakistan, and Turkmenistan. As reported in 2010, the state needs more than US$2 billion to rehabilitate its irrigation systems so that the water is properly managed.

In Afghanistan, forest cover accounts for approximately 2% of the total land area, equivalent to 1,208,440 hectares (ha) of forest in 2020, which remained unchanged since 1990. Of the naturally regenerating forest, 0% was reported to be primary forest (consisting of native tree species with no clearly visible indications of human activity), and around 0% of the forest area was found within protected areas. For the year 2015, 100% of the forest area was reported to be under public ownership.

The northeastern Hindu Kush mountain range, located in and around the Badakhshan Province of Afghanistan, is situated in a geologically active area where earthquakes occur almost every year. They can be deadly and destructive, causing landslides in some parts or avalanches during the winter. In June 2022, a destructive 5.9 earthquake struck near the border with Pakistan, killing at least 1,150 people and sparking fears of a major humanitarian crisis. On 7 October 2023, a 6.3 magnitude earthquake struck northwest of Herat, killing over 1,400 people.

=== Climate ===
Köppen climate map of Afghanistan

Afghanistan has a continental climate with harsh winters in the central highlands, the glaciated northeast (around Nuristan), and the Wakhan Corridor, where the average temperature in January is below −15 °C (5 °F) and can reach −26 °C (−15 °F), and hot summers in the low-lying areas of the Sistan Basin of the southwest, the Jalalabad basin in the east, and the Turkestan plains along the Amu River in the north, where temperatures average over 35 °C (95 °F) in July and can go over 43 °C (109 °F). The country is generally arid in the summers, with most rainfall falling between December and April. The lower areas of northern and western Afghanistan are the driest, with precipitation more common in the east. Although proximate to India, Afghanistan is mostly outside the monsoon zone, except the Nuristan Province, which occasionally receives summer monsoon rain.

Although Afghanistan has contributed minimally to global greenhouse gas emissions, it is one of the most vulnerable countries to climate change and least prepared to cope with its impacts. Climate change in Afghanistan is causing more frequent and severe droughts. Severe drought conditions affect 25 of the country's 34 provinces, impacting over half the population. These droughts cause desertification, reduce food and water security, disrupt agriculture, and cause internal displacement. Extreme rainfall over short periods is also more likely, increasing the risk of floods and landslides. Due to rising temperatures, almost 14% of Afghanistan's glacier coverage was lost between 1990 and 2015, increasing the risk of glacial lake outburst floods. By 2050, climate change could displace an additional 5 million people within Afghanistan.

=== Biodiversity ===
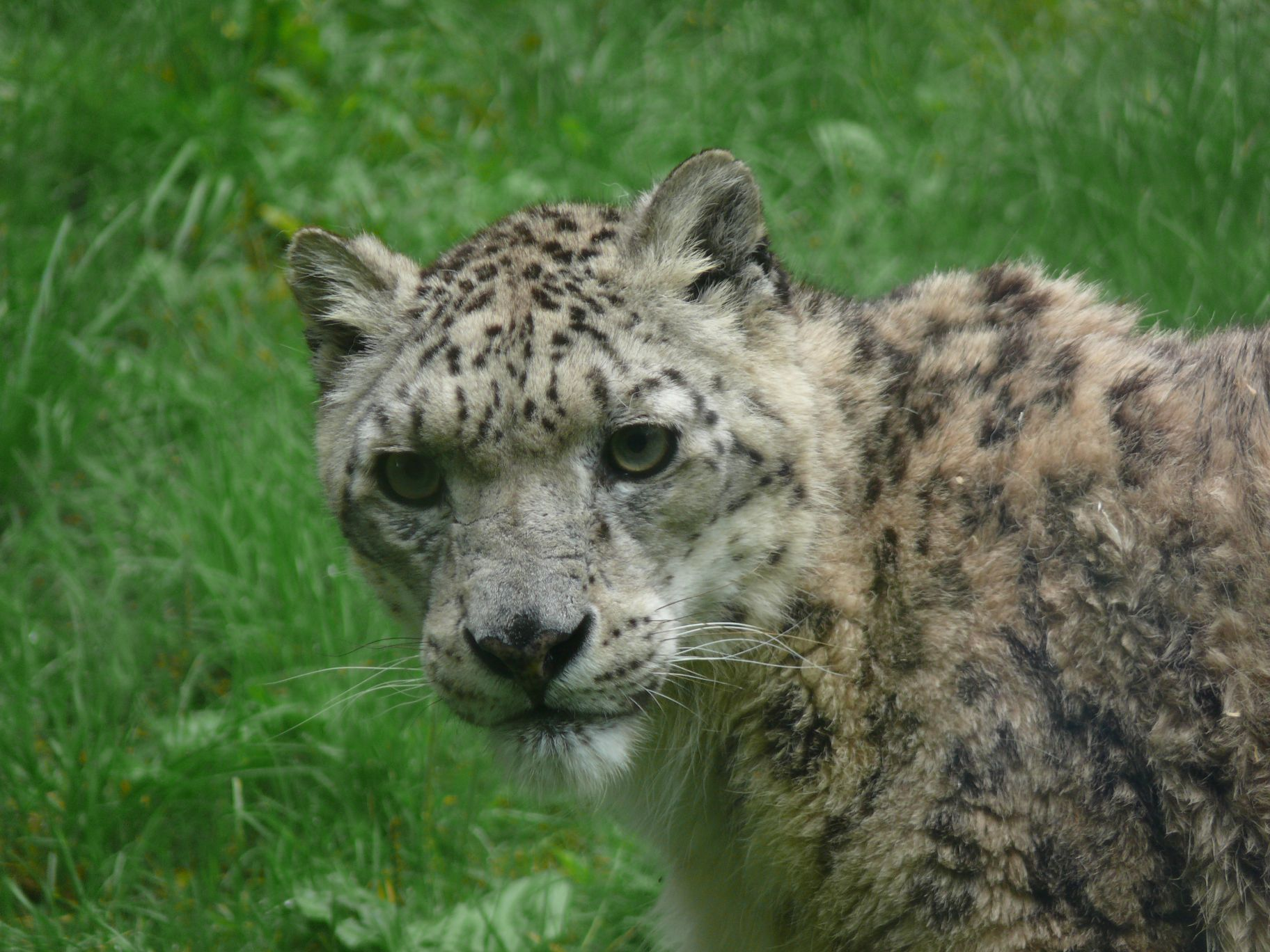
The snow leopard is the official national animal of Afghanistan.

Several types of mammals exist throughout Afghanistan. Snow leopards and brown bears live in the high elevation alpine tundra regions. The Marco Polo sheep exclusively live in the Wakhan Corridor region of north-east Afghanistan. Foxes, wolves, otters, deer, wild sheep, lynx and other big cats populate the mountain forest region of the east. In the semi-desert northern plains, wildlife include a variety of birds, hedgehogs, gophers, and large carnivores such as jackals and hyenas.

Gazelles, wild pigs and jackals populate the steppe plains of the south and west, while mongoose and cheetahs exist in the semi-desert south. Marmots and ibex also live in the high mountains of Afghanistan, and pheasants exist in some parts of the country. The Afghan hound is a native breed of dog known for its fast speed and its long hair; it is relatively known in the west.

Endemic fauna of Afghanistan includes the Afghan flying squirrel, Afghan snowfinch, Paradactylodon (or the "Paghman mountain salamander"), Stigmella kasyi, Vulcaniella kabulensis, Afghan leopard gecko, Wheeleria parviflorellus, among others. Endemic flora include Iris afghanica. Afghanistan has a wide variety of birds despite its relatively arid climate – an estimated 460 species of which 235 breed within.

The forest region of Afghanistan has vegetation such as pine trees, spruce trees, fir trees and larches, whereas the steppe grassland regions consist of broadleaf trees, short grass, perennial plants and shrublands. The colder high elevation regions are composed of hardy grasses and small flowering plants. Several regions are designated protected areas; there are three national parks: Band-e Amir, Wakhan and Nuristan. Afghanistan had a 2018 Forest Landscape Integrity Index mean score of 8.85/10, ranking it 15th globally out of 172 countries.

== Government and politics ==
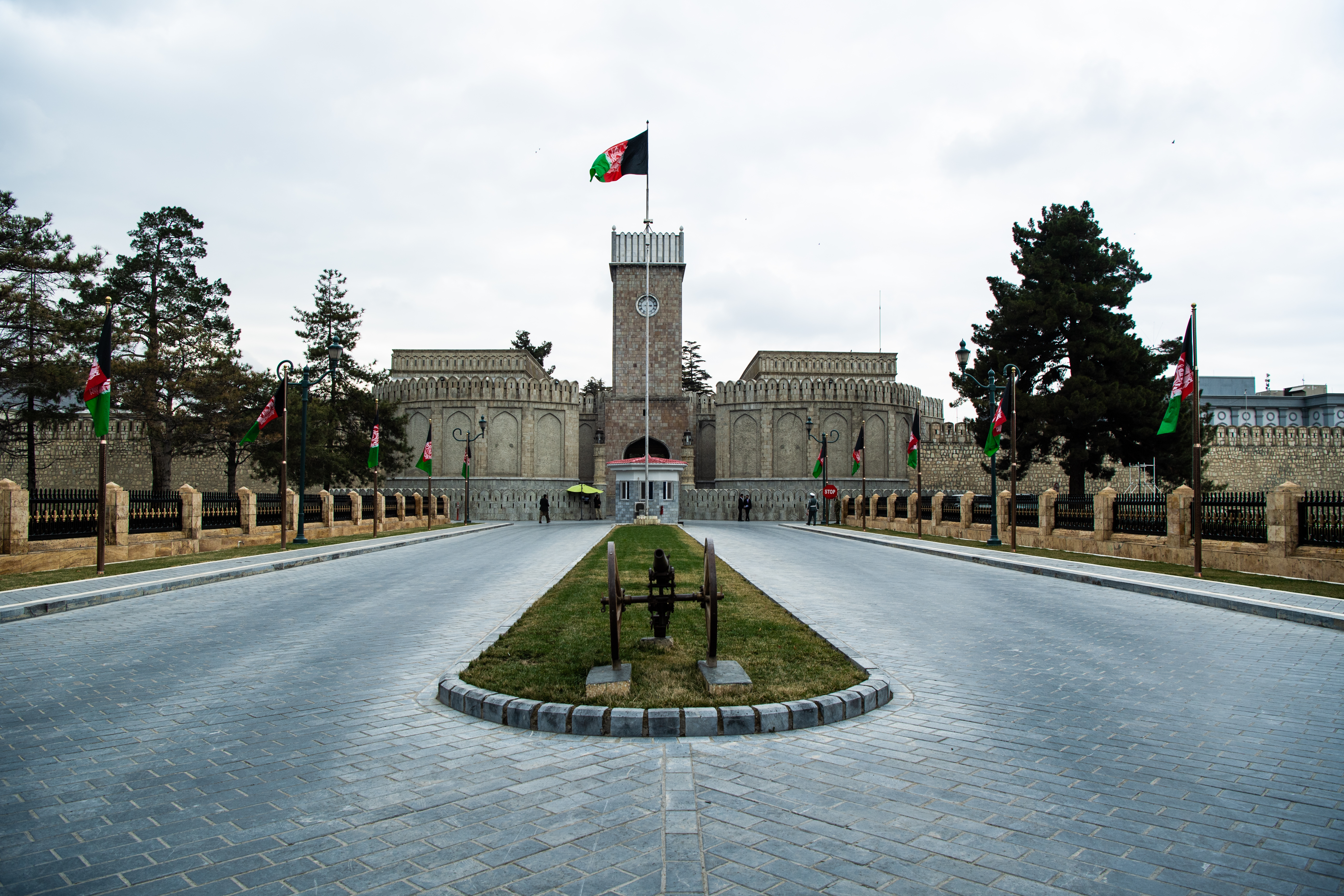
The Arg (the Presidential palace) in Kabul, photographed in 2020

Following the effective collapse of the Islamic Republic of Afghanistan during the 2021 Taliban offensive, the Taliban declared the country an Islamic Emirate. A new caretaker government was announced on 7 September. As of July 2025, only the Russian Federation has recognized the Islamic Emirate of Afghanistan as the de jure government of Afghanistan. In the V-Dem Democracy Indices, Afghanistan ranks amongst the lowest as a "closed autocracy," ranking at 176th and 177th out of 179 countries in electoral democracy and liberal democracy indices respectively. Afghanistan operates on a centralised unitary form of government.

A traditional instrument of governance in Afghanistan is the loya jirga (grand assembly), a Pashtun consultative meeting that was mainly organized for choosing a new head of state, adopting a new constitution, or to settle national or regional issue such as war. Loya jirgas have been held since at least 1747, with the most recent one occurring from June to July 2022.

=== Development of Taliban government ===
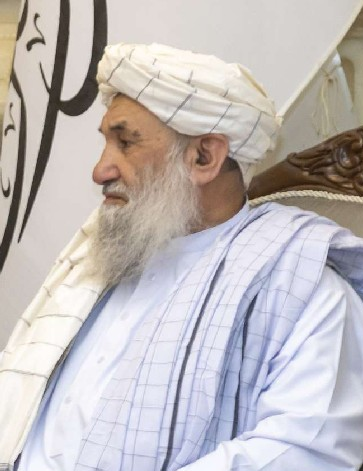
Hasan Akhund
Prime Minister

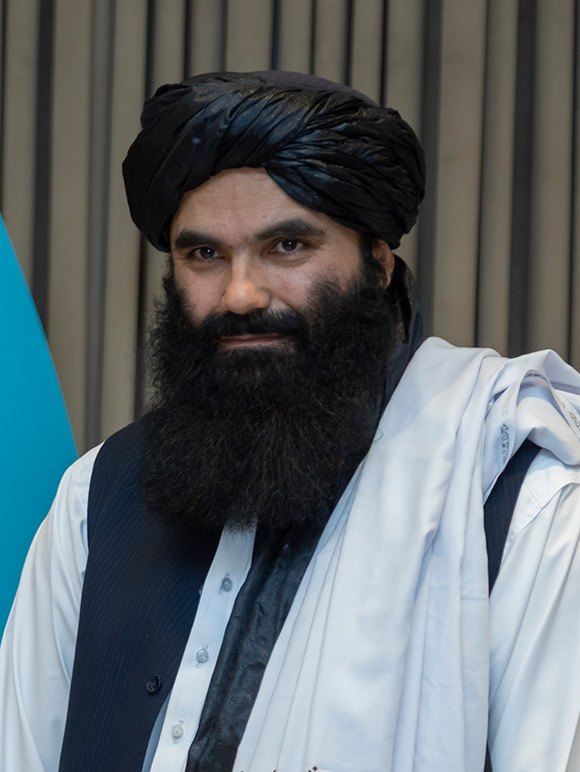
Sirajuddin Haqqani
First Deputy Leader and Interior Minister

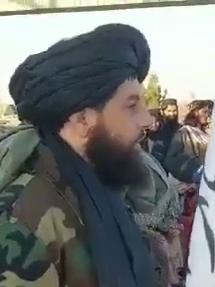
Mullah Yaqoob
Second Deputy Leader and Defense Minister

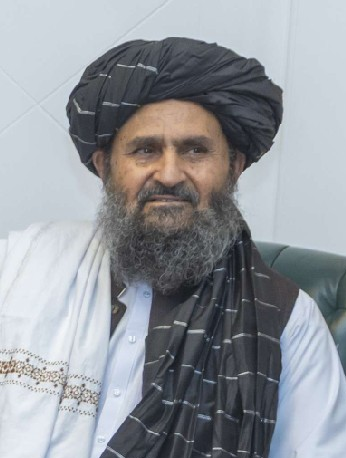
Abdul Ghani Baradar
Third Deputy Leader and First Deputy Prime Minister

On 17 August 2021, the leader of the Taliban-affiliated Hezb-e-Islami Gulbuddin party, Gulbuddin Hekmatyar, met with both Hamid Karzai, the former President of Afghanistan, and Abdullah Abdullah, the former chairman of the High Council for National Reconciliation and former Chief Executive, in Doha, Qatar, with the aim of forming a national unity government. President Ashraf Ghani, having fled the country during the Taliban advance to either Tajikistan or Uzbekistan, emerged in the United Arab Emirates and said that he supported such negotiations and was in talks to return to Afghanistan. The 2004 constitution was essentially abolished on 15 August 2021, with the overthrow and dissolution of the Islamic Republic of Afghanistan by the Taliban. In August 2022, it was confirmed to the public that Supreme Leader Hibatullah Akhundzada had earlier formally abolished the 2004 Constitution on his authority.

Hours after the final flight of American troops left Kabul on 30 August, a Taliban official interviewed said that a new government would likely be announced as early as Friday 3 September after Jumu'ah. It was added that Hibatullah Akhundzada would be officially named Emir, with cabinet ministers being revealed at the Arg in an official ceremony. Abdul Ghani Baradar would be named head of government as Prime Minister, while other important positions would go to Sirajuddin Haqqani and Mullah Yaqoob. Beneath the supreme leader, day-to-day governance will be entrusted to the cabinet.

In a report by CNN-News18, sources said the new government was going to be governed similarly to Iran with Hibatullah Akhundzada as supreme leader similar to the role of Saayid Ali Khamenei, and would be based out of Kandahar. Baradar or Yaqoob would be head of government as Prime minister. The government's ministries and agencies will be under a cabinet presided over by the Prime Minister. The Supreme Leader would preside over an executive body known as the Supreme Council with anywhere from 11 to 72 members. Abdul Hakim Haqqani is likely to be promoted to Chief justice. According to the report, the new government will take place within the framework of an amended 1964 Constitution of Afghanistan. Government formation was delayed due to concerns about forming a broad-based government acceptable to the international community. It was later added however that the Taliban's Rahbari Shura, the group's leadership council was divided between the hardline Haqqani Network and moderate Abdul Ghani Baradar over appointments needed to form an "inclusive" government. Reports claimed that this culminated in a skirmish which led to Baradar being injured and treated in Pakistan, however this was denied by Baradar himself.

As of early September 2021 the Taliban were planning the cabinet to be men-only. Journalists and other human rights activists, mostly women, protested in Herat and Kabul, calling for women to be included. The acting Cabinet announced on 7 September was men-only, and the Ministry of Women's Affairs was abolished. In a decree by Hibatullah Akhundzada on 15 August 2025, the description of the government as interim was dropped, with all ministers remaining in their posts, but on a permanent rather than acting basis.

As of July 2025, only Russia has recognized the Taliban government as the legitimate authorities of Afghanistan. The U.N has stated that recognition was impossible so long as restrictions on female education and employment remained.

On 16 September 2024, the Taliban suspended polio vaccination campaigns in Afghanistan, as reported by the United Nations, posing a significant risk to global polio eradication efforts, though multiple national and sub-national polio vaccination campaigns were subsequently carried out in 2025 and 2026.

=== Administrative divisions ===
Afghanistan is administratively divided into 34 provinces (wilayat). Each province has a governor and a capital. The country is further divided into nearly 400 provincial districts, each of which normally covers a city or several villages. Each district is represented by a district governor.

The provincial governors are now appointed by the Prime Minister of Afghanistan, and the district governors are selected by the provincial governors. The provincial governors are representatives of the central government in Kabul and are responsible for all administrative and formal issues within their provinces. There are also provincial councils that are elected through direct and general elections for four years. The functions of provincial councils are to take part in provincial development planning and to participate in the monitoring and appraisal of other provincial governance institutions.

According to article 140 of the constitution and the presidential decree on electoral law, mayors of cities should be elected through free and direct elections for a four-year term. In practice however, mayors are appointed by the government.

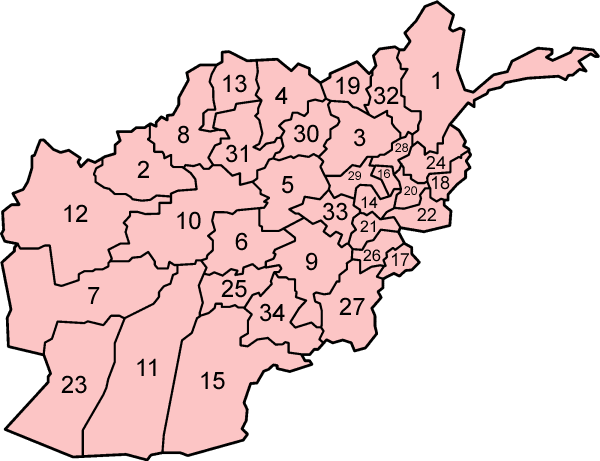
Afghanistan is divided into 34 provinces, which are further divided into a number of districts.

The 34 provinces in alphabetical order are:

1. Badakhshan
2. Badghis
3. Baghlan
4. Balkh
5. Bamyan
6. Daykundi
7. Farah
8. Faryab
9. Ghazni
10. Ghor
11. Helmand
12. Herat
13. Jowzjan
14. Kabul
15. Kandahar
16. Kapisa
17. Khost
18. Kunar
19. Kunduz
20. Laghman
21. Logar
22. Nangarhar
23. Nimruz
24. Nuristan
25. Oruzgan
26. Paktia
27. Paktika
28. Panjshir
29. Parwan
30. Samangan
31. Sar-e Pol
32. Takhar
33. Wardak
34. Zabul

=== Foreign relations ===
Afghanistan became a member of the United Nations in 1946. Historically, Afghanistan had strong relations with Germany, one of the first countries to recognize Afghanistan's independence in 1919; the Soviet Union, which provided much aid and military training for Afghanistan's forces and includes the signing of a Treaty of Friendship in 1921 and 1978; and India, with which a friendship treaty was signed in 1950. Relations with Pakistan have often been tense for various reasons such as the Durand Line border issue and alleged Pakistani involvement in Afghan insurgent groups.

The present Islamic Emirate of Afghanistan is currently partially recognized, but has had notable unofficial ties with China, Pakistan, and Qatar. Under the previous Islamic Republic of Afghanistan, it enjoyed cordial relations with a number of NATO and allied nations, particularly the United States, Canada, United Kingdom, Germany, Australia, and Turkey. In 2012, the United States and the then-republic in Afghanistan signed their Strategic Partnership Agreement in which Afghanistan became a major non-NATO ally. Such qualification was rescinded by US President Joe Biden in July 2022.

=== Military ===
The Armed Forces of the Islamic Emirate of Afghanistan captured a large amount of weapons, hardware, vehicles, aerocrafts, and equipment from the Afghan National Security Forces following the 2021 Taliban offensive and the Fall of Kabul. The total value of the captured equipment has been estimated at US$83 billion.

=== Human rights ===
Homosexuality is taboo in Afghan society; according to the Penal Code, homosexual intimacy is punished by up to a year in prison. Under Sharia law offenders can be punished by death. However, an ancient tradition involving male homosexual acts between children and older men (typically wealthy warlords or elite people) called bacha bazi persists albeit punishable by the death penalty under Taliban law.

Religious minorities such as Sikhs, Hindus, and Christians have reportedly faced persecution.

Since May 2022, all women in Afghanistan have been required by law to wear full-body coverings when in public (either a burqa or an abaya paired with a niqāb, which leaves only the eyes uncovered). First Deputy Leader Sirajuddin Haqqani claimed the decree is only advisory and no form of hijab is compulsory in Afghanistan, though this contradicts the reality. It has been speculated that there is a genuine internal policy division over women's rights between hardliners, including leader Hibatullah Akhundzada, and pragmatists, though they publicly present a united front. Another decree was issued shortly after the first, requiring female TV presenters to cover their faces during broadcasts. Since the Taliban takeover, suicides among women have become more common, and the country could now be one of the few where the rate of suicide among women surpasses that among men.

In May 2022, the Taliban dissolved Afghanistan's Human Rights Commission along with four other government departments, citing the country's budget deficit.

In January 2025, the International Criminal Court issued two warrants against the Taliban supreme leader Haibatullah Akhundzada and the Chief judge, Abdul Hakim Haqqani, for committing crimes against humanity with the oppression and persecution of Afghan women and girls, and deprived of their freedom of movement, the rights to control their bodies, to education, and to a private and family life, while the alleged resistance and opposition were brutally suppressed with murder, imprisonment, torture, rape, and other forms of sexual violence, since 2021. ICC member states are obliged to arrest wanted persons if they are on their territory.

== Economy ==
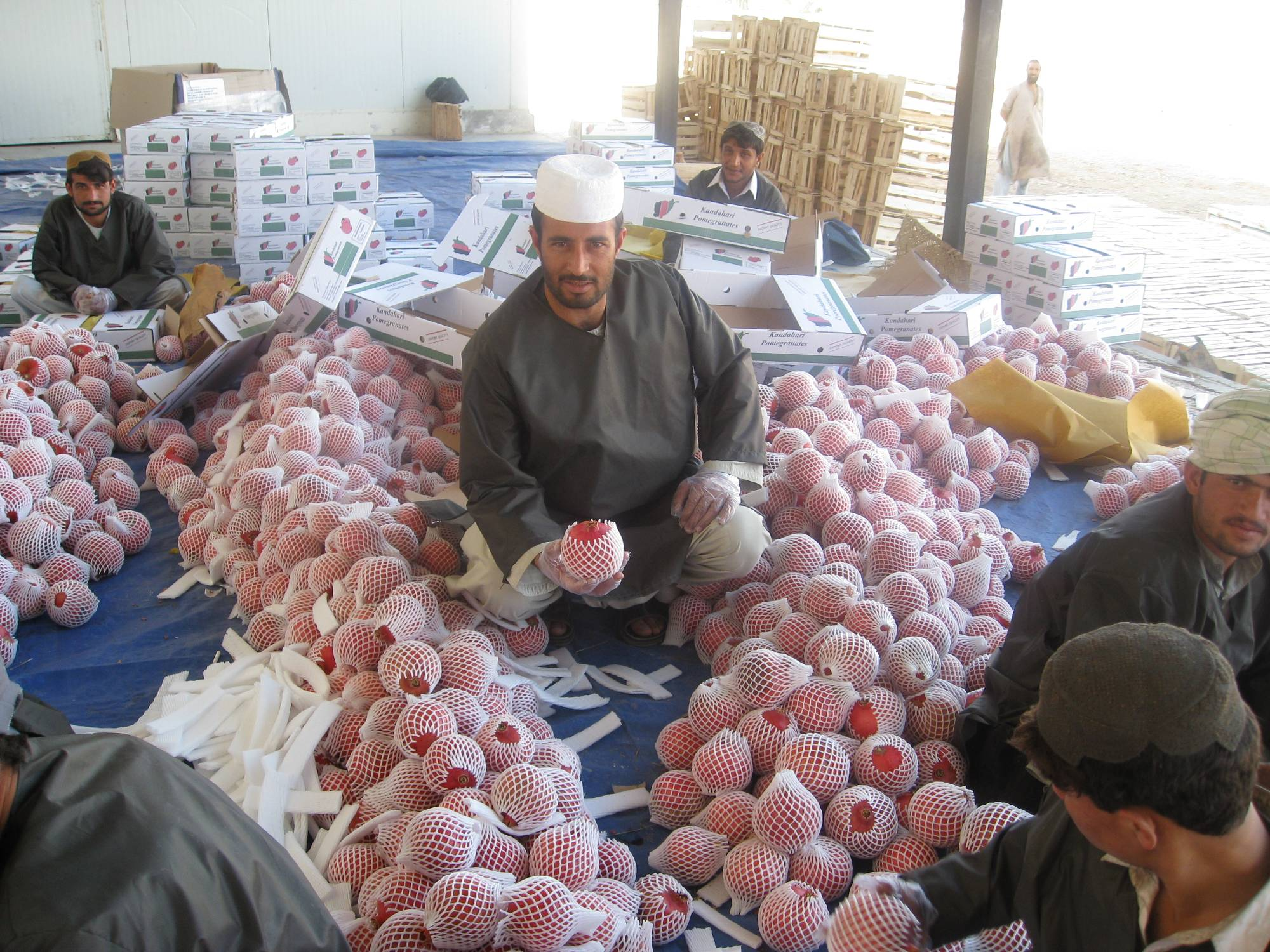
Workers processing pomegranates (anaar), for which Afghanistan is famous in Asia

Afghanistan's nominal GDP was $20.1 billion in 2020, or $81 billion by purchasing power parity (PPP). Its GDP per capita is $2,459 (PPP) and $611 by nominal. Despite having $1 trillion or more in mineral deposits, it remains one of the world's least developed countries. Its economic output per capita is among the lowest of any country as of 2026. Afghanistan's rough physical geography and its landlocked status has been cited as reasons why the country has always been among the least developed in the modern era – a factor where progress is also slowed by contemporary conflict and political instability. The country imports over $7 billion worth of goods but exports only $784 million, mainly fruits and nuts. It has $2.8 billion in external debt. The service sector contributed the most to the GDP (55.9%) followed by agriculture (23%) and industry (21.1%).

Da Afghanistan Bank serves as the central bank of the nation and the Afghani (AFN) is the national currency, with an exchange rate of about 75 Afghanis to 1 US dollar. A number of local and foreign banks operate in the country, including the Afghanistan International Bank, New Kabul Bank, Azizi Bank, Pashtany Bank, Standard Chartered Bank, and the First Micro Finance Bank.

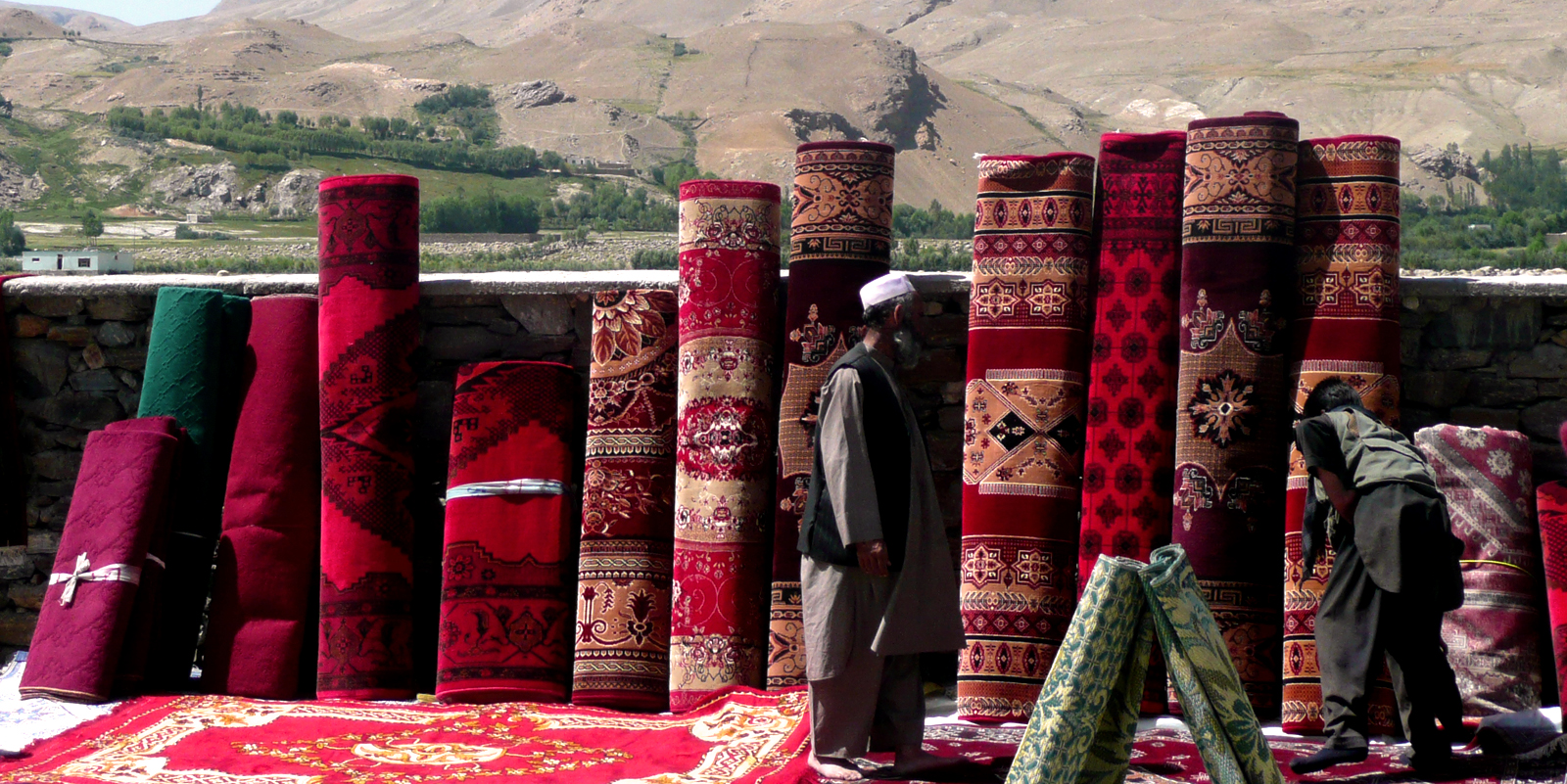
Afghan rugs are one of Afghanistan's main exports.

In 2010, one of the main drivers for the economic recovery was the return of over 5 million expatriates, who brought with them entrepreneurship and wealth-creating skills as well as much needed funds to start up businesses. Many Afghans got involved in construction, which was one of the largest industries in the country at the time. Some of the major national construction projects include the $35 billion New Kabul City next to the capital, the Aino Mena project in Kandahar, and the Ghazi Amanullah Khan Town near Jalalabad. Similar development projects have also begun in Herat, Mazar-e-Sharif, and other cities. An estimated 400,000 people enter the labor market each year.

Several small companies and factories began operating in different parts of the country, which not only provide revenues to the government but also create new jobs. Improvements to the business environment have resulted in more than $1.5 billion in telecom investment and created more than 100,000 jobs since 2003. Afghan rugs are becoming popular again, allowing many carpet dealers around the country to hire more workers; in 2016–17 it was the fourth most exported group of items.

Afghanistan is a member of WTO, SAARC, ECO, and OIC. It holds an observer status in SCO. In 2018, a majority of imports come from either Iran, China, Pakistan and Kazakhstan, while 84% of exports are to Pakistan and India.

Since the Taliban's takeover of the country in August 2021, the United States has frozen about $9 billion in assets belonging to the Afghan central bank, blocking the Taliban from accessing billions of dollars held in US bank accounts.

The GDP of Afghanistan is estimated to have dropped by 20% following the Taliban return to power. Following this, after months of free-fall, the Afghan economy began stabilizing, as a result of the Taliban's restrictions on smuggled imports, limits on banking transactions, and UN aid. In 2023, the Afghan economy began seeing signs of revival. This has also been followed by stable exchange rates, low inflation, stable revenue collection, and the rise of trade in exports. In the third quarter of 2023, the Afghani rose to be the best performing currency in the world, climbing over 9% against the US dollar.

=== Agriculture ===
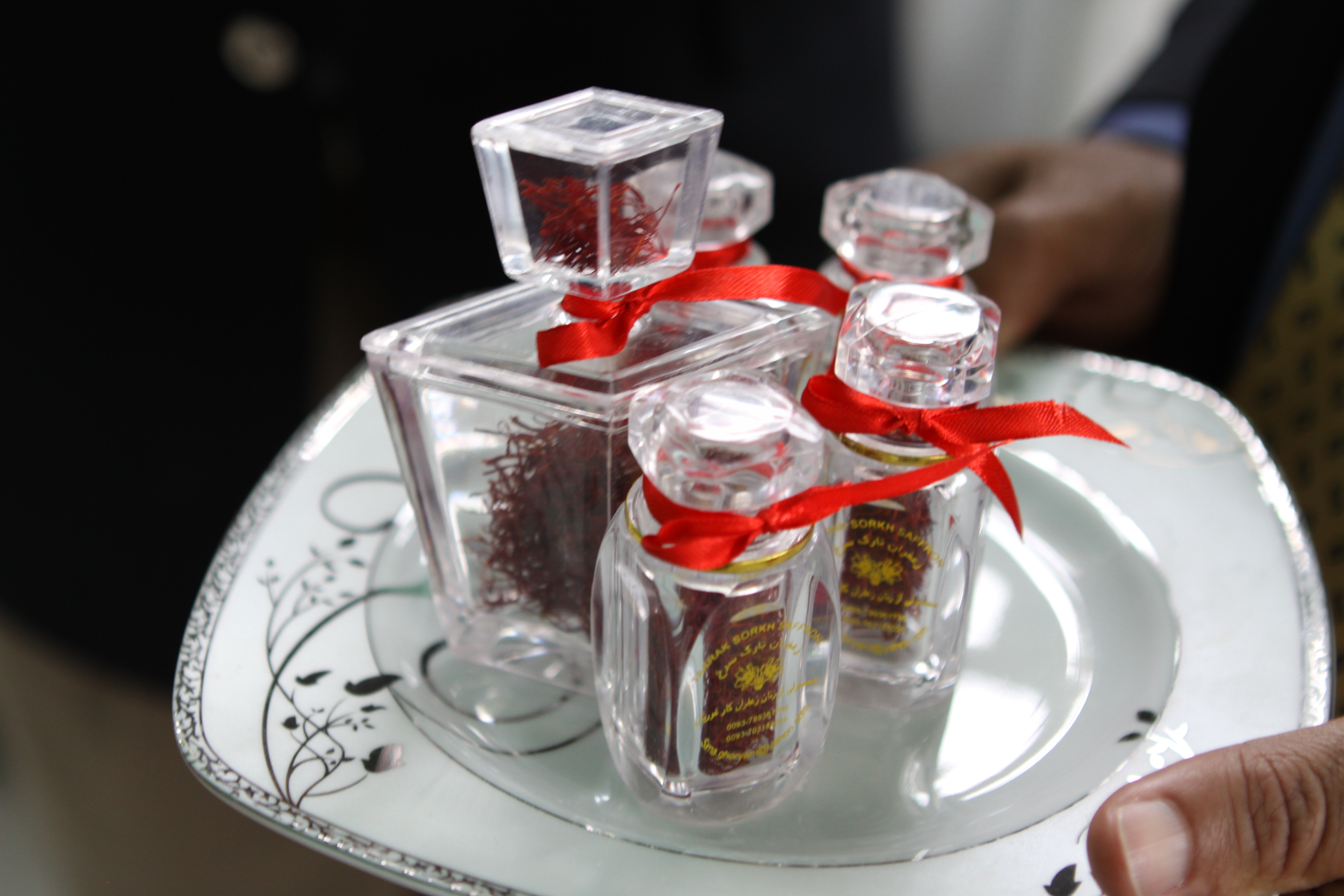
Afghan saffron

Agricultural production is the backbone of Afghanistan's economy and has traditionally dominated the economy, employing about 40% of the workforce as of 2018. The country is known for producing pomegranates, grapes, apricots, melons, and several other fresh and dry fruits. Afghanistan also became the world's top producer of cannabis in 2010. In March 2023, however, cannabis production was banned by a decree from Hibatullah Akhundzada.

Saffron, the most expensive spice, grows in Afghanistan, particularly Herat Province. In recent years, there has been an uptick in saffron production, which authorities and farmers are using to try to replace poppy cultivation. Between 2012 and 2019, the saffron cultivated and produced in Afghanistan was consecutively ranked the world's best by the International Taste and Quality Institute. Production hit record high in 2019 (19,469 kg of saffron), and one kilogram is sold domestically between $634 and $1147.

The availability of cheap diesel-powered water pumps imported from China and Pakistan, and in the 2010s, of cheap solar power to pump water, resulted in expansion of agriculture and population in the southwestern deserts of Afghanistan in Kandahar, Helmand and Nimruz provinces in the 2010s. Wells have gradually been deepened, but water resources are limited. Opium is the major crop, but as of 2022, was under attack by the new Taliban government which, to suppress opium production, was systematically suppressing water pumping. In a 2023 report, poppy cultivation in southern Afghanistan was reduced by over 80% as a result of Taliban campaigns to stop its use toward opium. This included a 99% reduction of opium growth in the Helmand Province. In November 2023, a U.N report showed that in the entirety of Afghanistan, poppy cultivation dropped by over 95%, removing it from its place as being the world's largest opium producer.

=== Mining ===
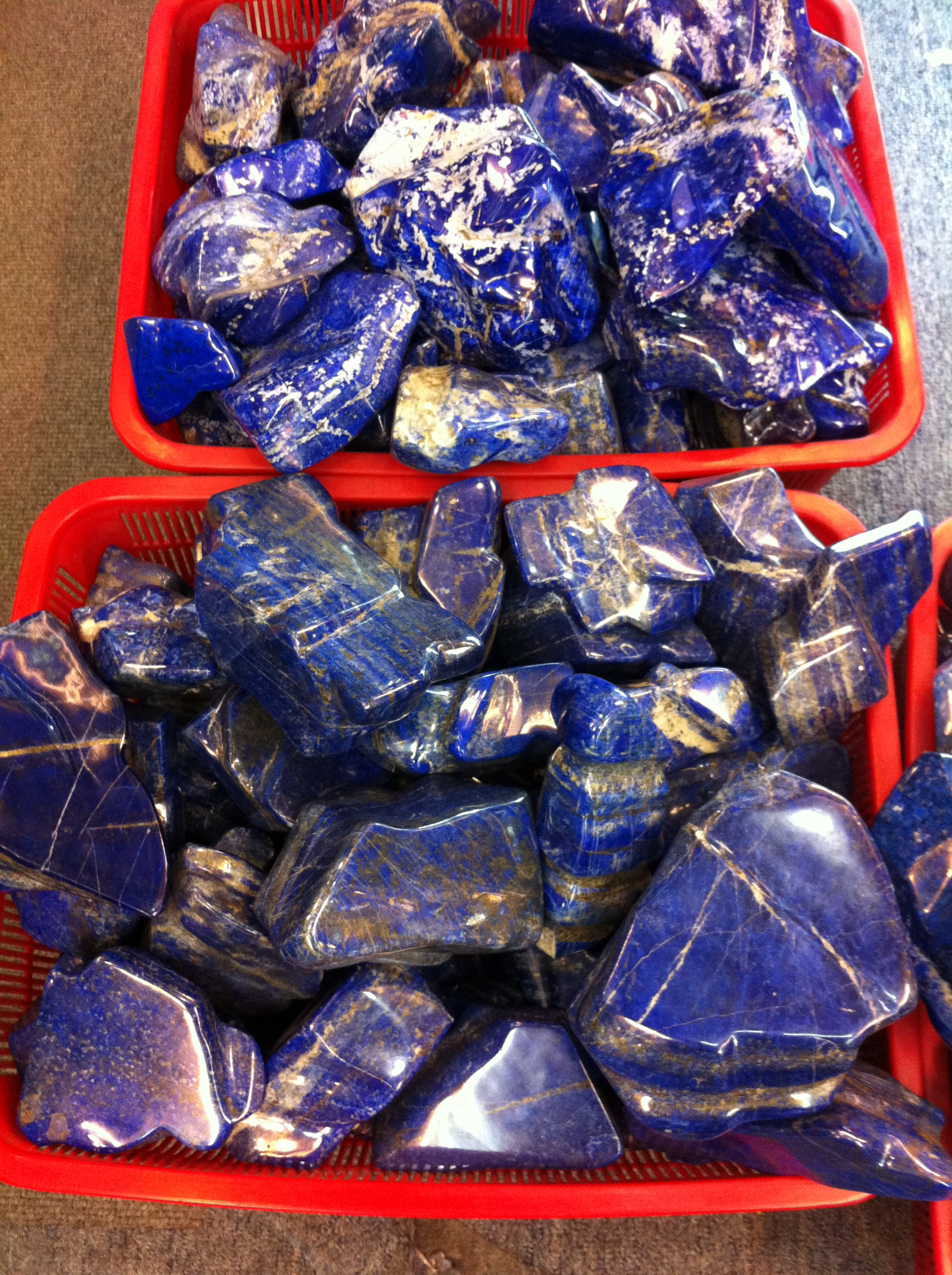
Lapis lazuli stones

The country's natural resources include: coal, copper, iron ore, lithium, uranium, rare earth elements, chromite, gold, zinc, talc, barite, sulfur, lead, marble, precious and semi-precious stones, natural gas, and petroleum. In 2010, US and Afghan government officials estimated that untapped mineral deposits located in 2007 by the US Geological Survey are worth at least $1 trillion.

Michael E. O'Hanlon of the Brookings Institution estimated that if Afghanistan generates about $10 billion per year from its mineral deposits, its gross national product would double and provide long-term funding for critical needs. The United States Geological Survey (USGS) estimated in 2006 that northern Afghanistan has an average 460 million m^{3} (2.9 billion bbl) of crude oil, 440 billion m^{3} (15.7 trillion cu ft) of natural gas, and 67 billion L (562 million US bbl) of natural gas liquids. In 2011, Afghanistan signed an oil exploration contract with China National Petroleum Corporation (CNPC) for the development of three oil fields along the Amu Darya river in the north.

The country has significant amounts of lithium, copper, gold, coal, iron ore, and other minerals. The Khanashin carbonatite in Helmand Province contains 1,000,000 tonnes (980,000 long tons; 1,100,000 short tons) of rare earth elements. In 2007, a 30-year lease was granted for the Aynak copper mine to the China Metallurgical Group for $3 billion, making it the biggest foreign investment and private business venture in Afghanistan's history. The state-run Steel Authority of India won the mining rights to develop the huge Hajigak iron ore deposit in central Afghanistan. Government officials estimate that 30% of the country's untapped mineral deposits are worth at least $1 trillion. One official asserted that "this will become the backbone of the Afghan economy" and a Pentagon memo stated that Afghanistan could become the "Saudi Arabia of lithium". The lithium reserves of 21 Mio. tons could amount to the ones of Bolivia, which is currently viewed as the country with the largest lithium reserves. Other larger deposits are the ones of bauxite and cobalt.

Access to biocapacity in Afghanistan is lower than world average. In 2016, Afghanistan had 0.43 global hectares of biocapacity per person within its territory, much less than the world average of 1.6 global hectares per person. In 2016 Afghanistan used 0.73 global hectares of biocapacity per person—their ecological footprint of consumption. This means they use just under double as much biocapacity as Afghanistan contains. As a result, Afghanistan is running a biocapacity deficit.

In September 2023, the Taliban signed mining contracts worth $6.5 billion, with extractions based on gold, iron, lead, and zinc in the provinces of Herat, Ghor, Logar, and Takhar.

=== Energy ===
Afghanistan electricity supply (1980–2019)

According to the World Bank, 98% of the rural population have access to electricity in 2018, up from 28% in 2008. Overall the figure stands at 98.7%. As of 2016, Afghanistan produces 1,400 megawatts of power, but still imports the majority of electricity via transmission lines from Iran and the Central Asian states. The majority of electricity production is via hydropower, helped by the amount of rivers and streams that flow from the mountains. However electricity is not always reliable and blackouts happen, including in Kabul. In recent years an increasing number of solar, biomass and wind power plants have been constructed. Currently under development are the CASA-1000 project which will transmit electricity from Kyrgyzstan and Tajikistan, and the Turkmenistan-Afghanistan-Pakistan-India (TAPI) gas pipeline. Power is managed by the Da Afghanistan Breshna Sherkat (DABS, Afghanistan Electricity Company).

Important dams include the Kajaki Dam, Dahla Dam, and the Sardeh Band Dam.

=== Tourism ===
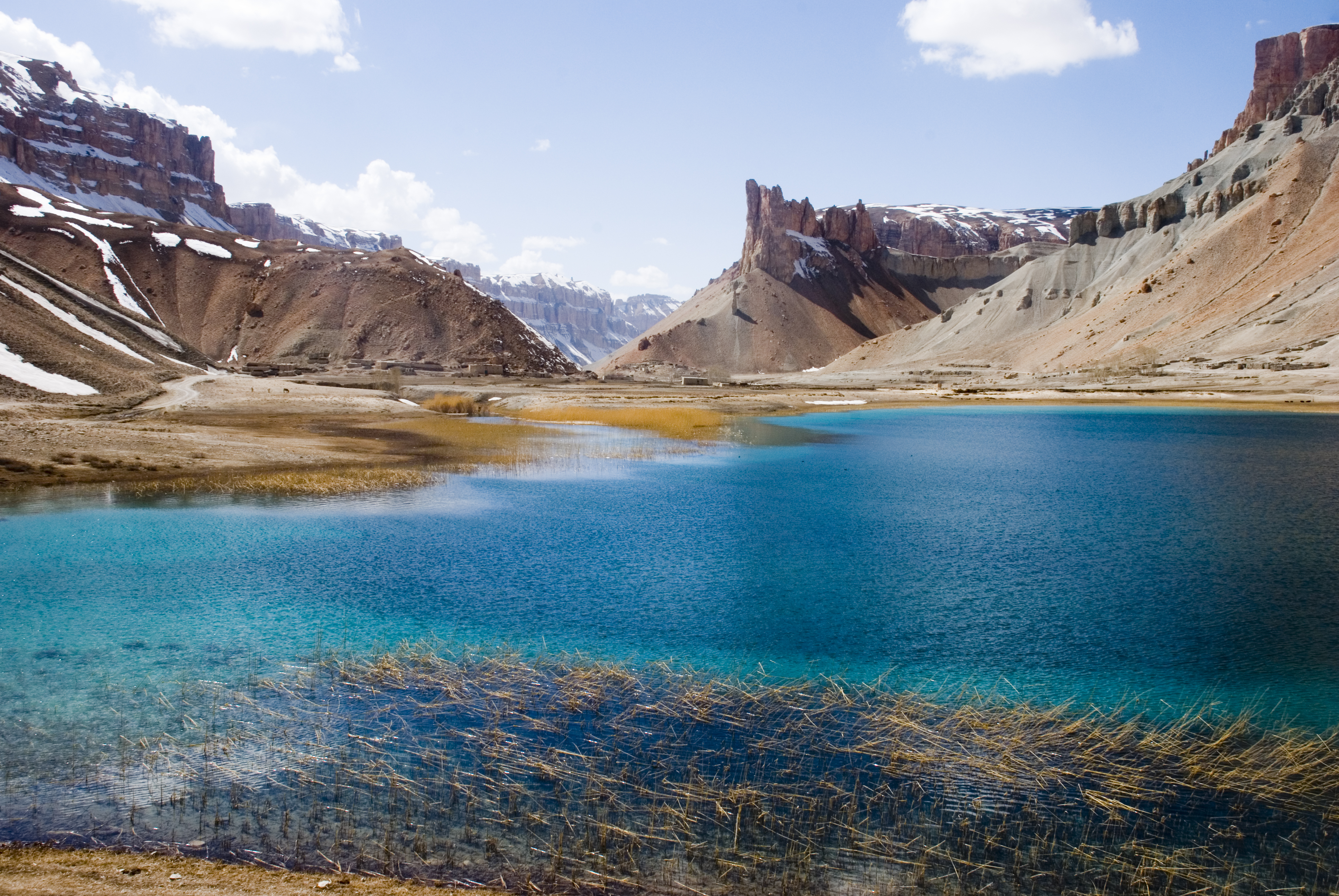
Band-e Amir National Park

Tourism is a small industry in Afghanistan due to security issues. Nevertheless, some 20,000 foreign tourists visit the country annually as of 2016. In particular an important region for domestic and international tourism is the picturesque Bamyan Valley, which includes lakes, canyons and historical sites, helped by the fact it is in a safe area away from insurgent activity. Smaller numbers visit and trek in regions such as the Wakhan Valley, which is also one of the world's most remote communities. From the late 1960s onwards, Afghanistan was a popular stop on the famous hippie trail, attracting many Europeans and Americans. Coming from Iran, the trail traveled through various Afghan provinces and cities including Herat, Kandahar and Kabul before crossing to northern Pakistan, northern India, and Nepal. Tourism peaked in 1977, the year before the start of political instability and armed conflict.

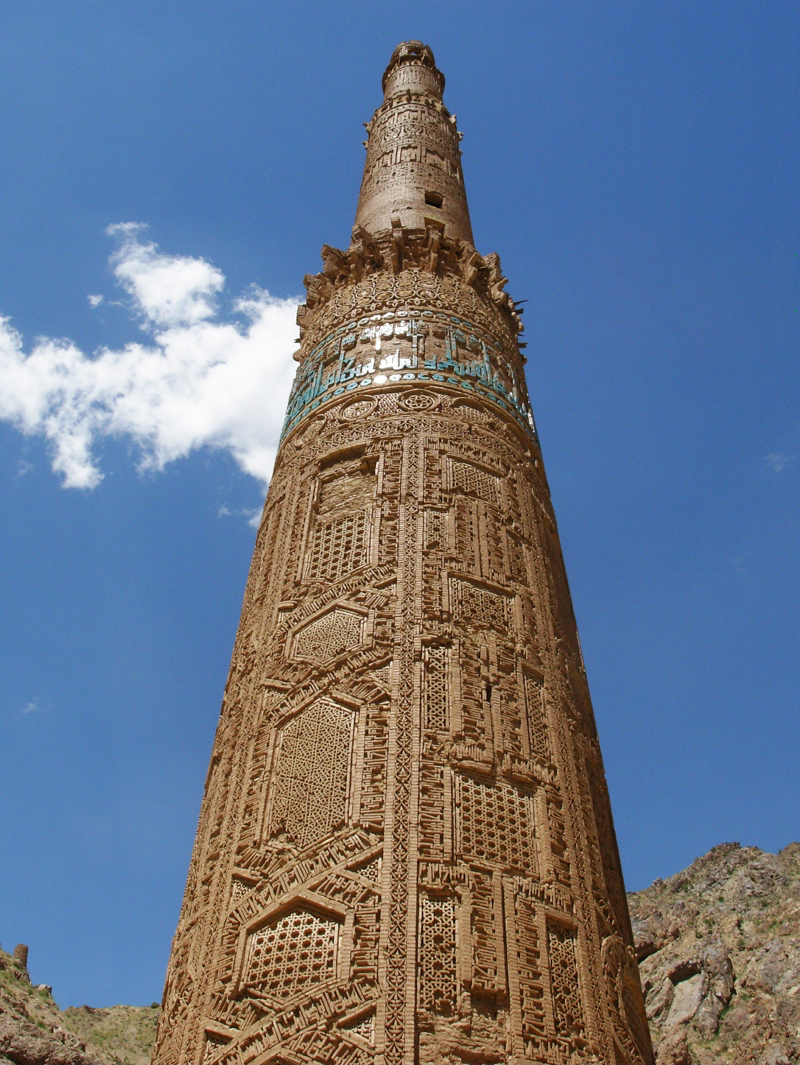
The Minaret of Jam, a UNESCO World Heritage Site

The city of Ghazni has significant history and historical sites, and together with Bamyan city have in recent years been voted Islamic Cultural Capital and South Asia Cultural Capital respectively. The cities of Herat, Kandahar, Balkh, and Zaranj are also very historic. The Minaret of Jam in the Hari River valley is a UNESCO World Heritage Site. A cloak reputedly worn by Islam's prophet Muhammad is kept in the Shrine of the Cloak in Kandahar, a city founded by Alexander the Great and the first capital of Afghanistan. The citadel of Alexander in the western city of Herat has been renovated in recent years and is a popular attraction. In the north of the country is the Shrine of Ali, believed by many to be the location where Ali was buried. The National Museum of Afghanistan in Kabul hosts a large number of Buddhist, Bactrian Greek and early Islamic antiquities; the museum suffered greatly by civil war but has been slowly restoring since the early 2000s.

Unexpectedly, tourism has seen improvement in Afghanistan following the Taliban takeover. Active efforts by the Taliban encouraged tourism to increase from 691 tourists in 2021, to 2,300 in 2022, to 5,200 in 2023, with some estimates of between 7,000 and 10,000. This is, however, threatened by the Islamic State – Khorasan Province, who took responsibility for attacks on tourists, such as the 2024 Bamyan shooting.

=== Communication ===
Telecommunication services in Afghanistan are provided by Afghan Telecom, Afghan Wireless, Etisalat, MTN Group, and Roshan. The country uses its own space satellite called Afghansat 1, which provides services to millions of phone, internet, and television subscribers. By 2001 following years of civil war, telecommunications was virtually a non-existent sector, but by 2016 it had grown to a $2 billion industry, with 22 million mobile phone subscribers and 5 million internet users. The sector employs at least 120,000 people nationwide.

=== Transportation ===
The Salang Tunnel

Due to Afghanistan's geography, transport between various parts of the country has historically been difficult. The backbone of Afghanistan's road network is Highway 1, often called the "Ring Road", which extends for 2,210 kilometres (1,370 mi) and connects five major cities: Kabul, Ghazni, Kandahar, Herat and Mazar-i-Sharif, with spurs to Kunduz and Jalalabad and various border crossings, while skirting around the mountains of the Hindu Kush.

The Ring Road is crucially important for domestic and international trade and the economy. A key portion of the Ring Road is the Salang Tunnel, completed in 1964, which facilitates travel through the Hindu Kush mountain range and connects northern and southern Afghanistan. It is the only land route that connects Central Asia to the Indian subcontinent. Several mountain passes allow travel between the Hindu Kush in other areas. Serious traffic accidents are common on Afghan roads and highways, particularly on the Kabul–Kandahar and the Kabul–Jalalabad Road. Traveling by bus in Afghanistan remains dangerous due to militant activities.

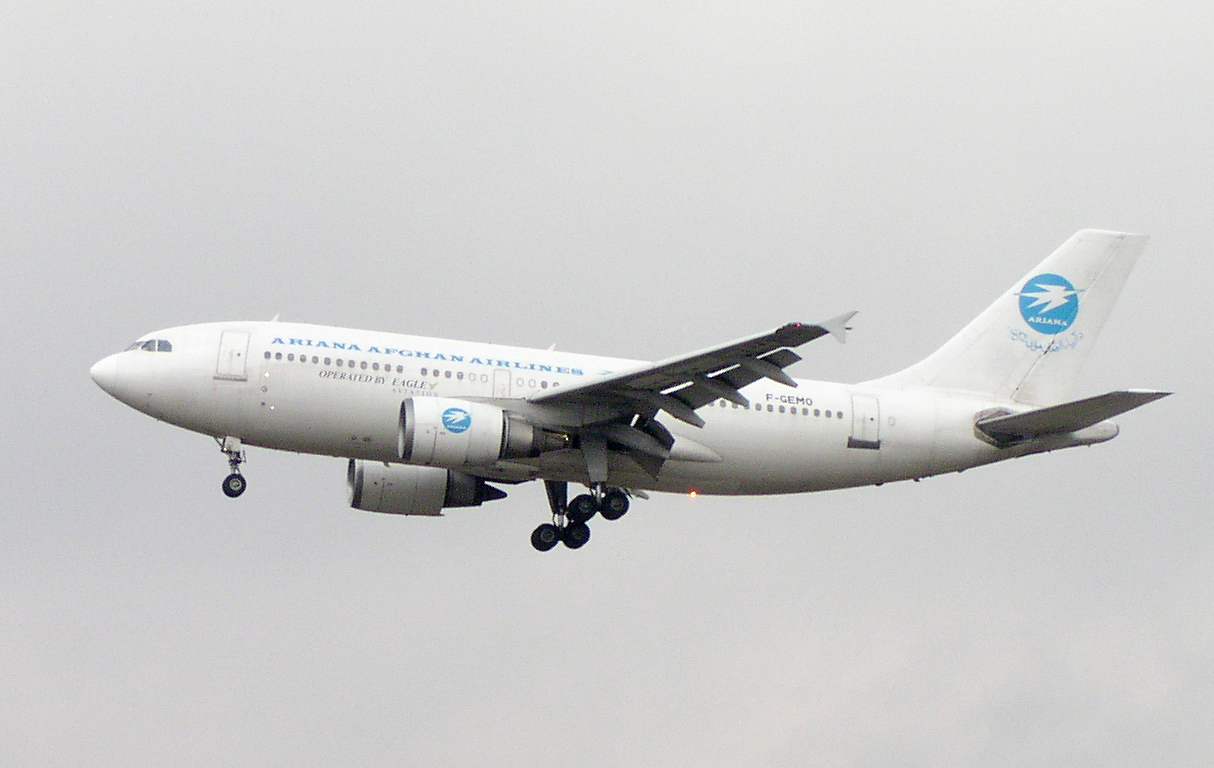
An Ariana Afghan Airlines Airbus A310 in 2006

Air transport in Afghanistan is provided by the national carrier, Ariana Afghan Airlines, and by the private company Kam Air. Airlines from a number of countries also provide flights in and out of the country. These include Air India, Emirates, Gulf Air, Iran Aseman Airlines, Pakistan International Airlines, and Turkish Airlines. The country has four international airports: Kabul International Airport (formerly Hamid Karzai International Airport), Kandahar International Airport, Herat International Airport, and Mazar-e Sharif International Airport. Including domestic airports, there are 43. Bagram Air Base is a major military airfield.

The country has three rail links: one, a 75-kilometre (47 mi) line from Mazar-i-Sharif to the Uzbekistan border; a 10-kilometre (6.2 mi) long line from Toraghundi to the Turkmenistan border (where it continues as part of Turkmen Railways); and a short link from Aqina across the Turkmen border to Kerki, which is planned to be extended further across Afghanistan. These lines are used for freight only and there is no passenger service. A rail line between Khaf, Iran and Herat, western Afghanistan, intended for both freight and passengers, was under construction as of 2019. About 125 kilometres (78 mi) of the line will lie on the Afghan side.

Private vehicle ownership has increased substantially since the early 2000s. Taxis are yellow and consist of both cars and auto rickshaws. In rural Afghanistan, villagers often use donkeys, mules or horses to transport or carry goods. Camels are primarily used by the Kochi nomads. Bicycles are popular throughout Afghanistan.

== Demographics ==
Emigrants from Afghanistan

A Cold War-era CIA map showing traditional Afghan tribal territories. Pashtun tribes form the world's largest tribal society.

=== Population ===
The population of Afghanistan was estimated at 35.7 million as of 2024 by the Afghanistan National Statistics and Information Authority, whereas the UN estimates over 42.0 million. In 1979 the total population was reported to be about 15.5 million. About 25.3% are urbanite, 70.4% live in rural areas, and the remaining 4.3% are nomadic. An additional 3 million or so Afghans are temporarily housed in neighboring Pakistan and Iran, most of whom were born and raised in those two countries. As of 2013, Afghanistan was the largest refugee-producing country in the world, a title held for 32 years.

The current population growth rate is 2.37%, one of the highest in the world outside of Africa. This population is expected to reach 82 million by 2050 if current population trends continue. The population of Afghanistan increased steadily until the 1980s, when civil war caused millions to flee to other countries such as Pakistan. Millions have since returned and the war conditions contribute to the country having the highest fertility rate outside Africa. Afghanistan's healthcare has recovered since the turn of the century, causing falls in infant mortality and increases in life expectancy, although it has the lowest life expectance of any country outside Africa. This (along with other factors such as returning refugees) caused rapid population growth in the 2000s that has only recently started to slow down. The Gini coefficient in 2008 was 27.8.

==== Fertility rate ====
Afghanistan 2024 total fertility rate has been estimated at 4.4. In 2022 it was 4.5, about twice the world average rate. The rate has fallen since the early 1980s.

=== Urbanization ===
As estimated by the CIA World Factbook, 26% of the population was urbanized as of 2020. This is one of the lowest figures in the world; in Asia it is only higher than Cambodia, Nepal and Sri Lanka. Urbanization has increased rapidly, particularly in the capital Kabul, due to returning refugees from Pakistan and Iran after 2001, internally displaced people, and rural migrants. Urbanization in Afghanistan is different from typical urbanization in that it is centered on just a few cities.

Kabul is the largest city, with a population of 5 million. The other large cities are located generally in the "ring" around the Central Highlands, namely Kandahar in the south, Herat in the west, Mazar-i-Sharif, Kunduz in the north, and Jalalabad in the east.

Largest cities or towns in Afghanistan 2025 estimate by the National Statistics and Information Authority
Rank	Name	Province	Pop.
1	Kabul	Kabul Province	5,333,284
2	Kandahar	Kandahar Province	732,629
3	Herat	Herat Province	673,273
4	Mazar-i-Sharif	Balkh Province	568,013
5	Kunduz	Kunduz Province	413,996
6	Jalalabad	Nangarhar Province	318,733
7	Taloqan	Takhar Province	284,990
8	Puli Khumri	Baghlan Province	230,112
9	Charikar	Parwan Province	222,751
10	Sheberghan	Jowzjan Province	213,411

=== Ethnicity and languages ===
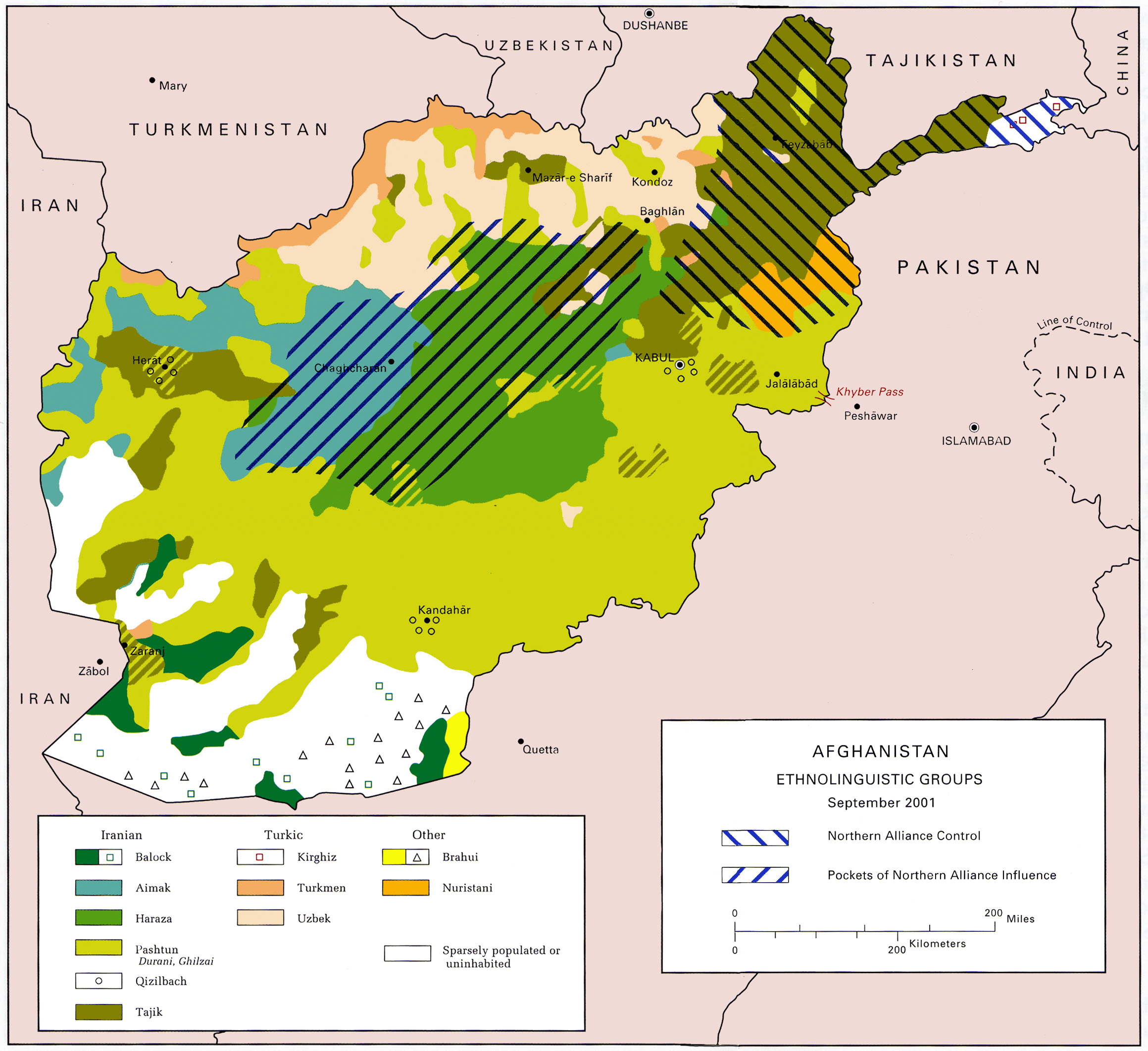
Ethnolinguistic map of Afghanistan (2001)

Afghans are divided into several ethnolinguistic groups. The last ethnic census in Afghanistan was conducted in 1979, and was itself incomplete. Due to the ongoing conflict in the country, no official census has been conducted since. The Pashtuns are the largest ethnic group, forming between 37–42% of the total population, They are followed by Tajiks who comprise about 27%. The other two major ethnic groups are the Hazaras and Uzbeks, each at 9%. A further 10 other ethnic groups are recognized and each are represented in the Afghan National Anthem.

Pashto and Dari are the official languages of Afghanistan; bilingualism is very common. Dari, which is also referred to as Eastern Persian as it is a variety of and mutually intelligible with Persian (often called 'Farsi' by some Afghans; the native name of Persian in Iran), functions as the lingua franca in Kabul as well as in much of the northern and northwestern parts of the country. Native speakers of Dari, of any ethnicity, are sometimes called Farsiwans. Pashto is the native tongue of the Pashtuns and is spoken throughout the capital and the southern and eastern regions of the country, being the lingua franca amongst each other. Many Pashtuns are also fluent in Dari, while some non-Pashtuns are also fluent in Pashto. Despite the Pashtuns having been dominant in Afghan politics for centuries, Dari remained the preferred language for government and bureaucracy. According to CIA World Factbook, Dari Persian is spoken by 78% (L1 + L2) and functions as the country's lingua franca, while Pashto is spoken by 50%, Uzbek 10%, English 5%, Turkmen 2%, Urdu 2%, Pashayi 1%, Nuristani 1%, Arabic 1%, and Balochi 1% (2021 est). Data represent the most widely spoken languages; shares sum to more than 100% because there is much bilingualism in the country and because respondents were allowed to select more than one language. There are a number of smaller regional languages, including Uzbek, Turkmen, Balochi, Pashayi, and Nuristani.

When it comes to foreign languages among the populace, many are able to speak or understand Hindustani (Urdu-Hindi), partly due to returning Afghan refugees from Pakistan and the popularity of Bollywood films respectively. English is also understood by some of the population, and has been gaining popularity as of the 2000s. Some Afghans retain some ability in Russian, which was taught in public schools during the 1980s.

=== Religion ===
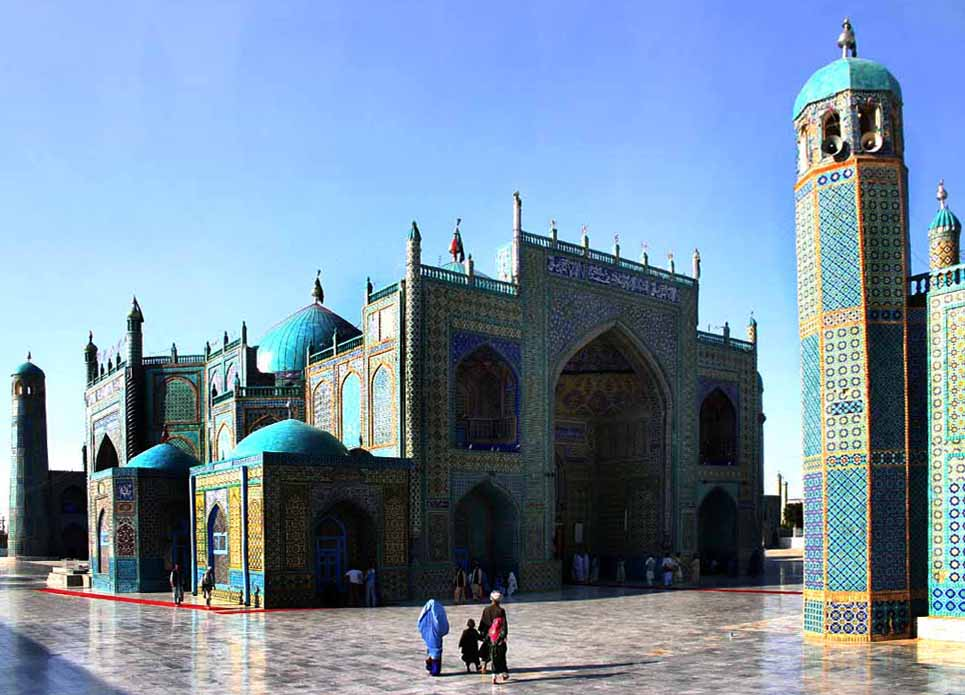
Blue Mosque in Mazar-i-Sharif is the largest mosque in Afghanistan.

The CIA estimated in 2009 that 99.7% of the Afghan population was Muslim and most are thought to adhere to the Sunni Hanafi school. According to Pew Research Center, as much as 90% are of the Sunni denomination, 7% Shia and 3% non-denominational. Conversion away from Islam is persecuted, limiting religious freedom.

Afghan Sikhs and Hindus are also found in certain major cities (namely Kabul, Jalalabad, Ghazni, Kandahar) accompanied by gurdwaras and mandirs. According to Deutsche Welle in September 2021, 250 remain in the country after 67 were evacuated to India.

There was a small Jewish community in Afghanistan, living mainly in Herat and Kabul. Over the years, this small community was forced to leave due to decades of warfare and religious persecution. By the end of the twentieth century, nearly the entire community had emigrated to Israel and the United States, with one known exception, Herat-born Zablon Simintov. He remained for years, being the caretaker of the only remaining Afghan synagogue. He left the country for the US after the second Taliban takeover. A woman who left shortly after him has since been identified as the likely last Jew in Afghanistan.

Afghan Christians, who number 500–8,000, practice their faith secretly due to intense societal opposition, and there are no public churches.

=== Education ===
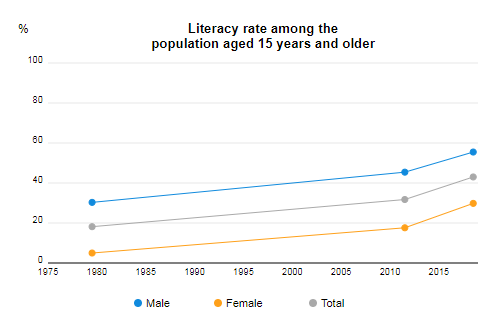
UNESCO Institute of Statistics Afghanistan Literacy Rate among population aged 15+ (1980–2018)

Education in Afghanistan is overseen by the Ministry of Education and the Ministry of Higher Education. There are over 16,000 schools in the country and roughly 9 million students. Of this, about 60% are males and 40% females. However, the new regime has thus far forbidden female teachers and female students from returning to secondary schools. Over 174,000 students are enrolled in different universities around the country. About 21% of these are females. Former Education Minister Ghulam Farooq Wardak had stated that construction of 8,000 schools is required for the remaining children who are deprived of formal learning. As of 2018 the literacy rate of the population age 15 and older is 43.02% (males 55.48% and females 29.81%).

The top universities in Afghanistan are the American University of Afghanistan (AUAF) followed by Kabul University (KU), both of which are located in Kabul. The National Military Academy of Afghanistan, modeled after the United States Military Academy at West Point, was a four-year military development institution dedicated to graduating officers for the Afghan Armed Forces. The Afghan Defense University was constructed near Qargha in Kabul. Major universities outside of Kabul include Kandahar University in the south, Herat University in the northwest, Balkh University and Kunduz University in the north, Nangarhar University and Khost University in the east.

After the Taliban regained power in 2021, it became unclear to what extent female education would continue in the country. In March 2022, after they had been closed for some time, it was announced that secondary education would be reopened shortly. However, shortly before reopening, the order was rescinded and schools for older girls remained closed. Despite the ban, six provinces, Balkh, Kunduz, Jowzjan, Sar-I-Pul, Faryab, and the Day Kundi, still allow girls' schools from grade 6 and up. In December 2023, investigations were being held by the United Nations on the claim that Afghan girls of all ages were allowed to study at religious schools. As of November 2024, some parts of the country allow women to attend religious schools to pursue dentistry, nursing, and other subjects.

=== Health ===
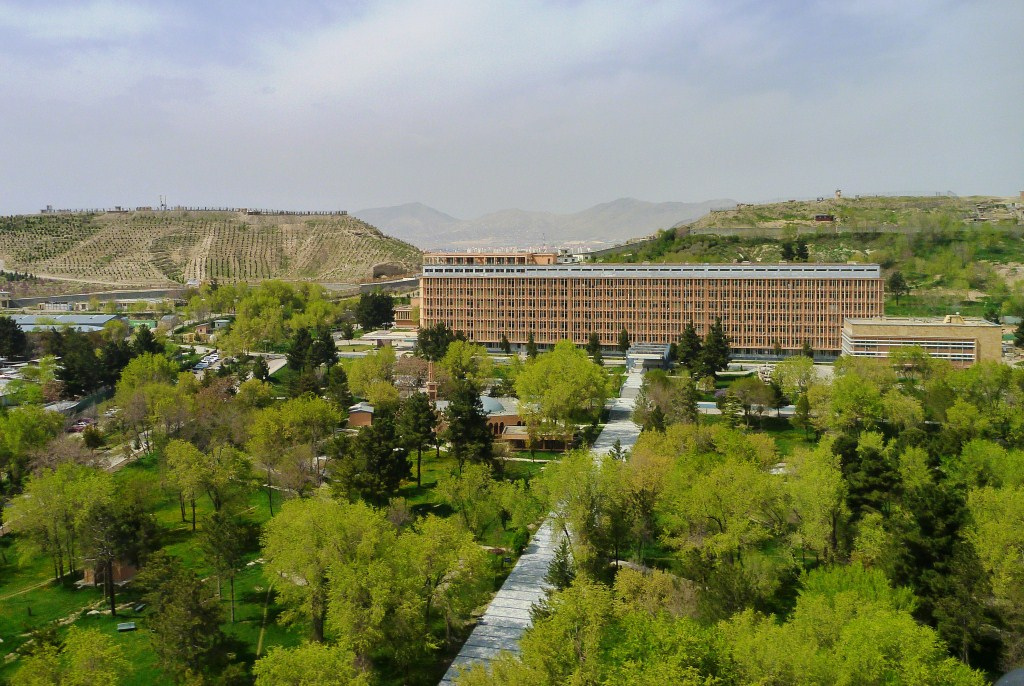
The Daoud Khan Military Hospital in Kabul is one of the largest hospitals in Afghanistan.

According to the Human Development Index, Afghanistan is the 15th least developed country in the world. The average life expectancy is estimated to be around 60 years. The country's maternal mortality rate is 396 deaths/100,000 live births and its infant mortality rate is 66 to 112.8 deaths in every 1,000 live births. The Ministry of Public Health plans to cut the infant mortality rate to 400 for every 100,000 live births before 2020. The country has more than 3,000 midwives, with an additional 300 to 400 being trained each year.

There are over 100 hospitals in Afghanistan, with the most advanced treatments being available in Kabul. The French Medical Institute for Children and Indira Gandhi Children's Hospital in Kabul are the leading children's hospitals in the country. Some of the other leading hospitals in Kabul include the Jamhuriat Hospital and Jinnah Hospital. In spite of all this, many Afghans travel to Pakistan and India for advanced treatment.

It was reported in 2006 that nearly 60% of the Afghan population lives within a two-hour walk of the nearest health facility. The disability rate is also high in Afghanistan due to the decades of war. It was reported recently that about 80,000 people are missing limbs. Non-governmental charities such as Save the Children and Mahboba's Promise assist orphans in association with governmental structures.

== Culture ==
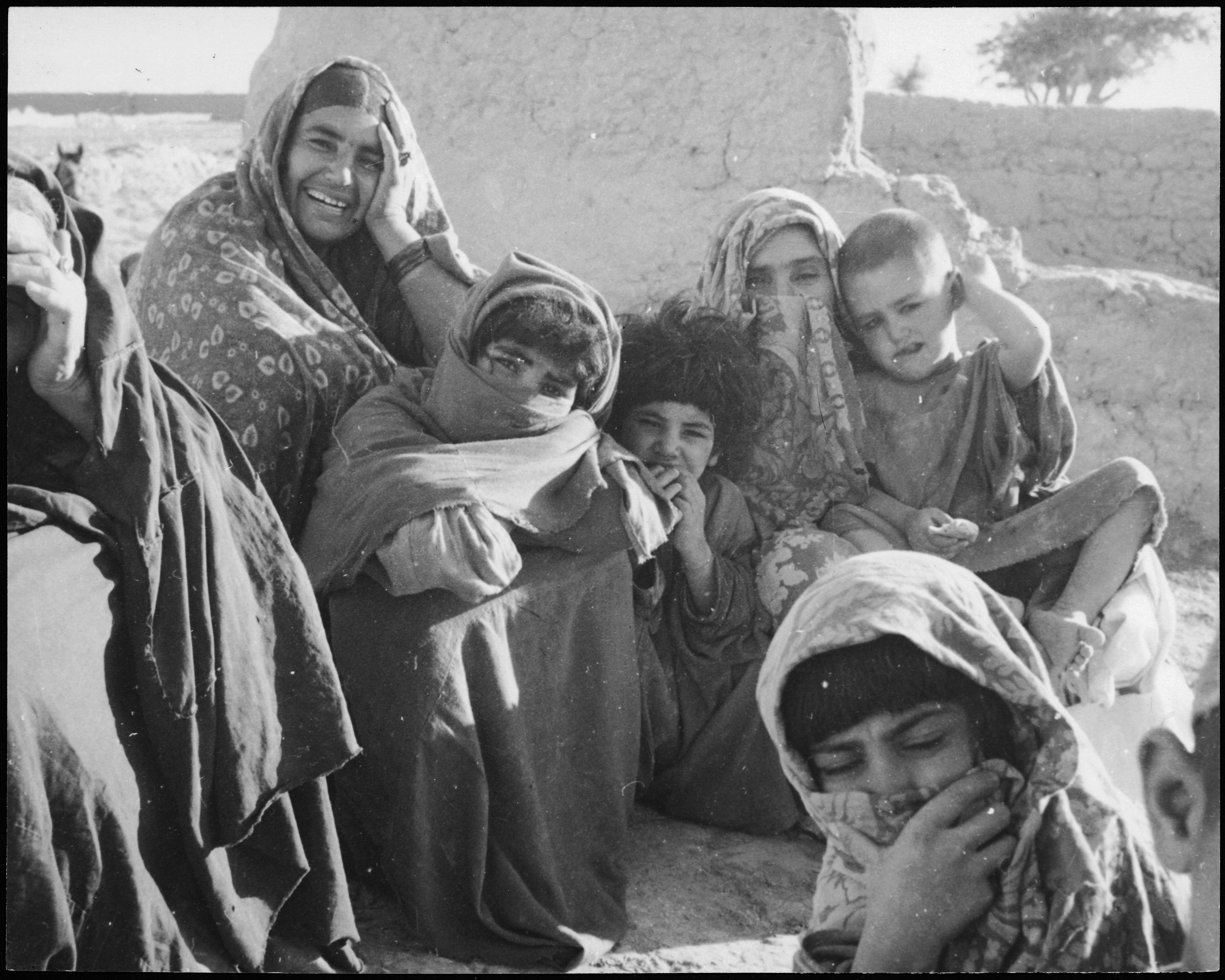
An Afghan family near Kholm, 1939 – most Afghans are tribal.

Afghans have both common cultural features and those that differ between the regions of Afghanistan, each with distinctive cultures partly as a result of geographic obstacles that divide the country. Family is the mainstay of Afghan society and families are often headed by a patriarch. In the southern and eastern region, the people live according to the Pashtun culture by following Pashtunwali traditions. Key tenets of Pashtunwali include hospitality, the provision of sanctuary to those seeking refuge, and revenge for the shedding of blood. The Pashtuns are largely connected to the culture of Central Asia and the Iranian Plateau. The remaining Afghans are culturally Persian and Turkic. Tajiks and Hazaras, are culturally Persian while the Uzbeks of Afghanistan follow Turkic traditions. Some non-Pashtuns who live in proximity with Pashtuns have adopted Pashtunwali in a process called Pashtunization, while some Pashtuns have been Persianized. Those who have lived in Pakistan and Iran over the last 30 years have been further influenced by the cultures of those neighboring nations. The people of Afghanistan are known to be strongly religious.

The Afghans, particularly Pashtuns, are noted for their tribal solidarity and high regard for personal honor. There are various Afghan tribes, and an estimated 2–3 million nomads. Afghan culture is deeply Islamic, but pre-Islamic practices persist. Child marriage is prevalent; in 2017, Human Rights Watch described the legal age for marriage of girls as being 16, or 15 with the consent of the father or a judge. The most preferred marriage in Afghan society is to one's parallel cousin, and the groom is often expected to pay a bride price.

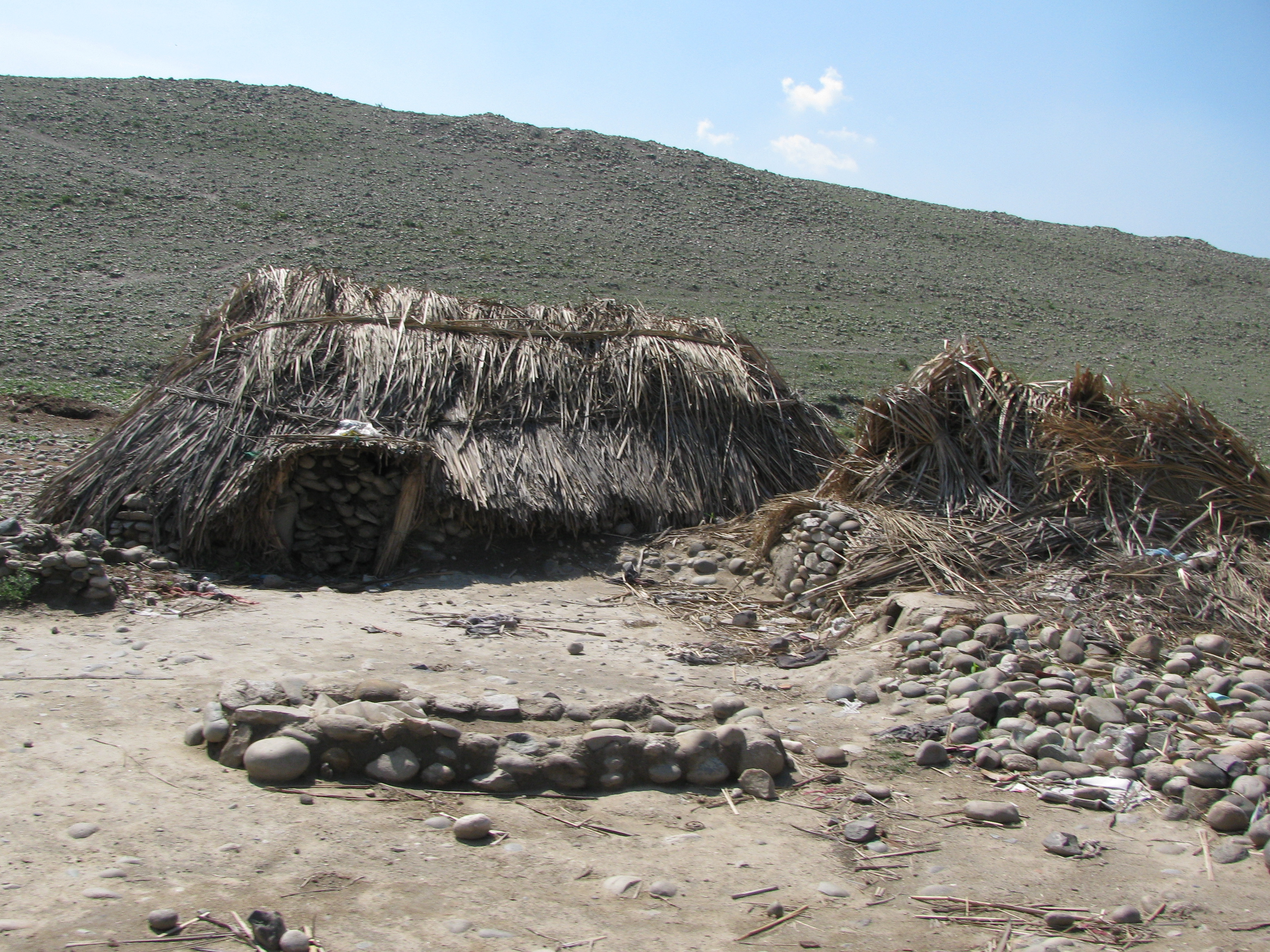
A house occupied by nomadic kochi people in Nangarhar Province

In the villages, families typically occupy mudbrick houses, or compounds with mudbrick or stone walled houses. Villages typically have a headman (malik), a master for water distribution (mirab) and a religious teacher (mullah). Men would typically work on the fields, joined by women during harvest. About 15% of the population are nomadic, locally called kochis. When nomads pass villages they often buy supplies such as tea, wheat and kerosene from the villagers; villagers buy wool and milk from the nomads.

Afghan clothing for both men and women typically consists of various forms of shalwar kameez, especially perahan tunban and khet partug. Women would normally wear a chador for head covering; some women, typically from highly conservative communities, wear the burqa, a full body covering. These were worn by some women of the Pashtun community well before Islam came to the region, but the Taliban enforced this dress on women when they were in power. Another popular dress is the chapan which acts as a coat. The karakul is a hat made from the fur of a specific regional breed of sheep. It was favored by former kings of Afghanistan and became known to much of the world in the 21st century when it was constantly worn by President Hamid Karzai. The pakol is another traditional hat originating from the far east of the country; it was popularly worn by the guerrilla leader Ahmad Shah Massoud. The Mazari hat originates from northern Afghanistan.

=== Architecture ===
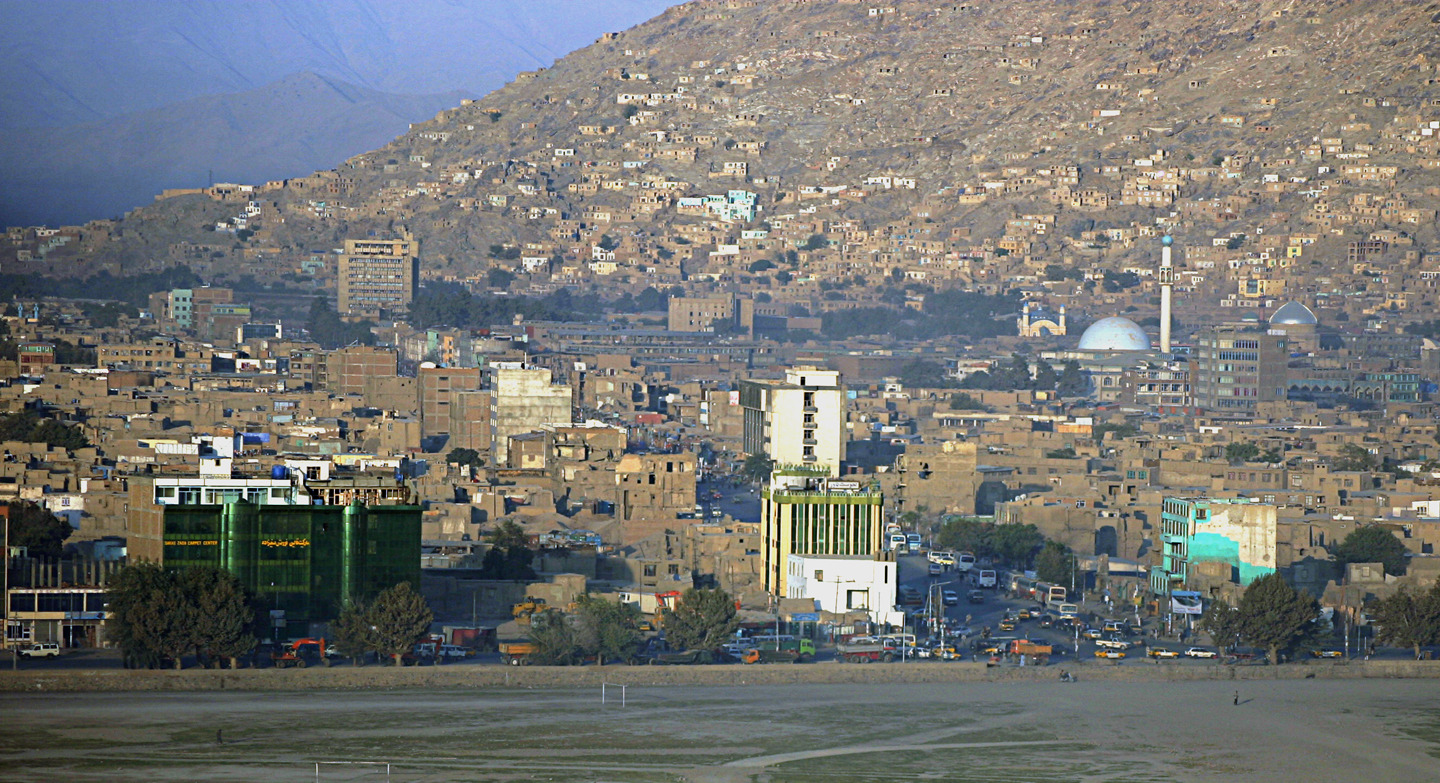
Kabul skyline, displaying both historical and contemporary buildings

The nation has a complex history that has survived either in its current cultures or in the form of various languages and monuments. Afghanistan contains many remnants from all ages, including Greek and Buddhist stupas, monasteries, monuments, temples, and Islamic minarets. Among the most well known are the Great Mosque of Herat, the Blue Mosque, the Minaret of Jam, the Chil Zena, the Qala-i Bost in Lashkargah, the ancient Greek city of Ai-Khanoum. However, many of its historic monuments have been damaged in modern times due to the civil wars. The two famous Buddhas of Bamiyan were destroyed by the Taliban, who regarded them as idolatrous. As there was no colonialism in the modern era in Afghanistan, European-style architecture is rare but does exist: the Victory Arch at Paghman and the Darul Aman Palace in Kabul were built in this style in the 1920s. Afghan architecture also ranges deep into India such as the city of Agra, and the tomb of Sher Shah Suri, an Afghan Emperor of India.

=== Art and ceramics ===
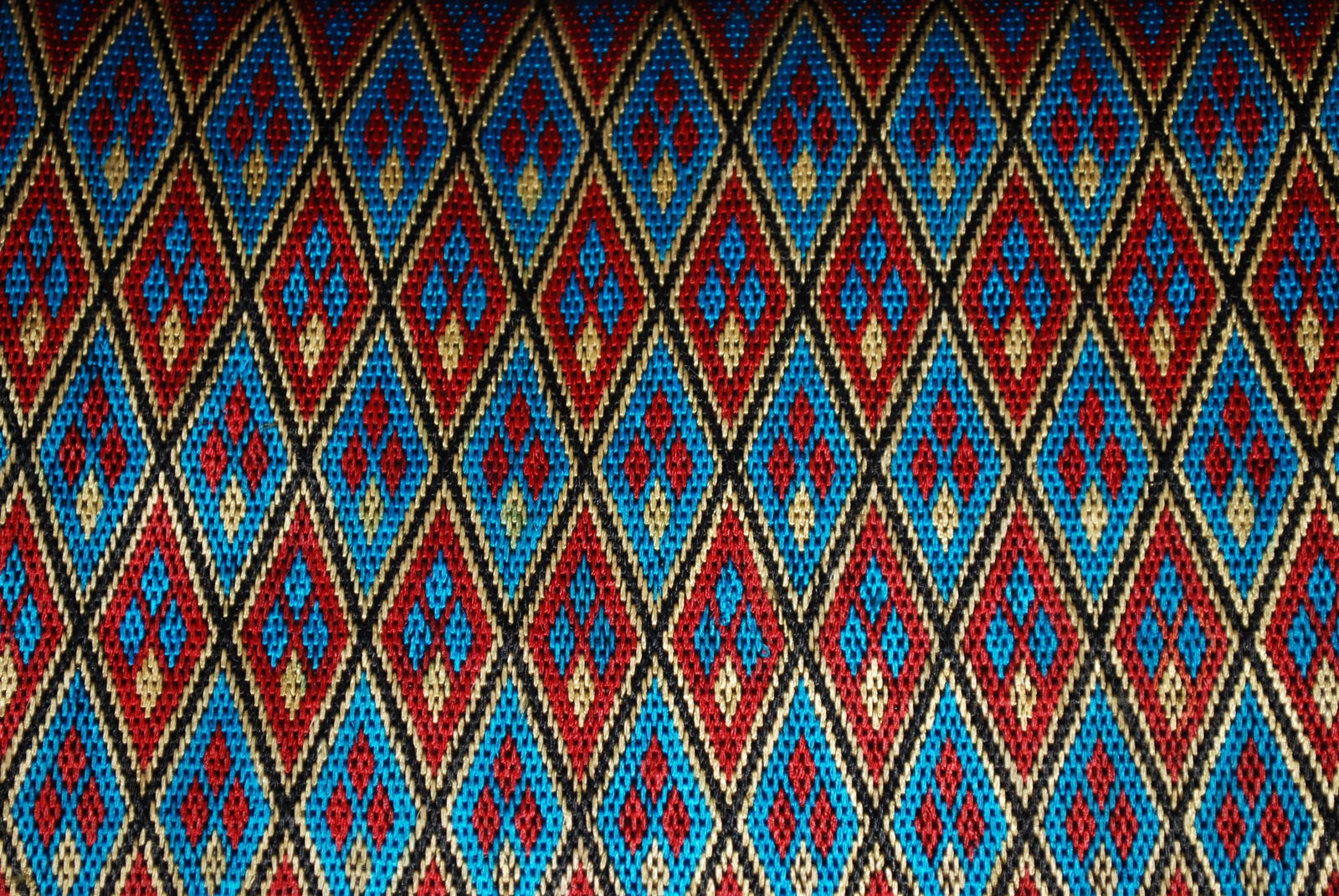
A traditional Afghan embroidery pattern

Carpet weaving is an ancient practice in Afghanistan, and many of these are still handmade by tribal and nomadic people today. Carpets have been produced in the region for thousands of years and traditionally done by women. Some crafters express their feelings through the designs of rugs; for example after the outbreak of the Soviet–Afghan War, "war rugs", a variant of Afghan rugs, were created with designs representing pain and misery caused by the conflict. Every province has its own specific characteristics in making rugs. In some of the Turkic-populated areas in the north-west, bride and wedding ceremony prices are driven by the bride's weaving skills.

Pottery has been crafted in Afghanistan for millennia. The village of Istalif, north of Kabul, is in particular a major center, known for its unique turquoise and green pottery, and their methods of crafting have remained the same for centuries. Much of lapis lazuli stones were earthed in modern-day Afghanistan which were used in Chinese porcelain as cobalt blue, later used in ancient Mesopotamia and Turkey.

The lands of Afghanistan have a long history of art, with the world's earliest known usage of oil painting found in cave murals in the country. A notable art style that developed in Afghanistan and eastern Pakistan is Gandhara Art, produced by a fusion of Greco-Roman art and Buddhist art between the 1st and 7th centuries CE. Later eras saw increased use of the Persian miniature style, with Kamaleddin Behzad of Herat being one of the most notable miniature artists of the Timurid and early Safavid periods. Since the 1900s, the nation began to use Western techniques in art. Abdul Ghafoor Breshna was a prominent Afghan painter and sketch artist from Kabul during the 20th century.

=== Literature ===
Classic Persian and Pashto poetry are a cherished part of Afghan culture. Poetry has always been one of the major educational pillars in the region, to the level that it has integrated itself into culture. One of the poetic styles is called landay. A popular theme in Afghan folklore and mythology are Divs, monstrous creatures. Thursdays are traditionally "poetry night" in the city of Herat when men, women and children gather and recite both ancient and modern poems.

Three mystical authors are considered true national glories (although claimed with equal ardor by Iran), namely: Khwaja Abdullah Ansari of Herat, a great mystic and Sufi saint in the 11th century, Sanai of Ghazni, author of mystical poems in the 12th century, and, finally, Rumi of Balkh, in the 13th century, considered the greatest mystical poet of the Muslim world. The Afghan Pashto literature, although quantitatively remarkable and in great growth in the last century, has always had an essentially local meaning and importance, feeling the influence of both Persian literature and the contiguous literatures of India. Both main literatures, from the second half of the nineteenth century, have shown themselves to be sensitive to genres, movements and stylistic features imported from Europe.

Khushal Khan Khattak of the 17th century is considered the national poet. Other notable poets include Rabi'a Balkhi, Jami, Rahman Baba, Khalilullah Khalili, and Parween Pazhwak.

=== Music ===
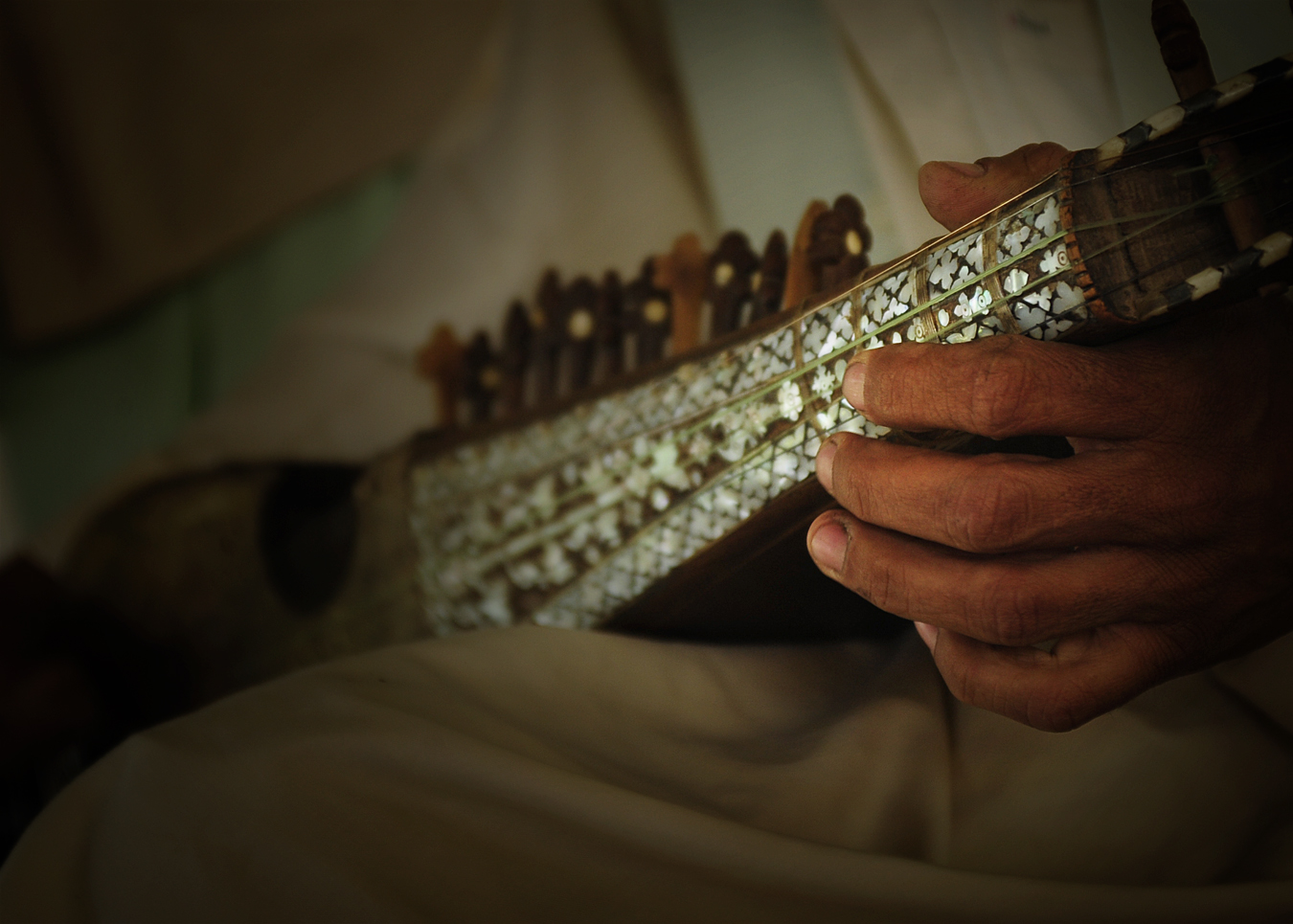
The Afghan rubab

Afghan classical music has close historical links with Indian classical music and use the same Hindustani terminology and theories like raga. Genres of this style of music include ghazal (poetic music) and instruments such as the Indian tabla, sitar and harmonium, and local instruments like zerbaghali, as well as dayereh and tanbur which are also known in Central Asia, the Caucasus and the Middle East. The rubab is the country's national instrument and precurses the Indian sarod instrument. Some of the famous artists of classical music include Ustad Sarahang and Sarban.

Pop music developed in the 1950s through Radio Kabul and was influential in social change. During this time female artists also started appearing, at first Mermon Parwin. Perhaps the most famous artist of this genre was Ahmad Zahir, who synthesized many genres and continues to be renowned for his voice and rich lyrics long after his death in 1979. Other notable masters of traditional or popular Afghan music include Nashenas, Ubaidullah Jan, Mahwash, Ahmad Wali, Farhad Darya, and Naghma.

Attan is the national dance of Afghanistan, a group dance popularly performed by Afghans of all backgrounds. The dance is considered part of Afghan identity.

=== Media and entertainment ===
Afghanistan has around 350 radio stations and over 200 television stations. Radio Television Afghanistan, originating from 1925, is the state public broadcaster. Television programs began airing in the 1970s and today there are many private television channels such as TOLO and Shamshad TV. The first Afghan newspaper was published in 1873, and there are hundreds of print outlets today. By the 1920s, Radio Kabul was broadcasting local radio services. Voice of America, BBC, and Radio Free Europe/Radio Liberty (RFE/RL) broadcast in both of Afghanistan's official languages on radio. Press restrictions have been gradually relaxed and private media diversified since 2002, after more than two decades of tight controls.

Afghans have long been accustomed to watching Indian Bollywood films and listening to its filmi songs. It has been claimed that Afghanistan is among the biggest markets for the Hindi film industry. The stereotypes of Afghans in India (Kabuliwala or Pathani) have also been represented in some Bollywood films by actors. Many Bollywood film stars have roots in Afghanistan, including Salman Khan, Saif Ali Khan, Aamir Khan, Feroz Khan, Kader Khan, Naseeruddin Shah, Zarine Khan, Celina Jaitly, and a number of others. Several Bollywood films have been shot inside Afghanistan, including Dharmatma, Khuda Gawah, Escape from Taliban, and Kabul Express.

=== Cuisine ===
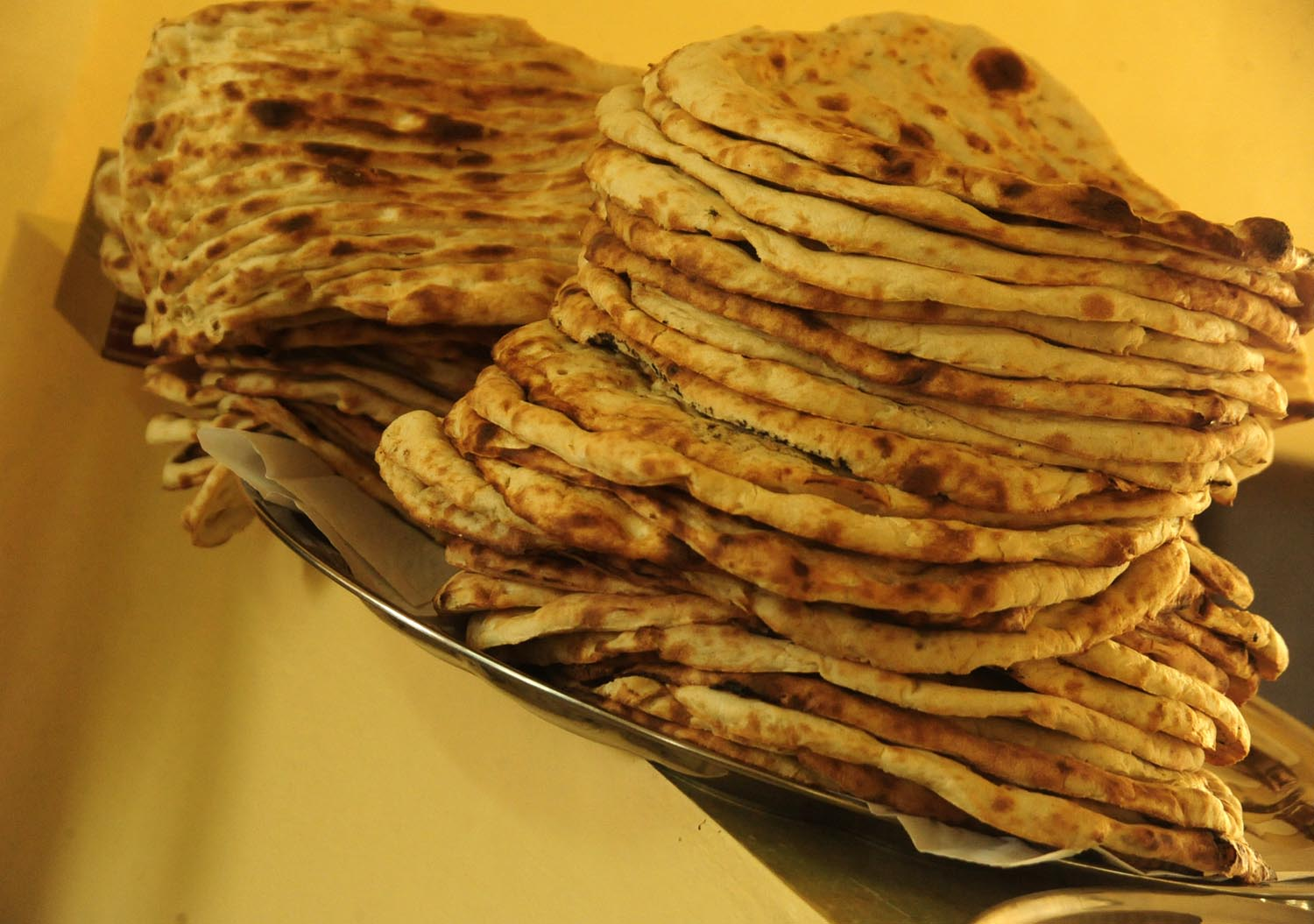
Non, the most widely consumed bread in Afghanistan

Afghan cuisine is largely based upon the nation's chief crops, such as wheat, maize, barley and rice. Accompanying these staples are native fruits and vegetables as well as dairy products such as milk, yogurt, and whey. Kabuli palaw is the national dish of Afghanistan. The nation's culinary specialties reflect its ethnic and geographic diversity. Afghanistan is known for its high-quality pomegranates, grapes, and sweet melons. Tea is a favorite drink among Afghans. A typical Afghan diet consists of naan, yogurt, rice, and meat.

=== Holidays and festivals ===
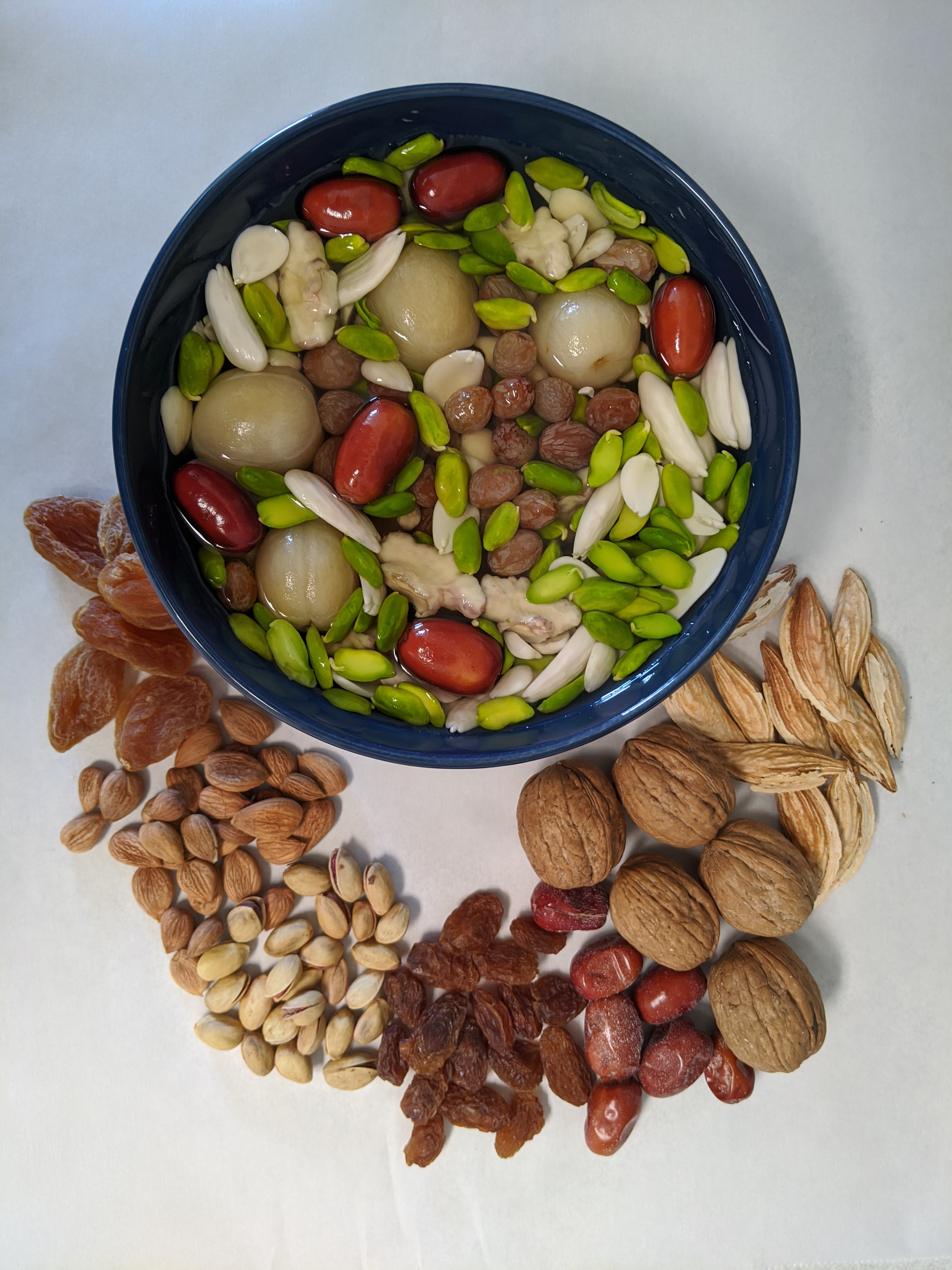
Haft mewa (seven-fruit syrup), popularly consumed during Nowruz

Afghanistan's official New Year starts with Nowruz (natively known as "Nawroz"), an ancient tradition that started as a Zoroastrian celebration in present-day Iran, and with which it shares the annual celebration along with several other countries. It occurs every year at the vernal equinox. In Afghanistan, Nowruz is typically celebrated with music and dance, as well as holding buzkashi tournaments.

Yaldā, another nationally celebrated ancient tradition, commemorates the ancient goddess Mithra and marks the longest night of the year on the eve of the winter solstice (Čilli-yi Zimistān; usually falling on 20 or 21 December), during which families gather together to recite poetry and eat fruit.

As a predominantly Muslim country, Islamic events and festivals such as Ramadan, Eid al-Fitr and Ashura are widely celebrated annually in Afghanistan. The Sikh festival of Vaisakhi is celebrated by the Sikh community and the Hindu festival Diwali by the Hindu community.

National Independence Day is celebrated on 19 August to mark the Anglo-Afghan Treaty of 1919 and the country's full independence. Several international celebrations are also officially held in Afghanistan, such as International Workers' Day, and International Women's Day. Some regional festivals include the Red Flower Festival (during Nowruz) in Mazar-i-Sharif, and the Damboora Festival in Bamyan Province.

=== Sports ===
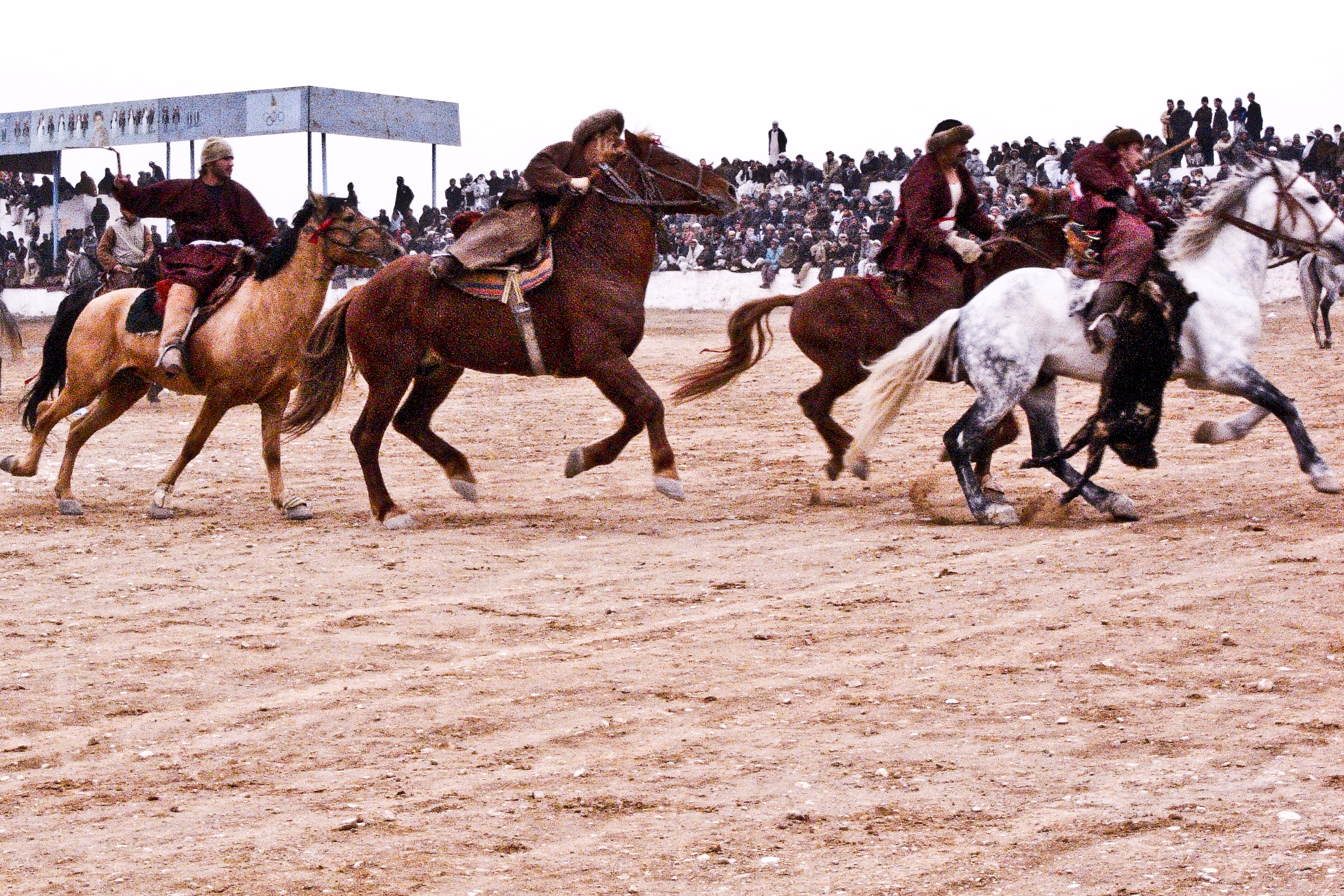
The ancient national sport of Afghanistan, Buzkashi

Sport in Afghanistan is managed by the Afghan Sports Federation. Cricket and association football are the two most popular sports in the country. The Afghan Sports Federation promotes cricket, association football, basketball, volleyball, golf, handball, boxing, taekwondo, weightlifting, bodybuilding, track and field, skating, bowling, snooker, chess, and other sports.

The Afghanistan national basketball team won the first team sports title at the 2010 South Asian Games. In 2012, the country's 3x3 basketball team won the gold medal at the 2012 Asian Beach Games. In 2013, Afghanistan's football team followed as it won the SAFF Championship.

The Afghan national cricket team, which was formed in 2001, won the 2009–10 ICC Intercontinental Cup. It won the ACC Twenty20 Cup in 2007, 2009, 2011 and 2013. The team played in the 2015, 2019, and 2023 Cricket World Cups. The Afghanistan Cricket Board (ACB) is the official governing body of the sport and is based in Kabul. The Alokozay Kabul International Cricket Ground serves as the nation's main cricket stadium. There are several other stadiums throughout the country, including the Ghazi Amanullah Khan International Cricket Stadium near Jalalabad. Domestically, cricket is played between teams from different provinces.

The Afghanistan national football team has been competing in international football since 1941. The national team plays its home games at the Ghazi Stadium in Kabul, while football in Afghanistan is governed by the Afghanistan Football Federation. The national team has never competed or qualified for the FIFA World Cup but won an international football trophy in 2013. The country also has a national team in the sport of futsal, a 5-a-side variation of football.

The traditional and the national sport of Afghanistan is buzkashi, particularly popular in the north. It is similar to polo, played by horsemen in two teams, each trying to grab and hold a goat carcass. The Afghan Hound (a type of running dog) originated in Afghanistan and was used in wolf hunting.

== See also ==
- Outline of Afghanistan
