= Healthcare in Afghanistan =

Healthcare in Afghanistan has gradually improved in the last decades after being almost non-existent due to the civil war and mass exodus in the 1990s. There are about 5,000 health facilities operating in Afghanistan, with more being built according to the country's Ministry of Public Health. As of 2022, about 38,000 women serve as midwives.

Afghanistan's healthcare system remains weak and requires international assistance. In this regard, officials from the Islamic Emirate often seek cooperation from neighboring and regional countries. Despite having around 200 pharmaceutical companies in the country, most medicines are imported from other countries.

== Health facilities ==
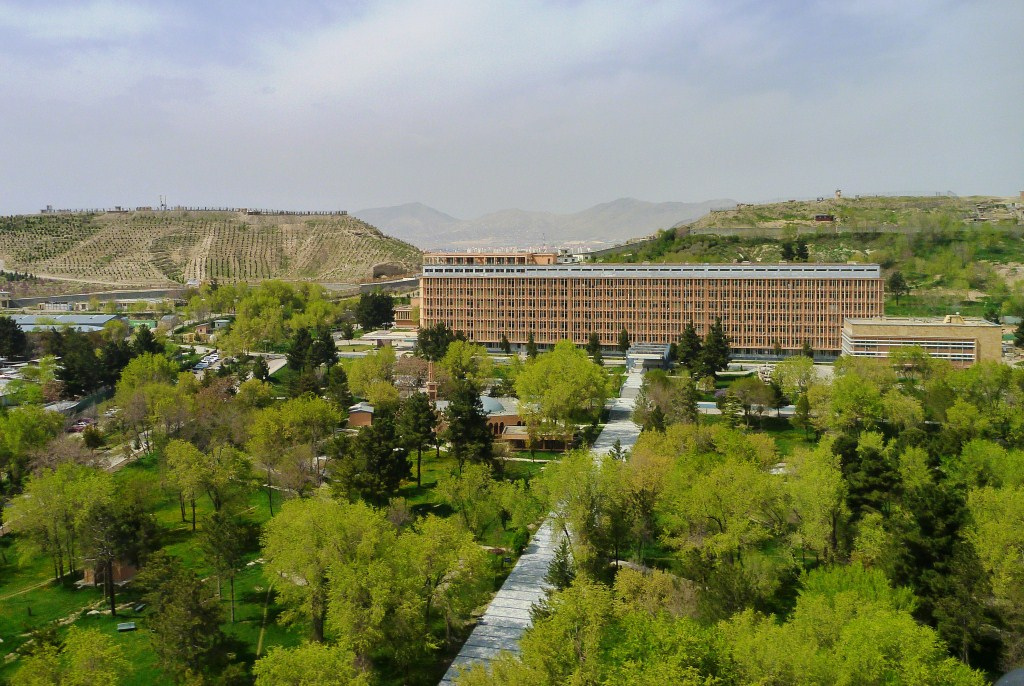
The Daoud Khan Hospital in the Wazir Akbar Khan neighborhood of Kabul

Health centers such as hospitals, clinics, dentist offices and pharmacies can be found in all provinces of Afghanistan. There are 100s of public and private hospitals in the country. Some are administered by international non-governmental organizations. The most advanced medical treatments are available in Kabul, Kandahar, Herat, and Mazar-i-Sharif. The Maiwand Teaching Hospital and the Wazir Akbar Khan Hospital in Kabul were established in the 1960s. They were designed to treat between 300 and 400 patients a day. There are currently over 130 hospitals in Kabul, which include Al-Hayat Hospital, Ariana Medical Complex, Cure Hospital, Daoud Khan Hospital, French Medical Institute for Children, Hila Hospital, Indira Gandhi Children's Hospital, Jamhuriat Hospital, Jinnah Hospital, and Khairkhwa Medical Complex. The Mirwais Hospital, the Aino Mina Hospital and Mohmand Hospital are three of the major hospitals in Kandahar. More such hospitals are needed in Afghanistan.

About 87 percent of Afghanistan's population has access to basic healthcare, and citizens themselves pay approximately 75% of healthcare costs directly. When Afghans get injured or are sick they first visit local pharmacies or clinics for treatment purposes. The second step is to travel to a district or provincial hospital. These health facilities exist in nearly all provinces and districts of Afghanistan. The third step requires visiting major hospitals in Kabul, and the last step is getting treatment in hospitals abroad. This has been done throughout history. Citizens of Afghanistan spend over $500 million US dollars a year on medical treatment in other countries. Most have been going to Pakistan, India and Turkey. Some go to a hospital inside the Airitom Free Zone in Termez, Uzbekistan, where travel visas are not required.

== Health professionals ==
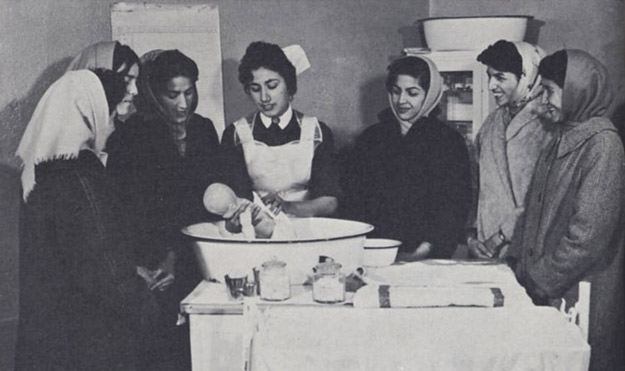
Female health professionals inside the infant ward of a hospital in Kabul in the 1960s

Afghanistan has one of the lowest health worker density in the Eastern Mediterranean Region, with a ratio of 10.3 medical doctors, nurses and midwives per 10,000 people, considerably below the threshold for critical shortage of 23 health professionals per 10,000 people.

According to a 2012 report by Save the Children, improved healthcare and the rise of females attending school have made Afghanistan climb up from its position as the worst place on earth to be a mother. "More mothers are surviving and fewer children are dying and this is something we need to be celebrating," said Rachel Maranto, Advocacy and Mobilisation senior Manager at Save the Children in Kabul. In 2022 Afghanistan had about 38,000 midwives. In 2011, Sima Ayubi, a maternity doctor in Kabul advocating hospital births, has explained: "Now pregnant women have more information about health. This mortality rate is still a problem. There's just a decrease. The problem is not completely eliminated or under control."

A mural promoting breast feeding in Bamyan Province

In December 2024, the Ministry of Public Health banned women from being trained in nursing and midwifery. This was a reversal of an earlier February 2024 decision to permit basic medical training for women. According to NPR, the health ministry had lobbied for an exemption from the general ban on women's education in the healthcare sector because "in some provinces, the Taliban does not allow women to seek treatment from male medical professionals." The Taliban's ban on basic medical training for women was widely condemned by human rights organizations as a danger to the health and well-being of Afghan women and children, with Afghanistan already having among the highest maternal mortality ratios in the world according to 2020 data. For example, Heather Barr of Human Right Watch stated: "If you ban women from being treated by male healthcare professionals, and then you ban women from training to become healthcare professionals, the consequences are clear: women will not have access to healthcare and will die as a result." The Office of the United Nations High Commissioner for Human Rights stated that the ban "is profoundly discriminatory, short-sighted and puts the lives of women and girls at risk in multiple ways."

== Statistics ==
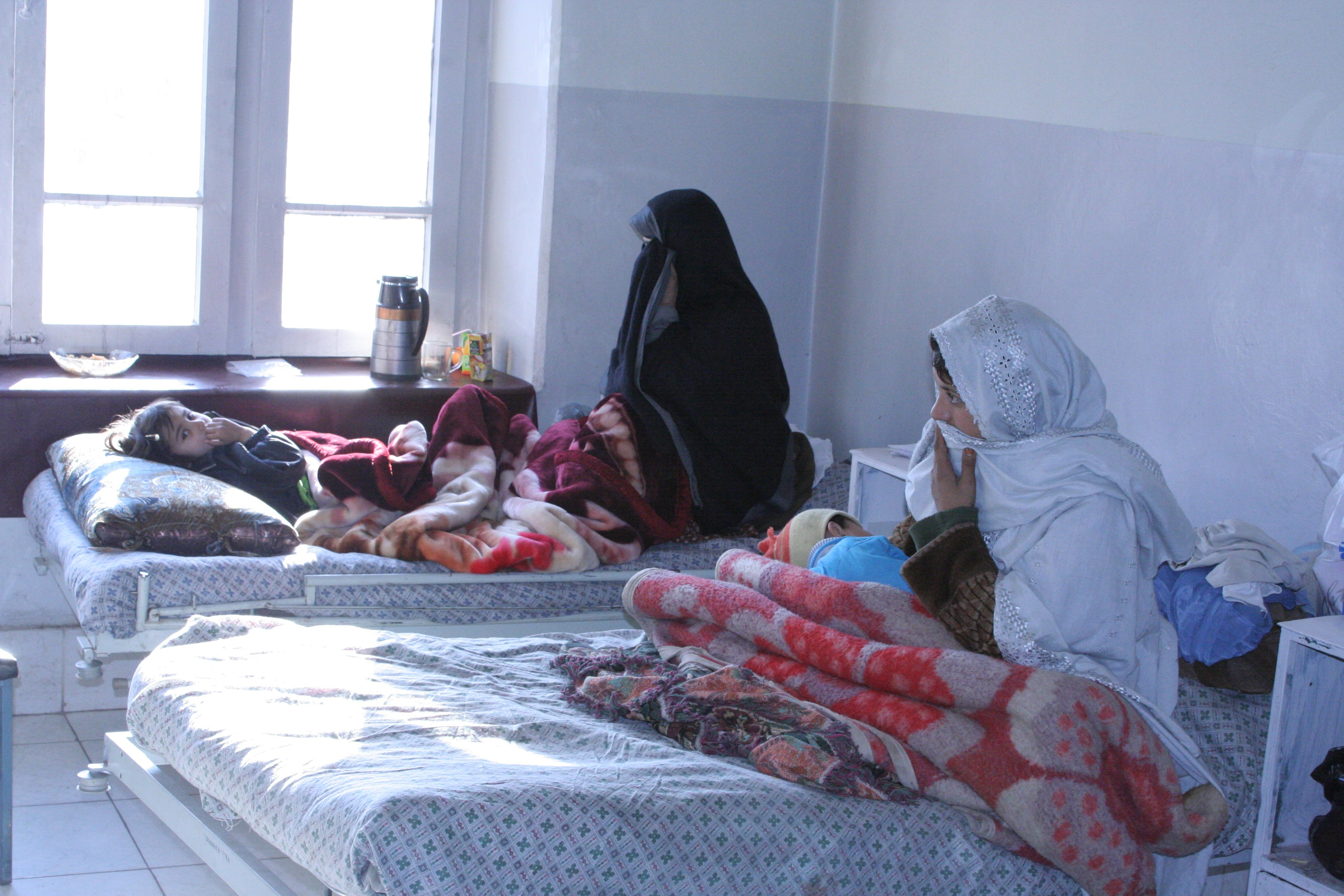
The recovery area of a hospital in 2006

Afghanistan has a population of around 46 million people. It is one of the least developed countries, with an estimated life expectancy of 66 years. Its maternal mortality rate is estimated at 521 deaths per 100,000 live births, and its child mortality rate estimated at 55 deaths per 1,000 live births.

Afghans generally live a healthy lifestyle so they visit hospitals less frequently. They do not drink alcohol, and only small number of them smoke tobacco. Many work all day and eat only organic food. Fruits and vegetables have always been a major part of Afghan cuisine, particularly nuts and dried fruits. And the water they drink comes from springs. Glenn Foster, an American contractor working in Afghanistan in the 1950s, stated this about the country:

Even though there are masses of people, the country seems able to feed them all. Although their diet may not be abundant, you don't see the hunger that you do in some countries....

The same can be said today. Afghanistan was somewhat ahead of its time until the 1978 Saur Revolution. That revolution led to a continues war and gradual poverty in the country, which began with the closure of borders and suspension of political ties between Afghanistan and its southern and western neighbors (Pakistan and Iran). Many Afghans, especially the elite class began escaping from the country. They included most of the doctors and nurses. By 1992, when a major civil war began in Kabul, nearly all doctors and nurses had immigrated to other countries. This was reversed in the early 2000s after the Islamic Republic of Afghanistan came to power.

The monthly salary of a medical doctor working in a hospital is anywhere between $700 and $4,860 US dollars. User fees have been a major deterrent to accessing healthcare in the country. Various interventions have been devised to improve uptake of healthcare services, including the distribution of waiver cards to very poor and female-headed households and the introduction of community-based health insurance. Large number of disabled people registered with the Ministry of Martyrs and Disabled Affairs get various forms of assistance from the government.

Following the national user fee ban in 2008, a pilot study conducted by the Future Health Systems consortium found a 400% increase in utilization of services that had previously charged fees for services and medicine. The government's strategy to collaborate with non-governmental organizations has led to higher primary health outcomes among the poor, with relatively high levels of perceived healthcare quality reported by clients in a recent study of primary care services.

== See also ==
- List of universities in Afghanistan
