= Wazir Akbar Khan Hospital =

Hospital in Kabul, Afghanistan

Geography
- Location: Wazir Akbar Khan, Kabul, Afghanistan

Organisation
- Type: Inpatients

Services
- Emergency department: Yes
- Beds: 210

Helipads
- Helipad: No

History
- Founded: 1964

The Wazir Akbar Khan Hospital is a 210-bed public hospital in the affluent Wazir Akbar Khan neighborhiood of Kabul, Afghanistan. It is located southeast of the Wazir Akbar Khan Hill, near Daoud Khan Military Hospital and the Indira Gandhi Children's Hospital.

Named after Wazir Akbar Khan, the hospital was established in 1964. It has been one of the busiest hospitals, especially during the decades of waer. As of September 2026, docters at the hospital can perform surgeries involving laparoscopy.

== See also ==
- List of hospitals in Afghanistan
