= Atatürk Children's Hospital =

Atatürk National Children Speciality Hospital

Geography
- Location: Kabul, Afghanistan
- Coordinates: 34.5208°N 69.1341°E

Organisation
- Funding: Ministry of Public Health
- Type: Children's hospital
- Patron: Turkish Cooperation and Coordination Agency

Services
- Beds: 200

The Atatürk National Children Speciality Hospital is a 200-bed children's hospital located in Kabul, Afghanistan. It is one of the largest children's hospital in the city.

The hospital is administered by the Afghan Ministry of Public Health. It is located in the affluent Shahr-e Naw neighborhood, next to the French Medical Institute for Children and very close to Kabul University.

Gulam Hasan Kamil is the chief physician.

== History ==
The hospital receives large amounts of funding and is closely tied to the Turkish Cooperation and Coordination Agency (TİKA). In 2000 the Turkish government sent $15,000 to the hospital and in 2012 sent five ambulances carrying 40 pieces of equipment to the hospital.

On June 27, 2019, a doctor at the hospital was beaten and given death threats by a police officer. Many staff members went on strike in protest.

After the May 2020 terrorist attack in the Dasht-e-Barchi hospital, all babies inside the hospital were moved to the Atatürk Children's Hospital. UNICEF representatives visited the hospital on 20 September 2021.

On 2 March 2022, TİKA announced it had drilled a 200 metres (7,900 in) well for the hospital after concerns it was facing issues over the water supply. That same year the Yunus Emre Institute said it had opened a Turkish-language course for professionals in the hospital.

== See also ==
- List of hospitals in Afghanistan
