= Shahr-e Naw Park =

Urban park in Kabul, Afghanistan

- پارک شهرنو / د شهرنو پارک
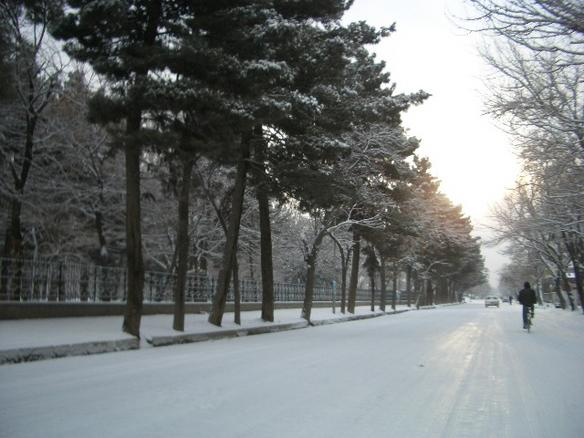
- Shahr-e Naw Park during winter
- Interactive map of Shahr-e Naw Park
- Location: Kabul, Afghanistan
- Coordinates: 34°32′00″N 69°10′06″E
- Status: Active
- Parking: Yes

The Shahr-e Naw Park (Pashto: د شهرنو پارک), also known as Pārk-e Shahr-e Naw (Dari: پارک شهرنو), is the largest public park in the affluent Shahr-e Naw neighborhood of Kabul, Afghanistan. It is one of several original open-space parks planned by Afghan kings during the 19th century.

The entire park is being rehabilitated by the Kabul Municipality and private entities. Around the park are business and apartment complexes, mostly restaurants, cafes, gift shops, grocery stores, and other such retailers. The Sun Tower is currently being built across from the park's eastern corner, next to Barg Restaurant. It is to be the tallest tower in Shahr-e Naw.

== See also ==
- Bagh-e Bala Palace
- Chaman-e-Hozori
- Chihil Sutun
- Gardens of Babur
- Qargha Reservoir
- Wazir Akbar Khan Hill
- Zarnegar Park
