= List of hospitals in Afghanistan =

This is a partial list of Hospitals in Afghanistan. There are around 5,000 health facilities in Afghanistan, which include public and private hospitals. Nearly all districts of Afghanistan have at least one public hospital, with more being built according to the country's Ministry of Public Health. There are currently 135 licensed hospitals in Kabul District.

Hospital	Location	Owner	Beds
Abu Ali Sina-e-Balkhi Regional Hospital	Mazar-i-Sharif	Private	
ADEI Medical Complex	Kabul	Private	
Afghan-Japan Hospital	Kabul	Public	100
Afghan Mercy Hospital	Kabul	Private	130
Aftaab International Hospital	Mazar-i-Sharif	Private	
Ahmad Shah Baba Hospital	Kabul	Médecins Sans Frontières	58
Aino Mina Hospital	Kandahar	Public	350
Al Farhad Hospital	Kandahar	Private	
Al-Hayat Hospital	Kabul	Private	42
Aliabad Teaching Hospital	Kabul	Public	206
American Medical Center	Kabul	Private	
Amiri Medical Complex	Kabul	Private	90
Andkhoy Hospital	Andkhoy	Public	35
Antani Hospital	Kabul	Public	
Aqcha Hospital	Aqcha District	Public	27
Aria Apollo Hospital	Herat	Private	
Ariana Medical Complex	Kabul	Private	300
Asadabad Hospital	Asadabad	Public	66
Atatürk Children's Hospital	Kabul	Public	200
Avicenna Medical Hospital for Drug Treatment	Kabul	Public	1,000
Ayoubi Hospital	Kandahar	Private	
Baghlan District Hospital	Baghlan District	Public	32
Baharak Hospital	Baharak District	Public	31
Balkh Hospital	Balkh	Public	24
Bamyan Central Hospital	Bamyan	Public	53
Bamyan Provincial Hospital	Bamyan	Public	141
Baraki Rojan Hospital	Baraki Barak District	Public	56
Bost Hospital	Lashkargah	Médecins Sans Frontières	300
Chaki Wardak Hospital	Chak District	Public	67
Changaram Hospital	Panjshir	Public	28
Children's Health Hospital	Kabul	Public	
CURE International Hospital	Kabul	Private	
Dar-ul-Sehat Curative Hospital	Kabul	Private	
Dasht-e-Barchi Hospital	Kabul	Médecins Sans Frontières	
Dasht-i-Qala Hospital	Yangi Qala District	Public	70
Daoud Khan Military Hospital	Kabul	Public	400
DK-German Medical Center	Kabul	Private	
DUA Speciality Hospital	Jalalabad	Private	410
Egyptian Field Hospital	Bagram	Public	
Farah City Hospital	Farah	Public	
Farah Provincial Hospital	Farah	Public	92
Farkhar Hospital	Farkhar District	Public	20
Faryab Central Hospital	Maymana	Public	45
Fatima Al-Zahra Provincial Hospital	Jalalabad	Public	50
Fayzabad Hospital	Fayzabad	Public	100
French Medical Institute for Children	Kabul	Private	176
Gardez Civil Hospital	Gardez District	Public	58
General Hospital of Public Health	Jalalabad	Public	410
Ghazni Civil Provincial Hospital	Ghazni	Public	156
Ghor Provincial Hospital	Chaghcharan District	Public	36
Guzara District Hospital	Guzara District	Public	56
Habibyar International Hospital	Herat	Private	
Hasna Hospital	Kabul	Private	
Heathe N. Craig Joint Theater Hospital	Bagram	Public	50
Herat Regional Hospital	Herat	Public	491
Hila Hospital	Kabul	Private	
Ibn Sina Hospital	Kabul	Public	138
Indira Gandhi Children's Hospital	Kabul	Public	300
Inferally Hospital	Daymirdad District	Public	29
Irene Salimi Hospital	Kabul	Private	50
Jaghori Hospital	Jaghori District	Public	40
Jamhuriat Hospital	Kabul	Public	350
Jamshid Hospital	Taloqan	Private	20
Jawzjan Provincial Hospital	Jowzjan	Public	212
Jinnah Hospital	Kabul	Public	200
Kabul Children's Hospital	Kabul	Public	
Kabul Infectious Diseases Hospital	Kabul	Public	120
Kabul Mental Health Hospital	Kabul	Public	60
Kaisha Health Care Kabul	Kabul	Private	
Kapisa Provincial Hospital	Mahmud Raqi District	Public	48
Karte 3 Surgical Hospital	Kabul	Public	454
Khair Khana Hospital	Kabul	Public	109
Khairkhwa Medical Complex	Kabul	Private	
Khan Medical Complex	Kabul	Private	200
Khost Provincial Hospital	Khost District	Public	83
Khulm District Hospital	Khulm District	Public	50
Kod Barq Hospital	Dihdadi District	Public	54
Kunduz Regional Hospital	Kunduz District	Public	87
Lashkargah General Hospital	Lashkargah District	Public	162
Loqman Hakim Complex Hospital	Herat	Private	
Maidan Wardak Hospital	Maidan Shar District	Public	38
Maiwand Teaching Hospital	Kabul	Public	250
Malalai Maternity Hospital	Kabul	Public	517
Maulawi Abdul Tahir Hospital	Andar District	Public	25
Mawlana Hospital	Mazar-i-Sharif	Private	
Mazar-i-Sharif General Civil Hospital	Mazar-i-Sharif	Public	237
Medical Hospital of Nangarhar	Jalalabad	Public	288
Mehraban Hospital	Herat	Private	
Mehtar Laam Baba Regional Hospital	Mehtarlam District	Public	77
Mellat Medical Complex	Kabul	Private	200
Ministry of Mines Hospital	Puli Khumri District	Public	16
Mirwais Hospital	Kandahar	Public	600
Mohmand International Hospital	Kandahar	Private	200
Mussa Wardak Hospital	Kabul	Private	30
Nasagee Hospital	Puli Khumri	Public	95
Nangarhar Regional Hospital	Jalalabad	Public	
Nayab Aminullah Khan Logar Hospital	Puli Alam District	Public	50
Nesaji Gulbahar Hospital	Kohistan District	Public	68
Nijrab District Hospital	Nijrab District	Public	21
Nimroz Regional Hospital	Zaranj	Public	100
Nishtar Kidney Center	Jalalabad	Public	100
Noor Hospital (1)	Kabul	Public	41
Noor Hospital (2)	Kabul	Public	75
Paktia Infectious Disease Hospital	Gardez	Public	50
Panjab Eye Hospital	Panjab	Public	27
Panjshir Emergency Surgical Centre	Panjshir	Public	85
Parwan Provincial Hospital	Charikar	Public	60
Police Hospital	Kabul	Public	71
Pul-i-Khumri Civil Hospital	Puli Khumri	Public	84
Qala-i-Naw District Hospital	Qala e Naw District	Public	86
Quiat Al Khair Hospital	Saydabad District	Public	35
Rabia-i-Balkhi Hospital	Kabul	Public	250
Rahmat Hospital	Kabul	Private	
Rahnavard Hospital	Mazar-i-Sharif	Private	
Raziqi Hospital	Herat	Private	
Rifah Medical Complex	Kabul	Private	50
Royal Medical Complex	Kabul	Private	50
Rukha Hospital	Panjshir	Public	28
Sadre Abn Seena Hospital	Kabul	Public	90
SAMI Hospital	Kabul	Private	40
Sana Medical Complex	Kabul	Private	50
Sar-i-Pul Provincial Hospital	Sar-e Pol	Public	34
Sehat Hospital	Herat	Private	
Sharan Hospital	Sharana	Public	74
Sheikh Zayed National Neuroscience Hospital	Kabul	Public	82
Shenwar Ghani Khail Hospital	Shinwar District	Public	52
Shino Zada Hospital	Kabul	Private	
Sial Curative Hospital	Kandahar	Private	
Sidal Hospital	Kandahar	Private	
Stomatology Hospital	Kabul	Public	30
Surgical Centre for War Victims in Kabul	Kabul	EMERGENCY	102
Takhar Provincial Hospital	Taloqan	Public	150
Ulqan District Hospital	Shahristan District	Public	30
Wamy Hospital	Tsamkani District	Public	60
Wazir Akbar Khan Hospital	Kabul	Public	210
Yakawlang Hospital	Yakawlang District	Public	36
Zabul Provincial Hospital	Qalat	Public	300
Zaranj Hospital	Zaranj	Public	32
ZNN Medical Lab	Kabul	Private	

== See also ==
- Healthcare in Afghanistan
