= Participants in Operation Enduring Freedom =

Countries that partook in the 2001 United States-led invasion of Afghanistan

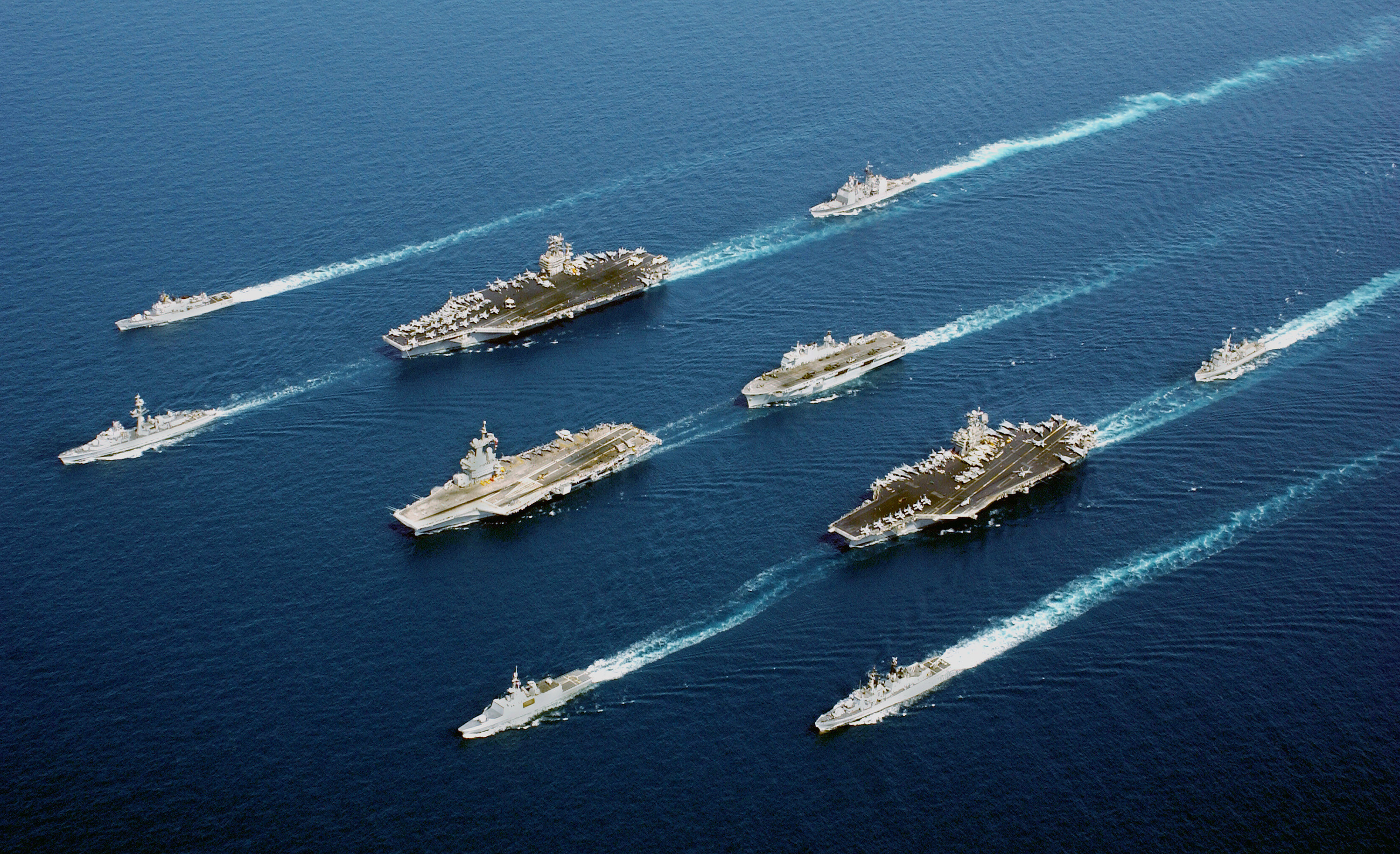
A NATO multinational fleet (namely the United States, the United Kingdom, Italy, France, and the Netherlands) during Operation Enduring Freedom in the Oman Sea. In four descending columns, from left to right: Maestrale, De Grasse; USS John C. Stennis, Charles de Gaulle, Surcouf; USS Port Royal, HMS Ocean, USS John F. Kennedy, HNLMS Van Amstel; and Luigi Durand de la Penne

Following the September 11 attacks in 2001, several countries began military operations against Al-Qaeda and the Taliban during Operation Enduring Freedom (OEF) in Afghanistan. After the initial bombing operations, Operation Crescent Wind, OEF was the initial combat operations, and during 2002 and 2003.

This list covers United States and other nations' forces and other forms of support for OEF from October 2001. Some nations' operations in Afghanistan continued as part of NATO's International Security Assistance Force (ISAF). For example, United States troops were deployed both in the OEF and ISAF.

== Albania ==
Between 2003 and 2013 Albania deployed a total of 2,399 troops to Afghanistan with members of the Special Operations Battalion (Albania) operating in various mission across the provinces of Kandahar and Herat.

== Australia ==
At their peak Australian troops in Afghanistan numbered 1,550. John Howard's government was one of the only national governments to openly support operations in Afghanistan at the war's beginning, along with the United States and the United Kingdom. Australian troops were deployed to Uruzgan province, while Special Forces personnel also operated in Afghanistan.

== Armenia ==
The Armed Forces of Armenia tripled its Afghan contingent to 130 personnel and possibly increased its military presence in Afghanistan to 260 personnel at the next troop rotation.

== Azerbaijan ==
The Azerbaijani Armed Forces deployed over 184 soldiers to Afghanistan.

== Bangladesh ==
Bangladesh provided the use of its airspace and seaports. Bangladeshi NGOs, particularly BRAC, are among the largest and most active development agencies in Afghanistan.

== Belgium ==
In 2002, a tri-national detachment known as the European Participating Air Forces of 18 Danish, Netherlands and Norwegian F-16 ground attack fighters aircraft deployed to Manas Air Base in Kyrgyzstan to support operations in Afghanistan. Belgium contributed a C-130 Hercules and four F-16 aircraft.

== Bosnia and Herzegovina ==
Bosnia and Herzegovina deployed a unit of 37 men to destroy munitions and clear mines, in addition to 6 command personnel, as part of the Multinational force in Iraq. The unit was first deployed to Fallujah, then Talil Air Base, and is now located at Camp Echo. In December 2006, the Bosnian government formally extended its mandate through June 2007. Bosnia and Herzegovina planned to send another 49 soldiers from the 6th infantry division to Iraq in August 2008, their mission, to protect/guard Camp Victory in Baghdad.

== Bulgaria ==
Bulgaria deployed 608 troops in Afghanistan, as well as medical personnel.

== Canada ==
In 2002, Canada had 2,100 personnel in the CENTCOM region (1,100 land, 225 air (6 aircraft) and 700 naval personnel (3 ships)). Ground troops included elements of the Princess Patricia's Canadian Light Infantry Regiment and Royal Canadian Regiment, and JTF2 special forces. Since initial deployments supporting OEF, Canadian forces have supported OEF and ISAF. Since the summer of 2006, the expanded Canadian force supported the NATO ISAF mission in south Afghanistan.

Canada pledged to stop its military operations there by the end of 2014. And had begun logistical preparations to end any substantive combat role by the end of 2011

== People's Republic of China ==
The People's Republic of China provided mine-clearance and police training for Afghan Security Forces, but resisted international pressure to deploy troops to the country. The Chinese government considered Afghanistan a quagmire, and feared that if troops were deployed, rising casualties would provoke massive antiwar sentiment in China, due to the one-child policy.

== Cyprus ==
Cyprus offered the United States and allies use of its airspace and airports. Also, the United Kingdom used its RAF bases in their Sovereign Base Areas in Atrokiri and Dhekelia to stage attacks and aid the ground forces.

== Czech Republic ==
In April 2007, a 35-man deployment of the Czech Military Police's Special Operations Group was deployed to Helmand Province to support British forces under ISAF command in a variety of force protection and Direct Action tasks. In 2011, The Czech deployment was increased with a full deployment of a Special Operations Task Group, including the 601st Special Forces Group under the newly formed ISAF SOF (Special Operations Forces) Command.

Provided training and material support for allied Afghan forces (donation of Mi-17 and Mi-24 helicopters to ANA). Sent 3 times a Special Forces Detachment (601st Special Forces Group). Other activities in ISAF – field hospital, KAIA airfield command, PRT Logar, force protection for German PRT and Dutch PRT.

== Denmark ==
Since 2002 the number of ground forces committed by the Danish army was steadily increased from 50 to 750 soldiers and support staff. These forces include a tank platoon with three Leopard 2 model 2A5DK tanks. The majority of the Danish forces are deployed in the Helmand Province operating in the Gerishk District as part of the ISAF force under UK command. The Danish forces suffered substantial casualties including 43 deaths up till January, 2013. This is currently the highest level of casualties compared to the contribution size.

Additionally Danish Jægerkorpset special forces have been deployed at various times – including a substantial number in 2002. In 2002, a tri-national detachment known as the European Participating Air Forces of 18 Danish, Netherlands and Norwegian F-16 ground attack/fighter aircraft deployed to Manas in Kyrgyzstan to support operations in Afghanistan. Denmark contributed 6 F-16 aircraft.

Lars Løkke Rasmussen, prime minister of Denmark (2009-2011), said his country's commitment depended on whether Afghanistan's 7 November presidential runoff produced a credible leader (the run off was cancelled).

== Egypt ==
Egyptian Field Hospital at Bagram: Egypt opened an Egyptian Field Hospital at Bagram in 2003. The hospital treated more than 7,000 Afghans per month. Treatment is provided free of charge. 31 percent of the hospital's patients were children. Egypt offered the use of its airspace.

== Estonia ==
Estonia offered the use of its airspace and provided logistical support in theatre. Estonia deployed about 150, and later a further 250, to Afghanistan.

== France ==
Over 4,000 personnel including the Marine Nationale (one CVBG, comprising the aircraft carrier Charles de Gaulle, frigates La Motte-Picquet, Jean de Vienne and Jean Bart, the nuclear attack submarine Rubis, the tanker Meuse and the aviso Commandant Ducuing) 3,200 ground troops and 350 from the Armée de l'Air (12 Mirage 2000, Mirage F1 and Mirage IV ground-attack and reconnaissance aircraft). The first deployed French force was composed of soldiers from the 21st Marine Infantry Regiment deployed on 17 November 2001, to Mazar-e Sharif.

French special forces operators served in Afghanistan since the formation of ISAF, in 2003 150 COS operators were deployed to replace the Italian ISAF contingent, the COS primarily conducted reconnaissance and close-protection tasks. In 2001 and beginning again in the summer of 2003, 200 soldiers from various units of the Army Special Forces Brigade (BFST), along with marine and air commandos, have conducted operations against the Taliban, under command and in co-operation with US special operations forces present in the area. French forces have since supported the ISAF mission.

Between 2003 and 2007, a 200-man COS unit operated under direct ISAF SOF command of OEF-A, their tasks were restricted to what author Stephen Saideman said was "short-term counter terrorism and counterinsurgency raids" rather than longer Special Reconnaissance missions, nor were they allowed to conduct partnered operations. Despite the restrictions, French SOF operators were carried out a large number of successful Direct Action operations, often in joint operations with American and sometimes British special forces. The French special forces contribution to OEF-A ended in 2007 after disputes over its role.

In August 2008, France took control of the Kabul regional command. Ten French troops were killed and a further 21 wounded in an attack – the heaviest loss of troops France has suffered since deploying to Afghanistan in 2002 – it was announced on 19 August.

In 2009, a 150-man French special forces task group deployed operating directly for the French ISAF contribution and also conducted significant mentoring of Afghan security forces. As of 17 September 2011, 75 French soldiers had died. All French forces left Afghanistan in 2012.

== Georgia ==
Georgia deployed 174 troops to Afghanistan, and deployed 1,900 peacekeepers in 2010 for peacekeeping and counter-terrorism operations.

A total of 750–800 soldiers are being deployed since 2010, making Georgia the highest net contributor per capita to the coalition forces.

== Germany ==
In 2002, Germany had 2,560 personnel in the region. The German Navy has had three Frigates, one Fast Patrol Boat Group (five units) and four supply ships operating out of Djibouti, in the Gulf of Aden. A German Airbus A310 aircraft was on alert in Germany for use as a medevac platform. German forces have since supported the ISAF mission.

Although nominally under OEF command, the KSK worked under ISAF command since 2005, carrying out numerous operations in the vicinity of the German deployment in Kabul, including a successful raid on an al-Qaeda safehouse for suicide bombers in October 2006. GSG9 was also deployed to the Kabul area, providing specialist close protection to German officials and facilities. KSK operators commented in the German media about the restrictions placed on them by their national caveats and stated a preference for working directly for the Americans as part of OEF-A as they had done as part of Task Force K-Bar.

== Greece ==
Greek naval vessels supported the ISAF from 2002 to its end in 2021.

== Hungary ==
The Hungarian Defence Forces was present in Afghanistan from January 2003 with a military force that was continuously expanding both in terms of troop numbers and capabilities as part of an international coalition formed by the troops of 50 nations. Hungary ended evacuations in Afghanistan in 2021 after airlifting 540 people including Hungarian citizens and Afghans and their families who had worked for Hungarian forces previously.

== India ==
India had offered all operational assistance to the United States, including use of its facilities, in any operations launched in pursuit of the perpetrators of the 11 September attack. Importantly Indian intelligence officials provided the United States with needed information concerning the financing and training of Islamic extremist groups in Afghanistan and Pakistan. The Indian government had also offered the United States the use of its territory for staging any military operations in Afghanistan.

On the naval front, India provided a frigate for escorting coalition shipping through the Straits of Malacca, made shipyards available for coalition ship repairs and opened ports for naval port calls. India offered the US its air bases and provided the Northern Alliance with logistical support. The Indian Army opened a hospital in Tajikistan, to treat injured Northern Alliance soldiers. India also loaned Mi-17 helicopters to the Northern Alliance.

== Iran ==
Iran, having viewed the Taliban as an enemy, aided coalition forces in an uprising in Herat. Iran also agreed to open borders to receive the expected increased migration of refugees from Afghanistan.

== Ireland ==
Ireland permitted US military aircraft to use Shannon Airport as a refuelling hub. Also, Ireland had seven troops deployed to the ISAF's headquarters in Kabul.

== Italy ==
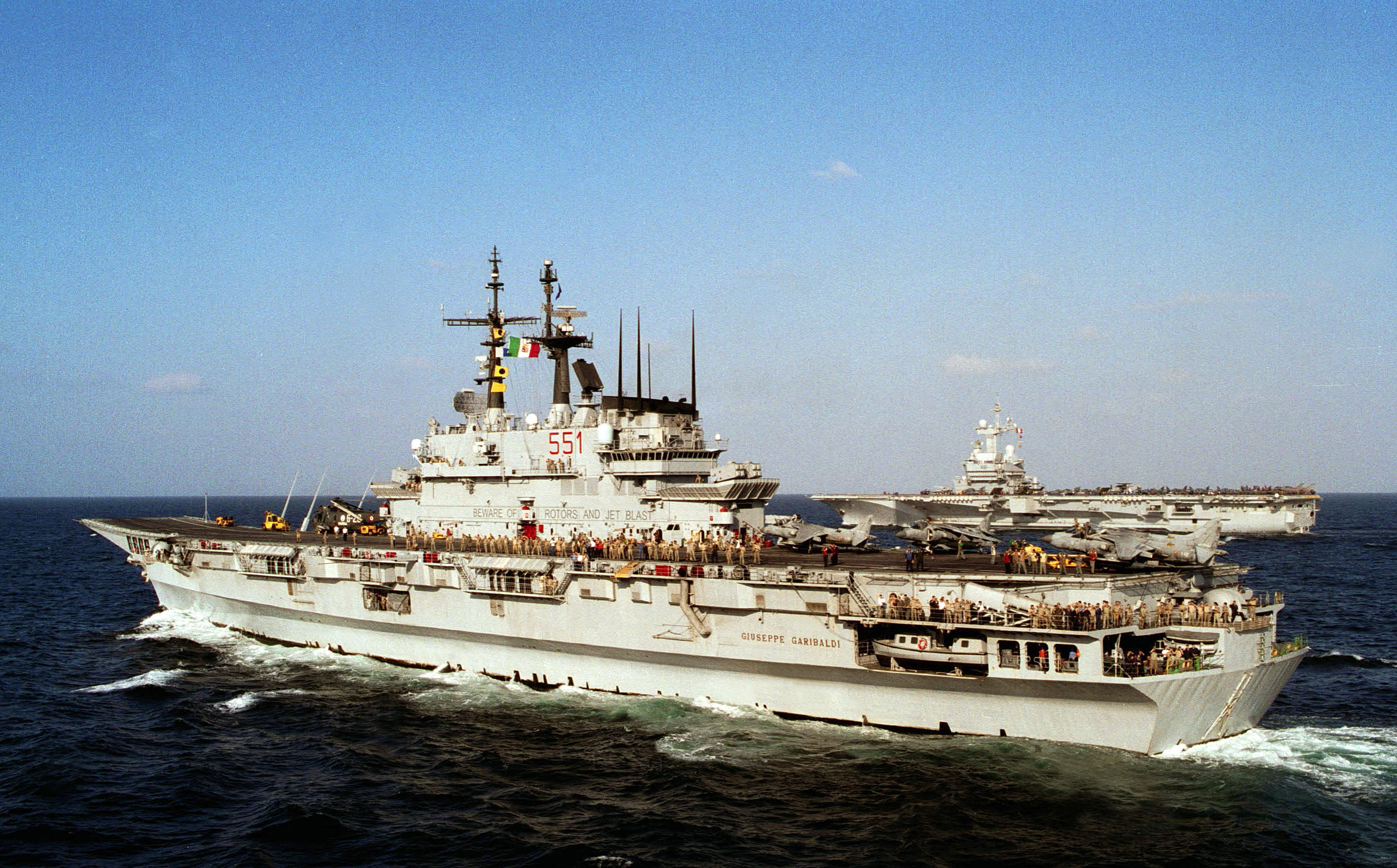
The Italian aircraft carrier Giuseppe Garibaldi and French aircraft carrier Charles de Gaulle seen from USS Theodore Roosevelt (1 February 2002)

Italy deployed Col Moschin and Gruppo Operativo Incursori (GOI) to Afghanistan, Italian Special Operations Forces were not under US-led OEF-A command, instead it operated directly in support of the Italian ISAF Task force-Nibbio, where they carried out local force protection and reconnaissance tasks.

At the peak of its deployment, Italy had 4,200 troops stationed in Afghanistan at any given time.

Italian naval warships including its only Carrier Battle Group (with the aircraft carrier Giuseppe Garibaldi) supported combat operations in the North Arabian Sea. Italy deployed a 43-man engineer team to Bagram, Afghanistan to repair the runway in May 2002.

== Japan ==
Japan provided logistical support on coalition forces and financial, reconstruction and development support.

== Kuwait ==
Kuwait provided basing and overflight permissions for all US and coalition forces.

== Kyrgyzstan ==
Kyrgyzstan allowed US and allied aircraft to use Manas Air Base.

== Latvia ==
Provided logistical support. At the peak of deployment in 2011 about 374 soldiers were present in operational regions.1

== Lithuania ==
40 Special Forces AITVARAS troops, from November 2002 to 2004. After 2005 Lithuania deployed up to 268 soldiers. Most of them were deployed in PRT Chaghcharan.

Lithuanian special forces were involved in Special Reconnaissance missions, from 2006 they were in action in southern Afghanistan with British forces.

== North Macedonia ==
North Macedonia had 244 troops in Afghanistan.

== Malaysia ==
Malaysia provided use of its airspace and logistical support.

== Montenegro ==
Montenegro was scheduled to deploy 40 soldiers, a three-member medical team, and two officers under German command to Afghanistan in 2010.

== Netherlands ==
The Netherlands deployed 165 KCT operators backed up by four Dutch Chinooks in 2005 under the direct command of OEF-A. In 2006 under ISAF mandate, the KCT deployed to Tarinkot in Uruzgan Province to work alongside Australian forces, the KCT conducted long-range reconnaissance and specialist intelligence gathering for both the Dutch Battle Group and ISAF SOF command.

The Netherlands helped in 2006 included a build, fight and air support mission in Afghanistan with 2100 soldiers. In 2010 all Netherlands troops returned home and a few months later they began a police training mission with the Marechaussee and the Task Force. The Netherlands troops were members of the ISAF.

== New Zealand ==
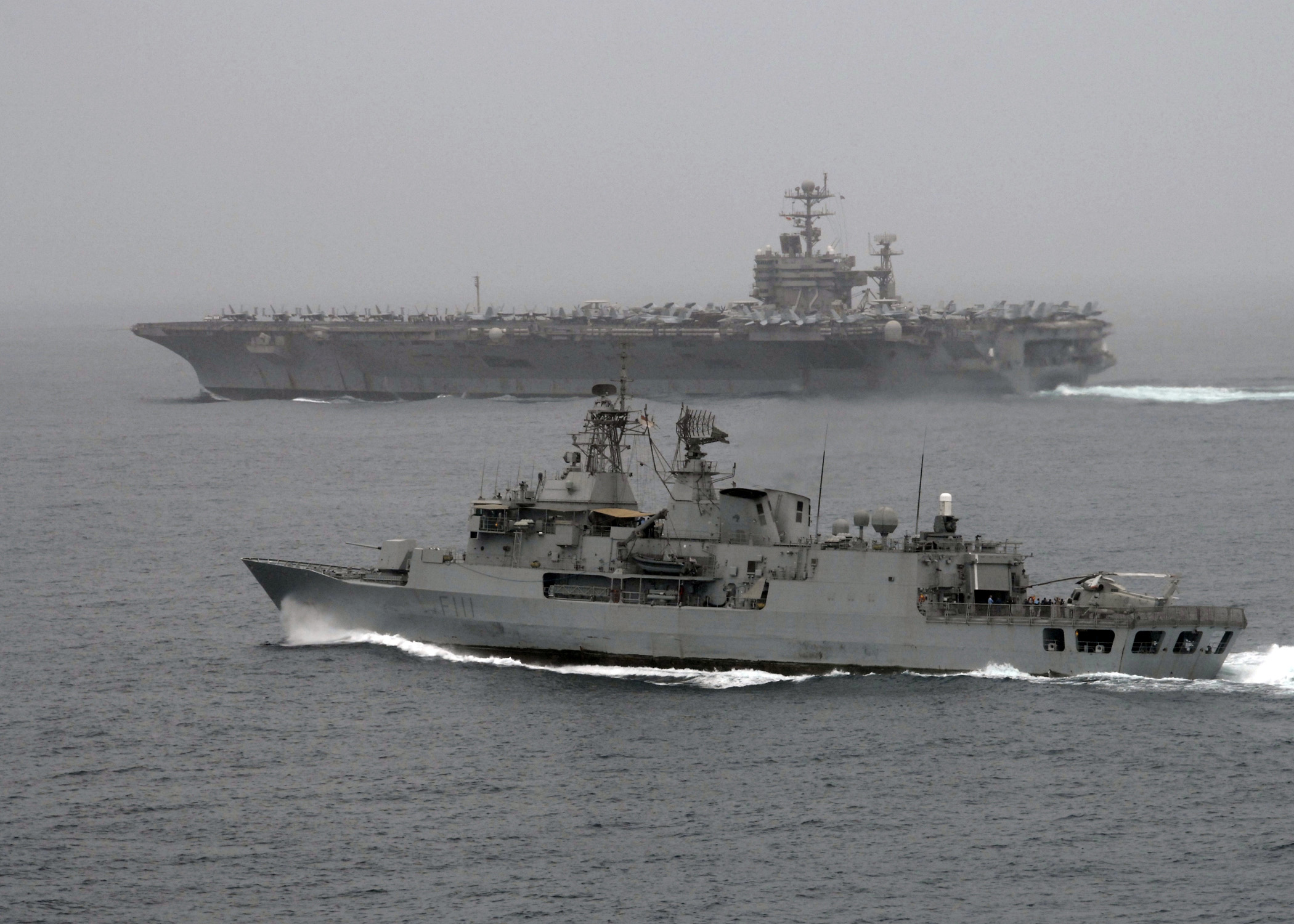
The Royal New Zealand Navy frigate HMNZS Te Mana operates as part of Task Force 150 in the north Arabian Sea

After the September 11 terrorist attacks, the New Zealand Special Air Service was deployed to Afghanistan, and made several deployments afterwards. Later, New Zealand sent troops to relieve U.S. forces in one of the many Provincial Reconstruction Teams, this one in Bamyan Province. The Provincial Reconstruction Team (New Zealand) was deployed until 2013.

New Zealand Prime Minister Helen Clark announced in April 2008 that there would be additional troops sent to the Provincial Reconstruction Team (PRT) in Banyan Province, because of concern over the deteriorating situation in Afghanistan. In 2004 Lance Corporal Willie Apiata of the Special Air Service carried a wounded teammate to safety, earning the Victoria Cross for New Zealand for bravery under fire. He and three other SAS soldiers received bravery awards for actions during the same mission in July 2007. Two soldiers received the New Zealand Gallantry Decoration and one the New Zealand Gallantry Medal. New Zealand C-130 Hercules and Boeing 757 transport aircraft made constant trips to the region. ANZAC class frigates of the Royal New Zealand Navy made several deployments to the Indian Ocean/United States Fifth Fleet area.

In November 2007, a nephew of New Zealand's Minister of Defence Phil Goff died in Afghanistan; he was United States Army Captain Matthew Ferrara, who held both American and New Zealand citizenship. In July 2008, the sixth Australian soldier died in Afghanistan, New Zealand-born SAS Signaller Sean McCarthy.

The decision was made in August 2009 that NZSAS troops would be sent back to Afghanistan.

In November 2009, the Government of New Zealand was working on an exit plan to pull all New Zealand troops out of Afghanistan.

== Norway ==
Norwegian SOF, commanded by ISAF, was in Afghanistan from 2001 to 2021.

In 2002, a tri-national detachment known as the European Participating Air Forces of 18 Danish, Dutch and Norwegian F-16 ground attack fighters aircraft was deployed to Manas International Airport in Kyrgyzstan to support operations in Afghanistan. Norway contributed four to six F-16s. Also deployed from Norway were logistic teams, mine clearance teams, special forces groups (from HJK and MJK) and several C-130 transport aircraft. Norway also has an army training base located in Afghanistan. Currently, they have lost one soldier in an RPG attack and one special forces lieutenant in a shoot-out with hostile gunmen. Norway has also lost six soldiers in bomb attacks, including four KJKs in the same attack. Norway redeployed F-16 ground attack aircraft in 2006 as part of a joint Dutch-Norwegian unit supporting expanded NATO operations in Afghanistan. Currently Norway has a little more than 500 soldiers stationed in Afghanistan, mainly in the North and in Kabul.

== Oman ==
Oman offered the United States and allies use of its airspace and air bases.

== Pakistan ==
Pakistan had helped in the war against the Taliban. Pakistan agreed to open borders to receive the expected increased migration of refugees from Afghanistan. Earlier, Pakistan had supported the Taliban, especially during the 1996–2001 period when they were establishing control – later relations between the two were not as close. After the 9/11 attacks, Pakistan allocated three airbases to the United States for the invasion of Afghanistan. The US depended on Pakistan for a route to Afghanistan to supply the ISAF forces more than any source.

== Poland ==
A 40-man JW GROM element deployed to Afghanistan in early 2002, in 2007 both Grom and JW Komandosów were deployed to Kandahar (after earlier successful tours of Iraq operating alongside US Navy SEALs) under direct US Command. They weren't restricted by any national caveats-the only restriction placed on them was regarding cross-border operations into Pakistan. Along with Direct Action successes, they were considered very effective in training and mentoring Afghan National Police units.

Poland had approximately 2,500 troops, mainly from Wojska Lądowe, and 10 helicopters stationed primarily in Ghazni province. There is also Wojska Specjalne compound: JW Grom (ISAF SOF TF-49), JW Komandosów (ISAF SOF TF-50) (Ghazni prov. Paktika prov.), JW Nil & HHD. Poland has also provided combat engineers and logistical support.

== Portugal ==
Portugal deployed 145 soldiers to Afghanistan, and provided a detachment of C-130 Hercules cargo planes. As a NATO member, Portugal supported the invocation of Article V.

== Qatar ==
Qatar offered the United States and allies use of the Al Udeid Airbase.

== Romania ==
40 operators from the 1st Special Operations Battalion "Eagles" were deployed to Afghanistan in 2006 under the direct command of OEF-A, they transitioned to ISAF command the following year and were heavily involved in mentoring Afghan National Army units. The Romanian commitment eventually grew to a full Special Operations Task Group comprising three ODA (Operational Detachment Alphas)-sized elements. They often operated closely with US Army Special Forces ODAs on joint patrols and mixed ODAs of American and Romanian operators.

1,843 Force consisted of a battalion in Qalat, Zabul Province. Additionally, a special forces squad (39 personnel) operated from Tagab in Kapisa Province, and a training detachment of 47 personnel is in Kabul.

== Russia ==
Russia provided a field hospital as well as a hospital in Kabul for allies and Afghan civilians. Russia has also agreed to provide logistic support for the United States forces in Afghanistan to aid in anti-terrorist operations. Russia allowed US and NATO forces to pass through its territory to go to Afghanistan. Russian Special Forces also assisted US and Afghan forces in operations in Afghanistan, by helping with intel and studying the lay of the land.

== Slovakia ==
Slovakia provided sappers and specialists on maintenance and reconstruction of airports and technical equipment for such operations.

== Slovenia ==
Slovenia deployed from 60 to 90 troops in Afghanistan and several IFVs (Infantry fighting vehicles) and armoured transport vehicles, and it considered the possibility of deploying three attack helicopters.

== South Korea ==
South Korea provided logistical support and a field hospital.

== Spain ==
As a NATO member, Spain supported the invocation of Article V of the NATO charter. Spain made available Spanish military bases for military operations. Spanish forces have since supported the ISAF mission with about 2,500 combat troops in Afghanistan plus a helicopter detachment and 3 C-130 Hercules aircraft.

== Sudan ==
Sudan offered heavy and lightweight logistic support.

== Sweden ==
Sweden was in Afghanistan since 2002 and had 900 soldiers there (February 2012). These troops are however NOT part of OEF, but were under the lead of ISAF. Sweden lead the PRT Mazari Sharif

== Switzerland ==
Switzerland deployed 31 soldiers to Afghanistan in 2003, and two Swiss officers had worked with German troops. Swiss forces were withdrawn in February 2008.

== Tajikistan ==
Tajikistan provided use of its airspace, airbases and facilities for humanitarian aid.

== Thailand ==
Thailand offered the United States and its allies a fueling station for aircraft and provided logistical support.

== Turkey ==
Turkey offered the United States use of its airspace and air refuelling for US aircraft deploying to the region. Turkey would later deploy troops to Afghanistan as part of ISAF.

Turkey also provided logistical support.

== Turkmenistan ==
Turkmenistan offered the use of its airspace.

== United Arab Emirates ==
The United Arab Emirates provided 3 security personnel. Special Forces are also in Afghanistan (Wikileaks) and Al Minhad Air Base is a support hub for Australia, New Zealand, and previously Canadian air forces.

== Ukraine ==
Ukraine allowed use of its airspace and airbases to the US and its allies, but only for cargo flights. Ukraine was a participant in the NATO-led International Security Assistance Force in Afghanistan and deployed troops as part of NATO's ISAF mission to the country. It contributed medical personnel supporting Provincial Reconstruction Teams, and provided instructors for NATO's Training Mission. After ISAF's mission ended in 2014, Ukraine supported the follow-on Resolute Support Mission (2015-2021) that trained, advised and assisted Afghan security forces.

== United Kingdom ==
The United Kingdom deployed sea, air and land assets for the invasion against the Taliban/al-Qaeda in 2001, designated Operation Veritas. The naval element consisted of one Invincible-class aircraft carrier, one amphibious ship, one destroyer, one frigate, three nuclear fleet submarines and seven Royal Fleet Auxiliaries. The submarines HMS Trafalgar and HMS Triumph launched Tomahawk missiles on targets inside Afghanistan. Special Boat Service and Special Air Service special forces also deployed. Later 45 Commando, Royal Marines deployed as part of Operation Jacana. The Royal Air Force contributed Lockheed L-1011 TriStar and Vickers VC10 tanker aircraft, Boeing E-3 Sentry surveillance and control aircraft, Hawker Siddeley Nimrod surveillance aircraft, Nimrod MR2 maritime reconnaissance aircraft, English Electric Canberra reconnaissance aircraft, Lockheed C-130 Hercules air transport aircraft and Boeing Chinook helicopters from 27 Squadron. A total of 453 members of the British Armed Forces have died during OEF (see British forces casualties in Afghanistan).

Since initial deployments supporting OEF, British forces took part in the ISAF mission, whilst British special forces worked with both OEF and ISAF. In January 2006, Defence Secretary John Reid announced the UK would send a PRT with several thousand personnel to Helmand for at least three years. This had been planned as part of the gradual expansion of ISAF's area of responsibility from the Kabul region to the rest of Afghanistan. An initial strength of 5,700 personnel in Afghanistan was planned, which would stabilise to around 4,500 for the rest of the deployment.

== United States ==
In 2002, there were approximately 7,000 troops in Afghanistan, including United States Army Rangers, troops from the 10th Mountain Division, 187th Infantry Regt. "Rakkasans" 101st Airborne Division (Air Assault), 82nd Airborne and the United States Marine Corps. Marines of the 15th Marine Expeditionary Unit and 26th Marine Expeditionary Unit were among the first forces to begin the United States invasion of Afghanistan in September 2001. 1st Battalion, 87th Infantry Regiment, 10th Mountain Division deployed elements assisting special forces on 25 or 26 Nov at Mazaar Sharif and securing Bagram airfield from British special forces. Counter-IED Analysis Team worked in Improvised Explosive Device-detection technologies, and general regional intelligence gathering and networking protocols for support teams.

The United States Navy aircraft carrier USS Enterprise with an eight-ship and submarine task group, followed by USS Carl Vinson with nine other ships and submarines, deployed for operations over Afghanistan at different stages to the end of 2002. USS Theodore Roosevelt with an 11-ship and submarine task group also deployed. Additionally, USS George Washington was deployed from 20 June 2002 until 20 December 2002 in support of Operation Southern Watch, and Operation Enduring Freedom.

Roughly 150 aircraft were initially deployed for the initial bombing waves, including some two dozen Boeing B-52 bombers and support aircraft.

In 2007, 23,000 American troops were in Afghanistan, in the OEF-A. Other US troops were deployed as part of ISAF.

== Uzbekistan ==
Uzbekistan had allowed the US to place troops on the ground as well as use the Uzbek airbase, K2, for support activities and for deployment and command and control of Special Forces into all of Afghanistan except for the Kandahar region. K2 is no longer in use by the US.

== See also ==
- Civilian casualties of the war in Afghanistan (2001–present)
- Protests against the invasion of Afghanistan
- Canadian Afghan detainee abuse scandal
- Coalition casualties in Afghanistan
- British forces casualties in Afghanistan
- Canadian Forces casualties in Afghanistan
- German Armed Forces casualties in Afghanistan
- War in Afghanistan (2001–2021)
- Criticism of the war on terrorism
