= Qargha =

Town in Kabul Province of Afghanistan

Qargha قرغه
- City district
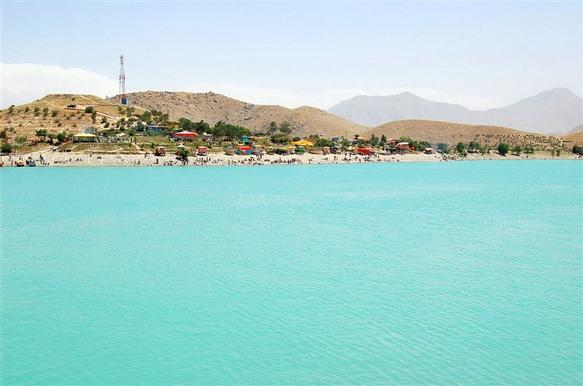
- The reservoir of Qargha Dam in 2007
- Interactive map of Qargha
- Country: Afghanistan
- Province: Kabul
- District: Kabul
- Time zone: UTC+04:30 (Afghanistan Time)

Qargha (Pashto: قرغې; Dari: قرغه) is a major recreation area located in the northwestern part of Kabul, Afghanistan. It is within the city's 14th district and serves as a special place where people go for leisure and entertainment purposes. Its main attraction is the Qargha Dam, which is named after the area. There are also parks, amusement rides, boat rides, horse rides, and many Afghan restaurants with open lounge areas.

Located east of the town sits the former Camp Qargha of the larger National Military Academy of Afghanistan, this was later converted to a drug rehabilitation centre. A few miles to the northwest is Paghman. Both towns attract many local and foreign tourists, especially during public holidays.

== Major security-related incidents in the area ==
On 27 August 1986, there were large explosions in an army ammunition depot in the town, with flames that rose more than 1,000 feet high. This was during the Soviet–Afghan War, which ended on 15 February 1989.

On 22 June 2012, twenty people including security personnel were killed in the area during a terrorist attack.

On 23 August 2014, a gang of criminals pretending to be police raped four women on the main Paghman-Qargha road. Five of the criminals were later executed by hanging after being convicted.

== See also ==
- Fauna of Afghanistan
- List of protected areas of Afghanistan
- Tourism in Afghanistan
