= FMIC =

FMIC may refer to:

- Front mounted intercooler, a type of intercooler
- Fender Musical Instruments Corporation
- French Medical Institute for Children, Kabul, Afghanistan
