= Jamhuriat Hospital =

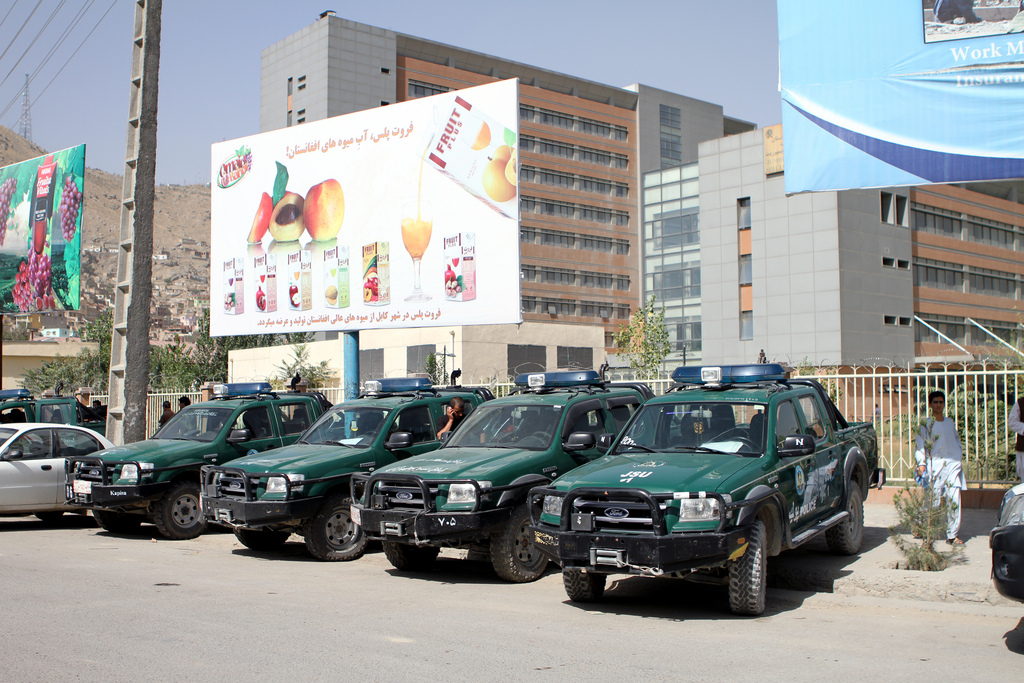
- Buildings of the Jamhuriat Hospital behind the Afghan National Police vehicles

Geography
- Location: District 2, Kabul, Kabul Province, Afghanistan

Organisation
- Network: Agha Khan Network; Bayat Foundation

Services
- Emergency department: Yes
- Beds: 350

Helipads
- Helipad: No

History
- Founded: 2006

The Jamhuriat Hospital is a state-owned hospital in Kabul, Afghanistan. It is located in the city's busy District 2, to south of Shahr-e Naw and southwest of Wazir Akbar Khan neighborhoods. Nearby notable places include the Arg, Abdul Rahman Mosque, Gulbahar Plaza, and Joy-Shir. The hospital consists of a 4-story building and a 10-story building with the capacity of housing 350 patients. It was constructed in 2004 by workers from China and Afghanistan.

The Jamuriat Hospital has a special pediatric oncology department, which was recently established by the Bayat Foundation. In October 2023, the Afghan Ministry of Public Health announced that the hospital will soon see a major renovation, and that some services of the hospital are to be shifted to the Jinnah Hospital in Dashte Barchi.

== See also ==
- List of hospitals in Afghanistan
