= Maidan Shar =

City in Wardak province, Afghanistan

Maidan Shar میدان شهر
- Provincial capital
- Location in Afghanistan
- Coordinates: 34°23′50″N 68°52′11″E
- Country: Afghanistan
- Province: Maidan Wardak
- District: Maidan Shar

Government
  - Type: Municipality
  - Mayor: Mawlavi Abdullah Darwish

Area
  - Land: 33 km^{2} (13 sq mi)
- Elevation: 2,225 m (7,300 ft)

Population (2025)
  - Provincial capital: 50,029
  - Density: 1,500/km^{2} (3,900/sq mi)
  - Urban: 3,984
  - Rural: 46,045
- Time zone: UTC+04:30 (Afghanistan Time)
- ISO 3166 code: AF-MSR

Maidan Shar or Maidan Shahr (Pashto: (Note: Pashto pronunciation: [maɪ.d̪ɑn ʂɑɾ, maɪ.dɑn ʃɑɾ, maɪ.d̪ɑn çɑɾ, maɪ.d̪ɑn xɑɾ]) میدان شهر; Dari: (Note: Dari pronunciation: [mäj.d̪ɑːn ʃɑːɾ, mäj.d̪ɑːn ʃäɦɾ]) میدان شهر) is a growing town in the eastern part of Afghanistan, serving as the capital of Maidan Wardak Province. It is within the jurisdiction of Maidan Shar District and has an estimated population of 50,029 people. Mawlavi Abdullah Darwish is the current mayor of the town.

Maidan Shar is connected by a road network with Kabul to the northeast, Bamyan and Behsud to the west, and Ghazni to the southwest. The Kabul–Kandahar Highway passes in the town, which helps its economy. Maidan Shar currently has a limited number of bazaars, restaurants, hotels, mosques, hospitals, and places to play sports or just relax.

Zarifa Ghafari became Maidan Shar's first female mayor in 2019. At the age of 26, she was one of the youngest to be appointed. She has won awards for her efforts in promoting women's rights in Afghanistan. On or about 15 August 2021, Maidan Shar fell to the Taliban, becoming the twenty-seventh provincial capital to be captured by the Taliban as part of their wider 2021 offensive.

== Geography ==
Maidan Shar is at a strategic location, which connects by road Kabul with Bamyan and Ghazni. It is within the larger Maidan Shar District and sits at an elevation of approximately 2,225 m (7,300 ft) above sea level. The town is located in the northeastern part of Wardak Province. It is surrounded by the Arghandeh and Paghman mountains of Kabul Province, and the Jalrez and Nirkh districts of Wardak Province. It consists of 59 main villages and 1 sub-village.

Maidan Shar is described as an urban village located 40 km (25 mi) west of Kabul. It has 4 city districts (nahias), covering a land area of 33 km^{2} (13 sq mi) or 3,347 ha (8,270 acres). Majority of the land is not occupied or utilized, with barren land and vacant plots combining for about 81% of total land use. Institutional land is the second largest built-up land use (22%). Residential dwellings are concentrated in Districts 1 and 2.

=== Climate ===
Maidan Shar features a warm-summer humid continental climate (Dsb) under the Köppen climate classification. It has warm, dry summers and cold, snowy winters. The average temperature in Maidan Shar is 7.6 °C (45.7 °F), while the annual precipitation averages 558 mm (22.0 in).

July is the warmest month of the year, with an average temperature of 20.8 °C (69.4 °F). The coldest month, January, has an average temperature of −7.4 °C (18.7 °F).

Climate data for Maidan Shar
| Month | Jan | Feb | Mar | Apr | May | Jun | Jul | Aug | Sep | Oct | Nov | Dec | Year |
|---|---|---|---|---|---|---|---|---|---|---|---|---|---|
| Mean daily maximum °C (°F) | −1.3 (29.7) | −0.9 (30.4) | 6.4 (43.5) | 14.7 (58.5) | 20.6 (69.1) | 25.3 (77.5) | 28.3 (82.9) | 27.2 (81.0) | 23.3 (73.9) | 17.0 (62.6) | 9.1 (48.4) | 2.9 (37.2) | 14.4 (57.9) |
| Daily mean °C (°F) | −7.4 (18.7) | −6.3 (20.7) | 0.6 (33.1) | 8.5 (47.3) | 14.3 (57.7) | 18.7 (65.7) | 21.6 (70.9) | 20.6 (69.1) | 16.6 (61.9) | 10.6 (51.1) | 3.0 (37.4) | −3.6 (25.5) | 8.1 (46.6) |
| Mean daily minimum °C (°F) | −13.5 (7.7) | −12.0 (10.4) | −5.9 (21.4) | 0.9 (33.6) | 6.2 (43.2) | 9.9 (49.8) | 13.2 (55.8) | 12.8 (55.0) | 8.6 (47.5) | 3.1 (37.6) | −3.3 (26.1) | −9.6 (14.7) | 0.9 (33.6) |
| Average precipitation mm (inches) | 53 (2.1) | 72 (2.8) | 78 (3.1) | 88 (3.5) | 98 (3.9) | 37 (1.5) | 16 (0.6) | 13 (0.5) | 15 (0.6) | 22 (0.9) | 32 (1.3) | 34 (1.3) | 558 (22.1) |
| Average precipitation days | 6 | 6 | 7 | 9 | 12 | 6 | 2 | 2 | 2 | 4 | 4 | 4 | 64 |
| Average relative humidity (%) | 50 | 56 | 57 | 62 | 43 | 31 | 27 | 30 | 29 | 35 | 46 | 45 | 43 |
| Mean daily sunshine hours | 7.2 | 7.4 | 8.9 | 10.1 | 11.6 | 12.7 | 12.6 | 11.9 | 11.0 | 9.9 | 8.2 | 7.7 | 9.9 |
Source: Climate-Data.org

== Demographics ==
Maidan Shar has an estimated population of 50,029 people. Ethnically, they are predominantly Pashtuns followed by Tajiks and Hazaras. In 2015 there were 1,585 dwelling units in the city. This number has nearly doubled by 2026.

== Economy ==
The economy of Maidan Shar is mostly based on agriculture, trade, and transport.

== Education ==
There are a number of public and private schools in Maidan Shar. About a decade ago there were a total of 14 schools, with about 275 teachers and 9,268 students.

== Healthcare ==
There are a limited number of hospitals and clinics in Maidan Shar. Residents of the area that seek advanced medical care go to Kabul.

== Sports ==
Cricket and football are the most popular sports in Afghanistan. Other sports Maidan Shar's people enjoy playing are futsal and volleyball.

== See also ==
- List of cities in Afghanistan

== Notable people ==
- Hanif Baktash, poet and writer
- Zarifa Ghafari, former mayor
