= Hanif Baktash =

Afghan poet (1961–2012)

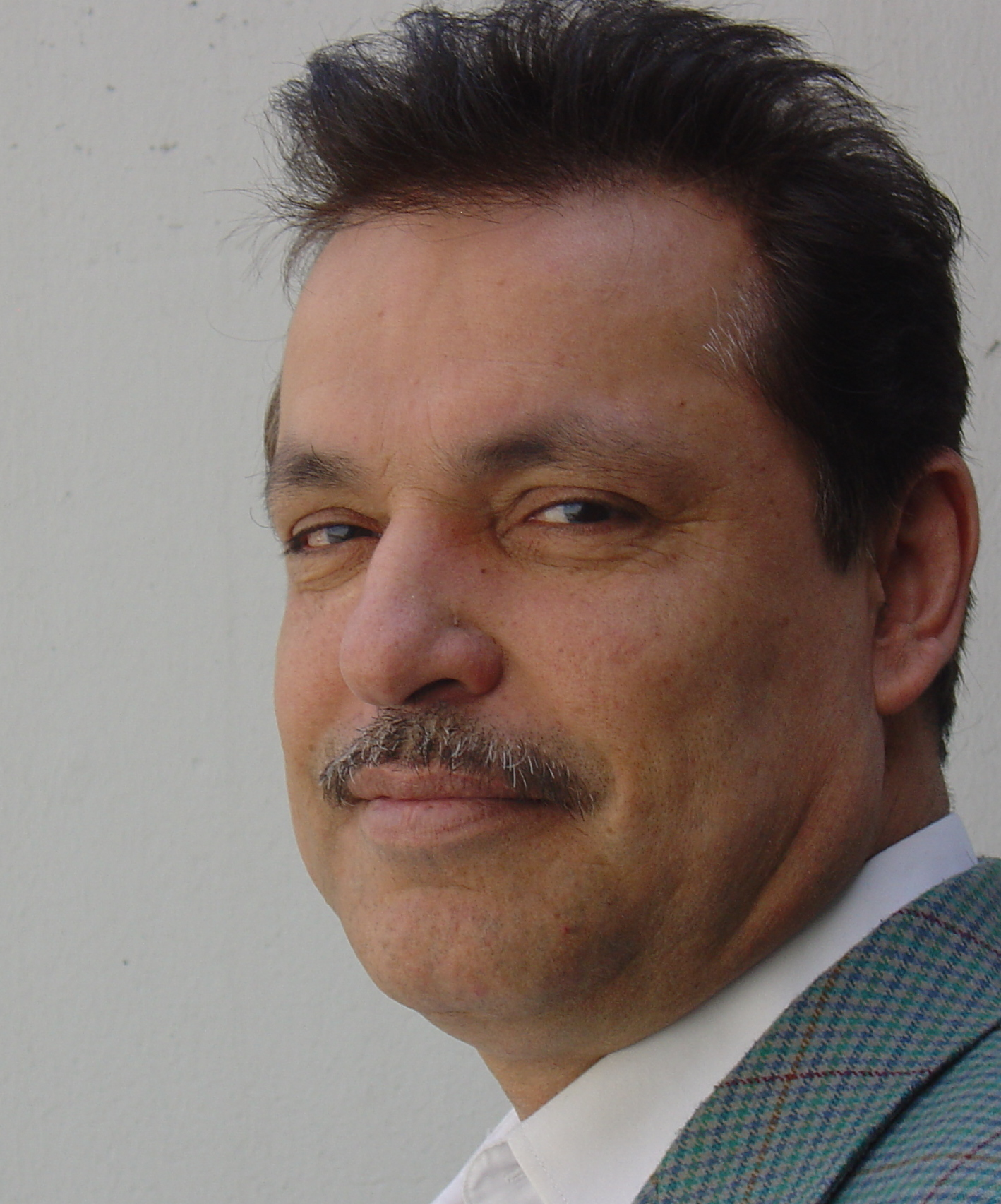
M. Hanif Baktash in 2010

Hanif Baktash (Pashto: ډاکټر حنیف بکتاش, IPA: [haˈnif bakˈtɑʃ]; 9 May 1961 – 2012) was a Pashto-language poet and writer.

== Early life ==
Mohamad Hanif Baktash, an ethnic Pashtun of the Amarkhel tribe, was born on 9 May 1961, in Maidan Shar, Afghanistan.

He started his studies in Mazar-i-Sharif and continued in Maidan Shar, Kandahar, Helmand and finished Habibia High School, Kabul in 1978. He earned a graduate degree in social science from the Kabul Institute of Pedagogy. He received a Ph.D. diploma in History from the Supreme Attestation Commission of the USSR in 1993 for his thesis "War in Afghanistan: Social – Political Reasons and Consequences".

Career

In the summer of 1993 he moved to London and became a British citizen in 2002. He worked as a journalist with the BBC in 1998 and 1999. In 2009 he began working as a consultant for Afghanistan at a consultancy in Hamburg, Germany. Baktash was fluent in Pashto, Dari, English, and Russian.

== Personal life ==
He married Meena Baktash. Together, they had two sons.

Hanif Baktash died in 2012.

== Works ==
In 1976 Baktash won a Pashto poetry prize in Afghanistan that opened his way into Afghan media. His main books include:

- یادداشت هاونوشته ها (1984), analytical research in Dari
- دځنګله سترګوکې (1987)
- کله چې لمردخدای ایتونه لولي (2009)
- شعرې که خنجر است (1983)
- صدا (1984)
