= Blue Mosque, Kabul =

Mosque in Kabul, Afghanistan

Blue Mosque
- زیارت سخی
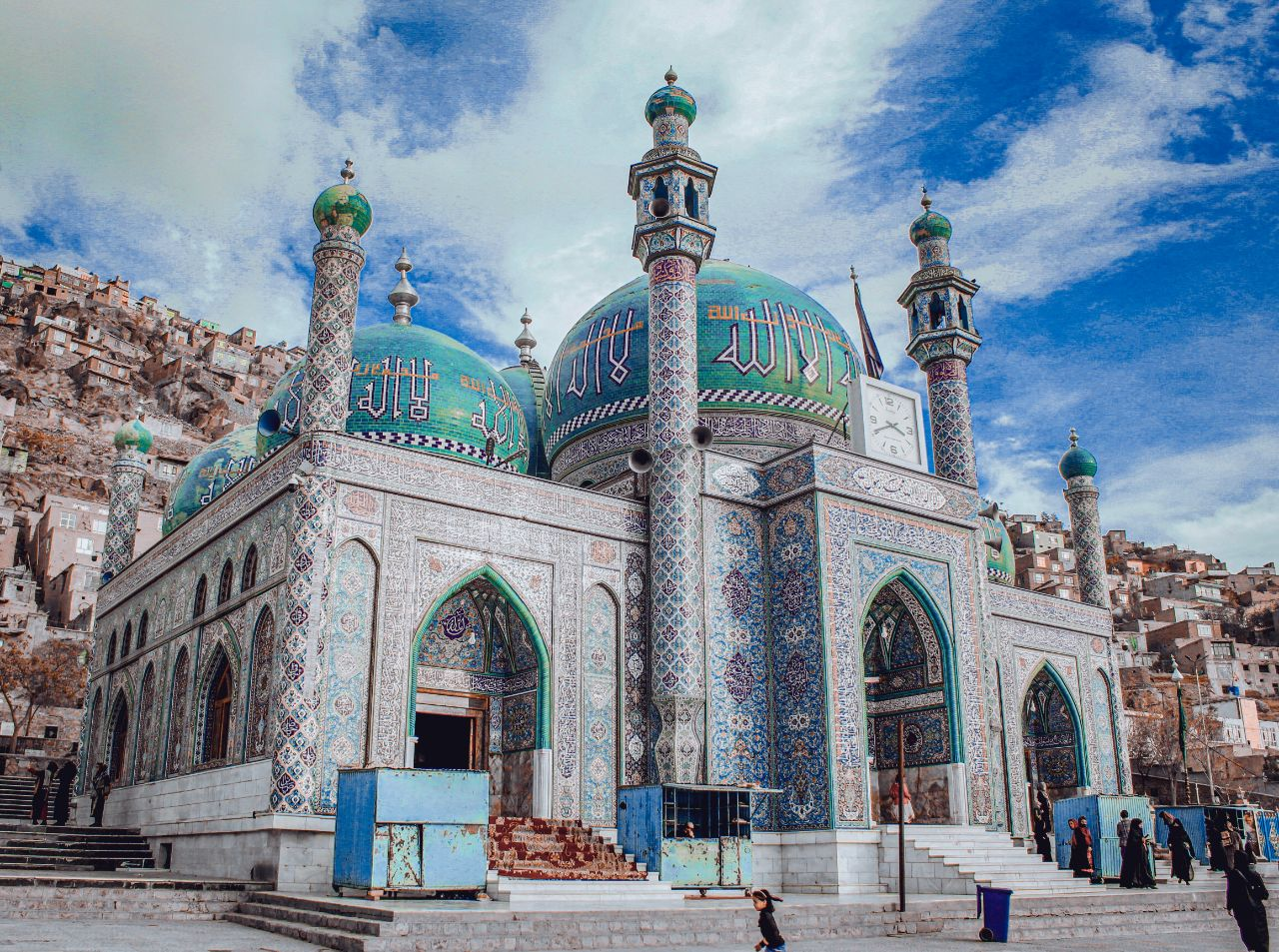
- The mosque and shrine in 2023

- Location of the mosque in Afghanistan

Religion
- Affiliation: Islam
- Festival: Nowruz
- Ecclesiastical or organisational status: Mosque and shrine
- Status: Active

Location
- Location: Karte Sakhi area, Kabul
- Country: Afghanistan
- Interactive map of Blue Mosque
- Coordinates: 34°31′12″N 69°08′48″E

Architecture
- Style: Safavid
- Completed: c. 17th century CE

Specifications
- Dome: Six
- Minaret: Four (maybe more)

The Blue Mosque, also known as the Sakhi Shah-e Mardan Shrine or Ziyarat-e Sakhi (Pashto/Dari: زیارت سخی, romanized: Sakhi Shrine), is a mosque and shrine complex, located in the Karte Sakhi area of Kabul, Afghanistan. It is associated with the place to which the cloak of the Islamic prophet Muhammad was brought and with a visit from Ali, the son-in-law and cousin of Muhammad, who would later serve as Caliph himself. The shrine is located at the foot of the Asamayi Hill, now better known as Television Hill. To its north and west is the Sakhi Cemetery.

== Design ==
The shrine is decorated with glazed tiles in a neo-Safavid Persian style. The building bears many inscriptions, including dedicatory texts, Qurʾanic excerpts, prayers, Hadith, and poetry.

== History and legend ==
It is believed that the shrine marks the spot where the cloak of Muhammad was kept on its way to its present location in the Shrine of the Cloak in Kandahar. The cloak is said to have been woven by Muhammad himself with the help of his daughter Fatima, her husband, and Muhammad's cousin, Ali, and their sons, Hasan and Husayn. Before Muhammad died, he bequeathed his cloak to Uwais al-Qarani, telling Ali and Umar that Uwais should be given the cloak on his death. After the Muhammad's death, Uwais took the cloak to the Cave of Hira on Jabal al-Nour, where Muhammad received his first revelation. It is believed to have remained in the cave until it was taken to Baghdad by Shaykh al-Uliya Qutba al-Atqiya. Timur would later seize it and take to his capital of Samarqand, where is would stay until 1076 AH (1665/1666 CE). The cloak was then taken to India, from where it was taken to Balkh, in the west of today's Afghanistan, by the then governor of the city, Mir Yar Beg. He built a fort in Juzgun, Badakhshan, to house the garment securely. Following the move of the cloak to Juzgun, the settlement became known as Fayzabad. The cloak would remain there for seventy-nine years.

The interior of Kabul's Sakhi Shah-e Mardan. Behind the glass wall is the female section

In 1181 AH (1767/1768 CE), Ahmad Shah Durrani decided to move the cloak to his capital of Kandahar. He entrusted the move to Shah Wali Khan E'temad al-Dawla. The cloak was taken on its journey by a group of the most pious men. Kabul was on the route south from Fayzabad, and it was near the edge of the town that the group stopped to rest and allow local people to view the cloak. One day, the men carrying the cloak noticed a man wearing green praying by it. On the third night, they dreamt that the man in green came to see the cloak once more. When he removed his sword from its sheath and placed it on a nearby rock they noticed that its blade had a double tip. They recognised the sword as Zulfiqar and its owner as Imam Ali. The rock on which Ali is believed to have placed his sword is now encompassed by the shrine building. When the men awoke, they knew that a shrine should be built on this spot. Ahmad Shah patronised the building of the first structure, with one dome over the rock. The cloak remained here for eight months, before continuing its journey south to Kandahar, where it remains today. It was notably brought out of its shrine and worn by Mullah Omar in 1996.

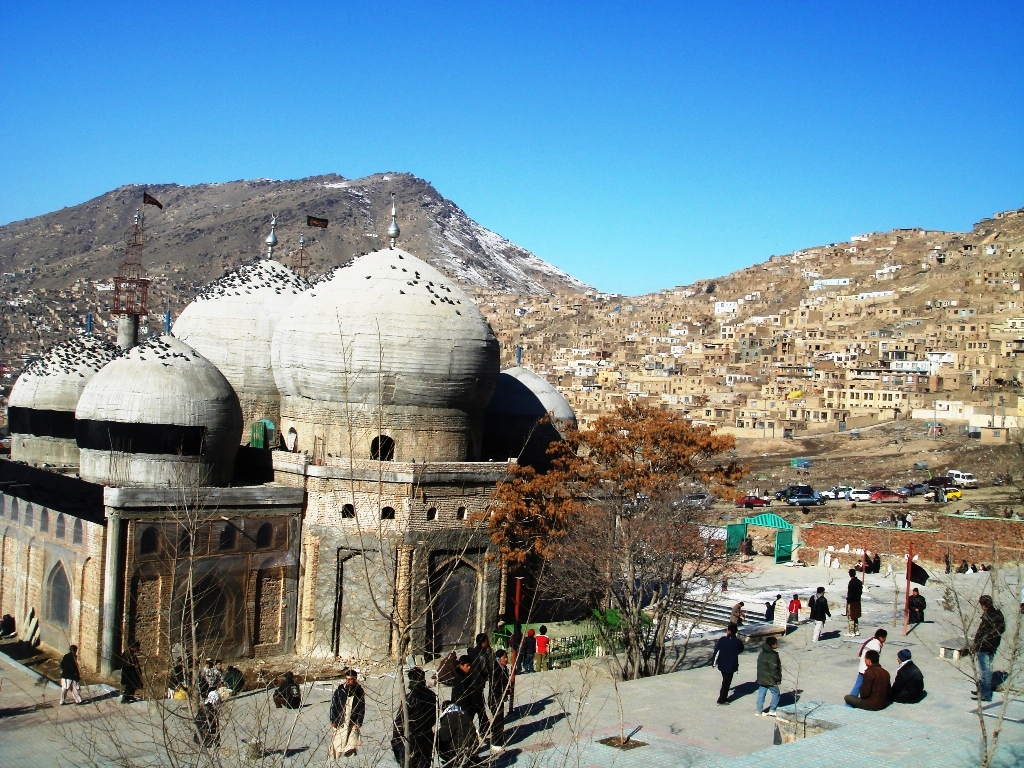
Back of the shrine before restoration

A second dome was added to the shrine by the mother of Amanullah Khan in 1919 CE. The four additional domes were added during renovations which took place between 2008 and 2016.

Every year, a popular Nowruz celebration is held outside the shrine, during which a large banner is raised in remembrance of Imam Ali, who was the standard-bearer of Muhammad.

A small underground shrine can be accessed from the women's side of the building. Cut into the bed rock, a tight staircase leads down to a small cavelike chamber were women now leave petitions and votive offerings. On the men's side, there is a hand-print relic.

The shrine is visited mainly by Hazaras, a Shiʿi community. Largely due to this, the shrine has been victim to a number of significant attacks, including the March 2018 Kabul suicide bombing. In late 2021, journalists from The New York Times embedded with a six-man Taliban unit tasked with protecting the shrine from the Islamic State, noting "how seriously the men appeared to take their assignment."

== See also ==
- Islam in Afghanistan
- List of mosques in Afghanistan
