= Chaman-e-Hozori =

Park in Kabul, Afghanistan

- چمن حضوری
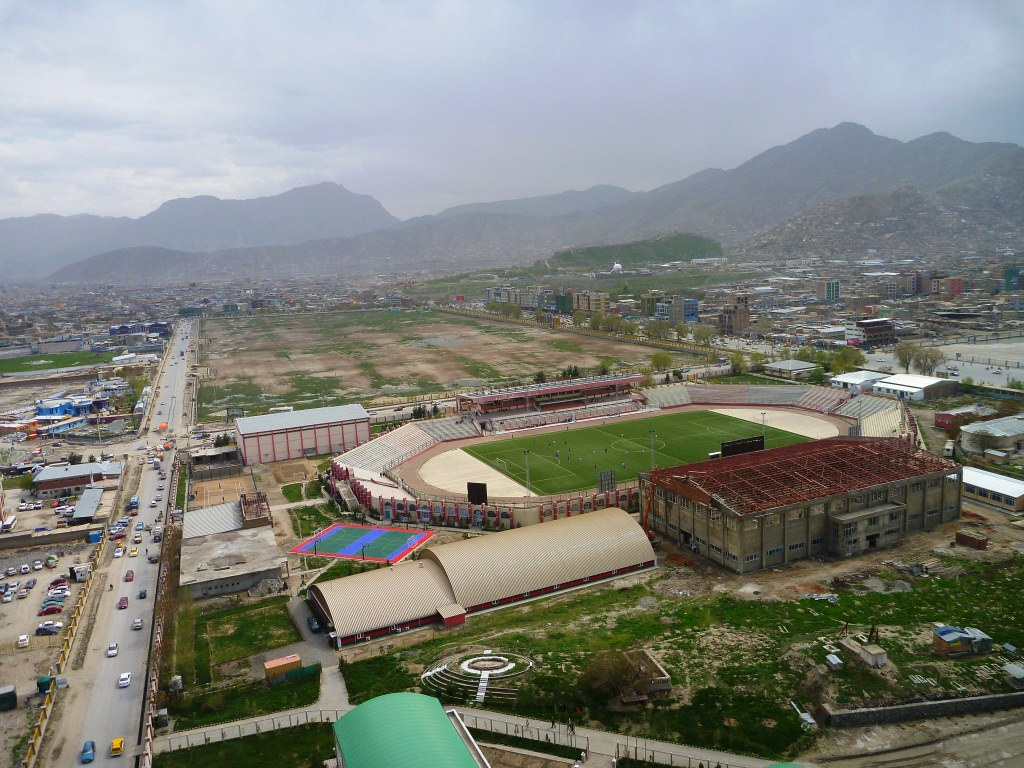
- Chaman Hozori park beyond the Ghazi Stadium (view from the north) Location in Kabul
- Location: Kabul, Afghanistan
- Status: Active

Chaman-i Hazouri (Dari: چمن حضوری) or Hazoori Chaman (Pashto: حضوري چمن) is a park in downtown Kabul, Afghanistan. It is the site of the famous Chaman Hazouri hoard (or Kabul hoard) of ancient coins and jewellery dating back to the Achaemenid Empire (c.550–330 BCE), which is of key interest to the historians.

== Description ==
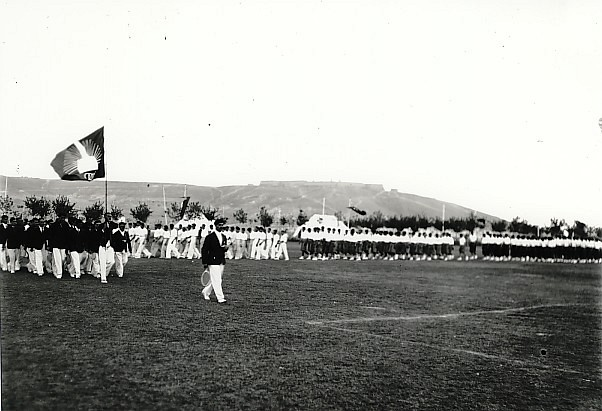
Parade of athletes in Chaman-e-Hozori, following the flag of the Afghanistan National Olympic Committee in the 1930s

Chaman Hozori park lies at the foot of the Tepe Maranjan hill, close to the Kabul River passing through the Kabul city centre. The Ghazi Stadium is immediately to the north of the park. The park is currently used as a meeting place and parade ground, especially during the Republic Day (Jeshn-i-Jamhuriat) celebrations around 17 July. During the reign of Amir Habibullah (1901–1919), the area was used as a golf course.

The park was also referred to as "Jeshyn grounds" due to the celebration of annual independence day celebrations there. For the 1956 Jeshyn fair, which was billed as "international", the Soviet Union and the United States vied with each other for creating their exhibitions. R. Buckminster Fuller was commissioned to design a geodesic dome for the US exhibition, which was manufactured in North Carolina and flown to Kabul so that it could be assembled by local Afghan workers within two days.

== Chaman Hozori hoard ==
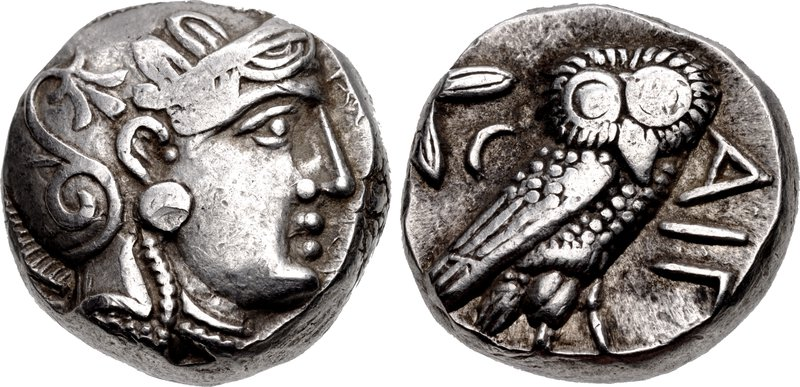
A 380 BCE Iranian imitation of 6th century Athenian tetradrachm, minted under Achaemenid rule, included in the Kabul hoard.

In 1933, when foundations were being dug for a house close to the park, an ancient pot was discovered containing jewellery and around 1,000 coins. 127 coins and pieces of jewellery were taken to the Kabul Museum and others made their way to various museums in British India and elsewhere. Some two decades later, Daniel Schlumberger of Délégation Archéologique Française en Afghanistan (DAFA) published photographs and details of the finds stored in the Kabul Museum in a book titled Tresors Monetaire en Afghanistan.

The Chaman Hozori coins remained at the Kabul Museum until 1992–1993, at which time the Mujahideen fighting the Afghan civil war plundered the museum. All the coins were lost (along with various other artifacts). Some two years later, 14 coins from the collection surfaced in a private collection in Pakistan. Osmund Bopearachchi and Aman ur Rahman published their details in the book Pre-Kushana Coins in Pakistan (1995).

The Chaman Hozori hoard is of high interest to the historians because it contains a significant coin, an imitation of an Athenian tetradrachm, which can be dated approximately to 380 BCE. From this coin, the numismatists wer able to date the hoard and giving historical basis for all other finds in the hoard. In particular, numismatist Joe Cribb has postulated that the local coins found in the hoard are the earliest coins minted in South Asia and he traces the evolution of the coinage in the Indian subcontinent from this source.

== See also ==
- Shar-e Naw Park

== Bibliography ==
- Bopearachchi, Osmund (2000), "Coin Production and Circulation in Central Asia and North-West India (Before and after Alexander's Conquest)", Indologica Taurinensia, 25, International Association of Sanskrit Studies
- Cribb, J. (1985), "Dating India's Earliest Coins", in J. Schotsmans; M. Taddei (eds.), South Asian Archaeology, 1983: Proceedings from the Seventh International Conference of the Association of South Asian Archaeologistan in Westeren Europe Held in the Musees Royaux d'art et d'histoire, Brussels, Naples: Istituto Universario Orientale, pp. 535–554
