= Karte Sakhi =

Karte Sakhi کارته سخی
- Neighborhood of Kabul
- Country: Afghanistan
- Province: Kabul

Karte Sakhi (Dari: کارته سخی) is a neighbourhood in Afghanistan, located in Kabul.

== See also ==
- Sakhi Shrine
- March 2018 Kabul suicide bombing
