= Indira Gandhi Children's Hospital =

Geography
- Location: Wazkir Akbar Khan, Kabul, Afghanistan
- Coordinates: 34.538711°N 69.184997°E

Organisation
- Type: Children's hospital

Services
- Emergency department: Yes
- Beds: 300

Helipads
- Helipad: No

History
- Founded: 1969

Links
- Lists: Hospitals in Afghanistan

The Indira Gandhi Children's Hospital (IGICH) is one of the major children's hospitals in Afghanistan. It is located in the Wazir Akbar Khan neighborhood of Kabul, near the Ministry of Public Health. It is a public hospital established in 1969 with assistance from India. It was renamed in honor of Indira Gandhi in 1975. The hospital sometimes has to assign more than one child per bed due to high demand. In 2004, IGICH opened the first cerebral palsy center in Afghanistan.

Some Indian physicians working at the IGICH died in the February 2010 Kabul attack.

== See also ==
- List of hospitals in Afghanistan
