= Egyptian Field Hospital at Bagram =

Hospital in Afghanistan

- Egyptian Army
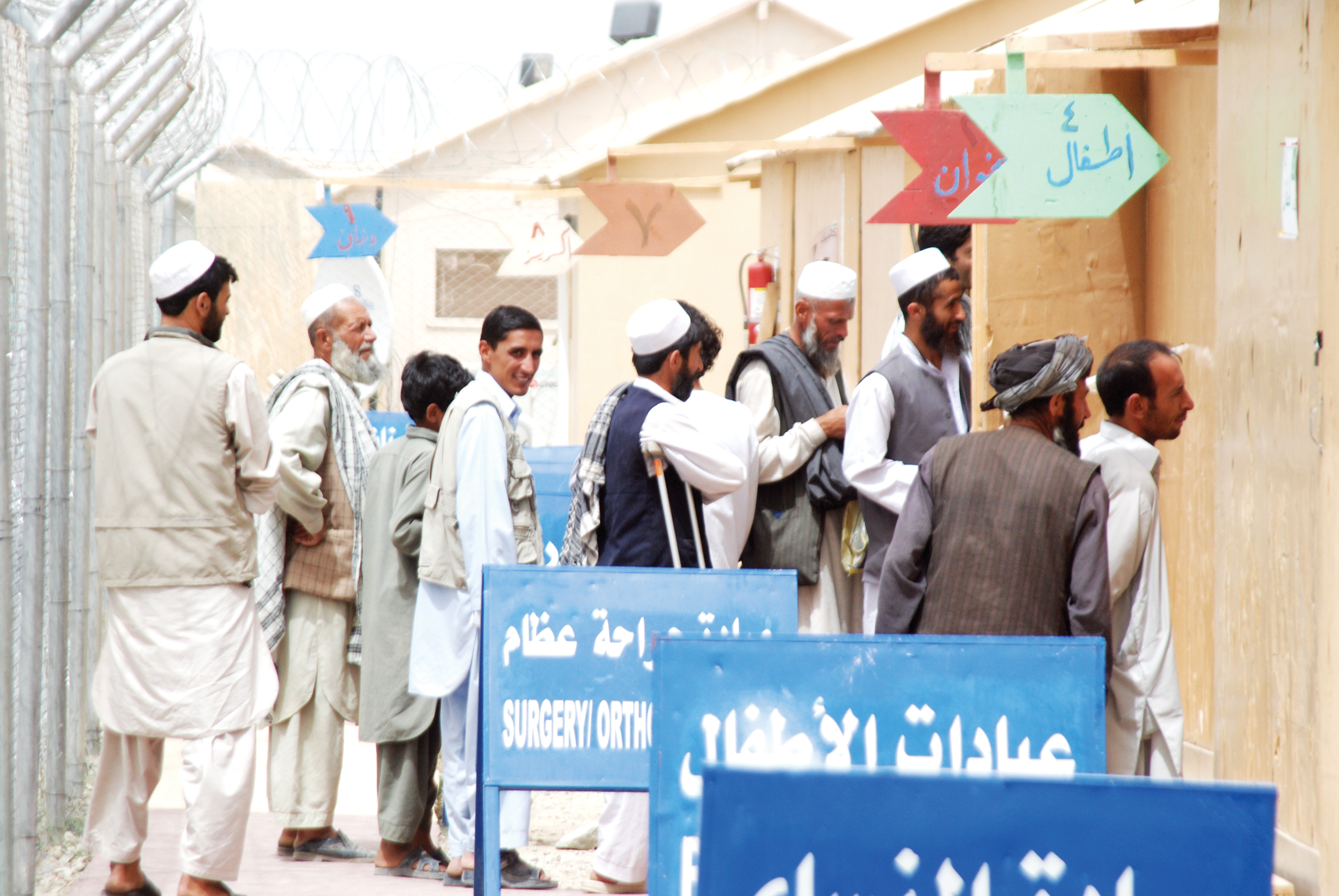
- Afghans wait in line outside of the Egyptian Field Hospital at Bagram Airfield

Geography
- Location: Bagram, Afghanistan
- Coordinates: 34.941372°N 69.256063°E

Organisation
- Type: Military hospital

History
- Founded: 2003
- Closed: 2013

Links
- Lists: Hospitals in Afghanistan

The Egyptian Field Hospital at Bagram was a military hospital operated by the Egyptian Army at Bagram Airfield, Afghanistan, from 2003 to 2013. As of 2008, the hospital treated between 400 and 500 Afghans weekly. Treatment was provided free of charge. 31 percent of the hospital's patients were children.

Liam Fox, writing in The Telegraph, described the Egyptian Hospital at Bagram as an exception to "almost non-existent" engagement in Afghanistan by the Muslim world.
