= Qargha Dam =

Dam in Kabul Province of Afghanistan

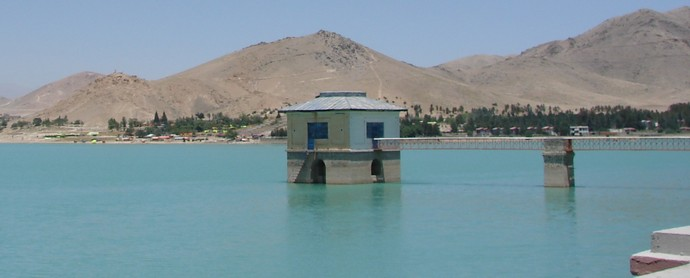
- The intake tower in 2007

- Location within Afghanistan
- Country: Afghanistan
- Location: Qargha, Kabul Province
- Coordinates: 34.55294°N 69.03442°E
- Purpose: Irrigation
- Status: Operational
- Construction began: 1930s
- Owner: Ministry of Energy and Water

Dam and spillways
- Type of dam: Embankment
- Impounds: Paghman River
- Height: 30 m (98 ft)
- Length: 1.68 km (1.04 mi)
- Elevation at crest: 1,973 m (6,473 ft)
- Width (crest): 600 m (2,000 ft)
- Width (base): 87 ha (210 acres)
- Dam volume: 5,000 ha (12,000 acres)

Reservoir
- Total capacity: 12,000,000 m^{3} (420,000,000 cu ft)

Qargha Dam (Dari: بند قرغه; Pashto: د قرغې بند) is located in the town of Qargha, about 10 mi (16 km) west from the Shahr-e Naw neighborhood of Kabul, Afghanistan. It is an embankment dam built on the Paghman River, with a side channel spillway under the road running on top of the dam. Its reservoir can hold up to 12,000,000 m^{3} (420,000,000 cu ft) of water, which is used for irrigation purposes. The dam is named after the town.

== History ==
Qargha Dam was built in the 1930s under King Mohammad Nadir Shah and his son Mohammad Zahir Shah, mainly for irrigation and tourism purposes. The height of the dam is approximately 30 m (98 ft). Its length is 1.68 km (1.04 mi) and its width 600 m (2,000 ft). A sluice gate of the dam which was damaged has since been restored. The reservoir water spread area behind the dam is 5,000 ha (12,000 acres). The reservoir volume is 32.8 million m^{3}, and was developed for the purpose of recreation in the 1950s when Mohammad Daoud Khan was the Prime Minister. It has since been a popular picnic location, particularly on the weekends and public holidays when it is visited by a large number of picnickers. During the Seventh Fiver Plan of the country, the stored water from the dam was planned for supplementing drinking water to Kabul city.

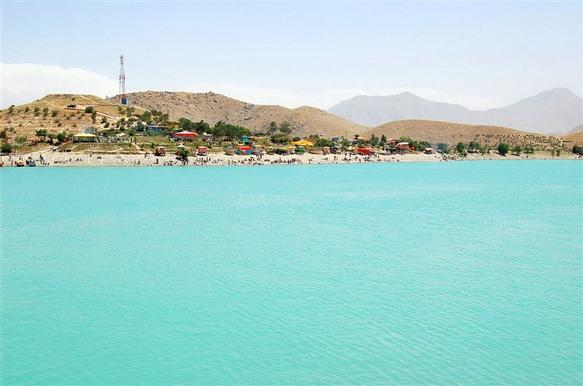
The reservoir of Qargha Dam in 2007

An irrigation canal is proposed to be built from the dam, and survey for the same has been completed from the dam up to Badambagh. This canal is proposed for providing irrigation and expand horticulture.

The reservoir has been developed for trout fishing with a hatchery set up close to the reservoir. As part of recreation, apart from the lakeside upscale Spojhmai Hotel, there was a nine-hole golf course at the extreme periphery of the reservoir.

A new hydrological station was set up in 2008 at the location of the reservoir for planning of water resources development as part of the network of 174 hydrological stations and 60 snow gauges and meteorological stations proposed in the country. This project is funded by the United Nations Food and Agriculture Organization (FAO).

== Fish hatchery ==
The reservoir of Qargha Dam feeds a fish hatchery and stocks the rainbow trout fingerlings. The hatchery was set up in 1967 close to the dam and draws water from the reservoir. The hatchery was established in the 1970s when 30,000 trout fingerlings were produced and then stocked in the reservoir and in many other rivers such as Panjshir, Bamyan, Salang and Sarda. The objective of stocking in the reservoir was meant as a recreational fishing activity under licensed sport fishing. Under UNDP/FAO assistance the hatchery was rehabilitated in 1987, and during 1988-89 egg incubators were repaired and set up with new egg trays to restart production. Eggs were imported from Denmark in 1988. These were stocked in the floating cages moored in the reservoir so that fishes grew into marketable size. Concrete raceways adjoining the farm were also repaired and put to use. In 1989, the fish farm was capable of producing 10 tons of rainbow trout. In 2013, the USAID suspended the project claiming that the local governor failed to pay 1.1 million dollars for the 10% of the costs agreed.

== Planning for hydropower development ==
The United States Army Corps of Engineers in their studies for "Potential Renewable Energy Technologies in Northwest Kabul", have examined utilization of the storage of Qargha reservoir and the head created by the dam. Two alternatives have been studied. In the first, the head available at the dam location of about 25 m (82 ft) below the dam could generate power of 26 kW with regulated releases from the dam giving an annual energy generation of 227,760 kWh. In the second alternative a head of 100 m (330 ft) could be created over a distance of 2,000 m (6,600 ft) from the dam which could be utilized for power generation of 103 kW with energy generation of 902,280 kWh, drawing water from the reservoir through a penstock pipe line.

== Drought ==
As of 2023, Lake Qargha shrunk to one third of its original size due to climate change and ongoing drought. The changes are also expected to adversely affect the ground water levels in Kabul.

== See also ==
- List of dams and reservoirs in Afghanistan
- Tourism in Afghanistan

== Bibliography ==
- Clammer, Paul (2007). Afghanistan. Ediz. Inglese. Lonely Planet. ISBN 978-1-74059-642-8.
- Iḥṣāʼīyah, Afghanistan. Riyāsat-i (1970). Survey of Progress.
- Plān, Afghanistan. Vizārat-i (1976). Text. Ministry of Planning.
- Razmi, Haji (12 August 2015). The Alliance. Outskirts Press. ISBN 978-1-4787-5928-7.
- Service, British Broadcasting Corporation. Monitoring (1990). Summary of World Broadcasts: The Far East. Weekly economic report. Monitoring Service of the British Broadcasting Corporation.
