= Jinnah Hospital, Kabul =

Hospital in Kabul, Afghanistan

Jinnah Hospital
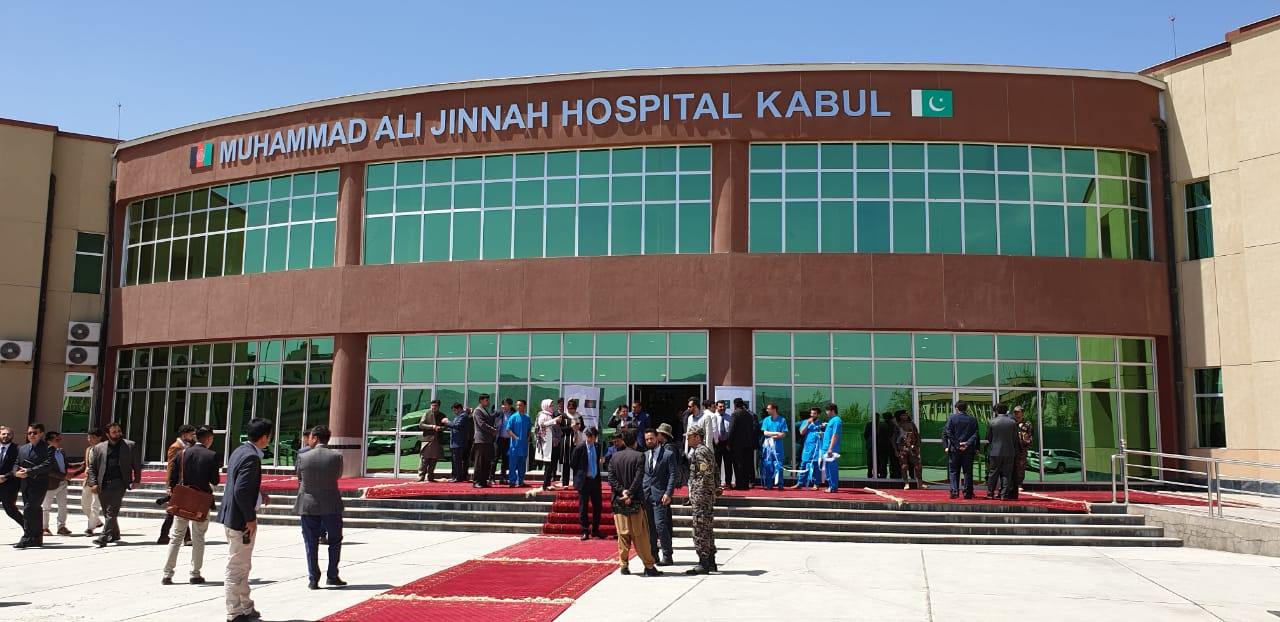

- Location in Kabul

Geography
- Location: District 13, Kabul, Kabul Province, Afghanistan
- Coordinates: 34°30′9″N 69°5′56″E

Organisation
- Type: Teaching hospital

Services
- Emergency department: Yes
- Beds: 200

History
- Founded: 20 April 2019

Jinnah Hospital (Pashto: جناح روغتون; Dari: شفاخانه جناح) is a 200-bed hospital in Kabul, Afghanistan. Built by the government of Pakistan, it is one of the largest hospitals in Afghanistan under the control of the Afghan Ministry of Public Health.

Jinnah Hospital was opened for the public on 20 April 2019 during an inauguration ceremony. It has recently been transformed into a teaching hospital.

== History and background ==
The construction of Jinnah Hospital was funded by Pakistan and is named after the founder and first Governor-General of Pakistan, Muhammad Ali Jinnah. It is part of a series of Pakistani development projects in Afghanistan under the Pakistan Technical Assistance Programme. The flagship project was approved by the Planning Commission initially at a cost of $18 million, and the contract was signed in March 2007. The hospital's foundation stone was laid on 10 October 2007. Jinnah Hospital's design and construction services were undertaken by NESPAK and the National Logistics Cell. Around 25 acres of land for the medical complex were reserved by the Afghan government in District 13 of Kabul.

Jinnah Hospital will facilitate the availability of healthcare services to the most vulnerable population of Afghanistan – mothers and children. It will also add to the general healthcare facilities available to the people of Afghanistan.

— Mohammad Amin Fatemi, former Health Minister of Afghanistan.

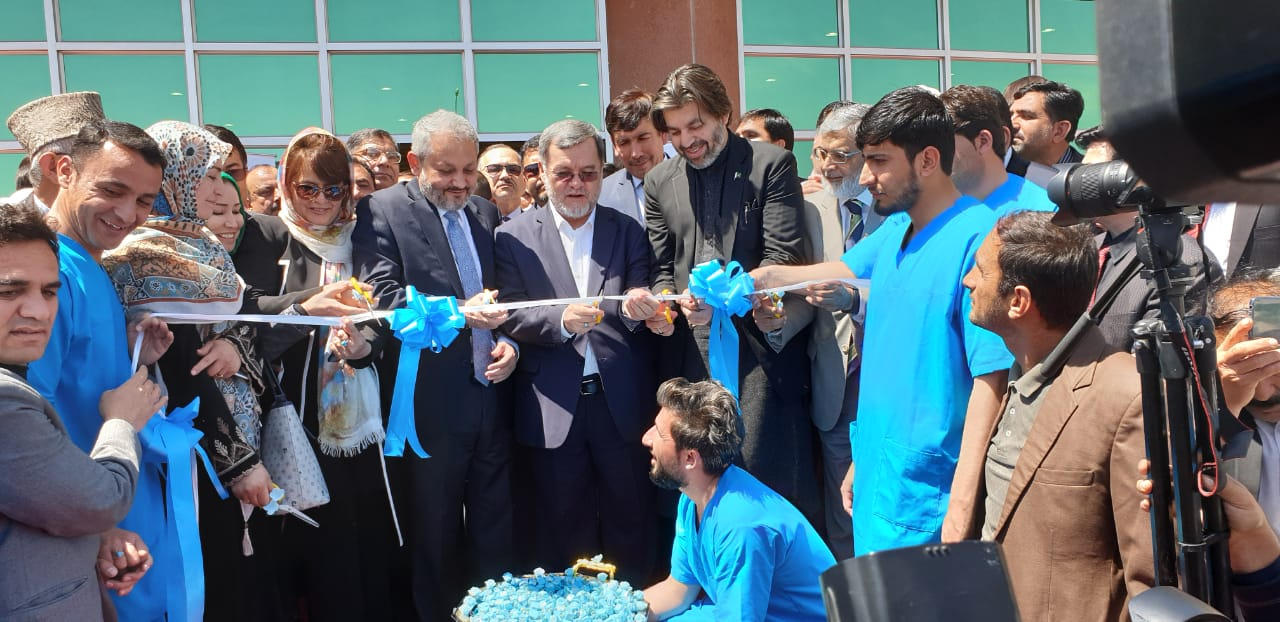
Former Afghan and Pakistani dignitaries jointly inaugurating the Jinnah Hospital in Kabul, Afghanistan.

On 20 April 2019, the hospital was inaugurated and opened for services during a ceremony presided over by Afghan Vice President Sarwar Danish as chief guest, with Afghanistan's health minister Ferozuddin Feroz and Pakistan's Minister of State for Parliamentary Affairs, Ali Muhammad Khan, also present. Feroz appreciated the "generous gift" and thanked "Pakistan’s immense assistance in the health sector" of Afghanistan, while Khan described the hospital as part of Imran Khan administration's vision of providing welfare for the Afghan people. He expressed his hopes that the project would make a "substantial contribution" to the country's health services. Pakistan officially handed over the facility to the Afghan Ministry of Public Health.

The total cost of the project at completion was $24 million, and construction was undertaken over 12 years since the date of inception. The deteriorating security situation in Afghanistan, as well as institutional and bureaucratic inefficiencies were cited as reasons for the delay in completion. At the time of inauguration, Pakistan was also building the Nishtar Kidney Centre in Jalalabad, and the 100-bed Naeb Aminullah Khan Hospital in Logar at a cost of $19 million, both of which were nearing completion.

== Medical facilities ==
The hospital comprises a two-story structure spread out over an area of 16,700 m^{2}. The building has ten towers. It includes a casualty block, blood bank, outpatient department, dialysis centre, administration block, intensive care unit, constant care centre, thalassemia centre, wards for gynaecology, medicine and surgeries, as well as pediatrics, emergency and food services.

Also included are a pharmacy, laundry and sterilising department. The blocks are accessible and connected to each other via covered corridors, stairs and lifts. The hospital's infrastructure includes overhead water tanks, two tube wells, five 1,000 kVa diesel-powered generators, a pump house and septic tanks, an electrical transformer, and fire alarm and nurse calling systems.

According to the Pakistani embassy in Kabul, Jinnah Hospital's furnishing and equipment costs – in addition to training of doctors, paramedics and other hospital staff – shall be covered under a grant provided by Pakistan.

== See also ==
- Healthcare in Afghanistan
- List of hospitals in Afghanistan
- Afghanistan–Pakistan relations
