= Wazir Akbar Khan Hill =

Hill in Kabul, Afghanistan

- د وزیر اکبر خان غونډۍ تپه وزیر اکبر خان
- Interactive map of Wazir Akbar Khan Hill
- 34°32′34″N 69°10′49″E

The Wazir Akbar Khan Hill (Pashto: د وزیر اکبر خان غونډۍ; Dari: تپه وزیر اکبر خان) is a historic site on a hill in the affluent Wazir Akbar Khan area of Kabul, Afghanistan. It houses the Bibi Mahro Public Park, a mosque dedicated to Taliban founder Mullah Omar, a castle and several burial sites. The most noticeable landmark on the hill is the giant flag of Afghanistan, which was originally raised on the 99th anniversary of Afghan Independence Day in 2016. The flag was changed in 2022 to that of the flag of the Islamic Emirate Afghanistan or the Taliban.

The Wazir Akbar Khan Hill serves as one of the many tourist attractions in Kabul. It is named in honor of Wazir Akbar Khan, who was Emir of Afghanistan from December 1842 to April 1843. He has built a castle there and is known as the Wazir Akbar Khan Qal'a or Qala-e Wazir Akbar Khan. The hill also has several cemeteries on its western and northeastern lowest ends. Former Afghan President Burhanuddin Rabbani is believed to be buried somewhere on the hill. The British Sherpur Cantonment (British cemetery) is next to the hill, across the street in its western end.

== See also ==
- Tourism in Afghanistan
- Wazir Akbar Khan Hospital
