= March 2018 Kabul suicide bombing =

Suicide bombing

- Part of the War in Afghanistan
- Blast site (Kabul) Blast site (Afghanistan)
- Location: 34°31′06″N 69°07′37″E; Kabul, Afghanistan
- Date: March 21, 2018; 12:00 PM (UTC+4:30)
- Target: Shia Muslims
- Attack type: Suicide bombing
- Weapon: Bomb
- Deaths: 33 (+1 attacker)
- Injuries: 65
- Perpetrator: Islamic State of Iraq and the Levant
- Motive: Sunni fundamentalism Anti-Shi'ism

A suicide bombing occurred on 21 March 2018 around 12:00 PM (7:30 AM UTC) in Kabul near Kart-e Sakhi, a Shia shrine. At least 33 people were killed with more than 65 wounded in the bombing. The militant group ISIL claimed responsibility for the attack.

== Attack ==
Kabul had been on alert for attacks during Nowruz, the Persian New Year. The attack took place at the Sakhi shrine, a frequented location during the occasion. The shrine has been the target of previous attacks; in October 2016, 14 people were killed during the festival of Ashura, and 11 people had been killed in a bombing in 2011. A spokesperson for the Afghan Ministry of the Interior stated that the attacker approached the shrine on foot who was then prevented from getting closer to the shrine due to police checkpoints and when he was identified by the police, he detonated the explosives he was carrying among a group of passersby. At least 33 people were killed in the bombing, while injuring more than 65, according to a statement from a spokesperson for the Ministry for Public Health.

=== Perpetrators ===
The Amaq News Agency, the unofficial mouthpiece of the Islamic State of Iraq and the Levant (ISIL), claimed responsibility for the attack on behalf of the group, saying that the attacks specifically targeted Shiites celebrating Nowruz. ISIL has repeatedly targeted Shia Muslims, who form a minority of 15% in Afghanistan, over the past few years.

== Aftermath ==
The spokesman for Kabul's police force said that an investigation had been launched into the bombing. Survivors claimed about 20 were lightly injured as well.

=== Reactions ===
Shortly after the attack, Afghanistan's National Security Advisor Hanif Atmar was interviewed about the country's strategy to combat extremism by German broadcaster Deutsche Welle, who condemned the attack and highlighted that the West and the country share "a common threat". The Indian Ministry of External Affairs condemned the "inhumane and barbaric" attack, and offered to provide any required assistance to Afghanistan. Tadamichi Yamamoto, UN Secretary-General's Special Representative for Afghanistan and head of the UN Assistance Mission in Afghanistan strongly condemned the suicide bombing and called the attacks "unjustifiable". The US ambassador to Afghanistan, John R. Bass also condemned the attack in a statement stating "...[he] was deeply saddened by the shameful attack near Kabul University today, at the start of the new year."

The Prime Minister of Pakistan Shahid Khaqan Abbasi in a meeting with Afghan ambassador Hazrat Omar Zakhilwal, condemned the blast and expressed grief at the loss of lives.

== See also ==
- List of terrorist incidents linked to Islamic State – Khorasan Province
- List of terrorist incidents in March 2018
- List of terrorist attacks in Kabul
