= Shahr-e Naw =

Coordinates: 35°56′N 68°43′E

Shahr-e Naw شهرنو
- Neighborhood of Kabul
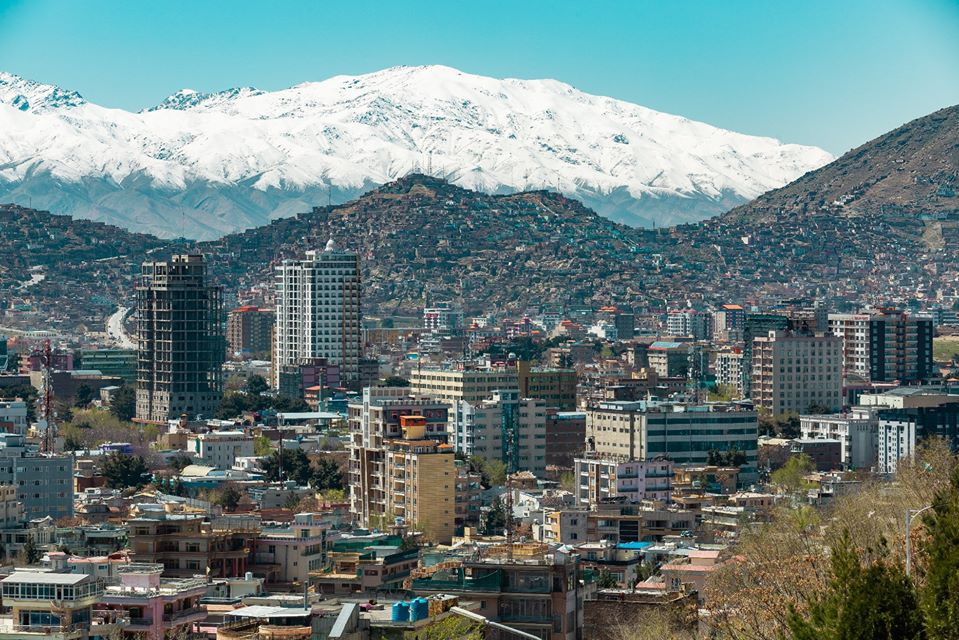

- Country: Afghanistan
- Province: Kabul

Shahr-e Naw (Pashto: شهر نو; Dari: شهرنو) is one of the affluent neighborhoods in Kabul, Afghanistan. It is a downtown commercial area housing most of the bigger buildings such as office centers, shopping centers, embassies, supermarkets, hotels, popular restaurants, banks, hospitals, mosques, and luxury apartments. To its west lies Karte Sakhi, and to its east is the affluent Wazir Akbar Khan neighborhood. Its name in a general sense means New Town, which is taken as it was first built in the early 20th century as a 'new' urban extension north of the historic city of Kabul.

== Economy ==
Ariana Afghan Airlines's corporate headquarters are in Shahr-e Naw. Kam Air has a ticketing office in the Kabul Business Centre in Shāre Naw. At one time the facility housed the airline's head office. Safi Airways also had its head office in Shahr-e Naw.

== Government and infrastructure ==
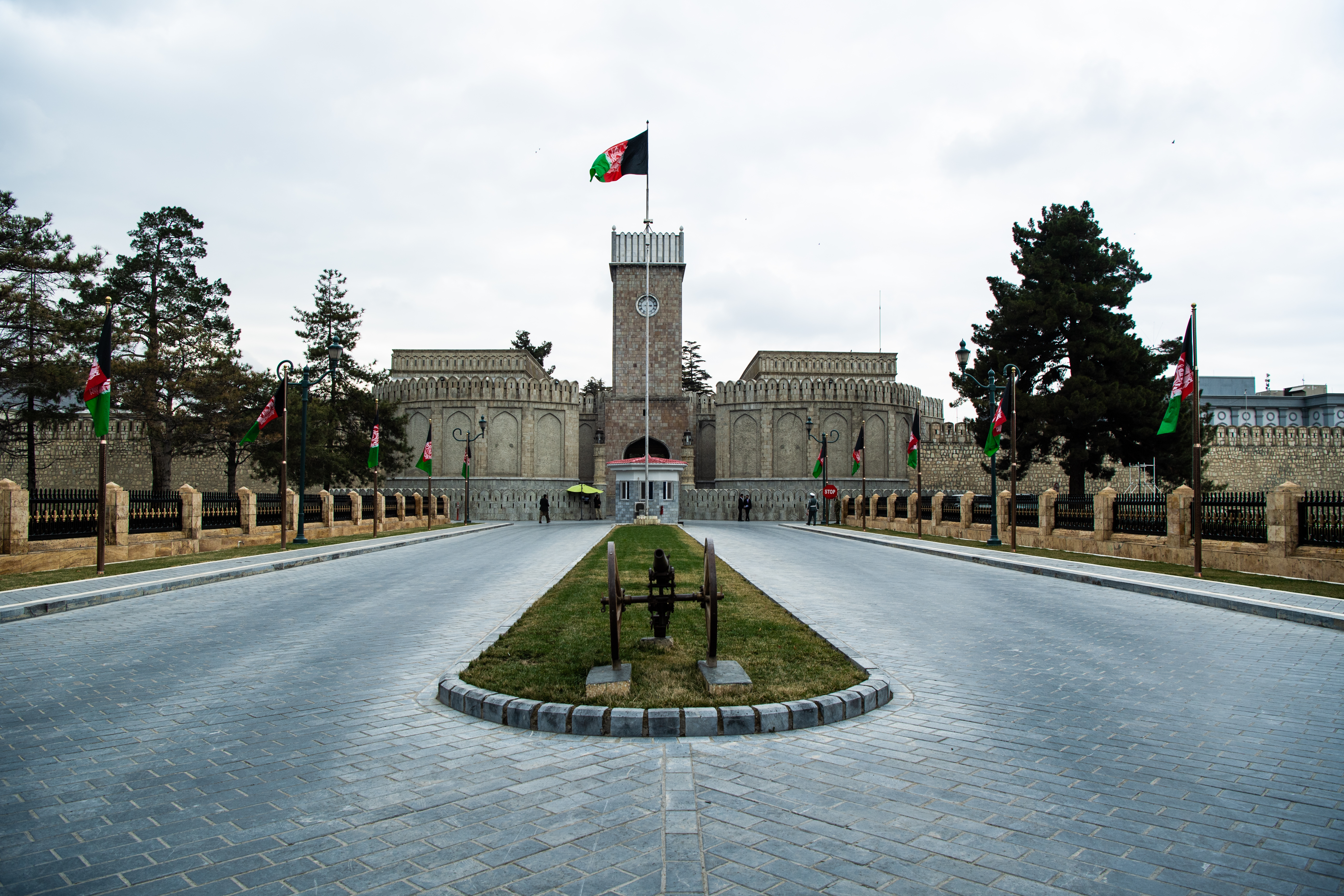
Former presidential palace of Afghanistan is in Shahr-e Naw.

Arg, which is the former presidential palace of Afghanistan, is located in the southeastern part of Shahr-e Naw. The Shahr-e Naw Park is located in the northwestern part. The Kabul Serena Hotel, Jamhuriat Hospital and Abdul Rahman Mosque are also in Shahr-e Naw.

== Education ==
The Lycee Esteqlal, a Franco-Afghan school and one the most prestigious in the country, is located in Shahr-e Naw. The Deutsche Schule Kabul was also there.

== Postal code ==
The area's government postal code is 1003.
