= Maiwand Teaching Hospital =

Hospital in Kabul, Afghanistan

Geography
- Location: Kabul, Afghanistan

Organisation
- Type: General hospital

Services
- Emergency department: Yes
- Beds: 250

Helipads
- Helipad: No

History
- Founded: 1937

The Maiwand Teaching Hospital is a public teaching hospital in the central part of Kabul, Afghanistan, near the historical Shah-Do Shamshira and Pul-e Khishti mosques. The hospital was built in 1937 under the Kingdom of Afghanistan, and it operates in coordination with both the Ministry of Public Health and the Ministry of Higher Education.

The Maiwand Teaching Hospital was originally called Qale-e-Baqer Khan Hospital, later the name was changed to Mastorat. It was given its present name during the Democratic Republic of Afghanistan. It is closely linked with Kabul University of Medical Sciences. It was set up to treat around 300-400 patients a day, but the daily patient load now often surpasses 1,000. It has departments of otorhinolaryngology, dermatology, pediatrics, Plastic Surgery and Pediatric Surgery.

== See also ==
- List of hospitals in Afghanistan
