= Maidan Shar District =

District of Maidan Wardak, Afghanistan

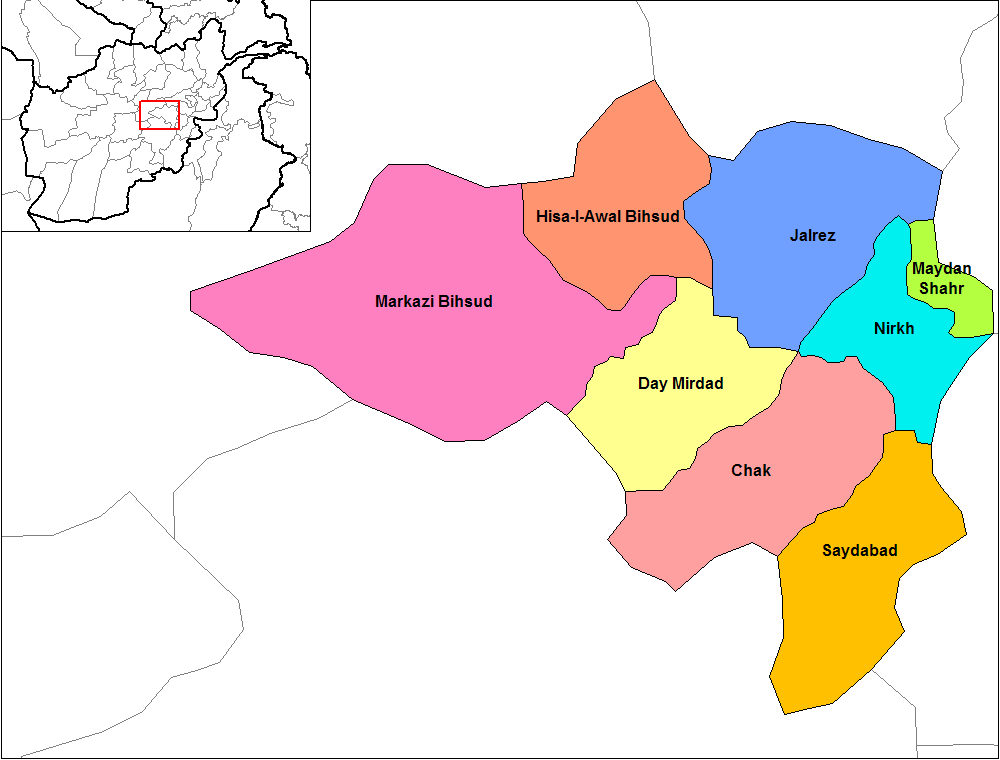
Districts of Wardak.

Maydan Shahr (Pashto: میدان ښار) is a district in the east of Wardak Province, Afghanistan. Its population was estimated at 121,531 in 2002, consisting of about 85% Pashtuns and 14% Tajiks, with a few Hazara families. The district centre is Maydan Shahr.
