= Mirwais Hospital =

Mirwais Regional Hospital

Geography
- Location: Shahr-e Naw, Kandahar, Kandahar Province, Afghanistan
- Coordinates: 31.620922°N 65.679928°E

Organisation
- Type: General hospital
- Affiliated university: Kandahar University
- Patron: Afghan Red Crescent Society

Services
- Beds: 600

History
- Constructed: 1979
- Opened: 1979

The Mirwais Regional Hospital (Pashto: د ميرويس نيکه حوزوي روغتون), also known as Shafakhanai Chinai, is a general hospital in the Shahr-e Naw neighborhood of Kandahar, in southern Afghanistan. It is one of several advanced medical-treatment facilities in the area, and is administered by the Ministry of Public Health. The name of the hospital relates to Mirwais Hotak, who is known as Mirwais Neeka (Mirwais the Grandfather).

== History ==
The 600-bed hospital was built with aid from China in 1979, but services have been affected by years of fighting in the region. The hospital was damaged during the long period of unrest in the country. It was rebuilt in 1995 by the International Committee of the Red Cross (ICRC) through the Afghan Red Crescent Society (ARCS).

The Mirwais Hospital has served as a teaching hospital for Kandahar University's Faculty of Medicine. According to a 2007 report by The Senlis Council, not only people from Kandahar province are treated at Mirwais Hospital but also from neighboring Helmand, Zabul, Oruzgan and others. It was heavily used during the 2001-2021 War in Afghanistan. The state-run hospital receives 70% of its funding from the ARCS, who have about 30 expatriate staffs working permanently at the hospital.

== Services ==
The hospital has:

- pediatric treatment unit
- 150-bed surgical unit
- 3 operating theatres
- blood bank
- oxygen plant
- X-ray department
- kitchen facilities to provide food for patients and staff
- laundry facility

== See also ==
- List of hospitals in Afghanistan
