= Kabul District =

Kabul District ولسوالی کابل د کابل ولسوالی
- District
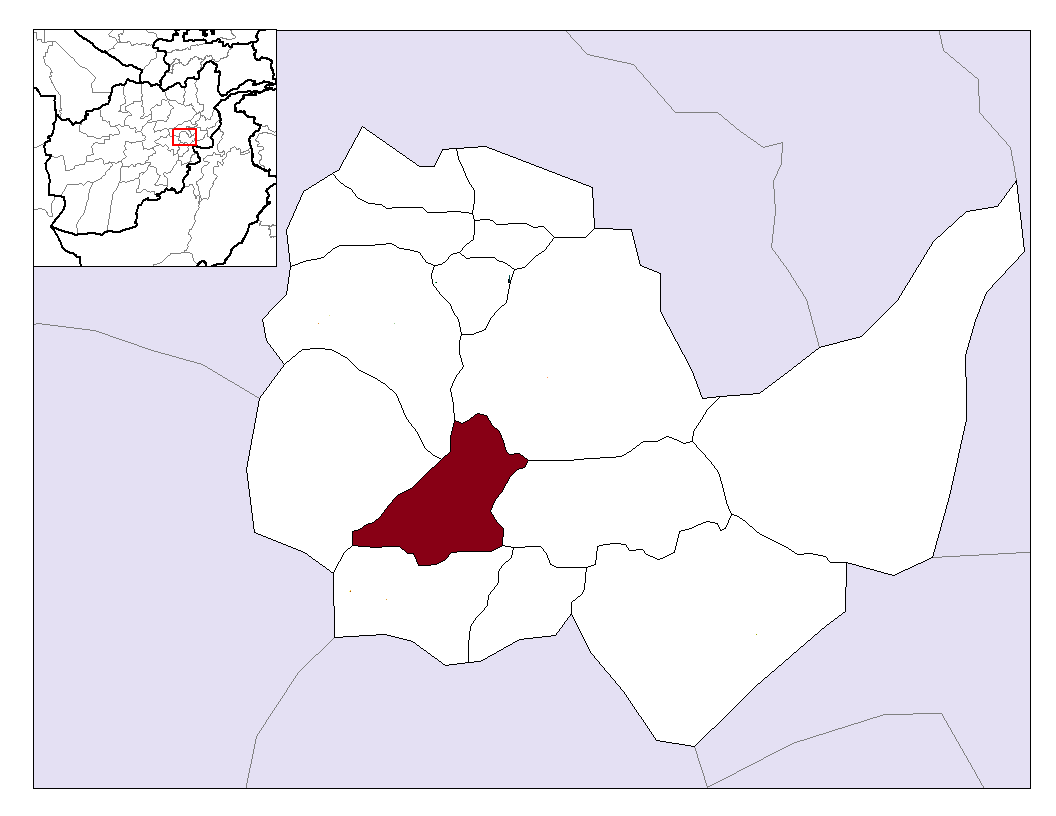
- Location in Kabul Province
- Country: Afghanistan
- Province: Kabul
- Center: Kabul
- No. of nahias: 22

Government
  - Type: Municipality
  - Mayor: Mawlawi Abdul Rashid

Area
  - Land: 1,049 km^{2} (405 sq mi)
- Elevation: 1,791 m (5,876 ft)

Population
  - Estimate (2025): 5,333,284
- Time zone: UTC+04:30 (Afghanistan Time)
- ISO 3166 code: AF-KBL
- Website: km.gov.af

Kabul District (Note: Pashto: کابل, romanized: Kābəl [kɑˈbəl]; Dari: کابل, romanized: Kābul [kʰɑːˈbʊ́l]) is one of the 15 districts of Kabul Province in the eastern part of Afghanistan. It encompasses Kabul, which is the capital and largest city of Afghanistan. The district has an estimated population of 5,333,284 people. They belong to all ethnic groups of Afghanistan, and Dari and Pashto are their main languages. Mawlawi Abdul Rashid is the current mayor of the district.

The administrative center of Kabul District is the city of Kabul, which is divided into five zones and 22 nahias (city districts). Every nahia has a police station and a number of neighborhoods. The district of Kabul has a land area of 1,049 km^{2} (405 sq mi) or 103,049 ha (254,640 acres). In 2015 the district had 396,095 dwelling units in it.

There are two rivers that flow in the district, the Kabul River and the Paghman River. The two largest bodies of water in the district are the Qargha Lake and the Hashmat Khan Lake.

Kabul District is surrounded by the following districts, in clockwise: Deh Sabz District in the north and northeast; Bagrami District in the east; Char Asiab District in the south; Paghman District in the west; and Shakardara District in the northwest.

== See also ==
- Districts of Afghanistan
