= Daoud Khan Military Hospital =

Sardar Mohammad Daoud Khan National Military Hospital
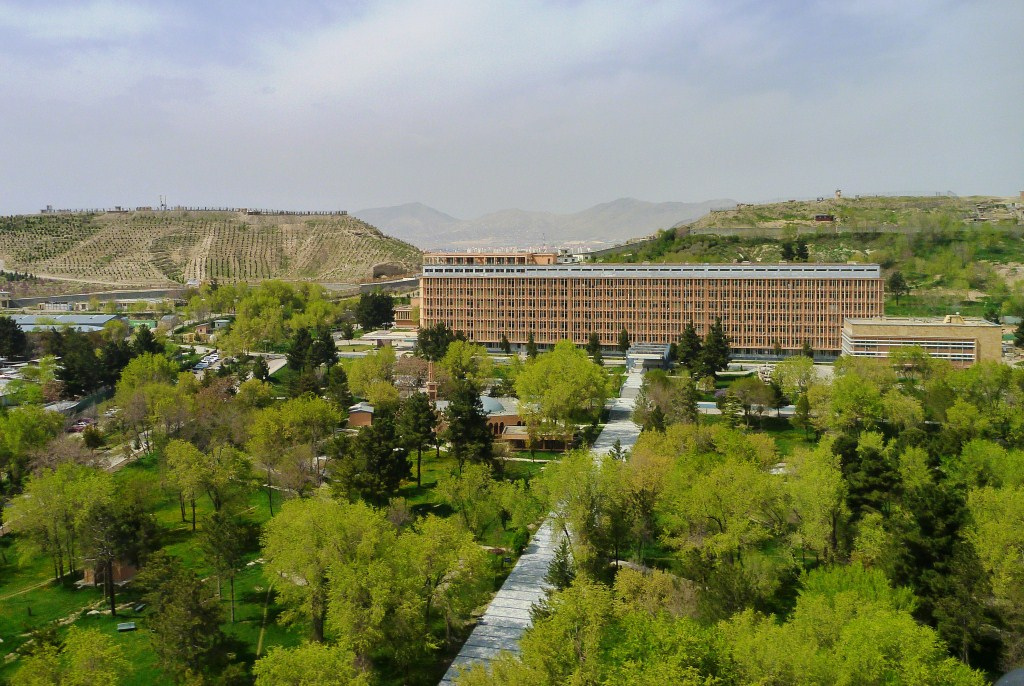

Geography
- Location: Wazir Akbar Khan, Kabul, Afghanistan
- Coordinates: 34.5414°N 69.1884°E

Organisation
- Type: Military; teaching

Services
- Emergency department: Yes
- Beds: 400

Helipads
- Helipad: Yes

History
- Founded: 1973; 53 years ago

The Sardar Mohammad Daoud Khan National Military Hospital, often referred to as the Daoud Khan Hospital or the National Military Hospital, is a military hospital located in Kabul, Afghanistan. With 400 beds, it is one of the largest military medical facilities in Afghanistan, and prior to 2021 provided medical services to members of the Afghan National Security Forces, and also contains a teaching department. Constructed in 1973 by engineers from the then-Soviet Union, it is now described as the "crown jewel" of the Afghan healthcare industry.

== History ==
The Daoud Khan Military Hospital was constructed by the Soviets in 1973. In June 1980, at least 600 seriously wounded Soviet troops were admitted. Of those 600 admitted to the hospital and 400 more admitted to nearby Soviet clinics, 200 out of the 1000 total died of their wounds.

Today, with 400 beds, Daoud Khan Military Hospital is one of the largest and highest capacity medical facilities in Afghanistan.

On 22 October 2015, Afghan President Ashraf Ghani visited patients in the hospital.

=== Attacks ===
==== 2011 ====
At midday on Saturday, 21 May 2011, a powerful bomb was detonated on the grounds of Daoud Khan Military Hospital, killing 6 people and injuring 26. It was the work of a suicide bomber who set off the blast inside a tent on hospital grounds while medical trainees were sitting down to eat lunch. It is unknown how the attacker infiltrated the hospital property, having someone gone through military checkpoints at the entrances.

The Taliban claimed responsibility for the attack through a spokesman for the group, Zabiullah Mujahid. Afghan President Hamid Karzai condemned the attack as a "wild act" against human and religious values, saying in a statement, "The enemies of Afghanistan are so cruel and spiritless that they attack even patients and doctors of the hospital, which is against Islamic law and principles." International Security Assistance Force spokesman Vic Beck called the strike "abhorrent," saying it "represents the lowest, most cowardly attack." The United Nations Assistance Mission in Afghanistan (UNAMA) said in a statement, "All medical personnel and facilities must be respected and protected in all circumstances. Further, directing an attack against a zone established to shelter wounded and sick persons, and civilians from the effects of hostilities, is also illegal and prohibited. As parties to the conflict, all anti-government elements have clear responsibilities under international humanitarian law to protect civilians and to not attack them," UNAMA said in a statement.

==== 2017 ====
On 8 March 2017, the Daoud Khan Military Hospital was attacked by a group of gunmen, some of them dressed in white hospital robes. Government officials confirmed at least 49 people were killed in the hours-long assault, while 63 others were injured. By March 13 the unconfirmed death toll had surpassed 100, with an unknown number injured. The Islamic State claimed to have carried out the attack, but officials suspected the Haqqani network instead.

The then-Afghan President Ashraf Ghani and Chief Executive Abdullah Abdullah both made statements condemning the attack, as did UNAMA. In the days after the attack, both Ghani and Abdullah visited the hospital to thank the doctors and assess damages.

From the United States, Army General John W. Nicholson Jr., commander of the US Forces in Afghanistan, condemned the attack as an "unspeakable crime," and praised security forces for their swift response, saying they deserved "our highest praise and respect." The U.S. Embassy in Kabul released a statement saying, "Targeting a medical facility providing care for the brave Afghans working to protect their fellow citizens has no possible justification in any religion or creed."

==== 2021 ====
On 2 November 2021, over two months after the Taliban retook control of Kabul, at least 25 people, including "Conqueror of Kabul" Hamdullah Mukhlis, were killed and many were wounded in a large incident which involved explosions at the hospital's main entrance, followed by gunfire in the 400-bed building. No one immediately claimed responsibility, but the Taliban alleged that insurgents of Islamic State – Khorasan Province carried out the attack.

== Administration and organization ==
The hospital was established to treat wounded Afghan soldiers, and is funded largely by the United States federal government. It is staffed entirely by Afghan doctors and nurses, with American military doctors and other U.S. personnel to serve as mentors and advisors.

== Controversies ==
During the summer of 2010, allegations of corruption and abuses came to light regarding the Daoud Khan Military Hospital. This included widespread theft, mismanagement, and patient neglect, as well as firsthand allegations that Afghan staff would steal fuel from the hospital's generators and steal pharmaceutical drugs to sell on the black market. Furthermore, American-trained Afghan doctors and nurses would rarely show up to work. Hospital conditions were described as "deplorable" and "Auschwitz-like." In September 2011, these abuses became public, and in October 2011, these issues were documented by the United States Department of Defense.

The hospital has also been subject to controversy in Afghanistan for its treatment of Taliban fighters during the recent war in Afghanistan. The hospital devoted two floors for Taliban patients, who were cared for by doctors without discrimination.

== See also ==
- List of hospitals in Afghanistan
