= French Medical Institute for Children =

French Medical Institute for Mothers and Children (FMIC)

Geography
- Location: Karte Sakhi, Kabul, Afghanistan

Organisation
- Type: Children, Mothers, Adult
- Affiliated university: Government of France, Government of Afghanistan, La Chaîne de l'Espoire, and Aga Khan Development Network (AKDN).
- Network: Aga Khan Development Network

Services
- Standards: ISO 9000- Re-certified 2015, 2019
- Emergency department: Yes
- Beds: 176

History
- Founded: 2006

Links
- Website: www.fmic.org.af

The French Medical Institute for Mothers and Children (FMIC) is a private hospital in the Karte Sakhi neighborhood of Kabul, Afghanistan, next to the Kabul University of Medical Sciences. The hospital was established in 2006 through a partnership between France and the Islamic Republic of Afghanistan.

FMIC provides inpatient care, clinical consultations, diagnostic services, eHealth, 24/7 pharmacy services, and advanced surgeries, neurology, adult cardiac care with a catheterization lab, cardiac surgery, orthopedics, ENT, ophthalmology, obstetric and gynecology, physiotherapy, vision and dental care.

In 2006, FMIC conducted the first open-heart pediatric cardiac surgery in Afghanistan of a 13-year-old girl. In 2012, construction at FMIC began on a new 52 bed wing for obstetric and gynecologic care and a 14-bed neonatal intensive care unit.

== See also ==
- List of hospitals in Afghanistan
