= Wazir Akbar Khan, Kabul =

Wazir Akbar Khan وزیر اکبر خان
- Neighborhood of Kabul
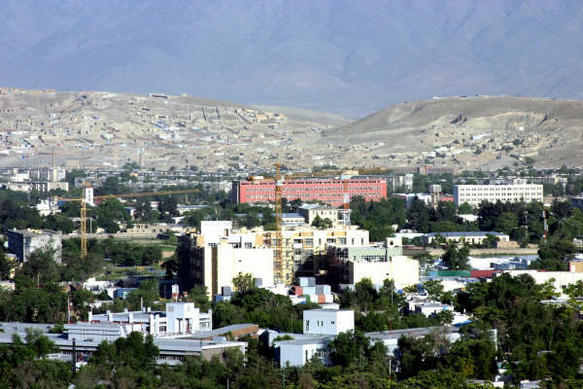

- Old map showing the location of Wazir Akbar Khan area
- Country: Afghanistan
- Province: Kabul
- District: Kabul
- Time zone: UTC+04:30 (Afghanistan Time)

Wazir Akbar Khan (Dari, Pashto: وزیر اکبر خان) is a neighborhood in the central part of Kabul, Afghanistan, forming part of the city's District 10 (also Police District 10). It is named in honor of Wazir Akbar Khan, who was Emir of Afghanistan from December 1842 to April 1843, and is one of the wealthiest neighborhoods of Kabul. Many foreign embassies are located there, including those of the United States and Canada. Many are currently not operating while some are. UN agencies, Afghan companies and national government institutions are also located in and around the neighborhood, including the Arg (Presidential Palace), Daoud Khan Military Hospital, and Amani High School.

Wazir Akbar Khan generally includes the area from the Kabul International Airport to the end of Wazir Akbar Khan Hill, where Sherpur and Shahr-e Naw neighborhoods start. It is a common place for foreign workers to reside there. The streets are laid out on a grid with Western, two-story houses that date back to the 1960s and 1970s.

== History ==
During the final stages of the 2021 Taliban offensive with the Taliban on the borders of the city, diplomats were evacuated from the district. On 23 September 2022, a deadly bomb explosion occurred at the neighborhood's mosque. A month later the suspects involved in the attack were killed by Afghan security forces. No other serious incident took place in Wazir Akbar Khan in that year. Recently new Wazir Akbar Khan traffic circle was added and many of the roads and sidewalks were rebuilt. Extra security forces have also been deployed in the area.

== In popular culture ==
The early part of the novel The Kite Runner by Khaled Hosseini is set in this suburb.
