= Kabul–Behsud Highway =

Road in Afghanistan

The Kabul–Behsud Highway, formally National Highway 13, NH13 (Persian: شاهراه کابل-بهسود) is a highway connecting Kabul in Afghanistan to Behsud in the west, passing through Maidan Wardak Province. It is cited as a highly dangerous route, prone to hijackings, beheadings, kidnappings and robberies, particularly in the districts of Jalrez and Markazi Behsud, and has obtained the moniker "Death Road" due to the frequency of Taliban killings along the route.

== History ==
In 2008, the Ministry of Public Works began the process of rehabilitating 136 kilometres of the highway, aided by 36 million euros funding from the Italian government. The first phase of the project, Lot No 1, began in 2008 with the rehabilitation of a 54 kilometre stretch of earth road starting in Maidan Shar and working towards the Onai Pass in Jalrez District. In 2009, American convoys were ambushed along the highway by the Taliban near the village of Zaiwalat.

In late July to early August 2012, 11 citizens of the Hazara ethnic group were brutally tortured and beheaded by the Taliban in the Kot-e Ashro area. In one incident on August 1, five people were forced off a vehicle on the highway and killed together.

== Description ==
The route passes southwest out of Kabul along the Kabul-Kandahar Highway, and forks to the west to the north of the town of Maidan Shar at what is known as Maidan Town, from which it is designated NH13 at 34°23′51.7″N 68°52′11.5″E. A 30 kilometres (19 mi) stretch in Jalrez district to the west of Maidan Shar en route to Jalrez town is particularly notorious, with so many incidents of beheadings and kidnappings against Hazaras that most drivers now avoid it. From Maidan Shar, the road passes through Kot-e Ashro, Zaiwalat, Jalrez, Takana and Sarchashma. There is a fork in the road near the village of Zarkjarid about 45 kilometres (28 mi) west of Jalrez town, with National Highway 3 and then National Highway 6 connecting it with Bamyan in the northwest, while the highway continues west-southwest to Behsud. At Behsud and 34°21′03.5″N 67°54′39″E, the highway becomes the Behsud-Punjab Highway, joining the A77 route.
