= Shibar District =

Shibar شیبر
- District
- Location within Afghanistan
- Coordinates: 34°55′12″N 68°02′24″E
- Country: Afghanistan
- Province: Bamyan
- Capital: Shibar
- Elevation: 2,637 m (8,652 ft)

Population (2011)
  - Total: 25,532

Shibar (Dari/Hazaragi: شیبر; pop.: 25,532 in the year 2011) is a district located in the eastern end of the Bamyan province in Afghanistan. It is in a mountainous region. The capital city Shibar is at 2,637 m altitude on the all-seasons secondary road from Bamyan to Kabul through the Shibar Pass.

== Development ==
In August 2009, the asphalting of a 110-km road linking Jabal-us-Siraj district of central Parwan province to Shibar Pass began. The road was planned to be constructed in one year at the cost of $60 million which was provided by the US PRT.

== Health and security ==
The district Health care is poor due to a lack of Health Care centers and poor transport. In July 2009, Agha Khan Development Network (AKDN) provided $4.9 million in Shibar district during the next 12 years to improve health services in the area.

The New Zealand PRT, operate in the district as well as most of Bamyan Province.

== Hajigak Mine ==
The hajigak iron ore was discovered at Hajigak mining concession near Hajigak Pass in 1960; it is mainly located in this district, however the mine also extends well into the Hesa Awal Behsood District of Maidan Wardak Province. The mine is 550 meters in depth. In October 2011, several checkpoints were established and 1,700 security personal were deployed, leading to an improvement in security around the Hajigak iron-ore mine.

== Indian govt plans ==
In May 2016, India, Iran and Afghanistan signed an agreement to develop two births at Port of Chabahar, build new Chabahar-Zahedan railway as part of North–South Transport Corridor by linking it with Trans-Iranian Railway, invest up to INR 1 lakh crore (US$14 billion) in the Chabahar Special Economic zone by building gas and urea plant as well as other industries, this will also be linked with Chabahar-Zaranj-Delaram-Hajigak railway: 900 km long Indian-Iranian project, would link future US$10 billion Indian iron-ore mining operations at Hajigak, Afghanistan to Chabahar, Iran.

== See also ==
- Hindu Kush Mountains
- Tajikistan
- The Silk Road
- Bamyan District
