= Afghan snowfinch =

- Illustration of a male (left) and a female (right)

Conservation status
- Least Concern (IUCN 3.1)

Scientific classification
- Kingdom: Animalia
- Phylum: Chordata
- Class: Aves
- Order: Passeriformes
- Family: Passeridae
- Genus: Pyrgilauda
- Species: P. theresae

Binomial name
- Pyrgilauda theresae (R. Meinertzhagen, 1937)

Synonyms
- Montifringilla theresae R. Meinzertzhagen, 1937

Species of bird

The Afghan snowfinch (Pyrgilauda theresae) or the Afghan ground-sparrow, bar-tailed snowfinch, Meinertzhagen's snowfinch, or Theresa's snowfinch, is a passerine bird of the sparrow family Passeridae, endemic to the northern parts of the Hindu Kush mountains in Afghanistan. There are no major threats to the species despite its restricted range, so it is assessed as least concern on the IUCN Red List. This species is mostly a seed-eater, supplementing its diet with some insects. It builds its nest in the burrows or hollows of ground-dwelling rodents, lined with hair or feathers.

== Taxonomy and systematics ==
This species was first scientifically recorded relatively late, by Richard Meinertzhagen on a 1937 expedition with Salim Ali. Meinertzhagen formally described the species in Bulletin of the British Ornithologists' Club paper later that year, and gave it the binomial name Montifringilla theresae. He reported that he collected the type specimen of the species in the Shibar Pass, between Bamyan and Kabul. The name he gave the species was after his cousin and companion, Theresa Clay, an expert on bird lice. While Meinertzhagen described several dozen species and subspecies (including others named after Clay), he was later found to have stolen specimens and falsified records, and this may be the only verifiably genuine taxon he described.

Meinertzhagen placed this species in the genus Montifringilla, which some classifications continue to place it in, along with about eight species of 'snowfinches'. Among these species, it is most similar to Blanford's snowfinch, which has similar plumage and essentially the same nesting habits. Some authors split this species, Blanford's snowfinch, and the other snowfinches of southern and central Asia as the genus Pyrgilauda, on the basis that their morphological traits, as well as habitat and ecology, are substantially different. (This is an arbitrary distinction, as there can be little doubt that Montifringilla in the broad sense is monophyletic.) One of the more prominent works to follow this classification recently, the Handbook of the Birds of the World, called the species of their genus Pyrgilauda 'ground-sparrows', on account of their different habitat and behaviour from the northern 'snowfinches'. No subspecies have been described.

== Description ==
It is 13.5–15 centimetres (5.3–5.9 in) long, weighing 23–35 grams (0.81–1.23 oz). The wingspan ranges from 8.5 to 9.9 cm (3.3–3.9 in), and bills measure from 1.3 to 1.5 cm (0.51–0.59 in). Females are slightly smaller on average than males.

The male is grey-brown with some white in the wings and a black face-mask and two-pronged patch on the throat. The female is a buff-tinged brown, with a weaker, greyer face mask and less white in the wings. There are short dark streaks on the mantle and a white subterminal band on the tail feathers other than the central pair. There is white on the upperwing coverts, secondaries, and inner primaries. The male has a brick red iris. The plumage of juvenile birds after fledging has not been described, but can be assumed to be similar to the female's plumage.

The only similar species that occur in the Afghan snowfinch's range are the white-winged snowfinch and the desert finch. It can be distinguished from the former by the smaller white patches on the wings and an overall more brownish plumage. While it is similar in general appearance to the latter species, the Afghan snowfinch is more streaked, has stronger facial markings, and has a smaller bill, among other differences.

The flight of the Afghan snowfinch is heavy and straight. The alarm call is a sharp tsi, and they make soft quaak calls in flight, and a stridulant zig-zig.

== Distribution and habitat ==
The Afghan snowfinch is the only species of bird known to be endemic to Afghanistan. It is found only in some northern parts of the Hindu Kush mountains, where it occurs at elevations of 2,575–3,000 m (8,450–9,840 ft). Besides the Shibar Pass, it is known from Deh Sabz and Unai Pass, and a few other localities between 67° and 69° E in the northerly ranges of the Hindu Kush. This species disperses in the winter especially after heavy snowfalls, and moves slightly beyond its breeding range, into lower altitudes and northwards into Badghis Province. It has been recorded on occasion as a vagrant in southern Turkmenistan. Its habitats are stony mountain slopes, plateaux, and open hillsides in the passes.

Despite having a relatively small range and population, it is not thought to have an unstable population or significant threats, so it is assessed as a species of least concern on the IUCN Red List. This species is among those protected by Band-e Amir National Park, Afghanistan's first national park, which encompasses a large area of the Hindu Kush near Bamyan.

== Behaviour and ecology ==
In winter, the Afghan snowfinch forms large flocks of dozens or hundreds, sometimes mixed with snowfinches of other species, rock sparrows, and various larks. This species feeds mostly on small seeds, from plants such as Carex pachystylis, Convolvulus divaricatus, and Thuspeinantha persica, and it will also eat insects such as ants and weevils.

The Afghan snowfinch builds nests in the burrows and hollows made by rodents, including ground squirrels, marmots, and in one recorded case Williams' jerboa (Allactaga williamsi). In particular, it is associated with the yellow ground squirrel (Spermophilus fulvus). Several of the other southern snowfinch species have similar nesting preferences, as does at least one species that occurs in the Afghan snowfinch's range, the isabelline wheatear. The materials used to line the burrows it nests in are the hairs of squirrels, sheep, and dromedaries; and feathers. Nests are built at the far end of the burrows, as protection from predators. The young hatch blind and helpless, with exposed pink skin and only a few, light-coloured tufts of down. Young give a soft call in response to adults calling at the entrance of a nest.
