= Mahdi Rasikh =

Afghan politician

Mahdi Rasikh مهدی راسخ

Afghanistan parliament

Personal details
- Born: 1985 (age 40–41) Day Mirdad, Maidan Wardak, Afghanistan
- Occupation: Politician
- Ethnicity: Hazara

Mahdi Rasikh (Dari: مهدی راسخ; born 1985) is a politician and former parliamentary lawyer from Afghanistan. He represented the people of Maidan Wardak in the Afghanistan parliament.

== Early life and education ==
Mahdi Rasikh was born in 1985 in Day Mirdad, Maidan Wardak, in a Hazara family. He holds a Master's degree in sociology.

== See also ==
- List of Hazara people
