= Jalrez District =

Place in Maidan Wardak Province, Afghanistan

Jalrez جلریز
- District
- Etymology: Jal (bright) and Rez (land)
- Location in Afghanistan
- Coordinates: 34°28′19″N 68°39′02″E
- Country: Afghanistan
- Province: Maidan Wardak
- Villages number: 124
- Capital: Jarlez

Government
  - Type: District
  - Governor: Naqibullah Haidari

Area
  - Total: 1,139 km^{2} (440 sq mi)
- Elevation: 2,375 m (7,792 ft)

Population (2020)
  - Total: 73,614
  - Density: 64.63/km^{2} (167.4/sq mi)
- Time zone: + 4.30
- Postal code: 1353
- Website: Main page

Jalrez (Pashto/Dari: جلریز) also known as "Death Valley," due to systemic persecution of the Hazaras traveling through the area, is a district in the west of Maidan Shar, Maidan Wardak Province, Afghanistan. The main town lies at Jalrez, which is 62.9 kilometres (39.1 mi) southwest of the centre of Kabul via the main Kabul-Behsud Highway. The valley has been one of the main active sites of the Taliban insurgents during the Afghanistan's Republic era.

== History ==
Jalrez lay along the Silk Road between Kabul and Bamyan. The name is believed to derive from the Dari words "jal", meaning 'light reflection' and "rez" meaning 'to pour', possibly related to the confluence of two rivers in the area. Prior to 1964, Jalrez District belonged to the Maidan alaqadari (subdistrict) of Kabul province.

Due to its strategical importance geographical, Jalrez has a long history of conflict, which has capitulated since the Saur Revolution of 1978. Jalrez was one of the first districts to be captured by the mujahedin in 1979 during the war against the Soviet-backed Afghan communist regime. The mujahedin crossed the Unai Pass in the spring, taking Sarchashma and burning the school there, before moving on to take Takana and Jalrez in the district. Their control ended at the end of the year when a Soviet strike killed 60 to 70 of the mujahedin. An allegiance of jihadi tanzim groups such as Mawlawi Muhammad Nabi Muhammadi's Harakat-e Enqelab-e Islami and Gulbuddin Hekmatyar's Hezb-e Islami united in the spring to recapture the district. During the Afghan Civil War of 1992–96, the jihadi tanzims concentrated most of their efforts in the Kabul area, and there were only a few skirmishes against Wahdat and Ettehad forces in Jalrez district. The Taliban has reemerged since 2003 and the area is subject to ongoing conflict. The Taliban attacked the town of Kot-e Ashro in 2006, which was the former seat of the district.

According to the National Statistics and Information Authority (NSIA)’s annual survey book, the district had approximately 57,870 people in 2018-19. In July 2019, a 203rd "Thunder" Corps airstrike killed 15 Taliban militants in Nirk District, including Qari Syed Agha, a commander of the Haqqani terrorist network who was based in Zaiwalat in Jalrez District. On 21 May 2021 Jalrez district was captured by Taliban after a five-day-long siege.

== Geography ==
Jalrez District is situated in the central-east part of the country in Maidan Wardak Province, with the district town of Jalrez lying 62.9 kilometres (39.1 mi) by road southwest of the centre of Kabul. The district is bordered by Hisa-I-Awali Bihsud District to the west, Daimirdad District to the southwest, Nirkh District to the southeast, Maidan Shar District to the east-southeast, Parwan Province to the north and Kabul Province to the east-northeast. The district is dominated by the Jalrez Valley, with a length of 37 kilometres (23 mi), and numerous secondary valleys.

The principal rivers are the Sarchashma River, the upstream part of the Kabul River which passes through the Unai Pass, and the Sanglakh River, which flows through the valley of the same name.

=== Subdivisions ===
The district is divided into five administrative sub-units (hawzaha-ye edari):

- Jalrez
- Zaiwalat
- Sanglakh
- Takana
- Sarchashma

== Demographics ==
The district is home to a significant population Pashtuns of the Ghilzai tribal confederacy, primarily Hotak, Amarkhel and Ibrahimkhel live in the Maidan Shar and Jalrez valleys.

== Economy and services ==
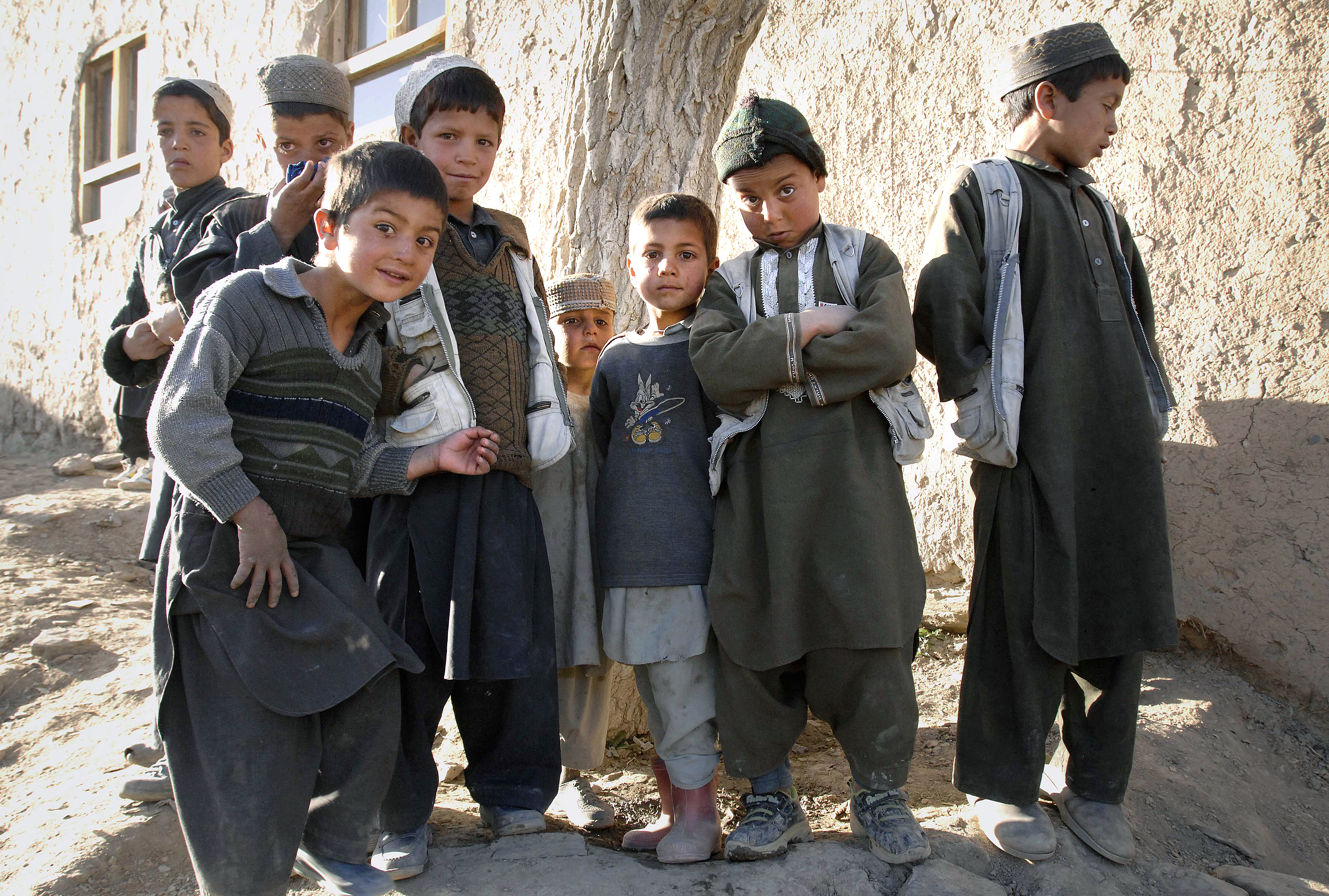
Local children in the Jalrez Valley

The district is a major producer and exporter of potatoes, but also produces apples, onions, rice, wheat, barley, mung beans, spinach, carrots, almonds, apricots and spinach. In 2008 there were 134,700 livestock in the district, of which 50,000 were sheep.

As of 2018 Jalrez has nine high schools, 11 middle schools and nine primary schools, run by the Ministry of Education (MoE) in conjunction with local councils and the education commission of the Taliban. There were a reported 358 teachers, of which 41 were women. The five health clinics in the district, consisting of one comprehensive health centre, three basic health centres and one sub-health centre as of 2018 were owned by the state and operated by the Swedish Committee for Afghanistan (SCA).

== Transport ==
The main road in the district is the Kabul-Behsud Highway, which passes through the southern centre and passing through the town of Jalrez. There is a fork in the road near the village of Zarkjarid about 45 kilometres (28 mi) west of Jalrez town, with the highway continuing to Daimirdad district, and another leading to Hisa-I-Awali Bihsud district and Bamyan in the northwest. There is another main road through the valley to the north of Jalrez. In 2008-2010 The Ministry of Public Works was still in the process of rehabilitating 136 kilometres of the Kabul highway in the district, aided by 36 million euros funding from the Italian government. The first phase of the project, Lot No 1, began in 2008 with the rehabilitation of a 54 kilometre stretch of earth road starting in Maidan Shar and working towards the Unai Pass.

== Notable people ==
- Samira Asghari (born 1994), member of the International Olympic Committee for Afghanistan
- Qari Sayed Agha (died 2019) - a Taliban commander of the Haqqani terrorist network, from Zaiwalat.

== See also ==
- Jaghatu District
