= Hamida Akbari =

Afghan politician

- حمیده اکبری

Afghanistan Parliament

Personal details
- Born: 1974 (age 51–52) Behsud, Maidan Wardak, Afghanistan
- Occupation: Politician

Hamida Akbari (Dari: حمیده اکبری) is an Afghan politician who was the representative of the people of Maidan Wardak province in the 16th term of the Afghan Parliament.

== Early life ==
Hamida Akbari was born in 1974 in Kabul but originally from Behsud district, Maidan Wardak province. She received her bachelor's degree in engineering from Kabul University.

== See also ==
- List of Hazara people
