= Takana, Afghanistan =

Takana تکانه
- Subdistrict and village
- Location in Afghanistan
- Coordinates: 34°26′24″N 68°32′48″E
- Country: Afghanistan
- Province: Maidan Wardak
- District: Jalrez
- Elevation: 2,629 m (8,625 ft)
- Time zone: UTC+04:30

Takana (Persian: تکانه) also Takānah-ye Bālā, is a subdistrict and village of Jalrez District, Maidan Wardak Province, Afghanistan. It lies along the Kabul–Behsud Highway, to the west of the town of Jalrez.

== History ==
The Taliban invaded Takana and Jalrez on July 20, 1997. Wahdat forces, consisting of mainly Hazaras, retreated into the valley and reportedly took out 70 Taliban in a counterattack, setting them on fire.

== Demographics ==
Though mainly ethnic Hazaras, a population of Tajiks live in the village. there are also Sadat ethnic group who are living in Takana. the people speaks persian in Takana and it has been said that majority of people in Takana are Tajiks ethnic group.
