= Gaw Kush (Wardak) =

- (Dari: گاوکش)
- Location within Afghanistan

Highest point
- Elevation: 2,779 m (9,117 ft)
- Parent peak: Hindu Kush
- Coordinates: 34°10′14″N 68°34′4″E

Geography
- Location: Wardak province, Afghanistan
- Parent range: Hindu Kush

Gaw Kush (Dari: گاوکش) is a mountain of the Hindu Kush Range. The 2,779 meter high mountain is located in the province of Wardak, Afghanistan.
