= Death Road =

Death Road may refer to:

- Yungas Road, a notoriously treacherous route in Bolivia
- Kabul–Behsud Highway, a highway in Afghanistan noted for its frequency of Taliban-related killings
