= Bahij =

Bahij is masculine given name and surname of Arabic origin. Notable people with the name include:

== Given name ==
- Bahij Hojeij (born 1948), Lebanese film director and screenwriter
- Bahij al-Khatib (1895–1981), Syrian politician
- Bahij Tabbara (1929–2026), Lebanese lawyer and politician

== Middle name ==
- Walid Bahij Ismail (born 1984), Lebanese football player

== Surname ==
- Abdul Hamid Bahij (born 1979), Afghan medical doctor
