= Zaiwalat =

Zaiwalat زیولات
- Subdistrict and village
- Location in Afghanistan
- Coordinates: 34°27′22″N 68°43′44″E
- Country: Afghanistan
- Province: Maidan Wardak
- District: Jalrez
- Elevation: 2,303 m (7,556 ft)
- Time zone: UTC+4:30

Zaiwalat, also Zaywalāyat or Zywlayt (Persian: زیولات) is a subdistrict and village of Jalrez District, Maidan Wardak Province, Afghanistan. It lies along the Kabul-Behsud Highway, to the west of Kot-e Ashro and to the east of the town of Jalrez. As of 2010 the village itself had a population of about 300 people. It is inhabited mainly by Pashtuns and is a producer of fruit, with extensive orchards in the vicinity.

== History ==
In 2009, American convoys were ambushed by the Taliban in the predominantly Pashtun village of Zaiwalat. The US retaliated and invaded the village at 3.15 a.m. on November 19, 2009, capturing nine locals, including Habib ur-Rahman, a suspected Talibanist, and taking them by helicopter to Rish-Khor for a three-day interrogation. As of 2010 the village had an estimated people of about 300 people.

In 2014, a 12 metres (39 ft) bridge was built in Zaiwalat. In September 2016, 11 men from the village were kidnapped by unidentified gunmen. After 20 days, a group from the village retaliated with an armed attack, capturing six people, leading to the release of the 11 hostages.

== Economy ==
The area is a producer of fruit, such as apples, apricots and peaches, with extensive orchards in Zaiwalat.

== Landmarks ==
The main school is Zaiwalat High School. and more

== Notable people ==
- Haji Mosa Hotak (born 1954) former Mujahedin commander
- Qari Sayed Agha (died 2019) - a Taliban commander of the Haqqani terrorist network, from Zaiwalat.
