= Gīrō Qalʽah =

Gīrō Qalʽah is the name of two villages in Afghanistan:

- Gīrō Qalʽah, located in Maidan Wardak Province
- Gīrō Qalʽah, located in Ghazni Province
