= Hajigak mining concession =

Hajigak Mine
- Hajigak Mine
- Coordinates: 34°40′N 67°57′E
- Country: Afghanistan
- Provinces: Maidan Wardak and Bamyan
- Districts: Hesa Awal Behsood and Shibar
- Elevation: 12,100 ft (3,700 m)

Hajigak Mine is the best-known and largest iron oxide deposit in Afghanistan, located near the Hajigak Pass, with its area divided between Maidan Wardak and Bamyan provinces. It has the biggest untapped iron ore deposits of Asia.

== Summary of deposits ==
The deposit itself stretches over 32 km (20 mi) and contains 16 separate zones, up to 5 km (3.1 mi) in length, 380 m (1,250 ft) wide and extending 550 m (1,800 ft) down dip, seven of which have been studied in detail. The ore occurs in both primary and oxidized states. The primary ore accounts for 80% of the deposit and consists of magnetite, pyrite and minor chalcopyrite. The remaining 20% is oxidized and consists of three hematitic ore types. The deposit remained unmined in 2006. The presence of coking coal nearby at Shabashak in the Dar-l-Suf District and large iron ore resources made the deposit viable for future development of an Afghan steel industry. Open pit mining and blast furnace smelting operations were envisioned by an early feasibility study. The Hajigak also includes the unusual niobium, a soft metal used in the production of superconducting steel.

== History ==
Germans were the first to plan to exploit this deposit systematically after planning a steel mill during or shortly after World War I. In the 1960s Russians prepared a comprehensive report on the mineral resources of Afghanistan, however also failed to exploit the deposits.

When in the 1960s the Kala Bagh steel mill was planned in Pakistan, it was expected that it could partly use Hajigak iron ore. This was because the Pakistani mines were not of good quality at the time. However, this scheme failed.

== Geology of Hajigak ==
Afghanistan has a complex geology due to its position on the junction between the Indo-Pakistan and Asian crustal plates. It is composed of a series of terranes that broke away from the main Gondwana super-continent before becoming accreted onto the southern margin of the Eurasian plate. The accretionary events started in the Cretaceous, around 140 million years ago, and have continued until recent times. At some stage in the early Cretaceous there is evidence of a collision of one of these blocks, the Farad block, with the Eurasian plate, along the Herat fault zone. Shortly afterwards, the Helmand block collided with the Farad block. The rocks that host the Hajigak deposit are within the Herat fault zone, and it is likely they were originally part of the Farad and Helmand Blocks.

The oldest part of the succession crops out north-west of the Hajigak deposits. It consists of grey silicified limestones and dolomites interbedded with dark grey crystalline schists and light coloured quartzites that display evidence of amphibolite grade metamorphism. The Hajigak iron deposit is hosted by the Upper Proterozoic Awband Formation that, together with the underlying Kab Formation, constitutes the Qala Series, a sequence of metavolcanic and metasedimentary rocks up to 4,500 m (14,800 ft) thick. The Kab Formation consists of dark grey sandy sericitic schists, interpreted as metamorphosed terrigenous rocks, acid volcanic rocks and minor beds of marble and phyllite. The Awband Formation is made up of schists (quartz-sericite, quartzchlorite-sericite, quartz-sericitechlorite and carbonaceoussericite) that are metamorphosed acid and basic tuffites and argillaceous rocks. Minor cherts and marbles also occur. The Green Schist Formation, a distinctive unit overlying the Awband Formation, consists dominantly of green chlorite schists, and quartz-sericitic schists locally intruded by granodiorites. Some reports consider it as a member of the Awband Formation. Upper Devonian rocks of the Hajigak Formation are faulted against the Green Schist Formation. Strata of Lower Cretaceous and younger age crop out in the south west of the area, unconformable on the older sequences.

The predominant strike of the Proterozoic and Palaeozoic rocks is between north-east and north-north-east, with a regional dip of approximately 50° towards the south-southeast or south-east. One major steeply dipping fault juxtaposes the Upper Proterozoic rocks against the crystalline middle Proterozoic rocks. Another throws Upper Devonian rocks against the Upper Proterozoic Green Schist Formation. In addition a suite of north–south and north-west–south-east trending faults, some of them probably thrusts, affect the Upper Proterozoic succession, including the iron ore deposits.

The Upper Proterozoic rocks of the Qala Series are interpreted as being deposited in a slowly subsiding marine basin. The initial basin fill was a variable sequence of sandstones and minor volcaniclastic sediments. Later there was an increase in volcanic activity and exhalative iron-rich fluids formed lenses on the sea floor. These sediments were subsequently altered by burial and low-grade (greenschist facies) metamorphism and became the basement of the Helmand Block. This block drifted away from Gondwana supercontinent in the Triassic. During the collision with Eurasia, in the early Cretaceous, faulting juxtaposed the Upper Proterozoic Qala series, the Middle Proterozoic rocks and the Upper Palaeozoic rocks. These fault-bounded blocks are a local characteristic of the Herat fault zone. As the collision progressed, the faulted blocks were folded into a northeast–south-west trending anticline the axis of which passes to the north of the area mapped. A series of thrusts developed as indicated by the increased thickness of the iron ore and its host rocks within the central zone at Hajigak. During the final phase of faulting the north–south and north-west–south-east faults that affect the ore deposits were developed. Later post-Cretaceous extension led to the further development of north-west–southeast faults and graben structures filled with young sediments. Subsequent erosion has exposed the core of the Hajigak anticline with the concordant ore bodies on the southeast limb.

== Mineralisation ==
The Hajigak deposit trends north-east–south-west for about 9 km and is made up of 16 separate ore bodies, each up to 3 km in length. The deposit can be divided up into three geographical parts, the western, central and eastern parts. In addition to the large ore bodies there is a substantial area of thin fragmental ore deposits in the form of four surficial deposits. The main hematitic ore is medium- to fine-grained and displays a variety of massive, banded and porous textures. It occurs in lenses and sheets, within the Awband Formation. The thickness of the lenses has been indicated by drilling to be up to 100 m (330 ft), while the depth of mineralisation is untested 180 m (590 ft) below surface. There are two main ore groups: unoxidised primary ores and semi-oxidised ores. The primary ores occur below 100 m (330 ft) and consist of magnetite and pyrite, and up to 5% chalcopyrite and pyrrhotite. The oxidised ores, extending up to 130 m (430 ft) below ground surface, consist mainly of magnetite, martite and hydrogoethite. Two other oxidised ore types, hydrogoethite/hematite/semi-martite and carbonate/semi-martite, occur sporadically in small amounts in the deposit. Alteration that may be related to the mineralising event has been observed within the host rocks, and includes sericitisation, silicification and carbonisation.

== Exploration ==
Iron occurrences were observed during initial geological mapping of the area in the mid thirties but the economical potential was not fully recognised until a joint Afghan-Soviet project, between 1963 and 1965, carried out an extensive study which mapped and described the deposit in some detail. The regional geology was mapped at 1:50 000 while the Hajigak deposit was mapped at 1:10 000. Focusing on the western area of the deposit, the study included detailed prospecting, trenching, ore sampling, four deep drillholes, a 200 m-long (660 ft) horizontal adit and shafts into the fragmental ore. For two of the main ore bodies, I and II, horizontal plans and vertical crosssections were generated allowing the ore to be resource classified.

== Development ==
The remote and mountainous location of Hajigak makes it a challenging project for future development. However, the large tonnage and high iron content make it attractive to companies with the proven ability to plan and develop large world-class mines in demanding areas. The deposit remains untested below 180 m and there is a potential for ore at greater depth. Additional prospects and mineral occurrences over a 60 km-long (37 mi) strike, at Darrah-i-Nil, Khesh, Zerak, Kharkiza, SurkhiParsa, further increase the potential of the area. A feasibility study for the exploitation of the Hajigak deposit was undertaken in 1972 by a Franco-German group, Nenot-Pic. This proposed the construction of a blast furnace, based on the occurrence nearby of coking coal, providing an opportunity for the creation of an integrated iron and steel plant.

=== Summary of Hajigak deposit ===
- A world-class iron ore deposit.
- Estimated resource of two billion tonnes at approximately 62% Fe.
- Sixteen ore bodies extending for up to 3 km and 100 m thick.
- Amenable to open pitting.
- Coal resource nearby suitable for blast furnace/smelting.

== Award of concessions ==
In November 2011, the Afghan government has awarded four out of the five blocks at Hajigak to a consortium of seven Indian firms led by the Steel Authority of India (SAIL) and one block to Canada's Kilo Goldmines.

== Indian Government's Hajigak Mining Plan ==
Indian and Pakistani embassy and consulates in Afghanistan in red

In May 2016, India, Iran and Afghanistan signed an agreement to develop two berths at Port of Chabahar, build new Chabahar-Zahedan railway as part of North–South Transport Corridor by linking it with Trans-Iranian Railway, invest up to INR 1 lakh crore (US$14 billion) in the Chabahar Special Economic zone by building gas and urea plant as well as other industries, this will also be linked with Chabahar-Zaranj-Delaram-Hajigak railway: 900 km-long (560 mi) Indian-Iranian project, would link future US$10 billion Indian iron-ore mining operations at Hajigak, in Afghanistan to Chabahar, Iran.

== See also ==
- Ashgabat Agreement
- Turkmenistan–Afghanistan–Pakistan–India Pipeline
- Afghanistan rail network
- Mining concession
- Rail transport in Afghanistan
- Rail transport in Iran
- North-South Transport Corridor
- Rail transport in Kazakhstan
- Rail transport in India
- Rail transport in Oman
- Rail transport in Tajikistan
- Rail transport in Turkmenistan
- Rail transport in Uzbekistan
