= Daymirdad District =

Settlement in Maidan Wardak Province, Afghanistan

Daymirdad دایمیرداد
- District
- Location in Afghanistan
- Coordinates: 34.2164°N 68.2952°E
- Country: Afghanistan
- Province: Maidan Wardak
- Capital: Miran
- Time zone: + 4.30

Daymirdad (Pashto: دایمیرداد) is a district in the south of Maidan Wardak Province, Afghanistan. The capital of the district is Miran. The district is populated mainly by the Hazara ethnic group.

== Demographics and population ==
Like in the rest of Afghanistan, no exact population numbers are available. The Afghan Ministry of Rural Rehabilitation & Development (MRRD) along with UNHCR and Central Statistics Office (CSO) of Afghanistan estimates the population of the district to be around 28,865. According to AIMS and UNHCR, Hazaras make up the majority of the population at 90% and the rest 10% others.

== Geography ==
Daymirdad is located in the south of Maidan Wardak Province. To the north it borders Markazi Behsud, and Jalrez, to the south Chak, to the east Nirkh, to the west Nawur district of Ghazni Province.

Daymirdad is home to some historical forts and towers. Arg, which is located between Moka and Dadakhel, Para Qala, Kafer Qala which is located in Bubak and Kafer Qala, which is located in Chatoo. Daymirdad is an agricultural district that has apples and apricot orchard.
