= Kuchi–Hazara conflict =

Series of conflicts over Hazarajat

Kuchi–Hazara conflict, also called the Kuchi–Hazara dispute, is the series of conflicts between Kuchis and Hazaras over the lands in Hazarajat, the central highlands of Afghanistan, since the early 18th century. After the establishment of new Afghan Government, these conflicts have turned into war between Hazaras and Kuchis. The conflicts have left tens of people dead, hundreds injured and thousands internally displaced in recent years.

== History ==
During the early 18th century when Ghilzai Pashtuns were first independent of Safavid dynasty and began migration into pastures of Hazarajat and pushing Hazaras toward west.

== The Behsud conflicts ==
The Behsud districts (both Behsud 1 and Behsud 2) of Maidan Wardak province are predominantly Hazara populated where the Kuchis are stopped to enter further in Hazarajat. The prevention has cost tens of lives, leaving hundreds injured and thousands internally displaced in the recent years.

=== Casualties ===
Tens of people have been killed, hundreds injured and thousands are internally displaced during the conflicts in Behsud.

=== Protests and reactions ===
In 2009, Haji Muhammad Mohaqiq, leader of People's Islamic Unity Party of Afghanistan, went on a hunger strike. In 2010, many Hazara MPs walked out the session of House of the people to protest the clashes in Behsud.

=== Peace agreement ===
In 2011, an agreement was signed between the elders of Hazaras and Kuchis during a meeting in Kabul to resolve the conflict, the agreement was also endorsed by Governor of Maidan Wardak province, Mohammad Halim Fidai. The agreement soon after violated.

== See also ==
- Hazara people
- Kuchi people
- Hazarajat
- Pashtun colonization of northern Afghanistan
