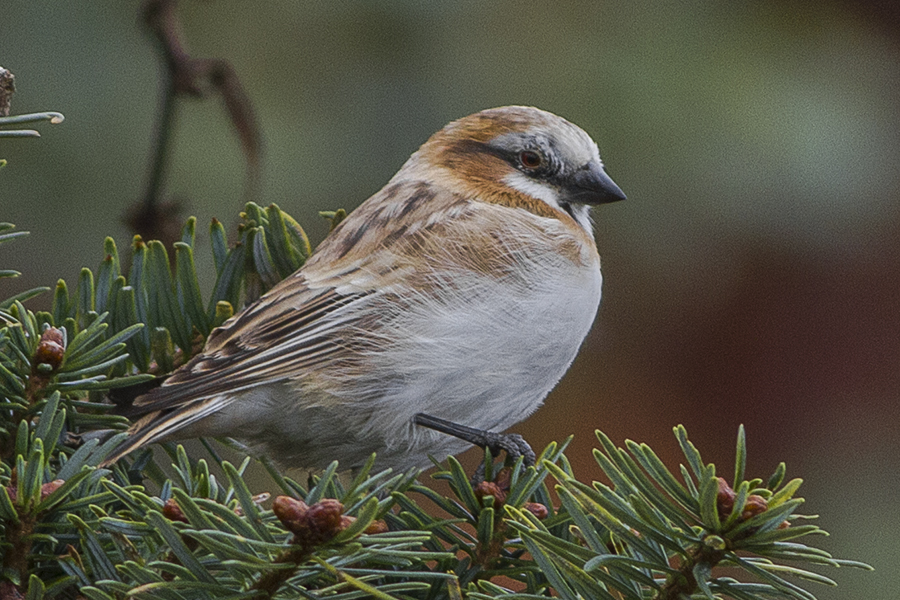
- From Pangolakha Wildlife Sanctuary in East Sikkim, India.

Conservation status
- Least Concern (IUCN 3.1)

Scientific classification
- Kingdom: Animalia
- Phylum: Chordata
- Class: Aves
- Order: Passeriformes
- Family: Passeridae
- Genus: Pyrgilauda
- Species: P. ruficollis

Binomial name
- Pyrgilauda ruficollis (Blanford, 1871)

Synonyms
- Montifringilla ruficollis

= Rufous-necked snowfinch =

Species of bird

The rufous-necked snowfinch (Pyrgilauda ruficollis) is a species of bird in the sparrow family.

== Identification ==
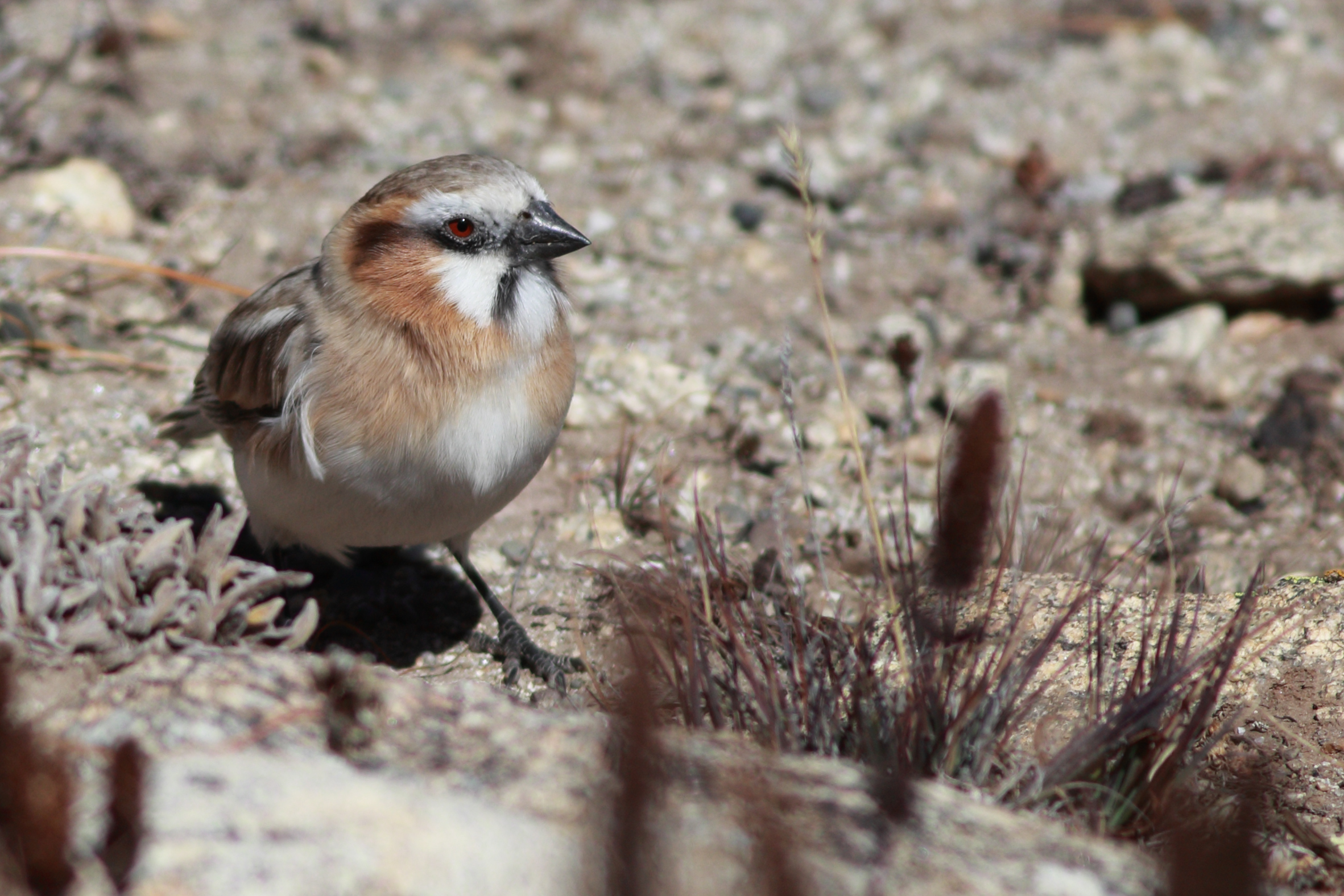
From North Sikkim, India.

These birds are around 15cm and are very distinctive in their zone. Quite brightly colored for a snowfinch, adults and juveniles are distinguished because of their appearance. Adults have black lores and whitish faces except for their chestnut or reddish-brown rear ear-coverts and sides of neck. The rest of the plumage is light brown, straked darker on mantle and scapulars. The wings have two white wingbars formed by the tips of the coverts. Juveniles are paler than adults, without a well-defined face pattern.

It can be confused with Blanford's snowfinch, but Pyrgilauda ruficollis has two black stripes on the face. They also have evolved a higher rate of metabolism than most other birds, a better tolerance of low temperatures, and a greater capacity for moving.

== Voice ==
Pyrgilauda ruficollis has a soft voice and a chattering alarm call. It also emits buzzing noises while flying.

== Behaviour ==
It is locally very common, usually found in the breeding season in close association with mouse-hares or pikas, in whose burrows it breeds and hides. When breeding season is over, it is more likely to be found in small flocks, when it ranges over a wide variety of mountainous terrain in company of other finches like Blanford's snowfinches.

Flight is weak and low, and rarely over long distances. It feeds on the ground, on a variety of small seeds and insects.

== Distribution and habitat ==
It is naturally found in Tibet and adjacent areas of central and western China, in the alpine temperate grassland and barren stony steppes and plateaus; it winters south to Uttarakhand, Nepal, Sikkim and Bhutan, sometimes to lower altitudes. Therefore, it is found on wide, open steppe meadows, pastures and near human settlements.

They are mainly sedentary, only making irregular altitudinal movements in response to particularly bad weather conditions and never doing long-distance movements.
