= Rish Khor prison =

Prison in Afghanistan

Rish Khor is a prison on an Afghan military base that former captives report was run by Americans. It is part of the Rish Khor camp.

Anand Gopal, writing in the Asia Times, quoted Rehmatullah Muhammad, one of nine men from a mountain village named Zaiwalat in Wardak who recounted being seized by Americans in a midnight raid in 2009, and then being taken to Rish Khor for interrogation. He said his American interrogators did not wear uniforms, and that he and his fellow villagers were handcuffed and locked in a steel shipping container, when not being interrogated. His interrogators accused the villagers of giving food and shelter to the Taliban.

Even though Rehmatullah Muhammad says he was then forwarded to the United States' Bagram Theater Internment Facility—where he was held for a further four months, Gopal reports the US military has denied all knowledge of a detention facility at Rish Khor. According to Gopal:

"Afghan human-rights campaigners worry that US forces may be using secret detention sites like Rish Khor to carry out interrogations away from prying eyes. The US military, however, denies even having knowledge of the facility."

== See also ==
- List of prisons in Afghanistan
