= Hajigak Pass =

Mountain pass in Afghanistan

- Kotal e Hajigak; Hazaragi: کوتل حاجيگک
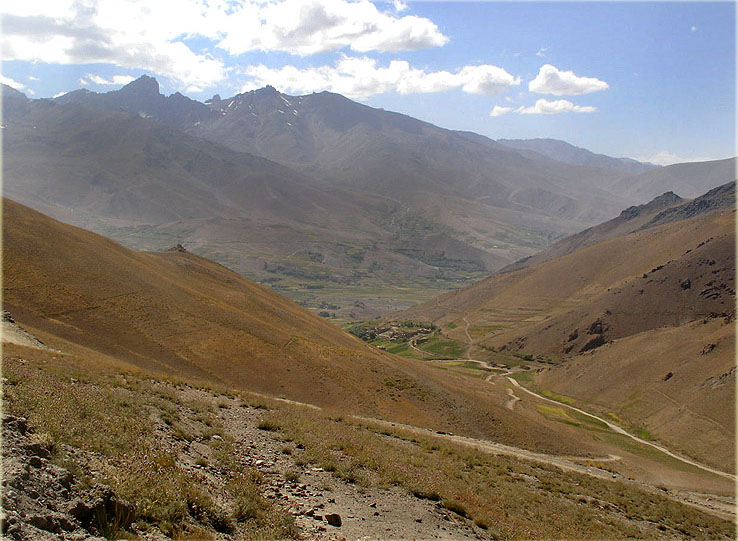
- Interactive map of Hajigak Pass
- Elevation: 3,475 m (11,401 ft)

Third Approach
- Location: Maidan Wardak, Afghanistan
- Coordinates: 34°39′32″N 68°5′14.1″E

The Hajigak Pass (Hazaragi: حاجیگک hajji gak 'little pilgrim') is a mountain pass of Afghanistan. It is situated at a height of 3,700 metres (12,100 ft) above sea-level in the northern part of Maidan Wardak province, connecting it with Bamyan province to the northwest. It is one of the two main routes from Kabul to Bamyan in Hazarajat, leading across the Koh-i-Baba range.

== Climate ==
The climate in this area is classified as a subarctic (Dsc) in the Köppen climate classification system. Avalanches, heavy snowfalls and landslides can occur anytime and can sometimes block some sections of the road, being extremely dangerous due to frequent patches of ice.

Climate data for Hajigak Pass
Month	Jan	Feb	Mar	Apr	May	Jun	Jul	Aug	Sep	Oct	Nov	Dec	Year
Daily mean °C (°F)	−10.6 (12.9)	−11.1 (12.0)	−5.0 (23.0)	0.8 (33.4)	5.6 (42.1)	10.6 (51.1)	12.4 (54.3)	11.4 (52.5)	7.6 (45.7)	1.8 (35.2)	−4.3 (24.3)	−7.4 (18.7)	1.0 (33.8)
Average precipitation mm (inches)	43.4 (1.71)	92.4 (3.64)	83.9 (3.30)	79.1 (3.11)	54.2 (2.13)	30.7 (1.21)	15.1 (0.59)	30.5 (1.20)	24.0 (0.94)	36.5 (1.44)	28.9 (1.14)	16.7 (0.66)	535.4 (21.07)
Average relative humidity (%)	72	79	79	58	45	33	29	31	28	33	52	58	50
Source 1: ClimateCharts,
Source 2: World Weather Online (Humidity)

== Routes ==
The two main routes from Kabul to Bamyan are from the south via Maidan Wardak and the Hajigak Pass, and from the north via Parwan and the Shibar Pass. The journey via the Shibar Pass is approximately 6 and half hours long covering around 237 km (147 mi) long. The Shibar pass is still preferred over the Hajigak pass on safety grounds, because in the harsh climate of the area the Hajigak remain covered with snow during most of the year.

The Hajigak route leaves Kabul from Kote Sangi, about 1 km west of Kabul University, and follows the paved highway to Ghazni west and then south into Maidan Wardak province. There the route leaves the Ghazni highway, turning right to head west through Maidan Shar, the capital of Maidan Wardak province. It continues through Jalrez, Sarchashman, Sia Sang, and Duz Qol, before crossing the Unai Pass to Gardan Diwal, where the route again turns to the right to head north, and finally start the climb to the Hajigak Pass proper.

There are numerous villages in this sparsely populated, rugged area. The greenness of the trees and the clearness of the air in the valleys greet tourists who travel to Bamyan. In the fall and spring large camel caravans add their particular color and excitement to the scene.

The major wildlife is lammergeier (Gypaetus barbatus) which are often seen squatting in large groups beside the road. These very large birds are also known as Bearded Vultures for they have very noticeable, rather comical goatees. Having a passion for bone marrow, they have been seen to carry animal bones to a height and carefully drop them onto rocks to crack them so that they can feast upon the marrow with greedy delight.

== Railway projects ==
In May 2016, India, Iran and Afghanistan signed an agreement to develop two berths at the Port of Chabahar, build the new Chabahar-Zahedan railway line as part of the North–South Transport Corridor by linking it with the Trans-Iranian Railway, and invest up to INR 1 lakh crore (US$14 billion) in the Chabahar Special Economic zone by building a gas-based urea plant as well as other industries there. The proposed railway line will be linked with the Chabahar-Zaranj-Delaram-Hajigak railway, a 900 km long Indian-Iranian project that will link the future US$10 billion Indian iron-ore mining operations at the Hajigak to the Chabahar port.

== See also ==
- Unai Pass
- Shibar Pass
- Hajigak mining concession
