= List of prisons in Afghanistan =

There are between 24 and 77 prisons in Afghanistan. As of 2023, the total number of prisoners in the country is approximately 14,000 of which up to 1,100 are females. The following is an incomplete list of prisons in Afghanistan:

Prisons in Afghanistan
Prison	Status	Classification	Managed	Opened	Capacity	Location
Parwan Detention Facility	Operational	Maximum	Ministry of Defense	2009	?	Bagram
Pul-e-Charkhi prison	Operational	Minimum	Ministry of Interior	1980s	5,000	Kabul
Herat Prison	Operational	Minimum	Ministry of Interior	?	2,000	Herat
Kandahar Prison	Operational	Minimum	Ministry of Interior	?	1,900	Kandahar
Nangarhar Prison	Operational	Minimum	Ministry of Interior	?	1,700	Jalalabad
Balkh Prison	Operational	Minimum	Ministry of Interior	?	?	Mazar-i-Sharif
Ghazni Prison	Operational	Minimum	Ministry of Interior	?	500	Ghazni
Khost Prison	Operational	Minimum	Ministry of Interior	?	500	Khost
Kunduz Prison	Operational	Minimum	Ministry of Interior	?	Over 500	Kunduz
Helmand Prison	Operational	Minimum	Ministry of Interior	?	?	Lashkar Gah
Salt Pit	Closed	?	United States	?	?	?
Dark prison	Closed	?	United States	?	?	?
Total capacity					20,000	(current)

== See also ==
- Black jail
- Capital punishment in Afghanistan
- Do Ab prison
- List of countries by incarceration rate
- Mazari Sharif prison
- Qala-i-Jangi
- Rish Khor prison
- Sheberghan Prison
