= Behsud, Maidan Wardak =

Town in Maidan Wardak Province, Afghanistan

Behsud بهسود
- Town
- Location in Afghanistan
- Coordinates: 34.3436°N 67.9057°E
- Country: Afghanistan
- Province: Maidan Wardak
- District: Markazi Behsud
- Elevation: 2,981 m (9,780 ft)

Population
  - Total: 4,619
- Time zone: UTC+4:30 (Afghanistan Standard Time)

Behsūd (Dari: بهسود) is a town in Maidan Wardak province in central Afghanistan. It is the administrative center of Markazi Behsud District. The town of Behsud has a population of about 4,619.

== Geography and climate ==
Behsud is located about 2,981 metres (9,780 ft) above sea level.

In the Maidan Wardak province, there are two neighboring districts in the northwest which are called Behsud.

- Behsud is also spelt as Bihsud, Behsood or Bihsood.
- The two districts are called Markazi Behsud (Central Behsud or Behsud 2) and Hesa Awal Behsud (Behsud 1).

The two districts of Behsud are the followings

- Behsud 1 has 520 villages, with the estimated population of 5,817 families of 56,129 persons; its Distract Governor is Baqir Noor.
- Behsud 2 has 920 villages and sub-villages with the estimated population of 113,295 individuals; its distract governor is Mahram Ali Fahimi.

It is also worth mentioning that, both Behsud's governors are closely associated with Hizb-e-Wahdat (Karim Khalili).

=== Climate ===
Behsud is located in the country's central highlands which experiences long and extremely harsh winter. It is classified in the Köppen climate classification as a warm-summer humid continental climate (Köppen climate classification: Dsb).

Climate data for Markaz-e Behsud (2009-present)
Month	Jan	Feb	Mar	Apr	May	Jun	Jul	Aug	Sep	Oct	Nov	Dec	Year
Record high °C (°F)	3 (37)	3 (37)	15 (59)	21 (70)	23 (73)	29 (84)	31 (88)	28 (82)	27 (81)	22 (72)	12 (54)	6 (43)	31 (88)
Mean daily maximum °C (°F)	−5.4 (22.3)	−3.9 (25.0)	0.2 (32.4)	8.6 (47.5)	15.0 (59.0)	19.4 (66.9)	22.6 (72.7)	21.4 (70.5)	18.3 (64.9)	12.0 (53.6)	3.3 (37.9)	−2.4 (27.7)	9.1 (48.4)
Daily mean °C (°F)	−11.8 (10.8)	−10.3 (13.5)	−4.9 (23.2)	4.3 (39.7)	10.4 (50.7)	13.7 (56.7)	16.7 (62.1)	15.6 (60.1)	12.4 (54.3)	6.3 (43.3)	−1.1 (30.0)	−7.4 (18.7)	3.7 (38.6)
Mean daily minimum °C (°F)	−18.2 (−0.8)	−16.7 (1.9)	−10.0 (14.0)	0.0 (32.0)	5.8 (42.4)	8.0 (46.4)	10.8 (51.4)	9.7 (49.5)	6.4 (43.5)	0.6 (33.1)	−5.4 (22.3)	−12.4 (9.7)	−1.8 (28.8)
Record low °C (°F)	−33 (−27)	−34 (−29)	−27 (−17)	−16 (3)	−3 (27)	0 (32)	4 (39)	2 (36)	−3 (27)	−14 (7)	−17 (1)	−29 (−20)	−34 (−29)
Average precipitation mm (inches)	43.1 (1.70)	81.1 (3.19)	60.4 (2.38)	71.0 (2.80)	71.6 (2.82)	14.8 (0.58)	10.7 (0.42)	11.5 (0.45)	7.0 (0.28)	12.4 (0.49)	34.6 (1.36)	17.0 (0.67)	435.2 (17.14)
Average snowfall cm (inches)	41.9 (16.5)	77.6 (30.6)	56.1 (22.1)	35.7 (14.1)	2.6 (1.0)	0.4 (0.2)	0.0 (0.0)	0.0 (0.0)	0.2 (0.1)	5.2 (2.0)	32.6 (12.8)	16.4 (6.5)	268.7 (105.9)
Source: World Weather Online

== Demographics ==
A majority of the population are Hazaras with some Kochis (Pashtun nomads). The area has been a site of Hazara-Kochi conflict.

The majority Hazara population of Behsud is from the Behsudi tribe.

Maidan Wardak is a mountainous province which contains a diverse population. Hazaras are occupying the northern and western while Durrani Pashutans and Ghilzai are inhabiting the southern part of the province.

The ethnic composition of Behsud is mostly Hazaras. Both districts have 95% of Hazaras and 18 different tribes who get elected as leaders of Shura.

== The Conflict Between Hazaras and Kochis in Behsud ==
The battle between Hazaras and Kochis in Maidan Wardak province dates back to Abdur Rahman's dictatorship at the close of the nineteenth century, and the state's policy of securing control of Afghanistan's Hazara-dominated central provinces (Hazarajat).

This is also a series on the Kuchi-hazara conflicts.

Before Abdur Rahman took control of Afghanistan, the Hazara people in the country's central regions were reasonably self-sufficient. Many Hazaras were slaughtered or forced to flee the area under his reign, while Kuchis aligned with Abdur Rahman were granted grazing rights in the area.

The Hazaras were later permitted to return to these lands under Habibullah Khan's administration, for a variety of reasons, one of which being that the Kochis, who had previously been granted permission to utilize the land, notified the authorities that they were unable to cultivate it. As a result, Kochi's rights were taken away by the PDPA rule, but they were reestablished by the Taliban regime.

Since 2007, the conflict between these two groups has intensified, with periodic violent attacks, particularly in the two districts of Behsud, Maidan Wardak province. In the years 2007, 2008, and 2010, around ten persons were killed, according to reports. Furthermore, significant material damage and numerous thefts have been observed. It's also worth noting that according to a UNHCR email from 2010, more than 1800 households were forced to leave the region in May 2010.

Establishment of a Mediation Council (April 2022): In an effort to address the longstanding disputes between the Hazara and Kuchi communities in Maidan Wardak Province, a 20-member council was formed under the directive of Governor Mohammad Amin Omar. This council, led by Syed Hashim Jawadi Balkhabi and based in Behsud, aims to find comprehensive solutions to the conflicts between the two groups.

Despite this initiative, underlying tensions remain unresolved. Periodic confrontations have continued to occur during seasonal Kuchi migrations, though detailed and verified reports specific to Behsud since 2022 are limited.
