= Miran, Afghanistan =

Settlement in Maidan Wardak Province, Afghanistan

Miran میران
- Location in Afghanistan
- Coordinates: 34.2204°N 68.3126°E
- Country: Afghanistan
- Province: Maidan Wardak
- District: Dai Mirdad
- Elevation: 2,812 m (9,226 ft)

Population
  - Total: 2,760
- Time zone: UTC+4:30 (Afghanistan Standard Time)

Mīrān (Pashto: ميران) is a town in Maidan Wardak Province, central Afghanistan. It is the administrative center of Dai Mirdad District. Miran has a population about 2,760.

== Geography ==
Miran is located 2,812 m above sea level.

=== Climate ===
Miran has a warm-summer humid continental climate (Köppen climate classification: Dsb) with warm, dry summers and cold winters.

Climate data for Panjab, Bamyan Province
Month	Jan	Feb	Mar	Apr	May	Jun	Jul	Aug	Sep	Oct	Nov	Dec	Year
Mean daily maximum °C (°F)	−1.8 (28.8)	−0.4 (31.3)	5.9 (42.6)	13.2 (55.8)	17.7 (63.9)	22.6 (72.7)	24.9 (76.8)	24.6 (76.3)	21.0 (69.8)	14.8 (58.6)	8.7 (47.7)	2.4 (36.3)	12.8 (55.1)
Daily mean °C (°F)	−7.7 (18.1)	−6.1 (21.0)	0.5 (32.9)	7.2 (45.0)	11.0 (51.8)	15.2 (59.4)	17.5 (63.5)	16.8 (62.2)	12.5 (54.5)	7.0 (44.6)	1.6 (34.9)	−3.5 (25.7)	6.0 (42.8)
Mean daily minimum °C (°F)	−13.7 (7.3)	−11.8 (10.8)	−4.9 (23.2)	1.2 (34.2)	4.3 (39.7)	7.8 (46.0)	10.1 (50.2)	9.0 (48.2)	4.0 (39.2)	−0.8 (30.6)	−5.5 (22.1)	−9.4 (15.1)	−0.8 (30.6)
Average precipitation mm (inches)	37 (1.5)	52 (2.0)	69 (2.7)	66 (2.6)	40 (1.6)	5 (0.2)	3 (0.1)	1 (0.0)	1 (0.0)	8 (0.3)	20 (0.8)	31 (1.2)	333 (13)
Source: weather2visit.com

== Demographics ==
A majority of the population are Pashtuns. The main language spoken in the town are the Wardag dialect of Pashto.
