= Kot-e Ashro =

Kot-e-Ashro کوټه عښرو
- Town
- Location in Afghanistan
- Coordinates: 34°26′57″N 68°47′38″E
- Country: Afghanistan
- Province: Maidan Wardak
- District: Jalrez
- Time zone: UTC+04:30

Kot-e-Ashro (also Kotah-ye `Ashro, Kot-i-Ashro, Kuteh-Ashro), (Pashto: کوټه عښرو) is a small town in the western Paghman Mountains of Jalrez District, Maidan Wardak Province, Afghanistan. It was formerly the district capital until it was taken by the Taliban in 2006. The town lies along the Kabul–Behsud Highway, 14.6 kilometres (9.1 mi) by road northwest of Maidan Shar.

== History ==
During the Soviet–Afghan War it was a stronghold of the mujahideen. They held their fort at Kot-e Ashro until 1987, when they were forced to surrender to the Soviets. Some 450 mujahideen were executed upon the orders of a Soviet commander.

In 2006, the Taliban captured the town, and it ceased to be the capital of Jalrez district.

In late July to early August 2012, 11 citizens of the Hazara ethnic group were brutally tortured and beheaded by the Taliban in Kot-e-Ashro. In one incident on August 1, five people were forced off a vehicle and killed together.
