= Shibar Pass =

- د شبر کوتل کوتال ای شیبار
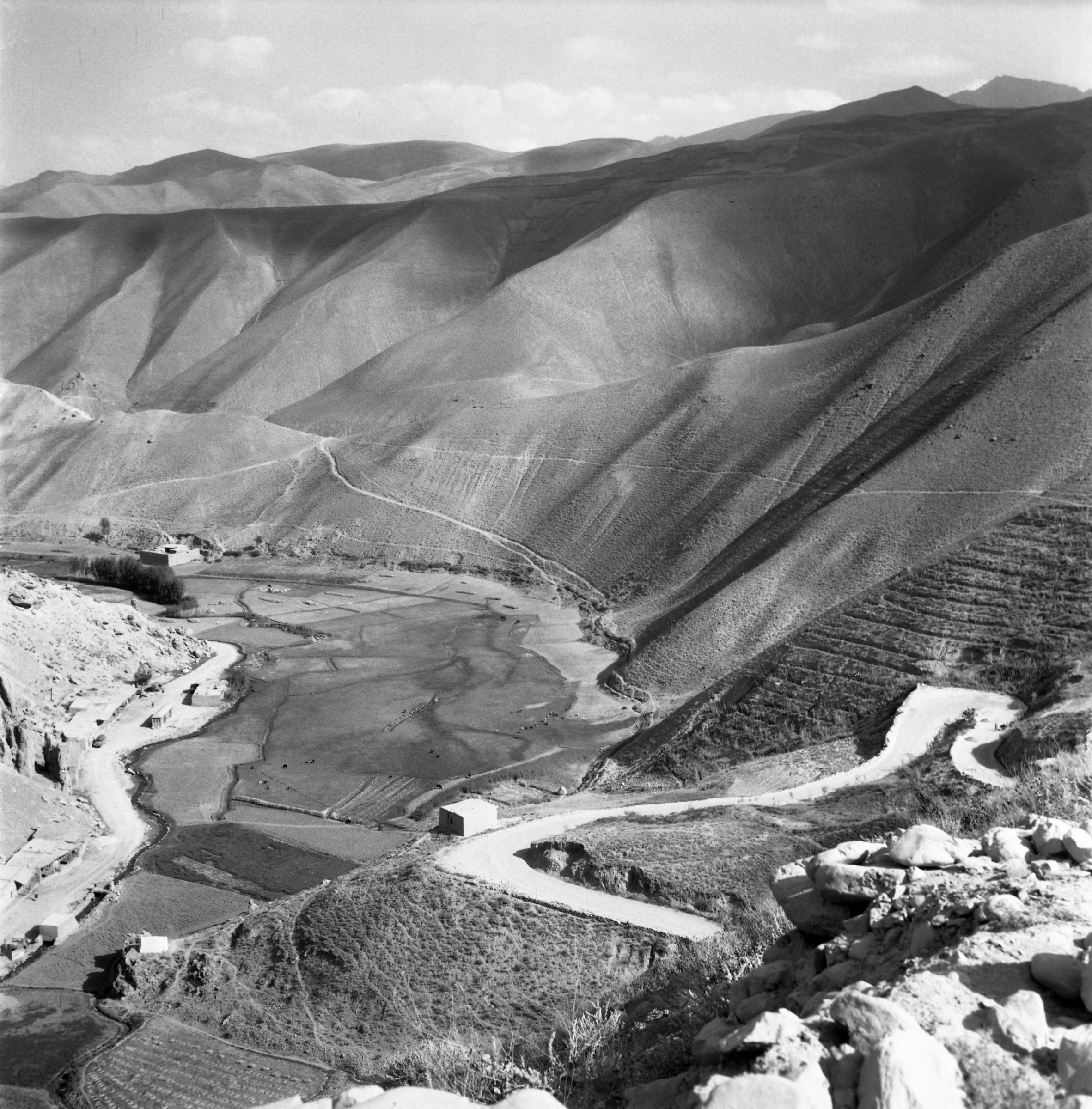
- Shibar pass in 1961
- Interactive map of Shibar Pass
- Elevation: 3,000 m (9,800 ft)

Location
- Location: Afghanistan
- Range: Hindu Kush
- Coordinates: 34°54′26.65″N 68°15′36.58″E

Shibar Pass (Note: Pashto: د شبر کوتل Dari: کوتال ای شیبار) in Afghanistan is situated at a height of 3,000 metres (9,800 ft) above sea-level, connecting Parwan Province with Bamyan Province. It is the longer of the two main routes from Kabul to Bamiyan. The journey is approximately 6 and half hours long covering around 237 km (147 mi). It was originally designed and built by Ahmad Shah Shairzay and a German engineer between 1933 and 1938. It is noted to be an important mountain pass of the country.

The route to Bamyan via the Unai Pass and Hajigak Pass in Maidan Wardak is shorter and more direct. However, it is also more difficult on account of the elevation of the terrain, rising to 3,700 m. Because of this, the Shibar Pass is sometimes preferred in winter.
