= Kabul–Kandahar Highway =

National highway in Afghanistan

Coordinates: 32.778768°N 67.721949°E

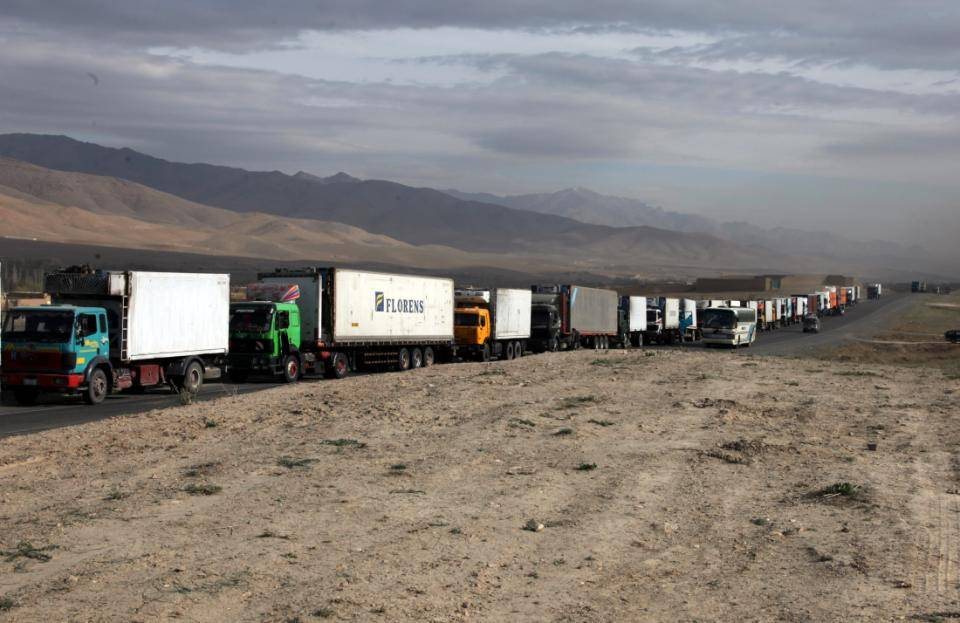
- Kabul-Kandahar Highway at Saydabad District of Maidan Wardak in 2010

Location
- Country: Afghanistan

Highway system
- Transport in Afghanistan

The Kabul–Kandahar Highway (NH0101) is a 483 km (300 mi)-long two-lane and in some areas a four-lane road that links Afghanistan's two largest cities, Kabul and Kandahar. It starts from the Company Bridge area in western Kabul and passes through Maidan Shar, Saydabad, Ghazni, and Qalat before reaching Ayno Maina in Kandahar. It is currently being rehabilitated at four separate locations, between Kabul and Ghazni. This highway is a key portion of Afghanistan's "National Highway 1". It has a total of five truck scales, with two in Maidan Wardak Province, one in Ghazni Province, one in Zabul Province, and one in Kandahar Province.

== History ==
The modern Kabul–Kandahar Highway was designed and asphalted in the 1960s by Afghan and American engineers under contracts with the United States International Cooperation Administration. This was a time when the Soviet Union and the United States were competing for dominance in Afghanistan. In those years the highway was used mostly by trucks and couch buses due to the scarcity of private vehicles. In the 1980s, military convoys of the Democratic Republic of Afghanistan and Soviet Union were often seen passing on this highway. It began deteriorating after the resignation of President Mohammad Najibullah and the establishment of the Islamic State of Afghanistan in 1992. By late 2001 the highway was in its worst condition.

In September 2002, during the government under President Hamid Karzai, the United States funded the repair and rebuilding of 389 km (242 mi) of the highway (at a cost of about $190 million), while Japan funded 50 km (31 mi). Only about 43 km (27 mi) of the highway was usable prior to the repairs. The contract to rebuild the highway was awarded to the Louis Berger Group, a private American company based in New Jersey, which completed the work with Afghan-American, Turkish, and Indian subcontractors. Phase one of the paving was completed in December 2003.

In 2022, due to the increase of head-on collisions, the current government decided to turn it into a modern divided highway. Work soon began on different sections of the highway between Kabul and Kandahar. Construction of a temporary toll plaza began in Kabul Province in late 2022. Other toll plazas are being completed in Kandahar Province.

In 2025, construction began on major bus terminals next to the highway. One is in the Arghandi area of Kabul Province and the other in Daman District of Kandahar Province. Currently, the Dashte Barchi bus station provides transport services to the provinces of Maidan Wardak, Bamyan, Ghazni, Daikundi and Ghor. Another such bus station is currently next to Kandahar's Ayno Maina. The terminals are being built by the Ministry of Transport and Civil Aviation.

Opening ceremony of the highway, 1960

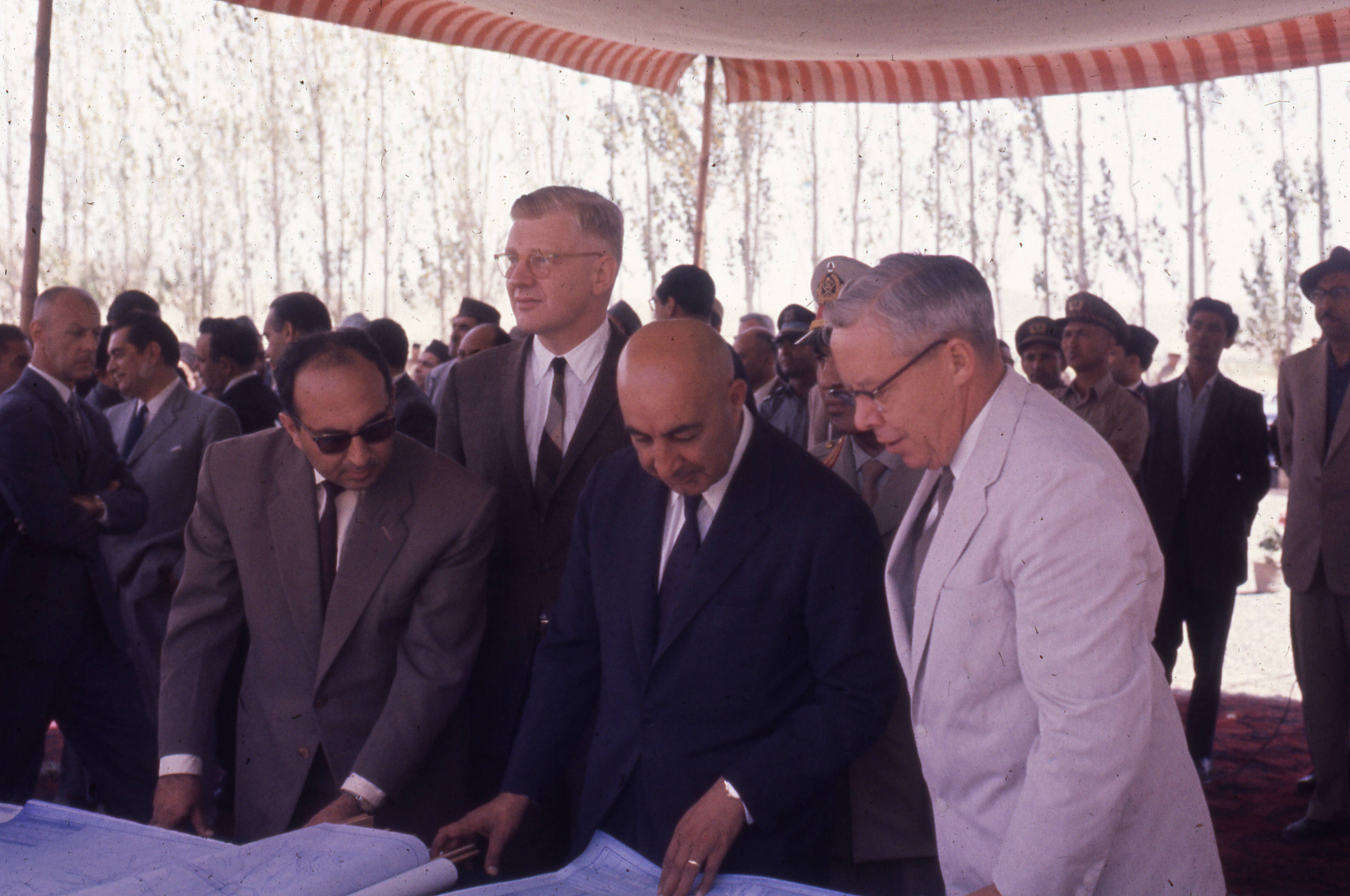
Prime minister Mohammad Daoud Khan at the opening

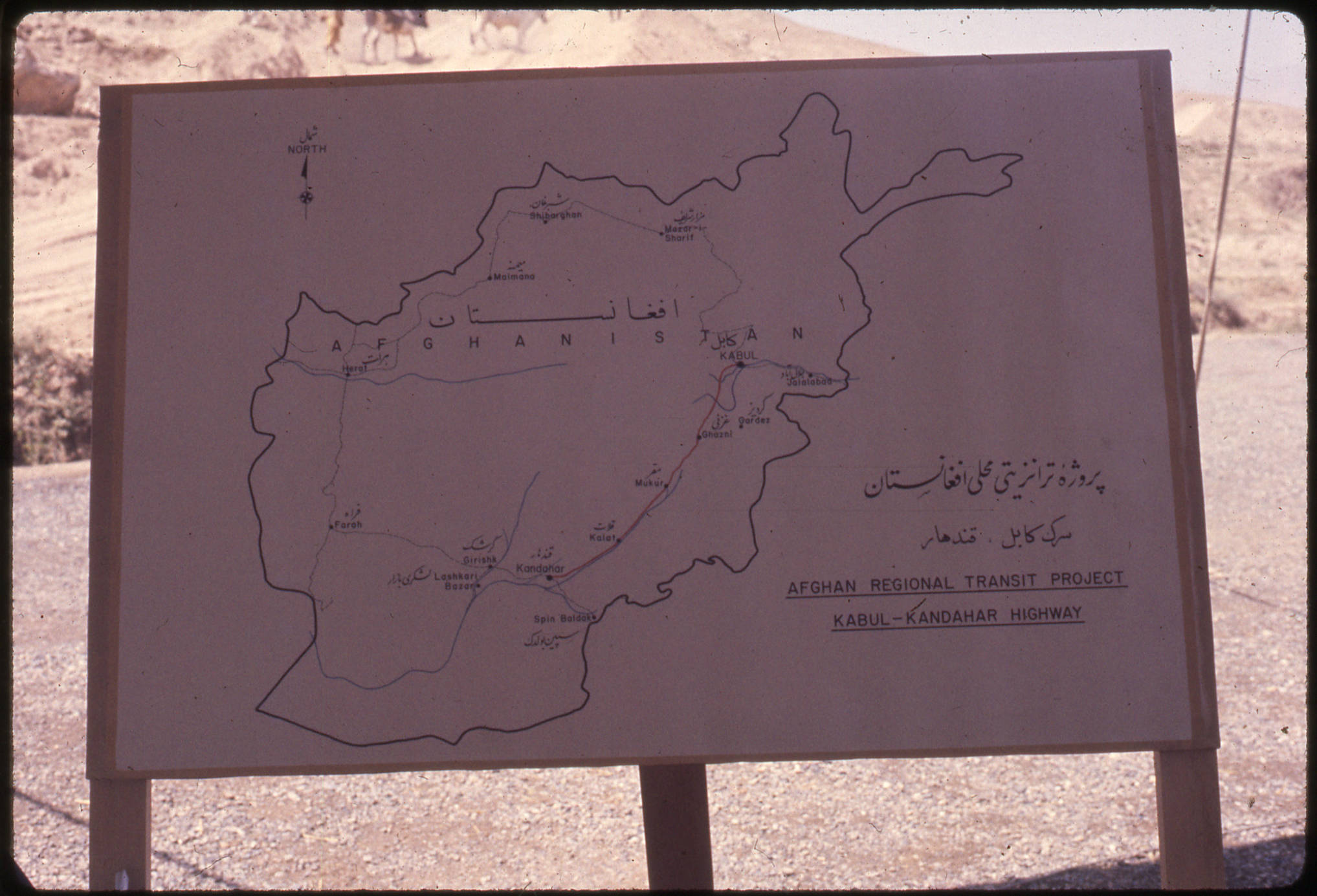
Map exhibited

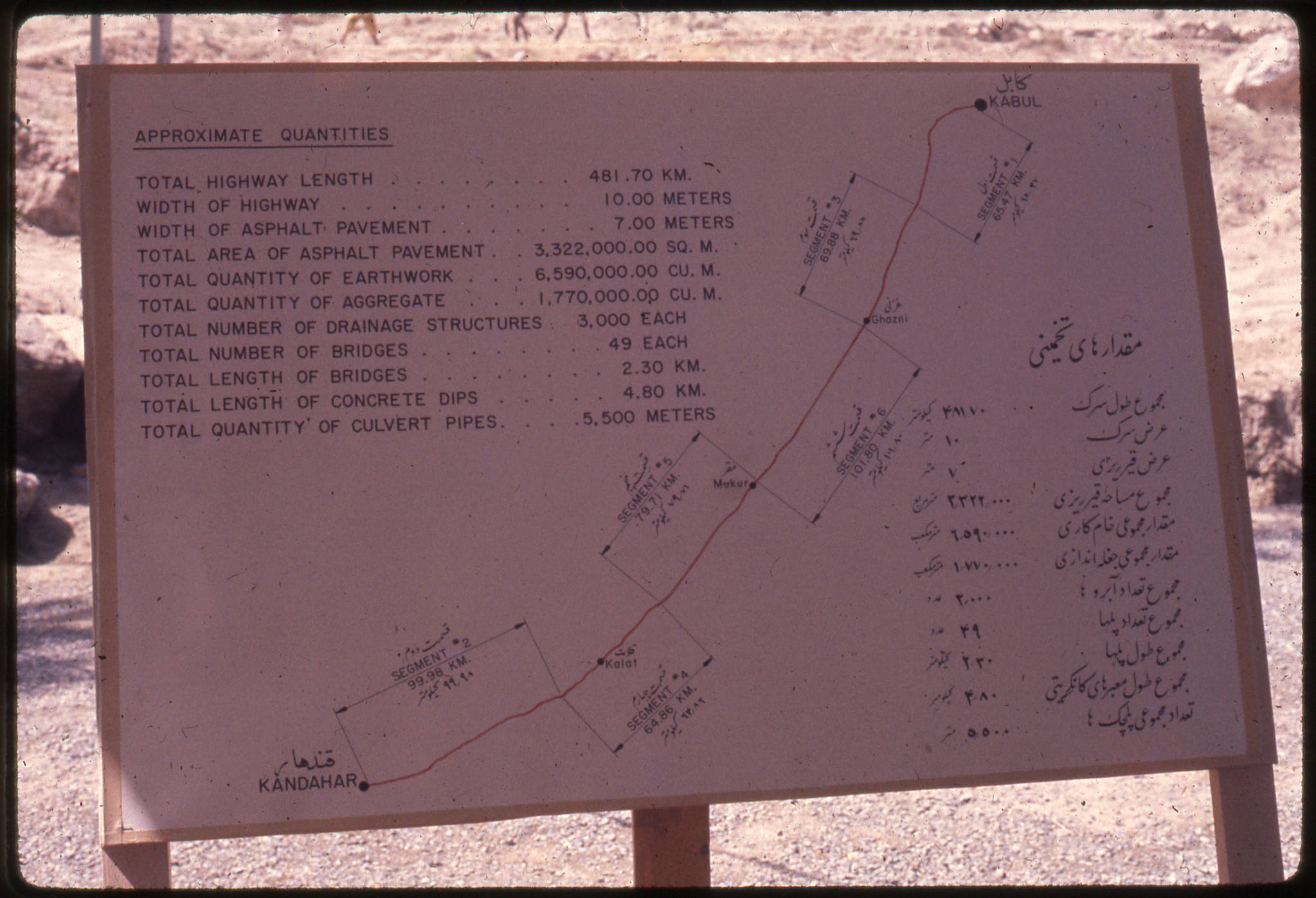
Exhibits showing construction details

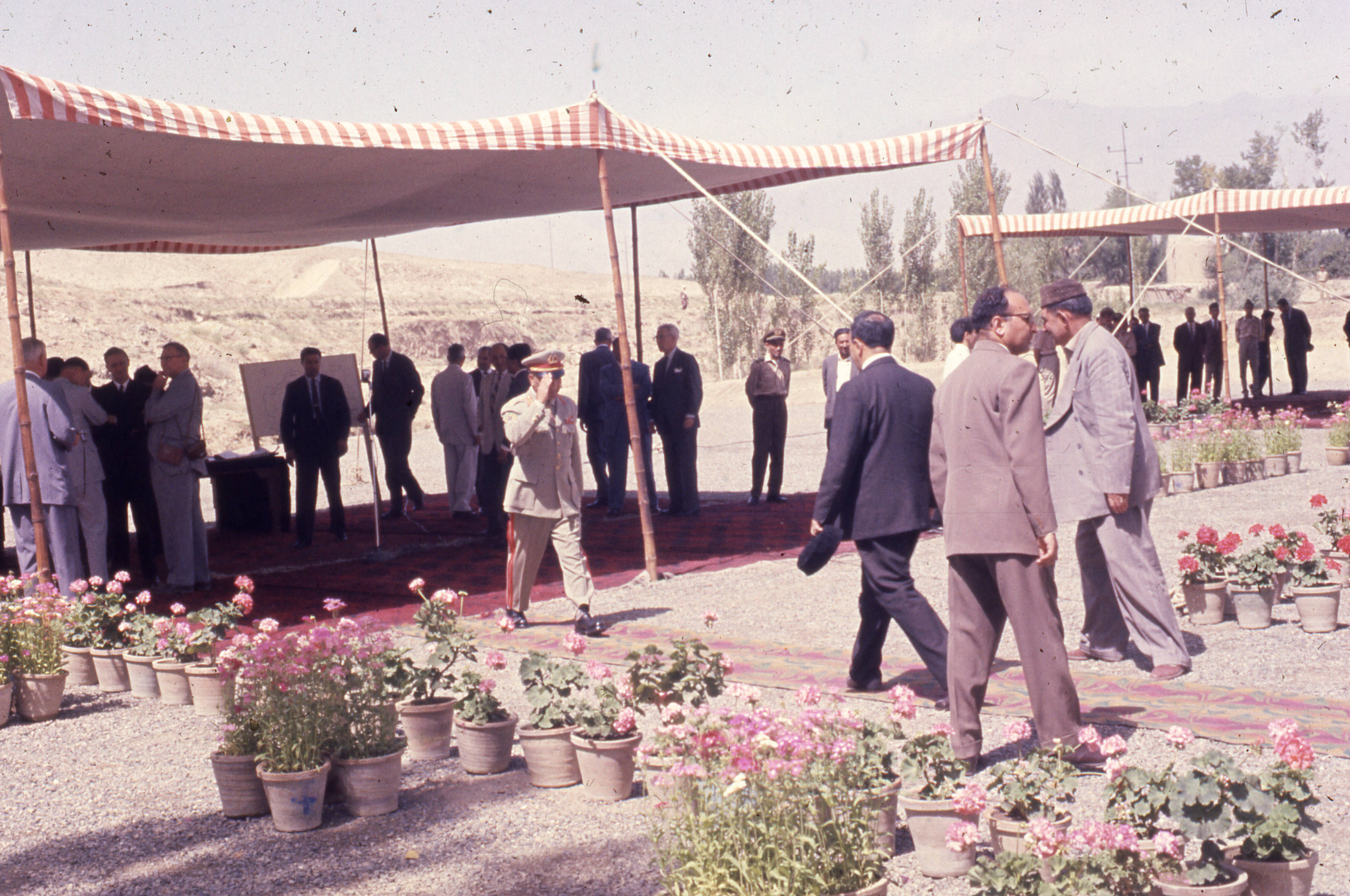
Opening ceremony

== Route ==
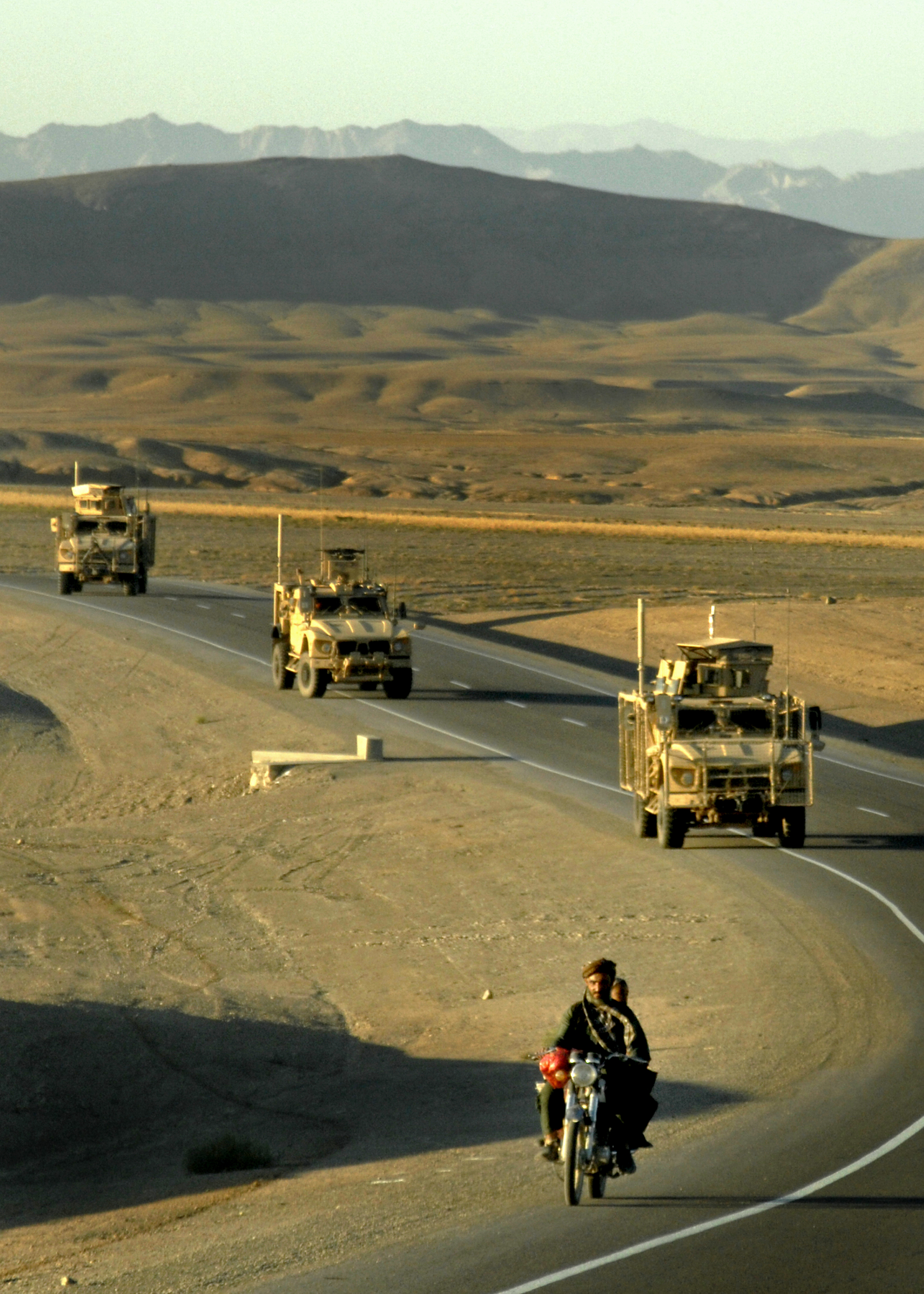
Kabul-Kandahar Highway at Zabul Province in 2011

The Kabul–Kandahar Highway officially starts around the Company Bridge in the western part of Kabul. It traverses the provinces of Kabul, Maidan Wardak, Ghazni, Zabul, and Kandahar. The first major intersection is at Maidan Shar in Wardak Province, which is the starting point of the Kabul-Behsud Highway. The second major intersection is before reaching Saydabad where Tangi Road starts. That road connects it to Puli Alam, the capital of Logar Province. The third and fourth are at Ghazni where one highway goes to Gardez, the capital of Paktia Province, and the other to Angoor Adda in the Barmal District of Paktika Province. The fifth is at Qalat in Zabul Province, and the last one at Durani Square in Kandahar where the Kandahar-Boldak Highway starts. In between these major intersections are many smaller roads connecting different districts, towns and villages.

== Major accidents and security issues ==
On December 18, 2024, a total of 50 people were killed, and 76 others were injured in two separate crashes along the highway in Ghazni Province, including a collision between a passenger bus and an oil tanker.

On May 8, 2016, a major vehicular crash killed at least 73 and injured over 50 people along the Kabul-Kandahar Highway in Moqor District of Ghazni Province. Two buses traveling from Kabul to Kandahar collided with a fuel tanker, causing a fiery inferno. The vehicles were reportedly speeding to avoid ambush by the Taliban. At least 38 persons died in September 2016 when a fuel tanker collided with a passenger bus in the Jildak area of Zabul Province. A provincial government spokesperson blamed the accident on the recklessness of drivers of both vehicles.

As of early 2004, Taliban fighters continued to harass travelers of the corridor. Afghan guards, soldiers, mercenaries, and workers have been killed along the route. In October 2003, they kidnapped a Turkish contractor, and that December they kidnapped two Indian workers. In February 2004, Taliban rebels fired upon a Louis Berger Group helicopter, killing one and injuring two.

In March 2004, rebels murdered a Turkish engineer and an Afghan guard. Another Turkish engineer and an interpreter were kidnapped. This action prompted the United States to set up small civilian-military teams in three locations along the route. These teams no longer exist.

== See also ==
- Kandahar–Herat Highway
