= Abdul Hamid Bahij =

Afghan physician and writer (born 1979)

Dr. Abdul Hamid Bahij ډاکټر عبدالحميد بهيج
- Born: Abdul Hamid; March 6, 1979 (age 47); Bedmushk, Jaghto district of Wardak province, Afghanistan
- Education: Kabul Medical University, institute for languages of Quetta
- Occupations: Medical doctor, writer, translator and dictionary writer
- Relatives: Ghulam Habib (father) and Khoshdil (grandfather)
- Writing career
- Language: Pashto, English, Persian
- Subjects: Medical dictionary, language dictionaries, political dictionary, philosophical dictionary, Islamic learnings, mathematics and science.
- Notable work: Bahij's English – Pashto dictionary
- Literary movement: Danish Publishing Association

Abdul Hamid Bahij (Pashto: ډاکټر عبدالحميد بهيج), is an Afghan medical doctor, writer, translator and dictionary writer.

== Early life ==
Abdul Hamid Bahij Osmani was born on March 6, 1979, in the village of Bedmushk, Jaghatu district of Wardak province, Afghanistan. As the son of Ghulam Habib and grandson of Khoshdil.

== Education ==
Hamid gained his primary and secondary educations in the beautiful city of Peshawar. He went for his high education to Kabul Medical University. He gained his doctor from Kabul Medical University in the year 2006. Hamid is now concurrently busy with his study of German language at the Institute of Goethe.

== Works ==
His dictionary, with around 17,0000 Pashto words into English, is published by the Danish Publishings Association in 2008 and reprinted in 2009.

=== Published works ===
Bahij has published 22 books of which 5 of them are dictionaries. The following list contains some of his published books;

1. Bahij's Political Dictionary, is a Political English-Pashto dictionary of 410/411 pages and is published in year 2005.
2. English-Pashto Philosophical Dictionary, is an English-Pashto philosophical dictionary of 323 pages and is published in the year 2005.
3. Bahij's Medical Dictionary, is a medical English-Pashto dictionary of 1206 pages and is published in the year 2006.
4. Medical Terminology, 360 pages.
5. Da baran pa zhaba (on rains language), based on speeches of Jabrankhel Jabran.
6. Mathematics and Physical Science, for twelfth class.
7. Triangle, for eleventh class
8. Mathematics, for eleventh class.
9. Dr. Abdul Hamid Bahij and the Academy of Sciences of Afghanistan 2008. Pashto-English Dictionary. Kabul: Danish Publishing Association. With over 150 thousands (150000) words.
10. Bahij English-Pashto Dictionary, 380 pages and published in year 2008.

(Note: All above mentioned books are published by Danish Publishing Association.)
