= Jaghatu District, Maidan Wardak =

Place in Wardak Province, Afghanistan

Jaghatu جغتو
- District
- Location in Afghanistan
- Coordinates: 33.8554°N 68.3951°E
- Country: Afghanistan
- Province: Maidan Wardak
- Time zone: + 4.30

Jaghatu (Pashto: جاغتو) is a district in Maidan Wardak province, Afghanistan, 20 km northwest of Ghazni.

== Demographics ==
According to 2019 data, the population is 50,792. The district is mostly populated by the Wardak tribe of Pashtuns.

== Notable people ==
- Mohammad Jan Khan (1835–1880), Afghan military commander
- Abdul Hamid Bahij (born 1979), medical doctor, writer, translator and dictionary writer
- Rahmatullah Nabil (born 1968), politician

== See also ==
- Jalrez District
