= Mazari Sharif prison =

Prison in Afghanistan

The Taliban maintained a prison in Mazari Sharif. Several Guantanamo captives testified that they had been held in a prison in Mazari Sharif. Some of them testified that they had been tortured by the Taliban at the prison in Mazari Sharif.

== Individuals who claimed the Taliban held them at its prison in Mazari Sharif ==
Individuals who claimed the Taliban held them at its prison in Mazari Sharif
isn	name	notes
675	Kamalludin Kasimbekov	Held for five months in the prison in Mazari Sharif, for trying to run away from involuntary service with the Islamic Movement of Uzbekistan.; Was released from custody on September 16, 2001, in return for agreeing to serve on the front lines in Kunduz.
1002	Abdul Matin	Captured in 1995, and held for ransom.; He reports being tortured in the prison.; He faced the allegation that he had been the warden of the prison, even though he claimed he had seven years of sign-ins that proved he had been a high school science teacher in Pakistan throughout the Taliban's administration.; He reported in 2004 that his Taliban torturer was also in Guantanamo, and was accorded more privileges than he was.; He reported in 2005 that his Taliban torturer was released years before he was.

== See also ==
- List of prisons in Afghanistan
