= Sher Ahmad Ammar =

Afghan Taliban politician

Maulvi Sher Ahmad Ammar Mujahid
- Pashto: مولوی شیر احمد عمار مجاهده

Deputy governor of Maidan Wardak Province
- Incumbent
- Assumed office 8 November 2021
- Prime Minister: Hasan Akhund
- Emir: Hibatullah Akhundzada

Deputy governor of Herat Province
- In office 25 September 2021 – 26 October 2021
- Prime Minister: Hasan Akhund
- Emir: Hibatullah Akhundzada
- Succeeded by: Abdul Qayyum Rohani

Maulvi Sher Ahmad Ammar (مولوی شیر احمد عمار مجاهد) is an Afghan Taliban politician, Islamic scholar and Sheikh-ul-Hadith. He is currently serving as Deputy governor of Maidan Wardak Province since 8 November 2021. He has also served as deputy governor of Herat Province in Afghanistan from 25 September 2021 to 26 October 2021.
