= Shibar =

Shibar شیبر
- City
- Location within Afghanistan
- Coordinates: 34°51′55″N 68°08′42″E
- Country: Afghanistan
- District: Shibar
- Time zone: + 4.30

Shibar (Dari: شیبر) is the capital city of Shibar District located in Bamyan Province, Afghanistan.

== See also ==
- List of cities in Afghanistan
