= Saydabad =

City in Wardak Province, Afghanistan

- Location in Afghanistan
- Coordinates: 34.0004°N 68.7135°E
- Country: Afghanistan
- Province: Maidan Wardak Province
- District: Saydabad District
- Elevation: 2,155 m (7,070 ft)

Population
  - Total: 7,301
- Time zone: UTC+4:30 (Afghanistan Standard Time)

Saydābād (Pashto: سيد اباد) is a city in Maidan Wardak Province, central Afghanistan. It is the administrative center of Saydabad District with the main government offices for the district located there. It is located along the main Kabul-Kandahar Highway.

The city of Saydabad has a population of 7,301. It is located within the heartland of the Wardak tribe of Pashtuns.

== Geography ==
Saydabad is located about 2,155 m above sea level.

=== Climate ===
Saydabad has a warm-summer humid continental climate (Köppen climate classification: Dsb)

Climate data for Markaz-e Sayyidābād
| Month | Jan | Feb | Mar | Apr | May | Jun | Jul | Aug | Sep | Oct | Nov | Dec | Year |
|---|---|---|---|---|---|---|---|---|---|---|---|---|---|
| Daily mean °C (°F) | −4.1 (24.6) | −2.4 (27.7) | 3.0 (37.4) | 8.1 (46.6) | 12.5 (54.5) | 17.2 (63.0) | 19.2 (66.6) | 18.5 (65.3) | 15.0 (59.0) | 9.7 (49.5) | 3.3 (37.9) | −1.7 (28.9) | 8.2 (46.8) |
| Average precipitation mm (inches) | 54.8 (2.16) | 83.4 (3.28) | 84.1 (3.31) | 78.9 (3.11) | 46.3 (1.82) | 17.9 (0.70) | 28.8 (1.13) | 25.5 (1.00) | 14.1 (0.56) | 18.0 (0.71) | 23.7 (0.93) | 28.6 (1.13) | 504.1 (19.84) |
Source: ClimateCharts.net

== Demographics ==
A majority of the population is Pashtun. Pashto of the Wardagi accent is spoken in the town.
