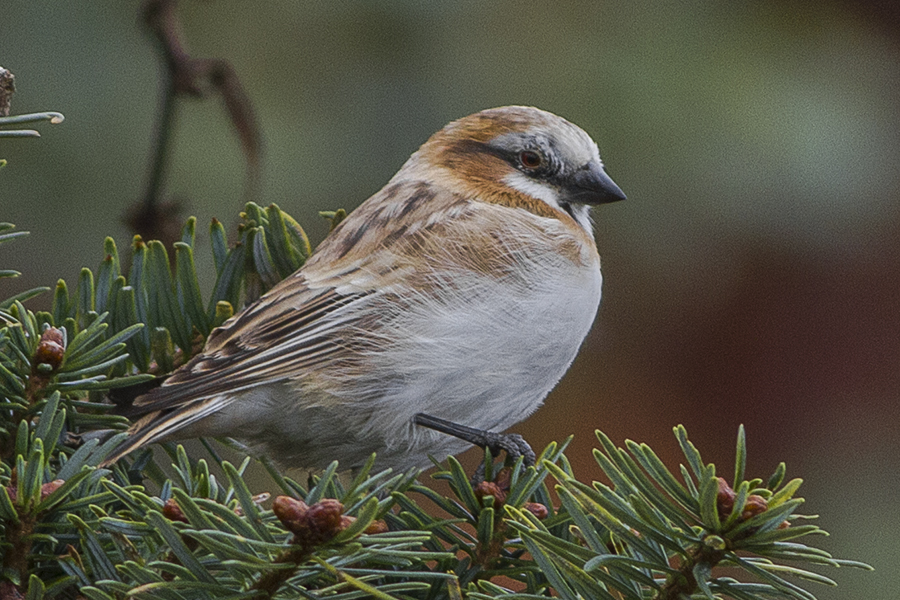
- Rufous-necked snowfinch (Pyrgilauda ruficollis)

Scientific classification
- Kingdom: Animalia
- Phylum: Chordata
- Class: Aves
- Order: Passeriformes
- Family: Passeridae
- Genus: Pyrgilauda; Bonaparte, 1850

Type species
- Pyrgilauda davidiana (Père David's snowfinch) Verreaux, 1871

Species
- See text

= Pyrgilauda =

Genus of birds

Pyrgilauda is a genus of passerine birds in the sparrow family Passeridae. They are found in the Himalayas, Tibet and western China.

The genus name was introduced by the French naturalist Charles Lucien Bonaparte in 1850. The type species was designated by Jules Verreaux in 1871 as Père David's snowfinch. The name is a portmanteau of the genera Pyrgita Cuvier 1817, "sparrow", and Alauda Linnaeus, 1758, "lark".

The genus contains four species:

Image	Scientific name	Common name	Distribution
	Pyrgilauda theresae	Afghan snowfinch	Afghanistan
	Pyrgilauda ruficollis	Rufous-necked snowfinch	Uttarakhand, Nepal, Sikkim and Bhutan.
	Pyrgilauda davidiana	Père David's snowfinch	Mongolia, southern Siberia and northern China
	Pyrgilauda blanfordi	Blanford's snowfinch	China, India, Nepal, and Pakistan

These species are sometimes included in the genus Montifringilla.
