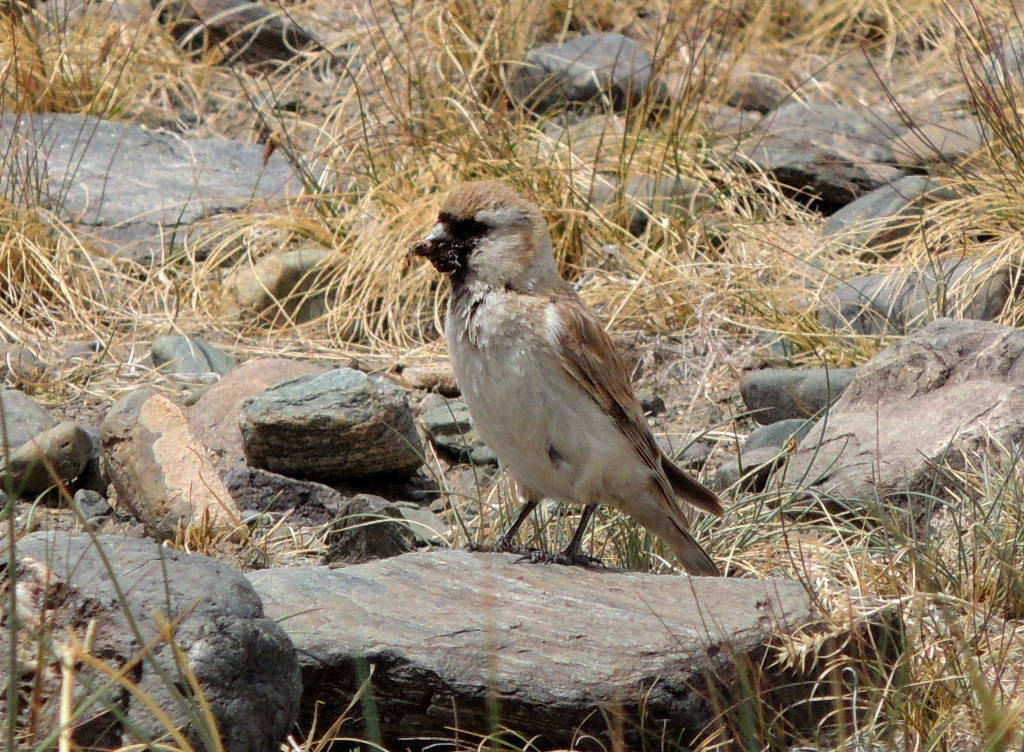

Conservation status
- Least Concern (IUCN 3.1)

Scientific classification
- Kingdom: Animalia
- Phylum: Chordata
- Class: Aves
- Order: Passeriformes
- Family: Passeridae
- Genus: Pyrgilauda
- Species: P. davidiana

Binomial name
- Pyrgilauda davidiana Verreaux, 1871

Synonyms
- Montifringilla davidiana

= Père David's snowfinch =

Species of bird

Père David's snowfinch (Pyrgilauda davidiana), also known as the small snowfinch, is a species of bird in the sparrow family.

It is found in Mongolia, southern Siberia and northern China. Its natural habitat is temperate grassland.
