= Sarchashma =

Sarchashma سرچشمه
- Subdistrict
- Location in Afghanistan
- Coordinates: 34°43′N 68°52′E
- Country: Afghanistan
- Province: Maidan Wardak
- District: Jalrez
- Elevation: 2,629 m (8,625 ft)
- Time zone: UTC+04:30

Sarchasmah (Persian: سرچشمه) is a subdistrict of Jalrez District, Maidan Wardak Province, Afghanistan. It has a population of around 5,000, who are mostly Hazaras.
