= Subdistricts of Afghanistan =

The Subdistricts of Afghanistan are the third-level administrative units of Afghanistan, subdivisions of the districts. They are known as "Alaqadari" and are the smallest administrative divisions. Each alaqadari is headed by an "alaqadar", appointed by the government in Kabul or a provincial governor.

== List ==
=== Wardak Province ===
==== Jalrez District ====
The divisions are also referred to as hawzaha-ye edari:

- Jalrez
- Zaiwalat
- Sanglakh
- Takana
- Sarchashma
