= Saydabad District =

District in Wardak Province, Afghanistan

Saydabad سیدآباد
- District
- Location in Afghanistan
- Coordinates: 33°53′15″N 68°41′40″E
- Country: Afghanistan
- Province: Maidan Wardak Province

Population
  - Total: 114,793
- Time zone: + 4.30

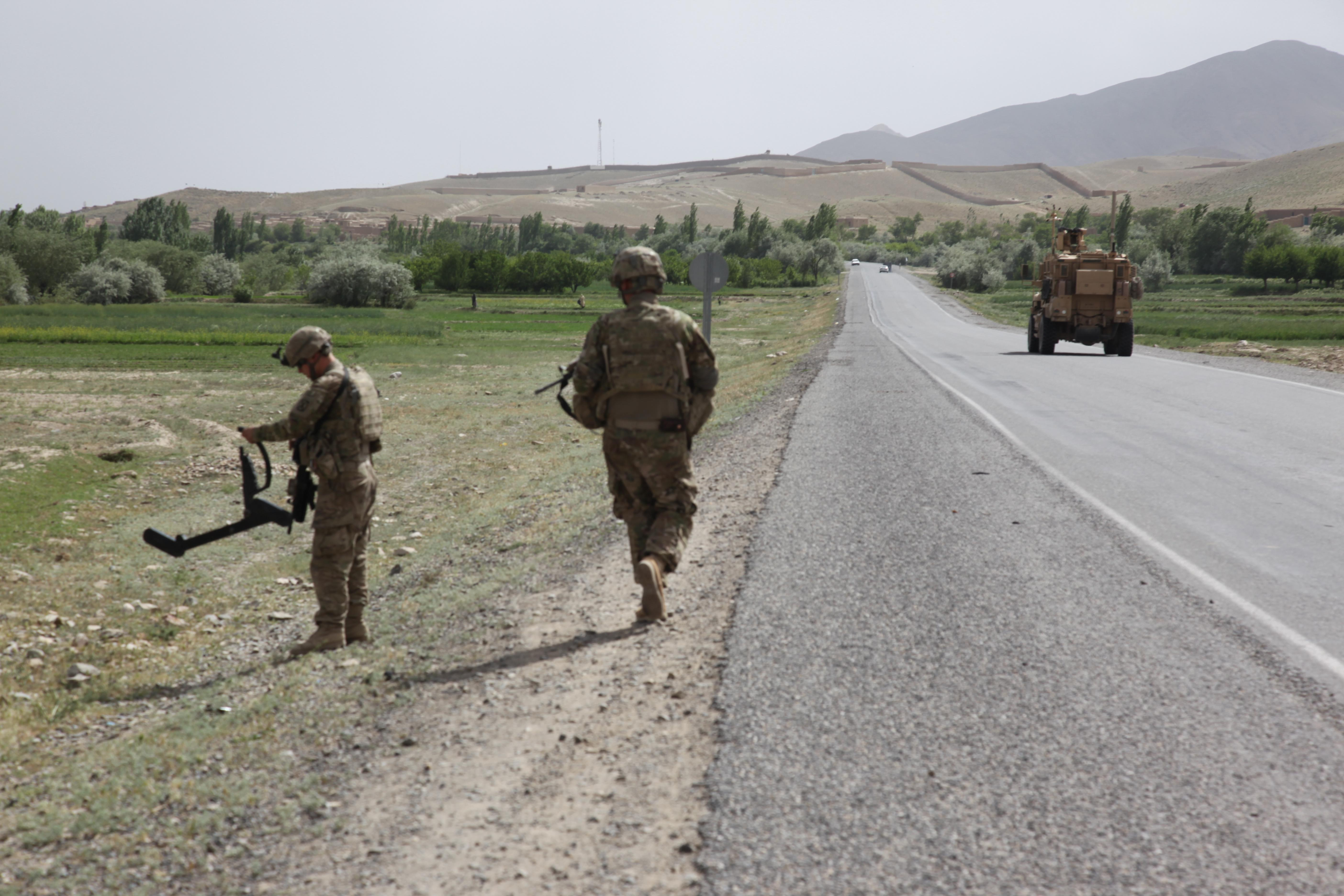
American soldiers checking for militant-planted IEDs by a road in Sayedabad district of Wardak Province, Afghanistan.

Saydabad District (Pashto: سیدآباد ولسوالۍ) is a district of Maidan Wardak Province, Afghanistan. The district is known for its pleasant climate, including hilly vegetation, streams, and orchards. The district was a popular retreat for Kabul residents until an increase in ISAF-Taliban violence in the late 2000s. The city of Saydabad serves as the district capital. With a population of 114,793, it is the most populous district of the province.

The district is within the heartland of the Wardak tribe of Pashtuns.

== Security and politics ==
On 17 November 2009, Afghan National Security Forces (ANSF) assisted by NATO International Security Assistance Force (ISAF), raided a compound killing five people. Wardak provincial officials stated that at least four of the people killed were militants. Officials did not say whether the fifth casualty, a woman, was also a militant. Two militants were also arrested.

As of 2009, Sayadabad is one of the districts participating in the Afghan Public Protection Force program. Sayed Abad district is one of the unsecure districts of Wardak province. It has good climate, good weather, good agriculture, and good water and sanitation system.

== Villages in Saydabad District ==
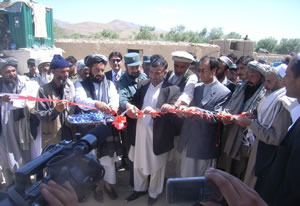
Opening ceremony of the karez irrigation system repair project in Sayed-Abad district

- Barat Khail
- Patan khail
- San khail
- Gurbat Baghak
- Tangee
- Sheikh Abad
- Seerak Sarqool
- Bahadur Khail
- Unkhai
- Changai
- Dandokai
- Chardehi
- Sultan Khail
- Shash Gaaw
- Haft Asia
- Autari
- Karro Khail
- Yousuf Khail Azro lalak
- Maghul Khail PatanKhail
- Salar, Rahman Khail
- Hasankhel
- Aka Khel
- Maidan
- Kola Khaish
- Aryab Kalan
- Shater/ Jalawan
- Kuz Jungjai
- Sia Choob
- Lora
- Shirkhil
- Mamokhil
- Mangali
- Shashqala
- Aziz kala
- Mullah Ghazi
- Buzak
- Googar
- Abdulmuhaideen
- Beedaka
- Nawda
- Mast Khil
- Lwar kalay
- Geedar Khil
- Sra Kala
- Payinda Khil
- Haidar Khil
- Laram
- Kach Qalaa
- Sadokhil

Sultankhil

- Mahru

== See also ==
- Districts of Afghanistan
