= Nirkh District =

District in Maidan Wardak Province, Afghanistan

Nirkh نرخ
- District
- Location within Afghanistan
- Country: Afghanistan
- Province: Wardak Province

Nirkh (Pashto: نرخ) or Nerkh is a district of about 480 square kilometres (185 sq. mi.) in the east of Wardak Province, Afghanistan. Its population was estimated at 57,000 in 2002, consisting of about 100% Pashtuns,. The district centre is Kane Ezzat.

During the presidency of Mohammed Daoud Khan in the 1970s, Nirkh District was planted with many fruit trees; however, these have since dried up in droughts.

== Security and Politics ==
It was reported on 17 November 2009 that Afghan and NATO forces killed one farmer and a militant during an operation.

It was reported on 20 November that a suspected militant was detained in Darmandyan when several compounds used by the Taliban for IED and small arms attacks were searched.

On 12 May 2021 it was captured by Taliban.
