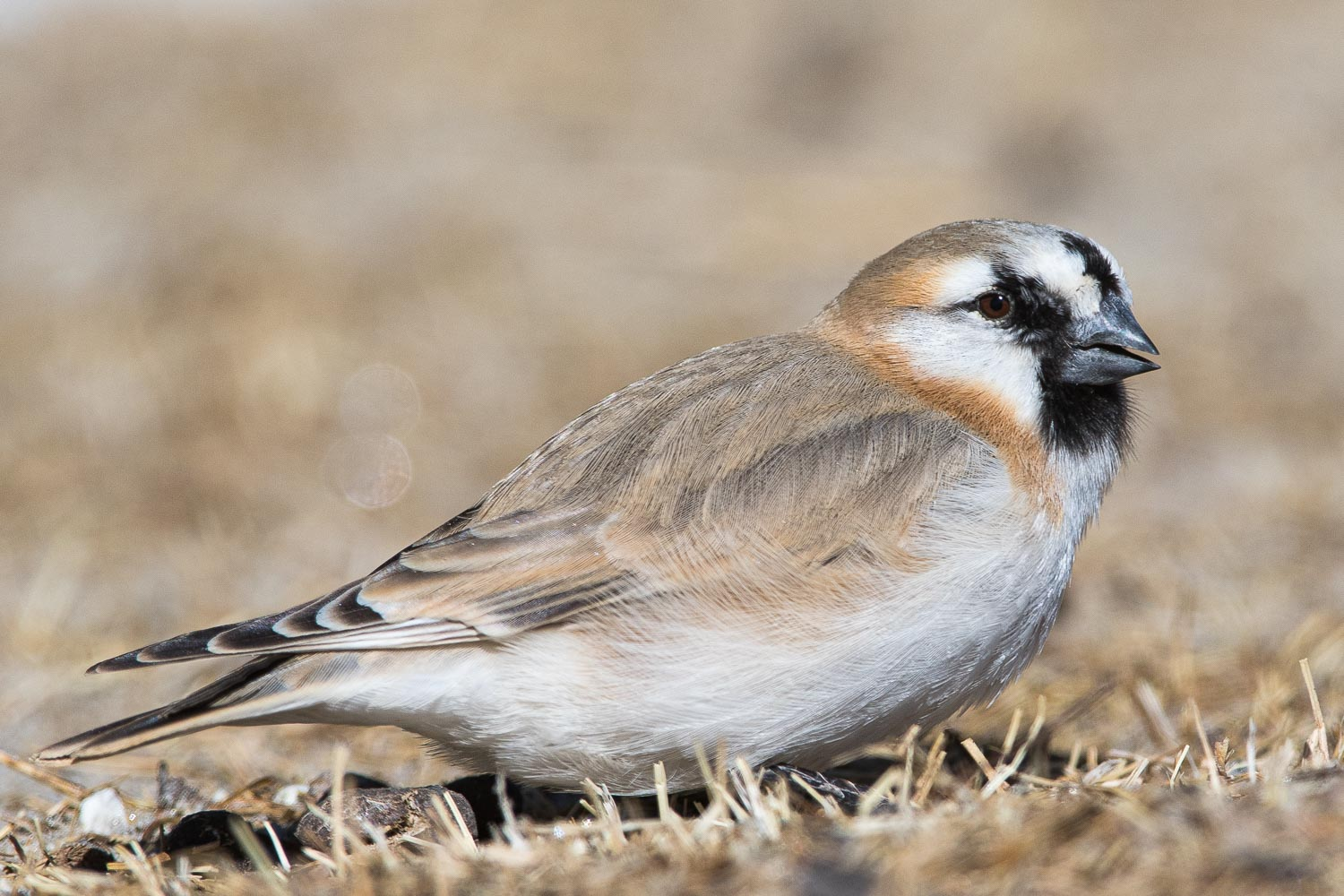
- Blanford's Snowfinch at Puga Valley, Ladakh, India

Conservation status
- Least Concern (IUCN 3.1)

Scientific classification
- Kingdom: Animalia
- Phylum: Chordata
- Class: Aves
- Order: Passeriformes
- Family: Passeridae
- Genus: Pyrgilauda
- Species: P. blanfordi

Binomial name
- Pyrgilauda blanfordi (Hume, 1876)

Synonyms
- Montifringilla blanfordi

= Blanford's snowfinch =

Species of bird

Blanford's snowfinch (Pyrgilauda blanfordi) or the plain-backed snowfinch, is a species of bird in the sparrow family.

It is found in China, India, Nepal, and Pakistan. Its natural habitat is temperate grassland.

The species epithet and common name commemorate the English zoologist William Thomas Blanford.
