= Hesa Awal Behsud District =

Settlement in Wardak Province, Afghanistan

Hesa Awal Behsud District حصه اول بهسود
- District
- Location in Afghanistan
- Coordinates: 34°28′19″N 68°39′02″E
- Country: Afghanistan
- Province: Maidan Wardak
- Villages number: 289
- Capital: Dahani Siasang

Government
  - Type: District
  - Governor: Mohsen Wahdat

Area
  - Total: 1,325 km^{2} (512 sq mi)
- Elevation: 3,200 m (10,500 ft)

Population (2020)
  - Total: 55,709
  - Density: 42.04/km^{2} (108.9/sq mi)
- Time zone: UTC+4:30 (Afghanistan Standard Time)
- Postal code: 1352
- Website: Official page

Hisa-e-Awali Behsud (Dari: حصه اول بهسود) is a district of Maidan Wardak Province, Afghanistan. The district has a Hazara majority resident population, but the district is also used as grazing ground by nomadic Pashtun Kuchis. The Hajigak Mine is located in the district.

Since 2007 there has been a flare-up in ethnic violence in the district, emanating from a dispute between Hazaras and Kuchis over the ownership of vast tracts of land, with the Hazara claiming Kuchi militias are being armed by the Taliban. Several villages have been burned and thousands have had to flee the area.

== See also ==
- Markazi Bihsud District
- Behsud, Maidan Wardak
- Kuchi–Hazara conflict

== Sources ==
- Makia Monir (July 16, 2007). "UNAMA concerned over tension in Behsud". Afghanistan News Center. KABUL. Pajhwok Afghan News. Archived from the original on April 10, 2008.
- Tom Coghlan (12 April 2008). "Villagers forced out by 'Taliban' nomads". Telegraph.co.uk. Behsood District Wardak Province.
