= Markazi Behsud District =

Settlement in Maidan Wardak Province, Afghanistan

Markazi Behsud District ولسوالی مرکز بهسود
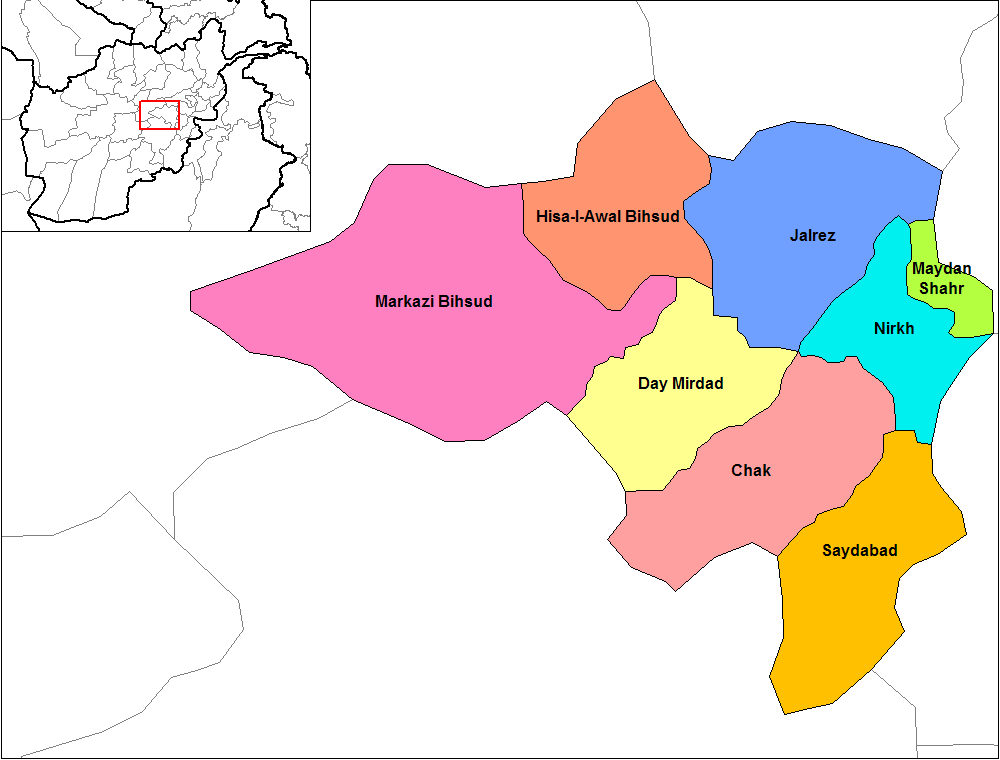
- Markazi Behsud District in dark pink in the west

- Location in Afghanistan
- Coordinates: 34.3157°N 68.0478°E
- Country: Afghanistan
- Province: Maidan Wardak
- Capital: Behsud
- Village numbers: 781

Government
  - Type: District
  - Governor: Jan Aqa Mohasel

Area
  - Total: 2,186 km^{2} (844 sq mi)
- Elevation: 2,950 m (9,680 ft)

Population (2020)
  - Total: 134,852
- Time zone: UTC+4:30 (Afghanistan Standard Time)
- Postal code: 1351
- Main languages: Persian

Markazi Behsud District (Dari: ولسوالی مرکز بهسود) is one of the districts of Maidan Wardak Province in Afghanistan. It is located less than an hour-drive west of Kabul and south Bamyan. The main town in the district is Behsud. The district has an estimated population of 134,852 people, majority of which are ethnic Hazaras.

The Markazi Behsud is the largest district of Maidan Wardak Province with a number of villages. Most residents of the district are farmers and involved in agriculture. The chief of the district is Abdul Rahman Tawfiq.

The Hesa Awal Behsud District sits to the northeast of this district. Both are strongholds of Hazara militia forces who have engaged in guerrilla warfare with the Taliban and the Afghan National Security Forces (ANSF). One of these groups is led by Abdul Ghani Alipur (also known as Commander Shamshir), who was a fugitive of the former Afghan government; his followers used a rocket-propelled grenade to shoot down an Mil Mi-17 of the Afghan Air Force on March 18, 2021, which was transporting several members of the Afghan National Police. All nine ANSF members in the Mi-17 helicopter were killed, including the Afghan pilots.

Alipar's militia has continued battling the Taliban after it seized power in August 2021. As of September 2021, sporadic clashes were taking place between the militia and the Taliban.

== See also ==
- Districts of Afghanistan
