= Unai Pass =

Mountain pass in Afghanistan

Unai Pass گذرگاه اونی
- Interactive map of Unai Pass گذرگاه اونی
- Elevation: 3,252 metres (10,669 ft)

Third Approach
- Location: Maidan Wardak, Afghanistan
- Coordinates: 34.467°N 68.329°E

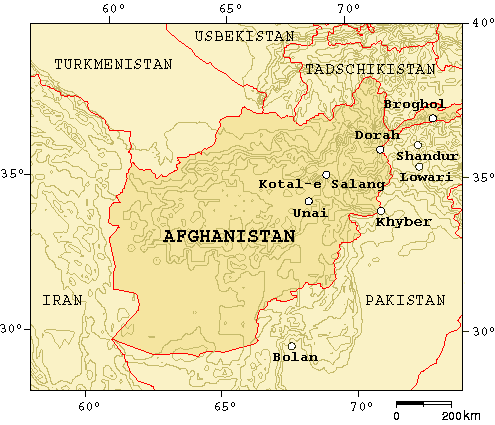
Mountain passes of Afghanistan

The Unai Pass or Onai Pass (Persian: گذرگاه اونی) is a mountain pass on the western side of the Paghman Mountains in Jalrez District, Maidan Wardak Province, Afghanistan. It is of strategical importance due to its geographical location to the southwest of Kabul. The Sarchashma River flows through the pass, which is the upstream part of the Kabul River. The Maidan River, a tributary of the Kabul/Sarchashma rises at the pass at an altitude of about 3,300 metres (10,800 ft).

Due to its importance, the pass has had a long history of being the focus of conflict in Afghanistan. In 1929, Muhammad Mir Fath (1901-1964) was one of three Hazara commanders who defeated the forces of Habibullah Kalakani at the pass between March and September of that year. The mujahedin took the Unai Pass in the spring of 1979 during the war against the Soviet-backed Afghan communist regime, and Jalrez district was one of the earliest districts to be taken. In 1983, the Hazara Al-Nasr group attacked the Harakat Islami in Siasang and the area near the pass.

In 2008, the Ministry of Public Works began the rehabilitation of 136 kilometres of the Kabul highway, with a 36 million euros funding from the Italian government. The first phase of the project, Lot No 1, began in 2008 with the rehabilitation of a 54-kilometre stretch of earth road starting in Maidan Shar and working towards the Unai Pass.
