= Maidan Wardak Province =

Province of Afghanistan

Wardak وردک
- Province
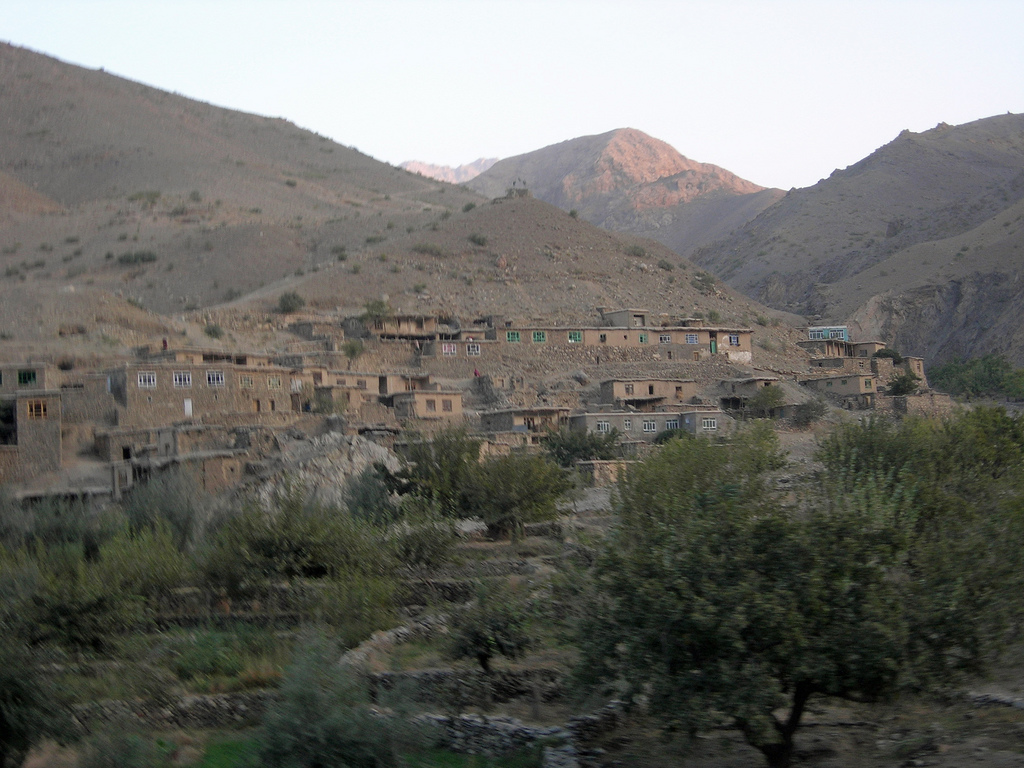
- A settlement in Wardak along the road between Kabul and Bamiyan

- Map of Afghanistan with Wardak highlighted
- Coordinates (Capital): 34.4°N 68.4°E
- Country: Afghanistan
- Capital: Maidan Shar

Government
  - Governor: Qari Bakhtiar
  - Deputy Governor: Sher Ahmad Ammar
  - Police Chief: Sheikh Mohammad Sharif Halimi

Area
  - Total: 10,348 km^{2} (3,995 sq mi)
  - Land: 10,348 km^{2} (3,995 sq mi)
  - Water: 0 km^{2} (0 sq mi)

Population (2021)
  - Total: 671,817
  - Density: 64.922/km^{2} (168.15/sq mi)
- Time zone: UTC+4:30 (Afghanistan Time)
- Postal code: 13xx
- ISO 3166 code: AF-WAR
- Main languages: Pashto: Dari; Hazaragi

Maidan Wardak, (Pashto (Note: Pashto pronunciation: [maɪ.dɑn waɾ.d̪ak]); Dari (Note: Dari pronunciation: [mäj.d̪ɑ́ː.nɪ wäɾ.d̪ǽk]): میدان وردک) simply Wardak or Wardag (Pashto; Dari: وردگ), is one of the 34 provinces of Afghanistan, located in the central region of Afghanistan. It is divided into eight districts and has a population of approximately 500,000. The capital of the province is Maidan Shar, while the most populous district in the province is Saydabad District. Wardak is known for one of its famous high peak mountain known as (Shah Foladi). In 2021, the Taliban gained control of the province during the 2021 Taliban offensive. Wardak is one of the 34 provinces of Afghanistan, located in central Afghanistan. Its capital is the closest provincial city to Kabul.

== History ==
During the communist times, the people of Wardak never gave significant support to the communist government, but the people of its capital, Maidan Shahr did sympathize with them.

Wardak has also threatened uprisings against the Taliban in Saydabad, numerous schooling system approved by UNICEF set up in Saydabad District, and the mayor of Maidan Shar (the capital of the province), was a elected mayor in 2019 as a woman, Zarifa Ghafari and was awarded the Woman of Courage Award of 2020. This is why Wardak is considered as one of the most liberal provinces in Afghanistan, and because of its adjacent border with the biggest urban center in Afghanistan, Kabul Province. This also makes it one of the most liberal Pashtun provinces.

Wardak Province was significant during the Civil War in Afghanistan, due to its proximity to Kabul and its agricultural lands. Hezb-e Wahdat had a significant presence in the area. Most of the area was captured by the Taliban around winter 1995. It remains a major Taliban travel route to Kabul with Maidan Shar a target for terror.

The security situation rapidly deteriorated in Wardak in 2008 and 2009. According to a report by Mohammad Osman Tariq Elias, both Logar and Wardak, by the end of 2008, were under de facto Taliban control. As of April 2009, the Ministry of the Interior (Afghanistan) had listed the entire province as "High Risk."

In October 2017, US Forces from elements of the 1st Battalion 87th Infantry Regiment and 10th Special Operations Group launched an offensive to wrest the province from Taliban control.

On 21 January 2019, a Taliban attack on a military base and police training center in the province resulted in 125 NDS officers killed. At least 30 people were reported to be injured. The attack came during a time of intense daily violence throughout the country.

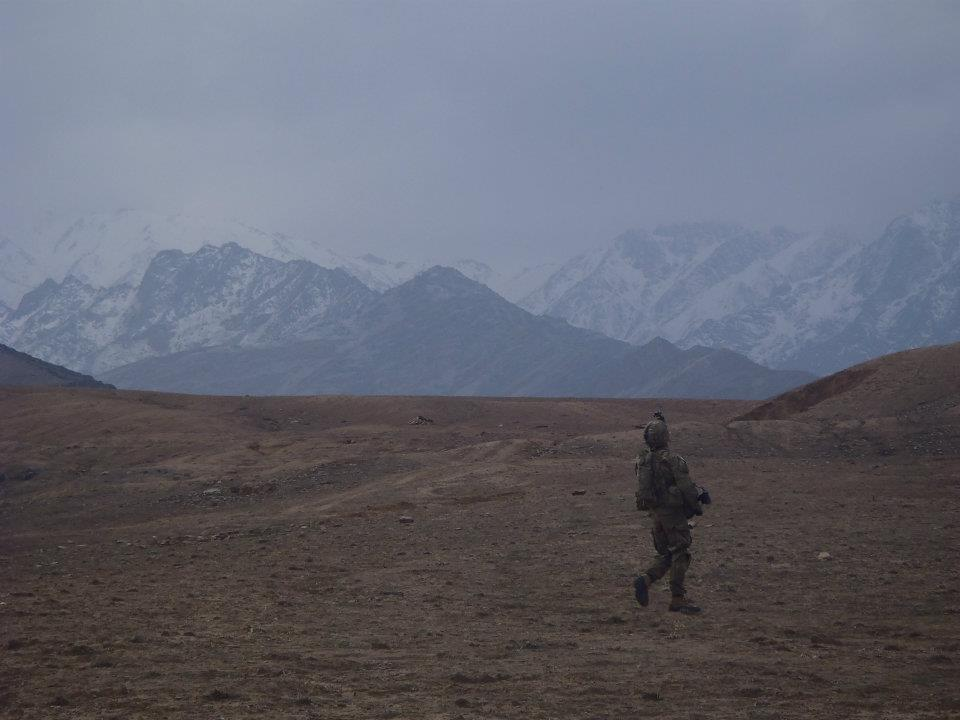
US Soldier in Wardak Province in 2011

== Geography ==
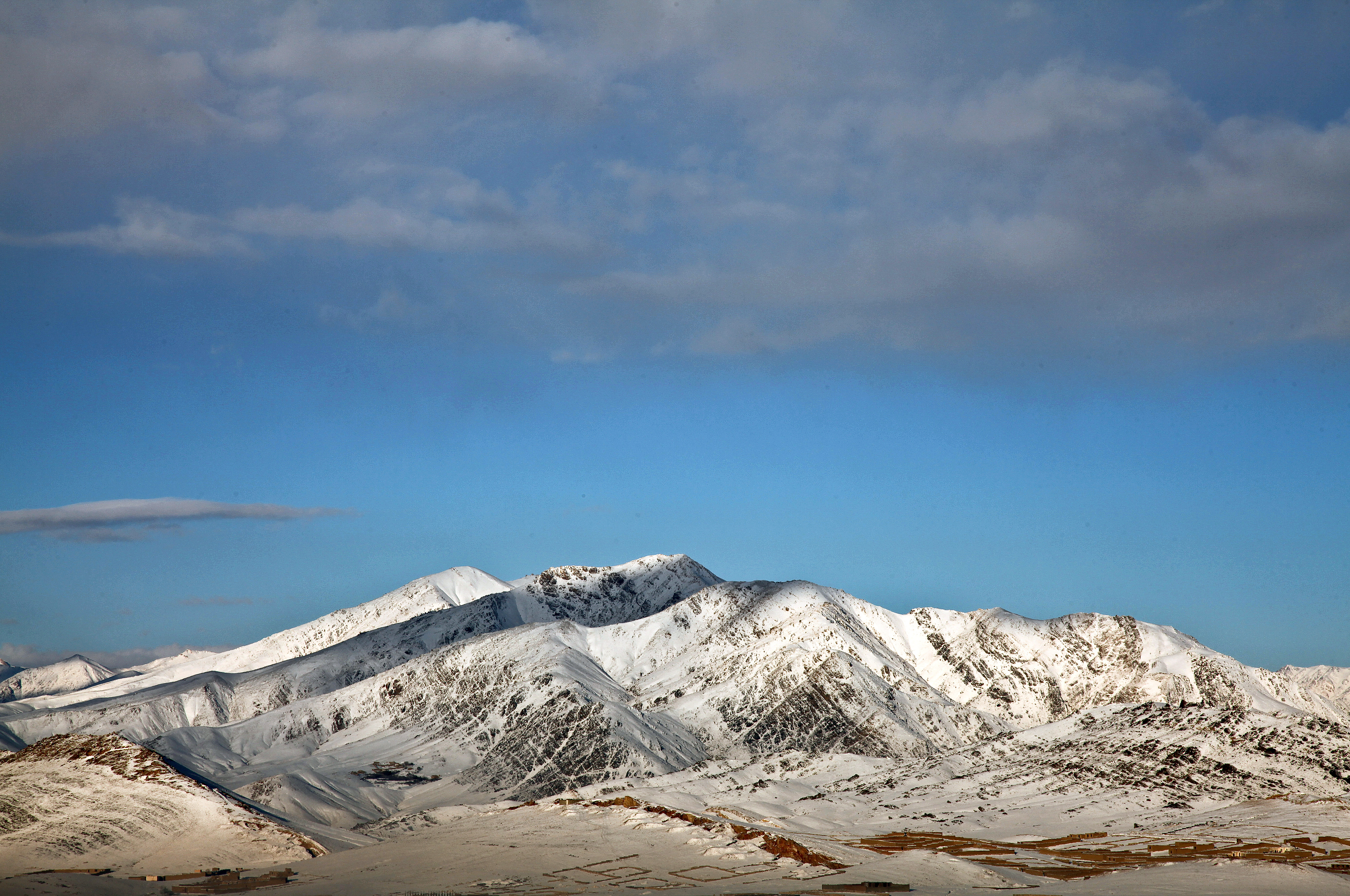
The mountains around Wardak province, Afghanistan, are covered with snow after a two-day snow storm, 25 November 2009

Wardak province is located in the central and eastern region of Afghanistan; bordering Parwan to the northeast, Kabul and Logar to the east, Ghazni to the south and Bamyan to the west. The capital of Wardak province is Maidan Shar, which is located about 35 km from Kabul. Wardak province covers an area of 9,934 km^{2}. It is mountainous like the rest of the country with plains and many valleys, such as the Tangi Valley. The majority of its residents live in rural areas. The most heavily populated areas are along the Kabul–Kandahar Highway. The rest of the province is thinly populated, with villages concentrated in areas with available irrigation and water sources (CSO and UNFPA, 2003). Famous passes include the Unai Pass and the Hajigak Pass.

== Administrative divisions ==
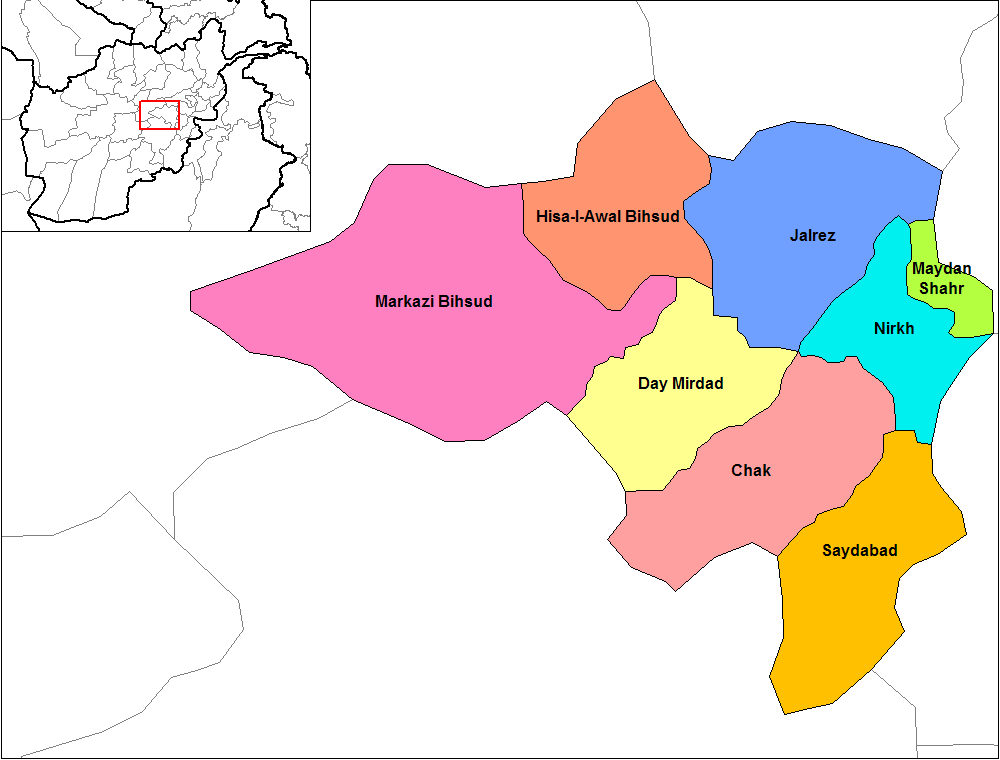
Map of the districts of Wardak as of January 2004, prior to the redrawing of provincial and district boundaries later that year

Districts of Wardak Province
District	Capital	Population	Area	Pop. density	Notes (Note: "Predominantely" or "dominated" is interpreted as 99%, "majority" as 70%, "mixed" as 1/(number of ethnicities), "minority" as 30% and "few" or "some" as 1%.)
Chak Wardak	Chak Wardak	95,392	1,153	83	Predominantely Pashtuns.
Day Mirdad	Miran	35,075	976	36	63% Pashtuns, 37% Hazaras.
Hisa-I-Awali Bihsud		41,850	1,406	30	Majority Hazaras, minority Pashtun Kuchis.
Jaghatu		51,682	595	87	100% Pashtuns. Shifted from Ghazni Province in 2005.
Jalrez		59,920	1,182	51	Majority Hazaras, minority Pashtuns, few Tajiks.
Markazi Bihsud	Behsud	134,852	3,616	37	Predominantly Hazaras.
Maidan Shar	Maidan Shar	45,787	211	217	85% Pashtuns, 14% Tajiks, 1% Hazaras.
Nirkh		64,436	530	122	80% Pashtuns, 15% Tajiks, 5% Hazaras.
Saydabad	Saydabad	131,264	1,130	116	Predominantely Pashtuns.
Wardak		660,258	10,348	64	63.9% Pashtuns (62.0% Pashtun tribes, 1.9% Kochis), 33.5% Hazaras, 2.5% Tajiks.

== Economy ==
In terms of industry, one marble factory is working in the province, and there are marble mines in the provincial center and Sayed Abad District although no mining is currently undertaken there due to the government ban. The majority of commercial activity in Maidan Shahr. Wardak is related to trade in agricultural and livestock products, although stone quarrying is also a growing business in the area. The people from Maidan Shahr are also experts in karez cleaning and repair and go to other parts of the country for this purpose. In Wardak, there are many natural resources like petroleum, iron, rubies, and emeralds.

Agriculture is a major source of revenue for 43% of households in Wardak province. Four-fifths (79%) of rural households own or manage agricultural land or garden plots in the province. However, nearly a quarter (24%) of households in the province derive income from trade and services, and around half (45%) of households earn some income through non-farm related labor.

== Demographics ==
=== Population ===
As of 2021, the total population of Wardak province is about 671,817.

=== Ethnicity, languages and religion ===
The province is predominantly Pashtun and Hazaras with Tajiks making up most of the remainder of the population. The Tajiks live primarily in northern districts of the province while the Hazaras live in the western part of the province and the Pashtuns live in the south and east. The province also has a small population of Qizilbash.

Estimated ethnolinguistic and -religious composition
Ethnicity	Pashtun	Hazara	Tajik/ Farsiwan	Others	Sources
Period	Pashtun	Hazara	Tajik/ Farsiwan	Others	Sources

2004–2021 (Islamic Republic)	70%	27–30%		∅	
2020 EU	1st	2nd	3rd	–	–
2018 UN	majority	∅	∅	–	
2015 NPS	∅ (Note: incl. Kochi.)	∅	∅	∅ (Note: incl. Qizilbash.)	
2011 PRT	70% (Note: excl. Kochi.)	27%		–	
2011 USA	70%	27%		–	
2009 ISW	70%	30%		–	

Legend:
- ∅: Ethnicity mentioned in source but not quantified
- –: Ethnicity not mentioned specifically
- Source abbreviations: Empirical sources: –, Government sources: EU – European Union Agency for Asylum, PRT – Provincial Reconstruction Team of the United States government, UN – United Nations Assistance Mission in Afghanistan, Editorial sources: ISW – Institute for the Study of War, NPS – Naval Postgraduate School, USA – United States Army

=== Education ===
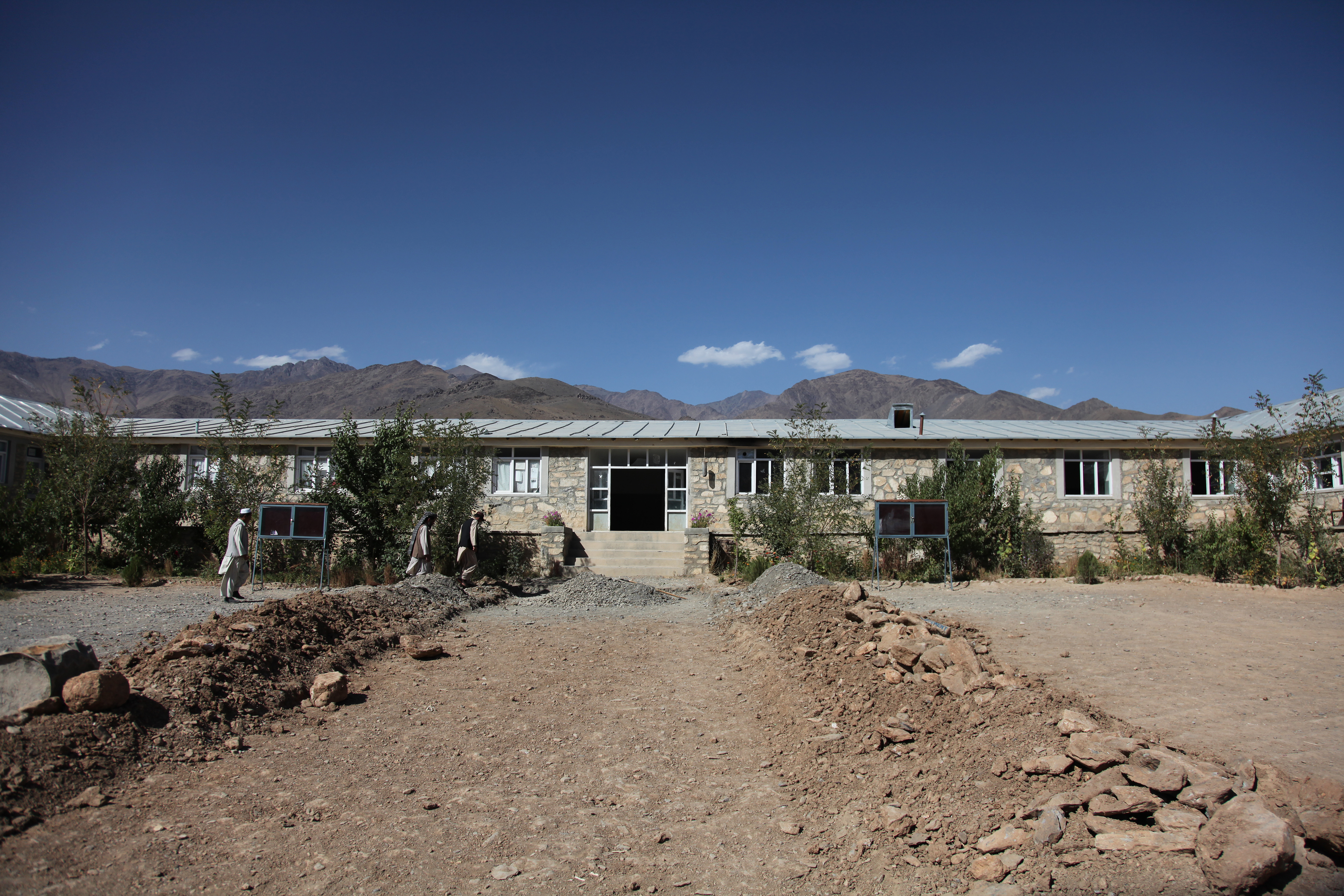
A school being renovated in the Jalrez District of Wardak province in 2009

The overall literacy rate in Wardak province is 25%. There are around 251 primary and secondary schools in the province catering for 105,358 students. There are 2909 teachers teaching in these schools.

== Notable people ==
- Adela Mohseni, women's rights activist

== See also ==
- Wardak (Pashtun tribe)
- Provinces of Afghanistan
