= Ahmad Shah Durrani =

Founder of the Durrani Empire

Ahmad Shah Durrani احمد شاه دراني
- King, Pearl of the Pearls (Note: Persian: شاه در دران, romanized: Shāh Durr-i Durrān); The World Conqueror (Note: Persian: جهانگشا, romanized: Jahāngushā)
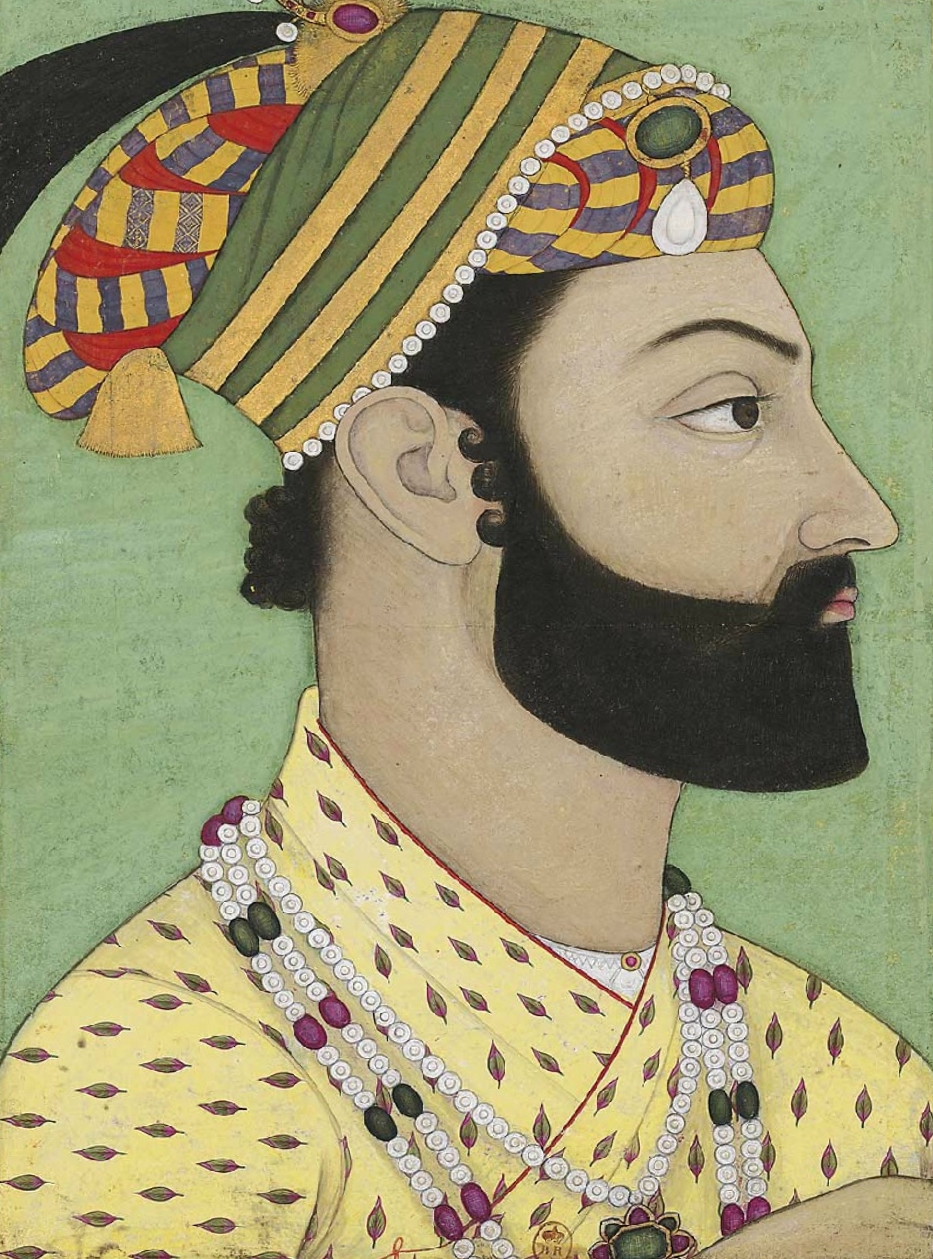
- Mughal miniature of Ahmad Shah Durrani, c. 1757

Shah of the Durrani Empire
- Reign: 23 July 1747 – 17 October 1772
- Coronation: 23 July 1747
- Predecessor: Office established (Nader Shah as the Shah of Iran)
- Successor: Interregnum (1772): Sulaiman Shah Durrani; Timur Shah Durrani
- Born: Ahmad Khan Abdali; 1720–1722; Herat, Sadozai Sultanate of Herat, or Multan, Mughal Empire
- Died: 17 October 1772; Maruf, Durrani Empire
- Burial: 17 October 1772; Tomb of Ahmad Shah Durrani, Kandahar
- Spouse: Hazrat Begum (m. 1757) Iffat-un-Nissa Begum (m. 1757)
- Issue: Timur Shah; Sulaiman Shah; 2 or 3 other sons
- Dynasty: Durrani
- Father: Mohammad Zaman Khan
- Mother: Zarghona Anaa
- Religion: Sunni Islam (Note: School of Jurisprudence: Hanafi)
- Military career
- Allegiance: Afsharid Iran (1738–1747); Durrani Empire (1747–1772)
- Branch: Persian Army; Afghan Army
- Service years: 1738–1772
- Rank: Ispahsalar, Shah
- Conflicts: List: Military campaigns; Nader Shah's invasion of India; Khyber Pass (1738); Karnal (1739); Delhi (1739); Ottoman–Persian War (1743–1746); Rise to power; Quchan (1747); Farah (1747); Kabul campaign; Qalati Ghilji (1747); Ghazni (1747); Kabul (1747); First invasion of India; Lahore (1748); Manupur (1748); Khorasan (1749—1751); Herat (1749–1750); Nun (1750); Mashhad (1750); Nishapur (1750–1751); Third invasion of India; Lahore (1752); Khorasan (1754–1755); Tabas (1754); Mashhad (1754); Nishapur (1755); Fourth invasion of India; Sack of Delhi (1757); Ballabhgarh (1757); Gokul (1757); Kalat Rebellion; Mastung (1758); Kalat (1758); Fifth invasion of India; Taraori (1759); Barari Ghat (1760); Sikandarabad (1760); Aligarh (1760); Samalkha (1760); Meerut (1760); Panipat III (1761); Sixth invasion of India; Kup (1762); Barnala (1762); Amritsar (1762); Pipli Sahib (1762); Ravi (1762); Seventh invasion of India; Chenab (1764); Qarawal (1764); Amritsar (1764); Jalandhar Doab (1765); Rupar Ghat (1765); Sutlej (1765); Nurmahal (1765); Kapurthala (1765); Beas (1765); Eighth invasion of India; Behgy (1766); Jhelum (1766); Amritsar (1767); Mani Majra (1767); Bukharan war (1768); Ninth invasion of India; Jhelum (1769); Khorasan (1769—1770); Mashhad (1769—1770)

Ahmad Shah Durrani (Note: Pashto: احمد شاه دراني, romanized: Ahmad Šāh Durrāni [ʔɑ.mäd̪/ʔäh.mäd̪ ʃɑ(h) d̪u(ɾ).ɾɑ.ni]; Persian: احمد شاه درانی, romanized: Ahmad Shāh Durrānī [ʔɑː.mád̪/ʔäɦ.mád̪ ʃɑː(ʱ) d̪ʊɾ.ɾɑː.níː]) (born Ahmad Khan Abdali; c. 1720–1722 – 16–23 October 1772) was the first ruler and founder of the Durrani Empire. He is often regarded as the founder of modern Afghanistan. As Shah, he relentlessly led military campaigns for over 25 years across West Asia, Central Asia, and South Asia, creating one of the largest Islamic empires in the world, encompassing Afghanistan, much of Pakistan, Iranian Khorasan, and parts of Northern India.

Born between 1720 and 1722, Ahmad Shah accompanied Nader Shah in his campaigns until Nader's assassination in 1747, which resulted in the division of the Afsharid Empire. Ahmad Shah took advantage and was crowned near Kandahar, establishing his rule in Afghanistan and founding the Durrani Empire.

In 1748, he invaded the Mughal Empire and began a series of invasions into India that would span the next 24 years. Following his third invasion of India, Ahmad Shah annexed Punjab and Kashmir from the Mughals. His forays continued, including the occupation and sacking of Delhi in 1757 during his fourth invasion, and the annihilation of Maratha armies at the Third Battle of Panipat, the largest battle of the 18th century, during his fifth. Outside of India, he campaigned in Khorasan and Afghan Turkestan, subjugating the Afsharids, crossed swords with the Khanate of Bukhara, and had diplomatic encounters with Qing China. In his later reign, he led numerous invasions against the Sikhs to maintain control over the Punjab. Years of nonstop campaigning took a toll on his health, and he died in 1772 in Maruf. He was buried in Kandahar, where his mausoleum is located.

Throughout his reign, Ahmad Shah fought over fifteen major military campaigns. Nine of them were centered in present-day India, (Note: He attempted a total of twelve invasions of India. See his tenth, eleventh, and twelfth attempted invasions.) three in Khorasan, and three in Afghan Turkestan. Having rarely lost a battle, historians widely recognize Ahmad Shah as a brilliant military leader and tactician, typically being compared to military leaders such as Marlborough, Mahmud of Ghazni, Babur, and Nader Shah. Ahmad Shah has been described as one of the greatest military leaders of eighteenth century Asia, as well the "greatest general of Asia of his time", and as one of the greatest conquerors in Asian history.

His campaigns, however, left the Indian subcontinent in complete chaos and contributed to the decline of Muslim power in Northern India, with Ahmad Shah overseeing several indiscriminate massacres throughout his campaigns as well as pillaging, and mass enslavement conducted by Afghan soldiers.

== Name and title ==
His birth name was Ahmad Khan, and he was born into the Abdali tribe of Pashtuns. After his accession to power in 1747, he became known as Ahmad Shah. His tribe also changed their name from Abdali to Durrani. Afghans often refer to him as Ahmad Shāh Bābā, meaning "Ahmad Shah the Father".

In historical sources, his tribe's name is interchangeably used between Abdali and Durrani, and he is commonly referred to by names including Ahmad Shah Abdali. Eventually, Ahmad Shah would forbid the usage of the old tribal name of Abdali, rather insisting on the usage of Durrani instead, an act likely done to ward off other rival Abdali claimants.

== Early life ==
Ahmad Shah was born between 1720 and 1722, with sources differing on whether his birthplace was in Herat in present-day Afghanistan; or Multan in present-day Pakistan. Modern scholarship generally favours Multan as his birthplace. However, this is disputed by historian Sajjad Nejatie, who argues the majority of sources from Ahmad Shah's time state he was born in Herat and not in Multan, including the Tarikh-i Ahmad Shahi, a primary source commissioned by Ahmad Shah himself.

His father, Zaman Khan, was the Sultan of Herat. Zaman Khan had died in 1721, and as a result, Ahmad Shah was raised alongside his brother Zulfiqar Khan in Shindand and Farah. In the mid-1720s, Zulfiqar Khan was invited to rule Herat. Ahmad Shah does not appear in historical records again until 1731–1732, when Zulfiqar Khan was defeated by the Iranian monarch Nader Shah. This forced both Zulfiqar Khan and Ahmad Shah to flee to Kandahar, where they remained political prisoners of Hussain Hotak, the Hotak king.

After Nader Shah conquered Kandahar, Ahmad Shah and Zulfiqar Khan were freed. Ahmad Shah spent much of his early life in the service of Nader Shah. Accompanying him on his invasion of India between 1738 and 1739. Ahmad Shah was later resettled in Mazandaran along with his brother. According to the Encyclopædia Iranica, Ahmad Shah may have been appointed governor of Mazandaran. After the death of his brother, Ahmad Shah enlisted in the Afsharid military in 1742. Some sources suggest only Zulfiqar Khan went to Mazandaran, while Ahmad Shah remained in Nader Shah's service as an officer.

During Nader Shah's invasion of India, Ahmad Shah possibly commanded a regiment of Durrani tribesmen. His forces participated in the sacking of Delhi and were involved in massacres during the invasion. According to legend, Nizam ul-Mulk, the Mughal governor of Hyderabad, supposedly an expert in physiognomy, predicted Ahmad Shah would become king. Nader Shah is said to have taken notice, clipping part of Ahmad Shah's ear as a symbolic gesture, reportedly saying: "When you become a king, this will remind you of me". Nader Shah also requested Ahmad Shah be generous with his descendants. Nejatie is sceptical of the account, and remarks that evidence of Ahmad Shah being fully involved in the campaign is inconclusive.

In 1744, Ahmad Shah was promoted to Nader Shah's personal staff. In a campaign against the Ottomans, Ahmad Shah distinguished himself and was permitted to raise a contingent of 3–4,000 Durrani tribesmen by Nader Shah. The unit became one of Nader Shah's most trusted units, and he increasingly relied on it to suppress the influence of his other commanders, whom he suspected of plotting a rebellion or his assassination.

=== Death of Nader Shah ===
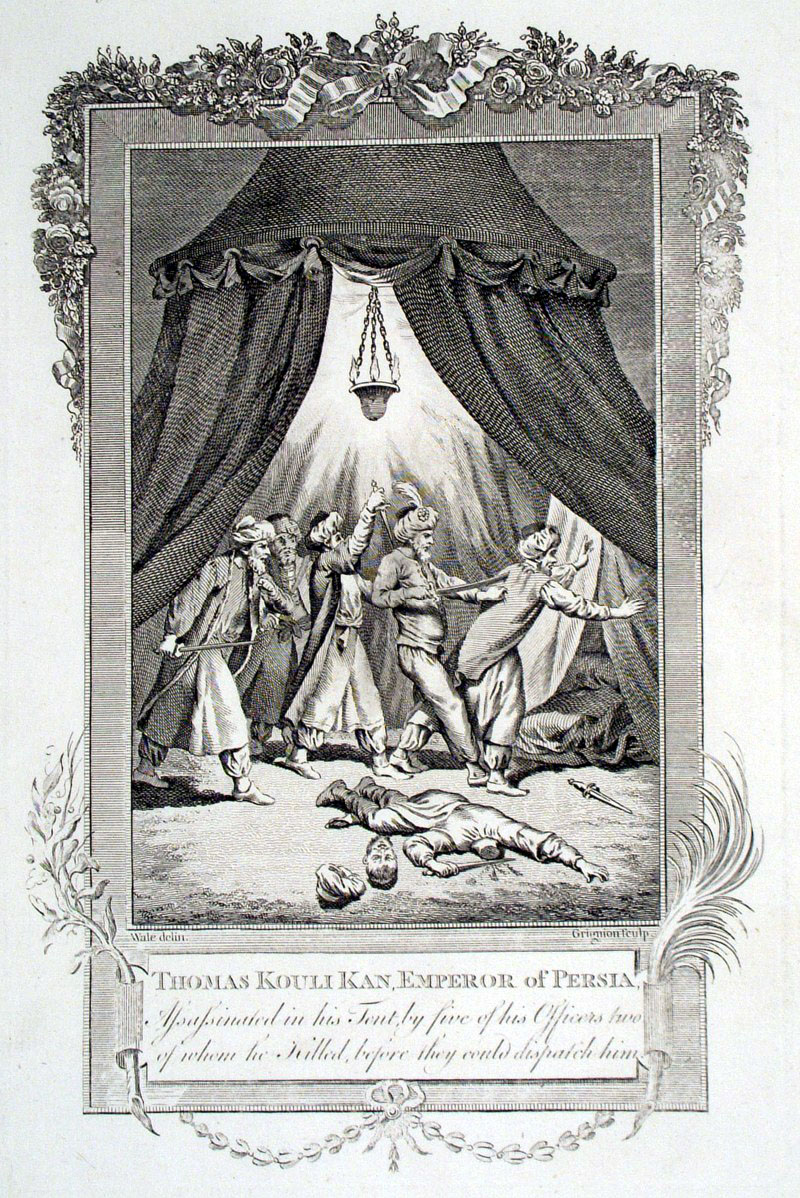
Nader Shah's assassination in 1747

In June 1747, Nader Shah was convinced his personal guard intended to assassinate him. As a result, he summoned Ahmad Shah and other loyal commanders. Nader Shah ordered Ahmad Shah to assemble his Durrani regiments and to arrest his personal guard. If the personal guard resisted, Ahmad Shah was given permission to kill them all. He was ordered to do this at first light. Nader Shah then chose to sleep with his favourite wife, but did so outside the royal tent, where the same guards he had accused of treachery presumed night duty. Meanwhile, Ahmad Shah with his regiments was stationed at the defences of the camp.

News of Nader Shah's plan leaked, with the conspirators being forced to act. Four conspirators entered the royal enclosure and Nader Shah's tent at Quchan, assassinating him. Chaos ensued afterward, and plans to cover up the killing by the conspirators failed. They resorted to pillaging the royal enclosure while news of Nader Shah's death rapidly spread. The next morning, the royal guard attacked Ahmad Shah's forces, who drove away the Persians and Qizilbash despite being heavily outnumbered. Ahmad Shah then entered the tent of Nader Shah, taking the Koh-i-Noor diamond and a signet ring from his body.

== Return to Kandahar ==
Having driven off the Persians and Qizilbash, Ahmad Shah departed for Kandahar with his regiments, and his Uzbek ally, Hajji Bi Ming. Ahmad Shah first resolved the dispute of leadership, asserting himself as the leader of Durrani tribesmen by forcing the former leader to step down. Ahmad Shah also killed 'Abd al-Ghani Khan, his uncle and the governor of Kandahar to consolidate full control over the Durrani regiments. Following this act, his forces grew to over 6,000 men.

Ahmad Shah then moved through Khabushan, advancing to Kashmar. On the way, Ahmad Shah accumulated supplies for his army before proceeding to Torbat-e Heydarieh, where he received news that Adel Shah had dispatched a force to block the Afghan advance. Ahmad Shah responded by leading his forces to Tun and then Farah, where they defeated Adel Shah's army. With Farah under his control, the Afghans continued on to Grishk, and then Kandahar.

While en route to Kandahar, Ahmad Shah recovered a military convoy carrying the annual tribute from Sindh. Estimates of the convoy's value vary widely, ranging from 3 to 260 million rupees. The convoy was escorted by Mohammad Taqi Khan Shirazi, a disgruntled former officer of Nader Shah, and Nasir Khan, the governor of Kabul and Peshawar. Taqi Khan joined Ahmad Shah and divided the wealth, while Nasir Khan refused and was subsequently imprisoned. He was later released on the conditions he pay an annual tribute of 500,000 rupees and acknowledge Ahmad Shah's suzerainty. Following this, Ahmad Shah's army grew to over 18,000 men, and came to include war elephants. Sindh would also enter Afghan suzerainty and see tribute imposed by Ahmad Shah during this period.

=== Accession and coronation ===
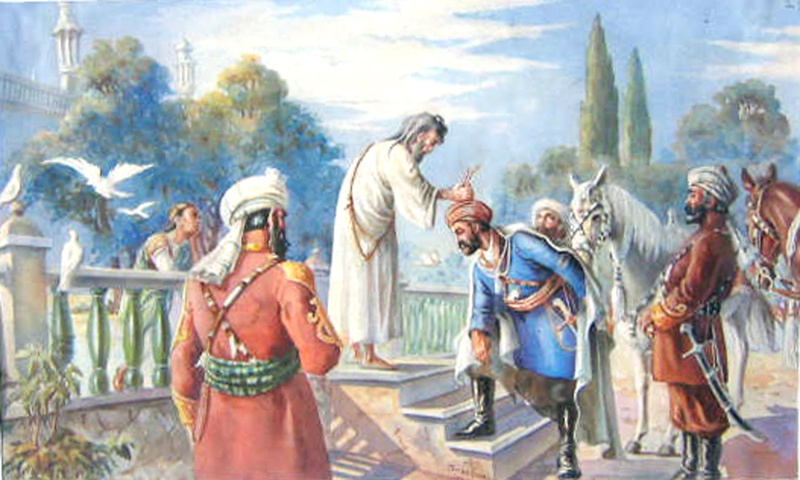
Legendary coronation of Ahmad Shah Durrani by Abdali chiefs at Kandahar in 1747, as envisioned by 20th-century Afghan painter Breshna

Upon reaching Kandahar, Ahmad Shah encamped in Naderabad and prepared to be crowned king. According to legend, Ahmad Shah declared a Jirga summoning all tribal leaders, who unanimously selected Ahmad Shah as king. A piece of wheat or barley was then placed on Ahmad Shah's turban. Historian Ganda Singh cites this account, despite no contemporary evidence suggesting this event ever occurred.

In reality, Ahmad Shah was brought to power through a nine-man military council. Ahmad Shah's accession was disputed by Jamal Khan, the leader of the Barakzai tribe. The Barakzai were the most powerful clan of the Durranis centered in the Kandahar and Helmand regions. The dispute over accession continued until an agreement was made where Jamal Khan would submit to Ahmad Shah as king, while Ahmad Shah would make Jamal Khan and his descendants wazir. With an agreement reached, Sabir Shah, Ahmad Shah's advisor, took a piece of greenery or stalk and attached it to Ahmad Shah's cap, officially crowning him. Scholars state Ahmad Shah's rise to power was effectively a military coup rather than an election.

Following his accession, Ahmad Shah adopted the title of Padishah, and the epithet "Durr-i Durrān", meaning "Pearl of Pearls", also changing the name of his tribe from Abdali to Durrani.

== Reign as Shah (1747–1772) ==
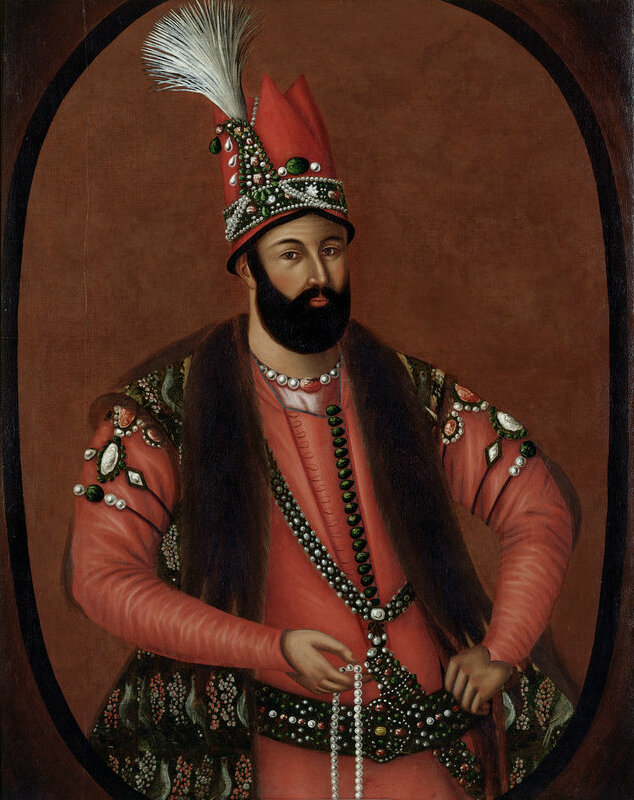
Portrait of Nader Shah, who Ahmad Shah often envisioned himself as his successor.

=== Administration ===
At the beginning of his rule, Ahmad Shah's empire consisted of Kandahar, Helmand, and Farah. The Hazaras of Bala Murghab and the Khanate of Kalat ruled by Nasir Khan also came under Afghan suzerainty. However, Ahmad Shah had no administrative experience, neither did most of his closest advisors. As a result, he chose to adopt a government style similar to the Mughals and Safavids, with his main idea of a government based on an absolute monarchy. A tribal council ruled in hand with Ahmad Shah, serving as a type of cabinet. However, Ahmad Shah had made the positions of his cabinet hereditary, thus making it difficult to dismiss advisors without causing conflict. Their roles, were almost purely de-jure, and tasks were delegated to subordinates.

The civil service of the empire was dominated by the Qizilbash, as most of the Durrani elite were illiterate. The Qizilbash also significantly formed the major part of Ahmad Shah's bodyguard, counterbalancing other Durrani leaders and tribes. These complications and effectively divided government made the administration's functioning difficult, and caused ethnic tension between the Qizilbash and the tribal council of Ahmad Shah.

Further complications erupted in Ahmad Shah's administration after he exempted his own tribe from taxation. Other Afghan tribes and ethnicities were discontent with this, as they were also not allowed to serve in the administration of the empire. This disquiet was further exacerbated by Ahmad Shah when he gave the right of revenue collection to the highest bidder. The victors of these auctions, typically members of Ahmad Shah's own tribe, were completely free in taxing as much as they wished. While members of the Durrani tribe rapidly became rich, some landholders were pushed into complete debt, forcing many to sell their lands or flee the kingdom. Their land was also likely to be bought by the Durranis who had driven them to bankruptcy.

Ahmad Shah envisioned himself as the successor of Nader Shah. Instead of establishing a capable administration, Ahmad Shah focused on wars and military campaigns to supply his treasury, with any downturns easily being covered by the treasures of war. Throughout his reign, he rarely spent his time in Kandahar, the capital of his empire, and instead pursued military campaigns, returning only to restore stability after conflict. By the end of his reign, Ahmad Shah had launched over fifteen military campaigns, nine of them in India, three in Khorasan, and three in Afghan Turkestan.

=== Objectives ===
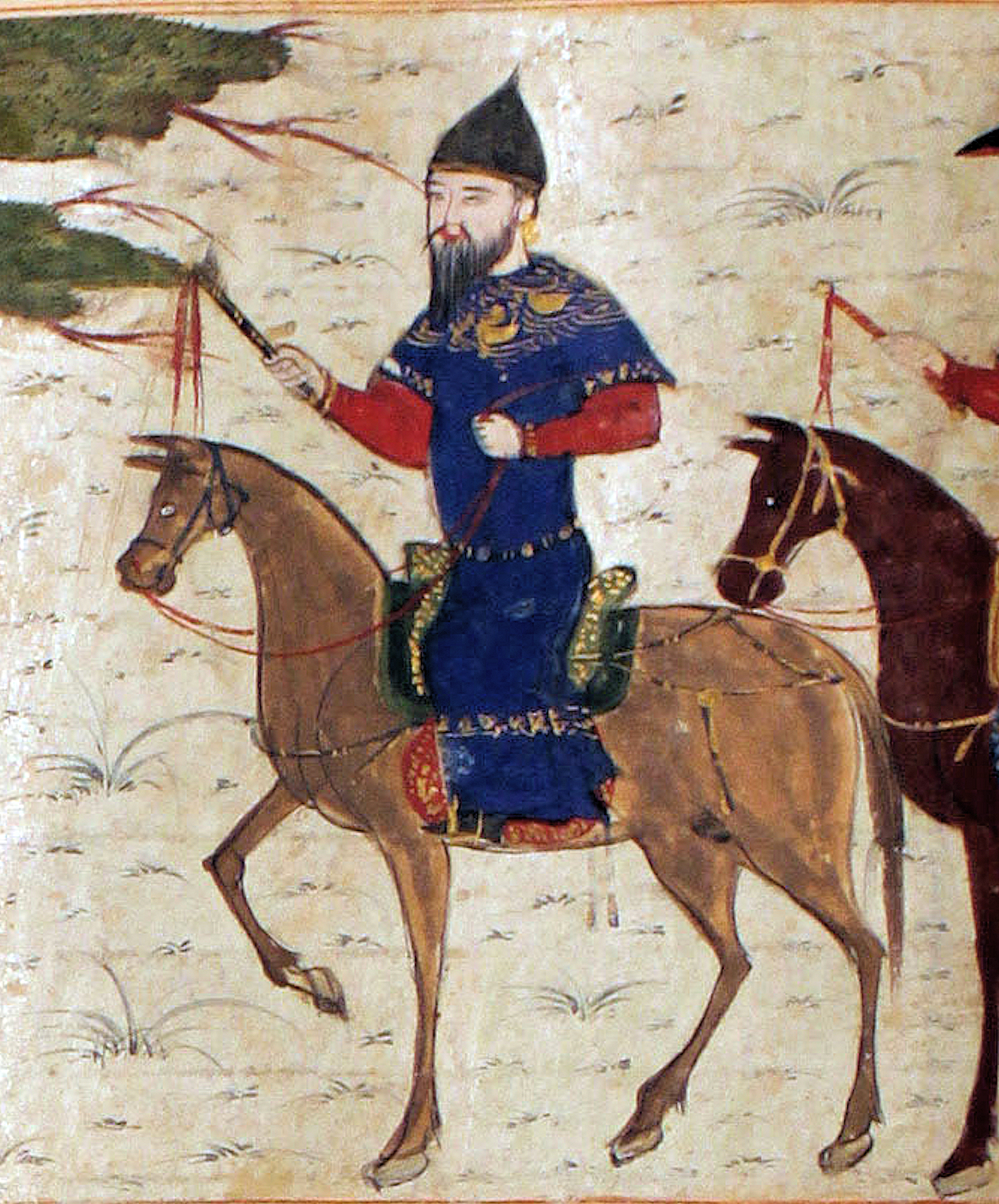
Depiction of Mahmud of Ghazni. Ahmad Shah is typically compared with him, with Mahmud himself having launched over 17 invasions of India.

Afghanistan was a relatively poor country at the time. As a result, Ahmad Shah, following in the footsteps of conquerors before him such as Mahmud of Ghazni, invading India to plunder and obtain wealth. Adopting the practices of Muhammad of Ghor, he also invaded India to establish his own political dominance. The power vacuum following the decline of the Mughal Empire allowed him to repeat extensive campaigns, while also reviving the prominence of Afghans in India. Furthermore, by institutionalizing the casus belli of holy war, Ahmad Shah was able to direct the majority of his campaigns toward India. He also saw invasions as the proper way to propagate his strength, as Afghan chiefs and nobility initially saw him as an upstart, and as a result, Ahmad Shah sought victories to legitimize himself.

== Military campaigns ==
=== Campaign to Kabul (1747) ===
Weeks after Ahmad Shah's accession, Nasir Khan, the governor of Kabul, Ghazni, and Peshawar revolted against him. Ahmad Shah had previously imprisoned Nasir Khan and ransomed him for an annual tribute of 500,000 rupees. While Nasir Khan was attempting to raise this amount, the Ghilzai tribes refused to pay their taxes to the Durranis, and only wished to do so to their Mughal sovereign, Muhammad Shah. With a growing Ghilzai revolt, Nasir Khan declared his independence from Durrani suzerainty and began raising an army of Uzbeks and Hazaras, while also frantically asking Muhammad Shah for aid.

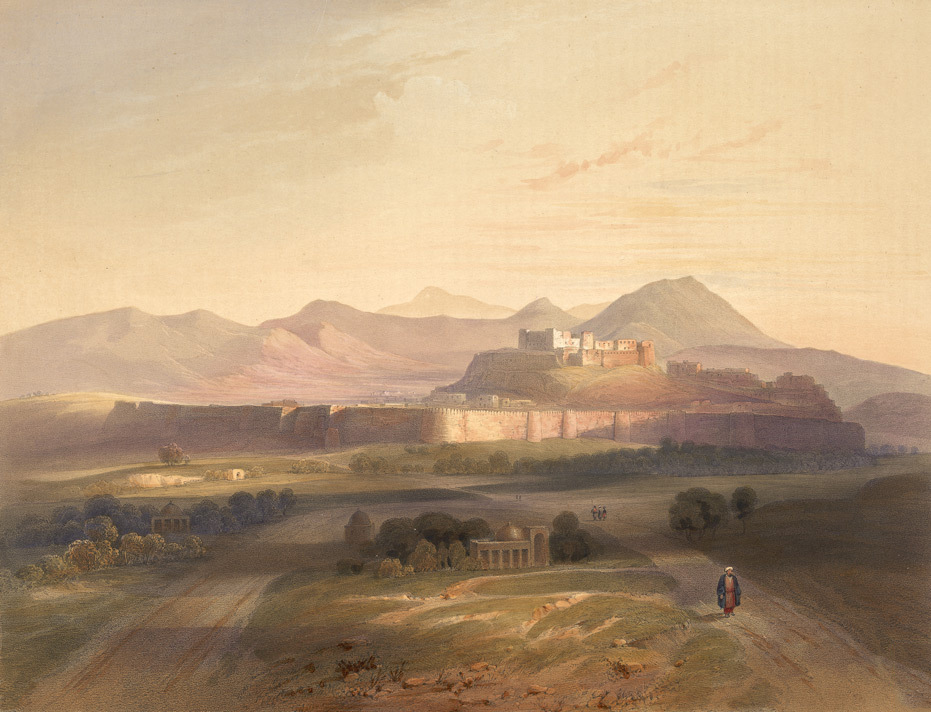
Lithograph depicting the city of Ghazni and its citadel

In autumn 1747, Ahmad Shah began his campaign against Nasir Khan. Appointing his nephew Luqman Khan as the regent in Kandahar while he left on campaign, Ahmad Shah marched with his army toward Ghazni only to be halted at Qalati Ghilji by his former allies, the Tokhi Ghilzai. Ahmad Shah stormed the fortress of Qalati, bringing the Tokhis to submission and annexing their lands over the following decades. Ahmad Shah continued towards Ghazni, defeating the governor deputed there and conquering it with little opposition.

Before advancing on Kabul, Ahmad Shah garnered the support of the Suleimankhel tribes in the region, while Taqi Khan managed to secure the defection of the Qizilbash garrison in Kabul so they would hand over the city once the Afghan army arrived. The acceptance of these terms forced Nasir Khan to flee to Peshawar, and when Ahmad Shah arrived at Kabul in October 1747, the Qizilbash handed over the Bala Hissar fortress. Ahmad Shah awarded the Qizilbash by giving them districts in Chindawol and Murad Khani.

=== First invasion of India (1747–1748) ===
With Kabul under his control, Ahmad Shah dispatched his Commander-in-chief, Jahan Khan, toward Peshawar with the intention of advancing as far as Attock. Jahan Khan quickly overran Jalalabad, and Nasir Khan was unable mount a defence at the Khyber Pass, forcing him to flee. The Afghan armies approached Peshawar, prompting many Pashtun tribes to declare support for them, including the Yusufzai, Afridi, and Khattak. Overwhelmed, Nasir Khan withdrew from Peshawar and fled to Delhi.

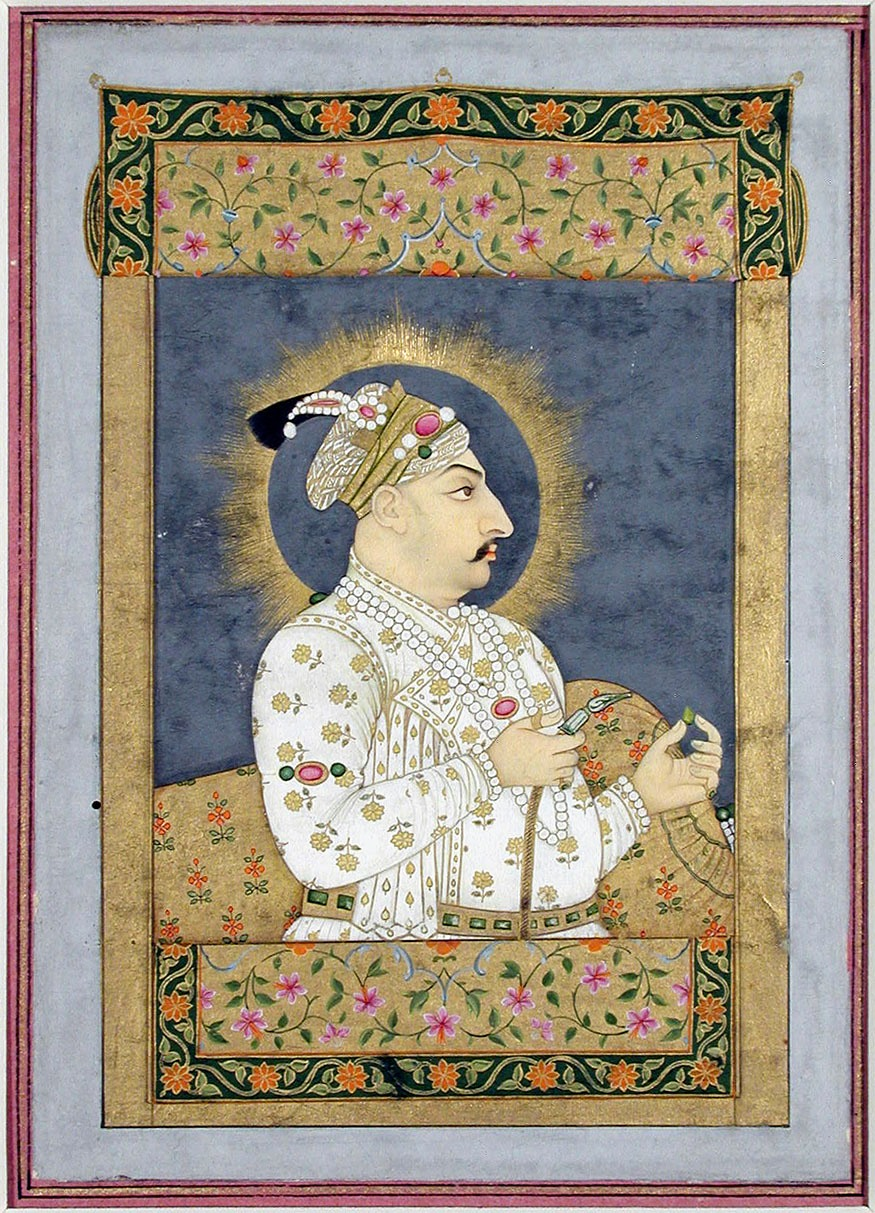
Portrait of Mughal emperor Muhammad Shah

Shāh Nawāz Khān, the Mughal governor of Punjab, opened correspondence with the Afghans after they had seized Peshawar. Shah Nawaz, having toppled his brother from power to assume control over Punjab, was opposed by the Mughal emperor Muhammad Shah, who refused to recognize him as governor. As a result, the Afghans promised to affirm Shah Nawaz as governor of Punjab if he accepted Durrani suzerainty. Shah Nawaz accepted this offer, but the Mughal vizier promised to confirm him as governor if he opposed the Afghan invasion instead, which Shah Nawaz accepted.

The betrayal saw Ahmad Shah dispatch Sabir Shah to try and convince Shah Nawaz once again. However, after insulting Shah Nawaz, Sabir Shah was imprisoned and executed, and Shah Nawaz began marching against the Afghan army. Ahmad Shah crossed the Ravi River on 10 January, and encamped at the Shalimar Gardens outside Lahore. The armies of Shah Nawaz and Ahmad Shah fought the battle of Lahore on 11 January. When the battle began, the Afghan regiments of Shah Nawaz's army defected. Despite commanding a much larger army then the Afghans, the Mughals were defeated, and Shah Nawaz fled to Delhi.

With their victory, the Afghans entered Lahore, beginning to plunder the city and massacring its inhabitants. Thousands were also conscripted, while the Mughals began mobilizing a larger army. Ahmad Shah left Lahore on 19 February with 30,000 men, beginning to advance on Delhi. He captured Sirhind and continued advancing, outmaneuvering the Mughal forces until they met at Manupur, where they battled. The Afghan forces assembled 12,000 against the Mughal army of 60,000 to 70,000 combatants. The Afghan army pressed the attack until disaster struck when the ammunition stores of the Afghan army caught fire and exploded, incinerating 1,000 men and forcing a complete withdrawal from the battlefield. The Mughals did not pursue the Afghan army due to the death of Mughal emperor Muhammad Shah and the ensuing turmoil in the camp.

Withdrawing to Lahore, Ahmad Shah became aware that his nephew, Luqman Khan, who had been left as regent in Kandahar, had revolted. Ahmad Shah immediately returned to Afghanistan and marched on Kandahar, quickly quelling the revolt. He spent the summer of 1748 preparing for his second invasion of India. The timing was significant for Ahmad Shah, as Qamar-ud-Din, a significant commander for the Mughals at Manupur, had been killed, while Muhammad Shah's death saw him succeeded by Bahadur Shah, who largely focused on pleasure-seeking. Ahmad Shah also wished to avenge his defeat.

=== Second invasion of India (1748) ===
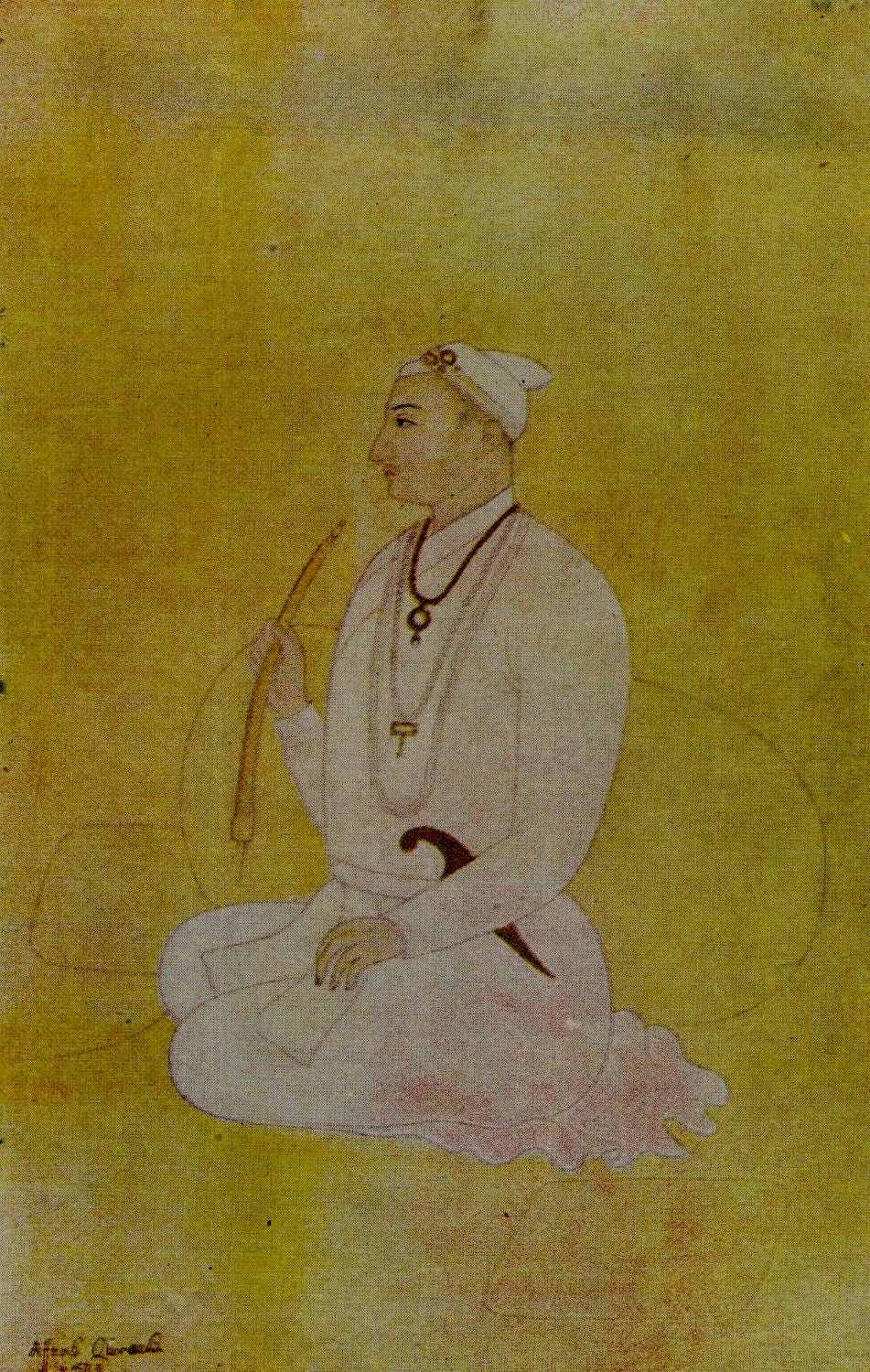
Portrait of Moin-ul-Mulk, the Mughal governor of the Lahore Subah (r. 1748–1753)

In November 1748, Ahmad Shah began his second invasion of India. Moin-ul-Mulk, the new governor of Punjab, urgently requested reinforcement from the Mughals in Delhi. Moin-ul-Mulk, who wanted to avoid fighting the Afghans on open plains, remained on the defensive at Sodhra, as an ongoing power struggle with Nasir Khan, the former Mughal governor of Kabul, threatened his position. As a result, Jahan Khan was able to raid the countryside, including the Chaj Doab, whilst a party of Sikhs raided Lahore.

Ahmad Shah advanced to Kopra and engaged in skirmishes with Moin-ul-Mulk's army. Overwhelmed with the rising power of the Sikhs and the Afghan invasion, Moin-ul-Mulk opened negotiations, ceding the revenues of Gujrat, Aurangabad, Sialkot, and Pasrur. These districts generated yearly revenues of 1.4 million rupees (equivalent to ₹996,148,044 in 2023). Ahmad Shah returned to Afghanistan following the treaty, crossing through Peshawar, Dera Ismail Khan, and Dera Ghazi Khan. The regions of Dera Ismail Khan and Dera Ghazi Khan fell as he returned to Afghanistan, confirming the former tribal chiefs as governors in the region under his suzerainty.

=== First Khorasan campaign (1749–1751) ===
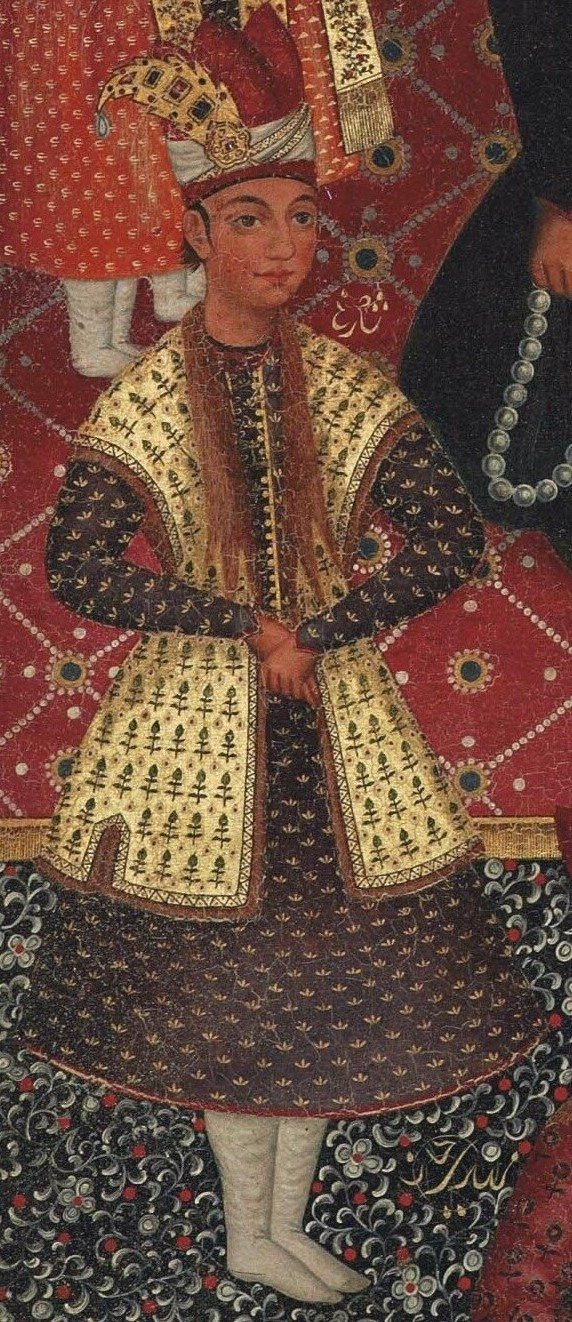
Detail of Shahrokh Shah, ruler of the Afsharids, in court

Between 1749 and 1750, after his second invasion of India, Ahmad Shah launched his first campaign into Khorasan. Intent on conquering Herat, Ahmad Shah besieged the city for a long period of time until it finally fell in late 1750. With the fall of Herat, Ahmad Shah continued his campaign into Khorasan, besieging the fortress of Nun in the viscinity of Mashhad where its governor subsequently surrendered after a short siege.

Ahmad Shah proceeded into Afsharid territory and initiated the siege of Mashhad, where he remained until November 1750. Attempts to storm the city by the Afghans were unsuccessful. Historians Jonathan Lee and Hari Ram Gupta state Iranian monarch Shahrokh Shah surrendered to Ahmad Shah personally so he could raise the siege. Shahrokh Shah accepted Afghan suzerainty, paying large tribute and releasing members of Ahmad Shah's family. However, historian Christine Noelle-Karimi states Ahmad Shah lifted the siege on 10 November, and was intent on returning years later. Shahrokh Shah had released a son of Ahmad Shah, possibly being Timur Shah Durrani, or Ahmad Shah's youngest son, Sanjar Mirza.

Nonetheless, after the siege of Mashhad, Ahmad Shah advanced to Nishapur, which was ruled by the Qara Bayat Amirdom. He besieged the city and demanded its surrender, its governor Jafar Khan refused despite only having a few thousand soldiers in the garrison. Ahmad Shah ordered the walls to be breached utilizing cannons, and the Afghans broke through. However, the defenders of the city had established defences and a trap, which the Afghans fell into. Close-quarters combat began after, in which Jafar Khan was killed. His nephew, Abbas Quli, took command of the garrison and repulsed the Afghan forces, inflicting horrific casualties on them, including some 12,000 dead, and thousands more wounded.

With his army seriously weakened, Ahmad Shah ordered a retreat to Herat. The harsh winter weather killed thousands while the Afghans retreated, and Ahmad Shah was forced to leave behind much of his baggage, including his artillery and food supplies. When the Afghans reached the Hari Rud river, it was completely frozen. Attempting to cross it caused much of the ice to break, killing even more men and sweeping away pack animals for the army. Upon the armies' return to Herat, Ahmad Shah faced an assassination conspiracy from Darwish Ali Khan Hazara, the Durrani governor of Herat. The conspiracy was quickly quelled, Darwish Ali was imprisoned, and Ahmad Shah appointed Timur Shah as the new governor.

=== Third invasion of India (1751–1752) ===
Possibly due to Ahmad Shah's struggle in Khorasan, Moin-ul-Mulk failed to pay the agreed tribute to Ahmad Shah from the revenues of Gujrat, Aurangabad, Sialkot, and Pasrur. This induced Ahmad Shah to invade India again in November 1751, leading his forces to invade Punjab. Moin-ul-Mulk immediately sent 900,000 rupees forward as tribute, which Ahmad Shah seized and continued his march. With the advance guard under Jahan Khan, Ahmad Shah led his forces through Rohtas, Gujrat, and Shahdara. Jahan Khan's forces pillaged the countryside while skirmishes began with Moin-ul-Mulk, who raised his own force to meet the Afghans in battle. The advance of Ahmad Shah triggered mass panic in Lahore, with many fleeing to Delhi or Jammu for safety.

In January 1752, Ahmad Shah forded the Ravi in secrecy at Ghazipur, before advancing on Lahore. Jahan Khan began advancing on Lahore as well, initially being driven out of Faiz Bagh and instead encamping at the Shalimar gardens. Moin-ul-Mulk immediately dashed back to Lahore, which the Afghans besieged for over four months. Receiving no aid from the Mughals or any other nobles, Moin-ul-Mulk settled for a pitched battle with the Afghans outside of Lahore.

On 6 March, after a fierce battle, Moin-ul-Mulk was defeated and surrendered to Ahmad Shah, who received him in person. Impressed by the efforts of Moin-ul-Mulk in his resistance, Ahmad Shah instated him as the governor of Lahore under Durrani suzerainty. However, Lahore was plundered and many people massacred. Ahmad Shah drafted a peace treaty with Moin-ul-Mulk, officiating the annexation of Punjab including Multan, Lahore and areas up to Sirhind to the Durrani Empire. The Mughal emperor Bahadur Shah signed the treaty on 3 April 1752, ending Mughal rule in Punjab.

Having conquered Punjab, Ahmad Shah also dispatched his general, Shah Pasand Khan, with 15,000 men to Kashmir, which was embroiled in civil war. In support of the deposed governor Mir Muqim, Afghan forces quickly occupied Srinagar and established complete control in the province.

=== Turkestan (1751–1768) ===
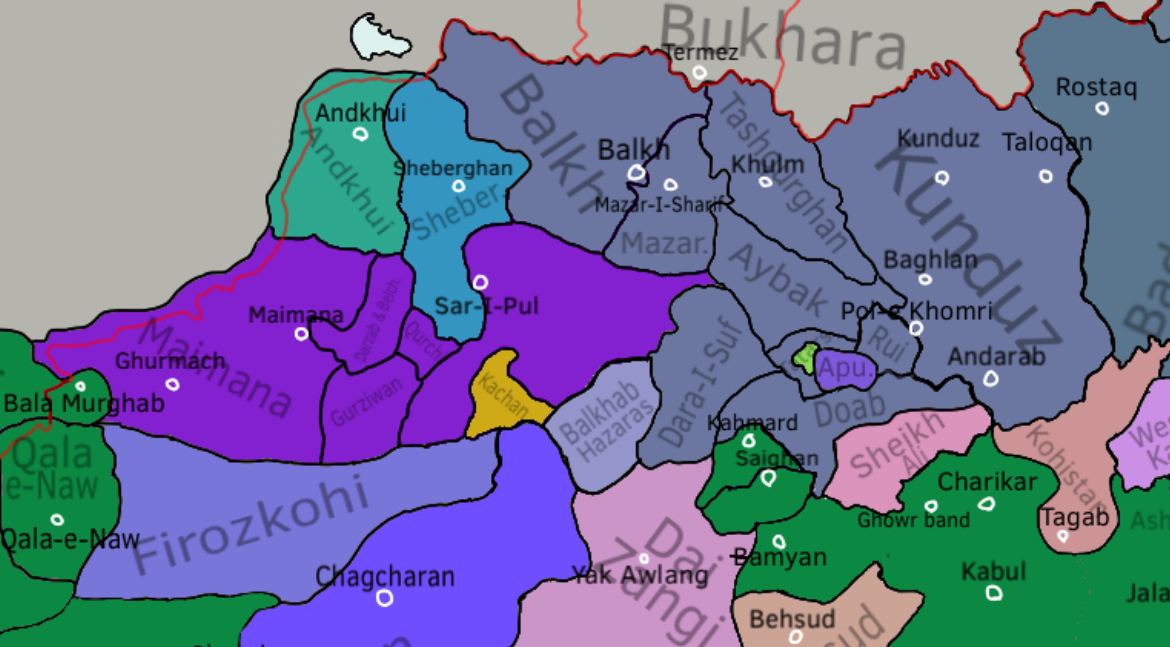
Map of Afghan Turkestan in January 1751. Balkh is still under the rule of the Kunduz Khanate.

At the start of Ahmad Shah's reign, he had friendly relations with Hajji Bi, the ruler of the Maimana Khanate, who had assumed control over the Chahar Wilayat. Coming into conflict against Hazara Bi, the ruler of Qataghan, Hajji Bi lost control over Balkh to the Qataghanids. In 1751, Hajji Bi travelled to Herat with a delegation of amirs, seeking Ahmad Shah's aid to reclaim Balkh. Ahmad Shah accepted the call to arms, forging an alliance with Hajji Bi, and sent thousands of Afghan and Qizilbash men under Allah Khan Turkman. Hajji Bi was also bestowed by Ahmad Shah with the titles of governor of Balkh and tax collector.

Not much information is given about the campaign against the Qataghanids. However, by the summer of 1752, the forces of the alliance were victorious, and Balkh was restored to the rule of the Maimana Khanate. During the campaign, a commander of one of the Afghan Qizilbash forces fought against Allah Khan, prompting Mizrab Bi, a son of Hazara Bi, to revolt in 1753. Hajji Bi urgently requested aid from Ahmad Shah again, he responded by sending 5,000 men. After being restored to Balkh, Hajji Bi pursued a campaign in Qataghan, and with aid from the Afghans, the revolt was put down. Mizrab Bi was brought to submission, and Badakhshan was subjugated as well.

In 1755–1756, Hajji Bi petitioned Ahmad Shah at Kabul to be made commander-in-chief of forces in Balkh. The request was accepted, stripping Allah Khan of his position. However, Hajji Bi became noted for his abuse of power in the position, triggering an investigation by the Afghans, who sent Allah Khan to oversee the affairs of the region. Allah Khan immediately declared the reports of oppression to be true, and was reinstated as commander-in-chief in Balkh. Ahmad Shah also declared a new governor of Balkh, Nawab Khan Alakozai.

Believing it was the beginning of the Afghans attempting to assert their own hegemony over all of Afghan Turkestan, Hajji Bi began plotting with Izbasar, the ruler of Sheberghan. The two began a rebellion that achieved little, ending in a pardon for both Hajji Bi and Izbasar. In 1761, Rahim Bi Manghit, the ruler of Bukhara, invaded Afghan Turkestan, intent on re-establishing Bukharan suzerainty over the region. Izbazar declared his loyalty to the ruler of Bukhara and aided in the invasion. Bukharan forces initially overran Aqcha before being defeated by Allah Khan, who built a pyramid with the head of dead Bukharan soldiers. Afghan forces continued to Aqcha, where the Bukharans and Izbasar were defeated again. Aqcha was besieged and another force of 8,000 Bukharans were sent to Aqcha to relieve the siege, only to be defeated by the combined forces of Allah Khan and Hajji Bi.

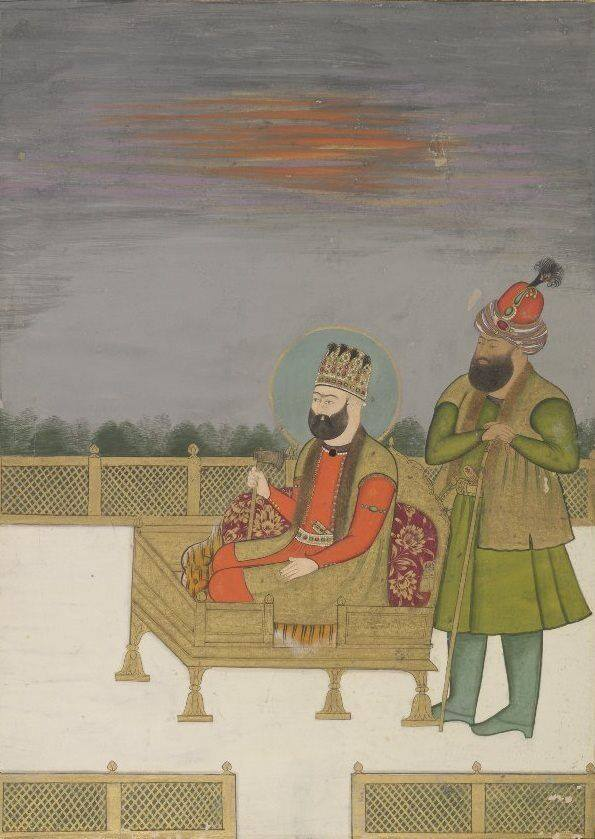
Depiction of Ahmad Shah Durrani alongside his vizier, Shah Wali Khan

Attempts to breach the walls of Aqcha failed, and negotiations began. The Bukharans withdrew across the Amu Darya, while Allah Khan was sent to Sheberghan to bring Izbasar into submission. However, Izbasar opened negotiations with Nawab Khan, who demanded Allah Khan be put to death due to an enmity between the two. Izbasar complied, executing Allah Khan, receiving a pardon from Nawab Khan as a result.

In 1768, a rebellion in Qataghan and Badakhshan prompted an invasion from Shah Murad Manghit, the next Bukharan ruler. Ahmad Shah sent 6,000 men under Shah Wali Khan to face the rebels. As a result, Shah Murad crossed the Amu Darya, advancing to Qarshi, and threatening to attack Aqcha. In response, Ahmad Shah mobilized an army, affirming his authority in Maimana, Andkhoy, Sheberghan, and Balkh as he advanced. This quickly brought Shah Murad to negotiations, who recognized Afghan control over Balkh, with the amirs of the Chahar Wilayat also submitting tribute to the Durranis. To further avoid a battle with the Afghans, Shah Murad surrendered the cloak of Muhammad after Ahmad Shah demanded it. With the cloak, Ahmad Shah established a shrine known as the Kirka Sharif in Kandahar, which was built next to his tomb.

=== Second Khorasan campaign (1754–1755) ===
In 1754, Ahmad Shah began preparing for a second campaign in Khorasan. During this time, Nishapur was besieged by Alam Khan, a former Afsharid viceroy. When Ahmad Shah began his invasion, Alam Khan's army completely dispersed, forcing his withdrawal to Sabzevar. Beginning his campaign in May 1754, Ahmad Shah departed from Herat with his army and advanced toward Tun. He dispatched Jahan Khan and Nasir Khan, the ruler of the Khanate of Kalat, to devastate the countryside. Following this, the Afghan forces marched against the governor of Tabas, Ali Murad Khan, who assembled his own army and met the Afghans in battle. Singh describes the battle that took place as one of the most bloodiest battles in Persian history. Ammunition failed to gain any clear advantage for both sides, forcing both armies to draw swords and began clashing. The battle remained indecisive until Ali Murad Khan was killed, and the remaining Persian army was completely routed.

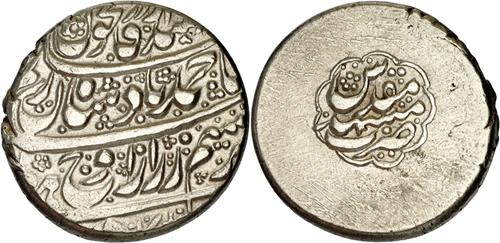
Coin of Ahmad Shah Durrani, minted in Mashhad, date unknown

With the Persians defeated, Tabas and Tun were conquered between June and July 1754 by the Afghans. Ahmad Shah then led his forces to Mashhad, arriving before the city on 23 July. A long siege protracted until the Afsharids finally submitted to Ahmad Shah on 1 December 1754. On the 4th, Ahmad Shah's name was read in the sermon, acknowledging his sovereignty over the Afsharids. With their victory, the Durranis annexed the territories of Torshiz, Bakharz, Jam, Khaf, and Turbat-e Haidari from the Afsharids. On 9 May 1755, Shahrokh Shah was officially re-instated as ruler over Mashhad, effectively as a Durrani protectorate. Ahmad Shah then began his march on Nishapur in the spring of 1755, while Shah Pasand Khan was dispatched toward Mazandaran against the Qajars.

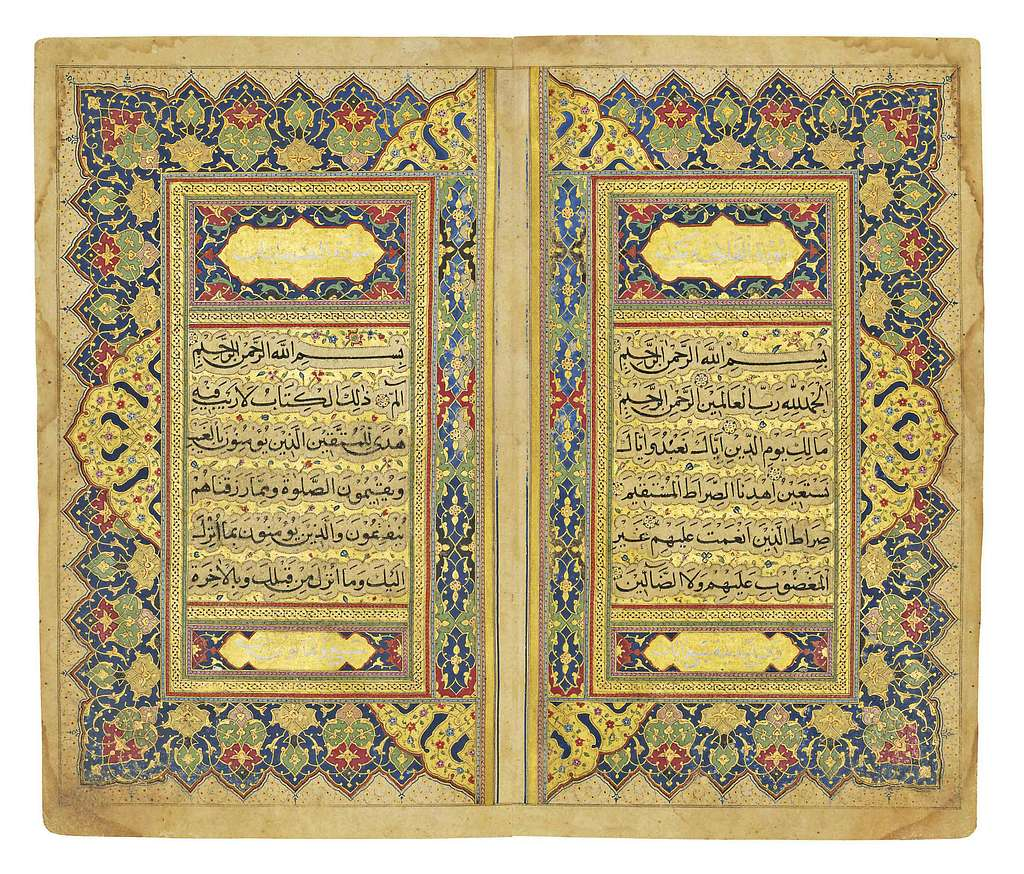
A Quran dedicated to Ahmad Shah Durrani, c. 1754

During the siege of Mashhad, the Camesgazak Kurd contingent of Alam Khan's forces completely defected to the Afghans, killing Alam Khan after dragging him from Sabzevar, which was conquered as a result. On 17 June 1755, the Afghan armies arrived at Nishapur, resulting in Abbas Quli's immediate submission. Abbas Quli sought to be pardoned for giving resistance during Ahmad Shah's first campaign. Not long after, however, Nishapur raised in rebellion due to news of Shah Pasand Khan being defeated by the Qajars. The gates of the city were closed on Ahmad Shah's troops, so the Afghans laid siege for one week. During the siege, Ahmad Shah lacked important siege equipment, and he solved this problem by having every mounted soldier carry kilograms of gunmetals. As the siege began, Ahmad Shah's Armenian cannon makers melted down the metal the soldiers had carried, forging a large cannon. The first shot of the cannon blasted through the city walls, and caused havoc in the city through houses and bazaars.

The weapon forced the submission of the city elders, and they opened the gates of the city despite Abbas Quli's opposition. The city was then plundered, with the populace of the city spared if they went to the mosques and did not take anything with them. Afghan forces went to houses and tore down the defences, razing significant portions of the city. Following the victory at Nishapur, Ahmad Shah defeated the Qajars and advanced further by sacking the cities of Tun and Tabas, carrying out massacres in these cities. Abbas Quli was initially captured by Ahmad Shah until he earned his favour. Abbas Quli married one of Ahmad Shah's daughters, while Ahmad Shah married Abbas Quli's sister. With these arrangements, Abbas Quli was allowed to return to Nishapur as governor of the city. He would remain close to Ahmad Shah throughout his life.

=== Fourth invasion of India (1756–1757) ===
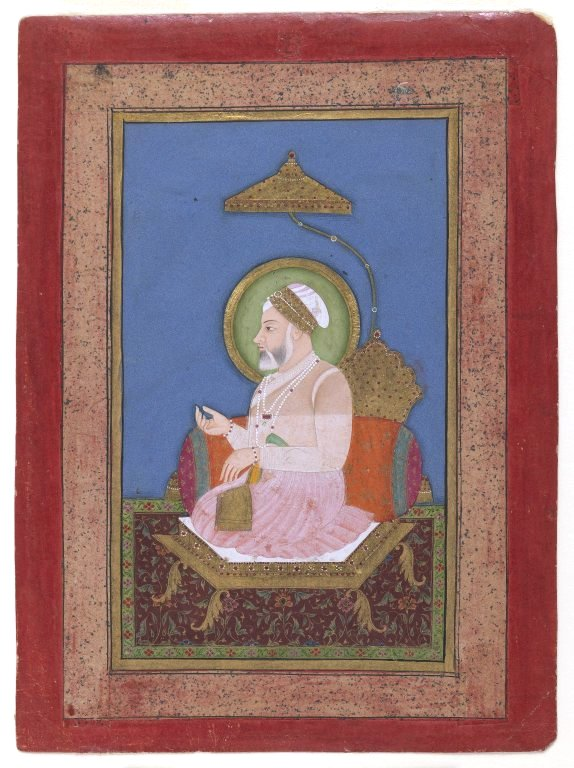
Portrait of Mughal emperor Alamgir II

Moin-ul-Mulk governed Punjab until his death in November 1753, and was succeeded by Mughlani Begum. In March 1756, Mughal vizier Imad ul-Mulk imprisoned her and deputed Adina Beg as the governor. Mughlani Begum pleaded Ahmad Shah to lead another invasion, promising him wealth. Due to the tyrannies of Imad ul-Mulk, several nobles such as Najib ud-Daula, a chief of Rohilkand, and the new Mughal emperor Alamgir II, pleaded for Ahmad Shah to invade. Ahmad Shah accepted the invitations and began his fourth invasion in November 1756, leaving Peshawar on the 15th, and crossing Attock on the 26th with an army of 80,000 men. He reached Lahore on 20 December, seizing the city with little resistance. Ahmad Shah garnered tribute from the city before continuing his march, crossing the Sutlej river on 10 January at Ludhiana, while the advance guard under his general, Jahan Khan, seized Sirhind, Karnal, and Panipat.

The Marathas, who had signed a treaty to protect the Mughals from foreign invasions in 1752, assembled a contingent of 3,400 men under Antaji Mankeshwar, battling the Afghans at Narela. The Maratha forces, however, were defeated and forced to withdraw with losses of 100 men. Following the defeat of the Marathas, Najib ud-Daula defected to the Afghans, with Imad ul-Mulk surrendering not long after. Jahan Khan continued his advance to Luni and besieged Shahdara on 17 January, with the Jama Masjid in Delhi reading Ahmad Shah's name in the Khutbah as a sign of sovereignty. The Afghan forces continued advancing on Delhi, arriving before the city on 28 January.

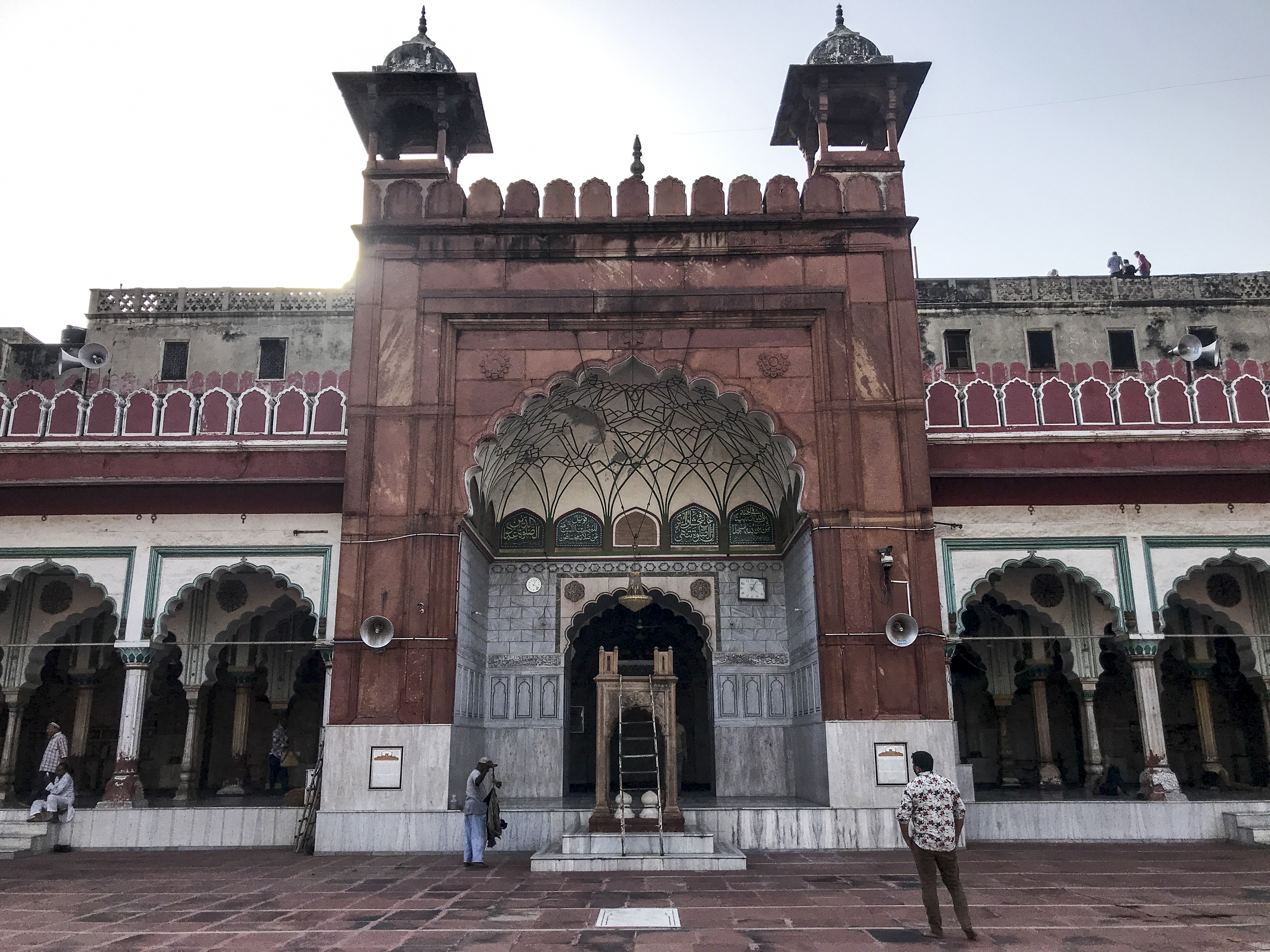
Fatehpuri Mosque, where Alamgir received Ahmad Shah before he entered Delhi

Meeting with Alamgir II at the Fatehpuri Mosque, Ahmad Shah led a grand entry into Delhi, which was marked with a gun salute. However, many inhabitants of the city had already fled or hidden, with the streets completely deserted. Many people barricaded themselves in their houses. Ahmad Shah's name was also inserted in the Khutbah for other mosques. Initially the Afghan army was ordered not to sack the city. Alamgir II was placed under house arrest, and houses outside the city of Delhi were ravaged. On the 29th, the bazaars of the city were sacked and Jahan Khan's soldiers extracted tribute from Feroz Shah Kotla, a large fortress in Delhi. On 30 January, Ahmad Shah minted coins in his name. He also married Hazrat Begum, a daughter of Alamgir II, while his son, Timur Shah, married another daughter of Alamgir.

Ahmad Shah then ordered all Hindus to wear distinctive marks on their head, and forbade non-Muslims from wearing a turban. Extortionate demands were also placed upon the Mughal nobility. The Mughal nobility refused, and Ahmad Shah dispatched his own tax collectors, demanding additional tribute. Those suspected of concealing valuables were subjected to torture, including foot whipping. Many thousands died or were crippled as a result, while others resorted to suicide. A tax was also imposed on every household in Delhi.

Imad ul-Mulk was forced to hand over gold and ornaments valued at 10 million rupees, and another 300,000 gold coins. Wazir Intizam-ud-Daulah was summoned, and many of his assets were confiscated, including over 10 million rupees and 100 of his wives. Unable to produce the required wealth, Intizam admitted his father had buried a fortune, which the Afghans uncovered. The Afghans recovered over 15 million rupees in cash, along with various goods, including 200 golden candles that were the size of a man. The treasure also included diamonds, rubies, pearls, and emeralds.

After sacking Delhi, Ahmad Shah campaigned against the Jats. Suraj Mal, the ruler of the Jats, initially submitted to Ahmad Shah, but refused to send asylum seekers from the sack of Delhi, resulting in conflict. An Afghan force was sent to Faridabad, seizing the fortress and razing it. However, a Jat raid under Jawahar Singh defeated the Afghans, massacring them. In response, Ahmad Shah laid siege to Ballabhgarh, while Jahan Khan and Najib ud-Daula were dispatched to loot the surrounding regions. They advanced toward Mathura, while Jawahar Singh met them for battle at Chaumuhan. The ensuing battle left between 10 and 12,000 dead on both sides combined, with an innumerable amount of men wounded as well.

Jawahar Singh alongside Antaji Mankeshwar reinforced Ballabhgarh. The cannon fire of the Afghans completely broke the defences of the fortress, forcing Jawahar to withdraw in the night, with Afghan forces seizing the city on 4 March. An expedition under Abdus Samad Khan, another of Ahmad Shah's generals, nearly arrested Jawahar Singh during an ambush, but Jawahar ultimately evaded capture.

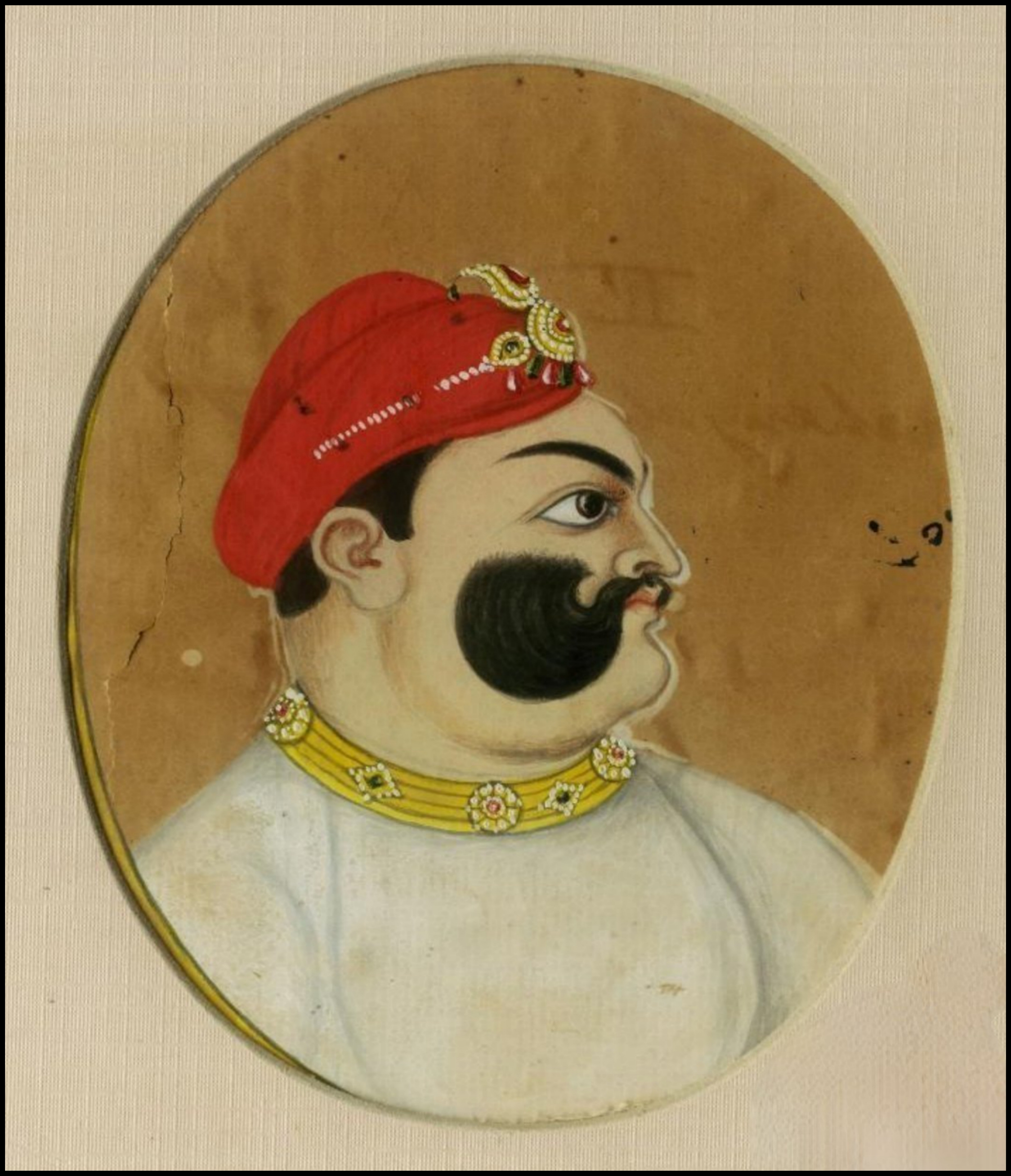
Portrait of Jawahar Singh

Toward the end of February 1757, the Afghan forces arrived in Mathura and sacked it. The city, despite being inhabited overwhelmingly by non-combatants, mainly pilgrims of the Hindu Holi festival, was attacked and the inhabitants were massacred by the Afghans. The Afghan forces slaughtered and defiled the bodies of Hindu ascetics by humiliating them with slaughtered cows. Temples of the city were razed, and the images of idols were destroyed. Jahan Khan furthered the massacre by rewarding a bounty of five rupees for every Hindu head, resulting in the death of thousands of men, women, and children. The Muslims of the city were subjected to the attack as well. Following his massacre at Mathura, Jahan Khan continued his campaign, with the city of Vrindavan being attacked and its inhabitants massacred on 6 March. The Tarikh-I-Husain Shahi establishes the idol destruction in line with iconoclasm, remarking: "Idols were broken and kicked about like polo-balls by the Islamic heroes."

Ahmad Shah, following Jahan Khan, attacked the city of Gokul on 16 March, which was inhabited by Naga Sadhus, a Hindu Bhakti sect. The Afghans attacked the city where a battle ensued, resulting in the death of 2,000 men for both sides. Jugal Kishor, a diplomat from the Bengal Subah, informed Ahmad Shah there was nothing of value in Gokul. Ahmad Shah ordered a withdrawal, sparing the city from sacking. On 21 March, Jahan Khan arrived before Agra with 15,000 men, besieging the city. Civilians from the town received Jahan Khan and his army, promising 500,000 rupees in tribute. However, after failing to raise the amount, Afghan forces entered the city, plundering it and massacring over 2,000. The Afghan forces attempted to seize Agra Fort but failed due to the defence of Mirza Saifullah, the garrison commander. He defended the fort with extensive artillery usage, preventing the Afghans from approaching with cannons. Jahan Khan seized 100,000 rupees in tribute, before withdrawing to Ahmad Shah's camp on 24 March after being recalled.

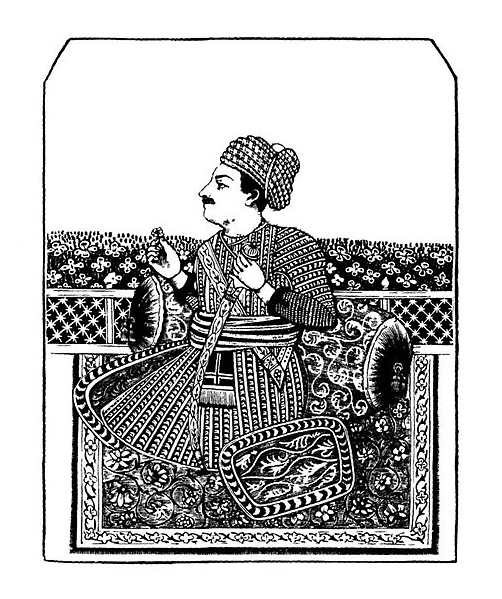
Illustration of Najib ud-Daula

Cholera had broken out in the Afghan camp, killing around 150 men per day, caused mainly by the polluted Yamuna River which was overwhelmed with bodies. As a result, Ahmad Shah intended to return to Afghanistan, especially to secure the loot from the campaign. The heat of the Indian summer also convinced him to return. Ahmad Shah started returning to Afghanistan in April 1757, declaring his son Timur Shah governor of Punjab, while Jahan Khan served as his deputy. Sirhind was annexed from the Mughals, Imad ul-Mulk was re-instated as vizier, and Najib ud-Daula appointed the Mir Bakhshi. Alamgir II was allowed to rule Delhi as a vassal of the Durrani Empire.

The Afghan invasion had dire consequences for the Mughal Empire, as most of the Mughal army, along with those from the Bengal Subah, were forcibly deployed against the Afghans. Mere months later, the army of the Bengal Subah, weakened due to the Afghan invasion, were utterly defeated at the Battle of Plassey, leading to the rise of British power in India.

The total loot Ahmad Shah carried back to Afghanistan is disputed. Contemporary writers estimate the Afghans seized 30 to 300 million rupees worth of goods. Over 28,000 elephants, camels, and mules carried Ahmad Shah's loot, alongside 80,000 soldiers, who carried whatever they had looted, with many of the Afghan cavalry returning on foot while they loaded the loot unto their horses. The massacres committed by the Afghans throughout the campaign made the Yamuna River flow red with blood for two weeks.

=== Durrani administration of the Punjab (1757–1758) ===
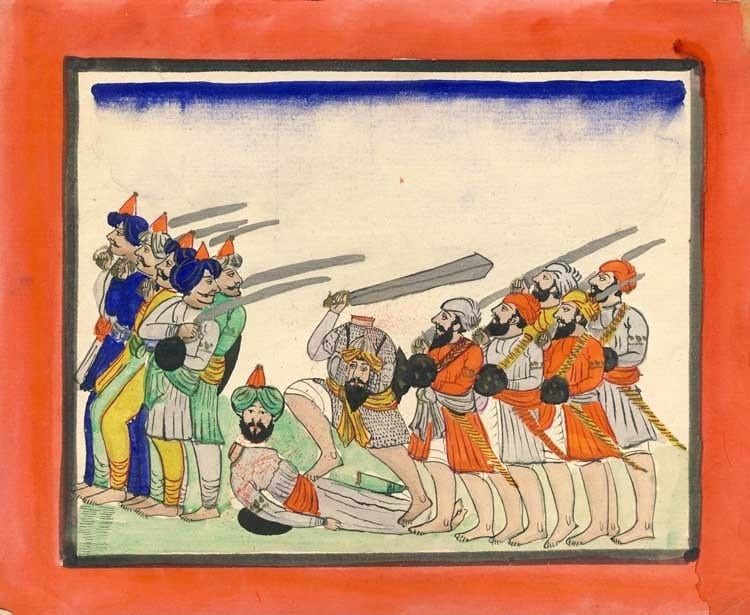
Depiction of the battle of Amritsar (1757) between the Sikhs and Afghans

Timur Shah was only eleven years old, and thus Punjab was governed mostly by Jahan Khan, who was noted as an experienced warrior but incapable administrator. He attacked the Sikhs who were celebrating the Diwali festival at Amritsar in 1757, and also destroyed and polluted many Sikh shrines, declaring Jihad. The tyrannies of Jahan Khan resulted in the Sikhs forging an alliance with Adina Beg, who had fled from Punjab during Ahmad Shah's fourth invasion. As a result, Jahan Khan led a campaign against Adina Beg in the Jalandhar Doab, pillaging the region. Adina Beg acquiesced to submitting tribute, but ignored summons to the Afghan court in Lahore. On one such occasion of being summoned, Adina Beg refused to trust Jahan Khan and fled to the Hill states, where he forged an alliance with Vadbhag Singh Sodhi and Jassa Singh Ahluwalia, the leader of the Dal Khalsa.

Jahan Khan dispatched a force under Murad Khan in response, who met the alliance at the battle of Mahilpur, where the Afghans were defeated, resulting in the looting of the Jalandhar Doab. More troops from Lahore were sent to quell the alliance but all of them were defeated, allowing the Sikhs to plunder the suburbs of Lahore.

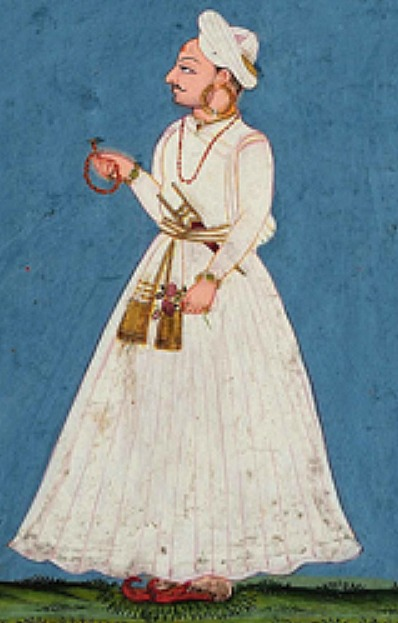
Painting of Raghunath Rao

A Maratha force led by Raghunath Rao arrived at Agra in May 1757 when Ahmad Shah was crossing the Indus River to Afghanistan. The Maratha forces completely seized the Ganges Doab, and defeated Najib ud-Daula at the battle of Delhi in September 1757. Alamgir II was retained on the throne as a puppet, and Imad ul-Mulk remained as vizier. Adina Beg requested the Marathas to invade Punjab, and Raghunath Rao accepted. The Maratha invasion began in February 1758, advancing and reaching Sirhind in March, which was besieged. Abdus Samad Khan, the Afghan governor of Sirhind, fled the city but was eventually captured, and Sirhind was plundered. The developments at Sirhind alerted Jahan Khan, who raised an army of 2,000 men and scouted far ahead of Lahore, but refused to give battle to the alliance. Upon receiving news of the Marathas approaching Lahore, he began preparing to return to Afghanistan on 19 April.

Encamping at Shahdara, the Afghans retreated across the Ravi, leaving Lahore in anarchy and free for capture by the alliance. Afghan rearguard contingents were ambushed by the Marathas, pushing Jahan Khan and Timur Shah to speed their progress to Afghanistan. Further close encounters at Eminabad saw the Afghans driven to the Chenab below Wazirabad, where they were attacked by the Marathas and Sikhs, who took some two hundred Afghan prisoners. Modern scholarship designates this encounter as the end of the Maratha pursuit. Near contemporary sources state the Marathas were able to establish themselves at Attock, and possibly even at Peshawar.

=== Kalat Rebellion (1758–1759) ===
With the Maratha conquest of Punjab, Nasir Khan, the ruler of the Khanate of Kalat, declared his independence from Ahmad Shah. Attempts to conciliate and have Nasir Khan return to Afghan suzerainty failed, prompting Ahmad Shah to dispatch a force under Shah Wali Khan, which was defeated at Pringuez, forcing their retreat to Quetta. Informed of the defeat, Ahmad Shah raised his own force and marched against Kalat in the summer of 1758. He met Nasir Khan in battle at Mastung, where the Kalat forces were defeated, prompting Nasir Khan's withdrawal to Kalat city, which Ahmad Shah then besieged. The siege of Kalat continued for forty days to no avail, and numerous storming attempts by the Afghans failed.

Nasir Khan, beleaguered of having been trapped in his capital, opened peace negotiations with the Afghans, apologizing for his rebellion. Ahmad Shah, having no intentions to annex Kalat or to bestow the province unto another governor, reaffirmed Nasir Khan in his position. A treaty was made, stipulating that Nasir Khan would re-enter and recognize the suzerainty of Ahmad Shah, but he would pay no tribute and furnish troops when called upon for war by the Shah. After the treaty, Ahmad Shah married a cousin of Nasir Khan. Months later, a dervish began a revolt by having an individual named Mir Khush Khan Durrani proclaimed king. This rebellion, however, was crushed with the dervish who instigated the revolt being executed, and Mir Khush Khan being blinded.

=== Fifth invasion of India (1759–1761) ===
Preoccupied with the uprising in Kalat, Ahmad Shah was unable to pursue a campaign against the Marathas, instead dispatching his generals, Jahan Khan and Nur ud-Din Bamizai, who were both defeated. In October 1759, Ahmad Shah began his fifth invasion of India. He had been invited by numerous rulers and religious leaders across India, including Shah Waliullah Dehlawi, who wrote to Ahmad Shah pleading for him to save the Muslims of India. Hari Ram Gupta considered the letter sent by Shah Waliullah as one of the most important historical documents of the 18th century. Ahmad Shah used this letter to get a jihad declared by religious leaders in Kandahar. Further invitations were sent by Najib ud-Daula, who wanted India to become a permanent extension of the Afghan empire. Alamgir II sent fervent requests to Ahmad Shah for aid, affirming his loyalty and informing him of the intentions of Imad ul-Mulk, who wished to assassinate him. Even Hindu rulers such as Madho Singh, the ruler of Amber, and Vijay Singh, the ruler of Marwar, were discontent with Maratha expansion and sent letters to Ahmad Shah. Ahmad Shah also wished to avenge the defeat of his son Timur Shah, and to reclaim the lost territories of Punjab.

Ahmad Shah split his forces to attack from two sides. Jahan Khan advanced from Kandahar to Kabul, and then through the Khyber Pass with an army of 20,000; while Ahmad Shah led a force of 40,000 through the Bolan Pass. He was further reinforced by Nasir Khan and other Afghan chiefs, eventually fording the Indus on 25 October 1759. When Ahmad Shah entered the Punjab, Jahan Khan had forced the Maratha forces stationed at Attock to evacuate, pursuing them and battling at Rohtas, where the Maratha army was routed, forcing their withdrawal to Delhi.

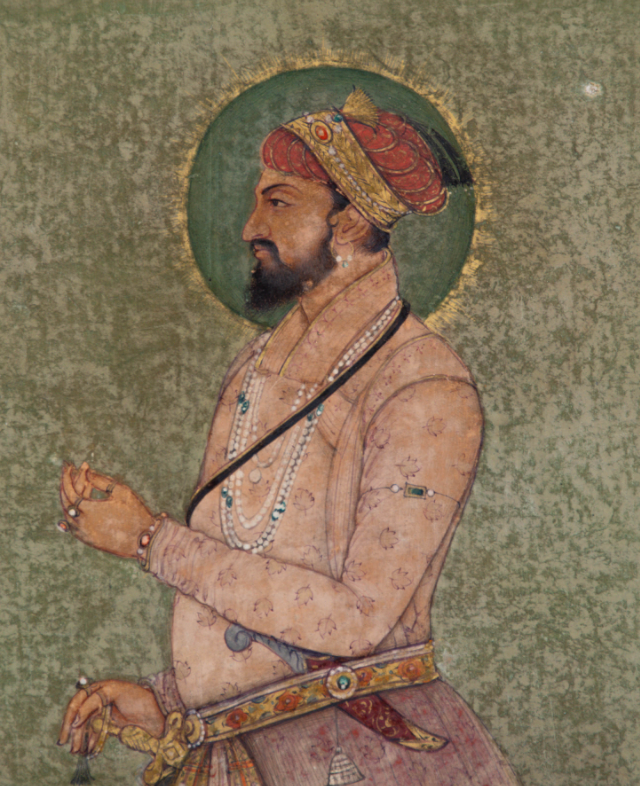
Portrait of Shah Jahan III, who was placed on the Mughal throne after Imad ul-Mulk had Alamgir II assassinated

At this time, Ahmad Shah approached Multan with his army. The Maratha governor in response fled to Lahore, leaving the city to be captured without resistance. With the Afghans converging on Lahore, the Maratha forces withdrew to Batala and then Sirhind, with some Maratha detachments being caught and destroyed. At Lahore, Jahan Khan battled with the Sikhs. No clear victor emerged, and the Afghans suffered some 2,000 dead, while Jahan Khan was wounded during the battle. The approach of Ahmad Shah Durrani caused havoc throughout all of Northern India, causing Imad ul-Mulk to have Alamgir II and Intizam-ud-Daulah murdered as a result, placing Shah Jahan III on the Mughal throne. Ahmad Shah continued advancing through Punjab and Jahan Khan seized Sirhind on 27 November, with both armies uniting at Sirhind in December 1759.

Enraged by the execution of Alamgir II, Ahmad Shah began racing toward Delhi. He reached Ambala on 20 December and advanced towards Taraori, leading to a battle against the Marathas led by Dattaji Scindia. The advance guard of the Afghan army clashed with the Marathas and was initially routed, initiating a withdrawal. However, Ahmad Shah, ready to support the battle, dispatched 5,000 men under Shah Pasand Khan. The forces of Imad ul-Mulk in the battle completely fled at the sight of Shah Pasand's flag, and the Afghans attacked with muskets. Further detachments of the Afghan army sent by Ahmad Shah brought the battle to an end, with the Maratha force completely surrounded and destroyed.

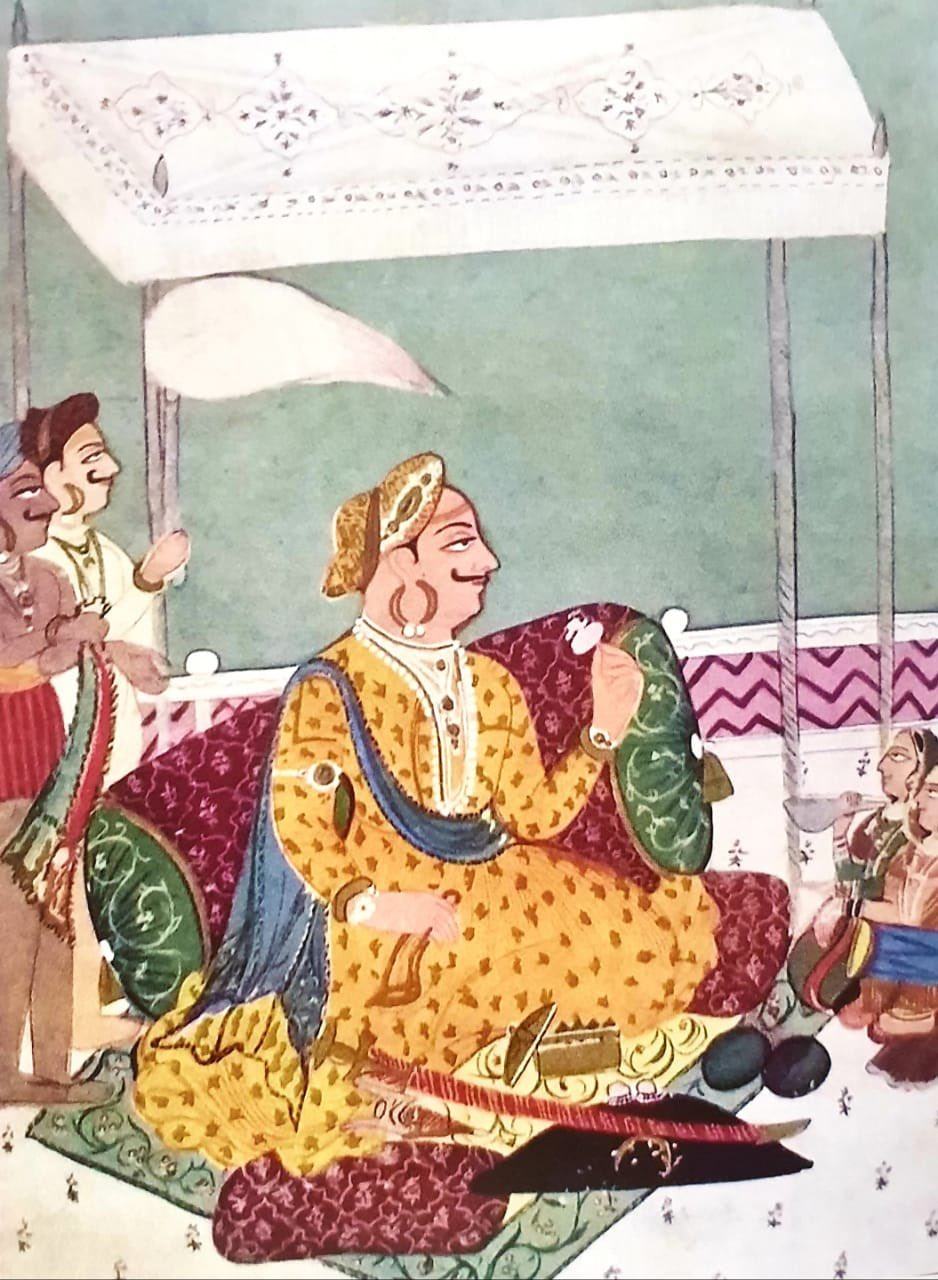
Dattaji Scindia, the Maratha commander in Northern India

Following the battle, Ahmad Shah forded the Yamuna and united with the forces of Najib ud-Daula and other Rohilla leaders at Saharanpur. The combined armies marched toward Delhi, encamping at Luni, around 10 km (6.2 mi) from the Red Fort in Delhi on the other side of the Yamuna. Dattaji Scindia returned to Kunjpura following his defeat at Taraori, and prepared to defend Delhi from the Afghan army. He first sent Imad ul-Mulk to set up the defences of the city. However, Imad ul-Mulk deserted the Marathas and fled to Suraj Mal.

Dattaji then advanced to Sonipat, attempting to track Ahmad Shah's movements, which was made difficult as the Afghans kept their movements confidential by killing every Indian found outside their houses. Dattaji established camp at Barari on 4 January 1760. On 9 January, Najib ud-Daula began crossing the Yamuna with Ahmad Shah following him, leading to the battle of Barari Ghat. The Maratha forces opposed the advance of the Afghans across the river but were overpowered by musketeers, with much of the Maratha army only armed with spears and swords. Dattaji, attempting to enter the fray himself, was shot either in the eye, or the ribs, causing his death. Further Maratha reinforcements were useless against the Afghan musket fire, forcing the Marathas to withdraw from the field with a thousand dead, and the Afghans victorious.

Having defeated the Marathas at Barari Ghat, Ahmad Shah entered Delhi, with his men plundering the city. Much of the population of the city had already fled, and he took Shah Jahan III under his protection instead of claiming the Mughal throne for himself. Ahmad Shah also deputed Yaqub Ali Khan as governor of the city, who was a nephew of his vizier, Shah Wali Khan, before leaving to march against Suraj Mal. Leaving Delhi on 27 January, Ahmad Shah besieged Deeg on 7 February, although not committing to the siege seriously. During the siege, he sent a detachment under Jahan Khan which routed a Maratha army on 11 February at Rewari. Ahmad Shah then pursued a Maratha force led by Malhar Rao Holkar stationed at Narnaul. After reaching Rewari, Ahmad Shah was evaded by Holkar, and the Maratha force crossed the Yamuna river on 26–27 February, entering Najib ud-Daula's territories. On 28 February, Holkar advanced to Sikandrabad, awaiting news of the Afghan position. On 1 March 1760, Ahmad Shah dispatched a force of 15,000 under Jahan Khan, Shah Pasand Khan, and Qalandar Khan to halt the Maratha army. The Marathas were caught on 4 March and completely routed at the battle of Sikandarabad, with many Maratha officers slain. Holkar himself fled for his life to Agra, and then to Bharatpur to meet Suraj Mal.

With another victory over the Marathas, Ahmad Shah proceeded to Aligarh, which belonged to the Jats, and besieged it. Unable to receive any reinforcements, the fort surrendered to the Afghans. At Aligarh, Najib ud-Daula advised Ahmad Shah to rest and wait out for the summer and monsoon seasons to pass, especially as the summer had been so catastrophic for the Afghans during the fourth invasion of India. Najib ud-Daula then expelled the Marathas from Shikohabad, Phaphund, and Bithoor.

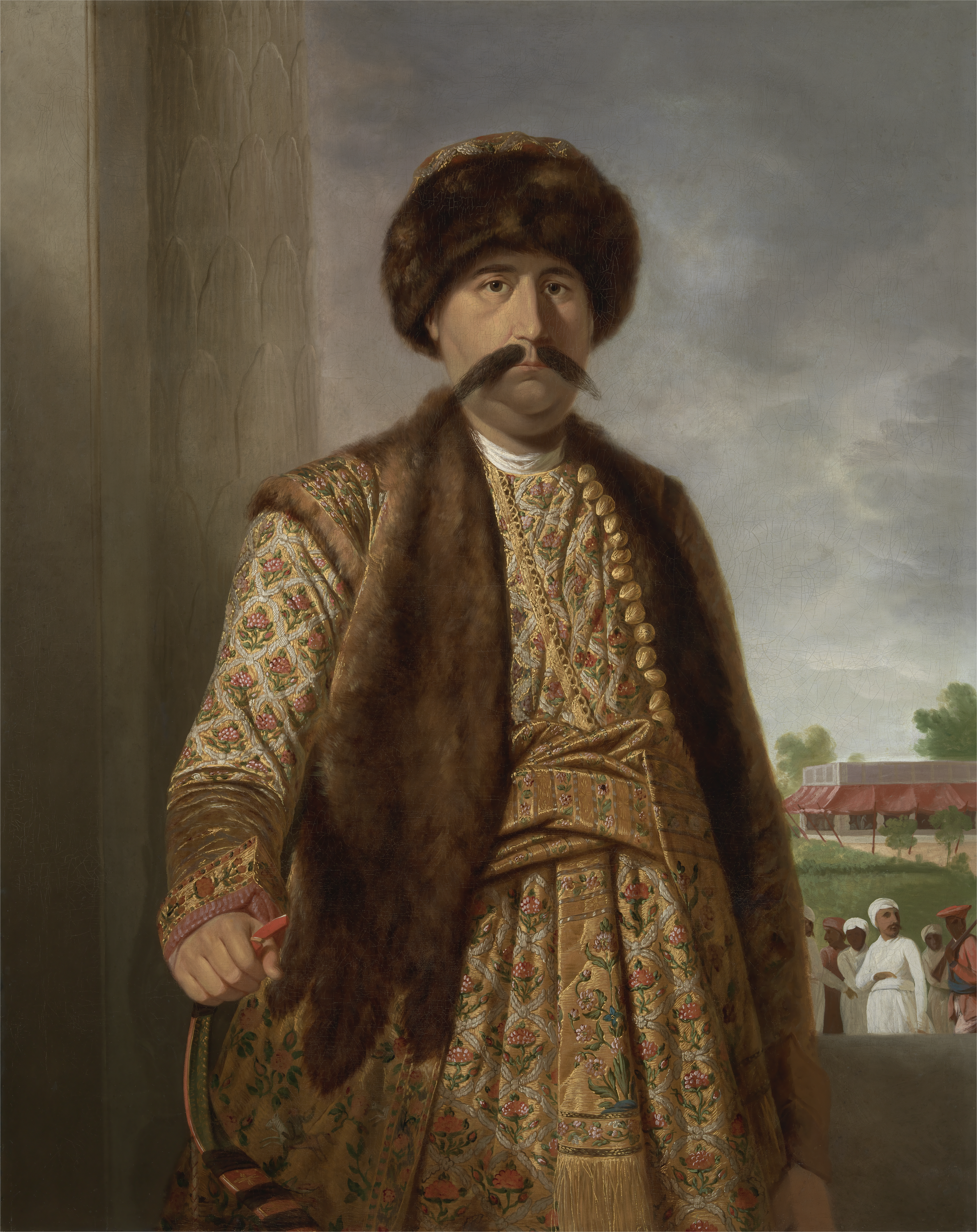
Shuja-ud-Daula, a vital Durrani ally during Ahmad Shah's fifth invasion

As the Afghans settled in, they resorted to diplomacy to strengthen their position. Ahmad Khan Bangash, although an initial Maratha ally, was appealed to by Shah Wali Khan as an Afghan brother. Ahmad Khan thus allied with the Durranis and arrived at their camp on 13 April 1760. The Afghans also successfully negotiated with the ruler of Oudh, Shuja ud-Daula, who allied with the Durrani camp in July 1760. Ahmad Shah also had friendly relations with the Rajputs, even declaring to them his intention to invade the Deccan in the winter. At this time, the Marathas sent reinforcements under Sadashivrao Bhau, a cousin of the Peshwa, Balaji Baji Rao. The reinforcements also included Vishwasrao, the heir of the Maratha Confederacy, and nearly all significant Maratha commanders. Sadashivrao was described as an ignorant commander with a short temper and pride, ignoring the advice of more senior commanders who had experience in Northern India, and failing to anticipate certain outcomes.

The Maratha force reached Agra on 14 July. Sadashivrao, finding the Yamuna river overflowing, settled on advancing to Delhi. The Marathas advanced from Mathura and reached Delhi on 23 July, where it was stormed. The city fell to the Marathas, but the Red Fort held out. On 29 July, negotiations for the garrison's withdrawal culminated. Yaqub Ali Khan was allowed to leave the city to Ahmad Shah's camp with his men unharmed, and Maratha forces occupied the Red Fort on 1 August. The Marathas began facing difficulties on 4 August, when Suraj Mal and Imad ul-Mulk defected from the Marathas and returned to their posts. Furthermore, the Maratha army lacked food and feed for their horses. The situation became so difficult that Sadashivrao wrote there was no money to pay for food and the men of the army and the horses were fasting. Peace negotiations between Ahmad Shah and the Marathas also failed, with both parties seeking their own extensive demands.

By the end of September 1760, the Maratha camp was overridden with starvation. Ahmad Shah, however, was anxious to return to Afghanistan since his settling at Aligarh, as he never intended to form an Afghan empire based in India. The Marathas left Delhi on 10 October, and Ahmad Shah responded by having his army arrayed across the Yamuna. Sadashivrao, intending to seize Kunjpura, which had vast supplies, arrived before the city on 16 October. The battle of Kunjpura ensued which saw the Marathas victorious and the Afghan governor at Kunjpura, Najabat Khan, and Abdus Samad Khan killed. Ahmad Shah was unable to help the defenders of Delhi and Kunjpura as he was stuck on the other side of the Yamuna.

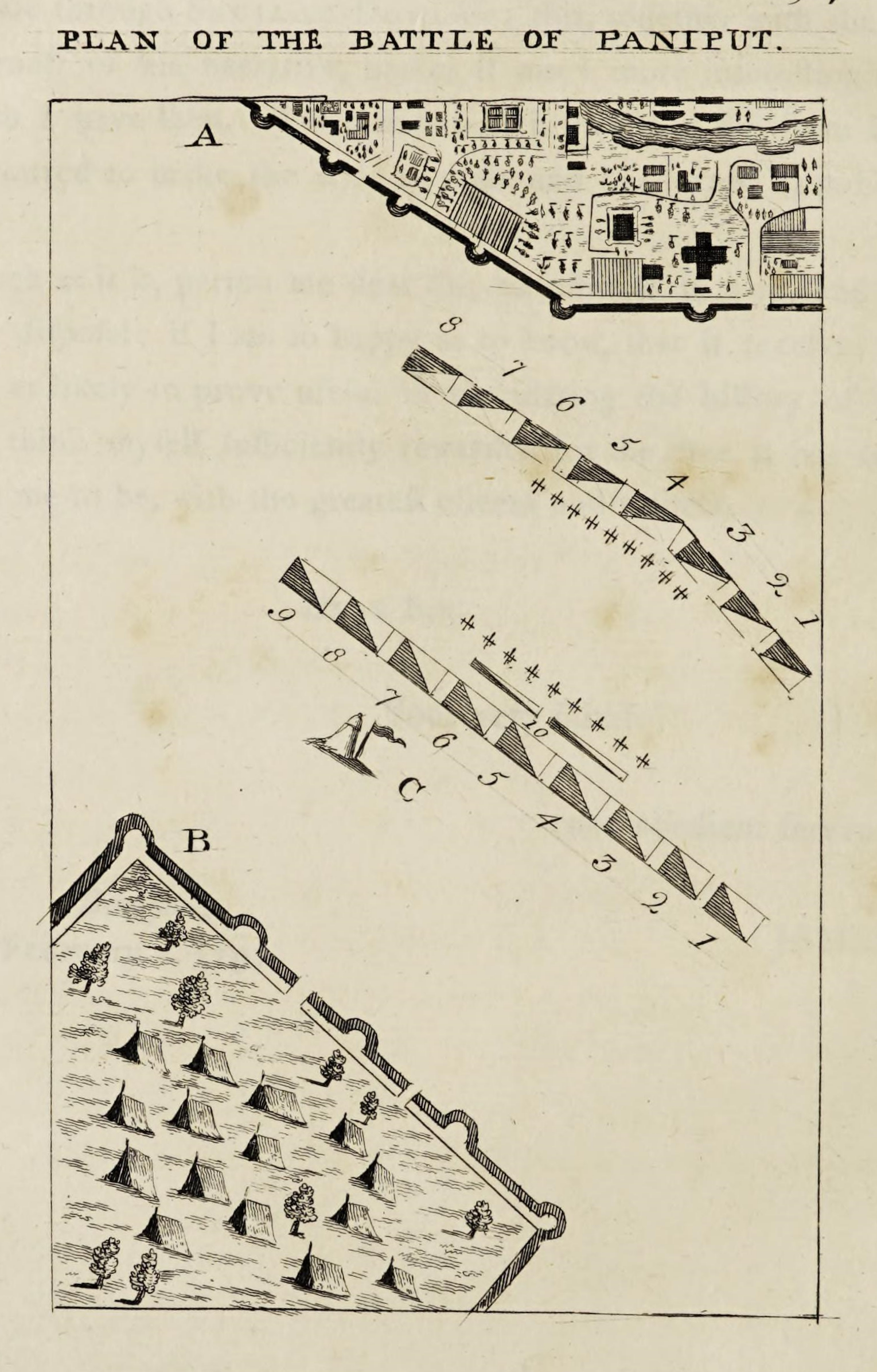
Afghan and Maratha camps detailed by a plan of the third battle of Panipat

Ahmad Shah, infuriated at the fall of Kunjpura, began preparing for a crossing over the flooded and practically unfordable Yamuna river at Baghpat. The Afghan forces crossed between 25 and 26 October, massacring a Maratha detachment near Sonipat. Another battle at Samalkha saw the Marathas forced back to their camp at Panipat. On 30 October, Ahmad Shah reached Sambhalka, and arrayed before the Marathas on 1 November. Najib ud-Daula was dispatched by Ahmad Shah to prevent Maratha supplies flowing in from Delhi, defeating the forces of Naro Shankar, the Maratha governor of Delhi. Sadashivrao in response sent Govind Pant Bundela to invade Rohilla territories and cut off Afghan supplies. Marching with 12,000 horsemen, the Maratha detachment advanced up to Meerut before being attacked by an Afghan contingent of 14,000 dispatched by Ahmad Shah on 17 December under Atai Khan. Govind Pant was killed and the Maratha force was routed, with large amounts of supplies being seized by the Afghans.

The Marathas were cut off from all supplies as a result, and a last desperate attempt for peace was sent by Sadashivrao, even agreeing on any term Ahmad Shah deemed fit. Najib ud-Daula shut down the idea and Ahmad Shah rejected peace. As starvation gripped the Maratha camp, Sadashivrao concluded with his cabinet of war on 13 January to attack the Afghans. On 14 January, the Maratha forces assembled and began marching on the Afghan camp. The numbers of the battle vary by source. Historian JL Mehta states the Afghans had 79,800 men, while the mustered Marathas 85,000. The Afghans had a gradual flow of manpower into the army while the Marathas did not, ensuring the Marathas were far outnumbered during the battle.

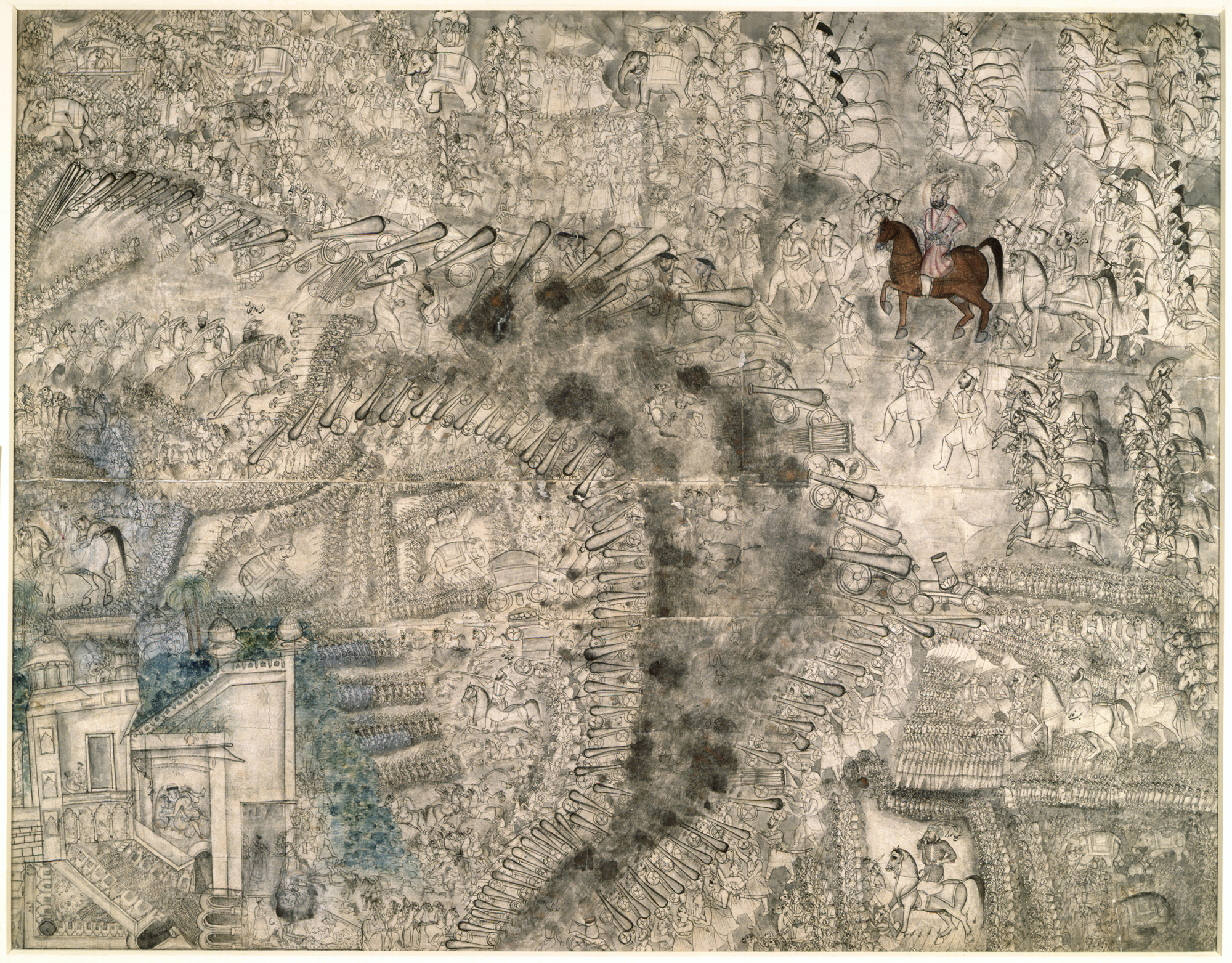
Painting of the Third Battle of Panipat in Northern India

The third battle of Panipat ensued and Ibrahim Khan Gardi unleashed his cannons on the Afghans. However, the troops operating the cannons were completely inexperienced and their artillery fire merely flew overhead the Afghan army. Ibrahim Khan, realizing his failure in this regard, held his cannon fire and instead engaged with a detachment of his troops against the Rohilla units of Ahmad Shah's army. Other Maratha officers attempted to engage as well with Ibrahim Khan's forces. The Rohillas responded with musket fire and the Marathas were beaten back with heavy casualties. Ibrahim Khan's forces were devastated by Rohilla cavalry, resulting in the losses of over six battalions and Ibrahim Khan himself being wounded, with the Maratha left wing failing.

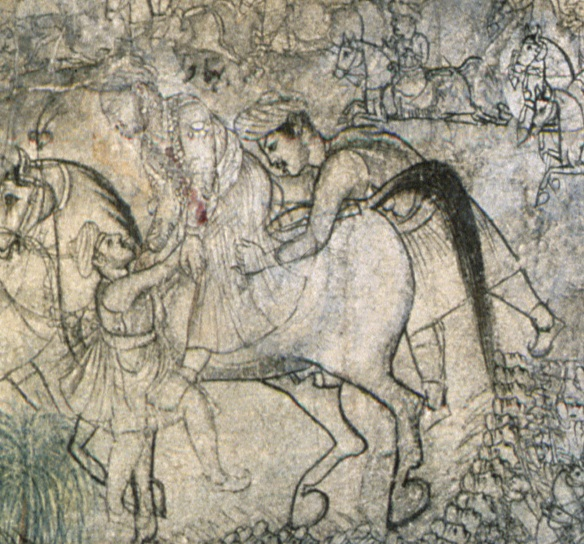
Painting of a wounded Sadashivrao being carried away on horseback during the Third battle of Panipat

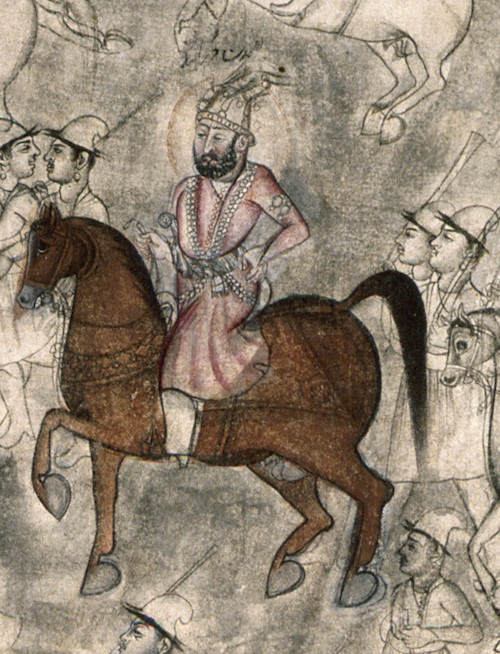
Ahmad Shah Durrani depicted on horseback during the Third battle of Panipat

Sadashivrao led an attack on the Afghan centre simultaneously, with both sides having equal numbers. Despite the Rohilla victory on the left wing, the Afghan centre was exposed, and the Marathas breached over three lines in the Afghan centre, with around 3,000 Afghans dead or wounded. At a pivotal moment, Ahmad Shah sent his reinforcements of 4,000 Qizilbash to the right wing and 10,000 men to the Afghan centre. Ahmad Shah also dispatched his zamburaks, inflicting heavy casualties on the Marathas. A counter-attack was launched by the Afghans across all fronts.

Vishwasrao was then killed by a bullet, with news of his death spreading through the Maratha camp and leading to the desertion of over 2,000 Afghans and Rohillas serving the Marathas. The Maratha left wing was thus dismantled and routed. As the Rohillas launched their own attack, Malhar Rao Holkar fled the battle. The Afghan left wing caved in on the Maratha centre, while the Maratha right wing was completely annihilated by Najib ud-Daula. Ahmad Shah then advanced to the centre to command the final stage of the battle.

Sadashivrao attempted to assault the Afghan centre twice but was pushed back with heavy losses. Ahmad Shah then ordered 8,000 reinforcements from his own tribe to attack, and Sadashivrao was killed during the fray. The death of Sadashivrao saw all Maratha resistance dissipate and the Maratha centre was slaughtered. The Marathas who tried to escape the battlefield were chased. A minimum of 75,000 Marathas are estimated to have been killed, the maximum number being 100,000. This included over 30,000 Marathas perishing in battle, another 10,000 being killed while retreating, and another 10,000 reported missing. After the battle, 50,000 Maratha camp followers were massacred or sold into slavery.

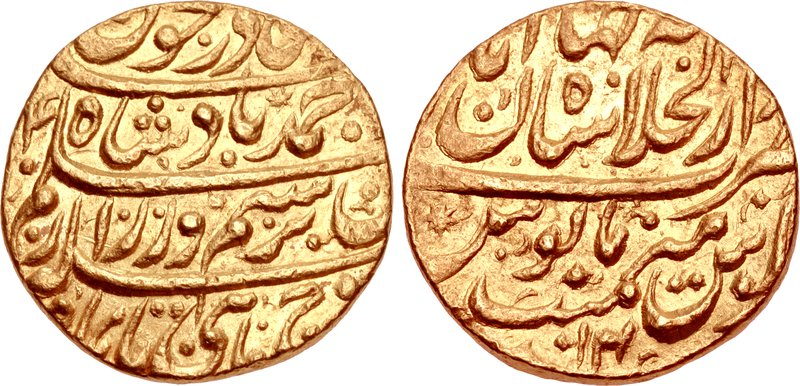
Coin of Ahmad Shah Durrani, struck in Delhi

The loss at Panipat resulted in the end of Maratha influence in Northern India. The day after the battle, Ahmad Shah entered the city of Panipat wearing jewels such as the Koh-i-Noor. The Afghan troops massacred any male over the age of fourteen and enslaved the woman and children of the city. Ahmad Shah made a pilgrimage to the tomb of Bu Ali Shah Qalandar, and then left Panipat on 19 July to enter Delhi. He formally entered the Red Fort on 29 January, with the khutbah being read in his name and coins being struck. After resting for two months, Ahmad Shah's troops demanded to return to Afghanistan, as much of them had been unpaid for over a year and a half. As a result, after plundering Delhi, he began returning to Afghanistan on 20–22 March.

Ahmad Shah settled the affairs of India by placing Shah Alam II on the Mughal throne with Najib ud-Daula as his Bakhshi, and Jawan Bakht being recognized as the heir to Shah Alam. Delhi was given to Najib ud-Daula and Jawan Bakht to rule together, while Imad ul-Mulk was permitted to serve as vizier again. No peace deal was made with the Marathas as Peshwa Balaji Baji Rao died soon after the loss at Panipat. While returning to Afghanistan, the Afghan army was attacked by the Sikhs under Jassa Singh Ahluwalia, who carried away stragglers. The Sikhs attacked the Afghan flanks at night but maintained distance to avoid the Afghan artillery and cavalry, and avoided pitched battle. A surprise attack on the Beas river by the Sikhs freed many Maratha prisoners. In response, Ahmad Shah established defences around his camp every night, and at Lahore, he sent numerous expeditions against the Sikhs that captured and killed many. He completed his return to Afghanistan by May 1761.

=== Rebellions in Afghanistan (1760–1762) ===
While Ahmad Shah campaigned, numerous incidents had occurred throughout Afghanistan. When the Marathas occupied Delhi, an uprising began under Hajji Jamal Khan Zargarani based on reports of Ahmad Shah's death, and he proclaimed himself king of Afghanistan. At Kandahar he struck coins in his name. However, as news of Ahmad Shah's victories trickled in from India, he renounced his claim and fled for his life to a remote area of the country. Another revolt had begun under Darwish Ali Khan Hazara, who avoided Shah Pasand's forces, before eventually being allowed to return to Herat between 1761 and 1762. In early 1761, Abd al-Khaliq Khan, Dilawar Khan Ishaqzai and Zal Beg Popalzai, who were members of Ahmad Shah's tribal council, rebelled. They first went to the fortress of Grishk, falsely claiming Ahmad Shah had been defeated in India, and declared Abd al-Khaliq as king. The combined forces from Griskh marched to Kandahar, making Ahmad Shah's son Sulaiman Mirza abandon the capital.

Shah Pasand Khan was dispatched to crush the revolt, and he arrived before the city, clarifying Ahmad Shah was alive. The rebellion's support thus dissipated, and the leaders of the rebellion went to Shah Pasand's camp for mercy. Insignificant rebels were spared, while Zal Beg Popalzai and other significant leaders were executed. Dilawar Khan fled to Herat where Timur Shah Durrani allowed him to become the commander of his personal bodyguard, and Abd al-Khaliq was imprisoned.

=== Sixth invasion of India (1762) ===
As Ahmad Shah retired to Afghanistan from his fifth invasion of India, the Sikhs defeated many of his governors, primarily during a decisive battle at Gujranwala which led to the fall of Lahore in November 1761. Enraged at the defeat of his deputies, Ahmad Shah prepared for his sixth invasion of India, initiating it in February 1762. With a light cavalry force, he dashed through Punjab in a rapid march, crossing over 200 kilometres and fording two rivers in 36 hours. News of this reached the Sikhs who were engaged in a siege at Jandiala. The Sikhs raised the siege and withdrew, until their position was compromised by the Afghan governor of Malerkotla. Ahmad Shah led his forces along with those of Zain Khan Sirhindi, catching the Sikhs at the village of Kup. The Sikhs under Jassa Singh and Charat Singh were completely defeated and massacred in an event known as the Vadda Ghalughara. Ahmad Shah ordered that nobody wearing Indian clothes was to be left alive, and thus camp followers including women and children were killed. After the battle of Kup, Ahmad Shah invaded Patiala State, ruled by Ala Singh. Ahmad Shah stormed the fortress of Barnala, before Ala Singh produced himself before the Shah, submitting tribute. Ahmad Shah then returned to Lahore on 3 March after camping at Sirhind.

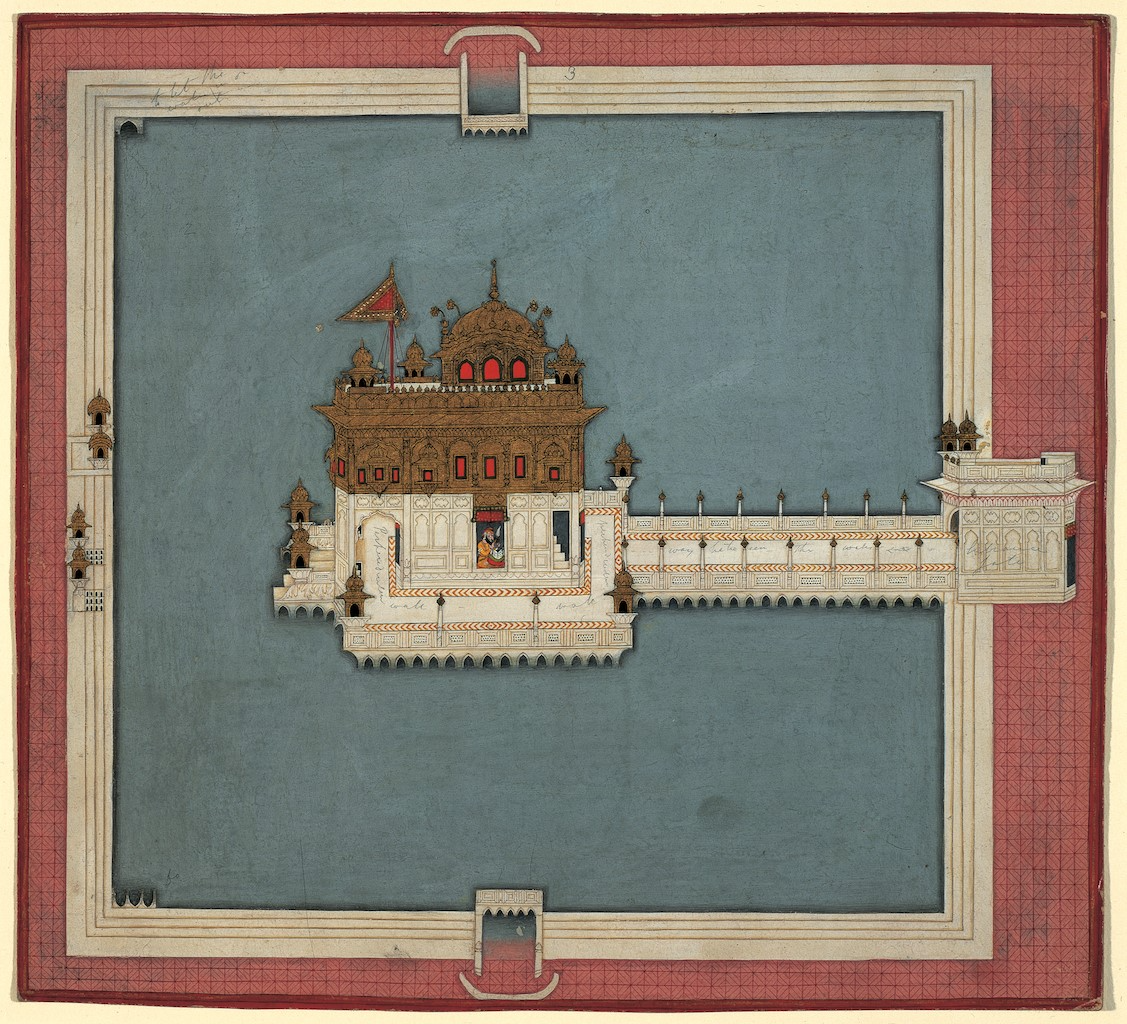
Depiction of Harmandir Sahib (now commonly known as the Golden Temple). Afghan forces razed it and polluted the lake.

At Lahore, he assembled his forces and attacked Amritsar, arriving at the city on 10 April, a day before the Vaisakhi festival. The city was sacked and a massacre ensued where Harmandir Sahib was razed, blown with gunpowder and the blood of men and cows polluted the lake surrounding it. At this time, a piece of shrapnel hit Ahmad Shah on the nose, causing an open wound that would plague him for the rest of his life. Ahmad Shah then rested at Lahore, intending to settle the affairs of India. He sent an expedition toward Kashmir which had declared its independence under Sukh Jiwan Mal, and Kashmir was re-conquered. Peace negotiations began with the Marathas, while Ahmad Shah called upon Indian princes to recognize Shah Alam II as the Mughal emperor.

Between April–May 1762, Zain Khan was defeated by the Sikhs at Harnaulgarh. During the summer, Ahmad Shah moved his camp to Kalanaur. The Sikhs capitalized off of this, with Jassa Singh and Tara Singh invading the Jalandhar Doab, while Charat Singh plundered the regions north of Lahore. In October 1762, Ahmad Shah possibly fought a battle at Amritsar, an event not accepted by all historians. The possible battle was fought under a complete solar eclipse that raged until the night, where Ahmad Shah withdrew to Lahore before returning to see the Sikhs had also withdrawn. Afterward, Ahmad Shah appointed a Hindu, Kabuli Mal, as the Durrani governor of Punjab, believing it would bring stability. Ahmad Shah began withdrawing to Afghanistan on 12 December after news of an uprising in Kandahar arrived. While returning, he routed a Sikh army on the banks of the Ravi river. His health was significantly affected during the invasion as a result of the summer heat, further worsened by his wounded nose.

=== Encounters with the Qing (1763–1764, 1768–1769) ===
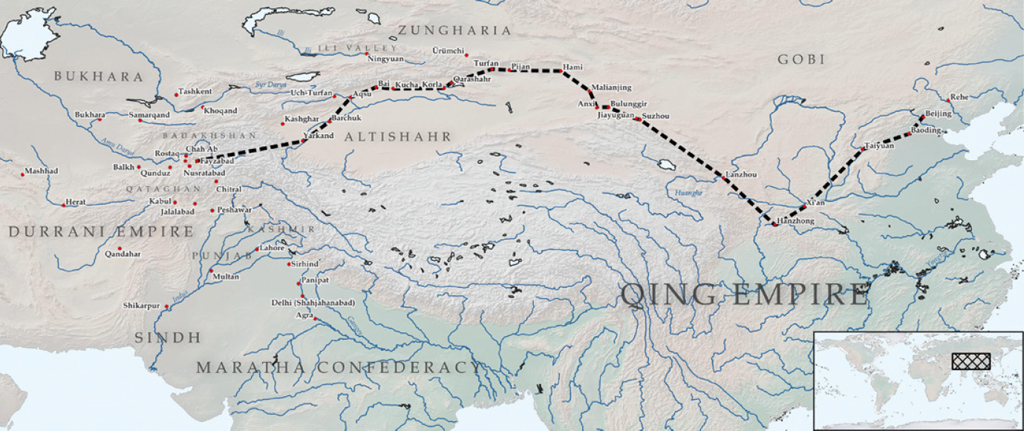
Map of the route the Afghan embassy undertook to the Qing dynasty in 1763

Numerous Central Asian rulers such as Fazil Biy, the ruler of Khujand, Irdana Biy, the ruler of Kokand, and even a Kazakh Sultan pleaded to Ahmad Shah Durrani, the ruler of the Durrani Empire, to aid them against Qing expansionism. Ahmad Shah accepted the call for aid, and began preparing by occupying the regions between Tashkent and Kokand in 1763, though later withdrawing as it became clear the Qing did not intend to invade. Later emissaries from the Russian Empire also attempted to encourage the Afghans to commit to an anti-Qing campaign, but withdrew after arriving at Herat upon learning Ahmad Shah was committed to a campaign in India in 1764 with no clear intention of advancing north.

In 1763, Ahmad Shah had dispatched an embassy to the Qing. His aims are unknown, however, an embassy allowed Ahmad Shah to establish himself as an emperor. The letter he sent to the Qing emperor Qianlong is missing, but based on the Qing reply, the letter was likely dedicated to his conquests, victory at Panipat, and Qing expansion. The letter positioned Ahmad Shah's expansions as bringing order and stability to areas overrun with rebels and lawlessness, referring to his campaigns in Iran and India. The battle of Panipat was strongly detailed in the letter, in what was likely a fath-nama, meaning a victory letter or declaration to celebrate a victory. The Qing emperor ignored the implied threat.

In the second part of the letter, Qianlong appeared much more defensive, justifying the Qing conquest of the Dzungars and the Altishahr Khojas. He accused them of causing devastation and laying false accusations against him. A report also suggests Ahmad Shah considered the territories the Qing claimed actually belonged to the Muslims. In reality, Ahmad Shah possibly wanted to establish spheres of influence, which was similarly done with the Ottomans who had divided Iran between them, and a treaty with Bukhara that had established the Amu Darya as the border.

Why has your Khan dispatched you? Has your Khan not sent you to appear at an audience with the brilliance of our Great Lord? Our Great Lord is the ruler who has united All under Heaven. Besides you Afghans, as soon as people from the West, Russia, even the former Zunghars came, all of them promptly prostrated themselves before the Great Lord. He is like Heaven; do you not bow before Heaven?

— A Qing grand councillor, remarking at the Afghan envoy's refusal to Kowtow

When the Afghan embassy arrived in Beijing, the chief envoy, Khwaja Mirhan, refused to kowtow before the Qing emperor. The Qing officials, in shock, demanded he kowtow, to which Mirhan eventually acquiesced. This incident damaged the Qing-Afghan relations and Qianlong cut ties with the Afghans following this. No immediate consequence occurred, and the envoy was shown favour. Mirhan's refusal likely came out of religious reasons, but the Qing received it as Ahmad Shah declaring himself equal to Qianlong. From Qianlong's view, he saw the Afghans as a significant power and attempted to impress the envoy and Ahmad Shah by the Qing empire. This was especially done due to the recent conquest of Altishahr and concerns over stability in the region.

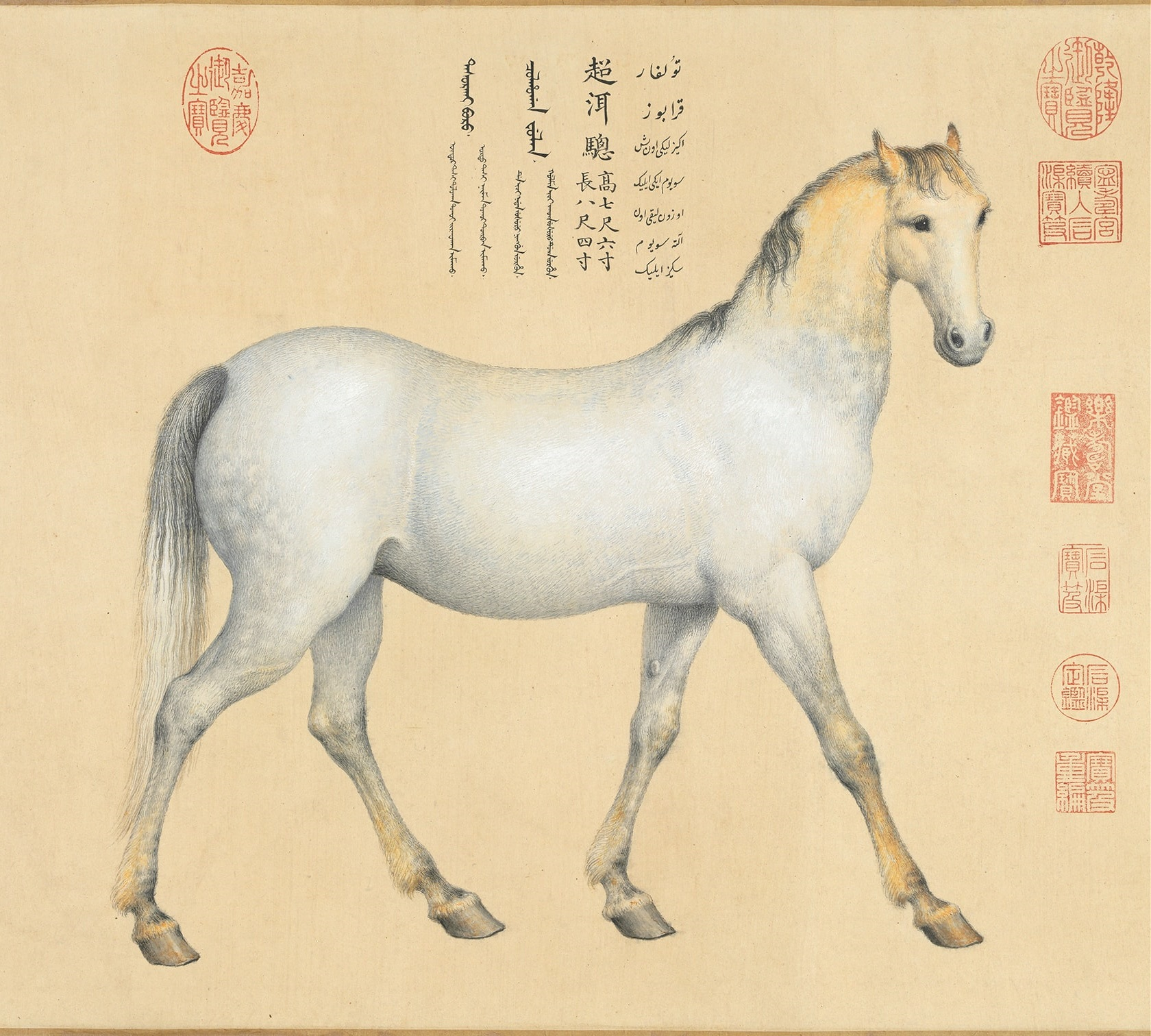
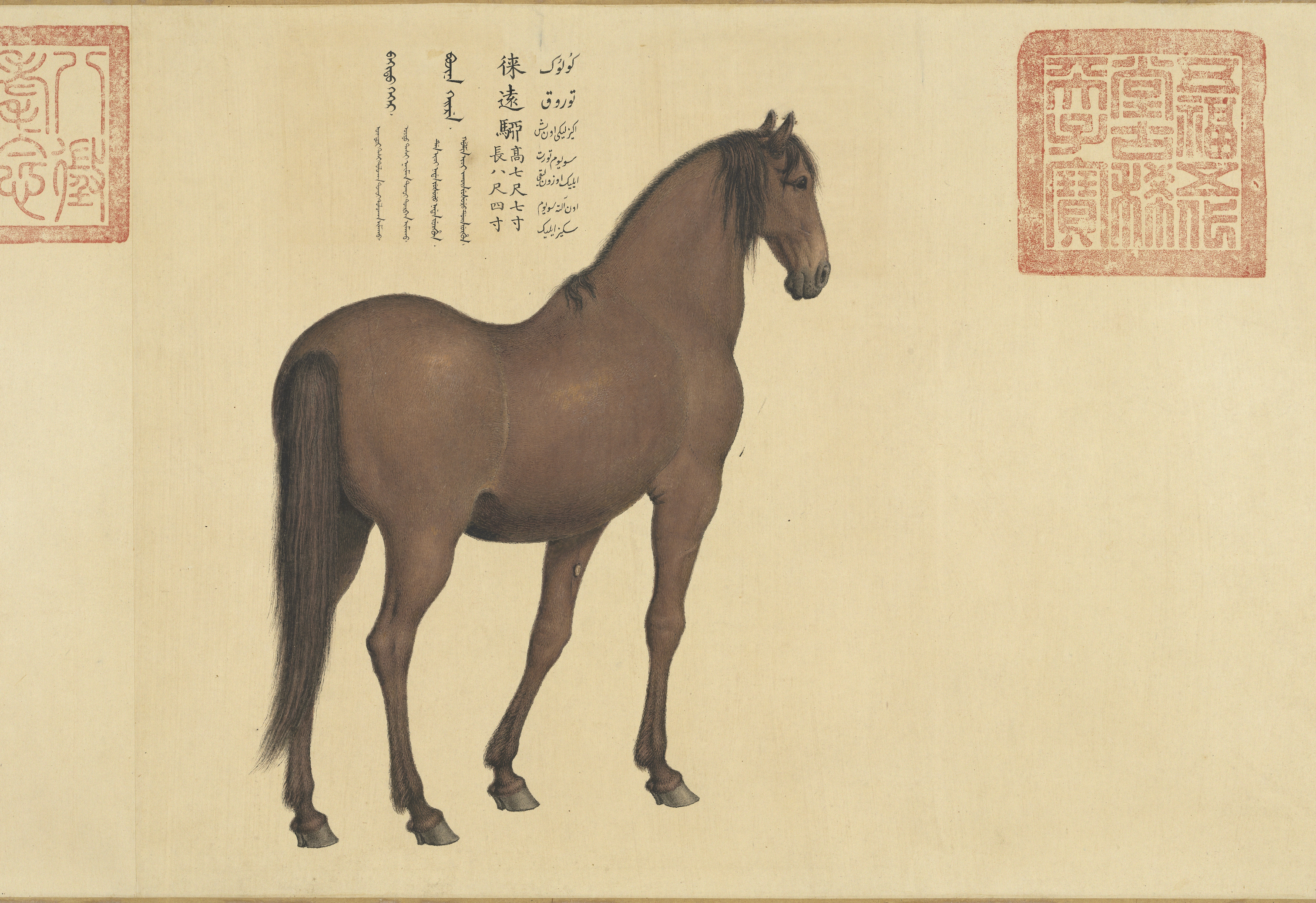
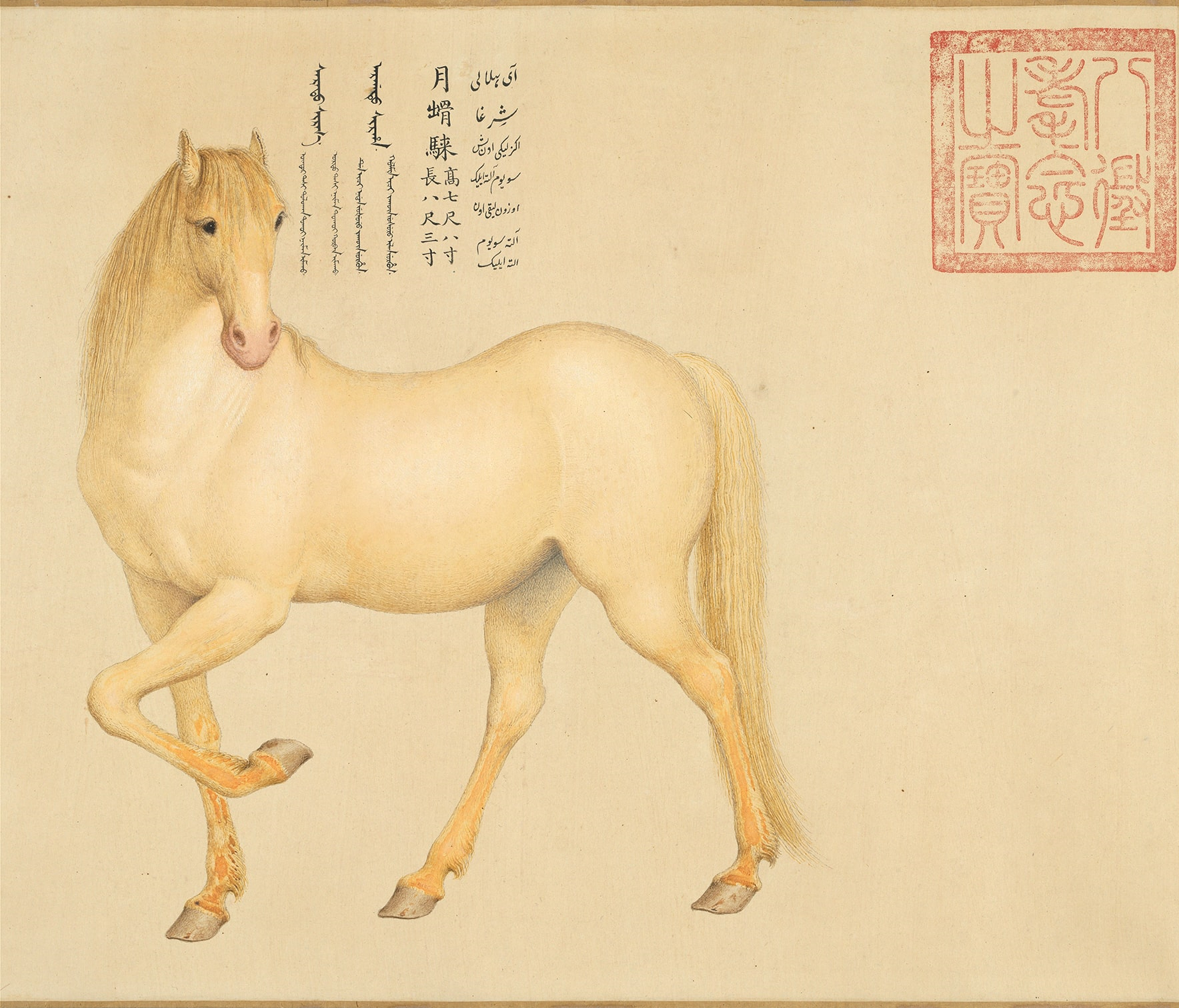
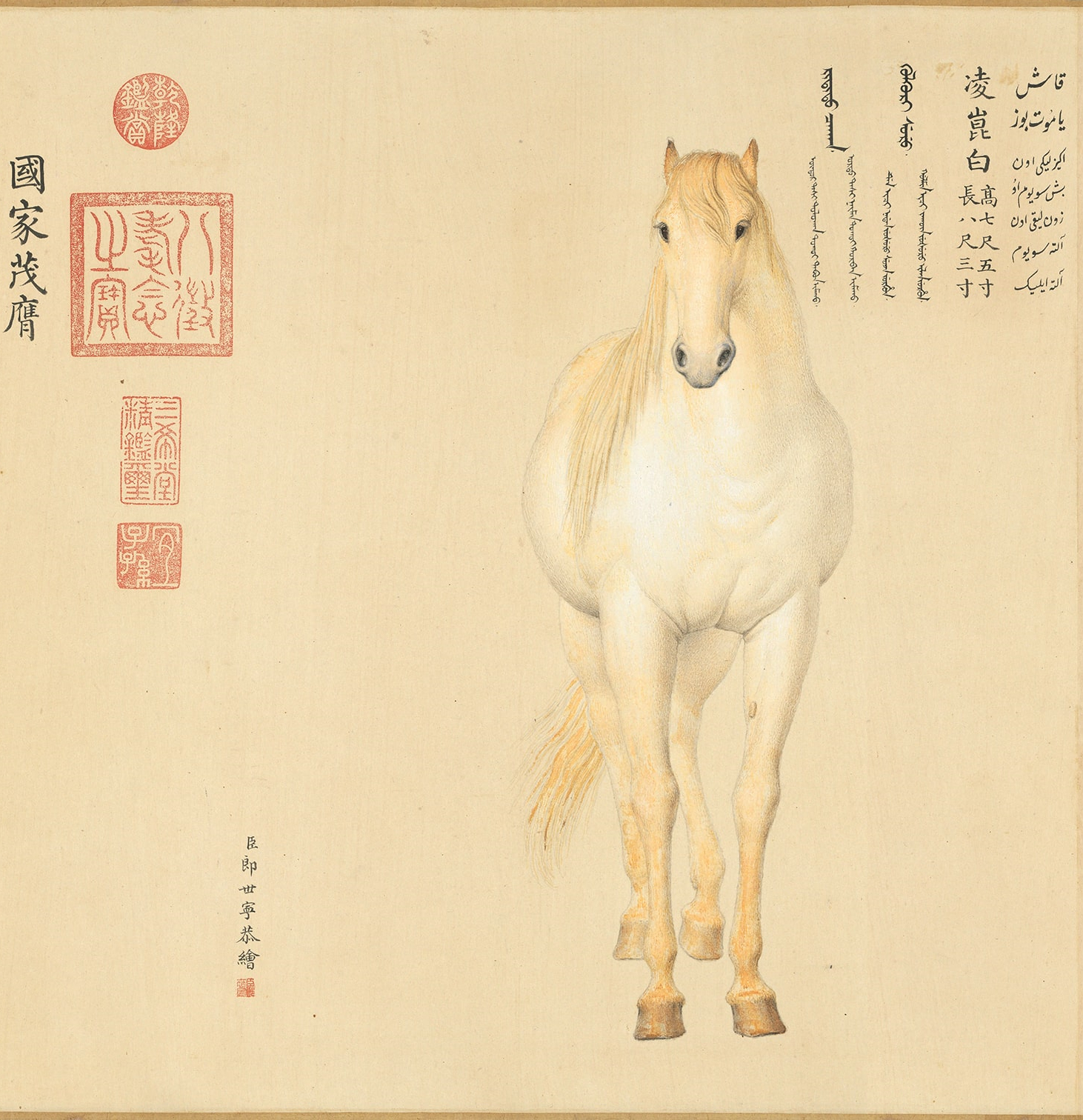
Depiction of the four Afghan horses sent by Ahmad Shah, painted by Qing court painter Giuseppe Castiglione

Ahmad Shah's gifts to the Qing emperor included four horses, which were painted by the Qing court painter Giuseppe Castiglione. Nonetheless, by the time of the envoy's return journey to Afghanistan, Qianlong made preparations to secure Qing territories. In 1759, as the revolt of the Altishahr Khojas crumbled, two descendants of the Afaqi Sufi lineage crossed into Badakhshan after being pursued by Qing forces. Fude, the Qing general of the expedition, demanded Sultan Shah, the ruler of Badakhshan, arrest the brothers. Sultan Shah accepted, likely wishing to receive Qing military aid against the Durrani Empire. However, after the Afaqi descendants had resided in Badakhshan for months and Sultan Shah initially refused to hand them over, possibly intending to send them to Bukhara, the Qing grew wary. Qianlong threatened an invasion, which did not come about as one of the descendant's remains were sent to Yarkand.

The death of the Afaqi brothers spurned relations with the Afghans, causing Sultan Shah to plead to the Qing, claiming Ahmad Shah intended to exact revenge for their deaths. No immediate Afghan invasion occurred. The Qing had faced numerous frustrations with their tributaries in Central Asia, alongside a major insurrection in Uch-Turfan that required tremendous effort to defeat. As a result, Qianlong adopted a policy of strict non-interference, realizing Qing troops in Altishahr were significantly stretched and spread thin. The Afghans, however, seen as a threat, would show the weakness of Qing control in the region.

In August 1768, Qianlong was informed of the Afghan invasion of Badakhshan led by Shah Wali Khan in May, with Afghan forces seizing Sultan Shah's capital Fayzabad. A Qing agent, Yunggui, proposed that the Qing should interfere in the conflict. Qianlong, however, affirmed military intervention would be irrational, and strictly forbade any military interference. Historians see this as surprising, as the invasion by the Afghans threatened the Qing Empire itself.

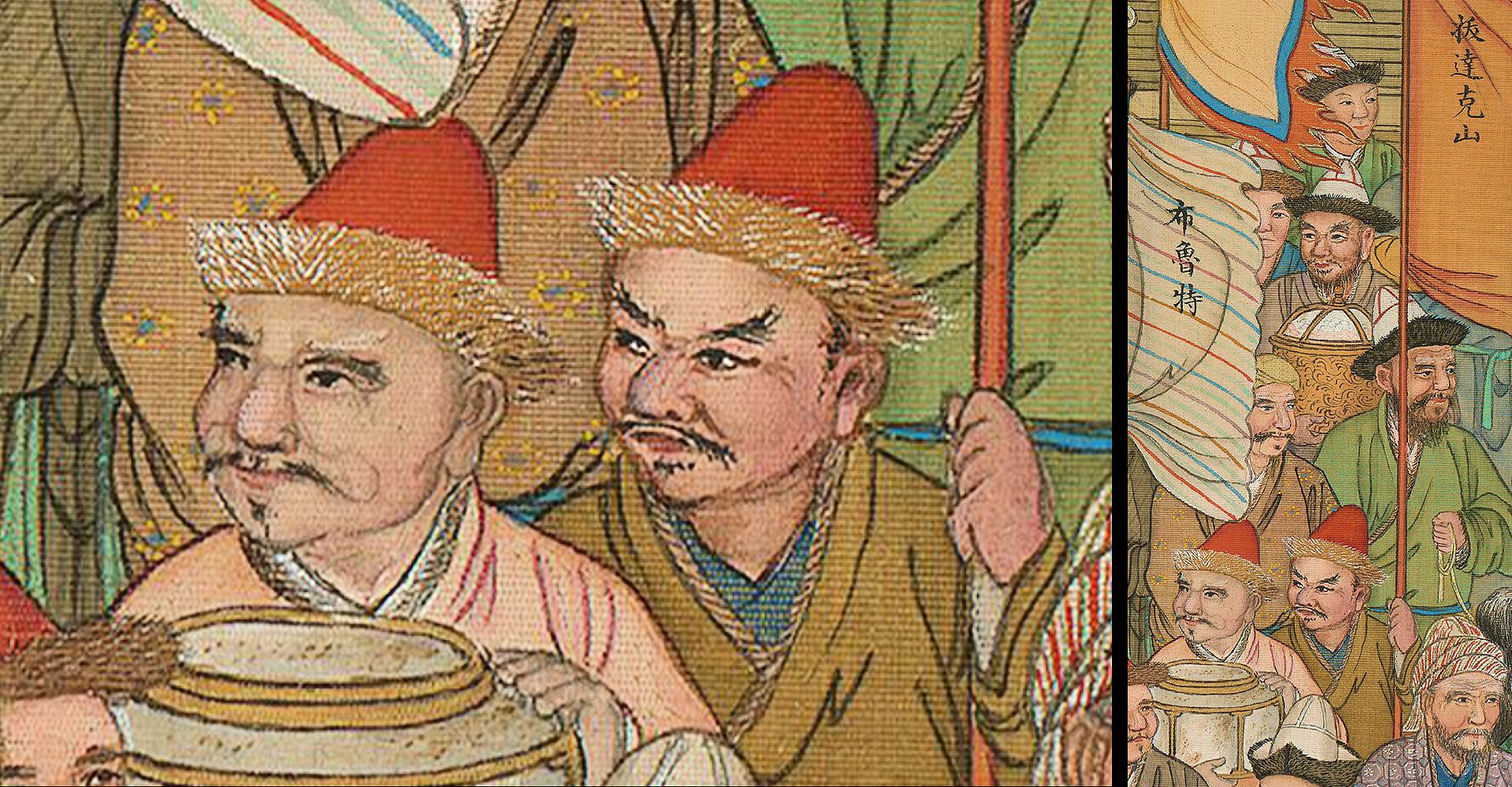
Delegates from Badakhshan in Peking, 1761

Qing sources affirm the Afghans had established Sarimsaq, a child of the Afaqi's who had escaped to Badakhshan, in Kunduz. Qianlong was distraught, as another possible revolt could revolve around Sarimsaq, especially after reports of Muslim travellers and funds sent to Sarimsaq arrived. This news still did not convince Qianlong to act, and he refused to send any negative response to Ahmad Shah at all. During this time, Sultan Shah had defeated the Afghan governor and reoccupied his capital. Fearing another Afghan invasion, he sent desperate letters to the Qing in winter 1768 to ask for help, claiming Ahmad Shah would invade next year. Qianlong rebutted, blaming Sultan Shah for provoking the conflict with the Afghans and affirmed he would only fight the Afghans if they actually invaded Qing territory. Sultan Shah wrote a letter to Emin Khoja in response in August 1769, expecting aid as he was a vassal, only to find himself abandoned. In December 1769, Sultan Shah wrote another letter accusing Qianlong of failing to uphold his duties. Qianlong rebuked him, and stated the Qing would not aid him under any circumstances.

We have long known that you have previously presented gifts to the Afghans. That you now have no more options but to evade the issue just shows that you are paying tribute to the Afghans! […] If you cannot protect your own lands, and wish to submit to the Afghans, then suit yourself! […] If you wish to rely on our armies to serve your enmities and to subjugate your neighboring tribes, then we will under no circumstances provide you with our troops.

— Qianlong's reply to Sultan Shah's plea for aid against Ahmad Shah

Qianlong had initially considered the Afghans tributaries, but after the former incident, he no longer sought the prospect of any form of Durrani submission. His reply to Sultan Shah effectively saw the Qing recognize the Afghans as a rival power to them, with Qianlong recognizing the Afghans could not be treated like tributaries. Rather than aiding the ruler of Badakhshan as his initial policy implicated him to, Qianlong instead justified the Afghan invasion, prompted by overextended armies, the distance, and stability. Instead, Qianlong gambled on the difficult terrain between the Afghan and Qing realms for safety. Within the same year, Ahmad Shah had occupied Badakhshan and Sultan Shah was executed.

=== Seventh invasion of India (1764–1765) ===
After Ahmad Shah returned to Afghanistan following his sixth invasion, the Sikhs reoccupied Lahore, chasing off the Shah's governor and sacking Kasur. The Sikhs followed up the victory by overrunning the Jalandhar Doab, while inflicting a crushing defeat on Jahan Khan at Sialkot in November 1763. The Sikhs continued their attacks, sacking the cities of Malerkotla and Morinda, and defeating another Afghan army at Sirhind, killing Zain Khan Sirhindi. The victories subsequently allowed the Sikhs to seize Rohtas and even plunder Multan, advancing up to the Derajat by the end of their campaigns.

Ahmad Shah initially tried to face this threat, fording the Indus River with 40,000 men in early 1764. However, the Sikhs assembled 100,000 men in response and attacked Ahmad Shah as he crossed the Chenab, routing him, where he withdrew back to Kandahar. Undiminished, Ahmad Shah declared a jihad, inviting his vassal Nasir Khan to march with him on Punjab. In October 1764, Ahmad Shah reached Eminabad in December with 18,000 men, further reinforced by Nasir Khan, who brought with him 12,000 men. The combined armies marched to Lahore, and a Sikh ambush on a scouting party near the city resulted in both sides withdrawing.

Ahmad Shah then proceeded with his army to Amritsar and sacked the city a third time before returning to Lahore. Frustrated he could not fight the Sikhs in a pitched battle, Ahmad Shah led his forces through the Jalandhar Doab and razed the Sikh homes and farms there, accumulating supplies for his army. The Afghans advanced through Jandiala, Batala, and Dina Nagar, fighting numerous engagements with the Sikhs which usually ended unfavourably or required heavy effort to repel. The entire countryside was destroyed by the Afghan advances.

After another battle in the Jalandhar Doab where the Sikhs were driven off, the Afghans crossed the Sutlej and repelled a Sikh army at Rupar Ghat from raiding their baggage train. After arriving at Kunjpura in late February 1765, Ahmad Shah's generals pleaded with him to return to Afghanistan, fearing the heat of the summer and the rain of monsoon seasons, instead suggesting they return the following winter.

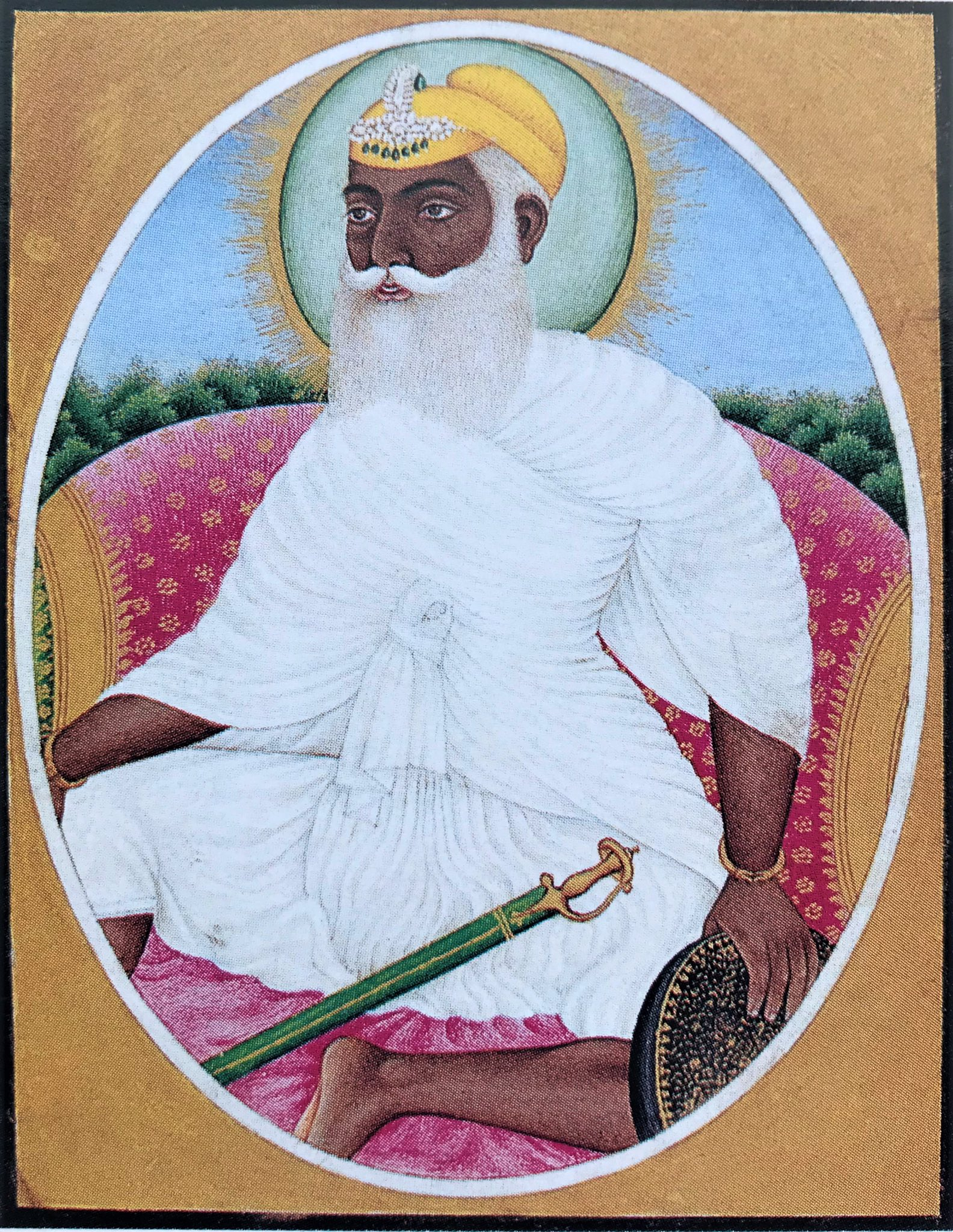
Painting of Ala Singh, whom Ahmad Shah had conferred the governorship of Sirhind

While returning to Afghanistan, Ahmad Shah conferred Sirhind on Ala Singh, a Sikh who had submitted to him. Ala Singh submitted the same tribute as other governors, paying a subsidy of 350,000 rupees annually. It was also believed the appointment would divide the Sikhs. This would later prove successful, as Ala Singh repelled an attack by the Dal Khalsa under Hari Singh Dhillon and also killed him.

After crossing the Sutlej, the Afghan army was set upon by the Sikhs and a battle ensued. Both sides eventually withdrew when nightfall came. On the second day a Sikh force attempted to harass the Afghan rear, but was repelled and the Sikhs suffered heavy casualties. Skirmishes on the third day saw the Sikhs continue hit-and-run tactics at Nurmahal, and a battle on the fourth day near Kapurthala saw the Afghans receive heavy casualties. A final battle on the seventh day took place on the Beas, where the Sikhs were routed and pursued.

Ahmad Shah completed his return to Afghanistan by the end of March, but suffered heavy casualties crossing the Chenab after reaching an incorrect area to ford the river, with thousands of men drowned or swept away by the current. Lee claims the Afghans suffered more casualties in the crossing than all of Ahmad Shah's battles with the Sikhs.

=== Eighth invasion of India (1766–1767) ===
In March 1765, the Sikhs had reoccupied Lahore and ousted the Shah's governor. As a result, Ahmad Shah began preparing for an eighth invasion of India. He was also possibly invited by the vakil of Mir Qasim, the former ruler of Bengal until he was deposed by the British. Shah Wali Khan, however, wrote to Lord Clive and affirmed the invasion was focused on the Sikhs.

In November 1766, Ahmad Shah launched his invasion. He forded the Indus River at Attock in December, and defeated a Sikh army under Ballam Singh at Behgy, near Rohtas. The Afghans continued their advance, encamping at Gujrat on 14 December, receiving many Muslim rulers in the region. Ahmad Shah then defeated another attempt by the Sikhs to oppose him on the other side of the Jhelum River, continuing his advance by reaching Ghuinke, defeating a Sikh contingent in a fort there, and then reaching Eminabad.

The Shah reached Lahore on 22 December, finding the Sikhs had deserted the city. The Afghans occupied the city, while Ahmad Shah dispatched a contingent of 1,500 to Sirhind. The Sikhs under Charat Singh assembled a force of 20,000 near Lahore, and Ahmad Shah assembled his own host of 50,000 in response. He dispatched Jahan Khan to Amritsar, forcing the Sikhs to withdraw. Ahmad Shah then encamped at Fatahabad on 28 December, south-east of Amritsar.

The Sikhs then raided the Shah's baggage train at Lahore, before retreating as Ahmad Shah approached on 1 January 1767. Ahmad Shah offered peace to the Sikhs, intending to march on Northern India and offering to divide lands for them, lest they fight him in the field. The Sikhs rejected all offers, and defeated Jahan Khan at Amritsar on 17 January. Ahmad Shah quickly came to his aid and attacked the Sikhs, forcing them to flee and destroying Amritsar. The Afghan baggage train was attacked during this time, but Nasir Khan routed and pursued the Sikh army.

Nobody should go ahead and none should move from his place. "..." Wait, the devilish foe will itself come to you. Do not step outside your ranks but stick to your place like the Caucasus mountains. When you find that the Dogs have approached you, fall on their heads. I have advised all the Ghazis similarly. When you move forward all of you should remain closely united. None should go ahead and nobody should lag behind, and no person should keep away from the main body. All should fall on the enemy in a body simultaneously.

— Ahmad Shah remarking to Nasir Khan prior to a battle with the Sikhs

Ahmad Shah then crossed the Beas River and received many sardars including Najib ud-Daula, as well as the vakils of Mir Qasim, the Jats, and Jaipur. When his invasion began, Ahmad Shah was surprised and infuriated when the chiefs of India who had sworn allegiance to him did not come to offer homage to him personally. The British also had Mughal Emperor Shah Alam II and Vizier Shuja ud-Daula refrain from sending aid to the Shah, fearing advances further east of Delhi. The British urged the Marathas, Rohillas, and Jats to form a coalition against Ahmad Shah, assuring British aid. Ahmad Shah, however, was seen as invincible in India following the victory at Panipat, with many chiefs being terrified of him.

Ahmad Shah continued his advance to Nurmahal, before reaching Machhiwara, where the Sikhs opposed his advance and harassed him. He attempted to pursue the Sikhs to no avail, while they inflicted a severe defeat on Nasir Khan. The Afghans continued and arrived at Ismailabad, south of Ambala, on 18 March. From there, Ahmad Shah declared his intention to march on Delhi, but Najib ud-Daula opposed this, saying the countryside would flee upon his arrival. With the Sikhs also harassing the rear of his army, Ahmad Shah chose to withdraw and focus on the Sikhs.

After withdrawing to Sirhind, Ahmad Shah organized numerous campaigns against the Sikhs within a month, and a large Sikh army at Mani Majra was defeated with many captured. The Sikh holy cities of Kiratpur and Anandpur were also sacked. During this time, Sikh forces began raiding Najib ud-Daula's domains, even storming Meerut on 14 May. Ahmad Shah dispatched Jahan Khan, who travelled around 300 km (190 mi) in three days by forced marches and defeated the Sikhs at Meerut, before returning. As the summer heat became unbearable and the monsoon season was nearing, Ahmad Shah withdrew by quick marches through Lahore back to Afghanistan. As he withdrew, Lahore was quickly reoccupied by the Sikhs.

=== Ninth invasion of India (1768–1769) ===
In December 1768, Ahmad Shah attempted a ninth invasion of India. His forces advanced as far as the Jhelum River, but the Sikhs fell back and attacked him from all directions. No loot could be garnered, and internal disputes rose within the Afghan army, forcing a complete withdrawal. As he withdrew between Peshawar and Kabul, the division in his army grew greater and his camp was plundered, with many killed as a result. This was the final invasion of India by Ahmad Shah, excluding three later attempts.

=== Tenth, eleventh, and attempted twelfth invasions of India (1769–1771) ===
Between late 1769 and autumn 1771, Ahmad Shah attempted three more invasions of India. In December 1769, he advanced toward Peshawar but was unsure on how to reach Delhi, withdrawing back to Kandahar. In June 1770, Ahmad Shah again advanced to Peshawar, planning an invasion of India. However, undetermined to fight the Sikhs, he again withdrew. In August 1771, Ahmad Shah planned an invasion of India, with strong rumours circulating of Ahmad Shah attacking in the winter. This was unfounded, and historian Robert Barker states Ahmad Shah would not cross the Indus due to opposition by the Sikhs.

=== Third Khorasan campaign (1769–1770) ===
Upon hearing of Afghan difficulties in Punjab, Nasrullah Mirza, son of the Afsharid ruler Shahrokh Shah, began preparing to declare independence. He first attempted to secure aid from Karim Khan Zand to no avail, before receiving support from the Kurds and raising an army in Chenaran. Ahmad Shah began marching from Herat to Khorasan between 1769 and 1770, occupying Torbat-e Jam and Langar. Nasrullah immediately rushed back to Mashhad, while Ahmad Shah arrived and besieged the city.

Nasrullah dispatched Nader Mirza Afshar to try and seek aid, which he did receive from the chief of Tabas, Ali Mardan Khan. The siege at Mashhad persisted, and sortie attempts against the Afghans were made. Reinforcements under Nader Mirza and Ali Mardan began arriving, and Ahmad Shah dispatched his general, Rasul Khan to battle against them. The Afghan contingent was repelled at Gonabad. Ahmad Shah sent a second army under Jahan Khan and Nasir Khan, which defeated the Persians, slaying Ali Mardan Khan and pursuing Nader Mirza as far as Soltanabad.

Not wishing to fire upon the city as it contained the Imam Reza shrine, negotiations were opened and successfully saw Shahrokh submit again to Afghan suzerainty. Shahrokh also had his daughter, Gauhar-Shad, married to Timur Shah Durrani, with the marriage completed in the Afghan camp. Despite the surrender of Shahrokh and Nasrullah, Ahmad Shah had no intention of directly annexing Khorasan, and instead left Shahrokh to rule under Afghan suzerainty, who also furnished troops for the Afghan army. To ensure loyalty, one of Shahrokh's sons, Yazdan Bakhsh, was taken as hostage. Ahmad Shah began marching back to Kandahar on 9 June, ending his final military campaign.

== Death ==
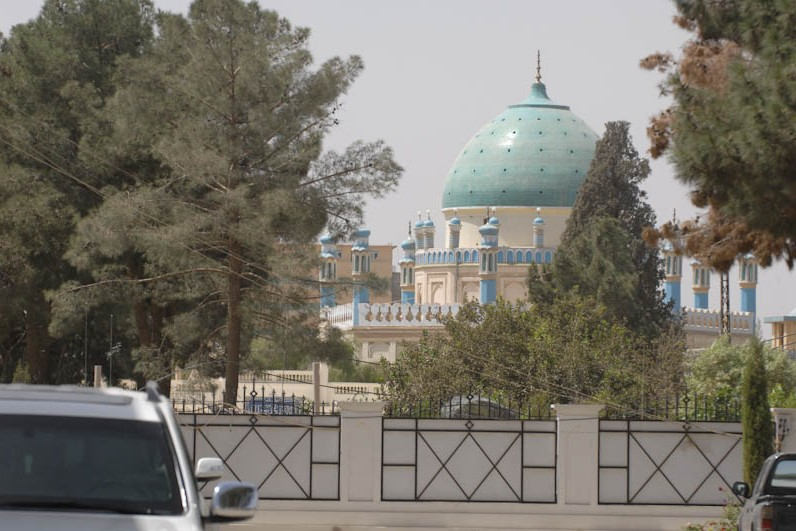
The tomb of Ahmad Shah Durrani in Kandahar; it is adjacent to the Kirka Sharif which contains the Cloak of Muhammad.

Ahmad Shah's relentless military campaigning took a serious toll on his health. Numerous reasons are attributed to his death, including a malignant wound on his nose, a form of facial cancer, or possibly a nose injury from blowing up Harmandir Sahib. The wound aggravated despite all attempts to cure it, and by summer 1772, Ahmad Shah had to be spoonfed and he could not verbally communicate. He retired to a palace in Maruf, east of Kandahar, eventually dying either on 16 or 23 October 1772. He was buried in Kandahar, where a mausoleum was later built by his son, Timur Shah Durrani in 1777. It is adjacent to the Kirka Sharif, brought to Afghanistan during Ahmad Shah's campaign against Bukhara in 1768.

== Children and succession ==
Hari Ram Gupta stated that Ahmad Shah had four sons, Sulaiman, Timur, Parwez, and Sikander. However, Noelle mentions another son, who was the youngest, Sanjar Mirza.

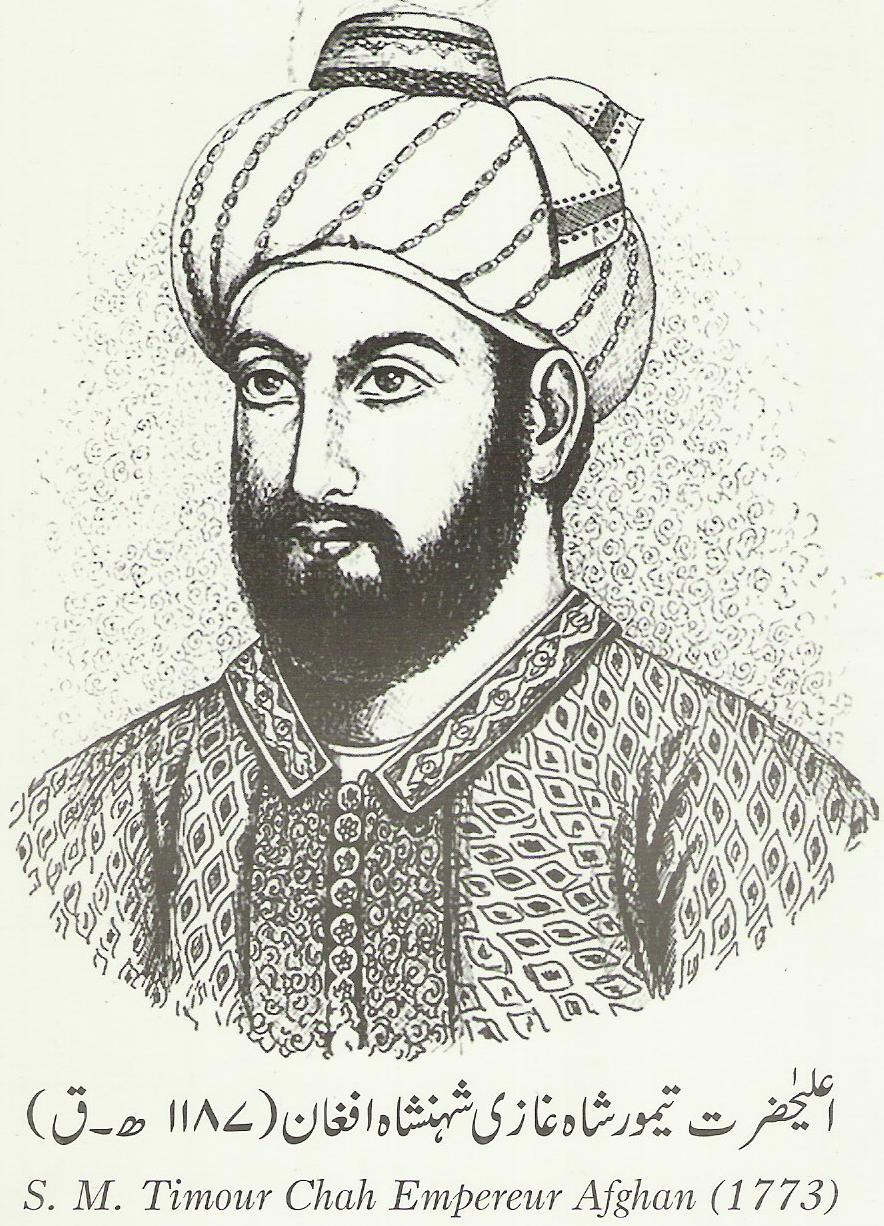
The son and successor of Ahmad Shah, Timur Shah Durrani

Before his death, Ahmad Shah nominated his younger son, Timur Shah Durrani, to succeed him, passing over his eldest son, Sulaiman Mirza. The announcement led to an internal conflict between factions loyal to Sulaiman and Timur. Ahmad Shah dismissed the faction of Sulaiman, proclaiming Timur far more capable than Sulaiman. However, Timur was left as governor at Herat, allowing the faction of Sulaiman to grow their influence. Upon Ahmad Shah's death, the faction of Sulaiman refused the throne to Timur, and gave it to Sulaiman, triggering a short civil war. Timur emerged victorious without battle, as support for Sulaiman had dissipated, and he fled to India. Later during the reign of Timur, his brother Sikander would become the main focus of a conspiracy to succeed to the Durrani throne after a plot on Timur's life that nearly succeeded in Peshawar.

== Legacy ==
=== Generalship and military campaigns ===
Historians widely regard Ahmad Shah as an excellent military leader and tactician, and he is compared to military leaders such as Marlborough, Mahmud of Ghazni, Babur, and Nader Shah. Throughout all his military campaigns, he had rarely ever lost a battle. Historian Kaushik Roy remarks that Ahmad Shah was one of the greatest generals of eighteenth century Asia. Hari Ram Gupta shares a similar notion, referring to Ahmad Shah as the "greatest general of Asia of his time", as well as one of the greatest conquerors in Asian history. His most notable military achievement was the decisive Third Battle of Panipat, the largest land battle of the century which pushed the Maratha Empire out of Northern India. The victory at Panipat created an aura of invincibility surrounding him, as later British attempts to form a coalition against Ahmad Shah failed due to many Indian chiefs being terrified of him. Throughout his reign as Shah, Ahmad Shah led over fifteen major military campaigns, including nine punishing invasions of India, three in Iranian Khorasan, and three in Afghan Turkestan. Despite this, his invasions of India had greater consequences and led to the decline of Muslim power in Northern India.

As he invaded India and occupied Delhi in 1757, most of the best men comprising the army of the Bengal Subah were forcibly deployed against Ahmad Shah's invasion. Months later, the army of the Bengal Subah, severely understrength, was crushed at the Battle of Plassey by the British. Later, in 1765, Mughal Emperor Shah Alam II ceded complete rule of Bengal, Bihar, and Orrisa to the British. Ahmad Shah's invasions thus, inadvertently, aided the rise of the British in India. Ahmad Shah also seemed much more interested in plundering rather than restoring Muslim power in India, and his refusal to shift his capital from Kandahar to India made the idea of forging an empire in India untenable. His invasions would also leave the Indian subcontinent in chaos and disorder.

Ahmad Shah introduced numerous military reforms, with the Durrani army being renowned for their excellent discipline, typically depending upon Ahmad Shah himself. He was able to introduce new tactics and technology surrounding mounted musketeers, as well as Zamburak light camel artillery. The death of Ahmad Shah saw a sharp decline in military strength for the Durranis. Jacques Lauriston, a French officer, observed: "...that which renders the Pathans superior is primarily the discipline and subordination so strictly observed in the Abdali [Durrani] army."

=== The Durrani Empire and Afghanistan ===
Seal of Ahmad Shah Durrani

Ahmad Shah is seen commonly as the founder of modern Afghanistan, with his relentless military campaigns forging an independent Afghanistan, and an empire stretching from the Oxus River in the north to the Gulf of Oman in the south. In the east, it stretched from the mountains of Tibet and Kashmir, to Iran and as far as Kerman in the western ends of his empire. However, his empire was already struggling even before his death. Even though Kashmir, Peshawar, Multan, and many other regions beyond the Indus were under Afghan control, much of Punjab fell into the hands of the Sikhs.

Ahmad Shah's empire was also less equated to his much earlier predecessors, the Ghaznavid and Mughal empires, who are largely remembered by their architecture and patronization of the arts. As Lee remarks: "...Ahmad Shah spent more time destroying civilizations than he did in establishing his own." Gupta also states Ahmad Shah may have been an excellent conqueror, but he failed in consolidating his empire. Next to the Ottoman Empire, the Durrani Empire is considered to be among the most significant Islamic empires of the second half of the 18th century.

=== Atrocities ===
Throughout Ahmad Shah's reign, he and his generals oversaw the indiscriminate massacre of thousands of civilians. This included the massacre of prisoners who had surrendered, as well as the mass desecration of both Sikh and Hindu holy sites. His men often put pilgrims and priests to death, committed rape, mass enslavement of women and children, and pillaging, with even Muslims being targeted. Ahmad Shah had also broke oaths of pardons and promises of safe conduct.

The Afghan wholesale massacres and enslavements in India, and the oppression of Sikhs and Hindus, as well as the destruction of their holy places shattered the former Mughal policy of religious tolerance. Stereotypes against Pashtuns also formed as a result, and they were deemed bloodthirsty zealots by the British and Indians alike.

=== Poetry ===
Ahmad Shah was a poet, authoring several poems in Pashto and occasionally Persian. His Diwan (collection of odes) showed visible Sufi influence. Significant influence also came from other Pashtun poets such as Khushal Khan Khattak and Rahman Baba. Ahmad Shah was known to admire Waqif, a poet from Batala, and even invited him to the Afghan court in Kandahar. Nizam al-Din 'Ishrat, another poet he had admired, was commissioned by Ahmad Shah to record his reign, composing the Shāhnāma-yi Aḥmadiyya, a mathnawi poem of 614 pages.

Ahmad Shah's poetry often contained traditional and religious themes, as well as philosophical, mystical, love, and moralistic themes. Love was often a common theme in Ahmad Shah's writings. While couplets with patriotic, social, ethnic, and cultural being found in his writing as well, indirectly mentioning the Pashtunwali, and love for his country.

In one such notable poem, Ahmad Shah wrote:

- Hearts are filled with the blood of love for you,
- On your way, youth lay down their heads.
- When I come back to you my heart calms down.
- Without you, my worries are like snakes on my heart.
- No matter how many countries of this world become mine,
- I will never forget your beautiful gardens
- I forget the throne of Delhi when I remember,
- The mountain tops of my beautiful Pashtunkhwa
- I shall throw around the goods of my enemy's life
- When the Pashtuns strike with their blades.
- The times of Farid and Hamid will return
- As I launch my raids in all directions.
- Even if the whole world is on one side and you are on the other,
- I love your barren and desolate steppes more.
- Ahmad Shah will never forget your value,
- Even if he conquers the countries of the whole world.

The poem by Ahmad Shah invokes his numerous invasions into India and the memory of past Afghan ancestors who had risen to supremacy over Northern India, including conquerors such as Sher Shah Suri, and Hamid Lodi, the ruler of Multan.

== Military record ==
Outcome	Date	War	Action	Opponent/s	Type	Country (present day)	Rank
Victory	26 November 1738	Nader Shah's invasion of India	Battle of Khyber Pass	Mughal Empire	Battle	Afghanistan, Pakistan	Ispahsalar
Victory	24 February 1739	Nader Shah's invasion of India	Battle of Karnal	Mughal Empire	Battle	India	Ispahsalar
Victory	24 February 1739	Nader Shah's invasion of India	Sack of Delhi	Mughal Empire	Sacking	India	Ispahsalar
Draw, Treaty of Kerden	1743–1746	Ottoman–Persian War (1743–1746)	Numerous actions in the war	Ottoman Empire	Battle	Iraq, Armenia, Georgia, Turkey	Ispahsalar
Victory	1747	Rise to power	Battle of Quchan	Qizilbash and Persians	Battle	Iran	Ispahsalar
Victory	1747	Rise to power	Battle of Farah	Afsharids	Battle	Afghanistan	Ispahsalar
Victory	Autumn 1747	Kabul campaign	Siege of Qalati Ghilji	Tokhi	Siege	Afghanistan	Shah
Victory	Autumn 1747	Kabul campaign	Battle of Ghazni	Mughal Empire	Battle	Afghanistan	Shah
Victory	Autumn 1747	Kabul campaign	Stratagem of Kabul	Mughal Empire	Defection	Afghanistan	Shah
Victory	11 January 1748	First invasion of India	Battle of Lahore	Mughal Empire	Battle	Pakistan	Shah
Defeat	11 March 1748	First invasion of India	Battle of Manupur	Mughal Empire; Kingdom of Jaipur; Malerkotla State	Battle	India	Shah
Victory	1749–1750	First Khorasan campaign	Siege of Herat	Afsharids	Siege	Afghanistan	Shah
Victory	1750	First Khorasan campaign	Nun (1750)	Afsharids	Siege	Iran	Shah
Victory	1750	First Khorasan campaign	Siege of Mashhad	Afsharids	Siege	Iran	Shah
Defeat	1750–1751	First Khorasan campaign	Siege of Nishapur	Qara Bayat Amirdom	Siege	Iran	Shah
Victory	6 March – 3 April 1752	Third invasion of India	Battle of Lahore	Mughal Empire	Battle	Pakistan	Shah
Victory	May 1754	Second Khorasan campaign	Sack of Tun	Governor of Tabas	Sack	Iran	Shah
Victory	May 1754	Second Khorasan campaign	Sack of Tabas	Governor of Tabas	Sack	Iran	Shah
Victory	23 July – 1 December 1754	Second Khorasan campaign	Siege of Mashhad	Afsharids	Siege	Iran	Shah
Victory	17–24 June 1755	Second Khorasan campaign	Siege of Nishapur	Qara Bayat Amirdom	Siege	Iran	Shah
Victory	28 January – 22 February 1757	Fourth invasion of India	Sack of Delhi	Mughal Empire; Bengal	Sacking	India	Shah
Victory	4 February – March 1757	Fourth invasion of India	Siege of Ballabhgarh	Bharatpur State	Siege	India	Shah
Victory	16 March 1757	Fourth invasion of India	Battle of Gokul	Naga Sadhus	Battle	India	Shah
Victory	Summer 1758	Kalat rebellion	Battle of Mastung	Khanate of Kalat	Battle	Pakistan	Shah
Victory	1758–1759	Kalat rebellion	Siege of Kalat	Khanate of Kalat	Siege	Pakistan	Shah
Victory	24 December 1759	Afghan–Maratha War (Fifth invasion of India)	Battle of Taraori	Maratha Empire	Battle	India	Shah
Victory	9 January 1760	Afghan–Maratha War (Fifth invasion of India)	Battle of Barari Ghat	Maratha Empire	Battle	India	Shah
Victory	4 March 1760	Afghan–Maratha War (Fifth invasion of India)	Battle of Sikandarabad	Maratha Empire	Battle	India	Shah
Victory	March 1760	Afghan–Maratha War (Fifth invasion of India)	Siege of Aligarh	Maratha Empire	Siege	India	Shah
Victory	October–November 1760	Afghan–Maratha War (Fifth invasion of India)	Samalkha	Maratha Empire	Battle	India	Shah
Victory	17 December 1760	Afghan–Maratha War (Fifth invasion of India)	Battle of Meerut	Maratha Empire	Battle	India	Shah
Victory	14 January 1761	Afghan–Maratha War (Fifth invasion of India)	Third Battle of Panipat	Maratha Empire	Battle	India	Shah
Victory	5 February 1762	Afghan–Sikh Wars (Sixth invasion of India)	Battle of Kup	Sikh Confederacy	Battle	India	Shah
Victory	February 1762	Afghan–Sikh Wars (Sixth invasion of India)	Siege of Barnala	Patiala State	Siege	India	Shah
Victory	10 April 1762	Afghan–Sikh Wars (Sixth invasion of India)	Sacking of Amritsar	Sikh Confederacy	Sacking	India	Shah
Draw, result disputed	17 October 1762	Afghan–Sikh Wars (Sixth invasion of India)	Battle of Pipli Sahib	Sikh Confederacy	Battle	India	Shah
Victory	12 December 1762	Afghan–Sikh Wars (Sixth invasion of India)	Battle of the Ravi Ford	Sikh Confederacy	Battle	Pakistan	Shah
Defeat	Early 1764	Afghan–Sikh Wars (Seventh invasion of India)	Battle of Chenab	Sikh Confederacy	Battle	India	Shah
Victory	1764	Afghan–Sikh Wars (Seventh invasion of India)	Battle of Qarawal	Sikh Confederacy	Battle	Pakistan	Shah
Victory	1 December 1764	Afghan–Sikh Wars (Seventh invasion of India)	Battle of Amritsar	Sikh Confederacy	Battle	India	Shah
Victory	1765	Afghan–Sikh Wars (Seventh invasion of India)	Battle of Jalandhar Doab	Sikh Confederacy	Battle	India	Shah
Victory	1765	Afghan–Sikh Wars (Seventh invasion of India)	Battle of Rupar Ghat	Sikh Confederacy	Battle	India	Shah
Victory	1765	Afghan–Sikh Wars (Seventh invasion of India)	Battle of Sutlej	Sikh Confederacy	Battle	India	Shah
Draw, no decisive engagement	1765	Afghan–Sikh Wars (Seventh invasion of India)	Battle of Nurmahal	Sikh Confederacy	Battle	India	Shah
Draw, no decisive engagement	1765	Afghan–Sikh Wars (Seventh invasion of India)	Battle of Kapurthala	Sikh Confederacy	Battle	India	Shah
Victory	1765	Afghan–Sikh Wars (Seventh invasion of India)	Battle of Beas	Sikh Confederacy	Battle	India	Shah
Victory	December 1766	Afghan–Sikh Wars (Eighth invasion of India)	Battle of Behgy	Sikh Confederacy	Battle	Pakistan	Shah
Victory	December 1766	Afghan–Sikh Wars (Eighth invasion of India)	Battle of Jhelum	Sikh Confederacy	Battle	Pakistan	Shah
Victory	January 1767	Afghan–Sikh Wars (Eighth invasion of India)	Sack of Amritsar	Sikh Confederacy	Sack	India	Shah
Victory	1767	Afghan–Sikh Wars (Eighth invasion of India)	Battle of Mani Majra	Sikh Confederacy	Battle	India	Shah
Draw, no decisive engagement	1769	Afghan–Sikh Wars (Ninth invasion of India)	Battle of Jhelum	Sikh Confederacy	Battle	Pakistan	Shah
Victory	1769–1770	Afghan–Sikh Wars (Third Khorasan campaign)	Siege of Mashhad	Afsharids	Siege	Iran	Shah

== In popular culture ==
- In the 1994 television series The Great Maratha, the character of Ahmad Shah Durrani is portrayed by Bob Christo.
- In the 2019 Bollywood war drama film Panipat, Ahmad Shah Durrani appears as the main antagonist who invades the Maratha Empire, and is portrayed by Sanjay Dutt.

== See also ==
- List of monarchs of Afghanistan
- Dost Mohammad Khan
- Barakzai dynasty

== Bibliography ==
- Adamec, Ludwig W. (7 April 2010). The A to Z of Afghan Wars, Revolutions and Insurgencies. Bloomsbury Publishing. ISBN 978-1-4617-3189-4.
- Balland, Daniel (15 December 1995). "DORRĀNĪ". Encyclopaedia Iranica. Archived from the original on 9 October 2023.
- Barfield, Thomas (6 December 2022). Afghanistan: A Cultural and Political History, Second Edition. Princeton University Press. ISBN 978-0-691-23856-2.
- Barua, Pradeep (1 January 2005). The State at War in South Asia. University of Nebraska Press. ISBN 978-0-8032-1344-9.
- Black, Jeremy (2002). Warfare in the Eighteenth Century. Cassell. ISBN 978-0-304-36212-7.
- Burnard, Trevor; Hart, Emma; Houllemare, Marie (2024). The Oxford Handbook of the Seven Years' War. Oxford University Press. ISBN 978-0-19-762260-5.
- Chahryar, Adle; Baipakov, Karl M.; Irfan, Habib (31 December 2003). History of Civilizations of Central Asia: Development in Contrast: from the Sixteenth to the Mid-nineteenth Century. UNESCO Publishing. ISBN 978-92-3-103876-1.
- Chaurasia, Radhey Shyam (2002). History of Medieval India: From 1000 A.D. to 1707 A.D. Atlantic Publishers. ISBN 978-81-269-0123-4.
- Clements, Frank A.; Adamec, Ludwig W. (2 December 2003). Conflict in Afghanistan: An Encyclopedia. Bloomsbury Publishing USA. ISBN 978-1-85109-407-3.
- Dalrymple, William; Anand, Anita (2016). Kohinoor: The Story of the World's Most Infamous Diamond. Juggernaut Books. ISBN 978-93-86228-08-6.
- Dupree, Louis (1980). Afghanistan. Princeton University Press. ISBN 0-691-03006-5.
- Dupuy, Richard Ernest; Dupuy, Trevor Nevitt (1977). The Encyclopedia of Military History from 3500 B.C. to the Present. Harper & Row. ISBN 978-0-06-011139-7.
- Eijk, Juul; Khan, Timur (7 June 2023). "'Do You Not Bow before Heaven?': The First Qing- Durrānī Encounter, the Tributary Non-relationship, and Disorder on a Shared Frontier". Journal of the Economic and Social History of the Orient. 66 (5–6): 707–741. doi:10.1163/15685209-12341605. ISSN 1568-5209.
- Gommans, Jos (1 August 1995). "Indian Warfare and Afghan Innovation During the Eighteenth Century". Studies in History. 11 (2): 261–280. doi:10.1177/025764309501100204. ISSN 0257-6430.
- Grewal, J. S. (2004). The Khalsa Sikh and Non-Sikh Perspectives. Manohar. p. 23. ISBN 9788173045806.
- Gupta, Hari Ram (1978). History of the Sikhs: Evolution of Sikh Confederacies, 1708-1769. Munshiram Manoharlal.
- Gupta, Hari Ram (1976). Later Mughal History of the Panjab (1707-1793). Sang-e-Meel Publications.
- Gupta, Hari Ram (1961). Marathas and Panipat. Panjab University.
- Jr, Everett Jenkins (7 May 2015). The Muslim Diaspora (Volume 2, 1500-1799): A Comprehensive Chronology of the Spread of Islam in Asia, Africa, Europe and the Americas. McFarland. ISBN 978-1-4766-0889-1.
- K. Palat, Madhavan; Tabyshalieva, Anara (2003). History of Civilizations of Central Asia: Development in Contrast: From the Sixteenth to the Mid-nineteenth Century. UNESCO Publishing. ISBN 978-92-3-103876-1.
- Khan Durrani, Ashiq Muhammad (1991). "The People of Afghanistan: Relations between the Sadozais and the Ahmadzais of Qalat". ProQuest – via Google drive.
- Khoja, Neelam (2018). "Sovereignty, Space, and Identity: The Politics of Power in Eighteenth Century Punjab".
- Kim, Hodong (2004). Holy War in China: The Muslim Rebellion and State in Chinese Central Asia, 1864-1877. Stanford University Press. ISBN 978-0-8047-6723-1.
- Lamb, Christina (3 February 2004). The Sewing Circles of Herat: A Personal Voyage Through Afghanistan. Harper Collins. ISBN 978-0-06-050527-1.
- Lee, Jonathan L. (1996). The "ancient Supremacy": Bukhara, Afghanistan, and the Battle for Balkh, 1731-1901. E.J. Brill. ISBN 978-90-04-10399-3.
- Lee, Jonathan L. (8 March 2022). Afghanistan: A History from 1260 to the Present. Reaktion Books. ISBN 978-1-78914-019-4.
- Levi, Scott C. (2017). The Rise and Fall of Khoqand, 1709-1876: Central Asia in the Global Age. University of Pittsburgh Press. ISBN 978-0-8229-6506-0.
- Malhotra, Karamjit K. (2016). The Eighteenth Century in Sikh History: Political Resurgence, Religious and Social Life, and Cultural Articulation. Oxford University Press. ISBN 978-0-19-908760-0.
- Masaeli, Mahmoud; Sneller, Rico (2 January 2020). Responses of Mysticism to Religious Terrorism: Sufism and Beyond. Gompel&Svacina. ISBN 978-94-6371-190-6.
- Mehta, Jaswant Lal (1 January 2005). Advanced Study in the History of Modern India 1707-1813. Sterling Publishers. ISBN 978-1-932705-54-6.
- Mishra, Patit Paban (20 October 2024). An Encyclopaedia in Spatio-Temporal Dimensions: Biography, Culture, and Religion. Cambridge Scholars Publishing. ISBN 978-1-0364-1367-5.
- Nejatie, Sajjad (2017). The Pearl of Pearls: The Abdālī-Durrānī Confederacy and Its Transformation under Aḥmad Shāh, Durr-i Durrān (PhD). University of Toronto. Archived from the original on 4 February 2022.
- Newby, L. J. (2005). The Empire And the Khanate: A Political History of Qing Relations With Khoqand C1760-1860. BRILL. ISBN 978-90-04-14550-4.
- Noelle-Karimi, Christine (1997). State and Tribe in Nineteenth-century Afghanistan: The Reign of Amir Dost Muhammad Khan (1826-1863). Psychology Press. ISBN 978-0-7007-0629-7.
- Noelle-Karimi, Christine (2014). The Pearl in Its Midst: Herat and the Mapping of Khurasan (15th-19th Centuries). Austrian Academy of Sciences Press. ISBN 978-3-7001-7202-4.
- Parmu, R. K. (1969). A History of Muslim Rule in Kashmir, 1320-1819. People's Publishing House.
- Pelevin, Mikhail (28 July 2025). Love, Honour and God: Pashto Writings of Early Modern Times. BRILL. ISBN 978-90-04-73735-8.
- Perry, John R. (1985). "ʿALAM KHAN". Encyclopedia Iranica.
- Roy, Kaushik (2004). India's Historic Battles: From Alexander the Great to Kargil. Orient Blackswan. ISBN 978-81-7824-109-8.
- Rubin, Barnett R. (25 March 2015). Afghanistan from the Cold War Through the War on Terror. Oxford University Press. ISBN 978-0-19-022927-6.
- Runion, Meredith L. (2007). The history of Afghanistan. Greenwood Publishing Group. ISBN 978-0-313-33798-7.
- Sardesai, D. R. (4 May 2018). India: The Definitive History. Routledge. ISBN 978-0-429-96842-6.
- Sarkar, Sir Jadunath (1964). Fall of the Mughal Empire. M. C. Sarkar.
- Sarkar, Sir Jadunath (1971). 1754-1771 (Panipat) (3rd; 1966, 1971 printing ed.). Orient Longman.
- Singh, Ganda (1959). Ahmad Shah Durrani: Father of Modern Afghanistan. Asia Publishing House. ISBN 978-1-4021-7278-6.
- Singh, Khushwant (1977). A History of the Sikhs. Oxford University Press. ISBN 978-0-19-560600-3.
- Verma, Esha (1 January 2016). Sindh in Transition: From Mughal Rule to British Annexation, Early Eighteenth Century to 1843 (thesis thesis). Open Access Te Herenga Waka-Victoria University of Wellington.

Regnal titles
Preceded by Position established	Emir of Afghanistan; 1747–1772	Succeeded by Timur Shah Durrani
