= Mausoleum of Baba Wali =

Coordinates: 31°39′30″N 65°39′23″E

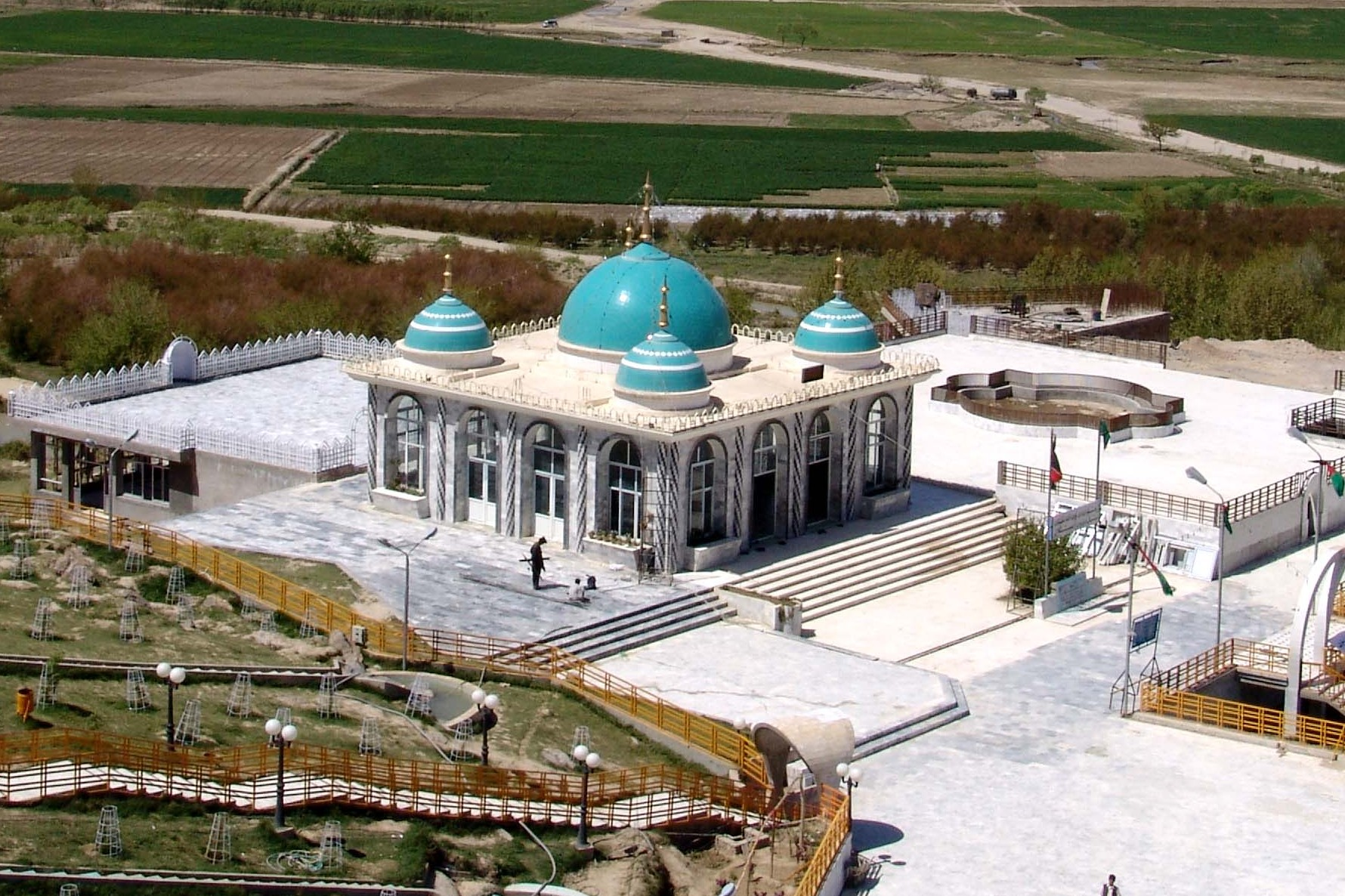
The mausoleum of Baba Wali Kandhari, 2003

The Mausoleum of Baba Wali is one of the popular historical monuments in the Arghandab District of Kandahar Province in southern Afghanistan. The site is dedicated to a 15th-century Muslim holy man, Baba Wali Kandhari. It is located about 20 km (12 mi) to the northeast of Kandahar, on the banks of the Arghandab River and just west of the Kandahar–Tarinkot Highway. The mausoleum attracts many local and foreign tourists while visiting Kandahar. Nearby is a restaurant that specializes in fried fish.

== See also ==
- Tourism in Afghanistan
