= Zarghona Anaa =

Afghan poet

Zarghona Anna (Pashto: زرغونه انا) (death 1772), also written as Zarghona Anaa (born as Zarguna Begum Alakozai) was an Afghan poet. She was the mother of Ahmad Shah Durrani (r. 1747–1772). Her mausoleum is located in the Kohak village of Arghandab District in southern Kandahar Province of Afghanistan, a short distance to the west of Baba Wali Kandhari's historical site.

Zarghona Anna was the daughter of Khalu Khan Alakozai and was married to Mohammad Zaman Khan. Her son took control of the Afghan throne in Kandahar in 1747. She was active as a poet, and enjoyed great respect for her ability as a poet and her strict adherence to the Pashtunwali moral code. She is known to have had great influence over the affairs of state through her son; she controlled Kandahar and acted as a mediator in Pashtun tribal conflicts in place of her son when he was on military campaign. A number of high schools in Afghanistan are named in her honor.

== See also ==
- List of Pashto-language poets
- Tourism in Afghanistan
- Women in Afghanistan
