= Malalay University =

University in Kandahar, Afghanistan

- ملالۍ د لوړو زده کړو مؤسسه / مؤسسه تحصیلات عالی ملالی
- Motto: له تیارو څخه رڼا ته
- Motto in English: From darkness to light
- Type: Private
- Established: 2012
- Chairman: Asst. Prof. Qudratullah Ahmadi
- Chancellor: Asst. Prof. Abdul Malik Niazai
- Faculty: 30 Academic staff, 2 Faculty Medical, Law & Political Science
- Administrative staff: 50
- Students: 1300 Male & Female
- Undergraduates: 220 Law & Political Science
- Location: Kandahar, Afghanistan
- Colors: Light Blue, Gray, and white
- Website: www.malalay.edu.af

Malalay Institute of Higher Education (Pashto:ملالۍ د لوړو زده کړو مؤسسه / Dari:مؤسسه تحصیلات عالی ملالی) is a private university established in 2012 located in Kandahar, Afghanistan.

It began its operation in a country that was experiencing privatization in higher education for the first time. The Institute quickly became one of the largest private higher education institutions in the city.

Malalay Institute currently offers Medical, Law-Political Science at the undergraduate level.

== History ==
Malalay Institute of Higher Education was established by a group of professors and lecturers from national and international universities, for filling need of higher education in the region.

== Faculties ==
Faculty of Medical, having six departments, faculty of Law and Political science that also has two departments.

== Library ==
The library has more than 100000 Pashto, Dari, and English books for students in hard and soft copies.
