= Operation Dreamseed =

US-based non-governmental organization

- Abbreviation: ODS
- Formation: 2004
- Type: INGO
- Legal status: 501(c)(3) non-profit organization
- Purpose: education
- Headquarters: Rhinebeck, New York
- Region served: Underdeveloped nations
- Executive Director: Daya Watkins
- Main organ: board of directors
- Affiliations: Peace Through Art, Help the Afghan Children
- Website: www.operationdreamseed.org (inactive)

Operation Dreamseed was a New York-based non-governmental organization that supported educational initiatives in underdeveloped nations. Founded in August 2004 by U.S. Army Major Todd Schmidt while he was deployed to Afghanistan, the program delivered school supplies through American military servicemembers working with local residents.

== History ==
While patrolling from Kandahar Airfield during his tour of duty, Major Schmidt, along with thousands of other American and Coalition troops, became aware of the dire conditions of the schools and the education system in the Southern Region.

Major Schmidt worked with the law firm of Shearman & Sterling, LLP, to incorporate Operation Dreamseed in the State of New York. Operation Dreamseed was officially incorporated on November 12, 2004. An initial grant of $10,000 was provided by Spirit of America in March 2005 for the organization to establish its operations on a larger scale and to accomplish its first large projects in Kandahar.

== Activities ==
Operation Dreamseed's first action began with volunteers packing and shipping boxes of school supplies for military servicemembers to distribute in Afghanistan. In 2005, in cooperation with Help the Afghan Children, Operation Dreamseed helped renovate and rebuild Kohak Village Primary School in Kandahar City. In 2009, Operation Dreamseed completed work on building a basic science lab in Kandahar City at Aino Girls' School.

As Operation Dreamseed grew the organization spread its scope to Iraq, Kosovo, Nicaragua and Colombia.

Operation Dreamseed also helped to launch a second international non-governmental organization, The changeIT Project in 2009, under the leadership of Christian Nielsen of Quinnipiac University. The changeIT Project provides ESL grants to disadvantaged students in Nicaragua to assist them in attending school and learning English.

== Awards ==
- 2007: Microsoft Above and Beyond Everyday Difference Award

== See also ==
- Education in Afghanistan
- Help Afghan School Children Organization
