= Red Mosque, Kandahar =

Mosque in Kandahar, Afghanistan

Red Mosque
- سره جامعه

Religion
- Affiliation: Islam
- Ecclesiastical or organizational status: Mosque
- Status: Active

Location
- Location: Kandahar
- Country: Afghanistan
- Interactive map of Red Mosque
- Coordinates: 31°36′53″N 65°41′11″E

Architecture
- Type: Mosque architecture
- Style: Afghan-Islamic
- Completed: 1951

Specifications
- Dome: 22
- Minaret: 2

The Red Mosque (Pashto: سره جامعه) is one of many mosques in Kandahar, Afghanistan. It is located at a crossroad in the Shahr-e Naw neighborhood of the city, on the Kandahar–Helmand Highway between the Ahmad Shah Baba High School and the 200-bed Mohmand Hospital.

== See also ==
- List of mosques in Afghanistan
