= Mausoleum of Mirwais Hotak =

Coordinates: 31°37′07″N 65°36′12″E

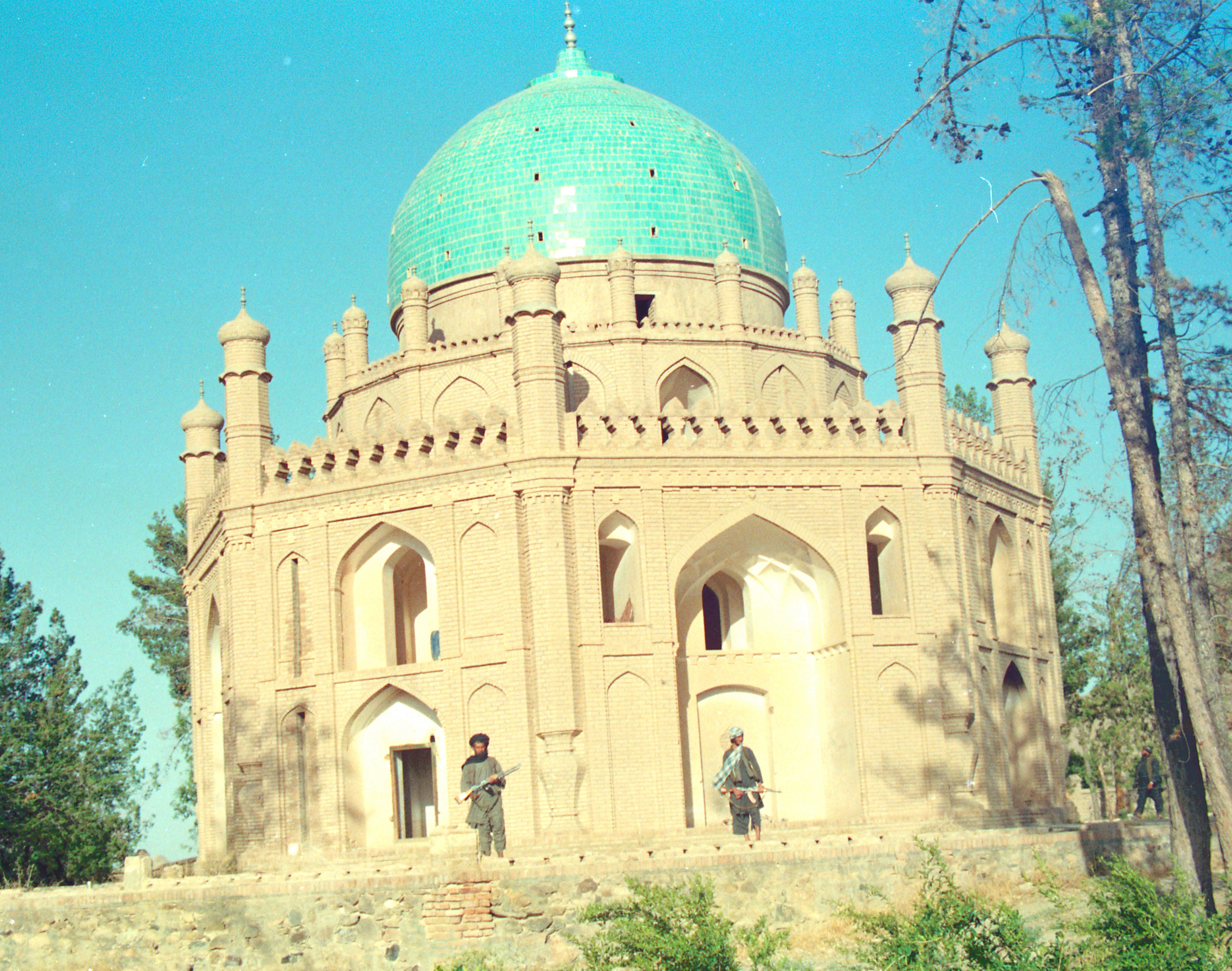
The mausoleum of Mirwais Hotak in 1989

The Mausoleum of Mirwais Hotak is one of the most important historical monuments in Kandahar, Afghanistan. It is where the founder of the Hotak dynasty, Mirwais Hotak, is buried.

Located next to the Kandahar–Herat Highway in Dand District between Mirwais Mayna and Bagh-e Pul, the mausoleum attracts many local and foreign tourists while visiting Kandahar.

== See also ==
- Tourism in Afghanistan
