= Kandahar Museum =

Museum in Kandahar, Afghanistan

- Location: Kandahar, Afghanistan
- Collection size: 1,900

The Kandahar Museum is a museum located in Kandahar, Afghanistan. It has around 1,900 artifacts.

== See also ==
- Culture of Afghanistan
- List of museums in Afghanistan
- Tourism in Afghanistan
