= Khan Mohammad Mujahid =

Afghan senior policeman (1961–2011)

Khan Mohammad "Mujahid"
- جنرال خان محمد مجاهد
- Born: 1961; Kandahar, Arghandab District, Afghanistan
- Died: 15 April 2011 (aged 49–50); Arghandab District
- Cause of death: Murder
- Occupation: Senior police officer
- Employer: Afghan Government

General Khan Mohammad "Mujahid" (Pashto: جنرال خان محمد مجاهد) (1961 - 15 April 2011) was a senior policeman in Afghanistan. He was killed by a suicide bomber in 2011.

He was born in 1961 in Arghandab District near Kandahar, a member of the Alokozay tribe. He fought against the Soviet occupation of Afghanistan and against the Taliban. He became chief of police in Ghazni and moved in 2009 to Kandahar where he was responsible for the policing of the south of Kandahar Province.

On 15 April 2011 he was killed in a suicide bombing at the Kandahar police headquarters. The Taliban claimed responsibility for his murder.
