= Ghulam Haider Hamidi =

Former mayor of Kandahar (1947–2011)

Sharwal Ghulam Haider Hamidi
- غلام حیدر حمیدی
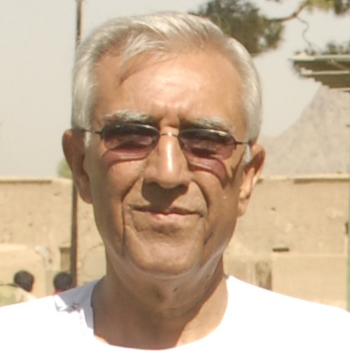

Mayor of Kandahar
- In office February 2006 – 27 July 2011
- Succeeded by: Muhammad Nasim Naseem (interim)

Personal details
- Born: 1947 Arghandab District, Kandahar Province, Afghanistan
- Died: 27 July 2011 (aged 65) Kandahar, Afghanistan
- Education: Kabul University
- Occupation: Mayor, accountant

Ghulam Haider Hamidi (Pashto: غلام حیدر حمیدی, also spelled Ghulam Haidar Hameedi and also known as Henry Hamidi; 1945 – 27 July 2011) was the Mayor of Kandahar in Afghanistan. During Taliban rule, his family fled to Pakistan, then to the United States.

Hamidi graduated from Kabul University with a degree in finance. He spent a brief period in Pakistan and lived in the United States for almost nineteen years. He settled in the Washington, D.C. area, and worked as an accountant at Trans Am Travel, a wholesale travel agency in Alexandria, Virginia. In 2007, he returned to Afghanistan when the country was under the Karzai administration.

In the late afternoon of 26 July 2011 a plot was discovered by the SFA Team 5 that there was an active plot to assassinate Hamidi by a turban bomb. The team thwarted the attack that day. The team was not present the following morning on 27 July 2011. Hamidi was killed at the municipal building in Kandahar on the morning of July 27, 2011 by a man who had hidden explosives inside his turban. As Hamidi greeted elders in the morning as he often did a man reached up and touched two wires together setting off the explosives killing himself and Hamidi. The target killing or assassination was blamed on the Taliban insurgents, who are guided and supported by foreign elements such as Pakistan's ISI spy agency and Iran's Revolutionary Guard's Quds Force.

Two other associates of Afghan President Hamid Karzai – his half brother Ahmad Wali Karzai and Jan Mohammad Khan – were assassinated in the weeks that preceded Haider's killing. Two of Hamidi's deputies and a police chief were previously assassinated. Hamidi himself survived a 2009 bomb attack on his car.
