= Kandahar Stadium =

Multi-purpose stadium in Kandahar, Afghanistan

- Kandahar Football Stadium
- Full name: Kandahar Football Stadium
- Location: Kandahar, Afghanistan
- Owner: Afghanistan National Olympic Committee
- Capacity: 5,000
- Surface: Artificial turf

Construction
- Built: 2011
- Opened: 2011

Tenants
- Afghanistan national football team De Maiwand Atalan F.C.

Kandahar Stadium (Pashto: د کندهار لوبغالی) is a multi-purpose stadium in Kandahar, Afghanistan. The stadium is used mainly for association football matches.

It is sometimes called by other names such as the Kandahar Football Stadium. The stadium was built in 2011 after the entire soil was replaced and artificial turf placed on top. The stadium now holds bigger sporting events.
