= Baba Wali Kandhari =

Sufi pir

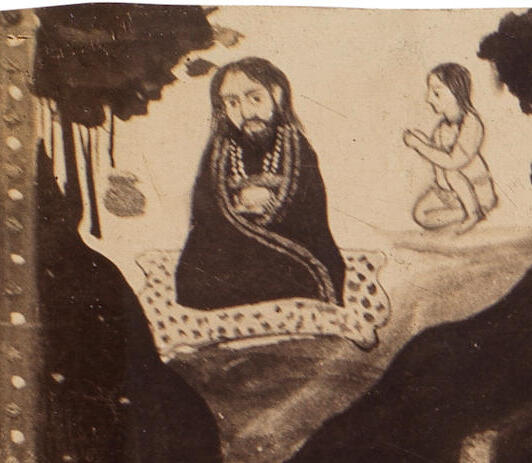

Personal life
- Born: c. 1476 CE; Kandahar, Timurid Empire, (Afghanistan)
- Died: c. 1529 (aged 52–53) years Baba Wali, Kandahar

Religious life
- Religion: Islam
- Sect: Sufism

Baba Wali Kandhari was a Sufi pir who was born in c. 1476 at Kandahar, in the Timurid Empire, in modern-day Afghanistan. In about 1498, he moved to Hasan Abdal to the western side of mountains. The terrain was hilly and natural fountains used to flow from the ground.

== Encounter with Guru Nanak ==
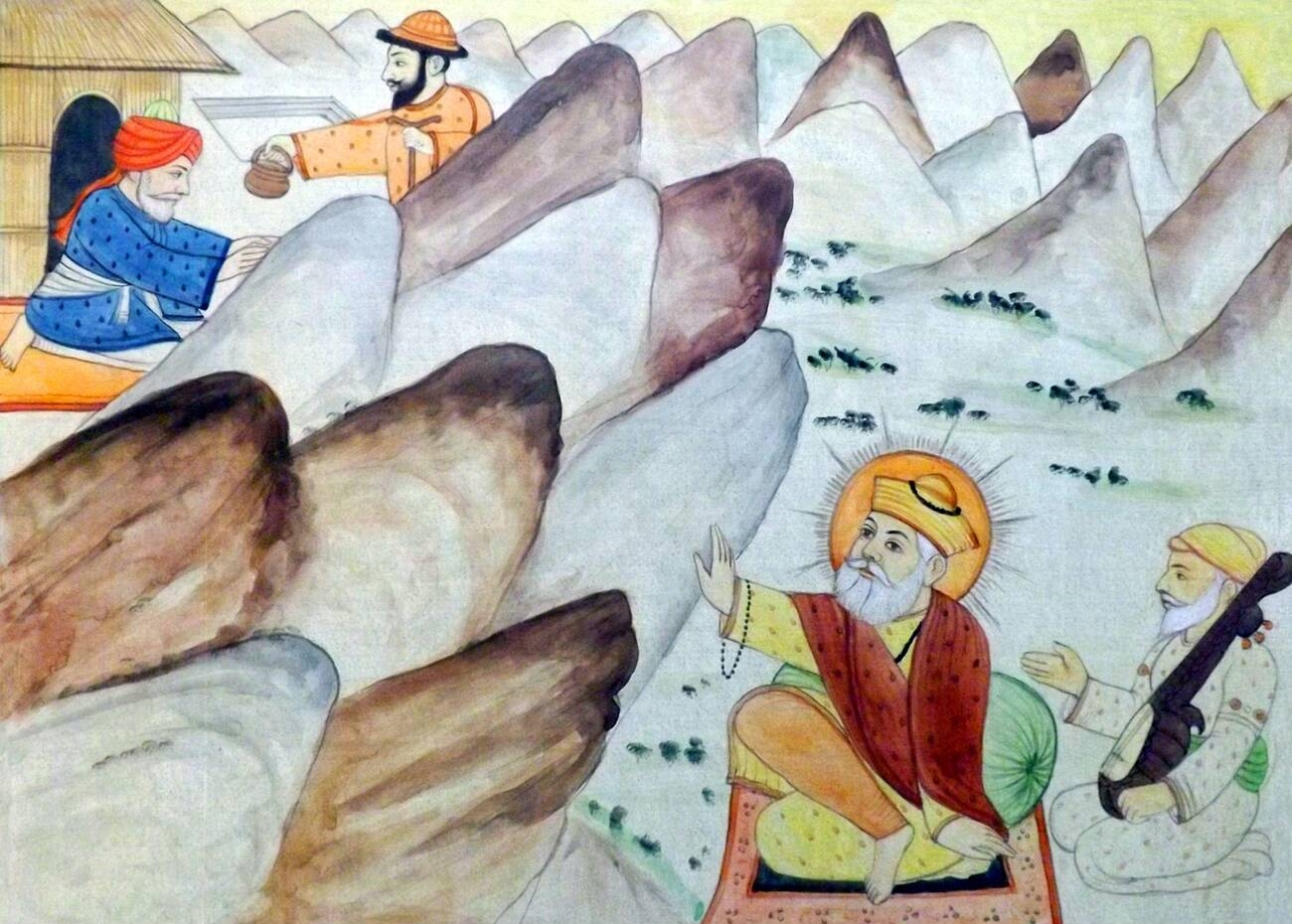
Guru Nanak stops the rock from falling with his hand, 19th century artwork.

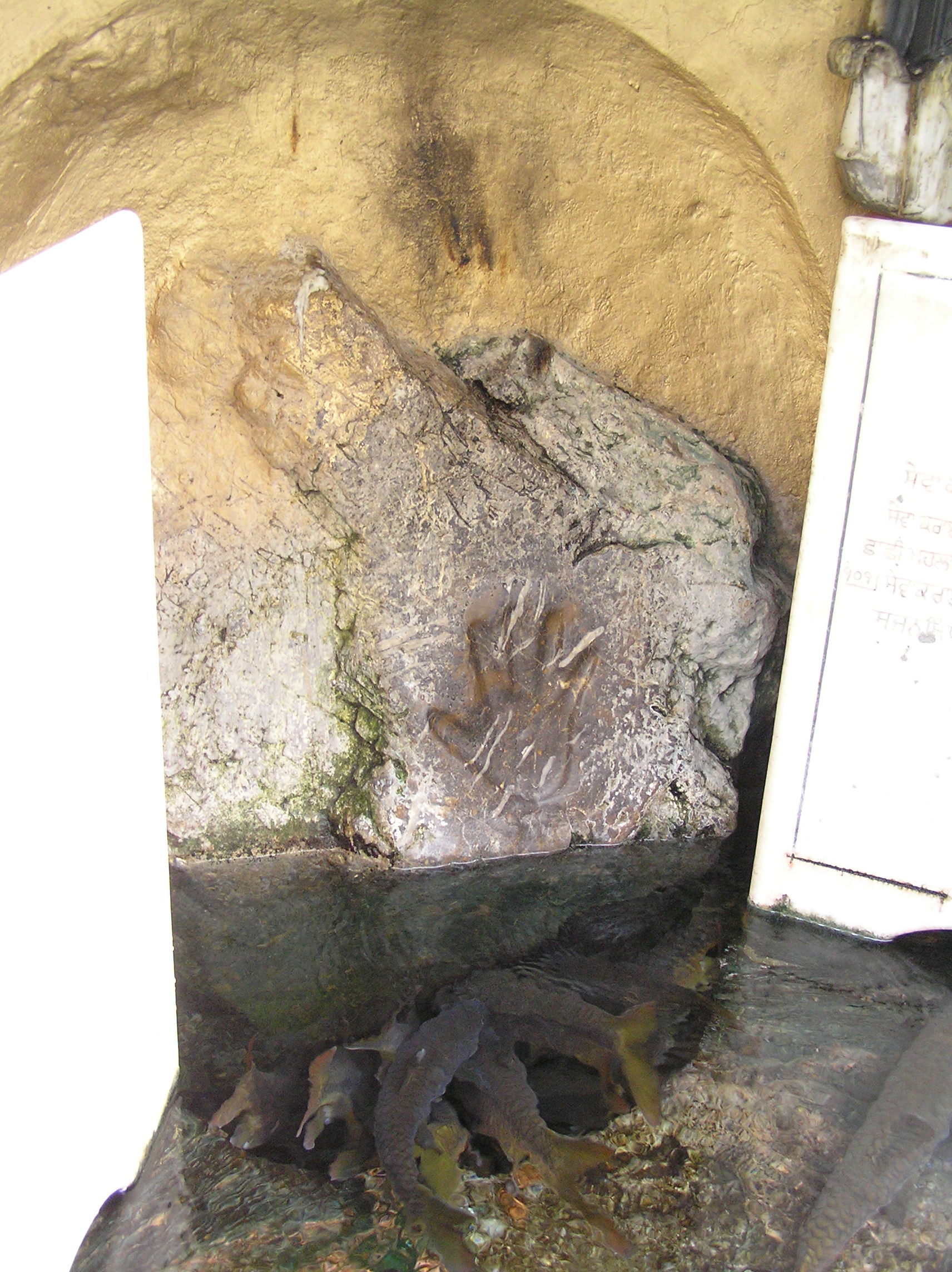
Handprint on the boulder which is believed by Sikhs to be that of Guru Nanak.

Guru Nanak with Bhai Mardana arrived at Hasan Abdal in 1521 during summer season. Upon arrival, Guru Nanak started doing kirtan and a large crowd of devotees gathered where the guru was performing kirtan. Each day, Guru would perform kirtan and a large crowd would gather. This upset Baba Wali Kandhari. On the top of a nearby hill, Wali Kandhari had established a dera where he helped the believers and punished those who did not believe in Islam. There was a spring near his house on the hill. It was the only spring in the area and it was commanded by Wali Kandhari. He blocked the water of the spring from going down to the town. The people begged him as there was now a water shortage. Wali Kandhari told them to ask water from their so-called guru. The people told the guru about the whole matter. Guru Nanak, then, sent Bhai Mardana to fetch water from Wali Kandahari but he refused saying 'Why don't you ask water from the guru you serve?' and Bhai Mardana had to return empty handed. After all of this, Guru Nanak picked up a small stone under his feet and a small trickle of clean water began to flow from the place where the guru lifted the stone and the water which came from the spring of Wali Kandhari started to dry up. This angered Wali Kandhari and he picked up a huge rock and threw it upon Guru Nanak. The rock came rolling from the hill. He had thought that the rock will crush Guru Nanak to death but Guru Nanak raised his hand and the rock stopped when it came in contact with his hand. There is a gurdwara located at the spot where this incident occurred. The gurdwara is known as Panja Sahib.

== Shrine ==
The shrine of Baba Wali Kandhari is located on the banks of Arghandab river. It was constructed by Gul Agha Sherzai. He is known as Baba Saheb by locals.

== Death ==
He died in c. 1529 in a village called Baba Wali in Kandahar. Devotees climb up his hill and make offerings there.
