= Kandahar =

City in Kandahar Province, Afghanistan

Kandahar: کندهار (Pashto); قندهار (Dari)
- Provincial capital
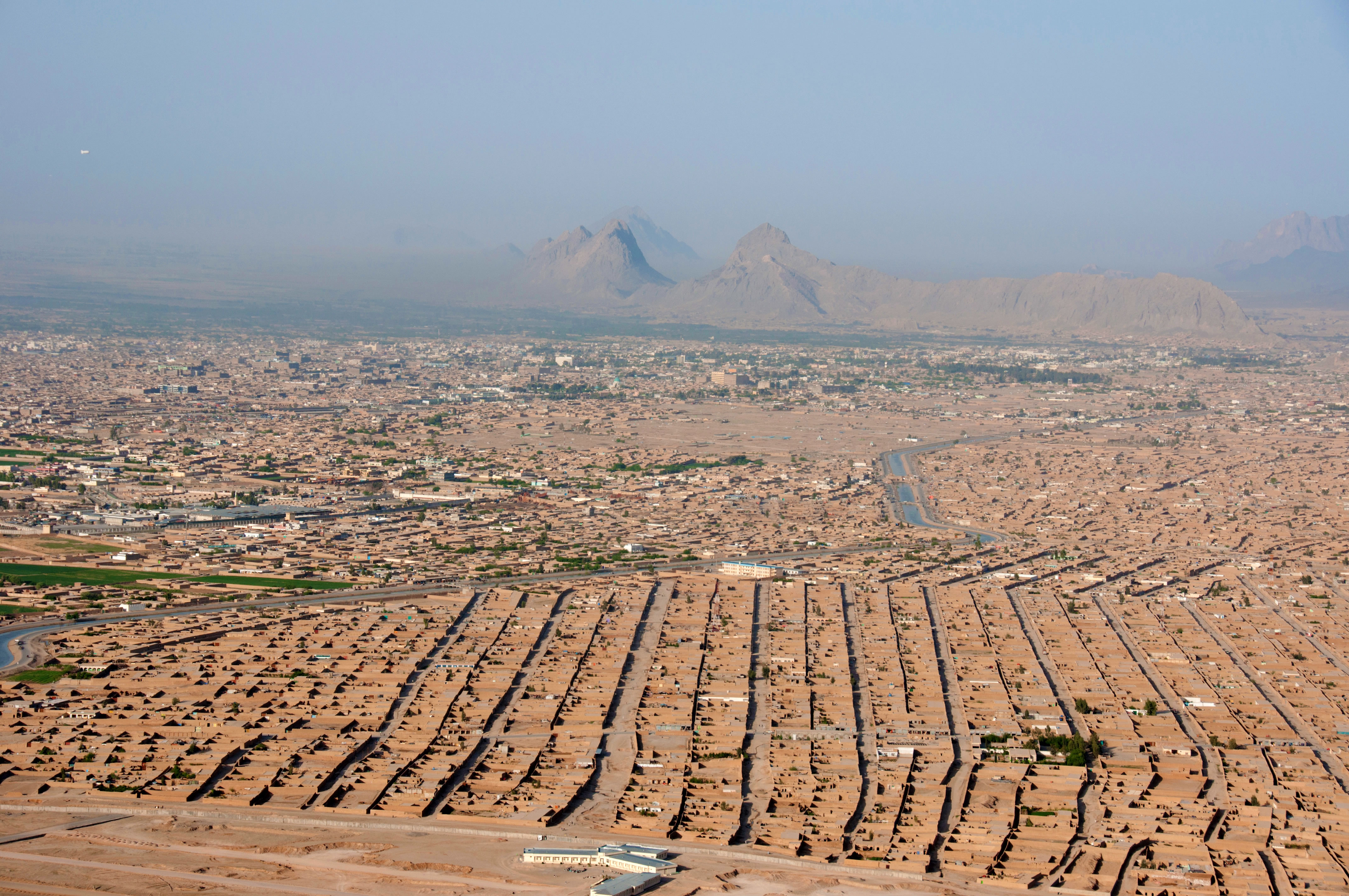
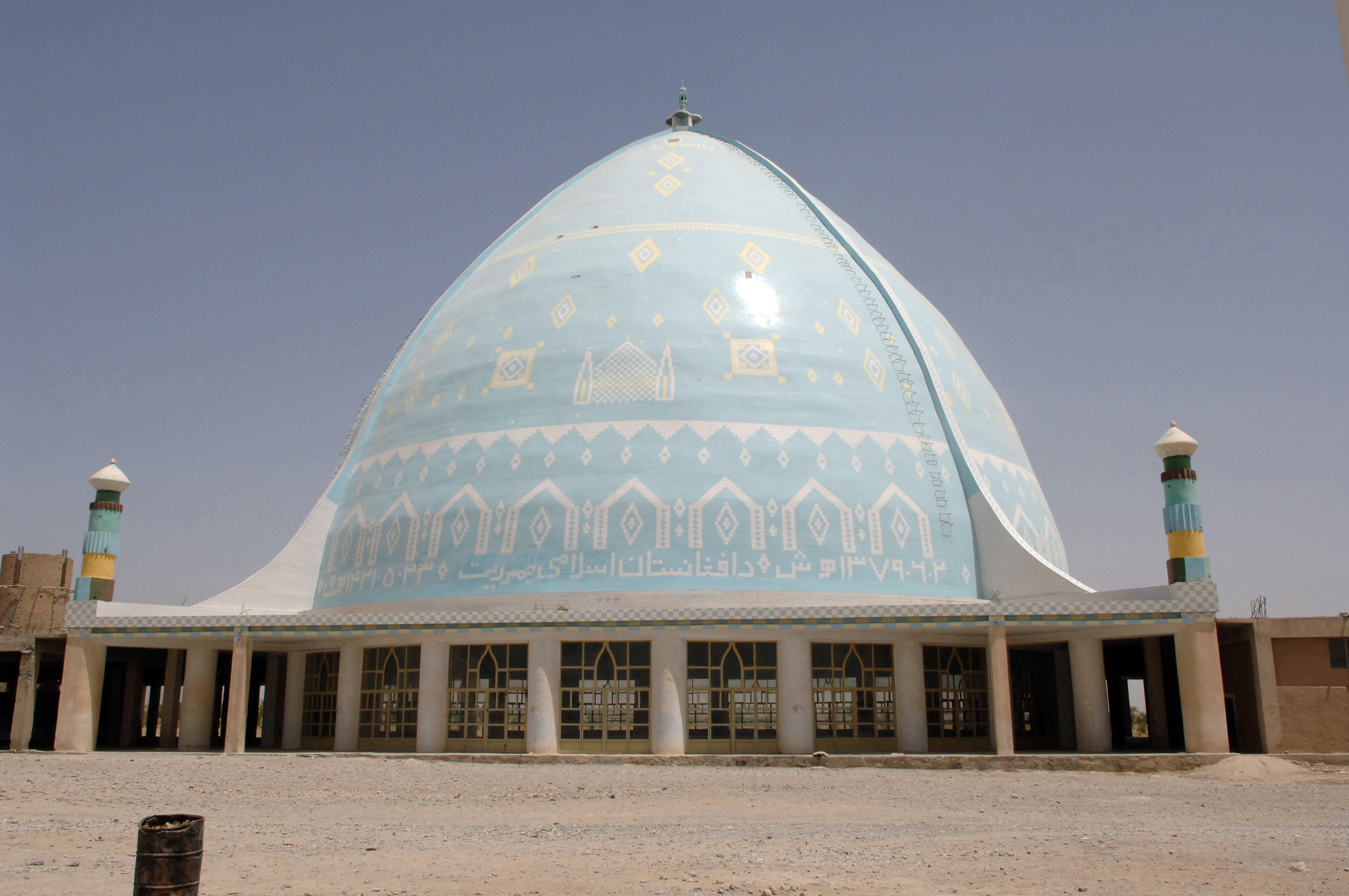
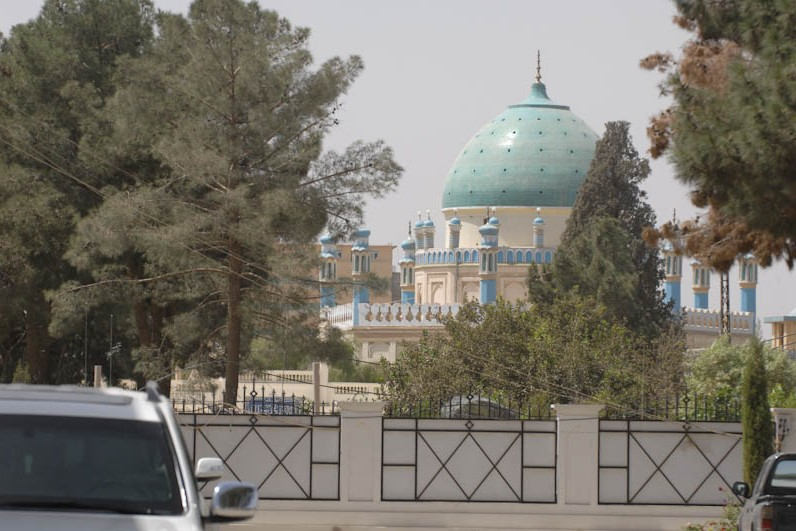
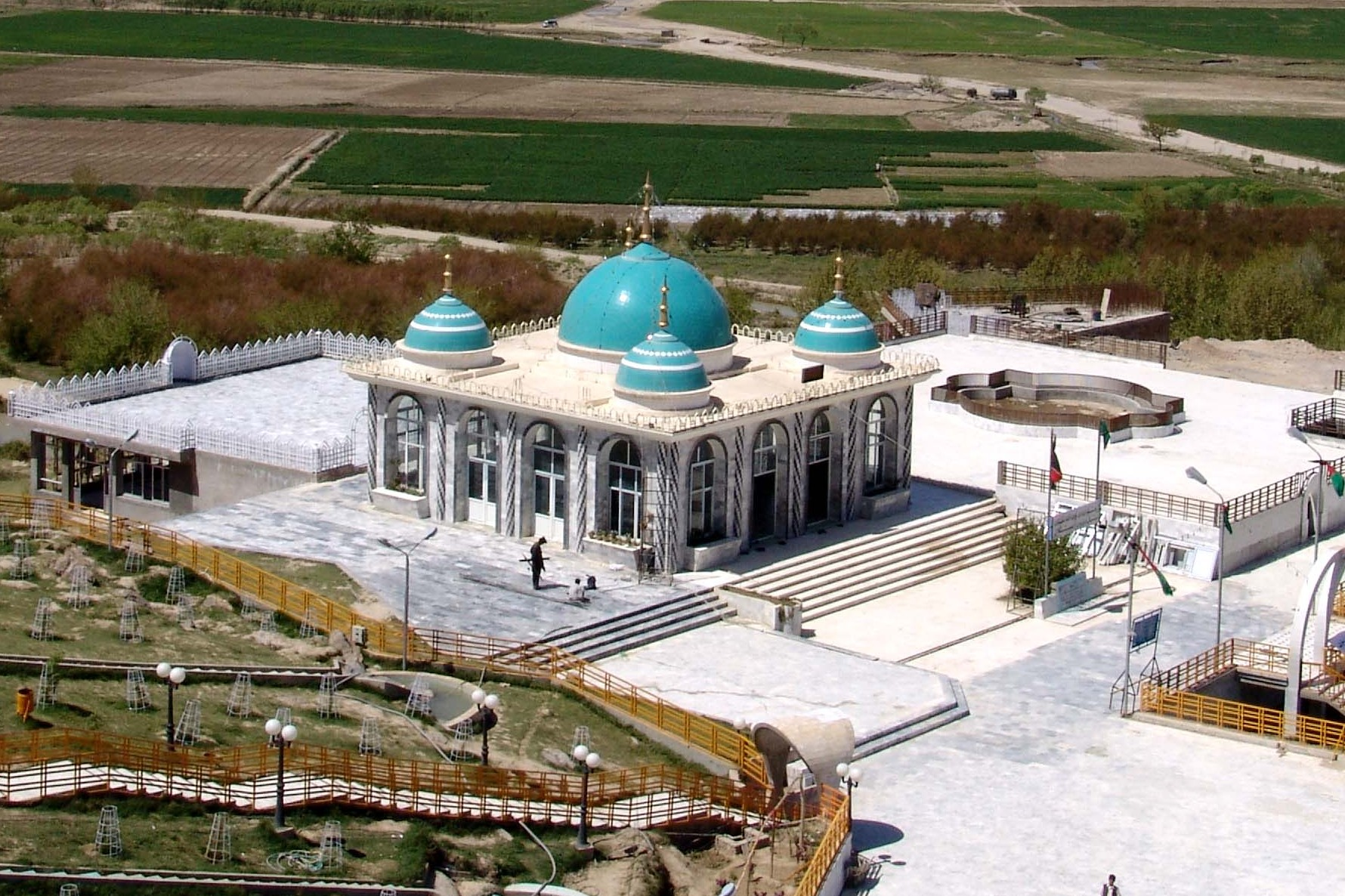
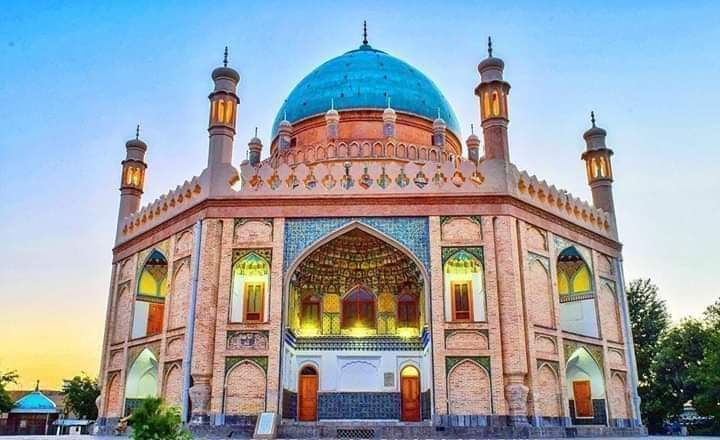
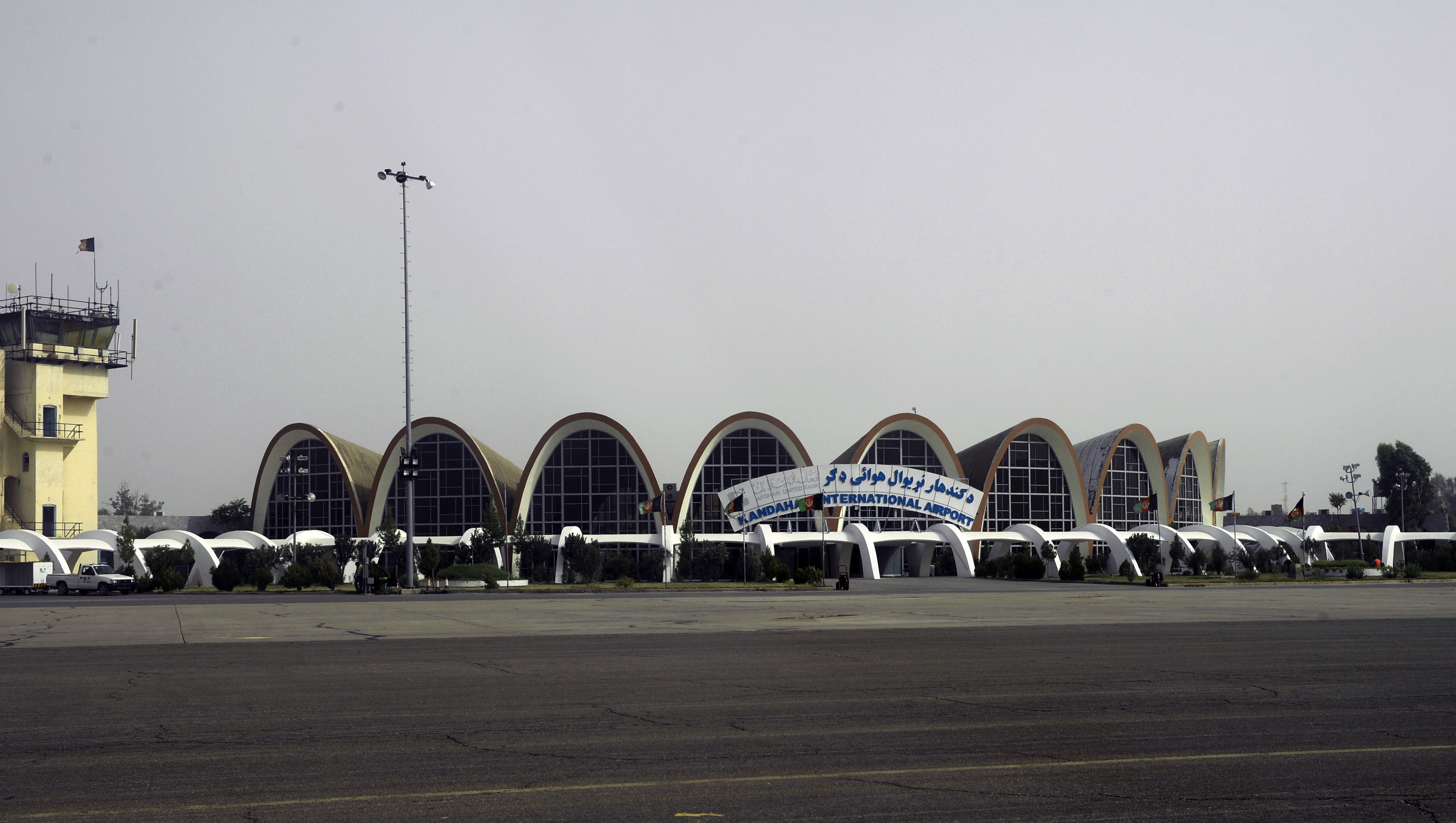
- Top to bottom and left to right: Aerial view of Kandahar, Eidgah Mosque at Kandahar University, Khirka Sharif, Mausoleum of Baba Wali, Mausoleum of Ahmad Shah Durrani, Ahmad Shah Baba International Airport

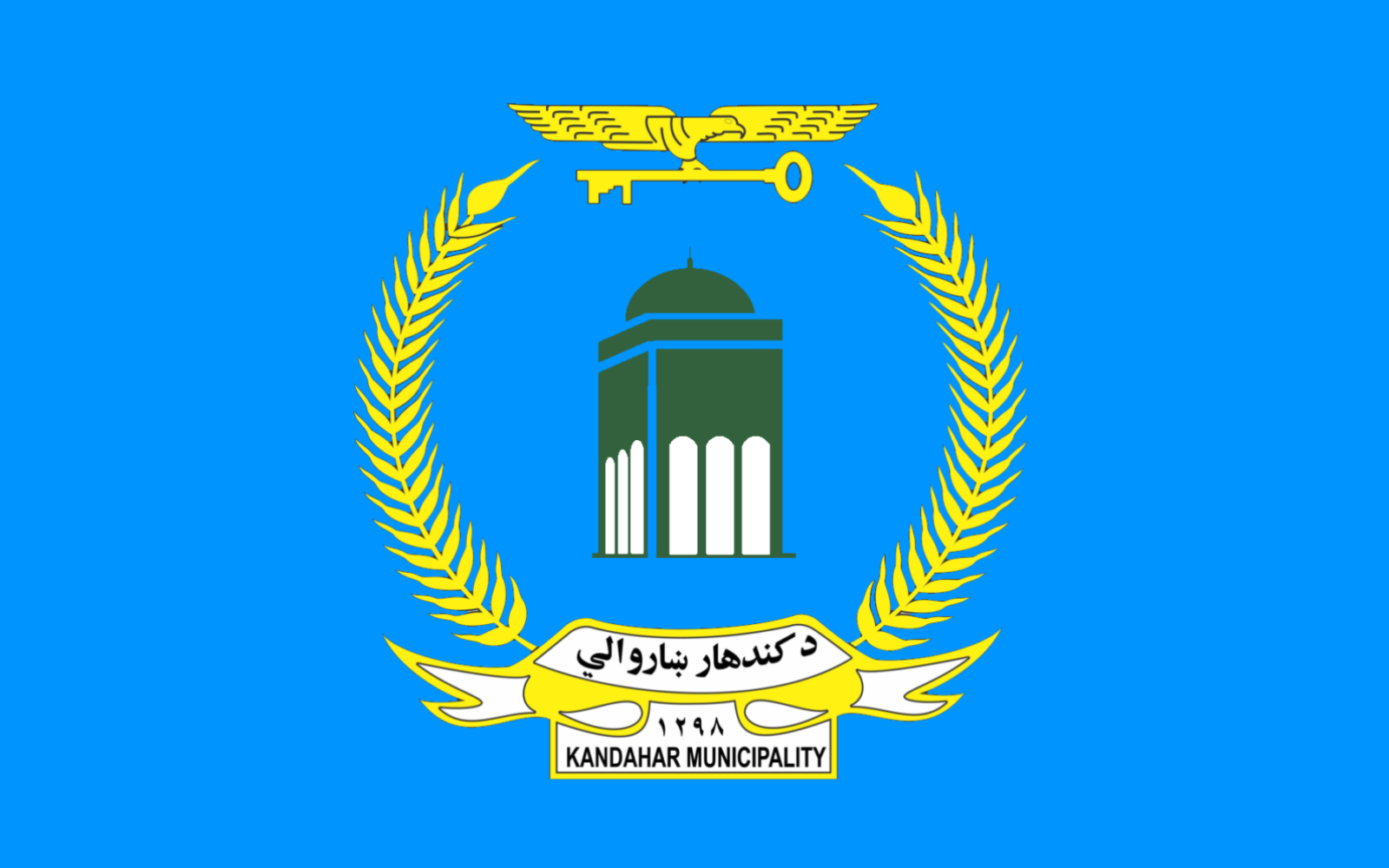
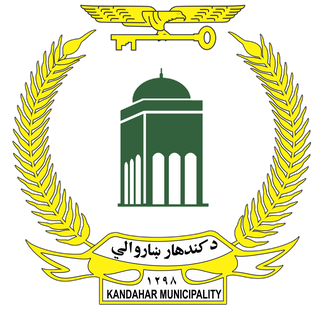
- Flag Seal
- Motto: City of the Power
- Location in Afghanistan Kandahar (West and Central Asia) Kandahar (South Asia) Kandahar (Asia)
- Coordinates: 31°37′12″N 65°42′57″E
- Country: Afghanistan
- Province: Kandahar
- District: Kandahar
- No. of municipal districts (nahias): 15

Government
  - Type: Municipality
  - Mayor: Mullah Hekmatullah

Area
  - Land: 273 km^{2} (105 sq mi)
- Elevation: 1,010 m (3,310 ft)

Population (2025)
  - Provincial capital: 732,629
  - Rank: 2nd
  - Density: 2,680/km^{2} (6,950/sq mi)
  - Urban: 613,462
  - Rural: 119,167
- Demonyms: Kandahari
- Time zone: UTC+04:30 (Afghanistan Time)
- Postal code: 38XX
- ISO 3166 code: AF-KAN
- Website: kandahar-m.gov.af

Kandahar (Note: English: /ˈkændəˌhɑːr/ KAND-ə-HAHR; Pashto: کندهار, romanized: Kandahār, pronounced [kandaˈhɑr, kanˈdɑr]; Dari: قندهار, romanized: Qandahār, pronounced [qandaˈɦɑːɾ, qanˈdɑːɾ]) is a major city in southern Afghanistan, serving as the capital of Kandahar Province. It is within the jurisdiction of Kandahar District and has an estimated population of 732,629 settled residents. Mullah Hekmatullah is the current mayor of the city. His predecessor was Haji Nimatullah Hassan.

Kandahar is located between the Arghandab River and the Tarnak River, at an elevation of approximately 1,010 m (3,310 ft) above sea level. It is the center of the larger cultural region called Loy Kandahar. The Kandahar Municipality is administratively divided into 15 city districts (nahias), covering a land area of 273 km^{2} (105 sq mi). It has a number of industrial parks, public parks, bazaars, business centers, banks, hotels, restaurants, mosques, hospitals, universities, tourist sites, and places to play sports or just relax. The Ayno Maina township is located in the northeastern part of the city, next to the Kabul–Kandahar Highway.

The region around Kandahar is one of the oldest known areas of human settlement. A major fortified city existed at the site of Kandahar, probably as early as c. 1000–750 BC, and it became an important outpost of the Achaemenid Empire in the 6th century BC. Alexander the Great laid the foundation of what is now Old Kandahar (in the southwestern area of the current city) in the 4th century BC and named it Alexandria Arachosia. Many empires have long fought over the city due to its strategic location along the trade routes of southern, central and western Asia. In 1709, Mirwais Hotak turned the region into an independent kingdom and made Kandahar the capital of the Hotak dynasty. In 1747, Ahmad Shah Durrani, founder of the Durrani dynasty, made Kandahar the capital of the Durrani Empire. It was briefly occupied by the British in the 19th century, the Soviets in the 1980s, and recently by NATO forces.

Kandahar is the founding city and spiritual center of the Taliban. Despite the nation's capital being Kabul, where all government ministries and institutions are based, Kandahar is the seat of power in Afghanistan as the supreme leader and his spiritual advisers are based there. Kandahar has therefore been called the de facto capital of Afghanistan, though the Taliban maintain Kabul as the official capital.

Kandahar is one of the most culturally significant cities of the Pashtun community and has been their traditional seat of power for more than 300 years. It is a major industrial and trading center. The region produces some of the finest fruits, especially figs, grapes, pomegranates and mulberries, and the city has plants for canning, drying, and packing fruits.

== Name ==
The origin of the name Kandahar remains a subject of scholarly debate. According to the scholar Warwick Ball, the name of Kandahar is probably derived from that of Gandhara, with C. E. Bosworth stating in the Encyclopedia of Islam that the "name Ḳandahār itself must be connected with Gandhāra". The early Arab writers usually mentioned Gandhara proper as Kandahar or Qandahar due to the absence of the letter 'G' in Arabic. The 10th-century geographer al-Ma'sudi states the name to have been carried from Gandhara proper to what would later be known as modern Kandahar by "the settlement of the Gandharians on the banks of the Arghastan". C. E. Bosworth and John Everett-Heath also suggest that Kandahar gained its name from the settlement of Gandharans in the region.

According to another theory of its name, it is derived from that of the city built here, Alexandria Arachosia by Alexander the Great in 330 BC. The name "Alexander" in the local Pashto language is rendered as "Iskandar". It is believed that over time this transformed into "Scandar", and eventually the modern "Kandahar". The change of the name from "Scandar" to Candar is mentioned by the 16th-century Portuguese historian João de Barros in his work, Décadas da Ásia. The Concise Oxford Dictionary of World Place Names considers suggestion of its derivation from Alexander or Iskandar less plausible, with S. W. Helmes and Warwick Ball rejecting it in favour of derivation from Gandhara.

Ernst Herzfeld claimed Kandahar perpetuated the name of the Indo-Parthian king Gondophares, who re-founded the city under the name Gundopharron. However, modern historians and linguists generally find this derivation implausible. According to Abdur Rahman, the name is usually translated as "the land of fragrance" (from Sanskrit gandha 'fragrance' and -hara 'land').

== History ==
Timeline of Kandahar (Alexandria Arachosia)
Historical affiliations

Macedonia 330 BC–312 BC
Seleucid Empire 312 BC–304 BC
Maurya Empire 304 BC–204 BC
Seleucid Empire 204 BC–c. 180 BC
Greco-Bactrian Kingdom 180 BC – c. 150 BC
Yavana Kingdom c. 150 BC–142 BC
Indo-Scythians 142 BC–32 BC
Parthian Empire 32 BC–19 CE
Indo-Parthian Kingdom 19–36
Kushan Empire 36–230
Sasanian Empire 230–645
Rashidun Caliphate 645–661
Umayyad Caliphate 661–750
Abbasid Caliphate 750–861
Saffarid dynasty 861–977
Ghaznavid Empire 977–1175
Ghurid dynasty 1175–1207
Khwarazmian Empire 1207–1222
Mongol Empire 1222–1256
Ilkhanate 1256–1347
Kart dynasty 1347–1382
Timurid Empire 1382–1507
Mughal Empire 1507–1649
Safavid Empire 1649–1711
Hotak dynasty 1711–1738
Afsharid Empire 1738–1747
Durrani Empire 1747–1818
Principality of Kandahar 1818–1839
United Kingdom (Company Raj) 1839–1842
Principality of Kandahar 1842–1855
Afghanistan 1855–present

=== Prehistory ===
Excavations of prehistoric sites by archaeologists such as Louis Dupree and others suggest that the region around Kandahar is one of the oldest known human settlements known so far.

Early peasant farming villages came into existence in Afghanistan ca. 5000 B.C., or 7000 years ago. Deh Morasi Ghundai, the first prehistoric site to be excavated in Afghanistan, lies 27 km (17 mi) southwest of Kandahar (Dupree, 1951). Another Bronze Age village mound site with multiroomed mud-brick buildings dating from the same period sits nearby at Said Qala (J. Shaffer, 1970). Second millennium B.C. Bronze Age pottery, copper and bronze horse trappings and stone seals were found in the lowermost levels in the nearby cave called Shamshir Ghar (Dupree, 1950). In the Seistan, southwest of these Kandahar sites, two teams of American archaeologists discovered sites relating to the 2nd millennium B.C. (G. Dales, University Museum, University of Pennsylvania, 1969, 1971; W, Trousdale, Smithsonian Institution, 1971 – 76). Stylistically the finds from Deh Morasi and Said Qala tie in with those of pre-Indus Valley sites and with those of comparable age on the Iranian Plateau and in Central Asia, indicating cultural contacts during this very early age.

— N. Dupree, 1971

British excavations in the 1970s discovered that Kandahar existed as a large fortified city during the early 1st millennium BC; while this earliest period at Kandahar has not been precisely dated via radiocarbon, ceramic comparisons with the latest period at the major Bronze Age city of Mundigak have suggested an approximate time-frame of 1000 to 750 BC. This fortified city became an important outpost of the Achaemenid Empire in the 6th to 4th centuries BC, and formed part of the province of Arachosia.

=== Ancient history ===
The main inhabitants of Arachosia were the Pakhtas, an ancient Indo-Aryan tribe, who might have been among the ancestors of modern Pashtuns. Mundigak served as the provincial capital of Arachosia and was ruled by the Medes followed by the Achaemenids until the arrival of the Macedonians. The now-called Old Kandahar was founded in 330 BC by Alexander the Great, near the site of the ancient city of Mundigak (established around 3000 BC era), as Alexandria Arachosia.

Kandahar was a frequent target for conquest because of its strategic location in Asia, controlling the main trade route linking South Asia with West Asia and Central Asia. The territory became part of the Seleucid Empire after the death of Alexander.

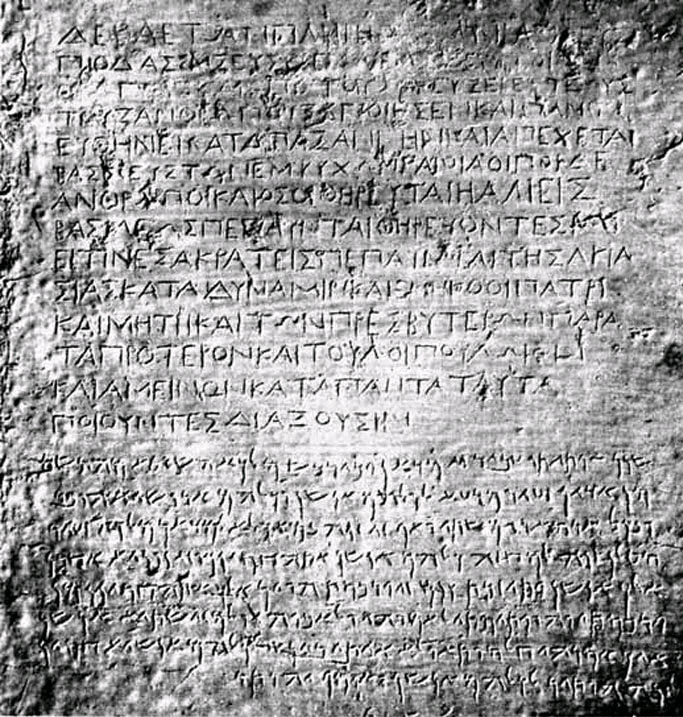
Kandahar Bilingual Rock Inscription (Greek and Aramaic) by Emperor Ashoka, from the Chilzina Complex in Kandahar, 3rd century BC

It is mentioned by Strabo that a treaty of friendship was established eventually between the Greeks and the Mauryas (Indians). While the Diadochi were warring amongst themselves, the Mauryas were expanding in the northern part of Indian subcontinent. The founder of the empire, Chandragupta Maurya, confronted a Macedonian invasion force led by Seleucus I in 305 BC and following a brief conflict, an agreement was reached as Seleucus ceded Gandhara, Arachosia and areas south of Bagram to the Mauryas.

During the Mauryan period, Buddhism was introduced and eventually become one of the major religions alongside Zoroastrianism. Inscriptions made by Emperor Ashoka, a fragment of Edict 13 in Greek, as well as a full Edict, written in both Greek and Aramaic has been discovered in Kandahar. Written in Classical Greek, in this Edict Ashoka used the word Eusebeia ("Piety") as the Greek translation for the ubiquitous "Dharma" of his other Edicts written in Prakrit.

The city eventually became part of the Greco-Bactrian Kingdom (250 BC – 125 BC), and continued that way for two hundred years under the later Indo-Greek Kingdom (180 BC – 10 AD). Hellenistic polities were followed successively by Indo-Scythians, Indo-Parthians, and Kushan; who were in turn followed by a variety of Hunnic kingdoms, notably Nezak Huns, and in the 7th century, by Zunbils.

=== Medieval history ===
Muslim conquest

In the 7th century AD, Arab caliphates initiated the conquest of the region. The leader of the expedition was Abbad ibn Ziyad, who governed Sijistan between 673 and 681. In 870, Yaqub ibn Layth Saffari, a local ruler of the Saffarid dynasty, made Islam the official religion of the area after defeating the Zunbil dynasty, while others claim it was an Eastern Persian realm where the inhabitants practiced Zurvanism.

Ghaznavids

The region fell to the Ghaznavids under Sebüktegin and his son Mahmud of Ghazni in the 10th/11th centuries, followed by Muhammad of Ghor. Kandahar appears to have been renamed Teginābād in the 10th–12th centuries, but the origin of the new name is unclear. During this period, nearby Panjwayi served as the administrative center for the area. However, Kandahar was of much more strategic importance, to the extent that Minhaj-i-Siraj attributes the downfall of the Ghaznavids to the loss of Kandahar. The city's name was changed back to Kandahar by the 13th century, after Ala ad-Din Husayn Jahansuz sacked Lashkari Bazar, near Bost. Again, the reason for the name change is not clear.

Mongols

Kandahar was besieged by a Mongol army in 1221, although Jalal al-Din Mangburni defeated them. In 1251, upon accession to the Mongol throne, Möngke Khan granted Kandahar, along with other lands in Afghanistan, to Shams ad-Din Mohammad Kart of the Kart dynasty. However, the city is mentioned as being under Chagatai control in 1260–61; Kandahar did not come under Kart control until 1281. Later, in 1318, a Chagatai prince raised an army from Kandahar against the Ilkhanid governor of Sistan. Kandahar was described by Ibn Battuta in 1333 as a large and prosperous town three nights journey from Ghazni.

Timur, founder of the Timurid Empire, captured Kandahar in 1383 and later made his grandson Pir Muhammad the governor of the region. Following his death in 1405, the region was ruled by other Timurid governors. Kandahar was entrusted to the Arghuns in the late 15th century, who eventually achieved independence from the Timurids. Guru Nanak, the founder of Sikhism, is believed to have visited the town (c. 1521 AD) during his journey between Hindustan and Mecca in Arabia.

Mughals and Safavids

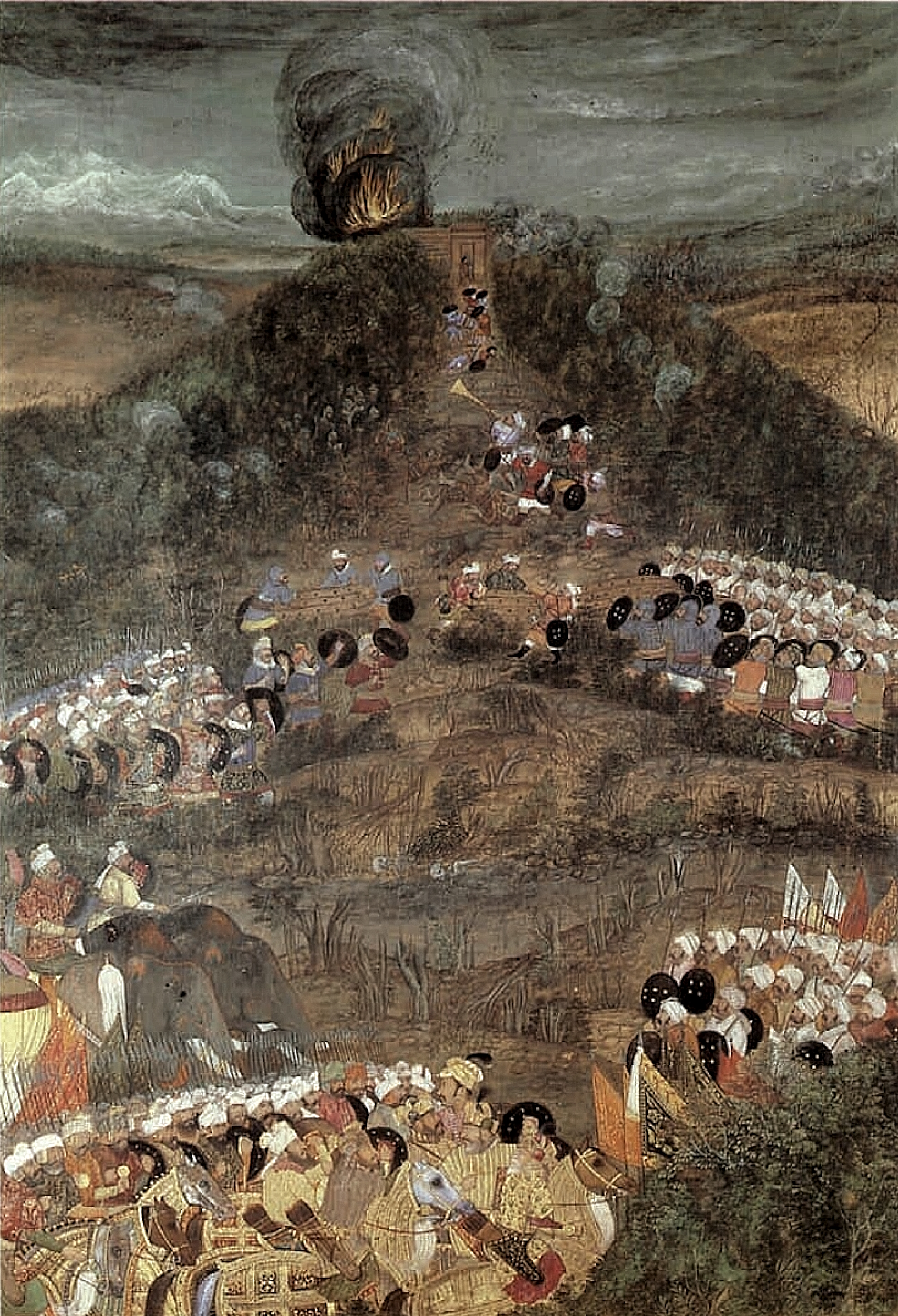
The failed Mughal Siege of Kandahar in 1649. Attributed to Payag. Mughal, mid-17th century. Padshahnama.

Timur's descendant, Babur, the founder of the Mughal Empire, annexed Kandahar in 1508. In 1554, Babur's son, Humayun, handed it over to the Safavid Shah Tahmasp in return of 12,000 soldiers he received from the Shah to reconquer India. In 1595, Humayun's son Akbar the Great took back the city by diplomacy. When news about Akbar's death reached the Persian court, Shah Abbas ordered his army to besiege the city which finally failed due to the reinforcements sent by the Mughal Emperor Jahangir that forced the Safavid retreat. In the siege of 1648–49, Mughal Kandahar, which was being defended by Daulat Khan Mayi, was once again lost when it was captured by the Safavids under Abbas II. Following efforts by Mughals to reclaim it proved unsuccessful. The city was important to Delhi because it was one of the gateways to Hindustan, and Mughal control over Kandahar helped to prevent foreign intrusions. The memory of the wars fought over Kandahar at this time is preserved in the epic poem Qandahār-nāma ("The Campaign Against Qandahār"), a major work of Saib Tabrizi which is a classic of Persian literature.

=== Formation of the current city ===
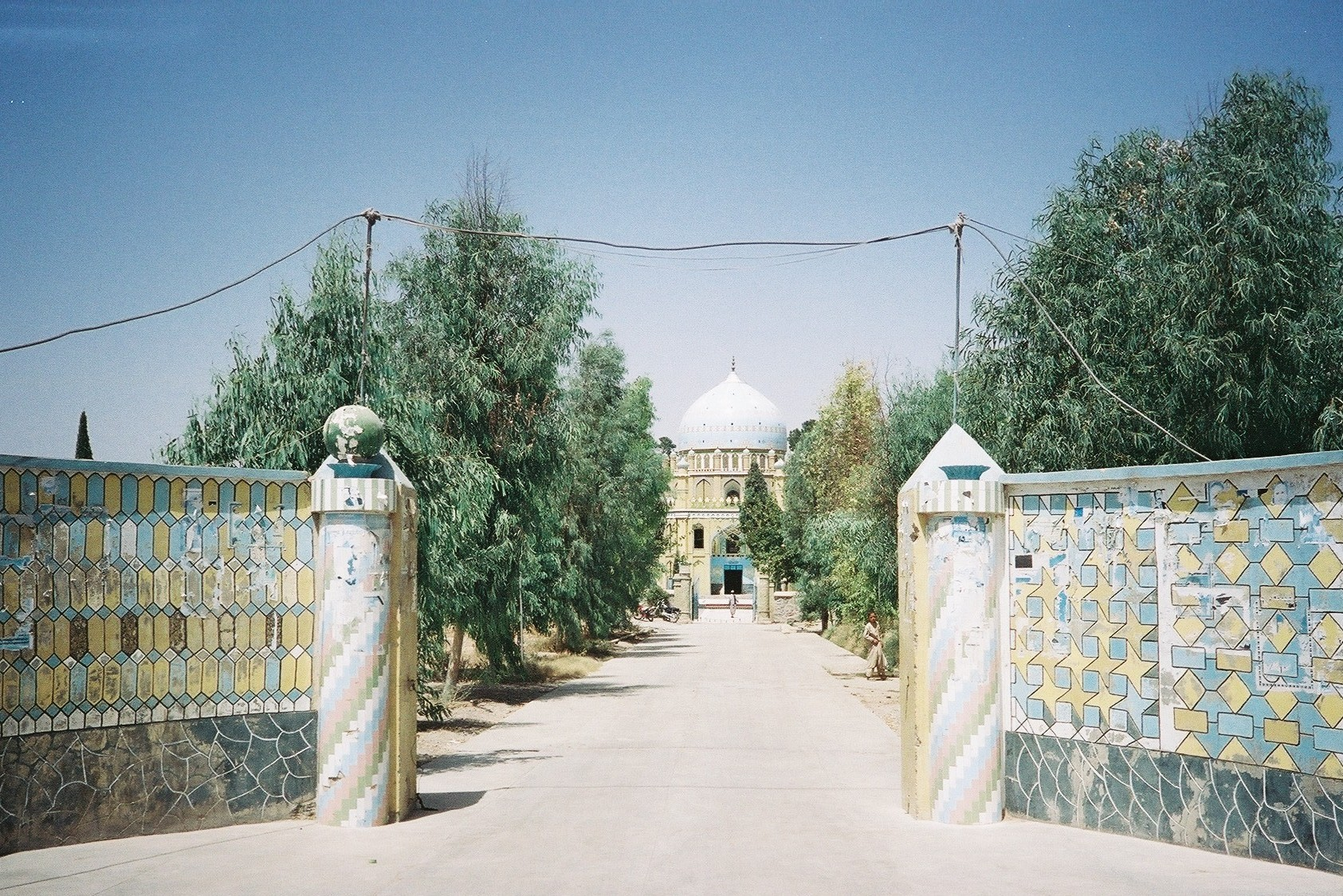
Mausoleum of Mirwais Hotak next to the Kandahar–Herat Highway

Mirwais Hotak, chief of the Ghilji tribe, revolted in 1709 by killing Gurgin Khan, an ethnic Georgian subject and governor of the Shia Safavid Persians. After establishing the Hotak dynasty in Kandahar, Mirwais and his Afghan army successfully defeated subsequent expeditions by Kay Khusraw and Rustam Khan. It has been said that Mirwais resisted attempts by the Persian government who was seeking to convert the people of Kandahar from Sunni to the Shia sect of Islam. He died of a natural death in November 1715 and was succeeded by his brother Abdul Aziz, but after being suspected of giving Kandahar's sovereignty back to the Persians he was killed by his nephew Mahmud Hotak.

In 1722, Mahmud led an army of Afghans to the Safavid capital Isfahan and proclaimed himself King of Persia. The Hotak dynasty was eventually removed from power by a new Persian ruler, Nader Shah. In 1738, Nader Shah invaded Afghanistan and destroyed the now Old Kandahar, which was held by Hussain Hotak and his Ghilji tribes. In the same year, Nader Shah freed Ahmad Khan (later Ahmad Shah Durrani) and his brother Zulfikar who were held as political prisoners by the Hotak ruler. Before leaving southern Afghanistan for Delhi in Hindustan, Nader Shah laid out the foundation for a new town to be built next to the destroyed ancient city, naming it "Naderabad". His rule ended in June 1747 after being murdered by his Persian guards.

This lithograph is taken from plate 23 of Afghaunistan by Lieutenant James Rattray, 1848. He sketched Kandahar in December 1841 from the rooftop of the former residence of the province's governor, Sirdar Meer Dil Khaun, who was brother to the Emir. Pictured on the left is the Mausoleum of Ahmad Shah Durrani and on the right the Bala Hissar (fort) and citadel.

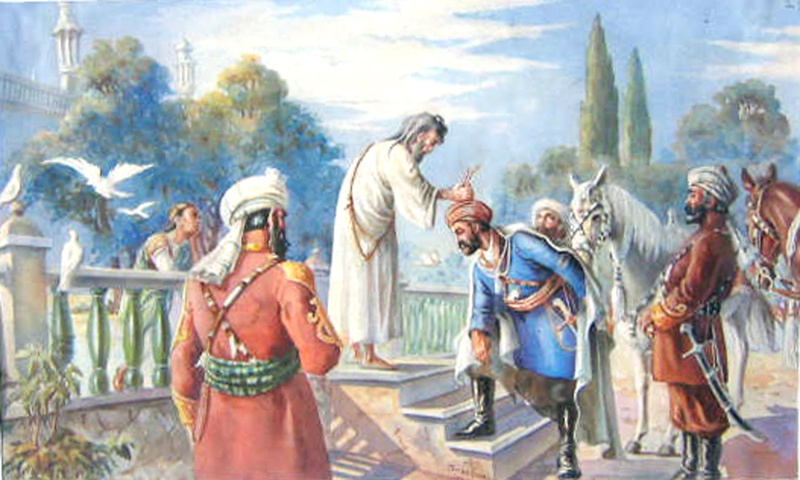
Painting by Abdul Ghafoor Breshna depicting Sabir Shah's October 1747 coronation of Ahmad Shah Durrani, who is regarded as the founding father of Afghanistan (Father of the Nation)

Ahmad Shah Durrani, chief of the Durrani tribe, gained control of Kandahar and made it the capital of his new Afghan Empire in October 1747. Initially, Ahmad Shah had trouble finding land on which to build his city. His own tribe had no extensive lands and others who had, such as the Alikozai and Barakzai, refused to give up their lands. Only the Popalzai finally offered him his pick of their lands. The foundations for the city were laid in June 1761. Once begun, the city was built with grand proportions. It was laid out in the form of a regular rectangle with a circumference of three miles; walls 30 feet thick at the bottom and 15 feet at the top, rose 27 feet high to enclose it. Outside, the walls were ringed by a moat 24 feet wide. Six mammoth gateways pierced these walls: the Eid Gah Gate on the north, the Shikarpur Gate on the south; the Herat and Top Khana Gates on the west; and, the Bar Durrani and Kabul Gates on the east. At its peak, Ahmad Shah's empire included present-day Afghanistan, Pakistan, the Khorasan and Kohistan provinces of Iran, along with Punjab in India. In October 1772, Ahmad Shah retired and died from a natural cause. A new city was laid out by Ahmad Shah and is dominated by his mausoleum, which is adjacent to the Mosque of the Cloak in the centre of the city. By 1776, his eldest son Timur Shah had transferred Afghanistan's main capital, due to several conflicts with various Pashtun tribes, from Kandahar to Kabul, where the Durrani legacy continued.

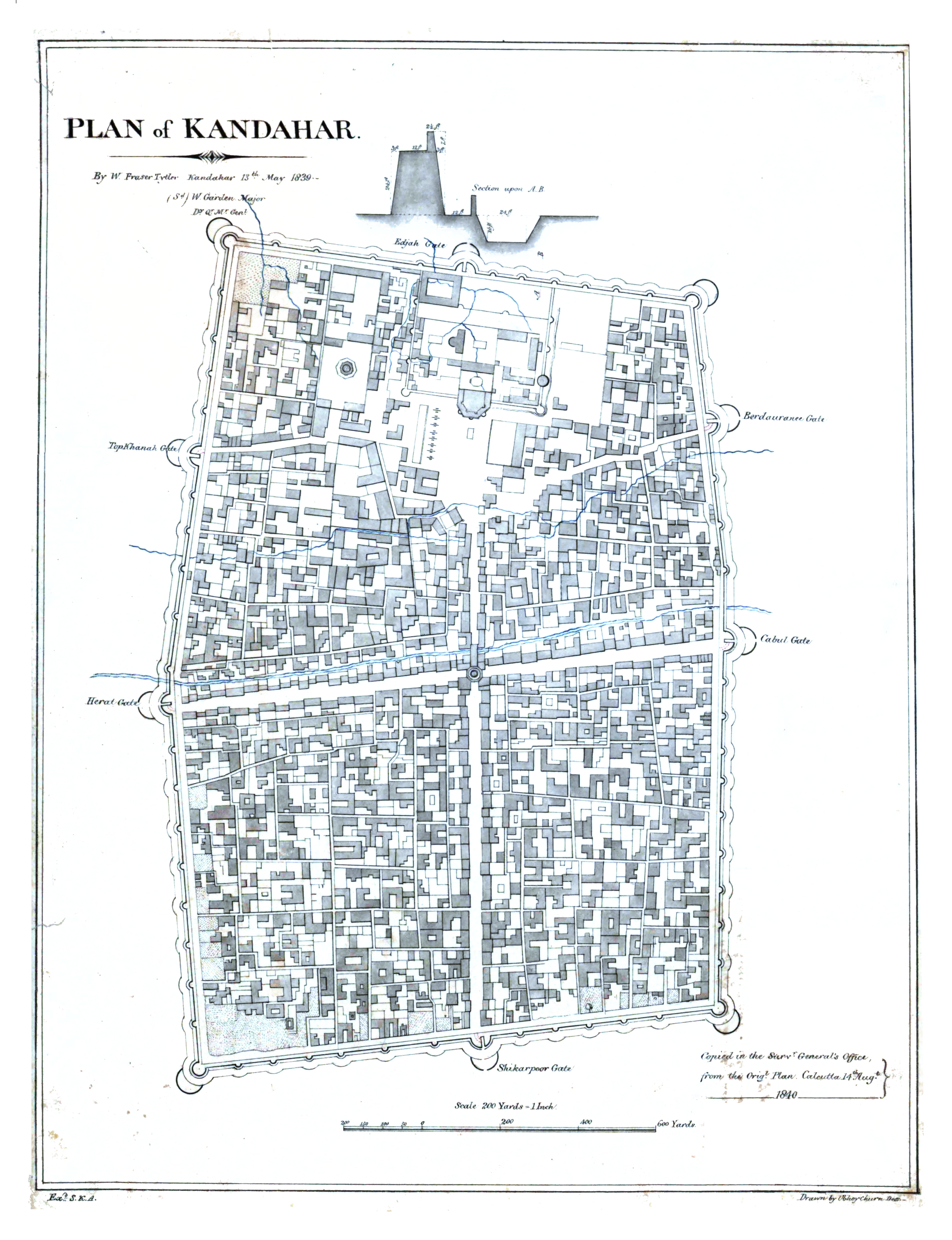
1839 map of Kandahar

From 1818 to 1855, Kandahar was ruled by half-brothers of Dost Mohammad Khan as an independent principality. In September 1826, Syed Ahmad Shaheed's followers arrived to Kandahar in search of volunteers to help them wage jihad against the Sikh invaders to what is now Pakistan. Led by Ranjit Singh, the Sikhs had captured several of Afghanistan's eastern territories, including parts of what is now Khyber Pakhtunkhwa and Kashmir. More than 400 local Kandahar warriors assembled themselves for the jihad. Sayed Din Mohammad Kandharai was appointed as their leader.

==== British invasions and withdrawals ====
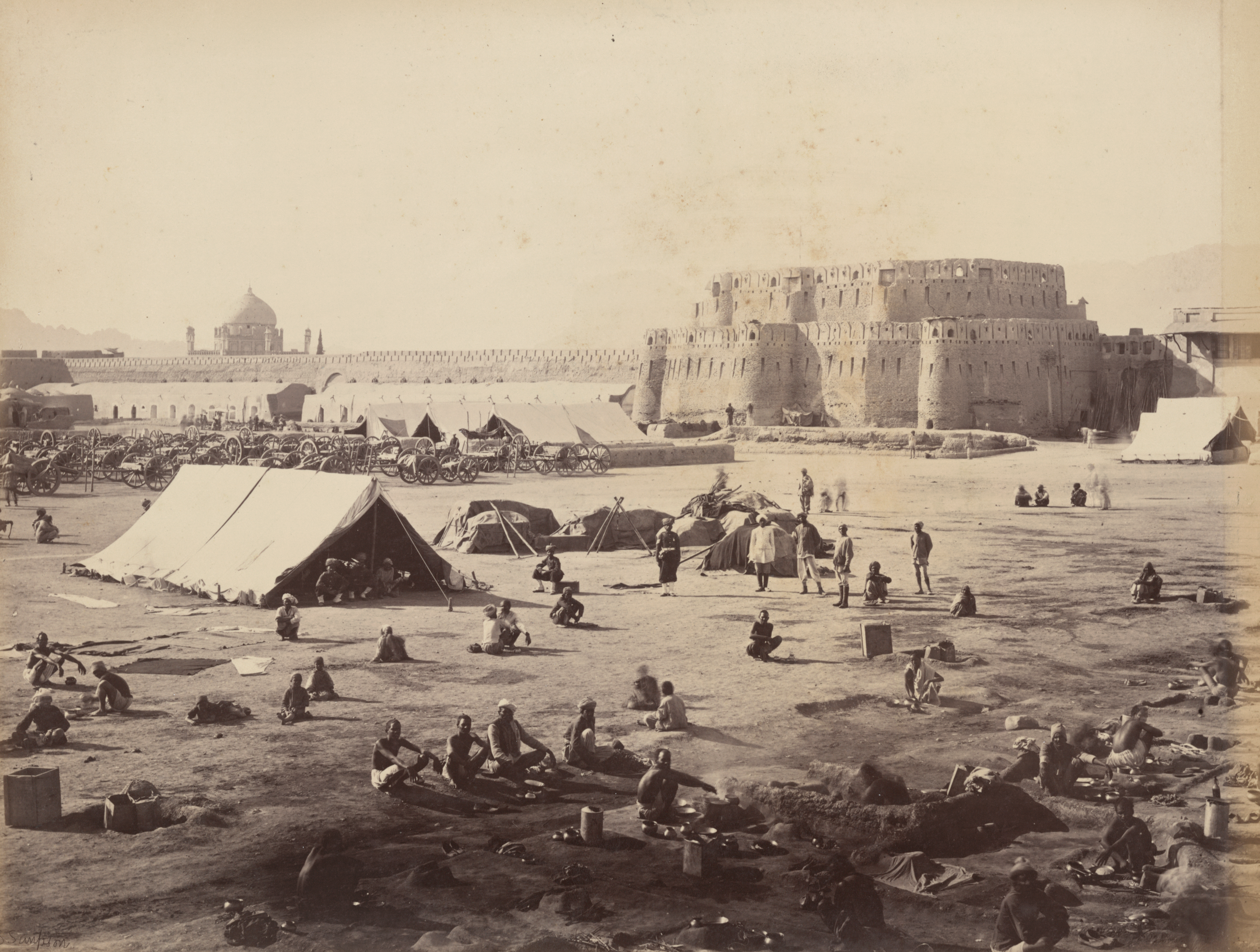
British-Indian invading forces taking refuge at Kandahar after their defeat in the July 1880 Battle of Maiwand, during the Second Anglo-Afghan War. The large defensive wall around the city was removed in the early 1930s by the order of King Nader Khan, the father of King Zahir Shah.

British-led Indian forces from neighboring British India invaded the city in 1839, during the First Anglo-Afghan War, but withdrew in 1842. In November 1855, Dost Mohammad Khan took control of Kandahar. The British-led Indian forces (under LTG Stewart) returned in January of 1879 during the Second Anglo-Afghan War. They emerged from Chaman to confront the forces of Ayub Khan, but were defeated at the Battle of Maiwand in July 1880. They were again forced to withdraw several months later, despite winning the Battle of Kandahar.

Kandahar remained peaceful for the next 100 years, except during 1929 when loyalists of Habibullah Kalakani placed the fortified city on lock-down and began oppressing its population. Nobody was allowed to enter or leave from within the city's tall defensive walls, and as a result of this many people suffered after running out of food supplies. This lasted until October 1929 when Nadir Khan and his Afghan army came to eliminate Kalakani, known as the Tajik bandit from the village of Kalakan in Kabul Province.

During the Kingdom of Mohammad Zahir Shah, the city slowly began expanding by adding modern style streets and housing schemes. Although Kandahar remained less international than Kabul, with fewer foreigners in residence and thus no market for coffee, jam or other European products, a modest German community took root there in the 1930s. Engineers and factory managers, accompanied by their spouses, arrived to supervise wool-processing plants. Some American families began arriving to Kandahar in the 1950s. A Siemens electrical station powered these emerging industries, signaling a step toward the broader modernization taking shape across Afghanistan during this period.

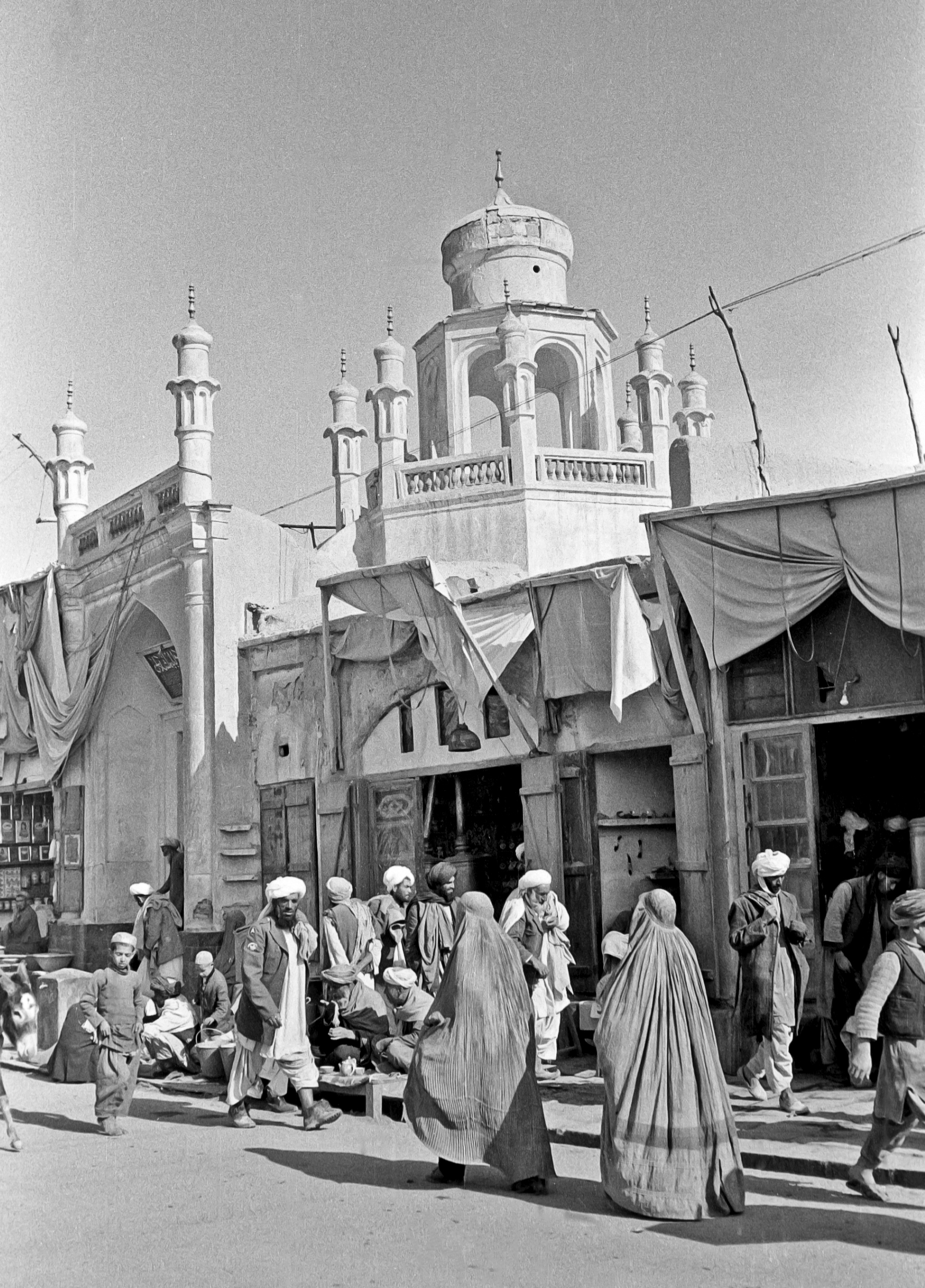
Street scene in the historical part of the city, 1973

In the 1960s, during the rivalry between the United States and the Soviet Union, the United States built the Kandahar International Airport. The U.S. also completed several other major projects in Kandahar and in other parts of southern Afghanistan. In the meantime, Soviet engineers were busy building major infrastructures in other parts of the country, such as Bagram Airfield and Kabul International Airport. Kandahar had become a major stop on the Hippie trail from Herat to Kabul. In 1972 the city was in shock after four citizens of France were kidnapped and brutally murdered by local criminals, who were later publicly hanged in front of the victims' family after confessing to their crimes.

==== Soviet invasion and withdrawal ====
During the 1980s Soviet–Afghan War, Kandahar witnessed heavy fighting between the Afghan mujahideen and the Democratic Republic of Afghanistan. Soviet troops surrounded the city and subjected it to heavy air bombardment in which many civilians were killed. In January 1982 indiscriminate shelling and bombing by the Soviets killed hundreds. 300 civilians were killed during Soviet bombings in July 1984. It was under siege again in April 1986. The city's population was reduced from 200,000 before the war to no more than 25,000 residents in 1987. Most have fled to neighboring Pakistan and Iran.

Kandahar underwent a complete sociopolitical collapse in the early 1990s, driven in part by the divide-and-rule tactics of the communist governor-general, Nur ul-Haq Ulumi, who manipulated rival mujahideen factions against each other, and by the rampant greed within both the communist and mujahideen militias. After the Soviet withdrawal and the collapse of Mohammad Najibullah's government in 1992, Kandahar fell to local mujahideen commander, Gul Agha Sherzai. However Sherzai lacked authority against other local commanders which led to lawlessness in the city, and fighting in 1993. During this time, banditry, rape, and murder became rampant in Kandahar, creating a demand for a more moral and unified alternative. This led to the rise of the talibs (students), who eventually formed the Taliban movement. By the spring of 1994, the nucleus of the Taliban emirate had begun to take shape, and that year, they launched operations to dismantle warlord militia checkpoints around the city. The talibs gained considerable popularity and legitimacy during this period by defeating these predatory warlords.

In August 1994, Mullah Omar and his Taliban forces turned the city into their headquarters after Mullah Naqib and his forces surrendered. The capture of Afghanistan's second-largest city marked the Taliban's transformation from a fledgling militia into an Islamic emirate, solidifying their legitimacy as a governing authority through the imposition of a strict interpretation of Islamic law. Formal education for girls was banned as well as the consumption of TV, films, music with instrumental accompaniments, and the playing of sports. In December 1999, a hijacked Indian Airlines Flight 814 plane by Pakistani militants loyal to Harkat-ul-Mujahideen landed at Kandahar International Airport and kept the passengers hostage as part of a demand to release three Pakistani militants from prison in India.

==== NATO invasion and withdrawal ====
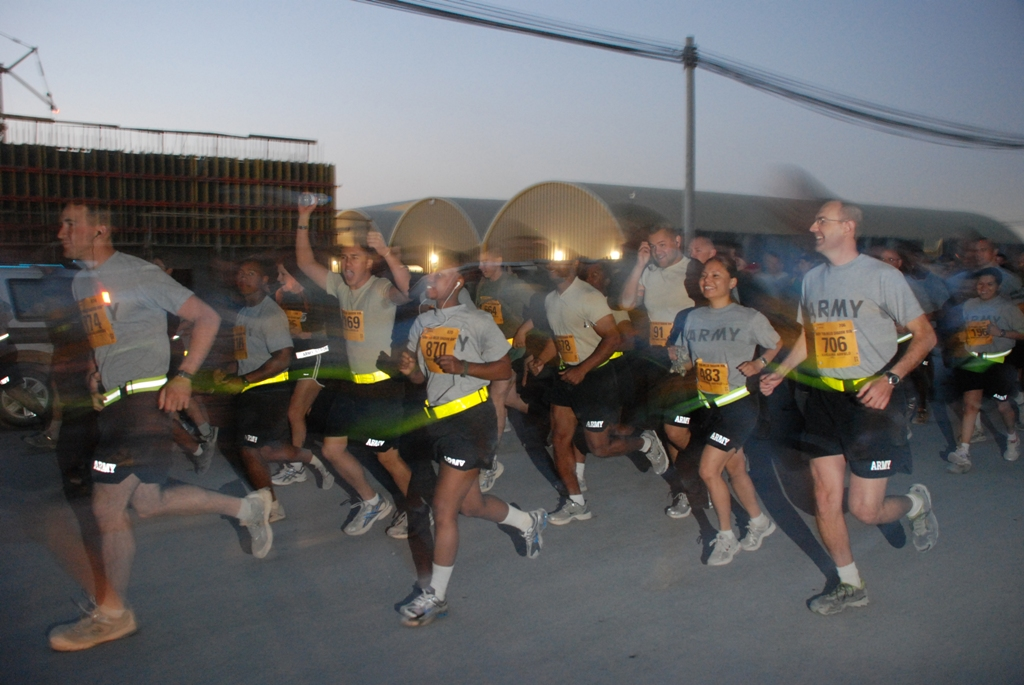
U.S. Army troops in 2009 passing by the starting point of the Army Ten-Miler run at their base next to Kandahar International Airport

In October 2001, as part of Operation Enduring Freedom, the United States Navy began hitting targets inside the city by precision-guided cruise missiles that were fired from the Persian Gulf. These targets were the Kandahar International Airport and buildings that were occupied by the Taliban, including Arab families who had arrived several years earlier and were residing in the area. About a month later, the Taliban began surrendering in mass numbers to a private militia that had been formed by Gul Agha Sherzai and Hamid Karzai. Kandahar once again fell into the hands of Sherzai, who had control over the area before the rise of the Taliban. He was transferred to Nangarhar Province in 2003 and replaced by Yousef Pashtun until Asadullah Khalid took the post in 2005.

In 2002, members of the United States armed forces took control of the Kandahar International Airport. Years later NATO's International Security Assistance Force (ISAF) began training members of the new Afghan National Security Forces and provided security for the city. The military of Afghanistan, backed by ISAF, gradually expanded its authority and presence throughout most of the country. The 205th Corps of the Afghan National Army was based at Kandahar and provided military assistance to the south of the country. The Canadian Armed Forces maintained their military command headquarters at Kandahar, heading the Regional Command South of ISAF in Kandahar Province. The Taliban also had supporters inside the city reporting on events.

ISAF gradually expanded the Afghan police force as part of a larger effort that also aimed to deliver services such as electricity and clean drinking water. The most significant battle between ISAF and the Taliban lasted throughout the summer of 2006, culminating in Operation Medusa. The Taliban failed to defeat the Western troops in open warfare, which marked a turn in their tactics towards IED emplacement. In June 2008, it was reported that over 1,000 inmates had escaped from Sarposa prison. In Spring 2010, the province and the city of Kandahar became a target of American operations following Operation Moshtarak in the neighbouring Helmand Province. In March 2010, U.S. and NATO commanders released details of plans for the biggest offensive of the war against the Taliban insurgency.

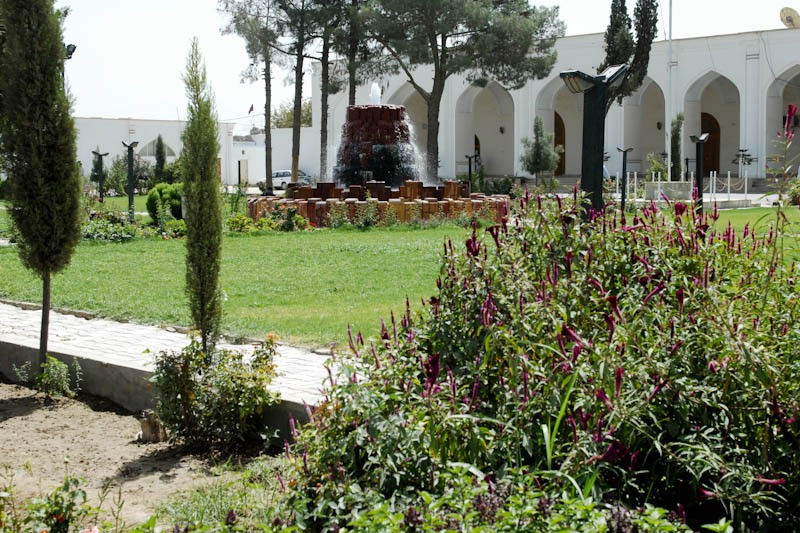
The Governor's Complex in the center of the city, across from Khirka Sharif

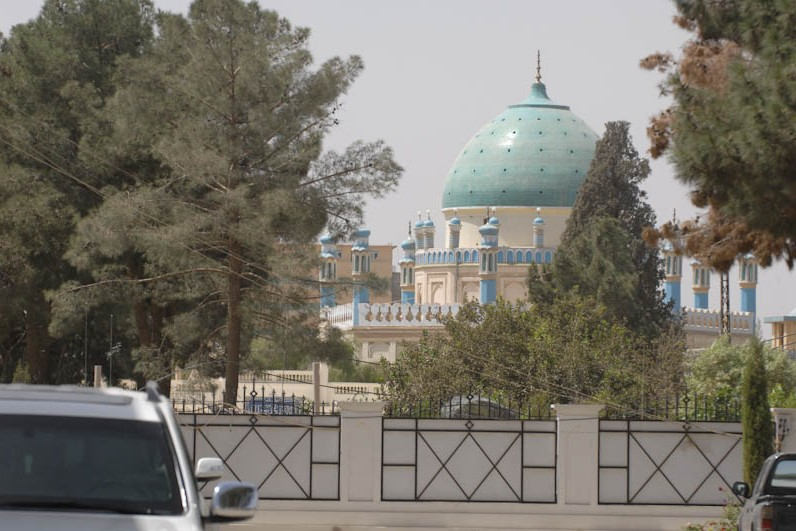
Mausoleum of Ahmad Shah Durrani, next to Khirka Sharif

In May 2010, Kandahar International Airport became subject of a combined rocket and ground attack by insurgents, following similar attacks on Kabul and Bagram in the preceding weeks. Although this attack did not lead to many casualties on the side of ISAF, it did show that the militants were still capable of launching multiple, coordinated operations in Afghanistan. In June 2010, a shura was held by then-Afghan President Hamid Karzai with tribal and religious leaders of the Kandahar region. The meeting highlighted the need for support of NATO-led forces in order to stabilize parts of the province.

In July 2011 Ahmad Wali Karzai, brother of President Hamid Karzai, was killed by one of his close bodyguards. The next day the mullah of the famous Red Mosque and a number of other people were killed by a Taliban suicide bomber who had hidden explosives inside his turban. On 27 July 2011, the mayor of the city, Ghulam Haider Hamidi, was assassinated by another Taliban militant who had hidden explosives in his turban. Two deputy mayors had been killed in 2010, while many tribal elders and Islamic clerics have also been assassinated in the last several years. The overwhelming majority of the victims in the attacks were ordinary civilians. On 6 June 2012, at least 21 civilians were killed and 50 others injured when two Taliban suicide bombers on motorcycles blew themselves up in a market area near Kandahar International Airport.

On 4 May 2020, a policewoman was assassinated in the centre of Kandahar, making her the fifth policewoman to be killed during the previous two months in Kandahar. No group claimed responsibility for the killing of the policewomen by the end of the day of the reported event.

On or about 12 August 2021, the Taliban recaptured Kandahar. After days of fighting the NATO-trained Afghan National Army retreated from the city. It became the twelfth provincial capital to be retaken as part of the wider 2021 Taliban offensive. On 15 October 2021, four suicide bombers killed dozens at a Shia mosque in the city.

== Geography ==
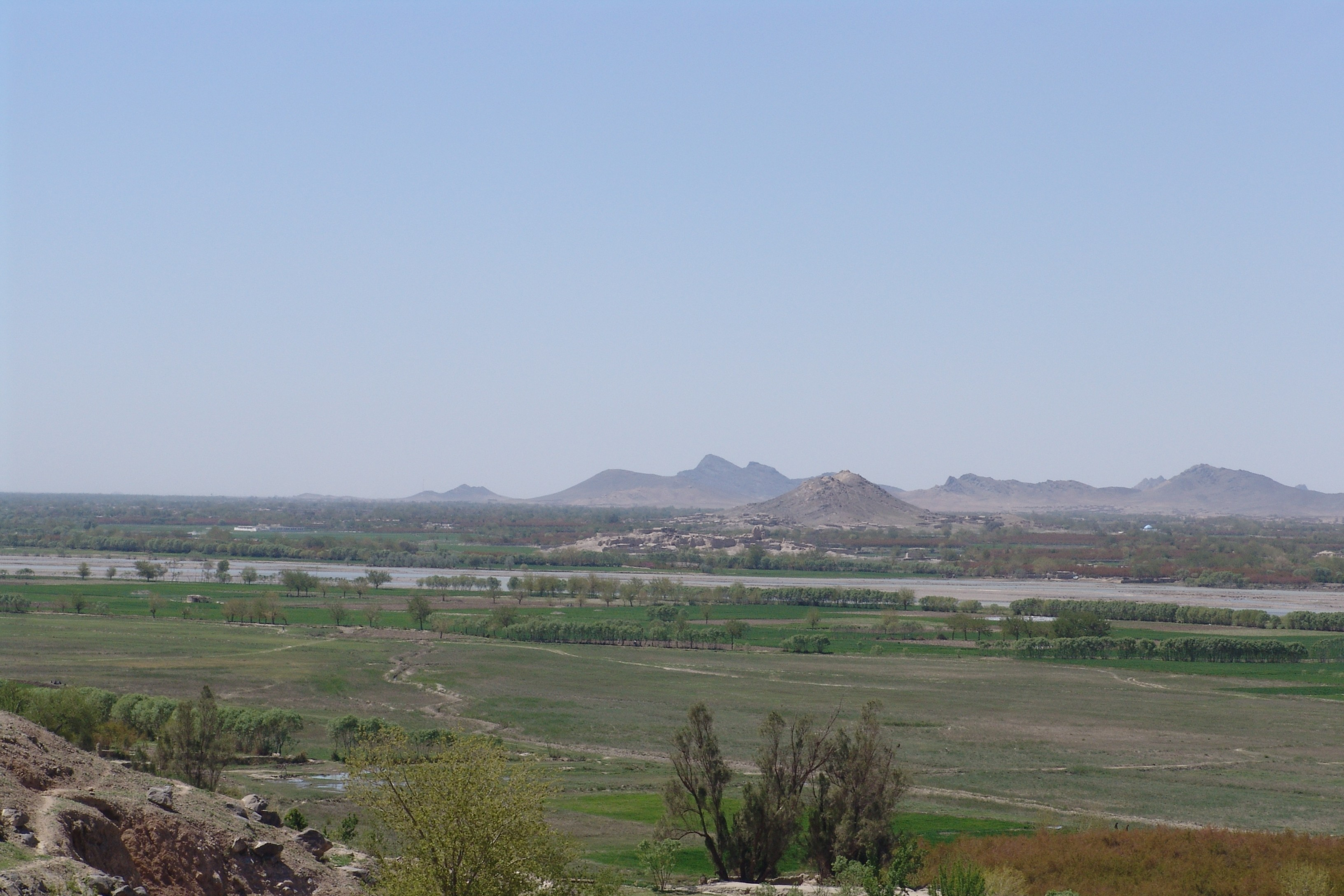
Arghandab Valley

Kandahar is in southern Afghanistan, connecting South Asia with Central Asia and Western Asia with Eastern Asia. It is between the Arghandab River and the Tarnak River, and has 15 city districts (nahias), covering a land area of 273 km^{2} (105 sq mi) or 27,337 ha (67,550 acres).

Kandahar is connected by a road network with Tarinkot to the north, Qalat to the northeast, Spin Boldak to the southeast, and Grishk and Lashkargah to the west. It is the regional hub in southern Afghanistan, approximately 113 km (70 mi) from the Afghanistan–Pakistan Friendship Gate near the Durand Line. Non-built up land use accounts for 59% of the total land area. Within the built-up area, vacant plots occupy a slightly higher percentage of land (36%) than residential land (34%). There is a significant commercial cluster along the road to Pakistan in District 5. In 2015 there were 61,902 dwelling units in the city.

=== Climate ===
Kandahar has a hot semi-arid climate (Köppen BSh), that borders on a hot desert climate (BWh), characterised by little precipitation and high variation between summer and winter temperatures. Summers start in mid-May, last until late September, and are extremely dry. Temperatures peak in July with a 24-hour daily average of around 31.9 °C (89.4 °F). They are followed by dry autumns from early October to late November, with days still averaging in the 20s °C (above 68 °F) into November, although nights are sharply cooler. Winter begins in December and sees most of its precipitation in the form of rain. Temperatures average 5.1 °C (41.2 °F) in January, although lows can drop well below freezing. They end in early March and are followed by a pleasant spring until late April with temperatures generally in the upper 10s °C to lower 30s °C (65–88 °F) range. Sunny weather dominates year-round, especially in summer, when rainfall is extremely rare. The annual mean temperature is 18.6 °C (65.5 °F).

Climate data for Kandahar (1964–1983)
Month	Jan	Feb	Mar	Apr	May	Jun	Jul	Aug	Sep	Oct	Nov	Dec	Year
Record high °C (°F)	25.0 (77.0)	26.0 (78.8)	36.5 (97.7)	37.1 (98.8)	43.0 (109.4)	45.0 (113.0)	46.5 (115.7)	44.5 (112.1)	41.0 (105.8)	37.5 (99.5)	31.5 (88.7)	26.0 (78.8)	46.5 (115.7)
Mean daily maximum °C (°F)	12.2 (54.0)	14.8 (58.6)	21.6 (70.9)	28.1 (82.6)	34.1 (93.4)	39.1 (102.4)	40.2 (104.4)	38.2 (100.8)	34.0 (93.2)	27.5 (81.5)	21.0 (69.8)	15.4 (59.7)	27.2 (81.0)
Daily mean °C (°F)	5.1 (41.2)	7.8 (46.0)	13.9 (57.0)	20.2 (68.4)	25.4 (77.7)	30.0 (86.0)	31.9 (89.4)	29.4 (84.9)	23.5 (74.3)	17.5 (63.5)	11.0 (51.8)	7.3 (45.1)	18.6 (65.4)
Mean daily minimum °C (°F)	0.0 (32.0)	2.4 (36.3)	7.1 (44.8)	12.3 (54.1)	15.8 (60.4)	19.5 (67.1)	22.5 (72.5)	20.0 (68.0)	13.5 (56.3)	8.5 (47.3)	3.3 (37.9)	1.0 (33.8)	10.5 (50.9)
Record low °C (°F)	−12.1 (10.2)	−10 (14)	−4.8 (23.4)	2.0 (35.6)	2.4 (36.3)	8.5 (47.3)	13.5 (56.3)	9.0 (48.2)	5.2 (41.4)	−2.2 (28.0)	−9.3 (15.3)	−11.4 (11.5)	−12.1 (10.2)
Average precipitation mm (inches)	54.0 (2.13)	42.0 (1.65)	41.1 (1.62)	18.7 (0.74)	2.2 (0.09)	0 (0)	2.3 (0.09)	1.0 (0.04)	0 (0)	2.3 (0.09)	7.0 (0.28)	20.0 (0.79)	190.6 (7.52)
Average precipitation days	6	6	6	4	1	0	0	0	0	1	2	3	29
Average relative humidity (%)	58	59	50	41	30	23	25	25	24	29	40	52	38
Mean monthly sunshine hours	198.4	183.6	235.6	255.0	347.2	369.0	341.0	337.9	324.0	306.9	264.0	217.0	3,379.6
Source: NOAA (1964–1983)

== Transport ==
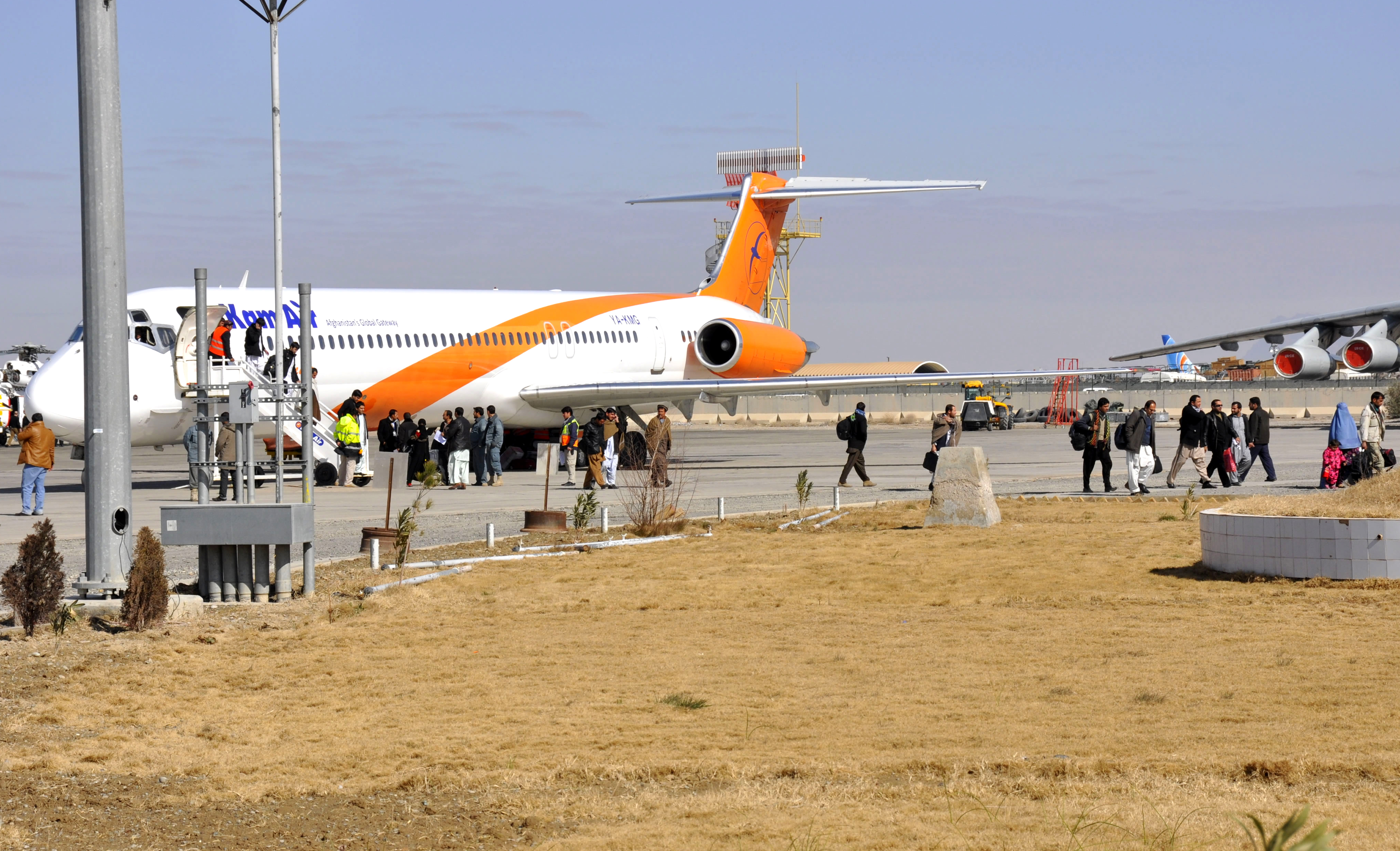
Passengers exiting from a Kam Air MD-83 at the Ahmad Shah Baba International Airport

The Ahmad Shah Baba International Airport is southern Afghanistan's main airport for domestic and international flights. Next to the airport is the now-abandoned United States military base. Most international flights are to Dubai in the United Arab Emirates, Iran, and Saudi Arabia.

Kandahar is connected to Kabul by the Kabul-Kandahar Highway and to Herat by the Kandahar-Herat Highway. The city is also connected to Spin Boldak by the Kandahar-Spin Boldak Highway. The bus terminals in Ayno Maina and Bagh-e-Pul have Mercedes-Benz buses that take passengers to other cities. For the first time the city is being connected by a railroad with Herat to the northwest and Spin Boldak to the southeast.

The government-run Milli Bus had a number of buses in Kandahar in the 1970s. The service ended in the 1990s. Most people in the city own a vehicle or have access to one. Others use taxis, rickshaws, motorcycle, scooters, and bicycles. There are many dealerships on Airport Road importing cars from Dubai, UAE.

== Demographics ==
Religions in Kandahar
Religion	%
Muslims	99.8%
Hindus	0.15%
Others*	0.05%
*includes Sikhs, Baháʼí and Atheists

The city of Kandahar has an estimated population of 732,629 settled residents. This estimated figure does not include the large number of recent returnees from neighboring countries, nor does it include the large number of workers and visitors from other areas of the country.

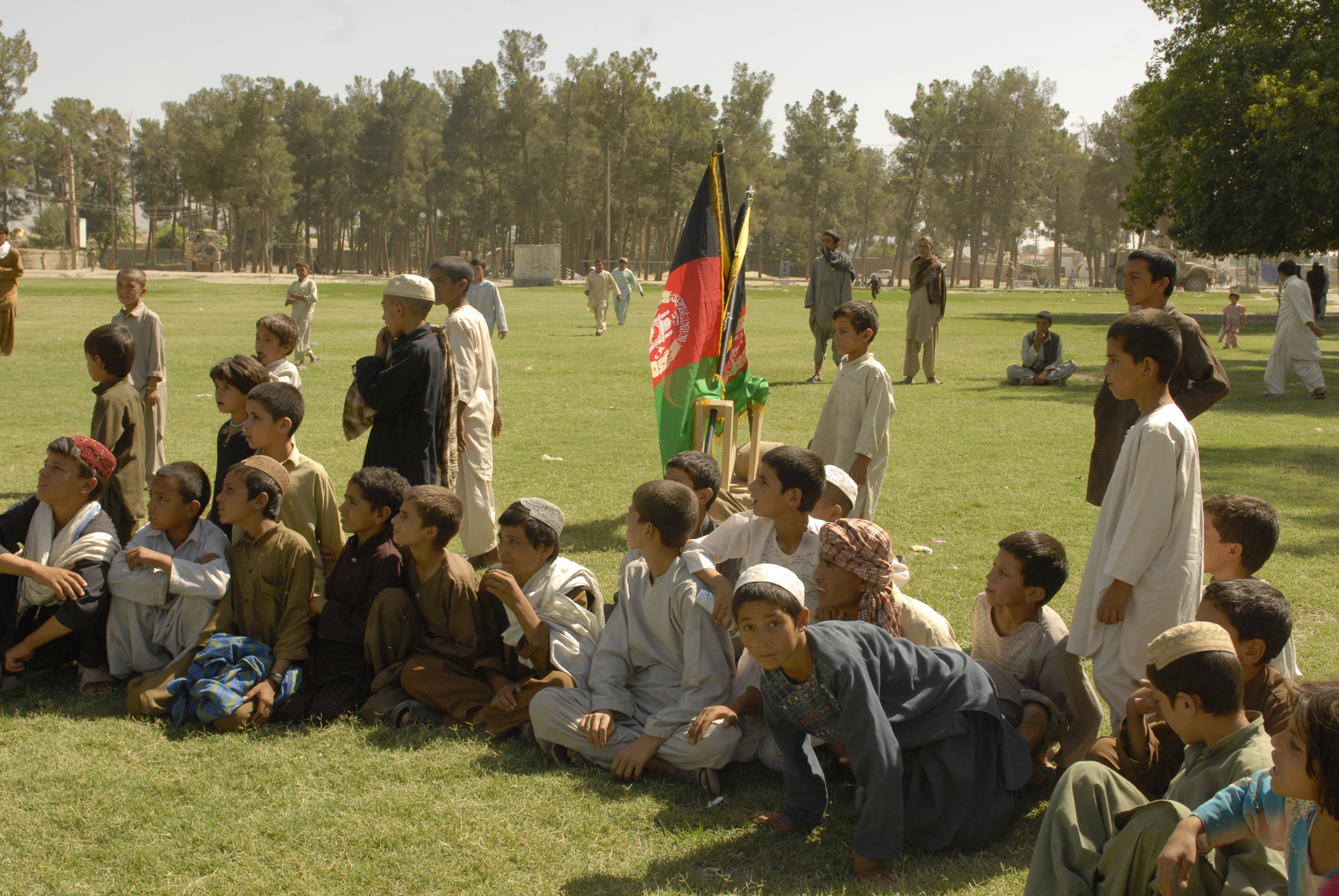
People at a park in 2011

Most people in Kandahar are Pashtuns while some are Baloch, Tajiks, Uzbeks and other. In 2015 there were 61,902 dwelling units in the city. Pashto is the most widely used language and Dari is understood by a number of residents. Both are the official languages of Afghanistan. A 2007 government document stated the following:

The major ethnic group living in [the] province is Pashtoons. This includes major tribes such as Barakzai, Popalzai, Alkozai, Noorzai and Alezai. Pashtu is spoken by more than 98% of population and in more than 98% of villages. Dari is spoken in six villages by 4000 people and Balochi is spoken by 8000 people in two villages. 19000 people in nine villages speak some other unspecified language.

The Pashtun culture, history, traditions, clothing and Pashtunwali is dominant in this region.

== Economy ==
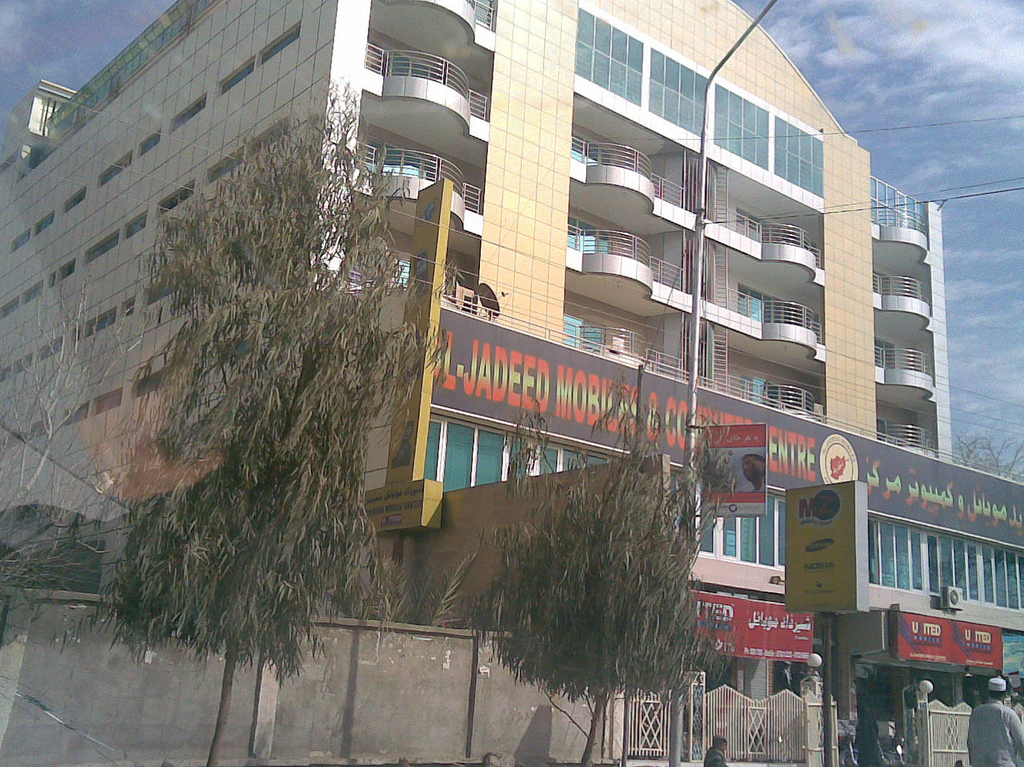
Al-Jadeed Market in Shahr-e Naw

Kandahar's economy is mainly based on agriculture, trade, transport, and tourism. The province is famous for grapes and pomegranates, which are also exported to other countries. Many residents of the city work in the industrial park in the Shorandam area, which has about 300 factories. More are being built in the near future. The city also has several pharmaceutical companies.

There are a number of banks and shopping areas in the city. The following are some of the popular hotels and shopping places.

- Afghan Continental Guest House in Ayno Maina
- Al-Jadid Rahat Hotel next to Madad Chowk (Madad Square)
- Al-Jadeed Market in Shahr-e Naw
- Charsoo
- China Bazaar in center of city
- Dubai Inn in Ayno Maina
- Herat Bazaar
- Haji Baba Restaurant and Hotel on Airport Road
- Kabul Bazaar
- Kandahar Mobile Center
- Kandahar Super Store
- NFC Hotel & Restaurant in Ayno Maina
- Piaroz Super Store
- Roh Supermarket in Ayno Maina
- Samimi Super Store
- Sarposh Bazaar (Covered Market) in center of city
- Shah Bazaar
- Shkar Pur Bazaar

=== Tourism ===
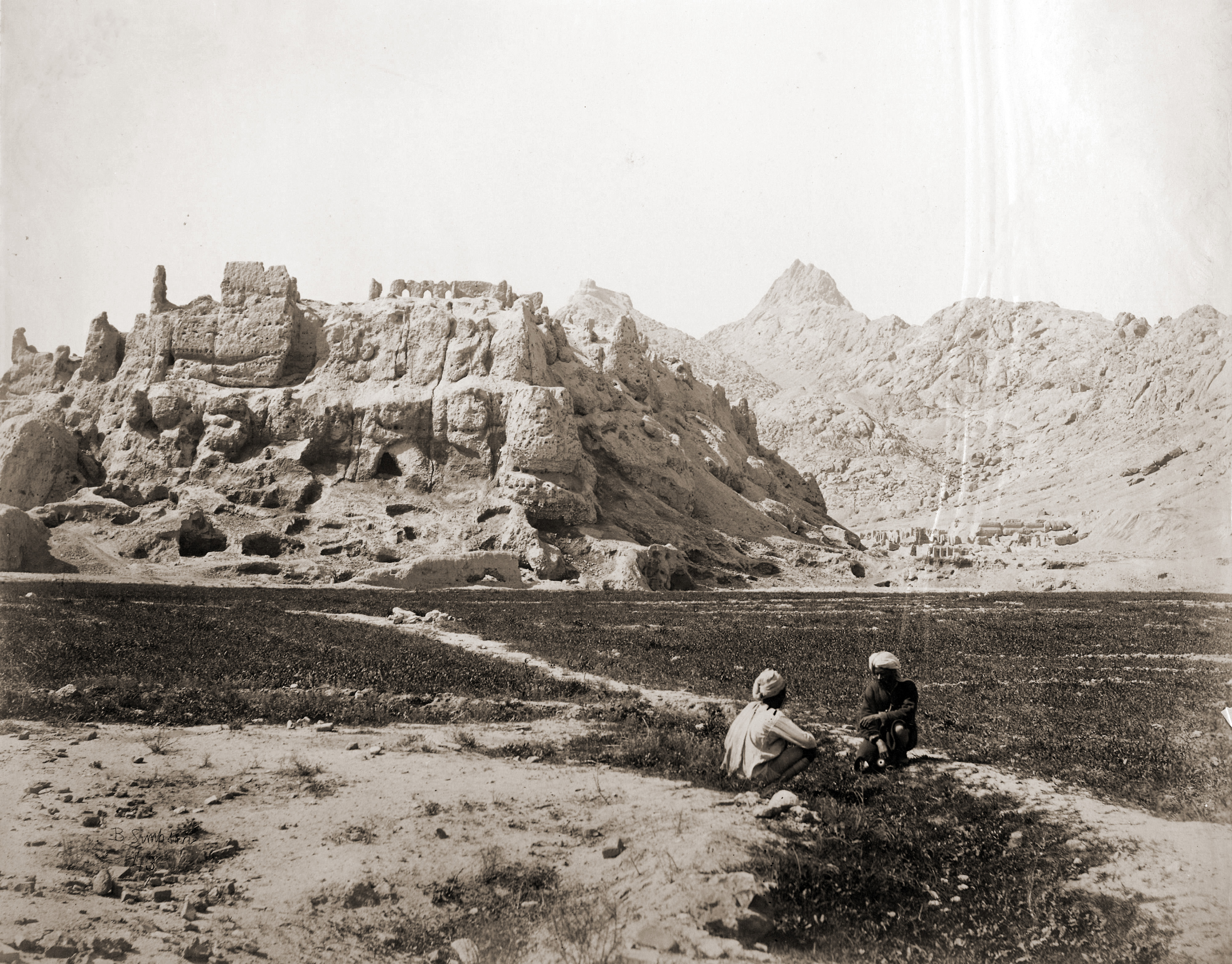
An 1881 photo showing the ruined Old Kandahar citadel of Shah Hussain Hotak that was destroyed by the Afsharid forces of Nader Shah in 1738. This destroyed fortress is still standing today.

The only remaining historical city gate is at Eidgah Gate Square, on Kandahar's main road. The Mausoleum of Ahmad Shah Durrani is located near there, which also houses Durrani's brass helmet and other personal items. In front of the mausoleum is the Khirka Sharif, which contains the Cloak of Muhammad. The cloak is kept locked away, taken out only at times of great crisis. Mullah Omar took it out in November 1996 and displayed it to a crowd of ulema of religious scholars to have himself declared Amir al-Mu'minin (Commander of the Faithful). Prior to that it was taken out when the city was struck by a cholera epidemic in the 1930s. Durrani's historical residence is also in the city.

Just to the north of the city, there is a shrine dedicated to a saint who lived in Kandahar more than 300 years ago. The grave of Hazratji Baba, 7.0 m (23 ft) long to signify his greatness, but otherwise covered solely by rock chips, is undecorated save for tall pennants at its head. The Shahidano Chawk (Martyrs' Square) is located in the center of the city. It was built in the 1940s in honor of the Afghan fighters who died during an attack on British-Indian forces at the Herat Gate.

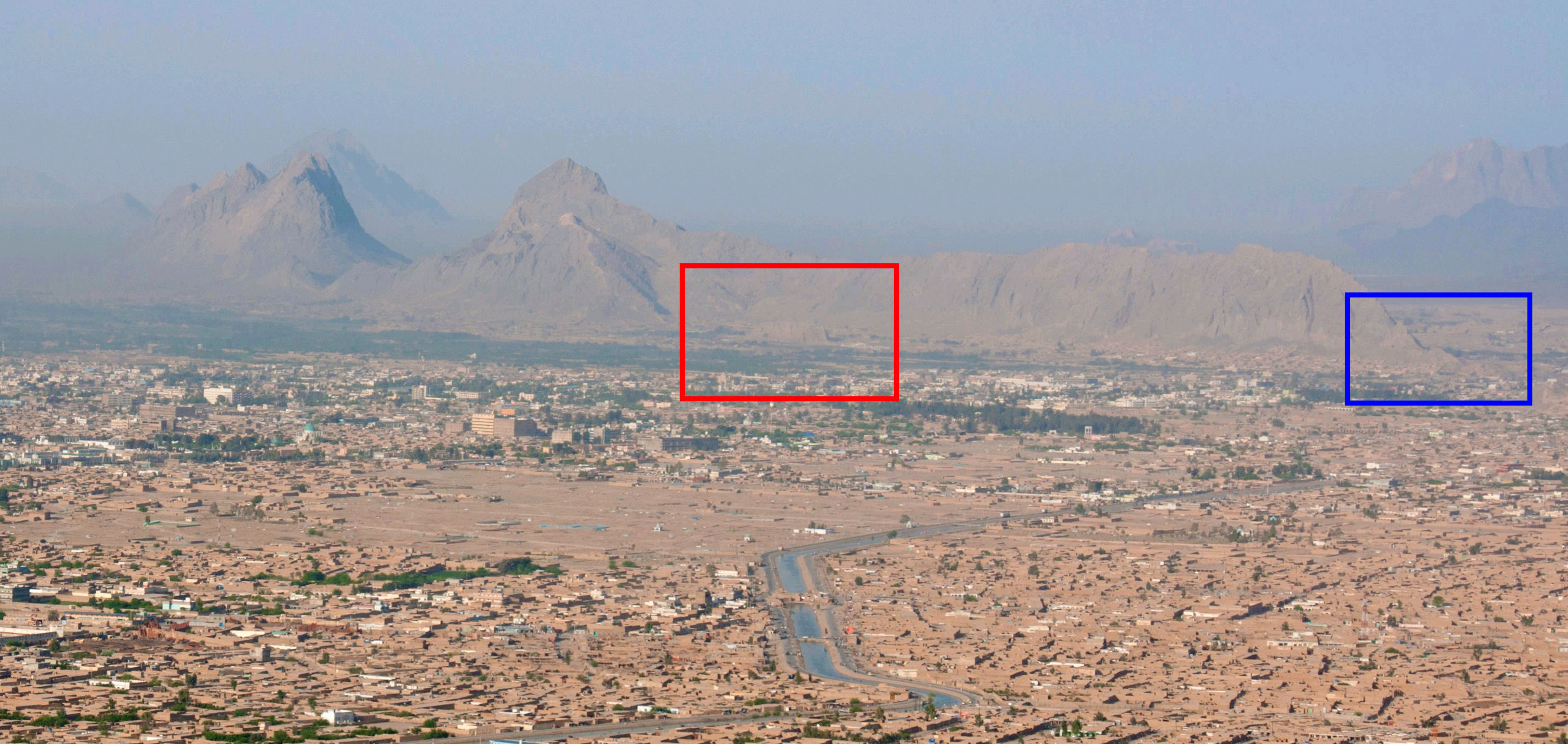
Old Kandahar (red) and Chilzina Complex (blue) in the southwestern part of the city

The Chilzina Complex and Old Kandahar are two other tourists attractions. The Chilzina Complex contains a rock-cut chamber above the plain at the end of the rugged chain of mountains forming the western defense of Old Kandahar, where Ashoka's Kandahar Bilingual Rock Inscription was found. A forty steps climb leads to the chamber, which is inscribed with an account of Babur's conquest.

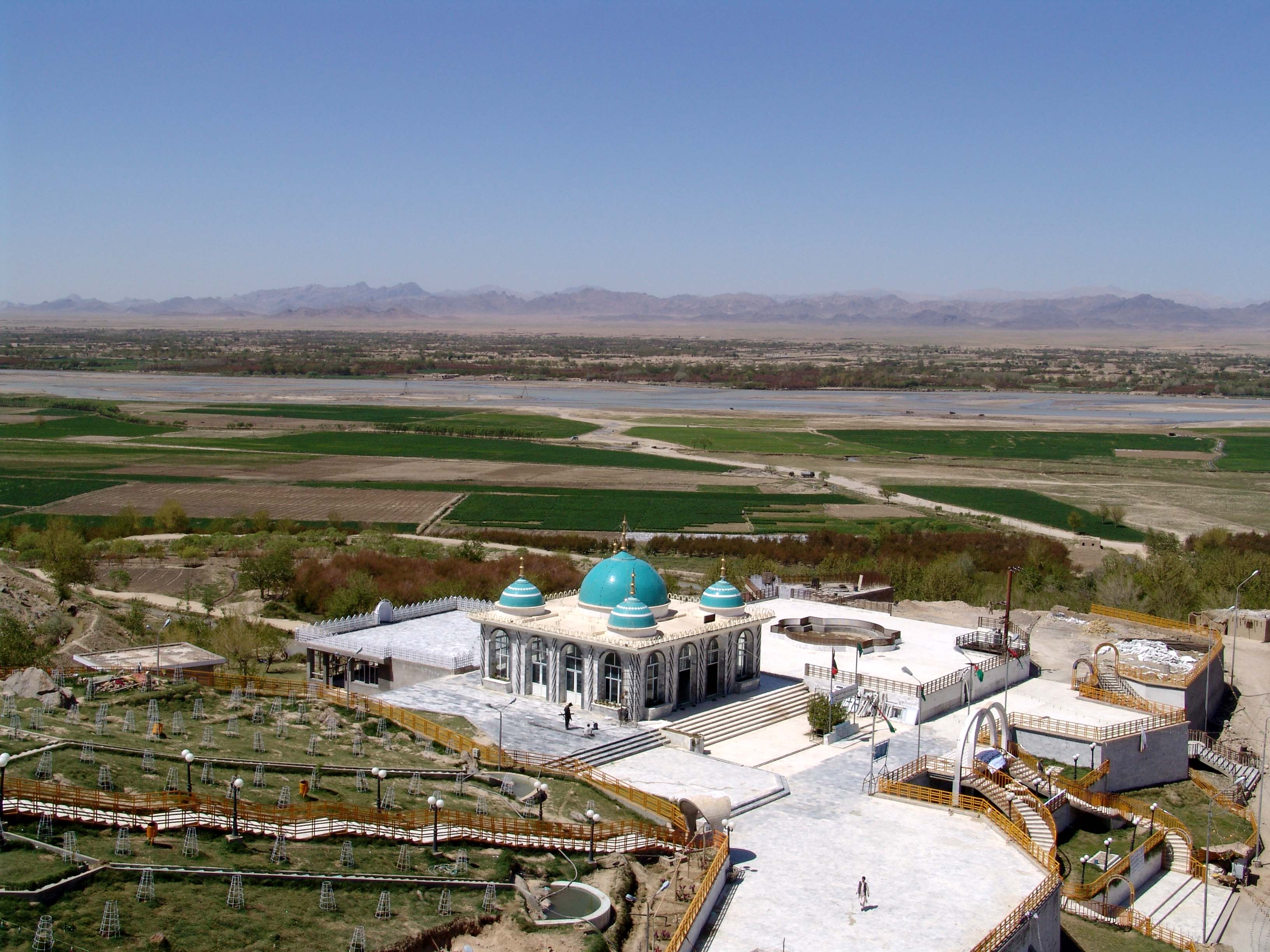
Mausoleum of Baba Wali next to the Arghandab Valley in the northwestern part of the city

A short distance from the Chilzina Complex, going west on the main road, the Mausoleum of Mirwais Hotak appears on the right after passing the Mirwais Maina neighborhood. The Mausoleum of Baba Wali is also popular for afternoon outings. He was a Muslim pir who had a strange encounter with Guru Nanak at Hasan Abdal in what is now Attock District of Pakistan. The Mausoleum of Baba Wali is important to both Muslims and Sikhs.

The Sarpuza Fortress in the Old Kandahar area is said to be originally built by Maurya Emperor Ashoka in the 3d century BC. Sher Surkh village is where Ahmad Shah Durrani's corronation took place. It is located southeast of the city, near what was once called Nadirabad. The Kandahar Museum is located at the western end of the third block of buildings lining the main road east of Eidgah Gate. It has many artifacts, including paintings by the now famous Ghiyassuddin. He is acknowledged among Afghanistan's leading artists. There are numerous mosques, shrines, mausoleums, gardens, and public parks in and around the city. The following are only a few of them.

- Abu Hanifa Mosque in Ayno Maina (under construction)
- Ahmad Shah Baba Mosque in Ayno Maina
- Bagh-e-Pul Park
- Chilzina Complex (Babur's inscription site and a park)
- Eidgah Mosque next to Kandahar University
- Hazrat Muhammad Mustafa Mosque in Ayno Maina
- Hazrat Osman Mosque in Ayno Maina
- Kandahar Shahi Park
- Kandahar Museum
- Khirka Sharif
- Kokaran Park
- Omar Al-Farooq Mosque in the center of the city
- Mosque of the Hair of the Prophet
- Mausoleum of Ahmad Shah Durrani
- Mausoleum of Baba Wali in Arghandab
- Mausoleum of Zarghona Anaa in Arghandab
- Red Mosque in Shahr-e Naw
- Tomb of Malalai of Maiwand in neighboring Maiwand District

== Education ==
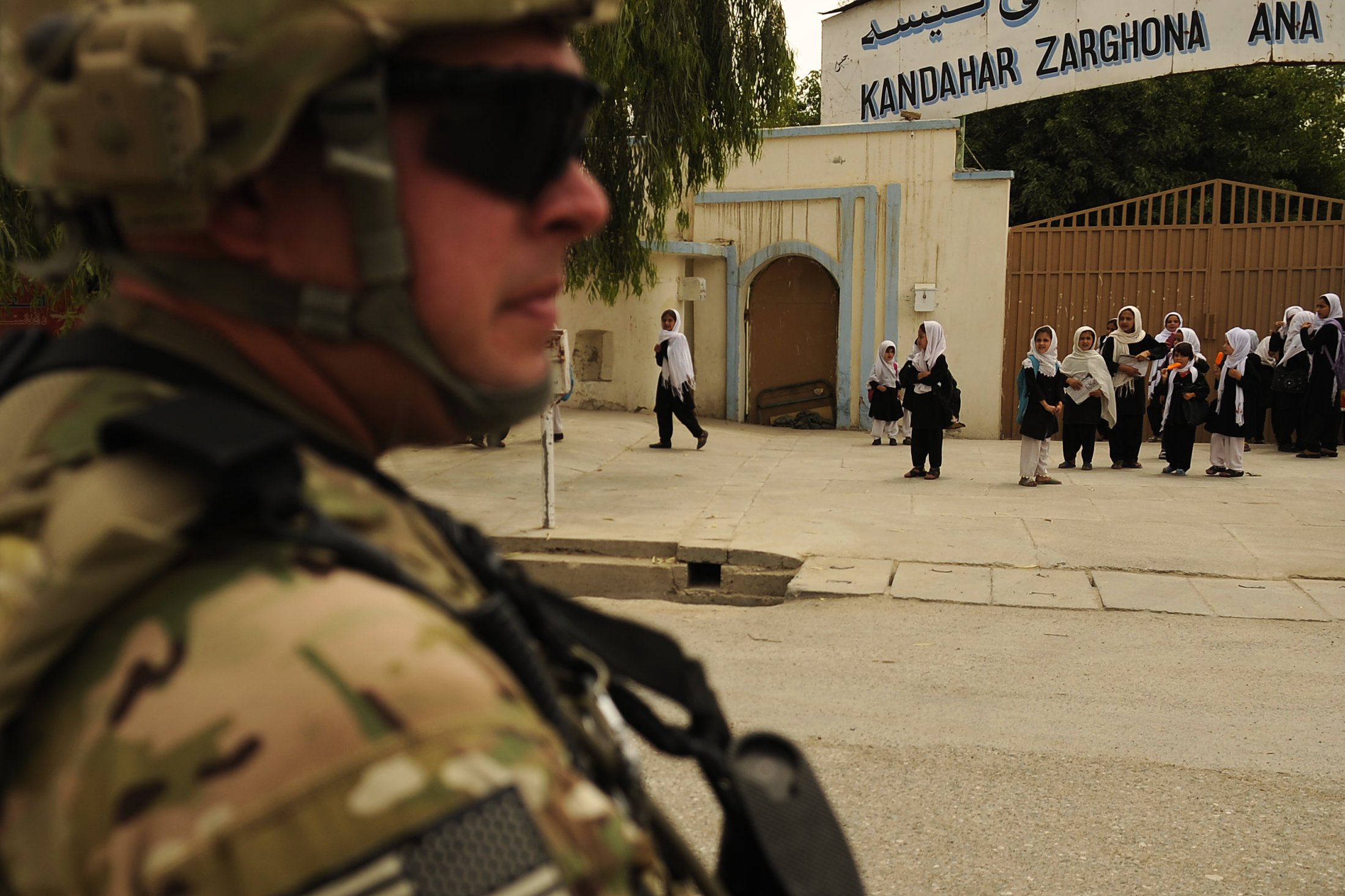
Children from the Zarghona Ana High School watching American soldiers in 2012

There are a number of public and private schools in the city. Some of the oldest schools are Ahmad Shah Baba High School, Malalai High School, Mirwais Neeka High School, Shah Mahmud High School, Zahir Shah High School and Zarghona Ana High School. Many new schools opened in the last two decades, and more are being built as the city's population is rapidly growing with the large returns of Afghans from neighboring countries. Afghan Turk High Schools is one of the top private schools in the city.

There are also a number of universities in the city. Kandahar University was established in 1990 in the northwestern part of the city. It is a public university under the Ministry of Higher Education. A number of private higher education institutions have also opened in the last decade such as Benawa Institute of Higher Education, Malalay Institute of Higher Education, Mirwais Neeka Institute of Higher Education, and Saba Institute of Higher Education.

== Healthcare ==
Kandahar has a number of hospitals and clinics. The following is a list of some of the hospitals in the city. Those seeking advanced medical care travel to faraway cities such as Kabul, Herat or Mazar-i-Sharif. Some apply for medical visa to visit hospitals in foreign countries.

- Afghan National Army Regional Hospital
- Bilal Hospital
- Mirwais Hospital
- Momand Hospital
- Sial Curative Hospital
- Sydal Hospital

== Communications ==
Telecommunication services in the city are provided by Afghan Wireless, Roshan, Etisalat, MTN Group and Afghan Telecom. In November 2006, the Afghan Ministry of Communications signed a $64.5 million agreement with ZTE for the establishment of a countrywide fibre optical cable network.

== Law and government ==
The city of Kandahar is within the jurisdiction of Kandahar District and administratively divided into 15 municipal districts (nahias). Every nahia has a police station and a number of neighborhoods. Mullah Hekmatullah serves as the current mayor of the city. His predecessor was Haji Nimatullah Hassan. The Kandahar Municipality's structure consists of several departments under the mayor. Like other provincial municipalities in Afghanistan, the Kandahar Municipality deals with city affairs such as infrastructure developments. The city districts collect certain taxes and issue building licenses. Each city district has a district head appointed by the mayor.

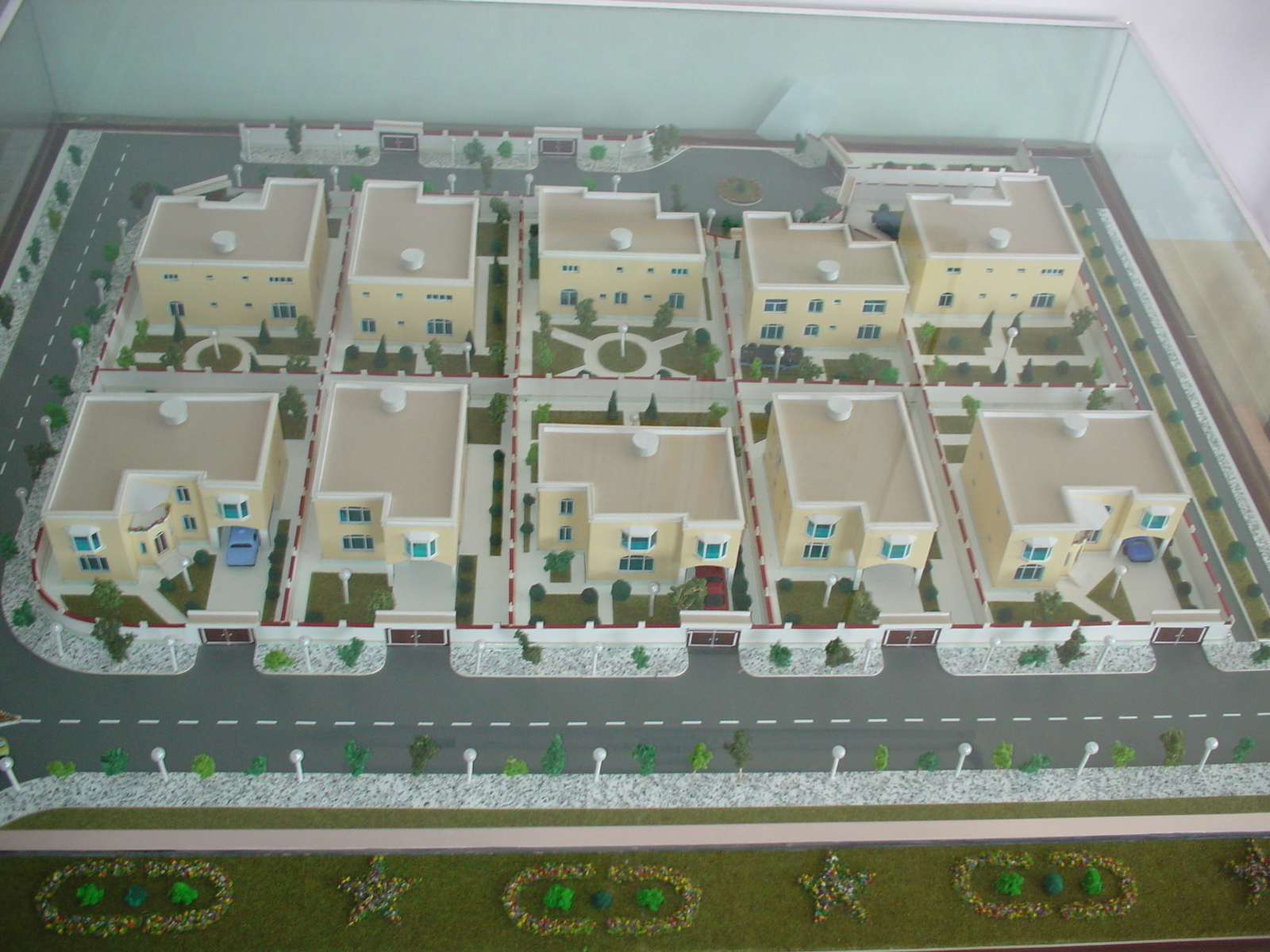
The original miniature of the Ayno Maina neighbourhood, which began in 2003 by Mahmud Karzai and associates.

The decades of war left Kandahar depopulated and with outdated infrastructure, but in recent years large amount of funds poured in for construction purposes. New townships have been established around the city, and a number of modern style buildings have been constructed. Nearly all residents have access to clean drinking water and electricity, and the government is working to extend these services to every home. The city currently gets electricity from the several power plants in the area. Many homes also have solar panels. About 30 km (20 mi) north of the city is the Dahla Dam, the second largest dam in Afghanistan.

The Ayno Maina is a new township in the northeastern part of the city. Started by Mahmud Karzai, the project includes building up to 20,000 single-family homes and associated infrastructure such as roads, water and sewer systems, and community buildings, including schools. It has won 2 awards, the Residential Project and Sustainable Project of the Year at the Middle East Architect Awards. Many high-ranking government employees and civil servants as well as wealthy businessmen began living there, which is a more secured community in Kandahar. Work on the next $100 million scheme was initiated in 2011. Construction of Hamidi Township in the Morchi Kotal area of the city also began in August 2011. It is named after Ghulam Haider Hamidi, the mayor of Kandahar who was assassinated in late July 2011. Situated along the Kandahar-Uruzgan Highway in the northeast of the city, the new township will have 2,000 residential and commercial plots. Including new roads, schools, commercial markets, clinics, canals and other facilities.

About 10 km (6.2 mi) southeast of Kandahar is the Shorandam industrial park, which was established nearly two decades ago. The following is a short and incomplete neighborhood list.

- Ayno Maina
- Ayubi
- Charsoo
- Chawney
- Deh Khoja
- Haji Aziz Maina
- Hamidi Maina (under development since 2011)
- Malajat
- Mirwais Maina
- Sardar Mohammad Daud Khan Maina
- Sarpuza
- Shahr-e Naw
- Topkhana
- Old Kandahar

== Sports ==
Cricket, football, futsal and volleyball are the most popular sports in Kandahar.

Professional sports teams from Kandahar

Club	League	Sport	Venue	Established
Kandahar Knights	Afghanistan Premier League	Cricket	Sharjah Cricket Stadium	2018
Boost Defenders	Shpageeza Cricket League	Cricket	Kandahar International Cricket Stadium	2013
De Maiwand Atalan F.C.	Afghan Premier League	Football	Kandahar Stadium	2012

=== Stadiums ===
- Kandahar International Cricket Stadium
- Kandahar Stadium

== Notable people ==
- Kandahari Begum, wife of Mughal emperor Shah Jahan
- Nur Jahan – Empress of the Mughal Empire, chief wife of Mughal emperor Jahangir
- Mirwais Hotak – founder of the Hotak dynasty
- Abdul Aziz Hotak – ruler of the Hotak dynasty
- Mahmud Hotak – ruler of the Hotak dynasty and Shah of Persia
- Ashraf Hotak – Shah of Persia
- Hussain Hotak – ruler of the Hotak dynasty
- Ahmad Shah Durrani – founding father of Afghanistan, buried in the city
- Dost Mohammad Khan – Emir of Afghanistan and son of Payandah Khan
- Sher Ali Khan – Emir of Afghanistan and son of Dost Mohammad Khan
- Abdur Rahman Khan – Emir of Afghanistan and son of Dost Mohammad Khan
- Ghulam Muhammad Tarzi – leader of Tarzi family who played an important part in Afghan history during the late 19th century onward
- Abdul Rehman Khan, father of Bollywood actor Kader Khan
- Mohammad Ibraheem Khwakhuzhi
- Maryam Durani an Afghan activist and women's advocate
- Ubaidullah Jan – Pashto music king of southern Afghanistan
- Naghma – Afghan musician in the United States
- Nashenas – Afghan musician in the United Kingdom
- Abdul Hai Habibi – scholar, former professor at Kabul University and author of many books
- The Karzais – the family of Afghan President Hamid Karzai
- Gul Agha Sherzai – served as the governor of Kandahar Province followed by as governors of Nangarhar Province
- Said Tayeb Jawad – former Afghanistan Ambassador to the United States
- Yousef Pashtun – Afghan politician
- Nasrat Haqparast – UFC Lightweight Fighter
- Khan Mohammad Mujahid – Alokozai tribe leader
- Malalai of Maiwand – National folk hero of Afghanistan
- Hibatullah Akhundzada – Supreme leader of Afghanistan as of 2021
- Akhtar Mansour – Second supreme leader of the Taliban
- Faizullah Kakar - Former deputy minister of health for Karzai government and former chief of staff for Ashraf Ghani

== See also ==
- List of cities in Afghanistan
- Operation Dreamseed
