= Relics associated with Muhammad =

Relics of the Islamic prophet Muhammad

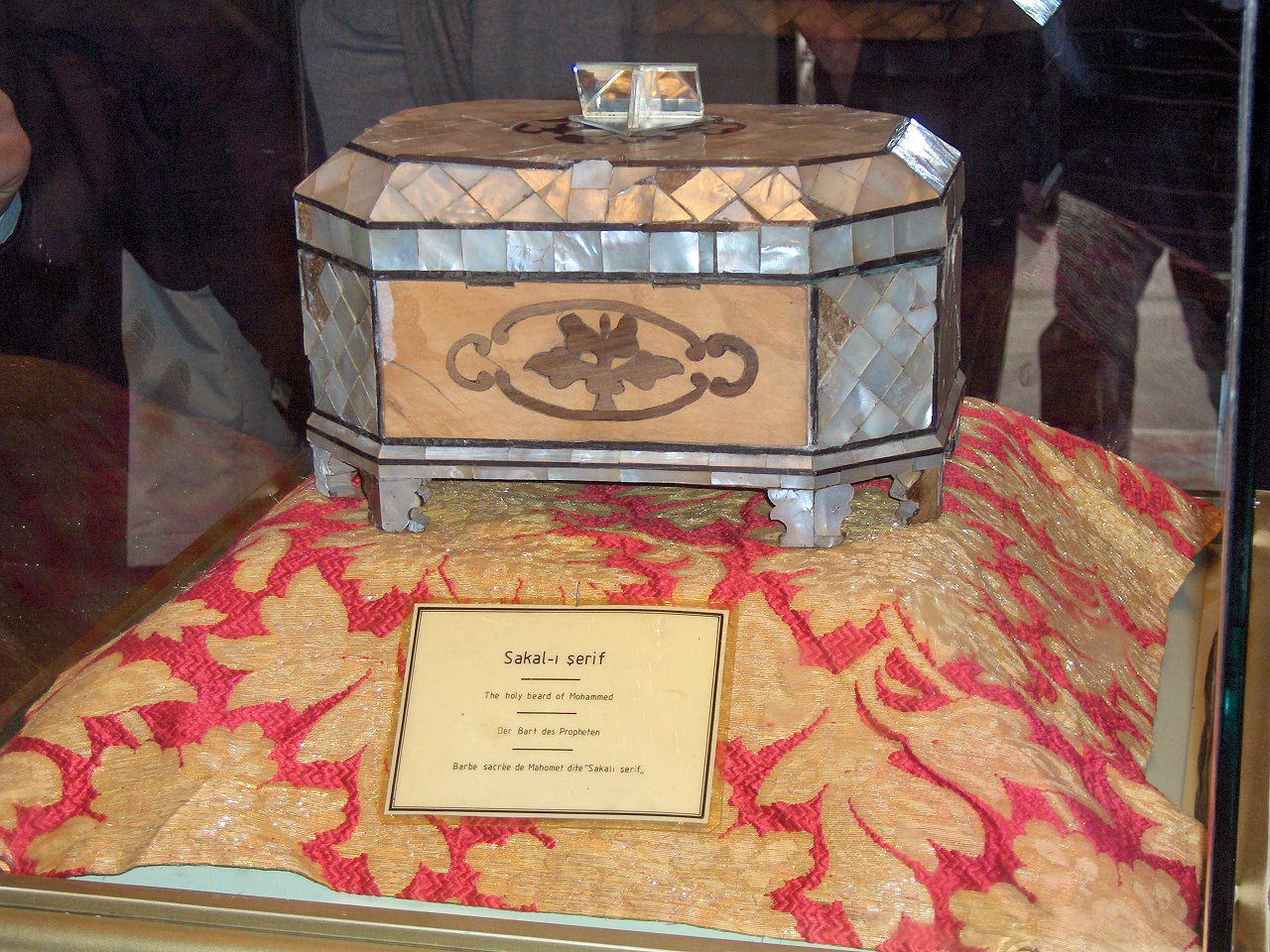
Box with a part of Muhammad's beard. Maulâna Rumi mausoleum, Konya, Turkey

A series of objects are venerated in Islam because of associations with the Islamic prophet Prophet Muhammad.

Islam has had a long history of relic veneration, especially of veneration of relics attributed to Muhammad. There exists historical evidence that some of the earliest Muslims practiced the veneration of relics, and the practice remained popular in many parts of the Sunni Islamic world until the 18th century, when the reform movements of Salafism and Wahhabism began to staunchly condemn such practices, linking them with the Islamic sin of shirk (idolatry). As a result of the influence of these perspectives, some contemporary Muslims have rejected the traditional practice of relic veneration altogether. Some of the most prominent collections of relics include Sacred Relics at Topkapı Palace in Istanbul, Moi-e-Muqqadas at Hazratbal in the Vale of Kashmir, the Cloak of Muhammad at Kirka Sharif in Kandahar, and the relics at Badshahi Mosque in Lahore.

The 17th-century French explorer Jean-Baptiste Tavernier wrote about his discussions with two treasurers of Constantinople, who described the standard, mantle and the seal. Two centuries later, Charles White wrote about the mantle, the standard, the beard, tooth, and footprint of Muhammad, the last of which he saw personally.

== Standard ==
The battle standard of Muhammad, known in Turkish as Sancak-ı Şerif ("Holy Standard"), is claimed to have served as the curtain over the entrance of his wife Aisha's tent. According to another tradition, the standard had been part of the turban of Buraydah ibn al-Husayb, an enemy who was ordered to attack Muhammad, but instead bowed to him, unwound his turban and affixed it to his spear, dedicating it and himself to Muhammad's service.

Selim I (r. 1512–1520) acquired it after the Ottoman conquest of Egypt, and had it taken to the Grand Mosque of Damascus where it was to be carried during the annual Hajj pilgrimage to Mecca. Murad III (r. 1574–1595) had it sent to Hungary as a way to motivate his army. In 1595, Mehmed III (r. 1595–1603) had it brought to Topkapı Palace, where it was sewn into another standard, alleged to be Umar's and together they were encased in a rosewood box, inlaid with gems including tortoiseshell and mother of pearl. The keys to the box were traditionally held by the Kizlar Agha. It became associated with the Ottoman Empire, and was exhibited whenever the Sultan or Grand Vizier appeared before the field army, such as at the 1826 Auspicious Incident and at the outset of Turkey's entrance into World War I. Tavernier reported that it was kept outside the Sultan's bedroom in the 17th century. By 1845 White said he saw it resting against a wall near the Ottoman standard and by 1920 its whereabouts were unknown.

== Holy Mantle ==
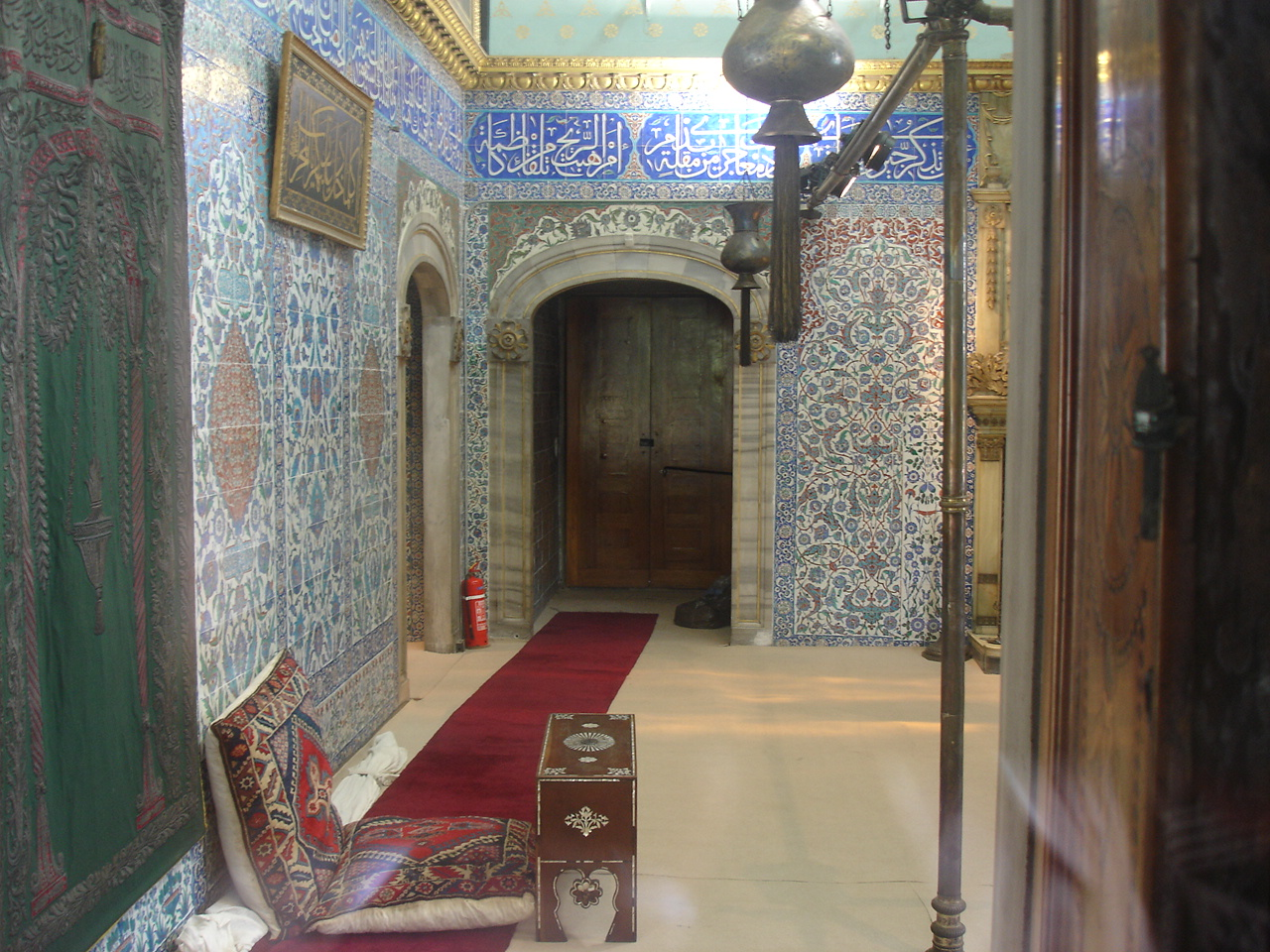
Inside the Chamber of the Blessed Mantle

The Holy Mantle, Hırka-i Şerif, or Burda is an item of clothing that was given as a gift by Muhammad to Ka'b ibn Zuhayr, whose children sold it to Muawiyah I, the founder of the Umayyad dynasty. After the fall of the Umayyads, the Mantle went to Baghdad under the Abbasids, to Cairo under the Mamluks, and finally moved by Selim I to Topkapi Palace in 1595.

The Poem of the Mantle was composed by Imam al-Busiri in praise of Muhammad and the mantle.

Tavernier described it as a white coat made of goat's hair with large sleeves, or a cream fabric with black wool lines.

The Grand Seignor having taken it out of the Coffer, kisses it with much respect, and puts it into the hands of the Capi-Aga, who is come into the Room by his Order, after they had taken the Impressions of the Seal. The Officer sends to the Overseer of the Treasury, for a large golden Cauldron, which is brought in thither by some of the Senior-Pages. It is so capacious, according to the description which they gave me of it, as to contain the sixth part of a Tun, and the out-side of it is gamish'd, in some places, with Emeralds, and Turquezes. This Vessel is fill'd with water within six fingers breadth of the brink, and the Capi-Aga, having put Mahomet's Garment into it, and left it to soak a little while, takes it out again, and wrings it hard, to get out the water it has imbib'd, which falls into the Cauldron, taking great care that there falls not any of it to the ground. That done, with the said water he fills a great number of Venice-Chrystl Bottles, containing about half a pint, and when he has stopp'd them, he Seals them with the Grand Seignor's Seal. They afterwards set the Garment a drying, till the twentieth day of the Ratnazan, and then his Highness comes to see them put [it] up again in the Coffer.

== Sacred Seal ==
The Sacred seal, or Mühr-ü Şerif in Turkish, was reported by Tavernier, who said it was kept in a small ebony box in a niche cut in the wall by the foot of a divan in the relic room at Topkapi.

The seal itself is encased in crystal, approximately 3"x4", with a border of ivory. It has been used as recently as the 17th century to stamp documents.

The seal is a rectangular piece of red agate, about 1 cm in length, inscribed with الله / محمد رسول (i.e., Allah "God") in the first line, and Muḥammad rasūl "Muhammad, messenger" in the second). According to Muslim historiographical tradition, Muhammad's original seal was inherited by Abu Bakr, Umar, and Uthman, but lost by Uthman in a well in Medina. Uthman is said to have made a replica of the seal, and this seal was supposedly found in the capture of Baghdad (1534) and brought to Istanbul.

== Hair ==
Known in Ottoman Turkish as the Sakal-ı Şerif, the beard was said to have been removed from Muhammad's face by his favorite barber in the presence of Abu Bakr, Ali and several others. Individual hairs were later taken away, but the beard itself is kept in a glass case at Topkapi Palace.

The Dargah Sharif of Hazratbal in Srinagar contains strands of what is believed by many Kashmiri Muslims to be Muhammad's hair. The relic named Moi-e-Muqqadas was first brought to Kashmir by Syed Abdullah Madani, a purported descendant of Muhammad who left Medina (in present-day Saudi Arabia) and settled in the South Indian city of Bijapur in 1635, at a time when the Islamic Mughal Empire was rapidly expanding across India.

== Teeth ==
Muhammad lost four teeth at the Battle of Uhud, after being struck with a battle axe. Two of the teeth were supposedly lost, one was preserved at Topkapi, and another was held by Mehmed II.

== Footprint ==
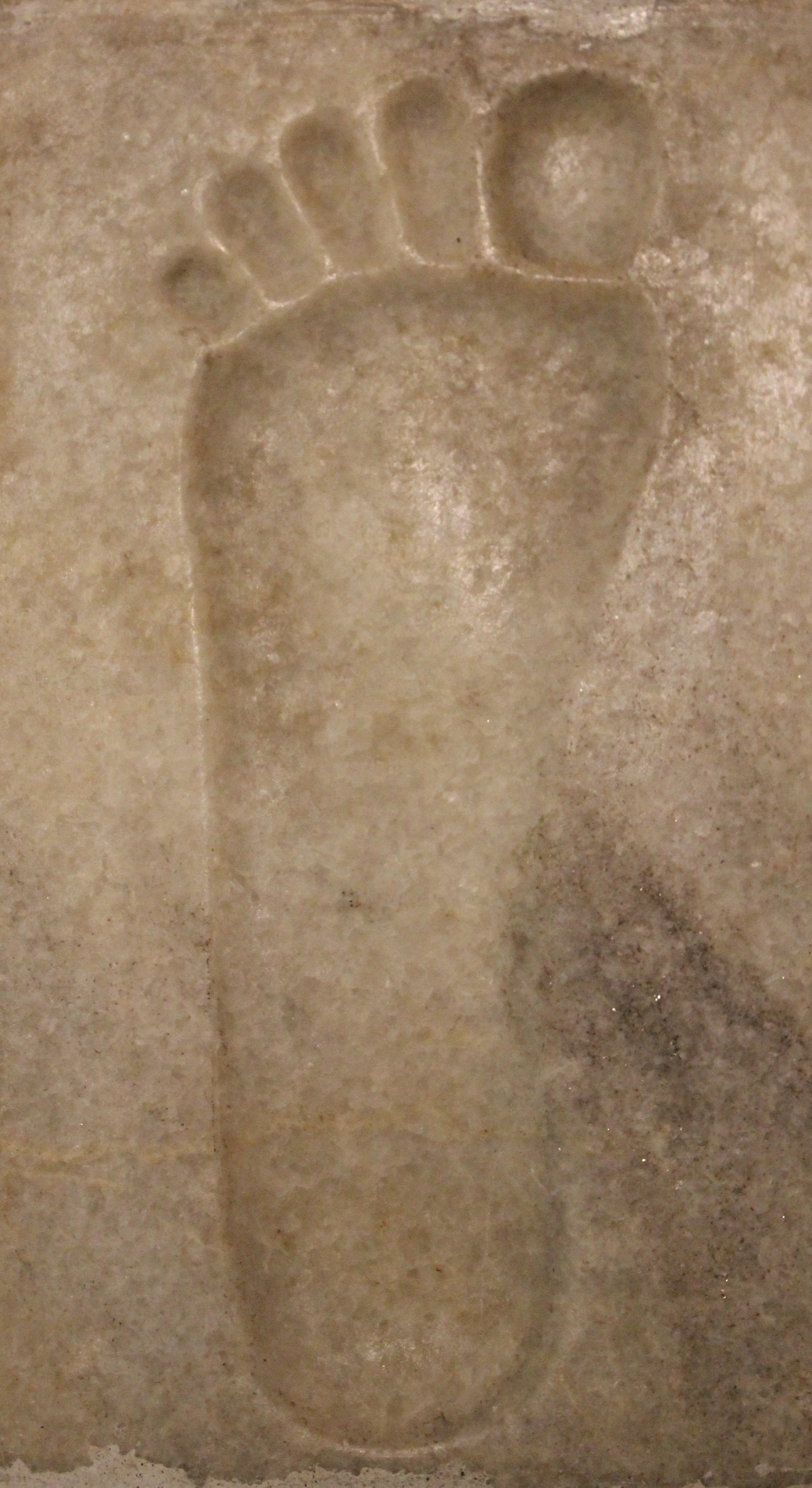
Qadam-e-rasul at National Museum, New Delhi

Qadam-e-Rasul (Arabic: قدم الرسول; lit. 'Footprint of the Messenger') is a type of veneration of Muhammad. It comes from the belief started early in Islam that when Muhammad stepped on a rock his footprint left an imprint. This belief was never accepted by orthodox branches of Islam; however, the idea was disseminated widely and led to the creation of many shrines around such imprints.

=== Claimed sites ===
==== Bangladesh ====
- Qadam Rasul Mosque, Gaur
- Qadam Mubarak Shahi Mosque, Chittagong
- Qadam Rasul Dargah Sharif, Bandar
- Khan Shahi Jame Mosque, Bagichahat

==== Egypt ====
- Funerary complex of Sultan Qaytbay, Cairo
- Athar an Nabi Mosque, Cairo
- Ahmad al-Badawi Mosque, Tanta

==== India ====
- Dargah Qadam Sharif, Delhi
- Qadam Sharif Mosque, Murshidabad, West Bengal
- Qadam Sharif, Ahmedabad, Gujarat
- Qadam Sharif, Lucknow
- Qadam Rasul, Bahraich
- Qadam Sharif, Cuttack, Odisha

==== Palestine ====
- Foundation Stone, Dome of the Rock, Jerusalem

==== Syria ====
- Al-Qadam Mosque, Damascus
- Sayyidah Ruqayya Mosque, Damascus

==== Turkey ====
- Eyüp Sultan Mosque, Istanbul
- Sacred Relics (Topkapı Palace), Istanbul
- Tomb of Abdul Hamid I, Istanbul

== Sandals ==
The Blessed Sandals, Nalain Shareef in Urdu, have traditionally been used to gain the blessings of Muhammad.

== Bowl ==
An almost 1500-year-old bowl supposedly used by Muhammad which after his death was kept by his daughter Fatimah and her husband Ali, the fourth Caliph and Muhammad's cousin. After their death, the bowl was kept by their children Hasan and Hussein. The bowl was passed from generation to generation by descendants of Muhammad until it finally reached Britain. On 21 September 2011 the bowl was delivered to Chechnya and now is kept in Akhmad Kadyrov Mosque in Grozny.

Regarding the bowl, Ibn Kathir, the Islamic scholar and commentator on the Qur'an, writes in his book Wives of the Prophet Muhammad:

It had been related by Abu Hurairah that on one occasion, when Khadijah was still alive, Jibril came to the Prophet (peace and blessings of Allah be upon him) and said, "O Messenger of Allah, Khadijah is just coming with a bowl of soup (or food or drink) for you. When she comes to you, give her greetings of peace from her Lord and from me, and give her the good news of a palace of jewels in the Garden, where there will be neither any noise nor any tiredness."

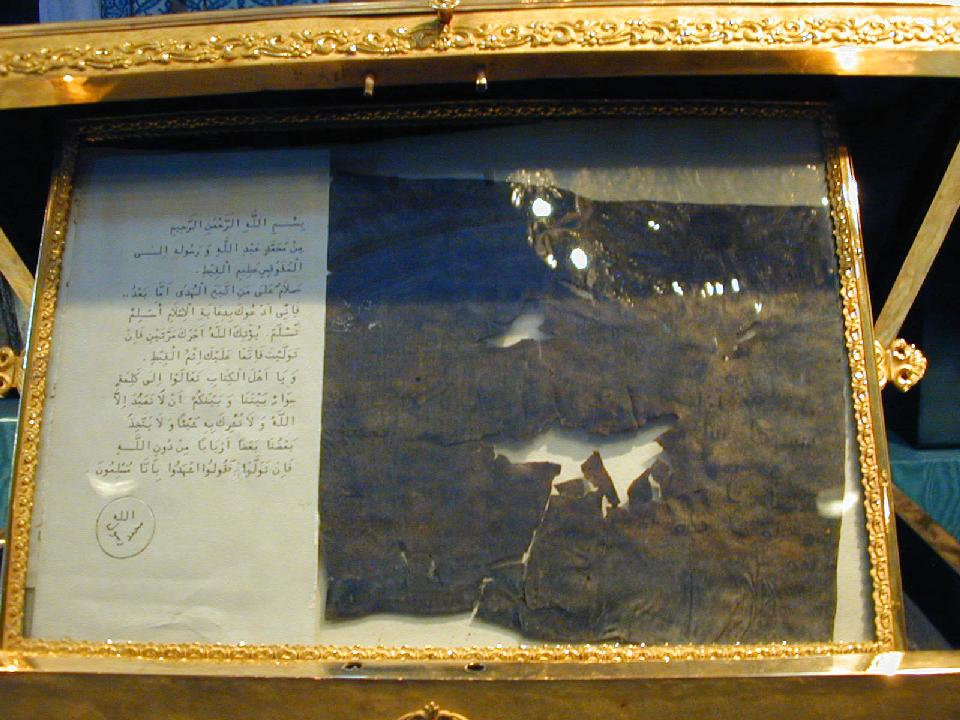
Muhammad's letter to the Muqawqis of Egypt, Topkapı Palace Museum, Istanbul

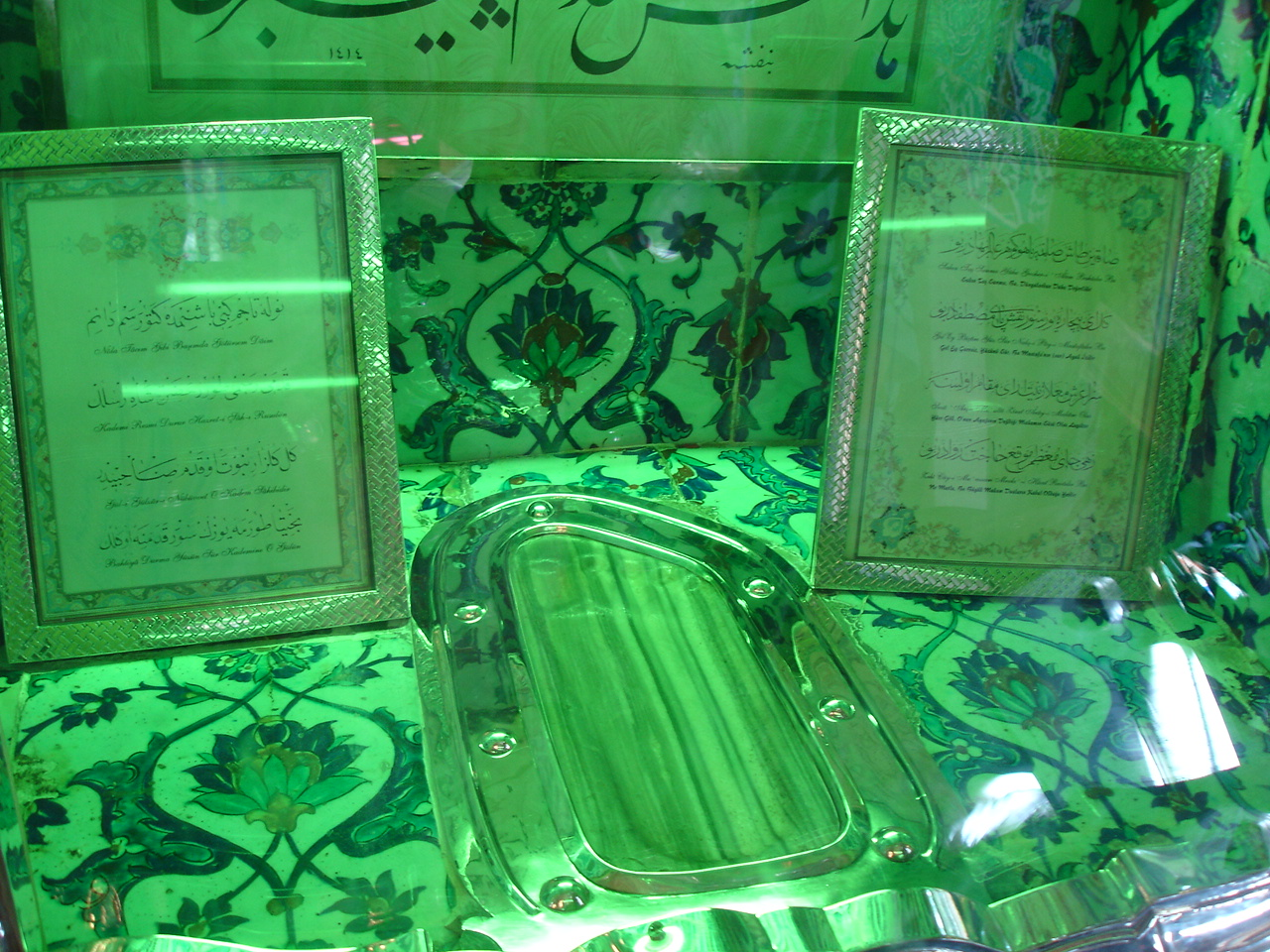
Muhammad's footprint on exhibit in the tomb at Eyüp Sultan Mosque complex, Istanbul.

== Hadithic references ==
A number of hadith refer to blessings resulting from physical contact with Muhammad's person, or bodily fluids. According to Al-Uthaymin, a representative scholar of Salafi Islam, Muhammad is the only person who people can seek blessings from, whether through his body, what touches his body or bodily fluids.

== See also ==
- Ashtiname of Muhammad
- Bayt al-Mawlid, the house where Muhammad is believed to have been born
- Cloak of Muhammad
- Possessions of Muhammad
- Seal of Muhammad
- Letters of Muhammad
- Relics associated with Buddha
- Relics associated with Jesus
