= Cloak of Muhammad =

Cloak believed to have been worn by the founder of Islam

Coordinates: 31.6196°N 65.7080°E

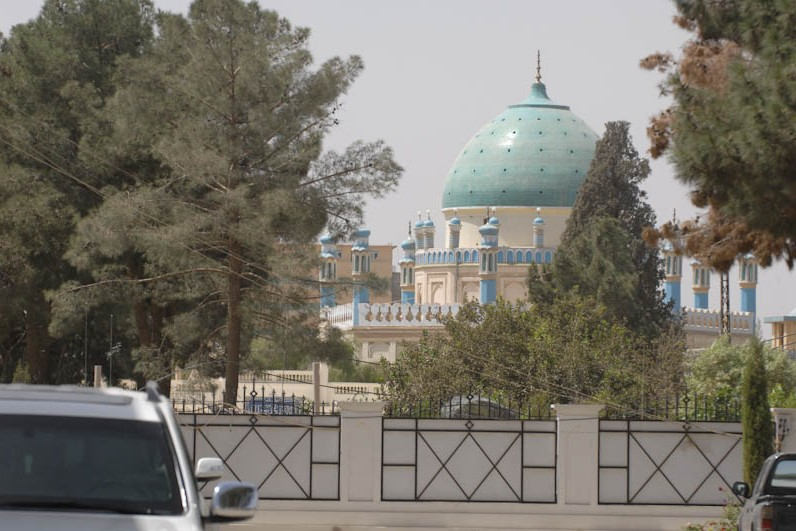
Mausoleum of Ahmad Shah Durrani

The Cloak of Muhammad is an Islamic relic hidden inside one of the buildings in Khirka Sharif in Kandahar, Afghanistan. The relic is a khirqa (cloak) believed to have been worn by the Islamic prophet Muhammad during the Night Journey in 621 AD.

The cloak itself is locked away inside the complex and is rarely seen. It has been guarded by the same family for over 250 years. Its guardians have traditionally only shown the cloak to recognized leaders of Afghanistan, although in times of great crisis such as natural disasters, it has been publicly displayed as a means of reassurance.

The Mausoleum of Ahmad Shah Durrani is also located in the Khirka Sharif complex. Afghans generally pray first at the congregational mosque and then take a tour inside the mausoleum or the separate building that houses the relic and other Islamic antiques.

== History ==
The cloak was given to Amir Ahmad Shah Durrani (regarded as the founder of modern Afghanistan) by Amir Murad Beg of Bukhara (in modern Uzbekistan) in 1768 in order to solidify a treaty between the two leaders. An alternate account states that when Ahmad Shah had traveled to Bukhara, he saw the cloak of Muhammad. He then decided to take the artifact with him to Kandahar, and asked whether he could "borrow" the cloak from its keepers. They, worrying that he might try to remove it from Bukhara, told him it could not be taken from the city. Ahmad Shah then is said to have pointed to a heavy stela of stone firmly planted in the ground, saying that he would never take the cloak far from the stone. The keepers, gratified at his answer, handed him the cloak. Ahmad Shah then took the cloak, ordered the stone slab to be dug up, and carried them both back with him to Kandahar, where the stone now stands near his mazar (tomb).

In 1996, Mullah Muhammad Omar, the leader of the Taliban, removed the cloak from the shrine and held it in front of a large crowd of his followers. This symbolic act is commonly considered a key point in the rise of the Taliban, and in the rise of Omar himself, associating Omar with both Ahmad Shah Durrani and the Islamic prophet Muhammad. Upon Omar's holding of the cloak, the crowd began to shout "Amir al-Mu'minin" (Commander of the Faithful), a title that Ayman al-Zawahiri, the leader of al-Qaeda, occasionally used to refer to Omar. In a New York Times piece from late 2001, the then-keeper of the Shrine, Qari Shawali, confirmed that in 1996, he allowed Omar to view the cloak and remove it from the shrine. Shawali added that only two persons had looked at the cloak in his lifetime before Omar. The first person was Mohammad Zahir Shah, the last King of Afghanistan, who twice opened the chest in which the cloak was kept but proceeded no further. The second person was Pir Ahmed Gailani, a political leader and one of Zahir's relatives. In 2012, Waheed Muzhda, an Afghan political analyst and one-time high-ranking official in the Taliban foreign ministry, corroborated that Omar held the cloak but denied a claim that he donned the cloak: "From what I know, from sources close to Omar, and from a chat with the keeper of the shrine [where the cloak is kept], Omar did not wear the cloak. With great respect, he held the cloak in front of the religious leaders gathered for allegiance."

In June 2018, the cloak was last seen in public when Afghan President Ashraf Ghani opened the box of the cloak, and with attendees prayed for peace during a three-day Eid ceasefire in Afghanistan (from 15 to 17 June 2018).

== See also ==
- Ahl al-Kisa – Islamic prophet Muhammad and four members of his family
- Blessed Mantle – another cloak of the Prophet Muhammad
