= Salit =

Salit or Sal'it may refer to:

- Sal'it, Israeli settlement
- Givat Sal'it, Israeli outpost
- Salit (name)
