= Possessions of Muhammad =

Possessions that were believed to have belonged to Muhammad

The possessions of the Islamic prophet Muhammad are a group of his items and possessions such as weapons, armor and clothing, including those known with unique names. There is doubt about the attribution of these possessions to Muhammad, as many of them were lost during wars and tribulations.

== Weapons ==
=== Swords ===
Muhammad had nine swords: 2 through inheritance, 3 from spoils of war, and the remaining were given as gifts. Eight of the nine swords of Muhammed are in the Topkapı Palace, Turkey. The 9th one is in Cairo, Egypt.

However, only the "Dhu al-faqar" was proven in the authentic Sunnah of these swords.

- Al-’Adb (Arabic: العَضب) is the name of sword meaning “anger” or “sharp.” This sword was sent to Muhammad by one of his companions, Saʽd ibn ʽUbadah, just before the Battle of Badr. Muhammad also used this sword at the Battle of Uhud and his followers used it, to note one companion Samaak bin Kharsha (commonly known as "Abu Dujanah"), to demonstrate their fealty to him, to show the strength, solidity and durability of Islam and Muslims' elegance in front of the Qurayshis who opposed him. Currently the sword is in the Al-Hussein Mosque in Cairo, Egypt.
- Al-Ma’thur (Arabic: المأثُوُر), also known as “Ma’thur al-Fijar” is the sword which was owned by Muhammad before he received his first revelations in Mecca. This sword was given to him due to the will of his father. When Muhammad migrated from Mecca to Medina, the sword remained with him until it was transferred to Ali ibn Abi Talib, along with other war equipment. The length of the sword with the handle is 95 cm, the length of the handle is 14 cm, the width at the handle is 4 cm, while the length of the blade is 81 cm, and the length at the tip is 3.5 cm. The handle is made of gold in the shape of two serpents, and is encrusted with emeralds and turquoise. Near the handle is an inscription saying: Abdullah ibn Abd al-Muttalib. This sword is housed in the Topkapi Museum, Istanbul.
- Ar-Rasub (Arabic: الرسَّوب). The sword is preserved in the Topkapi museum, Istanbul. The blade of this sword is 140 cm in length. It has gold circles.
- Al-Battar (Arabic: البَتَّار, meaning "cutter") sword was taken by Muhammad as booty from the Banu Qaynaqa. It is called the “sword of the prophets” and is inscribed in Arabic with the names of David, Solomon, Moses, Aaron, Joshua, Zechariah, John, Jesus, and Muhammad. It also has a drawing of King David cutting off the head of Goliath. The sword also features a Nabataean inscription. The length of blade of this sword is 101 cm, the sword is made of copper with a black sheath. It is currently in the Topkapi Museum in Istanbul, along with eight of the nine preserved swords of Muhammad. It is claimed by some to be the sword that Jesus will use when he returns to Earth to defeat the anti-Christ, Dajjal. https://damas-original.nur.nu/Bilder/Prophet-swords_batar-david.jpg
- Hatf (Arabic: الحتف, meaning "death") is a sword which Muhammad took as booty from the Banu Qaynaqa. It is said that King David took the sword “al-Battar” from Goliath as booty when he defeated him, when he was less than 20 years old. God gave King David the ability to work with iron, to make armour and weapons and instruments of war, and using his ability made for himself a sword. It was thus that the Hatf sword came about, resembling the al-Battar but larger than it. He used this sword and it was passed onto the tribe of Levites who kept the weapons of the Israelites until it passed into the hands of Muhammad. Nowadays this sword is housed in the Topkapi museum. The blade of this sword is 112 cm in length and has a width of 8 cm. It is the heaviest of swords and Muhammad gave the sword to Ali bin Abi Talib.
- Qal’i (Arabic: القلعى) sword is known as “Qal’i” or “Qul’ay.” This sword is one of the three swords which Muhammad acquired as booty from the Banu Qaynaqa. . Inscribed in Arabic on its blade above the handle is: “This is the noble sword of the house of Muhammad the prophet, the apostle of God.” The blade of this sword is distinguished from the other swords because of its wave-like design. Now the sword is preserved in the Topkapi Museum, Istanbul. Its length is 114 cm, the length of its handle is 13 cm, the length of the blade is 91 cm, and the width at the handle is 5.5 cm and the tip is 4.5 cm.
- Dhu al-Faqar (Arabic: الفَقَار) was taken as booty by Muhammad at the Battle of Badr. The length of the sword with the handle is 104 cm, the length of the handle is 15 cm, the length of the blade is 89 cm, and the width at the handle is 6 cm and at the tip is 4.5 cm.
- Al-Mikhdham (Arabic: المِخذَم, meaning "segments of part of the main body or vertebrae") is now in the Topkapi Museum, Istanbul. The blade is 97 cm in length.
- Al-Qadib (Arabic: القَضيب, meaning "rod, staff") is a thin-bladed sword which was a sword of defense or companionship for the traveller but not used to battle. Written on the side of the sword in silver is the inscription: “There is no god but Allah (God), Muhammad is the Messenger of Allah (God) – Muhammad Ibn Abd Allah Ibn Abd Al-Muttalib.” There is no indication in any historical source that this sword was used in any battle. It stayed in the house of Muhammad. The length of the sword is 100 cm, the length of the blade is 86 cm, the length of its handle is 14 cm, and its width at the handle is 2.8 cm, and at the shrew is 2.2 cm, and has a scabbard of dyed animal hide. This sword is housed in the Topkapi Museum, Istanbul.

=== Quiver ===
Muhammad had a quiver, Al-Kafur (Arabic: الكافور). This quiver had a strap made from tanned skin. This quiver had also three silver circular rings, a buckle, and an edge made of silver.

=== Bows ===
Muhammad owned 6 bows.

- Az-Zawra (Arabic: الزوراء)
- Ar-Rauha (Arabic: الروحاء)
- As-Safra (Arabic: الصفراء)
- Al-Bayda' (Arabic: البيضاء)
- Al-Katum (Arabic: الكتوم): This bow broke during the Battle of Uhud and later was taken by Qatadah bin an-Nu’man
- As-Saddad (Arabic: السداد)

=== Spears ===
Muhammad owned five spears:

- Al-Muthwi (Arabic: المثوي)
- Al-Muthni (Arabic: المثنى)
- An-Na'bah (Arabic: النعبة): a small spear
- Al-Bayda' (Arabic: البيضاء) a bigger spear
- Anazah (Arabic: العنزة): a short lance, which Muhammad held while attending the ‘Id festivals, and used to place in front of him when he led the prayer, using it as a sutrah. Sometimes, Muhammad walked while holding the ‘Anazah.

== Armor ==
=== Body armor ===
Muhammad had seven pieces of body armor

- Dhat al-Fudul (Arabic: ذات الفضول), which he pawned with Abu ash-Shahm, a Jew, in return for some 30 sa’ (weights relate to food) of barley for his family. The debt was for a year. This armor was made of iron.
- Dhat al-Wishah (Arabic: ذات الوشاح)
- Dhat al-Hawashi (Arabic: ذات الحواشي)
- As-Sa’diyyah (Arabic: السعدية)
- Fiddah (Arabic: فضة)
- Al-Batra (Arabic: البتراء)
- Al-Khirniq (Arabic: الخرنق)

=== Helmets ===
Muhammad had several helmets:

- Al-Muwashah (Arabic: الموشح): a helmet made of iron, adorned with copper.
- As-Sabugh (Arabic: السبوغ) or Dhu as-Sabugh (Arabic: ذو السبوغ)

=== Shields ===
Muhammad had several shields:

- Az-Zalluq (Arabic: الْزَلُوق)
- Al-Futaq (Arabic: الفتق) was given to Muhammad as a gift, It is also said that there was a picture of a statue on the shield. Muhammad always placed his hand on the image of the statue on his shield. Allah made the image fade away.

== Clothing and accessories ==
Muhammad owned three long shirts (jubbas in Arabic) which he wore during battle. In one of the narrations from Ahmad, he said that it is allowed to wear silk during war.

Accessory items included:

- Al-'Uqab (Arabic: العقاب): a black banner or flag. According to hadith of Abu Dawud's "Sunan" from one of the Companions who said: "I saw the Prophet’s banner, it was yellow."
- White banners that were sometimes mixed with black.
- A pavilion called Al-Kann (Arabic: الكن), and a crook that was one cubit's length long which Muhammad would carry while walking or riding.
- A baton called Al-'Arjun.
- A staff called Al-Mamshuq.

== Descriptions ==
The 9th-century Emir Ahmad Ibn Tulun mentioned in his book “Mufākahat al-Khullān fī Hawādith Az-Zamān”, in the incidents of the year 19 AH (640 CE) and 900 AH (1500 CE) that some claimed that they had a mug and some crutches of Muhammad and that “it was found that they are not of the possessions of the Prophet Muhammad, but rather they are the fragments of al-Layth ibn Sa'd."

The 15th-century scholar al-Suyuti said, on the authority of Muhammad (his garment):

"This (the possessions) was used by the caliphs to inherit it and put it on their shoulders in processions sitting and riding, and it was on the able-bodied when he was killed and contaminated with blood, and I think it was lost in the temptation of the Tatars, for we belong to Allah and to Him we shall return."

The modern scholar Ahmed Taymour says - after listing the remnants attributed to Muhammad in Istanbul:

"It is no secret that some of these remnants are likely to be true. However, we did not see any of the trustworthy people who mentioned it with proof or denial, for Allah, Glory be to Him, who knows about it best, and some of them cannot conceal what the idea or notion that stumbles on of suspicion and disputes it in doubts."

== See also ==
- Relics of Muhammad
- Sacred Relics (Topkapı Palace)
- Bayt al-Mawlid, the house where Muhammad is believed to have been born.
