= Haudha ibn Ali =

Haudha ibn Ali al-Hanafi
- King of al-Yamamah
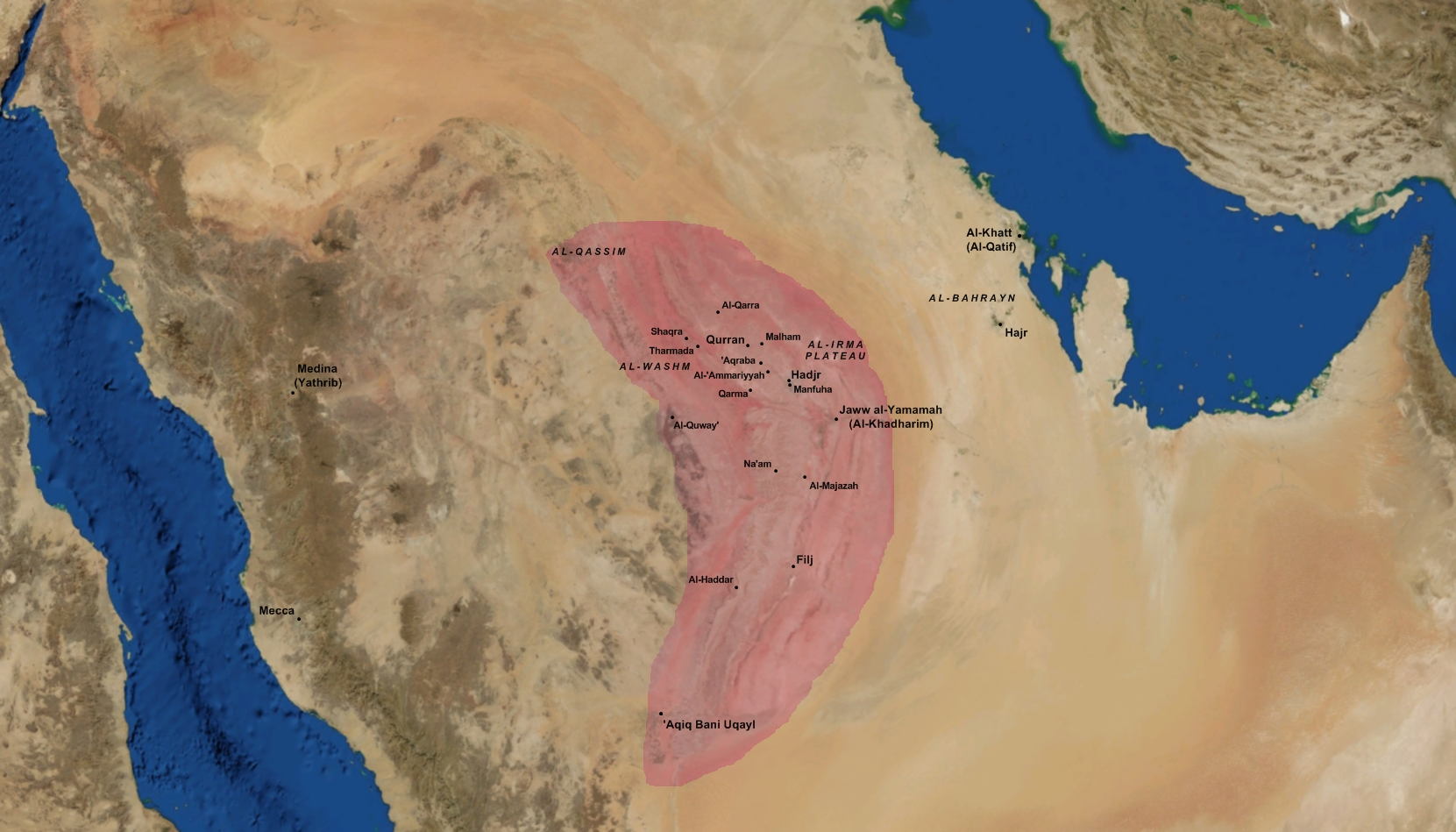
- The domains where Haudha ibn Ali ruled until his death in 629 CE
- Reign: c. 560–629 CE
- Died: c. 629 CE
Names
- Haudha ibn Ali ibn Thumama ibn 'Amr ibn 'Abd al-Uzza ibn Suhaym ibn Murrah ibn al-Dawla ibn Hanifa ibn Lajim ibn Sa'ab ibn Ali ibn Bakr ibn Wa'il
- Religion: Christianity

Haudha ibn Ali al-Hanafi (Arabic: هوذة بن علي الحنفي, born 551 CE) (also spelled Hawdha or Hawza) was the ruler of Al-Yamama who reigned in the 7th century CE and considered the most powerful man of Central Arabia in his time. A poet and preacher, Haudha was a Christian. He was from the tribe of Banu Hanifa and traced his lineage back to the Banu Bakr tribe. Haudha was also a contemporary of Khosrow I and the Islamic prophet Muhammad.

== Lineage ==
According to Ibn Hazm, his full name is Haudha ibn Ali ibn Thumama ibn 'Amr ibn 'Abd al-Uzza ibn Suhaym ibn Murrah ibn al-Dawla ibn Hanifa ibn Lajim ibn Sa'ab ibn Ali ibn Bakr ibn Wa'il, and his lineage can be traced to Adnan.

== Biography ==
Haudha ibn Ali was born in 551 CE to a Christian family of the Banu Hanifa tribe.

=== Involvement in Yawm al-Safqa ===
On a day known as Yawm al-Safqa, Haudha ibn Ali's caravan was robbed by the Banu Tamim tribe while transporting Persian goods to Yemen and then imprisoned until he was able to ransom himself out of custody. He managed to incite Khosrow I against the Banu Tamim, and soon the armies of the Sasanian Empire arrived to Arabia where a large number of people from the Banu Tamim tribe were massacred.

== Reign ==
Haudha ibn Ali had already been placed on the throne by 628 CE. Around that time, the Islamic prophet Muhammad had begun sending messages to contemporary rulers, inviting them into the Islamic faith. Haudha was amongst these rulers. One of the Sahaba by the name of Sulayt ibn Amr sent to Haudha a letter from Muhammad himself:

Bismillahir Rahmanir Raheem! From Muhammad, the Messenger of God, to Haudha ibn Ali! Peace be upon those who are on the right path. You should know it very well that my religion will soon glitter on the furthest horizons. Therefore, O Haudha, become a Muslim so that you will reach salvation. Then, I will let you rule your country.

Haudha ibn Ali reacted with humour towards the letter, and kindly refused to accept the invitation. He then wrote the following reply back to Muhammad:

What you have invited me to, it is splendid. I am the orator; the poet of my nation. My nation is feared by Arabs. Give me a position of authority in your government, so that I may obey you.

According to Islamic tradition, Haudha died a year after he had sent the letter, circa 629 CE.

== See also ==
- Diplomatic career of Muhammad
