= Kirka Sharif =

Islamic shrine in Kandahar, Afghanistan

Khirka Sharif
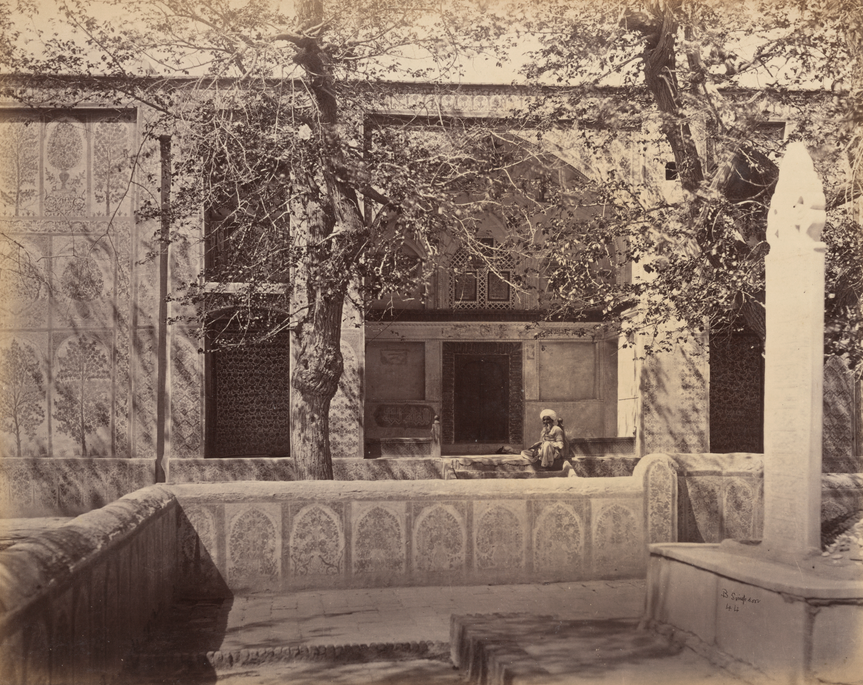
- Khirka Sharif, c. 1878 – c. 1880 CE

- Location of the shrine in Afghanistan

Religion
- Affiliation: Islam
- Ecclesiastical or organisational status: Shrine and Friday mosque
- Status: Active

Location
- Location: Kandahar, Kandahar District, Kandahar Province
- Country: Afghanistan
- Coordinates: 31°37′11″N 65°42′29″E

Architecture
- Type: Islamic
- Style: Afghan
- Completed: c. 18th century CE

The Khirka Sharif (Pashto: خرقه شريفه, romanized: Khirqa Sharīfa; transl. Sacred Cloak) is an Islamic building complex located in the center of Kandahar, Afghanistan. The complex, which includes gardens and the local congregational mosque, became notable in English literature during the Second Anglo-Afghan War, when British India was trying to establish friendship with Afghanistan. The complex houses a khirqa (believed to be the cloak of Muhammad) as worn by the Islamic prophet Muhammad during the Night Journey in 621 AH (1224/1225 CE).

== Cloak of Muhammed ==
This cloak reached the Khirka Sharif complex in Kandahar when it was donated by the 18th-century Afghan ruler Ahmad Shah Durrani, the father of modern Afghanistan and founder of the Durrani Empire. The sacred Muslim object itself had been given to Ahmad Shah by the amir of Bukhara around 1768. The cloak is said to have been worn by the Islamic prophet Muhammad during the famous Isra' and Mi'raj, or Night Journey, in the year 621. It is one of the most revered relics in the Muslim world.

== Friday Mosque ==
The building containing the Khirka Sharif sits next to the historical Friday Mosque of Kandahar. The mosque's design follows many principles of Islamic architecture and local customs, with the interior being decorated and carved with green marble from Helmand region of Afghanistan. In addition, it has tiles that are mirrored with gilded detailing. The mosque also has a large courtyard and gravestone located on the premises of the Khirka Sharif building. The walls of the building are decorated with carvings, common in many Islamic mosques. The carvings of this mosque have trees and other foliage, and the designs are unique to each wall.

== Mausoleum of Ahmad Shah ==
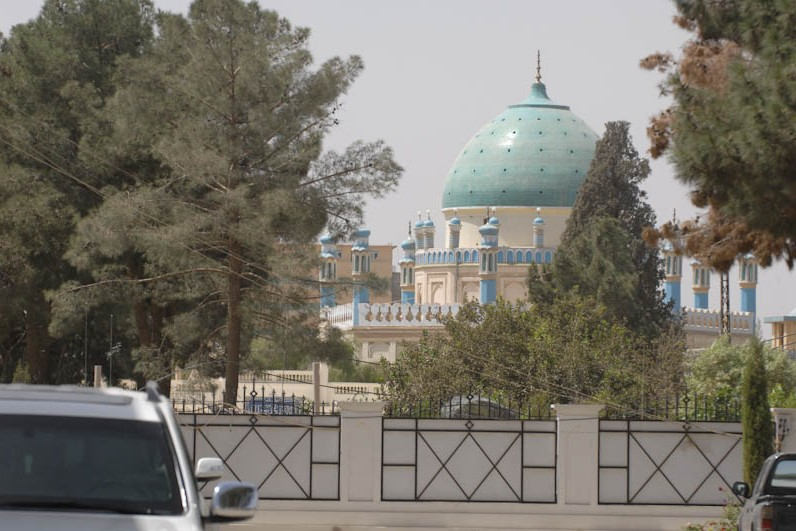
Mausoleum of Ahmad Shah Durrani nearby Khirka Sharif

A short walking distance to the back of the building housing the Khirka Sharif is the Mausoleum of Ahmad Shah Durrani.

== See also ==
- Islam in Afghanistan
- List of mosques in Afghanistan
