= Salit (name) =

Salit is both a given name and a surname. Notable people with the name include:

- Jacqueline Salit, leader of the Independent voting movement
- Norman Salit (1896-1960), American lawyer, rabbi, and Zionist
- Salit bin 'Amr 'Ala bin Hadrami, 7th-century Muslim emissary to Bahrain
