= Jihadist flag =

Flag used by various Islamist Groups

Flag used by various Islamist organisations (since the late 1990s) with the white text of the Shahada on a black background

The jihadist flag is a flag commonly used by various Islamist and Islamic fundamentalist movements as a symbol of jihad. It usually consists of the Black Standard with a white text of the Shahada (Islamic declaration of faith) emblazoned across it in Arabic calligraphy. Its usage is asserted to be adopted by Islamist groups and jihadists during the 1990s and early 2000s. Organizations who use jihadist flags include al-Qaeda, al-Shabaab, the Taliban, Palestinian Islamic Jihad, the al-Qassam Brigades and Jemaah Islamiyah.

Flag used by the Taliban

== Muqwaki seal variant ==
The flag of the Islamic State uses the seal of Muhammad design

The variant used by the Islamic State, al-Qaeda in the Arabian Peninsula, al-Qaeda in the Islamic Maghreb, Islamic State of Iraq, Boko Haram, Jama'at Nasr al-Islam wal-Muslimin, and al-Shabaab depicts the Muqwaki variant of the alleged seal of Muhammad, which some scholars consider to be an anachronistic forgery.

=== Legality ===
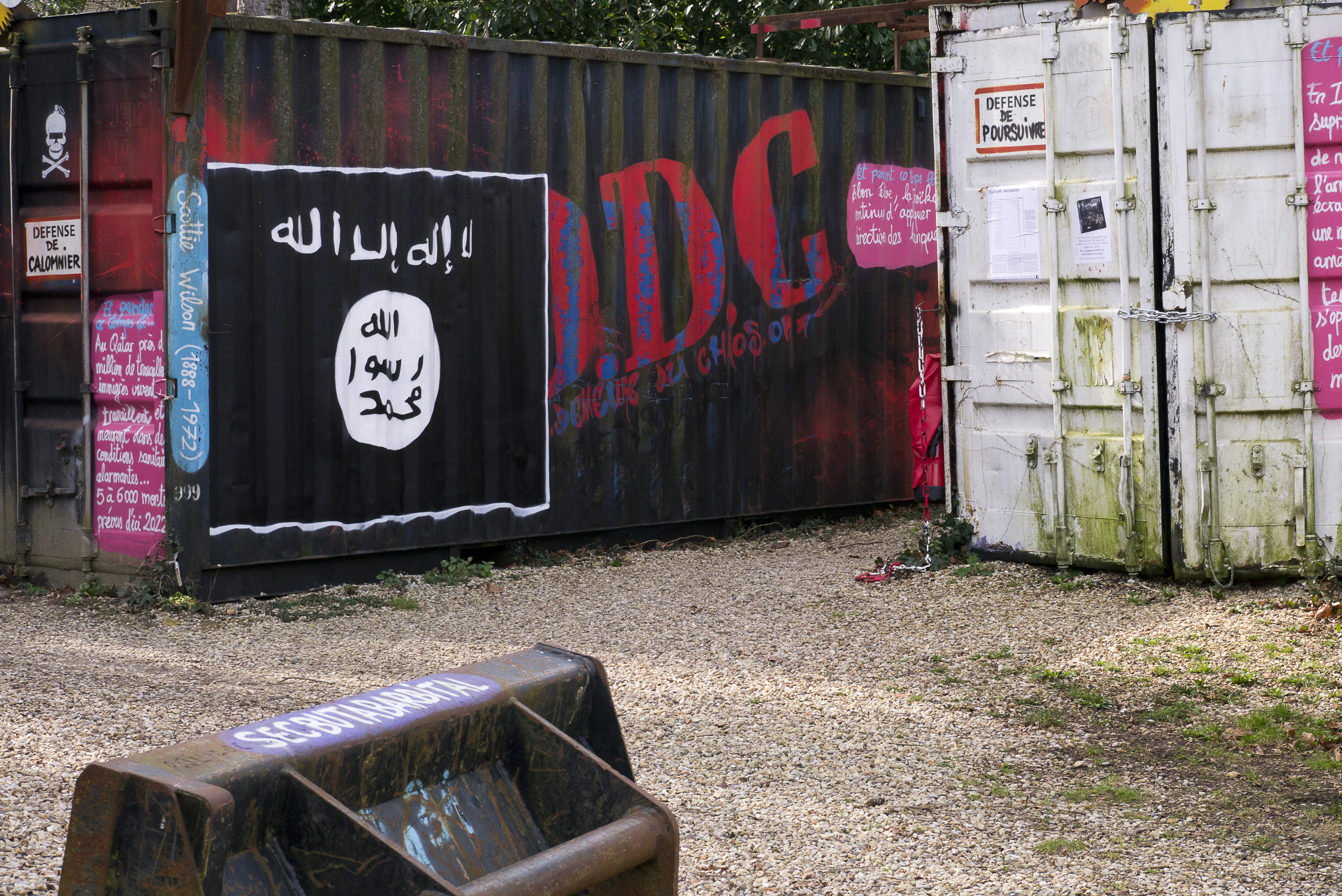
Flag of Islamic State graffiti, St.-Romain-au-Mont-d'Or, Rhone-Alpes, France

In August 2014, British Prime Minister David Cameron suggested that anybody displaying "the Islamic State flag" in the United Kingdom should be arrested. Citing the Terrorism Act 2000, section 13 (1b) of the act states "[a] person in a public place commits an offence if he wears, carries or displays an article in such a way or in such circumstances as to arouse reasonable suspicion that he is a member or supporter of a proscribed organisation" and can face six months in prison or a statutory fine.

The use of the image of the Seal of Muhammad Jihadist Flag "ISIS flag" (but not other versions of the Black Standard) for non-educational purposes has been forbidden in Germany by the Federal Ministry of the Interior since September 2014. Neighbouring Austria proposed a ban in the same month.

== See also ==
- Black Banner Organization
- List of black flags
- Flag of the Islamic State
