= Mausoleum of Timur Shah Durrani =

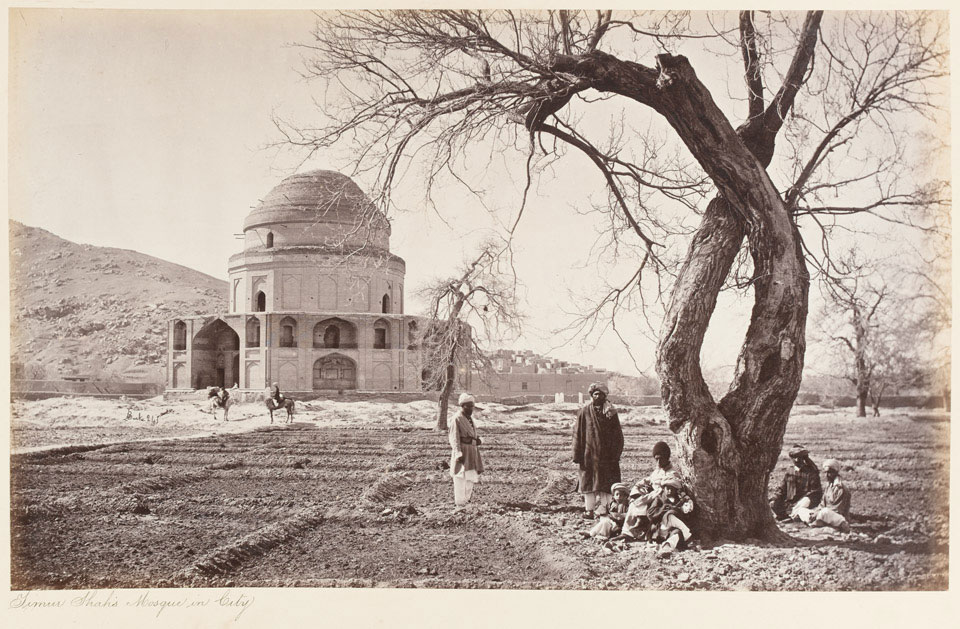
- The mausoleum in the winter of 1879
- Interactive map of Mausoleum of Timur Shah Durrani
- Location: Kabul, Afghanistan
- Coordinates: 34.516401°N 69.175368°E

The Mausoleum of Timur Shah Durrani (Maqbara-i-Timur Shah) is one of many tourist attractions in Kabul, Afghanistan. It is located next to the Kabul River on Timur Shah Road in the busy shopping area of the city. It is a 1 ha (2.5 acres) historical park containing the mausoleum of Timur Shah Durrani, the second Emir of the Durrani Empire, from 1772 to 1793. Next to the park is Ayesha Durrani High School.

Timur Shah is known for transferring the capital of Afghanistan from Kandahar to Kabul in 1776. After Timur Shah died his son Zaman Shah Durrani built the mausoleum. It was heavily damaged during the 1990s Afghan Civil War. The building and its gardens were fully restored with the aid of the Aga Khan Development Network in 2012. On 19 October 2012, former Afghan President Hamid Karzai and Shah Karim al-Hussaini (Aga Khan IV) together re-opened the mausoleum to the public.

== See also ==
- Mausoleum of Ahmad Shah Durrani in Kandahar
- Tourism in Afghanistan
