= Sacred Relics (Topkapı Palace) =

Islamic religious relics

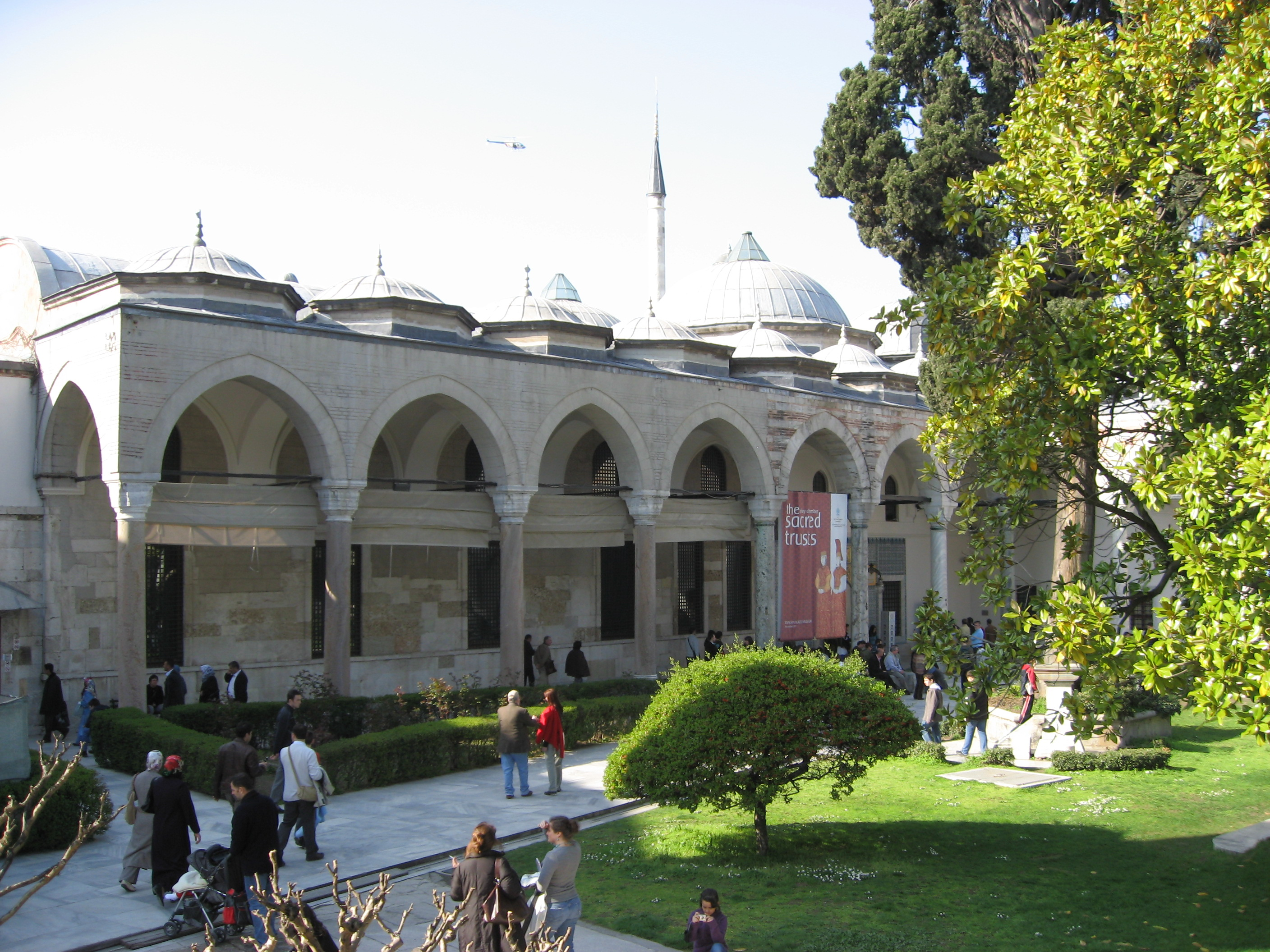
The Sacred Trust is kept in the former Privy Chamber in Topkapı Palace

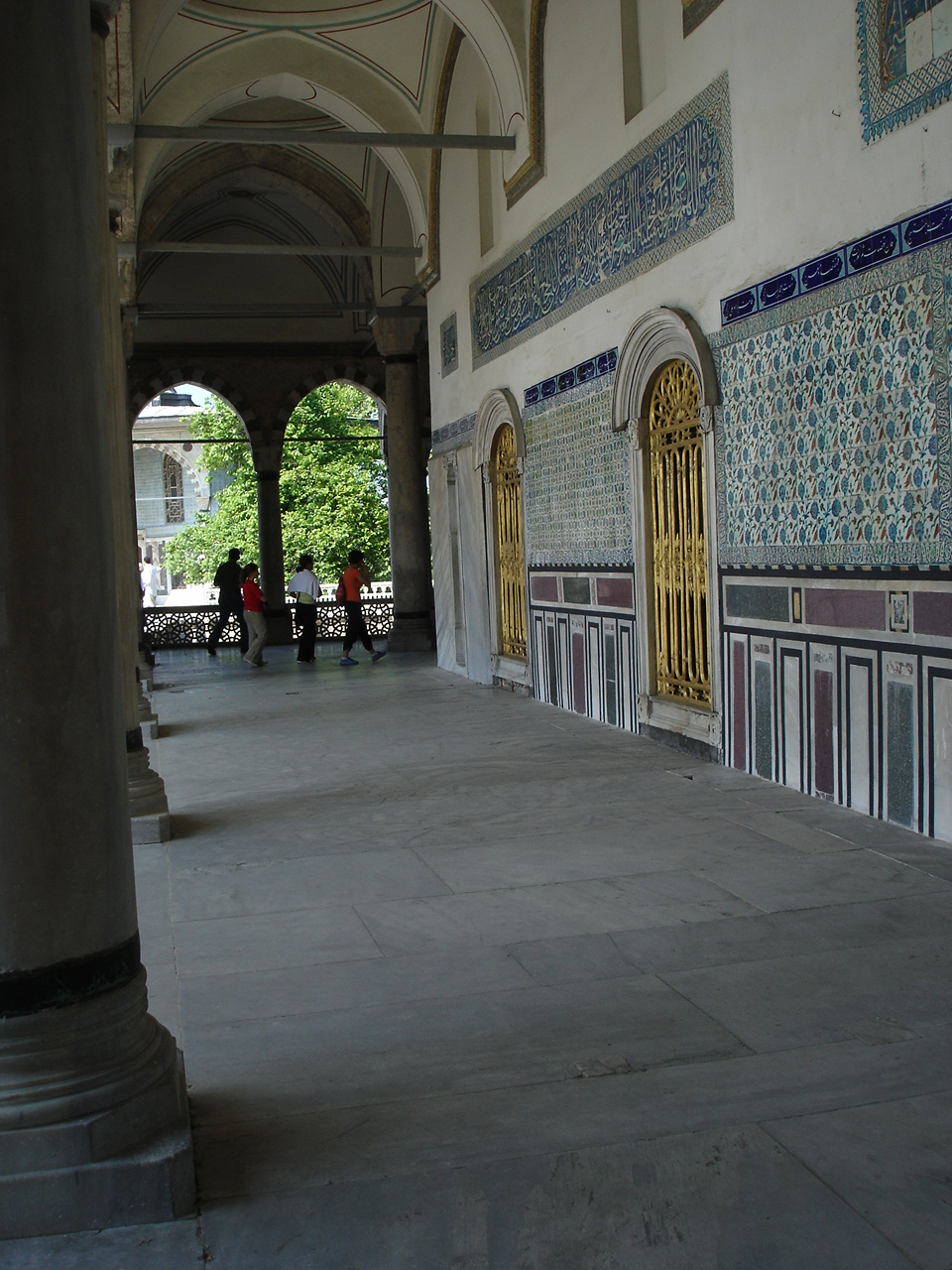
The Chamber of the Blessed Mantle, from the Fourth Courtyard

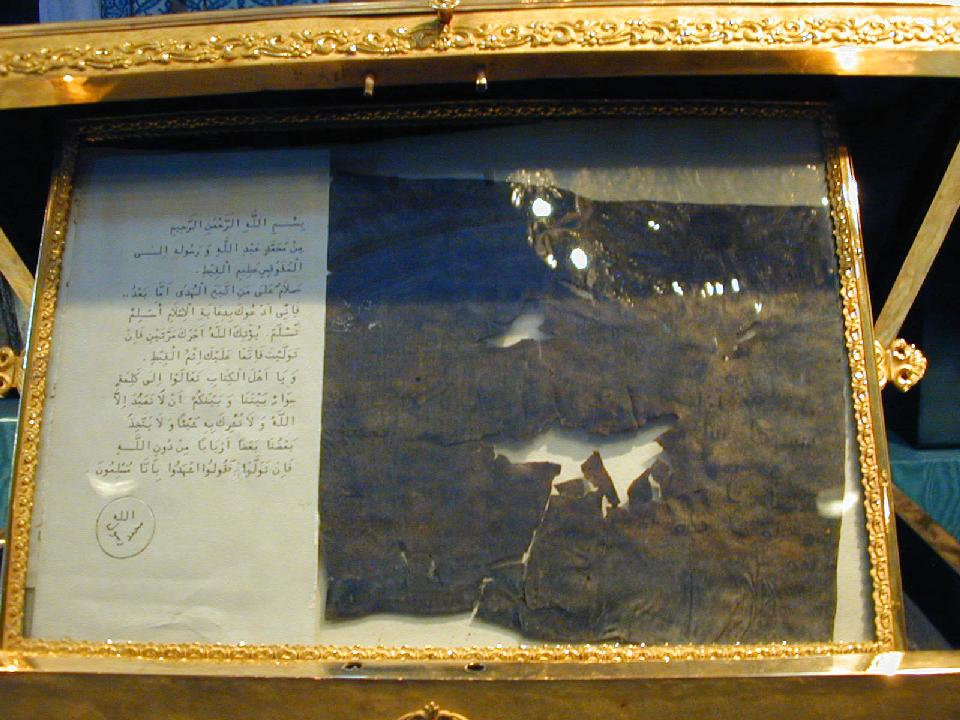
Letter by Muhammad

The Islamic Sacred Relics (Turkish: Mukaddes emanetler), also known as the Holy Relics, known collectively as the Sacred Trust, consist of religious relics sent to the Ottoman Sultans between the 16th century to the late 19th century.

With the conquest of the Arab world by Sultan Selim I (1517), the Caliphate passed from the long-vanquished Abbasids to the Ottoman sultans. The Islamic prophet Muhammad’s mantle, which was kept by the last Abbasid Caliph Mutawakkil III, was given to Selim I.

The various Relics of Muhammad, his followers, and other items purportedly associated with Muhammad were brought to Topkapı Palace in Istanbul, where they remain to this day.

The relics are housed in the former private chambers of the sultan, the Privy Chambers, which are located in the Third Courtyard of the palace.

- The Destimal Chamber is the room in which Abraham's Pot, Joseph's Turban, the Staff of Moses, David's Sword, scrolls belonging to John the Baptist, and Muhammad's footprint are on display.
- The Şadırvanlı Sofa is the room where the keys to the Kaaba, gutters of the Kaaba, the casing of the Black Stone (Hacerü'l-Esved), the Door of Repentance, and the swords of Muhammad's companions are on display.
- The Audience Chamber, also known as the House of Petitions (Arzhane) houses a piece from a tooth of Muhammad (Dendan-ı Saadet), hair from the beard of Muhammad (Sakal-ı Şerif), the Seal of Muhammad (Mühr-ı Saadet), an autographed Letter of Muhammad (Name-ı Saadet), and Muhammad's swords and bow in their exclusive reliquary made by Ottoman goldsmiths. These are known as the Sacred Trusts (mukkades emanetler). The Qur'an is recited continuously by a mufti in this chamber.
- The Chamber of the Blessed Mantle houses the Blessed Mantle and the Holy Banner of Muhammad, in their golden chests beneath a latticed silver canopy.

== Blessed Mantle ==
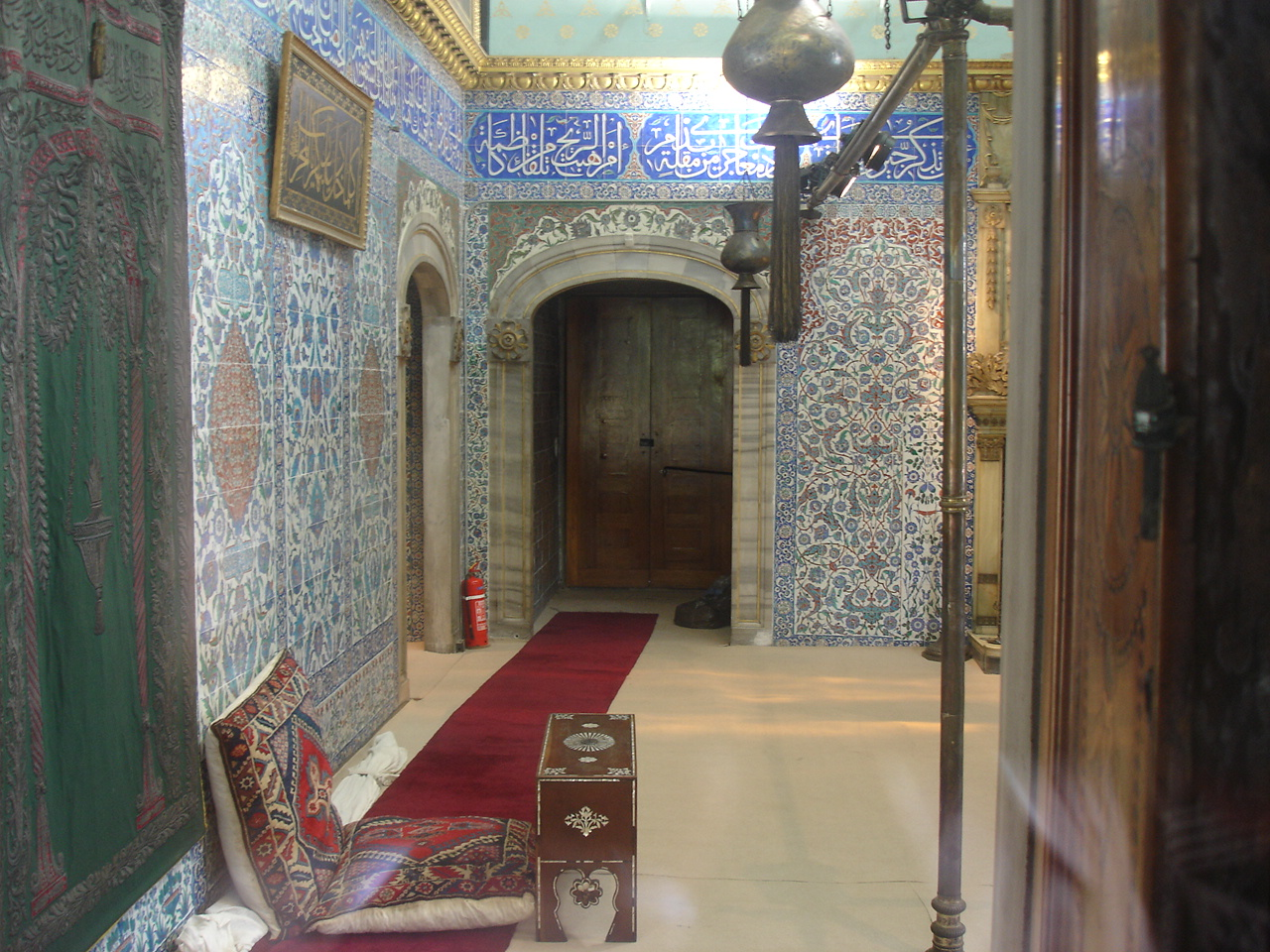
Inside the Chamber of the Blessed Mantle

The Blessed Mantle, also known as the Holy Mantle, according to tradition was given by Muhammad to the poet Ka'b bin Zuhayr. The poet's poem Kasida-ı Burda, praising Muhammad, decorates the Room of the Blessed Mantle. The mantle is almost two yards long and made of black wool lined with a cream-colored fabric.

Traditionally the mantle was visited by the sultan, his family, and the court during a ceremony on the fifteenth day of Ramadan each year. During the ceremony the mantle was kissed. This was not done directly, but a piece of muslin was placed over the vestment. This decorated kerchief, called the Noble Kerchief (destimal-ı şerif), was provided to each person by the Agha of the Muslin (Tülbent Ağası).

The mantle was kept in a golden box, to which only the sultan had the keys. The box was opened while he intoned the Basmala. The mantle was actually wrapped in a number of square pieces of cloth called bohças. In it was another small golden box in which forty bohças were wrapped around the mantle itself. The number forty was considered especially auspicious.

The Agha of the Muslin placed the first kerchief on the mantle and the sultan kissed it, followed by the imperial princes, viziers, officials, male attendants, and eunuchs. This was done while Qur'anic chants filled the chamber.

Then followed the women, who were led by the Queen Mother, followed by the chief consorts, concubines, and daughters of the sultan, as well as the wives of all officials present and female attendants. Princess Imperial Hamide Ayşe Sultan, daughter of Sultan Abdul Hamid II, gave a rare eyewitness account in her book “Babam Abdülhamit” (My Father, Abdülhamit), Istanbul, 1960. This passage by Ayşe Sultan provides an intimate glimpse of Abdülhamit II and her life as his daughter:

We began to prepare three days before the visit to the Blessed Mantle, on the fifteenth day of Ramazan. We got up early that day, wore our most beautiful long-skirted ceremonial dresses, put on our jewels, and went to Topkapı. My grandmother got into a carriage of the sultanate; the drivers wore the embroidered uniforms of the royal stable, like the drivers of the padishah. Halim Efendi, who was the officer in charge of harem outings, was in front with the guards. The harem ağas, wearing embroidered uniforms, followed the carriage of my grandmother, which was in front. Thus, we left Yıldız and went to Topkapı. There we were met by old female attendants who came from Dolmabahçe, and we went to the room assigned to each of us in Topkapı. All those outside the palace to whom the invitation had previously gone, the married sultans [the ruler’s daughters were called sultan] and the wives of the ministers also came. We invited the people we knew personally.

In the room called the Room of the Armchair my grandmother sat under a canopy in her royal costume, and all of us went and kissed her hand. All together we waited for the opening of the Pavilion of the Blessed Mantle. Sultan Abülmecit’s wives [he was a deceased sultan], Serfiraz and Şayeste, were there too and sat beside my grandmother. Usually, the valide paşa [the mother of the khedive of Egypt] was at the ceremony.

The baş musahip [the head harem eunuch in attendance on the sultan] came to the harem when the Blessed Mantle was opened and, with an Oriental salute, gave the news to my grandmother, the valide sultan. The valide sultan rose, and after her walked the wives of Abdülmecit and then the sultans and the kadın efendis, all in order of precedence, and we all went to the Pavilion of the Blessed Mantle. Everyone wore a piece of white muslin on her head. We sensed odours, because incense was burning everywhere, and from behind a curtain came the Noble Qur'an read in an extremely beautiful voice by the muezzin. The hearts of all of us filled with deep and humble reverence, with slow steps, our skirts sweeping the ground, we walked in ranks until we came in front of the padishah who stood at the foot of the throne. [This is the only mention of a throne in connection with the visit to the Blessed Mantle.] With an Oriental salute from the ground ... we took the noble kerchief which was given into our hands, kissed it, put it over our heads, withdrew backward, and went and again stood in our ranks according to precedence. ...

The young princes, the sons of the padishah, stood in rank in uniform at the foot of the throne.

After us the valide paşa and the wives of the grand vizier, the other ministers and the şeyhülislâm entered. The lady treasurer and the other palace servants also participated in the ceremony. At the end of the ceremony the baş musahip appeared, gave an Oriental salute from the ground, and we left in ranks as we had entered, the valide sultan in front.

Our carriages drew up to the Harem Gate [Carriage Gate] of Topkapi in order of precedence, and we mounted them and returned to Yıldız Palace in the same formation as we had left it. These carriages, which proceeded slowly because of the horses, usually brought us to the palace at the time of the iftar cannon [the cannon that announced the end of the day’s fast during Ramazan].

A button of the mantle was dipped in rose water. Drops of the rose water were poured into pitchers which in turn were given to important people. This water was called the Water of the Blessed Mantle (Hırka-ı Saadet Suyu) and was purported to have miraculous qualities. After the ceremony, the sultan had the mantle packed back into its forty bohças, the small golden box, the other bohças and then into the large golden box which itself was placed under the silver latticed canopy until next year.

== Holy Banner ==
The second most important relic is the Holy Banner, also known as the Sacred Standard of Muhammad (Sancak-ı Şerif, literally the "Noble Banner"). It is said to be the banner of Muhammad himself or at least to originate from his era. The origins of the Ottoman's acquisition of the relic is disputed. The banner was first used in a battle against the Austrian Habsburgs in 1593 and again for a war in Hungary in 1594. The banner was in Topkapı by 1595. After Mehmed III took the banner and won the Siege of Eger in 1596, the banner became a victory symbol for the Ottoman forces.

The banner was occasionally carried into battles to encourage troops and ensure victory. The banner would be taken out of its box by the sultan and affixed to a staff. He would carry it from the Chamber of the Holy Relics to the Throne Room while officials called out "Allahu Akbar!". After this, the banner was carried from the Throne Room to the Gate of Felicity and placed there. The grand vizier would receive the banner from the sultan in a ceremony in the Throne Room. While the grand vizier and the şeyhülislâm stood in attendance, the sultan would kiss the Holy Banner and entrust it to his grand vizier with the words: "I entrust the Sacred Standard to you and you to God. May He be your helper!" After a battle, the banner would be returned the same way with the sultan carrying it back to the chamber and putting it into its box, while Qur'anic chants were read aloud and incense burned.

The banner was also taken out when mutinies by Janissaries erupted in 1651 and for the last time in 1826.

== Literature ==
- Hilmi, Aydın (2004). The Sacred Trusts. Somerset, New Jersey: The Light, Inc. ISBN 1-932099-72-7.
- Necipoğlu, Gülru (1991). Architecture, ceremonial, and power: The Topkapi Palace in the fifteenth and sixteenth centuries. Cambridge, Massachusetts: The MIT Press. p. 336 pages. ISBN 0-262-14050-0.
- Fanny Davis. Palace of Topkapi in Istanbul. 1970. ASIN B000NP64Z2
