= Mausoleum of Ahmad Shah Durrani =

Tomb in Kandahar, Afghanistan

Coordinates: 31°37.177′N 65°42.436′E

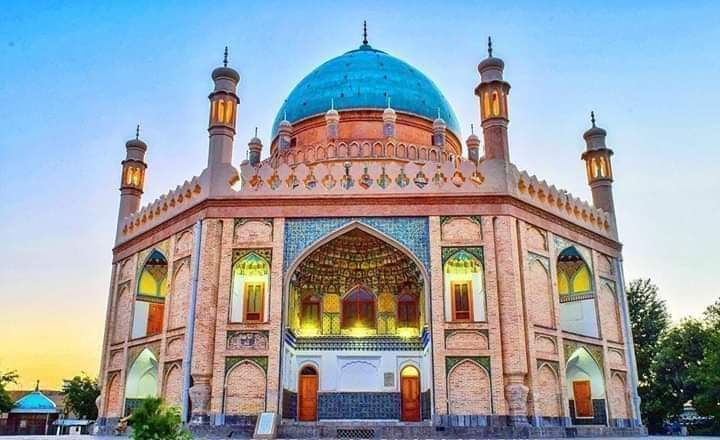
Mausoleum of Ahmad Shah Durrani in 2021

The Mausoleum of Ahmad Shah Durrani is located in Kandahar, Afghanistan. It is one of the most important historical monuments in Kandahar. Ahmad Shah Durrani, who is fondly known as Ahmad Shah Baba, ruled the Durrani Empire from Kandahar between 1747 and 1772.

The graceful octagonal monument stands on a basaltic platform, the plain beige brick exterior decorated with numerous niches of contrasting heights and depths, delicately outlined with yellow and green, green and blue, tile. Tall minarets connected by a floral balustrade top the main body of the monument and behind them yet another set of short minarets atop a series of shallow niches outlined in blue, surround a drum crowned with a dome of glistening blue tile. The soffits of the main arches are cleverly decorated in a honeycomb pattern composed of half circles centered with lapis lazuli and gold to resemble flowers.

The exterior decoration seems very spartan once one enters. Here, the eyes are delighted with a sumptuous richness of color and design from the gorgeous Afghan carpets on the marble floor to the brilliantly painted and gilded floral decoration of the dome. The blue-green tile with touches of yellow and brown around the base of the walls is made in Kandahar and is quite distinctive from the tile-work of Herat.

On the eight cornices under the corner niches a large inscription in white on lapis blue tile extolls the virtues of Emperor Ahmad Shah Durrani:

The King of high rank, Ahmad Shah Durrani,
Was equal to Kisra in managing the affairs of his government.
In his time, from the awe of his glory and greatness,
The lioness nourished the stag with her milk.
From all sides in the ear of his enemies there arrived
A thousand reproofs from the tongue of his dagger.
The date of his departure for the house of mortality
Was the year of the Hijra 1186 (1772 A.D.)

The sarcophagus is made of Afghan marble and covered with a gold-embroidered cloth of deep wine velvet. Beside this there is a table holding fine copies of the Quran and a glass cabinet containing a gold-inlaid helmet and gauntlets together with a sceptre inlaid in silver and embellished with a two-headed bird. It is with these that Ahmad Shah Durrani went forth to battle.

Within the compound is also the Friday Mosque with the Shrine of the Cloak, which is believed to be worn by the Islamic prophet Muhammad. It has switched hands until finally resting here.

== Gallery ==
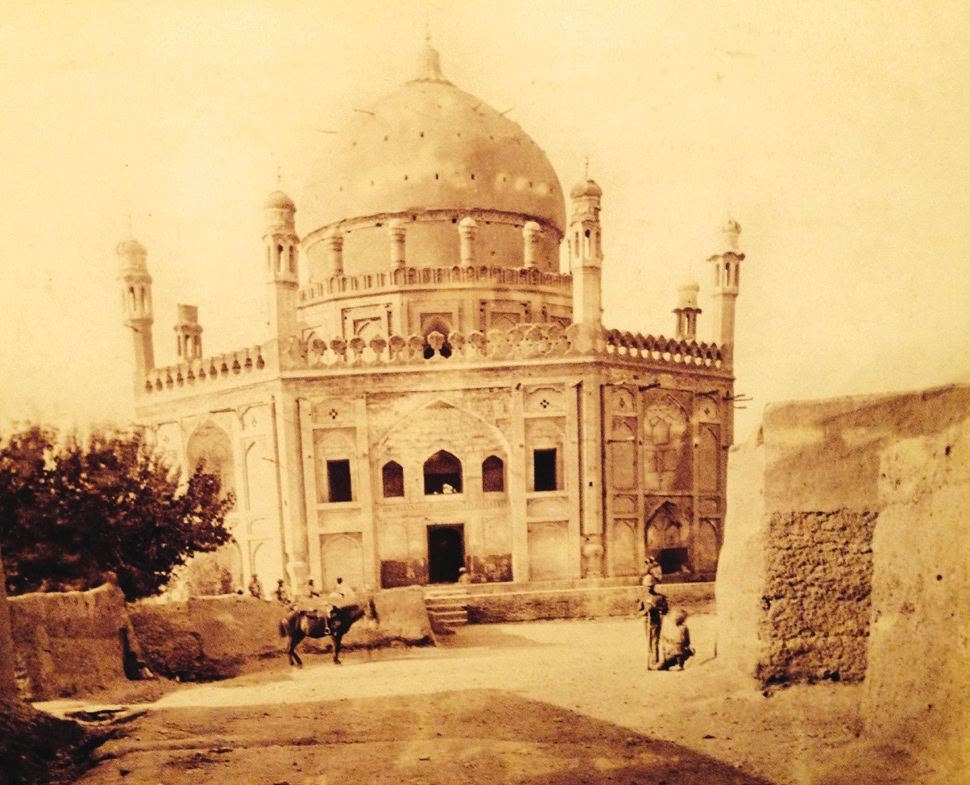
Photograph of the entrance to the tomb of Ahmad Shah Abdali in Kandahar, Afghanistan, by Benjamin Simpson, ca.1880

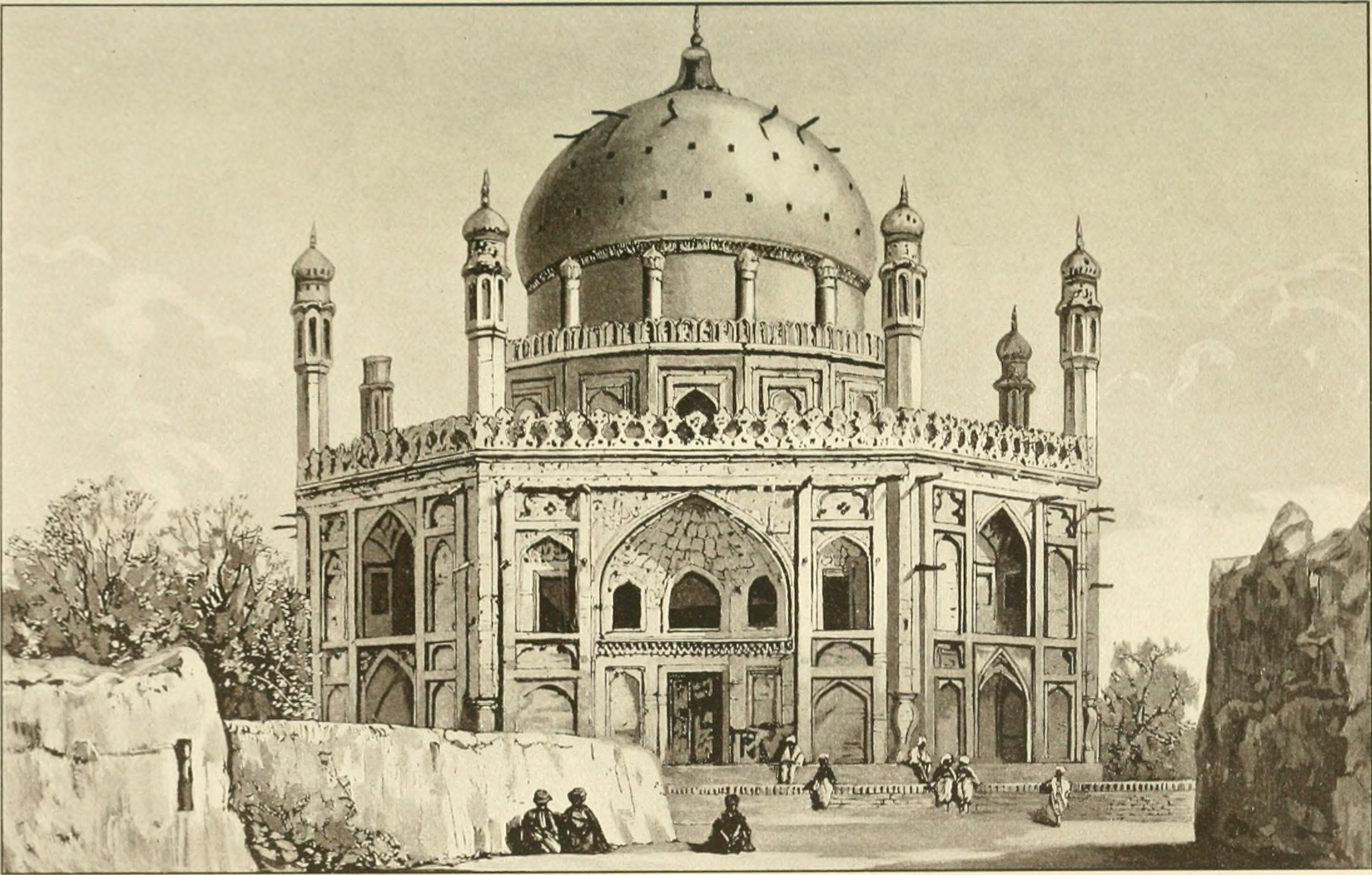
Mausoleum of Ahmad Shah Durrani in 1910

== See also ==
- Mausoleum of Timur Shah Durrani
