= Diplomatic career of Muhammad =

Aspect of Muhammad's life

The diplomatic career of Muhammad (c. 570 – 8 June 632) encompasses Muhammad's leadership over the growing Muslim community (Ummah) in early Arabia and his correspondences with the rulers of other nations in and around Arabia. This period was marked by the change from the customs of the period of Jahiliyyah in pre-Islamic Arabia to an early Islamic system of governance, while also setting the defining principles of Islamic jurisprudence in accordance with Sharia and an Islamic theocracy.

The two primary Arab tribes of Medina, the Aws and the Khazraj, had been battling each other for the control of Medina for more than a century before Muhammad's arrival. With the pledges of al-Aqaba, which took place near Mina, Muhammad was accepted as the common leader of Medina by the Aws and Khazraj and he addressed this by establishing the Constitution of Medina upon his arrival; a document which regulated interactions between the different factions, including the Arabian Jews of Medina, to which the signatories agreed. This was a different role for him, as he was only a religious leader during his time in Mecca. The result was the eventual formation of a united community in Medina, as well as the political supremacy of Muhammad, along with the beginning of a ten-year long diplomatic career.

In the final years before his death, Muhammad established communication with other leaders through letters, envoys, or by visiting them personally, such as at Ta'if; Muhammad intended to spread the message of Islam outside of Arabia. Instances of preserved written correspondence include letters to Heraclius, the Negus and Khosrow II, among other leaders. Although it is likely that Muhammad had initiated contact with other leaders within the Arabian Peninsula, some have questioned whether letters had been sent beyond these boundaries.

The main defining moments of Muhammad's career as a diplomat are the Pledges at al-Aqabah, the Constitution of Medina, and the Treaty of Hudaybiyyah. Muhammad reportedly used a silver seal on letters sent to other notable leaders which he sent as invitations to the religion of Islam.

== Early invitations to Islam ==
=== Migration to Abyssinia ===
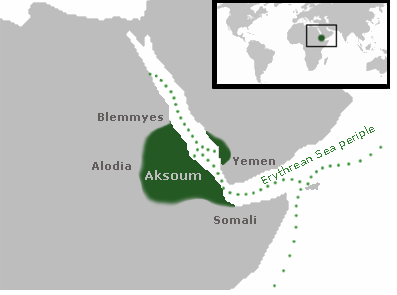
Location of the Kingdom of Aksum

Muhammad's commencement of public preaching brought him stiff opposition from the leading tribe of Mecca, the Quraysh. Although Muhammad himself was safe from persecution due to protection from his uncle, Abu Talib ibn Abd al-Muttalib, a leader of the Banu Hashim, one of the main clans that formed the Quraysh), some of his followers were not in such a position. Several Muslims were mistreated by the Quraysh; some were reportedly beaten, imprisoned, or starved. In 615, Muhammad resolved to send fifteen Muslims to emigrate to the Kingdom of Aksum to receive protection under the Christian ruler called Najashi in Muslim sources. Emigration was a means through which some of the Muslims could escape the difficulties and persecution faced at the hands of the Quraysh and it also opened up new trading prospects.

=== Ja'far ibn Abu Talib as Muhammad's ambassador ===
The Quraysh, on hearing the attempted emigration, dispatched a group led by 'Amr ibn al-'As and Abdullah ibn Abi Rabi'a ibn Mughira in order to pursue the fleeing Muslims. The Muslims reached Axum before they could capture them, and were able to seek the safety of the Negus in Harar. The Qurayshis appealed to the Negus to return the Muslims and they were summoned to an audience with the Negus and his bishops as a representative of Muhammad and the Muslims, Ja`far ibn Abī Tālib acted as the ambassador of the Muslims and spoke of Muhammad's achievements and quoted Qur'anic verses related to Islam and Christianity, including some from Surah Maryam. The Negus, seemingly impressed, consequently allowed the migrants to stay, sending back the emissaries of Quraysh. It is also thought that the Negus may have converted to Islam. The Christian subjects of the Negus were displeased with his actions, accusing him of leaving Christianity, although the Negus managed to appease them in a way which, according to Ibn Ishaq, could be described as favourable towards Islam. Having established friendly relations with the Negus, it became possible for Muhammad to send another group of migrants, such that the number of Muslims living in Abyssinia totalled around one hundred.

=== Pre-Hijra invitations to Islam ===
==== Ta'if ====
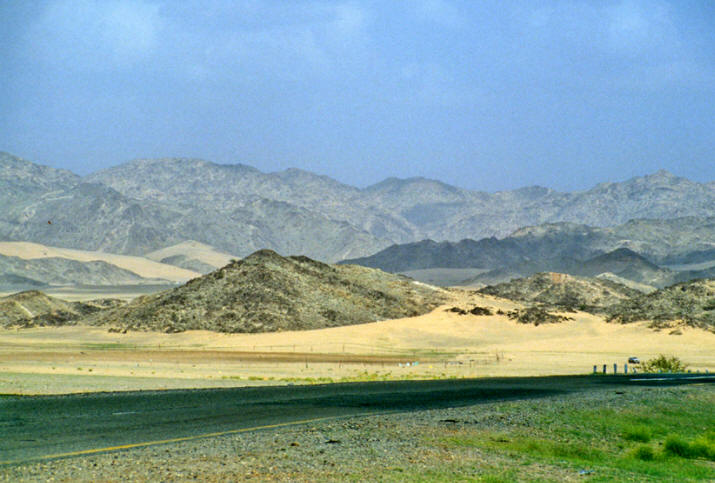
Road to Ta'if in the foreground, mountains of Ta'if in the background (Saudi Arabia)

In early June 619, Muhammad set out from Mecca to travel to Ta'if in order to convene with its chieftains, and mainly those of Banu Thaqif (such as 'Abd-Ya-Layl ibn 'Amr). The main dialogue during this visit is thought to have been the invitation by Muhammad for them to accept Islam, while contemporary historian Montgomery Watt observes the plausibility of an additional discussion about wresting the Meccan trade routes that passed through Ta'if from Meccan control. The reason for Muhammad directing his efforts towards Ta'if may have been due to the lack of positive response from the people of Mecca to his message until then.

In rejection of his message, and fearing that there would be reprisals from Mecca for having hosted Muhammad, the groups involved in meeting with Muhammad began to incite townsfolk to pelt him with stones. Having been beset and pursued out of Ta'if, the wounded Muhammad sought refuge in a nearby orchard. Resting under a grape vine, it is here that he invoked God, seeking comfort and protection.

According to Islamic tradition, Muhammad on his way back to Mecca was met by the angel Gabriel and the angels of the mountains surrounding Ta'if, and was told by them that if he willed, Ta'if would be crushed between the mountains in revenge for his mistreatment. Muhammad is said to have rejected the proposition, saying that he would pray in the hopes of succeeding generations of Ta'if coming to accept Islamic monotheism.

==== Pledges at al-'Aqaba ====
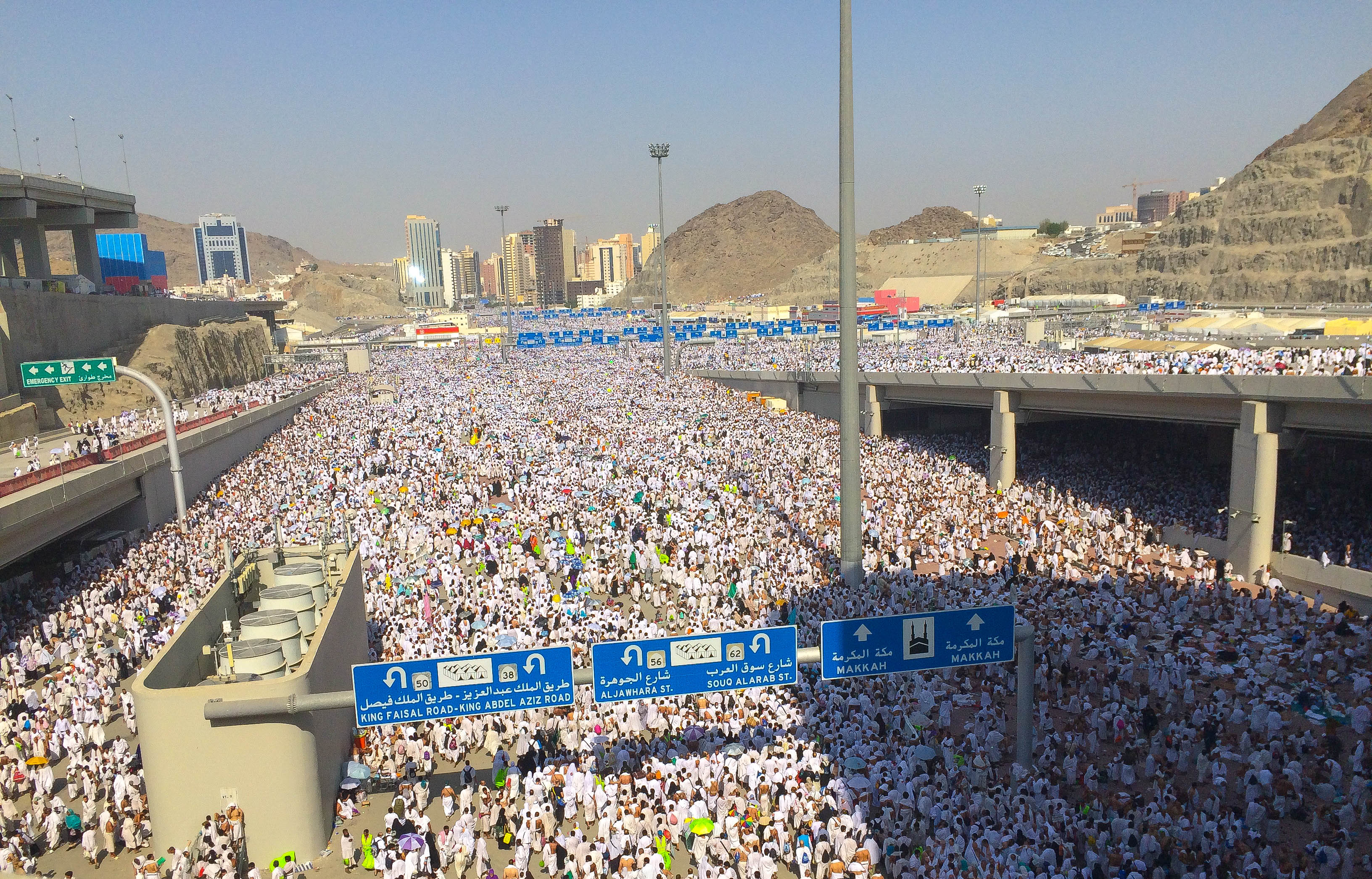
Hajj pilgrims at Mina

In the summer of 620 during the pilgrimage season, six men of the Khazraj travelling from Medina came into contact with Muhammad. Having been impressed by his message and character, and thinking that he could help bring resolution to the problems being faced in Medina, five of the six men returned to Mecca the following year bringing seven others. Following their conversion to Islam and attested belief in Muhammad as the messenger of God, the twelve men pledged to obey him and to stay away from a number of Islamically sinful acts. This is known as the First Pledge of al-'Aqaba by Islamic historians. Following the pledge, Muhammad decided to dispatch a Muslim ambassador to Medina and he chose Mus'ab ibn 'Umair for the position, in order to teach people about Islam and invite them to the religion.

With the slow but steady conversions from both the Aws and Khazraj present in Medina, 75 Medinan Muslims came as pilgrims to Mecca and secretly convened with Muhammad in June 621, meeting him at night. The group made to Muhammad the Second Pledge of al-'Aqaba, also known as the Pledge of War. The people of Medina agreed to the conditions of the first pledge, with new conditions including included obedience to Muhammad, the enjoinment of good and forbidding evil. They also agreed to help Muhammad in war and asked of him to declare war on the Meccans, but he refused.

Some western academics are noted to have questioned whether or not a second pledge had taken place, although Montgomery Watt argues that there must have been several meetings between the pilgrims and Muhammad on which the basis of his move to Medina could be agreed upon.

== Muhammad as the leader of Medina ==
=== Pre-Hijra Medinan society ===
The demography of Medina before Muslim migration consisted mainly of two pagan Arab tribes; the Aws and the Khazraj; and at least three Jewish tribes: the Qaynuqa, Nadir, and Qurayza. Medinan society, for perhaps decades, had been scarred by feuds between the two main Arab tribes and their sub-clans. The Jewish tribes had at times formed their own alliances with either one of the Arab tribes. The oppressive policy of the Khazraj who at the time had assumed control over Medina, forced the Jewish tribes, Nadir and Qurayza, into an alliance with the Aws, who had been significantly weakened. The culmination of this was the Battle of Bu'ath in 617, in which the Khazraj and their allies, the Qaynuqa, had been soundly defeated by the coalition of Aws and its supporters.

Although formal combat between the two clans had ended, hostilities between them continued even up until Muhammad's arrival in Medina. Muhammad had been invited by some Medinans, who had been impressed by his religious preaching and manifest trustworthiness, as an arbitrator to help reduce the prevailing factional discord. Muhammad's task would thus be to form a united community out of these heterogeneous elements, not only as a religious preacher, but as a political and diplomatic leader who could help resolve the ongoing disputes. The culmination of this was the Constitution of Medina.

=== Constitution of Medina ===
Parties Involved in the Document

After the pledges at al-'Aqaba, Muhammad received promises of protection from the people of Medina and he migrated to Medina with a group of his followers in 622, having escaped the forces of Quraysh. They were given shelter by members of the indigenous community known as the Ansar. After having established the first mosque in Medina (the Masjid an-Nabawi) and obtaining residence with Abu Ayyub al-Ansari, he set about the establishment of a pact known as the Constitution of Medina (Arabic: صحيفة المدينة, romanized: Sahifat ul-Madinah, lit. 'Charter of Medina'). This document was a unilateral declaration by Muhammad, and deals almost exclusively with the civil and political relations of the citizens among themselves and with the outside.

The Constitution, among other terms, declared:

- the formation of a nation of Muslims (Ummah) consisting of the Muhajirun from the Quraysh, the Ansar of Yathrib (Medina) and other Muslims of Yathrib.
- the establishment of a system of prisoner exchange in which the rich were no longer treated differently from the poor (as was the custom in pre-Islamic Arabia)
- all the signatories would unite as one in the defense of the city of Medina, declared the Jews of Aws equal to the Muslims, as long as they were loyal to the charter.
- the protection of Jews from religious persecution
- that the declaration of war can only be made by Muhammad.

==== Impact of the Constitution ====
The source of authority was transferred from public opinion to God. Bernard Lewis writes the community at Medina became a new kind of tribe with Muhammad as its sheikh, while at the same time having a religious character. Watt argues that Muhammad's authority had not extended over the entirety of Medina at this time, such that in reality he was only the religious leader of Medina, and his political influence would only become significant after the Battle of Badr in 624. Lewis opines that Muhammad's assumption of the role of statesman was a means through which the objectives of prophethood could be achieved. The constitution, although recently signed, was soon to be rendered obsolete due to the rapidly changing conditions in Medina, and with the exile of two of the Jewish tribes and the execution of the third after having been accused of breaching the terms of agreement.

The signing of the constitution could be seen as indicating the formation of a united community, in many ways, similar to a federation of nomadic clans and tribes, as the signatories were bound together by solemn agreement. The community, however, now also had a religious foundation. Extending this analogy, Watt argues that the functioning of the community resembled that of a tribe, such that it would not be incorrect to call the community a kind of "super-tribe". The signing of the constitution itself displayed a degree of diplomacy on part of Muhammad, as although he envisioned a society eventually based upon a religious outlook, practical consideration was needed to be inclusive instead of exclusive of the varying social elements.

==== Union of the Aws and Khazraj ====
Both the Aws and Khazraj had progressively converted to Islam, although the latter had been more enthusiastic than the former; at the second pledge of al-'Aqaba, 62 Khazrajis were present, in contrast to the three members of the Aws; and at the Battle of Badr, 175 members of the Khazraj were present, while the Aws numbered only 63. Subsequently, the hostility between the Aws and Khazraj gradually diminished and became unheard of after Muhammad's death. According to Muslim scholar al-Mubarakpuri, the 'spirit of brotherhood' as insisted by Muhammad amongst Muslims was the means through which a new society would be shaped.

The result was Muhammad's increasing influence in Medina, although he was most probably only considered a political force after the Battle of Badr, more so after the Battle of Uhud where he was clearly in political ascendency. To attain complete control over Medina, Muhammad would have to exercise considerable political and military skills, alongside religious skills over the coming years.

=== Treaty of Hudaybiyyah ===
==== Muhammad's attempt at performing the 'Umrah ====
In March 628, Muhammad saw himself in a dream performing the Umrah (lesser pilgrimage), and so prepared to travel with his followers to Mecca in the hopes of fulfilling this vision. He set out with a group of around 1,400 pilgrims (in the traditional ihram garb). On hearing of the Muslims travelling to Mecca for pilgrimage, the Quraysh sent out a force of 200 fighters in order to halt the approaching party. In no position to fight, Muhammad evaded the cavalry by taking a more difficult route through the hills north of Mecca, thereby reaching al-Hudaybiyya, just west of Mecca.

It was at Hudaybiyyah that a number of envoys went to and fro in order to negotiate with the Quraysh. During the negotiations, Uthman ibn Affan was chosen as an envoy to convene with the leaders in Mecca, on account of his high regard amongst the Quraysh. On his entry into Mecca, rumours ignited among the Muslims that 'Uthman had subsequently been murdered by the Quraysh. Muhammad responded by calling upon the pilgrims to make a pledge not to flee (or to stick with Muhammad, whatever decision he made) if the situation descended into war with Mecca. This pledge became known as the Pledge of Good Pleasure (Arabic: بيعة الرضوان, romanized: Bay'at ar-Ridhwān) or the Pledge Under The Tree.

The incident was mentioned in the Qur'an in Surah 48:

Allah's Good Pleasure was on the Believers when they swore Fealty to thee under the Tree: He knew what was in their hearts, and He sent down Tranquillity to them; and He rewarded them with a speedy Victory;

— Translated by Yusuf Ali, Sura 48 (Al-Fath), ayah 18

==== Signing of the Treaty ====
Soon afterwards, with the rumour of Uthman's slaying proven untrue, negotiations continued and a treaty was eventually signed between the Muslims and Quraysh. Conditions of the treaty included:

- the Muslims' postponement of the lesser pilgrimage until the following year
- a pact of mutual non-aggression between the parties
- a promise by Muhammad to return any member of Quraysh (presumably a minor or woman) fleeing from Mecca without the permission of their parent or guardian, even if they be Muslim.

Some of Muhammad's followers were upset by this agreement, as they had insisted that they should complete the pilgrimage they had set out for. Following the signing of the treaty, Muhammad and the pilgrims sacrificed the animals they had brought for it, and proceeded to return to Medina. It was only later that Muhammad's followers would realise the benefit behind this treaty. These benefits, according to Islamic historian Welch Buhl, included the inducing of the Meccans to recognise Muhammad as an equal; a cessation of military activity, boding well for the future; and gaining the admiration of Meccans who were impressed by the incorporation of the pilgrimage rituals.

==== Violation of the Treaty ====
The treaty was set to expire after 10 years, but was broken after only 10 months. According to the terms of the treaty of Hudaybiyyah, the Arab tribes were given the option to join either of the parties, the Muslims or Quraish. Should any of these tribes face aggression, the party to which it was allied would have the right to retaliate. As a consequence, Banu Bakr joined Quraish, and the Banu Khuza‘ah joined Muhammed. Banu Bakr attacked Banu Khuza'ah at al-Wateer in Sha'baan 8 AH and it was revealed that the Quraish helped Banu Bakr with men and arms taking advantage of the cover of the night. Pressed by their enemies, the tribesmen of Khuza‘ah sought the Holy Sanctuary, but here too, their lives were not spared, and Nawfal, the chief of Banu Bakr, chasing them in the sanctified area, massacred his adversaries.

== Correspondence with other leaders ==
There are instances according to Islamic tradition where Muhammad is thought to have sent letters to other heads of state during the Medinan phase of his life. Amongst others, these included the Negus of Axum, the Byzantine emperor Heraclius (r. 610–641), the Muqawqis of Egypt and the Sassanid emperor Khosrow II (r. 590–628). There has been controversy amongst academic scholars as to their authenticity. According to Martin Forward, academics have treated some reports with skepticism, although he argues that it is likely that Muhammad had assumed correspondence with leaders within the Arabian Peninsula. Robert Bertram Serjeant opines that the letters are forgeries and were designed to promote both the 'notion that Muhammad conceived of Islam as a universal religion and to strengthen the Islamic position against Christian polemic.' He further argues the unlikelihood of Muhammad sending such letters when he had not yet mastered Arabia. Irfan Shahid, professor of the Arabic language and Islamic literature at Georgetown University, contends that dismissing the letters sent by Muhammad as forgeries is "unjustified", pointing to recent research establishing the historicity of the letter to Heraclius as an example.

=== Letter to Heraclius of the Byzantine Empire ===
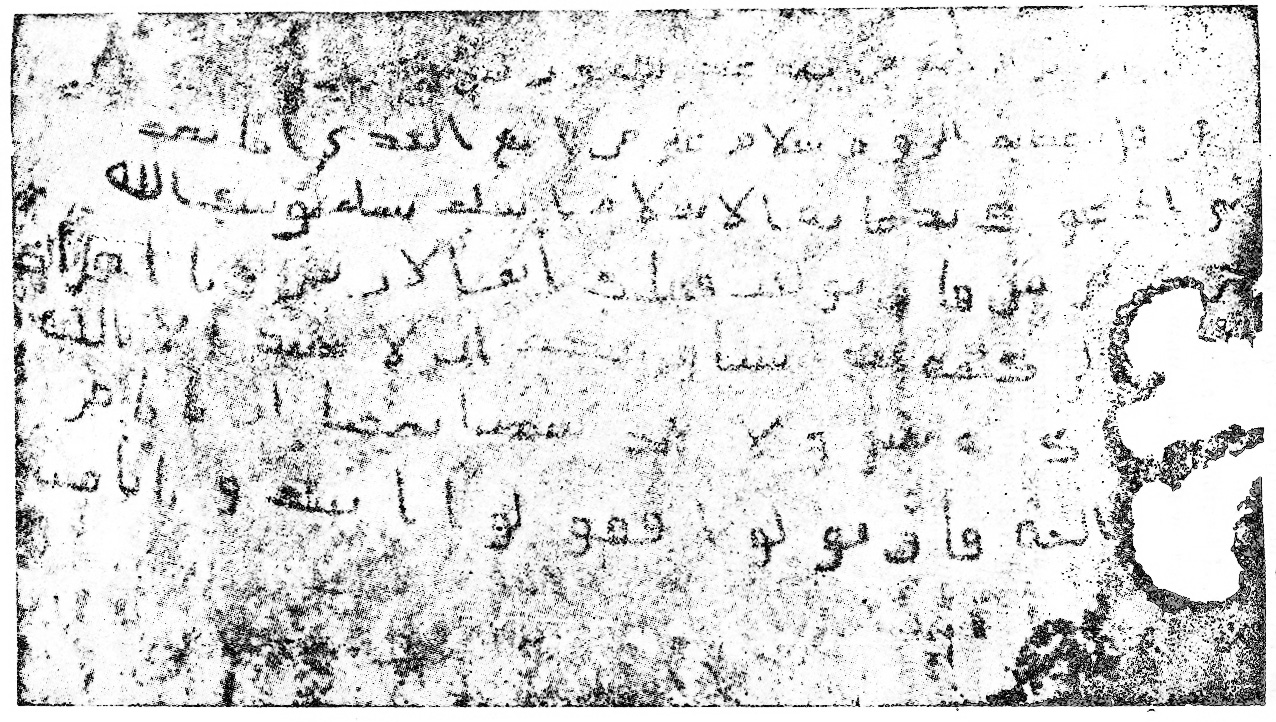
Purported letter sent by Muhammad to Emperor Heraclius; reproduction taken from Majid Ali Khan, Muhammad The Final Messenger Islamic Book Service, New Delhi (1998).

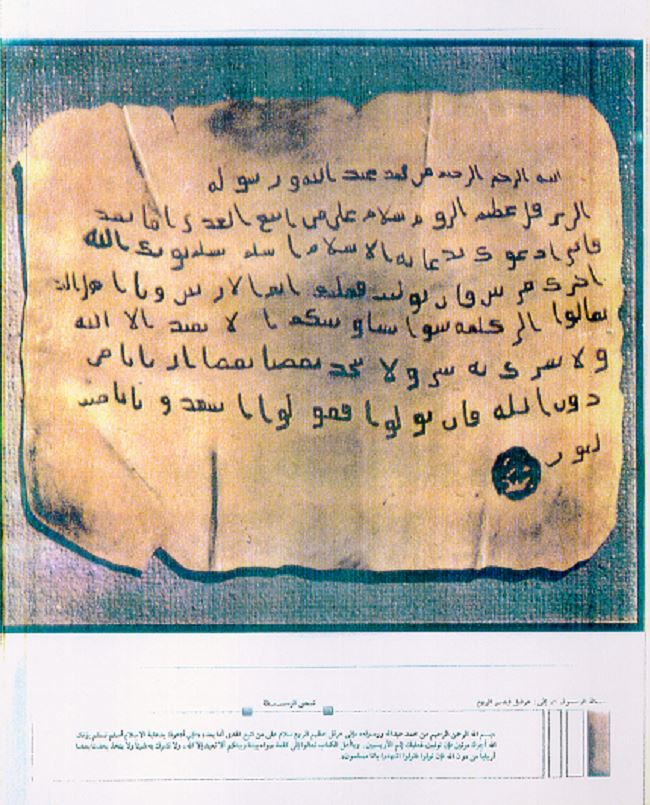
Purported letter sent by Muhammad to Heraclius, emperor of Byzantium; original version of the letter.

A letter was sent from Muhammad to the emperor of the Byzantine Empire, Heraclius, through the Muslim envoy Dihyah bin Khalifah al-Kalbi, although Shahid suggests that Heraclius may never have received it. He also advances that more positive sub-narratives surrounding the letter contain little credence. According to Nadia El Cheikh, Arab historians and chroniclers generally did not doubt the authenticity of Heraclius' letter due to the documentation of such letters in the majority of both early and later sources. Furthermore, she notes that the formulation and the wordings of different sources are very close and the differences are ones of detail: They concern the date on which the letter was sent and its exact phrasing. Muhammad Hamidullah, an Islamic research scholar, argues for the authenticity of the letter sent to Heraclius, and in a later work reproduces what is claimed to be the original letter.

The account as transmitted by Muslim historians is translated as follows:

In the name of God, the Gracious One, the Merciful
From Muhammad, servant of God and His apostle to Heraclius, premier of the Romans:
Peace unto whoever follows the guided path!
Thereafter, verily I call you to submit your will to God. Submit your will to God and you will be safe. God shall compensate your reward two-folds. But if you turn away, then upon you will be the sins of the peasants.
Then "O People of the Scripture, come to a term equitable between us and you that we worship none but God and associate with Him nothing, and we take not one another as Lords apart from God. But if they turn away, then say: Bear witness that we peace makers."^{[Quran 3:64]}
Seal: Muhammad, Apostle of God

According to Islamic reports, Muhammad dispatched Dihyah al-Kalbi to carry the epistle to "Caesar" through the government of Bosra after the Byzantine defeat of the Persians and reconquest of Jerusalem. Islamic sources say that after the letter was read to him, he was so impressed by it that he gifted the messenger of the epistle with robes and coinage. Alternatively, he also put it on his lap. He then summoned Abu Sufyan ibn Harb to his court, at the time an adversary to Muhammad but a signatory to the then-recent Treaty of al-Hudaybiya who was trading in the region of Syria at the time. Asked by Heraclius about the man claiming to be a prophet, Abu Sufyan responded, speaking favorably of Muhammad's character and lineage and outlining some directives of Islam. Heraclius was seemingly impressed by what he was told of Muhammad, and felt that Muhammad's claim to prophethood was valid. Later reportedly he wrote to a certain religious official in Rome to confirm if Muhammad's claim of prophethood was legitimate, only to receive a letter with a dismissive rejection from the council. Dissatisfied with the response, Heraclius then called upon the Roman assembly saying, "If you desire salvation and the orthodox way so that your empire remain firmly established, then follow this prophet". Heraclius eventually decided against conversion but the envoy was returned to Medina with the felicitations of the emperor. This letter is mentioned in Sahih Al Bukhari.

Scholarly historians disagree with this account, arguing that any such messengers would have received neither an imperial audience or recognition, and that there is no evidence outside of Islamic sources suggesting that Heraclius had any knowledge of Islam.

=== Letter to the Negus of Axum ===
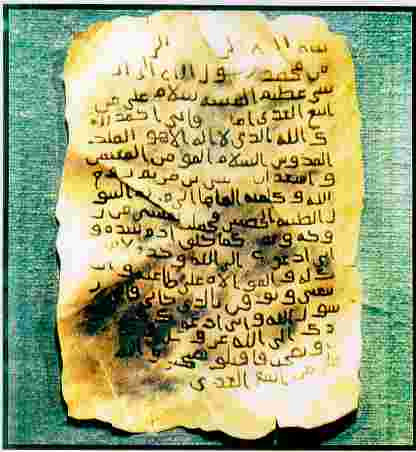
Muhammad's letter to Najashi.

The letter inviting Armah, the Axumite king of Ethiopia/Abyssinia, to Islam had been sent by Amr bin 'Umayyah ad-Damri, although it is not known if the letter had been sent with Ja'far on the migration to Abyssinia or at a later date following the Treaty of Hudaybiyyah. According to Hamidullah, the former may be more likely. The letter is translated as:

In the name of God, the Gracious One, the Merciful
From Muhammad, Apostle of God to the Negus, premier of the Abyssinians:
Peace unto whoever follows the guided path!
Thereafter, verily to you I make praise of God, but Whom there is no god, the King, the Holy One, the [Maker of] Peace, the Giver of Faith, the Giver of Security. And I bear witness that Jesus son of Mary is the Spirit of God and His Word that He cast into the Virgin Mary, the immaculate [and] the immune, and she was impregnated with Jesus by His Spirit and His blow like how He created Adam with His Hand. And I verily call you to the one God with no partner [associated in worship] to Him, and adherence upon His obedience, and that you follow me and believe in that which came to me, [for] I, in fact, am the Apostle of God and verily call you and your hosts toward God, [Possessor of] Might and Majesty.
And thus I have informed and sincerely admonished. So accept my sincere admonition. "And Peace unto whoever follows the guided path."^{[Quran 20:47]}
Seal: Muhammad, Apostle of God

Having received the letter, the Negus was purported by some Muslim sources to accept Islam in a reply he wrote to Muhammad. According to Islamic tradition, the Muslims in Medina prayed the funeral prayer in absentia for the Negus upon his death. However, there is no evidence for these claims with even some Muslim historians questioning them. It is possible that another letter was sent to the successor of the late Negus. This letter is mentioned in Sahih Muslim.

=== Letter to the Muqawqis of Egypt ===
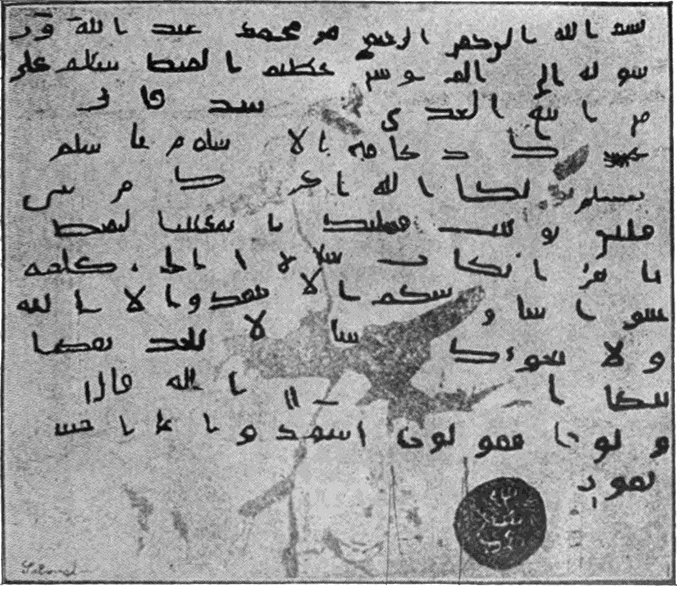
Drawing of Muhammad's letter to Muqauqis, which was discovered in Egypt in 1858

There has been conflict amongst scholars about the authenticity of aspects concerning the letter sent by Muhammad to Al-Muqawqis. Some scholars such as Nöldeke consider the currently preserved copy to be a forgery, and Öhrnberg considers the whole narrative concerning the Muqawqis to be "devoid of any historical value". Muslim historians, in contrast, generally affirm the historicity of the reports. The text of the letter (sent by Hatib bin Abu Balta'ah) according to Islamic tradition is translated as follows:

In the name of God, the Gracious One, the Merciful
From Muhammad, servant of God and His apostle to al-Muqawqis, premier of Egypt:
Peace unto whoever follows the guided path!
And thereafter, verily I call you to the call of Submission [to God] ("Islam"). Submit (i.e., embrace Islam) and be safe [from perdition, as] God shall compensate your reward two-folds. But if you turn away, then upon you will be the guilt [of delusion] of the Egyptians.
Then "O People of the Scripture, come to a term equitable between us and you that we worship none but God and associate [as partners in worship] with Him nothing, and we take not one another as Lords apart from God. [Then God says] But if they turn away, then say: Bear witness that we are Submitters [to God] ("Muslims")."^{[Quran 3:64]}
Seal: Muhammad, Apostle of God

Muqawqis responded by sending gifts to Muhammad, including two female slaves, Maria al-Qibtiyya and Sirin. Maria became the concubine of Muhammad, with some sources reporting that she was later freed and married. Muqawqis is reported in Islamic tradition as having preserved the contents of the parchment in an ivory casket, although he did not convert to Islam.

=== Letter to Khosrau II of the Sassanid Kingdom ===
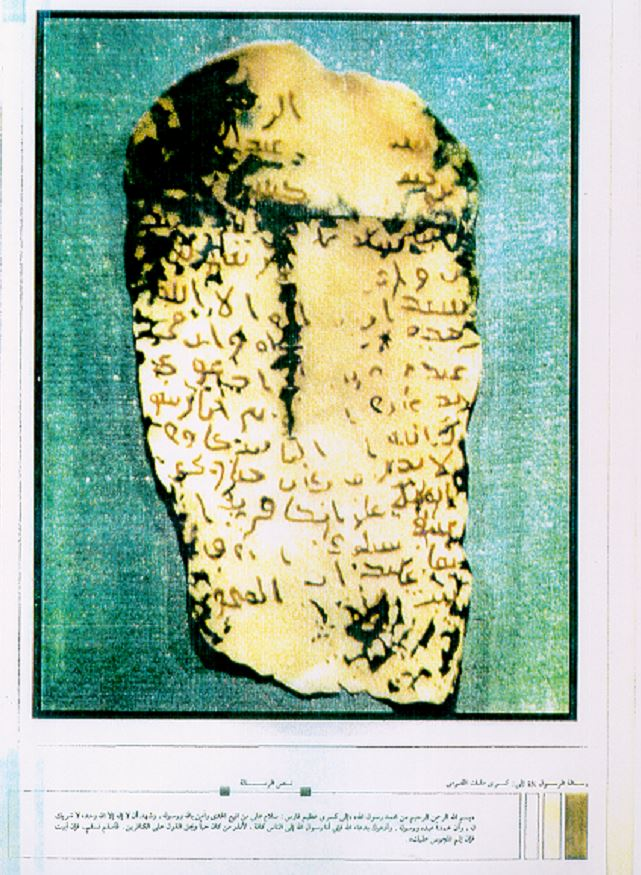
Muhammed's letter to Khosrau II (original copy)

The letter to Khosrow II (Arabic: كِسْرٰى, romanized: Kisrá) is translated by Muslim historians as:

In the name of God, the Gracious One, the Merciful
From Muhammad, Apostle of God to Khosrow, premier of Persia:
Peace unto whoever follows the guided path, and believes in God and His apostle, and bears witness that there is no god but the one God with no partner [associated in worship] to Him and that Muhammad is His servant and His apostle!
And [hence] I call you to the call of God, [for] in fact I am the apostle of God to mankind in its entirety, "To warn whoever is alive”.^{[Quran 36:70]}
So submit [to God] (i.e., embrace Islam) and be safe [from perdition]. But if you refuse, then verily will the guilt [of delusion] of the Zoroastrians ("Magians") be upon you.
Seal: Muhammad, Apostle of God

According to Muslim tradition, the letter was sent through Abdullah as-Sahmi (Note: "The apostle sent letters with his companions and sent them to the kings inviting them to Islam. He sent Diḥya b. Khalīfa al-Kalbī to Caesar, king of Rūm; ʿAbdullah b. Ḥudhāfa to Chosroes, king of Persia; ʿAmr b. Umayya al-Ḍamrī to the Negus, king of Abyssinia; Ḥāṭib b. Abū Baltaʾa to the Muqauqis, king of Alexandria;...al-ʿAlā' b. al-Ḥaḍramī to al-Mundhir b. Sāwā al-ʿAbdī, king of Baḥrayn; Shujāʿ b. Wahb al-Asdī to al-Ḥārith b. Abū Shimr al-Ghassānī, king of the Roman border." Guillaume, A. The Life of Muhammad. p. 789) who, through the governor of Bahrain, delivered it to the Khosrau. Upon reading it Khosrow II reportedly tore up the document, saying, "A pitiful slave among my subjects dares to write his name before mine" and commanded Badhan, his vassal ruler of Yemen, to dispatch two valiant men to identify, seize and bring this man from Hejaz (Muhammad) to him. When Abdullah ibn Hudhafah as-Sahmi told Muhammad how Khosrow had torn his letter to pieces, Muhammad is said to have stated, "May God [likewise] tear apart his kingdom," while reacting to the Caesar's behavior saying, "May God preserve his kingdom." This letter was mentioned in Sahih Muslim. In 628 CE the Sasanian civil war of 628–632 began which was followed by the Muslim conquest of Persia.

=== Other letters ===
==== The Sassanid governors of Bahrain and Yamamah ====
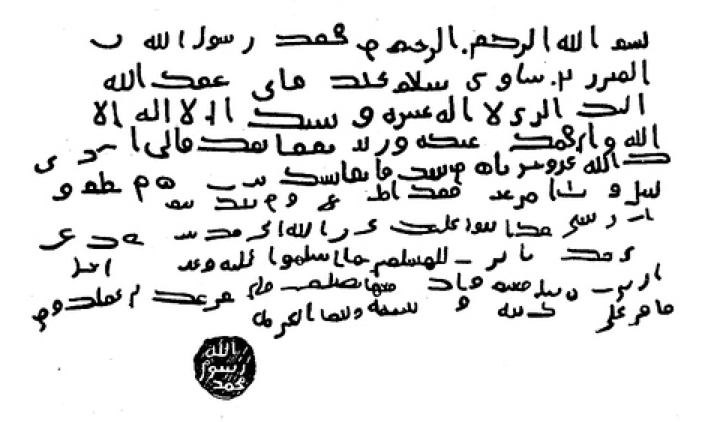
Muhammed's letter to Munzir b. Sawa (reproduction of a manuscript copy)

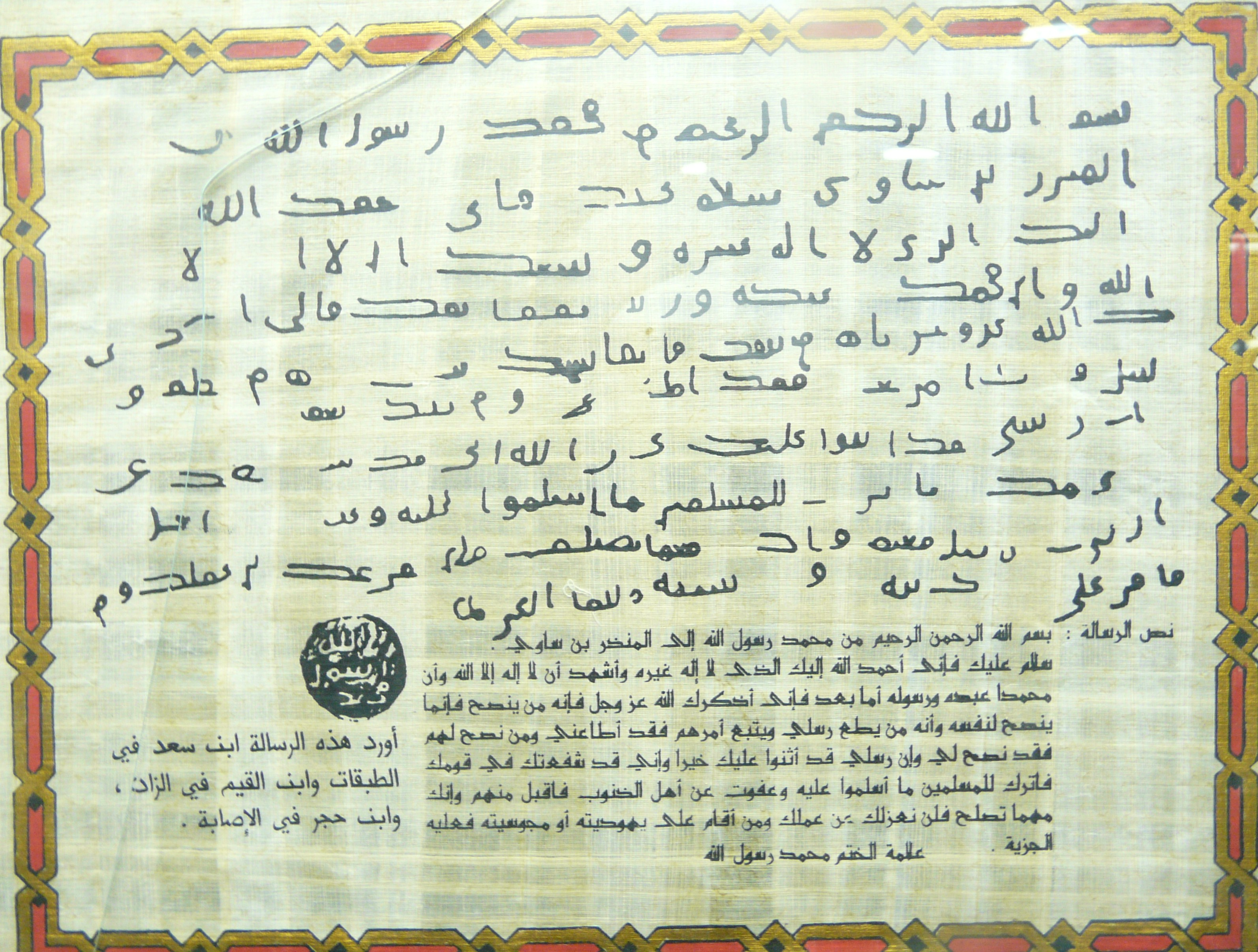
Message of Muhammad to Al-Mundhir bin Sawa reserved in Yemen Military Museum. Above is the original manuscript, below are modern printing characters for writing the same manuscript.

Apart from the aforementioned personalities, there are other reported instances of correspondence. Munzir ibn Sawa al-Tamimi, the governor of Bahrain, was apparently an addressee, with a letter having been delivered to him through al-'Alaa ibn al-Hadrami. He reportedly accepted Islam along with some of his subjects, but some of them did not. A similar letter was sent to Haudha ibn Ali, the governor of Yamamah, who replied that he would only convert if he were given a position of authority within Muhammad's government, a proposition which Muhammad was unwilling to accept.

==== The Ghassanids ====
Muhammad sent a letter to al-Ḥārith bin ʾAbī Shamir al-Ghassānī, who ruled Byzantine Syria, based in Bosra, (Note: He is referred to as عَظِيمِ بُصْرَى "premier of Bosra") or alternatively in Damascus. He hailed from the Ghassanid dynasty of Hellenized Arabs (comparable though superior in status to the Herodian dynasty of Roman Palestine). The letter reads as follows:

In the name of God, the Gracious One, the Merciful
From Muhammad, Apostle of God to al-Ḥāriṯ the son of ʾAbū Šamir:
Peace unto whoever follows the guided path and believe in God and is sincere [about it]!
Thereby I call you to [this] that you believe in the one God with no partner [associated in worship] to Him [and] your kingship remains yours.
Seal: Muhammad, Apostle of God

Al-Ghassani reportedly reacted unfavourably, viewing Muhammad's correspondence as an insult.

==== The 'Azd ====
Jayfar and 'Abd, princes of the powerful ruling 'Azd tribe which ruled Oman in collaboration with the Persian governors, were sons of the client king Juland (frequently spelt Al-Julandā based on the Perso-Arabic pronunciation). They embraced Islam peacefully on 628 AD upon receiving the letter sent from Muhammad through 'Amr ibn al-'As. The 'Azd subsequently played a major role in the ensuant Islamic conquests. They were one of the five tribal contingents that settled in the newly founded garrison city of Basra at the head of the Persian Gulf; under their general Al-Muhallab ibn Abi Sufra; they also took part in the conquest of Khurasan and Transoxania.

The letter reads as follows:

In the name of God, the Gracious One, the Merciful
From Muhammad, Apostle of God to Jayfar and ʿAbd [sic], the sons of al-Julandī:
Then peace unto whoever follows the guided path!
Thereafter, verily I call you two to the call of Submission [to God] ("Islam"). Submit (i.e., embrace Islam) and be safe I, in fact, am the apostle of God to mankind in its entirety, "that he may warn whoever is alive Then indeed you two: if you consent unto Submission to Allah, I shall patronize you. But if you refuse, then [know that] indeed your reign is fleeting, and my horsemen shall invade into your courtyard, and my prophethood shall become dominate your kingdom.
Seal: Muhammad, Apostle of God

== See also ==
- Muslim history
- Itmam al-hujjah
- Sharia
- Types of Islamic Jihad
- Islam and war
- Military career of Muhammad
- List of expeditions of Muhammad
