= Sulayt ibn Amr =

7th-century Muslim emissary to Bahrain

Sulayt ibn Amr (Arabic: سليط بن عمرو) was a 7th-century Muslim emissary to Bahrain.

He was among the 83 Makkans Muslims who migrated to Ethiopia from Mecca after undergoing harrowing feats of persecution by the Quraishi idolators. Their contingent was headed by Muhammad's cousin Ja`far bin Abī Tālib, Uthman, Ruqayya (the daughter of Muhammad and Khadija).

He was Muhammad's messenger for Haudha ibn Ali, ruler of Al-Yamama.
