= Athar an Nabi =

Town near Cairo, Egypt

Coordinates: 29°59′25″N 31°13′59″E

Athar an Nabi ( أثر النبي ) is a town in Egypt, about 4 miles (7 km) south of Cairo. Its name is Arabic for "Effect (or Footprints) of the Prophet", but is an altered form of Coptic ϩⲁⲑⲱⲣⲛⲟⲩⲃ (Hathornub), meaning "Golden Hathor", perhaps referring to an Ancient Egyptian cult centre formerly present there.

== See also ==
- List of Coptic place names
