= Seal of Muhammad =

Sacred Islamic relic

The alleged seal of Prophet Muhammad, muqwaki (circular) design

The Seal of Prophet Muhammad (Turkish: Muhammed'in mührü, Arabic: ختم الرسول, romanized: KḪatm ar-Rasūl) (Note: to be distinguished: ختم الرسول or خاتم الرسول: "seal of the messenger", the term for Muhammad's signet ring (also خاتم محمد "seal of Muhammad"); خاتم النبيين: "seal of the prophets", the title given to Muhammad; خاتم النبوة: "seal of prophethood", the name of the egg-shaped protrusion on Muhammad's shoulder-blade; also, محمد خاتمی by coincidential near-homography, the name of Mohammad Amir Khatam.) is one of the alleged relics of Muhammad kept in the Topkapı Palace by the Ottoman Sultans as part of the Sacred Relics collection. This seal is referred to as the Topkapı seal.

A second seal, of a different design, is the Muqwaki seal. It is the most popular design, used on several Jihadist flags such as the ISIS flag. It is the replica of a seal purportedly used by Muhammad on a letter addressed to al-Muqawqis. Scholars have determined the letter to be a literary forgery on palaeographic grounds.

== Topkapı seal ==
Jean-Baptiste Tavernier in 1675 reported that the seal was kept in a small ebony box in a niche cut in the wall by the foot of a divan in the relic room at Topkapı. The seal itself is encased in crystal, approximately 3" × 4", with a border of ivory. It has been used as recently as the 17th century to stamp documents.

The seal is a rectangular piece of red agate, about 1 cm (1/2 in) in length, inscribed with محمد رسول الله (i.e., Allāh "God" in the first line, rasūl "messenger" in the second line and Muḥammad at the bottom similarly as shown in the above image). According to Muslim historiographical tradition, Muhammad's original seal was inherited by Abu Bakr, Umar, and Uthman, but lost by Uthman in a well in Medina. Uthman is said to have made a replica of the seal, and this seal was supposedly found in the capture of Baghdad (1534) and brought to Istanbul.

According to George Frederick Kunz, when Muhammad was about to send a letter to the Emperor Heraclius, he was told he needed a seal to be recognized as coming from him. Muhammad had a seal made of silver, with the words Muḥammad rasūl Allāh or "Muhammad the Apostle of God." The three words, on three lines, were on the ring, and Muhammad ordered that no duplicate was to be made. After his death, the ring came down to Uthman, who accidentally dropped the ring into the well of Aris. The well was so deep the bottom has never been found, and the ring remained lost. At that time a copy was made, but the loss of the original ring was assumed to be an indication of ill-fortune to come.

Sir Richard Francis Burton writes that it is a "Tradition of the Prophet" that carnelian is the best stone for a signet ring, and that tradition was still in use in 1868. The carnelian stone is also "a guard against poverty".

== Muqwaki seal ==
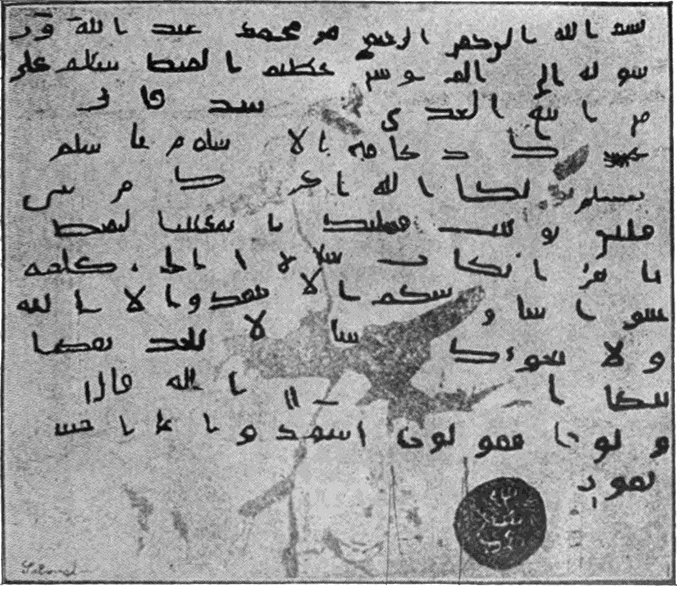
Circular seal impression in Muhammad's letter to the Muqawqis of Egypt (1904 drawing)

A different design of the seal is circular, based on an Ottoman-era manuscript copy of a letter purportedly sent by Muhammad to al-Muqawqis. This is the variant that has become familiar as the "seal of Muhammad."

This version of the seal is inscribed as thus, to be read from the bottom to the top:

- الله (Allāh, "God")
- رسول (rasūl, "is the messenger of")
- محمد (Muḥammad)

=== Historicity ===
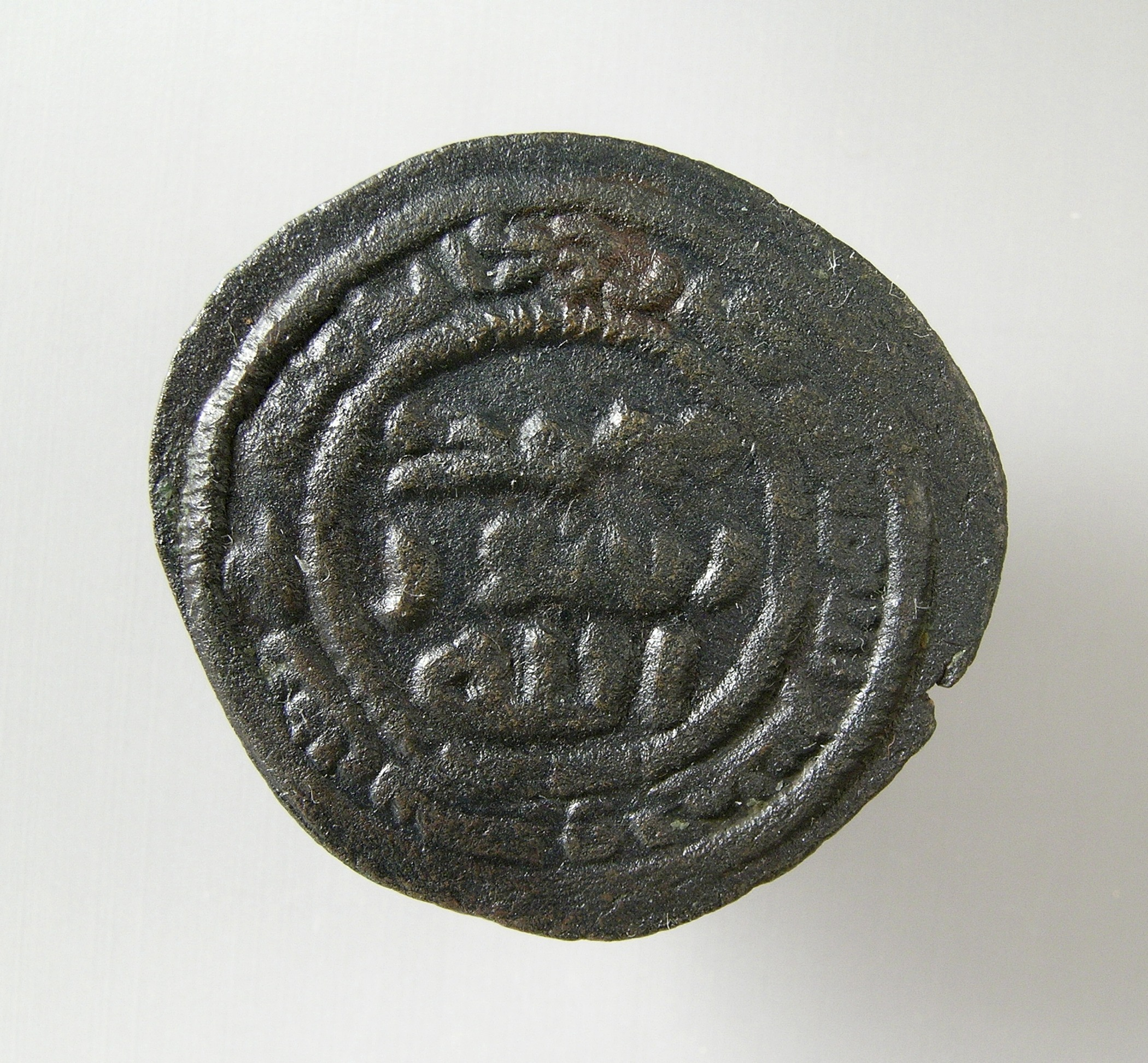
An 8th-century Umayyad coin with "Muhammad" on the top line instead of "God"

The letter is considered a literary forgery by scholars. Based on comparative palaeographic analysis with early Arabic papyri, Austrian orientalist Joseph Karabacek assessed the letter to be a forgery. Nöldeke (1909) agreed with his conclusions, and Öhrnberg (2007) considers the narrative about a letter being sent to al-Muqawqis to be "devoid of any historical value", and the seal to be fake on paleographic grounds – its writing style being anachronistic and hinting at an Ottoman Turkish origin.

Early Muslim accounts describe Muhammad's personal seal as bearing the inscription "Muhammad, messenger [of] God," arranged with each word on a separate line, beginning with "Muhammad" at the top rather than "God". Early Islamic coins feature the phrase in this format. Beginning in the 14th century, some Islamic scholars suggested that the word order was the opposite, starting with "God" rather than "Muhammad", on the grounds that it would have been more appropriate to place "God" above "Muhammad". Ibn Hajar al-Asqalani rejected this notion, citing an absence of historical evidence. Based on this, Ahmed El Shamsy concludes that the order of the words used in the Muqwaki seal is a medieval invention.

== Other signatures ==
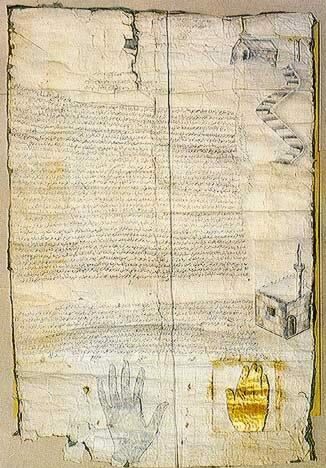
The hand seal of Muhammad on the Ashtiname of Muhammad, a grant of protection to the Holy Monastery of Sinai.

In addition to using a signet ring to seal documents, Muhammad may have also used other techniques to show the provenance of his correspondence. In an alleged letter to the Saint Catherine's Monastery in Egypt, he signed the letter, also called the Ashtiname of Muhammad, by inking his hand and pressing the impression on the paper. The letter granted protection and privileges to the monastery. In part it says: "I shall exempt them from that which may disturb them; of the burdens which are paid by others as an oath of allegiance. They must not give anything of their income but that which pleases them—they must not be offended, or disturbed, or coerced or compelled. Their judges should not be changed or prevented from accomplishing their offices, nor the monks disturbed in exercising their religious order, or the people of seclusion be stopped from dwelling in their cells. No one is allowed to plunder these Christians, or destroy or spoil any of their churches, or houses of worship, or take any of the things contained within these houses and bring it to the houses of Islam. And he who takes away anything therefrom, will be one who has corrupted the oath of God, and, in truth, disobeyed His Messenger." It is sealed with an imprint representing Muhammad's hand.
