= Transhumance =

Type of pastoralism

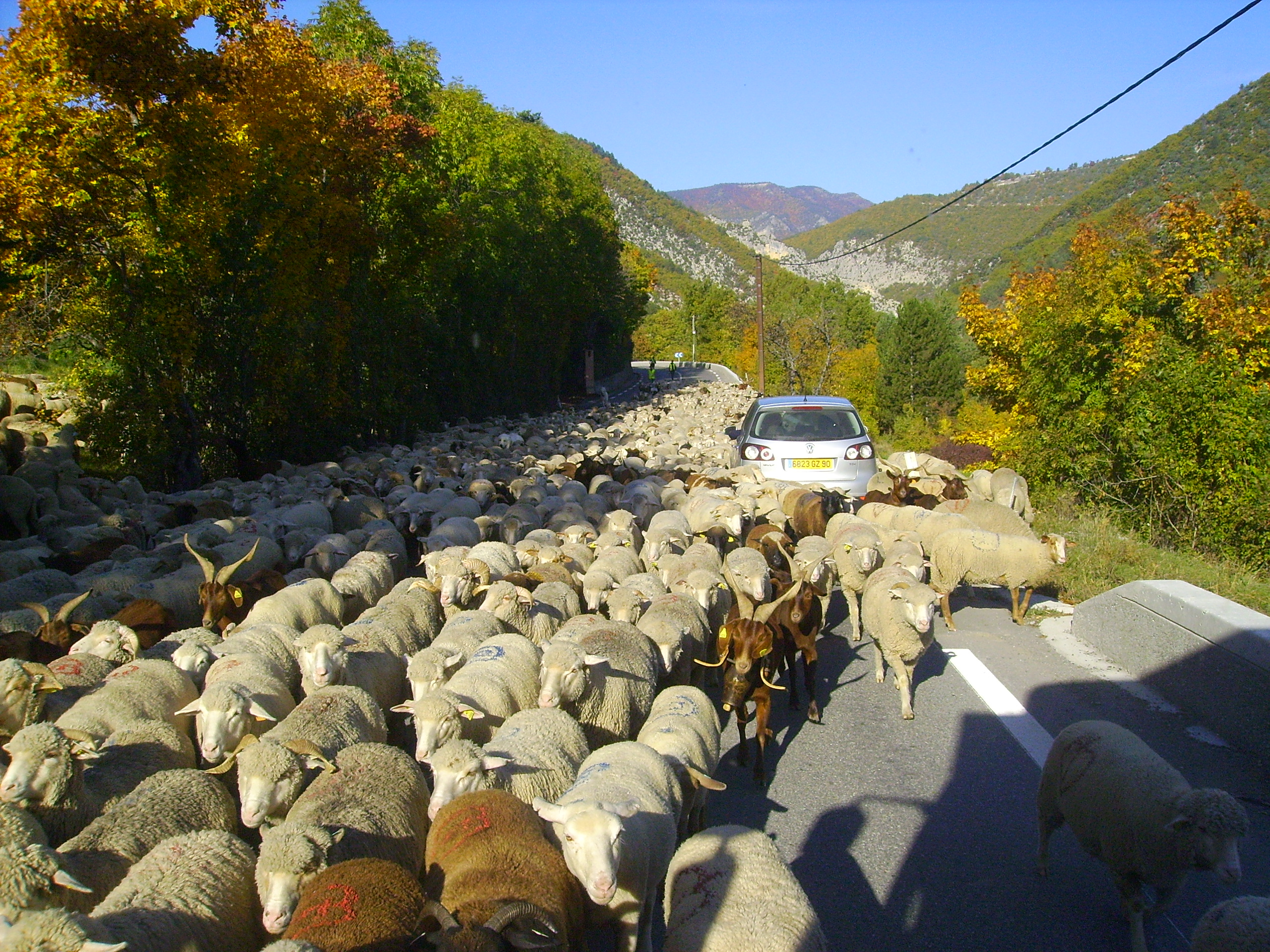
Transhumance in Alpes-de-Haute-Provence, France

Transhumance is a type of mobile pastoralism in which grazing livestock are moved (droved) in herds seasonally between several fixed pastures, in contrast to sedentary pastoralism, where the livestock remain all year round on the same (typically a fenced) area of land, known as a ranch; and nomadic pastoralism, where the livestock are moved irregularly or randomly among different regions in search of any usable pastures. In montane regions, it implies livestock movement between the higher-altitude alpine steppes in summer and the alluvial grasslands in the lowland valleys in winter (i.e. vertical transhumance or alpine transhumance). In contrast, seasonal movement across the same plains or plateaus (i.e. horizontal transhumance) is typically done due to limited forage yield from a single patch of pasture and/or to avoid overgrazing, and is more susceptible to disruption by climatic, economic or political change as with any cross-region livelihoods.

In transhumance, generally only the livestock participate in mass travel, while only a small number of human professionals who directly manage the herds (i.e. the herders) will accompany the livestock's movement and dwell in camps or seasonally used huts/lodges at the grazing sites. This is in contrast to nomadic pastoralists, whose entire pastoral community tend to migrate with their herds in portable shelters such as tents and yurt. Most of the human population involved with the transhumance economy will live in sedentary homes, typically in permanent settlements, and they only come out to visit the herds and help the herders when needs arise. With the rise of modern precision livestock farming technologies, even some herders can work from home using GPS tracking, virtual fencing and agricultural drones, and only need to perform routine (typically daily) or emergency field visits via motor vehicles to personally tend the herds and then return home after the work is done.

Traditional or fixed transhumance has occurred throughout the inhabited world, particularly Europe and western Asia. It is often important to pastoralist societies, as the dairy products of transhumance flocks and herds (milk, butter, yogurt and cheese) may form much of the diet of such populations. In many languages there are words for the higher summer pastures, and frequently these words have been used as place names: e.g. hafod in Wales, shieling in Scotland, or Alm or Alp in Germany, Austria and German-speaking regions of Switzerland and Italy.

== Etymology and definition ==
The word transhumance comes from French and derives from the Latin words trans "across" and humus "ground". Literally, it means crossing the land. Transhumance developed on every inhabited continent. Although there are substantial cultural and technological variations, the underlying practices for taking advantage of remote seasonal pastures are similar linguistically.

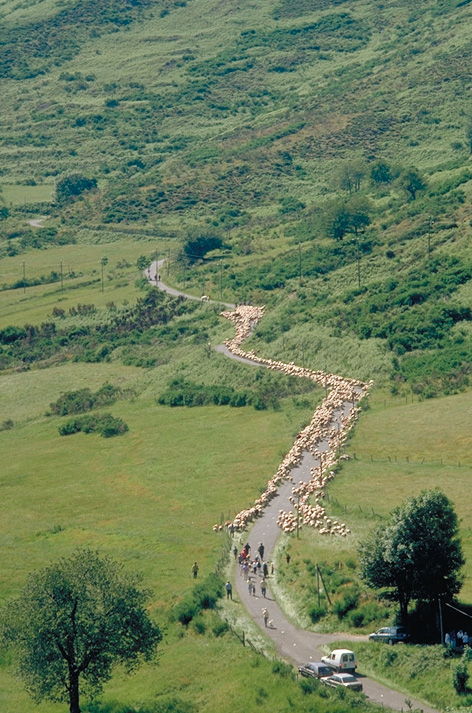
Moving sheep up along a drovers' road in the Massif Central, France

Khazanov categorizes nomadic forms of pastoralism into five groups as follows: "pure pastoral nomadism", "semi-nomadic pastoralism", "semi-sedentary pastoralism", "distant-pastures husbandry" and "seasonal transhumance". Eickelman does not make a distinction between transhumant pastoralism and seminomadism, but he clearly distinguishes between nomadic pastoralism and seminomadism.

== In prehistory ==
There is evidence that transhumance was practised world-wide prior to recorded history: in Europe, isotope studies of livestock bones suggest that certain animals were moved seasonally.

The prevalence of various groups of Hill people around the world suggests that indigenous knowledge regarding transhumance must have developed and survived over generations to allow for the acquisition of sufficient skills to thrive in mountainous regions. Most drovers are conversant with subsistence agriculture, pastoralism as well as forestry and frozen water and fast stream management.

== Europe ==
=== Balkans ===
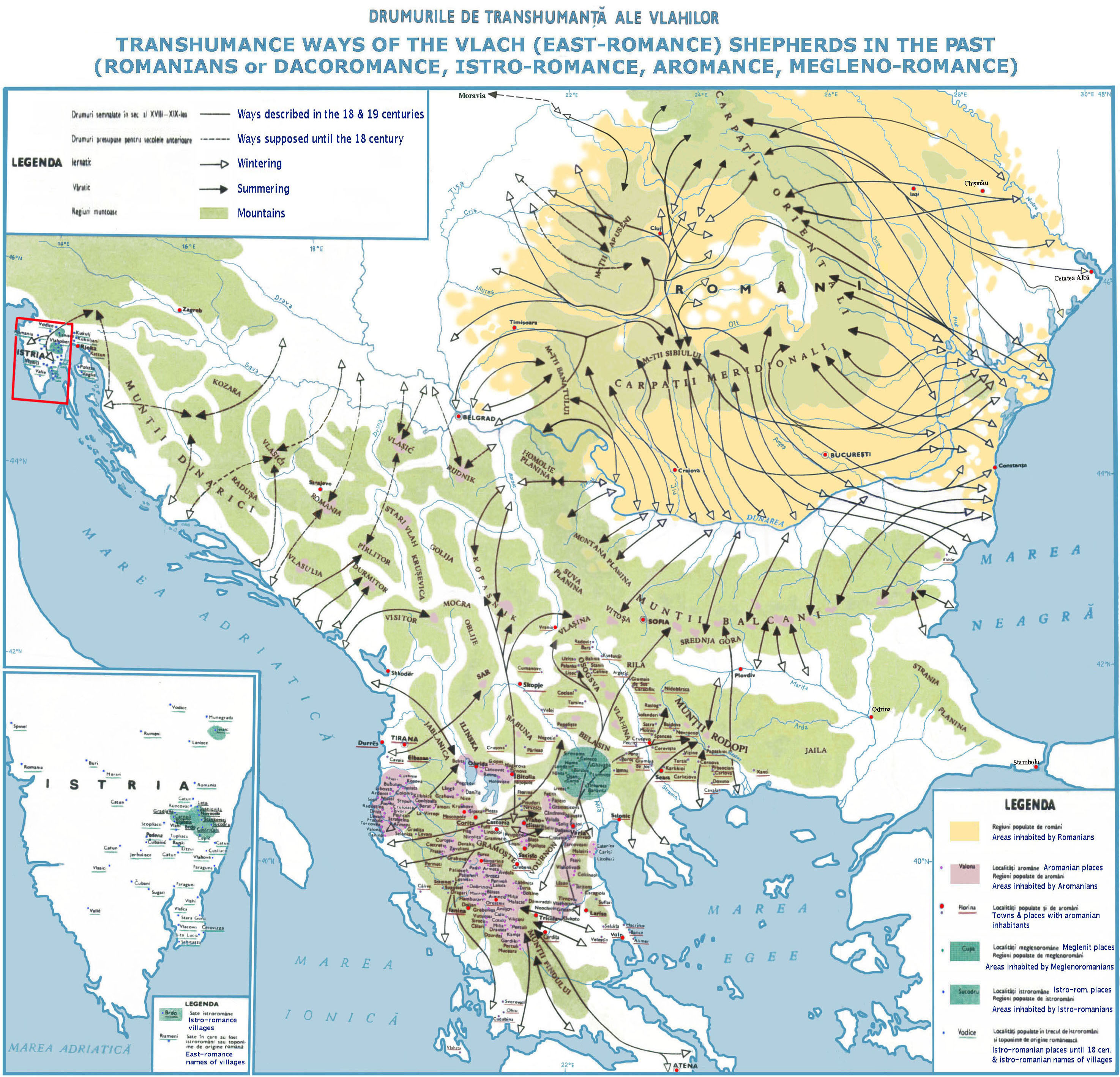
Romanian and Vlach transhumance in Balkans

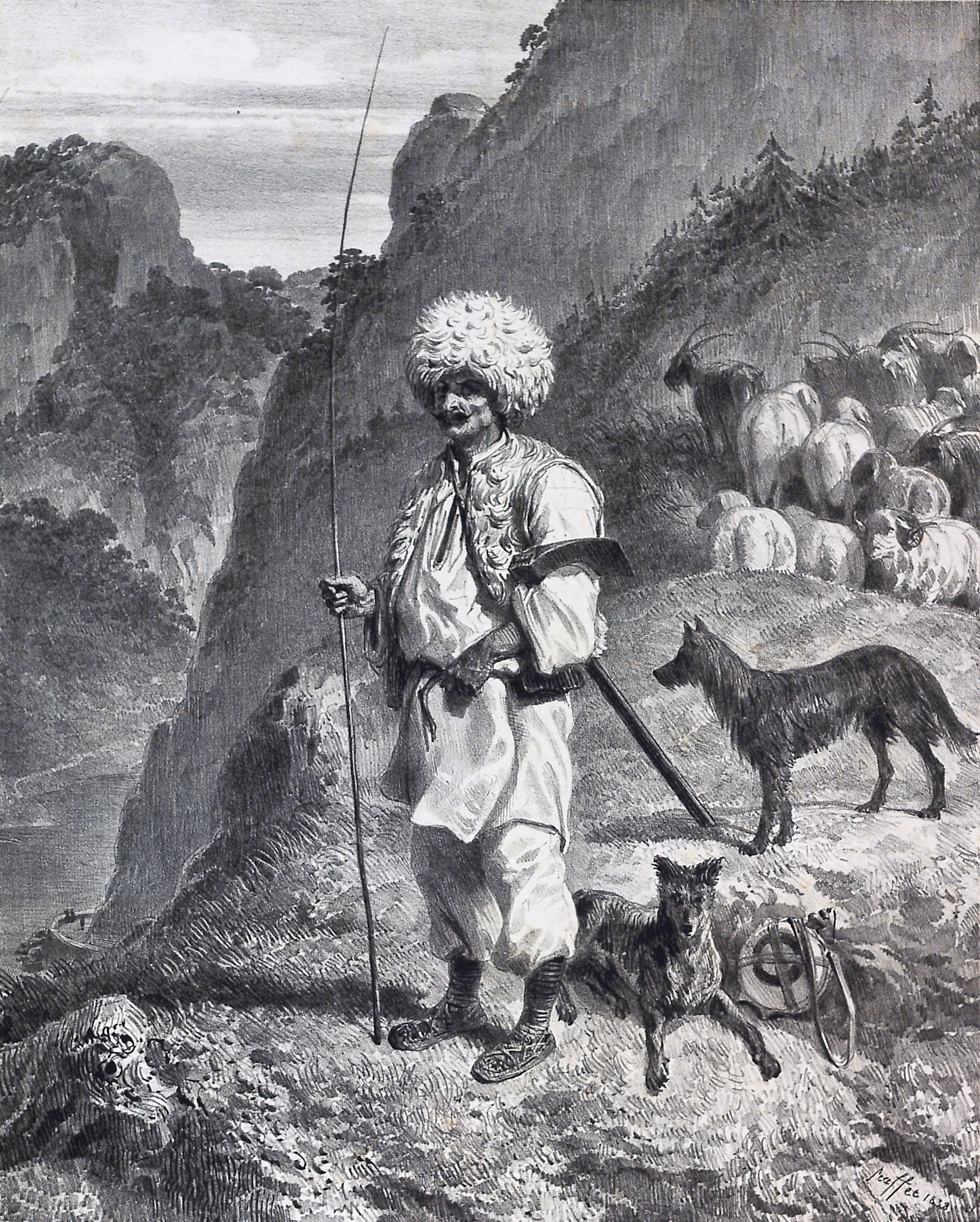
Vlach shepherd in Banat

In the Balkans, Albanians, Greek Sarakatsani, Eastern Romance (Romanians, Aromanians, Megleno-Romanians and Istro-Romanians) and Turkish Yörük peoples traditionally spent summer months in the mountains and returned to lower plains in the winter. When the area was part of the Austro-Hungary and Ottoman Empires, borders between Greece, Albania, Bulgaria and the former Yugoslavia were relatively unobstructed. In summer, some groups went as far north as the Balkan Mountains, and they would spend the winter on warmer plains in the vicinity of the Aegean Sea.

The Morlach or Karavlachs were a population of Eastern Romance shepherds ("ancestors" of the Istro-Romanians) who lived in the Dinaric Alps (western Balkans in modern use), constantly migrating in search of better pastures for their sheep flocks. But as national states appeared in the area of the former Ottoman Empire, new state borders were developed that divided the summer and winter habitats of many of the pastoral groups. These prevented easy movement across borders, particularly at times of war, which have been frequent.

=== Poland ===
In Poland transhumance is known as redyk, and is the ceremonial departure of shepherds with their flocks of sheep and shepherd dogs to graze in the mountain pastures (spring redyk), as well as their return from grazing (autumn redyk). In the local mountain dialect, autumn redyk is called uosod, which comes from the Polish word uosiadć (ôsawiedź), meaning “to return sheep to individual farms”. There is also a theory that it comes from the word uozchod (ôzchod), which means “the separation of sheep from individual gazdōwek (farms)”. In this word, there may have been a complete loss of the pronunciation of ch, which in the Podhale dialect (Poland) in this type of positions is pronounced as a barely audible h (so-called sonorous h), similarly to the word schować, which in the highlander language is pronounced as sowa. In the Memoir of the Tatra Society from 1876, the way in which this is done is described: "[...] they herd sheep from the entire village to one agreed place, give them to the shepherds and shepherds one by one, then mix them together and count the number of the whole herd (flock). This is what they call "the reading". The reading is done in such a way that one juhas, holding the chaplet in his hand, puts one bead for each ten sheep counted. The second one takes one sheep from the flock and, as he lets it out of the fenced barracks, counts: one, two, three, etc. up to ten, and after each ten he calls out: "desat"

The leading of the sheep was preceded by magical procedures that were supposed to protect them from bad fate and from being enchanted. For this purpose, bonfires were lit and sheep were led through the fire. It began with the resurrection of the "holy fire" in the kolyba (shepherd's hut). Custom dictated that from that day on, it was to be kept burning continuously by the main shepherd – the shepherd. Next, the sheep were led around a small chevron or spruce tree stuck in the ground – the so-called mojka (which was supposed to symbolize the health and strength of everyone present in the hall) and they were fumigated with burning herbs and a połazzka brought to the sałasz. This was intended to cleanse them of diseases and prevent misfortune. Then the flock was herded around it three times, which was intended to concentrate the sheep into one group and prevent individual animals from escaping. Baca's task was to pull the sheep behind him, helping himself with salt which he sprinkled on the flock. With the help of dogs and whistles, the Juhasi encouraged the herd and made sure that the sheep followed the shepherd. Sheep that fell outside the circle boded ill. It was believed that the number of sheep that fell outside the circle would die in the coming season.

The stay in the pasture (hala) begins on St. Wojciech's Day (23 April), and ends on Michaelmas Day (29 September).

This method of sheep grazing is a relic of transhumant agriculture, which was once very common in the Carpathians. (Carpathian transhumance agriculture).

In the pastoral culture in Poland, Redyk was perceived as the greatest village festival. Farmers who gave their sheep to a shepherd for the entire season, before grazing in the pastures, listed them (most often by marking them with notches on the shepherd's stick, stick or beam), marked them and placed them in a basket made of tynin. In the Memoir of the Tatra Society from 1876, the way in which this is done is described: "[...] they herd sheep from the entire village to one agreed place, give them to the shepherds and shepherds one by one, then mix them together and count the number of the whole herd (flock).

The sheep of all the shepherds were gathered in one place at the foot of the mountains, and then one large herd was driven to the shepherds hut. The entrance to the hala was also particularly emphasized: there was shooting, honking and shouting all the way. This was intended to drive away evil spirits from their animals and to keep the entire herd together.

At the end of the ceremony, there was music and dancing together. The musicians played traditional instruments: gajdas and violins. To the accompaniment of music, the Sałashniks performed the oldest individual dance – the owiedziok, the owczarza, the kolomajka, the swinszczok, the masztołka.

Redyk included many local practices, rituals and celebrations. In modern time it is mainly a part of local traditional entertainment. The modern spring and autumn Redyk (sheep drive) has the character of a folkloric spectacle addressed to locals and tourists, but also to the highlanders themselves, who to identify with their traditions. Sometimes common redyk was organised also in Czechia, Slovakia and Romania. In Poland, the organisers was the Transhumant Pastoral Foundation.

=== Britain ===
==== Wales ====
In most parts of Wales, farm workers and sometimes the farmer would spend the summer months at a hillside summer house, or hafod (pronounced [ˈhavɔd]), where the livestock would graze. During the late autumn the farm family and workers would drive the flocks down to the valleys and stay at the main house or hendref ([ˈhɛndrɛv]).

This system of transhumance has generally not been practised for almost a century; it continued in Snowdonia after it ceased elsewhere in Wales, and remnants of the practice can still be found in rural farming communities in the region to this day. Both "Hafod" and "Hendref" survive in Wales as place names and house names and in one case as the name of a raw milk cow cheese (Hafod). Today, cattle and sheep that summer on many hill farms are still transported to lowland winter pastures, but by truck rather than being driven overland.

==== Scotland ====
In many hilly and mountainous areas of Scotland, agricultural workers spent summer months in bothies or shielings (àirigh or ruighe in Scottish Gaelic). Major drovers' roads in the eastern part of Scotland include the Cairnamounth, Elsick Mounth and Causey Mounth. This practice has largely stopped but was practised within living memory in the Hebrides and in the Scottish Highlands. Today much transhumance is carried out by truck, with upland flocks being transported under agistment to lower-lying pasture during winter.

==== England ====
Evidence exists of transhumance being practised in England since at least medieval times, from Cornwall in the south-west, through to the north of England. In the Lake District, hill sheep breeds, such as the Herdwick and Swaledale are moved between moor and valley in summer and winter. This led to a trait and system known as "hefting", whereby sheep and flock remain in the farmer's allotted area (heaf) of the commons, which is still practised.

=== Ireland ===
In Ireland, transhumance is known as "booleying". Transhumance pastures were known as buaile, variously anglicised as booley, boley, bouley or boola. These names survive in many place names such as Buaile h'Anraoi in Kilcommon parish, Erris, North Mayo, where the landscape still clearly shows the layout of the rundale system of agriculture. The livestock, usually cattle, was moved from a permanent lowland village to summer pastures in the mountains. The appearance of "Summerhill" (Irish: Cnoc an tSamhraidh) in many place names also bears witness to the practice. This transfer alleviated pressure on the growing crops and provided fresh pasture for the livestock. Mentioned in the Brehon Laws, booleying dates back to the Early Medieval period or even earlier. The practice was widespread in the west of Ireland up until the time of the Second World War. Seasonal migration of workers to Scotland and England for the winter months superseded this ancient system, together with more permanent emigration to the United States.

=== Italy ===
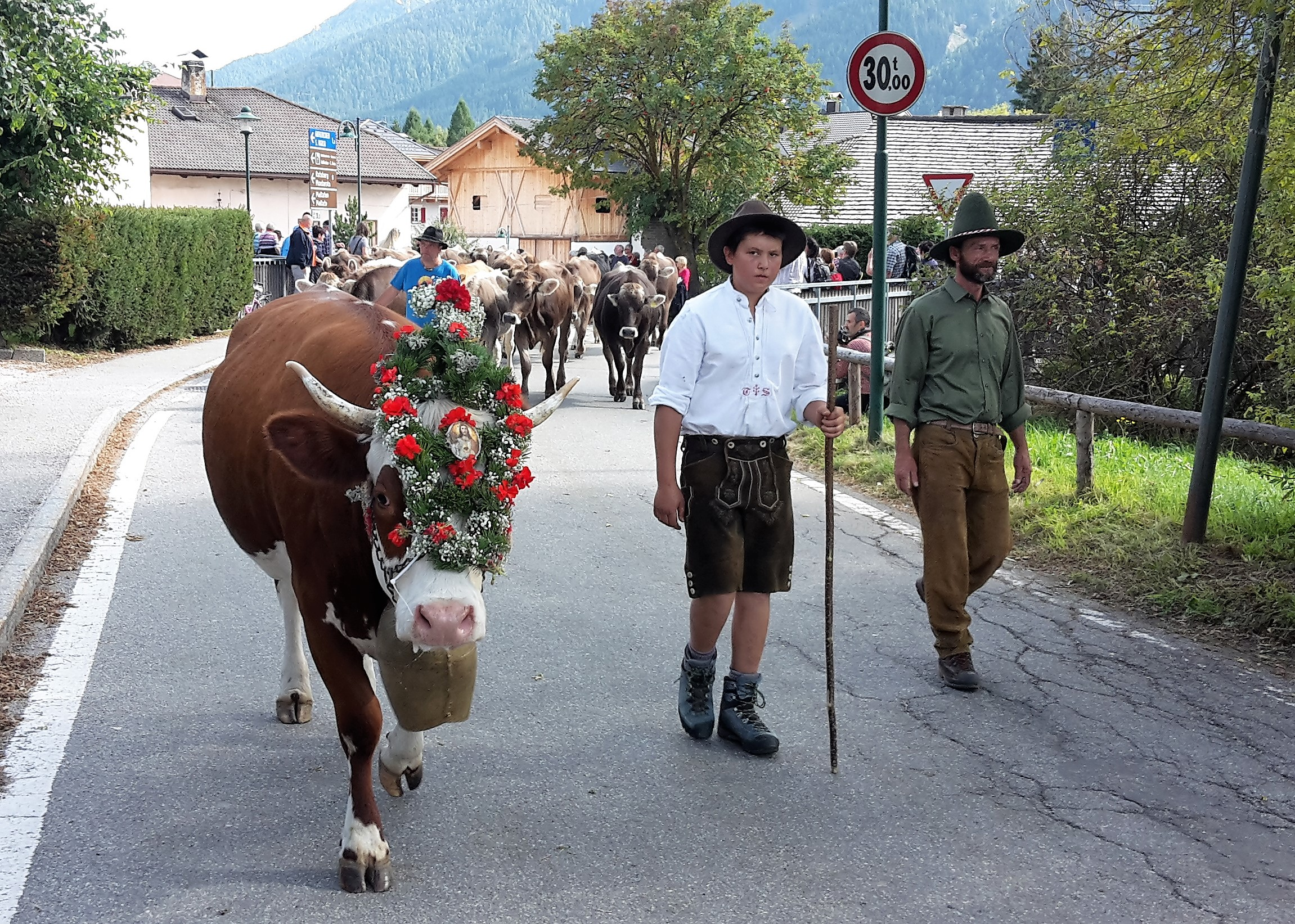
Transhumance in Toblach, South Tyrol

In Southern Italy, the practice of driving herds to hilly pasture in summer was also known in some parts of the regions l and has had a long-documented history until the 1950s and 1960s with the advent of alternative road transport. Drovers' roads, or tratturi, up to 100 metres (328 ft) wide and more than 100 kilometres (62 mi) long, permitted the passage and grazing of herds, principally sheep, and attracted regulation by law and the establishment of a mounted police force as far back as the 17th century. The tratturi remain public property and subject to conservation by the law protecting cultural heritage. The Molise region candidates the tratturi to the UNESCO as a world heritage.

=== Spain ===
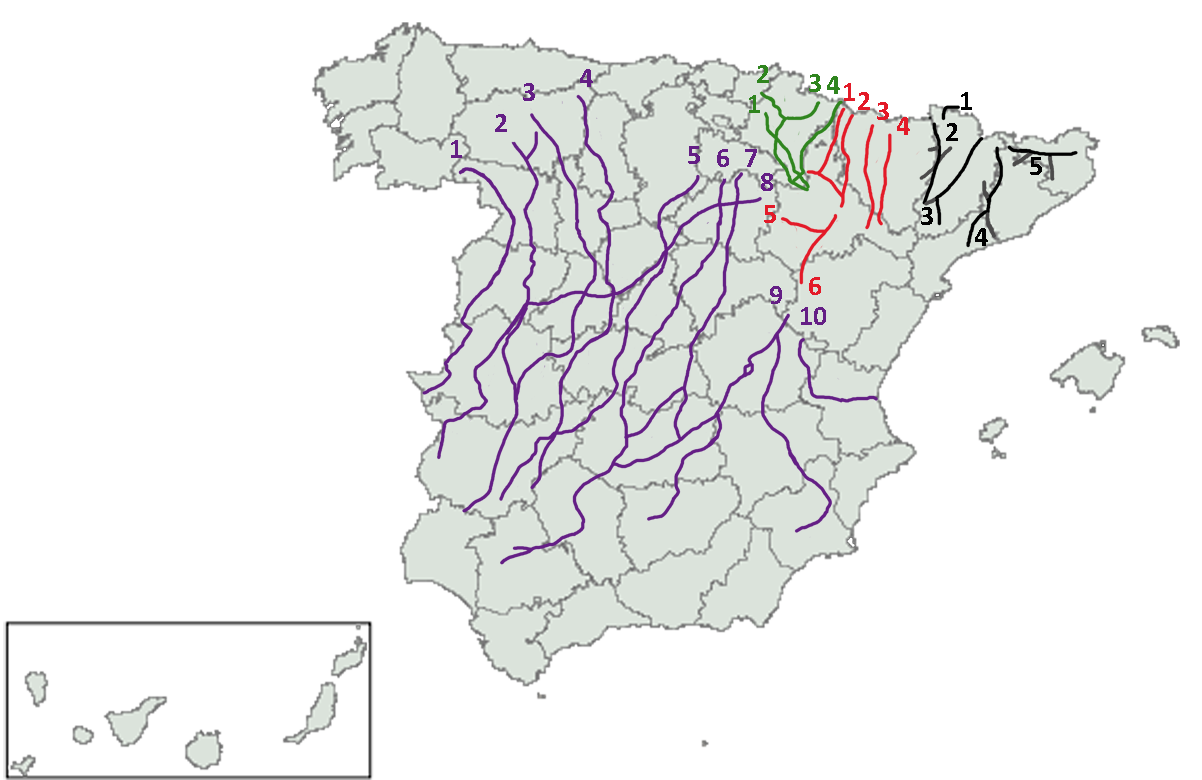
Main transhumance routes in Spain

Transhumance is historically widespread throughout much of Spain, particularly in the regions of Castile, Leon and Extremadura, where nomadic cattle and sheep herders travel long distances in search of greener pastures in summer and warmer climatic conditions in winter. Spanish transhumance is the origin of numerous related cultures in the Americas such as the cowboys of the United States and the Gauchos of Argentina, Paraguay and Brazil.

A network of droveways, or cañadas, crosses the whole peninsula, running mostly south-west to north-east. They have been charted since ancient times, and classified according to width; the standard cañada is between 37.5 to 75 metres (123 to 246 ft) wide, with some cañadas reales (meaning royal droveways) being 800 metres (2,625 ft) wide at certain points. The land within the droveways is publicly owned and protected by law.

In some high valleys of the Pyrenees and the Cantabrian Mountains, transhumant herding has been the main, or only, economic activity. Regulated passes and pasturage have been distributed among different valleys and communities according to the seasonal range of use and community jurisdiction. Unique social groups associated with the transhumant lifestyle are sometimes identified as a remnant of an older ethnic culture now surviving in isolated minorities, such as the "Pasiegos" in Cantabria, "Agotes" in Navarre, and "Vaqueiros de alzada" in Asturias and León.

=== The Pyrenees ===
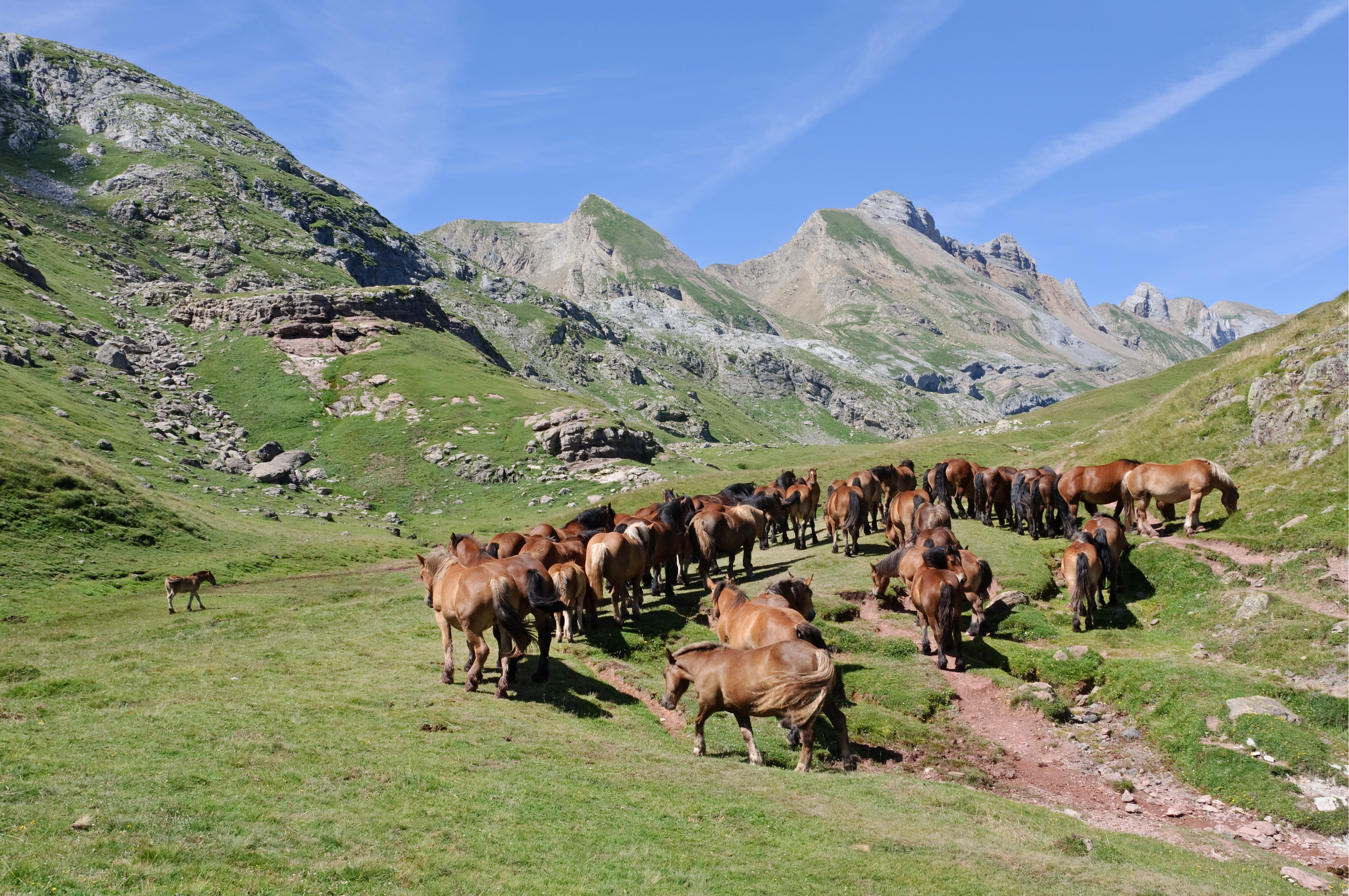
Herd of horses on summer mountain pasture in the Pyrenees

Transhumance in the Pyrenees involves relocation of livestock (cows, sheep, horses) to high mountains during the summer months, because farms in the lowland are too small to support a larger herd all year round. The mountain period starts in late May or early June, and ends in early October. Until the 1970s, transhumance was used mainly for dairy cows, and cheese-making was an important activity in the summer months. In some regions, nearly all members of a family decamped to higher mountains with their cows, living in rudimentary stone cabins for the summer grazing season. That system, which evolved during the Middle Ages, lasted into the 20th century. It declined and broke down under pressure from industrialisation, as people left the countryside for jobs in cities. However, the importance of transhumance continues to be recognised through its celebration in popular festivals.

The Mont Perdu / Monte Perdido region of the Pyrenees has been designated as a UNESCO World Heritage Site by virtue of its association with the transhumance system of agriculture.

=== Scandinavian Peninsula ===
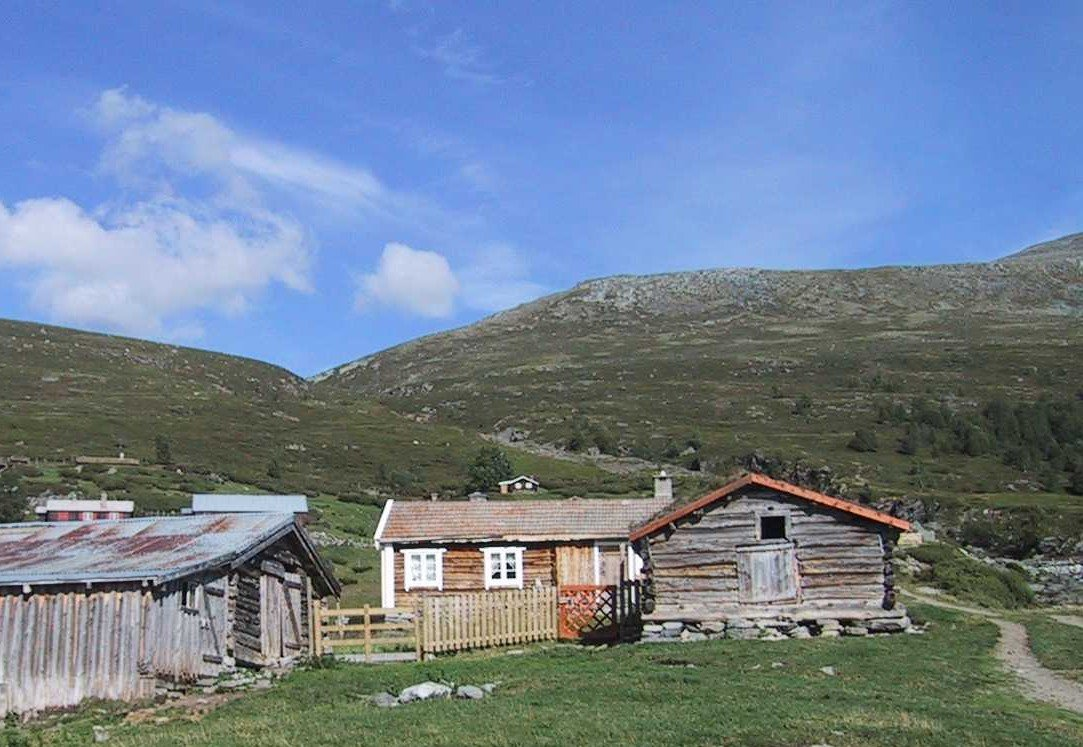
A seter in Gudbrandsdal, Norway. Above the tree line in the mountains, it is used as a dwelling for those who accompany livestock to summer pasture.

In Scandinavia, transhumance is practised to a certain extent; however, livestock are transported between pastures by motorised vehicles, changing the character of the movement. The Sami people practice transhumance with reindeer by a different system than is described immediately below.

The common mountain or forest pasture used for transhumance in summer is called seter or bod / bua. The same term is used for a related mountain cabin, which was used as a summer residence. In summer (usually late June), livestock is moved to a mountain farm, often quite distant from a home farm, to preserve meadows in valleys for producing hay. Livestock is typically tended during the summer by girls and younger women, who also milk and make cheese. Bulls usually remain at the home farm. As autumn approaches and grazing is exhausted, livestock is returned to the farm.

In Sweden, this system was predominantly used in Värmland, Dalarna, Härjedalen, Jämtland, Hälsingland, Medelpad and Ångermanland.

The practice was common throughout most of Norway, due to its highly mountainous nature and limited areas of lowland for cultivation.

The Gudbrandsdal area includes lateral valleys such as Gausdal, Heidal, Vinstra, and Ottadalen. This area comprises lowland parishes about 200 metres (660 ft) above sea-level and mountain parishes about 800 metres (2,600 ft) above sea-level, fertile soil in the main valley and barren summits in Rondane and Dovrefjell. Forests surround those farms, but higher up, woods give way to a treeless mountain plateau. This is the seterfjell, or summer farm region, once of vital importance both as summer pastureland and for haymaking.

While previously many farms had their own seters, it is more usual for several farmers to share a modernised common seter (fellesseter). Most of the old seters have been left to decay or are used as recreational cabins.

The name for the common mountain pasture in most Scandinavian languages derives from the Old Norse term setr. In Norwegian, the term is sæter or seter; in Swedish, säter. The place name appears in Sweden in several forms as Säter and Sätra, and as a suffix: -säter, -sätra, -sätt and -sättra. Those names appear extensively across Sweden with a centre in the Mälaren basin and in Östergötland. The surname "Satter" is derived from these words.

In the heartland of the Swedish transhumance region, the most commonly used term is bod or bua (the word is also used for small storage houses and the like; it has evolved in English as booth); in modern Standard Swedish, fäbod.

The oldest mention of seter in Norway is in Heimskringla, the saga of Olaf II of Norway's travel through Valldal to Lesja.

The practice of summer farming at fäbod and seter in Sweden and Norway has been included in UNESCO's Lists of Intangible Cultural Heritage since 2024.

=== Caucasus and northern Anatolia ===
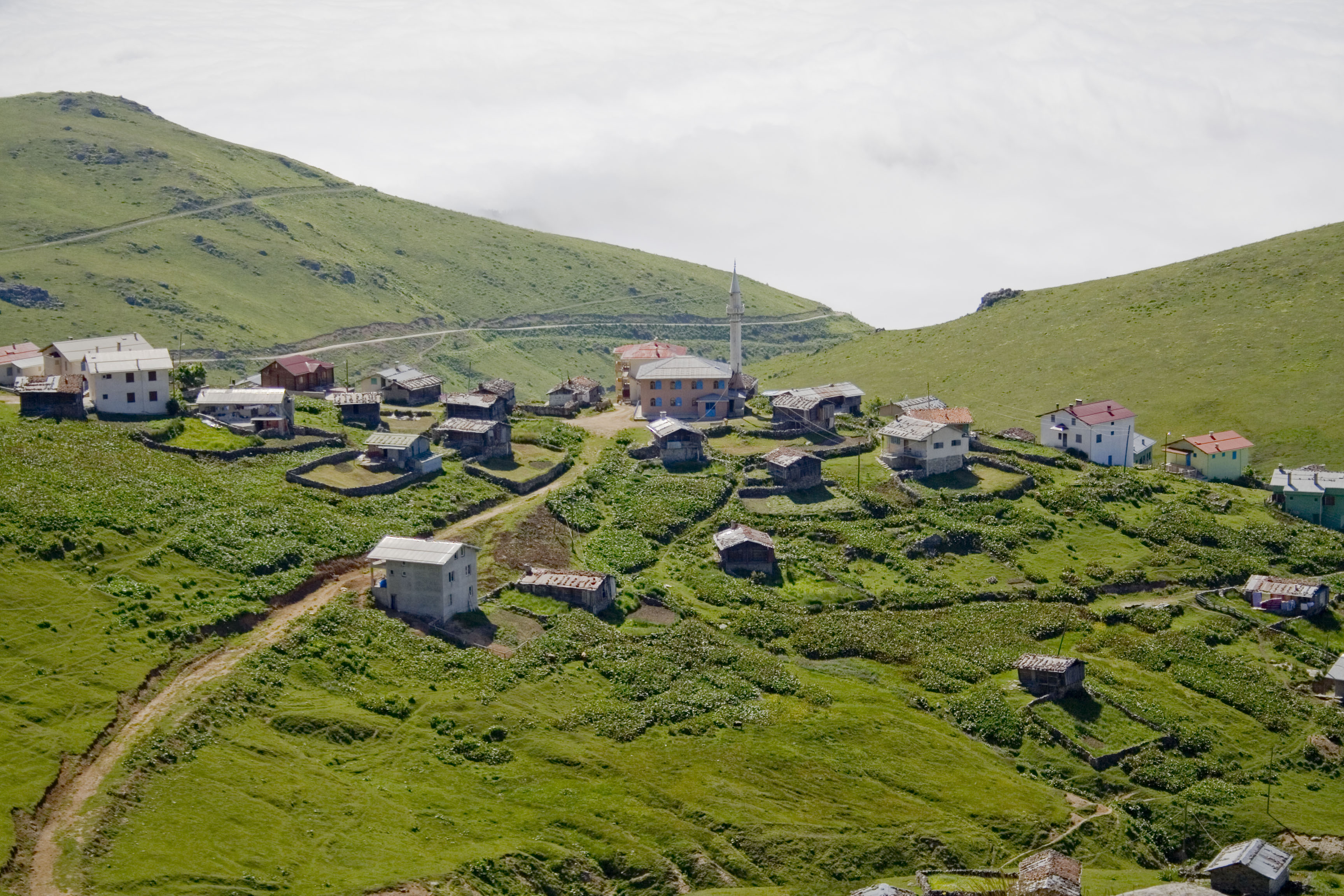
The summer settlement of the village of Ğorğoras in the Çaykara district of Trabzon province, Turkey

In the heavily forested Caucasus Mountains and Pontic Mountains, various peoples still practice transhumance to varying degrees. During the relatively short summer, wind from the Black Sea brings moist air up the steep valleys, which supports fertile grasslands at altitudes up to 2,500 metres (8,202 ft), and a rich tundra at altitudes up to 3,500 metres (11,483 ft). Traditionally, villages were divided into two, three or even four distinct settlements (one for each season) at different heights of a mountain slope. Much of this rural life came to an end during the first half of the 20th century, as the Kemalist and later Soviet governments tried to modernise the societies and stress urban development, rather than maintaining rural traditions.

In the second half of the 20th century, migration for work from the Pontic mountains to cities in Turkey and western Europe, and from the northern Caucasus to Moscow, dramatically reduced the number of people living in transhumance. It is estimated, however, that tens of thousands of rural people still practice these traditions in villages on the northern and southwestern slopes of the Caucasus, in the lesser Caucasus in Armenia, and in the Turkish Black Sea region.

Some communities continue to play out ancient migration patterns. For example, the Pontic Greeks visit the area and the monastery Sumela in the summer. Turks from cities in Europe have built a summer retreat on the former yayla grazing land.

Transhumance related to sheep farming is still practised in Georgia. The shepherds with their flocks have to cross the 2,826 metres (9,272 ft) high Abano Pass from the mountains of Tusheti to the plains of Kakheti. Up until the dissolution of Soviet Union they intensively used the Kizlyar plains of Northern Dagestan for the same purpose.

== Asia ==
=== Afghanistan ===
In Afghanistan, the central Afghan highlands surround the Koh-i-Baba and continue eastward into the Hindu Kush range. Summers are short and cool while winters are very cold. These highlands have mountain pastures during summer (sardsīr), watered by many small streams and rivers. Winter pastures in the neighboring warm lowlands (garmsīr) make the region ideal for seasonal transhumance. The Afghan Highlands contain about 225,000 km^{2} (87,000 sq mi) of summer pasture, which is used by both settled communities and nomadic pastoralists like the Pashtun Kuchis. Major pastures in the region include the Nawur pasture in northern Ghazni Province (whose area is about 600 km^{2} at elevation of up to 3,350 m), and the Shewa pasture and the Little Pamir in eastern Badakhshan Province. The Little Pamir pasture, whose elevation is above 4,000 metres (13,000 ft), is used by the Afghan Kyrgyz to raise livestock.

In Nuristan, the inhabitants live in permanent villages surrounded by arable fields on irrigated terraces. Most of the livestock are goats. They are taken up to a succession of summer pastures each spring by herdsmen while most of the villagers remain behind to irrigate the terraced fields and raise millet, maize, and wheat; work mostly done by the women. In the autumn after the grain and fruit harvest, livestock are brought back to spend the winter stall-fed in stables.

=== India ===
Jammu and Kashmir in India has the world's highest transhumant population as per a survey conducted by a team led by Dr Shahid Iqbal Choudhary, IAS, Secretary to the Government of Jammu and Kashmir, Tribal Affairs Department. The 1st Survey of Transhumance in 2021 captured details of 612,000 members of ethnic tribal communities viz Gujjars, Bakkerwals, Gaddis and Sippis. The survey was carried out for development and welfare planning for these communities notified as Scheduled tribes under the Constitution of India. Subsequent to the survey a number of flagship initiatives were launched by the Government for their welfare and development especially in sectors like healthcare, veterinary services, education, livelihood and transportation support for migration. Transhumance in Jammu and Kashmir is mostly vertical while some families in the plains of the Jammu, Samba and Kathua districts also practice lateral or horizontal transhumance. More than 85% of the migratory transhumant population moves within the Union Territory of Jammu and Kashmir while the remaining 15% undertakes inter-state movement to the neighbouring Punjab State and to the Ladakh Union territory. Gujjars – a migratory tribe – also sparsely inhabit several areas in parts of Punjab, Himachal Pradesh and Uttarakhand. The Gujjar-Bakkerwal tribe represents the highest transhumant population in the world and accounts for nearly 98% of the transhumant population in Jammu and Kashmir. The Bhotiya communities of Uttarakhand historically practiced transhumance. They would spend the winter months at low altitude settlements in the Himalayan foothills, gathering resources to trade in Tibet over the summer. In the summer, they would move up to high-altitude settlements along various river valleys. Traditionally involved in wool cleaning, spinning, and weaving items like shawls and carpets, these villagers now rely on transhumant herders for raw materials as they no longer keep livestock. Some people would remain at these settlements to cultivate farms; some would head to trade marts, crossing high mountain passes into western Tibet, while some others would practice nomadic pastoralism. This historic way of life came to an abrupt halt due to the closure of the Sino-Indian border following the Sino-Indian War of 1962. In the decades following this war, transhumance as a way of life rapidly declined among the Bhotiya people.

The pastoral Gujars of northern India rely on state forests for pasture but face increasing restrictions from the government. This has led to significant impoverishment as they lose traditional grazing land and fall into debt. Transhumant pastoralism, guided by traditional ecological knowledge (TEK), helps the Kinnaura community in Himachal Pradesh adapt to harsh high-altitude conditions. However, this age-old practice is under threat due to socioeconomic, policy, and environmental changes, risking the erosion of pastoralism-related TEK.

=== Iran ===
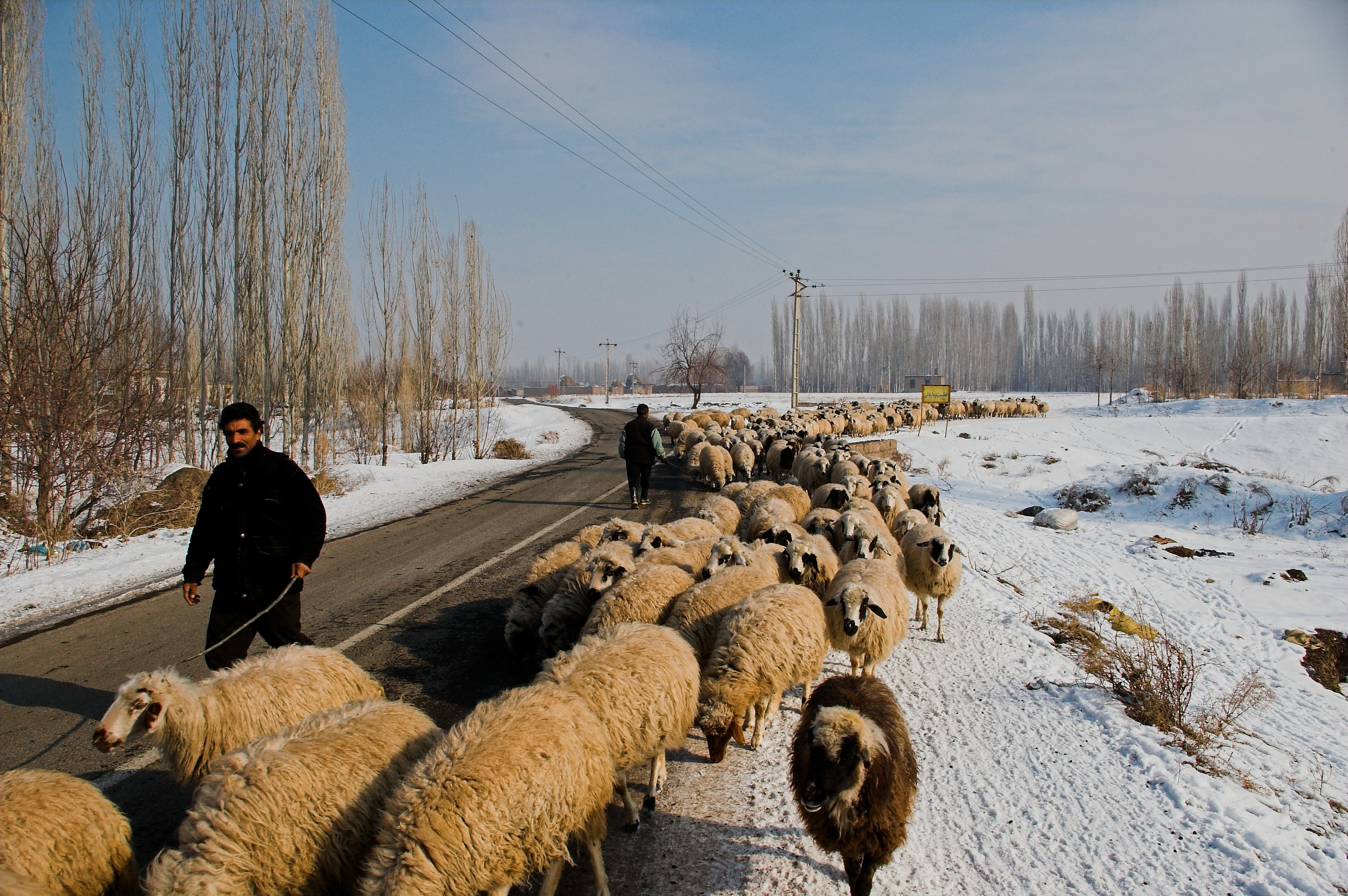
Iranian shepherds moving their sheep

The Bakhtiari tribe of Iran still practised this way of life in the mid-20th century. All along the Zagros Mountains from Azerbaijan to the Arabian Sea, pastoral tribes move back and forth with their herds annually according to the seasons, between their permanent homes in the valley and one in the foothills.

The Qashqai (Kashkai) are a Turkic tribe of southern Iran, who in the mid-20th century still practised transhumance. The tribe was said to have settled in ancient times in the province of Fars, near the Persian Gulf, and by the mid-20th century lived beyond the Makran mountains. In their yearly migrations for fresh pastures, the Kashkai drove their livestock from south to north, where they lived in summer quarters, known as Yaylak, in the high mountains from April to October. They traditionally grazed their flocks on the slopes of the Kuh-e-Dinar, a group of mountains from 12,000 to 15,000 feet (3,700 to 4,600 m), part of the Zagros chain.

In autumn the Kashkai broke camp, leaving the highlands to winter in warmer regions near Firuzabad, Kazerun, Jerrè, Farashband, on the banks of the Mond River. Their winter quarters were known as Kishlak/Qishlaq/Gishlak. The migration was organised and controlled by the Kashkai Chief. The tribes avoided villages and towns, such as Shiraz and Isfahan, because their large flocks, numbering seven million head, could cause serious damage.

In the 1950s, the Kashkai tribes were estimated to number 400,000 people in total. There have been many social changes since that time.

=== Lebanon ===
Examples of fixed transhumance are found in the North Governorate of Lebanon. Towns and villages located in the Qadisha valley are at an average altitude of 1,400 metres (4,593 ft). Some settlements, like Ehden and Kfarsghab, are used during summer periods from the beginning of June until mid-October. Inhabitants move in October to coastal towns situated at an average of 200 metres (656 ft) above sea level. The transhumance is motivated by agricultural activities (historically by the mulberry silkworm culture). The main crops in the coastal towns are olive, grape and citrus. For the mountain towns, the crops are summer fruits, mainly apples and pears. Other examples of transhumance exist in Lebanon.

=== Kyrgyzstan ===
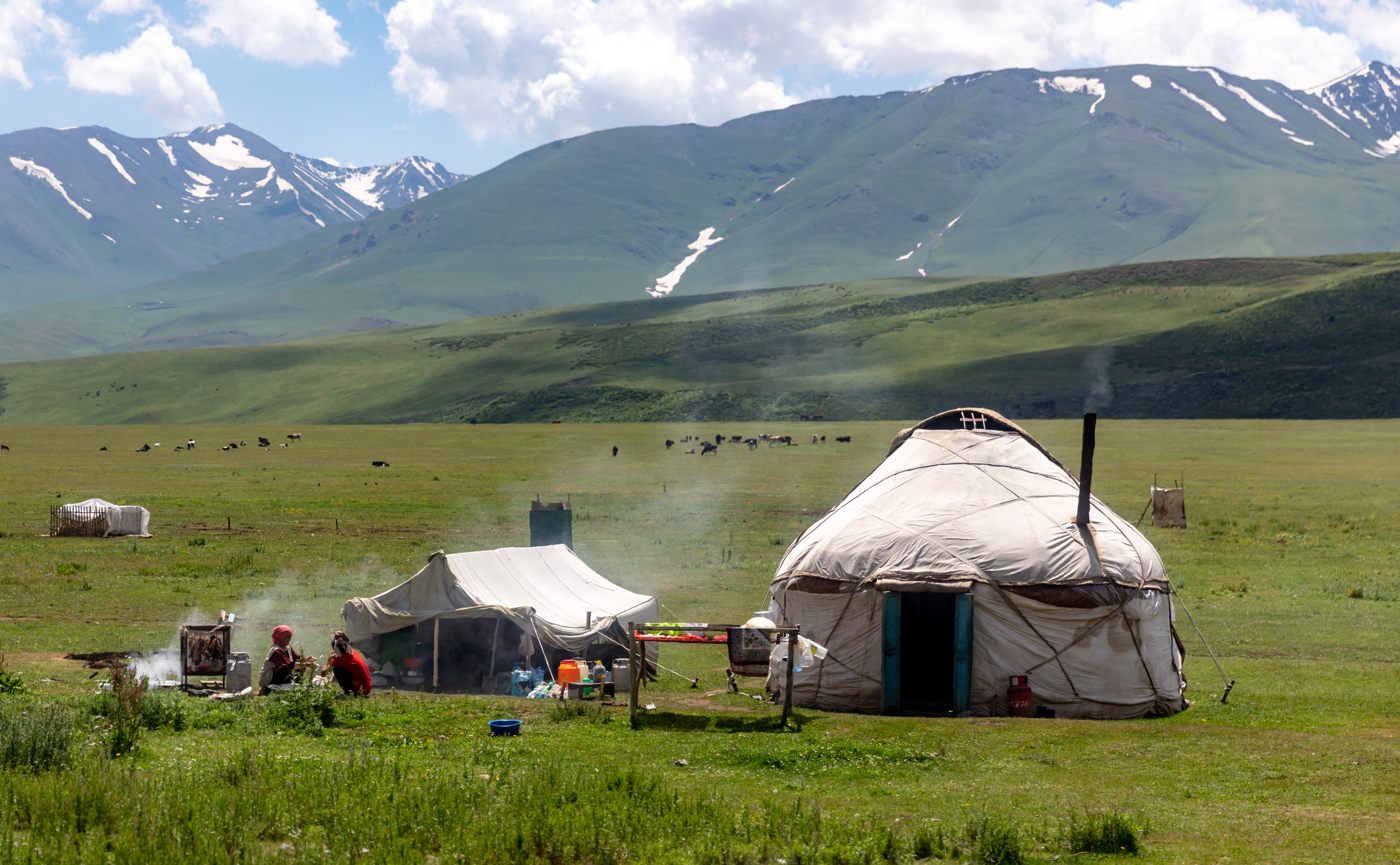
Yurt in Kyrgyzstan

In Kyrgyzstan, transhumance practices, which never ceased during the Soviet period, have undergone a resurgence in the difficult economic times following independence in 1991. Transhumance is integral to Kyrgyz national culture. The people use a wool felt tent, known as the yurt or jailoo, while living on these summer pastures. It is symbolised on their national flag. Those shepherds prize a fermented drink made from mare's milk, known as kumis. A tool used in its production is the namesake for Bishkek, the country's capital city.

=== South and East Asia ===
Transhumance practices are found in temperate areas, above ≈1,000 metres (3,281 ft) in the Himalaya–Hindu Kush area (referred to below as Himalaya); and the cold semi-arid zone north of the Himalaya, through the Tibetan Plateau and northern China to the Eurasian Steppe.

Mongolia, China, Kazakhstan, Kyrgyzstan, Bhutan, India, Nepal and Pakistan all have vestigial transhumance cultures. The Bamar people of Myanmar were transhumance prior to their arrival to the region. In Mongolia, transhumance is used to avoid livestock losses during harsh winters, known as zuds. For regions of the Himalaya, transhumance still provides mainstay for several near-subsistence economies – for example, that of Zanskar in northwest India, Van Gujjars and Bakarwals of Jammu and Kashmir in India, Kham Magar in western Nepal and Gaddis of Bharmaur region of Himachal Pradesh. In some cases, the distances travelled by the people with their livestock may be great enough to qualify as nomadic pastoralism.

== Oceania ==
=== Australia ===
In Australia, which has a large station (i.e., ranch) culture, stockmen provide the labour to move the herds to seasonal pastures.

Transhumant grazing is an important aspect of the cultural heritage of the Australian Alps, an area of which has been included on the Australian National Heritage List. Colonists started using this region for summer grazing in the 1830s, when pasture lower down was poor. The practice continued during the 19th and 20th centuries, helping make pastoralism in Australia viable. Transhumant grazing created a distinctive way of life that is an important part of Australia's pioneering history and culture. There are features in the area that are reminders of transhumant grazing, including abandoned stockman's huts, stock yards and stock routes.

== Africa ==
=== North Africa ===
The Berber people of North Africa were traditionally farmers, living in mountains relatively close to the Mediterranean coast, or oasis dwellers. However, the Tuareg and Zenaga of the southern Sahara practice nomadic transhumance. Other groups, such as the Chaouis, practised fixed transhumance.

=== Horn of Africa ===
In rural areas, the Somali and Afar of Northeast Africa also traditionally practise nomadic transhumance. Their pastoralism is centred on camel husbandry, with additional sheep and goat herding.

The classic, "fixed" transhumance is practiced in the Ethiopian Highlands. During the cropping season the lands around the villages are not accessible for grazing. For instance, farmers with livestock in Dogu'a Tembien organise annual transhumance, particularly towards remote and vast grazing grounds, deep in valleys (where the grass grows early due to temperature) or mountain tops. Livestock will stay there overnight (transhumance) with children and a few adults keeping them.

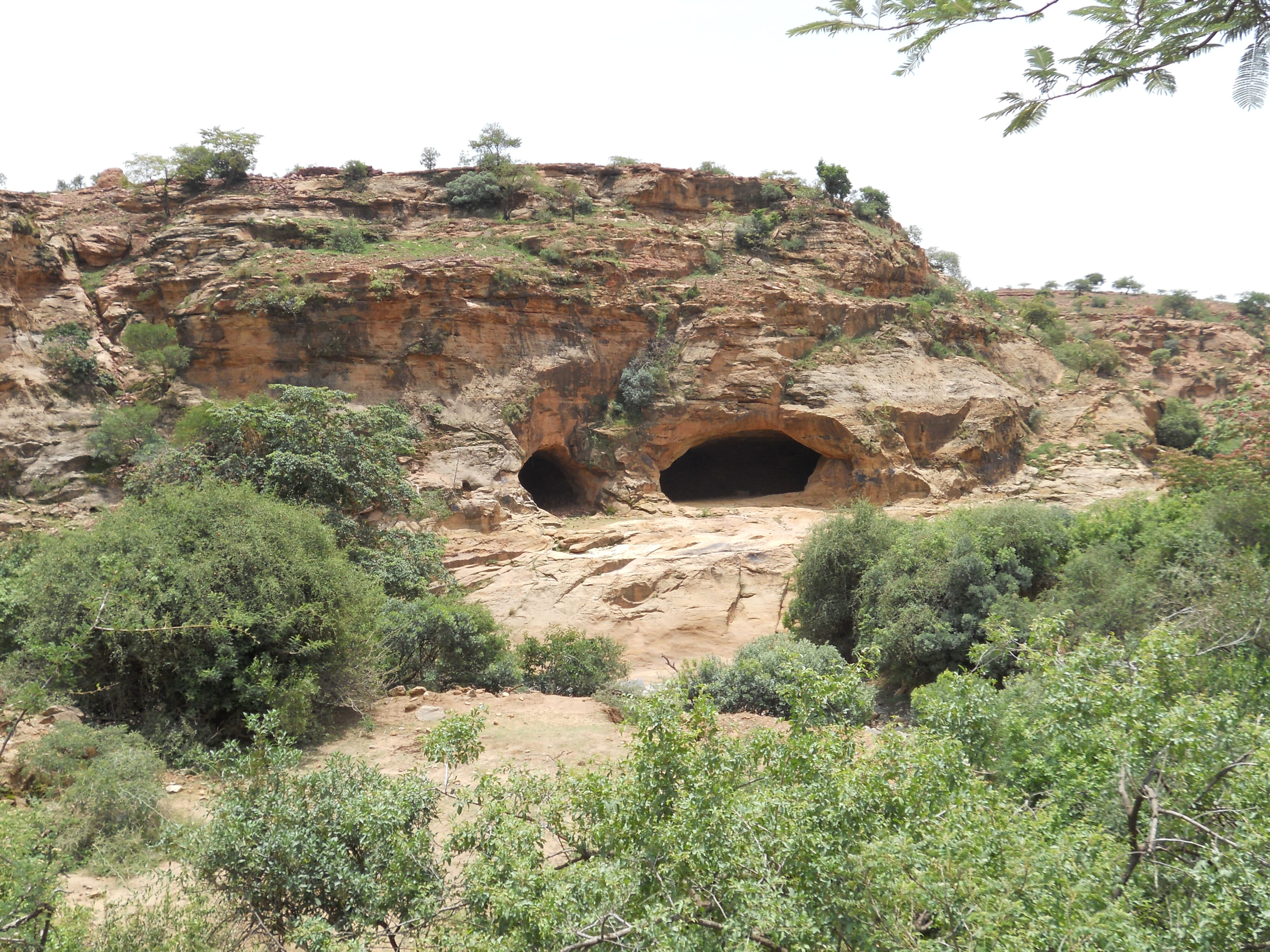
The "red caves" or Kayeh Be’ati in Adigrat Sandstone, a preferred destination for transhumance

For instance, the cattle of Addi Geza'iti (2,580 metres (8,465 ft)) are brought every rainy season to the gorge of River Tsaliet (1,930 metres (6,332 ft)) that holds dense vegetation. The cattle keepers establish enclosures for the cattle and places for them to sleep, often in rock shelters. The cattle stay there until harvesting time, when they are needed for threshing, and when the stubble becomes available for grazing. Many cattle of Haddinnet and also Ayninbirkekin in Dogu'a Tembien are brought to the foot of the escarpment at Ab'aro. Cattle stay on there on wide rangelands. Some cattle keepers move far down to open woodland and establish their camp in large caves in sandstone.

=== East Africa ===
The Pokot community are semi-nomadic pastoralists who are predominantly found in northwestern Kenya and Amudat district of Uganda. The community practices nomadic transhumance, with seasonal movement occurring between grasslands of Kenya (North Pokot sub-county) and Uganda (Amudat, Nakapiripirit and Moroto districts) (George Magak Oguna, 2014).

The Maasai are semi-nomadic people located primarily in Kenya and northern Tanzania who have transhumance cultures that revolve around their cattle.

=== Nigeria ===
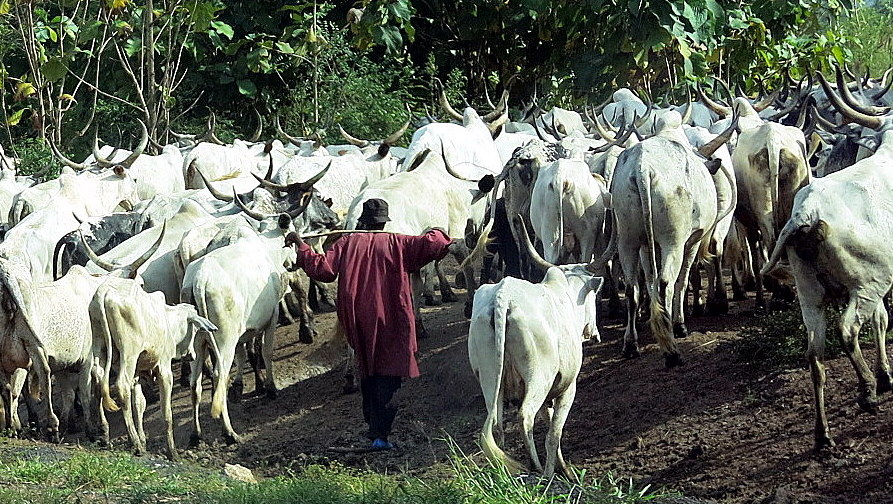
A Fulani herder drives his cattle.

Fulani is the Hausa word for the pastoral peoples of Nigeria belonging to the Fulbe migratory ethnic group. The Fulani rear the majority of Nigeria's cattle, traditionally estimated at 83% pastoral, 17% village cattle and 0.3% peri-urban).

Cattle fulfil multiple roles in agro-pastoralist communities, providing meat, milk and draught power while sales of stock generate income and provide insurance against disasters. They also play a key role in status and prestige and for cementing social relationships such as kinship and marriage. For pastoralists, cattle represent the major household asset.

Pastoralism, as a livelihood, is coming under increased pressure across Africa, due to changing social, economic, political and environmental conditions. Prior to the 1950s, a symbiotic relationship existed between pastoralists, crop farmers and their environment with pastoralists practising transhumance. During the dry season, pastoralists migrated to the southern parts of the Guinea savannah zone, where there was ample pasture and a lower density of crop farmers. In the wet season, these areas faced high challenge from African animal trypanosomiasis transmitted by tsetse flies, so pastoralists would migrate to visit farmlands within the northern Sudan savannah zone, supplying dairy products to the local farming community. Reciprocally, the farming community supplied pastoralists with grain, and after the harvest, cattle were permitted to graze on crop residues in fields leaving behind valuable manure.

=== Angola ===
In Southern Angola, several peoples, chiefly the Ovambo and part of the Nyaneka-Khumbi, have cultures that are entirely organised according to the practice of transhumance.

=== Lesotho ===
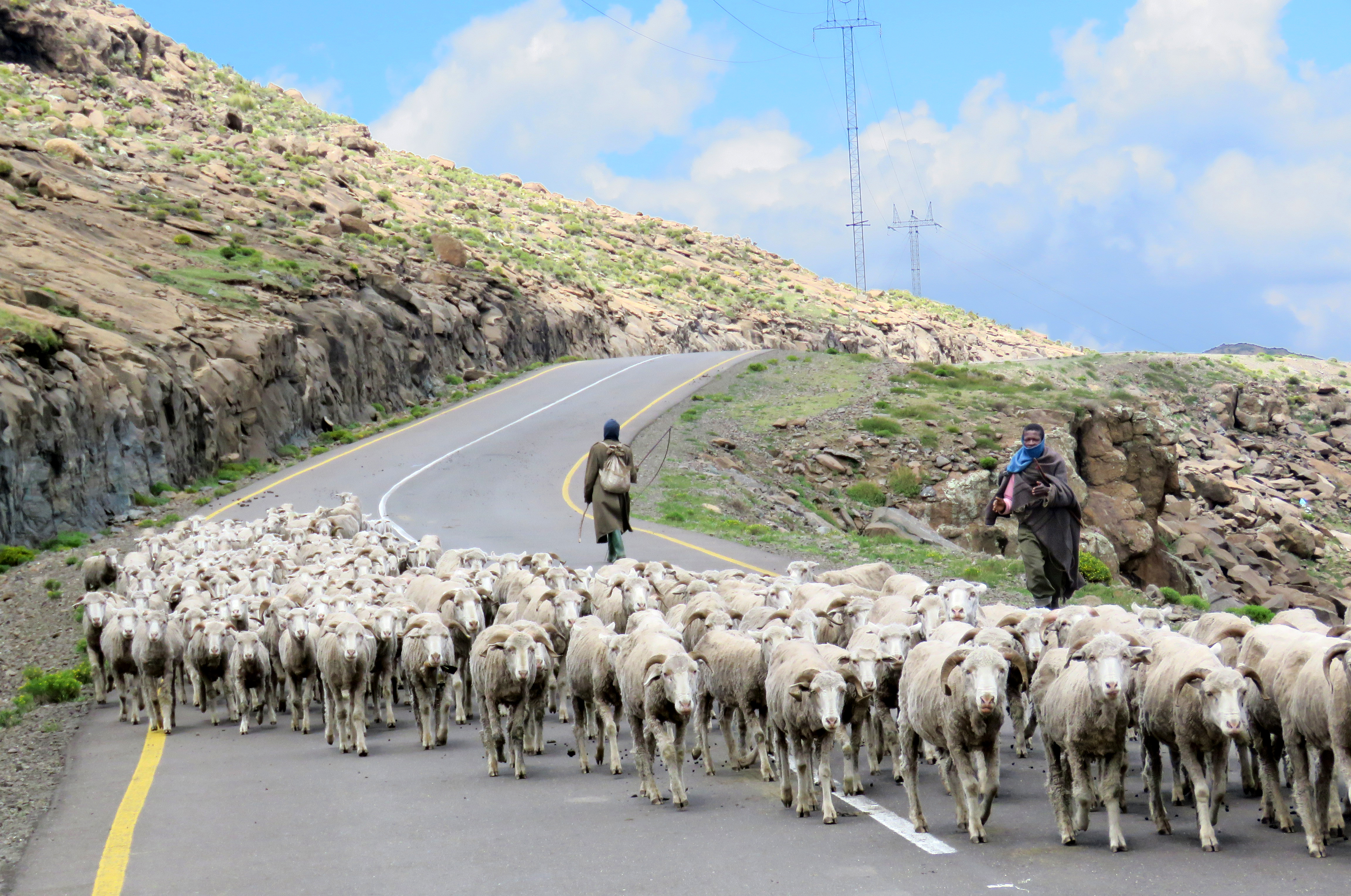
High-mountain shepherds in Lesotho

The traditional economy of the Basotho in Lesotho is based on rearing cattle. They practise a seasonal migration between valley and high plateaus of the Maloti (basalt mountains of Lesotho). Pressure on pasture land has increased due to increases in population, as well as construction of large storage dams in these mountains to provide water to South Africa's arid industrial heartland. Growing pressure on pastures is contributing to degradation of sensitive grasslands and could contribute to sedimentation in man-made lakes. The traditional transhumance pattern has become modified.

=== South Africa ===
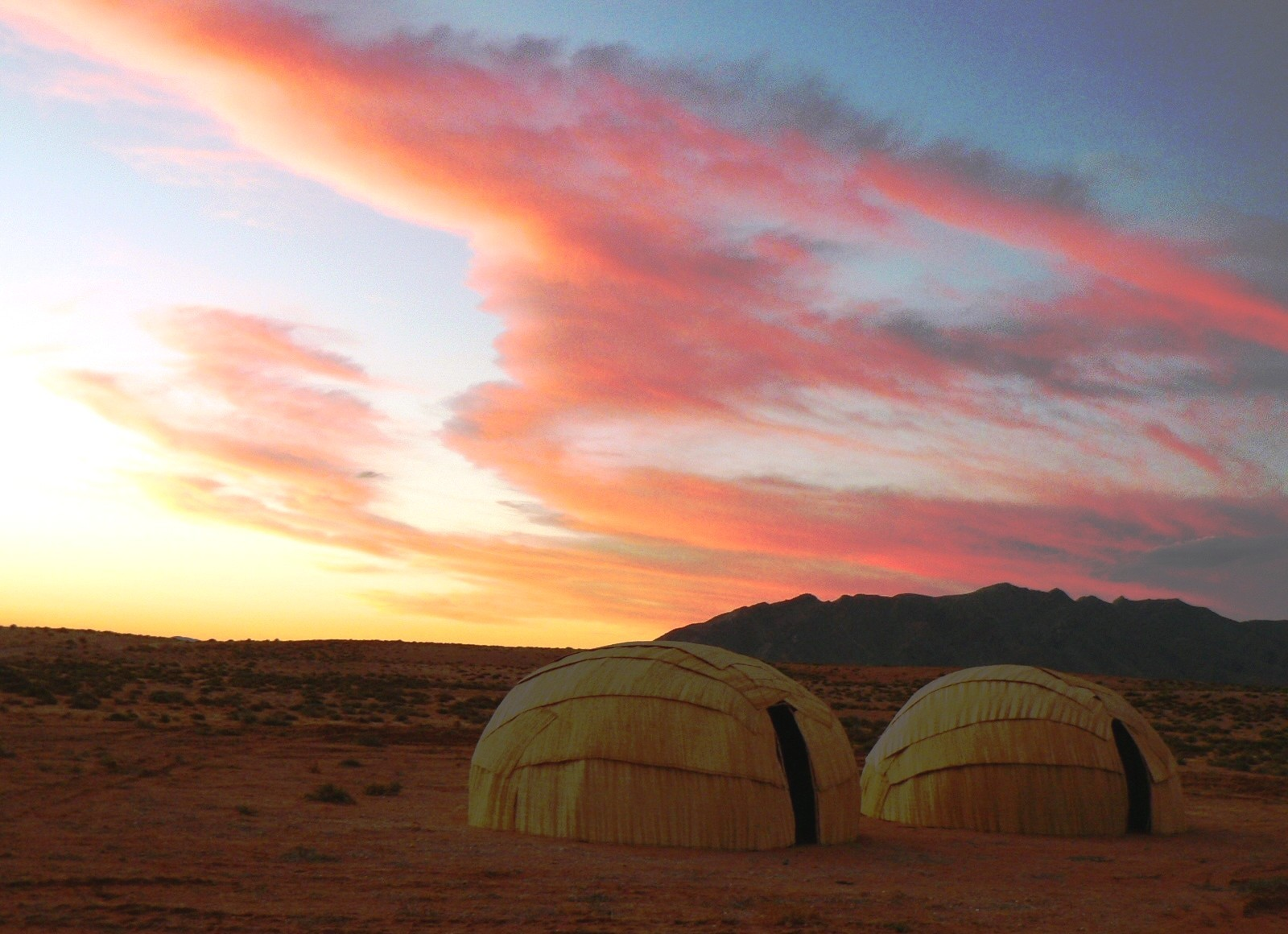
Haru Oms at Glybank near Kuboes in the Richtersveld

In South Africa the transhumance lifestyle of the Nama clan of the Khoikhoi continues in the Richtersveld, a montane-desert located close to the Atlantic coast in the northwestern area of the country. In this area, people move seasonally (three or four times per annum) with their herds of sheep and goats. Transhumance is based on small family units, which use the same camps each year.

A portable, dome tent, called a Matjieshut (Afrikaans for "mat house") or Haru Oms (meaning "rush house" in Nama) is a feature of Khoikhoi culture. These dwellings are used in their seasonal camps in the Richtersveld. It consists of a frame traditionally covered with rush mats. In the 21st century, the people sometimes use a variety of manufactured materials. In recognition of its significance, the Richtersveld has been designated as a UNESCO World Heritage Site.

== North America ==
In the southern Appalachians of the United States in the 19th and early 20th centuries, settlers often pastured livestock, especially sheep, on grassy bald mountain tops where wild oats predominate. Historians have speculated that these "balds" are remnants of ancient bison grazing lands (which were possibly maintained by early native peoples of North America). In the absence of transhumance, these balds have been becoming covered by forest since the late 20th century. It is unclear whether efforts will be made to preserve these historic managed ecosystems.

Transhumance, in most cases relying on use of public land, continues to be an important ranching practice in the western United States. In the northern areas, this tradition was based on moving herds to higher ground with the greening of highland pastures in spring and summer. These uplands are part of large public lands, often under the jurisdiction of the United States Forest Service. In the winter, herds use lowland steppe or desert, also often government land under the jurisdiction of the Bureau of Land Management.

In California and Texas, a greater proportion of the range is held as private land, due to differing historical development of these areas. The general pattern is that in summer, ranch families, hired shepherds, or hired cowboys travel to the mountains and stay in a line camp during the summer. They may also visit the upland ranch regularly, using trailers to transport horses for use in the high country.

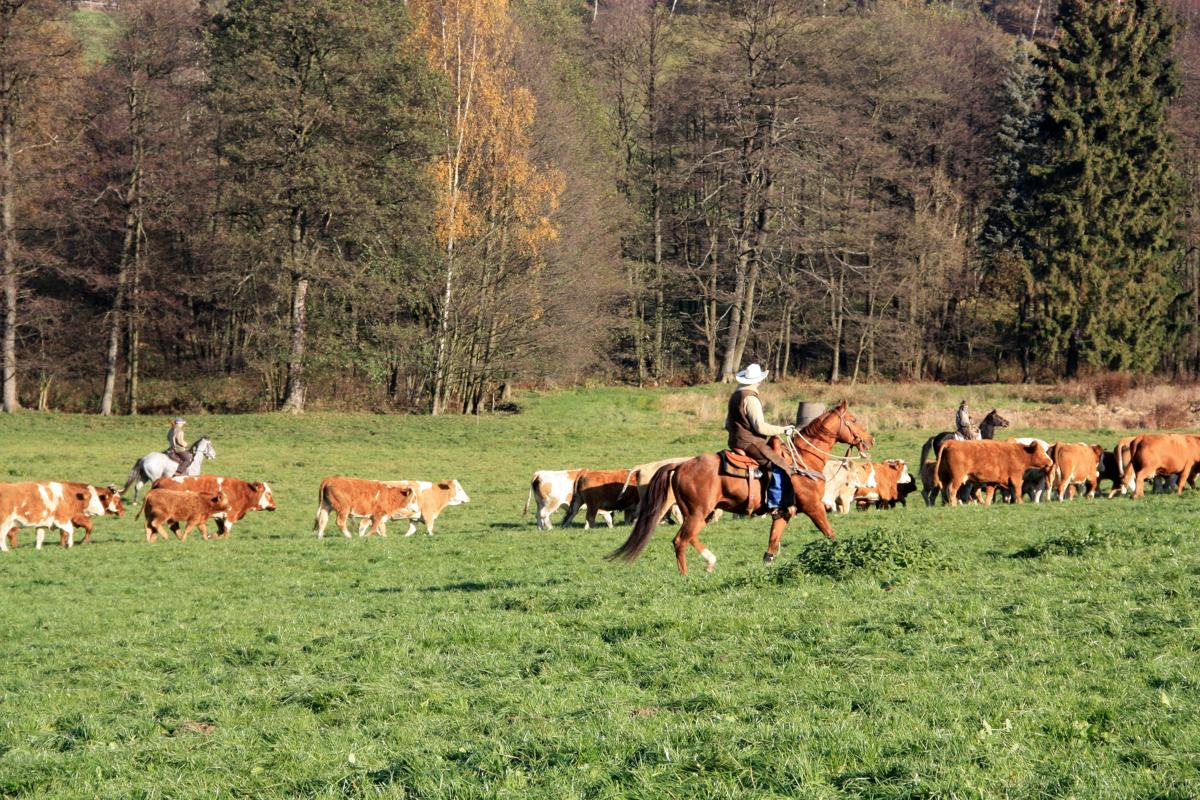
Cowboy herding cattle in Montana

Traditionally in the American West, shepherds spent most of the year with a sheep herd, searching for the best forage in each season. This type of shepherding peaked in the late nineteenth century. Cattle and sheep herds are generally based on private land, although this may be a small part of the total range when all seasons are included. Some sheepmen recruited Basque shepherds to care for the herds, including managing migration between grazing lands. Workers from Peru, Chile (often Native Americans), and Mongolia have now taken shepherd roles; the Basque have bought their own ranches or moved to urban jobs. Shepherds take the sheep into the mountains in the summer (documented in the 2009 film Sweetgrass) and out on the desert in the winter, at times using crop stubble and pasture on private land when it is available. There are a number of different forms of transhumance in the United States:

The Navajo began practicing transhumance in the 1850s, after they were forced out of their traditional homeland in the San Juan River valley. They maintain many sheep.

In California, the home ranch tends to have more private land, largely because of the legacy of the Spanish land grant system. For this reason, extensive acreages of Mediterranean oak woodlands and grasslands are stewarded by ranches whose economy depends on summer range on government land under the jurisdiction of the U.S. Forest Service.

== South America ==
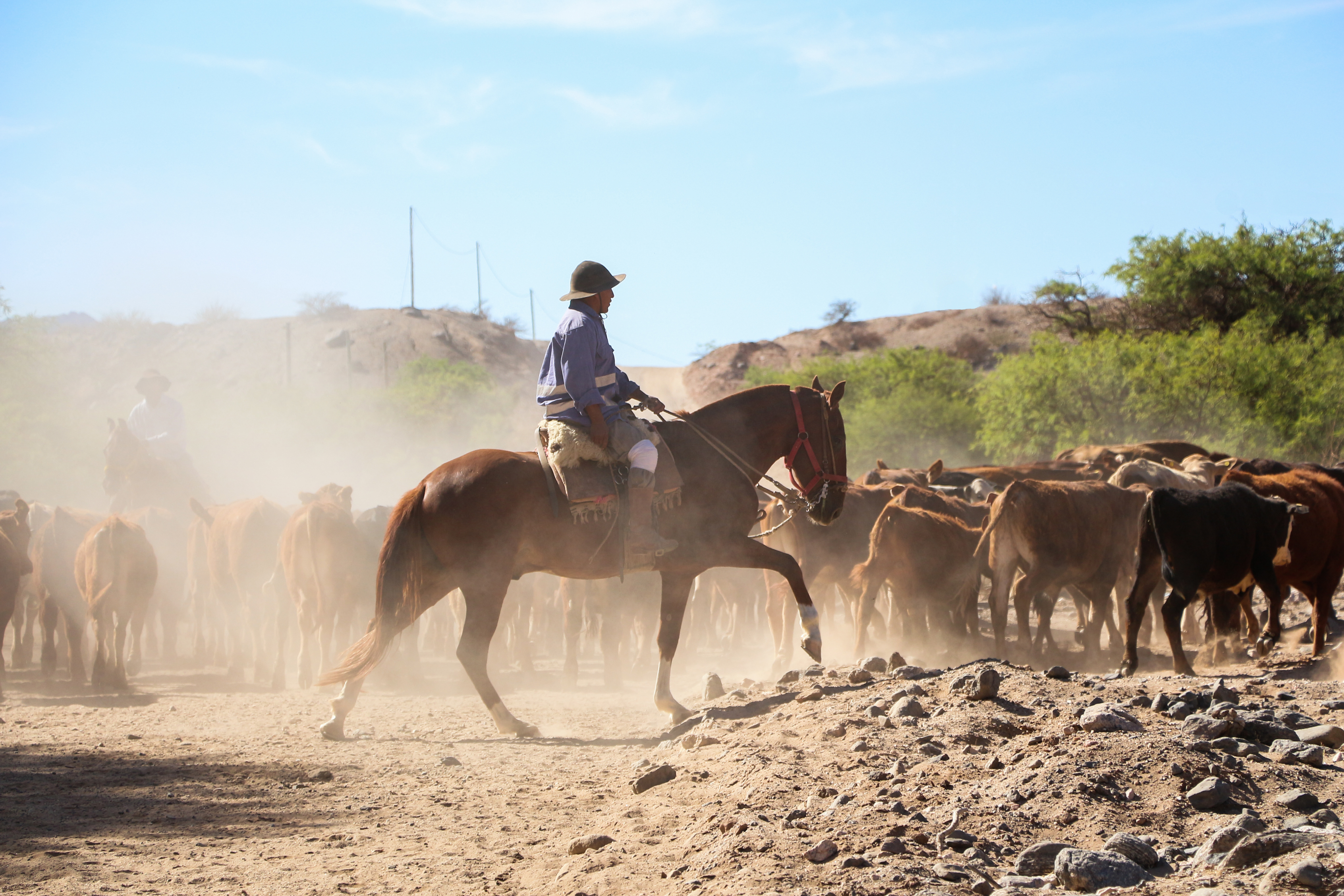
Gauchos in Calchaquí Valleys, Argentina

South American transhumance partially relies on "cowboy" counterparts, the gaucho of Argentina, Uruguay, Paraguay and (with the spelling "gaúcho") southern Brazil, the llanero of Colombia and Venezuela, and the huaso of Chile.

Transhumance is currently practised at least in Argentina, Chile, Peru and Bolivia, as well as in the Brazilian Pantanal. It mainly involves the movement of cattle in the Pantanal and parts of Argentina. In the Altiplano, communities of indigenous people depend on raising camelids, especially llamas. Herds of goats are managed by transhumance in North Neuquén and South Mendoza, while sheep are more used in the Patagonian plains. Criollos and indigenous peoples use transhumant practices in areas of South America.

== See also ==
- Altitudinal migration
- Kuchis
- List of Intangible Cultural Heritage elements in Albania
- Rarámuri
- Sarakatsani
- Seasonal human migration
- Yaylak

== Sources ==
- Jones, Schuyler. "Transhumance Reconsidered". Journal of the Royal Anthropological Institute, London, 2005.
- Costello, Eugene & Svensson, Eva (eds.). Historical Archaeologies Of Transhumance Across Europe Routledge, London, 2018.
- Jones, Schuyler. Men of Influence: Social Control & Dispute Settlement in Waigal Valley, Afghanistan. Seminar Press, London & New York, 1974.
- This article incorporates text from a free content work. Licensed under CC BY 4.0. Text taken from Ducrotoy, Marie Julie; Majekodunmi, Ayodele O.; Shaw, Alexandra P. M.; Bagulo, Husein; Musa, Usman Baba; Bertu, Wilson J.; Gusi, Amahyel Madu; Ocholi, Reuben A.; Bryssinckx, Ward; Welburn, Susan C. (December 2016). "Fulani cattle productivity and management in the Kachia Grazing Reserve, Nigeria". Pastoralism. 6 (1) 25. Bibcode:2016Pasto...6...25D. doi:10.1186/s13570-016-0072-y. hdl:20.500.11820/207dc3db-5f84-4b1d-b340-2dcf239f45ea. S2CID 9938353.
