= Subarctic climate =

Climate characterised by long, usually very cold winters, and short, cool summers

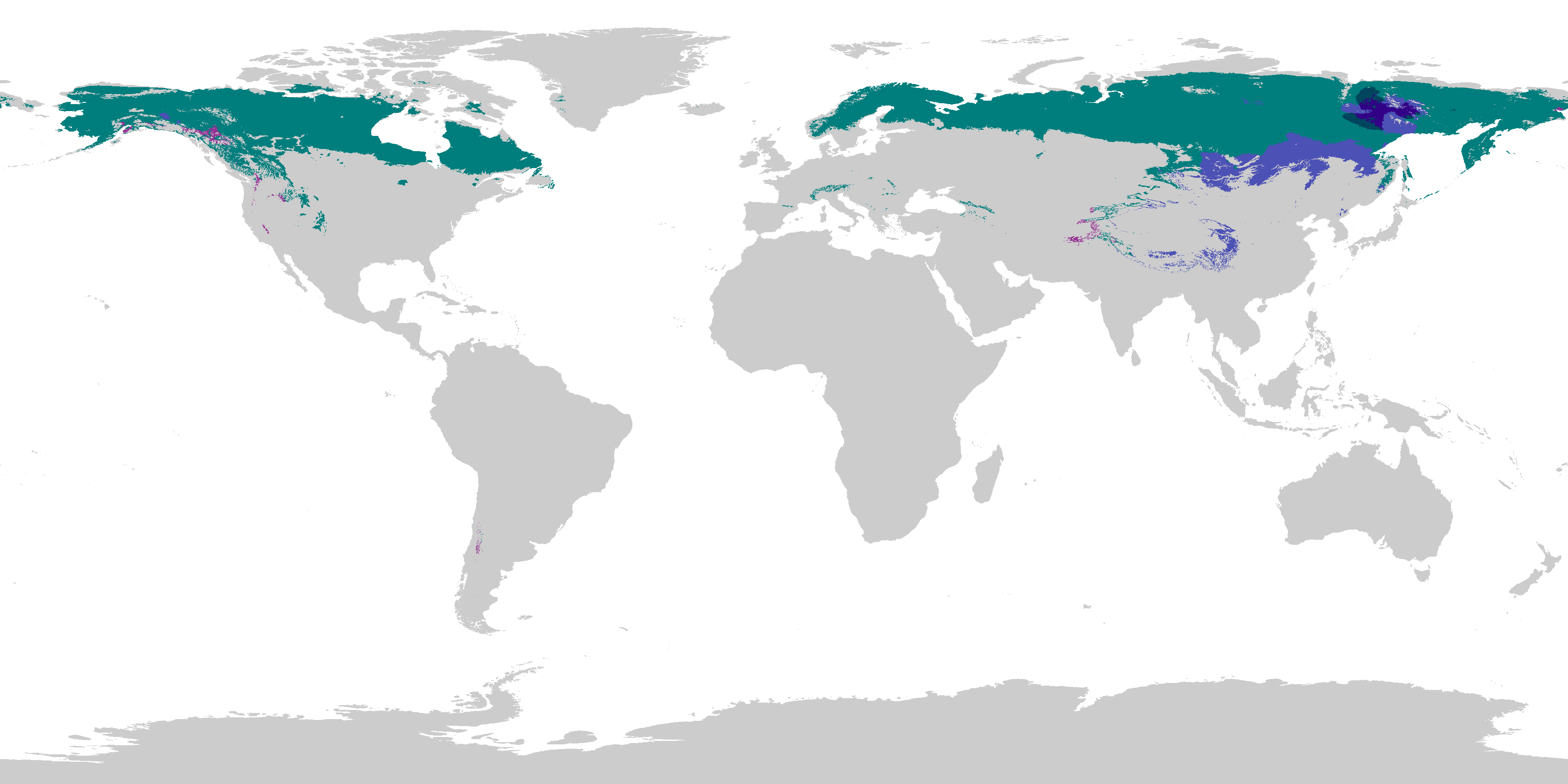
Subarctic climate worldwide as of 1991-2020, using the −3 °C (27 °F) threshold for the coldest month.: Dsc Dsd / Dwc Dwd / Dfc Dfd

The subarctic climate (also called subpolar climate, or boreal climate) is a continental climate with long, cold (often very cold) winters, and short, warm to cool summers. It is found on large landmasses, often away from the moderating effects of an ocean, generally at latitudes from 50°N to 70°N, poleward of the humid continental climates. Like other Class D climates, they are rare in the Southern Hemisphere, only found at some isolated highland elevations. Subarctic or boreal climates are the source regions for the cold air that affects temperate latitudes to the south in winter. These climates represent Köppen climate classification Dfc, Dwc, Dsc, Dfd, Dwd and Dsd.

== Description ==
This type of climate offers some of the most extreme seasonal temperature variations found on the planet: in winter, temperatures can drop to below −50 °C (−58 °F) and in summer, the temperature may exceed 26 °C (79 °F). However, the summers are short; no more than three months of the year (but at least one month) must have a 24-hour average temperature of at least 10 °C (50 °F) to fall into this category of climate, and the coldest month should average below 0 °C (32 °F) (or −3 °C (27 °F)). Record low temperatures can approach −70 °C (−94 °F).

With 5–8 consecutive months when the average temperature is below freezing, all moisture in the soil and subsoil freezes solidly to depths of many feet. Summer warmth is insufficient to thaw more than a few surface feet, so permafrost prevails under most areas not near the southern boundary of this climate zone. Seasonal thaw penetrates from 2 to 14 ft (0.6 to 4.3 m), depending on latitude, aspect, and type of ground. Some northern areas with subarctic climates located near oceans (southern Alaska, northern Norway, Sakhalin Oblast and Kamchatka Oblast), have milder winters and no permafrost, and are more suited for farming unless precipitation is excessive. The frost-free season is very short, varying from about 45 to 100 days at most, and a freeze can occur anytime outside the summer months in many areas.

=== Description ===
The first D indicates continentality, with the coldest month below 0 °C (32 °F) (or −3 °C (27 °F)).

The second letter denotes precipitation patterns:

- s: A dry summer—the driest month in the high-sun half of the year (April to September in the Northern Hemisphere, October to March in the Southern Hemisphere) has less than 30 millimetres (1.18 in)/40 millimetres (1.57 in) of rainfall and has exactly or less than 1/3 the precipitation of the wettest month in the low-sun half of the year (October to March in the Northern Hemisphere, April to September in the Southern Hemisphere),
- w: A dry winter—the driest month in the low-sun half of the year has exactly or less than one‑tenth of the precipitation found in the wettest month in the summer half of the year,
- f: No dry season—does not meet either of the alternative specifications above; precipitation and humidity are often high year-round.

The third letter denotes temperature:

- c: Regular subarctic, only one–three months above 10 °C (50.0 °F), coldest month between 0 °C (32 °F) (or −3 °C (27 °F)) and −38 °C (−36.4 °F).
- d: Severely cold subarctic, only one–three months above 10 °C (50.0 °F), coldest month at or below −38 °C (−36.4 °F).

=== Precipitation ===
Most subarctic climates have little precipitation, typically no more than 380 mm (15 in) over an entire year due to the low temperatures and evapotranspiration. Away from the coasts, precipitation occurs mostly in the summer months, while in coastal areas with subarctic climates the heaviest precipitation is usually during the autumn months when the relative warmth of sea vis-à-vis land is greatest. Low precipitation, by the standards of more temperate regions with longer summers and warmer winters, is typically sufficient in view of the very low evapotranspiration to allow a water-logged terrain in many areas of subarctic climate and to permit snow cover during winter, which is generally persistent for an extended period.

A notable exception to this pattern is that subarctic climates occurring at high elevations in otherwise temperate regions have extremely high precipitation due to orographic lift. Mount Washington, with temperatures typical of a subarctic climate, receives an average rain-equivalent of 101.91 inches (2,588.5 mm) of precipitation per year. Coastal areas of Khabarovsk Krai also have much higher precipitation in summer due to orographic influences (up to 175 millimetres (6.9 in) in July in some areas), whilst the mountainous Kamchatka peninsula and Sakhalin island are even wetter, since orographic moisture isn't confined to the warmer months and creates large glaciers in Kamchatka. Labrador, in eastern Canada, is similarly wet throughout the year due to the semi-permanent Icelandic Low and can receive up to 1,300 millimetres (51 in) of rainfall equivalent per year, creating a snow cover of up to 1.5 metres (59 in) that does not melt until June.

=== Vegetation and land use ===
Vegetation in regions with subarctic climates is generally of low diversity, as only hardy tree species can survive the long winters and make use of the short summers. Trees are mostly limited to conifers, as few broadleaved trees are able to survive the very low temperatures in winter. This type of forest is also known as taiga, a term which is sometimes applied to the climate found therein as well. Even though the diversity may be low, the area and numbers are high, and the taiga (boreal) forest is the largest forest biome on the planet, with most of the forests located in Russia and Canada. The process by which plants become acclimated to cold temperatures is called hardening.

Agricultural potential is generally poor, due to the natural infertility of soils and the prevalence of swamps and lakes left by departing ice sheets, and short growing seasons prohibit all but the hardiest of crops. Despite the short season, the long summer days at such latitudes do permit some agriculture. In some areas, ice has scoured rock surfaces bare, entirely stripping off the overburden. Elsewhere, rock basins have been formed and stream courses dammed, creating countless lakes.

=== Neighboring regions ===
Should one go northward or even toward a polar sea, one finds that the warmest month has an average temperature of less than 10 °C (50 °F), and the subarctic climate grades into a tundra climate not at all suitable for trees. Southward, this climate grades into the humid continental climates with longer summers (and usually less-severe winters) allowing broadleaf trees. In a few locations close to a temperate sea (as in northern Norway and southern Alaska), this climate can grade into a short-summer version of an oceanic climate, the subpolar oceanic climate, as the sea is approached where winter temperatures average near or above freezing despite maintaining the short, cool summers. In China and Mongolia, as one moves southwestwards or towards lower elevations, temperatures increase but precipitation is so low that the subarctic climate grades into a cold semi-arid climate.

=== Mountains ===
On high mountains, in both tropical and temperate latitudes, subarctic climates may occur. These are also known as subalpine climates. They are generally warmer than continental varieties, but are much wetter. They occupy elevations between 1,400 - 2,500m in temperate regions and above 3-4,000m in warm tropical regions. They generally grade into tundra climates (Köppen:ET), also known as alpine climates above the alpine tree line and below grade into Humid continental climates (Köppen:Dfb), or, rarely, Subpolar oceanic climates (Köppen:Cfc) or subtropical highland climates (Köppen:Cfb)

== Distribution ==
=== Dfc and Dfd distribution ===
The Dfc climate, by far the most common subarctic type, is found in the following areas:

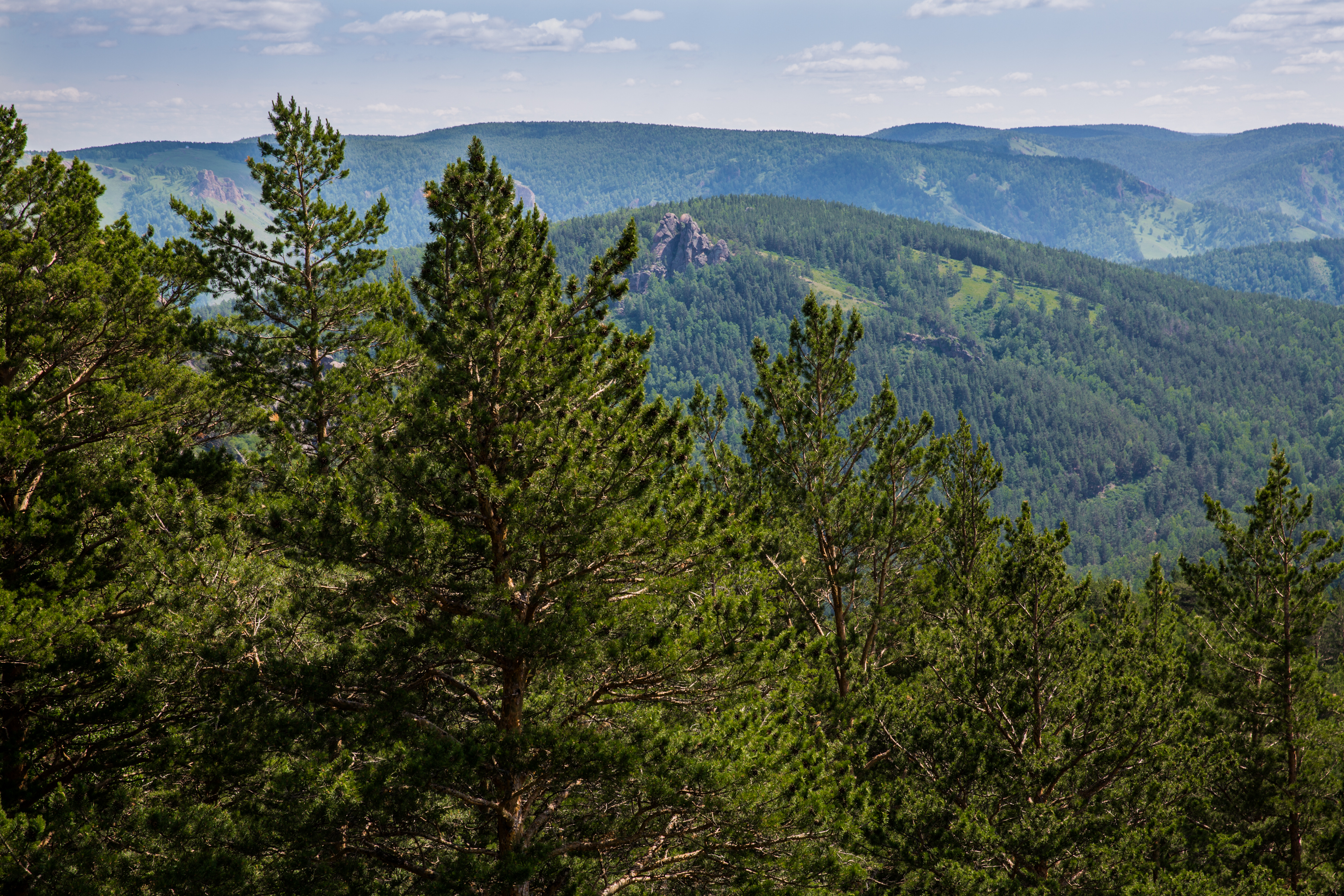
View of pines in the Kuysumy mountains in Siberia

- Eurasia
  - The majority of Siberia (notable cities: Yakutsk, Surgut, Norilsk, Magadan)
  - The Kamchatka Peninsula and the northern and central parts of the Kuril Islands and Sakhalin Island (notable cities: Petropavlovsk-Kamchatsky)
  - Northern European Russia (notable cities: Murmansk, Arkhangelsk, Vorkuta)
  - The northern half of Fennoscandia (milder winters in coastal areas) and higher elevations further south (notable cities: Oulu, Umeå, Tromsø)
  - The Western Alps between 1,600 and 2,100 meters (5,249 and 6,890 ft), and the Eastern Alps between 1,450 and 1,800 meters (4,757 and 5,906 ft)
  - Central Romania
  - Some parts of central Germany and Poland
  - The Tatra Mountains in Poland and Slovakia, above 800 meters (2,625 ft).
  - The Pyrenees, between 1,600 and 2,100 meters (5,249 and 6,890 ft)
  - The Northeastern Anatolia Region and the Pontic Alps, between 1,600 and 2,100 meters (5,249 and 6,890 ft)
  - Mountain summits in Scotland, most notably in the Cairngorms and the Nevis Range
  - The far northeast of Turkey

Further north and east in Siberia, continentality increases so much that winters can be exceptionally severe, averaging below −38 °C (−36 °F), even though the hottest month still averages more than 10 °C (50 °F). This creates Dfd climates, which are mostly found in the Sakha Republic:

- Northeast Siberian taiga
- Central Yakutian Lowland
- Oymyakon
- Verkhoyansk

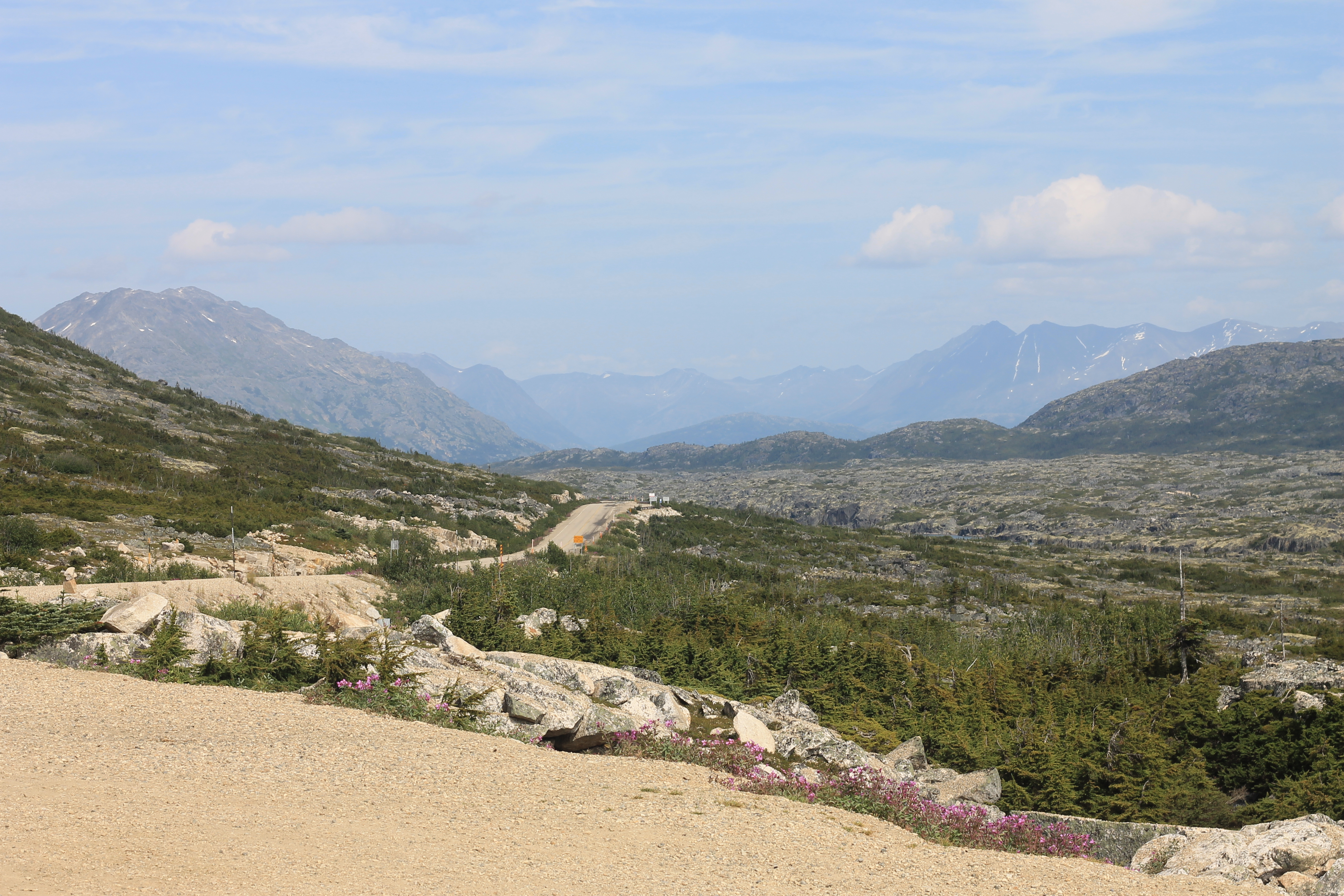
Subarctic climate in Alaska, near Yukon

- North America
  - Most of Interior, Western and Southcentral Alaska (notable cities and towns: Anchorage, Wasilla, Nome, Bethel, Fort Yukon)
  - The high Rocky Mountains in Colorado, Wyoming, Idaho, Utah, Montana and the White Mountains of New Hampshire (notable locations: Fraser, Brian Head)
  - Much of Canada from about 53–55°N to the tree line, including:
    - Southern Labrador (notable cities: Labrador City)
    - Certain areas within Newfoundland interior and along its northern coast
    - Quebec: Jamésie, Côte-Nord and far southern Nunavik (Notable locations: Inukjuak, Kuujjuaq, Sept-Îles)
    - Far northern Ontario
    - The northern Prairie Provinces (Notable locations: Fort McMurray, Churchill)
    - The Rocky Mountain Foothills in Alberta and British Columbia
    - Most of the Yukon (Notable cities: Whitehorse, Dawson City)
    - Most of the Northwest Territories (Notable cities: Yellowknife, Inuvik)
    - Southwestern Nunavut (Notable locations: Baker Lake, Rankin Inlet)

In the Southern Hemisphere, the Dfc climate is found only in small, isolated pockets in the Snowy Mountains of Australia, the Southern Alps of New Zealand, and the Lesotho Highlands. In South America, this climate occurs on the western slope of the central Andes in Chile and Argentina, where climatic conditions are notably more humid compared to the eastern slope. The presence of the Andes mountain range contributes to a wetter climate on the western slope by capturing moisture from the Pacific Ocean, resulting in increased precipitation, especially during the winter months. This climate zone supports the presence of temperate rainforests, mostly on highest areas of the Valdivian rainforest in Chile and the subantarctic forest in Argentina.

=== Dsc and Dsd distribution ===
Climates classified as Dsc or Dsd, with a dry summer, are rare, occurring in very small areas at high elevation around the Mediterranean Basin; Iran; Kyrgyzstan; Tajikistan; Alaska and other parts of the northwestern United States (Eastern Washington, Eastern Oregon, Southern Idaho, California's Eastern Sierra); the Russian Far East; Akureyri, Iceland; Seneca, Oregon; and Atlin, British Columbia. Turkey and Afghanistan are exceptions; Dsc climates are common in Northeast Anatolia, in the Taurus and Köroğlu Mountains, and the Central Afghan highlands.

In the Southern Hemisphere, the Dsc climate is present in South America as a subarctic climate influenced by Mediterranean characteristics, often considered a high-altitude variant of the Mediterranean climate. It is located on the eastern slopes of the central Argentine Andes and in some sections on the Chilean side. While there are no major settlements exhibiting this climate, several localities in the vicinity experience it, such as San Carlos de Bariloche, Villa La Angostura, San Martín de los Andes, Balmaceda, Punta de Vacas, and Termas del Flaco.

=== Dwc and Dwd distribution ===
Climates classified as Dwc or Dwd, with a dry winter, are found in parts of East Asia, like China, where the Siberian High makes the winters colder than places like Scandinavia or Alaska interior but extremely dry (typically with around 5 millimeters (0.20 in) of rainfall equivalent per month), meaning that winter snow cover is very limited. The Dwc climate can be found in:

- Much of northern Mongolia
- Russia:
  - Most of Khabarovsk Krai except the south
  - Southeastern Sakha Republic
  - Southern Magadan Oblast
  - Northern Amur Oblast
  - Northern Buryatia
  - Zabaykalsky Krai
  - Irkutsk Oblast
- China:
  - Tahe County and Mohe County in Heilongjiang
  - Northern Hulunbuir in Inner Mongolia
  - Gannan in Gansu (due to extreme elevation)
  - Huangnan, eastern Hainan and eastern Guoluo in Qinghai (due to extreme elevation)
  - Most of Garzê and Ngawa Autonomous Prefectures (due to extreme elevation) in Sichuan
  - Most of Qamdo Prefecture (due to extreme elevation) in the Tibet Autonomous Region
- Parts of Ladakh (including Siachen Glacier) and Spiti regions of India
- Middle reaches of the Himalayas in Nepal, Bhutan, Myanmar, and Northeast India.
- Parts of Kaema Plateau (including Mount Baekdu, Samjiyon, Musan) in North Korea
- Southeast Fairbanks Census Area in Alaska

In the Southern Hemisphere, small pockets of the Lesotho Highlands and the Drakensberg Mountains have a Dwc classification.

== Charts of selected sites ==
Anchorage, Alaska, United States

Climate chart (precipitation, max. and min. temperature)
J	F	M	A	M	J	J	A	S	O	N	D
19 −5 −12	22 −3 −9	18 1 −7	11 7 −1	17 14 4	26 17 9	46 19 12	74 18 11	79 13 6	46 6 −1	30 −2 −8	28 −4 −10
- █ Average max. and min. temperatures in °C
- █ Precipitation totals in mm
- Source: U.S. Climate Data
Imperial conversion
J	F	M	A	M	J	J	A	S	O	N	D
0.7 23 11	0.9 27 15	0.7 33 19	0.4 45 30	0.7 56 40	1 63 48	1.8 66 53	2.9 64 51	3.1 56 43	1.8 42 31	1.2 29 18	1.1 25 14
- █ Average max. and min. temperatures in °F
- █ Precipitation totals in inches

Whitehorse, Yukon, Canada

Climate chart (precipitation, max. and min. temperature)
J	F	M	A	M	J	J	A	S	O	N	D
22 −11 −19	15 −7 −17	12 −1 −12	8.4 7 −4	15 14 2	35 19 6	39 21 9	39 19 7	31 12 3	23 4 −3	24 −5 −12	16 −9 −17
- █ Average max. and min. temperatures in °C
- █ Precipitation totals in mm
- Source: Environment and Climate Change Canada
Imperial conversion
J	F	M	A	M	J	J	A	S	O	N	D
0.9 12 −2	0.6 19 2	0.5 30 10	0.3 45 25	0.6 58 35	1.4 67 43	1.5 69 47	1.5 65 45	1.2 54 37	0.9 40 27	0.9 22 11	0.6 16 2
- █ Average max. and min. temperatures in °F
- █ Precipitation totals in inches

Yellowknife, Northwest Territories, Canada

Climate chart (precipitation, max. and min. temperature)
J	F	M	A	M	J	J	A	S	O	N	D
15 −22 −29	11 −18 −27	14 −11 −23	12 0 −11	16 10 0	29 19 9	40 22 13	44 18 11	43 11 4	29 2 −4	26 −9 −16	15 −18 −26
- █ Average max. and min. temperatures in °C
- █ Precipitation totals in mm
- Source: Environment and Climate Change Canada
Imperial conversion
J	F	M	A	M	J	J	A	S	O	N	D
0.6 −7 −21	0.4 0 −17	0.6 13 −9	0.5 33 12	0.6 51 32	1.1 65 48	1.6 71 55	1.7 65 51	1.7 52 40	1.1 35 26	1 16 3	0.6 0 −14
- █ Average max. and min. temperatures in °F
- █ Precipitation totals in inches

Samedan, Graubünden, Switzerland

Climate chart (precipitation, max. and min. temperature)
J	F	M	A	M	J	J	A	S	O	N	D
29 −1 −16	19 1 −16	24 4 −10	37 8 −4	67 13 0	91 17 3	87 19 5	100 19 5	73 15 1	77 11 −3	70 4 −8	37 −1 −13
- █ Average max. and min. temperatures in °C
- █ Precipitation totals in mm
- Source: MeteoSwiss
Imperial conversion
J	F	M	A	M	J	J	A	S	O	N	D
1.1 30 4	0.7 33 4	0.9 39 15	1.5 46 24	2.6 55 32	3.6 63 38	3.4 67 40	3.9 66 40	2.9 58 34	3 51 27	2.8 39 18	1.5 31 8
- █ Average max. and min. temperatures in °F
- █ Precipitation totals in inches

Luleå, Sweden

Climate chart (precipitation, max. and min. temperature)
J	F	M	A	M	J	J	A	S	O	N	D
50 −5 −13	35 −5 −13	30 0 −9	30 5 −3	40 12 3	60 17 9	60 21 12	70 18 11	60 13 6	50 6 0	55 0 −6	50 −3 −10
- █ Average max. and min. temperatures in °C
- █ Precipitation totals in mm
- Source: Climates to Travel
Imperial conversion
J	F	M	A	M	J	J	A	S	O	N	D
2 24 9	1.4 23 8	1.2 32 16	1.2 41 26	1.6 53 37	2.4 63 48	2.4 69 54	2.8 65 52	2.4 56 43	2 42 31	2.2 32 21	2 27 14
- █ Average max. and min. temperatures in °F
- █ Precipitation totals in inches

Nerdal/Mo i Rana, Norway

Climate chart (precipitation, max. and min. temperature)
J	F	M	A	M	J	J	A	S	O	N	D
146 −4 −8	117 −3 −8	112 1 −7	74 6 −2	64 12 3	70 15 7	97 19 10	110 18 9	155 13 6	186 6 1	136 1 −3	163 −2 −5
- █ Average max. and min. temperatures in °C
- █ Precipitation totals in mm
- Source: Weather Online yr.no climate statistics Mo i Rana airport
Imperial conversion
J	F	M	A	M	J	J	A	S	O	N	D
5.7 25 17	4.6 27 19	4.4 34 19	2.9 43 28	2.5 53 37	2.8 60 45	3.8 67 50	4.3 64 49	6.1 55 43	7.3 43 34	5.4 33 28	6.4 29 22
- █ Average max. and min. temperatures in °F
- █ Precipitation totals in inches

Tromsø, Norway

Climate chart (precipitation, max. and min. temperature)
J	F	M	A	M	J	J	A	S	O	N	D
108 −1 −5	97 −1 −6	97 1 −4	71 4 −2	57 9 2	58 13 6	73 16 9	88 15 8	111 11 5	127 5 1	94 2 −2	110 0 −4
- █ Average max. and min. temperatures in °C
- █ Precipitation totals in mm
- Source: Met Norway
Imperial conversion
J	F	M	A	M	J	J	A	S	O	N	D
4.3 30 22	3.8 30 22	3.8 33 24	2.8 39 29	2.2 48 36	2.3 55 43	2.9 61 48	3.5 59 47	4.4 52 42	5 41 34	3.7 36 29	4.3 33 25
- █ Average max. and min. temperatures in °F
- █ Precipitation totals in inches

Kiruna, Sweden

Climate chart (precipitation, max. and min. temperature)
J	F	M	A	M	J	J	A	S	O	N	D
26 −8 −17	20 −7 −16	15 −3 −12	19 3 −6	45 9 1	55 15 6	93 19 9	66 16 7	58 10 3	40 3 −4	26 −3 −10	32 −5 −13
- █ Average max. and min. temperatures in °C
- █ Precipitation totals in mm
- Source: SMHI Open Data for Kiruna flygplats
Imperial conversion
J	F	M	A	M	J	J	A	S	O	N	D
1 18 2	0.8 20 4	0.6 27 11	0.8 38 22	1.8 48 33	2.1 59 42	3.6 65 48	2.6 61 45	2.3 50 37	1.6 37 25	1 27 14	1.2 23 8
- █ Average max. and min. temperatures in °F
- █ Precipitation totals in inches

Yakutsk, Sakha Republic, Russia

Climate chart (precipitation, max. and min. temperature)
J	F	M	A	M	J	J	A	S	O	N	D
10 −34 −40	9 −28 −37	6 −12 −26	8 3 −10	20 14 2	30 23 10	40 26 13	37 22 9	30 12 1	19 −3 −11	17 −22 −30	9 −34 −40
- █ Average max. and min. temperatures in °C
- █ Precipitation totals in mm
- Source: Time and Date
Imperial conversion
J	F	M	A	M	J	J	A	S	O	N	D
0.4 −29 −40	0.4 −18 −35	0.2 11 −15	0.3 37 13	0.8 57 35	1.2 74 50	1.6 78 56	1.5 71 49	1.2 53 34	0.7 27 12	0.7 −8 −21	0.4 −30 −39
- █ Average max. and min. temperatures in °F
- █ Precipitation totals in inches

Verkhoyansk, Sakha Republic, Russia

Climate chart (precipitation, max. and min. temperature)
J	F	M	A	M	J	J	A	S	O	N	D
6 −42 −48	5 −37 −46	5 −19 −37	4 −2 −20	16 10 −2	30 21 7	34 23 10	30 19 6	22 9 −2	13 −9 −18	11 −30 −37	6 −41 −46
- █ Average max. and min. temperatures in °C
- █ Precipitation totals in mm
- Source: Погода и Климат January record
Imperial conversion
J	F	M	A	M	J	J	A	S	O	N	D
0.2 −43 −54	0.2 −34 −51	0.2 −2 −35	0.2 29 −5	0.6 51 28	1.2 69 45	1.3 74 50	1.2 67 42	0.9 48 29	0.5 17 0	0.4 −22 −35	0.2 −41 −51
- █ Average max. and min. temperatures in °F
- █ Precipitation totals in inches

Mohe City, Heilongjiang, China

Climate chart (precipitation, max. and min. temperature)
J	F	M	A	M	J	J	A	S	O	N	D
6.7 −18 −35	4.4 −11 −32	6.2 −2 −22	18 9 −8	44 18 0	60 25 6	117 26 11	99 24 9	52 17 1	28 6 −9	13 −9 −24	8.1 −19 −33
- █ Average max. and min. temperatures in °C
- █ Precipitation totals in mm
- Source: Weather China
Imperial conversion
J	F	M	A	M	J	J	A	S	O	N	D
0.3 0 −31	0.2 12 −26	0.2 29 −8	0.7 48 18	1.7 64 32	2.4 76 44	4.6 79 52	3.9 74 47	2.1 63 33	1.1 42 15	0.5 16 −12	0.3 −2 −28
- █ Average max. and min. temperatures in °F
- █ Precipitation totals in inches

Crater Lake, Oregon, United States

Climate chart (precipitation, max. and min. temperature)
J	F	M	A	M	J	J	A	S	O	N	D
257 1 −7	191 1 −7	198 2 −7	156 5 −5	93 9 −2	58 14 1	20 21 5	21 21 5	49 17 3	122 10 −1	244 3 −5	287 0 −7
- █ Average max. and min. temperatures in °C
- █ Precipitation totals in mm
- Source: NOAA
Imperial conversion
J	F	M	A	M	J	J	A	S	O	N	D
10 33 20	7.5 34 19	7.8 36 20	6.1 40 23	3.7 49 29	2.3 57 34	0.8 69 41	0.8 69 42	1.9 63 37	4.8 51 30	9.6 38 23	11 33 19
- █ Average max. and min. temperatures in °F
- █ Precipitation totals in inches

Norilsk, Krasnoyarsk Krai, Russia

Climate chart (precipitation, max. and min. temperature)
J	F	M	A	M	J	J	A	S	O	N	D
18 −24 −31	16 −23 −31	28 −18 −26	21 −10 −19	24 −2 −8	34 10 3	32 18 10	52 15 8	26 7 1	36 −7 −13	31 −17 −24	22 −22 −29
- █ Average max. and min. temperatures in °C
- █ Precipitation totals in mm
- Source: Weatherbase
Imperial conversion
J	F	M	A	M	J	J	A	S	O	N	D
0.7 −10 −23	0.6 −9 −24	1.1 −1 −16	0.8 14 −1	0.9 29 17	1.4 51 38	1.3 65 50	2.1 59 46	1 44 34	1.4 20 10	1.2 2 −11	0.9 −7 −20
- █ Average max. and min. temperatures in °F
- █ Precipitation totals in inches

Östersund, Sweden

Climate chart (precipitation, max. and min. temperature)
J	F	M	A	M	J	J	A	S	O	N	D
32 −3 −9	21 −2 −8	22 1 −6	23 7 −1	48 13 4	62 17 8	76 20 11	81 18 10	55 13 7	44 6 2	34 1 −3	36 −1 −6
- █ Average max. and min. temperatures in °C
- █ Precipitation totals in mm
- Source: SMHI
Imperial conversion
J	F	M	A	M	J	J	A	S	O	N	D
1.3 27 16	0.8 28 17	0.9 35 22	0.9 45 31	1.9 55 39	2.5 62 47	3 67 52	3.2 64 51	2.2 55 44	1.7 43 35	1.3 34 26	1.4 30 21
- █ Average max. and min. temperatures in °F
- █ Precipitation totals in inches

Oulu, Finland

Climate chart (precipitation, max. and min. temperature)
J	F	M	A	M	J	J	A	S	O	N	D
32 −5 −12	29 −5 −12	26 0 −8	23 6 −3	40 13 3	51 18 9	80 21 12	62 19 11	49 13 6	51 6 1	43 1 −4	39 −3 −9
- █ Average max. and min. temperatures in °C
- █ Precipitation totals in mm
- Source: FMI
Imperial conversion
J	F	M	A	M	J	J	A	S	O	N	D
1.3 23 11	1.1 24 10	1 31 17	0.9 42 28	1.6 55 38	2 64 49	3.1 70 54	2.4 66 51	1.9 56 43	2 42 33	1.7 33 24	1.5 27 16
- █ Average max. and min. temperatures in °F
- █ Precipitation totals in inches

Kangerlussuaq, Greenland, Denmark

Climate chart (precipitation, max. and min. temperature)
J	F	M	A	M	J	J	A	S	O	N	D
7.9 −13 −23	6.1 −15 −25	5.2 −11 −22	7.6 −1 −12	11 8 −2	13 15 4	28 17 5	32 14 3	23 8 −1	13 −1 −9	12 −7 −16	9.8 −11 −20
- █ Average max. and min. temperatures in °C
- █ Precipitation totals in mm
- Source: Danish Meteorological Institute
Imperial conversion
J	F	M	A	M	J	J	A	S	O	N	D
0.3 8 −10	0.2 5 −13	0.2 13 −8	0.3 30 11	0.4 47 29	0.5 60 40	1.1 62 41	1.2 57 38	0.9 46 30	0.5 31 16	0.5 19 4	0.4 13 −4
- █ Average max. and min. temperatures in °F
- █ Precipitation totals in inches

Anadyr, Chukotka, Russia

Climate chart (precipitation, max. and min. temperature)
J	F	M	A	M	J	J	A	S	O	N	D
40 −19 −26	44 −17 −25	38 −15 −22	23 −8 −16	13 2 −4	16 12 4	36 16 9	45 14 8	32 8 3	29 −1 −6	36 −8 −15	33 −16 −23
- █ Average max. and min. temperatures in °C
- █ Precipitation totals in mm
- Source: Погода и климат
Imperial conversion
J	F	M	A	M	J	J	A	S	O	N	D
1.6 −1 −14	1.7 1 −12	1.5 6 −7	0.9 17 4	0.5 36 25	0.6 53 39	1.4 61 48	1.8 57 46	1.3 47 37	1.1 30 21	1.4 17 6	1.3 4 −9
- █ Average max. and min. temperatures in °F
- █ Precipitation totals in inches

Livigno, Italy

Climate chart (precipitation, max. and min. temperature)
J	F	M	A	M	J	J	A	S	O	N	D
107 −6 −14	123 −5 −14	134 −2 −10	205 2 −4	248 7 1	271 12 6	275 15 8	129 15 7	178 10 3	125 4 −3	171 −1 −8	121 −5 −12
- █ Average max. and min. temperatures in °C
- █ Precipitation totals in mm
- Source: World Weather Online
Imperial conversion
J	F	M	A	M	J	J	A	S	O	N	D
4.2 21 7	4.8 23 7	5.3 29 15	8.1 35 25	9.8 44 34	11 54 43	11 59 46	5.1 59 45	7 50 37	4.9 40 27	6.7 30 18	4.8 23 10
- █ Average max. and min. temperatures in °F
- █ Precipitation totals in inches

Fraser, Colorado, United States

Climate chart (precipitation, max. and min. temperature)
J	F	M	A	M	J	J	A	S	O	N	D
49 −1 −18	36 1 −17	45 6 −12	52 11 −7	32 17 −3	30 22 0	48 25 3	44 24 3	41 20 −2	41 13 −6	35 5 −13	43 −1 −18
- █ Average max. and min. temperatures in °C
- █ Precipitation totals in mm
- Source: NOAA
Imperial conversion
J	F	M	A	M	J	J	A	S	O	N	D
1.9 31 −1	1.4 34 2	1.8 43 11	2 51 20	1.3 62 27	1.2 72 33	1.9 77 38	1.7 74 37	1.6 68 29	1.6 56 21	1.4 41 10	1.7 31 −1
- █ Average max. and min. temperatures in °F
- █ Precipitation totals in inches

Tsetserleg, Mongolia

Climate chart (precipitation, max. and min. temperature)
J	F	M	A	M	J	J	A	S	O	N	D
2.9 −8 −21	3.4 −5 −18	8.2 2 −11	35 11 −3	35 17 3	55 21 8	88 23 11	73 21 9	27 17 3	13 9 −5	6.4 −1 −13	3.2 −6 −18
- █ Average max. and min. temperatures in °C
- █ Precipitation totals in mm
- Source: NOAA Starlings Roost Weather
Imperial conversion
J	F	M	A	M	J	J	A	S	O	N	D
0.1 17 −5	0.1 23 0	0.3 36 12	1.4 51 27	1.4 63 37	2.2 71 46	3.4 74 51	2.9 71 47	1.1 62 37	0.5 48 23	0.3 31 9	0.1 20 0
- █ Average max. and min. temperatures in °F
- █ Precipitation totals in inches

Valle Nevado, Chile

Climate chart (precipitation, max. and min. temperature)
J	F	M	A	M	J	J	A	S	O	N	D
53 16 7	49 16 7	37 14 6	65 10 1	114 4 −4	162 0 −7	121 −1 −7	114 0 −6	103 2 −6	87 5 −4	76 8 −1	61 12 3
- █ Average max. and min. temperatures in °C
- █ Precipitation totals in mm
- Source: Climate-Data.org
Imperial conversion
J	F	M	A	M	J	J	A	S	O	N	D
2.1 60 45	1.9 60 45	1.5 58 42	2.6 50 35	4.5 39 25	6.4 31 20	4.8 29 19	4.5 32 21	4.1 36 22	3.4 41 26	3 46 30	2.4 54 38
- █ Average max. and min. temperatures in °F
- █ Precipitation totals in inches

== See also ==
- Boreal ecology
- Köppen climate classification
- Subantarctic
- Taiga
