= Central Afghan highlands =

Region of Afghanistan

Central Afghan Highlands افغانستان کوهستانی (Dari) غرنی افغانستان (Pashto)
- Region
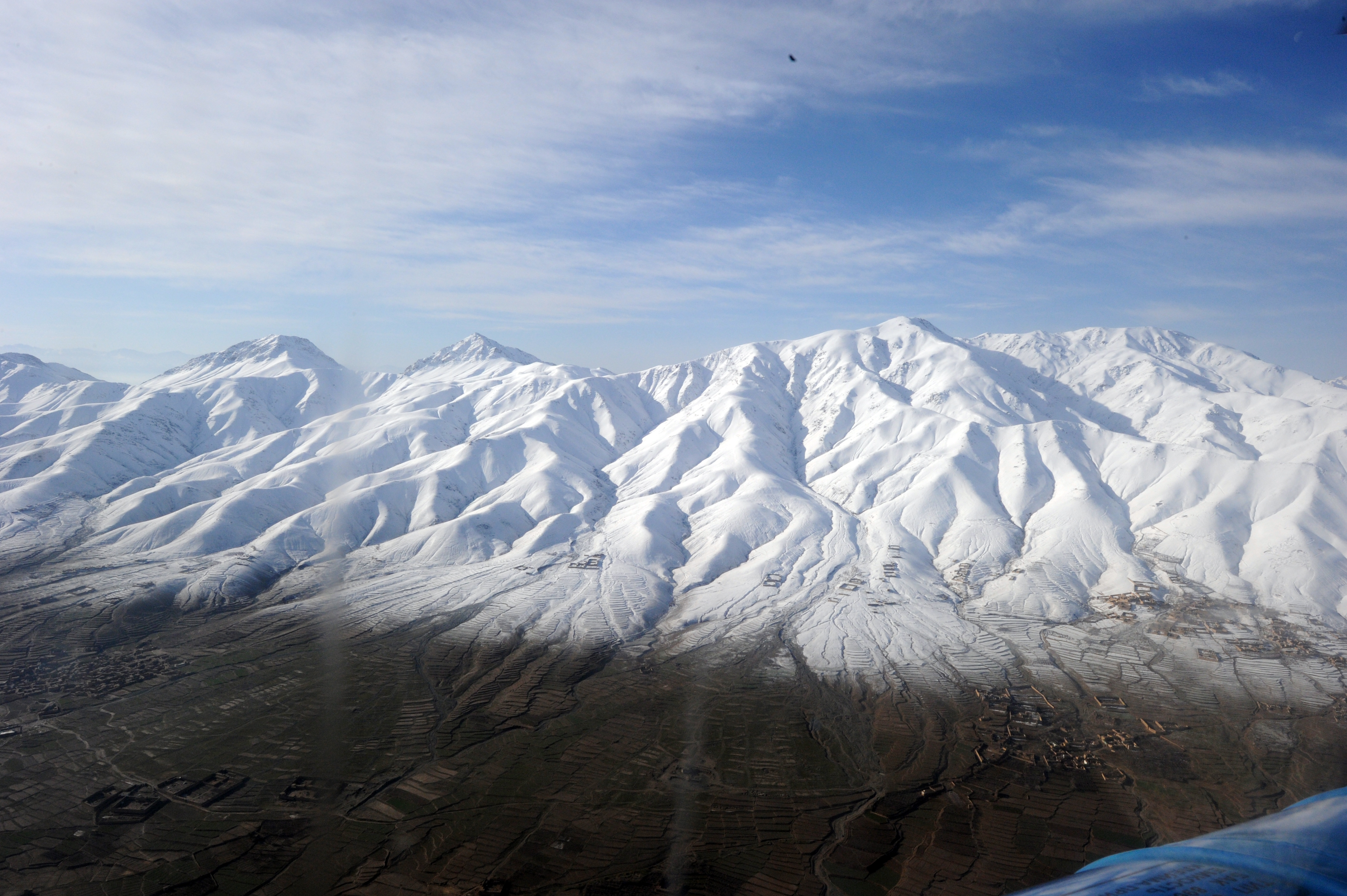
- Snow-covered mountains in Ghazni
- Interactive map of Central Afghan Highlands
- Coordinates: 35°N 68°E
- Country: Afghanistan

Area
  - Total: 414,000 km^{2} (160,000 sq mi)

Dimensions
  - Length: 1,000 km (620 mi)
- Highest elevation: 7,708 m (25,289 ft)
- Lowest elevation: 1,500 m (4,900 ft)
- Time zone: UTC+4:30

The central Afghan highlands, or the Afghan Highlands (Dari/Persian: افغانستان کوهستانی; Pashto: غرنی افغانستان), is a geographic region of Afghanistan. Stretching from the Sabzak Pass near Herat in the west to the Little Pamir in the northeast, it includes the main Hindu Kush range and forms a western extension of the Himalayas. It is a highland area of more than 1,500 m (4,900 ft) above sea level, mostly situated between 2,000 and 3,000 m (6,500 and 9,800 ft), with some peaks rising above 6,400 m (21,000 ft). Usually, the valley bottoms in the area are used for cereal and horticultural production, and the mountains and high plateaus are used as pasture in summer for grazing sheep, goats, cattle, and camels. Its total area is about 414,000 km^{2} (160,000 sq mi).

The region contains about 225,000 km^{2} (87,000 sq mi) of summer pasture, which is used by both settled communities and nomadic pastoralists like the Kuchis. Major pastures in the region include the Nawur pasture in northern Ghazni Province (whose area is about 600 km^{2} at elevation of up to 3,350 m), and the Shewa pasture and the Little Pamir in eastern Badakhshan Province. The Little Pamir pasture, whose elevation is above 4,000 m (13,000 ft), is used by the Afghan Kyrgyz to raise livestock.

The region includes Bamyan, Ghazni, Ghor, Logar, Nuristan, Paktia, Paktika, Panjshir, Parwan, and Maidan Wardak provinces, most of Badakhshan, Daykundi, Kabul, and Zabul, and adjacent parts of some neighboring provinces. It is inhabited by the Hazaras, Kyrgyz, Pashtuns, Tajiks, Uzbeks, Wakhis, and other tribes.

== History ==
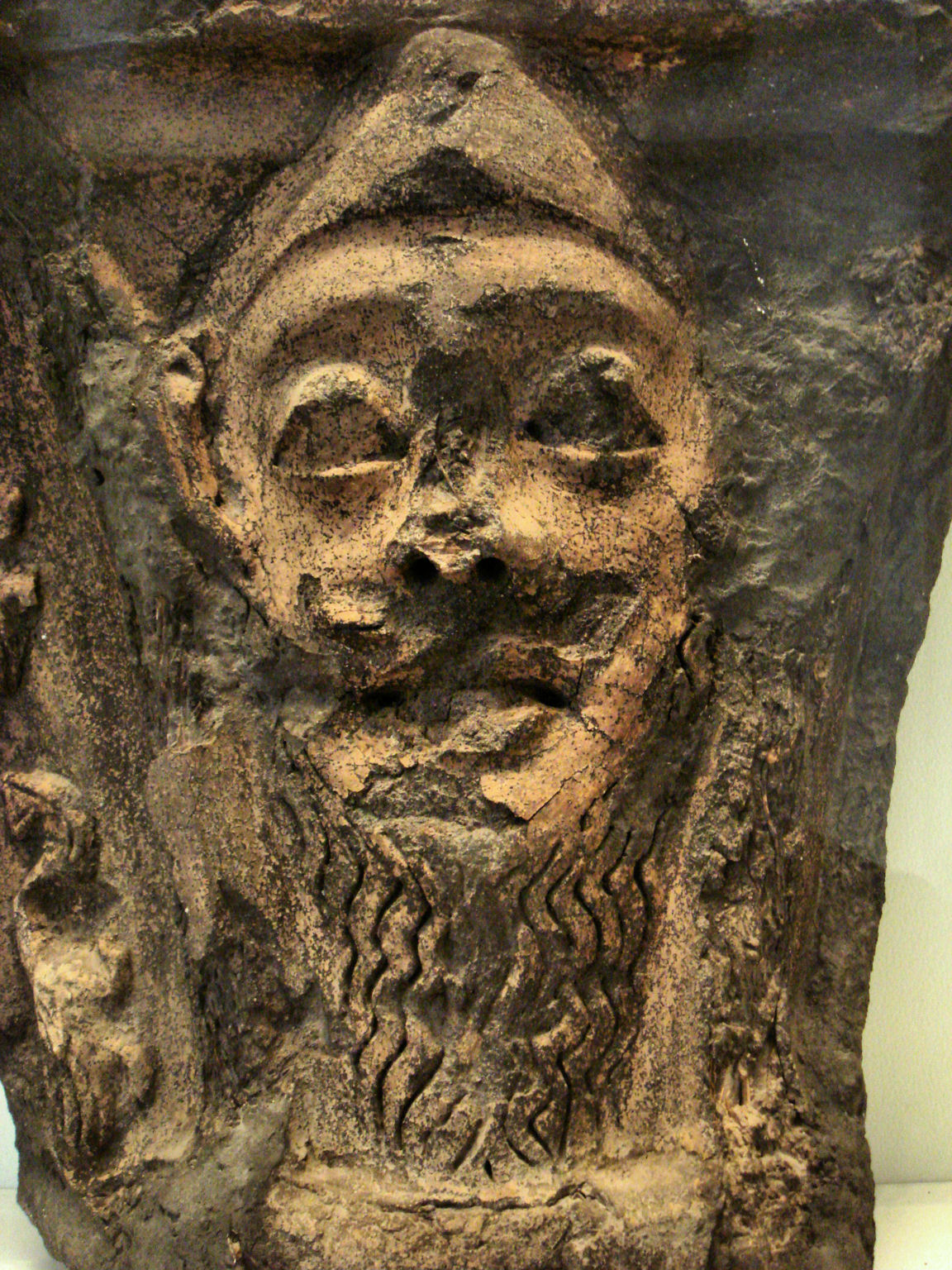
Statue of a bearded man with cap, probably Scythian, Bamyan c. 3–4th century

The Highlands were a part of the wider region inhabited by Indo-Iranian tribes in ancient times, who called themselves Arya or Ārya. According to the scholar Michael Witzel, Airyanem Vaejah, i.e. "(the country) of the Aryan Springs" or "Aryan Rapids", which was mentioned in the Vendidad list in the Avesta as the first and best of the "16 Aryan countries" created by Ahura Mazda, was in the central Afghan highlands. Witzel stated that the Vendidad list "obviously was composed or redacted by someone who regarded Afghanistan and the lands surrounding it as the home of all Aryans (Airiia), that is of all (eastern) Iranians, with Airyanem Vaejah as their center."

He added that Airyanem Vaejah "is also centrally located in terms of Avestan economy: all Airiia could use it during the two months of summer as pasture, just as the modern Afghans still do. The Highlands are, typical for early societies, not exactly a no man's land, but are a common territory, used, with partially overlapping pasture rights, by all Airiia."

== Geography ==
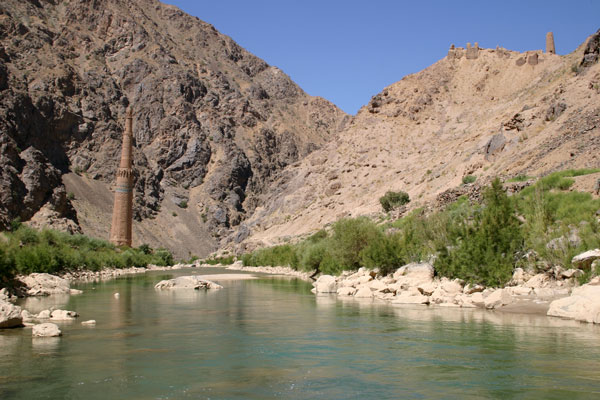
The Hari River near the Minaret of Jam, Firozkoh

The Highlands are cut through by the rivers of Afghanistan, including the Kabul, Helmand, Farah, Hari, Marghab, and Panj rivers. At the Shibar Pass, the Koh-i-Baba branches out from the Hindu Kush. The region has mountain pastures during summer (sardsīr), watered by the many small streams and rivers. There are also pastures available during winter in the neighboring warm lowlands (garmsīr), which makes the region ideal for seasonal transhumance. Forests exist between Nuristan and Paktika in the East Afghan montane conifer forests, and tundra exists in the northeast. An arc of the mountains extends up to Quetta, Ziarat, and Kalat in Balochistan in the south, which are home to large juniper forests.

There are about 4,000 glaciers with an overall area of about 2,700 km^{2}, mostly located between 4,000 and 5,000 m above sea level. Most of the glaciers occur in the east, mostly on north-facing slopes which are shaded by mountain peaks, or on the eastern slopes which are shaded by monsoon clouds. The glaciers are a major source of water for drinking and irrigation. However, they are now showing signs of shrinking and retreating due to climate change.

The Badashkhan area in the northeastern part of the Highlands is the epicenter of many of the earthquakes in Afghanistan.

=== Climate ===
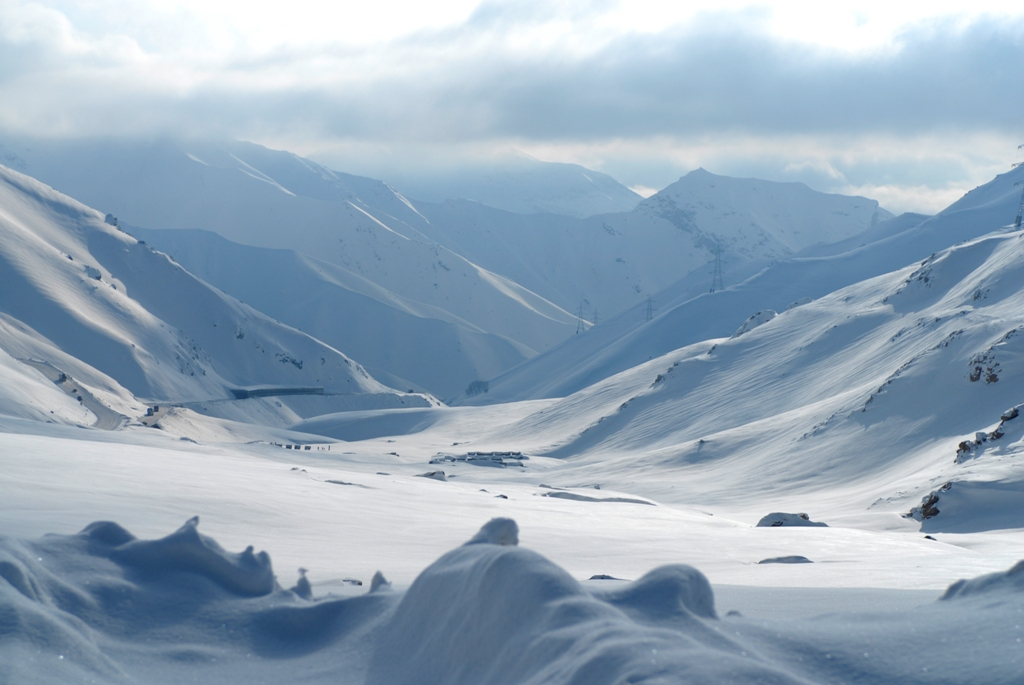
The Salang Pass during winter

The Highlands have a very cold winter and the temperature in January can reach below −30 °C (−22 °F). In winter and early spring, the weather is significantly influenced by cold air masses from the north and northwest. Snow generally falls from November to March or April, with occasional snowfalls as early as October. On the southern slopes of the Hindu Kush exceeding 4,000 m, it can snow at anytime of the year including in high summer. The permanent snow line in the region ranges from 4,600 to 5,600 m, although glaciers and firns can also be found as low as 3,500 m. The summer is short and cool in the Highlands, and is mostly cloudless everywhere but in the eastern monsoon region.

The precipitation varies considerably with topography, generally decreasing from the east to the arid west. For example, the annual mean precipitation is 992 mm (39 inches) at North Salang in the east, but only 133 mm (5 inches) at Bamyan in the west.

Climate data for Panjab, Afghanistan (altitude: 2,710 m)
Month	Jan	Feb	Mar	Apr	May	Jun	Jul	Aug	Sep	Oct	Nov	Dec	Year
Mean daily maximum °C (°F)	−10.4 (13.3)	−9.4 (15.1)	−3.4 (25.9)	4.1 (39.4)	14.6 (58.3)	19.7 (67.5)	22.9 (73.2)	22.4 (72.3)	18.7 (65.7)	12.1 (53.8)	1.1 (34.0)	−7.5 (18.5)	7.1 (44.8)
Daily mean °C (°F)	−15.3 (4.5)	−13.7 (7.3)	−8.2 (17.2)	−1.3 (29.7)	7.0 (44.6)	11.5 (52.7)	14.4 (57.9)	14.1 (57.4)	10.6 (51.1)	5.1 (41.2)	−4.8 (23.4)	−13.2 (8.2)	0.5 (32.9)
Mean daily minimum °C (°F)	−20.1 (−4.2)	−18 (0)	−12.9 (8.8)	−6.7 (19.9)	−0.7 (30.7)	3.2 (37.8)	5.9 (42.6)	5.8 (42.4)	2.5 (36.5)	−1.9 (28.6)	−10.7 (12.7)	−18.8 (−1.8)	−6.0 (21.2)
Average precipitation mm (inches)	53 (2.1)	71 (2.8)	75 (3.0)	56 (2.2)	41 (1.6)	11 (0.4)	3 (0.1)	2 (0.1)	2 (0.1)	13 (0.5)	30 (1.2)	37 (1.5)	394 (15.6)
Source: Climate-Data.org
