= Dasht-e Nawar =

- Interactive map of Dasht-e Nawar
- 33°41′N 67°43′E
- Type: Palaeolithic site
- Location: Ghazni province, Afghanistan

Site notes
- Excavation dates: 1976 survey by Dupree & Davis

Dasht-e Nāwar (Persian: دشت ناور) is an archaeological site in Ghazni province in Afghanistan. It's situated at the northern end of the lake, on and around Tepe Qādagak, c. 60 km west of Ghazni. A brackish lake measuring c. 60 x 15 km. On the "beaches" to the east and north are several palaeolithic sites: Lower Palaeolithic on the east and Middle Palaeolithic on the north, which includes a large stone hill fortification and associated structures of uncertain date. The surface sites are covered in stone tools, 98% of which are obsidian. These include cleavers, large scrappers, choppers and microblades, some of which appear Lower Palaeolithic. The others bear similarities to the Darra-i Kūr industry.

Collection:

- BIAS – stone tools.

Field-work:

- 1976 Dupree & Davis – survey.
