= 2022 Taliban dissension =

Taliban inner conflict between Pashtun and non-Pashtun members

- Part of Afghanistan conflict (1978–present), Republican insurgency in Afghanistan
Date	Maymana: 13 January 2022 – 17 January 2022 (4 days); Qadis District: 14 January 2022 – 18 January 2022 (4 days); Ab Kamari District: 14 January 2022 – 14 February 2022 (1 month)
Location	Maymana, Faryab Province, Afghanistan; Badghis Province, Afghanistan
Result	Maymana: Taliban victory: Revolt suppressed; Ab Kamari & Qadis districts: Unclear: Ethnic Tajik rebels take over Ab Kamari & Qadis districts; Taliban by February retake both the districts.

Belligerents
Islamic Emirate of Afghanistan	Maymana: Uzbek Taliban Ab Kamari & Qadis districts: Tajik Taliban

Commanders and leaders
Hibatullah Akhundzada	Maymana: unknown Ab Kamari & Qadis districts: Noor Agha; Saleh Mohammad Pardel

Strength
unknown	unknown

Casualties and losses
unknown	unknown

The 2022 Taliban dissension began in January 2022, the Taliban arrested 2 of its commanders, Makhdoom Alem, an ethnic Uzbek, and Qari Wakil, an ethnic Tajik. The arrests led to clashes between Pashtun and non-Pashtun Taliban.

== Background ==
When the Taliban rose to power in 1996, initially it enjoyed enormous good will from Afghans weary of the corruption, brutality, and the incessant fighting of Mujahideen warlords. However, reactions and resistance would vary and increase among non-Pashtun people. The Taliban considered many of Afghanistan's other ethnic groups as foreigners, as Pashtuns comprised the vast majority of the Taliban. As the Taliban expanded from their southern and south-eastern strongholds, they encountered more resistance as their brand of Deobandi Islam incorporated with the Pashtunwali tribal code was viewed as foreign and oppressive by the other ethnic groups of Afghanistan, and the Battles of Mazar-i-Sharif from 1997 to 1998 illustrated this ethnic tension. However, during the course of the Taliban insurgency, the Taliban attempted to gain support from other ethnicities, and they recruited Tajiks, Uzbeks, and Hazaras into their ranks, although many, most notably Mehdi Mujahid, later left and said that the Taliban was only using them to grow their influence.

== Clashes ==
In Maymana, Uzbek Taliban units revolted and forcibly disarmed local Pashtun Taliban units and briefly seizing control of Maymana on January 13. The local Taliban leadership, including the governor and police chief, fled the city. The revolt happened shortly after the Taliban Deputy Defense Minister Mullah Fazel Mazloom arrested Makhdoom Alem, a senior Uzbek Taliban commander in Mazar-i-Sharif on January 12. The Taliban central leadership responded quickly to the revolt in Maymana, deploying additional reinforcements on the 14–16 January ending the revolt with Makdoom Alem remaining in Taliban custody. On January 14 the Taliban also arrested Qari Wakil, a senior Tajik Taliban commander, in Mazar-i-Sharif after he traveled there to negotiate the release of Makhdoom Alem. The arrest of Qari Wakil eventually resulted in two Tajik Taliban commanders in Badghis province, Noor Agha in Ab Kamari District and Saleh Mohammad Pardel in Qadis District revolting and saying they would no longer obey the Taliban provincial leadership in Badghis province and soon their forces would capture the districts of Ab Kamari & Qadis. However 4 days later, an article published by the BBC indicated Qadis District was in Taliban control, and a month later in February an article by Rahapress indicated the same in Ab Kamari District.
