= Bala Murghab District =

Bala Murghab
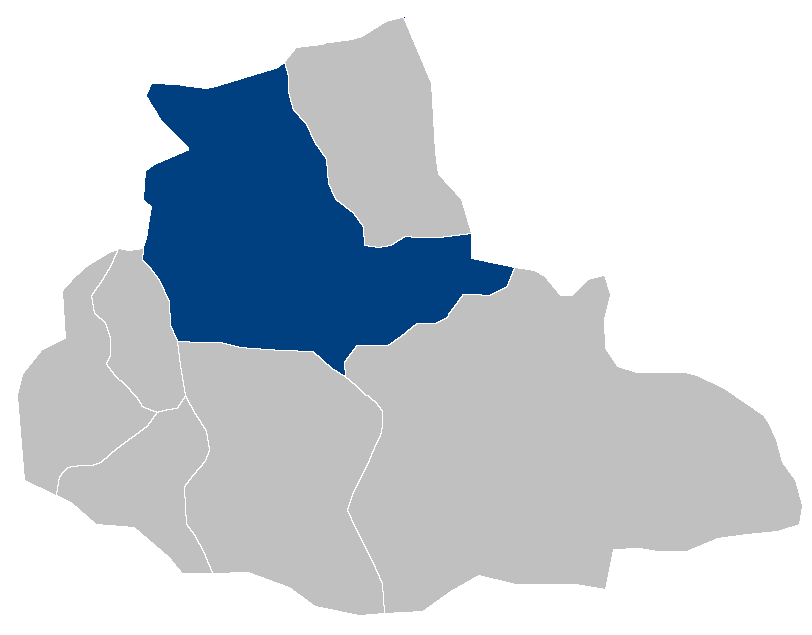

- Location in Afghanistan
- Coordinates: 35°34′N 63°20′E
- Country: Afghanistan
- Province: Badghis

Area
  - Land: 4,491 km^{2} (1,734 sq mi)

Population
  - Estimate (2003): 109,381

Bala Murghab (Pashto: بالامرغاب) is a district situated in the northeast of Badghis Province, Afghanistan. The district capital is Bala Murghab city which is located along the Murghab River. Bala Murghab is surrounded by some other important districts such as Ab Kamari, Muqur, Jawand, and Qadis.

== Demographics ==
The estimated population of Murghab District in 2003 was roughly 109,381. Based upon the United Nations High Commissioner for Refugees (UNHCR) report, Pashtuns make up 95.0% of the total population, followed by Aimaqs, Turkmen and Uzbeks.

== Geography ==
Murghab is a hilly district located in the northeast of Badghis Province. Most of the population live in the valley of the Murghab River.

The district has 133 villages which covers an area of 4,491 km^{2}. Murghab is surrounded by Turkmenistan, Muqur, Qadis, Jawand, Ghormach and Qaysar district of neighbouring Faryab Province.

== Education ==
There are around 2 high schools, 3 secondary schools and 24 primary schools in the district.

== History ==
During the Afghan Civil War the district was first besieged and then captured by the Taliban in May 2019 after the Afghan Armed Forces/Afghan National Police retreated from most strategic sites in the district center with the exception of a military base nearby, a base that they still hold today despite Taliban pressure. Nonetheless, Afghan Security Forces are still able to launch raids on the area via Helicopter with United States military support; in January 2020, both US and Afghan forces conducted a special operation in the district center liberating more than 60 prisoners from a Taliban prison.
