= Senjetak =

Senjetak (Persian: بهلكه) may refer to:

- Senjetak, Afghanistan
- Senjetak, Bajestan, in Razavi Khorasan Province, Iran
- Senjetak, Gonabad, in Razavi Khorasan Province, Iran

== See also ==
- Senjedak (disambiguation)
