= Senjedak =

Senjedak or Senjedk (Persian: سنجدك) may refer to:

- Senjedak, Markazi
- Senjedak, Fariman, Razavi Khorasan Province
- Senjedak, Kashmar, Razavi Khorasan Province
- Senjedak, Sistan and Baluchestan
- Senjedak, Behabad, Yazd Province

== See also ==
- Senjetak (disambiguation)
