= Senjetak, Afghanistan =

Senjetak سنجیتک
- Village
- Location in Afghanistan
- Coordinates: 34.9857°N 63.2357°E
- Country: Afghanistan
- Province: Badghis Province
- District: Muqur District

Senjetak (Persian: سنجیتک) is a village in Badghis Province, Afghanistan, located near Qala i Naw City, but officially under the administrative jurisdiction of the Muqur District.

== Village life ==
Senjetak's inhabitants are farmers who keep flocks of sheep and herds of cows. The village has a spring called Seyah Kolab (سیه کلاب) ("Dark Spring"), which provides sufficient water to irrigate the surrounding fields and farms. Scenic mountains enclose the village on two sides while a road runs between these mountain ranges.

Village children are interested in their education and the government has built two schools, one for boys and the other for girls. In addition to government assistance, Non-governmental organizations (NGOs) and other foreign organizations such as World Vision have contributed to local agricultural and recreational facilities. Every evening and especially on Fridays, many people come from the nearby city to relax and enjoy the fresh air of the village while it is also a popular spot for visitors from overseas to have picnics. Works carried out by the people of the village in conjunction with NGOs include a large garden with different kinds of fruit located in Chap Ghul (چپ غول) ("left hole or valley") and a mountain-based pistachio orchard on the property of local villager Moula Bick (مولابیک ), who intends to carry out many other useful projects to improve the welfare and interests of the people of Badghis.
