= Bowkan =

Bowkan may refer to:

- Bala Bowkan, a village in Afghanistan
- Pa'in Bowkan, a village in Afghanistan
