= Ab Bakhsh =

- Location in Afghanistan
- Coordinates: 34°52′N 63°16′E
- Country: Afghanistan
- Province: Badghis Province
- District: Qadis District
- Time zone: + 4.30

Ab Bakhsh is a village in Badghis Province in north-western Afghanistan. It is located in Qadis District.
