= Bala Murghab =

Bala Murghab بالامرغاب
- City
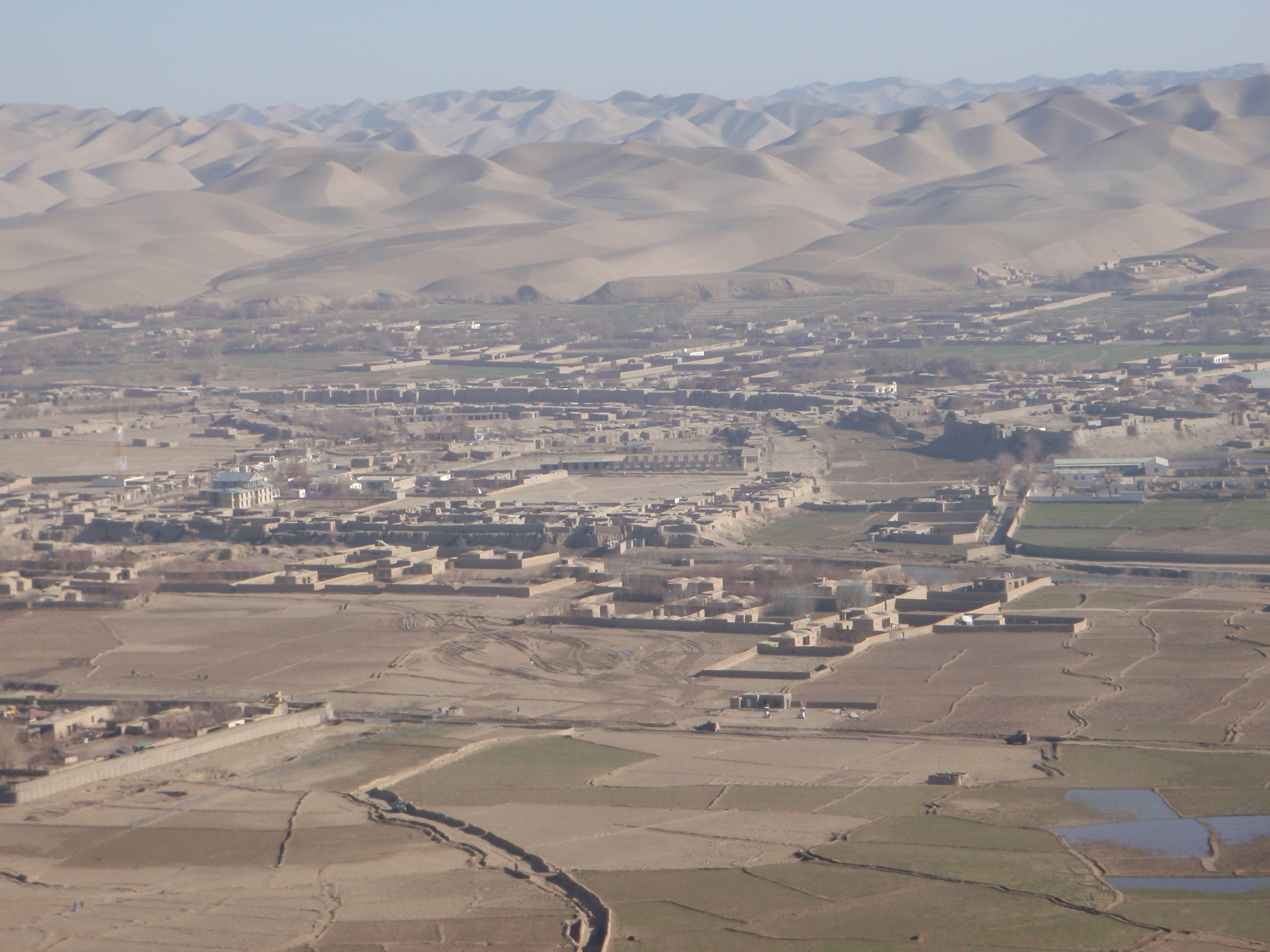

- Location in Afghanistan
- Coordinates: 35°34′49″N 63°19′40″E
- Country: Afghanistan
- Province: Badghis
- District: Bala Murghab

Government
  - Type: Tribal
  - Mayor: Muhammad Lewal
- Elevation: 1,555 ft (474 m)
- Time zone: + 4.30

Bala Murghab (Pashto (Note: Pashto pronunciation: [bɑˌlɑ‿mʊɾˈɣɑb]) and Dari: (Note: Dari pronunciation: [bɑːˌlɑː‿mʊɾˈɣɑːb]) بالامرغاب; lit. 'Upper Murghab') is a city in Badghis Province, Afghanistan, located on the Murghab River. It is the district center for the Bala Murghab District. Bala Murghab is the largest city of Badghis Province, while Bala Murghab District, with a population of 109,381, is also the most populous district of the province. Close to Bala Murghab lies the ruins of the medieval city Marw al-Rudh, the historical capital of the medieval region of Gharjistan. Throughout the War in Afghanistan, it was heavily contested by the Taliban and Afghan National Security Forces. The city was captured by the Taliban during the 2021 Taliban offensive.

== History ==
Marw al-Rudh was a major medieval city in the Gharjistan region at the location of the modern city of Bala Murghab. The Abbasid-era geographers report that Marw al-Rudh was the center of a flourishing agricultural region in Khorasan, at the site where the Murghab River leaves the mountains and enters the steppe of the Karakum Desert. A section of the Harbiyya district of the Round city of Baghdad was named Marwrūdiyya (مرورودية) after the city of Marw al-Rudh. Although the town appears to have escaped the destruction of Marw al-Shahijan (modern Mary, Turkmenistan) by the Mongols, it fell into ruins under the Timurids and was largely abandoned.

== Climate ==
With a warm and temperate climate, Bala Murghab features a hot-summer Mediterranean climate (Csa) under the Köppen climate classification. The average temperature in Bala Murghab is 16.1 °C, while the annual precipitation averages 326 mm.

July is the hottest month of the year with an average temperature of 28.6 °C. The coldest month January has an average temperature of 3.6 °C.

Climate data for Bala Murghab
Month	Jan	Feb	Mar	Apr	May	Jun	Jul	Aug	Sep	Oct	Nov	Dec	Year
Mean daily maximum °C (°F)	8.7 (47.7)	9.7 (49.5)	16.2 (61.2)	22.7 (72.9)	29.5 (85.1)	35.3 (95.5)	37.2 (99.0)	35.4 (95.7)	30.8 (87.4)	24.4 (75.9)	17.5 (63.5)	11.5 (52.7)	23.2 (73.8)
Daily mean °C (°F)	3.6 (38.5)	5.0 (41.0)	10.6 (51.1)	16.3 (61.3)	21.4 (70.5)	26.4 (79.5)	28.6 (83.5)	26.8 (80.2)	21.8 (71.2)	16.0 (60.8)	10.5 (50.9)	6.0 (42.8)	16.1 (60.9)
Mean daily minimum °C (°F)	−1.4 (29.5)	0.3 (32.5)	5.0 (41.0)	9.9 (49.8)	13.3 (55.9)	17.5 (63.5)	20.1 (68.2)	18.3 (64.9)	12.8 (55.0)	7.7 (45.9)	3.6 (38.5)	0.6 (33.1)	9.0 (48.2)
Source: Climate-Data.org

== See also ==
- List of cities in Afghanistan

== Sources ==
- Bosworth, C. E. (1991). "Marw al- Rūd̲h̲". In Bosworth, C. E.; van Donzel, E. & Pellat, Ch. (eds.). The Encyclopaedia of Islam, Second Edition. Volume VI: Mahk–Mid. Leiden: E. J. Brill. pp. 617–618. doi:10.1163/1573-3912_islam_SIM_4977. ISBN 978-90-04-08112-3.
- Wallace, Kevin (2013). "To hell and back: The Bala Murghab saga" (First ed.). Idaho: U.S. Air Force.
- Golembesky, Michael (2014). Level zero heroes: the story of U.S. Marine Special Operations in Bala Murghab, Afghanistan (First ed.). New York: St. Martin's Press. ISBN 9781250030405.
