= Qadis District =

Coordinates: 34°52′53″N 63°29′03″E

Qadis قادیس
- district
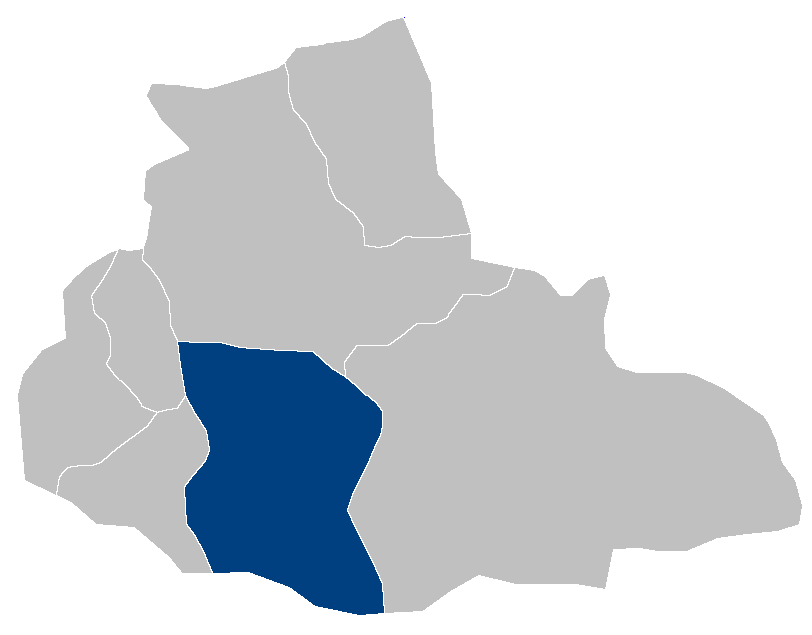
- Qadis District within Badghis Province
- Country: Afghanistan
- Province: Badghis

Area
  - Land: 3,385 km^{2} (1,307 sq mi)

The Qadis District (Pashto: قادیس Dari: قادیس) is located in the southern part of Badghis province, Afghanistan, between the districts Jawand in the east, Qala i Naw in the west, Muqur and Bala Murghab in the north. In the south is the Herat province. The capital is Qadis.

The Firozkhoi tribe of the Aimaq people once occupied the area.

Qadis was also the epicentre of the 2022 Afghanistan earthquake, which killed 28 people.
