= Sabzak Pass =

Mountain pass in northeastern Afghanistan

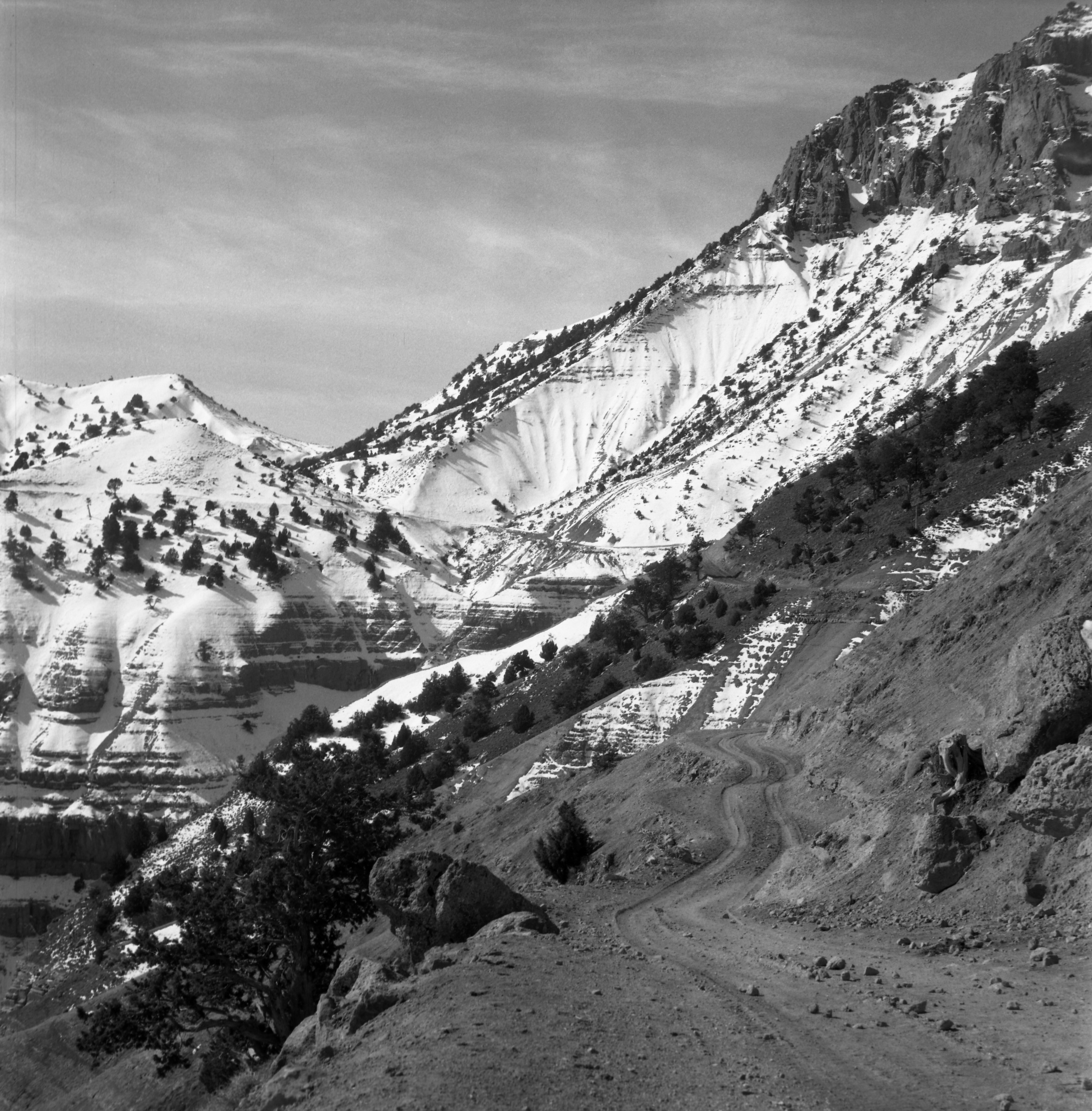
- Sabzak pass, Hindu Kush, Afghanistan
- Interactive map of Sabzak Pass
- Elevation: 2,517 m (8,258 ft)

Third Approach
- Location: Sabzak, Afghanistan
- Coordinates: 34°38′16″N 63°06′56″E

Sabzak Pass is a mountain pass in Afghanistan. It is located in the Paropamisus Mountains, north of Herat and south of Badghis of Paropamisu. It has an altitude of 2517 metres from sea level.

The Ring Road highway, which connects Herat and Qal'eh-ye Now, travels through Sabzak Pass. The road between the two cities, called "Lapis route", is 157 kilometres long. The road is in poor condition and is unpaved for most of the route. The route crosses the pass as a winding dirt road next to a gorge.

The Islamic Republic of Afghanistan maintained and paved the road over the pass, and about 1,200 Afghan soldiers maintained it and protected it from the Taliban. When that government collapsed, this protection ended. Najibullah Bastani maintains an inn in the pass, the Sayed Abad Hotel, which serves as a lifeline for travelers.

== See also ==
- Battle of Sabzak
