= Battle of Sabzak =

Battle in north Afghanistan in September 2009

Coordinates: 34°38′16″N 63°06′56″E

- Part of War in Afghanistan
Date	3–4 September 2009
Location	Sabzak Pass, Badghis Province
Result	Coalition victory

Belligerents
ISAF Spain Italy	Taliban; Tajik tribals

Commanders and leaders
(Spain) José Enrique Serantes	(Afghanistan) Jamuladdin Mansoor; Ishan Khan

Casualties and losses
2 wounded 2 vehicles damaged	13 killed 3 wounded

The Battle of Sabzak was an engagement between Spanish and Italian forces of NATO's International Security Assistance Force (ISAF) and Taliban insurgents supported by militant Tajik tribals. The action took place from 3 to 4 September 2009 on Sabzak pass, in the province of Badghis, during the War in Afghanistan.

NATO sent Spanish troops to place a patrol on the pass, the only road supplying Qal'eh-ye and Herat after numerous attacks on military convoys throughout the summer and after the collapse of the Taliban's control on the area. Taliban mullah Jamuladdin Mansoor, allied with Tajik tribals on both sides of the road tried to prevent passage with the help of Tajik warlord Ishan Khan.

The Spanish forces took control of the road on Monday 31 July. The insurgents, after reorganizing themselves, ambushed the ISAF detachment on 3 September, resulting in two Spanish soldiers injured.

The next day, a convoy of 30 vehicles and 100 Spaniard soldiers oversaw the meeting between another convoy and the Afghan police for protection, but it was ambushed from four points in a planned operation. The troops returned fire, calling in aerial support. Two Italian Mangusta helicopters were brought in and opened fire on Taliban positions, but aerial bombardment by fixed wing aircraft was ruled out due to the proximity of a civilian settlement. After six hours of fighting, the Taliban and their allies withdrew to the village of Marghozar.

Sergeant José Enrique Serrano, commander of the Spanish company that defended the pass on 3 September, and a soldier who received a minor scratch on his face form a ricocheting bullet, were the only ISAF members wounded in the battle, while two vehicles were rendered unusable. 13 insurgents were eventually killed, and 3 were injured.
