= Pa'in Bowkan =

- Location in Afghanistan
- Coordinates: 35°36′19″N 63°37′7″E
- Country: Afghanistan
- Province: Badghis Province
- Time zone: + 4.30

Pa'in Bowkan is a village in Badghis Province in north western Afghanistan.
