= Bala Bowkan =

- Location in Afghanistan
- Coordinates: 35°34′44″N 63°38′16″E
- Country: Afghanistan
- Province: Badghis Province
- Time zone: + 4.30

Bala Bowkan is a village in Badghis Province in north western Afghanistan.
