= Qala i Naw Airport =

- IATA: LQN; ICAO: OAQN

Summary
- Airport type: Public/Military
- Owner: Afghanistan
- Serves: Qala i Naw, Badghis Province
- Location: Qala i Naw, Afghanistan
- Elevation AMSL: 2,968 ft / 905 m
- Coordinates: 34°59′09″N 63°07′04″E

Map
- Location of airport in Afghanistan

Runways
Direction	Length		Surface
Direction	m	ft	Surface
04/22	1,999	6,560	Concrete
- Sources: Landings.com, AIP Afghanistan

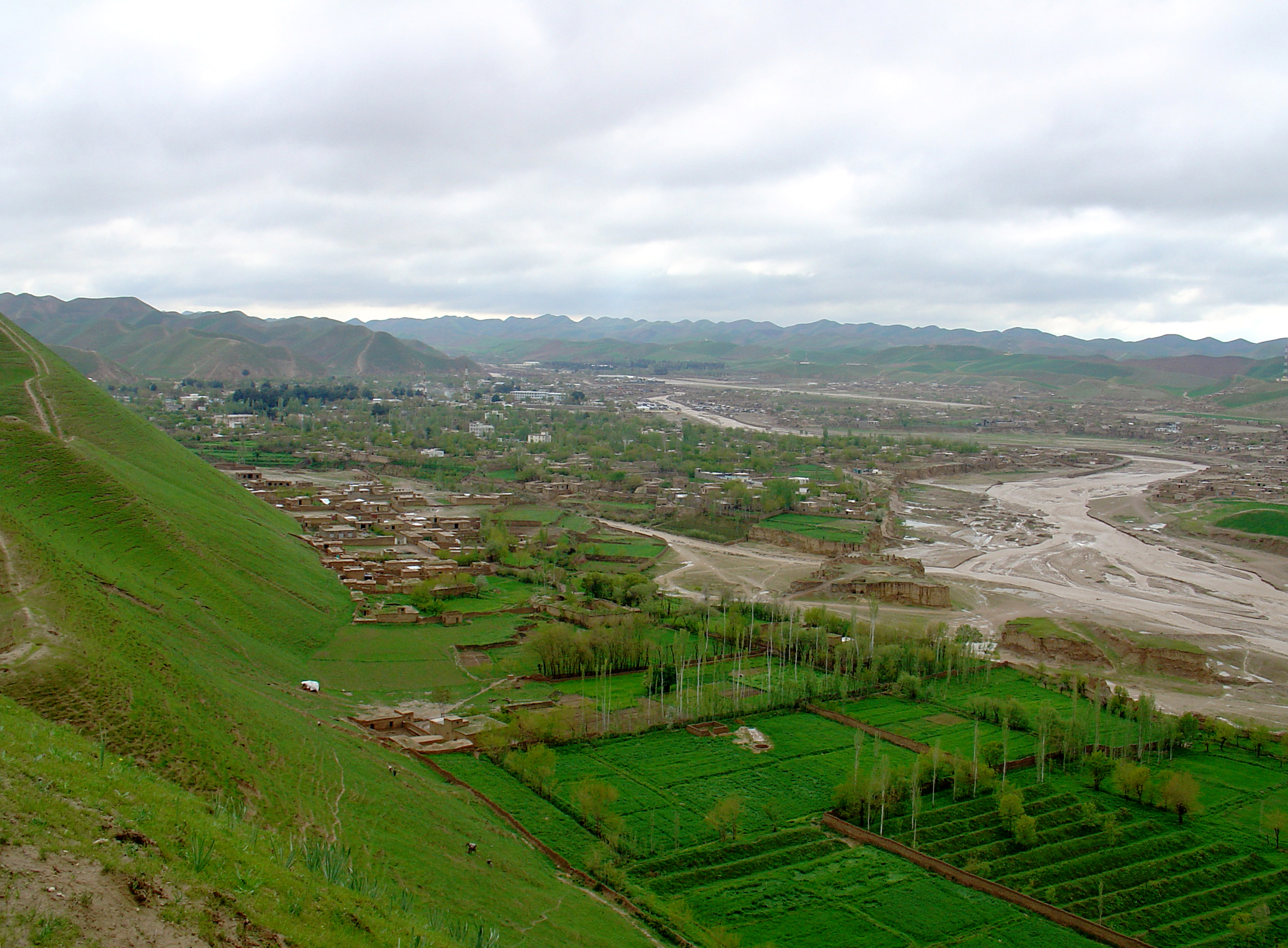

Qala i Naw Airport (IATA: LQN, ICAO: OAQN); (Dari: میدان هوایی قلعه نو) is a small airport serving the city of Qala i Naw in Badghis Province, Afghanistan. It is also known as Qala Nau Airport. It previously had scheduled services with the now defunct Pamir Airways.

This airport is unique because the runway was originally a highway utilized when there was no air traffic. The runway lies adjacent to the site of a former Spanish forward operating base (FOB), now transferred to the Afghan government. The airport is mainly used for military purposes, including by the Afghan Air Force.

== See also ==
- List of airports in Afghanistan
