= Muqur District, Badghis =

Coordinates: 35°01′41″N 63°16′12″E

Muqur مقر
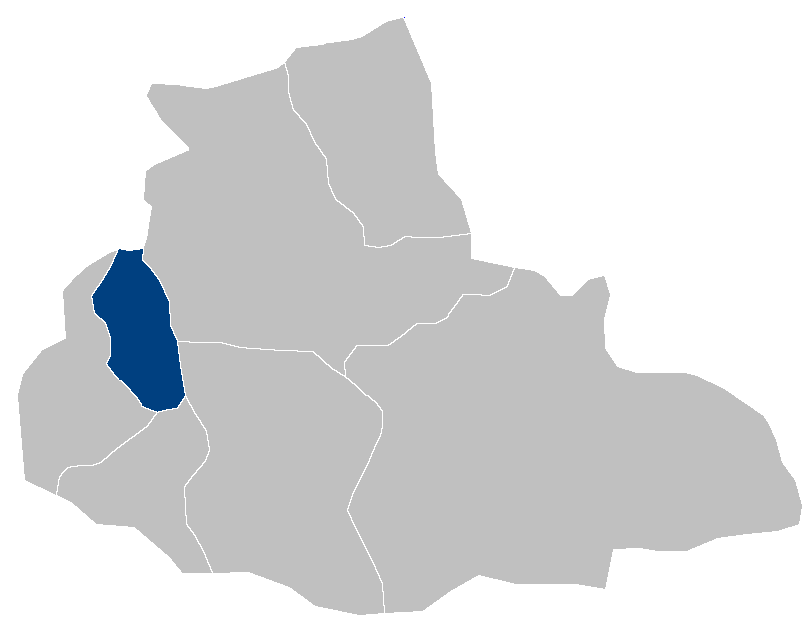
- Muqur District within Badghis Province
- Country: Afghanistan
- Province: Badghis

Government
  - Type: District council

Area
  - Total: 1,133 km^{2} (437 sq mi)

Muqur District (Pashto: مقر Dari: مقر) is a district located within Badghis Province in the western part of Afghanistan. It is located between the districts of Ab Kamari to the east, Qala i Naw to the south, Qadis to the southeast and Bala Murghab to the northeast. To the north is the national border with Turkmenistan. The district is in a long river valley. The estimated population in 2019 was 26,375.
