= Shah-e Mashhad =

Former madrasa in Afghanistan

- شاه مشهد ښوونځۍ
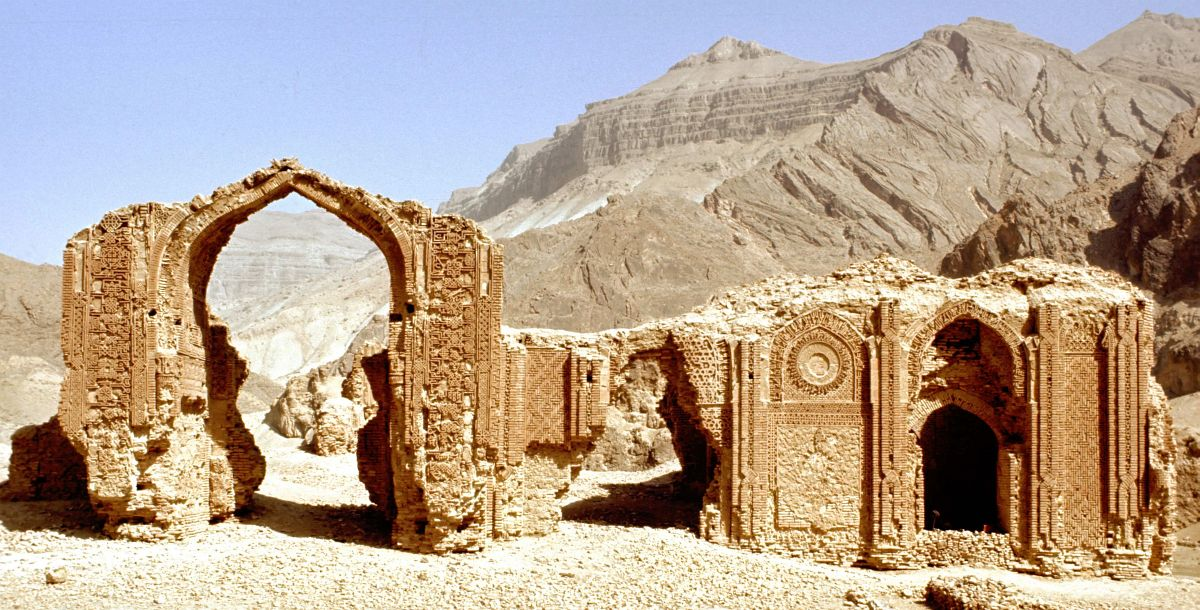

- Location of the ruins in Afghanistan

Religion
- Affiliation: Islam (former)
- Ecclesiastical or organizational status: Madrasa
- Status: Destroyed (ruinous state)

Location
- Country: Afghanistan
- Interactive map of Shah-e Mashhad
- Coordinates: 35°2′7″N 63°59′34″E

Architecture
- Type: Islamic architecture
- Style: Ghurid
- Completed: 12th century CE
- Destroyed: c. 1980s (during the Soviet–Afghan War)

Specifications
- Length: 44 m (144 ft)
- Width: 44.2 m (145 ft)
- Dome: 2 (destroyed)
- Inscriptions: 15
- Materials: Fired bricks; terracotta

Shah-e Mashhad (Pashto: شاه مشهد ښوونځۍ) is a former Ghurid madrasa, in ruins, located in the Badghis province of Afghanistan. Situated on the left bank of the Murgab River, the 12-century structure was reputably donated by an unknown woman. However, the architecture of the school building is Ghuridic in style.

== Overview ==
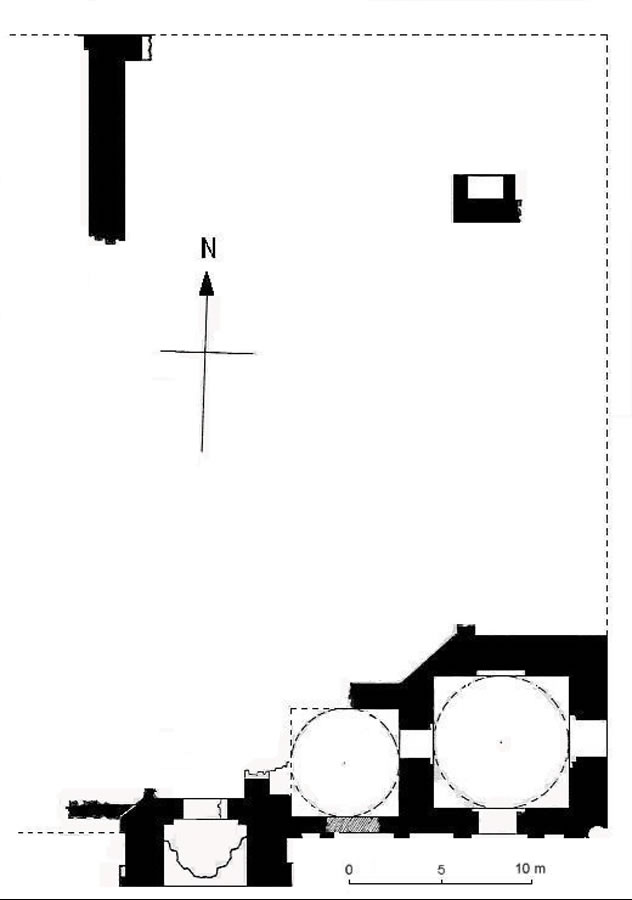
طرح مدرسه

The building is made of fired bricks forming a rough 44-by-44.2-metre (144 by 145 ft) square. Until the 1970s only larger parts of the south side of the building were preserved, which they are decorated with architectural ornaments and captions. The remains of an iwan and two rooms, each covered with a dome were also found in the building.

The north side walls of the building come from an iwan circulating around the inner courtyard. But no excavation was ever done to prove this.

The façade is decorated with a rich terracotta relief with ornamental engravings. A total of 15 inscriptions could be documented, ten of them in Kufic style, three of them in Naskh style, and two of them in Thuluth style.

During the war of the Soviet Union in Afghanistan the remains of the mid-1980s were completely destroyed.
