= Marw al-Rudh =

Historical town near Merv in Khorasan

Coordinates: 35°35′N 63°20′E

Map of Khurasan and Transoxiana and their major settlements in the early Middle Ages

Marw-Rud (Persian: مرورود, IPA: [mæɹvˈɹuːd]) or Marw al-Rudh (Arabic: مرو الروذ; lit. 'Marw on the river'), locally used to be known by the older variants Marwarudh (مروروذ) and Marrudh (مروذ), was a medieval settlement in Khurasan. It was also known as Marw-i Kuchik (مرو کوچک; lit. 'Little Marw') to distinguish it from the nearby Marw al-Shahijan or Greater Marw.

The town was located near the modern Afghan settlement of Bala Murghab, at the site where the Murghab River leaves the mountains of Gharjistan and enters the steppe of the Karakum Desert. The modern settlement of Maruchak or Marv-i Kuchik, although named after the medieval town, appears to be the site of a former suburb of it, named Qasr-i Ahnaf.

The town existed already in pre-Islamic times, its foundation being attributed to the Sasanian king Bahram Gur (reigned 420–438). Its original name in Persian was Marwirōd (مرورود) or Marvirot (Mrot in Armenian), which survived in the later Arabic nisbas of al-Marwarrudhi and al-Marrudhi. A Nestorian bishopric is attested there in 553, and in 652, during the Muslim conquest of Persia, the local governor Badham submitted to the Muslims and became a client ruler.

The Abbasid-era geographers report that the town was the centre of a flourishing agricultural region, with a number of dependent suburbs such as Qasr-i Ahnaf. According to al-Muqaddasi, who wrote in ca. 980, the locals were kin of the people of Gharjistan, and the town was a dependency of the rulers, or Shirs, of Gharjistan. A section of the Harbiyya district of the Round city of Baghdad was named Marwrūdiyya (مرورودية) after the people from this city. The town continued to flourish under the Seljuk Empire, when the Seljuk ruler Ahmad Sanjar built the city a new wall, some 5,000 paces in circumference. The town and the surrounding area suffered during the constant conflicts between the Khwarazmshahs and the Ghurids in the late 12th century, and a battle was fought there between the Ghurid ruler Ghiyath al-Din Muhammad (r. 1163–1202) and his Khwarazmian rival Sultan Shah (r. 1172–1193) in 1190. Although the town appears to have escaped the destruction of Marw al-Shahijan by the Mongols, it fell into ruin under the Timurids and was largely abandoned.

== Sources ==
- Bosworth, C. E. (1991). "Marw al- Rūd̲h̲". In Bosworth, C. E.; van Donzel, E. & Pellat, Ch. (eds.). The Encyclopaedia of Islam, Second Edition. Volume VI: Mahk–Mid. Leiden: E. J. Brill. pp. 617–618. doi:10.1163/1573-3912_islam_SIM_4977. ISBN 978-90-04-08112-3.
