= Jawand District =

Coordinates: 35°03′34″N 64°09′03″E

Jawand جِوَند
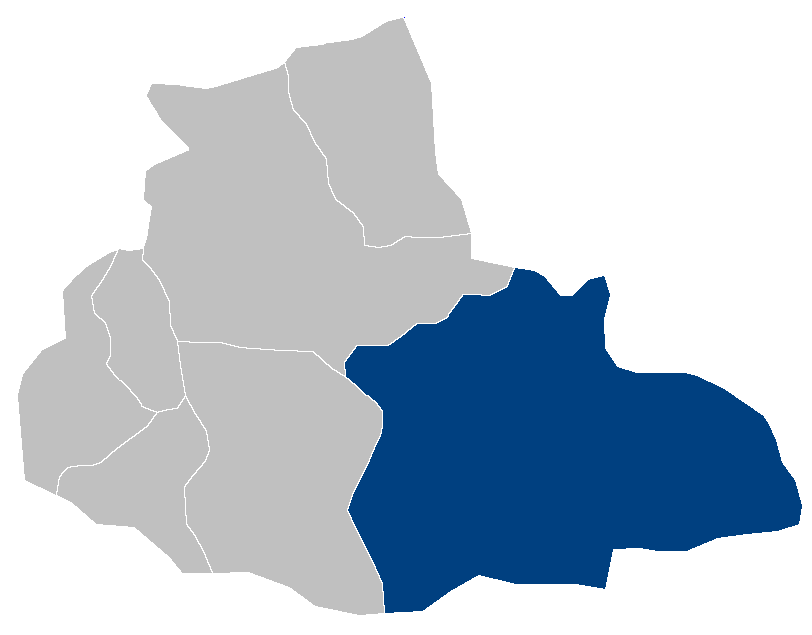
- Location of Jawand District in Badghis Province
- District: Badghis

Government
  - Type: District council

Area
  - Total: 7,146 km^{2} (2,759 sq mi)

Jawand (Pashto: ژوند Dari: ژوند) is the largest district of Badghis Province, Afghanistan, located in the southeast. Its population is estimated at 186,000, although a 1990 estimate by the United States Agency for International Development (USAID) puts the population at 46,403. Its capital is Jawand.

Jawand has approximately 380 villages, with nearly all of them ravaged by poverty, hunger and disease. There are no paved roads, no doctors or medical clinics and no schools.
