= Islamic Council of Herat =

The Islamic Council of Herat is a political body in Herat Province, Afghanistan, which consists of scholars, religious figures, independent civic foundations and non-government bodies. It is a loose conglomeration created to voice concerns, particularly security issues, which they feel the provincial government is not adequately addressing.
