= Jawand =

- Location in Afghanistan
- Coordinates: 35°3′34″N 64°9′3″E
- Country: Afghanistan
- Province: Badghis Province
- District: Jawand District
- Time zone: + 4.30

Jawand (also romanized as Javand) is a town and the capital of Jawand District, in Badghis Province, Afghanistan.
