= Qala e Naw =

Qala-e-Naw قلعه نو
- Provincial capital
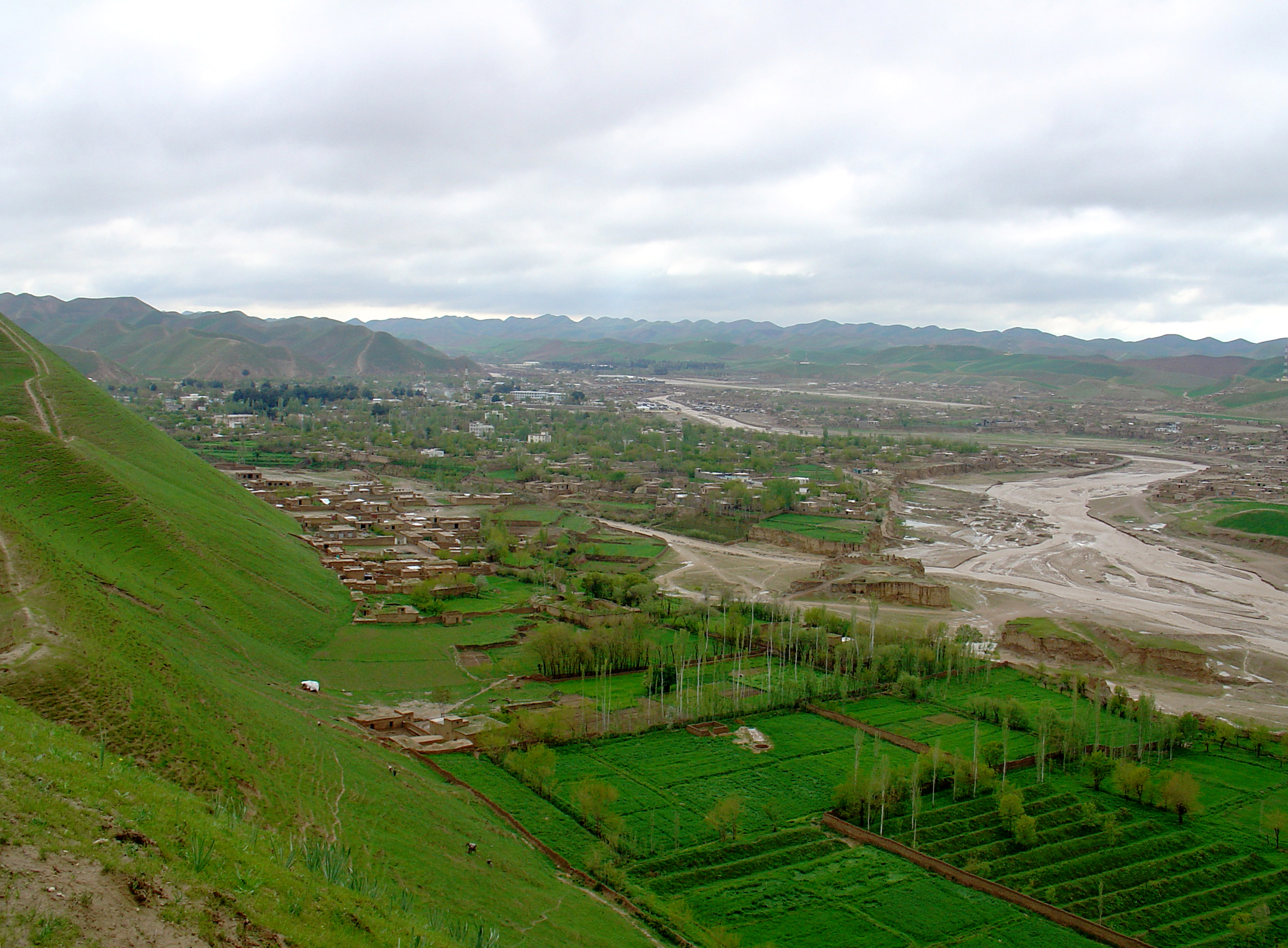
- Approach to Qala-e-Naw

- Location in Afghanistan
- Coordinates: 34°59′12″N 63°7′45″E
- Country: Afghanistan
- Province: Badghis
- District: Qala-e-Naw

Government
  - Type: Municipality

Area
  - Land: 28 km^{2} (11 sq mi)
- Elevation: 967 m (3,173 ft)

Population (2025)
  - Provincial capital: 82,797
  - Density: 3,000/km^{2} (7,700/sq mi)
  - Urban: 19,087
  - Rural: 63,710
- Time zone: UTC+04:30 (Afghanistan Time)
- ISO 3166 code: AF-QLN

Qala-e-Naw (Pashto (Note: Pashto pronunciation: [qaˈlɑ(.)ɪ naʊ]) and Dari: (Note: Dari pronunciation: [qalˈ(ʔ)a‿(j)ɪ naw]) قلعه نو; lit. 'New Fortress') is a city in northwestern Afghanistan, serving as the capital of Badghis Province. It is within the jurisdiction of Qala e Naw District and has an estimated population of 82,797 people.

Qala-e-Naw is home to Badghis University, which is located in the northern part of the city. The Qala i Naw Airport is located in the northwestern part of the city. The Afghanistan Ring Road passes in the city and this makes it one of the major stops for travelers.

Qala-e-Naw has a land area of 28 km^{2} (11 sq mi) or 3,752 ha (9,270 acres). It is administratively divided into 6 city districts (nahias). In 2015 there were about 7,125 dwelling units in the city.

== History ==
On 7 July 2021, the Taliban began an assault on the city which culminated in defeat by Afghan forces. The other side claimed that at least 69 Taliban fighters were killed and 23 injured. The city was captured by the Taliban on 12 August 2021, around the same time as the fall of Herat, becoming the thirteenth provincial capital to be seized as part of the wider 2021 Taliban offensive.

== Geography ==
Qala-e-Naw is located north of the Paropamisus Mountains (Selseleh-ye Safīd Kūh). Barren land accounts for 49% of its land area and only 28% is classified as built-up. Of the built-up land, 60% is residential.District 4 has a large institutional and transportation land use as a result of the airport located there.

=== Climate ===
Qala i Naw has a mediterranean climate (Köppen climate classification Csa), with hot summers and cold winters. Precipitation mostly falls in winter and early spring. Snow is common in winter.

Climate data for Qala e Naw
Month	Jan	Feb	Mar	Apr	May	Jun	Jul	Aug	Sep	Oct	Nov	Dec	Year
Record high °C (°F)	23.2 (73.8)	25.4 (77.7)	32.7 (90.9)	33.5 (92.3)	39.1 (102.4)	42.5 (108.5)	42.8 (109.0)	40.0 (104.0)	37.7 (99.9)	35.0 (95.0)	30.5 (86.9)	26.5 (79.7)	42.8 (109.0)
Mean daily maximum °C (°F)	6.3 (43.3)	7.4 (45.3)	14.9 (58.8)	21.9 (71.4)	29.0 (84.2)	33.7 (92.7)	35.8 (96.4)	33.5 (92.3)	29.0 (84.2)	23.0 (73.4)	16.7 (62.1)	10.2 (50.4)	21.8 (71.2)
Daily mean °C (°F)	0.1 (32.2)	2.4 (36.3)	3.6 (38.5)	15.1 (59.2)	20.8 (69.4)	25.8 (78.4)	28.2 (82.8)	25.3 (77.5)	20.5 (68.9)	14.0 (57.2)	8.6 (47.5)	3.9 (39.0)	14.0 (57.2)
Mean daily minimum °C (°F)	−4.0 (24.8)	−2.4 (27.7)	2.9 (37.2)	8.9 (48.0)	12.0 (53.6)	15.8 (60.4)	18.2 (64.8)	16.1 (61.0)	10.0 (50.0)	5.0 (41.0)	1.8 (35.2)	−0.8 (30.6)	7.0 (44.5)
Record low °C (°F)	−27.3 (−17.1)	−26.1 (−15.0)	−10.9 (12.4)	−9.0 (15.8)	2.3 (36.1)	6.6 (43.9)	11.2 (52.2)	6.3 (43.3)	0.2 (32.4)	−7.0 (19.4)	−9.6 (14.7)	−23.4 (−10.1)	−27.3 (−17.1)
Average precipitation mm (inches)	63.9 (2.52)	77.0 (3.03)	97.5 (3.84)	47.3 (1.86)	12.3 (0.48)	0.0 (0.0)	0.0 (0.0)	0.0 (0.0)	0.6 (0.02)	6.7 (0.26)	17.9 (0.70)	53.4 (2.10)	376.6 (14.81)
Average rainy days	5	7	10	9	3	0	0	0	0	2	4	5	45
Average snowy days	6	5	3	0	0	0	0	0	0	0	1	3	18
Average relative humidity (%)	78	75	75	70	53	39	37	37	43	53	60	76	58
Mean monthly sunshine hours	127.4	120.8	170.9	162.5	264.0	344.8	367.2	334.0	310.8	197.0	175.4	110.2	2,685
Source: NOAA (1970–1983)
