= Qala e Naw District =

Qala-e-Naw قلعه‌نو
- District
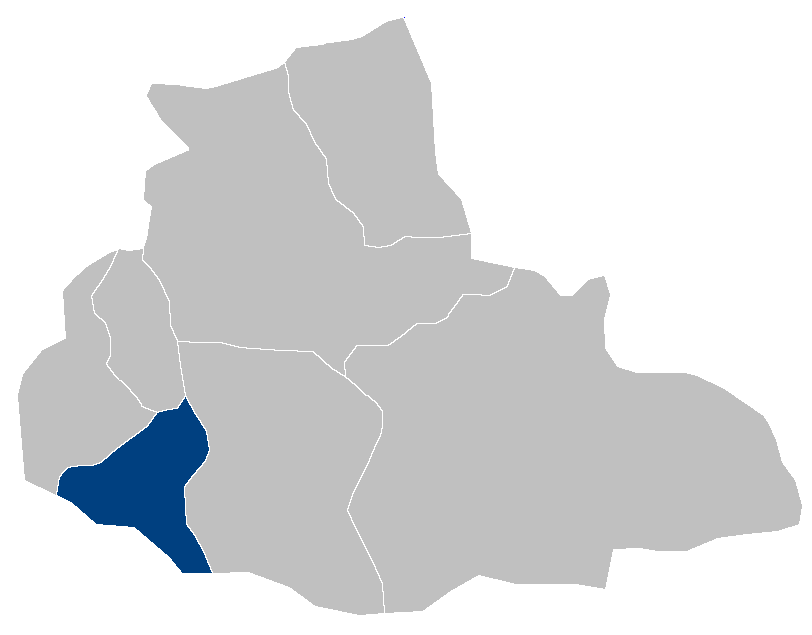
- Qala e Naw District location in Badghis Province

- Location in Afghanistan
- Coordinates: 34°59.2′N 63°7.1′E
- Country: Afghanistan
- Province: Badghis
- Capital: Qala e Naw
- Time zone: UTC+4:30

Qala-e-Naw, also Qalay-e-Naw or Qalanou (Dari: قلعه‌نو) is a district in the west of Badghis Province, Afghanistan. The majority of its population are Sunni Hazaras, with significant numbers of Tajiks, Pashtuns, Balochs, Uzbeks, and Turkmens.

The district capital is Qala e Naw city, which is also the provincial capital. The district is known for its pistachio forests.

== See also ==
- Qala e Naw
