= Ab Kamari District =

Coordinates: 35.0833°N 63.050°E

Ab Kamari
- District
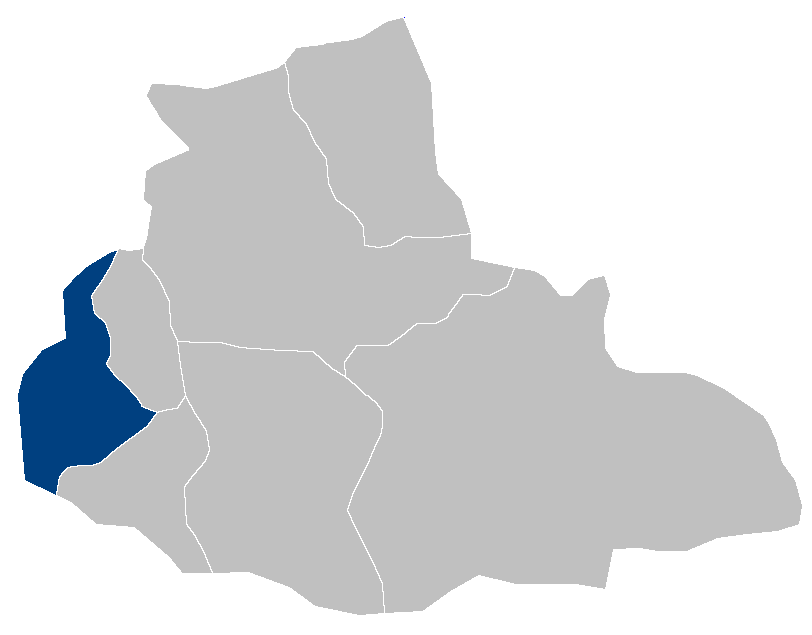
- Ab Kamari District within Badghis Province
- Country: Afghanistan
- Province: Badghis

Area
  - Land: 1,817 km^{2} (702 sq mi)

Population
  - Estimate (2002): 36,300

Ab Kamari (Dari: آب کماری) is a district in the west of Badghis Province, Afghanistan. Its population was estimated at 36,300 in 2002, the ethnic makeup of which was approximately 100 % hazara The district capital is Sang Atesh. Other localities include Ab Khuda'i, Alkhan, Anjir, Duzdanak, Gana Gul, Khalifa, and Papal. Ab Kamari is known for its pistachio forests.
