= Gharchistan =

Medieval region of northwestern Afghanistan

Gharjestan (Persian: غرجستان), also Gharchestan, Gharshistan, Gharchegan, Garshestan, was a historical region comprising the large mountainous land located between Herat and Kabul. The area comprised the lands later known as Hazarajat.

Gharjistan was originally known as "Garshestan", derived from the Avestan word "Garsh" and the Persian suffix "stan". It was later Arabized to "Gharjistan". The Avestan word "Gar" meant "mountain", and was mentioned in the Yasna. The word "Giro" in Hazaragi is widely used in the mountainous regions of Gharjistan.

Earlier Arab geographers called the area "Gharj al-Shar". "Shar", similar to the Persian "Shah", was a regional title used for kings, and, according to Muqaddasi, the word "Gharj" meant mountain in the local language, and therefore, Gharj al-Shar meant "mountain of the king". In the late Middle Ages, the land was called Gharjistan.

Ibn Hawqal, a Muslim geographer from the fourth century AH, wrote about Gharj al-Shar during his observations of Bamyan: Gharj al-Shar has two cities, one is Bashin and the other is Shurmain. Both cities are of equal size and have water and gardens. The sultan to whom this land is attributed and who is called "Shar" resides in the village of Bilikan.

== Sources ==
- Lewis, Bernard (1991). "Ghardjistān". The Encyclopedia of Islam, New Edition, Volume II: C-G. Leiden and New York: BRILL. pp. 1010–1011. ISBN 90-04-07026-5.
- Bosworth, C. E. (1975). "The early Ghaznavids". In Frye, R. N. (ed.). The Cambridge History of Iran, Volume 4: From the Arab Invasion to the Saljuqs. Cambridge: Cambridge University Press. pp. 162–198. ISBN 0-521-20093-8.
