= Badghis Province =

Province of Afghanistan

Badghis ولایت بادغیس (Dari) د بادغیس ولایت (Pashto)
- Province
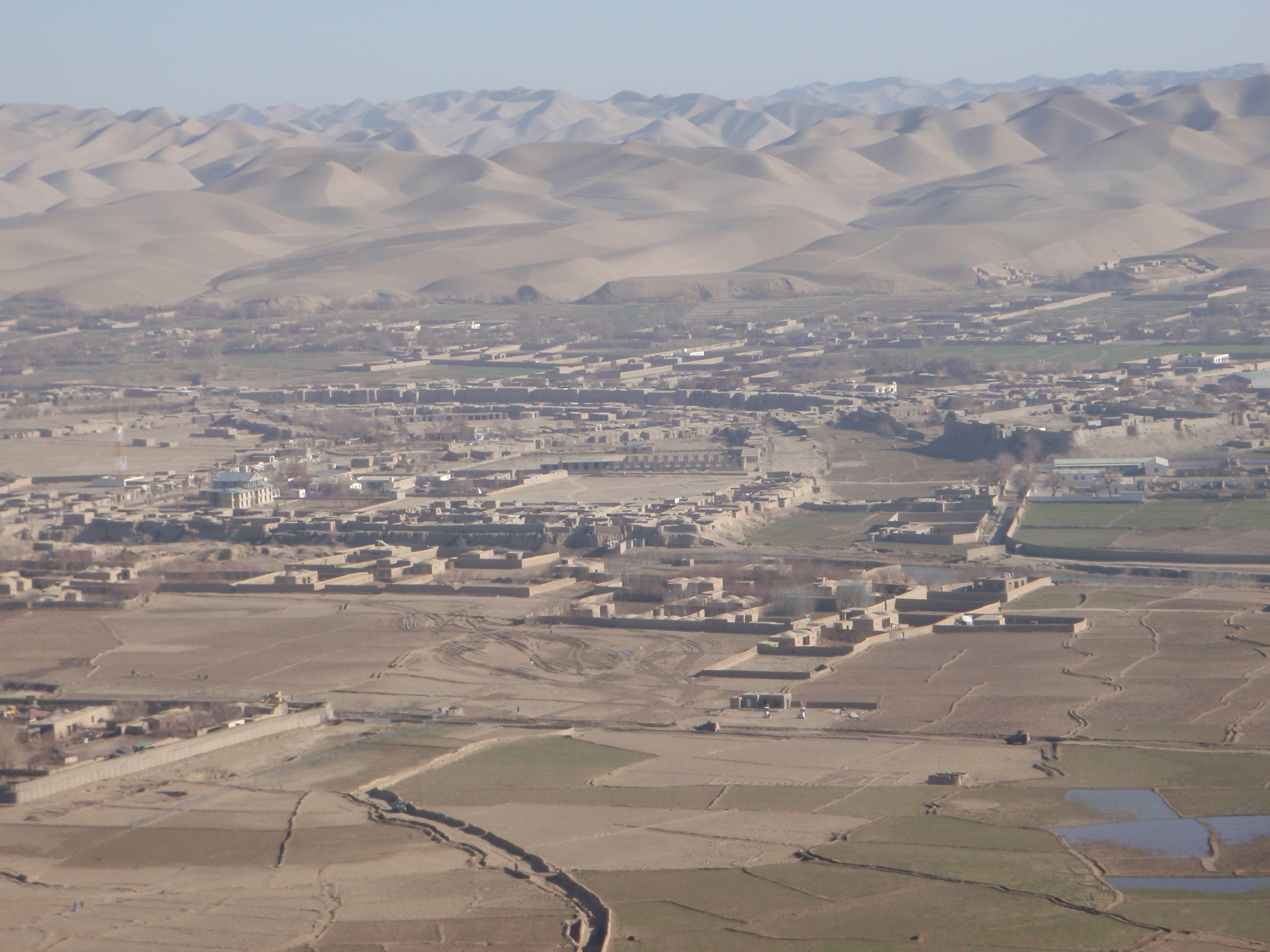
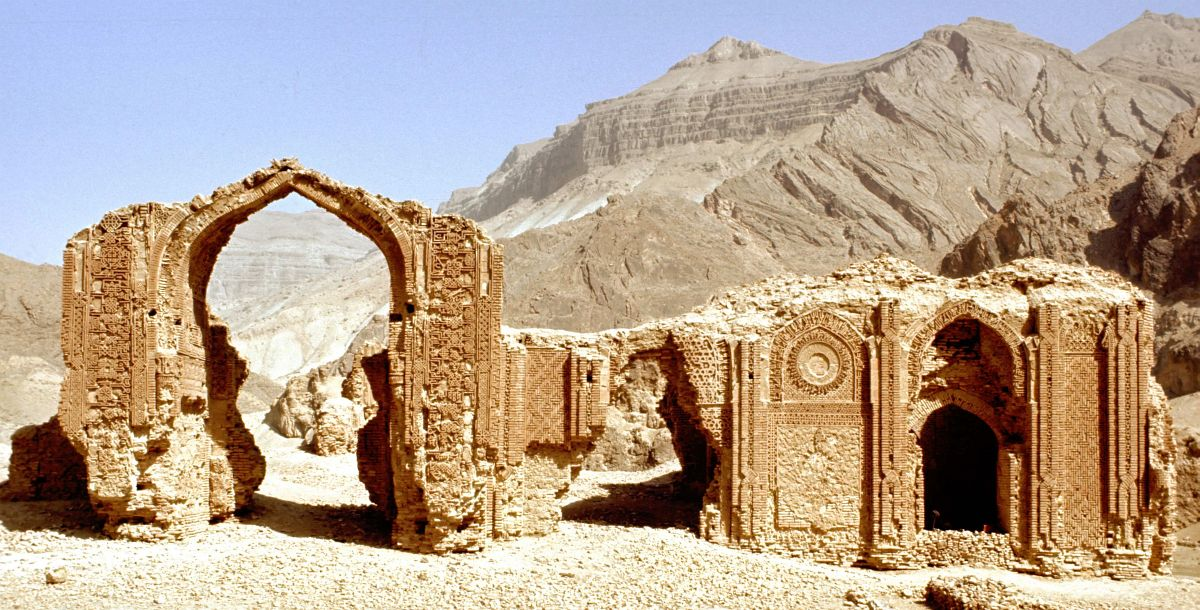
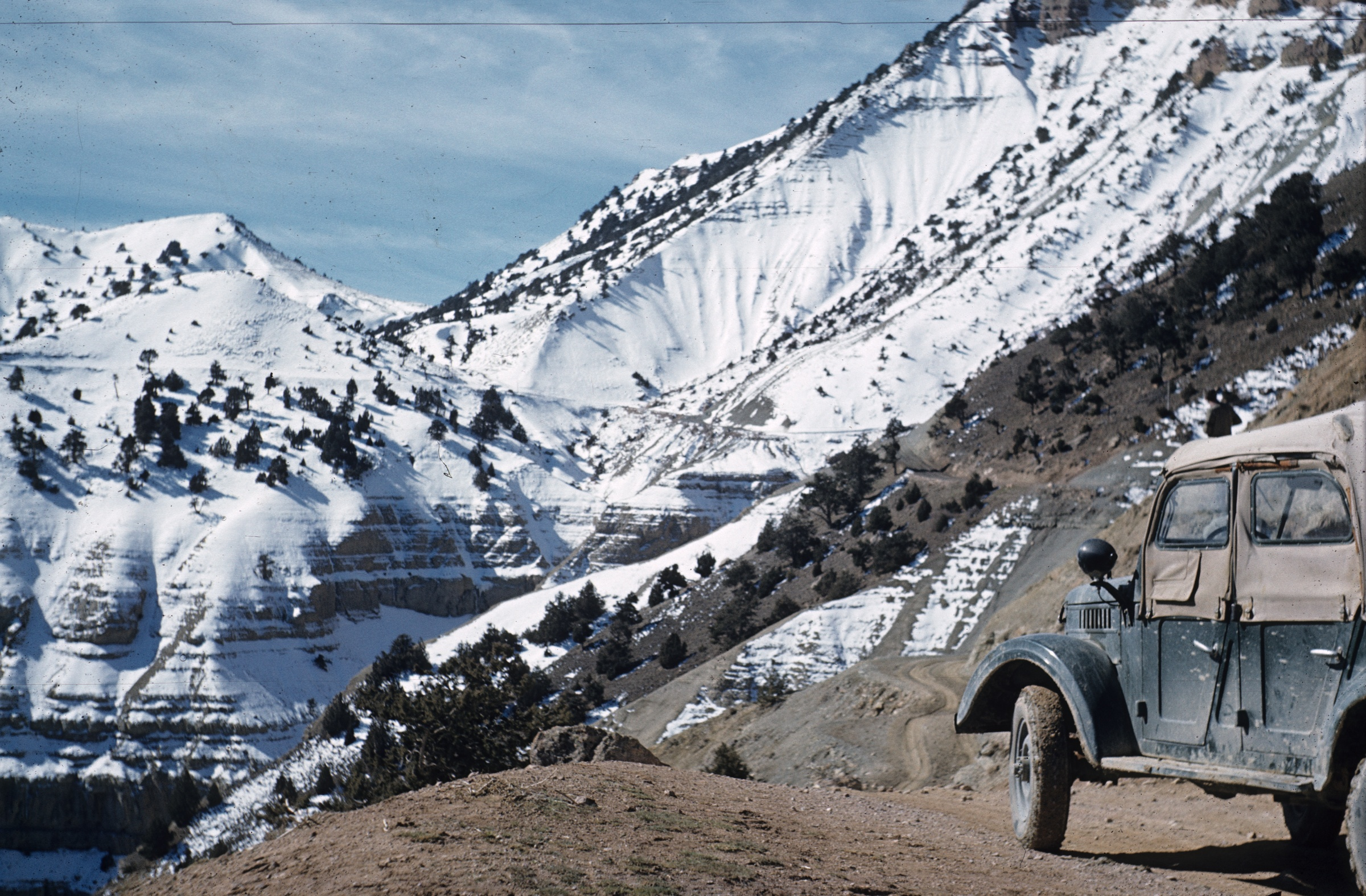
- From the top, Bala Murghab, Shah-e Mashhad, Sabzak Pass

- Map of Afghanistan with Badghis highlighted
- Coordinates (Capital): 35°0′N 63°45′E
- Country: Afghanistan
- Capital: Qala e Naw
- Largest city: Bala Murghab

Government
  - Governor: Mawlawi Mohammad Amin Jan Omari

Area
  - Total: 20,794 km^{2} (8,029 sq mi)
  - Water: 0 km^{2} (0 sq mi)

Population (2023)
  - Total: c. 550,000
  - Density: 23.9/km^{2} (62/sq mi)
- Demonym: Badghisi
- Time zone: UTC+4:30 (Afghanistan Time)
- Postal Code: 33XX
- ISO 3166 code: AF-BDG
- Main languages: Dari, Pashto

Badghis (Dari: ولایت بادغیس, romanized: Wilāyat-e Bādghīs and Pashto: د بادغیس ولایت, romanized: Da Bādghīs Wilāyat) is one of the northwestern provinces of Afghanistan. It borders Turkmenistan to the north, Herat to the west and southwest, Ghor to the south and southeast, and Faryab to the east. The provincial capital is Qala e Naw, serving as the main administrative, economic, and cultural hub of the province.

Covering an area of approximately 20,000 square kilometers and having an estimated population of about 550,000 people (as of 2025), Badghis is characterized by rolling hills, semi-arid plains, and the western extensions of the Hindu Kush mountains. The province is drained primarily by the Murghab River and its tributaries, which provide essential water for agriculture in an otherwise dry landscape. Badghis is sparsely populated compared to more fertile provinces and faces challenges such as soil erosion, desertification, and limited infrastructure.

Historically, Badghis was part of the larger region of northwestern Afghanistan known for its strategic position connecting Central Asia and Greater Khorasan. The area has been inhabited for millennia, witnessing the passage of Persian, Hellenistic, Sassanid, Ghaznavid, and Timurid powers. It was also a frontier zone prone to tribal conflicts and shifting allegiances, which shaped the province's decentralized governance patterns.

Today, Badghis remains a region of strategic importance but is marked by underdevelopment, limited economic opportunities, and recurring environmental challenges. Agriculture and livestock herding dominate livelihoods, while migration for work to other provinces or neighboring countries is common. The province retains a strong cultural identity shaped by its history, tribal structures, and natural environment.

== Etymology ==
The name Badghis comes from Middle Persian wādgēs meaning "mount", tracing further back to the term waiti-gaisa (Avestan: 𐬬𐬁𐬌𐬙𐬌-𐬔𐬀𐬉𐬯𐬀, romanized: vāiti-gaēsa). This etymology suggests that the province's name originally referred to its hilly or elevated terrain, rather than climatic conditions.

== History ==
=== Antiquity ===
Badghis has been inhabited since prehistoric times, with archaeological evidence indicating early settlements along the Murghab River and its tributaries. The region's semi-arid plains and river valleys supported small agricultural communities and pastoral nomads. During antiquity, Badghis was part of the larger cultural and political sphere of Greater Khorasan, a crossroads of civilizations linking Central Asia and the Iranian plateau. The region came under the control of the Achaemenid Empire (550–330 BCE), serving as a frontier zone connecting Persia to the steppes of Central Asia.

Following the conquest of Alexander the Great in the 4th century BCE, the area became influenced by Hellenistic culture and was incorporated into the Greco-Bactrian Kingdom, which brought Greek-style urbanization, trade networks, and coinage. Later, the region fell under the Sassanid Empire (224–651 CE), which reinforced its role as a strategic borderland and integrated it into long-distance trade routes, including the early Silk Road corridors. Its terrain and sparse population made centralized control difficult, leaving local tribal structures influential in governance.

=== Medieval times ===
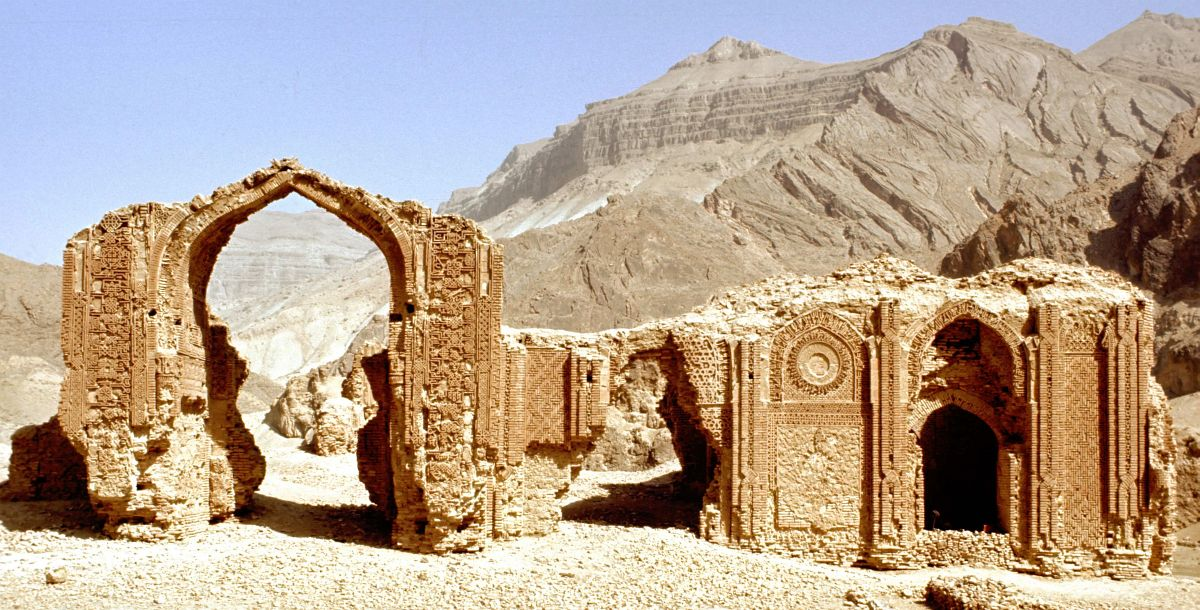
Ruins of the Shah-e Mashhad madrasa from the 12th century

In the medieval period, Badghis continued to occupy a strategic position between Persia, Central Asia, and the emerging Afghan polities. The poet Hanzala Badghisi flourished there in the mid-9th century. Badghis came under the Ghaznavid Empire (977–1186), which promoted agriculture and urban settlement in the region while using it as a frontier buffer against nomadic incursions. Around the 12th century, it was influenced by the Seljuk Empire and the Ghurid dynasty, periods marked by the spread of Islamic culture, architecture, and administrative systems.

Badghis was historically associated with the region of Gharjistan, with the city of Marw al-Rudh functioning as an administrative and commercial center. The area frequently witnessed tribal conflicts and shifting allegiances, reflecting its decentralized governance. During the Timurid Empire in the 14th and 15th century, the region maintained its strategic importance, though much of its population remained rural and pastoral. Its challenging terrain and semi-arid climate continued to limit large-scale urban development.

=== Early modern period ===
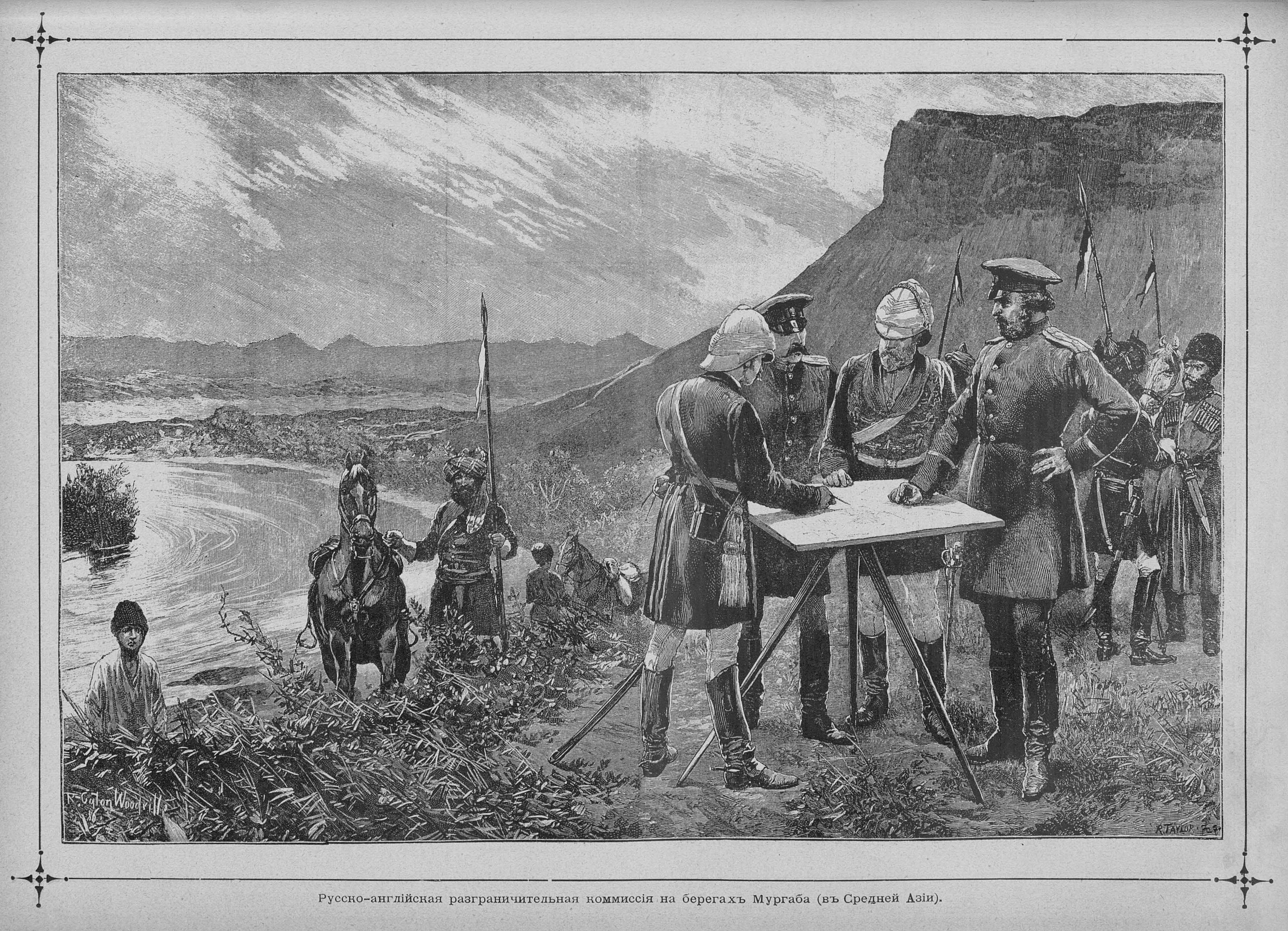
Russian-English demarcation commission next to the Murghab river banks (1886)

From the 16th to 19th centuries, Badghis was influenced by successive powers including the Safavid Empire and later the Durrani Empire, which laid the foundations of modern Afghanistan. The region's geographical position along trade routes connecting Herat and the Turkestan region reinforced its role as a frontier region. Local tribal leaders maintained significant autonomy, with frequent skirmishes and alliances shaping the political landscape.

Agriculture remained limited to irrigated valleys along the Murghab River, while livestock herding dominated in the upland areas. The semi-arid climate, combined with periodic droughts, constrained population growth and economic development. European explorers and geographers of the 19th century noted the rugged terrain, sparse settlements, and strategic importance as a buffer zone between Persian, Afghan, and Central Asian powers. In 1964, the province was carved out of portions of the Herat and Meymaneh provinces.

=== During war times (1979–2021) ===
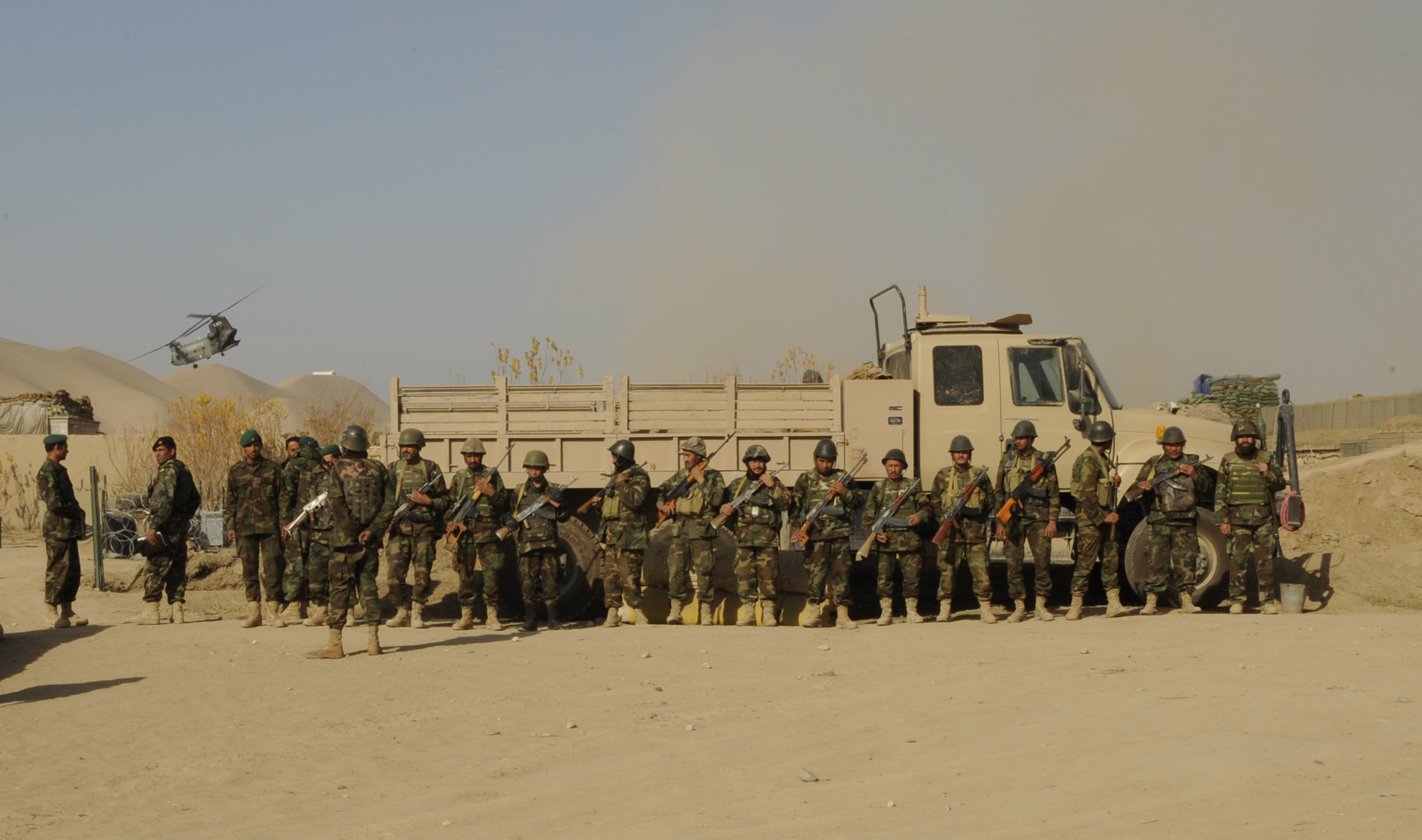
Afghan National Army soldiers in Bala Murghab (2008)

The Soviet–Afghan War profoundly affected Badghis. Its remote villages were heavily impacted by military operations, landmines, and forced displacement. After the Soviet withdrawal, the province became a contested area during the Afghan civil war, with various mujahideen factions and local warlords vying for control. During the first Taliban regime, Badghis was governed with limited state presence, and traditional tribal structures continued to influence social and political life.

After the 2001 American-led invasion of Afghanistan, the province remained strategically important due to its border with Turkmenistan and its mountainous, difficult-to-access terrain. During the time of the Islamic Republic, the province experienced ongoing insurgency, infrastructure challenges, and humanitarian crises, including food insecurity, limited access to education, and displacement of rural populations.

=== Today (since 2021) ===
Since the Taliban's return to power in 2021, the province has remained under their administration. As all provinces, Badghis continues to face significant development challenges. Infrastructure, healthcare, and education services are limited, while poverty and unemployment remain high. Agriculture and livestock herding are the main sources of livelihood, but recurrent droughts, soil erosion, and desertification continue to threaten food security.

== Geography ==
Badghis is located in northwestern Afghanistan and forms part of the transitional zone between the central Afghan highlands and the plains of southern Turkmenistan. The province has a total area of 20,591 km^{2}. It is characterized by inland drainage basins, steppe landscapes, river valleys, hills, and mountain foothills. It shares an international border with Turkmenistan to the north and borders Herat Province to the west and southwest, Ghor Province to the south and southeast, and Faryab Province to the east. The geographic position of the province places it at the intersection of Iranian, Central Asian, and Afghan natural regions.

=== Landscape ===
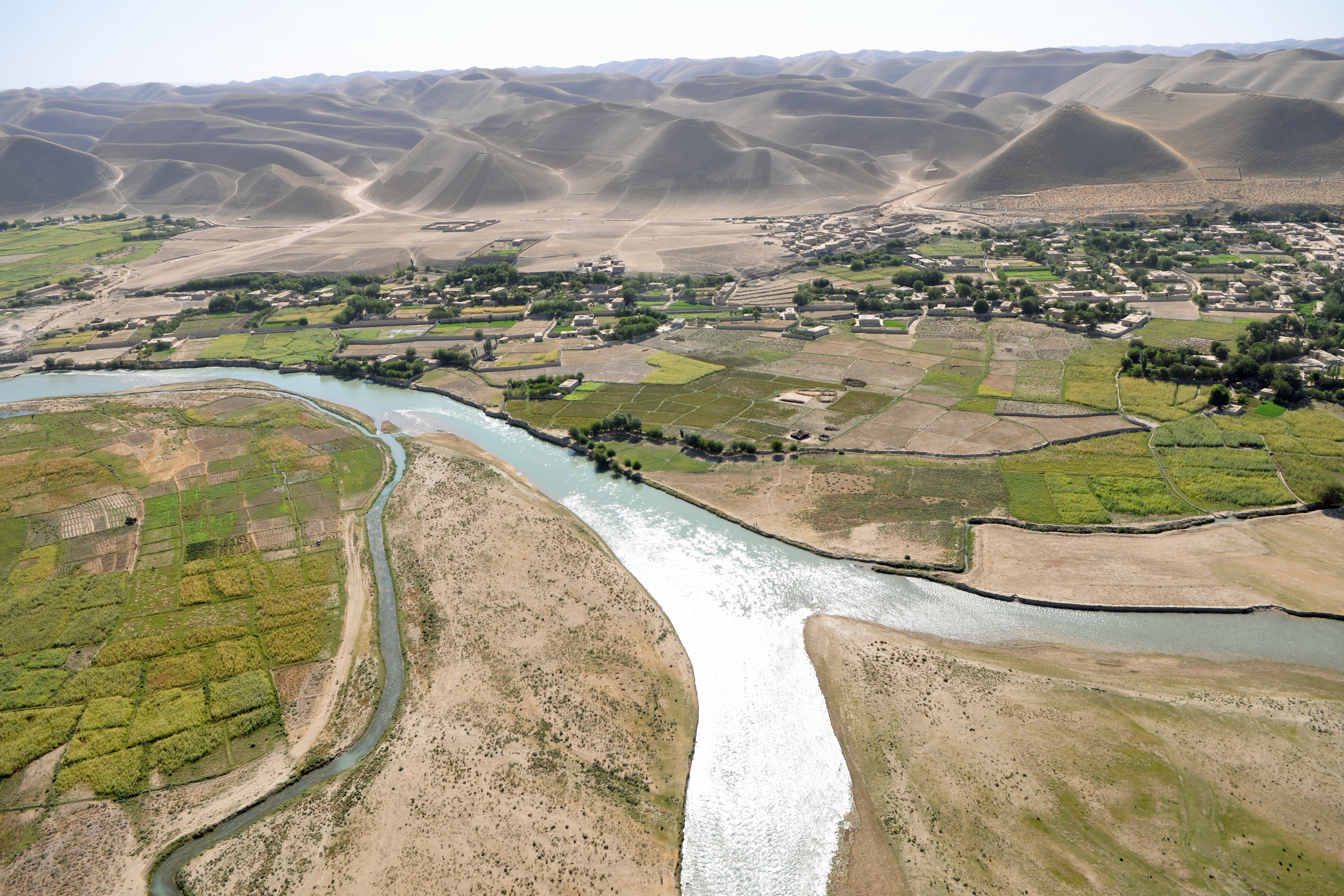
The Murghab river from above (2011)

Badghis consists mainly of rolling hills, plateaus, wide plains, and the western foothills of the Hindu Kush. Elevations generally range from about 500 to over 2,000 meters above sea level. The relief of Badghis is shaped by tectonic uplift, long-term erosion, and seasonal hydrological processes, creating soft ridgelines, dry valleys, and extensive grazing plains. The most important river system is the Murghab River, which originates in the central highlands of Afghanistan and flows northward across Badghis into Turkmenistan. Its tributaries, including numerous seasonal streams and wadis, form the primary surface water network of the province. These rivers support most permanent settlements and irrigated agriculture. Outside the main river valleys, surface water is scarce, and groundwater extracted from wells is often the only reliable source of water.

Large areas of Badghis consist of steppe and semi-desert landscapes characterized by thin soils, sparse vegetation, and high susceptibility to erosion. Its northern border extends to the edge of the part of the Karakum desert. The northern districts include the loess and other aeolian formations, known locally as the chul. In the southern and southeastern districts, the terrain becomes increasingly rugged as it rises into the outer ranges of the Hindu Kush. According to the World Wide Fund for Nature, the province lies primarily within the deserts and xeric shrublands and montane grasslands and shrublands biomes, which strongly influence ecological conditions and land use patterns.

=== Flora and Fauna ===
The vegetation of Badghis reflects its arid and semi-arid climate, with strong seasonal variation. Natural plant cover consists primarily of drought-tolerant grasses, shrubs, and annual herbs that provide pasture for livestock. In lowland and hillside areas, species such as wormwood, tamarisk, and various salt-resistant plants are common. In the irrigated river valleys, cultivated trees and crops dominate the landscape. Fruit-bearing trees such as apricots, mulberries, pomegranates, almonds, and walnuts are widely grown, along with wheat and barley. Wild pistachio and scattered juniper occur in some upland areas, though forest cover remains very limited due to deforestation, overgrazing, and fuelwood collection.

Badghis supports a range of wildlife species adapted to steppe, riverine, and semi-mountain environments. Mammals include wolves, jackals, foxes, gazelles, hares, and small populations of ibex and other wild goats in higher terrain. Reptiles are widespread in warmer lowland areas. Birdlife is diverse, with resident and migratory species using the river corridors as seasonal habitat. Raptors such as eagles, buzzards, and falcons are common, along with cranes, storks, and various waterfowl. Habitat degradation, drought, and unregulated hunting have increased pressure on several species.

=== Climate ===
Badghis has a predominantly semi-arid climate with strong continental characteristics and pronounced seasonal contrasts. Summers are hot and dry, with daytime temperatures in the lowlands frequently exceeding 35 °C. Heat waves and prolonged dry periods are common. Winters are cold, particularly in higher elevations, where temperatures often fall below freezing and snowfall occurs regularly in hill districts and mountain foothills.

Most annual precipitation falls between late winter and early spring, primarily in the form of rain at lower elevations and snow in higher terrain. Precipitation is highly variable from year to year, and prolonged droughts are a recurring feature of the regional climate. These droughts have a direct impact on agriculture, pasture productivity, surface water availability, and food security. Strong seasonal winds are frequent, especially in open plains and exposed ridges, contributing to dust storms, soil erosion, and the gradual expansion of desert-like conditions in vulnerable areas.

== Government and politics ==
=== Local governance ===
Local governance in Badghis has undergone significant changes since the 19th century. During this period, the province was largely governed by local tribal leaders, khans, and landholding elites who exercised substantial autonomy over taxation, security, and dispute resolution, while maintaining nominal allegiance to the Afghan central state. Due to the remote location of the province, direct control from Kabul remained limited for much of the late 19th and early 20th centuries. In the 20th century, successive Afghan governments sought to strengthen administrative control by formally integrating Badghis into the provincial system, appointing governors, and establishing district offices. Despite these efforts, local tribal networks, religious authorities, and influential families continued to play a dominant role in everyday governance, particularly in rural districts and grazing regions.

Since 1979, Badghis has experienced repeated political and administrative disruptions as a result of the Soviet–Afghan War, the subsequent Afghan civil wars, and later international intervention. During the 1980s, local mujahideen commanders controlled large parts of the province, coordinating resistance activities and administering territory through informal power structures. Following the collapse of the communist government, the province became an arena of competition between different armed factions, with shifting alliances and localized conflict, particularly the Jamiat-e Islami, the Hezb-e Islami Gulbuddin, and the Islamic Council of Herat. After 2001, the Afghan government re-established formal provincial administration through appointed governors and district officials. International development programs supported local governance institutions, while traditional mechanisms such as tribal councils and community elders continued to mediate disputes and regulate social affairs. However, insecurity, limited state capacity, and insurgent activity restricted the effectiveness of government authority, particularly in remote districts.

Following the Taliban's return to power in 2021, provincial administration in Badghis was reorganized under Taliban-appointed officials. The local governance system now follows the administrative structure of the Islamic Emirate, with a provincial governor and district leaders responsible for enforcing central directives. Political parties recognized under the former 2004 Afghan constitution are no longer active, while tribal elders, religious leaders, and local power brokers continue to exercise informal influence, especially in rural and mountainous areas.

As of December 2025, the governor of Badghis is Mawlawi Mohammad Amin Jan Omari.

=== Administrative divisions ===
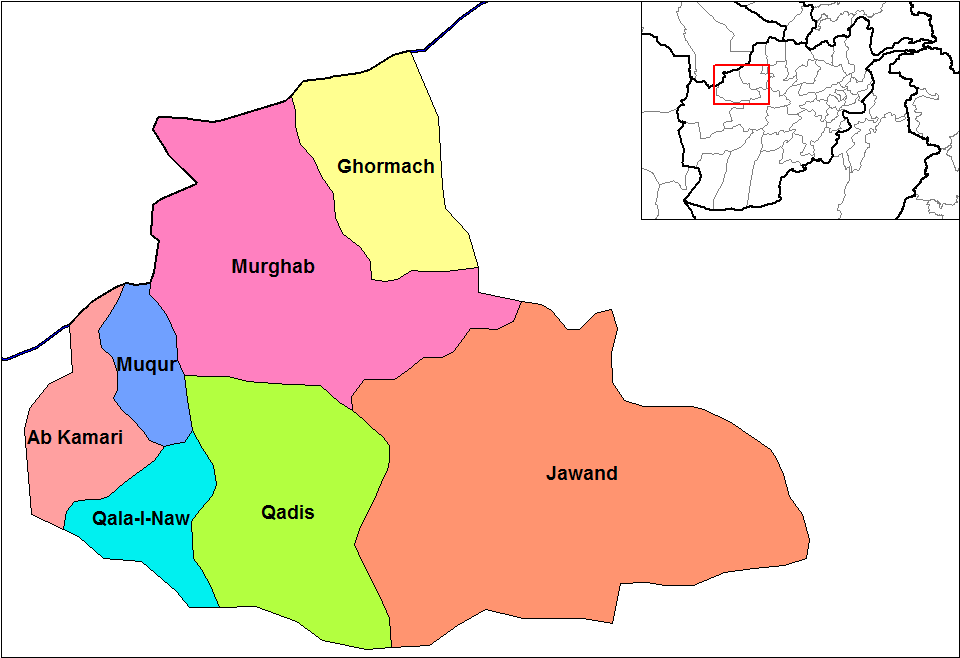
Map of the districts of Badghis as of January 2004, prior to the redrawing of provincial and district boundaries later that year

Badghis is administratively divided into several districts. The provincial capital, Qala e Naw, serves as the main administrative, economic, and logistical center of the province. Other major towns include Bala Murghab and Jawand. District boundaries and administrative structures have been periodically revised in line with national governance reforms.

Districts of Badghis Province
District	Capital	Population	Area	Pop. density	Ethnic categories
Ab Kamari		83,169	2,311	36	80% Tajiks, 20% Pashtuns.
Ghormach		62,311	1,782	35	97% Pashtun, 2% Aimaq, 1% Baloch.
Jawand		89,148	6,105	15	Mixed Pashtuns and Tajiks.
Muqur		26,838	620	43	Mixed Pashtuns and Tajiks.
Bala Murghab		109,874	4,237	26	85.6% Pashtuns, 7% Tajiks, 7% Turkmens, 0.3% Uzbeks.
Qadis		102,833	3,391	30	Mixed Pashtuns and Tajiks.
Qala i Naw		75,410	841	90	82% Tajiks, 10% Uzbeks, 5% Pashtuns, 3% Baloch, 1% Turkmen.
Badghis		549,583	20,794	26	51.7% Pashtuns, 44.9% Farsiwan (44.7% Tajiks, 0.2% Aimaqs), 0.5% Balochi, 1.5% Turkmens, 1.4% Uzbeks. (Note: "Predominantely" is interpreted as 99%, "majority" as 70%, "mixed" as 1/(number of ethnicities) and "minority" as 30%.)

== Economy ==
Badghis is considered to be one of the most underdeveloped of the country's thirty-four provinces. The province has a predominantly agrarian and pastoral economy, shaped by its semi-arid climate, scarce water resources, and geographical isolation. The majority of the population depends directly on agriculture and livestock herding for subsistence. Industrial activity is minimal, and formal employment opportunities remain scarce. Recurrent droughts, soil erosion, and desertification, combined with decades of conflict and underinvestment, continue to limit economic diversification and long-term development.

=== Agriculture and animal husbandry ===
Agriculture in Badghis is largely rainfed, with irrigation limited to river valleys along the Murghab River and its seasonal tributaries. The main crops include wheat, barley, and pulses, while horticulture plays a local role in irrigated zones. Fruit trees such as apricots, mulberries, pomegranates, pistachios, almonds, and walnuts are cultivated in suitable microclimates.

Livestock herding is another central pillar of the rural economy. Sheep, goats, and cattle are widely raised for meat, milk, wool, and hides. Nomadic and semi-nomadic pastoralism continues in upland areas, where seasonal migration supports grazing cycles. Agricultural production remains highly vulnerable to drought, rangeland degradation, limited veterinary services, and poor access to markets, which frequently leads to food insecurity. This development has been exacerbated by the excessive deforestation since 2001.

=== Mining ===
Badghis possesses largely underdeveloped mineral resources, including deposits of gypsum, marble, limestone, and construction stone, as well as indications of other industrial minerals. Mining activity remains small-scale and mostly informal, providing materials primarily for local construction. The absence of large-scale exploration, limited infrastructure, and long-term insecurity have prevented the development of a structured mining sector.

=== Trade ===
Trade is mainly local and regional, centered on district markets and the provincial capital, Qala e Naw. Agricultural products, livestock, dairy goods, and basic handicrafts dominate local commerce, while manufactured goods and fuel are imported from other Afghan provinces. It is also one of the carpet-making areas of the country. The province produced Karakul sheep until the late 1970s. Despite its border with Turkmenistan, cross-border trade remains limited due to weak transport links, low export capacity, and regulatory constraints. Most commercial activity operates at a small-scale, subsistence-oriented level.

=== Energy and irrigation ===
The energy infrastructure in Badghis is poorly developed. Most households rely on firewood and small diesel generators for electricity. Grid power is limited mainly to Qala e Naw and a few district centers. Irrigation remains essential for agriculture but is largely based on traditional canal systems, seasonal river diversions, and small water reservoirs. Several international aid projects have supported irrigation rehabilitation, rangeland management, and drought resilience, but large parts of the province still lack reliable water infrastructure, leading to the province having a chronic shortage of water.

=== Communication ===
Telecommunications services are unevenly distributed. Mobile phone coverage exists mainly in urban and semi-urban areas, while many rural districts experience weak or intermittent signals. Internet access is limited and generally slow. Traditional communication through tribal elders, mosques, and community councils continues to play a significant role in rural information exchange.

=== Transportation and infrastructure ===
Transport infrastructure is limited and underdeveloped, reflecting the province's remote location, rugged terrain, and sparse population. Most districts are connected by unpaved roads, which often become impassable during winter, seasonal flooding, or heavy rainfall. Even though there have been tries to connect the province to the Afghanistan Ring Road, connecting Bala Murghab with Herat Province in the southwest and Maymana and Mazar-i Sharif in the northeast, works never completed.

The provincial capital, Qala e Naw, serves as the main hub for administrative, commercial, and humanitarian transport, with automobile traffic being the dominant mode of movement for people and goods. There is no railway network in the province, restricting large-scale freight transport and regional integration. Qala i Naw Airport, a small domestic airport, provides occasional flights mainly for governmental, humanitarian, and limited commercial purposes.

== Demographics ==
=== Population ===
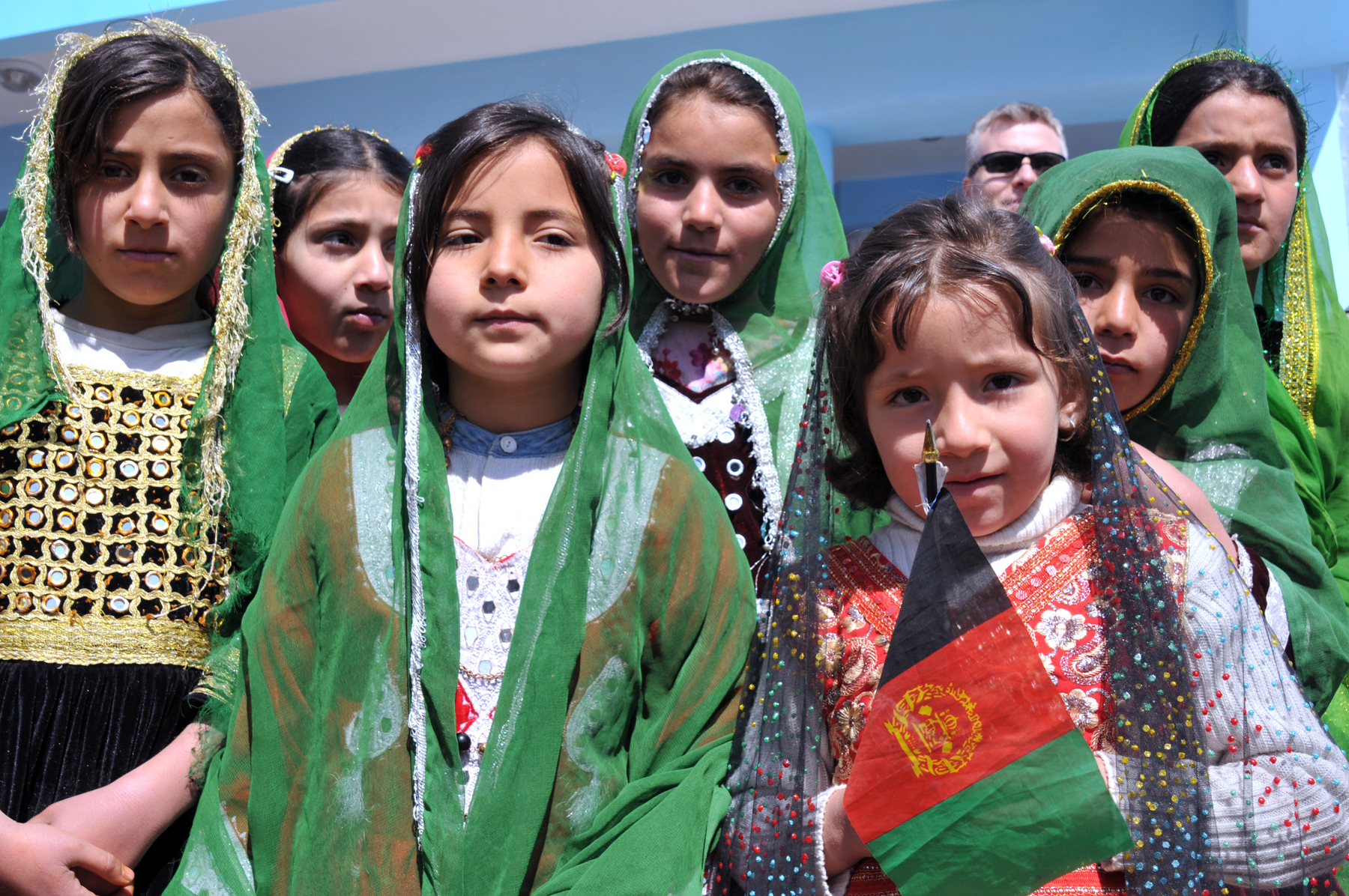
Children in Baghdis (2013)

Badghis has an estimated population of approximately 550,000 people as of 2023, distributed across a small number of urban centers, district towns, and a large number of rural villages. Only a minority of the population lives in urban areas, primarily in the provincial capital of Qala e Naw, while the vast majority resides in rural settlements and pastoral areas. Settlement patterns are strongly shaped by access to water sources, arable land, and grazing zones.

Poverty is widespread throughout the province, particularly in drought-prone districts, with a multidimensional poverty index of 0.426, and 47.7% of the population living in severe poverty as of 2023. A large share of households depends on subsistence agriculture and livestock, and many families experience seasonal food insecurity. Limited access to roads, electricity, healthcare, and education, combined with frequent droughts and displacement, contributes to high socio-economic vulnerability. Environmental shocks, especially prolonged dry periods, regularly force temporary migration to other Afghan provinces or neighboring countries in search of work and pasture.

=== Ethnicity, languages, and religion ===
The population of Badghis is ethnically mixed, reflecting historic migration, tribal settlement, and its location between northern and western Afghanistan. The largest ethnic category are Tajiks, followed by a significant community of Pashtuns. There are also smaller groups of Uzbeks, Turkmens, Hazaras and Baloch. Ethnic identities often overlap with tribal affiliations, and intermarriage is common in many districts. Dari serves as the main lingua franca and is widely spoken across all ethnic groups. Pashto, Uzbek, and Turkmen are also spoken in areas where their respective communities predominate. Multilingualism is widespread, particularly in market towns and mixed villages. The religious landscape of Badghis is overwhelmingly Sunni Muslim. Shia communities are very small and scattered. Local religious leaders and mosques play an important role in social life, dispute mediation, and community organization, particularly in rural areas.

Estimated ethnolinguistic and -religious composition
Ethnicity	Tajik/ Farsiwan	Pashtun	Uzbek	Turkmen	Baloch	Hazara	Sources
Period	Tajik/ Farsiwan	Pashtun	Uzbek	Turkmen	Baloch	Hazara	Sources

2004–2021 (Islamic Republic)	>50 – 62%	28 – 40%	5%	3%	1 – 2%	1%
2020 EU	1st	2nd	3rd	4th	–	–
2018 UN	62%	28%	5%	3%	1%	1%
2015 CP	56%	40%	∅	∅	∅	(Note: incl. in the 56% estimation for Tajik/Farsiwan.)
2015 NPS	62%	28%	5%	3%	2%	–
2011 PRT	56%	40% (Note: excl. Kochi.)	∅	∅	∅	(Note: incl. in the 56% estimation for Tajik/Farsiwan.)
2011 USA	62%	28%	5%	3%	–	–
2009 ISW	>50%	minority	–	–	–	–

Legend:
- ∅: Ethnicity mentioned in source but not quantified
- –: Ethnicity not mentioned specifically
- Source abbreviations: Empirical sources: –, Government sources: CP – Colombo Plan, EU – European Union Agency for Asylum, PRT – Provincial Reconstruction Team of the United States government, UN – United Nations Assistance Mission in Afghanistan, Editorial sources: ISW – Institute for the Study of War, NPS – Naval Postgraduate School, USA – United States Army.

=== Education ===
The educational infrastructure remains limited and unevenly distributed. Primary and secondary schools exist in most district centers and larger villages, but access in remote rural areas is often constrained by distance, poverty, and insecurity. School attendance is frequently affected by child labor, migration, and drought-related economic pressures. The province's main higher education institution, Badghis University, is located in Qala e Naw, along with teacher training and vocational programs serving students from across the province.

Since 2021, religious education through madrasas has expanded, especially in rural districts, providing Quranic instruction and basic literacy. Overall literacy rates remain low, especially among women, with the most recent available estimates from 2007 indicating an overall literacy rate of only 9.5%. While enrollment improved during the period of the Islamic Republic, educational participation has declined due to restrictions on female education since 2021.

=== Health ===
Healthcare services in Badghis are scarce and concentrated in urban centers. The main referral facility is the Qala-i-Naw District Hospital, which provides basic inpatient and outpatient services but has limited specialized capacity. District hospitals and health clinics offer primary care, maternal and child health services, vaccinations, and treatment for common illnesses. Many rural villages remain without permanent medical facilities and depend on mobile health teams, small health posts, or long-distance travel to district centers. Malnutrition, maternal and infant mortality, respiratory illnesses, and waterborne diseases remain among the most persistent health challenges, with the most recent available estimates from 2011 indicating that just 1% of births were attended by a skilled birth attendant.

Access to clean drinking water and sanitation is extremely limited in many districts, as the percentage of households with clean drinking water pending between 11.6% in 2005, 17% in 2007, and only 1% in 2011. Humanitarian organizations and international NGOs continue to provide essential medical support, nutrition programs, and emergency response, but the weak infrastructure and funding shortages frequently disrupt consistent service delivery.

== Culture ==
=== Music and dances ===
Music in Badghis reflects the province's cultural heritage, with strong influences from both northern and western Afghanistan and its Tajik, Pashtun, Uzbek, and Turkmen populations. Traditional folk music is widely performed at weddings, seasonal celebrations, and tribal gatherings. Like in the entire country, common instruments include the dambura, rubab, and various regional flutes, often accompanied by rhythmic hand clapping or frame drums.

Local vocal traditions consist of folk ballads, epic recitations, and improvised poetry, frequently addressing themes of migration, love, drought, and tribal life. Dance traditions include group circle dances and solo performances, usually performed during weddings and Nowruz celebrations.

=== Dress and attire ===
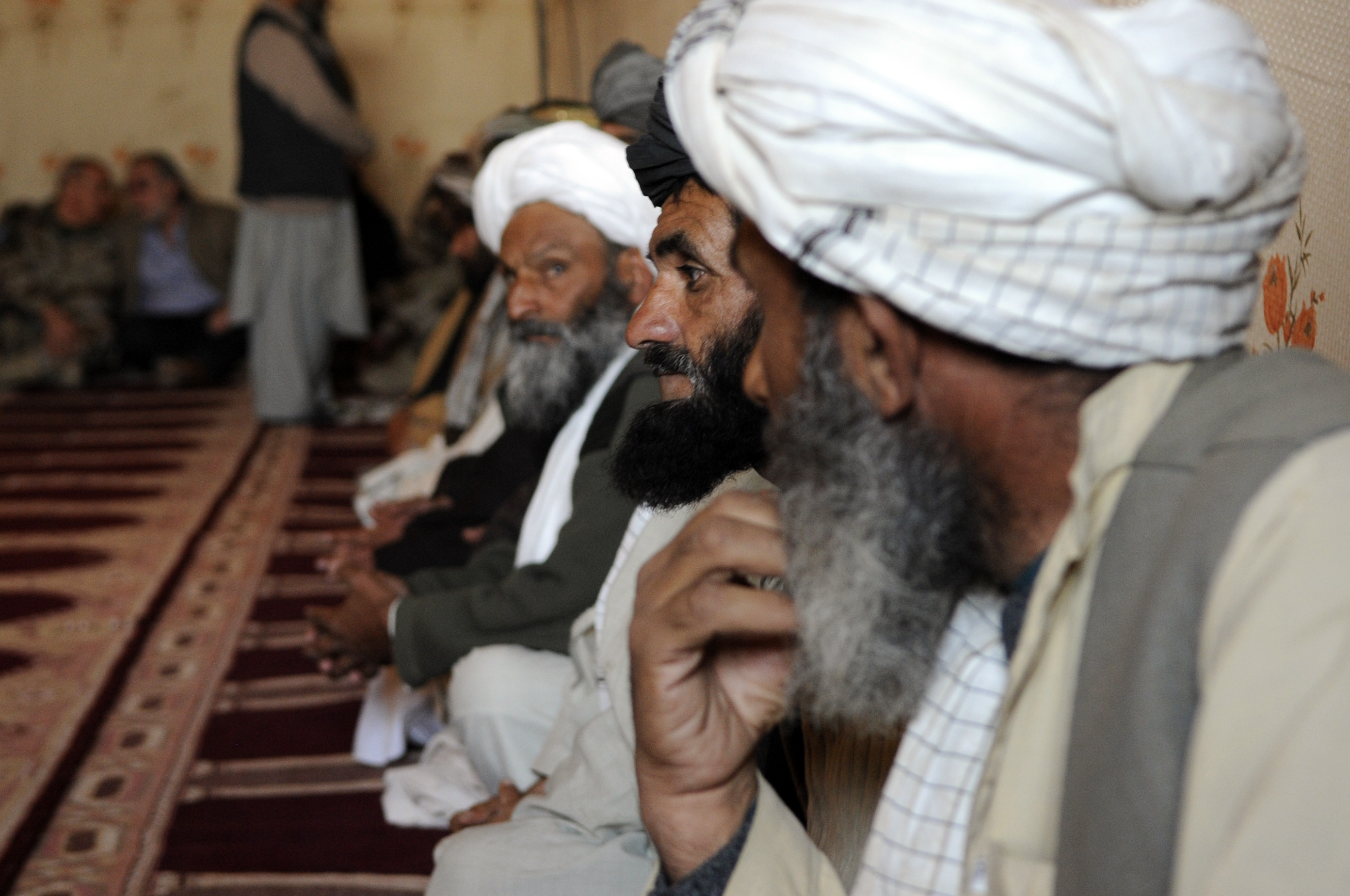
Elders of Bala Murghab, Badghis, in traditional perahan o tunban (2008)

Traditional clothing in Badghis reflects the steppe, rural, and pastoral lifestyle of its population. Men commonly wear perahan o tunban, often layered with woolen vests or chapans, particularly in winter. Headwear such as turbans, pakols, and embroidered caps is widespread. Women traditionally wear long, loose dresses with headscarves, often decorated with regional embroidery patterns, especially in Uzbek and Turkmen communities. In rural areas, traditional attire remains common in everyday life, while in towns it is more often worn during religious festivals, weddings, and family celebrations. Clothing styles also reflect practical adaptation to cold winters, strong winds, and dusty plains.

=== Cuisine ===
The cuisine of Badghis reflects the greater Afghan cuisine. Staple foods include naan, wheat-based dishes, rice, and pulses, accompanied by dairy products such as yogurt, qurut, and fresh milk. Meat, particularly lamb and goat, plays an important role in festive meals. Common dishes include palaw, qorma, kebab, and various stews prepared with onions, tomatoes, and dried herbs. Fruits such as apricots, mulberries, pomegranates, and grapes are consumed fresh or dried, while nuts such as almonds and walnuts are used as snacks and cooking ingredients. Tea, both green and black, is the primary everyday beverage and plays a central role in social hospitality.

=== Architecture, art, and literature ===
The traditional architecture in Badghis is closely adapted to the dry climate and open plains. Most rural houses are built from mudbrick, often with flat roofs and enclosed courtyards for protection from wind and heat. In colder upland districts, thicker walls provide insulation against winter temperatures. Mosques, shrines, and historic fortifications, especially near Bala Murghab, reflect the province's long history as a frontier region. Watchtowers and ruined forts remain visible reminders of earlier periods of insecurity and tribal defense. Local art traditions include embroidery, carpet weaving, felt work, and simple wood carving, often produced for household use rather than commercial markets. Literary traditions are predominantly oral, with storytelling, folk poetry, and religious recitations passed between generations. Dari and Pashto oral poetry both play important roles in transmitting moral values, tribal history, and social norms.

=== Media, entertainment, and festivities ===
Media access remains limited, especially outside the capital. Local radio stations serve as the primary source of news, religious programming, and public information, while television and internet services are mainly available in urban areas. Mobile phone usage is widespread, but internet speeds and connectivity remain weak in many districts. Traditional forms of entertainment dominate social life. Storytelling, music performances, poetry recitations, and communal gatherings remain central to leisure activities. Formal entertainment venues such as cinemas or theaters are largely absent. Nowruz is widely celebrated, along with Islamic holidays such as Eid al-Fitr and Eid al-Adha. Weddings, harvest celebrations, and tribal gatherings serve as major cultural events that bring together extended families and neighboring communities.

=== Places of interest ===
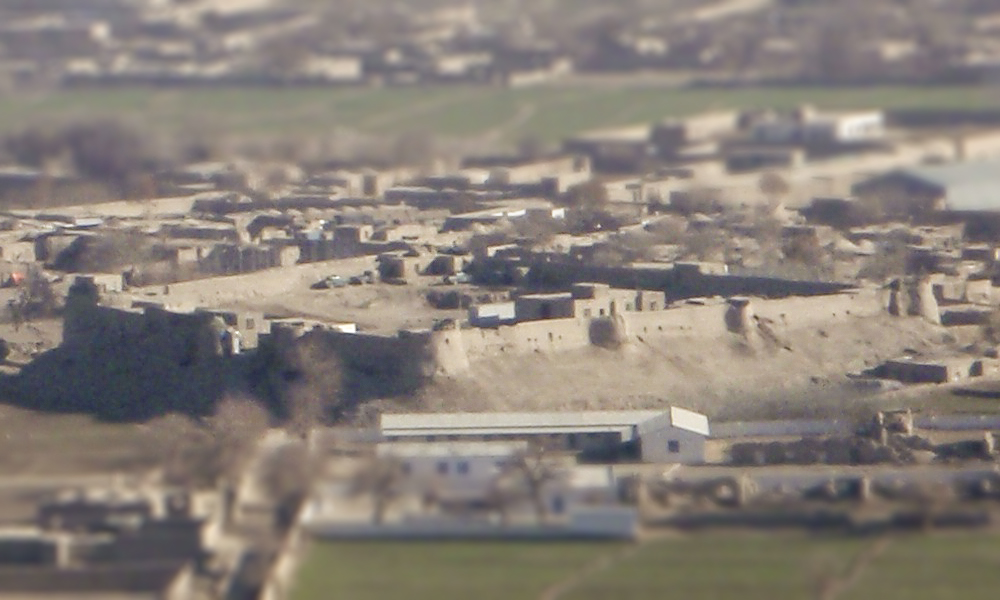
Ruins of Marw al-Rudh castle

Badghis contains a number of natural and historical sites, though most remain largely undeveloped for tourism. The Murghab River valley forms one of the most scenic landscapes in the province and supports many of its rural settlements. The ruins of the medieval city of Marw al-Rudh, near Bala Murghab, represent one of the most important archaeological sites in the province, reflecting its historical role in medieval Gharjistan and Greater Khorasan. Shrines, ancient fortifications, and traditional villages scattered across the province hold local religious and cultural significance.

=== Sports ===
Traditional physical activities in Badghis include horseback riding, which remains associated with both transport and recreation, as well as local wrestling and informal athletic competitions during festivals. Among modern sports, football and cricket are the most widely played and followed disciplines, particularly in urban areas. In the Shpageeza Cricket League, Badghis and other northwestern provinces are represented through the Hindukush Stars. During the period of the Islamic Republic, Toofan Harirod FC served as the regional football team representing Badghis together with Herat, Farah, and Ghor in the Afghan Premier League.

== See also ==
- Provinces of Afghanistan
