= Qarabaghi (Hazara tribe) =

Hazara tribe

Qarabaghi or Qara Baghi (Persian: قره‌باغی) is a Hazara tribe in Afghanistan and Pakistan, that originates from the Qarabagh district of Ghazni province in Afghanistan.

== Etymology ==
Qarabagh is a compound of the Turkic word qara or kara, meaning black, and the Persian word bagh, meaning garden, creating the compound meaning of 'black garden'. It is cognate to the Azeri word Qarabağ ([ɡɑˈɾɑbɑɣ]), as in the Karabakh region of the Lesser Caucasus.

== Geographic distribution ==
Most Qarabaghi live in and originate from the aforementioned Qarabagh District of Ghazni Province. The Qarabaghi are one of the major Hazara tribes in the city of Quetta, along with the Dai Zangi, Uruzgani, and Maska. The Qarabaghi mainly reside in the Nauabad locale, with a minority living in the Mari Abad and Hazara Town areas. There is also a Qarabaghi minority in Australia and Indonesia, as well as other countries that the Hazara reside in.

== Relations with the Taliban ==
The Qarabaghi tribe is notable for its close relations with the Taliban, which arose due to their close proximity to the Sunni Pashtun population surrounding them, with which they even intermarry. The tribe has joint security initiatives with the Taliban, and a number of its members became Taliban fighters, participating in the Taliban insurgency.

== See also ==
- Qarabagh District
- List of Hazara tribes
