= Dai Khitai (Hazara tribe) =

Tribe of Hazara people

The Dai Khitai (Dari: دای ختای) are a tribe of Hazara people in Afghanistan.

== Origin ==
Regardless of their position among the major groupings, the Dai Khitai are often seen as coming together with the Dai Chopan tribe to form the larger Uruzgani Hazara tribe.

== See also ==
- List of Hazara tribes
- Hazara people
- Dai Chopan
