= Bache Ghulam =

Hazara tribe

The Bache Ghulam, (Dari: بچه غلام), is a tribe of Hazara people, largely found in Sangi Takht District of Daykundi Province, Afghanistan. They are a subtribe of the Daizangi.

== Etymology ==
Bache Ghulam seems to mean "son of the manor".

== Sub-tribes ==
- Bubak
- Gaoshak
- Ghulam Ali
- Ismail
- Kaum-i-Barfi
- Kaum-i-Mizra
- Kaum-i-Yari
- Neka
- Shah Masid
- Waras

== See also ==
- List of Hazara tribes

== Sources ==
- Dai Kundi Province:Program for Culture and Conflict Studies, (US) Naval Postgraduate School.
