= List of Hazara tribes =

The Hazaras are an ethnic group dispersed throughout Afghanistan, with sizable communities in cities such as Quetta, Pakistan, and Mashhad, Iran, as well as in other regions globally.

The Hazara people are composed of several major tribes. Some of the most prominent Hazara tribes include Sheikh Ali, Jaghori, Jaghatu, Qara Baghi, Muhammad Khwaja, Behsudi, Dai Mirdad, Turkmun, Uruzgani, Dai Kundi, Dai Zangi, Dai Chopan, Dai Zinyat, Qarlugh, and Aimaq Hazara, among others. These tribes trace their origins to Hazaristan, a region that includes areas such as Bamyan, Ghor, Ghazni, Orozgan, Daikundi, Maidan Wardak, Parwan, Balkh, and more. Today, Hazara communities are dispersed across Afghanistan, parts of Pakistan and Iran, as well as other regions with significant Hazara populations.

== Tribes ==
English name	Hazaragi name	Tribal structure	Origin
Ahmada	احمدا		
Aludani	علاءالدینی (علودانی)		
Alchin	الچین		Alchi Tatars
Aimaq Hazara	ایماق هزاره		
Attarwala	عطارواله		
Bache Ghulam	بچه غلام		
Barlas	برلاس		Barlas
Behsudi	بهسودی		
Dahla	داهله		
Dai Berka	دای‌برکه		
Dai Chopan	دای‌چوپان	Uruzgani	Zabulistan
Dai Kalan	دای‌کلان		
Dai Khitai	دای‌خیتای	Uruzgani	Qara Khitai
Dai Kundi	دای‌کندی		
Dai Mirak	دای‌میرک		
Dai Mirdad	دای‌میرداد		
Dai Quzi	دای‌قوزی		
Dai Zangi	دای‌زنگی		"Zangi" is a common name amongst the Turkic people of Central Asia.
Dai Zinyat	دای‌زینیات		
Darghu	دارغو		Uruzgan and Kandahar
Ghaznichi/Hazara of Ghazni	غزنیچی		
Jaghatu	جغتو		
Jaghori	جاغوری		
Jalair	جلایر		Jalair
Jamshidi	جمشیدی		Aimaq people
Jirghai	جیرغی		
Kalougi	کالوگی		
Kirigu	کیریگو	Daizangi	
Khalaj	خلج		Khalaj
Khalaut	کالو		
Maska	مسکه	Jaghori	
Muhammad Khwaja	محمد خواجه		Barlas
Naiman	نایمان		Naiman
Nekpai	نیکپای		
Nikudari	نیکودری		
Dai Folad/ Foladi/ Poladha/ Poladi	دای‌فولاد		
Pashi	پشی	Jaghori	
Qalandar	قلندر	Jaghori	
Qara Baghi	قره‌باغی		
Batur	باتور		
Qarlugh/Qarluq	قرلق		Qarluqs, Qarlughids
Karkin	کرکین		Qarqin
Qataghan	قطغن		Katagans, Qataghan
Qipchaq	قیپچاق		Kipchak
Qul Bars	قول برس		Dervived from Turkic and Mongolic word "bars", meaning "leopard"
Sakaei			
Sarcheshmaie	سرچشمه‌ای		
Sheikh Ali	شیخ‌علی	Dai Kalan	
Shibargi	شیبرگی		
Shirdagh	شیرداغ		
Sultan Masudi	سلطان مسعودی		See (Campaign against Sultan Masudi Hazaras)
Tamaki	تمکی		
Tatar	تاتار		Tatars
Taimuri	تیموری		
Tughai Bugha	توغای بوگا	Jaghori	Butai Beig, the Timurid commander
Tumai	تومی		
Turkmani/Turkmun	تُرکمنی (تورکمون)	Dai Kalan	
Turkan/Turgan	تُرکان (تورگان)		
Uruzgani	ارزگانی		
Woqi	وقی		

== See also ==
- List of Hazara people
