= Maska (Hazara tribe) =

Subtribe of Jaghori Hazara people

The Maska are a tribe of the Hazara people in Afghanistan and neighboring countries. Maska is a sub-tribe of the Jaghori tribe of Hazaras in Afghanistan.

== Origin ==
For a long time ago Maska and Babah were twin brothers and according to an old myth, they were separated by knife. In Afghanistan, their ancestral place is Sange-e-Masha in the Jaghori District of Ghazni Province. The Maska are known for practicing endogamy and not marrying outside their tribe, which leads to the Maska retaining Asian facial features more than other tribes.

== Subclans of Maska ==
- Aaka
- Akhka
- Aldiyaar
- Alumbaig
- Daama
- Dada
- Faquiro
- Ikhtiar
- Jamag
- Mehtar
- Naib
- Nouta
- Ourdu
- Paidga
- Pashumbee
- Rozee
- Shadi
- Shah Dost
- Wakil
- Yaree
