= Sakaei (Hazara tribe) =

Major Hazara tribe

Sakai / Muska
Sakai Hazara

Regions with significant populations
- Afghanistan

Languages
- Persian

Religion
- Islam

Related ethnic groups
- Hazaras, Scythians (historical association)

Sakaei/Maska is one of the ancient tribes among the Hazara people in Afghanistan. The historical origins of this tribe are attributed to the ancient Scythians. The Sakai/Muska people have lived in various regions of Afghanistan, especially in Hazarajat, and are considered among the indigenous and long-established groups of this region.

== Historical background ==
The Scythians are generally regarded as an ancient Iranian-speaking people who were spread from Central Asia to the Iranian Plateau. However, alternative theories also exist that associate them with Turkic-speaking Scythian groups or the Huns. Within this framework, the Sakai/Muska tribe among the Hazara people is considered a remnant or a branch attributed to these ancient peoples.

== Geographical distribution ==
The Sakaei/Maska have resided in various regions of Afghanistan. In addition, their presence has been reported in other central areas of Hazarajat. The long history of settlement of this tribe in these areas places them among the indigenous groups of the region.

== Tribal structure ==
The Maska (مسکه / Muska) tribe, as one of the main branches of the Sakai, historically consisted of several sub-tribes. According to local oral traditions, this tribe once comprised thirteen branches, which today are grouped into divisions such as Baba, Aza, Darwish, and Aka.

== Language and religion ==
The common language spoken among the Sakai/Muska is Dari Persian. Religiously, they predominantly follow Sunni Islam and Shia Islam.

== Position within Hazara society ==
The presence of the Sakai/Muska tribe reflects the tribal diversity and multi-layered historical background within the social structure of the Hazara people. Like other Hazara clans, this tribe has played a role in shaping the historical and social identity of Hazarajat.

== Notable individuals ==
- Mohammad Yunus Tughyan Sakaei

== See also ==
- Hazara people
- Hazarajat
- Scythians
