= Daizinyat =

Tribe of Hazara people

Daizinyat also spelled as Dai Zinyat (Dari: دای زینات) is a tribe of Hazaras in Afghanistan, who live mainly in the Qala e Naw region of Badghis province, located the east of Darya'e Kas (Kas river).

== Background ==
It is a famous fort and place that this tribe lived in and one of the populated areas of Badghis. They were established by Nadir Shah Afshar and belong to the Daizangi tribe of Hazaras, most probably from the Ghor region. One of their elders, Sardar Hussain Khan, was appointed the governor of Herat by Nasir Shah. They live in and around the Dara'e Ab Kaka, Ab Mohra and surrounding Qala'e Naw, and are also called Hazara-i-Qala e Nau. They profess Sunni Islam, in contrast to the mainly Shia Hazaras of Hazarajat.

== See also ==
- List of Hazara tribes
