= Qalandar (Hazara tribe) =

The Qalandar (Dari: قلندر) are a tribe of Hazara people found in Afghanistan.

== Background ==
In the reports of the Afghan Boundary Commission in 1891, Lieutenant-Colonel Maitland, a member of the mission in Afghanistan, identified the Qalandar as falling within a similar area as the Jaghori Hazaras (Ghazni Province and the upper Arghandab Valley), but "not directly affiliated" and of different origin.

== Origin ==
The Qalandar are believed to be late-19th-century refugees from Day Chopan and Arjestan.

== Distribution ==
Most of the Qalandar are in Quetta, Balochistan.The tribe is divided into two areas: Alamdar Road and Hazara Town in Alamdar Road the head of the tribe is Babu Omid Ali (a government servant) and in Hazara town, the tribe leader is Haji Mullah Sammad (former government servant) now a local pipe shop owner.

== See also ==
- List of Hazara tribes
