= Nikpai =

Nikpai may refer to:

- Negübei, the khan of the Chagatai Mongols from 1270-1272 AD
- Nikpai tribe, a tribe of the Hazara people of Afghanistan
