= Uruzgani (Hazara tribe) =

The Uruzgani (Persian: ارزگانی) are one of the major tribes of the Hazara people. They mainly inhabit the Uruzgan province and the present-day Daykundi province. A 1965 work describes them as "sedentary agriculturalists... speak[ing] Hazaraghi."

== History ==
The Battle of Uruzgan was fought between Hazaras and Afghans there in 1893. Thereafter, on Hazara's defeat, the Uruzganis were uprooted from Uruzgan by Abdur Rahman and Afghan tribes were resettled in Uruzgan. They mostly migrated to Iran and British India (Quetta). In 1900, Habibullah Khan granted amnesty to Hazaras and asked them to return. Some returning Uruzganis were then resettled in Turkistan and Balkh but were not allowed to return to Uruzgan.

== Legacy ==
Today all the district names in Uruzgan bears the testimony that this was a Hazara land. Tarinkot, Chore, Zuli, Khas Uruzgan are all Hazara words and are some of the original Uruzgani tribes. Dai Chopan is also a sub tribe of Uruzganis and the district with the same name is in Zabul province. Daichopan are the descendants of Amir Chopan, a Hazara chieftain and whose grave is at Grishk, Helamand province. Hazaras are emotionally attached to Uruzgan, because of the battle of Uruzgan. Even today it is on the agenda of all the Hazaras and Hazara political entities that the question of Uruzgan has to be settled.

== See also ==
- List of Hazara tribes
- Daikundi (Hazara tribe)
