= Mohammad Khawaja =

Mohammad Khawaja may refer to:

- Momin Khawaja (born 1979), Canadian criminal
- Khawaja Junaid (born 1966), Pakistani field hockey coach
- Mohamed Khouaja, Libyan sprinter
- Muhammad Khwaja, Hazara tribe
