= Pashi (Hazara tribe) =

The Pashi (Dari: پَشی) are a tribe of Hazara people in Afghanistan they mainly inhabit in Jaghori, Malistan and Urozak khas districts. Some of the clans a part of the Pashi are Chihilbaghtoie Pashi, Jaka-Pashi, Qabjoi, Pai Julga, Shab Bakhair, Nawe-Pashi, Payik, Ulyad, Dadi, Zingar and Daybirka.

== See also ==
- List of Hazara tribes
