= Daikundi (Hazara tribe) =

Daikundi, also spelled as Dai Kundi, (Dari: دایکندی) is one of the major tribes of Hazara people in Afghanistan mostly in Hazaristan (Hazarajat) region.

== Geographical distribution ==
They live in Daikundi Province and the Lal Wa Sarjangal, Chaghcharan, Dawlatabad, Charsadda, and Pasaband districts of Ghor Province. Daikundi Hazaras remained secluded and unhinged from the devastation and the resulting uprooting of different Hazara tribes, after the Battle of Uruzgan.

The Daikundi have traditionally been very closely allied with the Daizangi.

== Subclans ==
Subsets of the Daikundi include the Ainak, Alak, Babuli, Baibagh, Barat, Bubak, Chahkuk, Chahush, Chora, Dawlat Beg, Doda, Fihristan, Haider Beg, Jami, Jasha, Kalanzai, Kaum-i-Ali, Khudi, Khushak, Mamaka, Mir Hazar, Neka, Roshan Beg, and Saru.

== Background ==
Daikundi Province was created from the upper half of the Uruzgan Province of Afghanistan in 2004. It partially fulfilled the Hazara demand that their land is restored to them. The Hazaras were uprooted from Uruzgan after the 1893 Battle of Uruzgan, and the Pashtun tribes were settled on their land.

== See also ==
- List of Hazara tribes
