= Dey Chopan District =

District of Zabul Province, Afghanistan

Daichopan دای چوپان
- District
- Location within Afghanistan
- Country: Afghanistan
- Province: Zabul

Dey Chopan (Pashto: دای چوپان), also spelled Dai chopan, is the northernmost district in Zabul province, Afghanistan. Named after a Hazara clan, the district historically belonged to the Hazaras, which was then invaded and depopulated by Emir Abdur Rahman in the 1890's. In 2013, it had a population of about 38,300.

The district’s people are the Tokhi tribe of Ghilji Pashtuns and the Noorzai tribe of Durrani Pashtuns.

== See also ==
- Districts of Afghanistan
- Dai Chopan (Hazara tribe)
