= Jaghatu (Hazara tribe) =

Major tribe of Hazara people

Jaghatu (Dari: جغتو) is a major tribe of Hazara people in Afghanistan, who originates from Jaghatu District of Ghazni Province.

== Etymology ==
The name Jaghatu is derived from the Turkic word of Jaghatai.

== See also ==
- Jaghatu District
- List of Hazara tribes
