= Aludani (Hazara tribe) =

Aludāni / علودانی

Regions with significant populations
- Afghanistan (especially Ghazni, Maidan Wardak, Bamyan, Daikundi)

Languages
- Hazaragi

Religion
- Islam (Twelver Shia)

Related ethnic groups
- Hazaras, other Behsud tribes, Jaghori, Batur

Aludani (Dari: علودانی, IPA: /æluːdɒːniː/), also known as Ala al-Dini (Dari: علاء الدینی, IPA: /ælɑː æl diːniː/), is a tribe of the Hazara people in Afghanistan, primarily residing in the provinces of Ghazni, Maidan Wardak, Bamyan, and Daikundi. According to historical and oral accounts, members of this clan are descendants of Sultan Ala al-Din Husayn Jahansuz, a notable king of the Ghurid dynasty who ruled large parts of Khorasan, Afghanistan, and India in the 6th century AH (12th century CE).

Aludanis have traditionally lived in the mountainous and remote regions of Hazarajat. Like other Hazara clans, they maintain a traditional social structure based on kinship ties and local councils. Their cultural identity, Hazaragi language, adherence to Twelver Shia Islam, and participation in regional sociopolitical developments are distinctive features of the clan.

== Geography ==
The Aludani clan mainly resides in central Afghanistan, including Nawur District and Jaghori in Ghazni, parts of Behsud in Maidan Wardak, Yakawlang District in Bamyan, and Miramor in Daikundi. Most of the population lives in mountainous and cold regions of Hazarajat, characterized by rural settlements, limited agriculture, and cohesive tribal structures.

Certain villages and areas in Nawur, such as the "Aludani area," are named after this clan and form a significant part of the Hazara social and cultural network. Proximity to other Behsud clans, including Batur and Fouladi, has fostered cultural interaction and kinship ties between these groups.

== Origins and History ==
The Aludani clan is considered one of the ancient and reputable Hazara clans, tracing their lineage to Sultan Ala al-Din Husayn Jahansuz, a prominent king of the Ghurid dynasty. Ala al-Din Husayn ruled parts of central Afghanistan in the 6th century AH (12th century CE) and is historically known as "Jahansuz" for his military campaigns and conquests.

The name "Aludani" derives from combining "Ala al-Din" with the relational suffix "-ani," literally meaning "related to Ala al-Din." This naming reflects either a bloodline or cultural affiliation with the Ghurid family, although limited official documentation exists. Nevertheless, oral traditions and clan narratives emphasize this connection, which is regarded as part of their historical identity.

The Ghurids' role in developing Islamic civilization in Greater Khorasan, spreading the Persian language, and constructing monuments like the Minaret of Jam has given clans associated with this dynasty a significant cultural and historical place in collective memory of Hazarajat.

Like many Hazara clans, the Aludanis were dispersed following political repression and forced migrations under Abdul Rahman Khan and settled across various regions of Hazarajat, including Nawur, Jaghori, Behsud, Bamyan, and Daikundi. They maintain a social structure based on local councils and tribal systems, preserving their identity through ancestral lineage, religion, and the Hazaragi language.

== Language and Religion ==
The Aludani speak Hazaragi, a Persian dialect with lexical influences from Turkic languages, widely spoken in central Afghanistan (Hazarajat). Their dialect aligns with that of Nawur, Jaghori, and Behsud.

Religiously, the Aludanis follow Twelver Shia Islam, which is the majority sect among Afghan Hazaras. Their religious beliefs play a central role in social structure, local rituals, and communal solidarity. Religious ceremonies such as Ashura, Arbaeen, and other commemorative gatherings are widely observed.
