= Tanzeem Nasle Nau Hazara =

- Formation: 1965
- Type: Welfare Organization
- Headquarters: Quetta, Pakistan
- Location: Pakistan
- Official language: Hazaragi
- Website: http://tanzeemwelfare.org/

Tanzeem Nasle Nau Hazara is a welfare organization based in Quetta, Pakistan working for the welfare of Hazara people since 1965.

== History ==
Tanzeem as a social organization providing education. Tanzeem commits itself to carryout all these activities through its NGO-based struggle without any discrimination of cast, creed, colors and religion.

In 1965, a group of Hazara youth started their efforts to establish a community-based organization, with its office set in a small rented room. With the passage of time

- 1965 Beginning of struggle by laying foundation through sports activity, literacy classes for illiterate, adult and children.
- 1971 Registration of Tanzeem Nasle Nau Hazara under the societies Act XXI of 1860.
- 1985 Establishment of formal school by the name of Tameer Nasle Nau High School.
- 1990 English language center for girls and boys.
- 1997 Tanzeem Welfare Society registered under voluntary social welfare agencies ordinance 1961(XLVI of 1961).
