= Sultan Masudi =

Sultan Masudi (Persian: سلطان مسعودی) was a tribe of the Hazaras.

== History ==
According to Babur, the founder of the Mughal Empire in the 16th century, in Baburnama, the Hazaras of Sultan Masudi, along with the Hazaras of the village, Lachin, and Qarluq, are the largest tribes of the Hazara people.

This tribe was exterminated by Babur and largely destroyed during the reign of Abdur Rahman in the 19th century, so that today no trace of them remains.

== See also ==
- List of Hazara tribes
- Campaign against Sultan Masudi Hazaras

== Other sources ==
- Bāburnāma. By Zahir ud-din Muhammad Babur
- The Hazāras. By Hassan Poladi
