= Nekpai (Hazara tribe) =

Hazara tribe in Badakhshan province

The Nekpai (Dari: نیکپای) are a Hazara tribe in Badakhshan Province, Afghanistan.

== See also ==
- List of Hazara tribes
