= Ghulam Husain Naseri =

Afghan politician

Ghulam Husain Naseri غلام‌حسین ناصری

Afghanistan Parliament

Personal details
- Born: 1959 (age 66–67) Behsud, Maidan Wardak, Afghanistan
- Occupation: Politician
- Ethnicity: Hazara

Ghulam Husain Naseri (Dari: غلام‌حسین ناصری) is an ethnic Hazara politician in Afghanistan. He is the former representative of the people of Maidan Wardak during the 16th term of Afghanistan Parliament.

== Early life ==
Ghulam Husain Naseri was born in Behsud district of Maidan Wardak province in 1959. Nasseri began his elementary education in Behsud primary school. Then he went to Kabul and completed his secondary education and in 1971 graduated from Ghazi High School. In 2007, Naseri obtained his undergraduate degree in Islamic Law and Islamic Philosophy from Al-Mustafa International University in Qom, Iran and paid for other religious studies as well.
