= Dai Mirdad (Hazara tribe) =

Hazara tribe in Samangan, Afghanistan

The Dai Mirdad (Dari: دایمیرداد) or Dai Mirdadi (دایمیردادی) is a tribe of ethnic Hazaras in Afghanistan.

== See also ==
- List of Hazara tribes
- Day Mirdad District
