= Jaghori (Hazara tribe) =

Hazara tribe

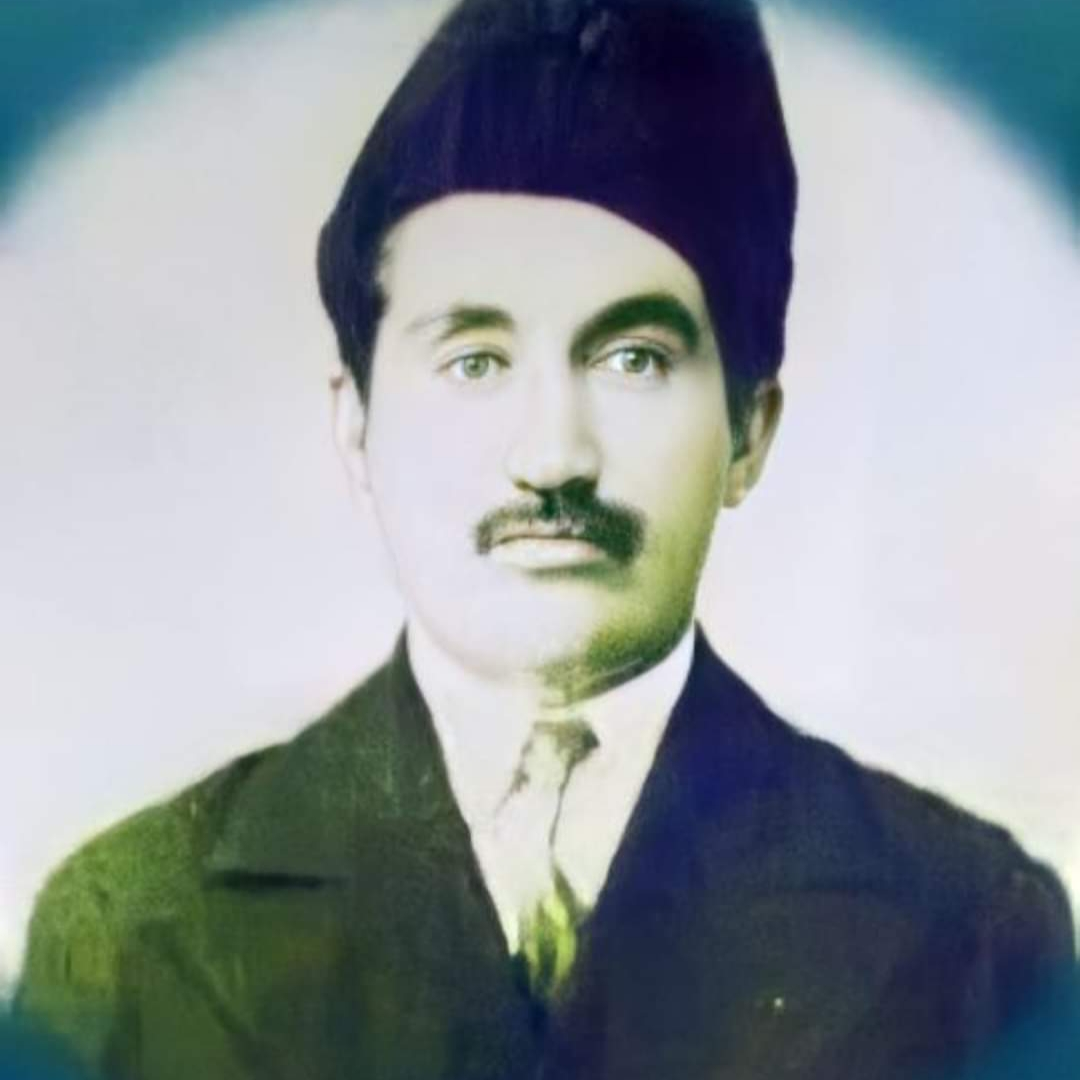
Abdullah Khan, was a Hazara chief of the Jaghori tribe in Jaghori, Ghazni.

Jaghori (Persian: جاغوری) is a major tribe of the Hazara people in Afghanistan. The tribe primarily originates from and resides in the Jaghori District of Ghazni Province. In addition to their presence in Afghanistan, many Jaghoris have settled in Pakistan, particularly in Quetta, where they form the majority of the Hazara population in neighborhoods such as Hazara Town and Mariabad. The Jaghori tribe was among the earliest Hazara groups to settle in Quetta, playing a key role in establishing and developing the local Hazara community.

== Divisions ==
Hazara researcher Muhammad Isa Gharjistani identified the major branches of the Jaghori in 1989: the Baighani (or Ata), Yazdari (Ezdari), Baghocari, and the Oqi from which General Musa Khan is from.

== History ==
The Jaghori Hazaras mentioned in records from 1881 CE as being led by Chief Safdar Ali. It was noted that they had received a khillit (a robe of honor) and had been conciliated by the Afghan Amir Abdur Rahman.

== Notables ==
- Yazdan Khan, british Indian Army officer
- General Musa Khan, pakistan Army's 4th Commander-in-Chief
- Muhammad al-Fayadh, senior marja from Afghanistan
- Akram Yari, founder of the Progressive Youth Organization
- Sima Samar, human rights advocate
- Shah Gul Rezai, human rights activist
- Younus Changezi, former footballer, army officer, and politician
- Mohsin Changezi, Urdu poet
- Rahmat Akbari, football Player
- Nila Ibrahimi, women's and girls' rights activist, high school student, and singer

== See also ==
- List of Hazara tribes
