= Muhammad Khwaja =

Major Hazara tribe

Hazara of Muhammad Khwaja هزاره محمد خواجه Muhammad Khwaja محمد خواجه
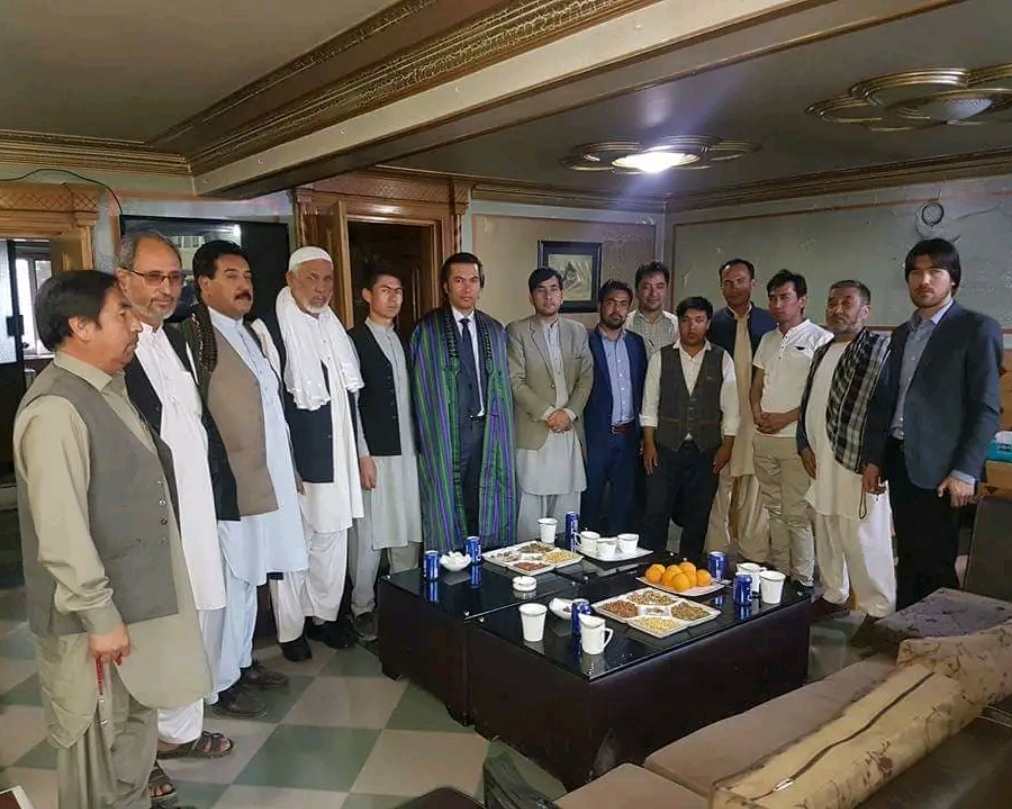
- Hazara men of Muhammad Khwaja tribe
- Ethnicity: Hazaras
- Location: Previously Kesh (Uzbekistan), Iran, Hindustan; Currently Afghanistan
- Descended from: Barlas
- Religion: Islam

Emir Muhammad Khwaja امیر محمد خواجه
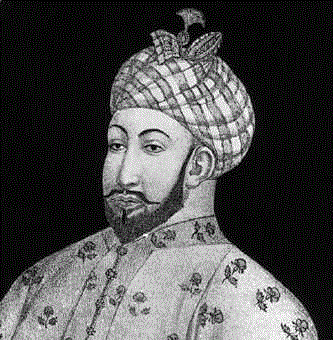
- Emir Muhammad Khwaja
- Born: Kesh present day Uzbekistan
- Died: 1599; Sharan present day Afghanistan
- Predecessor: Darwish Muhammad
- Successor: Khwaja Baqi Billah

The Hazāra of Muhammad Khwāja (Persian: هزارهٔ محمد خواجه) is one of the major tribes of the ethnic Hazara people, primarily originating from and residing in Ghazni, Afghanistan.

== Origin ==
The Hazaras of Muhammad Khwaja belong to the Turko-Mongol or Turkic confederation of the Barlas, who until the sixteenth century spoke the Chagatai language, a Turkic language of the Karluk branch.

== Emir Muhammad Khwaja ==
Emir Muhammad Khwaja (Persian: امیر محمد خواجه) belonged to the Timurid Barlas confederation. His ancestral homeland is Kesh, Turkistan in present day Uzbekistan. Emir Muhammad Khwaja was the son of Emir Haji Saifuddin who was a wazir of Timur in the beginning and later became governor of Qandahar now in Afghanistan. His great-grandfather, Haji Beig Barlas, was the leader of Barlas, who overthrew Qara'unas Abdullah from power in southern Chagatai Khanate. Abdullah, who had recently taken power, was young and inexperienced, and his move to Kesh threatened Haji Beig Barlas.

Emir, Khan, Beig, Mirza, Sheikh, Shah, Ghazi, and Sultan are titles to his tribes and descendants to date.

Emir Muhammad Khwaja was the commander in chief of the army of Babur. He is well known as "Khwaja-e bozorg" (the great Khwaja). His names appears in many historical script including Baburnama.

Emir Muhammad Khwaja served as commander in chief of Babur’s army during his struggle to capture Delhi in each battle, including the last one in Panipat. Emir preferred the continental weather in central Asia and could never adjust to the hot weather of Delhi. It has been recorded that Emir lived in Sharan now in Paktika, Afghanistan and many of his descendants scattered from there to other parts of the country. Emir Muhammad Khwaja died on 1599 in Sharan, Paktia and was buried there.

== List of notable Hazara of Muhammad Khwaja ==
- Faiz Muhammad Kateb, a distinguished historian and calligrapher who served as the Afghan court chronicler and secretary to Habibullah Khan from 1901 to 1919.
- Sardar Muhammad Azim Khan
- Noor Muhammad Khan Hazara
- Abdul Wahed Sarābi
- Habiba Sarābi
- Ramazan Bashardost
- Aziz Royesh

== See also ==
- List of Hazara tribes

== Sources ==
- Poladi, Hassan (1989). The Hazāras. Mughal Publishing Company. ISBN 978-0-929824-00-0.
- Babur, Zahir-ud-din Muhammad (1826). Memoirs of Zahir-ud-din Muhammad Babur, Emperor of Hindustan. Longman.
