= Mohammad Yunus Tughyan Sakaei =

Afghan literary scholar (1956–2025)

- Born: 1956 (1335 Solar Hijri); Afghanistan
- Died: 2025 (12 Mizan 1404 Solar Hijri); California, United States
- Education: Kabul University
- Alma mater: Kabul
- Occupations: University professor, literary researcher, Shahnameh scholar
- Known for: Research on the Shahnameh and Persian epic literature

Mohammad Yunus Tughyan Sakaei (born 1956–2025; 1335 Solar Hijri, Andarab, Baghlan Province, Afghanistan – died 12 Mizan 1404 Solar Hijri, California, United States) was a literary figure, Shahnameh scholar, former professor at Kabul University and Balkh University, and one of Afghanistan’s well-known academic and cultural personalities. In the course of his literary research—particularly in the field of epic literature and Shahnameh studies—he authored important books and articles that left a lasting impact on the literary and cultural richness of Afghanistan.

In addition to his academic activities, Tughyan Sakaei was an influential figure within the Sunni Hazara community of Afghanistan and played an effective role in the founding of the National Council of Sunni Hazaras of Afghanistan.

== Life ==
Mohammad Yunus Tughyan Sakaei was born in Andarab District, Baghlan Province, in northeastern Afghanistan. He completed his primary and secondary education in his birthplace and then moved to Kabul to continue his studies. He was admitted to Kabul University in the field of Persian Language and Literature (1979–1982) and later continued his education in the same discipline up to the master’s level (1987–1989). During his student years, due to his strong interest in classical Persian texts—especially Ferdowsi’s Shahnameh—he carried out extensive studies in the field of epic literature.

After graduating, he was employed as a faculty member in the Faculty of Language and Literature at Kabul University and taught courses related to the history of Persian literature, stylistics, and Shahnameh studies there from 1982 to 1993, and subsequently at Balkh University from 1993 to 1999.

Sakaei also cooperated for a period with BBC Persian Radio, the Afghanistan Independent Human Rights Commission, and the Ministry of Higher Education of Afghanistan.

=== Studies in Tajikistan ===
In the continuation of his academic activities, Tughyan Sakaei traveled to the Republic of Tajikistan in 2012 to pursue higher education. He began his doctoral studies in Persian Language and Literature at Tajik National University in Dushanbe, where he wrote his doctoral dissertation focusing on epic structures in Ferdowsi’s Shahnameh and successfully obtained his PhD degree in 2016.

Studying in Tajikistan enabled him to become acquainted with Persian literary sources in Central Asia, including manuscript collections preserved in Tajik libraries, and to expand the scope of his research. During this period, he engaged in academic collaboration with a number of Tajik and Iranian researchers and participated in regional literary conferences.

After returning to Afghanistan, Tughyan Sakaei continued his academic activities and taught at Kabul University from 2016 to 2021. He was active in Afghanistan’s higher education system for more than three decades and played a role in educating multiple generations of students. His field of specialization was epic literature, particularly Ferdowsi’s Shahnameh, and he published numerous articles and studies in this area. He also participated in cultural programs, academic gatherings, and literary conferences both inside and outside the country.

=== Participation in the founding of the National Council of Sunni Hazaras of Afghanistan ===
Mohammad Yunus Tughyan Sakaei was one of the influential figures in the formation of the National Council of Sunni Hazaras of Afghanistan. Given his academic background and cultural standing, he was among the first individuals to raise the necessity of establishing an independent institution for the political and social representation of Sunni Hazaras.

During the early stages of the council’s formation, Tughyan Sakaei played an active role in drafting its objectives, structure, and foundational statements and was regarded as a prominent advocate for the participation of this group in national decision-making processes. In his speeches and writings, he emphasized the necessity of separating ethnic identity from religious affiliation and believed that Sunni Hazaras should also have a place in defining the collective Hazara identity. His participation in establishing this council reflected his broader efforts to strengthen intra-ethnic cohesion and to oppose religious monopolization within Afghanistan’s ethnic representative structures.

=== Migration to the United States ===
Following the political developments in Afghanistan in 2021 and the return of the Taliban to power, Tughyan Sakaei left the country and migrated to the United States. He settled in the state of California, where he continued his academic and cultural activities. Mohammad Yunus Tughyan Sakaei passed away in Mehr 1404 Solar Hijri (October 2025) at approximately 68 years of age. News of his death was met with reactions from Afghanistan’s academic and cultural community.

== Works ==
=== Books ===
- On Understanding Ferdowsi and the Shahnameh
- The Families of Godarz and Piran in the Shahnameh; Iran: Al-Huda Publishing, 2009.
- History of Persian (Dari) Literature in the Seventh and Eighth Hijri Centuries
- History of Persian Literature in the Ninth and Tenth Hijri Centuries
- Steps Toward the Lofty Palace, Kabul: Saeed Publishing, 2010.
- Nazm-e Dorr-e Dari
- Historical Texts for Master’s Degree Programs
- The City of My Dreams: Kabul (which some sources consider to be his final published work).
- Tak Publications (Kabul) has announced that a six-volume collection entitled Haft-Khan, authored by Tughyan Sakaei and focusing on the Shahnameh and Ferdowsi, will be published in the near future.

=== Articles ===
1. “The Myth of the White Div and Mazandaran,” Pazh Journal, Spring 1999, Issue 1, pp. 167–174.
2. “Gava, the Land of the Gavians,” Contemporary Literature Journal, Kabul, Andisha Foundation, Issues 8–9, Autumn and Winter 2017.
