= Dai Chopan (Hazara tribe) =

Tribe

The Dai Chopan (Dari: دایچوپان) is a tribe of Hazaras in Afghanistan. the district with the same name Dai Chopan in Zabul province is derived from this tribe.

== Origin ==
The Dai Chopan are the descendants of Amir Chopan, a Hazara chieftain and whose grave is at Grishk, Helmand Province.

== See also ==
- List of Hazara tribes
