= Daizangi (Hazara tribe) =

Major tribe of Hazara people

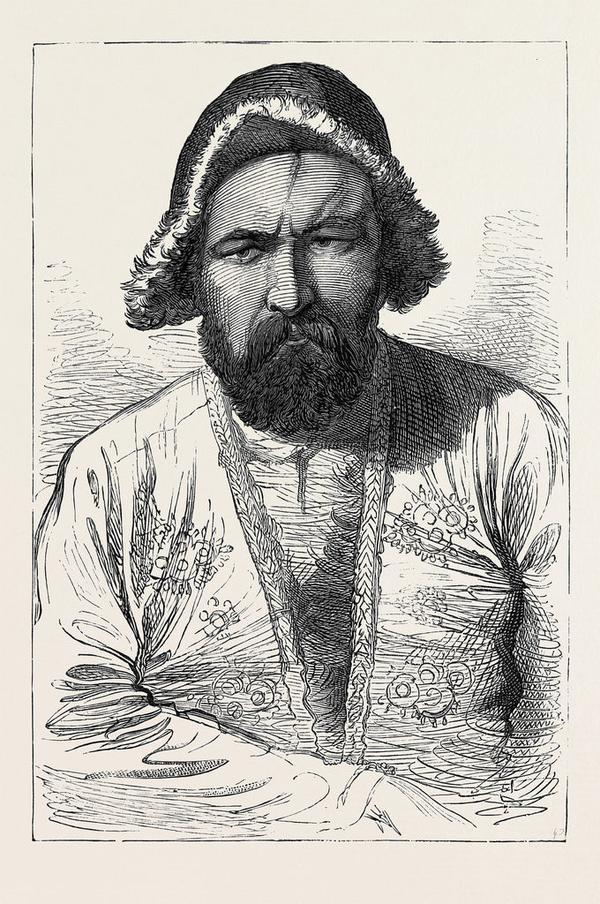
An 1879 portrait of a Daizangi Hazara

Daizangi, also spelled as Dai Zangi, (Dari: دایزنگی), is one of the major tribes of the ethnic Hazaras mostly in central Afghanistan. They inhabit in Yakawlang, Panjab and Waras districts of Bamyan Province, Lal Wa Sarjangal in Ghor Province, Shahristan district in Daykundi Province and Ab Kamari District in Badghis Province.

== History ==
Dai Zangi could be the descendants of the Ghurid ruler Taj al-Din Zangi who was the Emir of Bamyan and its surroundings from 1200-1204/5.

== Subtribes ==
The Daizangi sub-tribes include the Bubali, Gedi, Kamyaba, Kut-daghi, Khushamadi, Kirigu, Miramur, Qaraqul Daghi, Sag Deh, Sag Jui, Sag-Pae, Sehpai, Takana, Takash, Urarus, and Yangur.

== See also ==
- List of Hazara tribes
- Daizangi
