= Hazaras =

Persian-speaking ethnic group mainly in Afghanistan

Hazara هزاره
Azra آزره
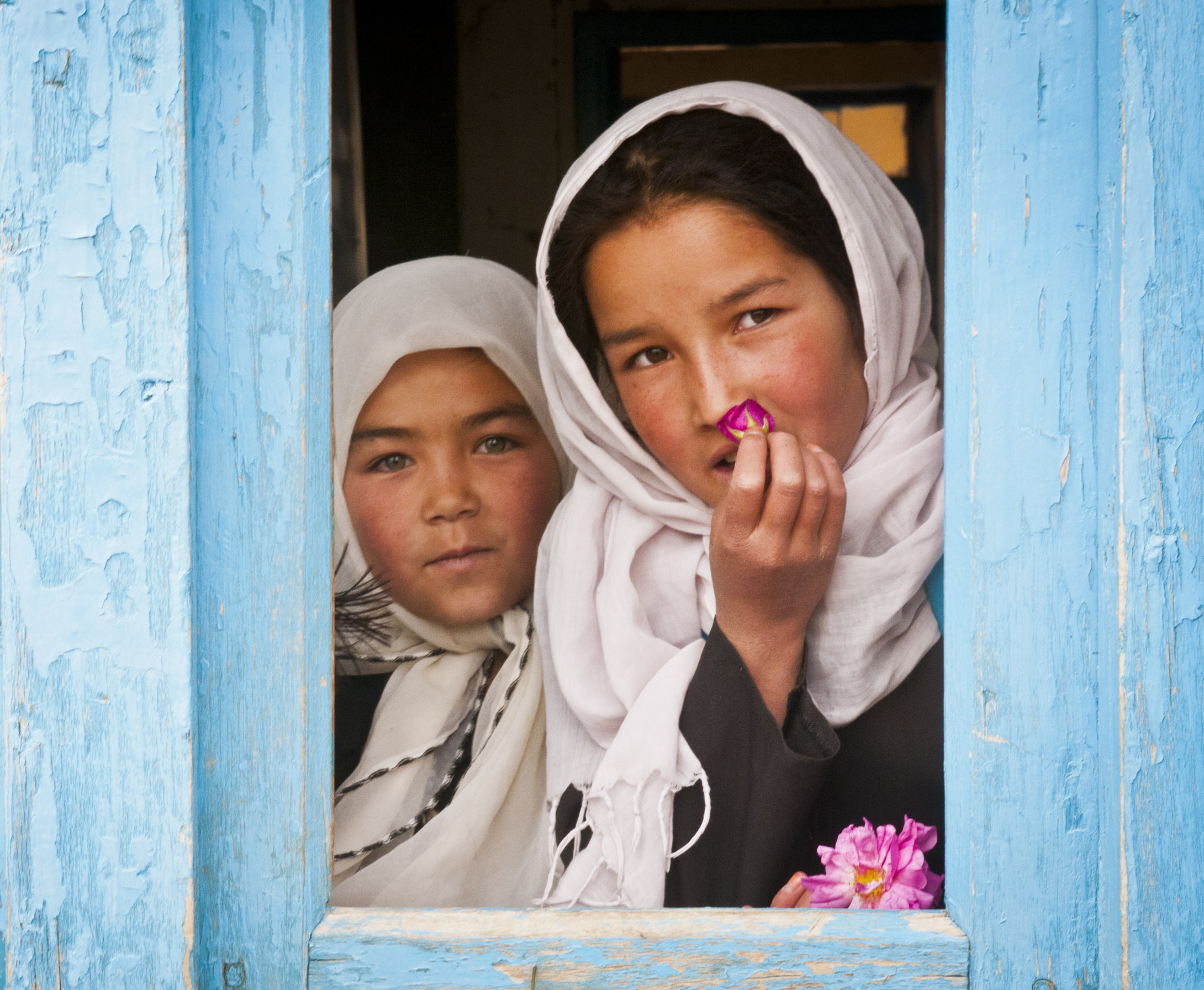
- Hazara schoolgirls in Bamyan

Total population
- c. 4.5–8 million (Note: The World Hazara Council estimates a worldwide population of up to 14 million, which is not backed up by any unbiased source.)

Regions with significant populations
- Afghanistan: c. 3.5 million (Note: Most unbiased sources estimate that Hazaras make up approximately 9% of Afghanistan's total population. Some sources, however, claim the figure is as low as 3%, while others suggest it could be as high as 20%. The World Hazara Council even claims that around 8 to 10 million Hazaras reside in Afghanistan, which would make up to a quarter of the total Afghan population and is not backed up by any unbiased source.)
- Pakistan: c. 0.4–1 million
- Iran: 500,000
- Europe: 130,000
- Australia: 41,766
- Turkey: 26,000
- Indonesia: 3,800
- Canada: 3,580

Languages
- Persian (Dari, Hazaragi)

Religion
- Islam (majority Shia, minority Sunni)

Related ethnic groups
- Aimaqs, Uzbeks, Tajiks, Turkic peoples, Mongolic peoples

Hazaras (Note: Dari: هزاره, romanized: Hazāra [ʔä.zɑː.ɾä, hä.zɑː.ɾä]; Hazaragi: آزره, romanized: Āzra [ʔɔːz.ɾä, ʔäz.ɾä]) are an ethnic group primarily residing in the Hazarajat (Hazaristan) region in central Afghanistan. They are one of the largest ethnic groups in Afghanistan. Hazaras also form significant minority communities in Pakistan, mainly in Quetta, and in Iran, primarily in Mashhad. They speak Dari and Hazaragi dialects of Persian.

Between 1888 and 1893, more than half of the Hazara population was massacred under the Emirate of Afghanistan in the Hazara genocide, and they have faced persecution at various times over the past decades. Widespread ethnic discrimination, religious persecution, organized attacks by terrorist groups, harassment, and arbitrary arrest for various reasons have affected Hazaras. There have been numerous cases of abduction and torture of Hazara women, land and home seizures, deliberate economic restrictions, economic marginalization of the Hazara region and appropriation of Hazara agricultural fields and pastures by Afghan governments, leading to their forced displacement from Afghanistan.

== Etymology ==
The etymology of the word "Hazara" is disputed, with differing opinions on its origin.

Nasir Khusraw Balkhi, the 11th-century Persian-language poet and scholar, refers to the word "Hazara" (Hazāra هزاره) in his poetry:

هزاران قول خوب و نغز و باریک
از او یابند چون تار هزاره

Hazārān qawl-i xūb u naġz u bārīk
Az ō yāband čōn tār-i Hazāra

Translation:
It is from wisdom that spring thousands of fine and thoughtful words
As does music from the strings of a Hazara tar

One of the earliest mentions of the Hazaras appears in the Baburnama, written by Babur, the founder of the Mughal Empire, in the early 16th century. The text specifically refers to prominent Hazara tribes, including the Sultan Masudi and Turkoman Hazaras.

- Historian Abdul Hai Habibi suggests that the word "Hazara" (Hazāra هزاره) is of ancient origin, derived from the term "Hazala" (Hazāla هزاله), which gradually evolved into "Hazara" over time, and originally meant "good-hearted."
- The name "Hazara" (Hazāra هزاره) is thought to derive from the Persian word "Hazar" (Hazār هزار), meaning "thousand". It may be a translation of the Mongolic word mingghan, which referred to a military unit of a thousand soldiers during the time of Genghis Khan. The term might have been used as a substitute for the Mongolic word to represent the group of people. Sayed Askar Mousavi, however, questions the theory that these military units were permanently settled by direct order of Genghis Khan or his commanders in what is now Hazarajat. He argues that no known primary sources support such a claim. He views this interpretation as historically unfounded. Nevertheless, several other historians maintain that Mongol military garrisons were indeed left behind in the region following the 13th-century invasions, and that these settlements played a significant role in the ethnogenesis of the Hazara people. According to Rashid al-Din Tabib Hamadani, the Mongols established permanent military units across Central Asia, including in Khorasan. He specifically mentions a commander named Tumay, who was stationed as a military governor (emir) in Khorasan, indicating long-term garrison activity in the area.

In their native language, the Hazaras refer to themselves as "Azra" (both as āzrə آزره as well as azra ازره).

== Origin ==
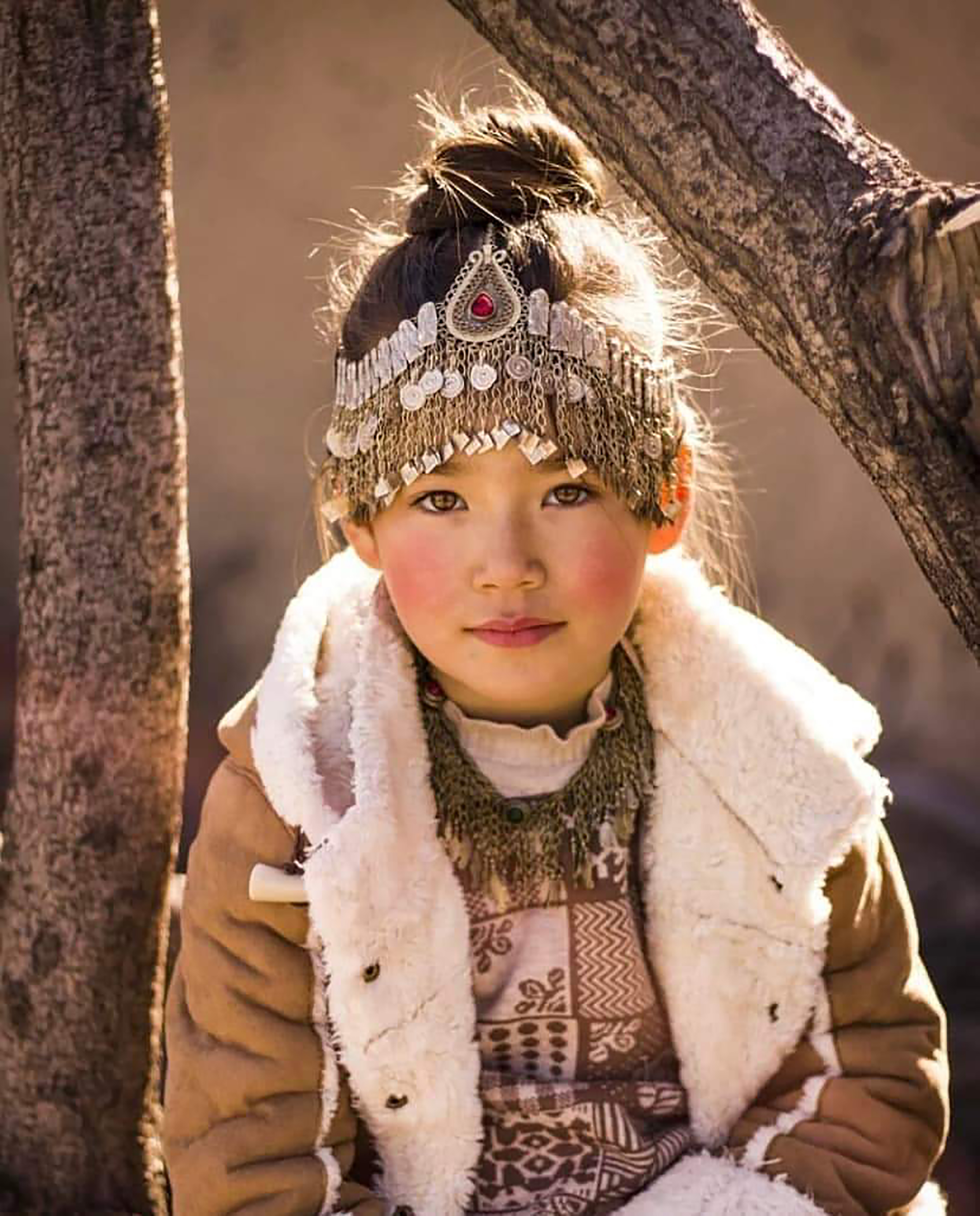
Hazara girl from Afghanistan.

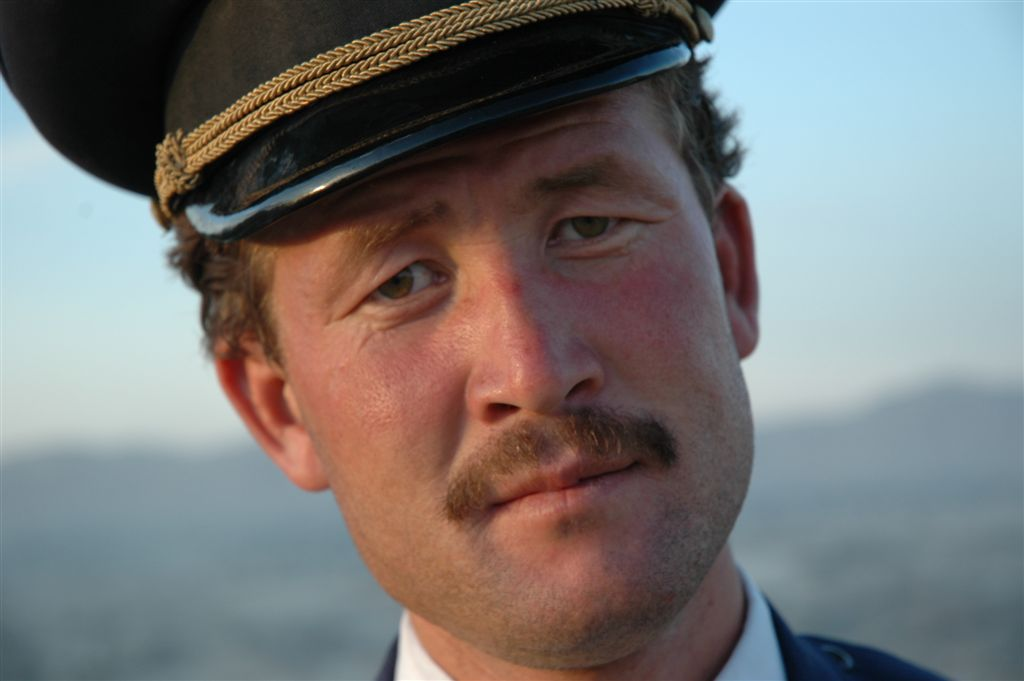
Hazara man in Kabul.

Despite being one of the principal populations in Afghanistan, the origins of the Hazara people have not been fully reconstructed. Genetically and linguistically Hazaras are an ethnically mixed group, with varying degrees of ancestry linked to contemporary Turkic, Mongolic, and Iranic populations. The physical characteristics of some Hazaras and Chahar Aimaqs are Mongolian, likely a legacy of the Mongol conquests Additionally, the Hazaras share common racial traits, physical features, and a strong resemblance to the Turkic populations of Central Asia. Babur, the founder of the Mughal Empire in the early 16th century, mentioned the Hazaras in the Baburnama, referring to some as "Turkoman Hazaras."

Over the centuries, various Mongol (Turco-Mongol) and Turkic groups, notably the Qara'unas, Chagatai Turco-Mongols, Ilkhanate, and Timurids, merged with local indigenous Turkic and Iranic populations.

Although the Hazaras are a mix of multiple distinct ethnicities, a number of researchers focus on their Mongolic component. Some authors, including Elizabeth Emaline Bacon, Barbara A. West, Yuri Averyanov, and Elbrus Sattsayev, refer to them as "Hazara Mongols". Scholars such as Vasily Bartold, Ármin Vámbéry, Vadim Masson, Vadim Romodin, Ilya Petrushevsky, Allah Rakha, Fatima, Min-Sheng Peng, Atif Adan, Rui Bi, Memona Yasmin, and Yong-Gang Yao have written about the historical use of the Mongolian language by the Hazaras. According to Sayed Askar Mousavi, the term "Moghol Hazaras" has not been found in historical documents, and no scholars have encountered "Mogholi-speaking Hazaras". However, 19th-century Hungarian orientalist Ármin Vámbéry, who personally traveled through Afghanistan, reported that some Hazara groups in the region of Herat still spoke a Mongolic dialect in his time. He also noted that the Hazaras preserved distinct Mongolian physical traits and cultural features. Similarly, the Mughal emperor Babur, in his memoirs (Baburnama), mentioned that some Hazara communities spoke Mongolian. These historical observations are frequently cited by scholars who support a Mongol origin of the Hazaras.

According to historian Lutfi Temirkhanov, Mongolian detachments left in Afghanistan by Genghis Khan or his successors became the foundational layer of Hazara ethnogenesis. Sayed Askar Mousavi, however, questions the theory that these military units were permanently settled by direct order of Genghis Khan or his commanders in what is now Hazarajat. He argues that no known primary sources support such a claim, and views this interpretation as lacking historical foundation. Nevertheless, a number of other historians maintain that Mongol military garrisons were indeed left behind in the region following the 13th-century invasions, and that these settlements played a significant role in the ethnogenesis of the Hazara people. According to Rashid al-Din, the Mongols established permanent military units across Central Asia, including in Khorasan. He specifically mentions a commander named Tumay, who was stationed as a military governor (amir) in Khorasan, indicating long-term garrison activity in the area.

In the Ghilji neighborhood, Hazaras are called Mongols. In turn, the Qarluq, Khalaj, and Turkoman peoples also contributed to the ethnogenesis of the Hazaras, with tribal names such as Qarluq and Turkoman still present among them today. Evidence for the Mongol influence in Hazara ethnogenesis includes linguistic data, historical sources, toponymy, and population genetics studies. However, alternative theories have also been proposed, highlighting the complex origins of the Hazara people.

Some historians argue that the Bamiyan Buddha statues constructed around the 5th and 6th centuries and noted for their resemblance to the Hazaras in facial features and appearance, suggest the deep historical roots of the Hazara people in the central regions of present-day Afghanistan.

Some scholars consider it historically plausible that the Hazara people's origin is rooted in Mongolic and Turkic groups who gradually entered the mountainous regions between Persia, Central Asia, and India from the 13th to 15th centuries, intermixed with local populations and adopted their language. Additionally, earlier Turko-Mongolic groups such as the Hephthalites, who inhabited the region in the 5th and 6th centuries, may have also contributed to Hazara ethnogenesis.

== History ==
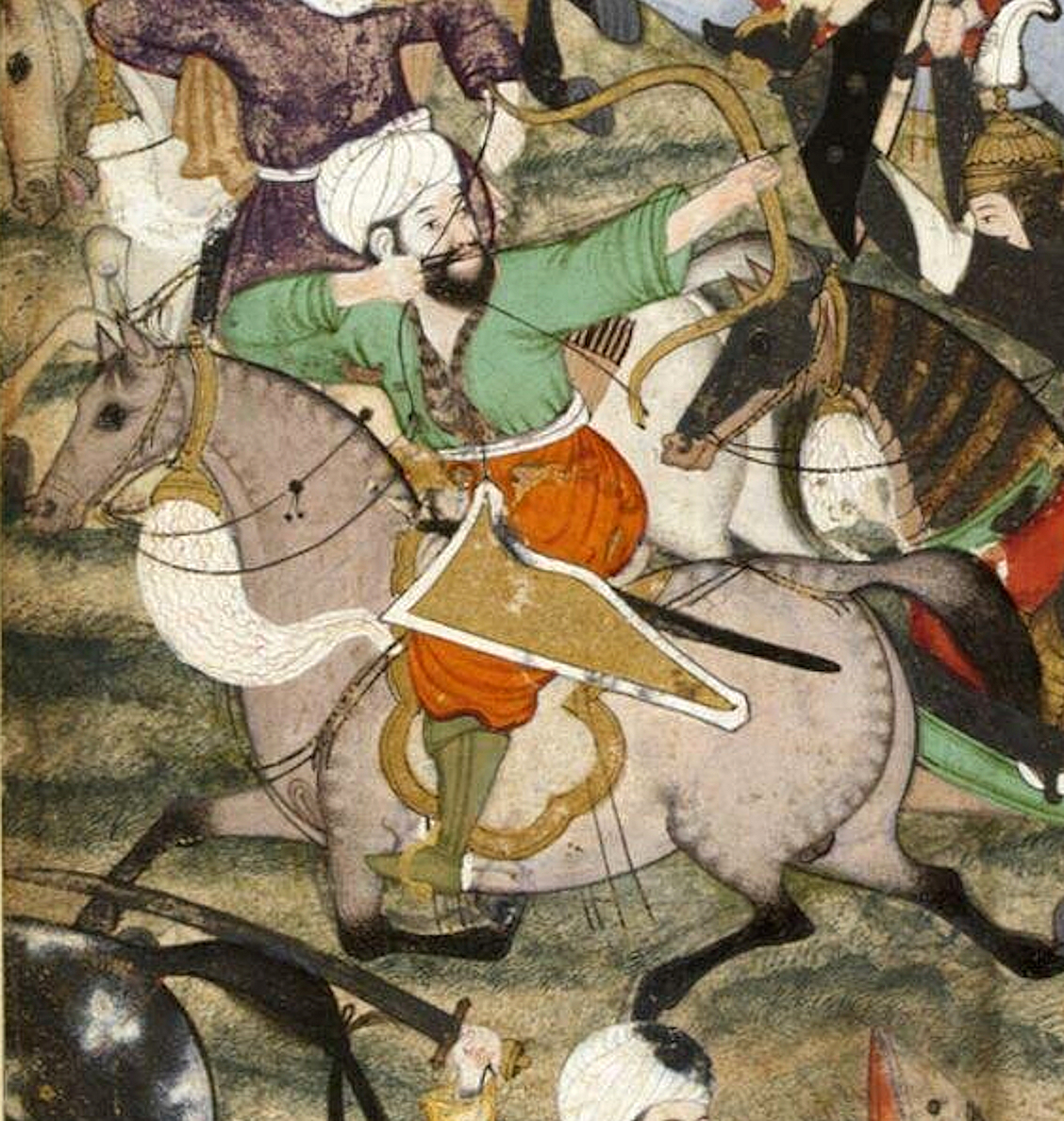
A Hazara horseman engages in battle against Babur's troops along the Herat-Kabul Road in February 1507

A mention of the Hazaras appears in Babur's Baburnama in the early 16th century, particularly referring to tribes such as the Sultan Masaudi Hazaras, Turkoman Hazaras, and Kedi Hazaras.

It is reported that the Hazaras embraced Shia Islam between the end of the 16th century and the beginning of the 17th century, during the Safavid period. In the 18th century, Hazara men, together with individuals from other ethnic groups, were enlisted into the army of Ahmad Shah Durrani.

=== 19th century ===
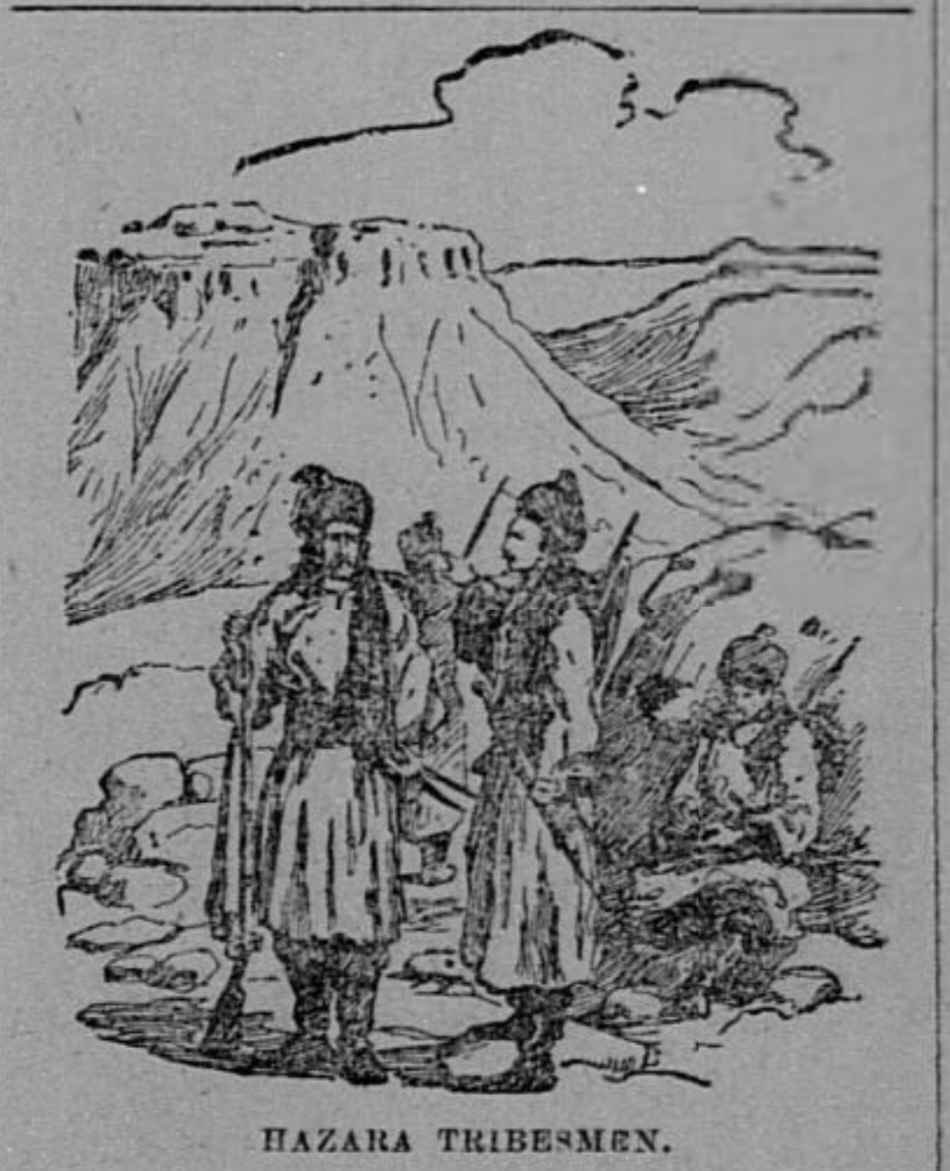
A painting of armed Hazara tribesmen in 1892

During the second reign of Dost Mohammad Khan in the 19th century, Hazaras from Hazarajat were taxed for the first time. However, for the most part, they managed to maintain their regional autonomy until the 1892 Battle of Uruzgan and the subsequent subjugation by Abdur Rahman, which began in the late 19th century.

When the Treaty of Gandomak was signed and the Second Anglo-Afghan War ended in 1880, Abdur Rahman set a goal to bring Hazaristan, Turkistan, and Kafiristan under his control. He launched several campaigns in Hazaristan in response to resistance from the Hazaras, during which his forces committed atrocities. The southern part of Hazaristan was spared, as its inhabitants accepted his rule, while other regions rejected Abdur Rahman and supported his uncle, Sher Ali Khan. In response, Abdur Rahman waged war against the tribal leaders who opposed his policies and rule. This conflict is known as the Hazara Uprisings.

These campaigns had a catastrophic impact on the demographics of the Hazaras, resulting in the massacre of over sixty percent of the total Hazara population, with many being displaced and exiled from their own lands. The Hazara lands were distributed among loyalist villagers from nearby non-Hazara communities. The repression following the uprising has been characterized as genocide or ethnic cleansing in the history of modern Afghanistan.

After these massacres, Abdul Rahman forced many Hazara families from the Hazara areas of Uruzgan and other parts of Hazaristan to leave their hometowns and ancestral lands, prompting many Hazaras to flee to neighboring countries such as Central Asia, Iran, British India, Iraq, and Syria. Those Hazaras living in the northern Hindu Kush migrated to Tsarist Russia, primarily settling in the southern cities, while some moved to Iran. Over time, many Hazaras living in Tsarist Russian regions lost their language, culture, and ethnic identity due to the similarities in racial background and physical appearance of the local population, leading them to assimilate. The fleeing Hazaras settled in former Tsarist Russia regions, including Uzbekistan, Tajikistan, Turkmenistan, Kazakhstan, and Dagestan. Meanwhile, the Hazaras from northwestern Afghanistan migrated to Iran, settling in neighborhoods in and around Mashhad, where they later became known as Khawari or Barbari. Another group of Hazaras from the southeastern regions of Afghanistan moved to British India, where they reside in Quetta (present-day Pakistan) and parts of present-day India. Additionally, some Hazaras settled in Syria and Iraq. Unlike those who migrated to Tsarist Russia, the Hazaras in Pakistan, India, Iran, Syria, and Iraq were unable to integrate fully due to differences in physical appearance, allowing them to retain their language, culture, and ethnic identity.

=== 20th and 21st century ===
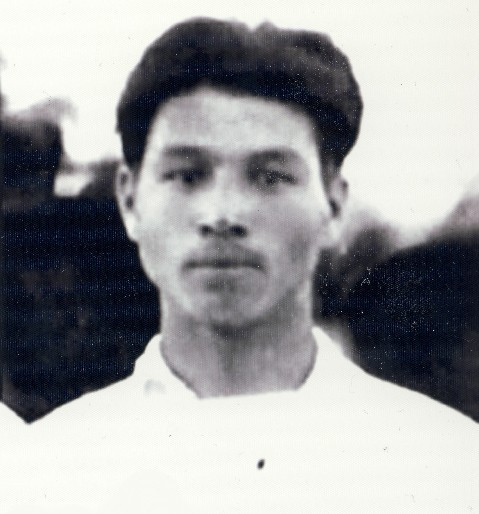
Abdul Khaliq, a school student, assassinated King Nadir Shah of Afghanistan

In 1901, Habibullah Khan, Abdur Rahman's eldest son and successor, granted amnesty to the Hazaras and invited those exiled by his predecessor to return. However, few returned, settling instead in Turkistan and Balkh province, as they had lost their previous lands. The Hazaras continued to face social, economic, and political discrimination throughout most of the 20th century. In 1933, Muhammad Nadir Shah, the King of Afghanistan, was assassinated by Abdul Khaliq Hazara, a school student. The Afghan government later captured and executed him, along with several of his family members.

Mistrust of the central government among the Hazaras and local uprisings persisted. In particular, from 1945 to 1946, during Zahir Shah's rule, a revolt led by Ibrahim Khan, known as "Ibrahim Gawsawar," erupted in response to new taxes that were imposed exclusively on the Hazaras. Meanwhile, the Kuchis were not only exempted from these taxes but also received allowances from the Afghan government. The angry rebels began capturing and killing government officials. In response, the central government sent a force to subdue the region and subsequently removed the taxes.

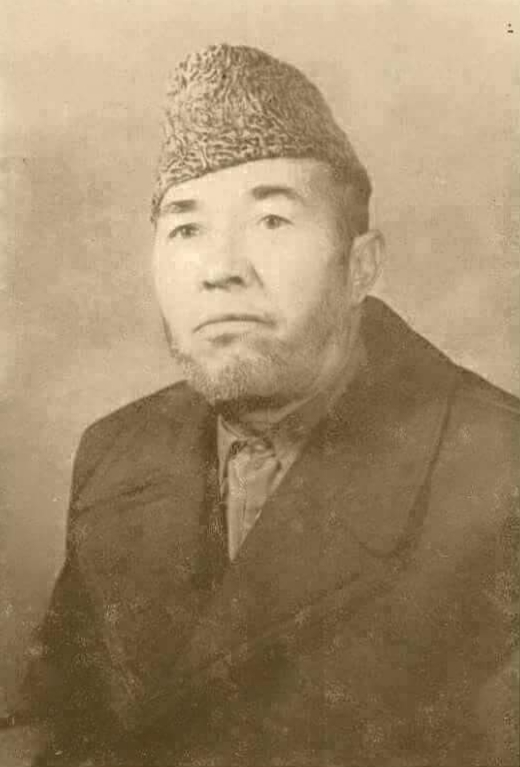
Ibrahim Khan, known as "Ibrahim Gawsawar", the leader of an armed Hazara uprising against excessive taxation during Zahir Shah's rule

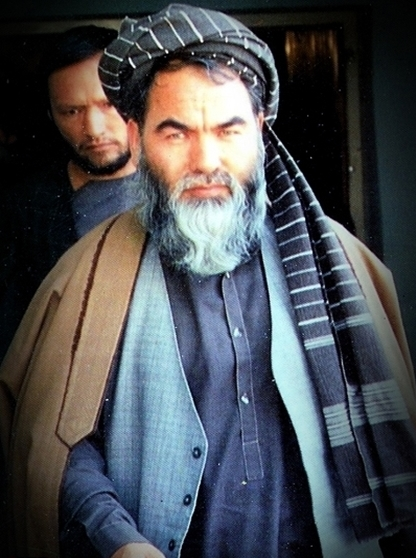
Abdul Ali Mazari, the leader of Hazaras during and following the Soviet–Afghan War

The repressive policies of the People's Democratic Party of Afghanistan (PDPA) after the Saur Revolution in 1978 led to uprisings throughout the country. Fearing Iranian influence, the Hazaras were particularly persecuted. In October 1979, President Hafizullah Amin published a list of 12,000 victims of the Taraki government, among whom were 7,000 Hazaras who had been shot in the notorious Pul-e-Charkhi prison.

During the Soviet–Afghan War, the Hazarajat region did not experience as much heavy fighting as other parts of Afghanistan. Most of the Hazara mujahideen engaged in combat against the Soviets in regions on the periphery of Hazarajat. There was a division between the Tanzeem Nasle Nau Hazara, a party based in Quetta comprising Hazara nationalists and secular intellectuals, and the Islamist parties in Hazarajat. By 1979, the Hazara Islamist groups had already liberated Hazarajat from the central Soviet-backed Afghan government and subsequently took full control of the region away from the secularists. By 1984, the Islamist dominance in Hazarajat was complete. As the Soviets withdrew in 1989, the Islamist groups recognized the need to broaden their political appeal and shifted their focus toward Hazara nationalism. This shift led to the establishment of Hizbe-Wahdat, an alliance of all Hazara resistance groups, except for Harakat-e Islami.

In 1992, with the fall of Kabul, Harakat-e Islami sided with Burhanuddin Rabbani's government, while Hizb-e Wahdat aligned with the opposition. Hizb-e Wahdat was eventually forced out of Kabul in 1995 when the Taliban captured the city and killed their leader, Abdul Ali Mazari. Following the Taliban's capture of Kabul in 1996, all Hazara groups united with the Northern Alliance against this common enemy. However, despite fierce resistance, Hazarajat fell to the Taliban in 1998. The Taliban isolated Hazarajat from the rest of the world, even preventing the United Nations from delivering food to the provinces of Bamyan, Ghor, Maidan Wardak, and Daikundi.

In 1997, a revolt broke out among the Hazaras in Mazar-e Sharif when they refused to be disarmed by the Taliban, resulting in the deaths of 600 Taliban fighters in the subsequent fighting. In retaliation, the Taliban adopted the genocidal policies reminiscent of Abdur Rahman Khan's era. In 1998, six thousand Hazaras were killed in the north, with the intent of carrying out ethnic cleansing against the Hazara population. In March 2001, the two giant Buddhas of Bamiyan were destroyed, despite widespread international condemnation.

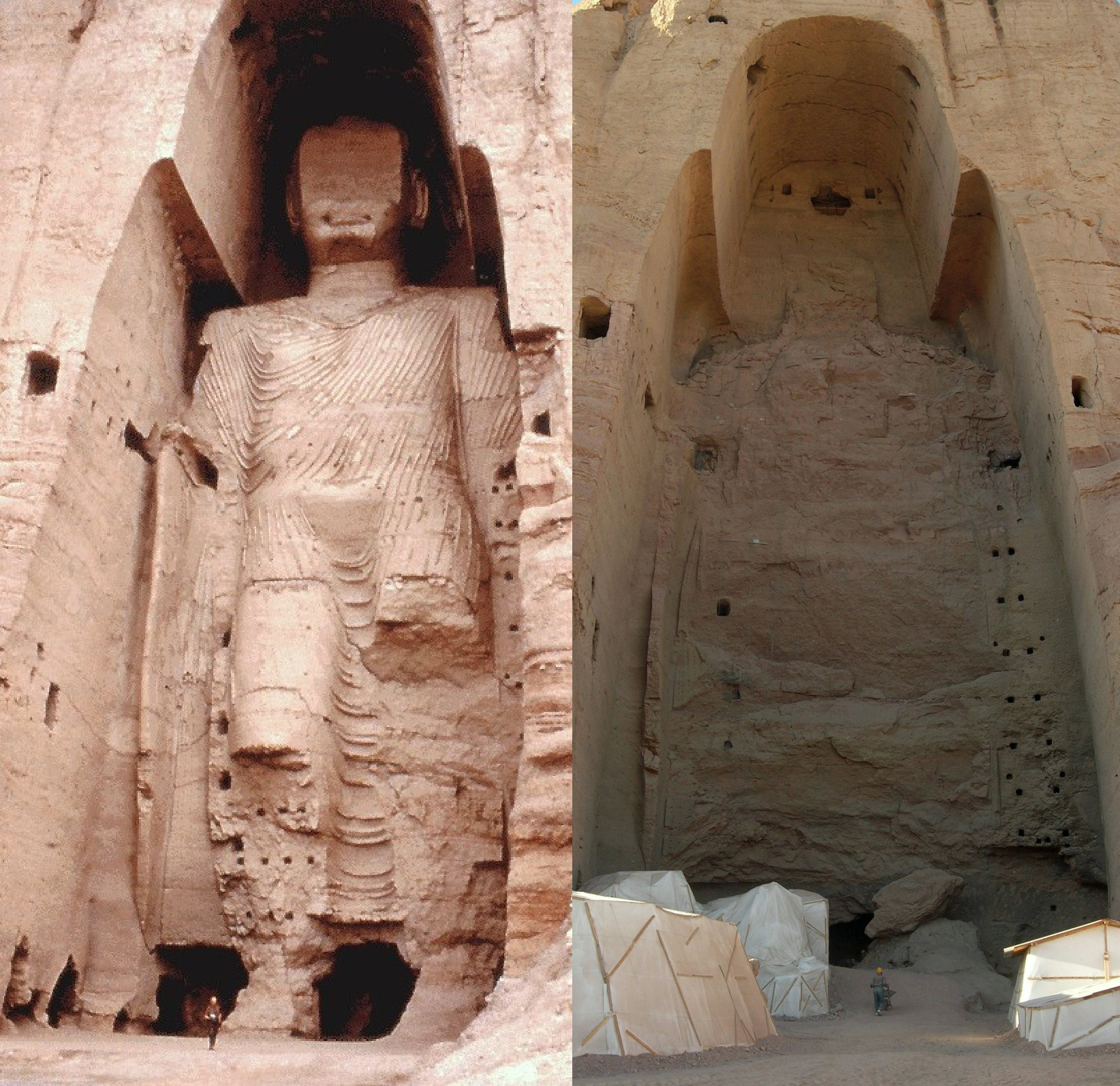
Taller Buddha of Bamiyan, 55 metres (180 ft) before and after destruction

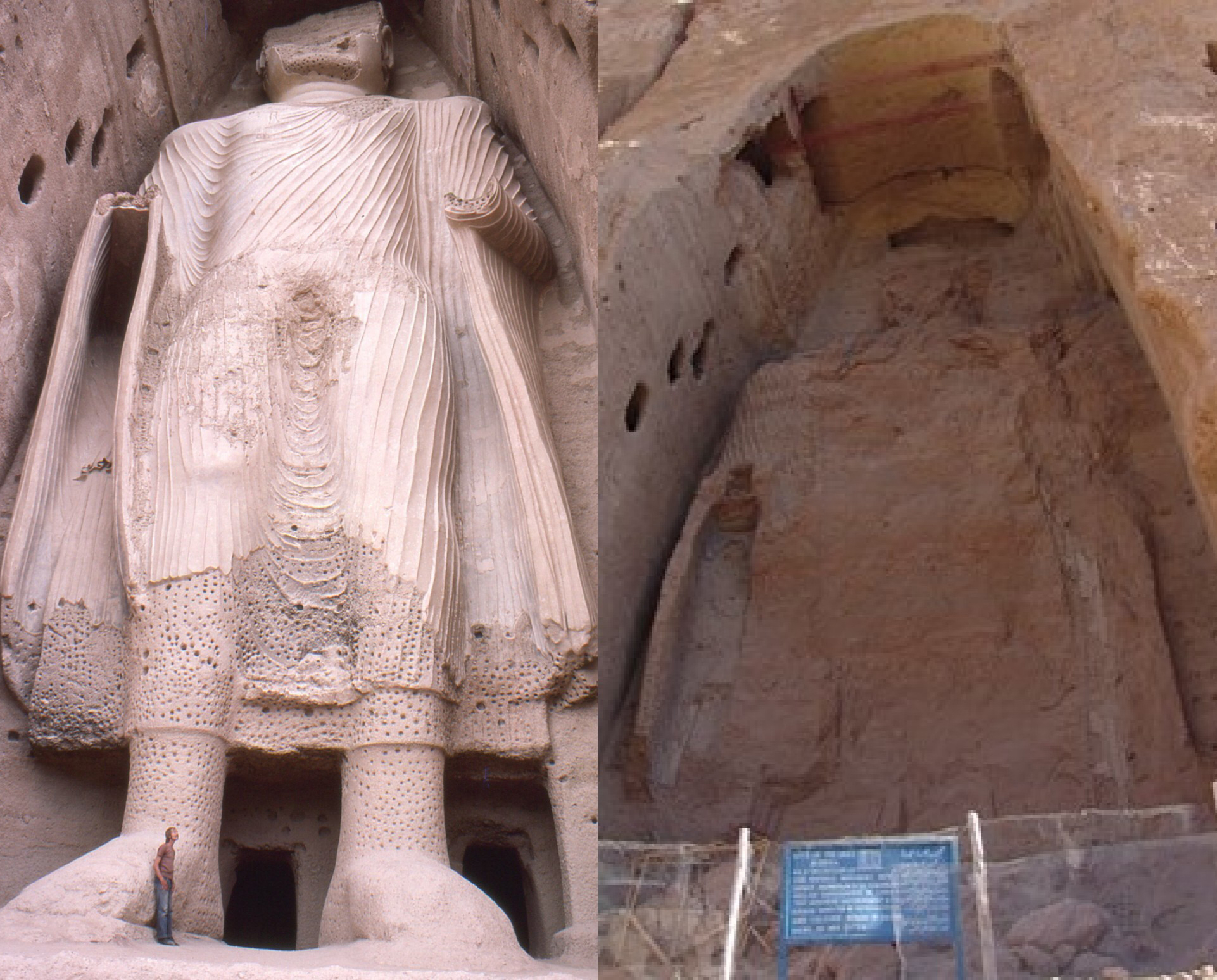
Smaller Buddha of Bamiyan, 38 metres (125 ft) before and after destruction

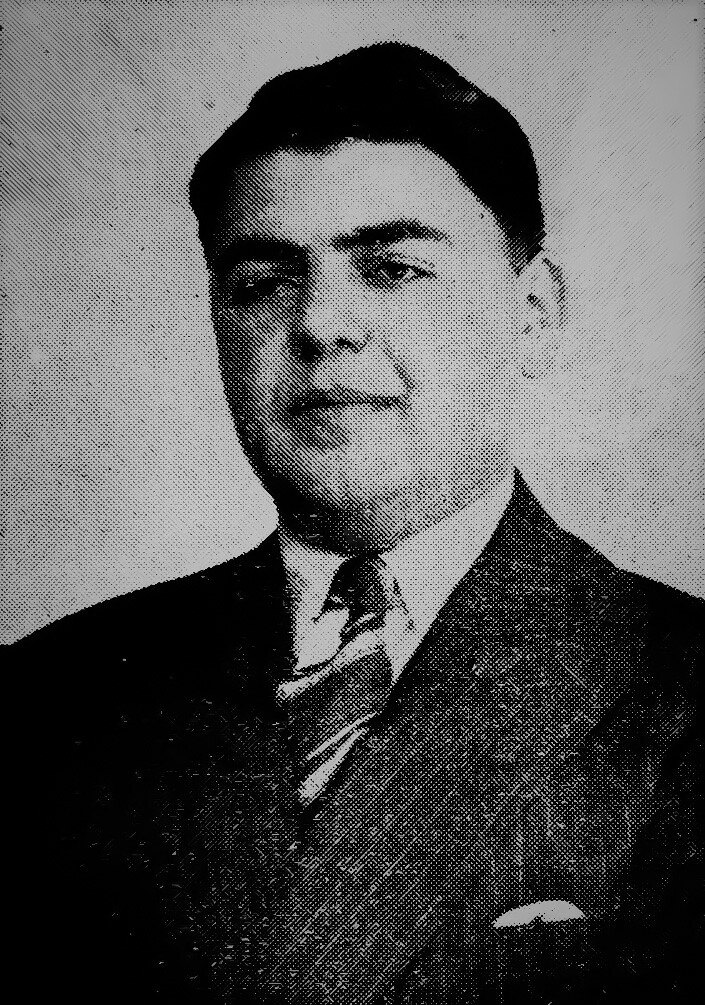
Qazi Muhammad Isa, Jinnah's close associate and a key figure of the All-India Muslim League in Balochistan, Pakistan

Hazaras have also played a significant role in the creation of Pakistan. One notable Hazara was Qazi Muhammad Isa of the Sheikh Ali tribe, who was a close friend of Muhammad Ali Jinnah; they met for the first time while studying in London. Qazi Muhammad Isa was the first person from his native province of Balochistan to obtain a Bar-at-Law degree and played a key role in establishing the All-India Muslim League in Balochistan.

Though Hazaras played a role in the anti-Soviet movement, some Hazaras also participated in the new communist government, which actively courted Afghan minorities. Sultan Ali Kishtmand, a Hazara, served as the Prime Minister of Afghanistan from 1981 to 1990, with a brief interruption in 1988. The Ismaili Hazaras of Baghlan Province likewise supported the communists, and their pir (religious leader), Jaffar Naderi, led a pro-Communist militia in the region. During the following years, the Hazaras suffered severe oppression, and numerous ethnic massacres, genocides, and pogroms were carried out by the predominantly Pashtun Taliban. These events have been documented by organizations such as Human Rights Watch. Following the September 11, 2001 attacks in the United States, American and Coalition forces invaded Afghanistan. After the fall of the Taliban, many Hazaras emerged as important figures in the country. Hazaras pursued higher education, enrolled in the army, and held various top government positions. Notable Hazaras in leadership roles included Vice Presidents, ministers, and governors, such as Karim Khalili, Sarwar Danish, Sima Samar, Muhammad Mohaqiq, Habiba Sarābi, Abdul Haq Shafaq, Sayed Anwar Rahmati, Qurban Ali Urozgani, Muhammad Arif Shah Jahan, Mahmoud Baligh, Mohammad Eqbal Munib, and Mohammad Asim Asim. Azra Jafari, the mayor of Nili, Daikundi, became the first female mayor in Afghanistan. Other notable Hazaras include Sultan Ali Keshtmand, Abdul Wahed Sarābi, Akram Yari, Ghulam Ali Wahdat, Sayed Mustafa Kazemi, Ghulam Husain Naseri, Abbas Noyan, Daoud Naji, Abbas Ibrahim Zada, Ramazan Bashardost, Ahmad Shah Ramazan, Ahmad Behzad, Nasrullah Sadiqi Zada Nili, Fahim Hashimi, Maryam Monsef, and others.

Although Afghanistan has historically been one of the poorest countries in the world, the Hazarajat region remained underdeveloped due to past government neglect. Since the ousting of the Taliban in late 2001, billions of dollars had been invested in Afghanistan for reconstruction, and several large-scale projects began in August 2012. For instance, more than 5,000 kilometers of road pavement have been completed across the country, with little done in central Afghanistan (Hazarajat). Conversely, the Band-e Amir in Bamyan Province became the first national park in Afghanistan. A road from Kabul to Bamyan was also constructed, along with new police stations, government institutions, hospitals, and schools in Bamyan, Daikundi, and other provinces predominantly inhabited by Hazaras. Additionally, the first ski resort in Afghanistan was established in Bamyan Province. Discrimination is evident in the treatment of Kuchis (Pashtun nomads who historically migrate from region to region depending on the season), who are allowed to use the pastures of Hazarajat during the summer months. It is believed that this practice began during the rule of Abdur Rahman Khan. Living in mountainous Hazarajat, where arable farmland is scarce, the Hazara people rely on these pasture lands for their livelihood during the long and harsh winters. In 2007, some Kuchi nomads entered parts of Hazarajat to graze their livestock. When the local Hazaras resisted, a clash ensued, resulting in several deaths on both sides from gunfire. Such events continue to occur, even after the central government, including President Hamid Karzai, was compelled to intervene. In late July 2012, a Hazara police commander in Uruzgan Province reportedly rounded up and killed nine Pashtun civilians in retaliation for the deaths of two local Hazaras. The Afghan government is currently investigating this matter.

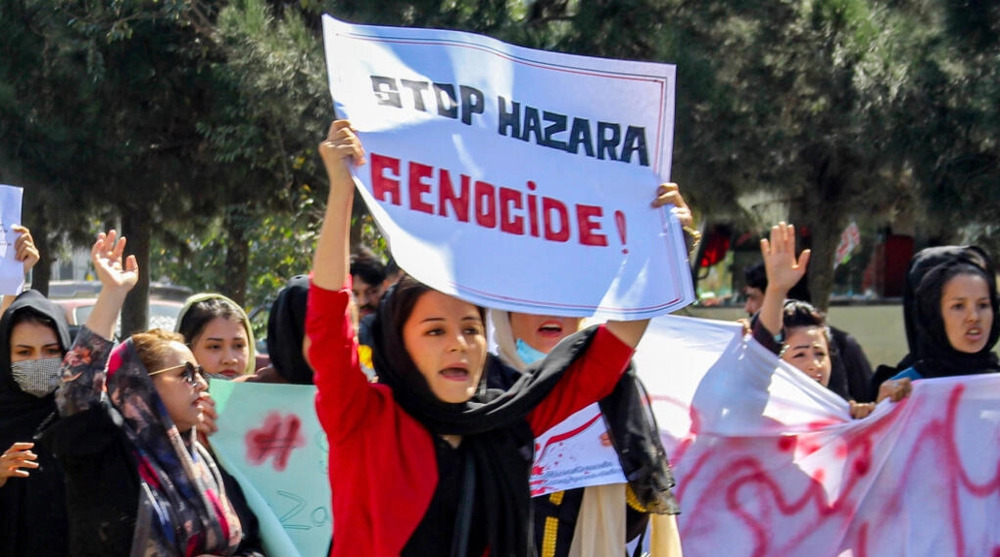
Hazara Women Condemn September 2022 Kabul school bombing

President Hamid Karzai's efforts after the Peace Jirga to negotiate a deal with Taliban leaders caused deep unease among Afghanistan's minority communities, who had fought the Taliban the longest and suffered the most during their rule. Leaders of the Tajik, Uzbek, and Hazara communities vowed to resist any return of the Taliban to power, recalling the large-scale massacres of Hazara civilians during the Taliban's previous rule. The 2021 Kabul school bombing targeted a girls' school in Dashte Barchi, a predominantly Hazara area in western Kabul. The Dashte Barchi district had frequently been attacked by the Islamic State – Khorasan Province.

Following the fall of Kabul to the Taliban in 2021, which marked the end of the war in Afghanistan, concerns were raised about whether the Taliban would reimpose the persecution of Hazaras as they did in the 1990s. An academic at Melbourne's La Trobe University stated that "The Hazaras are very fearful that the Taliban will likely reinstate the policies of the 1990s," despite Taliban reassurances that they would not revert to their previous oppressive practices. On 6 September 2022, Human Rights Watch reported that since the Taliban took over Afghanistan in August 2021, ISIS–K has claimed responsibility for 13 attacks against Hazaras and has been linked to at least three more, resulting in the deaths and injuries of at least 700 people. The Islamic State affiliate has repeatedly targeted Hazaras and other religious minorities at mosques, schools, and workplaces.

== Genetics ==
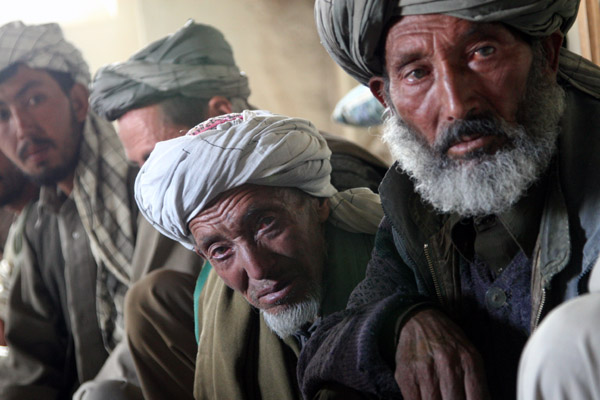
Hazara farmers in Behsud, Maidan Wardak, have developed sun-darkened skin from working tirelessly under the intense mountain sun at elevations ranging from 2,500 to 3,000 meters above sea level.

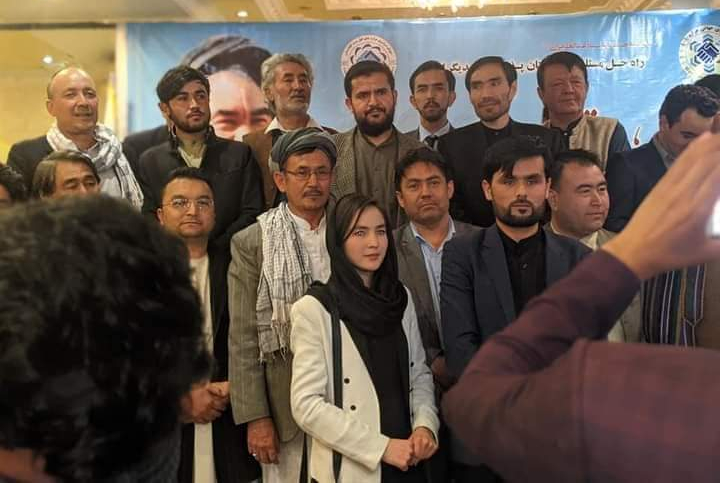
Hazaras commemorating the anniversary of Abdul Ali Mazari's death in Kabul, 2021.

Genetically, the Hazaras have a mix of West Eurasian and East Eurasian components. Genetic data shows that Hazaras in Afghanistan cluster closely with the Uzbek population, while both groups are notably distinct from Afghanistan's Tajik and Pashtun populations. There is evidence of both paternal and maternal connections to Turkic, Mongolic, and Iranic populations.

=== Autosomal admixture ===
The frequency of ancestral components among the Hazaras varies according to tribal affiliation. They show a high genetic affinity to present-day Turkic populations of Central Asia and East Asia, as well as to Mongolic populations. The genetic makeup of the Hazaras is similar to that of Uzbek, Uyghur, Kazakh, Kyrgyz, and Mongol populations.

Genetic analyses using methods such as pairwise genetic distances, multidimensional scaling (MDS), principal component analysis (PCA), and phylogenetic reconstruction have shown that the Hazaras are genetically closer to Turkic-speaking populations – such as the Uyghur, Kazakh, and Kyrgyz of northwest China – than to Mongolians, East-Asian or Indo-Iranian populations. Additional analyses, including f3, f4, f4-ratio, qpWave, and qpAdm, indicate that while Hazaras share substantial genetic components with East Asian populations, approximately 57.8% of their ancestry can be traced to Mongolian-related sources. According Guanglin He, genetic studies further suggest that the Hazaras have undergone admixture with local and neighboring populations, resulting in their present-day East–West Eurasian mixed genetic profile, which developed after their divergence from Mongolian groups.

=== Paternal haplogroups ===
The most common paternal DNA haplogroups among Hazaras from Afghanistan are the East Eurasian haplogroup C-M217 (33.33%) and the West Eurasian haplogroup R1a1a-M17 (6.67%), followed by the West Eurasian haplogroups J2-M172 and L-M20. Some Hazaras were also found to belong to the haplogroups E1b1b1-M35, L-M20, and H-M69, which they share with Tajiks, Pashtuns, and Indian populations. Additionally, one individual with the haplogroup B-M60, typically found in Eastern Africa, was identified.

Haplogroup C2 (previously known as the C3-Star cluster) is the most frequent haplogroup among Pakistani and Afghan Hazaras. Pakistani Hazaras have a high frequency of haplogroup C-M217 at approximately 40% (10/25) and haplogroup R1b at around 32% (8/25). A relatively high frequency of R1b has also been found among Eastern Russian Tatars and Bashkirs, and all three groups are thought to be associated with the Golden Horde. Haplogroup C-M217, or C2, is the most common haplogroup in Mongol and Kazakh populations. According to Sabitov, studies indicate that Y-DNA haplogroup C2 among Hazaras is linked to the expansion of the Mongols, and, as noted by Zhabagin, this genetic marker supports the Mongolian origin of the Hazaras. According to Volkov, the Turkic genetic lineage is associated with haplogroup R1b, which is most likely linked to populations of the Dasht-i-Kipchak region who were recruited from the eastern wing of the Jochid Ulus for Hülegü's campaign into Iran.

=== Maternal haplogroups ===
The Hazaras share approximately 35% of their maternal haplogroups with contemporary East Asian populations, while about 65% are shared with West Eurasian populations. Overall, the Hazaras predominantly have West Eurasian mtDNA.

== Population and distribution ==
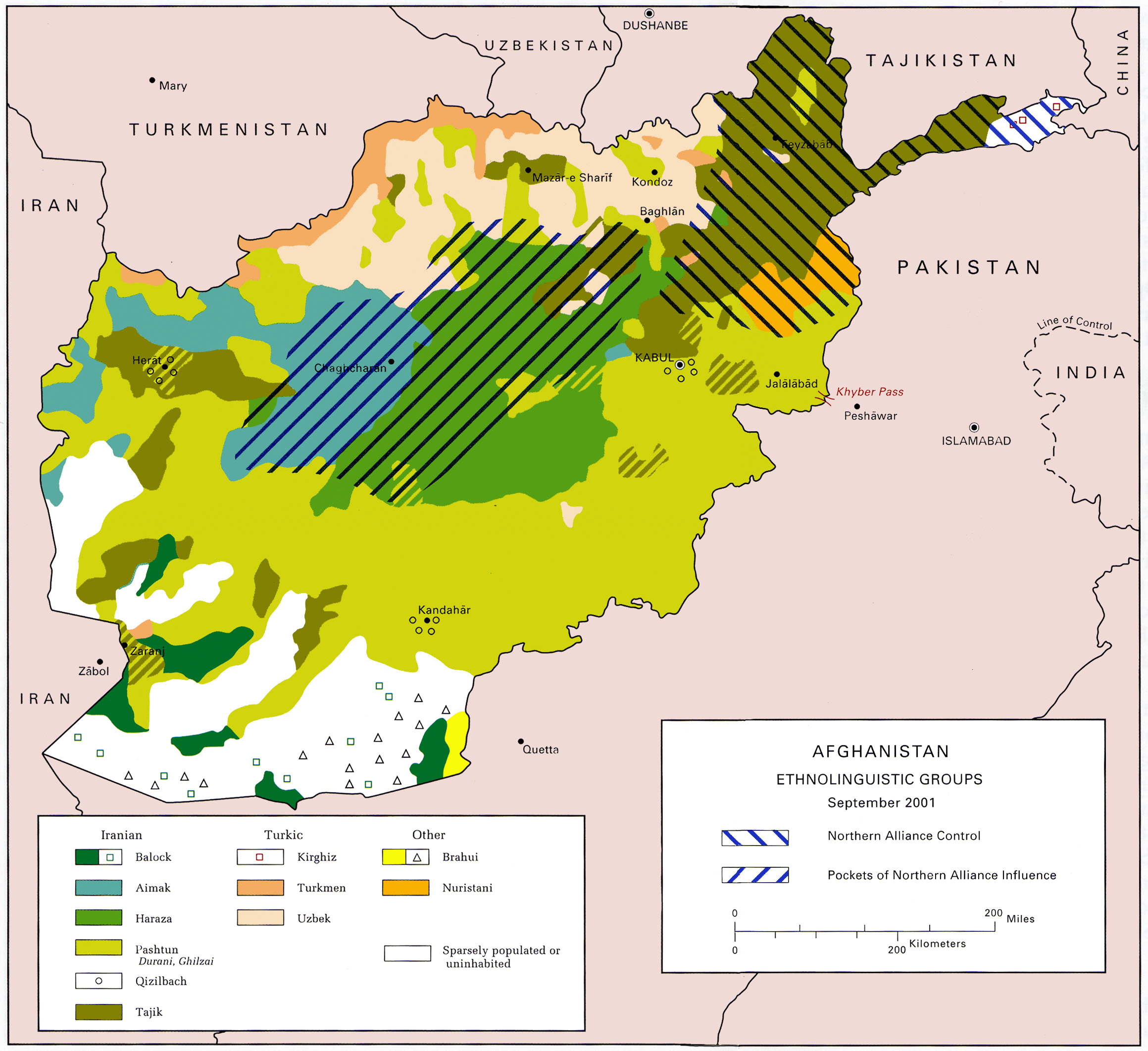
Ethnic groups in Afghanistan

Most unbiased sources estimate that Hazaras make up approximately 9% of Afghanistan's total population. Some sources, however, claim the figure is as low as 3%, while others suggest it could be as high as 20%. The World Hazara Council even claims that around 8 to 10 million Hazaras reside in Afghanistan and the Hazara population worldwide (especially in Pakistan, Iran, and other countries, largely due to historical migration and displacement) could be as high as 14 million in 2024, which would make up to a quarter of the total Afghan population and is not backed up by any unbiased source. During the Hazara uprisings between 1888 and 1893, over 60 percent of their population was massacred and forcibly displaced. Consequently, they lost a substantial portion of their ancestral lands to non-Hazaras—territory that, if retained, could have nearly doubled their current land holdings.

=== Afghanistan ===
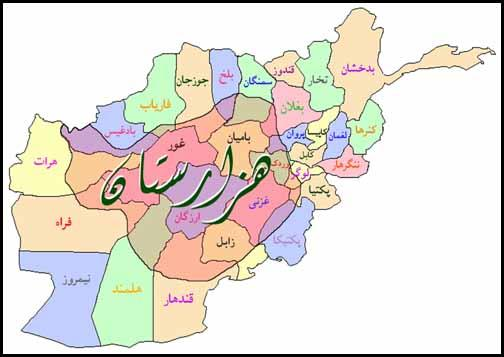
Afghanistan and the geographical region of Hazaristan in 1890

The Hazaras are among the largest ethnic groups in Afghanistan, predominantly settled in the central regions known as Hazaristan (Hazarajat), with a significant presence throughout the country.

Until the 1880s, the Hazaras maintained full autonomy and controlled all of Hazarajat. The central government in Kabul had not yet succeeded in bringing them under its rule.

=== Central Asia ===
After the massacre and genocide of the Hazaras by Abdur Rahman from 1888 to 1893, many Hazaras migrated to Central Asian regions under Tsarist Russian occupation, including Uzbekistan, Tajikistan, Turkmenistan, and Kazakhstan, with a significant number settling in Samarkand and Bukhara. Over time, many Hazaras living in these regions lost their accent, language, and ethnic identity due to the similarities in racial structure and appearance with the local populations, leading to their assimilation.

=== Pakistan ===
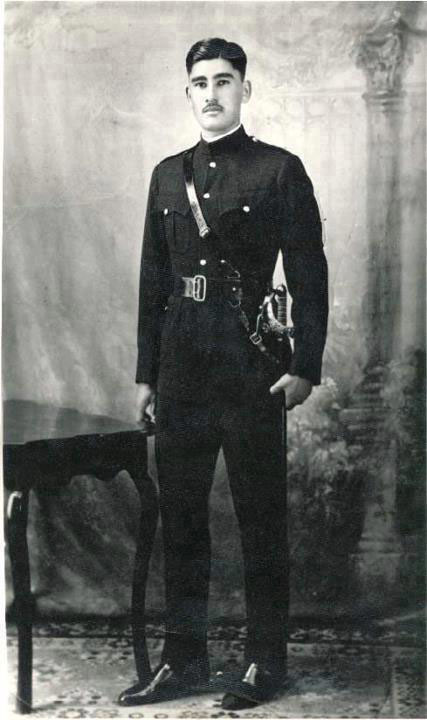
General Musa Khan, served as Commander-in-Chief of Pakistan Army

During the period of British colonial rule in the Indian subcontinent in the 19th century, Hazaras worked in coal mines, road construction, and other working-class jobs during the winter months in various cities of what is now Pakistan. The earliest record of Hazaras in Pakistan dates back to Broadfoot's Sappers Company, which was established in 1835 in Quetta and also participated in the First Anglo-Afghan War. Additionally, some Hazaras worked on agricultural farms in Sindh and contributed to the construction of the Sukkur Barrage. In 1962, the government of Pakistan officially recognized the Hazaras as one of the country's ethnic groups.

Most Pakistani Hazaras are native to Balochistan. Localities in the city of Quetta with prominent Hazara populations include Hazara Town and Mariabad. The literacy level among the Hazara community in Pakistan is relatively high compared to that of Hazaras in Afghanistan, and they have integrated well into the local society's social dynamics. Saira Batool, a Hazara woman, was one of the first female pilots in the Pakistan Air Force. Other notable Hazaras include Qazi Muhammad Isa, General Musa Khan, who served as the fourth Commander-in-Chief of the Pakistan Army from 1958 to 1968, Air Marshal Sharbat Ali Changezi, who served in the Pakistan Air Force from 1949 to 1987, Hussain Ali Yousafi, the slain chairman of the Hazara Democratic Party, and Sayed Nasir Ali Shah, a Member of the National Assembly from Quetta, along with his father Haji Sayed Hussain Hazara, who was a senator and member of the Pakistan Parliament during the Zia-ul-Haq era.

Despite this, Hazaras are often targeted by militant groups such as Lashkar-e-Jhangvi and others. Activists report that at least 800 to 1,000 Hazaras have been killed since 1999, and the pace is quickening. According to Human Rights Watch, more than one hundred have been murdered in and around Quetta between January and October 2012. The political representation of the community is served by the Hazara Democratic Party, a secular liberal democratic party headed by Abdul Khaliq Hazara.

=== Iran ===
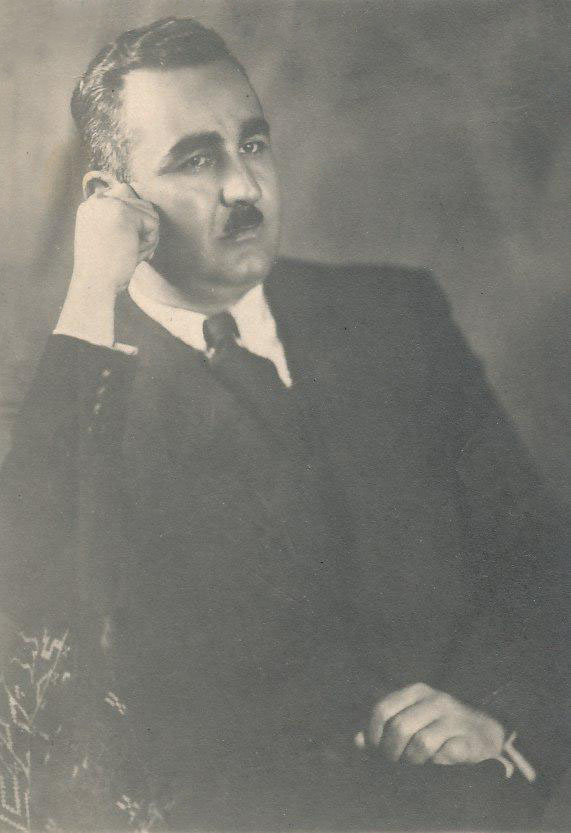
Muhammad Yusuf Khan Hazara, also known as "Sulat al-Sultanah Hazara", a prominent Hazara leader and the first Sunni representative to serve in the Iranian Parliament

The Hazara people in Iran are also referred to as Khāwari (Persian: خاوری) or Barbari (بربری). Over many years, due to political unrest in Afghanistan, some Hazaras have migrated to Iran. Before Iran was forced to relinquish the Herat region according to the Treaty of Paris in 1857 during the reign of Naser al-Din Shah, the country possessed a much larger part of Greater Khorasan. One of the tribes that roamed this area prior to the cession was the Hazaras. After the border between Iran and Afghanistan was drawn, the tribe settled on both sides of the border. The leadership of this tribe at the end of the Qajar period and during the Pahlavi period was held by Muhammad Yusuf Khan Hazara, known as "Sulat al-Sultanah Hazara." He was a Sunni Hazara, a politician, and the first Sunni representative in the Iranian Parliament, as well as the only Sunni Iranian to represent Mashhad in the history of Iran's legislatures.

=== India ===
The Attarwala claim descent from Hazaras who mainly inhabit the state of Gujarat, India. They are descended from a group of Mughal soldiers who were initially settled in Agra during the rule of Mughal Emperor Jahangir. According to their recorded documents, they then migrated to Ahmedabad via Gwalior, Ratlam, and Godhra. This migration followed their participation in the community during the 1857 Indian War of Independence. Once settled in Gujarat, the community took up the occupation of manufacturing perfumes known as ittars. The term "attarwala" means "manufacturer of perfumes." A second migration occurred in 1947 from Agra after the partition of India, with some members immigrating to Pakistan, while others joined their co-ethnics in Ahmedabad.

=== Diaspora ===
Alessandro Monsutti argues in his recent anthropological book that migration is a traditional way of life for the Hazara people, referring to the seasonal and historical migrations that have never ceased and do not seem to be dictated solely by emergencies such as war. Due to decades of conflict in Afghanistan and sectarian violence in Pakistan, many Hazaras have left their communities and settled in Australia, New Zealand, Canada, the United States, the United Kingdom, and particularly the Northern European countries such as Sweden and Denmark. Some migrate as exchange students, while others do so through human smuggling, which sometimes costs them their lives. Since 2001, about 1,000 people have died at sea while attempting to reach Australia by boat from Indonesia, many of whom were Hazaras. A notable case was the Tampa affair, in which a shipload of refugees, mostly Hazaras, was rescued by the Norwegian freighter MV Tampa and subsequently sent to Nauru.

== Religion ==
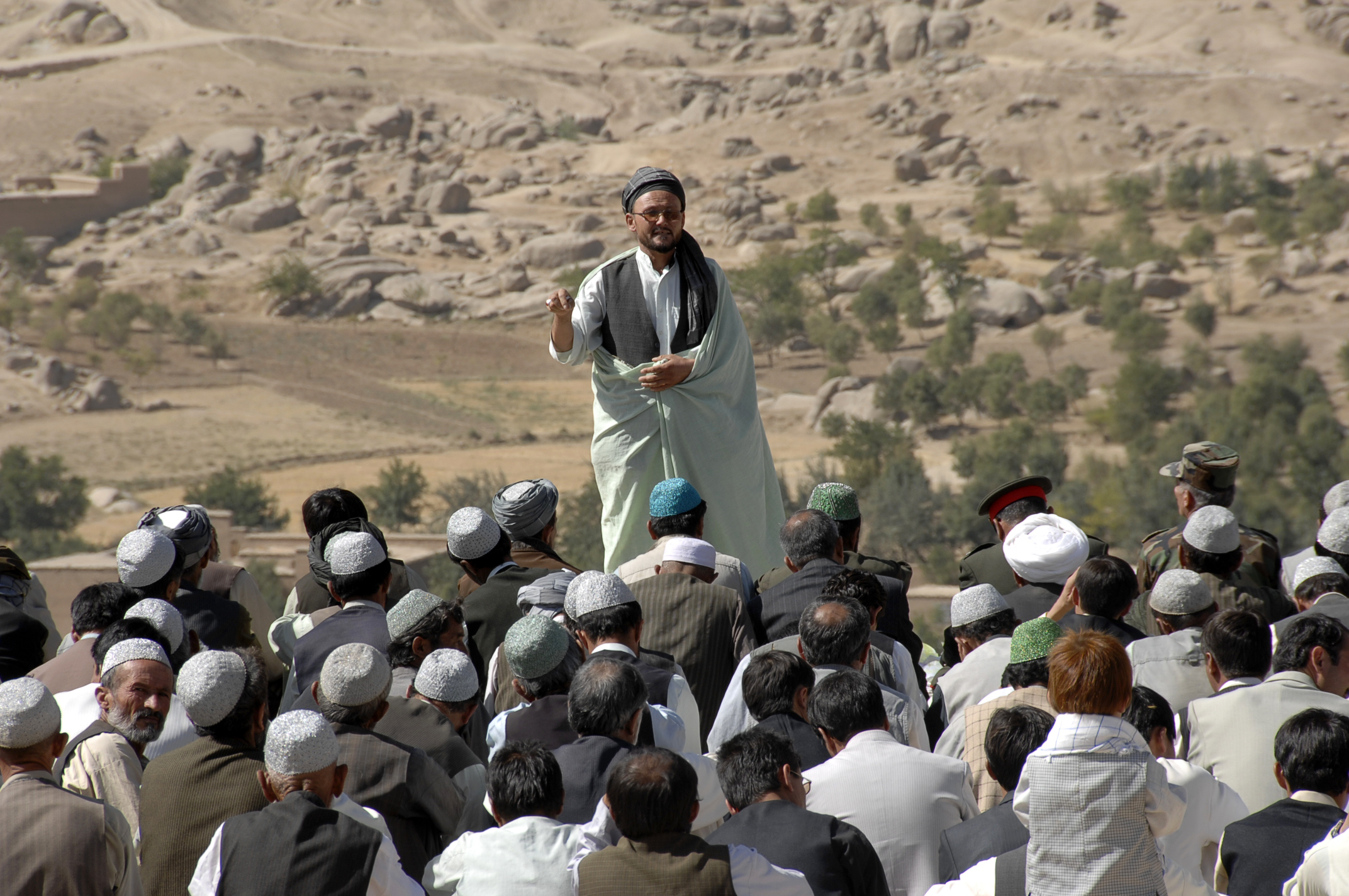
A gathering of Hazaras on the final day of Ramadan in Daikundi Province.

Hazaras predominantly practice Islam, with most adhering to Shia Islam, a significant portion following Sunni Islam, and smaller groups practicing Isma'ilism and non-denominational Islam. The majority of Afghanistan's population practices Sunni Islam, which may have contributed to the persecution of Hazaras.

=== Shia Hazaras ===
There is no definitive theory regarding the acceptance of Shia Islam by the majority of Hazaras. It is possible that most Hazaras adopted Shi'a Islam in the early 16th century, during the initial years of the Safavid dynasty.

=== Sunni Hazaras ===
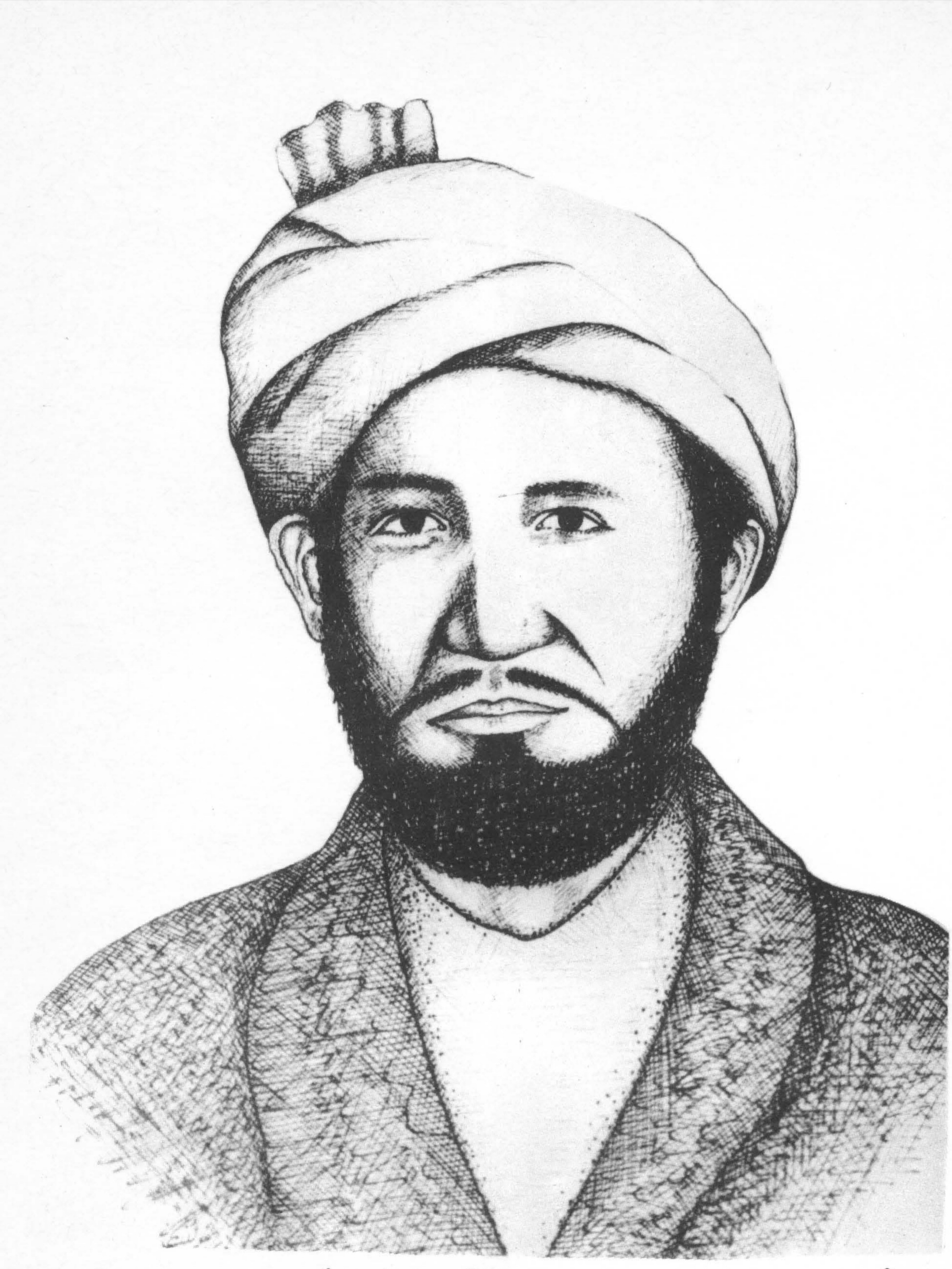
Sher Muhammad Khan Hazara, the chieftain of the Sunni Hazaras from Qala-e-Naw, Badghis

Sunni Hazaras have practiced Sunni Islam for a long time, predating the Afghan amir Abdul Rahman Khan's occupation of Hazarajat. However, some were forcefully converted from Shi'a to Sunni Islam following Abdur Rahman's occupation and the Hazara genocide. In Afghanistan, they primarily inhabit the provinces of Baghlan, Badghis, Ghor, Kunduz, Panjshir, Bamyan, Badakhshan, Parwan, and Kabul.

Sher Muhammad Khan Hazara, a Sunni Hazara and chieftain of the Hazaras of Qala e Naw, was a warlord who participated in the Sunni coalition that defended Herat in 1837. He was also one of those who defeated British forces around Qandahar and in the Maiwand desert during the First Anglo-Afghan War (1838–1842).

During the 1996–2001 Afghan Civil War, the Taliban also forcefully converted Shia Hazaras into Sunni.

In recent years, a number of intellectuals and activists have established the National Council of Sunni Hazaras of Afghanistan. The council aims to provide representation and a collective voice for this community, which is often described as a "minority within a minority," in the country's social and political spheres.

=== Isma'ili Hazaras ===
Isma'ili Hazaras primarily reside in the provinces of Kabul, Parwan, Baghlan, Bamyan, Maidan Wardak, Samangan, and Zabul. They have historically been separated from other Hazaras due to religious beliefs and political reasons.

== Culture and society ==
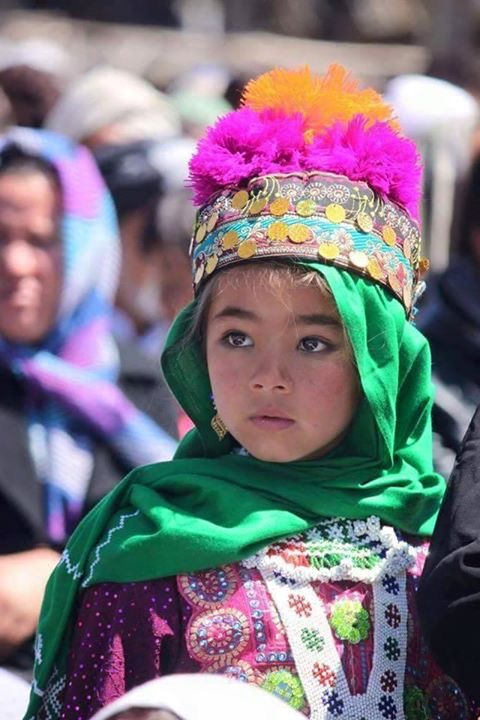
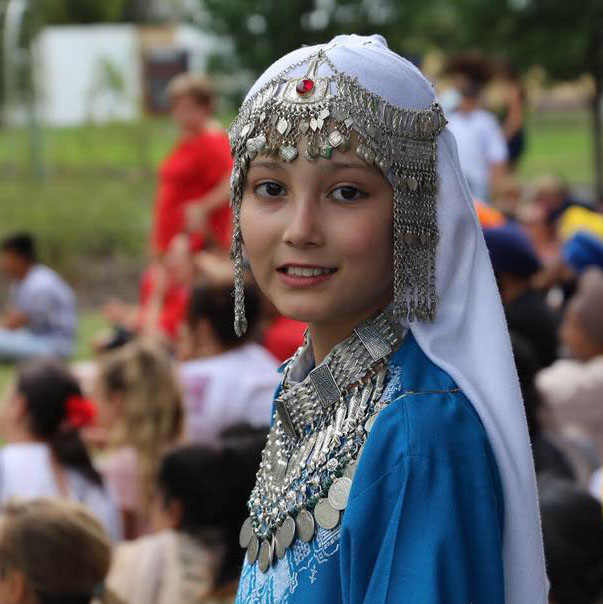
Hazara girls in traditional clothing

Hazara culture consists of their customs, traditions, behaviours, beliefs, and norms. This culture has developed through a series of interactions with and responses to surrounding peoples and environments. Outside of Hazarajat, many Hazara communities have embraced aspects of the local cultures in which they reside, often blending elements of Afghan Tajiks and Pashtuns traditions. However, in Hazarajat, many of the original customs and traditions remain intact. These are more closely aligned with those of Central Asia than with the Afghan Tajiks. Traditionally, the Hazara people have been highland farmers. While most Hazaras live in permanent homes, certain groups, such as the Aimaq Hazara, continue to maintain a semi-nomadic lifestyle. These communities often live in felt yurts rather than traditional dwellings.

Before the Afghan ruler Abdur Rahman Khan conquered Hazarajat between 1888 and 1893—a period known as the Hazara genocide—Hazara society was structured under a feudal system. The social hierarchy was dominated by influential landowners and powerful figures, such as khans, beigs, arbabs, mirs, or maliks, who held authority over the land and society. Below them, the clerics (mullahs) and sayyids held the second tier. The Hazara economy was largely centered on agriculture and livestock.

=== Attire ===
Hazara attire is primarily handcrafted and helps uphold the cultural identity of the group.

==== Male clothing ====
Hazara men traditionally wear a barak (also known as barag) alongside a hat, with the barak being a key element of Hazara clothing. This soft, thick garment is crafted from the first wool sheared from special sheep raised in the Hazarajat region, making it both luxurious and durable. Beyond its regal appearance, the Hazara barak serves a practical function as a warm winter garment. Its unique properties make it resistant to moisture, allowing it to stay dry even in snow and rain. Additionally, the fabric's softness is believed to reduce muscle pain and relieve joint discomfort. In contemporary times, however, the perahan o tunban has become the most common attire among Hazara men, often worn with a hat or turban.

==== Female clothing ====
The traditional clothing of Hazara women includes a pleated skirt with a tunban or undergarment. The lower tunbans are made from fabrics such as flowered chits, while the upper skirts are crafted from finer materials like velvet, zari, or net, often adorned with a border or decoration at the bottom. The women's shirt is calf-length, with a close collar and long sleeves, featuring slits on both sides that fit over the skirts. Hazara women's clothing varies according to social, economic, and age factors. Young Hazara women typically wear outfits made from different fabrics in vibrant colors and cheerful designs, complemented by colorful chadors. In contrast, older women prefer darker fabrics with simple black-and-white patterns. Hazara women's chadors, or head coverings, are often embellished with ornaments, typically silver or gold, and sometimes paired with a hat. The adornments on their clothing include silver or gold necklace with colorful beads, buttons, bangles, and silver or gold bracelets.

==== Headgear ====
The Hazara people have a tradition of wearing distinct headgear, with styles varying for men and women. These hats and caps come in various forms, some made from animal skin and others crafted from barak. Additionally, some Hazara men wear the traditional Greater Khorasani turban.

=== Cuisine ===
The Hazara cuisine is deeply influenced by Central Asian, South Asian, and Persian culinary traditions.

=== Language ===
The words Hazāragi, Āzargi, and Azargi in Hazaragi Persian and written in Nastaliq.

The Hazaras speak Dari and Hazaragi, eastern dialects of the Persian language.

According to the Encyclopaedia of Islam, Hazaragi is a dialect of Persian, infused with many Turkic and some Mongolic words. The Encyclopædia Britannica describes Hazaragi as an eastern variety of Persian containing numerous Mongolic and Turkic words. Similarly, Encyclopaedia Iranica notes that Hazaras speak a Persian dialect with many Turkic and some Mongolic words. Other sources describe the Hazara population as speaking Persian with some Mongolic words. An Iranica article on the language of Hazaras states that the dialect consists of three linguistic layers: (1) pre-Mongol Persian, with its own substratum; (2) Mongolian; and (3) modern Tajiki, preserving elements of both (1) and (2). The primary difference between Persian and Hazaragi lies in the accent. Despite these variations, Hazaragi remains mutually intelligible with Dari, the official language of Afghanistan.

According to scholar Lutfi Temirkhanov, the ancestors of the Hazaras were originally Mongol-speaking. However, following their resettlement, they began to intermingle with Persian- and Turkic-speaking populations. Temirkhanov explains, "Hordes of Mongol princes and feudal lords found themselves in a Persian-speaking environment; they mixed with them, were influenced by Persian-Tajik culture, and gradually adopted the Persian language." Sayed Askar Mousavi, however, questioned the theory that these military units were permanently settled by direct order of Genghis Khan or his commanders in what is now Hazarajat. He argues that no known primary sources support such a claim and that this interpretation lacks a historical foundation. Nevertheless, a number of other historians maintain that Mongol military garrisons were indeed left behind in the region following the 13th-century invasions, and that these settlements played a significant role in the ethnogenesis of the Hazara people. According to Rashid al-Din Hamadani, the Mongols established permanent military units across Central Asia, including in Khorasan. He specifically mentions a commander named Tumay, who was stationed as a military governor (amir) in Khorasan, indicating long-term garrison activity in the area.

Some sources indicate that in the 16th century, during the time of Babur, some Hazaras still spoke a Mongolian language. According to the Great Russian Encyclopedia and other sources, some Hazaras continued to speak Mongolian until the 19th century. Temirkhanov notes that Mongolic words make up about 10% of the Hazara vocabulary. Approximately 20 percent of the Hazara vocabulary consists of Turkic and Mongolic words, with the proportion of each varying by source; some studies report a predominance of Turkic terms, while others highlight a stronger Mongolic influence.

According to Sayed Askar Mousavi, the term "Moghol Hazaras" has not been found in historical documents, and no scholars have encountered "Mogholi-speaking Hazaras". However, 19th-century Hungarian orientalist Ármin Vámbéry, who personally traveled through Afghanistan, reported that some Hazara groups in the region of Herat still spoke a Mongolic dialect in his time. He also noted that the Hazaras preserved distinct Mongolian physical traits and cultural features. Similarly, the Mughal emperor Babur, in his memoirs (Baburnama), mentioned that some Hazara communities spoke Mongolian. These historical observations are frequently cited by scholars who support a Mongol origin of the Hazaras.

According to Efimov, examples of vocabulary in Hazaragi that reflect Turkic influence include ata ("father"), kaṭa ("big, large"), qara ("black"), kunda ("plow"), qōš ("eyebrow"), while words of Mongolic origin include bêri ("bride"), alaḡa ("palm of the hand"), qulaḡay ("thief"), xatun ("wife, woman"), ōḡil ("village"), and others.

=== Hazara tribes ===
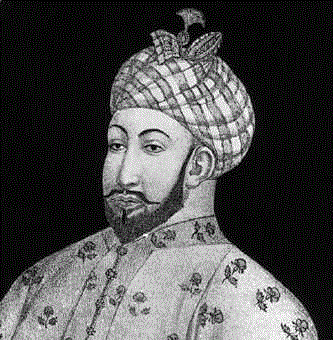
A miniature of Emir Muhammad Khwaja

The Hazara people are organized into various tribes. Some prominent Hazara tribes include Sheikh Ali, Jaghori, Jaghatu, Qara Baghi, Muhammad Khwaja, Behsudi, Dai Mirdad, Turkmani, Uruzgani, Daikundi, Daizangi, Daichopan, Daizinyat, Qarlugh, Aimaq Hazara, and others.

=== Art ===
==== Writers and poets ====
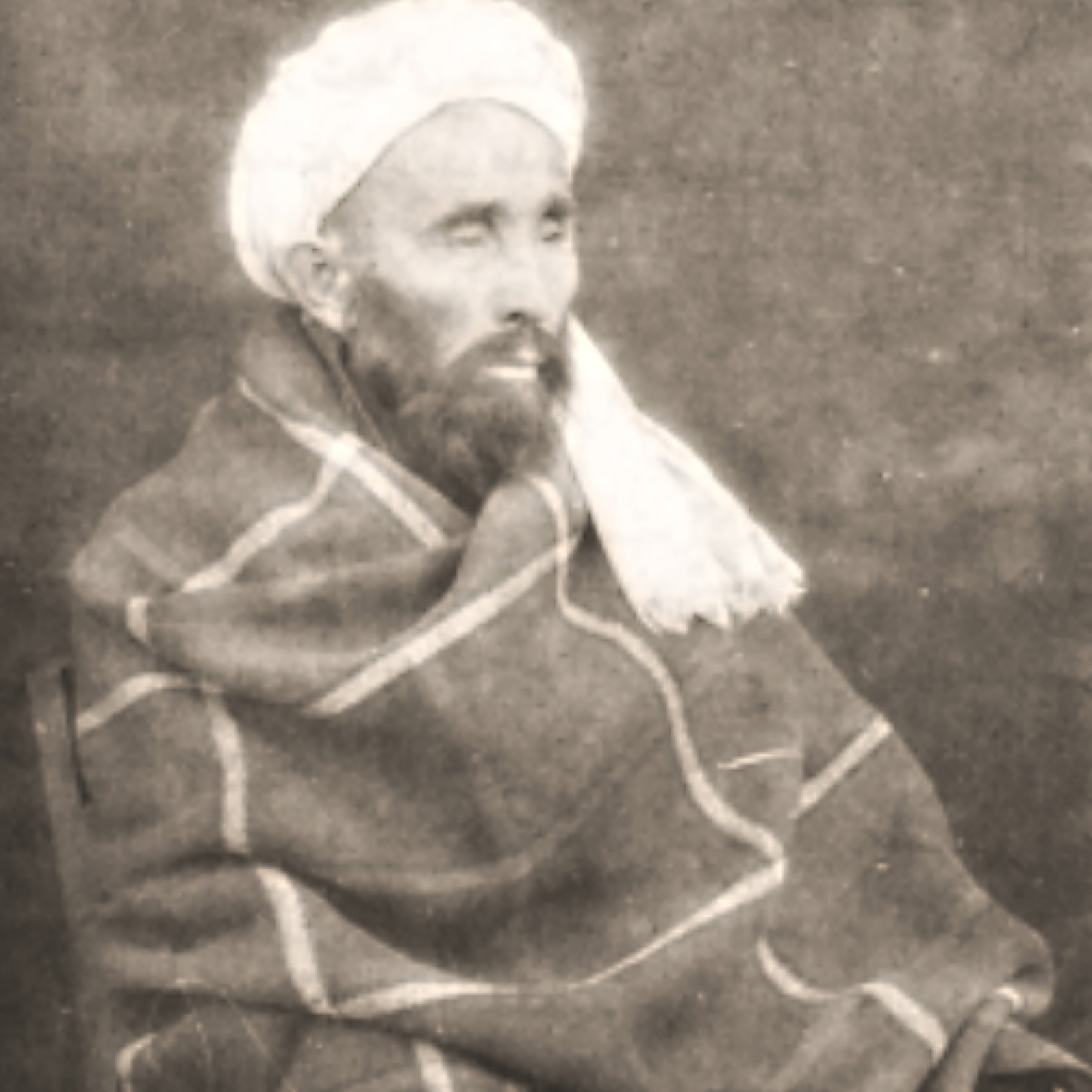
Faiz Muhammad Kateb, a prominent writer and historian

Some well-known Hazara writers and poets include Faiz Muhammad Kateb, Amir Khosrow Dehlavi, Ismael Balkhi, Hassan Poladi, Kazim Yazdani, Ali Mohaqiq Nasab, Kamran Mir Hazar, Basir Ahang, Sayed Askar Mousavi, Ali Baba Taj, Sayed Abutalib Mozaffari, Rahnaward Zaryab, and Aziz Royesh, among others.

==== Music ====
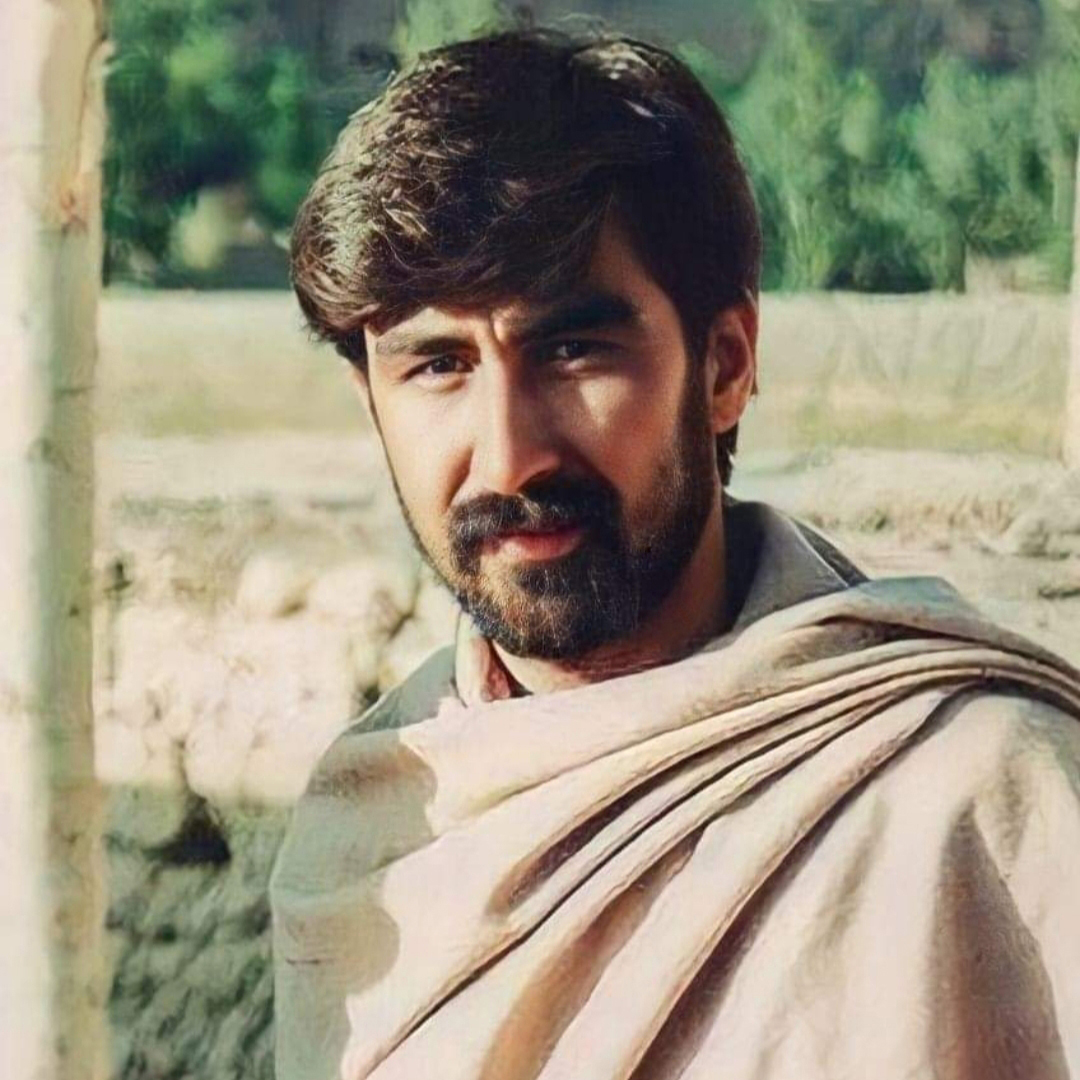
Dawood Sarkhosh, a folklore Hazara musician

Many Hazara musicians are widely recognized for their skill in playing the dambura, a native lute instrument also found in other Central Asian countries such as Kazakhstan, Uzbekistan, and Tajikistan. Notable Hazara musicians and dambura players include Sarwar Sarkhosh, Dawood Sarkhosh, Safdar Tawakoli, and Sayed Anwar Azad, among others. Revolutionary hymns are particularly common in Hazara dambura music, with Sarwar Sarkhosh being the first singer to popularize them. His main message centered on the uprising of the younger generation and the fight against oppression. Additionally, the ghaychak, a traditional field instrument, is played similarly to a fiddle. Its resonance bowl is typically made from walnuts or berries, and its strings are metal, making it one of the stringed instruments in Hazara music.

Renowned Pakistani musician Nusrat Fateh Ali Khan is also a descendant of the Hazaras of Afghanistan.

==== Cinema ====
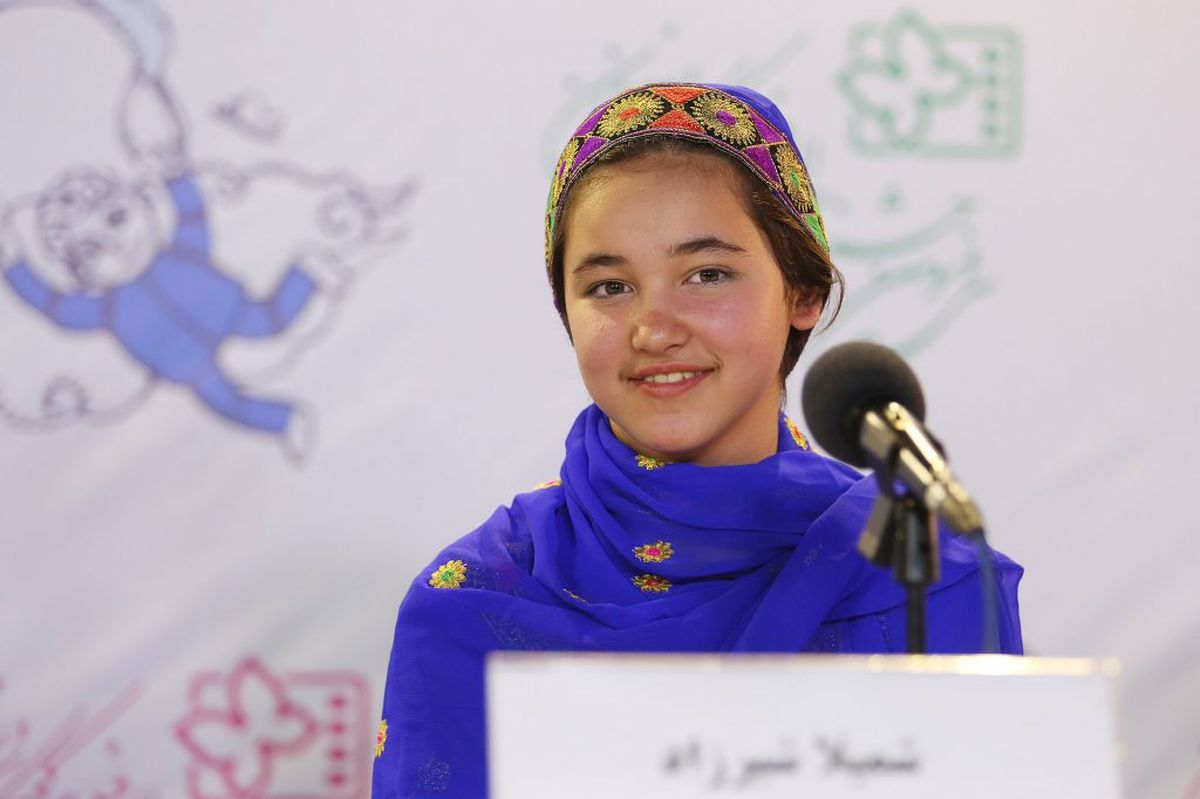
Shamila Shirzad, actress

Some well-known Hazara actors and actresses are Hussain Sadiqi, Abid Ali Nazish, Shamila Shirzad, Nikbakht Noruz, and others.

=== Sports ===
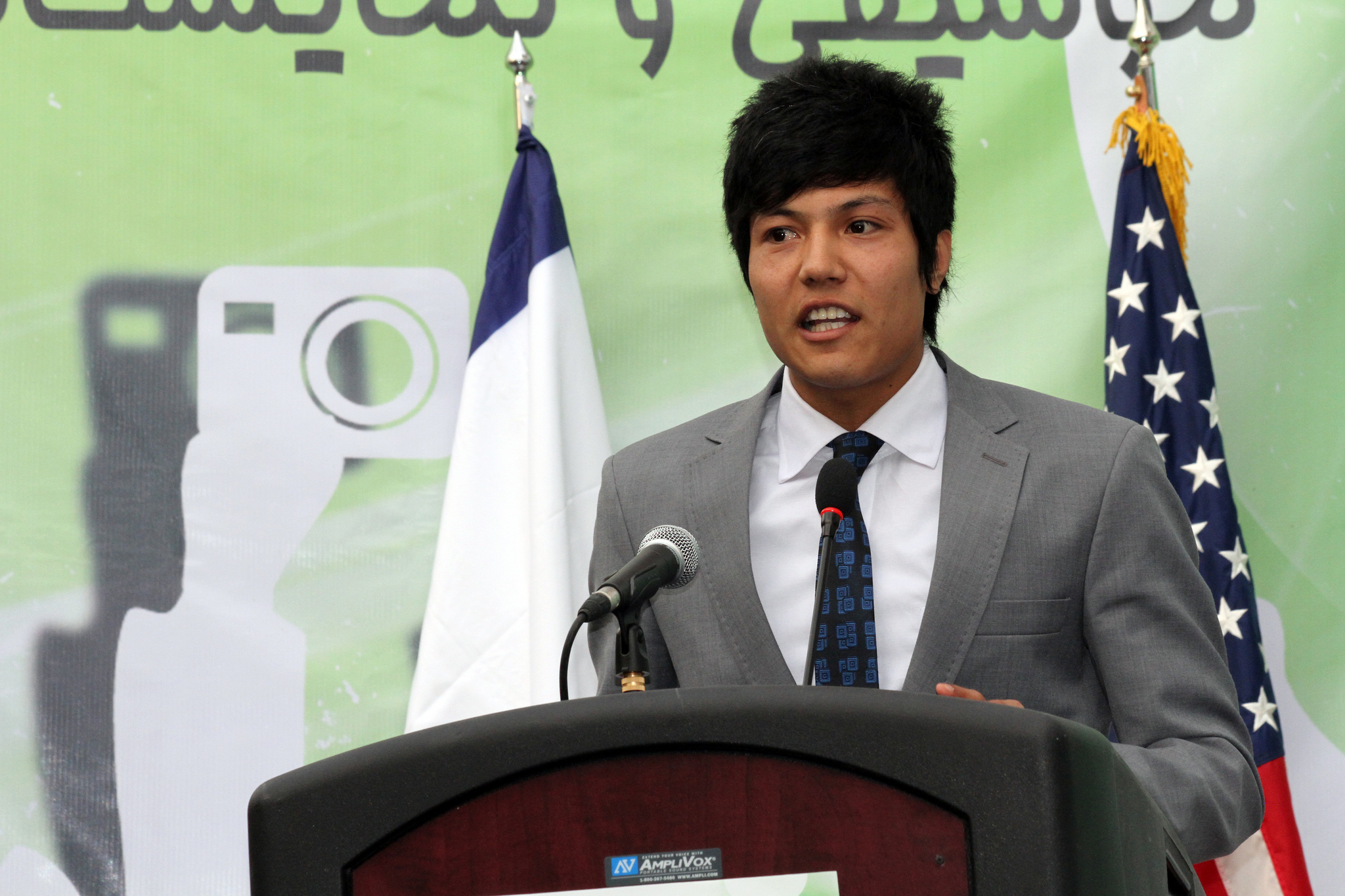
Rohullah Nikpai, two-time Olympic bronze medalist in the sport of Taekwondo

Many Hazaras engage in various sports, including football, volleyball, wrestling, martial arts, boxing, karate, taekwondo, judo, wushu, Jujitsu, cricket, tennis, and more. Pahlawan Ebrahim Khedri, a 62 kg wrestler, was the national champion in Afghanistan for two decades. Another famous Hazara wrestler, Wakil Hussain Allahdad, was killed in the suicide bombing in Dashte Barchi, Kabul, on 22 April 2018.

Rohullah Nikpai won a bronze medal in Taekwondo at the 2008 Beijing Olympics, defeating world champion Juan Antonio Ramos of Spain 4–1 in the playoff final. This achievement marked Afghanistan's first-ever Olympic medal. He then won a second Olympic medal for Afghanistan at the London 2012 Games.

Another notable Hazara athlete, Sayed Abdul Jalil Waiz, was the first badminton player to represent Afghanistan in the Asian Junior Championships in 2005, where he secured the first win for his country against Iraq with scores of 15–13 and 15–1. He has participated in several international championships since 2005, achieving victories against competitors from Australia, the Philippines, and Mongolia. Hamid Rahimi is a Hazara boxer from Afghanistan living in Germany. Hussain Sadiqi is a Hazara Australian martial artist who won an award for the best fight scene in an Australian-made action movie.

Hazara football players include Zohib Islam Amiri, who currently plays for the Afghanistan national football team; Moshtaq Yaqoubi, an Afghan-Finnish footballer who plays for HIFK; Mustafa Amini, a Hazara Australian footballer who plays as a midfielder for Danish Superliga club AGF and the Australian national team; Rahmat Akbari, an Australian footballer who plays as a midfielder for Brisbane Roar. Other notable players include Roholla Iqbalzadeh, Omran Haydary, Zelfy Nazary, Moshtaq Ahmadi, and Zahra Mahmoodi.

Some Hazaras from Pakistan have also excelled in sports and received numerous awards, particularly in boxing, football, and field hockey.

Pakistani Hazara Abrar Hussain, a former Olympic boxer, served as the deputy director-general of the Pakistan Sports Board. He represented Pakistan three times at the Olympics and won a gold medal at the 1990 Asian Games in Beijing. Another Hazara boxer from Pakistan is Haider Ali, a Commonwealth Games gold medalist and Olympian who is currently retired.

Former captain of the Pakistan national football team, Qayyum Changezi, was the second Pakistani footballer to score a hat trick in an international game. New Hazara youngsters are emerging in football in Pakistan, mostly from Quetta, including Muhammad Ali and Rajab Ali Hazara.

Another notable figure is Kulsoom Hazara, a celebrated Pakistani karate champion who has earned numerous gold, silver, and bronze medals at both national and international levels. She has also been honored with the prestigious Pride of Pakistan Award. Other notable Hazara athletes in karate include Nargis Hameedullah, who made history as the first Pakistani woman to win a bronze medal at the Asian Games in karate, and Shahida Abbasi, a gold medalist and the first Pakistani woman to represent the country internationally in kata.

=== Cultural sports ===
The cultural sports of the Hazara people are those that have been passed down through generations from their ancestors.

==== Buzkashi ====
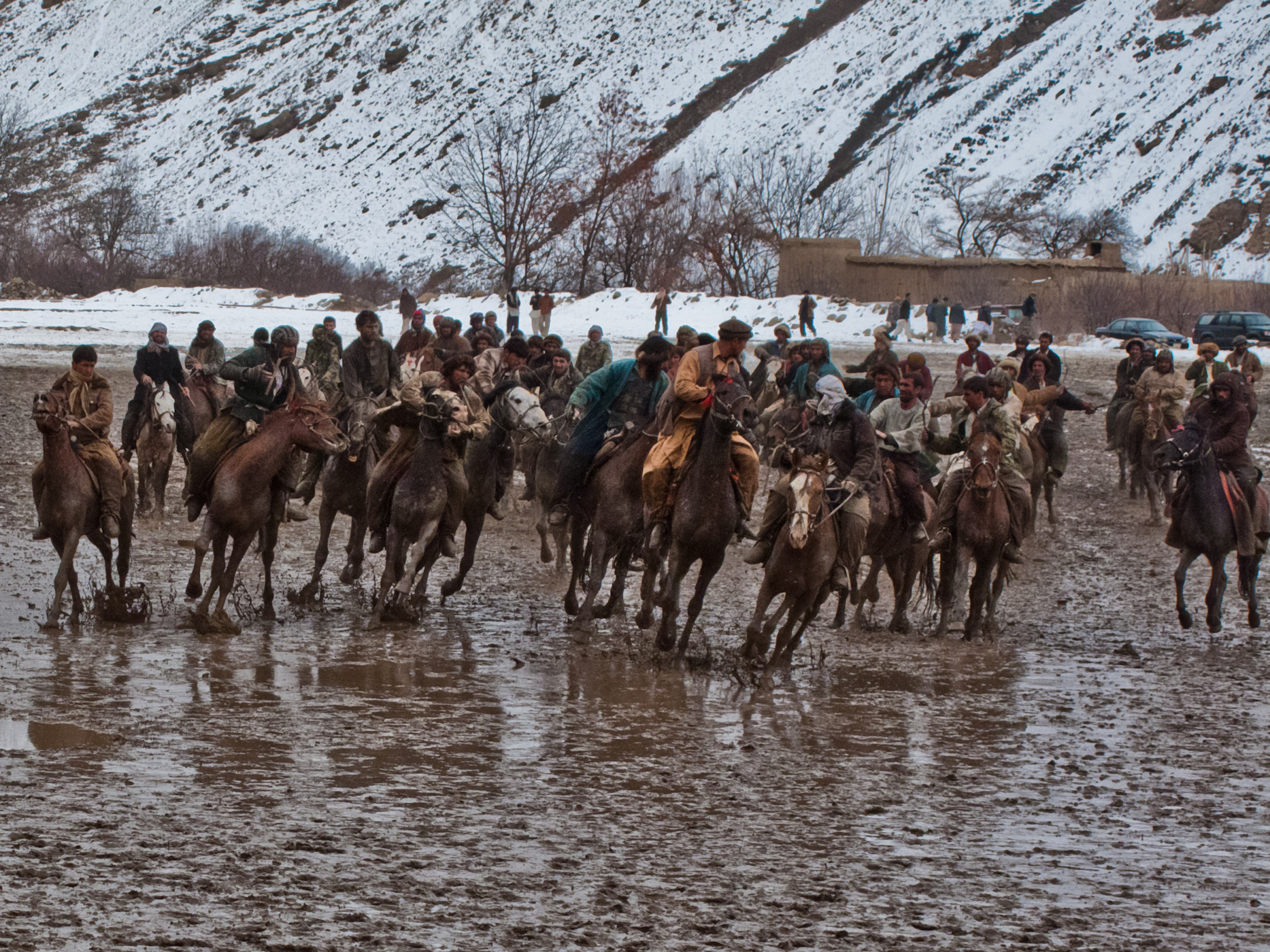
Buzkashi in Afghanistan

Buzkashi is a Central Asian sport in which horse-mounted players attempt to place a goat or calf carcass into a goal. It is the national sport of Afghanistan and is one of the cultural sports of the Hazara people, who continue to practice this sport in Afghanistan.

==== Tirandāzi ====
Tirandāzi is a form of archery and an ancient cultural sport of the Hazaras.

==== Pahlawani ====
Pahlawani, or Kushti, is a traditional wrestling sport practiced by the Hazaras. It has a long history in Afghanistan and is particularly significant among the Hazara community. During holidays, Pahlawani fields are set up for competitions, which are held across different age groups. This cultural sport features its own unique techniques. Due to its ancient roots and familiarity, Pahlawani has been passed down from generation to generation among the Hazaras.

== See also ==
- Hazara nationalism
- Ethnic groups in Afghanistan
- Demographics of Central Asia
- Aimaq Hazara
- Turco-Mongol tradition
- Turco-Persian tradition
