= 1979 Hazara Uprising =

Hazara Uprising in Hazarajat

- Part of 1979 uprisings in Afghanistan and Soviet–Afghan War
Date	1979–1981
Location	Hazarajat, Afghanistan
Result	Hazara Victory: DRA and Soviet Armed Forces forces expelled from Hazarajat; Hazaras set up a de-facto state in Hazarajat

Belligerents
Rebellion	Government

Commanders and leaders
Abdul Ali Mazari; Sayyid Ali Beheshti; Sayyid Muhammad Hasan	(Afghanistan) Nur Muhammad Taraki (1978–1979) (Afghanistan) Hafizullah Amin (1979) (Afghanistan) Babrak Karmal (1979–1981)

In late 1979, some Hazara-led parties gathered in Hazarajat to established the Shura-e-ittifaqi under the leadership of Sayyid Ali Beheshti. The uprising began and succeeded, all of Hazarajat was liberated and the Afghan government was expelled. The success of the new Hazarajat government was due to its support of the Hazara culture and values.

After the uprising, Shura-e-ittifaqi ruled the Hazarajat from 1979 to 1982 followed by Sazman-i Nasr then Hezbe Wahdat that ruled Hazarajat until 1997. During this time, Hazarajat was more peaceful than other parts of Afghanistan. The uprising was also driven by Anti-Tajik and Anti-Pashtun sentiment among some Hazaras. This was the most organized and successful Hazara uprising after several failed uprisings in the 20th century, providing the Hazaras with an organized government for the first time.

== Aftermath ==
Following the uprising, the Shura-e-ittifaqi established an Islamic government controlling the majority of Hazarajat. The Kabul government attempted to undermine the new government in Hazarajat by using techniques such as divide and rule, and manipulating ethnic and tribal disputes but these failed.

== See also ==
- Islamic Republic of Hazarajat
