= Afghan mujahideen =

Islamist resistance groups

Mujahideen
- مجاهدين
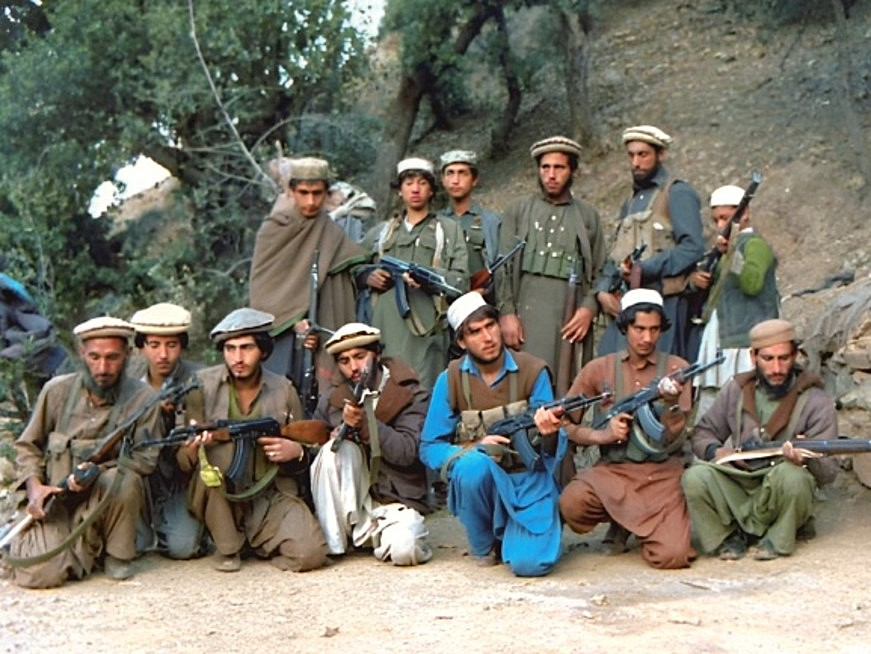
- Mujahideen of the Yunus Khalis group, 1987
- Leaders: Burhanuddin Rabbani and Ahmad Shah Massoud (Jamiat); Sibghatullah Mojaddedi (JNMA/AIG); Gulbuddin Hekmatyar (HIG); Mohammad Nabi Mohammadi (Harakat); Abdul Ali Mazari (Wahdat)
- Dates active: 1975–1992 (resistance phase); 1992–1996 (loyalist factions)
- Split to: Northern Alliance; Taliban
- Country: Afghanistan
- Allegiance: Afghan interim government (1988–1992)
- Groups: Peshawar Seven: Jamiat-i Islami; Hizb-i Islami (Gulbuddin); Hezb-i Islami Khalis; Ittihad-i Islami; Harakat-i Inqilab-i Islami; Jabha-i Nejat-i Milli; Mahaz-i Milli; Octet Party: Hezbollah Afghanistan; Islamic Victory Organization of Afghanistan; Afghan Revolutionary Guard Corps; Islamic Movement of Afghanistan; Revolutionary Council of Islamic Unity of Afghanistan; Islamic Revolution Movement; Union of Islamic Fighters for Islam in Afghanistan; Thunder Party; Other factions: ALO; Sharafat Kuh Front; Harakat-e-Mulavi; Settam-e-Melli
- Headquarters: Peshawar, Pakistan (Sunni-based leadership); Tehran, Iran (Shiite-based leadership)
- Active regions: Afghanistan; Pakistan
- Ideology: Factions: Islamism; Anti-communism; Anti-imperialism; Anti-Sovietism; Maoism; Socialism
- Political position: Big tent
- Wars: Soviet–Afghan War; Afghan Civil War

The Afghan mujahideen (Note: English: /mʊdʒəhəˈdiːn/ muu-jə-hə-DEEN; Pashto: افغان مجاهدين, romanized: Afǧān mujāhidin, pronounced [ɐvˈɣɑn mʊdʒɑhɪˈdin]; Dari: مجاهدین افغان, romanized: mujāhidīn-i Afǧān, cyrillized: муҷоҳидини Афғон, pronounced [mʊdʒɑːhɪˈdiːnɪ ɐvˈɣɑːn]) or mujahidin were Islamist militant groups that fought against the Afghanistan government and the Soviet Union during the Soviet–Afghan War and the subsequent Afghan Civil War.

The term mujahid (from Arabic مجاهد [muˈdʒaːhid]) is used in a religious context by Muslims to refer to those engaged in a struggle of any nature for the sake of Islam, commonly referred to as jihad (جهاد [dʒiˈhaːd]). The Afghan mujahideen consisted of numerous groups that differed from each other across ethnic and ideological lines, but were united by their anti-communist and Islamist goals. The coalition of anti-Soviet Muslim militias was also known as the "Afghan resistance", and the Western press widely referred to the Afghan guerrillas as "freedom fighters", or "Mountain Men".

The militants of the Afghan mujahideen were recruited and organized immediately after the Soviet Union invaded Afghanistan in 1979, initially from the regular Afghan population and defectors from the Afghan military, with the aim of waging an armed struggle against both the communist government of the People's Democratic Party of Afghanistan, which had taken power in the 1978 Saur Revolution, and the Soviet Union, which had invaded the country in support of the former. There were many ideologically different factions among the mujahideen, with the most influential being the Jamiat-e Islami and Hezb-e Islami Gulbuddin parties. The Afghan mujahideen were generally divided into two distinct alliances: the larger and more significant Sunni Islamic union collectively referred to as the "Peshawar Seven", based in Pakistan, and the smaller Shia Islamic union collectively referred to as the "Octed Party", based in Iran; as well as independent units that referred to themselves as "mujahideen". The "Peshawar Seven" alliance received heavy assistance from the United States (Operation Cyclone), Pakistan, Saudi Arabia, Turkey, the United Kingdom, as well as other countries and private international donors.

The basic units of the mujahideen continued to reflect the highly decentralized nature of Afghan society and strong loci of competing Pashtun tribal groups, which had formed a union with other Afghan groups under intense American, Saudi Arabian and Pakistani pressure. The alliance sought to function as a united diplomatic front towards the international community, and sought representation in the United Nations and the Organisation of the Islamic Conference. The Afghan mujahideen also saw thousands of volunteers from various Muslim countries come to Afghanistan to aid the resistance. The majority of the international fighters came from the Arab world, and later became known as Afghan Arabs; the most well-known Arab financier and militant of the group during this period was Osama bin Laden, who would later found al-Qaeda and mastermind the September 11 attacks on the United States. Other international fighters from the Indian subcontinent became involved in terrorist activities in Kashmir and against the states of Bangladesh and Myanmar during the 1990s.

The mujahideen guerrillas fought a long and costly war against the Soviet military, which withdrew from the country in 1989, after which the rebels' war against the communist Afghan government continued. The loosely-aligned mujahideen took the capital city of Kabul in 1992 following the collapse of the Moscow-backed government. However, the new mujahideen government that was formed by the Peshawar Accords following these events was quickly fractured by rival factions and became severely dysfunctional. This unrest quickly escalated into a second civil war, which saw the large-scale collapse of the united Afghan mujahideen and the victorious emergence of the Taliban, which established the Islamic Emirate of Afghanistan shortly after taking most of the country in 1996. The Taliban were ousted in 2001 following the U.S.-led invasion during the war in Afghanistan, but they regrouped and ultimately retook control of the country in 2021.

== Origins and formation ==
Certain organisations that would later form the mujahideen had already existed, such as Jamiat-e Islami in 1972 and Hezb-e Islami in 1976, as militias and paramilitary groups. The two organizations first took part in the 1975 Panjshir Valley and Laghman uprisings, and perpetrated acid attacks on women who were unveiled.

Groups of resistance formed in parts of eastern Afghanistan by the fall of 1978, but it was in early 1979 that the situation rapidly escalated to open rebellion. As early as February 2, 1979, it was reported that Afghan dissidents were receiving guerilla training across the border in Pakistan. The conflict reached a height during the Herat mutiny in March, in which a non-organized group of Afghan army mutineers from the 17th Division and the civilians rebelled and briefly overthrew the city garrison. The incident and subsequent air bombardment gave indications of a looming civil war. Sibghatullah Mojaddedi, a leader of Islamic mysticism and a hazrat, was one of the original leaders of an organized anti-government armed group. He created an organization named the Afghan National Liberation Front (Jabha-i Nejat-i Milli) and on May 25, 1979, appealed for support in New York City. Sayyed Ahmad Gailani, a spiritual leader (pir), also created a resistance organization during this time, called National Islamic Front (Mahaz-e-Millie-Islami). Mawlawi Mohammad Nabi Mohammadi, a religious scholar and former member of parliament in the Kingdom, formed the Revolutionary Islamic Movement (Harakat-e-Inqilab-e-Islami); he was well known for assaulting prominent leftist Babrak Karmal inside the House of Representatives in 1966. On August 11, 1979, the Afghan National Liberation Front along with three others groups (Jamiat-i Islami, Hezb-i Islami Khalis, and Revolutionary Islamic Movement) formed a new organization based in Peshawar, Pakistan, aiming to establish an Islamic Republic. Other rebel movements were also active throughout the country, including Hazara tribes that had some 5,000 men as of August 1979.

A broad mujahidin had existed as a de facto political bloc since May 1979, when the Pakistani government decided to limit the flow of financial aid to the said seven organizations, thus cutting off monetary supply to nationalist and left-wing resistance groups.

The Soviet operation of December 1979 turned the civil war into a war of liberation, and the jihad was more forceful than previous Afghan empires had fought against the British and the Sikhs. Except for pockets of supporters of the DRA regime, almost every social, religious and ethnic group protested the Soviet action (despite their removal of the tyrannical Khalq regime), and even religious minorities of Afghan Sikhs and Hindus covertly assisted the mujahidin. Following the exodus of Afghans to Pakistan in 1980, as many as 84 different resistance groups were formed in Peshawar. A coalition of the resistance with a united front for military activities was demanded by Afghan refugees during meetings in Peshawar in 1980. They, including tribal and community elders, former members of parliament and mujahidin commanders, met in several loya jirgas (traditional grand assembly) to solidify the resistance, liberate Afghanistan from the Soviet Union, topple the Kabul regime, and create a single political bloc. Mojaddedi took part in these, and the first jirga passed a resolution on February 21, 1980. The last round of the jirga in May 1980 set up the Islamic National Revolutionary Council, headed by Mohammad Omar Babrakzay as acting president. It advocated for a national, Islamic, and democratic republic. The pressure persuaded leaders of the Islamic groups to make attempts to unite. A coalition of the three Islamist and three traditionalist organizations, the Islamic Union for the Liberation of Afghanistan, was formed, headed by Abdul Rasul Sayyaf. However, it did not last, as Gulbuddin Hekmatyar's group (Hizb-i Islami Gulbuddin) and later the three traditionalist groups seceded from it. These three set up the Union of the Three. The Islamic Union later called the tribal Revolutionary Council an "enemy".

Because of disunity, elders from western Afghanistan attempted to hold a loya jirga, citing that party politics disunited the resisting Afghans. Political Islamists warned against people attending the jirga, but it was held safely in September 1981 in Pishin, Pakistan, consisting of tribal elders, the Ulama, and military officers. Elders native from Nangarhar proposed that the former Afghan king, Mohammed Zahir Shah, would be an ideal "National Leader" in any coalition. However, Pakistan, which preferred a divided Afghan resistance, was against the return of the former king to Afghanistan, seeing it as a symbol of Afghan nationalism.

== Groups ==
There were seven major mujahidin groups as recognized by Pakistan and its allies, based in Peshawar and sometimes called the Peshawar Seven. They were often categorized into the fundamentalist and traditional; the fundamentalist factions were militarily stronger in the war.

Political Islamist

- Jamiat-i Islami (Islamic Society of Afghanistan), a mostly Tajik faction headed by Burhanuddin Rabbani, a former professor of theology at Kabul University, advocating for a semi-democratic Islamic revolutionary state - one of the most notable and strongest of the mujahideen factions
- Hizb-i Islami (Gulbuddin) (Islamic Party), a radical, oppositionist faction headed by Gulbuddin Hekmatyar who enjoyed the largest amount of ISI Pakistan funding, Saudi intelligence funding, and American CIA funding; traditionally strongest in Ghilzai Pashtun tribal regions in the south-east - aimed for a state similar to that founded and led by Khomeini in Iran
- Hezb-i Islami Khalis (Islamic Party), a splinter faction headed by theologian Mohammad Yunus Khalis, with its supporter base having been Ghilzai Pashtuns - favored cooperation with other factions
- Ittihad-i Islami (Islamic Union (for the liberation of Afghanistan)), a faction advocating for Wahhabism, led by fundamentalist Abdul Rasul Sayyaf and funded by Saudi Arabia; smaller than the other parties, but influential in international recruitment for the jihad

Afghan traditionalist

- Harakat-i Inqilab-i Islami (Revolutionary Islamic Movement (of Afghanistan)), a Pashtun faction led by Mohammad Nabi Mohammadi, a religious figure and former member of parliament, and gaining support among Pashtun tribes in the south
- Jabha-i Nejat-i Milli ((Afghan) National Liberation Front), headed by the Sufi order Sibghatullah Mojaddedi, a monarchist faction that favored the return of Afghanistan's ousted King, Zahir Shah, in a traditional Islamic state with a parliamentary democracy; it was said to be the weakest militarily, although with a respected leader
- Mahaz-i Milli (National (Islamic) Front), the most secular, pro-Western and liberal of the mujahidin factions, rejecting both communism and Islamic fundamentalism, instead adhering to Pashtun nationalism, democracy and a return of the monarchy; led by Sayid Ahmad Gailani, an Islamic mystical figure, and supported by a number of tribal leaders

=== Commanders ===
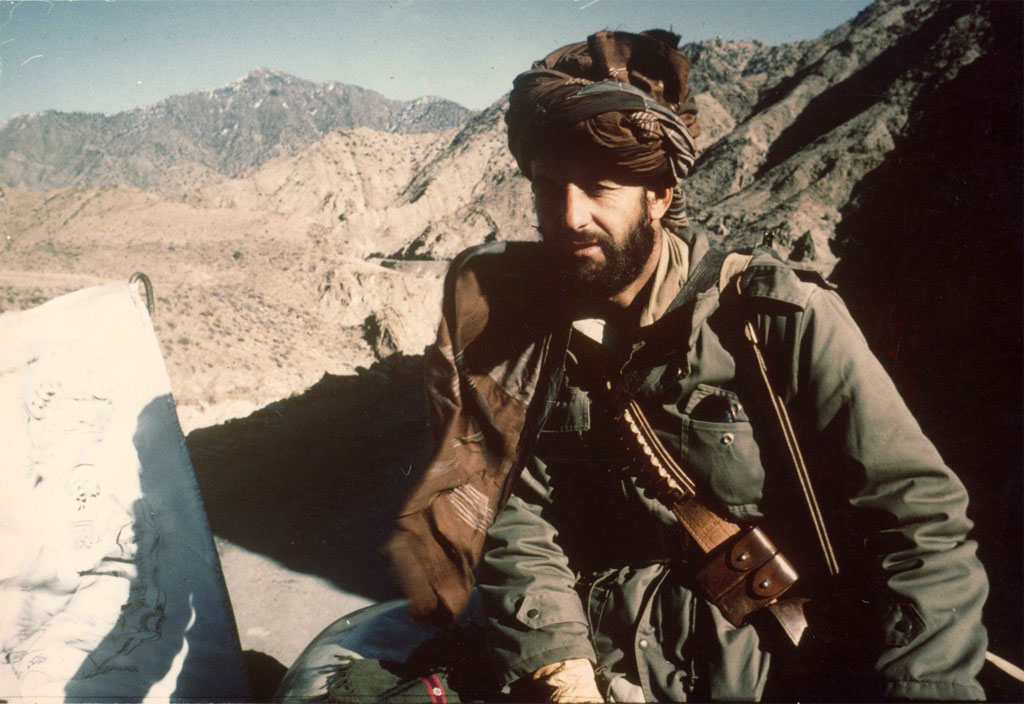
Amin Wardak, a mujahidin commander of Maidan Wardak Province

Some of the group leaders also acted as commanders, such as Khalis and Hekmatyar. The other notable mujahidin commanders were Ahmad Shah Massoud (Jamiat-i Islami), Abdul Haq (Hizb-i Islami Khalis), Ismail Khan (Jamiat-i Islami), Jalaluddin Haqqani (Hizb-i Islami Khalis), Amin Wardak (Mahaz-e Melli) and Mohammad Zabihullah (Jamiat-i Islami).

=== Ideologies and divisions ===
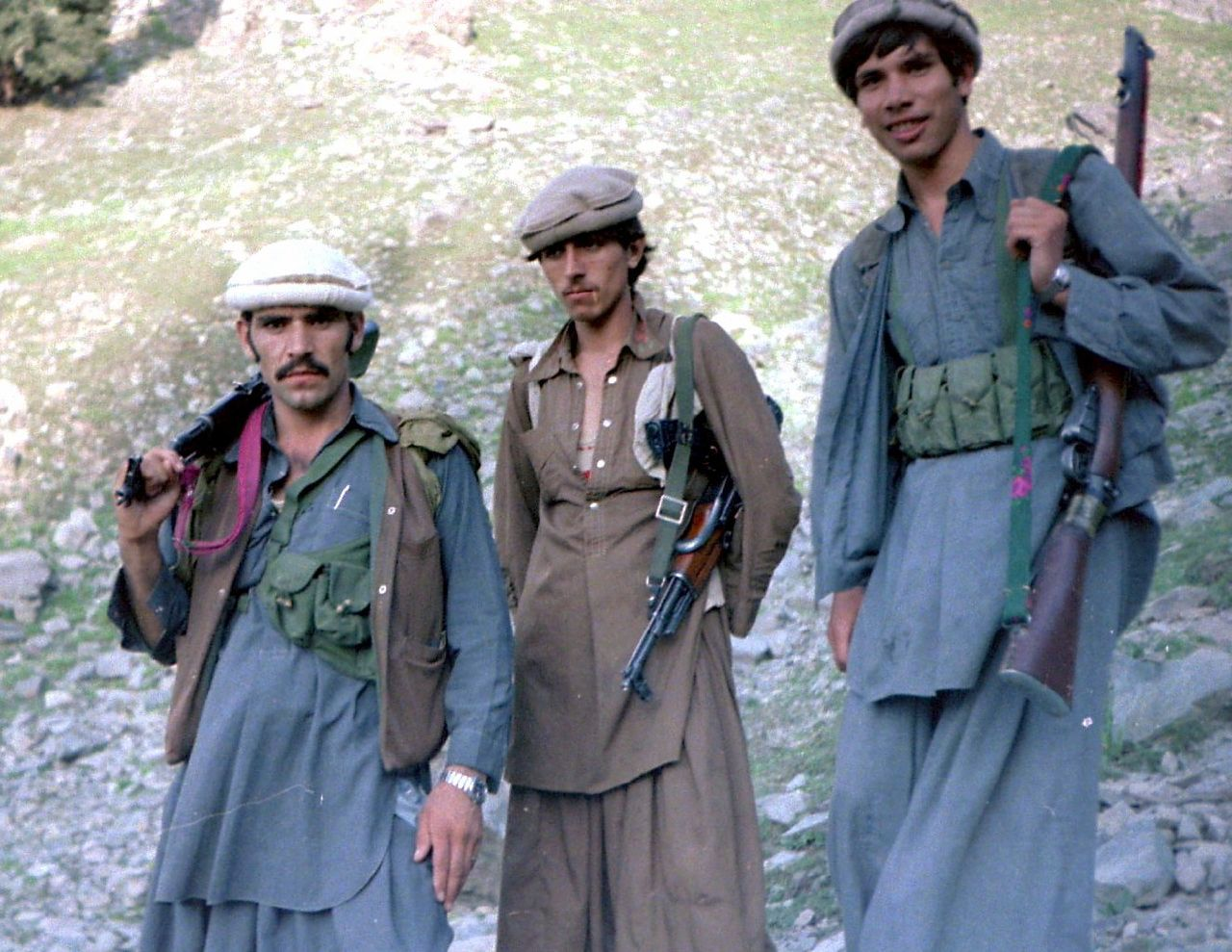
Mujahidin guerillas in Kunar Province, Afghanistan, 1985

The Afghan mujahideen were not a united movement. The resistance parties remained deeply divided along ethnic, ideological and personal lines, despite internal and external pressures to unite. Dutch journalist Jere Van Dyk reported in 1981 that the guerillas were effectively fighting two civil wars: one against the regime and the Soviets, and another among themselves. Gulbuddin Hekmatyar's Hizb-i Islami was most cited as the initiator of cross-mujahidin clashes. Through the years, there were various efforts to create a united front, but all were either non-effective or failed in a short time. At least three different iterations of an "Islamic Unity of Afghan Mujahedin" (IUAM) were tried, none of which lasted. The formation of the Afghanistan Interim Government (AIG) in 1988 also failed to promote unity. Additionally, it only included the select Sunni Muslim groups approved by Pakistan; Shi'ite groups backed by Iran and pro-Chinese (anti-Soviet) leftist groups were excluded.

Some mujahideen warlords also regularly engaged in acts of pedophilia, such as the practice of Bacha bazi, keeping one or more boys for personal servitude, sexual pleasure and using them to a display power and social status. The practice was outlawed under the government of the Democratic Republic of Afghanistan and carried the death penalty.

Mujahideen leader Mohammad Yunus Khalis thought that the lack of trust among the various leaders was a factor for the many disunited organizations. Numerous mujahideen commanders additionally regarded schools and its teachers as legitimate targets for attacks, with their justification being that the PDPA's leftist ideology was taught in educational institutions to students.

The only party fighting the Soviets was the Harakat-i Inqilab-i Islami. The others were all fighting each other.

— Eduard Lagourge, French aid worker in Afghanistan, 1988

The issue of the exiled king, Mohammed Zahir Shah, also caused divisions. Zahir Shah enjoyed considerable popularity among the Afghan refugees in Pakistan. Both Hekmatyar and Khalis were strongly against the king, while Gailani, Mojaddedi and Mohammadi supported an interim coalition with him. Rabbani and Sayyaf were initially against a role for the king, later changing their minds.

Although the Afghan mujahidin were praised for bravery in resisting a superpower, the lack of unity showed weaknesses in the guerillas, such as the lack of a clear political strategy.

In an attempt to dissuade infighting and develop a de facto functioning proto state, Ahmad Shah Massoud created the Shura-e Nazar in 1984, an offshoot of the Jamiat faction. Shura-e Nazar was created as a military–political combination and consisted of an organized structure dealing with health and education in the areas it operated in (northern and north-eastern Afghanistan).

==== Attempts at unity ====
In 1981, the Islamist groups formed a broader alliance, the Union of the Seven, made up of the three Islamist groups, the newly formed organization led by Sayyaf, and three splinter groups. But many differences remained between them. In 1985, under pressure from the king of Saudi Arabia – which was a major donor to the mujahidin – a more broad coalition was created, named Islamic Unity of Afghan Mujahidin (IUAM), comprising the four main Islamist and three moderate groups. It was also nicknamed the Seven Party Mujahidin Alliance, the Peshawar Seven, and the Seven Dwarves.

Afghan Interim Government
- Provisional government in exile of Afghanistan
- Date formed: 1988
- Date dissolved: 28 April 1992

People and organisations
- President: Sibghatullah Mojaddedi
- Prime Minister: Abdul Rasul Sayyaf

History
- Successor: Islamic State of Afghanistan

In 1989, under the patronage of Pakistan and Saudi Arabia, an Afghan Interim Government (AIG) was formed in Pakistan to coincide with the withdrawal of Soviet troops from Afghanistan. The Interim Government had been in exile in Pakistan since 1988. The Interim Government was headed by traditionalist Sibghatullah Mojaddedi, with orthodox Abdul Rasul Sayyaf as prime minister, the AIG represented itself as a government in exile and a legitimate incoming state following the Soviet withdrawal. The two individuals proved popular, despite not being leaders of major groups, with Sayyaf said to have had exceptional ability in solving issues. However, the AIG was weak, as it only included the Peshawar Seven and not nationalists or tribal elders. After the Soviet withdrawal, the AIG attempted to establish itself within Afghan territory – the mujahidin and Pakistani forces attacked the city of Jalalabad in March 1989, visioning a final victory towards Kabul, but were disastrously defeated by the Afghan Army. The rivalry between Hekmatyar and the Jamiat-i Islami only increased, leading to Hekmatyar's resignation from the AIG. He eventually decided to go at the Kabul regime in a very different way: a coalition with Khalq communists of General Shahnawaz Tanai, which caused many resignations in his party in protest. Together, they launched a coup attempt in 1990 to oust the Parchamite Mohammed Najibullah, but failed.

=== Other resistance groups ===
==== Shi'ite groups ====
A number of Shia militia groups also operated, mainly in central Afghanistan populated by ethnic Hazaras. These groups were also, similarly, divided between themselves. Sayyid Ali Beheshti's Shura-i Inqilab-i Ittifaq, a traditionalist group, controlled the Hazarajat at first, but pro-Iran Khomeinist groups challenged them and took control of the region from them. By the mid-1980s the strongest of these was Sazman-i Nasr, while Shura-i Inqilab-i Ittifaq was prominent only in Maidan Wardak. They united as the "Octet Party" in 1987 (called so due to Iranian support). In 1989, most of these merged into one group, Hezb-e Wahdat (except for the Islamic Movement of Afghanistan and Hezbollah Afghanistan).

==== Maoist groups ====
There were also Maoist militias that fought against the Soviets and the Afghan regime, as well as the Mujahidin. They were initially well organized and carried out attacks in Kabul; the KGB then had a policy of clearing Kabul of any pro-Chinese elements. A mild suspicion from KHAD was enough to put someone in prison by accusing them of being a pro-Chinese communist. The People's Republic of China, which was a backer of the main Pakistan-based Mujahidin, was either unable or unwilling to help the Afghan Maoists. Majid Kalakani, a prominent figure and leader of the Liberation Organization of the People of Afghanistan (SAMA), was executed by the Afghan regime in June 1980. Members of Shola-e Javid ("Eternal Flame") were involved in fighting the government and mujahidin (particularly Hezb-i Islami). The Babrak Karmal government arrested many of its members in June 1981.

==== Smaller groups ====
Smaller mujahidin groups not connected to the main seven parties include the Sharafat Kuh Front in Farah Province and Harakat-e-Mulavi. Additionally a Baloch nationalist group operated called the Nimruz Front.

The Settam-e-Melli was a small long-time splinter faction of the PDPA based in Badakhshan Province that fought against the regime and other Mujahidin. They were driven out of Panjshir Valley by Massoud's mujahidin forces in 1981. By 1983 its resistance seemed to have ceased as it appeared to join the Karmal government.

The Afghan Social Democratic Party (Afghan Mellat), formed in the 1960s, also resisted in the early days of the war. It was treated as a pariah by the recognized Peshawar-based mujahidin groups. Its guerilla band was heavily damaged in September 1980 following an attack by Hekmatyar's mujahidin forces. The regime in Kabul neutralized an Afghan Mellat unit in the city in 1983.

== Equipment ==
Most of the Mujahidin's weapons were of Soviet design; this includes mostly those that were supplied by their funders and smaller numbers that were captured from the Soviet or Afghan militaries. It was disclosed in 1981 that recoilless rifles (Chinese 83mm, Blo, 70mm) were being used by the resistance. Also in use were Soviet 82 mm mortars, British mortars and Chinese Type 63 mortars. Twin barrelled Chinese-built Type 58s has been seen in smaller numbers. Lee–Enfield rifles, Egyptian made AKMs, and Chinese made SKSs have also been used by them.

Beginning in 1985, they began to receive heavy equipment like bazookas and heavy machine guns, while also receiving better equipment for the cold winters, such as snow boots and ski tents. The raised fundings or assistance from the United States, China and Saudi Arabia all contributed to strengthening the Mujahidin movement by 1987.

The portable surface-to-air "Stinger" missile was first used by Mujahedin in September 1986 and is considered by some to have been a turning point in the war. Some military analysts considered it a "game changer" coined the term "Stinger effect" to describe it. However, these statistics are based on Mujahedin self-reporting, which is of unknown reliability. A Russian general however claimed the United States "greatly exaggerated" Soviet and Afghan aircraft losses during the war.

== Allies and funding ==
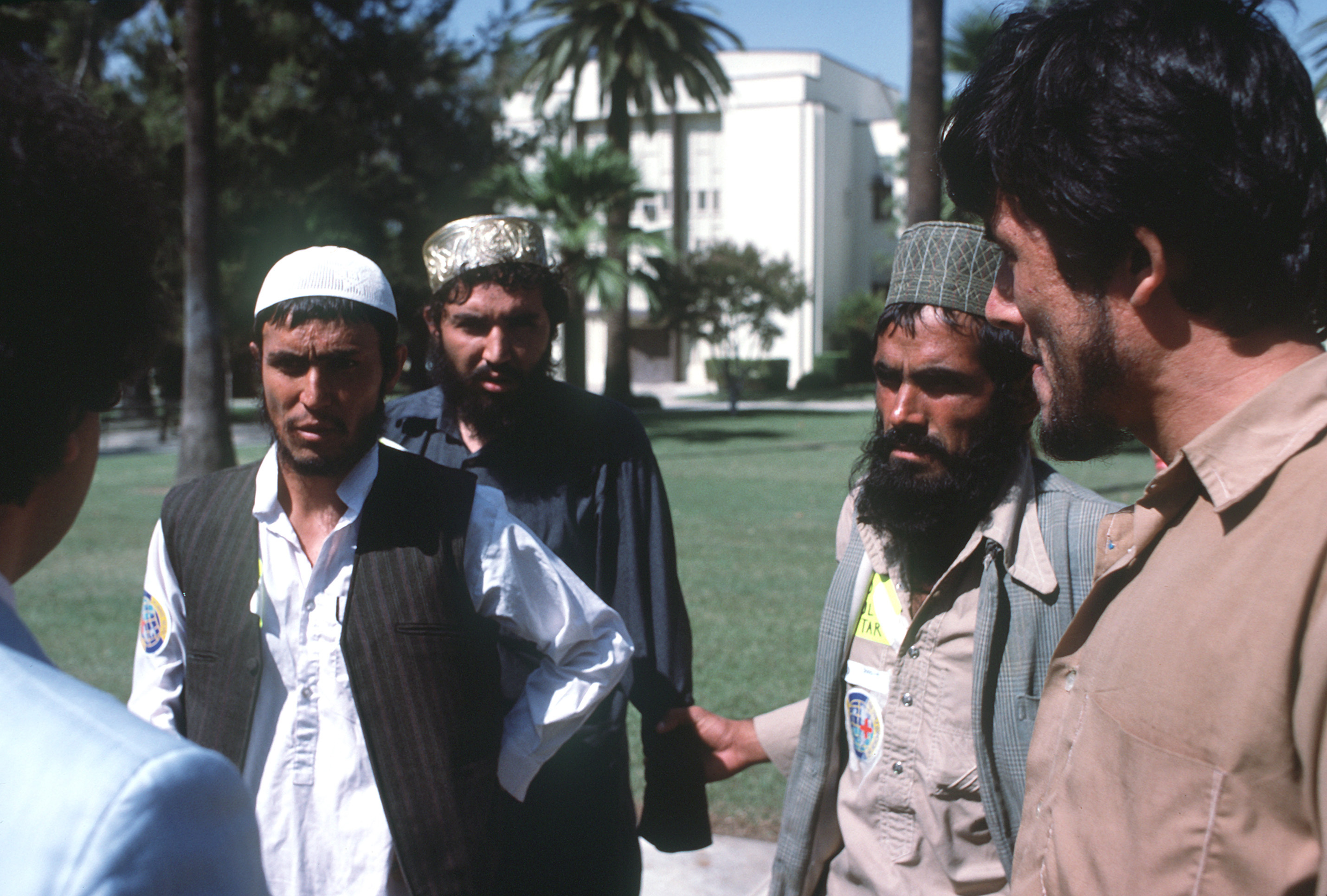
Wounded Afghan guerillas having arrived at Norton Air Force Base, the United States, for medical treatment, 1986

The mujahidin were heavily backed by Pakistan (through the Inter-Services Intelligence) and the United States (through the Central Intelligence Agency), also receiving backing primarily from Saudi Arabia and the People's Republic of China, while more covert support came from the United Kingdom, Egypt, and West Germany (through the Federal Intelligence Service). The Hezb-i Islami Gulbuddin faction received the lion's share of weapons from the ISI and CIA.While Ahmad Shah Massoud's group was supported by Britain's MI6 and trained and supplied by the SAS. Britain's support to the Afghan resistance turned out to be Whitehall's most extensive covert operation since the Second World War. The CIA's Operation Cyclone was said to be its "largest and 'most successful' covert operation ever." Pakistan controlled which rebels received assistance: the four "fundamentalist" factions received most of the funding. A large amount of funding also came from private donors and charities from the Arab states of the Persian Gulf.

== Areas of activity ==
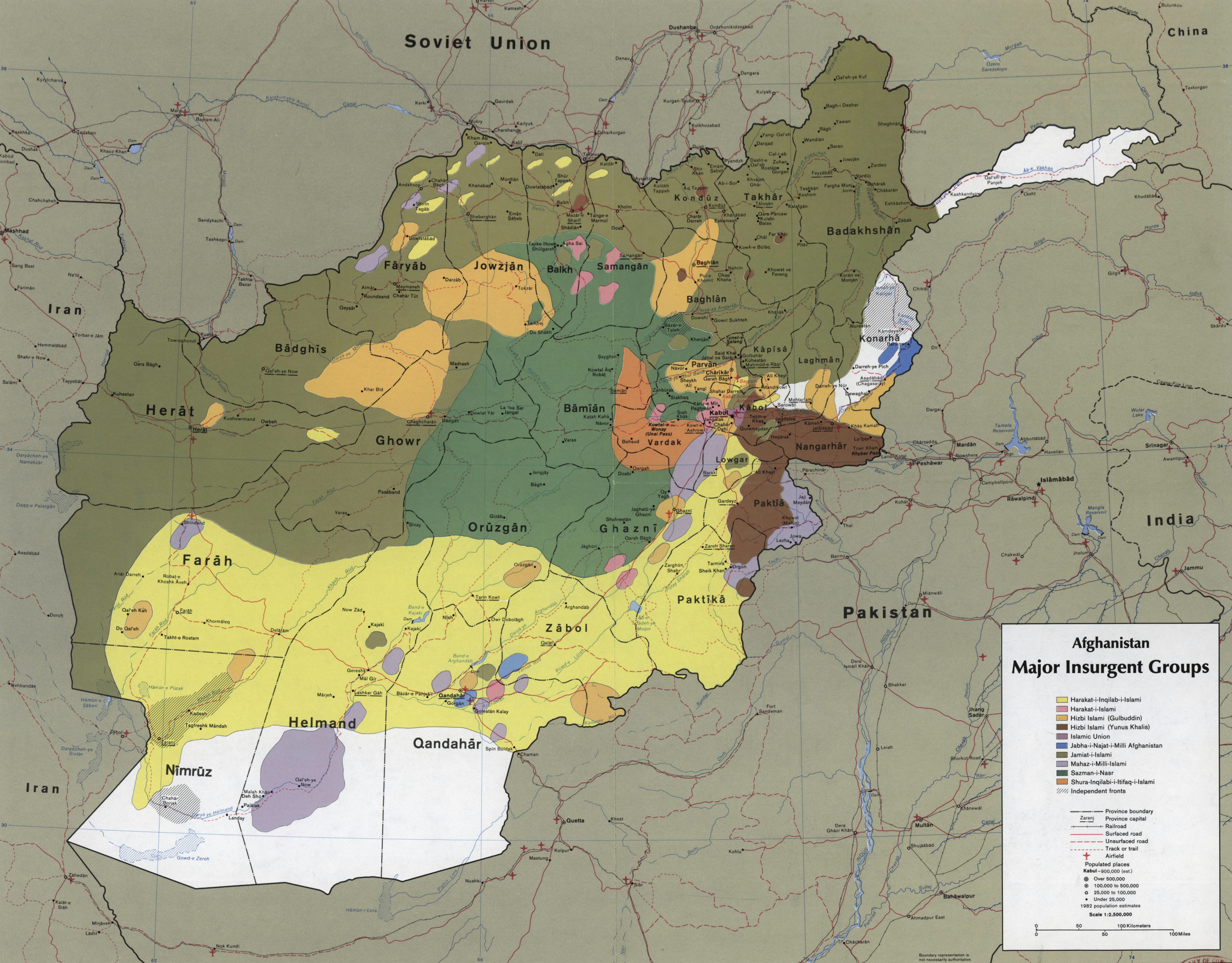
The areas where different mujahideen forces were operating in 1985

By May 1980, mujahidin controlled virtually all of rural Afghanistan, and these regions were cleared of Khalqists and Parchamites. With the exception of parts of the north near the Soviet border under Abdul Rashid Dostum's command, along with several cities, mujahidin guerillas were in control of most of the country as of 1987.

As of 1985, the Jamiat-i Islami held the most territory, stretching from Herat in the west through the north to Badakhshan in the north-east. Harakat-i Inqilab also held a large amount of territory in the southern provinces, stretching from Nimroz to Logar. Hizb-i Islami Khalis had its stronghold around Nangarhar and Paktia, while Hizb-i Islami Gulbuddin held many pockets of territory throughout the country. The Mahaz-i-Milli was prominent in Loya Paktia but also had territory in other parts of the country.

As Soviet forces withdrew in 1988–89, the Mujahidin captured several key districts, towns and provincial capitals, such as Taloqan, Mahmud Raqi, Asadabad, Bamyan, Spin Boldak, Dara-i-Suf and Imam Sahib. The cities of Kunduz, Qalat, and Maidan Shahr also fell to the Mujahidin in the summer of 1988, but were retaken by the government with Soviet bombardment and logistical support.

By the time Soviet forces completed their withdrawal, the Afghan government held only sixty urban centers and the Mujahidin controlled six entire provinces. However, the Mujahidin were unable to seize the country's major cities for several years, due to the lack of coordination between the various groups and the lack of heavy firepower necessary for such actions. The Afghan Army beat back the Mujahidin's attempts to take the city of Jalalabad in March 1989, and the civil war settled into a stalemate for three years.

== Role of women ==
Women also played a part in the Afghan mujahideen, often traveling with them to cook food or wash their clothes, but also taking part in weapons smuggling. There were many female sympathisers who encouraged their husbands, sons or other male family members to take part in the war against the Soviet occupation and the Afghan government. However, women in Afghanistan were split between the two sides, with many also supporting the Democratic Republic where they enjoyed social privileges. The split was only deepened as some factions of the Afghan mujahideen reportedly captured Afghan women to keep as slaves, according to a 1992 Press-Republican newspaper. Female refugees also created and recited Landays (traditional Afghan poems) about the war.

There is one recorded female mujahideen warlord, Bibi Ayesha (nicknamed Kaftar, meaning "Hyena"), who operated in Baghlan Province.

== Soviet withdrawal and civil war ==
On 14 April 1988, the governments of Afghanistan and Pakistan signed the Geneva Accords, guaranteed by the United States and Soviet Union. This committed the Soviet Union to withdraw all its troops from Afghanistan by 15 February 1989. The withdrawal was conducted in two phases. The first half of the contingent was removed between 15 May and 16 August 1988, and the second half after 15 November 1988. As the Soviets withdrew, they left the Afghan army in fortified positions and even helped them conduct counteroffensives, in order to leave them in as strong a position as possible. The withdrawal was completed on schedule, with commander Boris Gromov of the 40th Army being the last Soviet soldier to leave Afghanistan. The mujahideen themselves suffered heavy losses in the war against the USSR; according to preliminary estimates, 90,000 fighters died. After the Soviet withdrawal, most of the Afghan mujahidin continued its fight against the government of Mohammad Najibullah, which continued to receive funding from Moscow, while similarly the Mujahidin was also still receiving funding from Washington and Islamabad.

Despite initial estimates, the Mujahidin proved unable to topple Najibullah's regime immediately after the Soviet withdrawal. The government concentrated its forces in defense of key cities, while relying on vast amounts of military and humanitarian aid from the Soviet Union to stay afloat. Soviet military advisors were still present in Afghanistan, helping advise the war effort and even coordinate air strikes. Soviet volunteers operated the Scud missiles which gave the government an advantage in firepower. The Afghan Air Force, supplied and maintained with Soviet support, proved to be a crucial asset in keeping the government in power. As late as December 1991, Soviet pilots were recorded flying bombing missions against the Mujahidin.

The Mujahidin's divisions and factionalism hindered their war effort, and skirmishes between rival groups became common. Massoud was one of the most active elements in this time. In both 1990 and 1991 he staged spring offensives, capturing several cities and steadily expanding the territory under his influence. The government meanwhile came to rely heavily on tribal militias to stay in power, primarily the Jowzjani militia of Abdul Rashid Dostum. After 1989, these were the only forces capable of offensives against the Mujahidin.

By the summer of 1990, the Afghan government forces were on the defensive again, and by the beginning of 1991 the government controlled only 10 percent of Afghanistan. In March 1991, Mujahidin forces captured the city of Khost ending an eleven-year siege. After the failed coup d'état attempt by hardliners in the Soviet Union in August 1991, Soviet support to Najibullah's government dried up. This effectively doomed it, as the Afghan Air Force could no longer fly due to fuel shortages. Consequently, the Army's desertion rate skyrocketed. In March 1992, Dostum's militiamen defected to Massoud after negotiations, and Najibullah's regime fell shortly afterwards.

In 1991, some factions of the Mujahidin were deployed in Kuwait to fight Iraq. After Hekmatyar and Sayyaf publicly denounced the U.S. and the Saudi royal family for their role in the Gulf War, U.S. and Saudi officials indicated that they would stop funding both commanders, but this did not happen. However, the CIA and Saudi intelligence pressured the ISI to send captured Iraqi tanks to Haqqani instead of Hekmatyar. In 1993, it was reported that some Mujahidin were deployed in the Caucasus to fight the forces of Armenia in the First Nagorno-Karabakh War. Afghan mujahidin fighters have also been reportedly involved in the civil war in Tajikistan during 1992–1993.

== Following Soviet withdrawal ==
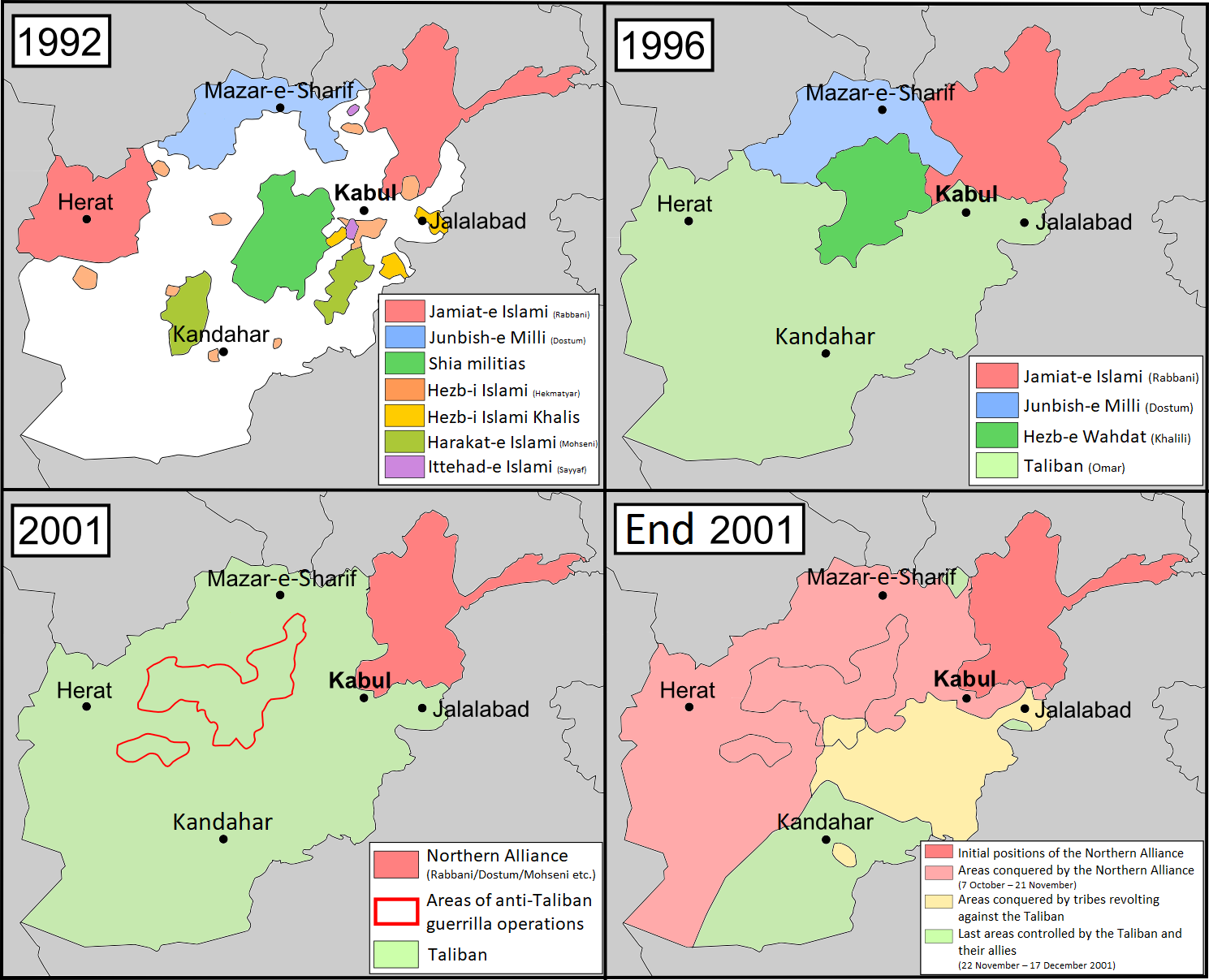
Progress of the continuing civil war between 1992 and 2001

After Najibullah's government collapsed, the Mujahidin factions (apart from Hezb-i Islami Gulbuddin) signed a power sharing agreement called the Peshawar Accord and captured Kabul on April 28, 1992, celebrating their "Victory Day". However, the divisions between the various factions were still there and it was a catalyst that led to another civil war between the new government and Mujahidin factions that rebelled against it. This meant that after 1992, various Mujahidin factions including the Shi'ite Hezb-i Wahdat continued to exist as militias rather than merely political parties, with many fighters being loyal to specific leaders.

=== Relationship with Taliban ===
The Taliban is a puritanical movement that was formed in 1994, five years after the end of the Soviet–Afghan War and in the midst of anarchy in Afghanistan. Supported by Pakistan and recruited from religious students from madrasas across the border, it won a highly effective military campaign against former Mujahidin factions in the civil war, gaining control and establishing the Islamic Emirate in 1996. Nearly all of the Taliban's original leadership fought in the Soviet–Afghan War for either the Hezb-i Islami Khalis or Harakat-i Inqilab-e Islami factions of the Mujahidin.

Veteran mujahidin leaders who fought against the Soviets were divided regarding the Taliban. Yunus Khalis was a strong supporter of the Taliban and Nabi Mohammadi also supported them, even dissolving his own organization in doing so. However, Rabbani and Sayyaf were against the Taliban and formed a new united opposition force called the Northern Alliance, which also recruited Abdul Qadeer (a commander who defected from Khalis's faction), prominent Shi'ite leaders such as Muhammad Mohaqiq, and former DRA commander Abdul Rashid Dostum. This group was supported following the United States invasion of Afghanistan in 2001 that successfully drove out the Taliban and led to the rise of Hamid Karzai.

== See also ==
- Afghanistan–Pakistan relations
- Afghanistan–United States relations

== Bibliography ==
- Giustozzi, Antonio (2000). War, Politics and Society in Afghanistan, 1978-1992. C. Hurst & Co. Publishers. ISBN 978-1-85065-396-7. LCCN 99017020.
- Kaplan, Robert D. Soldiers of God: With the Mujahidin in Afghanistan. Boston: Houghton Mifflin Company, 1990. ISBN 0-395-52132-7
- Weisman, Steven R. "Rebel Rivalry is Hampering Afghan Talks", The New York Times, March 1, 1988.
