= National Islamic Unity Party of Afghanistan =

National Islamic Unity Party of Afghanistan حزب وحدت ملی اسلامی افغانستان Hizb-i-Wahdat-i-Milli-Islami-i-Afghanistan
- Leader: Muhammad Akbari; Rohullah Loudin
- Founder: Muhammad Akbari
- Founded: Late 1994
- Split from: Hezbe Wahdat
- Ideology: Shi'a Islamism; Hazara minority rights Religious conservatism

National Islamic Unity Party of Afghanistan (Dari: حزب وحدت ملی اسلامی افغانستان) is a political party in Afghanistan led by Ustad Muhammad Akbari. Akbari broke away from Hezbe Wahdat when he struck an agreement with the Taliban, offering him a degree of control in Hazara areas.

== Foundation ==
The party emerged in the early 1990s out of a split in the Hezbe Wahdat leadership between Muhammad Akbari and Abdul Ali Mazari. Tensions between Akbari and Mazari dated back to the Soviet–Afghan War, when Akbari and Mazari had led competing factions within the overarching Tehran Eight Shiite alliance. Akbari had led the Revolutionary Guards, whilst Mazari had led the Nasr Organization. Both parties each had approximately 1,500 fighters, although Nasr had a larger support base; 4,000 compared to Akbari's 2,000. Later, in 1989, Akbari and Mazari agreed to merge their respective parties into Hezbe Wahdat, alongside the other members of the Tehran Eight.

Tensions between the various components of Hezbe Wahdat re-emerged at the parties September 1994 leadership election. Both Akbari and Mazari wished to hold the election in their own respective power bases; Hazarjat for Akbari and Kabul for Mazari. Mazari ultimately won out, and the election was held in Kabul, and saw Mazari elected leader with 43 votes in comparison to the 33 cast in favour of Akbari. The results saw Mazari elected as Secretary General whilst Akbari took over as Chairperson of Hezbe Wahdat's Central Committee. In his new position Mazari advocated in favour of maintaining Hezbe Wahdat's alliance with Hizbi-Islami and Junbish-i-Milli. In contrast Akbari, distressed at high Hazara casualties in the ongoing Battle of Kabul, advocated forming a new alliance with Jamiat-e Islami. Immediately following Akbari was accused of plotting a coup, and was rebuffed by Mazari. Within weeks of the election Akbari was running his own group, which allied with Jamiat-e Islami.

== Ideology ==
Akbari supported the Shia Family Law, which has been accused of legalizing spousal rape.

== See also ==
- List of Islamic political parties
- Hezbe Wahdat
