= Octet Party =

1987–1989 Iran-backed Afghan Shia military alliance

Tehran Eight
- Founded: 1987 (developed since 1979)
- Dissolved: 1989
- Merged into: Hezbe Wahdat
- Headquarters: Tehran, Islamic Republic of Iran
- Ideology: Shia Islamism; Anti-communism
- Political position: Right-wing
- Religion: Shi'a Islam

The Octet Party (احزاب هشتگانه) was a Shia Afghan Mujahideen political union, mainly composed of ethnic Afghan Hazaras, during the Soviet–Afghan War. They were supported were based in Iran and known as "Ahzaab Hashtganah" (the octet party).

The Octet Party were predominantly active in the Hazarajat region in central Afghanistan, and fought against the PDPA government and the supporting Soviet troops. It formed the second largest resistance force in the war, after the main Afghan mujahideen (also called the "Peshawar Seven"), which was a Sunni alliance.

The Octet Party was formed in December 1987 with the direct participation of the Iranian state, after years of inter-factional struggle in the Hazarajat. In 1989, they were united into one party, Hezb-e Wahdat, with the exception of Hezbollah Afghanistan.

== The Eight Factions ==
The following Afghan organizations composed the Octet Party, all headquartered in Iran:

Group		Year Founded	Leaders
Hezbollah Afghanistan	HA	1980	Qari Ahmad Ali Ghordarwazi
Islamic Victory Organization of Afghanistan	Al-Nasr	1980	Muhammad Hussein Sadiqi; Abdul Ali Mazari; Shaykh Shafak.
Afghan Revolutionary Guard Corps	IRGAC	1982	Sheikh Akbari; Mohsen Rezai
Islamic Movement of Afghanistan	IDA	1978	Muhammad Asif Muhsini; Shaykh Sadeq Hashemi
Revolutionary Council of Islamic Unity of Afghanistan	Shura	1979	Sayeed Ali Beheshti; Sayeed Djagran
Islamic Revolution Movement	DRI	1980	Nasrullah Mansur
Union of Islamic Fighters for Islam in Afghanistan	OBI	1980	Mosbah Sade
Thunder Party			Shaykh Sayeed Abdul Jaffar Nadiri; Muhammad Hazai; Sayeed Ismail Balkhee

== See also ==
- Hezbe Wahdat
