= Sayyid Ali Beheshti =

Afghan politician

Sayyid Ali Beheshti سید علی بهشتی
- Born: Waras District, Bamyan province, Afghanistan
- Known for: 1979 Hazara Uprising

Sayyid Ali Beheshti (Dari: سید علی بهشتی) was a leader of the Shia Hazara ethnic group of Afghanistan, who became president of the Shura-yi Enqelabi-yi Ettefaq-i Islami-yi Afghanistan (Revolutionary Council of the Islamic Union of Afghanistan). Born in Bamyan province, Beheshti was educated in Iraq where he became a modarres (religious teacher). In the 1960s he returned to Afghanistan and founded a madrasah in Waras, which became his stronghold. He also was a speaker at the Afghan parliament, until the communists took power in 1978.

In April 1979, uprisings against the Democratic Republic of Afghanistan swept through Hazarajat (also known as the 1979 hazara uprising), and by autumn much of the region was free from government presence. In September 1979, a gathering of several hundred notables from throughout Hazarajat was held at Waras. These included traditional leaders (mir), mullahs, Sayyid and intellectuals. On this occasion, the Revolutionary Council was created, and Beheshti was elected as its president, while Sayyid Muhammad Hasan "Jagran" (major), a former army officer, was appointed as its military commander. The Soviet and government forces controlled Bamiyan, but otherwise undertook few offensives in the region, leaving the Council in control. The Shura took over the former government bureaucracy in Hazarajat, but its rule was plagued by corruption and inefficiency. In 1982, the Sazman-e Nasr, a Hazara militant group, attacked the Shura with the help of some its own commanders, but failed to capture Waras after being driven back by Sayyid Hasan "Jagran"'s forces. Nevertheless, the Shura lost most of its territory to Nasr. In 1984, Nasr and a similar party, the Sepah-i Pasdaran, launched a new offensive and on May 6, they succeeded in capturing Beheshti's village, forcing him to retreat to Naur, "Jagran"'s stronghold. In September, with the help of another Shia moderate party, the Harakat-i Islami, he was able to recapture Waras, after which the military situation in Hazarajat became more stable. In 1987, the principal Shiite parties united under heavy Iranian pressure, forming what became in 1989 the Hezbi Wahdat, led by Abdul Ali Mazari.

In the 1990s, Beheshti joined Burhanuddin Rabbani but was driven out of Kabul when the Taliban captured it in 1996.
