= Siege of Hazarajat =

1996–67 siege of the Afghan Civil War

- Part of the Afghan Civil War (1996–2001)
| Date | November 1996 – July 1997 |
| Location | Hazarajat |
| Result | Hezbe Wahdat victory: Siege lifted |

Belligerents
| (Afghanistan) Taliban | Hezbe Wahdat |

Commanders and leaders
| (Afghanistan) Jalaluddin Haqqani | Karim Khalili; Mohammad Mohaqiq; Shafi Hazara |

Strength
| Unknown | Unknown |

Casualties and losses
| 3,000 killed or wounded 3,600 POWs | Unknown |
- Civilian casualties: 7,000 wounded (both sides)

The siege of Hazarajat began in November 1996 and ended in May–July 1996 by the moto of ethnic cleansing of the Hazaras it ended by anti-Taliban uprisings the uprisings were inspired by the revolt in Mazar-i-Sharif In ten weeks of fighting between May and July, the Taliban suffered over 3,000 killed or wounded, and some 3,600 became POWs The morale of the Taliban plummeted after early defeats in the Battles of Mazar-i-Sharif (1997–1998), as they sought to replenish their losses by recruiting from the madrasas in Pakistan and Afghanistan.

== Background ==
The Taliban laid a siege on Hazarajat hoping to capture the region and establish their rule there. Thousands of Hazaras were starving in Hazarajat in 1997, but fighting was still going on, and after the victory of the Hazaras in Mazar-i-Sharif, the Hazara soldiers of Hezbe Wahdat were motivated to lift off the siege of their homeland. Under the command of Karim Khalili, the Hazaras successfully pushed back the Taliban and lifted off the siege of Hazarajat.

== Aftermath ==
After being defeated in 1997, the Taliban laid another siege on Hazarajat, during this siege thousands of Hazaras starved. The Taliban allowed some food aid to enter Hazarajat on 8 May 1998 in exchange of food supply going to Ghorband District which was the front line of the Taliban during the fighting.
