= Muhammad Akbari =

Afghan politician (born 1945)

Muhammad Akbari محمد اکبری
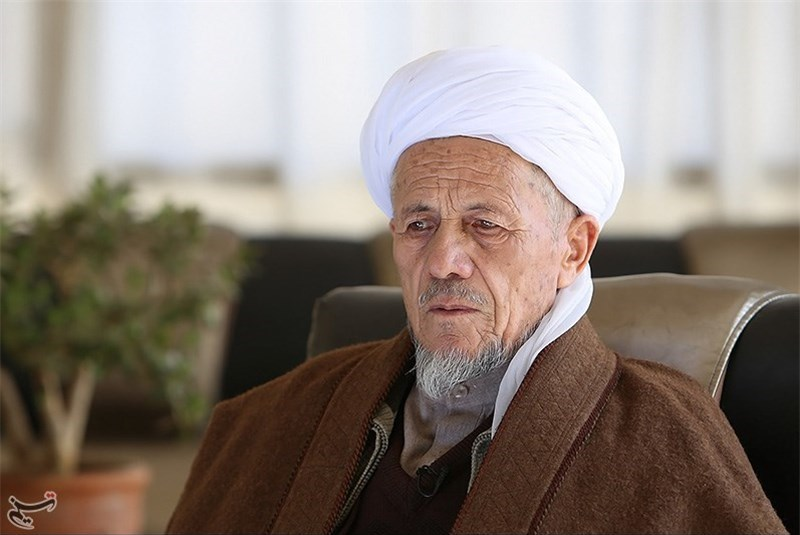

Vice Chairman of Hezbe Wahdat

Personal details
- Born: 14 March 1945 (age 81) Waras, Bamyan Province, Afghanistan
- Party: Islamic Security Party of Afghanistan
- Other political affiliations: Hezbe Wahdat (until early 2000s)
- Occupation: Political leader

Military service
- Allegiance: Kingdom of Afghanistan
- Branch/service: Royal Afghan Army
- Years of service: 1966–1968

Ustad Muhammad Akbari (Dari: استاد محمد اکبری) known as Ustad Akbari, is a former Afghan jihadist commander in Afghanistan, who has held various political affiliations during periods of conflict in Afghanistan. He was the representative of Bamyan during the fifteenth and sixteenth sessions of Afghanistan's parliament, and a member of the House of Elders from 2017 onward.

== Early life ==
Muhammad Akbari was born in 1945 in Afghanistan in Waras District of Bamyan Province. Akbari studied primary education in Islamic schools in Bamyan, Afghanistan from 1961 to 1971, later studying more in Iraq. In 1976 he earned the equivalent of a bachelor's degree in religious studies from a university in Iraq, later acquiring a Ph.D-level education.

== Relations with the Taliban ==
Prior to the Taliban's takeover of Kabul, Ustad Akbari was a senior member in Islamic Unity Party of Afghanistan, the primary Hazara party of Afghanistan. Due to conflicts with the leader of the party's central leadership under Abdul Ali Mazari, who he accused of a coup within the party, he struck an agreement with the Taliban and created a separate branch of the party known as the National Islamic Unity Party of Afghanistan, which gained the allegiance of most party members around Bamyan province. During this period of the first Taliban government, he was considered the senior-most Shia Hazara to support the Taliban.

Following the American Invasion of Afghanistan, Ustad Akbari continued to represent his home region of Bamyan, no longer being affiliated with the Taliban. He was elected to lead Bamyan in the fifteenth and sixteenth sessions of the Afghan parliament, before becoming a member of the House of Elders in 2017.

After the Taliban offensive of 2021 brought the Islamic Emirate back to power, he issued various statements in support of working with them. He participated in Jafar Mahdavi's Shia Commission in meeting with the Taliban, and encouraged the appointment of Shias to positions of political power in the new government. He later met with Minister of Information and Culture Khairullah Khairkhwa and Spokesperson of the Ministry of Foreign Affairs Abdul Qahar Balkhi to discuss the situation of Afghan Shias.

== See also ==
- Hezbe Wahdat
- National Islamic Unity Party of Afghanistan
