= Hazara nationalism =

Nationalist movement in Afghanistan

Flag of Hazaristan

Hazara nationalism is an ideology that asserts the Hazara people, an ethnic group native to the Hazaristan region in Afghanistan, are a distinct nation and deserve a nation-state of their own. The movement draws influence from the distinct culture, language and the historical atrocities which Hazaras have faced, notably the Hazara genocide, and the systematic discrimination which many Hazaras have continued to face within Afghanistan.

== Background ==
Hazara nationalism stems from lingual and ancestral roots in the Hazaristan region in the modern-day central Afghanistan. Hazara nationalism in its modern form began in the form of the 1888–1893 Hazara uprisings and 1890s (Organisation for Unity of the Hazara) based in Hazaristan, led by Hazara elders and allies. The aim of the group was to establish political and constitutional reform in the Hazaristan region; and an end to the military despotism of Abdur Rahman of the Barakzai dynasty for the eventual unification of all Hazara lands into an independent state.

== Modern Hazara nationalism ==
In 1985, simultaneously with the formation of the Hezbe Wahdat, Hazara intellectuals in Mazare Sharif, formed a nationalist organisation, called the Hazara Unity.

There was a revival of Hazara nationalism after the Balkhab uprising, led by Mehdi Mujahid in 2022. In his own words, Mehdi left the Taliban and began rebelling as a result of persecution of Shia Muslims and Hazaras.

The ideology has considerable support from the Hazara diaspora in Australia, United Kingdom, Sweden, Norway, United States, Canada and other countries. Successive Pashtun-dominated Afghan governments have repeatedly made claims that the Hazara nationalists have received funding from Iran, despite the fact that the Hazara nationalists are against the Iranian regime, and have criticized the theocratic regime on many occasions for discrimination against the Hazara people in Iran. According to them, these accusations are the usual propaganda tactic that the Pashtun-dominated governments use against the Hazara people.

== Notable Hazara nationalists ==
- Mir Yazdanbakhsh
- Ibrahim Gawsawar
- General Musa Khan
- Sultan Ali Keshtmand
- Abdul Ali Mazari
- Commander Shafi Hazara
- Sarwar Sarkhosh
- Dawood Sarkhosh
- Aziz Royesh
- Daoud Naji
- Abbas Noyan
- Ahmad Behzad
- Mehdi Mujahid

== See also ==
- List of Hazara tribes
