= Mosharekat-e Melli Weekly =

- Editor: Hafezullah Zaki
- Frequency: Weekly
- Publisher: Hezbe Wahdat Publishing Unit
- Founder: Hezbe Wahdat
- Country: Afghanistan
- Based in: Kabul
- Language: Dari and Pashto
- Website: www.mosharekat.wahdat.net

Mosharekat-e Melli (Dari: مشارکت ملی) is an Afghan weekly magazine based in Kabul published by Hizbe Wahdat Islami (Islamic Unity Party), a primarily Hazara political party. Between April 2012 and May 2013 Mohammad Reza Naseri served as the chief editor of the magazine.
