= Hezbollah Afghanistan =

Hezbollah Afghanistan حزب الله أفغانستان
- Secretary-General: Ahmad Ali Ghordarwazi
- Founder: Ahmad Ali Ghordarwazi
- Founded: 1980 (as rebel group); 2005 (registered as legal party in Afghanistan)
- Associated group: Liwa Fatemiyoun
- Ideology: Afghan Shiite minority rights Shia Islamism; Khomeinism
- National affiliation: Tehran Eight (1987–1989)

Party flag
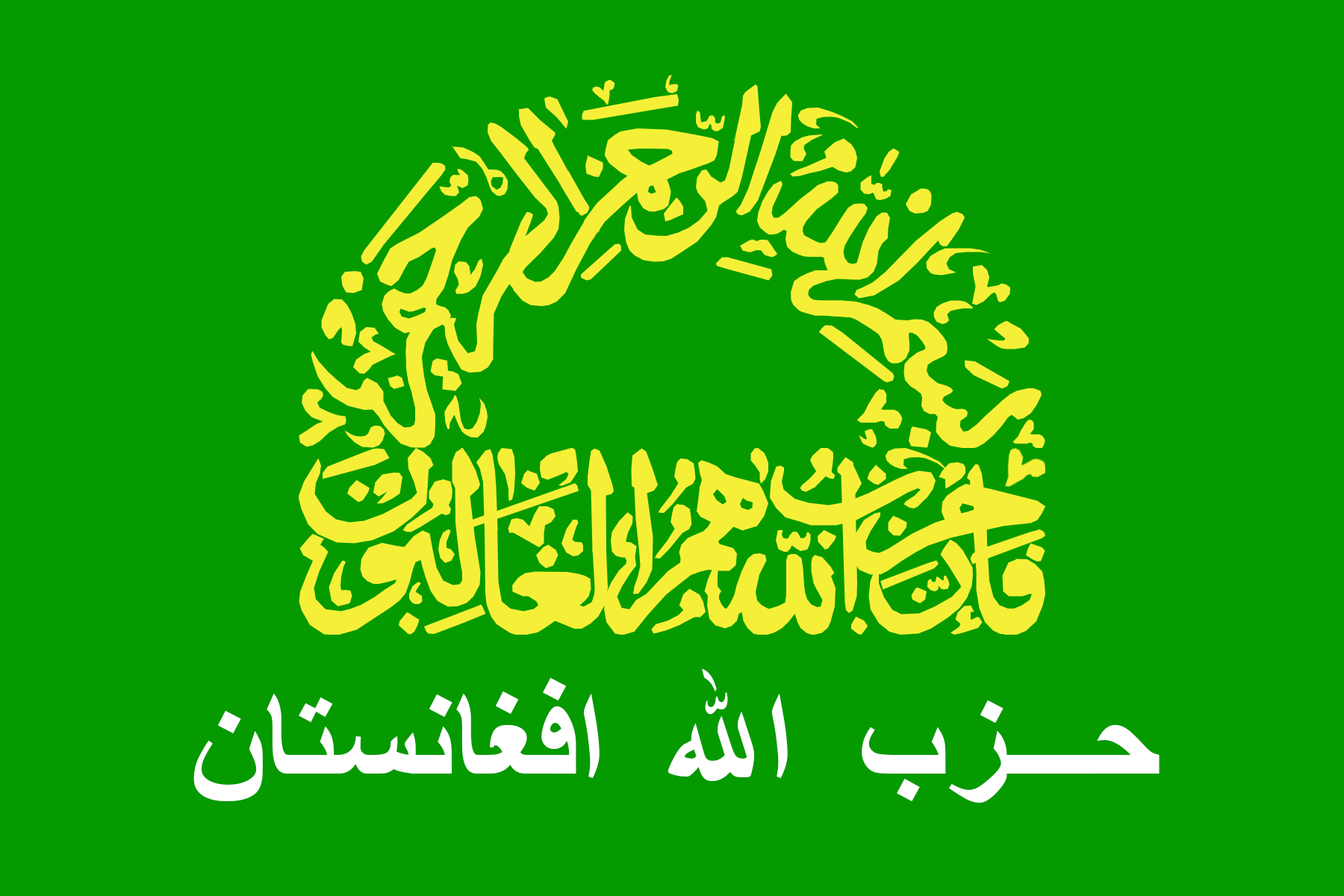

Hezbollah Afghanistan is a Shia Islamist political party in Afghanistan. It was originally founded in 1980 as a rebel group and part of the Tehran Eight, and fought with Iranian support during the Soviet–Afghan War. In 2005, it became a legal party, and in the 2010s it developed close connections with Liwa Fatemiyoun, an Afghan paramilitary force organized by Iran.

== History ==
In course of the Iranian Revolution of 1978/79, various radical grassroots groups emerged at Iranian universities. One of these, the "Hezb'ollahi", was characterized by the Time as a far-right religious fundamentalist movement that gave Ruhollah Khomeini "unquestioning obedience". Following the Iranian Revolution, Iran began to establish several groups associated with the name "Hezbollah" in Afghanistan. The country funded and armed various insurgent groups, both Shiite as well as Sunni ones, as they fought in the Soviet–Afghan War.

The first Afghan group officially known as "Party of Allah" ("Hezbollah" or "Hezbe Allah") was founded in 1980, years before the better known Lebanese Hezbollah. This Afghan Hezbollah was led by Qari Ahmad Ali, a cleric who hoped to become the "spiritual leader of the Shiites of Afghanistan". The party was headquartered in Mashhad, with party branches based in the Iranian cities of Tehran, Nishapur, Zabol, Zahedan, and Geyebad. Its armed wing reportedly fielded 4,000 militants who fought against the Democratic Republic of Afghanistan (DRA) in the provinces of Herat, Farah, Nimruz, Ghor, Bamyan, Uruzgan, and Kandahar. The Afghan Hezbollah was reportedly known for its "brutality toward supporters" of the DRA.

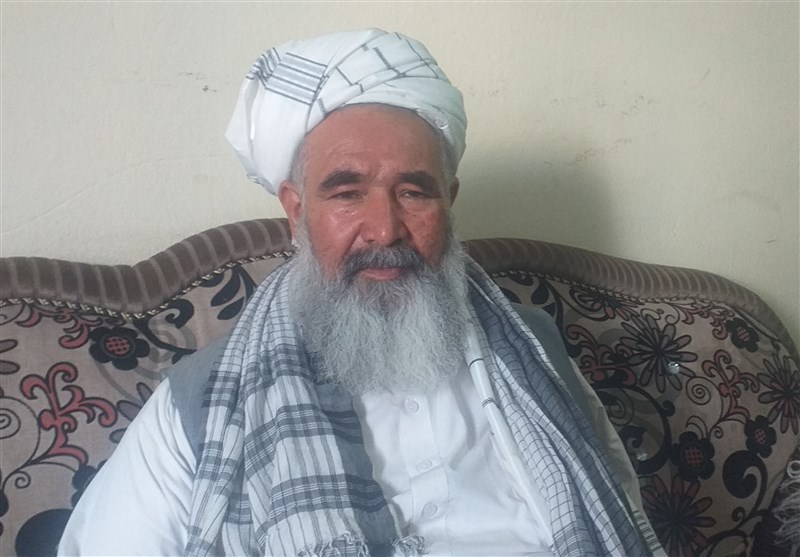
Qari Ahmad Ali, Secretary-General and founder of Hezbollah Afghanistan, in 2021

The group was first registered as a legal party under the name "Hezbollah Afghanistan" in the Islamic Republic of Afghanistan in 2005, and remained a largely marginal force in Afghan politics. According to researcher Phillip Smyth, Hezbollah Afghanistan "incorporated" with Liwa Fatemiyoun, an Afghan Shia paramilitary group fielded by Iran, at some point before 2014. Smyth noted that the two groups had considerable overlap in ideology and members. In the next years, some sources such researcher Oved Lobel continued to regard Liwa Fatemiyoun and Hezbollah Afghanistan as separate, albeit closely connected organizations, whereas others such as Arab News and Jihad Intel began to treat Hezbollah Afghanistan as synonymous with Liwa Fatemiyoun. Researcher Michael Robillard called Liwa Fatemiyoun a "branch of Hezbollah Afghanistan". As Liwa Fatemiyoun fought in the Syrian civil war, Hezbollah Afghanistan reportedly forged "obscure links" with Lebanese Hezbollah.

After the 2021 Taliban offensive overthrew the Islamic Republic of Afghanistan, replacing it with an Islamic Emirate, Hezbollah Afghanistan leader Ahmad Ali declared that his party did not oppose the Taliban. According to him, the new government had assured him that Afghan Shiites would not be discriminated against. He also voiced his opinion that the Islamic Republic of Afghanistan had failed in keeping Afghanistan stable and safe, and that the Islamic Emirate of Afghanistan would improve the security situation.

== Organization and ideology ==
Since 1980, Hezbollah Afghanistan has been led by Qari Ahmad Ali Ghordarwazi (alternatively transliterated "Kari Ahmad Yakdaste" alias "one-armed Kari"). Hezbollah Afghanistan has traditionally been rooted in Shia Islamism and was supposed to spread the ideas of the Iranian Revolution. In 2021, Qari Ahmad Ali declared that his party was opposed to religious discrimination in Afghanistan.
