= Revolutionary Council of Islamic Unity of Afghanistan =

Revolutionary Council of Islamic Unity of Afghanistan شوراى انقلاب اتفاق اسلامی افغانستان Šūrā-e-Inqilābī-e-Ittifāq-e-Islāmī Afğānistān
- Leader: Sayyid Ali Beheshti
- Founded: September 1979
- Dissolved: 1989
- Merged into: Hezbe Wahdat
- Ideology: Shia Islamism; Conservatism; Hazara interests
- Religion: Shia Islam
- National affiliation: Tehran Eight (1987-1989)
- International affiliation: Islamic Republican Party

Revolutionary Council of Islamic Unity of Afghanistan
- Leader: Sayyid Ali Beheshti
- Dates active: September 1979-1989
- Ideology: Shia Islamism; Hazara nationalism
- Part of: Tehran Eight
- Wars: the Soviet–Afghan War

The Revolutionary Council of Islamic Unity of Afghanistan (Dari: شوراى انقلاب اتفاق اسلامی افغانستان, Shura-i Engelab-i Ettefaq-i Islami Afghanistan, often called simply Shura) was a Hazara political movement which appeared in Afghanistan in 1979 in opposition to the increasingly leftist Kabul government. The movement was led by Sayyid Ali Beheshti.

The Shura had both political and militant arms, and removed many Kabul-backed authorities within the Hazarajat (Hazara-populated region of Afghanistan), replacing them with their own functionaries.The Shura was considered as a government for the whole Hazarajat and used to be a powerful party among the Hazaras. By the end of 1983 the Shura controlled 60% of the population of the Hazarajat.

The Shura was the primary Hazara resistance movement part of the Tehran Eight political constellation, followed by the Al-Nasr (Victory) and the Union of Islamic Fighters.
