= Abdul Ali Mazari =

Afghan politician and political figure (1946–1995)

Martyr of the National Unity of Afghanistan Ustad Abdul Ali Mazari
- عبدالعلی مزاری (Dari)
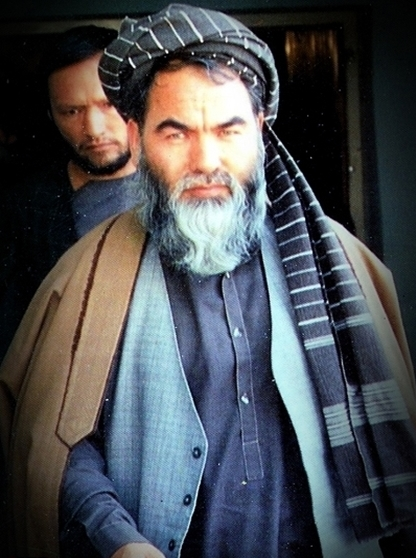

Leader of the Islamic Unity Party of Afghanistan
- In office 1989 – 13 March 1995

Personal details
- Born: 27 May 1946 Charkent, Kingdom of Afghanistan
- Died: 13 March 1995 (aged 48) Ghazni, Afghanistan
- Party: Afghan Mujahideen; Islamic Unity Party of Afghanistan
- Parent: Haji Khudaidad (father)
- Occupation: Politician and guerrilla leader
- Awards: Mim Hea Mim peace award
- Nickname: Baba Mazari (بابه مزاری)

Military service
- Allegiance: Sazman-i Nasr; Hezb-e Wahdat
- Years of service: 1979–1995
- Battles/wars: 1979 uprisings in Afghanistan; Soviet-Afghan War; First Afghan Civil War; Second Afghan Civil War X

Abdul Ali Mazari (Dari: عبدالعلی مزاری; (Note: Dari pronunciation: [ʔäb.d̪ʊl ʔä.líː mä.zɑː.ɾíː]) 27 May 1946 – 13 March 1995) was an Afghan Hazara politician and leader of Hezbe Wahdat during and following the Soviet–Afghan War, who advocated for a federal system of governance in Afghanistan. Mazari envisioned that this would end the political and ethnic division in Afghanistan by guaranteeing rights to every ethnic group. He was captured and assassinated by the Taliban during negotiations in 1995 amid the Second Afghan Civil War.

In 2016, he was posthumously given the title "Martyr for National Unity of Afghanistan" and had a statue erected in his honor by the Islamic Republic of Afghanistan. Shortly after reclaiming power, the Taliban demolished the statue.

He was commonly known as Baba Mazari for his leadership of Hezbe Wahdat within the Hazara community.

== Early life ==
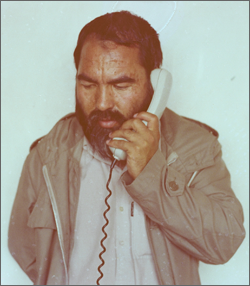
Mazari talking on a telephone, before his political life

Abdul Ali Mazari, son of Haji Khudaidad, was born in 1946 in the Charkent district of Balkh province, south of the northern city of Mazar-e-Sharif. He began his primary schooling in theology at the local school in his hometown, then went to Mazar-e-Sharif and later to Qom, Iran and Najaf, Iraq.

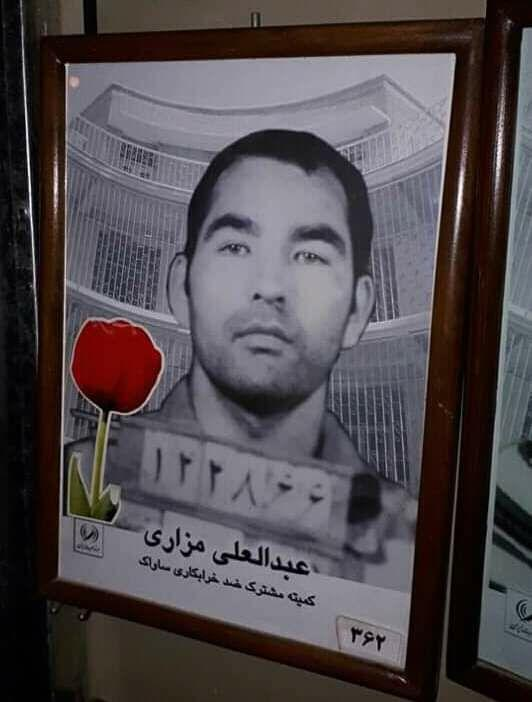
Abdul Ali Mazari's mugshot of being arrested by the Iranian Imperial Police

Growing up and living in Pahlavi Iran, Mazari took part in the Iranian Revolution, where he had protested against the Iranian government, alongside the future Iranian leader, Ali Khamenei. He was then tortured and imprisoned for months by the Iranian intelligence agency, SAVAK, after being accused of initiating a conspiracy against Iranian ruler, Mohammad Reza Shah.

== Mujahideen commander and politician ==
After the Saur Revolution on 27 April 1978, Mazari fled to Najaf, later to Syria, and then to Pakistan temporarily. During the Soviet–Afghan War, Mazari returned to Afghanistan and gained a prominent place in the mujahideen resistance movement. During the first years of the resistance, he lost his young brother, Muhammed Sultan, during a battle against the Afghan Army. He soon lost his sister and other members of his family in the resistance. His uncle, Muhammad Jafar, and his son, Muhammad Afzal, were imprisoned and executed by the Soviet-backed Democratic Republic of Afghanistan. His father, Haji Khudaidad, and his brother, Haji Muhammad Nabi, were killed as well in the war.

Abdul Ali Mazari was one of the founding members and the first leader of the Hezb-e Wahdat. In the first party congress in Bamyan, he was elected leader of the Central Committee and in the second congress, he was elected Secretary General. Mazari's initiative led to the creation of the "Jonbesh-e Shomal" (Northern Movement), in which the country's most significant military forces joined ranks with the rebels, leading to a coup d'état and the eventual downfall of the Communist regime in Kabul.

After the 1992 fall of Kabul, the Afghan political parties agreed on a peace and power-sharing agreement, the Peshawar Accords, which created the Islamic State of Afghanistan and appointed an interim government for a transitional period to be followed by general elections. According to Human Rights Watch:

The sovereignty of Afghanistan was vested formally in the Islamic State of Afghanistan, an entity created in April 1992, after the fall of the Soviet-backed Najibullah government. ... With the exception of Pashtun warlord Gulbuddin Hekmatyar's Hezb-e Islami, all of the parties... were ostensibly unified under this government in April 1992. ... Hekmatyar's Hezbe Islami, for its part, refused to recognize the government for most of the period discussed in this report and launched attacks against government forces but the shells and rockets fell everywhere in Kabul resulting in many civilian casualties.

Although Hezb-e Wahdat initially participated in the Islamic State and held some posts in the government, conflict soon broke out between the Hazara Hezb-e Wahdat of Mazari and the Pashtun Ittihad-e Islami of Abdur Rasul Sayyaf. The Islamic State's defense minister Ahmad Shah Massoud tried to mediate between the factions with some success, but the cease-fire remained only temporary. In June 1992, the Hezb-e Wahdat and the Ittihad-i Islami engaged in violent street battles against each other. With the support of Saudi Arabia, Sayyaf's forces repeatedly attacked the western suburbs of Kabul resulting in heavy civilian casualties. Likewise, Mazari's Iran-supported forces that were also accused of attacking civilian targets in the west. Mazari acknowledged taking Pashtun civilians as prisoners, but defended the action by saying that Sayyaf's forces took Hazaras first, adding that the prisoners taken by his forces were housed, fed, given water, and not tortured. While there is disagreement as to who started the conflict, it is well-documented that there were heavy civilian casualties and human rights abuses on all sides. In January 1993, faced with an offensive by Jamiat forces against both parties, Mazari's group and Hekmatyar's group began cooperating with one another.

In September 1994, following accusations against Abdul Ali Mazari of committing a coup within the party's leadership, senior Hezb-e Wahdat member Muhammad Akbari separated from Mazari to form the National Islamic Unity Party of Afghanistan, which aligned itself with the Taliban and gained the support of the majority of party members in the Hazara hinterland and some surrounding regions, particularly in Panjab district, Waras district, Uruzgan province, Helmand province, and Sar-e pol province. Although Mazari's influence was heavily reduced by the split, he was able to retain the allegiance of the majority of Hezb-e Wahdat members in western Kabul, Yakawlang district, Wardak province, and Mazar-i-Sharif city.

== Death ==
According to Hazara Press, on 12 March 1995, the Taliban requested a meeting with Mazari and a delegation from the Islamic Wahdat Central Party Abuzar Ghaznawi, Ekhlaasi, Eid Mohammad Ibrahimi Behsudi, Ghassemi, Jan Mohammad, Sayed Ali Alavi, Bahodari, and Jan Ali in Chahar Asiab, near the city of Kabul. On their arrival, the group was abducted and tortured. A Western journalist reported seeing Mazari in the Taliban captivity with his hands and feet bound. The following day Mazari was killed and his body was found in Ghazni. The Taliban issued a statement that Mazari had attacked the Taliban guards while being flown to Kandahar. Later, his body and those of his companions were handed over to Hezb-e Wahdat, mutilated and showing signs of torture.

According to the Taliban's Al Somood magazine, claims of him being killed deliberately are false, and he died in an accident involving a helicopter crash near Ghazni. Taliban-affiliated researcher Mustafa Hamid described the Taliban's version of events surrounding the death of Abdul Ali Mazari in detail, stating that it began with Mazari and a group accompanying him being detained by the Taliban during a routine inspection of taxis passing through a village on the outskirts of Kabul. At the request of Taliban officials, he was thereafter placed on a helicopter leaving Kabul. Having become suspicious of the Taliban's intentions, Mazari and his partners snatched the weapon of one of the Taliban guards whilst mid-flight, killing another one of the guards and injuring the pilot. This caused the helicopter to violently crash over the province of Ghazni, killing everyone on board. The crash of the aircraft attracted the attention of a nearby Taliban patrol, who found Mazari's deceased body onboard. However, locals denied seeing any evidence of a helicopter crash, and the Taliban did not publicly disclose the exact location of the crash.

Mazari's body, after being handed over by the Taliban, was carried by his followers on foot from Ghazni across Hazarajat to Mazar-e-Sharif (at the time under the control of his ally Abdur Rashid Dostum) in heavy snow over forty days. Hundreds of thousands attended his funeral in Mazar-e-Sharif. Mazari was officially named "Martyr for National Unity of Afghanistan" in 2016 by the Islamic Republic of Afghanistan and a statue of him was erected in Bamiyan, a Hazara cultural hub. Shortly after retaking power, the Taliban demolished the statue and renamed Bamiyan square, which had been named in his honor. This prompted outcry from the Hazara population, who see Mazari as a beloved figure.

== See also ==
- Commander Shafi Hazara
- Mehdi Mujahid
- Afghanistan conflict (1978–present)
- List of Hazara people
