= Waras District =

Waras ورس
- District
- Location within Afghanistan
- Coordinates: 34°13′12″N 66°54′07″E
- Country: Afghanistan
- Province: Bamyan
- Capital: Waras
- Elevation: 3,001 m (9,846 ft)

Population (2011)
  - Total: 76,398

Waras (Dari/Hazaragi: ورس) is a mountainous district in the southern part of Bamyan province, Afghanistan. Its population is 76,398 people (2011), whose population is entirely Hazara And Sadat / Sayed The main village is Waras (other forms of the name: Sewake Dahanwaras, Dahanwars, Sēwake Dahanwaras, Dahan Varas, Dahan Waras, Dahanwars). It is situated at 3,001 metres (9,845.8 ft).

== Climate ==
Waras has a subarctic climate (Köppen: Dsc) with mild, dry summers and cold, snowy winters.

Climate data for Sēwak-e Dahan Waras
Month	Jan	Feb	Mar	Apr	May	Jun	Jul	Aug	Sep	Oct	Nov	Dec	Year
Daily mean °C (°F)	−11.5 (11.3)	−11.8 (10.8)	−4.5 (23.9)	3.2 (37.8)	7.8 (46.0)	12.4 (54.3)	14.1 (57.4)	13.4 (56.1)	8.5 (47.3)	2.8 (37.0)	−3.3 (26.1)	−7.6 (18.3)	2.0 (35.5)
Average precipitation mm (inches)	40.4 (1.59)	82.4 (3.24)	77.1 (3.04)	74.8 (2.94)	39.2 (1.54)	22.1 (0.87)	10.9 (0.43)	23.1 (0.91)	18.6 (0.73)	30.7 (1.21)	25.1 (0.99)	29.8 (1.17)	474.2 (18.66)
Source: ClimateCharts (1989-2019)
