= Hezbe Wahdat =

Primarily Hazara political party in Afghanistan

Islamic Unity Party of Afghanistan حزب وحدت اسلامی افغانستان Hizb-i Wahdat-i Islamī-yi Afghānistān
- Founder: Abdul Ali Mazari
- Founded: 1989
- Preceded by: Tehran Eight
- Headquarters: Kabul, Afghanistan (formerly)
- Ideology: Hazara nationalism; Factions: Shia Islamism
- Colors: Black, red and green

Party flag

Islamic Unity Party of Afghanistan
- حزب وحدت اسلامی افغانستان
- Leader: Abdul Ali Mazari
- Military leader: Commander Shafi; Abuzar Ghaznawi
- Dissolved: 2001
- Country: Afghanistan
- Groups: Primarily Hazaras; Qizilbash and Sayyid
- Headquarters: Bamyan (1989–1991); West of Kabul (1991–1995)
- Newspaper: Wahdat
- Ideology: Shia Islamism
- Status: Dissolved
- Wars: Afghan Civil War (1989–1992); Second Afghan Civil War; Third Afghan Civil War

The Islamic Unity Party of Afghanistan, (Note: Dari: حزب وحدت اسلامی افغانستان) shortened to Hizb-i Wahdat, "the Unity Party", is an Afghan political party founded in 1989. Like most contemporary major political parties in Afghanistan, Hezb-e Wahdat is rooted in the turbulent period of the anti-Soviet resistance movements in Afghanistan in the 1980s. It was formed to bring together nine separate and mostly inimical military and ideological groups into a single entity.

During the Second Afghan Civil War, it emerged as one of the major actors in Kabul and some other parts of the country with support from Iran. Political Shia Islamism was the ideology of most of its key leaders, but the party gradually tilted towards its Hazara ethnic support base and became the key vehicle of the community's political demands and aspirations. Its ideological background and ethnic support base has continuously shaped its character and political agenda. Through the anti-Soviet jihad and the civil war, Hezb-e Wahdat accumulated significant political capital among Afghanistan's Hazaras.

By 2009, however, Hezb-e Wahdat was so fragmented and divided that the political weight it carried in the country bore little resemblance to what it had once been. It had fragmented into at least four competing organizations, each claiming ownership of the name and legacy of Hezb-e Wahdat.

== Background ==
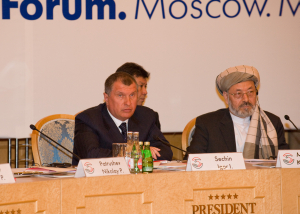
Abdul Karim Khalili with Deputy Prime Minister of Russia Igor Sechin, May 14, 2009, Moscow.

Following the collapse of the pro-Soviet Kabul government in the Hazarajat in 1979, the region fell under the control of Shura-ye Inqilab (Revolutionary Council of Islamic Unity of Afghanistan), a hastily assembled region-wide organization Soon it was challenged and overthrown by several new radical Islamist groups that engaged in endless power and ideological struggles, however, these were nonviolent and the various groups were still targeting the USSR forces in unity. The wars and conflicts were launched and fought against the USSR forces with strong ideological fervor. However, none of the organizations were able to determine the outcome of the political control of Hazarajat in their favor. Towards the second half of the 1980s a complete stalemate was emerging in the region, with each organization confined to specific pockets of territory. As a result, there was an overwhelming desire for change felt both by the villagers and senior leaders of the organizations to unite.

Several attempts to make peace and ensure stability failed. Alliances and coalitions were crafted and dismantled. The most important and effective of them were the Shura-ye Etelaf (Tehran Eight), an alliance of eight major armed Shia Afghan (mostly Shia Afghan Hazara) organizations formed in Tehran, Iran in 1985. It was the most effective attempt to achieve unity of action by the leaderships of the organizations and was to become an important precedent for the formation of Hizb-e Wahdat. However, while the alliance provided the Hazara Mujahedin with a common political voice in negotiations and bargaining with the Sunni organizations based in Peshawar, Pakistan, it failed to tackle the incessant ideological friction within the party. To stabilize the region a more radical move was required.

With the announcement of the Soviet withdrawal in January 1988, the collapse of the Kabul government was believed to be imminent and a dramatic reconfiguration of political alignments was in the making. This was happening at a time when the Kabul government and the ruling Hezb-e Demokratik-e Khalq (People's Democratic Party, PDPA) were experiencing intensive factional and ethnic rivalries. Declining faith in the future of the government facilitated the emergence of new political alignments largely between members of the same ethnic groups, cutting across the ideological divide between the mujahedin and the PDPA officials. In the meantime, negotiations on the formation of an interim government led by the Sunni organizations based in Peshawar excluded the Hazara alliance based in Tehran. The combined effect of these developments among the Hazara organizations was greater awareness of the need for more collective and assertive bargaining with their Sunni counterparts if they were to be taken seriously. It was against this background that a more radical demand for unification and merger of all existing political-military organizations into a single party dominated the politics of the region. Several meetings were held throughout the region in which the nature and composition of the new party and the role of existing organizations in it were debated extensively. In August 1988, the provincial center of Bamyan fell into the hand of Hazara mujahideen. This further facilitated and encouraged the formation of a regional organization. The operation that resulted in the collapse of the government in the town was coordinated jointly by different mujahidin forces in the region. Sazman-e Nasr (Victory Organization) played a central and coordinating role in the attack. This development marked complete the elimination of any presence of the Kabul government within the entire Hazarajat region.

Henceforth Bamyan was the center of important political developments. It injected a new stimulus into the ongoing unification process among the mujahedin organizations in the region. The town hosted the final meeting that resulted in the declaration of the Misaq-e Wahdat or the unity treaty in July 1989 less than a year after its liberation. It became a center of political leadership and power for the new party beyond and away from the local factional and personal rivalries of local commanders. What contrasted the negotiation process for the formation of Wahdat with similar previous efforts was that it was essentially a process initiated from within the Hazarajat region. The process was informed and shaped by the realities of war, factionalism, and loss of control of the political leadership over military commanders within the region. Conversely, the previous coalition-building efforts were centered in Iran and were often under the direct influence of the Iranian authorities. Once it was formed, its leaders faced the challenge of convincing their representatives at the Shuray-e Eatelaf and officials of the Iranian government, who were more at ease with dealing with a coalition of separate parties in Tehran. The fragmentation of the Hazara mujahedin had given the Iranians effective leverage to control small organizations, often tied to various religious authorities and government agencies in Iran. The Iranians feared that a single party based inside Afghanistan could mean they would lose control over the movement. Furthermore, the increasingly evident ethnic discourse within the party was seen unfavorably by the Iranian authorities who had for years tried to promote a more pan-Shiite political Islamism during the period of jihad. Husain Ibrahimi, the representative of the Iranian supreme leader Ali Khamenei in Afghan affairs at that time, is alleged to have tried to prevent the formation of Hizb-e Wahdat in order to maintain his influence. Eventually, once the party was formed, the Iranians decided to work with it and supported it in the early days of its existence. But, as the subsequent course of political developments (discussed below) shows, the party was to pursue a rather independent political strategy, often in conflict with Iranian policies and interests in the country.

== Hezbe Wahdat ==
Roundel of Hezbe Wahdat's air force during the Civil War.

As the name Wahdat (Unity) indicates, the main objective of the party was to unify all Shiite mujahedin organizations under a single political leadership. It was created in response to a strong urge for unity among the Hazara leaders as well as commoners.

In its organizational hierarchy, the party included the following key structures:

- Shuray-e Aali Nezarat, (the Supreme Supervisory Council), was meant to include high-ranking religious figures and experts. In its supervisory role, the council was tasked to monitor all levels of the party and serve as the highest leadership and control mechanism over all activities and policies of the party.
- The next and most important body within the party was its Central Council. This organ was the most powerful deliberative and decision-making authority within the party. Because of the importance attached to it, its membership expanded in a most dramatic manner. Originally, it was planned to include 36 members, but the growing need for expansion and inclusion of other figures and groups into the party resulted in a constant increase in size. The first congress of the party in September 1991 urged the party leadership to facilitate integration of other Shiite groups and figures into the party. As such it was also resolved that the central and supervisory councils could be expanded as needed. At its peak, the Central Council included more than 80 members representing nearly all religious and political groups and influential figures in the region, as well as Hazara figures from the cities. It was through membership and division of power within this council that the party managed to hold the previously fragmented and hostile Hazara political groupings together.
- The Wahdat Manifesto also provided for the formation of provincial- and district-level councils that would report to their relevant committees at the headquarters in Bamyan.

The search for change and unity was instigated and led in particular by the senior leaders of the two main organizations, Pasdaran and Nasr, which were the most exposed to the threat of deligitimisation as a result of their loss of control over their military commanders. The path to unity had been a painstakingly long and complex process, which experienced repeated setbacks and obstacles, because each party sought to maximize their role in the process. This turned out to be a major contentious issue throughout several rounds of negotiations in the run up to formation of the party. Smaller parties pressed for equal representation of all groups while the more powerful ones demanded greater power and a share of the positions in the unified party. Eventually the latter argument prevailed; Nasr and Pasdaran persuaded other organizations to concede to proportional representation.

Smaller parties were pressured and even intimidated into joining the process. Many groups had no other choice than joining it: the cost of standing outside would have been unbearable. The following two examples provide insight into the complexity of the process. Harakat Islami, led by Shaikh Asif Mohsini, was the main Shiite party that refused to join Wahdat. The party was dominated by non-Hazara Shiites. Initially, the party was represented in a series of negotiations, but Mohsini later declined to sign, having presented a number of conditions to be met. His conditions were interpreted as an unwillingness to join a party in which historical Hazara grievances and political aspirations predominated. Nonetheless, sections of his party joined Hezb-e Wahdat either because the new party was more promising for the political future of the Hazaras or because the pressure to join was so strong that it could not be resisted. The party's core could resist the pressure to join mainly because it was located outside the region. However, it did lose a substantial section of its Hazara following to Hezb-e Wahdat, a fact underlining the growing importance of ethnic identities in the aftermath of jihad in the country.

The military class that had flourished during the civil war posed one of the main obstacles to unification. Nahzat-e Islami is a good example of military commanders refusing to unite in spite of the agreement of their leaders. Its senior leaders participated in the unification process and hosted one of the meetings in their stronghold in the Jaghori district of Ghazni province. However, Wasiq, Nehzat's main military commander in the district, refused to dismantle his military structure and continued to operate under the name of Nahzat. This resulted in a military confrontation with the formerly Nasr commanders who were fighting on behalf of Hezb-e Wahdat. The conflict resulted in the total defeat of Nahzat and other smaller organisations in this district in 1993. As a result, Wahdat in Jaghori and most other parts of Ghazni established itself through the military victory of the former Nasr forces.

One after the other the smaller parties were pressured or coaxed to join the process. In November 1989, the remnant of Behisthi's Shuray-e Ittefaq also joined. His decision to participate in the unification process was a turning point in the development of clerical leadership in the Hazarajat, as it symbolized the recognition of Khomeinist hegemony by important non-Khomeinist elements of the clergy. Behishthi's Shura was different from other organizations. He represented the conservative and non-revolutionary component of the ulema. He was a follower of the Khoei school of thought, a moderate, non-political and conservative line of thinking opposed to Khomeini's revolutionary Islamism and dominant among Afghanistani Shiites until the early 1980s. By the time Hezb-e Wahdat was in the making, Beheshti was reduced to leading a small fraction of the Shura in Nawur district of Ghazni.

The ambition to integrate previously hostile organizations into a single party had achieved a great degree of success. Officially, all the previous organizations except Harakat were dissolved and their military structures were dismantled. A relatively stable political order was restored in the areas under its control. However, the party suffered from serious structural problems and ideological differences.

== Later history ==
In its history, the party suffered three major defeats. The first defeat was marked by its downfall in Kabul and the death of Mazari at the hands of the Taliban in March 1995. Secondly, in August 1998 the northern city of Mazar-e Sharif was overrun by the Taliban; the city was the second important centre of the northern alliance after the fall of Kabul and also held a major concentration of Wahdat's troops and civilian Hazaras. Hezb-e Wahdat had played the key role in repelling a Taliban offensive on the city in 1997 and was to bear the brunt of Taliban anger this time. Thousands of Hazaras were massacred or imprisoned. Thirdly, in a few weeks the Taliban captured Bamyan, the new headquarters of the party, in another dramatic move. This marked the end of Hezb-e Wahdat's political life as a cohesive political organisation. The fall of these two cities proved to be much more than military defeats. Nearly all of the territories under its control were captured by the Taliban. Its political and military cadres fled into neighbouring countries. Khalili went to Iran. From amongst the senior leaders, only Muhaqiq after a brief period in Iran returned quickly to Afghanistan and organised a resistance front in the Balkhab district of Saripul. Wahdat It never managed to recover after the fall of Mazar e sharif and Bamyan into the hands of the Taliban, because of the high losses in its rank and file and at the leadership levels.

Thus Hezb-e Wahdat participated in the post-Taliban political process with little of its past political and military weight. Wahdat still claimed to represent the Hazaras and the Hazarajat region fell under its control as the Taliban regime was overthrown. In the Interim Administration (2001–2002), Wahdat had a modest weight; Muhammad Mohaqiq represented the party as one of the deputy chairmen and Minister of Planning. Members of Harakat and Akbari's Wahdat mostly represented the Shiites in the Interim Administration as well as the Transitional Administration in 2002-2003. Moreover, in the new political circumstances, the party needed to adapt to the new political realities in the country. The new political order established under the auspices of the international community required the military-political organisations to transform into civilian political parties. This entailed disbanding their military wings, disarming under the UN-led Disarmament, Demobilization and Reintegration programme and operating under the new legal and political environment. As mentioned earlier, Hezb-e Wahdat's military structure disintegrated under the Taliban, and as a result in late 2001 the organisation was in no way comparable to other anti-Taliban organisations in terms of military structure and hardware. Its leaders lacked the political and military resources to reorganise their fighters on any significant scale. In June 2005, the only major military structure controlled by the party, the Ninth Corps, was disbanded, ending financial support from the centre to Wahdat's military wing. Lacking resources and with a weak organisation, the party saw its military activities almost come to a halt; only in northern Afghanistan did some elements of it survive. Wahdat's weakness vis-à-vis other, better resourced military-political organisations was compounded. On the positive side, its leaders can claim credit for effectively having given up their military wing.

The second and most pressing demand for reform came from within the Hazara political community. Reforming and reviving the party as the largest and most influential Hazara organisation was a central priority for most of the Hazara intellectual and clerical elites. Many educated Hazaras of various ideological backgrounds rushed to Kabul in 2002 and volunteered to play a role in the party. Ideas for reform and restructuring the party were presented to Karim Khalili and Muhammad Mohaqiq, who were seen as the key leaders. While the need to change and broaden the party leadership has frequently been acknowledged by both Mohaqiq and Khalili, most reformists (including clerics) have been frustrated by lack of practical will and determination of the senior leaders. With the disintegration of its military structures and the necessity to transform into a full political party, Hezb-e Wahdat faced an extremely difficult challenge that required radical changes. The transition from a military to political organisation has been similarly difficult for other Afghan organisations created during the years of war. But Hizb-e Wahdat faced a unique predicament of its own, deriving from the emergence of a much larger educated class among the Hazaras. Wahdat's political cadres were mostly clerics educated in religious schools in Afghanistan or in Iran and Iraq. In their rise to political leadership they fiercely competed with university-educated challengers and remained sceptical and fearful of modern educated politicians. They suddenly found themselves forced to engage with western notions of democracy, human rights, etcetera. As in 1992, opening the doors of the party to more educated Hazara cadres was a precondition for meeting reformist expectations, but the return to the country of many young Hazaras educated in Iran and Pakistan was out of all proportion with the threat that had been represented by the limited number of leftists and government officials welcomed into Wahdat in 1992. After 2001, the party nominally maintained its old structure in which seven of the eleven commissions within the Jaghori of the party were chaired by ulema. Only technical and insignificant positions such as health and archaeological committees were headed by non-clerical figures. Furthermore, the non-clerical figures were mostly acting on behalf of their senior clerical leaders. But an opening of the party to the growing secular intelligentsia meant that their monopoly over the political leadership of Hazara society risked being undermined.

While a few of Wahdat's founders continued to exercise leadership and political power, most others were not as lucky. The failure to revive party structures left many of them politically marginalised. Second rank officials of Hezb-e Wahdat, such as most members of the central council, have mostly been unable to find a state job. Many of them opted to reside in their home areas in the Hazarajat, far away from leaderships in Kabul.

== Political fragmentation ==
The situation of Hezb-e Wahdat in early 2009 and its political fragmentation can best be explained by the leadership style of its leaders. In the immediate aftermath of the fall of the Taliban, Khalili was widely recognised as leader of the party. In April 2002 he flew to Kabul from Bamyan, in a move that shifted the party headquarters to Kabul. He was warmly received by Mohaqiq, who was deputy chair and Planning Minister of the Interim Administration, and other senior figures of the organisation. In the Transitional Administration, Khalili replaced Mohaqiq as a vice-president, becoming the highest Hazara official in the government. Until before the presidential election of 2005, Muhaqiq was at least officially heading the political affairs committee of Hezb-e Wahdat in Kabul. Their relationship, however, soon started unravelling. Apparently, Muhaqiq had adopted a more confrontational approach within the government on the issues of development and reconstruction plans in Hazara areas. It is alleged that his powers as the Minister of Planning were being transferred to the more powerful and assertive finance ministry, under the leadership of the western educated technocrat Ashraf Ghani. Mohaqiq left the cabinet in controversy in 2004. Khalili and Mohaqeq have since engaged in personal rivalry and competition for power within the government as well as for leadership among the Hazaras. Their rivalry came to the fore when Mohaqiq decided to stand as a candidate for presidential elections in 2005 and Khalili ran as the second vice-president with Hamid Karzai. Subsequently, Mohaqiq joined the main opposition alliance, the Understanding Front, led by Yunus Qanuni. By standing in opposition to the government, he championed the rights of Hazaras and continued to undermine Karim Khalili. The personalisation of leadership was not limited to Mohaqiq and Khalili and resulted in the fragmentation of the party into the following four splinter organizations.

1. Hezb-e Wahdat Islami Afghanistan (Karim Khalili)

2. Hezb-e Wahdat Islami Mardum-e Afghanistan (Muhammad Mohaqiq)

3. Hezb-e Wahdat Milli Islami Afghanistan (Muhammad Akbari)

4. Hezb-e Wahdat Islami Millat-e Afghanistan (Qurban Ali Erfani)

== Publications ==
- Mosharekat-e Melli Weekly, a weekly magazine

== Glossary of Dari (Afghan Persian) words ==
Most of these terms are loanwords from Arabic.

Dari Words	Meaning/Comment
Etelaf	Alliance
Etefaq	Agreement
Hezb	Party
Misaq	Covenant
Mujahideen	plural of 'mujahed', holy fighters, the militants that fought the jihad against the Soviet occupation of Afghanistan in the 1980s.
Nahzat/Harakat	Movement
Nasr	Victory
Pasdaran	Guardians
Shura	Council, Assembly
Wahdat	Unity, Oneness

== See also ==
- List of Islamic political parties
- People's Islamic Unity Party of Afghanistan
- National Islamic Unity Party of Afghanistan
