= Sazman-i Nasr =

Afghanistan ethnic militant group

- Leaders: Muhammad Hussain Sadiqi; Abdul Ali Mazari; Shaykh Shafak
- Dates active: 1980s
- Ideology: Shia Islamism; Hazara nationalism Shariatism
- Part of: Tehran Eight (1987-1989)
- Wars: the Soviet–Afghan War

Sazman-i Nasr (Dari: سازمان نصر, lit. 'Organization of Victory') was a Hazara militant group, opposed to the leftist Afghan government during the 1980s. After the Revolutionary Council of Islamic Unity of Afghanistan, Nasr was the elite militant group. The organisation included many young men educated in Kabul, among them Shia clergymen, and received support from the Iranian government. It was a part of the Tehran Eight political constellation after 1987.
