= Hazarajat =

Region in the central highlands of Afghanistan

Coordinates: 34.8167°N 67.8167°E

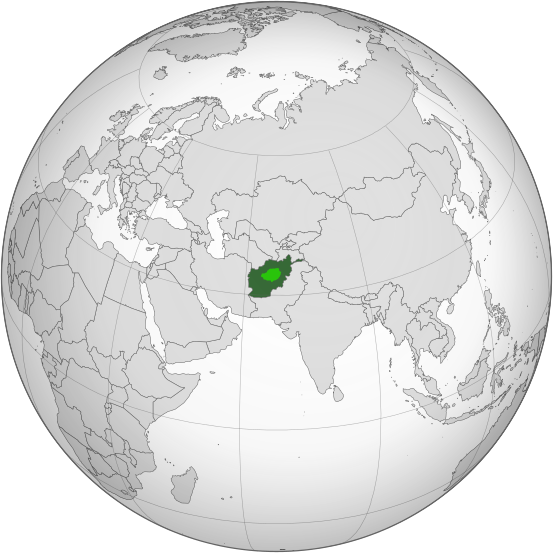

- Hazaristan flag
- Area: Approx: 80,000 sq mi (207,199 km^{2})
- Population: circa 8,000,000
- Density: 50/km^{2} (130/sq mi)
- Provinces within Hazaristan: Bamyan, Daikundi and large parts of Ghor, Ghazni, Uruzgan, Parwan, Maidan Wardak, and more.
- Ethnicity: Hazaras
- Languages spoken: Dari (Hazaragi dialect)

Hazarajat (Dari: (Note: Dari pronunciation: [ʔä.zɑː'ɾä.d͡ʒɑ́ːt̪]; Hazaragi: آزره‌جات, Hazaragi pronunciation: [ʔɔːz.ɾä.d͡ʒɔːt̪]) هزاره‌جات), also known as Hazaristan (Dari: (Note: Dari pronunciation: [ʔä.zɑː'ɾɪs.t̪ʰɑ́ːn]; Hazaragi: آزرستان, Hazaragi pronunciation: [ʔɔːz.ɾis.t̪ʰɔ́ːn]) هزارستان), is a mostly mountainous region in the central highlands of Afghanistan, among the Kuh-e Baba mountains in the western extremities of the Hindu Kush. It is the homeland of the Hazara people, who make up the majority of its population. Hazarajat denotes an ethnic and religious zone.

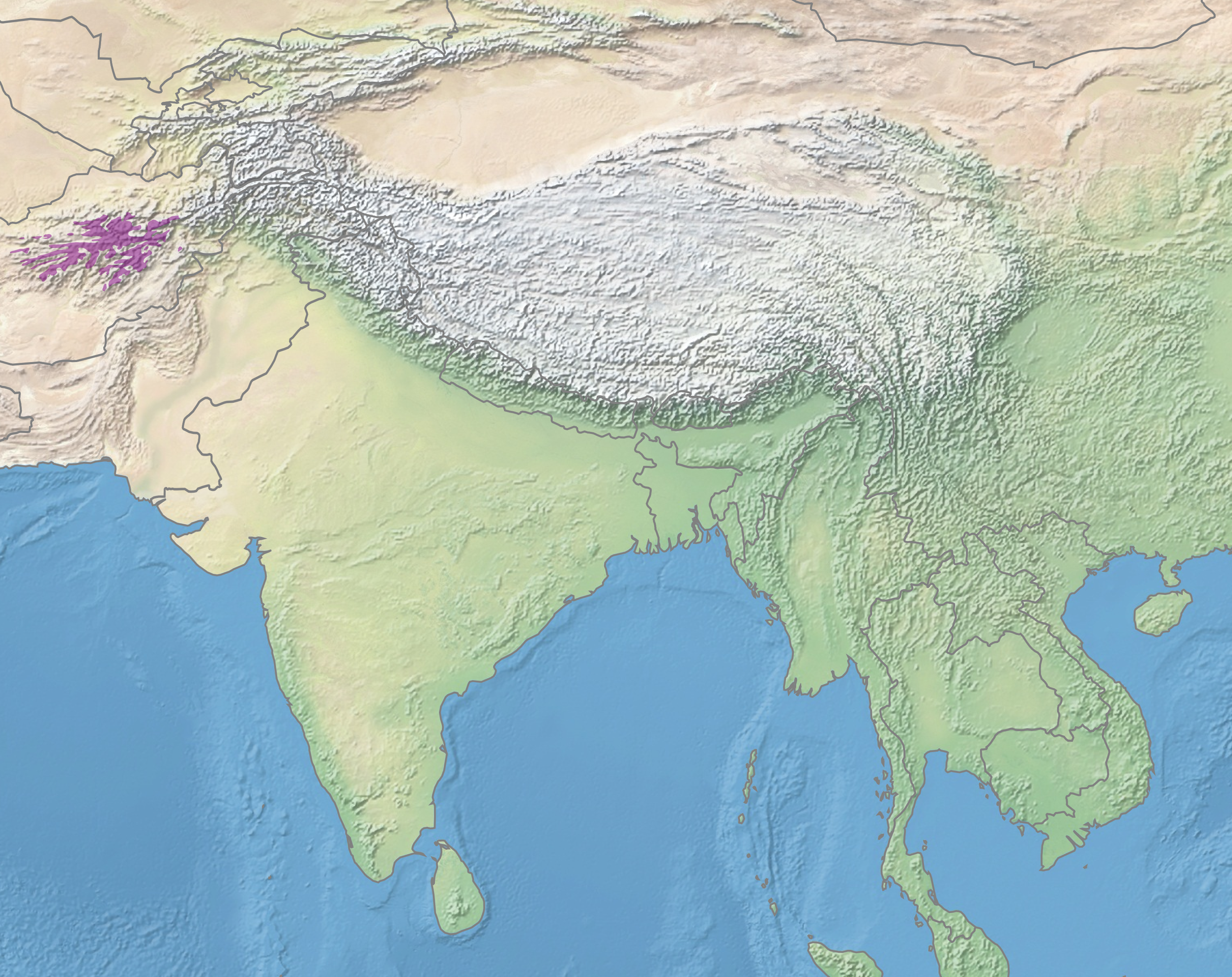
The approximate area of Hazarajat is marked in purple

Hazarajat is primarily made up of the provinces of Bamyan and Daikundi, with portions of Ghazni, Zabul, Ghor, Maidan Wardak, Sar-e-Pol, Balkh, Samangan, Uruzgan, and Parwan. The most populous towns in Hazarajat are Bamyan, Yakawlang (Bamyan), Nili (Daikundi), Lal wa Sarjangal (Ghor), Sang-e-Masha (Ghazni), Gizab (Daikundi) and Behsud (Maidan Wardak). The Kabul, Arghandab, Helmand, Farah, Hari, Murghab, Balkh, and Kunduz rivers originate from Hazarajat.

== Etymology and usage ==
The Hazara people and surrounding peoples use the names "Hazarajat" or "Hazaristan" to identify the historic Hazara lands. "Hazarajat" is a compound of "Hazara" and the Persian suffix "jat", which is used to make words associated with land in the south, central and west Asia and "Hazaristan" is a compound of "Hazara" and the Persian suffix ـستان -stan means "land" or "place of".

== Geography ==
Until the 1880s, the Hazarajat region was completely autonomous and the central government of Kabul had barely succeeded in governing the region, with facing continuous rebellions from the Hazara people.

=== Topography ===
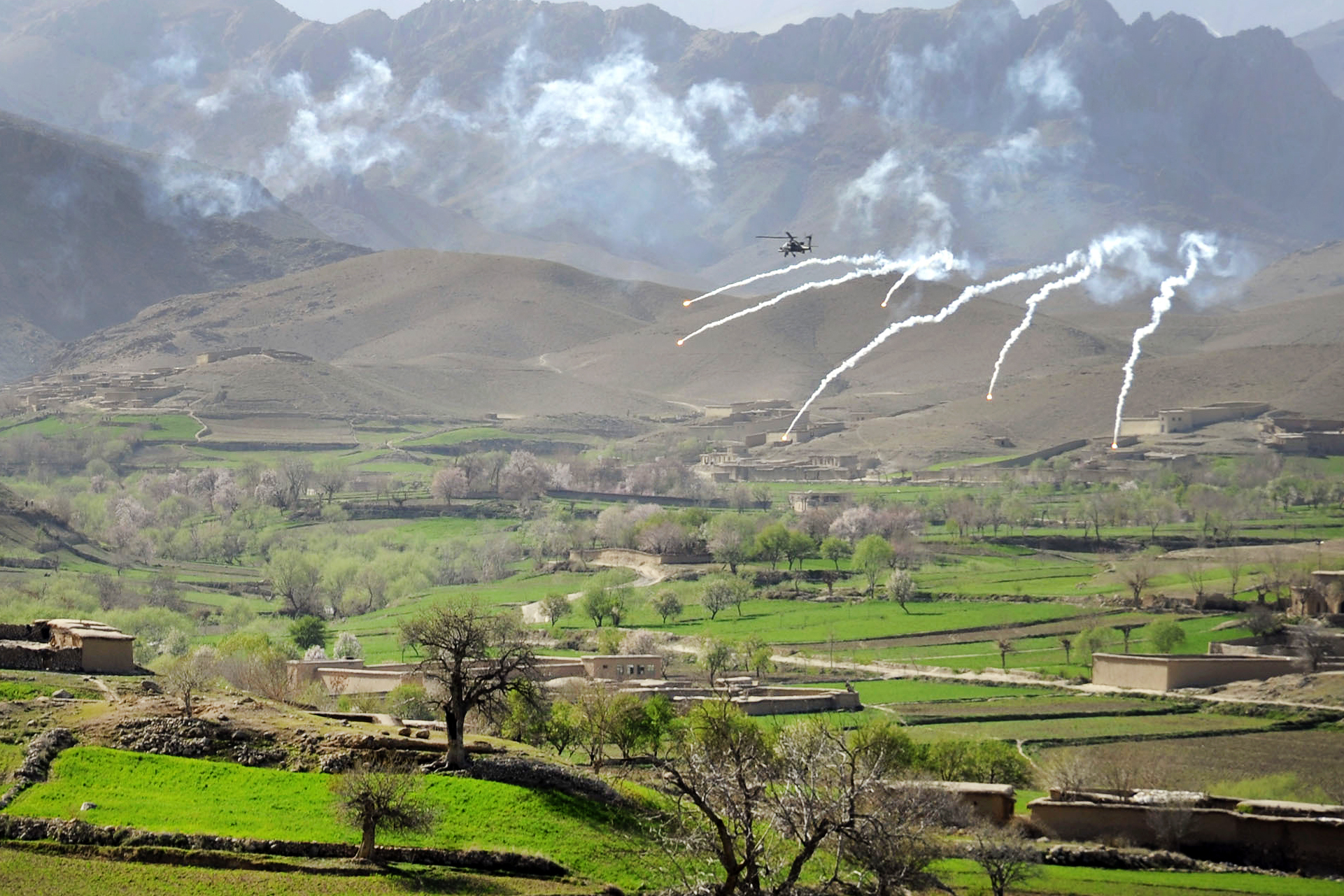
An AH-64 Apache helicopter shoots flares over a valley to support members of the 8th Commando Kandak and coalition special operations forces during a firefight in Kajran district, Daykundi Province

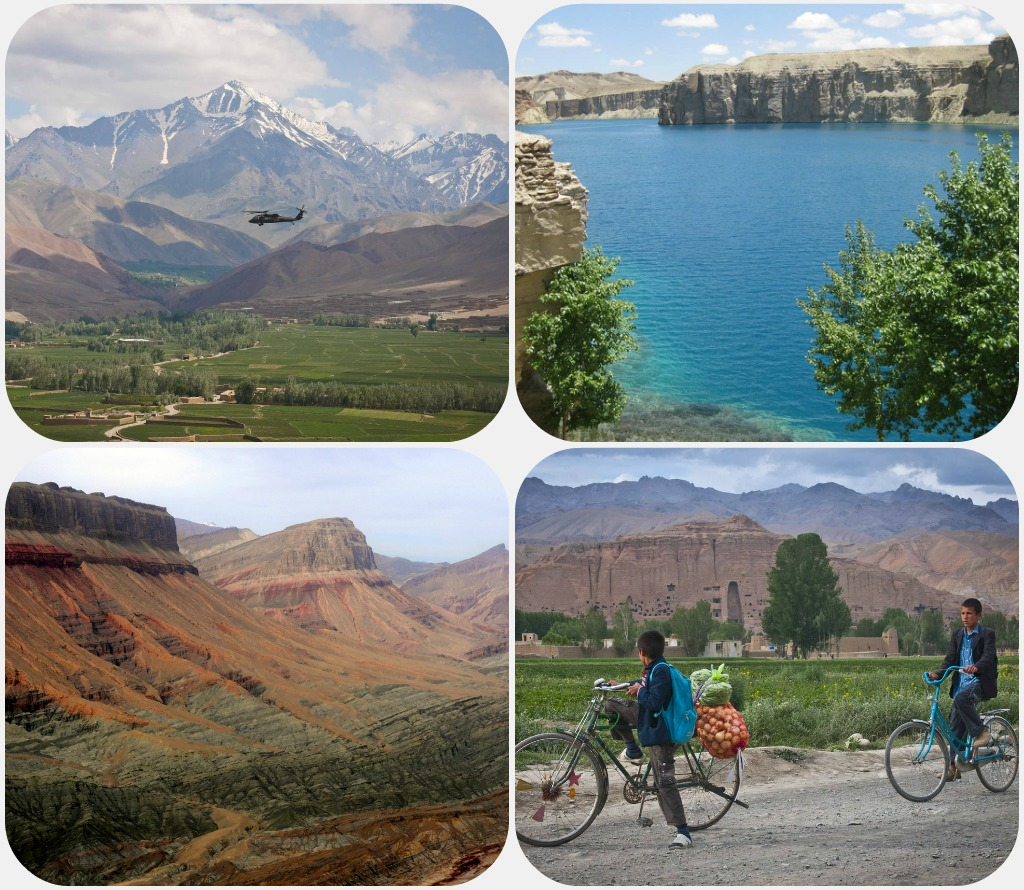
Bamyan Province

The Hazarajat lies in the central Afghan highlands, among the Koh-e Baba mountains and the western extremities of the Hindu Kush. Its boundaries have historically been inexact and shifting. Its physical limitations, however, are roughly marked by the Bā-miān Basin to the north, the headwaters of the Helmand River to the south, Firuzkuh to the west, and the Unai Pass to the east. The regional terrain is mountainous and extends to the Safid Kuh and the Siāh Kuh mountains, where the highest peaks reach between 15,000 feet (4,600 m) and 17,000 feet (5,200 m). Both sides of the Kuh-e Bābā range contain a succession of valleys. The north face of the range descends steeply, merging into low foothills and small semi-arid plains, while the south face stretches towards the Helmand Valley and the mountainous district of Behsud.

Northwestern Hazarajat encompasses the district of Ghor, long known for its mountain fortresses. The 10th-century geographer Estakhri wrote that mountainous Ghor was "the only region surrounded by Islamic territories and yet inhabited by infidels". The long resistance of the inhabitants of Ghor to the adoption of Islam indicates the region's inaccessibility; according to some travelers, the entire region is comparable to a fortress raised in the upper Central Asian highlands: from every approach, tall and steep mountains have to be traversed to reach the area. The language of the inhabitants of Ghor differed so much from that of the people of the plains that communication between the two required interpreters.

The northeastern part of the Hazarajat is the site of ancient Bamyan, a center of Buddhism and a key caravanserai on the Silk Road. The town stands at a height of 7,500 feet (2,300 m), surrounded by the Hindu Kush to the north and Koh-i Baba to the south. The Hazarajat was considered part of the larger geographic region of Khurasan (Kushan), the porous boundaries of which encompassed the vast region between the Caspian Sea and the Oxus River, thus including much of present-day Northern Iran and Afghanistan.

=== Climate ===
Hazarajat is mountainous, and a series of mountain passes extend along its eastern edge. One of them, the Salang Pass, is blocked by snow six months out of the year. Another, the Shibar Pass, at a lower elevation, is blocked by snow only two months out of the year. Bamyan is the colder part of the region, with severe winters.

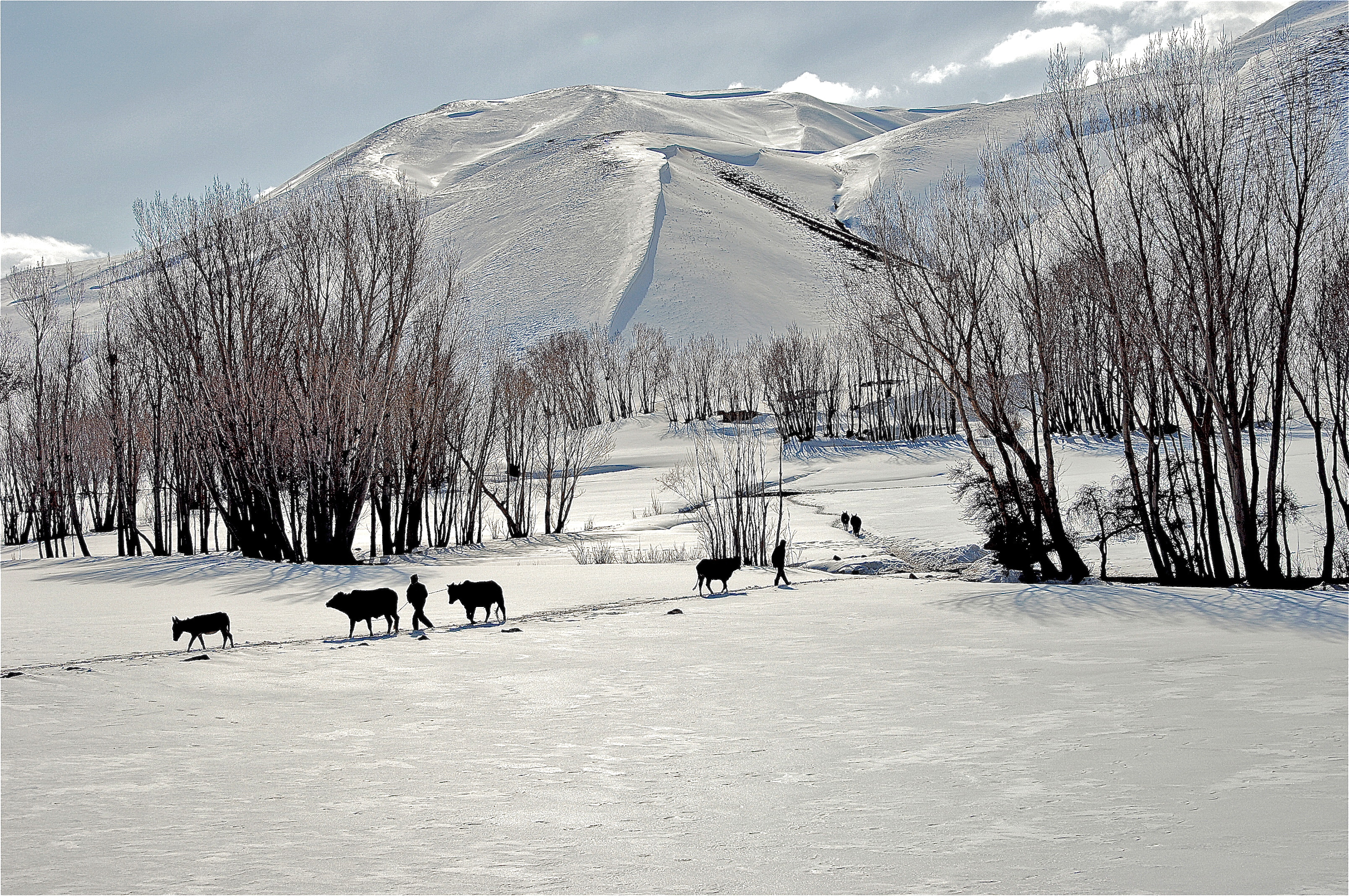
Winters in central Afghanistan can be brutally cold with temperatures as low as −20 °C (−4.0 °F)

Hazarajat is the source of the rivers that run through Kabul, Arghandab, Helmand, Hari, Murghab, Balkh, and Kunduz; during the spring and summer months it has some of the greenest pastures in Afghanistan. Natural lakes, green valleys and caves are found in Bamyan.

== History ==
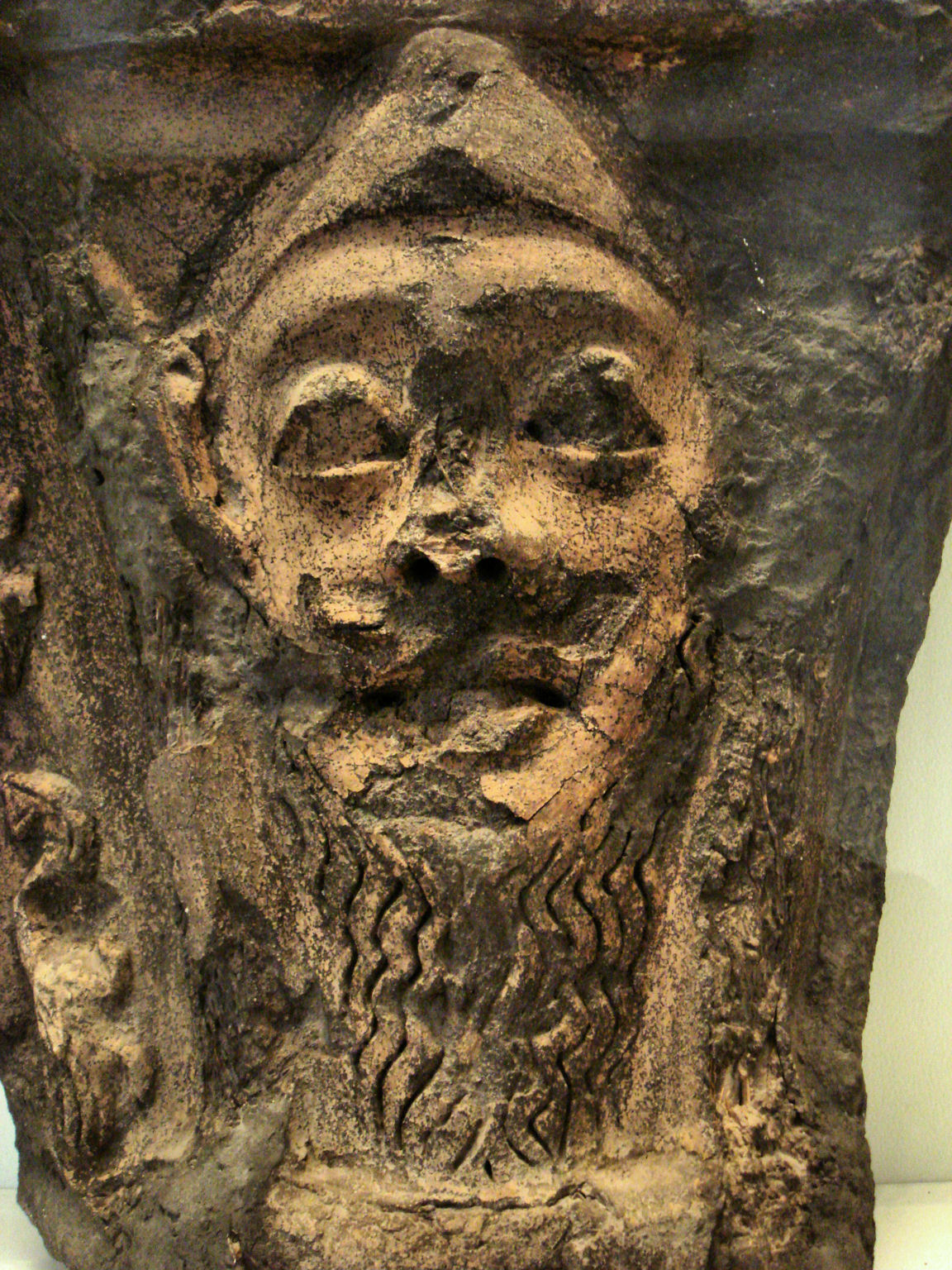
Statue of a bearded man with cap, probably Scythian, 3–4th century AD

The area was ruled successively by the Achaemenids, Seleucids, Mauryas, Kushans, and Hephthalites before the Saffarids Islamized it and made it part of their empire. It was taken over by the Samanids, followed by the Ghaznavids and Ghurids before falling to the Delhi Sultanate. In the 13th century, it was invaded by Genghis Khan and his Mongol army. In the following decades, the Qarlughids emerged to create a local dynasty that offered a few decades of self-rule. Later, the area became part of the Timurid dynasty, the Mughal Empire and the Durrani Empire. The subjugation of the Hazarajat, particularly the mountain fortresses of Bamyan, proved difficult for the invaders at their conquest of the region. "adopted the language of the vanquished".

=== 19th century ===
In the 18th and 19th centuries, a sense of "Afghan-ness" developed among the Hazaras and the Pashtuns began to coalesce. It has been suggested that in the 19th century there was an emerging awareness of ethnic and religious differences among the population of Kabul. This brought about divisions along "confessional lines" that became reflected in new "spatial boundaries". During the reign of Dost Mohammad Khan, Mir Yazdanbakhsh, a diligent chief of the Behsud Hazaras, consolidated many of the districts they controlled. Mir Yazdanbakhsh collected revenues and safeguarded caravans traveling on the Hajigak route through Bamyan to Kabul through Sheikh Ali and Behsud areas. The consolidation of the Hazarajat thus increasingly made the region and its inhabitants a threat to the Durrani state.

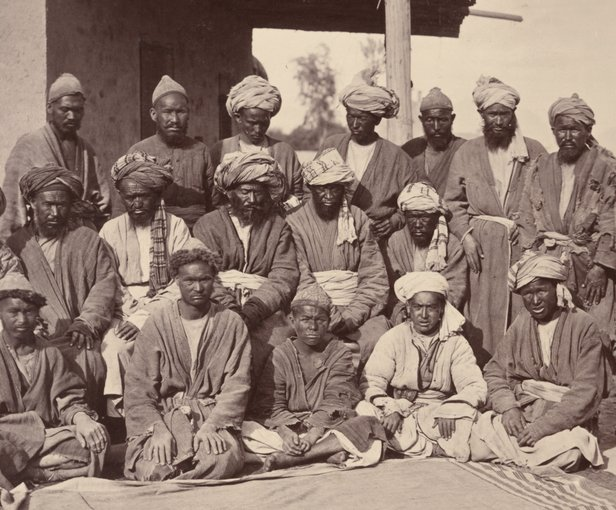
Behsudi Hazara chieftains in 1879

Until the late 19th century, the Hazarajat remained somewhat independent and only the authority of local chieftains was obeyed. Joseph Pierre Ferrier, a French author who supposedly traveled through the region in the mid-19th century, described the inhabitants settled in the mountains near the rivers Balkh and Kholm "The Hazara population is very less but ungovernable, and has no occupation but pillage; they will pillage and pillage only, and plunder from camp to camp". Subsequent British travelers doubted whether Ferrier had ever actually left Herat to venture into Afghanistan's central mountains and have suggested that his accounts of the region were based on hearsay, especially since very few people entered the Hazarajat; Pashtun nomads (Kuchi people) would not take their flocks to graze there, and few caravans would pass through.

Afghanistan's Kuchi people, who are unsettled nomads who migrate between the Amu Darya and the Indus River, temporarily stayed in Hazarajat during some seasons, where they overran Hazara farmlands and pastures. Increasingly during summers, these nomads would camp in large numbers in the Hazarajat highlands.

The travels of Captains P. J. Maitland and M. G. Talbot from Herat, through Obeh and Bamyan, to Balkh, during the autumn and winter of 1885, explored the Hazarajat proper. Maitland and Talbot found the entire length of the road between Herat and Bamyan difficult to traverse. As a result of the expedition, parts of the Hazarajat were surveyed on one-eighth inch scale and thus made to fit into the mapped order of modern nation-states. More thought and attention was put into demarcating the definite borders of modern nations than ever before, which entailed great difficulties in frontier regions such as the Hazarajat.

During the Second Anglo-Afghan War, Colonel T. H. Holdich of the Indian Survey Department referred to the Hazarajat as "great unknown highlands". And for the next few years, neither the Survey nor the Indian Intelligence Department succeeded in obtaining any trustworthy information on the routes between Herat and Kabul through the Hazarajat.

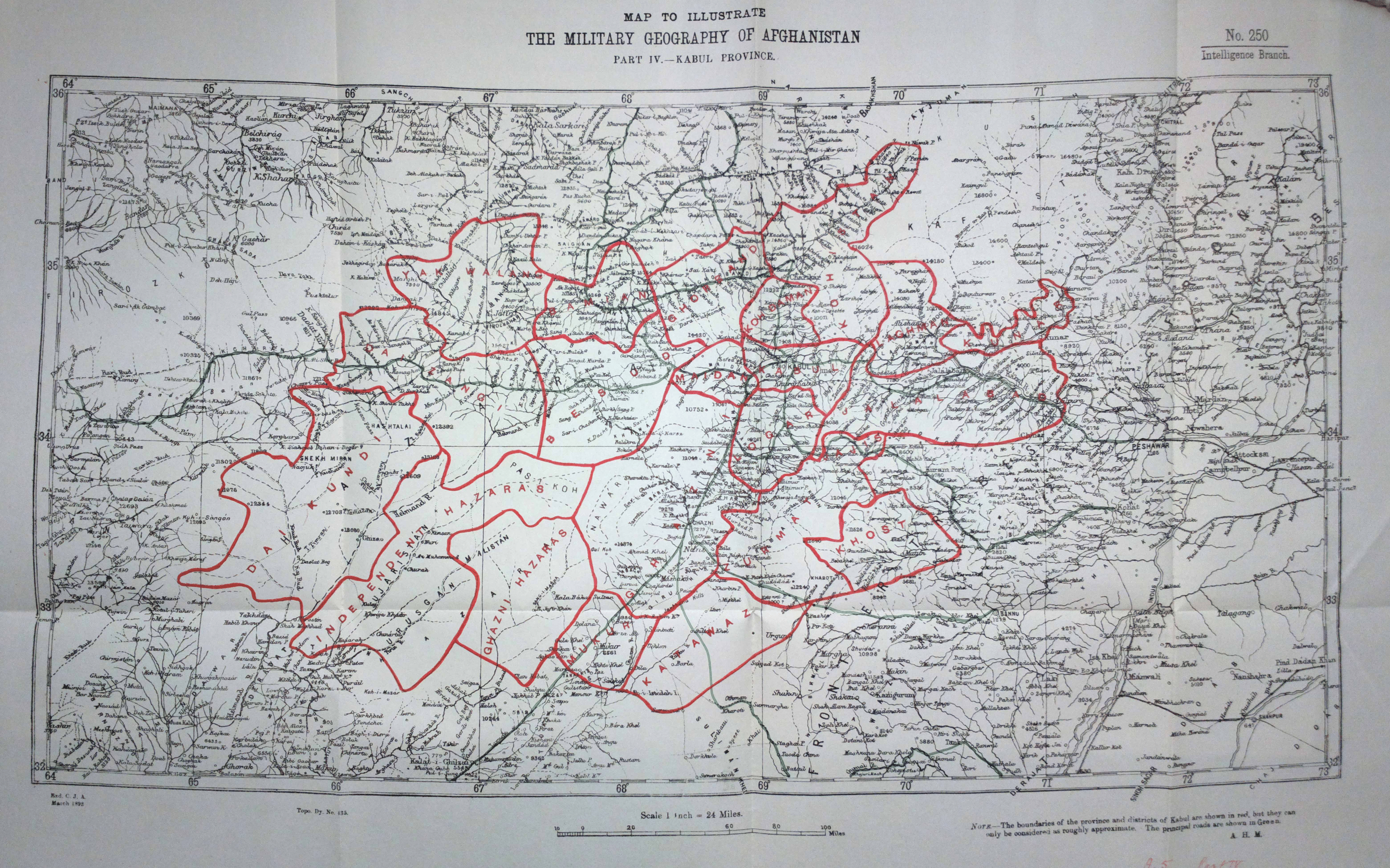
Map of Kabul Province in 1893, illustrating the boundaries of different Hazara tribes

Various members of the Afghan Boundary Commission were able to gather the information that brought the geography of remote regions such as the Hazarajat further under state surveillance. In November 1884, the Commission crossed over the Koh-e Baba mountains by the Chashma Sabz Pass. General Peter Lumsden and Major C. E. Yate, who surveyed the tracts between Herat and the Oxus, visited the Qala-e Naw Hazaras in the Paropamisus mountain range, to the east of the Jamshidis of Kushk. Noting surviving evidence of terraced cultivation in times past, both described the northern Hazaras as semi-nomadic with large flocks of sheep and black cattle. They possessed an "inexhaustible supply of grass, the hills around being covered knee-deep with a luxuriant crop of pure rye". Yate noted clusters of kebetkas, or the summer dwellings of the Qala-e Naw Hazaras on the hillsides and described "flocks and herds grazing in all directions".

The geographical reach of the authority of the Afghan state was extended into the Hazarajat during the reign of Abdur Rahman Khan. Caught between the strategic interests of foreign powers and disappointed by the demarcation of the Durand Line in southern Afghanistan, which cut into Pashtun territory, he set out to bring the northern peripheries of the country more firmly under his control. This policy had disastrous consequences for the Hazarajat, whose inhabitants were singled out by Abdur Rahman Khan's regime as particularly troublesome: "The Hazara people had been for centuries past the terror of the rulers of Kabul".

=== 20th and 21st century ===
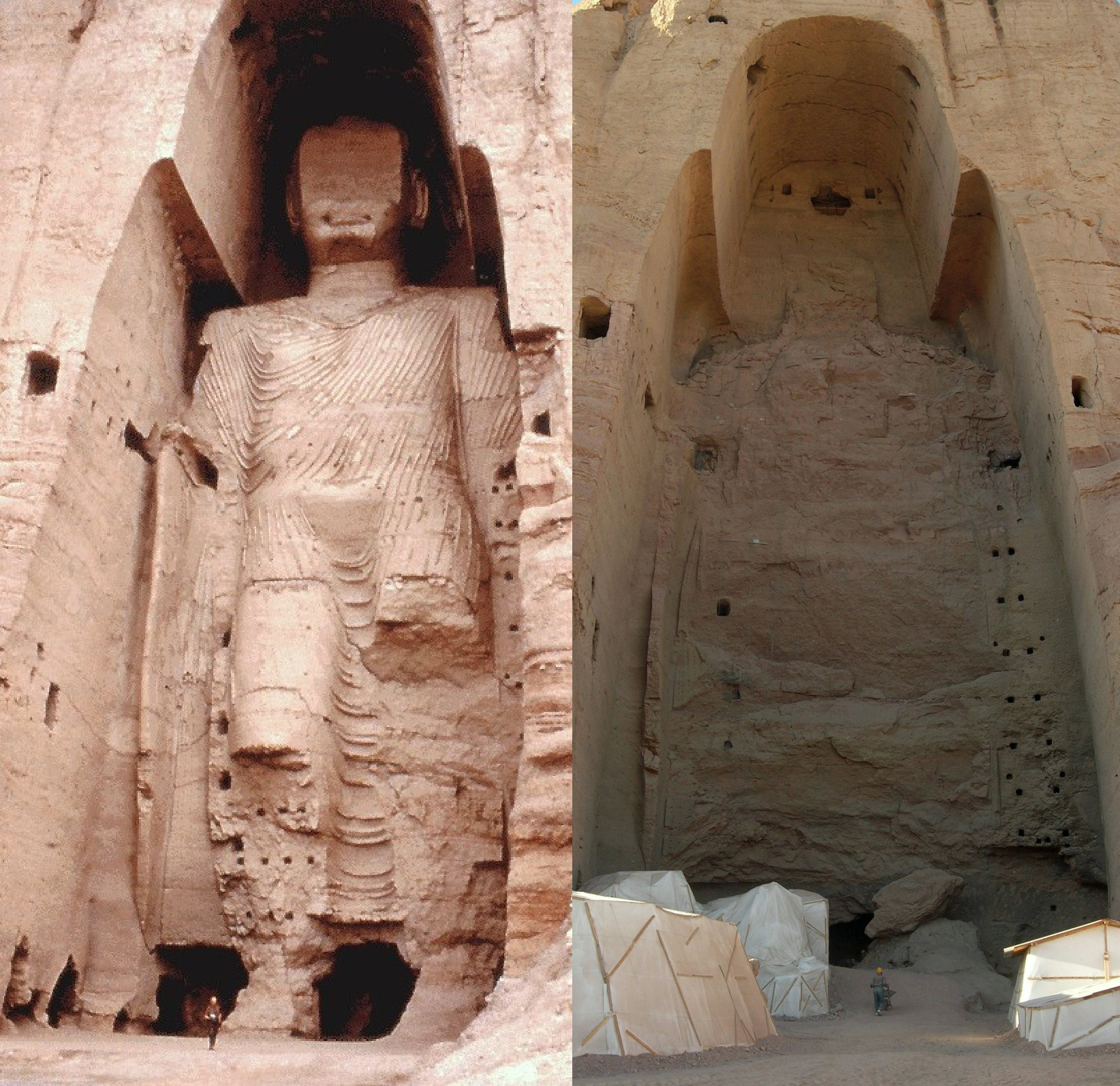
Taller, 55 metres (180 ft) Buddha in 1963 and in 2008 after destruction.

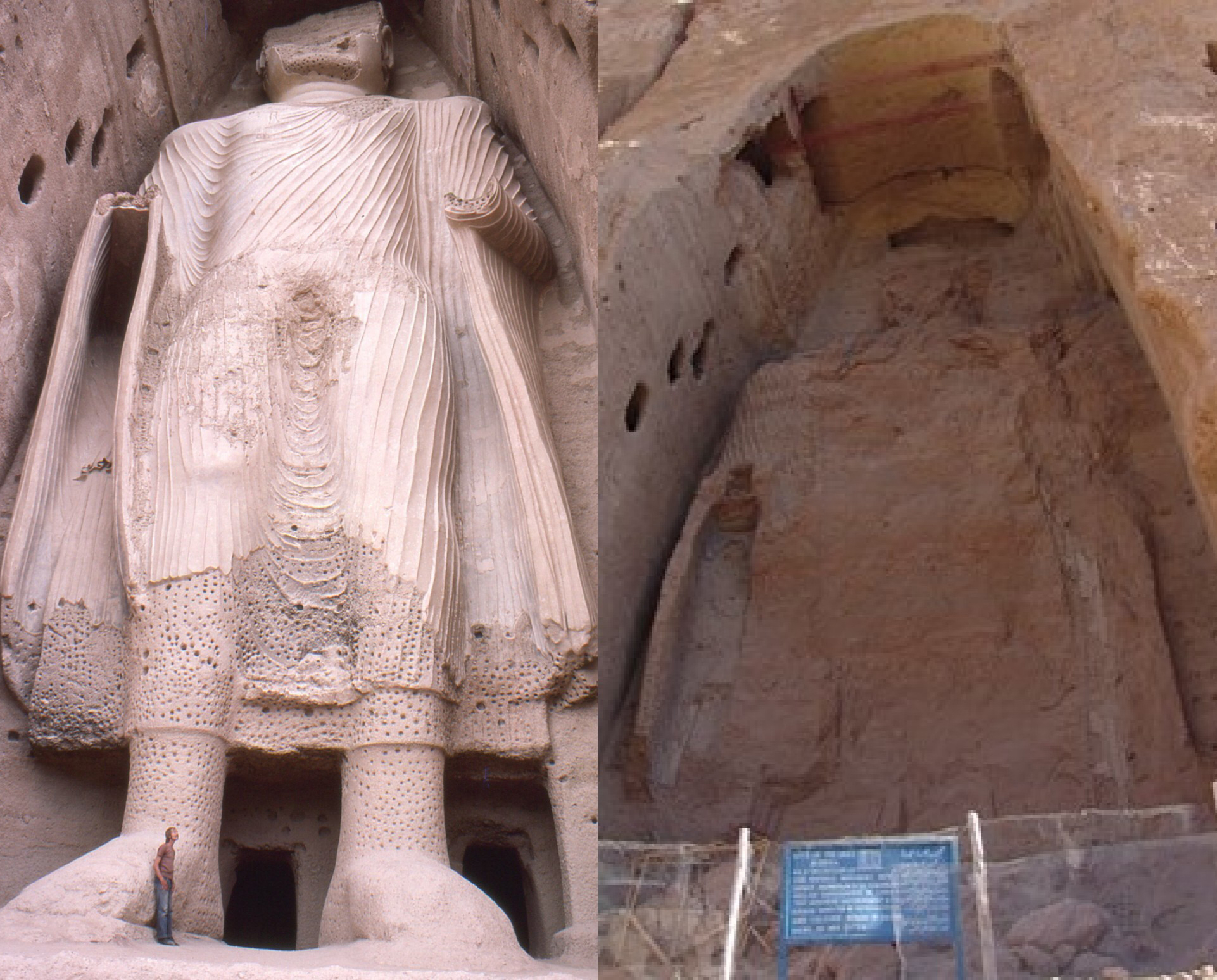
Smaller, 38 metres (125 ft) Buddha, before and after destruction.

In the 1920s the ancient Shibar Pass road which leads through Bamyan and east to the Panjshir Valley was paved for lorries, and it remained the busiest road across the Hindu Kush until the building of the Salang tunnel in 1964 and the opening of a winter route. The Hazarajat became increasingly depopulated as Hazaras migrated to cities and to surrounding countries, where they became laborers and undertook the hardest and lowest-paid work.

In 1979, there were reportedly one and a half million Hazaras in the Hazarajat and Kabul, although a reliable census has never been taken in Afghanistan. As the Afghan state weakened, uprisings broke out in the Hazarajat, freeing the region from state rule by the summer of 1979 for the first time since the death of Abdur Rahman Khan some Hazara resistance groups were formed in Iran, including Nasr and Sipah-i Pasdaran, with some being "committed to the idea of a separate Hazara national identity". During the war with the Democratic Republic of Afghanistan, most of the Hazarajat was unoccupied and free of Soviet or state presence. The region became ruled once again by local leaders, or mirs, and a new stratum of young radical Shiʿi commanders. Economic conditions are reported to have improved in the Hazarajat during the war, when Pashtun Kuchis stopped grazing their flocks in Hazara pastures and fields. The group ruling Hazarajat was the Revolutionary Council of Islamic Unity of Afghanistan or Shura-e Ettefaq, led by Sayyid Ali Beheshti. The region's geographic nature and un-strategic location meant that the government and Soviets ignored it as they fought rebels elsewhere. This effectively allowed the Shura-i Ettefaq administration to rule over the region and give autonomy to the Hazaras. Their politically opposing groups were mostly educated, secular and left-wing. Between 1982 and 1984, an internal civil war caused the Shura to be overthrown by the Sazman-i Nasr and Sepah-i Pasdaran groups. However inter-factional rivalry continued thereafter. Most of the Hazara groups united in 1987 and 1989 and formed the Hizb-e-Wahdat.

During the rule of the Taliban, once again, ethnic and sectarian violence struck Hazarajat. In 1997, a revolt broke out among Hazara people in Mazar-e Sharif when they refused to be disarmed by the Taliban; 600 Taliban were killed in subsequent fighting. In retaliation, the genocidal policies of Amir Abdur Rahman Khan's era were adopted by the Taliban. In 1998, six thousand Hazaras were killed in the north; the intention was ethnic cleansing of Hazara. At that stage, Hazarajat does not exist as an official region; the area comprises the administrative provinces of Bamyan, Ghor, Maidan Wardak, Ghazni, Oruzgan, Juzjan, and Samangan. In March 2001, two giant Buddhist statues, Buddhas of Bamiyan, were also destroyed even though there was a lot of condemnation.

== Demographics ==
=== Ethnic groups ===
The Hazaras constitute the majority of the Hazarajat population.

=== Language ===
People in Hazarahat speak in Hazaragi an eastern dialect of Persian. Additionally, this accent is different in each different regions. Most popular accents in Hazarajat are Behsudi, Jaghori, Daikunki and north Afghanistan.

== Health ==
A 1989 report noted that common diseases in the Hazarajat region included gastrointestinal infections, typhoid, whooping cough, measles, leprosy, tuberculosis, rheumatoid arthritis, and malaria. 45 cases of leprosy were reported in 2017.

== See also ==
- The hazara people
- Afghanistan’s geography
