= List of Hazara people =

The Hazaras are an ethnic group from Afghanistan. Provinces in Afghanistan where Hazara tribes form the majority are colloquially known as Hazarajat. They constitute roughly 20%–25% of Afghanistan's population population of Afghanistan, though some estimates suggest their share could be as high as 30%. Many Hazara as part of the Afghan diaspora live in Asian countries like Iran and Pakistan, and Western countries such as Australia, Sweden, Germany, Norway, Italy, the UK, and the US.

== Politicians ==
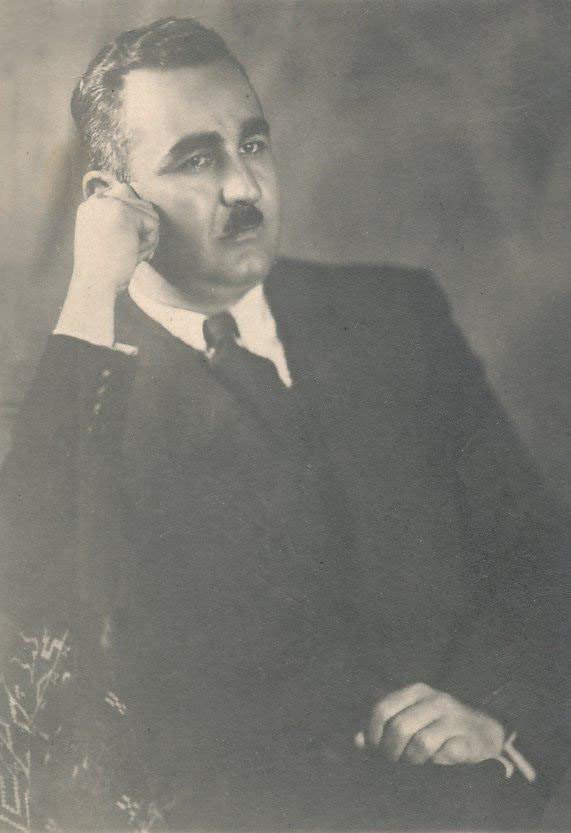
Muhammad Yusuf Khan Hazara, a politician and the first Sunni representative member in the Iran Parliament

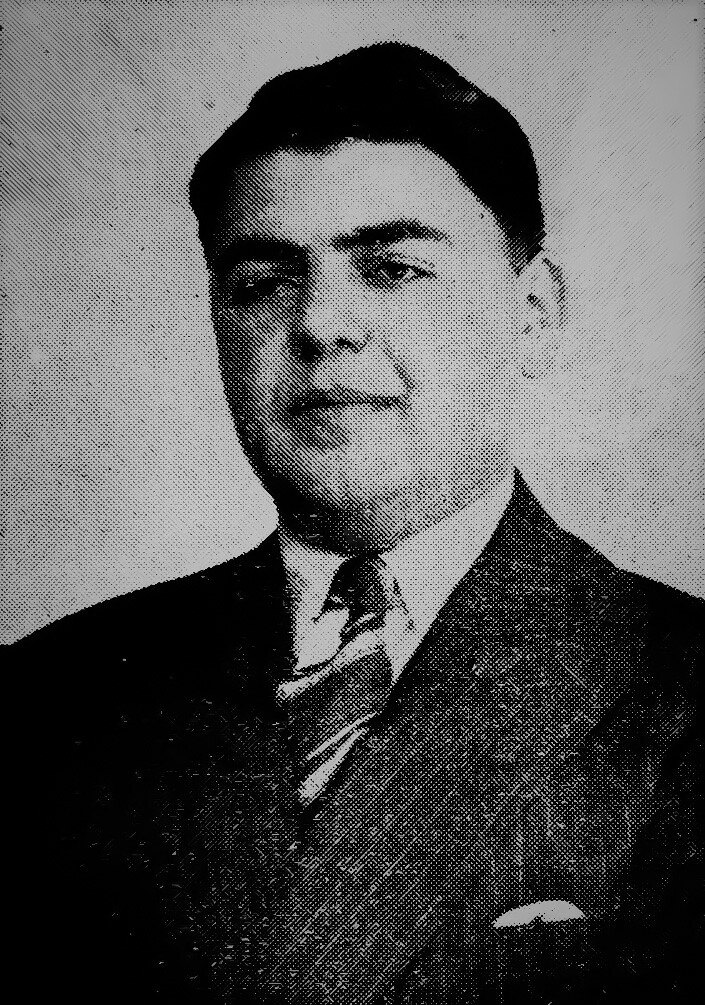
Qazi Muhammad Isa, a politician and a Pakistan movement activist.

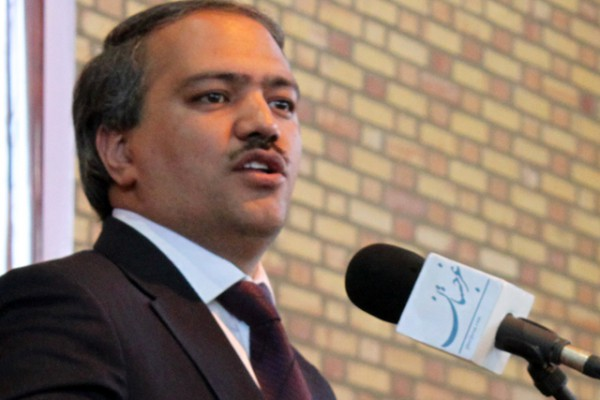
Ahmad Behzad, a politician and the former member of the Afghanistan Parliament

- Abdul Ali Mazari
- Muhammad Yusuf Khan Hazara
- Qazi Muhammad Isa
- Muhammad Ibrahim Khan
- Abdul Karim Misaq
- Karim Khalili
- Rawnaq Naderi
- Ramazan Juma Zada
- Abdul Khaliq Hussaini
- Sadat Mansoor Naderi
- Sayed Jafar Naderi
- Farkhunda Zahra Naderi
- Khushnood Nabizada
- Sultan Ali Keshtmand
- Daoud Naji
- Ramazan Bashardost
- Muhammad Mohaqiq
- Habiba Sarabi
- Sima Samar
- Hussain Ali Yousafi
- Muhammad Ali Jawid
- Maryam Monsef
- Abdul Khaliq Hazara
- Akram Yari
- Ahmad Behzad
- Jan Ali Changezi
- Qurban Ali Urozgani
- Abdul Haq Shafaq
- Sayed Anwar Rahmati
- Azra Jafari
- Sayyid Ali Beheshti
- Shah Gul Rezai
- Sarwar Danish
- Sayed Nasir Ali Shah
- Haji Sayed Hussain Hazara
- Abdul Wahed Sarābi
- Azizullah Royesh
- Ahmad Shah Ramazan
- Dawood Ali Najafi
- Abdul Qayyum Sajjadi
- Ghulam Ali Wahdat
- Muhammad Hussain Sadiqi Nili
- Nasrullah Sadiqi Zada Nili
- Sayed Mustafa Kazemi
- Abbas Ibrahim Zada
- Muhammad Arif Shah Jahan
- Sayed Hussain Anwari
- Sayyed Mohammad Eqbal Munib
- Rahila Bibi Kobra Alamshahi
- Zahera Ahmadyar Mawlayee
- Abdul Taleb Zaki
- Asadullah Saadati
- Ghulam Husain Naseri
- Fahim Hashimi
- Abbas Noyan
- Muhammad Hussain Fahimi
- Sayed Mansur Naderi

== Military personnel ==
- General Muhammad Musa Khan
- Abdul Ali Mazari
- Mehdi Mujahid
- Commander Shafi Hazara
- Ali Reza Tavassoli
- General Khudaidad Khan
- General Murad Ali Murad
- Air Marshal Sharbat Ali Changezi
- Younus Changezi
- Ali Dost Khan

== Religious figures ==
- Muhammad al-Fayadh
- Mohaqiq Kabuli
- Sayed Kayan
- Sayed Mansur Naderi
- Ismael Balkhi
- Sayyid Ali Beheshti
- Ali Mohaqiq Nasab
- Hassan Allahyari

== Writers, poets and people in the media ==
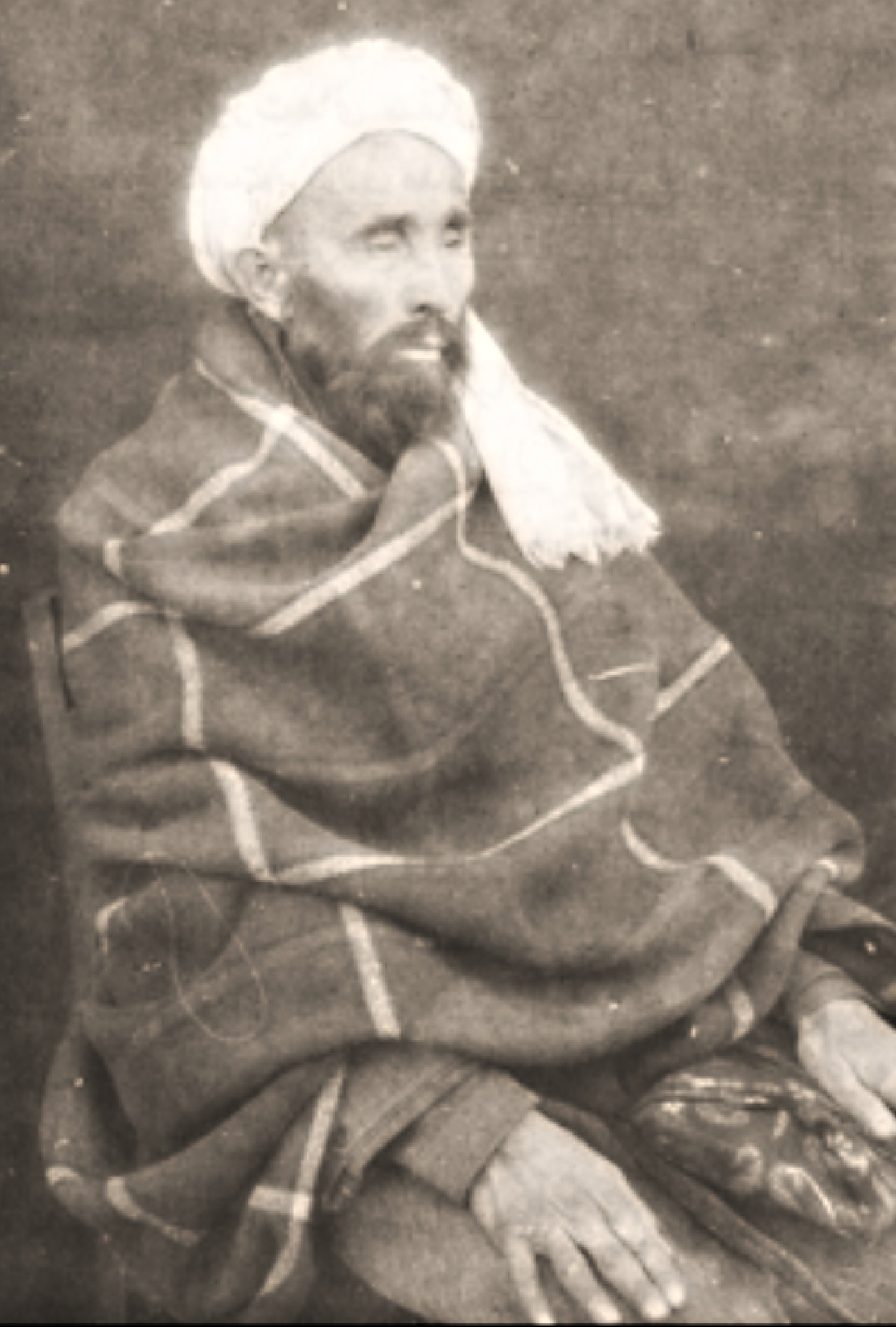
Faiz Muhammad Kateb, a prominent writer and historian

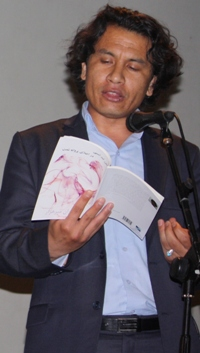
Kamran Mir Hazar

- Faiz Muhammad Kateb
- Amir Khosrow Dehlavi
- Hassan Poladi
- Ismael Balkhi
- Haji Kazim Yazdani
- Kamran Mir Hazar
- Basir Ahang
- Mohsin Changezi
- Sayed Askar Mousavi
- Ali Baba Taj
- Ali Mohaqiq Nasab
- Qasim Akhgar
- Rawnaq Naderi
- Sayed Abutalib Mozaffari
- Jalila Haider
- Najaf Mazari
- Abdur Rahman Mahmudi

=== Actors ===
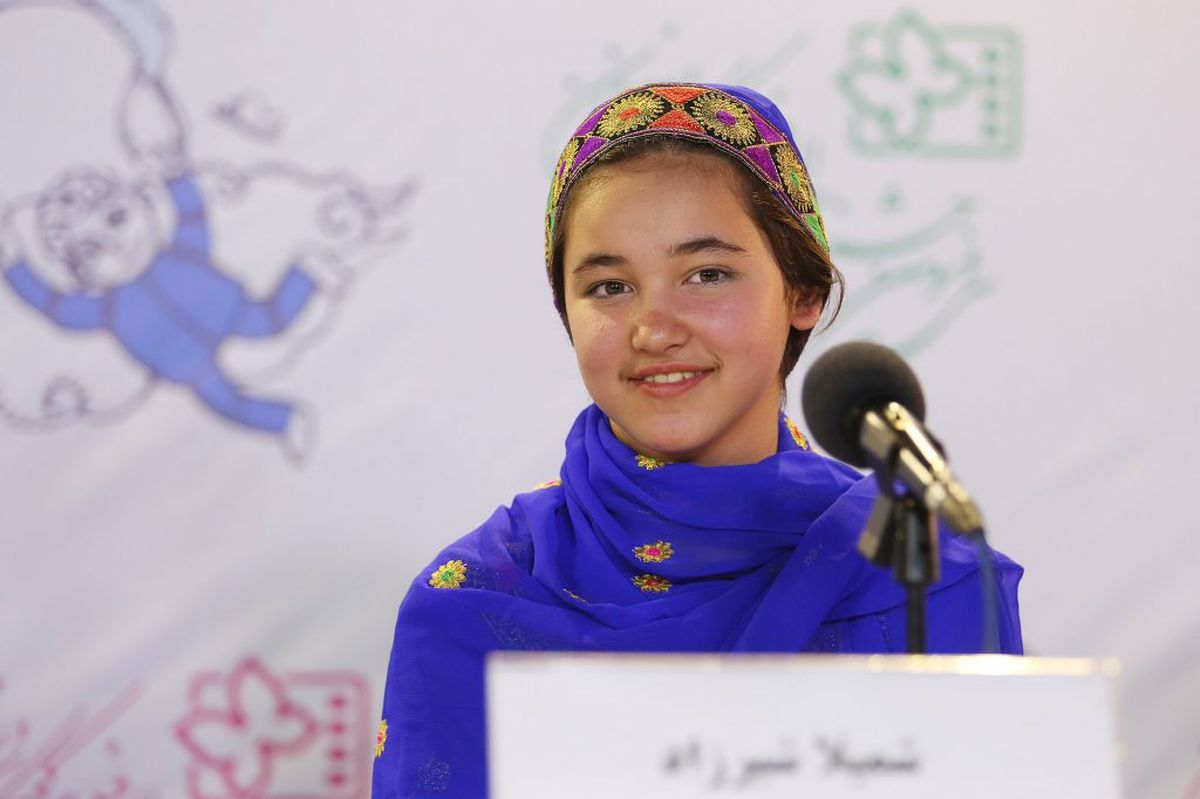
Shamila Shirzad

- Atossa Leoni
- Shaima Rezayee
- Hussain Sadiqi
- Abid Ali Nazish
- Nikbakht Noruz
- Shamila Shirzad

=== Singers ===
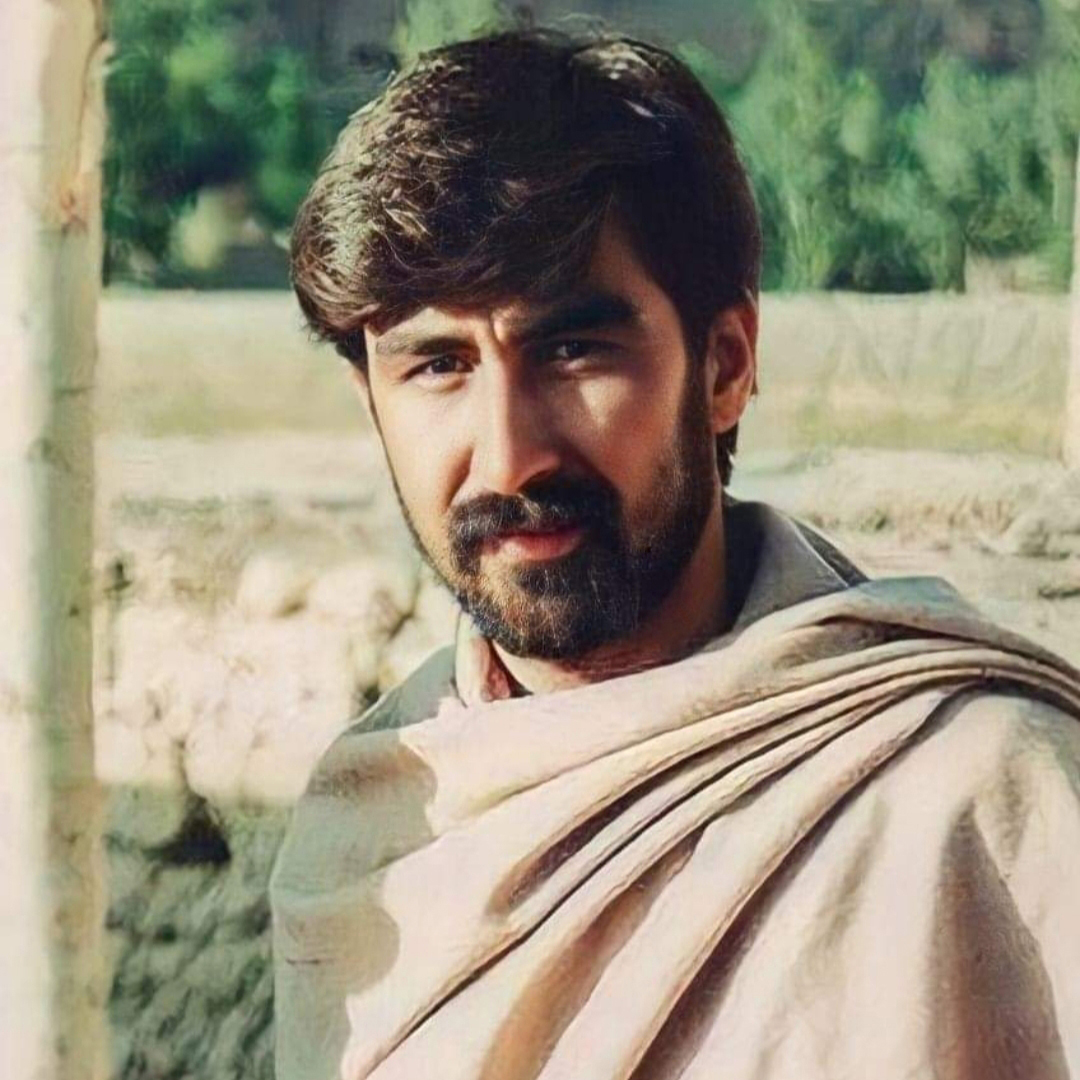
Dawood Sarkhosh

- Sarwar Sarkhosh
- Dawood Sarkhosh
- Zahir Howaida
- Safdar Tawakoli
- Sayed Anwar Azad
- Elaha Soroor
- Shakeeb Hamdard
- Mr. Capone-E
- Nusrat Fateh Ali Khan (Allegedly)

=== Photographers ===
- Barat Ali Batoor

=== Journalists ===
- Mansoor Ali Khan
- Malek Shafi'i
- Madina Jaffari
- Mahnaz Angury

=== Directors ===
- Burhan Qurbani

== Sports ==
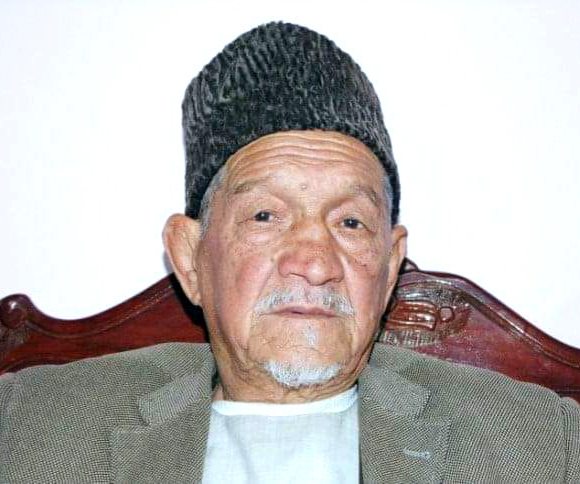
Mohammad Ebrahim Khedri

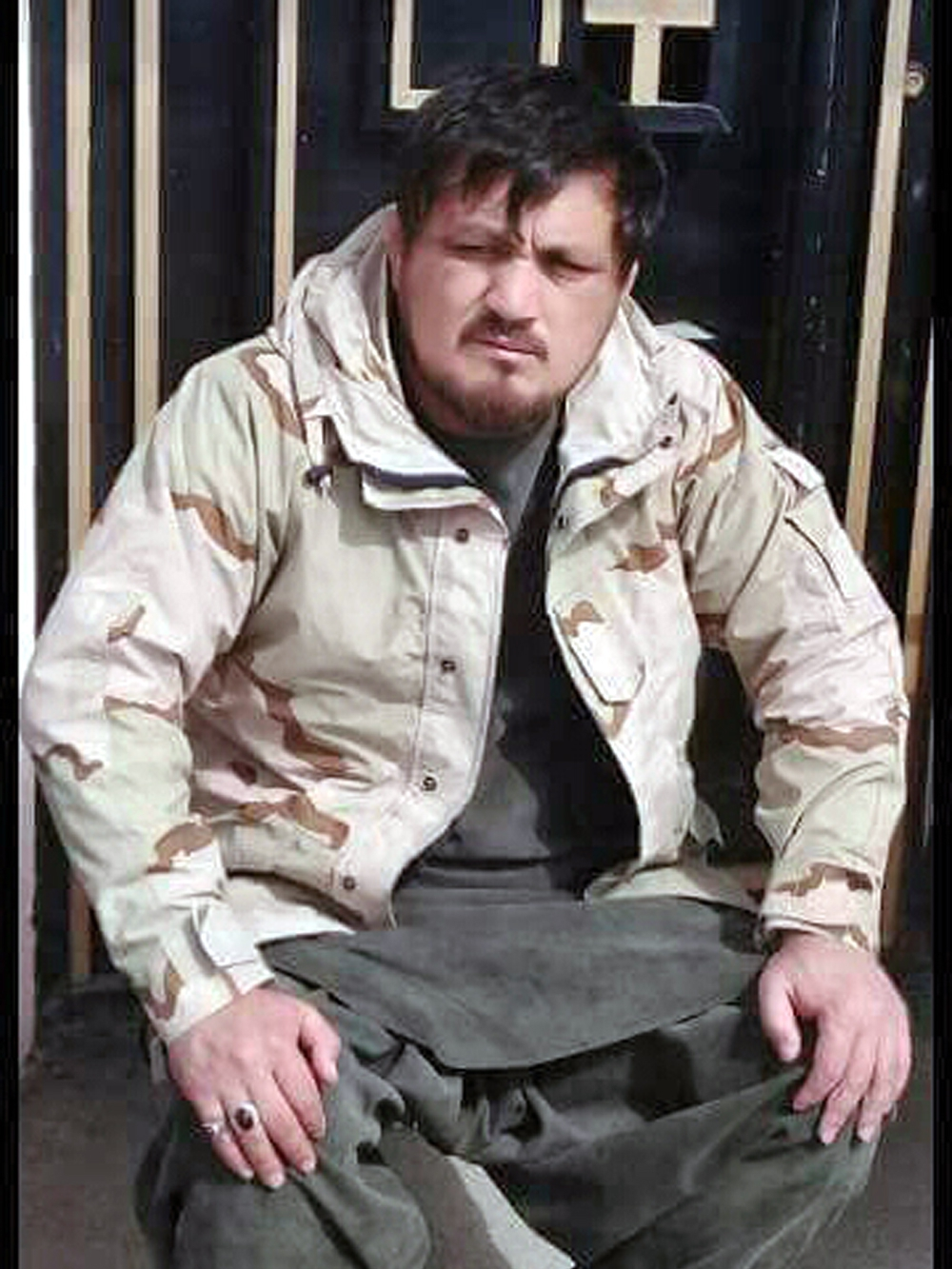
Wakil Hussain Allahdad

=== Football ===
- Zohib Islam Amiri
- Moshtaq Yaqoubi
- Mustafa Amini
- Qayyum Changezi
- Younus Changezi
- Rajab Ali
- Muhammad Ali
- Rahmat Akbari
- Zahra Mahmoodi
- Khodadad Azizi
- Mohsin Ali
- Masih Saighani
- Omran Haydary
- Zelfy Nazary
- Massih Wassey
- Moshtaq Ahmadi
- Omid Musawi

=== Boxing ===
- Asghar Ali Changezi
- Haider Ali
- Abrar Hussain
- Hamid Rahimi

=== Karate ===
- Kulsoom Hazara
- Meena Hazara
- Nargis Hameedullah
- Shahida Abbasi

=== Taekwondo ===
- Rohullah Nikpai,
- Zakia Khudadadi,

=== Judo ===
- Friba Razayee

=== Wrestling ===
- Wakil Hussain Allahdad
- Mohammad Ebrahim Khedri
- Mohammad Zahir Waseeq

=== Wushu ===
- Hussain Sadiqi

=== Martial arts ===
- Ali Ahmadi

=== Bodybuilding ===
- Ali Reza Asahi

=== Tennis ===
- Muzammil Murtaza

== Business ==
- Fatema Akbari
- Fahim Hashimi
- Sadat Mansoor Naderi

== Physicists ==
- Shakardokht Jafari

== Others ==
- Abdul Khaliq Hazara
- Nila Ibrahimi
- Shukria Tabassum
- Qazi Faez Isa

== See also ==
- List of Afghans
