= The Hazara People and Greater Khorasan =

Mardum-i Hazara Wa Khorasan-i Buzurg
- Author: Muhammad Taqi Khavari
- Language: Persian
- Subject: Hazara people
- Publisher: M Ibrahim Afghanistani
- Publication date: 2006
- Pages: 335
- ISBN: 978-9640643167

Mardum-i Hazara Wa Khorasan-i Buzurg (The Hazara people and Greater Khorasan) is Persian language book about the history and origins of the Hazara people by Muhammad Taqi Khavari.

== See also ==
- The Hazaras of Afghanistan by Sayed Askar Mousavi
- The Hazaras by Hassan Poladi
