= Hazara diaspora =

Diaspora of Afghan ethnic group

Total population
- 10-12 million

Regions with significant populations
- Pakistan: 900,000 (2011)
- Iran: 500,000 (2014)
- Europe: 130,000
- Turkey: 26,000
- Austria: 22,000 (2015)
- Australia: 41,766 (2021)
- Sweden: 50,000 (2021)
- Syria: 14,000 (2015)
- United Kingdom: 12,000 (2015)
- United States: 10,000
- Netherlands: 9,000
- Canada: 4,300 (2006)
- Indonesia: 3,800

Languages
- Dari and Hazaragi (eastern varieties of Persian)

Religion
- Predominantly Islam (Shia majority, significant Sunni minority)

The Hazara people are an ethnic group who are mostly from Afghanistan, primarily from the central regions of Afghanistan, known as Hazarajat, they established a large diaspora that consists of many communities in different countries around the world as part of the later Afghan diaspora. There are currently a million Hazara who live in the Balochistan province of Pakistan mostly in Quetta, many of whom have been settled in the country for generations and are now Pakistani citizens.

== Overseas communities ==
=== Australia ===
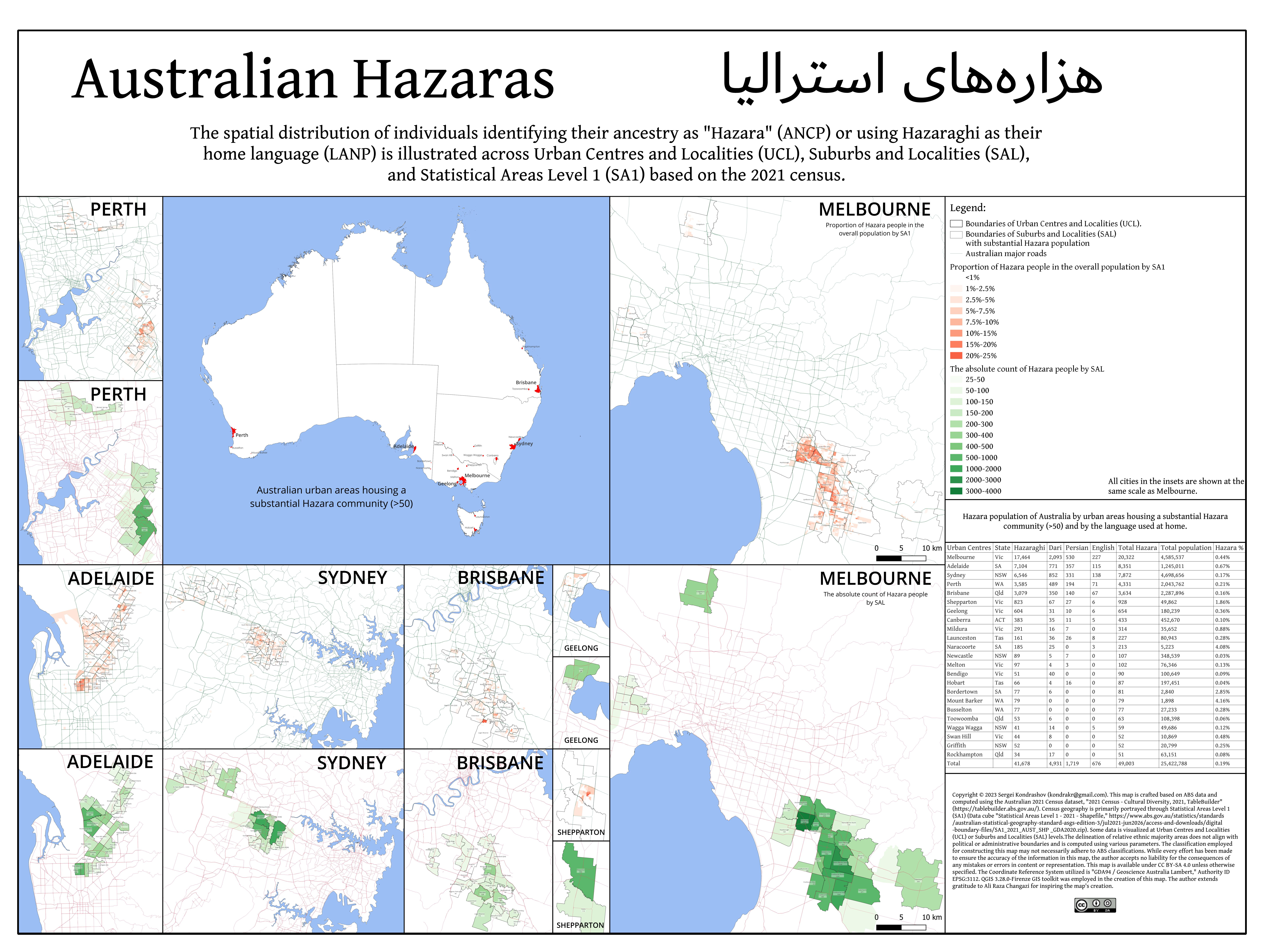
Geographic distribution of the Australian population identifying their ancestry as “Hazara” or using Hazaraghi as their home language

The Hazara Council of Australia is an organization formed by the Hazara community of Australia. Arman Monthly is a Persian-language magazine distributed nationwide which is published by the Hazara community. The 2003 Australian documentary film Molly & Mobarak is based on a Hazara asylum seeker who enters Australia, falls in love with a local girl and faces possible deportation as his temporary visa nears expiration.

=== India ===
The Attarwala of India claim to be descended from a group of Mughal Hazara soldiers who were initially settled in Agra, during the rule of the Mughal Emperor Jahangir. According to their recorded documents, they then migrated to Ahmedabad via Gwalior, Ratlam and Godhra. This migration followed their participation of the community in the 1857 Indian War of Independence. Once settled in Gujarat, the community took up the occupation of manufacturing of perfumes known as ittars. The word attarwala means the manufacturer of perfumes. A second migration took place in 1947 from Agra, after the partition of India, with some members immigrating to Pakistan, while others joining their co-ethnics in Ahmedabad. The Attarwala are now found mainly in Ahmedabad, while those in Pakistan are found mainly in Karachi.

=== Indonesia ===
The Hazaras in Indonesia are mostly victims of the conflict in Afghanistan who fled from ethnic and religious persecution by the Taliban. Some Hazaras in Indonesia only stop temporarily before seeking asylum in other countries such as Australia, Malaysia, and Singapore. The arrival of the Hazara in Indonesia initially came from Jakarta then many of them moved to the Puncak area and then some of them lived and settled and married with local peoples.

=== United States ===
In the United States, there are reportedly 10,000 Hazaras mostly immigrating from Afghanistan and Pakistan. Some notable people from the community include Hassan Poladi, a writer and intellectual, Mr. Capone-E a rapper. and Shakeeb Hamdard, the first winner of Afghan Star, a TV reality show on Tolo TV in Afghanistan. There is fairly a large group of Hazara immigrants living in the Washington D.C. metro area whose members founded an association called Hazara American Association.

== See also ==
- Hazaras in Europe
- Hazara Australians
- Afghan Australians
- Pakistani Australians
