= Fahimi =

Fahimi (Arabic: فهيمي) is a surname. Notable persons with the surname include:

- Babak Fahimi, American engineer
- Muhammad Hussain Fahimi, Afghan politician
- Nasser Fahimi (born 1974), political and ideological prisoner from Iran
- Yasmin Fahimi (born 1967), German politician
