= Behsudi (Hazara tribe) =

Major Hazara tribe

Behsudi or Behsud (Dari: بهسودی) are one of the major tribes of the Hazaras in Afghanistan.

== History ==
The notable history of the Behsud tribe starts from the 19th century when the 19th-century Behsud chieftain Mir Yazdan Bakhsh was one of the first Hazara chiefs, who tried in vain to unify all Hazaras.

In the Hazara resistance against the Soviet Union and later the Taliban most of the modern Hazara political leadership has emerged from the Behsuds. Afghan leaders from the Behsud tribe include Sultan Ali Keshtmand, the Prime Minister of Afghanistan from 1981 to 1989.

The people of Behsud in the past (from about five or six centuries ago) were scattered across a wide area of Afghanistan. Before the complete control of the Afghans, they had more or less influence over eastern regions Including the eastern Behsud, which takes its name from this ethnic group to significant parts of today's Maidan Wardak province. Since a large part of the Hazara population was nomadic in the past, the Behsudis would travel towards Jalalabad and Laghman during winters and camp in Hazarajat during summers. For example, the Behsud River in the foothills of the Qorigh mountains Is a relic from that time.

The grave of Baba Besud is located on the summit of that mountain. Hazara singers used to visit that grave before the turmoil of Abdul Rahman.

== Genetic Origins and Sub-tribal structure ==
The Behsudi tribe, a major Hazara tribe within the Hazara population. This tribe is mostly of Mongolic origin, Karluk turkic, and Iranic origin. The Hazaras of Behsud are divided into eight different sub-tribes. These are; Markazi Bihsud, Hisa-I-Awal Bihsud, Jalrez, Day Mirdad, Chak, Nirkh, Saydabad and Maydan Shahr.

Genetic studies have shown that Hazaras, including the Behsudi, possess a complex ancestry with significant Central Asian (Turkic) and East Asian (Mongolic) components alongside West Eurasian (Iranic) admixtures.

Y-chromosome analyses reveal a high prevalence of haplogroup C-M217, common among Mongolic populations, as well as West Eurasian haplogroups such as R1a1a-M17. Mitochondrial DNA studies also demonstrate a mixture of East and West Eurasian maternal lineages. This genetic diversity reflects the historical intermixing of Mongolic, Turkic, and Iranic peoples in the region.

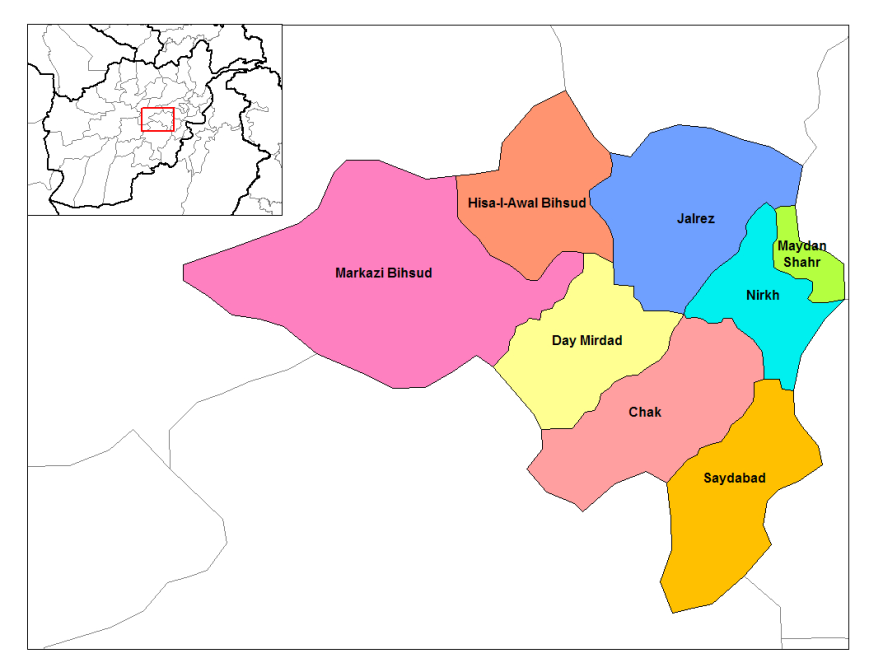
The sub tribes of the Behsudi tribe

Historically, the Behsudi are linked to Mongol tribes, with the name "Besud" mentioned in the 13th-century Secret History of the Mongols. The tribe consists of several sub-tribes, many bearing the prefix “Dai,” such as Dai Zangi and Dai Kundi, indicating their clan structure and heritage. Some smaller sub-tribes may have Turkic origins based on linguistic and cultural evidence, underscoring the ethnic complexity of the group.

The stated sub-tribes are mostly of Mongol origin whilst tribes like Day Mirdad are of Turkic origin because of the name starting with the prefix "Day/Dai" which is a Turkic attribute.

== Notable people ==
- Karim Khalili, former vice president of Afghanistan.
- Sultan Ali Keshtmand, the communist Prime Minister of Afghanistan (1981–1990).
- Mir Yazdan Bakhsh, an early 19th-century Hazara chieftain.
- Baiju Noyan, was a Mongol commander in Persia, Armenia, Anatolia, and Georgia.
- Nusrat Fateh Ali Khan, Renowned Pakistani Qawwali Singer, song writer, and music director.
- Sharbat Ali Changezi, Air Marshall Pakistan Air Force.
- Haji Kazim Yazdani, historical researcher and writer.
- Rohullah Nikpai, Taekwondo practitioner and two-time Olympic bronze medalist.

== See also ==
- List of Hazara tribes
- Hazara people

== Sources ==
- The Hazaras by Hassan Poladi
- The Hazaras of Afghanistan by Sayd Askar Musavi
- Hazaras of Afghanistan by Taimor Khanov, translated in Urdu by Hasan Raza Changazi
