= Muhammad Ali Beg (warlord) =

Tajik Warlord

Muhammad Ali Beg محمد علی بیگ
- Born: Sayghan, Afghanistan
- Died: 1835; Sayghan, Afghanistan
- Occupation: Warlord

Muhammad Ali Beg (?-1835) (Persian: محمد علی بیگ) was an independent Tajik warlord of Bamiyan province. Specifically in the district of Saighan and Bamiyan. He was known for his Slave-trade and harsh behaviour towards the Hazaras.

== Military campaigns ==
Muhammad Ali Beg was involved in multiple raidings of both Bamiyan (which was then controlled by Mir Yazdanbakhsh) and other parts of Hazarajat. After the battles he would take Hazaras as slaves and then sell them to the Mirs of Kunduz and the rulers of Bukhara.

In his last years he successfully infiltrated Bamiyan and assassinated the Hazara chief Mir Yazdanbakhsh becoming the ruler of almost all of Bamiyan privince.
