= The Hazaras of Afghanistan =

- Author: Dr. Sayed Askar Mousavi
- Language: English
- Subject: Hazara people
- Publisher: Palgrave Macmillan
- Publication date: August 1997
- Publication place: Afghanistan
- Pages: 265
- ISBN: 978-0312173869

The Hazaras of Afghanistan: An Historical, Cultural, Economic and Political Study is a book about the origins and history of the Hazara people of Afghanistan by Sayed Askar Mousavi.

== See also ==
- The Hazara People and Greater Khorasan by Muhammad Taqi Khavari
- The Hazaras by Hassan Poladi
