= Kazim Yazdani =

Kazim Yazdani کاظم یزدانی
- Born: 1948 (age 77–78); Behsud, Maidan Wardak Province, Kingdom of Afghanistan
- Occupations: Writer and historian
- Writing career
- Subjects: Afghanistan, Hazara people, Islam

Haji Kazim Yazdani (Dari: حاجی کاظم یزدانی) a historical researcher and a writer, was born in a Hazara family in central Afghanistan. He is among the top historical researchers and writers in the country. His work has been published in many articles and books. He is a well-respected writer as he did not use his research and written work as a way to earn income.

== See also ==
- List of Hazara people
- Faiz Mohammad Katib Hazara
- Hassan Poladi
- Sayed Askar Mousavi
