= Mangiacapre =

Mangiacapre is a surname. Notable people with the surname include:

- Lina Mangiacapre (1946-2002), Italian playwright and filmmaker
- Vincenzo Mangiacapre (born 1989), Italian boxer
