= Hazara Australians =

Ethnic and Social group

Australian Hazaras هزاره‌های استرالیا
Total population
- 41,766 (2021) (0.16% of the Australian population)

Languages
- Persian (Hazaragi and Dari); Australian English

Related ethnic groups
- Hazara diaspora

Hazara Australians, or Australian Hazaras (Dari: هزاره‌های استرالیا), are Australians who have Hazara ancestry. The Hazaras are an ethnic group native to, and primarily residing in, the mountainous region of Hazarajat in central Afghanistan. Many Hazara Australians have also migrated from Pakistan. The Hazara Council of Australia is an organization formed by the Hazara community of Australia. Hazaras constitute one of the largest ethnic groups of asylum seekers in Australia.

According to the 2021 Australian census, of the 59,797 Afghan-born Australians, 44.3% recorded their ancestry as Hazara, making Hazaras the second ethnic group amongst Australians born in Afghanistan. Including individuals born in Australia, the Hazara Australian population numbers 41,758 as of 2021.

== History ==
Before 1980, relatively few Hazaras came to Australia for educational purposes. During the 1980s Soviet–Afghan War and the 1990s civil war, over 5,000 Hazaras arrived in Australia. The Hazara Australian community has produced a sizable number of individuals notable in many fields, including law, medicine, engineering, teaching and business.

== Location ==
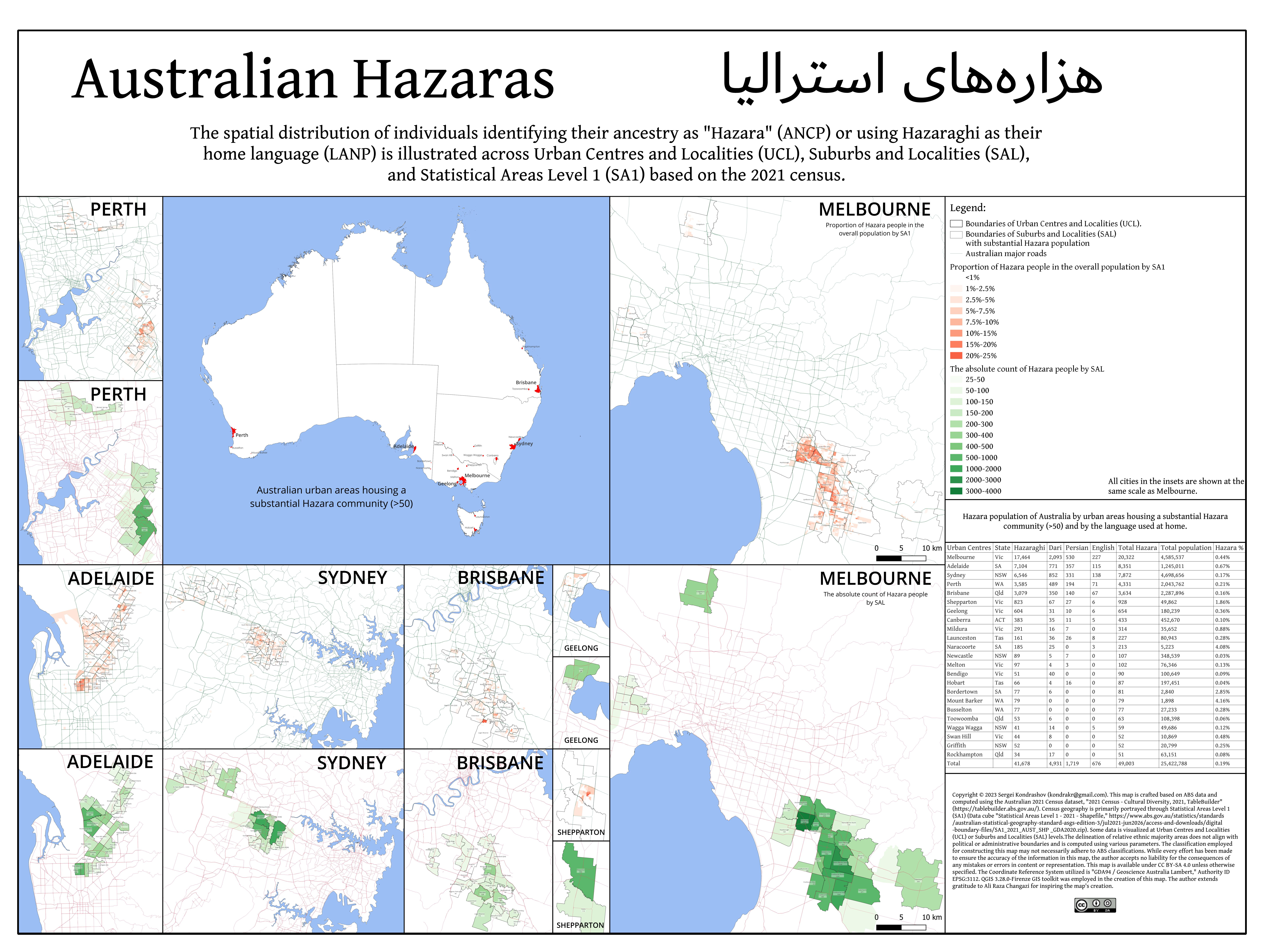
Geographic distribution of the Australian population identifying their ancestry as “Hazara” or using Hazaraghi as their home language.

By far the largest number of Australian Hazaras reside in Greater Melbourne, where, at the time of the 2021 census, there were 17,622 individuals with Hazara ancestry, representing 0.4% of the city's population. They are mainly concentrated in the South-Eastern suburbs, particularly in the LGA's of Casey (11,901 individuals), especially in the suburbs of Doveton and Narre Warren South, and Greater Dandenong (3,915 individuals), mainly within the suburb of Dandenong. There is also a small but growing Hazara community in Melbourne's west, mainly in the City of Brimbank, that numbered 466 individuals at the time of the 2021 Census, and in the city's north, mainly in the City of Hume, concentrated within the suburb of Craigieburn, that numbered 400 people.

The city with the second largest number of Hazara Australians is Adelaide, where 6,963 people identified their ancestry as Hazara at the 2021 census, representing 0.5% of the city's population. It also has the highest number of Australian Hazaras per capita of any major Australian city. They mostly live throughout the city's northern suburbs, particularly in the LGA's of Salisbury (3,355 individuals), mainly in the suburbs of Paralowie and Parafield Gardens, and Port Adelaide Enfield (1,920 individuals), almost exclusively in the suburbs of Kilburn and Blair Athol.

In Sydney, the 2021 census recorded 6,915 individuals with Hazara ancestry, representing just over 0.1% of the city's population. They are mainly concentrated in the city's west, mostly in the LGA of Cumberland (4,170 individuals), mainly in the suburbs of Auburn and Merrylands, and the LGA of Blacktown (949 individuals).

The 2021 Census recorded 3,717 Hazaras residing in Greater Perth, amounting to roughly 0.2% of the city's population. They mostly live in the Western suburbs, primarily within the City of Gosnells (1,628 people), mainly in the suburbs of Maddington and Gosnells with a smaller population in the north of the city, in the LGA of Swan (595 people).

In Greater Brisbane, the 2021 census recorded 3,088 individuals of Hazara ancestry, representing just over 0.1% of the city's population. The southern suburbs are where this community resides, mainly in Logan City (2,070 people), primarily within the suburbs of Marsden, Woodridge, and Loganlea.

Relatively few Hazara Australians live in regional areas, however there are significant populations in Shepparton (726 individuals), and Geelong (531 individuals), specifically the northern suburbs of Corio and Norlane.

== Language ==
Most Hazara Australians are fluent in English, but with their first language being the Hazaragi dialect of Persian.

== Media ==
Arman Monthly is a magazine distributed nationwide which is published by the Hazara community. The 2003 Australian documentary film Molly & Mobarak is based on a Hazara asylum seeker who enters Australia, falls in love with a local girl and faces possible deportation as his temporary visa nears expiration. dehmazang.org is online based news cultural platforms that cover Hazaragi events in Australia and documents anything related to Hazaras in its capacity.

== Notable people ==
- Hussain Sadiqi
- Ali Ahmadi
- Rahmat Akbari

== See also ==
- Australians
- Hazara diaspora
- Hazaras in Europe
- Afghan Australians
- Pakistani Australians
