= New Mexico Muslim killings =

2021–2022 crimes in New Mexico, U.S.

- Date: November 7, 2021 – August 5, 2022
- Location: Albuquerque, New Mexico
- Type: Ambush shooting
- Motive: Unknown
- Perpetrator: Muhammad Atif Syed
- Deaths: 4
- Verdict: Guilty of first-degree murder charge; Pleaded not contest to second-degree murder charges
- Convictions: First-degree murder; Second-degree murder (2 counts)

In Albuquerque, New Mexico, four Muslim men were killed between November 2021 and August 2022 in a series of ambush shootings. Albuquerque police initially investigated the killings as a possible hate crime. Muhammad Atif Syed, a 51-year-old Afghan-American man, was arrested as the suspect on August 9, 2022. Authorities were also seeking to detain his son on August 14, 2022. Syed has been convicted in one of the murders in March 2024, and pleaded no contest in other two in September 2024. His son has not been charged in any murder.

== Killings ==
The first victim, Mohammad Ahmadi, an Afghan American, was killed on November 7, 2021, outside of a business he ran with his brother. On July 26, 2022, Aftab Hussein, a Pakistani American of the Hazara ethnicity, was found dead with multiple gunshot wounds next to his car after an assailant shot him through a bush. On August 1, police responded to a drive-by shooting which killed Muhammad Afzaal Hussain, a Pakistani American who among other jobs "also worked on the campaign team for US Representative Melanie Stansbury of New Mexico." The last victim, Naeem Hussain, who was also Pakistani-American, was found dead on August 5 by Albuquerque police officers responding to reports of a shooting. This led the police to connect the three previous killings.

A 9mm Springfield Armory XD-M semi-automatic pistol, purchased by Syed on January 28, 2021, was determined to be the murder weapon.

== Perpetrator ==
On August 9, 2022, the Albuquerque Police Department announced that a "primary suspect" had been detained, later that day announcing the arrest of a 51-year-old Afghan American man named Muhammad Atif Syed, a well-known member of the local Muslim community. He was formally charged with the killings of Aftab Hussein and Muhammad Afzaal Hussian on August 10, and was charged with the killing of Naeem Hussain on August 19, and will be investigated for possible involvement in the killings of Mohammad Ahmadi. The police said in a statement that there was evidence that Syed knew the victims to some extent, and that the killings may have been motivated by "inter-personal conflict" as well as sectarian hate. Syed denied involvement in the killings.

Syed was working as a cook when he and his family fled Afghanistan in 2012 for Pakistan, where they lived until being admitted to the US as refugees in 2016. Although Syed claimed to have fought the Taliban as part of an elite Afghan National Army unit, his US government profile listed no military experience and an expert described his claim as "fishy". Beginning the year after he immigrated to the US, Syed was arrested for domestic violence three times, and one of his sons claimed Syed beat him and his mother repeatedly. All three cases were dismissed: the first two when Syed's alleged victims refused to press charges, and the third after he completed a pretrial intervention program. Syed was also arrested for failing to pull over for police; that charge, too, was dismissed.

In March 2024, Syed was convicted of the first-degree murder of Aftab Hussein. In New Mexico, a conviction of first-degree murder carries minimum sentence of 30 years to life, but, as of January 2025, the sentencing date has not been set. On September 3, 2024, Syed pleaded no contest to charges of second-degree murder for killing Muhammad and Naeem Hussain. Under the terms of his plea bargain, he will serve 30 years in prison for both charges, concurrent with any sentence he receives for first-degree murder conviction. On November 8, he was sentenced to life in prison with the possibility of parole after 30 years. His motive remains unknown.

=== Syed's son ===
On August 14, 2022, the U.S. Attorney for New Mexico stated that they were seeking to detain Muhammad Syed's son Shaheen "Maiwand" Syed in connection with up to two of the killings based on cell tower data, phone records, and the recovery of a pistol in the son's room, though the son's attorney called the allegations "exceedingly thin and speculative." Shaheen Syed has been arrested on August 9 on an unrelated federal charge of using an incorrect address while purchasing a firearm in 2021. He was eventually not charged with any murder and was held until being released to halfway house on October 7, 2022. Syed pleaded guilty on January 9, 2023, and served 70 days in prison. He is currently on three-year supervised release.

== Reactions ==
The belief that Islamophobia was behind the killings prompted Albuquerque's Muslim community to temporarily shutter businesses, and Muslim residents to either stay in their homes or move out of state. Reuters reported that the killings led to "days [of] bolstering security around Albuquerque-area mosques, seeking to allay fears of a shooter driven by anti-Muslim hate."

The Albuquerque Muslim community reacted with sadness following the arrest of Syed, who is a Muslim himself. Some residents expressed concern that Syed's arrest would fuel perceptions of Muslims as violent or extreme.

On August 10, the Islamic Center of Albuquerque held a community prayer for the men killed, while Sunni and Shia leaders came together in Washington, D.C. to send messages of solidarity. In an interview with Insider, a brother of one of the victims said he did not believe that the killings were religiously motivated.
