= The Hazaras =

Book by Hassan Poladi

The Hazāras
- Author: Hassan Poladi
- Language: English
- Subject: Hazara people; Afghanistan
- Genre: History
- Publisher: Mughal Publishing Company
- Publication date: February 1, 1989
- Publication place: Pakistan and United States
- Pages: 431
- ISBN: 978-0-929824-00-0

The Hazāras is a 1989 book on the history of the Hazara people by Hassan Poladi.

== Reception ==
In the Asia Society's newsletter Afghanistan Forum, Washington University in St. Louis scholar Robert L. Canfield wrote, "after extensive summaries of such diverse works he usually comes to defensible conclusions of his own, and, despite his evident apologetic purpose, he presents a reasonable and plausible image of the Hazara experience. Indeed, weaknesses aside, this book is a rich mine of information on the Hazaras, for Poladi's inclusion of everything that is known about them makes it an incomparable source on the subject".

Reinhard F. Hahn wrote in Central Asiatic Journal, "The Hazāras has more than its fair share of grammatical and orthographic errors, inconsistencies and inadequacies. ... Being an important addition to the hitherto all too meager store of publications about this interesting nation, The Hazāras definitely deserves the attention of those interested in any Central-Asia-related aspect of Afghan studies."

== See also ==
- The Hazara People and Greater Khorasan by Muhammad Taqi Khavari
- The Hazaras of Afghanistan by Syed Askar Mousavi
