= Ali Mohaqiq Nasab =

Personal life
- Born: Afghanistan

Religious life
- Religion: Islam

Ali Mohaqiq Nasab (Dari: آیت الله علی محقق نسب) is a liberal Afghan Shi'ite cleric and a former editor-in-chief of Huqūqi Zan (Women's Rights).

== Arrest and detention ==
On October 1, 2005, he was arrested on charges of publishing blasphemy. He reportedly challenged conservative Islamic beliefs in his magazine, and the articles for which he is charged are believed to have questioned the severity of punishments for adultery, theft and converting from Islam to another religion under Shariah law, and state that a woman's testimony is equal to that of a man, not half as much. The Media Commission met on 18 October 2005 to discuss Nasab's case, and concluded that he did not deliberately insult Islam in his articles and therefore that there was nothing to support the charge of blasphemy. However, he was convicted by a court in Kabul on 22 October and sentenced to two years in prison. After much pressure from a foreign delegation in Kabul, his sentence was reduced to six months and a half of it was suspended. Having already spent three months in detention, he was therefore released.

== See also ==
- Blasphemy law in Afghanistan
