= Hazaras in Europe =

Afghan minority

Total population
- 130,000 (2016)

Regions with significant populations
- Germany: 40,000 (2015)
- Austria: 22,000 (2016)

Languages
- Persian (Hazaragi and Dari); German; French; English; Swedish; Norwegian

Religion
- Islam

Related ethnic groups
- Hazara diaspora

Hazara in Europe (Dari: هزاره‌های اروپا) are people of Hazara descent living in Europe. Today more than one hundred thousand are residents of Europe. The vast majority form part of what is sometimes called the "Hazara diaspora".

== History ==
The Hazaras have encountered intense persecution for centuries. In the late 1800s, much of the Hazarajat, their mountainous homeland in central Afghanistan, was seized by Pashtun and other tribes. This, together with the more recent Soviet invasion in 1979 prompted mass exodus. A further wave fled the country as the largely ethnic Pashtun Taliban took control of the Hazarajat in 1998, massacring thousands of Hazaras.

== See also ==
- Hazara diaspora
- Hazara Australians
- Hazara Indonesians
