= Rahila Bibi Kobra Alamshahi =

Afghan politician

Rahila Bibi Kobra Alamshahi راحله بی‌بی کبرا علمشاهی

Personal details
- Born: Afghanistan
- Occupation: legislator

Rahila Bibi Kobra Alamshahi (Dari: راحله بی‌بی کبرا علمشاهی) is an Afghan politician who was elected to represent Ghazni Province in Afghanistan's Wolesi Jirga, the lower house of its National Legislature, in 2005. She is a member of the Hazara ethnic group. She is a teacher and journalist. She lived as a refugee in Iran for 28 years.

== See also ==
- List of Hazara people
