= Abdul Qayyum Sajjadi =

Hazara politician (born 1970)

Abdul Qayyum Sajjadi عبدالقیوم سجادی
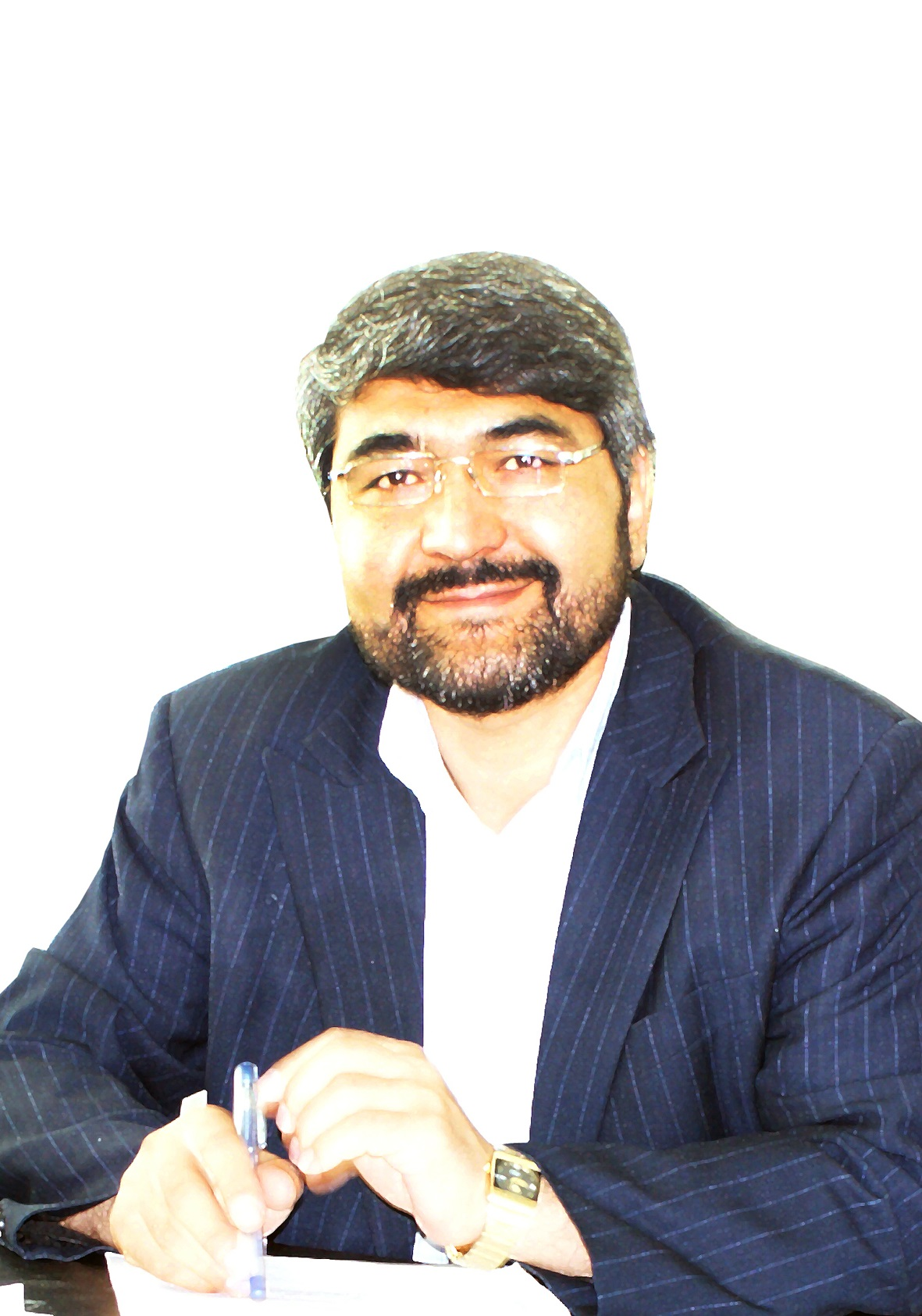
- Dr. Abdul Qayyum Sajjadi

Personal details
- Born: Abdul Qayyum; 1970 (age 55–56) Qarabagh district, Ghazni province
- Occupation: legislator, politician
- Ethnicity: Hazara

Abdul Qayyum Sajjadi (Dari: عبدالقیوم سجادی) is an Afghan politician who was elected to represent Ghazni province in Afghanistan's Parliament, the lower house of its National Legislature, in 2005.

== Early life ==
Abdul Qayyum Sajjadi son of Sayed Hakim, was born 1970 in Qarabagh district, Ghazni province. He is a member of the Hazara ethnic group. Sajjadi migrated to Iran after the Soviet invasion of Afghanistan. During the next 12 years, he studied Islamic studies and obtained a master's degree in political sociology and a doctorate in international relations from the University of Tehran. He taught in one of Iran's universities for five years and returned to the country after the fall of the Taliban. Sajjadi completed his secondary education in Iran. He has a bachelor's degree and a doctorate in law and political science with a specialization in international relations, as well as an equivalent doctorate degree in the field of Islamic studies, all of which he earned at university in Iran.

== See also ==
- List of Hazara people
