= Ahmad Behzad =

Hazara politician (born 1974)

Ahmad Behzad احمد بهزاد
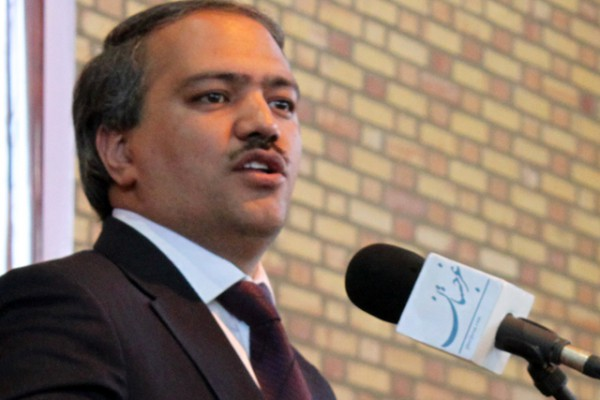

Member of Afghanistan Parliament
- Incumbent
- Assumed office 2010
- President: Ashraf Ghani
- Vice President: Afghan Parliament

Personal details
- Born: Ahmad Behzad; 1974 (age 51–52) Herat, Republic of Afghanistan
- Cabinet: Cabinet of Afghanistan
- Ethnicity: Hazara

Ahmad Behzad (Dari: احمد بهزاد) is an ethnic Hazara politician and former representative of the people of Herat province in the fifteenth and sixteenth parliamentary sessions of the Afghanistan Parliament.

== Early life ==
Ahmad Behzad was forced to leave Afghanistan and moved to Iran during the war with the Talibans. During his stay in Iran, he worked illegally and in bad conditions. When he returned to Afghanistan, he started to work as a journalist for Radio Azadi. Ahmad Behzad was instrumental in the progress of the Personal Status Law for Shi’ite Muslims in Afghanistan, the Media Code, and the Law for the Elimination of Violence Against Women.

Ahmad Behzad is pro US intervention in Afghanistan, and fears a civil war or the return of the Talibans if the US armed forces left the country. He however condemned the photos taken by US soldiers with dead Afghan bodies on the war field. He is proactive in promoting women's rights and standing up against conservative religious parties.

== See also ==
- List of Hazara people
