= Nikbakht Noruz =

Afghan female actor (born 2000)

Nikbakht Noruz نیکبخت نوروز
- Born: Nikbakht; 2000 (age 25–26); Bamyan, Islamic Emirate of Afghanistan
- Other names: Bakhtay بختی
- Occupations: Actress, currently student
- Years active: 2007
- Known for: Buddha Collapsed out of Shame
- Notable work: Buddha Collapsed out of Shame

Nikbakht Noruz (نیکبخت نوروز) is an Afghan female actress, who played the lead role of Bakhtay a six-year-old girl in a French, Iranian feature film Buddha Collapsed out of Shame (2007) directed by Hana Makhmalbaf set in Bamyan, Afghanistan

== See also ==
- Buddha Collapsed out of Shame
- Hana Makhmalbaf
