= Muhammad Yusuf Khan Hazara =

Afghan-Iranian politician

Muhammad Yusuf Khan Hazara محمد یوسف خان هزاره
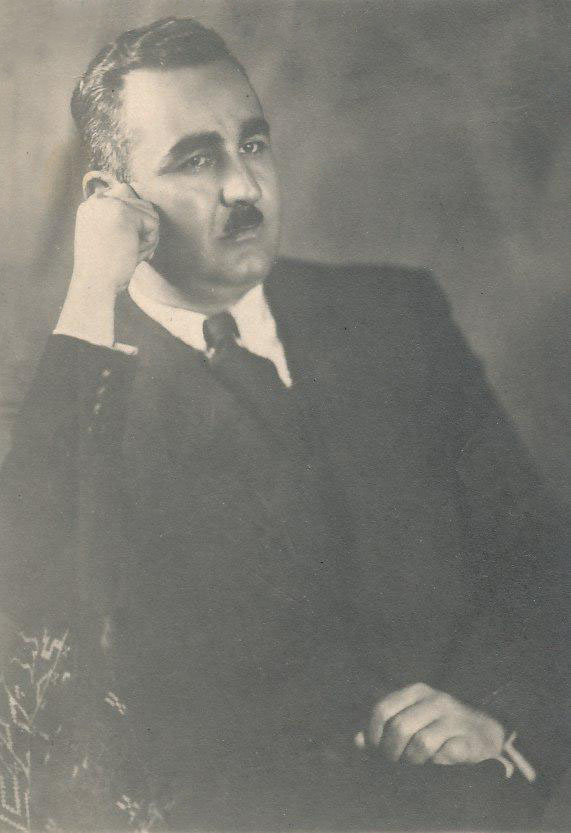

Member of the Iran Parliament for National Consultative Assembly
- In office February 1924 – February 1926

Personal details
- Born: 1891 Taybad, Iran
- Died: 1943 (aged 51–52) Taybad, Iran
- Cause of death: Gunfire

Muhammad Yusuf Khan Hazara (Persian: محمد یوسف خان هزاره) known as Sulat al-Sultanah Hazara (صولت‌السلطنه هزاره); (1891–1943) was an Afghan-Iranian politician and the first Sunni and Hazara representative member in the Iran parliament for National Consultative Assembly and he is the only sunni Iranian who has represented Mashhad in the history of Iran's legislatures.

Relying on the historical records of the Hazaras and exploiting the favorable context that the Pahlavi regime's actions had left, Sulat al-Sultanah was able to raise not only the nomads of the east, north and west of Khorasan but also many other strata of the people and rule over a large part of Khorasan in a short period from the winter of 1941.

== Early life and story ==
Sulat al-Sultanah Hazara was born in 1891 in Taybad, Iran. In 1943, he was assassinated by gunfire in a mission in Taybad, Iran. He was from a Sunni Hazara family. The Hazaras are an ethnic group native to the Hazarajat region of central Afghanistan. Before Iran was forced to relinquish Herat according to the Treaty of Paris in 1857 during the reign of Naser al-Din Shah, the country was in possession of a much greater part of Greater Khorasan. One of the tribes that roamed in this part prior to cession, were the Hazaras. The tribe settled on both sides of the border after the border between Iran and Afghanistan was drawn. The leadership of this tribe at the end of the Qajar period and also the Pahlavi period was with Sulat al-Sultanah Hazara.

=== Khorasan Revolt ===
Reza Shah summoned Sulat al-Sultanah from Mashhad and imprisoned him in Tehran following a policy of settlement and repression of nomads to be comfortable with Hazaras. After about two years, in 1935, he was deported to Fars with his family and was given land in Yazd and Firuzabad, instead of Khorasan properties. Despite the difficult conditions, Hazaras had extensive construction and agricultural efforts in Fars, which also produced significant results. However, following the events of September 1941 and the return of the Qashqai khans to Fars, who were the main owners of properties assigned to the Hazaras and the cessation of the proceeds of these properties, the situation changed.

He returned to Tehran after the Allies occupied Iran and Reza Shah was forced to abdicate. After his efforts to reclaim properties in Tehran did not side and even received death threats, he went to Khorasan and communicated with many heads of local tribes and readers in Mashhad and asked them for help in gaining lost power. In this way, with the help of his brother, "Mantesur al-Mulk", he started a rebellion that was the starting point in the border town of Taybad.

The Sulat al-Sultanah rebellion began in January 1942. His forces were sent from Taybad to Mashhad, and later the rebel forces occupied Bakharz and Fariman and were determined to capture the city of Mashhad. This was while Sulat al-Sultanah was still in Mashhad and led the rebellion from the city. He stated Mashhad after his forces seized the city of Fariman. In part, it stated:

We say loudly that we are against any kind of dictatorial regime, even though it prevails in every country. We are not willing to go under any kind of government except a democratic government, and we ask other dear compatriots to cooperate with us to save the country from oppression.

— Sulat al-Sultanah Hazara, Text of the Mashhad Declaration

== See also ==
- List of Hazara people
