= Buddha Collapsed Out of Shame =

- Persian: بودا از شرم فرو ریخت
- Directed by: Hana Makhmalbaf
- Written by: Marzieh Makhmalbaf
- Produced by: Maysam Makhmalbaf
- Starring: Abbas Alijome; Abdolali Hoseinali; Nikbakht Noruz
- Cinematography: Ostad Ali
- Edited by: Mastaneh Mohajer
- Music by: Tolibhon Shakhidi
- Release date: 9 September 2007 (Toronto International Film Festival)
- Country: Iran
- Language: Persian

Buddha Collapsed Out of Shame (Persian: بودا از شرم فرو ریخت, romanized: Buda az sharm foru rikht) is a 2007 Iranian film directed by Hana Makhmalbaf. The title is taken from her father Mohsen Makhmalbaf's book The Buddha Was Not Demolished in Afghanistan, It Collapsed Out of Shame. The story takes place in modern Afghanistan following the removal of the Taliban and revolves around a 5-year-old Afghan girl who wants to attend a newly opened school. The girl Bakhtay (Nikbakht Noruz) lives in the caves under the remains of the Buddhas of Bamiyan which were destroyed by the Taliban in 2001. Bakhtay becomes obsessed with the idea of going to school but must fight against a society influenced by conditions suffered during the strict Taliban rule including male domination, war, poverty, violence and dire children's games.

Cast
| Talib boy | Abdolali Hoseinali |
| Abbas | Abbas Alijome |
| Bakhtay | Nikbakht Noruz |
