= Basir Ahang =

Hazara journalist and human rights activist

Basir Ahang بصیر آهنگ
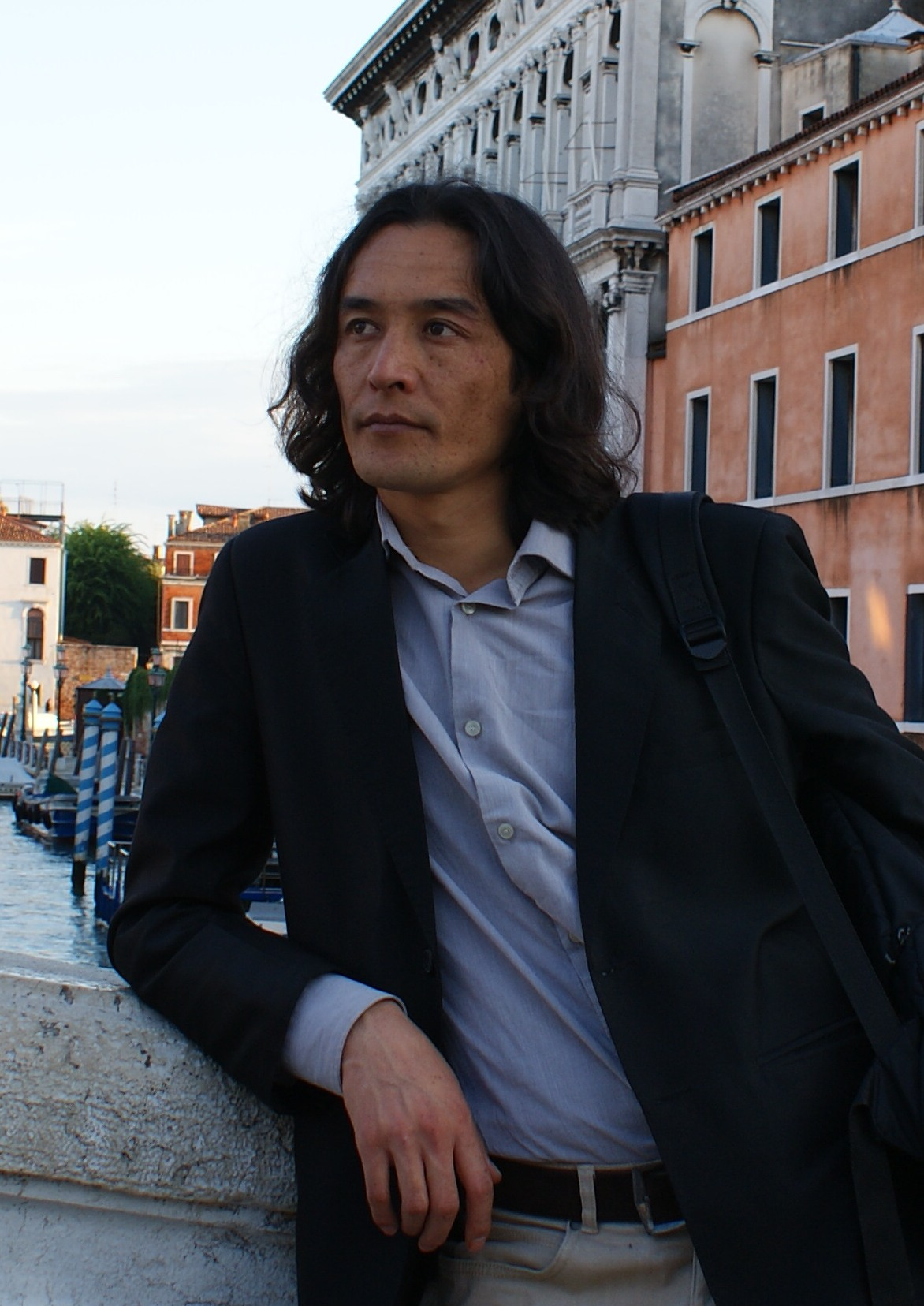
- Born: 1984 (age 40–41)
- Citizenship: Italian
- Education: Kabul University; Padua University
- Occupation(s): Poet, journalist and human rights activist
- Years active: 2007- Present

Basir Ahang (Dari: بصیر آهنگ) is a Hazara poet, journalist and human rights activist from Afghanistan. He obtained political refugee status in Italy and lives in the United Kingdom.

== Biography ==
An ethnic Hazara, Ahang received his diploma from Mir Adina High School in Malistan-Ghazni, and received his bachelor's degree in Persian Literature from Kabul University in 2007. While studying at Kabul University, Ahang has been collaborating with different national and international media.

== Fleeing Afghanistan ==
After receiving security alerts for his activities in Afghanistan, Basir Ahang moved to Italy In 2008 where he continued his studies in International Relations at Padua University. In 2009, after being informed about the condition of the Afghanistan asylum seekers in Greece, he went to Patras city with a team of MSF (doctors without borders) and Italian advocates and journalists. His first reports in Persian published in Kabul Press, and in Italian on Italian news websites, shocked everyone, as no one had such first-person detailed reports from refugees and asylum seekers in Greece that far. Basir Ahang is a member of the International Federation of Journalists since January 2009.

On March 31, 2009, the Italian parliament showed a reaction to one of his reports on the misbehavior of Italian police with a minor named Ali Dad who was thirteen. The parliament asked the authorities to pursue the case. Basir Ahang made a documentary about the refugees and asylum seekers in Greece and after a part of this documentary was broadcast on Rai,"1" Italy's public television, it caught the attention of journalists and human rights organizations and they were pushed to go to Greece to be able to see the condition of refugees and the violation of their rights and report on it. After these events in May 2009, some lawyers and human rights activists filed a complaint in the European Human Rights Court in Strasbourg France, against the Italian and the Greek governments for their misbehavior and violation of refugees' rights in these two countries.

In the summer of 2021, his family successfully fled Afghanistan and joined Ahang in Italy.

== Writing and journalistic activities ==
Ahang has written hundreds of reports on refugees and their legal rights, women rights, freedom of speech and human rights violation in Afghanistan.

Ahan publishes in Persian, Italian and English. In 2013 the Aljazeera website has named him the Expert on refugees' issues. Basir Ahang has participated in several conferences on refugees, women's rights, and Afghanistan crisis.

Throughout the 2021 withdrawal of NATO troops from Afrangistan, Ahang was interviewed by global media organizations to provide context on the situation.

== See also ==
- List of Hazara people
