= Meena Hazara =

Bangladeshi karateka

Meena Hazara مینا هزاره
- Born: Zohra Meena; Quetta, Pakistan
- Nationality: Pakistani
- Style: Karate
- Last updated on: April 23, 2012

Meena Hazara (Hazaragi: مینا هزاره) is a gold medalist who participated in the 2010 South Asian Games in Dhaka, Bangladesh. She represented Pakistan in Karate.

== See also ==
- List of Hazara people
- Fariba Rezayee
- Abrar Hussain
