= Murder of Ruqia Haidari =

2019 forced marriage and 2020 murder in Australia

Ruqia Haidari (1999–2020) was a 21-year-old Afghan Australian woman who was murdered by her husband, Mohammad Ali Halimi, on 18 January 2020, six weeks after they married. Halimi was subsequently sentenced to life imprisonment in 2021 for Haidari's murder. In 2024, Haidari's mother, Sakina Muhammad Jan, became the first person in Australia to be jailed under the country's forced marriage laws after being found guilty of pressuring her daughter into marrying Halimi after Haidari's first marriage, also forced, ended in divorce.

== Background ==
Haidari was born in 1999 in Afghanistan, to Hazara parents; her father, a fruit and vegetable salesman, was murdered by the Taliban when she was a month old. Haidari was the youngest of five children. In 2013, following increasing persecution of Hazaras in Afghanistan, Haidari's mother, Sakina Muhammad Jan, fled with Haidari and her siblings first to Pakistan and subsequently to Australia as refugees. The family settled in Shepparton, a city in Victoria with an established Hazara population. The family were Dari-speaking; while Jan did not learn English, Haidari and her siblings picked up the language at school, and became exposed to people and ideas from outside of the Hazara community. Haidari graduated from McGuire College in Shepparton.

Jan had been subject to a forced marriage when she was 12 or 13, and had her first child a year later. All of Jan's older children had arranged marriages, which were common occurrences in Hazara communities where men and women were often separated, limiting opportunities to meet. When Haidari turned 15, she herself had an arranged marriage; the marriage, which was religious and never officially registered, ended with divorce when Jan was either 17 or 20. Following the divorce, Haidari was reported to have said that she did not wish to remarry until she was "27 or 28", after she had completed her studies and started work.

In Australia, forced marriage laws were first introduced in 2013, carrying a maximum penalty of seven years' imprisonment, or eight if the victim is under 18. The Australian Government officially recognises forced marriage as a form of modern slavery under its criminal code.

== Murder ==
On 1 June 2019, Haidari met Halimi at a family gathering in Shepparton. Halimi, who was 25, lived in Balcatta, a suburb of Perth, Western Australia. He was the brother of the former neighbour of an acquaintance of Jan, who had also fled Afghanistan, arriving in Australia as a refugee at the age of 17. Following their meeting, Haidari told multiple people, including a friend, a driving instructor, and a teacher, that she did not wish to marry Halimi. She met with officers from the Australian Federal Police on 19 August and informed them that she was being married against her will; however, she did not agree to progress the matter and declined offers from the police to speak to her family or to move into a refuge, and the police decided to take no further action. The following day, Haidari and Halimi became engaged.

Haidari and Halimi were married in November 2019 following an Islamic marriage ceremony in Melbourne, after he paid a dowry of 14, 000 AUD; she subsequently moved with him into his home in Balcatta. The marriage was described as "violent and abusive"; Haidari refused to consummate the marriage, and he forced her to complete household chores. On a visit to see family in Shepparton, Haidari reportedly begged them not to let her return to Perth. On 17 January 2018, Halimi sent a video to Haidari's family, in which he complained that she slept until late, and did not cook or clean. It was reported that in the days before her murder, Halimi became aware that Haidari had previously asked a police officer whether forced marriage was legal in Australia.

On 18 January 2020, Halimi stabbed Haidari twice in the neck with a kitchen knife during an argument at their home, severing two arteries; following this, he messaged her brother asking him to collect Haidari's "dead body", before driving to a police station in Mirrabooka and confessing to her murder. Officers subsequently found Haidari at their home, where she was declared deceased.

== Legal proceedings ==
=== 2021 trial of Halimi ===
The trial into Haidari's murder commenced in 2021 at the Supreme Court of Western Australia. While in prison, Halimi wrote a letter stating that he had been unaware that Haidari had been forced into the marriage, and stated had he known this he would have permitted her to get a divorce; this contradicted an interview he gave to police the day after the murder, in which he stated that Haidari had told him following their wedding that she had been forced to marry him and that she did not love him. His lawyer argued that Haidari had a "complete loss of self-control" when he stabbed Haidari, stemming from his traumatic upbringing in Afghanistan. The judge, Bruno Fiannaca, stated that it was "nonsense" that Halimi was not aware until after her death that Haidari had not wanted to marry him, ruling that he was motivated by Haidari being "hostile and disrespectful" towards him. In August 2021, Halimi was sentenced to life imprisonment, with a minimum term of 19 years.

=== 2024 trial of Jan ===
In October 2020, Jan, alongside two others, were arrested by the Australian Federal Police on charges of coercing Haidari into a forced marriage, before being bailed pending trial. Jan's trial took place in 2024 at the Victorian County Court in Melbourne. Jan pleaded not guilty to orchestrating a forced marriage, stating that she felt "enduring grief" for her daughter's death and that she was unaware that Haidari had not wished to remarry. Jan's lawyer described her as being illiterate and unable to speak English, as well as a victim of a forced marriage during her own youth, stating that she was "perhaps only doing what she knew". The prosecution alleged that Jan had been motivated by a desire to restore her family's reputation following Haidari's divorce, which he led to her being seen as "bewa", a term referring to a loss of value, in the Hazara community. They provided evidence that Haidari had told multiple individuals, including Jan, a friend, a driving instructor, a teacher and a police officer that she had not wanted to marry Halimi, and that she had told a friend she wanted to "marry for love". They argued that Jan had shown no remorse or insight into her actions, and that she should be jailed to deter others from committing forced marriages.

In July 2024, Jan was sentenced to three years' imprisonment for the "intolerable pressure" she had put Haidari under to remarry, though it was recognised that she could not have foreseen that Halimi would murder Haidari. Jan could have been released after one year to serve the rest of her sentence in the community on good behaviour. She served her sentence at a prison in Melbourne.

In March 2025, Jan lost an appeal against her sentence.
