= Hussain Sadiqi =

Afghan actor

- حسین صادقی
- Born: 1981 (age 44–45); Urozgan (Daykundi), Democratic Republic of Afghanistan
- Occupations: Actor, martial artist

Hussain Sadiqi (Dari: حسین صادقی) (born 1981) is a Hazara Australian actor and martial artist. He won an award for the best fight scene for the Australian made action movie Among Dead Men at International Film Festival in Pasadena, California. An athlete in Afghanistan, Sadiqi left as the Taliban arrived and landed in Australia as a refugee in 1999 at Port Hedland Detention Centre.

== Early life ==
Sadiqi was born in 1981 in the central highlands of Afghanistan in Urozgan (Daykundi). He began his martial arts training when he was 9 years old and soon mastered shaolin, the Chinese kungfu. He attained the top-ranking Martial Arts position in Afghanistan at a young age and became the National Champion at the age of 16. At 18 he became the captain of the Afghanistan National Team.

In 1999 he had to flee Afghanistan because of war. He had become a Taliban target due to his high profile. Taliban started violent persecution of Hazara people. Soon after arriving in Australia, he was sent to the now closed Port Hedland Detention Center for six months until he was released on a temporary protection visa.

== Career ==
After being released he was selected to compete for the Afghan Taekwondo team at the 2000 Sydney Olympic Games and carry his country's flag at the Opening Ceremony. A couple of days before the Games started the International Olympic Committee banned the Afghan team because the Taliban, which controlled Afghanistan at the time, would not allow women to compete. This meant he could not compete in the games. In 2004, Athens Olympic participation was ruled out because he was on temporary Protection Visa and could not get sponsors for his pre-Olympic training in China.

== Documentary ==
Hussain gained many fans with his martial arts-based documentary "The Art of Fighting".

In 2008 he won an award for the best fight scene in an action movie for "Among the Dead Men" at the Action on Film International Film Festival in Pasadena, California. The award was for the best action in a Feature Film.

In 2012 Hussain came back to win the Kung Fu World Championship at the age of 33.

== Circus performer ==
In November 2006, he made his debut as a circus performer in the National Institute of Circus Arts' production DiVino, and also became an Australian citizen on in November.

== See also ==
- Hazara Australians
- Afghan Australians
- List of Hazara people
