= Ahmad Shah Ramazan =

Hazara politician from Afghanistan

Ahmad Shah Ramazan احمدشاه رمضان
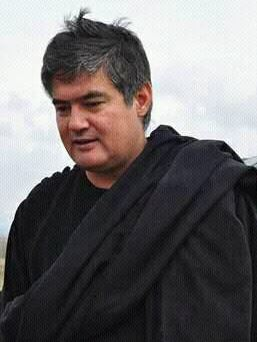
- Ahmad Shah Ramazan

National Assembly of Afghanistan

Personal details
- Born: Ahmad Shah; 1969 (age 56–57) Balkh province, Afghanistan
- Occupation: Politician
- Ethnicity: Hazara

Ahmad Shah Ramazan (Dari: احمدشاه رمضان) is an ethnic Hazara politician from Afghanistan. He is the former representative of the people of Balkh Province during the sixteenth parliamentary term of Afghanistan Parliament who elected in 2010.

== Early life ==
Ahmad Shah Ramazan, son of Ramazan, was born in 1969 in Balkh province of Afghanistan in a family of the Hazara ethnic group. He completed his schooling in the Balkh Province and earned his bachelor's degree in Engineering from Tashkent University of Uzbekistan. after graduation he has had more business activities.

Ramazan is fluent in Dari-Persian, Russian, Uzbek, and a little Pashto and English.

== See also ==
- List of Hazara people
