= Hana Makhmalbaf =

Iranian filmmaker (born 1988)

- حنا مخملباف
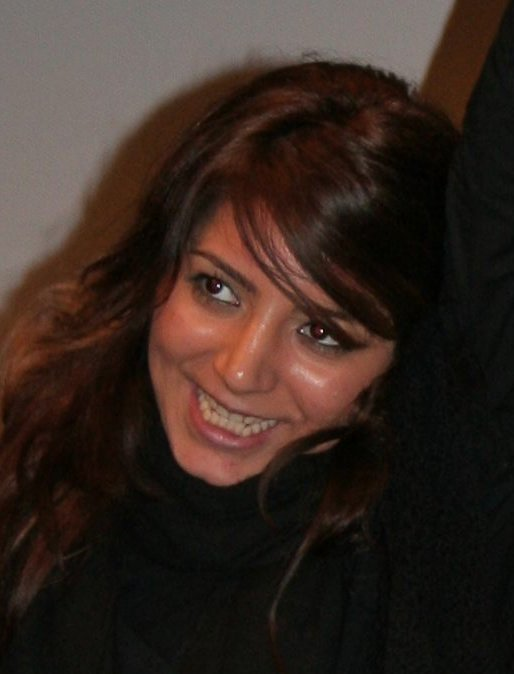
- Hana Makhmalbaf receiving the Cyclo d'Or at the Vesoul International Film Festival of Asian Cinema in 2009
- Born: September 3, 1988 (age 37); Tehran
- Occupation: Filmmaker
- Spouse: Hani Washian
- Children: Nickan Washian
- Parent(s): Mohsen Makhmalbaf (father); Marzieh Meshkini (mother)
- Relatives: Samira Makhmalbaf (sister); Meysam Makhmalbaf (brother)

Hana Makhmalbaf (Persian: حنا مخملباف,; born September 3, 1988) is an Iranian filmmaker. She is the younger sister of filmmaker Samira Makhmalbaf and daughter of filmmakers Mohsen Makhmalbaf and Fatemeh Meshkini. She is known for her films Joy of Madness (2003), Buddha Collapsed Out of Shame (2007) and Green Days (2009). Makhmalbaf won the Lina Mangiacapre Award at the Venice Film Festival in 2003 for Joy of Madness (2003), which also won the Special Jury Prize at Tokyo Filmex. Makhmalbaf's film Buddha Collapsed Out of Shame won various awards as well, such as the Paolo Ungari UNICEF Prize at the Rome Film Festival and the Peace Film Award at the Berlin International Film Festival.

== Early life and education ==
Makhmalbaf's film involvement began early in her life. By age three, she had already attended the Cannes Film Festival. Her own work gained attention by age eight when the Locarno Film Festival screened her first short film titled The Day My Aunt Was Ill.

Makhmalbaf expressed interest in being a painter, but did not like the "loneliness" that she described in the art form. She then was drawn to filmmaking, and she found the on-set experience compelling. In an interview, Makhmalbaf explained that hearing the words "lights, camera, action" was exciting and had a "strange power".

At the age of eight, Makhmalbaf decided she did not want to continue attending school. She then switched to her father's film academy and studio, Makhmalbaf Film House, in her hometown of Tehran. In the Makhmalbaf Film House, the students learned about many art forms such as painting, photography and cinema. Makhmalbaf had to keep up with what her peers were learning in addition to studying at the film academy. Makhmalbaf began to miss her previous schooling and went back for a few weeks. However, she quickly realized she would rather be the Makhmabaf Film House after experiencing the formal education system again.

== Career ==
Makhmalbaf's debut documentary was released in 2003 and was entitled Joy of Madness. The film was about the making of her sister Samira's film At Five in the Afternoon. Makhmalbaf was able to take advantage of being only 13 to amass much candid digital footage when Samira was trying to persuade Afghan people to take part in her film. She was described as being able to blend in and remain overlooked as she shot her film among the production. She was able to capture so much on film because her age caused people not to hide from her since they did not take her seriously.

When Joy of Madness(2003) premiered at the Venice Film Festival, Makhmalbaf was too young to attend her own screening under Italian law. Joy of Madness was also screened at the Cannes Film Festival, where Makhmalbaf beat the record of the youngest person to have a film screened in the festival. The record was previously held by her sister, Samira Makhmalbaf, who had broken the record at the age of seventeen.

Joy of Madness was also screened at the London International Film Festival in November 2004. Makhmalbaf and her sister, Samira, were both in attendance at the festival as Samira's film At Five in the Afternoon was also screened at the festival.

Her first feature film, Buddha Collapsed out of Shame, won an award at Festival du nouveau cinéma in Montreal, Quebec, Canada in 2007, as well as two awards from San Sebastian International Film Festival, in Spain, and the Crystal Bear for the Best Feature Film by the Generation Kplus Children's Jury at the Berlinale Film Festival in 2008.

Her second feature, Green Days premiered at the 2009 Toronto International Film Festival. The film was a documentary about the run-up to the 2009 Presidential Election in Iran. Makhmalbaf made use of footage from protesters by inter-cutting scenes of the post-election violence garnered from cell-phone and other amateur videos circulating anonymously. Green Days also screened at the Venice Film Festival. Makhmalbaf and her family left Iran shortly after the film's premiere.

After Green Days, Makhmalbaf went on to work on her father's film, The President. In 2015, Makhmalbaf announced her next film, entitled Single Mother. Many of Malkhmalbaf's family members worked on the film, with her father, Mohsen Malkhmalbaf, writing the script, and her brother, Maysam Malkhmalbaf, producing it. Malhmalbaf and her family spent time in Italy when working on the script.

== Filmography ==
Year	Film
2003	Joy of Madness
2007	Buddha Collapsed out of Shame
2009	Green Days
2023	The List

== Awards and nominations ==
Year	Award	Film Festival	Film	
2003	Lina Mangiacapre Award - Special Mention	Venice Film Festival	Joy of Madness	Won
2003	Grand Prize	Tokyo FILMeX	Joy of Madness	Nominated
2003	Special Jury Prize	Tokyo FILMeX	Joy of Madness	Won
2007	Grand Prize	Tokyo FILMeX	Buddha Collapsed Out Of Shame	Nominated
2007	TVE Orta Mirada Award	San Sebastian International Film Festival	Buddha Collapsed Out Of Shame	Won
2007	Special Prize of the Jury	San Sebastian International Film Festival	Buddha Collapsed Out Of Shame	Won
2007	Paolo Ungari UNICEF Prize	Rome Film Fest	Buddha Collapsed Out Of Shame	Won
2008	Woosuk Award	Jeonju Film Festival	Buddha Collapsed Out Of Shame	Nominated
2008	Peace Film Award	Berlin International Film Festival	Buddha Collapsed Out Of Shame	Won
2008	Crystal Bear	Berlin International Film Festival	Buddha Collapsed Out Of Shame	Won
2008	FIPRESCI Prize	Ankara Flying Broom International Women's Film Festival	Buddha Collapsed Out Of Shame	Won
2009	Grand Prize	Tokyo FILMex	Green Days	Nominated
2009	Open Eyes Jury Award	Nuremberg International Human Rights Film Festival	Buddha Collapsed Out Of Shame	Nominated
2009	Nuremberg International Human Rights Film Award	Nuremberg International Human Rights Film Festival	Buddha Collapsed Out Of Shame	Nominated
