= Barat Ali Batoor =

Hazara photographer (born 1983)

- Born: Barat Ali; 1983; Hazaristan
- Other name: Batoor
- Occupation: Photographer
- Years active: 2002–present
- Website: www.batoor.com/bio.html

Barat Ali Batoor (Dari: برات‌علی باتور) is a professional freelancer photographer from Afghanistan. He started his professional career in 2002, and is a double Walkley-Award-winning photojournalist and reporter.

== Early life ==
Barat Ali Batoor was born in 1983 in a Hazara family.

== Career ==
After publishing a piece in the Washington Post exposing the trade of underage prostitution in his homeland of Afghanistan, Batoor became the target of death threats and was forced to flee his country.

He took part in the documentary photography project funded by the Open Society Institute. A photograph titled 'The First Day at Sea' he took of a boat journey to Australia won the prestigious 2013 Nikon-Walkley Photo of the Year.

== Exhibitions ==
- June to October 2024: "Searching For Sanctuary: A Journey of Survival " - State Library Victoria, Melbourne; presented as part of the RISING: festival.

== See also ==
- List of Hazara people
