= Abbas Ibrahim Zada =

Afghan politician and businessman (born 1970)

- عباس ابراهیم‌زاده

National Assembly (Afghanistan)

Personal details
- Born: Abbas Ibrahim Zada; 1970 (age 55–56) Balkh Province, Afghanistan
- Occupation: Politician
- Ethnicity: Hazara

Abbas Ibrahim Zada (Dari: عباس ابراهیم‌زاده; born 1970) is a politician and businessman from Afghanistan. He is the former representative of the people of Balkh during the 16th parliamentary term of Afghanistan Parliament.

== Early life ==
Abbas Ibrahim Zada was born in 1970 in Sholgara district of Balkh province. He graduated from the Bakhtar High School in Mazar-e Sharif with a 12th-grade degree.

== Career ==
Locally, he is known as "Abbas Dollar," as he is one of Afghanistan's richest men and is heavily involved in the oil and gas business. In September 2025, he was arrested following multiple-business related complaints in Tashkent, Uzbekistan, where he had been investing more than $50 million since 2024 in sectors including commercial transport and flour production.

== See also ==
- List of Hazara people
