= Najaf Mazari =

Afghan-Australian author and rugmaker (born 1974)

- Born: July 2, 1971 (age 55); Sharshar, Republic of Afghanistan
- Occupation: Rug-maker

Najaf Mazari (born 2 July 1971) is a Hazara Afghan-Australian rugmaker, and author of the autobiography The Rug-maker of Mazar-E-Sharif, detailing his escape from Afghanistan and his settlement in Australia.

== Early years ==
Mazari was born in Sharshar, a village in Northern Afghanistan, near the Hindu Kush mountains. He was born into a Hazara family, and was initially a shepherd, before moving to Mazar-i-Sharif at the age of 12 to learn rug-making under a master rug-maker. He learnt the trade, and became a master himself, although he faced persecution due to being Hazara. After the Taliban took control of Afghanistan in 1996, the Hazara population of Mazar-i-Sharif were expelled, and two of his brothers were killed. He was beaten and tortured before going into hiding.

== Asylum in Australia ==
After he was injured due to a rocket attack, he made the choice to leave Afghanistan for his own safety in 2001, leaving behind his wife and daughter. Traveling via Pakistan and Indonesia, he managed to board a boat with 95 other people to seek Asylum in Australia as a refugee. He was initially detained at Woomera Detention Center in central South Australia. He was then granted a Temporary protection visa, settling in Melbourne.

== Life in Australia ==
Mazari managed to find work in a carpet factory in Melbourne, after showing the skills he had learnt in Afghanistan. Before opening his own Rug business in Prahran, selling his own rugs and those from Afghanistan. In 2006, his wife Hakima and daughter Maria joined him in Australia.

In 2008, with the help of author Robert Hillman, he wrote an account of his life titled The Rug-Maker of Mazar-E-Sharif, profits from the book helping to buy an ambulance for his village.

In 2011, he again collobarated with Hillman, writing The Honey Thief, a collection of short stories about the Hazara people.

== Bibliography ==
- The Rugmaker of Mazar-E-Sharif (2008)
- The Honey Thief (2011)
