= Mir Yazdanbakhsh =

Hazara chief of Behsud (died 1832)

Mir Yazdanbakhsh میر یزدان‌بخش
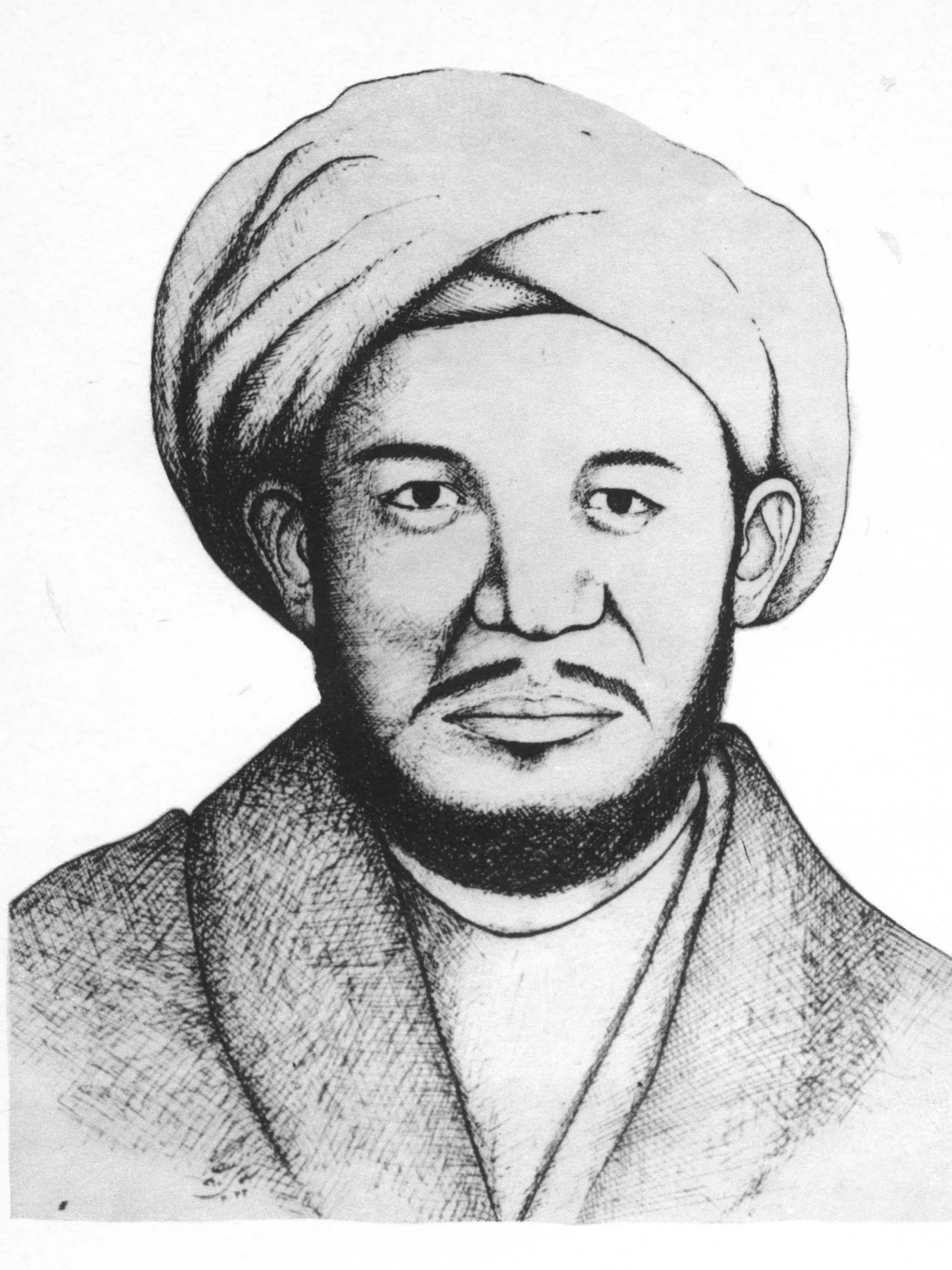
- Born: 1790 (Note: Charles Masson, who met him in 1832, describes him as "a man of about forty years of age". Ludwig Adamec based his birth year on this estimate.); Behsud, Durrani Empire
- Died: December 2, 1832; Bamiyan, Emirate of Kabul
- Cause of death: Execution by strangling
- Resting place: Kharzar
- Occupation: Chief (mir) of Behsud
- Title: Mir
- Predecessor: Mir Muhammad Shah (elder brother)
- Spouse: A daughter of a Dai Zangi chief
- Parent: Mir Wali Beg
- Relatives: Mir Muhammad Shah (brother); Mir Abbas (brother)

Mir Yazdanbakhsh (Dari: میر یزدان‌بخش; died 2 December 1832) was a chief of the Behsud Hazaras in the Hazarajat of central Afghanistan. From the 1820s he was the most powerful figure in Behsud and controlled the main approaches to Bamiyan. He was seized by Haji Khan Kakar, the governor of Bamiyan under Dost Mohammad Khan, and executed in December 1832. The most detailed account of his life comes from the British traveller Charles Masson, who accompanied Haji Khan's expedition of 1832 and witnessed his arrest.

== Origins and rise ==
Yazdanbakhsh was a younger son of Mir Wali Beg of Kharzar ("Karzar" in the English sources), who had been the superior chief of Behsud some twenty or twenty-five years before 1832. Kharzar is a village in the Siyahsang valley, about 120 kilometres from Kabul and 70 kilometres from Bamiyan, near the Hajigak pass. Mir Wali Beg was killed by a lesser chief, Wakil Saifullah, at Siyahsang ("black rock"), in the valley leading from Kharzar to the Helmand. He had twelve sons. The eldest, Mir Muhammad Shah, succeeded him as Mir of Behsud.

Yazdanbakhsh raised troops, captured Wakil Saifullah and killed him on the spot where his father had died. He then drove his eldest brother, Mir Muhammad Shah, to Kabul and took the title of Mir. Another brother, Mir Abbas, twice contested his position; each time he was defeated and reconciled with Yazdanbakhsh, and afterwards remained loyal. Mohan Lal also records that Yazdanbakhsh became "the principal chief or Mir of Behsud".

Yazdanbakhsh subdued the lesser chiefs of Behsud and, according to Masson, "established a more decisive authority than any former mir had enjoyed". The high road between Kabul and Bamiyan ran through his territory and had been exposed to raids by the Shaikh Ali Hazaras and robbery by the people of Behsud. Under his rule it became safe for single travellers and caravans, and merchants spread his fame. Nayel writes that he held parts of Behsud on both the southern and northern slopes of the Koh-i-Baba, together with Hissa-i Awwal, Siyahsang, Kalu and Bamiyan. Behsud lay on the trade route to Bamiyan, close to Kabul. It was the only part of the Hazarajat exposed to regular government interference during Dost Mohammad Khan's first reign. Yazdanbakhsh controlled the main approaches to Bamiyan through the Iraq and Hajigak passes.

He was linked by marriage alliances to the chiefs of the Shaikh Ali and Dai Zangi Hazaras. Some of the Shaikh Ali chiefs were hostile to him, and he led a campaign against them and against several small tribes near Ghorband. The Qizilbash of Kabul had bought castles and land in Behsud as a refuge from sectarian conflict in the city, and acted as mediators between its mirs and the Kabul government. Yazdanbakhsh allowed no rival influence in Behsud. He confiscated the estates of some Kabul Shi'as who had supported his opponents, but good relations and marriage alliances between the leading families continued. Nayel writes that Javanshirs and other residents of Kabul's Chindawol quarter bought houses and land in the Mir's territory, as a refuge for dangerous times.

The registered tribute of Behsud was 40,000 rupees. Under the Sadozai kings Behsud had yielded 17,000 rupees in kind. In the 1820s Amir Muhammad Khan, the governor of Ghazni, raised its revenue to 40,000 rupees.

At Kharzar, opposite his father's castle across the stream, Yazdanbakhsh began a new castle. It was rectangular, with walls planned to reach about fifty feet (25 pakhsas) in height and twenty-two feet in thickness, but only about twenty-eight feet had been built by 1832. Its entrance was defended by towers in the Kandahar style, its walls were pierced with loopholes for matchlocks, and he stored large quantities of lead and powder in it. The castle commanded the high road, which ran directly beneath its walls.

== Appearance and character ==
Masson was Yazdanbakhsh's guest in 1832 and met him several times. He describes Yazdanbakhsh in 1832 as about forty years old, tall and athletic, with a remarkably long neck, a ruddy complexion, and prominent but pleasing features of "the genuine Hazara cast". He had scarcely any beard. In company he constantly passed his prayer beads between his fingers, murmuring to himself with his eyes raised. He usually went bareheaded, saying that his head was hot and could bear no pressure. On the march he wore only a simple cap, and a turban of white muslin on special occasions. His dress was plain: a vest of Dai Zangi barrak with two stripes of gold lace down the front, and a sash holding a Hazara knife. He seldom spoke unless addressed, and his answers were brief. Masson concluded that he was "an extraordinary man, which he undoubtedly was".

== Imprisonment in Kabul ==
Dost Mohammad Khan feared Yazdanbakhsh's growing influence, and particularly the prospect of the Kabul Shi'as, who had helped him to power, joining forces with the Mir. Using the offices of the Qizilbash of Kabul, he persuaded the Mir to visit Kabul and imprisoned him. The invitation came with a Qur'an sealed by the amir as a pledge of the Mir's safety, and the leading Shi'as of Kabul acted as guarantors. One of his wives, a daughter of a Dai Zangi chief, warned him not to go. Masson describes her as a woman of "masculine understanding and habits" who rode armed, in men's clothes, beside her husband on his campaigns and advised him in council. When he decided to go, she went with him.

Both were seized soon after their arrival in Kabul. Yazdanbakhsh saved his life by offering to pay 50,000 rupees, with the Javanshirs of Kabul standing as guarantors. Mohan Lal gives the sum offered as 100,000 rupees. While the arrangements were being made, the Mir escaped and reached Behsud. Dost Mohammad then had his wife brought before him and reviled her. According to Masson, she answered: "Oh, son of Pahinda Khan, art thou not ashamed to array thyself against a female?" Masson calls her "the Hazara Amazon". She was placed in the custody of the Qizilbash in the Chindawol quarter, and escaped from there on horseback, armed and disguised as a man. A party of horsemen overtook her in the valley of Unai. She held them off with her matchlock, advancing and halting by turns, until she reached the Unai Pass, which was Hazara territory, and they gave up the pursuit. She rejoined her husband at Kharzar. She died before Masson wrote his account.

Despite this treatment, Yazdanbakhsh continued to pay revenue to Kabul and let caravans bound for Turkistan use the Hajigak route. He no longer helped Amir Muhammad Khan, who collected the tribute each year, with the rest of the collection. He paid his own share promptly, but joined the Afghan camp only late in the season and with a force strong enough to deter treachery.

== Conflict with Haji Khan Kakar ==
Haji Khan Kakar, whose name was Taj Muhammad Khan, was a Pashtun soldier of fortune who had twice saved Dost Mohammad Khan from being blinded. He was rewarded with the governorship of Bamiyan. Dost Mohammad granted it to him as a jagir, on condition that he maintain 350 cavalry. Haji Khan had to remain at Kabul himself, and entrusted Bamiyan and his designs towards Turkistan to deputies. Because Bamiyan could only be reached from Kabul through Behsud, Haji Khan sought an understanding with Yazdanbakhsh. The Mir agreed to respect Bamiyan and to let two of Haji Khan's soldiers be stationed at certain castles on the road from Sar-i Chashma to Kalu, to look after Haji Khan's people travelling that way. In return, Haji Khan assigned him an annual allowance of one hundred kharwars of wheat from the produce of Bamiyan. Mir Baz Ali received fifty kharwars, and lesser chiefs smaller amounts.

In 1830 Haji Khan's deputy at Bamiyan, Rahimdad Khan, was won over by Mir Muhammad Ali Beg, the Tajik ruler of Saighan. Muhammad Ali Beg maintained 400 horsemen by raiding the Hazara districts and selling captives to the Uzbeks, and was notorious among the Hazaras for his slave raids. Yazdanbakhsh, who had already won over the Tatar chiefs of Dasht-i Safid against him, assumed that the new alliance had been ordered from Kabul. He expelled Haji Khan's soldiers from Behsud. Joined by Mir Zafar, the Hazara chief of Kalu, he levied contributions on Iraq and Shibar and entered the valley of Bamiyan. There Allahdad Khan Mughal, who held the castle of Sayyidabad, took his side, and the other castle-holders submitted. He besieged Rahimdad Khan in the governor's castle opposite the colossal statues, and occupied all of Bamiyan except that castle.

That year Haji Khan was with Dost Mohammad on a campaign in Tagab, and, according to Masson, the two agreed that the Mir had to be "circumvented". Through his Shi'a friends in Kabul, and particularly Khan Shirin Khan, Haji Khan persuaded the Mir that Rahimdad had acted without orders. He replaced his deputy and swore on a Qur'an to forget the past. The Mir then evacuated Bamiyan. In 1831, when Amir Muhammad Khan and Haji Khan came to Behsud, Yazdanbakhsh refused to attend their camp. He went with 2,000 horsemen on pilgrimage to the shrine of Ali at Band-e Amir. From there he marched into the Saighan valley and drew up his forces for battle on several days, but Muhammad Ali Beg declined to fight.

== The expedition of 1832 ==
In 1832 Haji Khan obtained a two-year contract to collect the revenues of Behsud. Masson writes that Dost Mohammad farmed the tribute to him for 40,000 rupees, "the destruction of that chief being also undoubtedly a secret condition". Dost Mohammad promised him 1,500 horsemen, two guns and an elephant, but, growing suspicious of Haji Khan, provided only about 300 horsemen. Mohan Lal gives the force as 2,000 men. Khan Shirin Khan, the leader of the Javanshirs of Kabul, acted as intermediary, and Haji Khan sent the Mir no fewer than seven oaths sworn on the Qur'an.

Haji Khan left Kabul in the month of Rabi' al-Thani 1248 AH (1832) and marched through Jalrez and Sar-i Chashma. Yazdanbakhsh first handed over the tribute due from himself, then met Haji Khan on the Kotal Gardan Diwal, above the Helmand. Each leader halted his troops (the Mir's numbered 1,500 horsemen) and advanced alone, and the two embraced in front of both forces. The Mir declared that he would treat Haji Khan's enemies as his own, and asked only to be placed in the front line in battle. Oaths were renewed, and Haji Khan betrothed one of his infant sons to an infant daughter of the Mir. Some 2,000 Hazara infantry were then sent to Bamiyan to join the operation against Saighan.

With the Mir's help, the revenue of Behsud was raised from 40,000 to 60,000 rupees "without the necessity of firing a musket". Full tribute was collected from districts that had formerly paid half, and tribute was obtained for the first time from Jirgai and Burjigai. Leaders of the Dai Zangi visited the camp and promised to lead Haji Khan into their country the next year. Later 400 Dai Zangi horsemen, under two young chiefs related to Yazdanbakhsh, joined the Hazara force at Bamiyan. With 2,500 Hazara troops and the cautious support of the Dai Zangi chiefs, Haji Khan was in a position to take Saighan.

Instead, he negotiated a treaty with Muhammad Ali Beg, who acknowledged himself Haji Khan's tributary and gave him his daughter in marriage. Haji Khan made Yazdanbakhsh and the other Hazara chiefs swear reconciliation with Muhammad Ali Beg on a Qur'an. Suspicious of the new alliance, Mir Baz Ali, the most important Hazara chief after Yazdanbakhsh, left the camp by night with about 500 horsemen. About 2,000 Hazara horsemen remained, under Yazdanbakhsh and the two Dai Zangi chiefs.

== Arrest ==
After a reconnaissance on the Dasht-i Safid, Haji Khan summoned Yazdanbakhsh to his tent, together with his brother Mir Abbas, other relatives and officers, and the two Dai Zangi chiefs. He accused the Mir of having brought defeat on his troops. The Mir replied: "Khan, place me in front and see what I will do with the Tatars." Haji Khan then ordered the arrest of the Mir and his companions. The Hazara force, deprived of its chiefs, scattered in the snow. The Kakar troops plundered the fugitives and stripped the prisoners of their clothes. Only the Mir was allowed to keep his clothing, though his knife was taken from his belt. Yazdanbakhsh later reported that 310 of his men were missing. Masson thought that many of them had died of cold and that most had been captured by Muhammad Ali Beg.

To the Shi'a officers of his army, Haji Khan justified the arrest by claiming that Dost Mohammad had repeatedly written to him to seize the Mir. He also accused Yazdanbakhsh of plotting with the Tatars, and read out a letter supposedly taken from the Mir's messenger to them. Masson, who was in the camp, states that the letter was known to be a forgery, written by Ghulam Hakamzada at Haji Khan's suggestion. He adds that on the Mir's person was found a letter telling his people at Kharzar to prepare to entertain Haji Khan on his return, and that his steward, Mir Ali Khan, had been sent to Kabul to buy ten kharwars of rice for the occasion. Masson also noted that, had the Mir been faithless, he could easily have destroyed Haji Khan's army on the borders of Burjigai, and that Haji Khan's own deputy, Sa'd al-Din, who had been the go-between in all his dealings with the Mir, was astounded by the arrest. The night before, Yazdanbakhsh's followers had begged him to flee. He had already put a foot in the stirrup, but withdrew it, saying that "he was a Kohistani, or man of the hills", bound to Haji Khan by oaths that he would keep even at the cost of his life.

Haji Khan offered to release the Mir in return for 20,000 rupees, the surrender of Kharzar and two or three other castles on the Bamiyan–Kabul road, an undertaking not to levy duties on caravans, and hostages. The other Hazara chiefs present at Bamiyan were fined 30,000 rupees. Muhammad Ali Beg urged that the Mir be put to death. Yazdanbakhsh and the principal captives were put in fetters, whose locks were sealed with molten lead. They were taken back to Bamiyan on ponies. Mohan Lal's account, written later, gives a similar description of the seizure and the treatment of the prisoners.

== Death ==
The Mir's letters to his followers, asking them to hand over Kharzar, were ignored. Kharzar was held against Haji Khan under the Mir's steward Mir Ali Khan and an officer named Kasim, while Mir Baz Ali consulted there with the Mir's supporters on resistance. On 8 Rajab 1248 AH (2 December 1832), after a secret conference with his brothers, Haji Khan ordered the Mir's execution. Masson reports the scene in detail. The Mir's request to have his hands untied so that he could pray was refused. When asked whether he had anything to say, he replied: "No; what have I to say? They must all follow me". He was strangled with a rope held by six kinsmen, among them his brother Mir Abbas, who was compelled to take part, and two sons of Wakil Saifullah, who were thus given the chance to avenge their father. His body was sent at once to Kharzar. Masson writes that his firmness was admired even by his executioners.

Noelle places his death at Sayyidabad. Masson, who was at Bamiyan at the time, places it at the governor's castle facing the colossal statues. Nayel places it between Bamiyan and Siyahsang.

== Responsibility ==
Haji Khan justified himself by accusing Yazdanbakhsh of foiling his campaign and by claiming that he had acted on Dost Mohammad Khan's orders. According to the historian Christine Noelle, it is doubtful that Dost Mohammad approved of his actions. Masson, by contrast, regarded the Mir's destruction as a secret condition of Haji Khan's appointment. The Afghan historian Hussain Nayel shares this view. Masson also formed the impression that Haji Khan was considering taking independent authority at Bamiyan with the Mir's support. After the arrest, he suggested that Haji Khan had seized the Mir in the hope of a large ransom to keep his troops through the winter at Bamiyan. Noelle likewise suggests that the arrest was possibly driven by short-term economic considerations: Haji Khan had spent the revenues of Bamiyan and had to provide for his troops through the winter.

== Aftermath ==
The execution did not bring about the immediate surrender of Kharzar. The castle was later surrendered. When Masson afterwards passed through Kharzar, the castle built by Yazdanbakhsh was held by an Afghan garrison, and his father's castle by Muhammad Ali Beg's men.

Before returning to Kabul, Haji Khan released the Mir's relatives, who had been held in fetters. He told them that the Mir's death and their treatment had been ordered from Kabul. According to Masson, Mir Abbas, the principal among them, then began to plunder caravans.

In Kabul, Dost Mohammad Khan reproached Haji Khan with the murder. Haji Khan asked whether it had not been committed on his orders. Dost Mohammad replied: "I never told you to take seven false oaths, and afterwards to kill the man." When Haji Khan asked how Dost Mohammad had himself trapped and killed the chiefs of Kohistan, the amir answered that he "had sent logs of wood and not Korans". Mohan Lal records the same exchange. Dost Mohammad used Haji Khan's conduct towards Yazdanbakhsh as a pretext to remove him from the government of Bamiyan and appoint his own son, Ghulam Haidar Khan.

Masson records that Gulistan Khan, the Hazara chief of Qarabagh south of Ghazni, refused an invitation from Amir Muhammad Khan, the governor of Ghazni, with a parable. On the road, he said, he had met Mir Yazdanbakhsh carrying his own head, who asked: "Is not my fate a warning to you?" Mohan Lal tells the same story but addresses the invitation to Dost Mohammad Khan.

Behsud became independent of Kabul again during the First Anglo-Afghan War. Dost Mohammad Khan re-established control there in 1843, in the Hazarajat Campaign of 1843.

Nayel's biographical chapter on him is titled "Mir Yazdanbakhsh, a man of faith and resistance". It draws mainly on Masson, Mohan Lal and Adamec. Nayel notes that Yazdanbakhsh is little known in Afghan sources, and that Masson's account is the most detailed.

== Sources ==
- Lal, Mohan (1846). Life of the Amir Dost Mohammed Khan of Kabul. Vol. 1. London: Longman, Brown, Green, and Longmans.
- Masson, Charles (1842). Narrative of Various Journeys in Balochistan, Afghanistan, and the Panjab; Including a Residence in Those Countries from 1826 to 1838. Vol. 2–3. London: Richard Bentley.
- Nayel, Hussain (2000). "Mīr Yazdānbakhsh, mard-i īmān wa muqāwamat" [Mir Yazdanbakhsh, a man of faith and resistance]. Yāddāshthā-ī dar bāra-yi sarzamīn wa rijāl-i Hazārajāt یادداشتهایی درباره سرزمین و رجال هزاره‌جات [Notes on the land and notable men of the Hazarajat] (in Persian) (1st ed.). Qom: Markaz-i Farhangi-yi Nawisandagan-i Afghanistan. ISBN 964-350-676-2.
- Noelle, Christine (1997). State and Tribe in Nineteenth-Century Afghanistan: The Reign of Amir Dost Muhammad Khan (1826–1863). Routledge. ISBN 978-0-7007-0629-7.
