= Abdul Taleb Zaki =

Afghan politician (1960–1998)

Abdul Taleb Zaki عبدالطالب ذکی
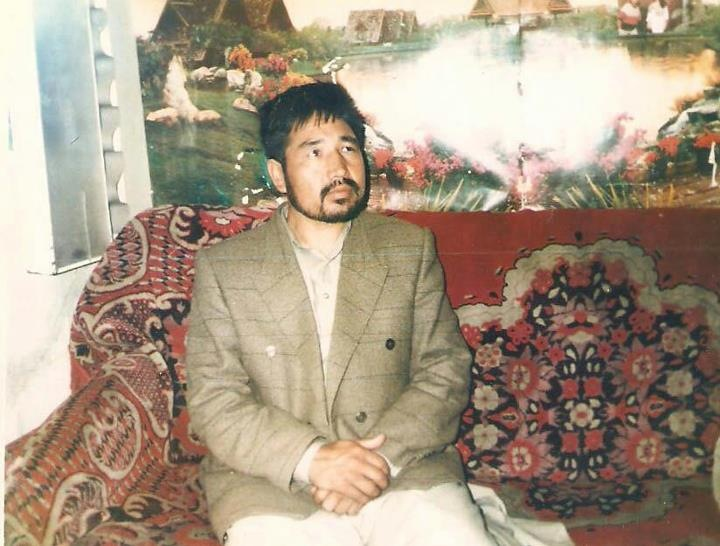
- Abdul Taleb Zaki

Governor of Bamyan Province
- In office 1994–1998

Personal details
- Born: 1960 Bamyan Province, Afghanistan
- Died: 1998 (aged 37–38) Ghazni Province, Afghanistan
- Party: Hezbe Wahdat
- Occupation: Politician, military

Abdul Taleb Zaki (Dari: عبدالطالب ذکی) was an Afghan politician and jihadist. He was from Hazara ethnicity.

Abdul Taleb Zaki, son of Abdul Wahid was born in 1960 in Bamiyan Province of Afghanistan. He is one of the jihadists of Hezbe Wahdat political party in Afghanistan. He was the governor of Bamiyan Province for four years from 1994 to 1998. He died in 1998 in Ghazni Province.
