= Blasphemy law in Afghanistan =

Religious law

Afghanistan uses Sharia as its justification for punishing blasphemy. The punishments are among the harshest in the world. Afghanistan uses its law against blasphemy to persecute religious minorities, apostasy, dissenters, academics, and journalists.

== The constitution ==
The Constitution of Afghanistan, ratified in January 2004, makes Islam the state religion. The President and the vice-presidents must be Muslim. The great majority of Afghanistan's citizens are Sunni who follow the Hanafi school of jurisprudence.

== Sharia ==
Afghanistan's Penal Code of 1976 addresses "Crimes Against Religions" but leaves the issue of blasphemy to Sharia. Sharia permits the authorities to treat blasphemy as a capital crime. The authorities can punish blasphemy with death if the blasphemy is committed by a male of sound mind over age 18 or by a female of sound mind over age 16. Anyone accused of blasphemy has three days to recant. If an accused does not recant, death by hanging may follow.

== Media law 2004 ==
Writings considered anti-Islamic are prohibited under a vaguely worded media law which came into effect in March 2004. The law stipulates that journalists can be legally detained only with the approval of a seventeen-member commission of government officials and journalists. The authorities detained journalist Ali Mohaqiq Nasab in 2005 without regard for the media law.

== Baháʼí Faith ==
In May 2007, the General Directorate of Fatawa and Accounts under the Afghan Supreme Court, which provides guidance on ambiguous religious issues not addressed in the Constitution or other laws, issued a ruling on the status of followers of the Baháʼí Faith. The ruling said "Baháʼísm" was distinct from Islam and a form of blasphemy. The ruling also declared all Muslims who convert to the Baháʼí Faith are apostates, and all followers of the religion are infidels. See Baháʼí Faith in Afghanistan and Apostasy in Islam.

== Selected cases ==
In early November 2007, authorities arrested and detained Ghaus (also Ghaws) Zalmai for publishing an unofficial translation of the Quran in the Dari language. Parliament prohibited Zalmai from leaving the country. In 2009, a court sentenced Zalmai to twenty years in prison for blasphemy. Malawi Mushtaq Ahmad, who sanctioned the translation, was arrested in June 2008.

On 27 October 2007, police arrested Sayed Pervez Kambaksh, a student at Balkh University and a journalist for Jahan-e-Naw (New World), a daily, after he allegedly distributed writing posted on the Internet by Arash Bikhoda (Arash the atheist). Bikhoda's writing criticizes the treatment of women in Islamic societies. On 22 January 2008, a court sentenced Kambaksh to death for "blasphemy and distribution of texts defamatory of Islam." The court relied on a confession which Kambaksh denounced as a product of torture. In October 2008, the Court of Appeals in Kabul upheld the conviction but commuted the sentence to imprisonment for twenty years. On 11 or 12 February 2009, the Afghan Supreme Court upheld the sentence of twenty years. In late August 2009, Kambaksh left Afghanistan after a grant of "amnesty" by President Hamid Karzai.

In October 2005, Ali Mohaqiq Nasab, a journalist and an editor of a women's rights magazine, was sentenced by a tribunal to two years in prison for blasphemy because he questioned the harsh punishments imposed on women under Sharia, and because he said conversion from Islam should not be a crime. Nasab was released in December 2005 after his sentence was reduced on appeal.

In August 2003, the Afghan Supreme Court upheld death sentences for journalists Sayeed Mahdawi and Ali Reza Payam. Afghan authorities accused the journalists of blasphemy for saying the Islam practiced in Afghanistan was reactionary, for criticizing the political use of the religion by conservative leaders, and for asking: "If Islam is the last and the most complete of the revealed religions, why are the Muslim countries lagging behind the modern world?" The journalists went into hiding before the sentences were pronounced.

In 2003, two editors of the weekly Aftab were jailed for a week on blasphemy charges for publishing a controversial series of articles condemning crimes committed by senior Afghan leaders in the name of Islam. The two editors were later cleared of the charges, but they were forced to leave Afghanistan because of threats against their lives.
