= Muhammad Hussain Fahimi =

Afghan politician (born 1963)

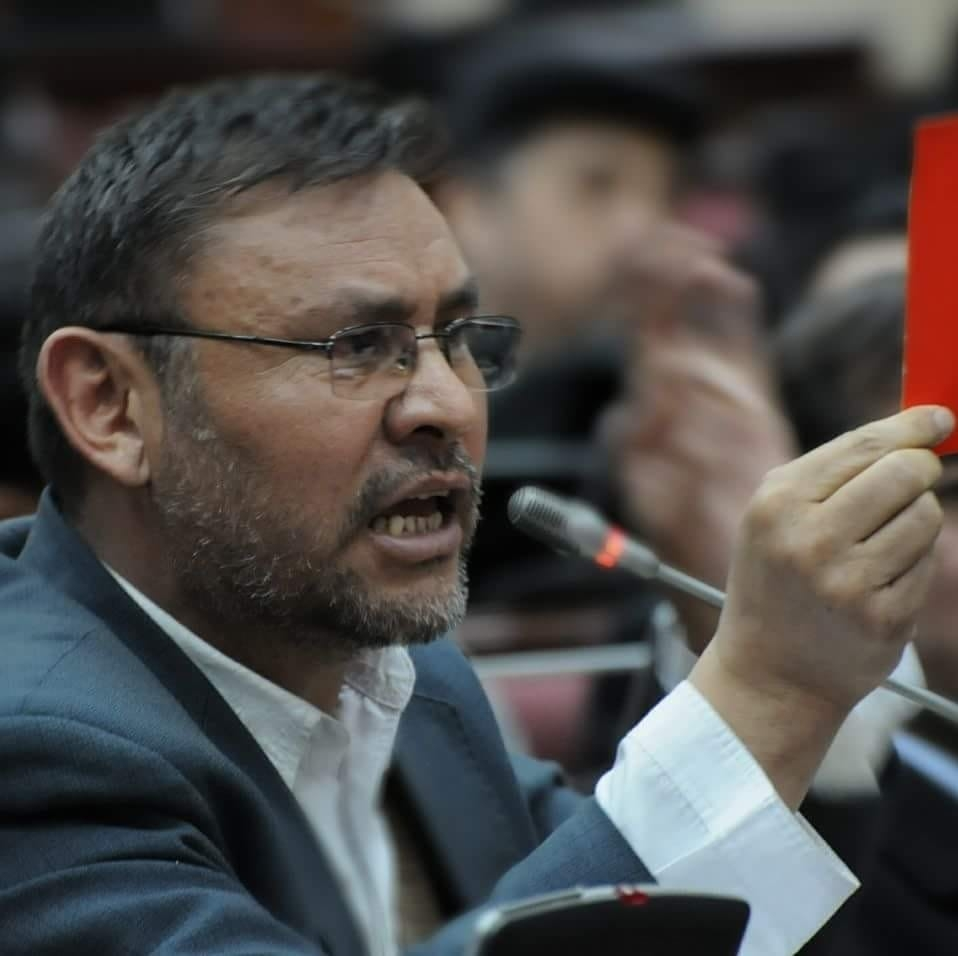

Afghanistan Parliament

Personal details
- Born: 1963 (age 62–63) Balkhab, Sar-e Pol, Afghanistan
- Domestic partner: Sima Gul Fahimi
- Children: Bezhan Fahimi, Ramin Fahimi, Hamed Fahimi, Deba Fahimi
- Occupation: Politician and Warlord

Muhammad Hussain Fahimi (Dari: محمد حسین فهیمی) is an Afghan politician who represented the Sar-e Pol province in the 15th and 16th term of the Afghanistan Parliament.

== Early life ==
Muhammad Hussain Fahimi was born in 1963 in the Balkhab district of Sar-e-Pul Province in northern Afghanistan. He pursued his religious education in Iran, obtaining his bachelor's degree there, and later earned a bachelor's degree in Law and Political Science from Kateb University.

His career began as an Afghan Warlord in Sar-e-Pul province after the Taliban took control over Afghanistan in 1996. He formed an anti-Taliban front in the Balkhab area of Sar-E Pul. Additionally, he holds the rank of a four-star general in the Afghan National Army (ANA) and served as the director of logistics for the 209 Shahin Command.

After a lifetime of service to the country, he ran for the 15th term of the Afghanistan National Assembly. Securing the majority of votes, he became the Representative of Sar-e Pol province in the National Assembly, also known as the Wolesi Jirga.

== Assassination Attempts ==
Three Times: Robatak Village - Samangan Province - Attack on Fahimi's Convoy Sar-E Pul Province - IED on Sima Gul Fahimi's car Sar-E Pol Province - Attack on his residential compound and one causality.

== See also ==
- List of Hazara people
