= Arman Monthly =

Arman is the monthly publication of the association of Hazaras in Victoria which serves the growing Afghan community of Melbourne and is distributed Australia-wide. It is published on the first Monday of each month and has a readership base of several thousand. The magazine has three editions, in Dari, in Pashtu and English. Being the only regularly published and widely distributed Dari magazine in Australia, Arman is a valuable source of news, information, feature articles as well as a guide to find products and services for Afghan community.

The first edition of Arman was published in October 2002 in eight pages. It is now a colour magazine in 40 pages and is popular in the Australian Afghan community.

Currently Hamed Saberi is Arman monthly's chief editor and Sharif Samar is the executive officer. It is designed by Arif Fayazi.
