= Babak Fahimi =

Babak Fahimi is professor at University of Texas at Dallas. Fahimi was named Fellow of the Institute of Electrical and Electronics Engineers (IEEE) in 2015 for "contributions to modeling and analysis of AC adjustable speed motor drives".

In 2017, Fahimi was awarded the Distinguished Chair in Engineering from the University of Texas at Dallas.
