= Afghan Australians =

استرالیایی های افغان‌تبار (Dari) د اسټرالیا افغانان (Pashto)

Total population
- 59,797 (by birth, 2021)

Regions with significant populations
- Victoria: 25,432
- New South Wales: 14,623
- South Australia: 8,214
- Western Australia: 5,724
- Queensland: 4,733

Languages
- Dari (Persian dialect), Pashto, other languages of Afghanistan and English

Religion
- Predominantly Sunni Islam; Minority Shia Islam and Christianity

Related ethnic groups
- Afghan New Zealanders, Afghan diaspora

Afghan Australians (Dari: استرالیایی های افغان‌تبار Ostorâliyâi-hāye Afghān tabar, Pashto: د اسټرالیا افغانان Da Asṭrālyā Afghanan) are Australians tied to Afghanistan either by birth or by ancestry.

The first Afghans who migrated to Australia arrived mid 19th century as cameleers. Over subsequent decades, they played a crucial role in facilitating British exploration of the country's desert centre.

The Australian government categorises Afghanistan and all Afghan ethnic groups as Central Asian Australians.

In the 2021 Census, the top-three states with the largest Afghan-born were Victoria (25,432), New South Wales (14,623) and South Australia (8,214).

== History ==
=== 19th century ===
Although Afghans without camels are reported to have reached Australia as early as 1838, in the latter part of the 19th century several thousand men from Afghanistan, were recruited during initial British development of the outback, especially for the operation of camel trains in desert areas. The first Afghan cameleers arrived in Melbourne in June 1860, when three men arrived with a shipment of 24 camels for the Burke and Wills expedition. They continued to work in the arid interior of the continent from the 1860s to the 1930s, until finally being superseded by the development of railways and motorised road transport. The Afghans played an important supportive role in the exploration and economic development of the interior through carting water, food and materials to remote pastoral stations and mining settlements, as well as for the construction of the Overland Telegraph, and the Port Augusta to Alice Springs railway. They also had an important role in establishing the Muslim faith in Australia.

=== 20th century ===
During the 1980s Soviet–Afghan War and the Afghanistan civil wars of the 1990s (1989–1992, 1992–1996, and 1996–2001), over 7,000 Afghans arrived in Australia.

Afghan refugees, along with those of other nationalities claiming asylum in Australia, have been victims of human rights abuses in immigration detention centres. One publicised story in 2019 was of an Afghan doctor who studied in China and then claimed asylum in Australia, becoming demoralised during six years in detention and committing suicide in a Brisbane hotel.

== Inmates ==
Several Afghanistan-born individuals were imprisoned in New South Wales during the 19th and 20th centuries, with their records included in the Gaol Inmates/Prisoners Photos Index (1870-1930).

| Fullname | Date of Birth | Date of Photo | Gaol |
|---|---|---|---|
| Amen Khan | 1857 | 12/12/1887 | Darlinghurst |
| Abas Khan | 1862 | 12/12/1887 | Darlinghurst |
| Fuzzle Deen | 1852 | 16/12/1887 | Darlinghurst |
| Allum Khan | 1861 | 2/05/1894 | Bathurst |
| Gulam Rassoul | 1867 | 25/06/1895 | Bathurst |
| Mirige Gool | 1879 | 28/10/1914 | Goulburn |

== Demographics ==
Afghan Australians are composed of the various ethnic groups that exist in Afghanistan, which include Pashtun, Tajik, Hazara, Uzbek, Turkmen, Baloch, and a number of others.

Cameleers were prohibited from bringing their wives to Australia. Therefore, the Afghan demographic was almost entirely made up of men during this period.

At the time of the 2016 Australian census, there were 46,800 Australian people in Australia who had been born in Afghanistan. The 2021 census recorded 59,797 Afghan Australians, a significant increase.

== By city ==
=== Sydney ===
In Sydney, the largest portion of Afghan Australians reside in the LGAs of City of Ryde (North Ryde, Macquarie Park, Marsfield, and Top Ryde), The Hills Shire (Castle Hill, Cherrybrook, and Kellyville), Blacktown (Glenwood, Parklea, Stanhope Gardens and Bella Vista) and Sutherland Shire (Miranda). Ethnic Hazaras are believed to reside in suburbs such as Auburn and Merrylands.

In Sydney there are several mosques at which Afghans gather, one located in North Ryde and another located in Auburn. The largest and most significant mosque is located in Blacktown, where the new mosque was inaugurated on 3 May 2014, after being reconstructed on the site of the old mosque. Across the road from the mosque is a cultural centre that hosts ceremonies such as wakes, community elections, awards etc. Custodianship of both properties belongs to the Afghan Community Support Association, the largest association representing Afghans in Australia.

There are two Saturday schools for Afghan Australian youths:

- Esteqlal Afghan Saturday School located at Castle Hill Library
- Top Ryde Persian Saturday School located at Ryde Public School

=== Melbourne ===
In Melbourne the majority of Afghans live in Greater Dandenong and Casey. The recent arrival of Afghan asylum seekers by boat has changed the demography of the Afghan Australian community in a significant way. Once only a tiny minority, Hazaras are now more common among the Afghan Australian community in all major cities and small country towns such as Shepparton, Mildura and Swan Hill in Victoria and Griffith in NSW.

=== Other cities ===
Smaller communities of Afghans are also found in Adelaide, Brisbane and Perth. Australian residents at the time of the 2006 Census who were born in Afghanistan arrived mostly in the 1990s (7,707) and since 2000 (8,554). Very few had arrived before 1979 (149). At that time, 9,356 (56%) had acquired Australian citizenship.

== Language ==
Most Afghan Australians are fluent in English and their native Afghan languages such as Pashto, Persian (Dari, and Hazaragi).

== Religion ==
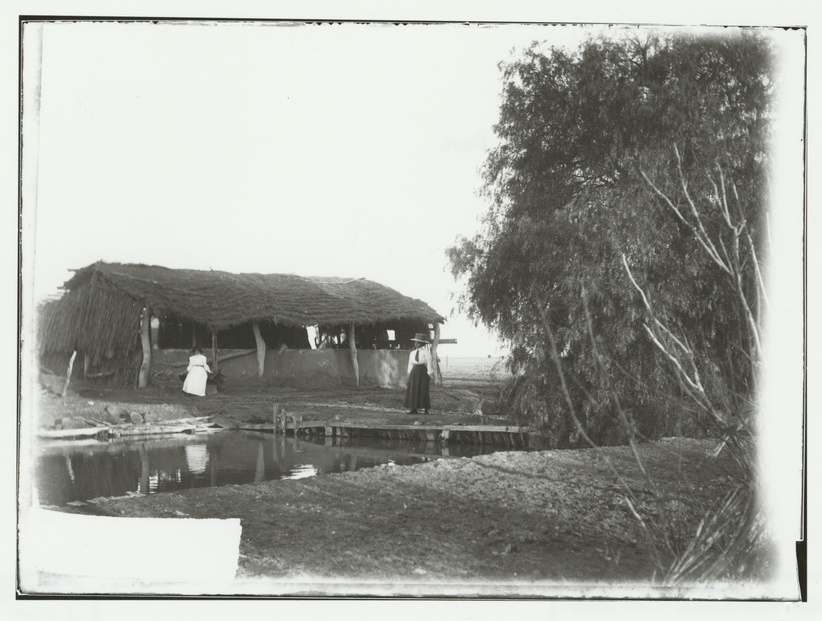
Mosque used by Afghans photographed in 1909

Most Afghan Australians are Muslims, with an additional small minority of Christians. The Marree Mosque, the first mosque in Australia, was built by Afghan cameleers in the 19th century, and many more mosques were subsequently built by Afghan Australians, including the Adelaide Mosque in 1888–1889, the oldest permanent mosque in Australia.

== In film ==
- A 2020 documentary, The Afghan Cameleers in Australia, directed by Afghan/Australian filmmaker Fahim Hashimy, explores and records the relationships that many cameleers formed with Aboriginal women, and their descendants.
- The 2020 drama feature film, The Furnace is set during the gold rushes in Western Australia and highlights the roles of Afghan cameleers.
- Watandar, My Countryman is a documentary film directed by Jolyon Hoff and co-written and co-produced by Hazara photographer Muzafar Ali, who arrived in Australia as a refugee in 2015. The film, which explores the concept of identity, arose after Ali started investigating the long history of Afghan people in Australia. It premiered at the Adelaide Film Festival in October 2022.

== Notable people ==
- Rahmat Akbari, footballer
- Rasul Amin (1939–2009), education minister in Afghanistan
- Mustafa Amini, footballer
- Ben Barba, former rugby league player
- Ruqia Haidari, murder victim
- Yalda Hakim, TV journalist
- Saad Mohseni, businessman
- Fatima Payman, Australian Senator since 2022
- Hussain Sadiqi, actor and martial arts artist
- Amin Saikal, academic
- Mahmoud Saikal, diplomat
- Bobuq Sayed, writer
- Mariam Veiszadeh, lawyer and writer
- Mullah Abdullah, butcher, cameleer and spree killer

== See also ==
- Hazara Australians
- Baloch Australians
- Anti-Afghan sentiment
- Iranian Australians
