= Lina Mangiacapre =

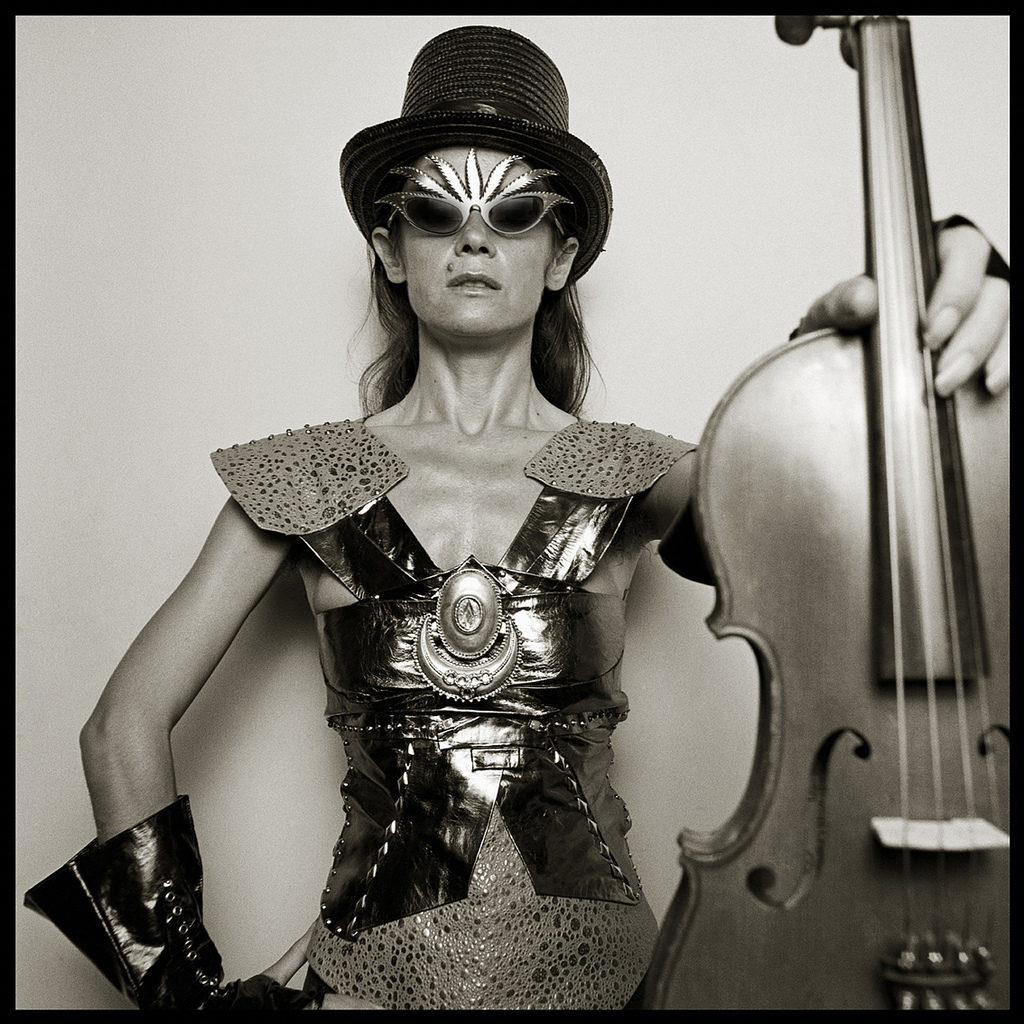
Lina Mangiacapre in 1987, photographed by Augusto De Luca

Lina Mangiacapre (1946 - 23 May 2002) was an Italian feminist playwright and filmmaker.

== Life ==
Born Carmela Mangiacapre to an upper-middle-class family in Naples, she became involved with the feminist and radical student movements during the social movements of 1968. She graduated with a degree in philosophy and devoted herself to painting under the pseudonym Màlina. In 1970 she founded the feminist collective Le Nemesiache, named in tribute to Nemesis.

In 1972 she authored a play, Cenerella, later adapted into a film of the same name. In 1976 she established a film criticism magazine under the aegis of Le Nemesiache. In 1977 she founded the cooperative Le tre Ghinee ("The three Guineas"), with the objective of fostering women's artistic creations.

In 1986 she directed the film Didone non è morta, and in 1987 created a film prize, the Elvira Notari Prize, managed by a jury which she chaired until 2001, and awarded as part of the Venice Film Festival. In 1987 she founded the Manifesta, a quarterly publication devoted to cinema and culture.

In 1990 the presidency of the Italian council of ministers awarded her the Prize for Culture. The following year she released her second feature film, Faust Fausta, based on her novel of the same name. In 1993 she directed Femme de cœur, based on a screenplay by Luciano Crovato. In 1996, on the 50th anniversary of Italian women's gaining the right to vote, she produced the short film Da elettrici ad elette.

She also wrote for various newspapers and magazines, including l'Unità, Paese Sera, Quotidiano donna, Effe, and Femmes en Mouvement.

She died in Naples on 23 May 2002.

== Legacy ==
In 2015 she was the subject of a documentary, Lina Mangiacapre: Artista del femminismo, directed by Nadia Pizzuti. In 2017 the municipality of Naples named a scenic lookout in her honor. The Elvira Notari Prize, which she had established in 1987, was later renamed the Lina Mangiacapre Prize.

== Works ==
=== Theater ===
- Cenerella (1973/1975)
- Prigioniere politiche (1978)
- Faro (1979)
- Per Ofelia (1980)
- Eliogabalo (1982)
- Eleniade (1983), winner of the Premio Fondi La Pastora
- Biancaneve (1984)
- Viaggio nel mito di Capri (1992)

=== Film ===
- Cenerella (1974)
- Autocoscienze (1976)
- Antistrip (1976)
- Le Sibille (1977), winner of the prize for best director at the Trieste Science+Fiction Festival
- Follia come poesia (1977/1979), filmed with the patients of a psychiatric hospital in Naples
- Ricciocapriccio (1981)
- Didone non è Morta (1987)

=== Writings ===
- Cinema al femminile, Padua, Mastrogiacomo, 1980
- Faust/Fausta, Florence, L'Autore Libri, 1990
- Il mare sarà solo, Calcata, Edizioni del Giano
- Cinema al femminile 2, Naples, Le tre ghinee, 1994
- Donne e unicorni, Naples, Le tre ghinee, 1995
- Pentesilea, Naples, Le tre ghinee, 1996
- Amazzoni e Minotauri, Rimini, Raffaelli, 2008
