= Sayed Askar Mousavi =

Afghan Hazara writer (born 1956)

Sayed Askar Mousavi سید عسکر موسوی
- Born: Sayed Askar; 1956 (age 69–70); Karte Sakhi, Kabul, Kingdom of Afghanistan
- Education: University of East Anglia; St Antony's College, Oxford
- Occupations: Novelist, writer
- Writing career
- Notable work: Author of The Hazaras of Afghanistan

Sayed Askar Mousavi (Dari: سید عسکر موسوی) is an anthropologist from Afghanistan. He is the author of The Hazaras of Afghanistan published on January 29, 2009, by Cambridge University.

Sayed Askar Mousavi was born in 1956 in a family belonging to the Sayyid ethnic group in Karte Sakhi area of Kabul, Afghanistan.

He was educated at the University of East Anglia (BA Development Studies, 1987) and St Antony's College, Oxford (MLitt; Ph.D.). Sayed Askar Mousavi was a prominent figure in the "cultural struggle" of the Afghan Mujahideen in Iran during the Soviet occupation. He was the main writer and editor of a few publications, including Saaf, and Jawali.

== See also ==
- List of Hazara people
