= Hassan Poladi =

Hassan Poladi حسن پولادی
- Born: Hassan; December 20, 1944; Quetta, British India
- Died: October 9, 1989 (aged 44); Stockton, California
- Resting place: Stockton, California
- Citizenship: American
- Education: MA, Sociology
- Alma mater: University of Sind and University of Philippines, Manila
- Occupations: Writer and Intellectual
- Writing career
- Language: Dari-Persian (Hazaragi), Urdu and English
- Subject: Hazaras
- Notable work: The Hazaras

Hassan Poladi (also referred to as Hassan Foladi) (1944–1989) was the writer of The Hazaras, a book about the Hazara people. Poladi was born in Quetta, as a second-generation Hazara. He grew up and got his early education from local schools and colleges, and did his BSc (Honors) from the University of Sind. He later got admission to the University of Philippines, Manila, and did his MA. After working for the provincial government of Balochistan, he moved to the USA on a research assistant fellowship. In 1975 he received his master's degree from Cornell University, Ithaca, New york. He was a naturalized American Citizen, and lived with his family in Stockton, California. In addition to his native Persian Hazaragi, he was fluent in English, Urdu and Filipino. His contribution to the Hazara people is his book The Hazaras. It has been translated into Persian and Urdu.

Poladi died on October 9, 1989, due to liver failure.

== See also ==
- List of Hazara people
- List of people from Quetta
