= Mansoor Ali Khan (journalist) =

Pakistani Journalist and television anchor (born 1976)

- Born: 22 April 1976 (age 50); Lahore, Punjab, Pakistan
- Education: Aitchison College; Government College University; Virtual University (MSc)
- Occupations: Journalist; broadcaster; podcaster
- Years active: 2007–present
- Employers: Dawn News (2007); CNBC Pakistan (2008); Geo News (2008–2010); Star Asia News (2010–2011); Geo News (2011–2014); BOL Network (2014–2015); ARY News (2015–2016); Express News (2016–2022); Samaa TV (2022–2023); Hum News (2023–present)
- Television: To the Point with Mansoor Ali Khan; Meray Sawaal
- Children: 3
- Relatives: Yazdan Khan family

YouTube information
- Channel: Mansoor Ali Khan
- Years active: 2019–present
- Genres: News; politics; current affairs
- Subscribers: 2.8 million
- Views: 1.03 Billion
- Last updated: 6 November 2025

Mansoor Ali Khan (Urdu: منصور علی خان; born 22 April 1976) is a Pakistani journalist, television anchor, video blogger and podcaster.

He began his career in 2007 as a sports journalist for Dawn News and CNBC Pakistan, and joined Geo News in 2008, where he was based as a newscaster and anchorman for six years. He worked briefly for Star Asia News, BOL Network and ARY News, and joined Express News in 2016, hosting the current affairs talk show To the Point with Mansoor Ali Khan (2016–2022). Khan then hosted the talk show Meray Sawaal (2022–2023) for Samaa TV and is currently affiliated with Hum News since June 2023.

In addition to his presence on television, Khan also maintains a YouTube channel focusing on news, politics and current affairs.

== Early life and education ==
Mansoor Ali Khan was born on 22 April 1976, the son of Shaukat Ali Khan. His father ran an electronics business and is a Punjabi from Lahore, while his mother is an ethnic Hazara from Quetta. On his maternal side, he is a great-grandson of the Hazara tribal chief, Yazdan Khan and grandson of the army general Musa Khan; a nephew of the squash player and golfer Hassan Musa, and of Air-Marshal Sharbat Ali Changezi; and cousin of Mehdi Hassan Musa, a former provincial minister in Balochistan.

Khan completed his schooling from Aitchison College in Lahore in 1995, before going on to study at Government College University, where he majored in political science, history and English literature in 1999. During his studies, he was an avid swimmer, performing at the national level. In 2020, Khan obtained a master's degree in media studies from the Virtual University of Pakistan.

== Journalistic career ==
Khan began his career on television as a sports journalist and broadcaster for the English-language Dawn News in 2007. He had a brief stint as a producer and sports show host on CNBC Pakistan, before joining the Urdu channel Geo News as a newscaster and anchorperson in October 2008, based in Karachi. During his time at Geo, he notably covered the Lawyers' Movement in Pakistan, the 2009 T20 Cricket World Cup and the operation against Osama bin Laden in 2011. In addition, he made appearances on Star Asia News as a sports reporter. In 2012, he travelled to the United States to cover the U.S. presidential election for WTTW, featuring on Chicago Tonight as an international exchange journalist.

In December 2014, Khan left Geo and joined the upcoming news channel BOL Network as a content manager and anchorman. In August 2015, he parted ways with the media group in the aftermath of the Axact scandal and issued a statement, announcing that he had joined ARY News as a senior anchorman. He worked at ARY for one year, before taking up a new role with Express News in Islamabad in August 2016, hosting To the Point with Mansoor Ali Khan; a political and current affairs talk show aired at primetime. After a tenure of almost six years with Express, Khan moved to Samaa TV in May 2022, holding the slot for the talk show Meray Sawaal (lit. "my questions"). He served with Samaa for 11 months, until eventually tendering his resignation in May 2023 and joining Hum News the following month.

Khan is known for his hard-hitting questions and journalistic style. Alongside his talk show, he also runs his personal YouTube channels, where he offers his analysis on Pakistani news and politics through vlogs and podcasts. As of 2025, his main channel has crossed over 3 million subscribers.

== Controversies ==
In her 2018 memoir, Reham Khan – the former wife of politician Imran Khan – addresses the tabloid rumours attributed to the breakdown of her marriage with Imran, including one where she was accused of "poisoning" Imran, causing him to become hospitalised in 2015. Reham claims that her former husband had in fact been hospitalised due to substance abuse, and credits Mansoor Ali Khan for "digging out the original report from the hospital" to clarify her position in the media; an act that allegedly earned Mansoor a reprimanding phone call from Imran's sister, Aleema Khan. Whilst acknowledging his role in reporting the story of Khan's hospitalisation, Mansoor has denied that he was ever contacted by Aleema Khan and has raised questions about the accuracy of Reham's book.

In March 2020, Khan and his family were trolled online by anti-feminist groups after pictures of him and his wife attending an Aurat March rally in Lahore surfaced on social media. Reacting to the trolling, Khan said that despite his detractors' attempts, his stance and support for the movement "won't move an inch". Mansoor's critique of Imran Khan and his political party, the Pakistan Tehreek-e-Insaf (PTI), has often invited backlash and trolling from members and supporters of the party. He is known to frequently address Imran as mera kaptaan (lit. "my captain"), a popular, tongue-in-cheek reference to his nickname. He subsequently shared that when he confronted Imran about his use of the moniker, Imran did not object to it. In April 2022, a senior producer working with Khan at Express News, Faisal Rao, resigned from his position citing differences of opinion with Khan's political views.

In March 2023, Khan interviewed PML-N political leader Maryam Nawaz for a podcast on his YouTube channel, from which an off-air segment was later leaked onto social media and became viral. In the segment, Khan is noted to have questioned Maryam about gifts that she and her father, former premier Nawaz Sharif, had allegedly acquired from foreign dignitaries while in government, in contravention of the laws governing official gifts and the legal process to retain them. Maryam denied knowing about such gifts and responded that she could not entertain Khan's question without having access to the facts behind the allegations. She requested Khan to keep the conversation off-the-record. The leaked video, which landed Maryam in hot water amongst opposition politicians, evoked a clarification from Khan. Condemning the leak as "unethical", Khan explained that the segment had been omitted because he did not have the consent of the interviewee. Accepting responsibility for the incident, he attributed the leak to a breach of data. Khan's resignation in May from his television channel, Samaa TV, and his subsequent joining at Hum News sparked rumours that the video leak may have led to his ousting from the channel. However, Khan rebuffed these speculations, stating that he had simply resigned to take up "a promising career opportunity".

== Personal life ==
Khan is married and has three sons.

== See also ==
- List of Pakistani journalists
