= Zakia Ahmad =

Hazara woman mountaineer

Zakia Ahmad, also known as River Ahmad, is a Hazara woman mountaineer and the first woman from Afghanistan to summit Mount Everest on May 21, 2026. She paid tribute with her historic accent to millions of Afghan women and girls, using her voice and platform to advocate for women's education, freedom, and mental health.

== Early life and education ==
Ahmad was born in the 1990s in Jaghori District, Ghazni Province. She became interested in mountaineering from a young age, and joined a climbing club there as a young woman, which was unusual. In 2014, after graduating high school in Sang-e-Masha, she convinced her family to allow her to attend university in Kabul. While on the bus to the capital, the vehicle was ambushed by the Taliban, who opened fire on the passengers. She survived alongside two passengers by smearing her face with her menstrual blood and playing dead. Ahmad studied journalism in Kabul for a year before receiving a scholarship to a university in India.

In India, Ahmad earned a bachelor's degree in business administration and a master's degree in international relations. As part of her studies, she conducted interviews with poor Afghan women in Delhi. She was threatened by both the Taliban and the Afghan government for being an outspoken advocate of women's rights. She left the country in 2019.

== Life abroad ==
After leaving Afghanistan in 2019, Ahmed lived in India for several years, including some time in Delhi. In 2022, she received a humanitarian visa for Australia, where her family also fled to. In Australia, she works for a radio station.

== Mountaineering ==
Ahmad has also summited Mount Meru in Tanzania and Mont Blanc in the Alps.

=== Mount Everest climb ===
On May 21, 2026, at 7:20 am local time, Zakia Ahmad reached the peak. She stood on the peak, dedicating her climb to the women and girls in Afghanistan, telling them that their dreams are achievable.
