= Muhammad Arif Shah Jahan =

Afghan politician

Muhammad Arif Shah Jahan محمدعارف شاه‌جهان
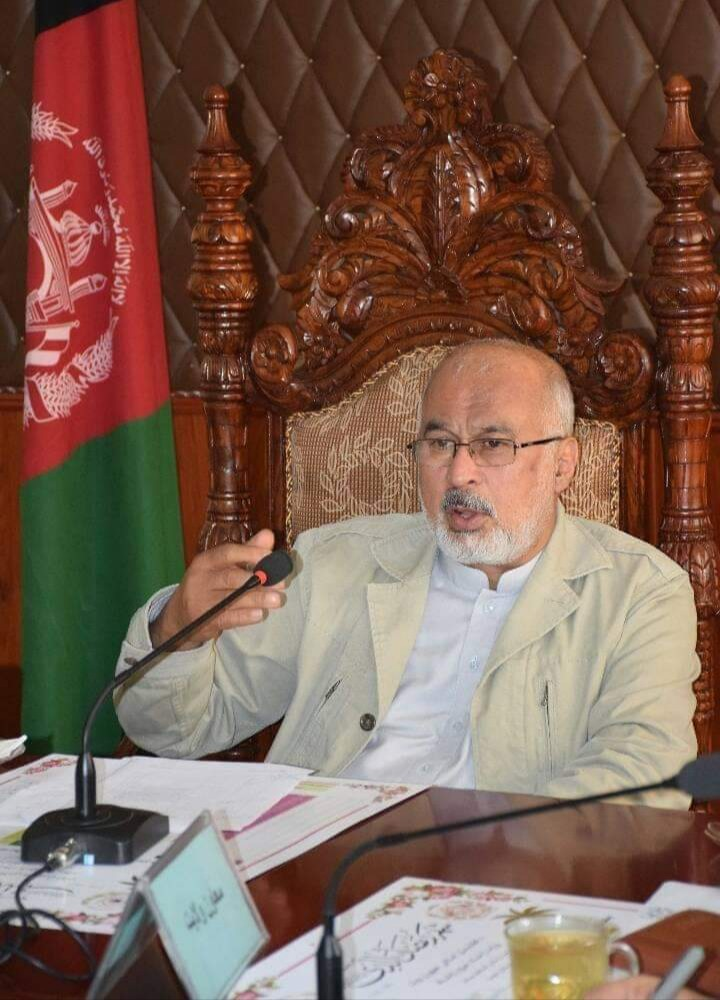

Governor of Maidan Wardak
- In office 28 November 2017 – 17 February 2018
- Preceded by: Zundi Gul Zamani
- Succeeded by: Abdul Yamen Mozafaruddin

Member of the Parliament for Ghazni province
- In office 2010–2017

Personal details
- Born: 1954 (age 71–72) Kakrak, Jaghatu district, Ghazni province
- Occupation: Politician
- Ethnicity: Hazaras

Muhammad Arif Shah Jahan (Persian: محمدعارف شاه‌جهان) is an ethnic Hazara politician, who was the former governors of Maidan Wardak and Farah provinces in Afghanistan and the former representative of the people of Ghazni province in the Parliament of Afghanistan.

== Early life ==
Muhammad Arif Shah Jahan son of Ghulam Rasool, an ethnic Hazara, born in 1954 in Kakrak, Jaghatu district, Ghazni province, Afghanistan. Shah Jahan completed his schooling in 1972 at Habibia High School in Kabul. In 1973, he enrolled in Nangarhar University of Jalalabad and in 1980, he received his bachelor's degree in medical sciences. After that, he worked for some time in Ghazni in the medical department and then joined the Mujahideen. He immigrated to the United States in 1997 and returned to his homeland in 2007.

== See also ==
- List of Hazara people
