= Kakrak =

Kakrak (Dari: ککرک) in Afghanistan may refer to:

- Kakrak Valley, Ghazni Province
- Kakrak Valley, Bamyan Province
