= Jermatu =

Jermatu جرمتو
- Country: Afghanistan
- Province: Ghazni
- District: Jaghatu
- Ethnicities: Hazara people
- Time zone: + 4.30

Jermatu (Dari: جرمتو) is a residential area of Hazaras in Afghanistan, located in the Jaghatu District of Ghazni Province.

== See also ==
- List of populated places in Afghanistan
