= Erfani =

Erfani is a surname from Iran and Afghanistan. Notable people with the surname include:

- Encieh Erfani (born 1982), Iranian cosmologist
- Hamid Erfani (born 1988), Iranian footballer
- Hossein Erfani (1942–2018), Iranian voice actor
- Khodadad Erfani (born 1953), Afghan politician
