= Almaytū =

Almaytu المیتو
- Village
- Location in Afghanistan
- Coordinates: 33.2329°N 67.3766°E
- Country: Afghanistan
- Province: Ghazni Province
- District: Jaghori

Population
  - Ethnicities: Hazara people
- Time zone: UTC+4:30

Almaytu (Dari: المیتو) is a village in Afghanistan, located in Jaghori District, Ghazni Province.

== Demographics ==
The people of Almaytu are Hazaras of the Jaghori tribe.

== See also ==
- List of populated places in Afghanistan

== Gallery ==
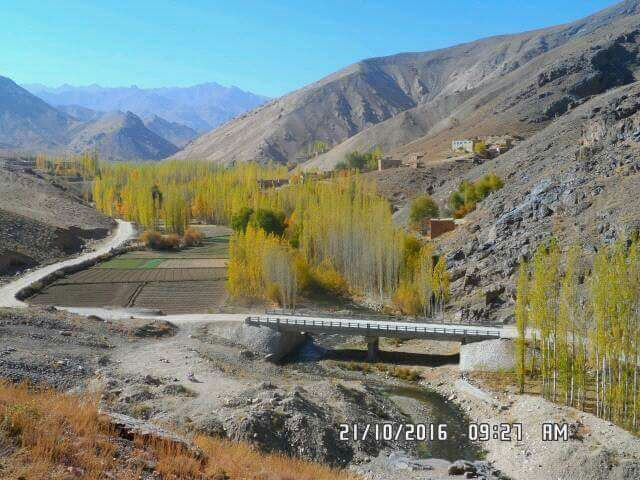
Almaytu

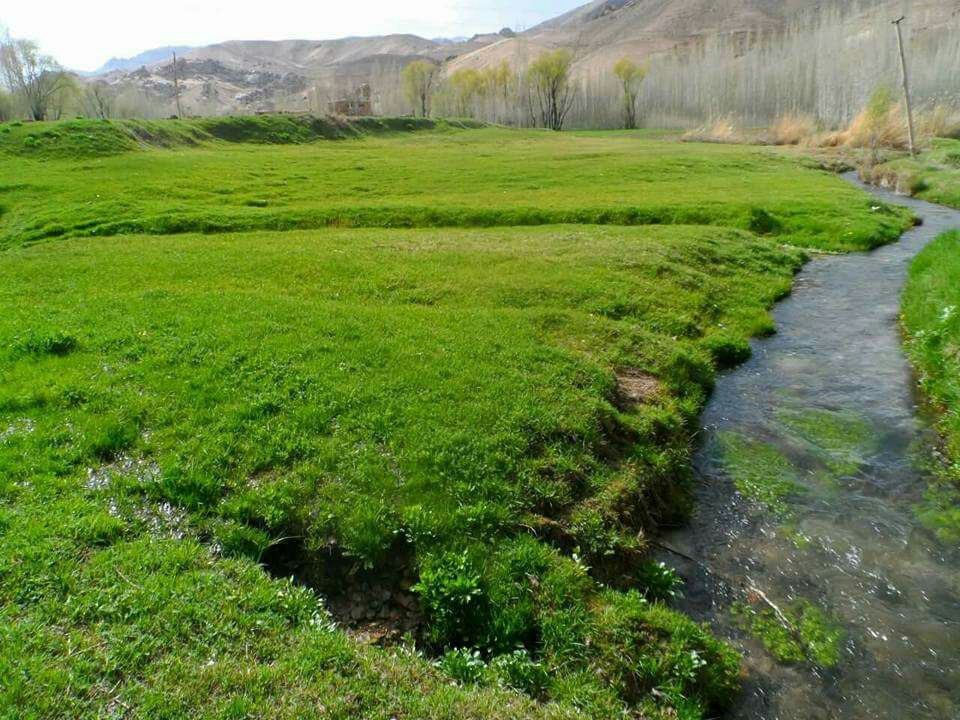
Almaytu

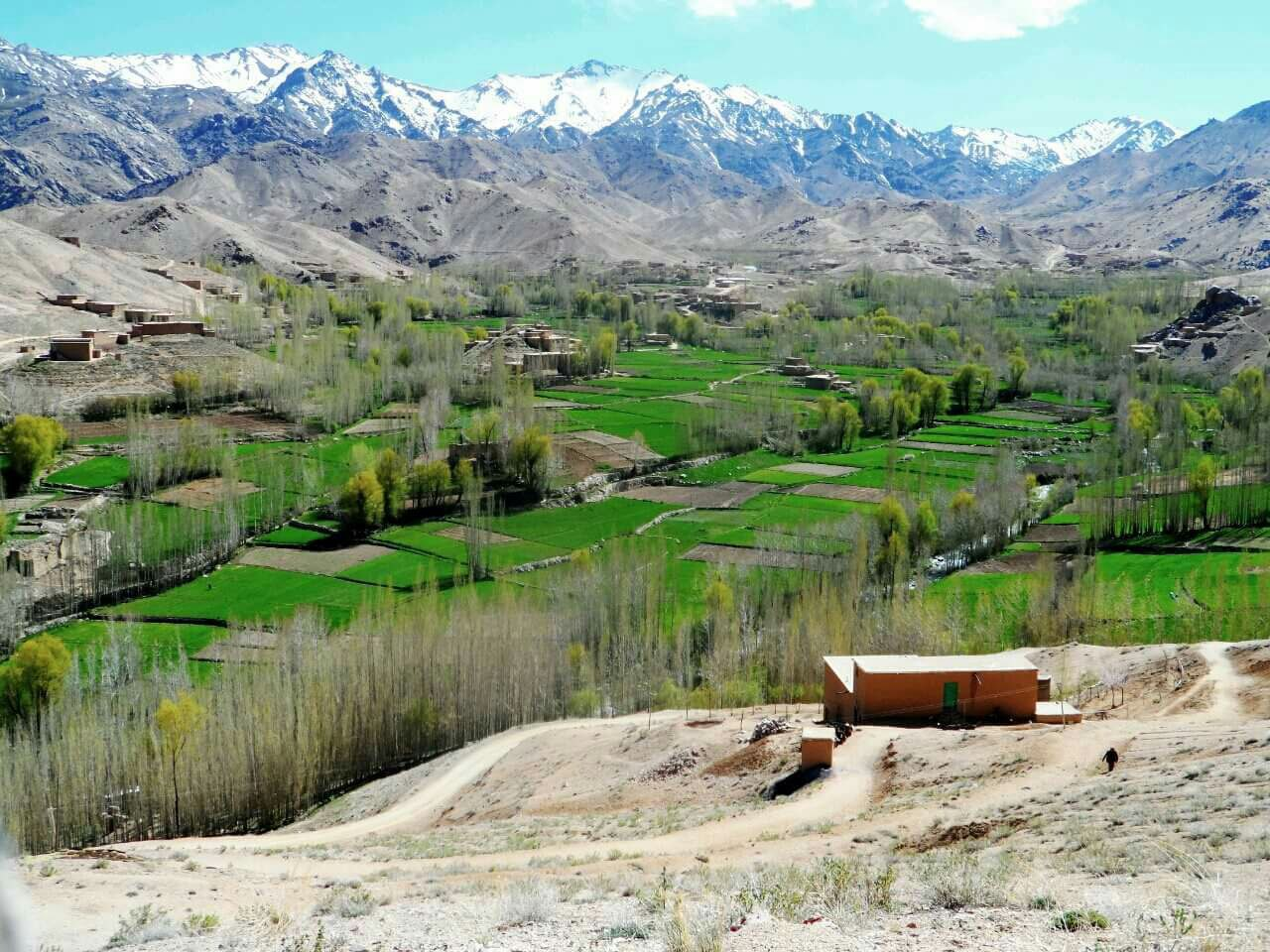
Almaytu

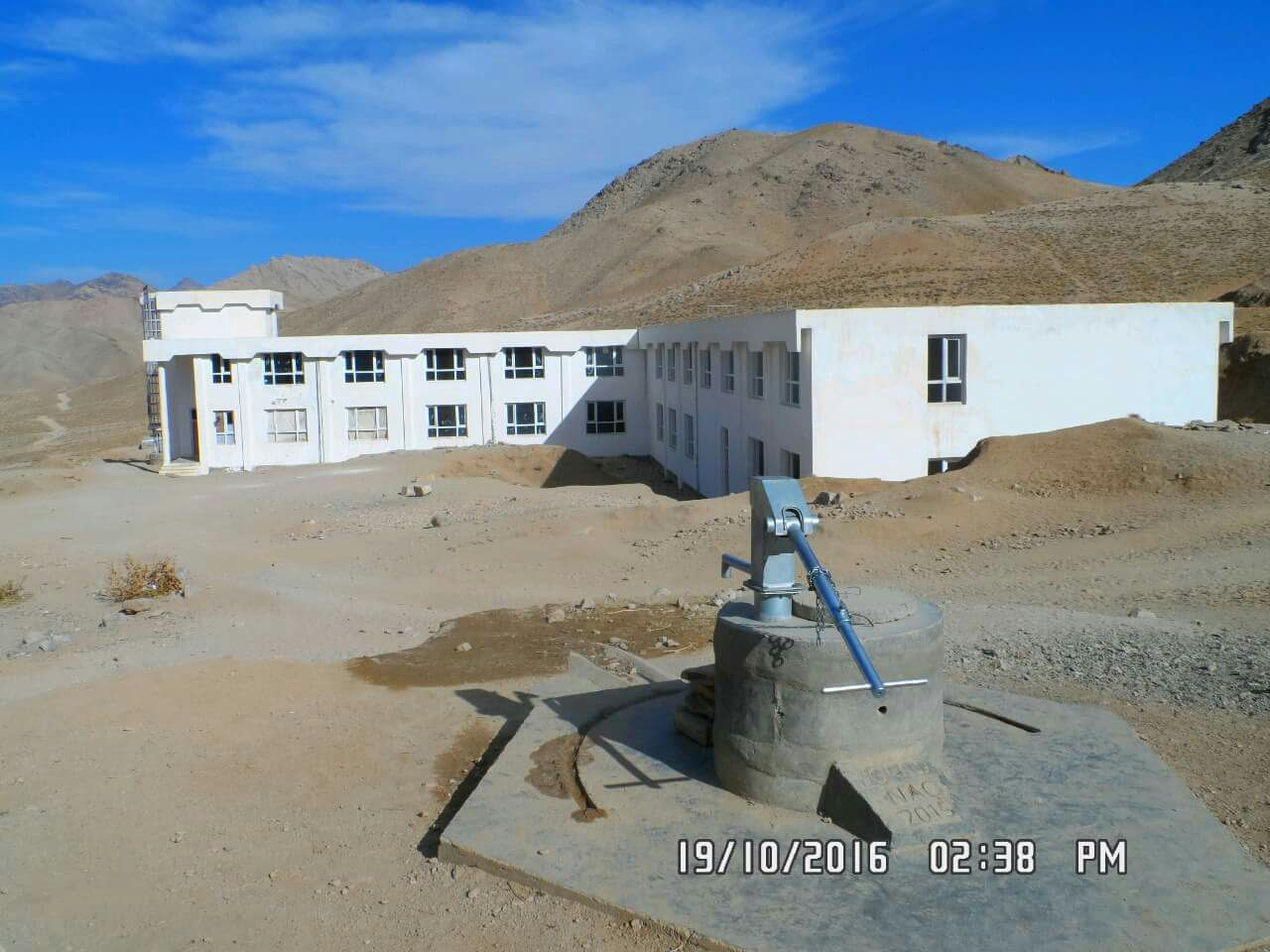
Almaytu school
