= Darah-ye Rostam =

- Valley
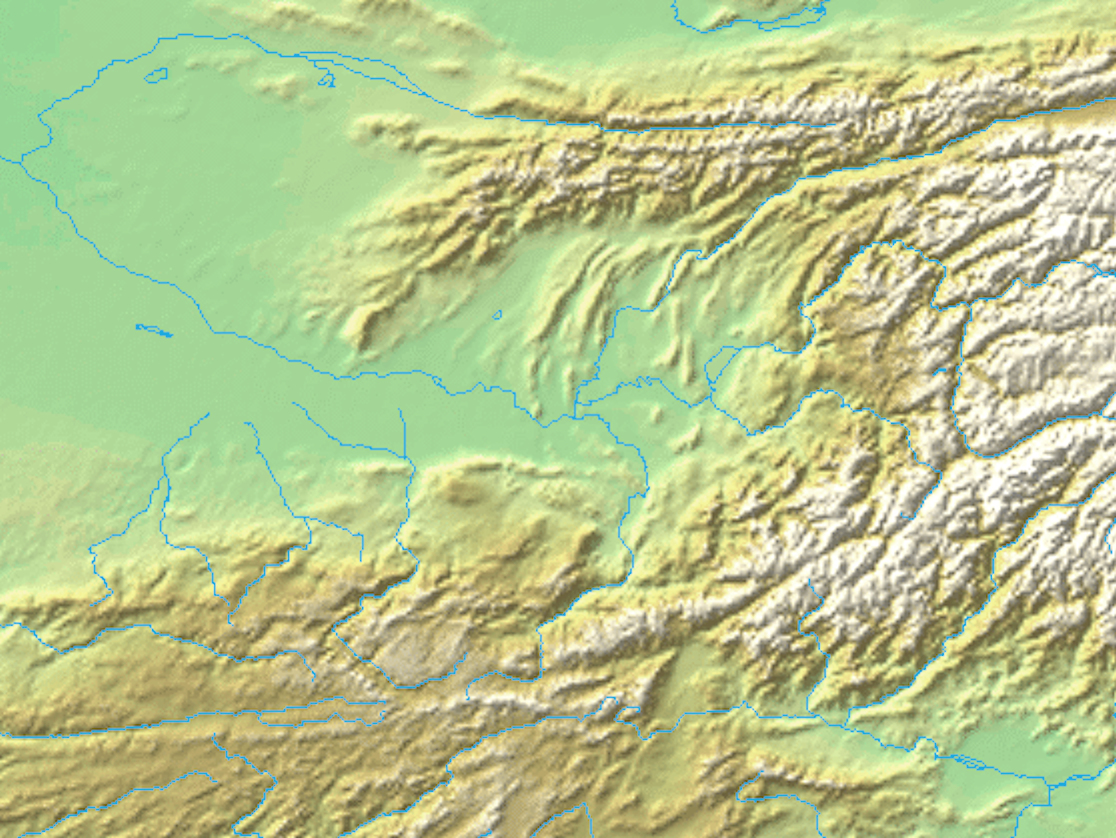
- Location within Afghanistan Location within Bactria Location within West and Central Asia Location within South Asia
- Coordinates: 34°38′22″N 66°53′52″E
- Country: Afghanistan
- Province: Bamyan Province
- Time zone: + 4.30

Darah-ye Rostam is a valley in central Afghanistan, located in Bamyan Province.

== See also ==
- Bamyan Province
- Valleys of Afghanistan
