= Maidan Valley, Afghanistan =

Maidan Valley درهٔ میدان Darah-ye Maidan
- Valley
- Soldiers marching out of the Maidan Valley to Argandeh

- Location within Afghanistan
- Coordinates: 34.38415°N 68.93736°E
- Country: Afghanistan
- Province: Wardak Province
- Time zone: + 4.30

The Maīdān ٰٰٰValley (Dari: درهٔ میدان) is a valley in Afghanistan located in Wardak Province, in the north-eastern part of the country.

== See also ==
- Valleys of Afghanistan
- Wardak Province
