= Foladi Valley =

Foladi Valley درهٔ فولادی
- Valley
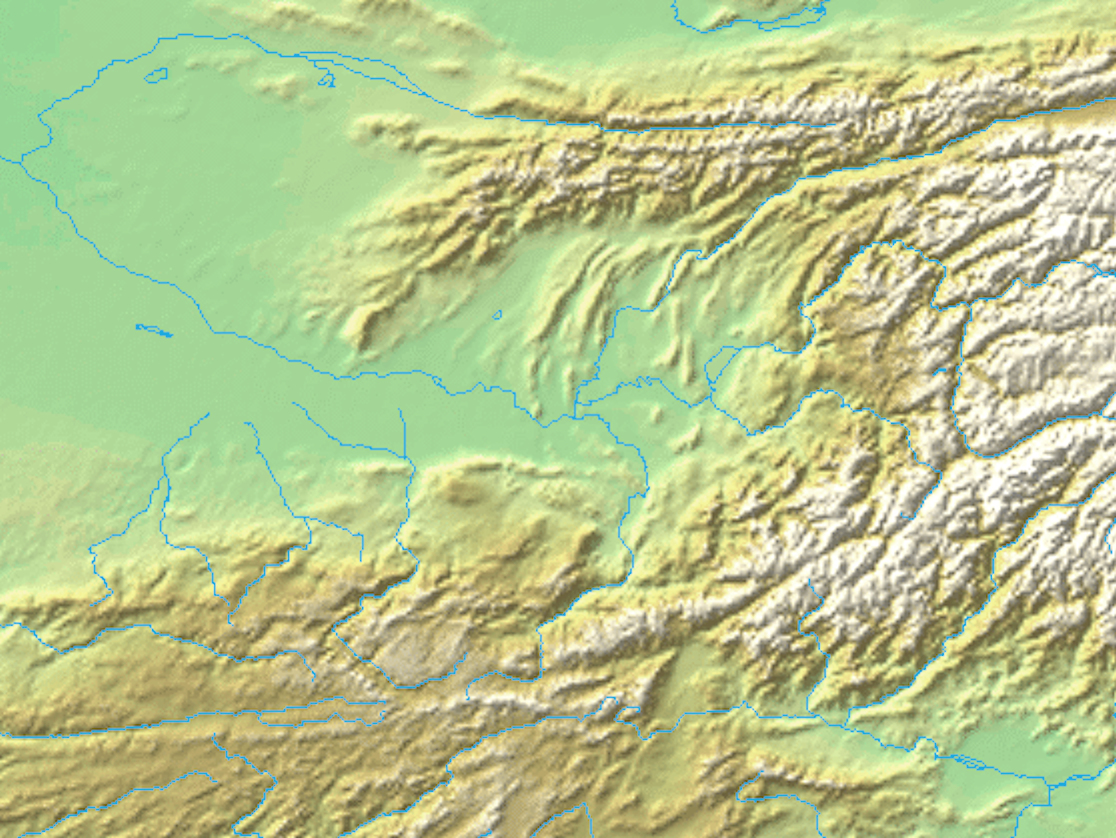
- Location within Afghanistan Location within Bactria Location within West and Central Asia Location within South Asia
- Coordinates: 34.82661°N 67.83534°E
- Country: Afghanistan
- Province: Bamyan province

Population
  - Ethnicities: Hazara people
- Time zone: + 4.30

Foladi Valley (Dari: درهٔ فولادی) is a valley in central Afghanistan, located in Bamyan province, 130 km west of Kabul province.

== Demographics ==
The Hazara people comprise the largest population of this area.

== See also ==
- Valleys of Afghanistan
