= Muhammad Musa (general) =

4th Commander-in-Chief, Pakistan Army (1908-1991)

Musa Khan HPk HJ HQA MBE
- موسیٰ خان
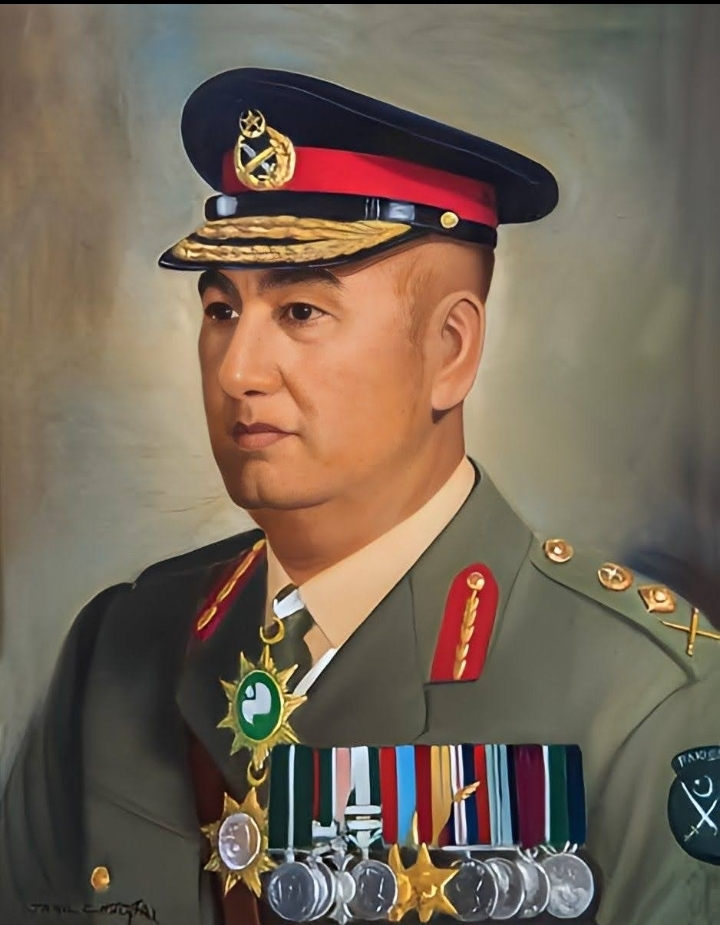
- Official military portrait

10th Governor of Balochistan
- In office 17 December 1985 – 12 March 1991
- President: General Zia-ul-Haq (1985-1988); Ghulam Ishaq Khan (1988-1991)
- Preceded by: K. K. Afridi
- Succeeded by: Gul Mohammad Khan Jogezai

4th Governor of West Pakistan
- In office 17 September 1966 – 20 March 1969
- Preceded by: Nawab of Kalabagh
- Succeeded by: Yusuf Haroon

4th Commander-in-Chief Pakistan Army
- In office 28 October 1958 – 17 September 1966
- Preceded by: General Ayub Khan
- Succeeded by: General Yahya Khan

Deputy Commander-in-Chief Pakistan Army
- In office 24 January 1958 – 21 May 1958

Personal details
- Born: Mohammad Musa Khan; 20 October 1908 Quetta, Baluchistan (Chief Commissioners Province)
- Died: 12 March 1991 (aged 82) Quetta, Balochistan, Pakistan
- Resting place: Imam Reza shrine, Mashhad, Iran
- Party: Independent; Pakistan Muslim League (1985–1991)
- Children: 6
- Parent: Yazdan Khan (father)
- Relatives: Sharbat Ali Changezi (son-in-law); Mansoor Ali Khan (grandson)
- Education: Indian Military Academy; Staff College, Quetta; Imperial Defence College

Military service
- Branch/service: British Indian Army (1926–1947); Pakistan Army (1947–1966)
- Years of service: 1926–1966
- Rank: General
- Unit: 4th Hazara Pioneers
- Commands: 14th Infantry Division (Pakistan); 8th Infantry Division (Pakistan); East Pakistan Rifles
- Battles/wars: See list: Waziristan campaign (1936–1939); World War II; North African campaign; Burma Campaign 1944–1945; India–Pakistan war of 1947; Bajaur Campaign; India–Pakistan war of 1965
- Awards: See list

Mohammad Musa Khan (Note: Urdu: محمد موسیٰ خان; Sometimes spelled Mohammed Musa Khan and Muhammad Musa Khan.) (20 December 1908 — 12 March 1991) was a Pakistani four-star general who served as the fourth Commander-in-Chief of the Pakistan Army from 1958 to 1966, for most of the regime of President Ayub Khan. He was then appointed Governor of West Pakistan by President Ayub and served from 1966 to 1969. He was appointed as the 10th Governor of Balochistan in 1985 and died in office in 1991.

Gaining commission as a Second lieutenant in the British Indian Army, Khan served with distinction in the Burma and North African campaigns as part of the Allied effort in World War II. Following the Partition of India in 1947, he opted for the Dominion of Pakistan, subsequently transferring his military service to the newly created Pakistan Army. He led a brigade against India during the First Kashmir War in 1947–1948, and eventually ascended the ranks to become the C-in-C of the Army after the 1958 coup d'état. Khan gained notability and public fame throughout Pakistan when he was in command of the Pakistan Army during the Second Kashmir War with India in 1965.

Khan retired shortly after the 1965 war and embarked on a career in national politics, after which he was appointed to serve as the Governor of West Pakistan, a position he held from 1966 to 1969. In 1985, he was appointed as the Governor of Balochistan and remained in office until his death in 1991.

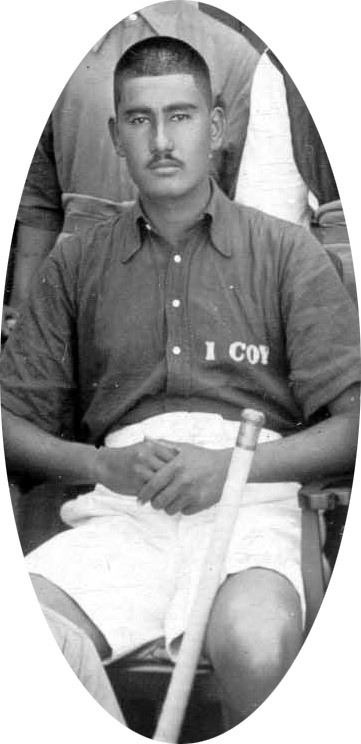
Musa Khan as Hockey player in 1930

== Early life ==
Musa was born on 20 October 1908 in Quetta, Baluchistan, British India to an ethnic Hazara family.

His family was sardar (lit. chief) of the Sang-e-Masha administration of Jaghori Hazara tribe and Musa was the eldest son of Yazdan Khan, who was the local Hazara tribal chief and himself a descendant of Sher Ali Khan, a Hazara elder from Jaghori, Ghazni.

== Personal life ==
Musa's younger brother, Mohammad Isa, was born in 1911 and died in September 1963. His third brother, Mohammad Ishaq, was born in 1914 and died in September 1974. Ishaq started his career as a Sub-Inspector Police and was promoted as an Inspector and resigned of Polce Service and started his own business.

Musa married his first cousin, Gulshah and they had six children. Their first child, Mohammad Ismail, was born in the spring of 1930 and died of pneumonia at eight months old. Their second son, Mohammad Ibrahim, was born in June 1932 and died in Karachi on 19 July 1969. Their eldest daughter, Uzra, was born in Quetta in May 1939 and married Sharbat Ali Changezi. Their second daughter, Maryam, was born in the winter of 1946 and the youngest, Zainab, was born in January 1949. Their son, Hassan, was the victim of a target killing in Karachi in 1998.

In his book, Musa wrote about his son Mohammad Ibrahim and said: "His demise was a great blow to the whole family. It took me and my wife very long to recover from it". Musa further wrote that Ibrahim used to look after his own agricultural land and was a good golf player, having won the Pakistan National Championship in 1962 and two other major tournaments in the country.

== Early military career ==
After his schooling, he was recruited to the British Indian Army as a Jawan in 1926 and eventually joined the 4th Hazara Pioneers after being promoted as the Naik – a non-commissioned officer in the British Indian Army. He was selected to join the Indian Military Academy (IMA) at Dehra Dun as a cadet in October 1932. The first batch of IMA, known as "The Pioneers", also produced India's first Field Marshal Sam Manekshaw, and Smith Dun, the future commander-in-chief of the Burmese Army.

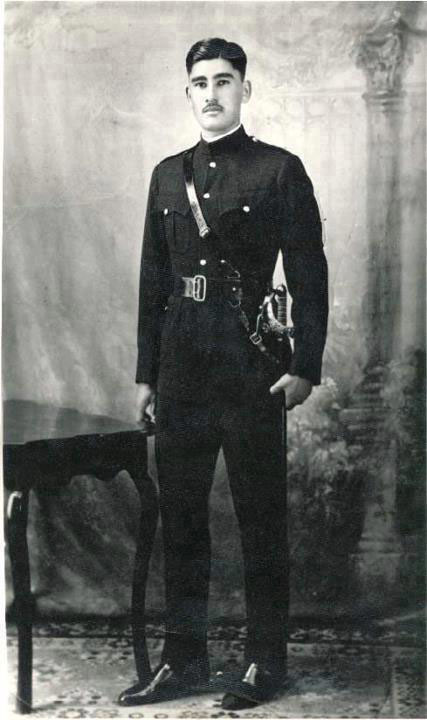
Musa while in the British Indian Army, c. 1935

In 1935, he was commissioned from the IMA, Dehradun following a two years and six months long military training. He was said to be an excellent sportsman and played hockey. In 1936, he was posted to the 6th Royal Battalion of the 13th Frontier Force Rifles as a Platoon Commander and saw actions in the violent Waziristan campaign in 1936 until 1938. He participated well in the World War II on the side of the United Kingdom and served well in the Burma Campaign and North African theatre as part of the Norfolk Regiment of the British Indian Army. In Middle East, he led the company and was listed in mentioned in despatches for "distinguished services in the Middle East during the period February to July 1941" and in the London Gazette 30 December 1941 as a Lieutenant and acting Major.

In 1942, his heroic action for valor won him the praise and was appointed as Member of the Order of the British Empire (MBE) for "gallant and distinguished services in the Middle East." In 1945, he was promoted as substantive captain and substantive major in 1946 and was serving with the Machine Gun battalion, 13th Frontier Force Rifles by October 1942.

After the partition of British India that followed the establishment of Pakistan in 1947, he opted for Pakistan and joined the Pakistan Army as a staff officer. In 1947 in the acting rank of Brigadier, he commanded the 103rd Infantry Brigade based in Sialkot brigade in Kashmir and served as commander of military units in the first war with India. In 1948, he went on to command the 52nd Infantry Brigade positioned in Quetta.

After the war in 1948, Musa studied and graduated from the Command and Staff College in Quetta and proceeded to attend the Imperial Defence College in United Kingdom prior to his graduation.

== Later military career ==
In 1950s, Musa's commanding assignments included his role as the Commandant of the East Pakistan Rifles, and also having served as GOC of 14th Infantry Division in Dhaka, East Pakistan, in 1951. In 1952, his last field assignment included his role as General Officer Commanding (GOC) of 8th Infantry Division positioned in Quetta before stationed at the GHQ. Later, he soon became the Chief of Staff of the Pakistan Army (then the commander-in-chief of the army's deputy) in the rank of major-general at the Army GHQ. His career progressed well in the army and he was ascended to Commander-in-Chief by President Ayub Khan in 1958 when the latter deposed President Iskander Mirza and appointed himself Field Marshal.

Musa's promotion to the four-star appointment came with controversy in the country as many saw that his appointment was based on "dependability rather than merit." His elevation also meant that he would supersede three of the most senior officers in the Pakistan Army: Gen Adam Khan, Gen Sher Ali Khan Pataudi, and Gen Latif Khan, all of whom were decorated Sandhurst graduates.

President Ayub delegated the military affairs to General Musa when heading the civic government. In 1960, he was appointed to serve as the President of the Pakistan Hockey Federation which he remained in the post until being retired in 1966. It was during his stint as president when the Hockey Team won its first Gold Medal against the Indian Hockey Team in the Summer Olympics in Rome in 1960.

== Bajaur Campaign ==
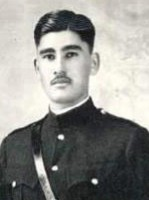
Another image of General Musa Khan while he was in the British Indian Army

In September 1960, Afghan Regular Troops disguised as local tribesmen started border incursions into the NWFP (now Khyber Pakhtunkhwa) province of Pakistan with the goal of starting a local rebellion to capture the Pashtun Inhabited Territory, under General Musa's leadership, Pakistani troops and Local Pashtun tribesmen along with Pakistan Airforce support pushed back the Afghans in 1961 and captured many Afghan soldiers.

== The 1965 War ==
In 1964, he became aware of covert operation studied by the Foreign ministry led by Foreign Minister Zulfikar Ali Bhutto, and presented views against the operation due to no linkage between the covert actions and the conventional backup. General Musa also had the support from President Ayub Khan on his views; however, the war began in 1965. General Musa did not order the Pakistan Army without the confirmation by President Ayub Khan despite Foreign Minister Bhutto's urging. After the Indian Army moved to the Rann of Kutch, General Musa ordered Army GHQ to respond to the Indian Army by moving the 12th Division. After reviewing the aerial view of the area and getting directions from President Ayub to make way for Maj General Yahya Khan, General Musa controversially relieved GOC Major-General Akhtar Hussain Malik and handed over the command of the 12th Division to Major-General Yahya Khan, which resulted in critical time delays of troops movements and eventual failure of the operation.

About the failure due to command change, General Musa justified his actions that he had not had time to select a commander or staff despite the authority given to him. He led and commanded the Pakistan Army in the largest tank battle, which earned him public fame. His strategy based on classical trench method supported by armory, artillery and airpower was tactically powerful and successful as it stopped the advancing Indian Army but politically unsuccessful due to the country being party of the peace treaty brokered by the USSR in 1965.

General Musa's military service is unique due to the fact that he had received two extensions as a Commander-in-chief from the period of 1958 until 1966. Upon his retirement, General Musa did not recommend Yahya Khan's nomination as Commander-in-chief and Yahya's name was not included in the list of nominations sent to President Ayub Khan; nonetheless, General Musa was succeeded by General Yahya Khan as Commander in Chief.

About the war with India in 1965, General Musa provided his views and testimonies in two books written on military history of Pakistan Army: first being the My Version: India-Pakistan War, 1965 and the second being the Jawan to General: Recollections of a Pakistani Soldier, the latter was mainly his biography.

== Retirement and Politics ==
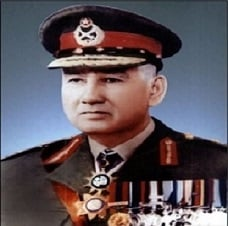
A portrait of Musa Khan taken near to his retirement

At the time of his retirement in 1966, General Musa was a famed and popular military figure which led President Ayub Khan to appoint him as the Governor of West Pakistan. News of the appointment was met with enthusiasm by the West Pakistani people. In 1967, he became Governor of West Pakistan until submitting his resignation on 2 March 1969 when General Yahya Khan imposed martial law to take over the presidency.

From 1969 to 1984, he settled in Karachi while receiving a military pension. In 1985, he became active in national politics on a Pakistan Muslim League platform led by Prime Minister M. K. Junejo. He was appointed as Governor of Balochistan by the President Zia-ul-Haq after the general elections held in 1985. After the general elections held in 1988, Governor Musa controversially dissolved the provincial assembly on the then-Chief Minister Zafarullah Khan Jamali's advice.

However, the Balochistan High Court restored the provincial assembly amid public condemnation of the Governor's move. The step towards dissolving the assembly was believed to have been taken with the consent of the President and Prime Minister. On 12 March 1991, General Musa died while in office and per accordance to his wishes, he was buried in Mashhad, Razavi Khorasan, Iran. In his honour, the provincial Balochistan government established a vocational school, the General Muhammad Musa Inter-College (GMMIC), in Quetta, Pakistan in 1987.

== Post-1965 war ==
About the war with India in 1965, General Musa provided his views and testimonies in two books written on military history of Pakistan Army: the first being My Version and the second being Jawan to General: Recollections of a Pakistani Soldier which was also his autobiography. General Mohammad Musa, who commanded the Army in the '65 war, gave his account of how the events unfolded at GHQ, the C-in-C and the Supreme Commander Field Marshal Ayub Khan surprising India on 6 September 1965 in My Version: India-Pakistan War, 1965

== Governor of Balochistan (1985-1991) ==
=== Death ===
Musa Khan died in Quetta on 12 March 1991.

== Awards and decorations ==
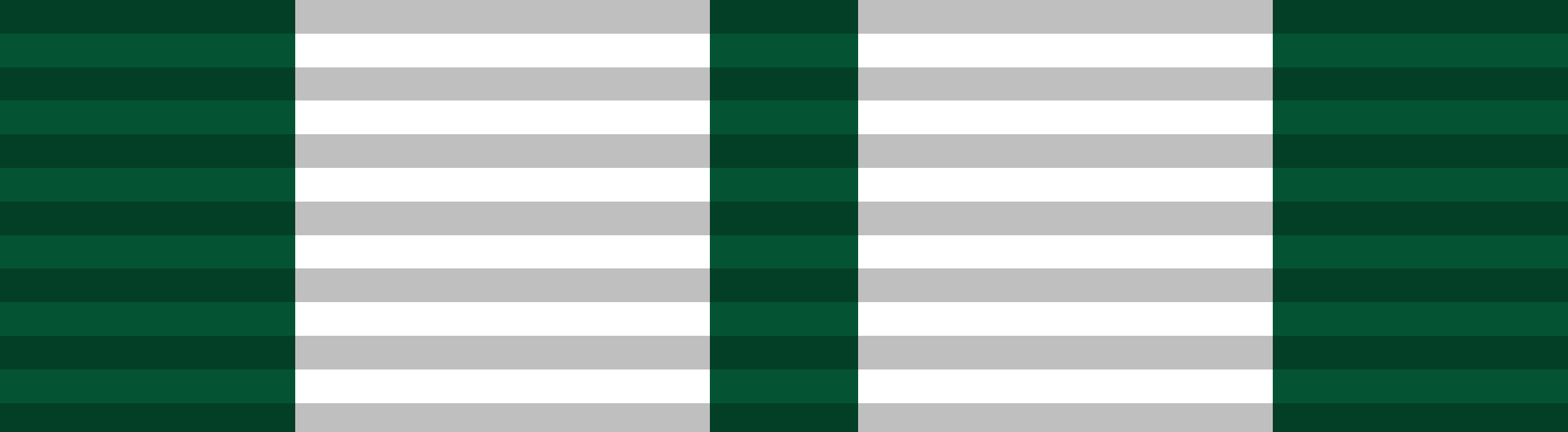
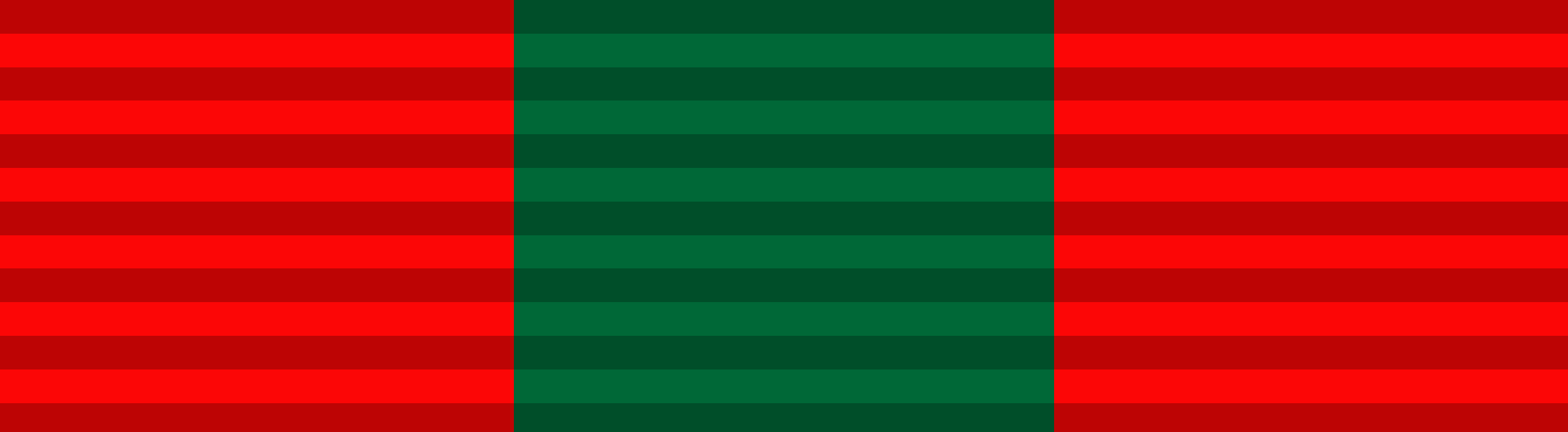
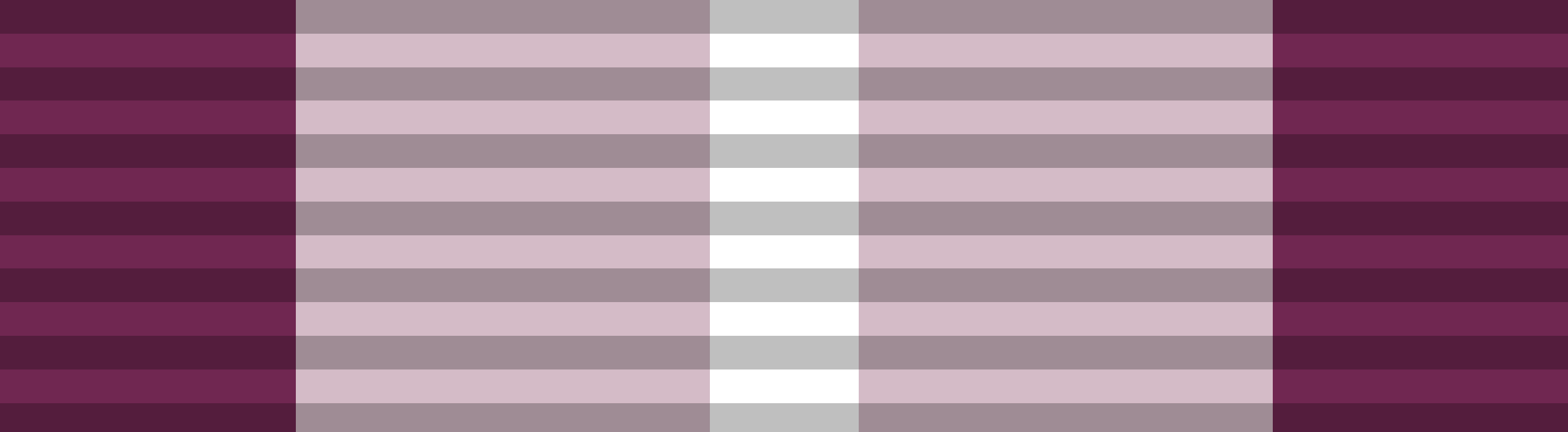

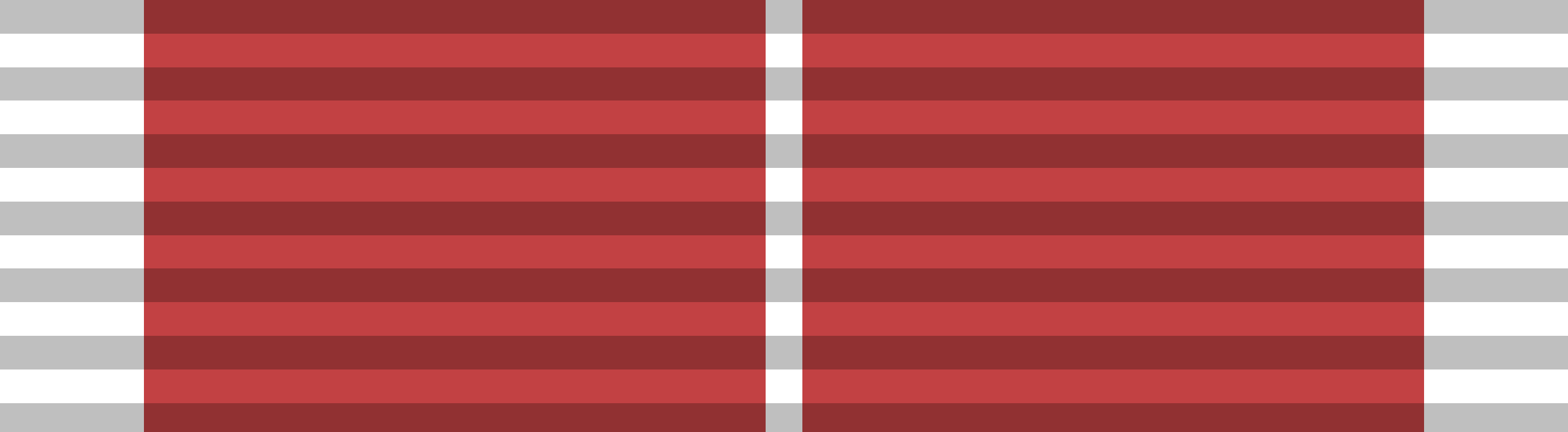

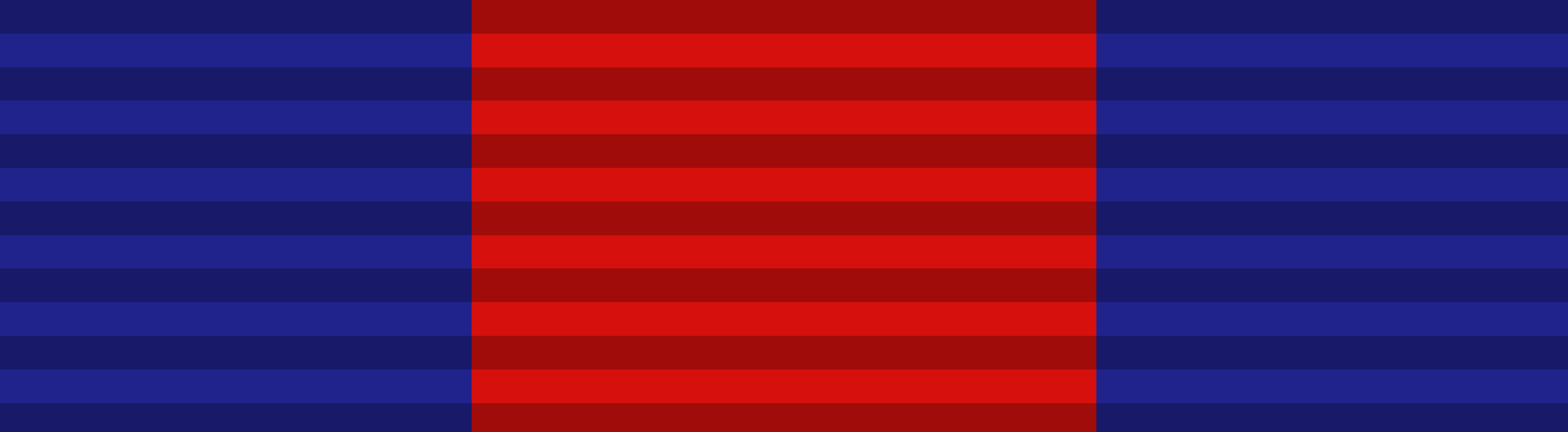

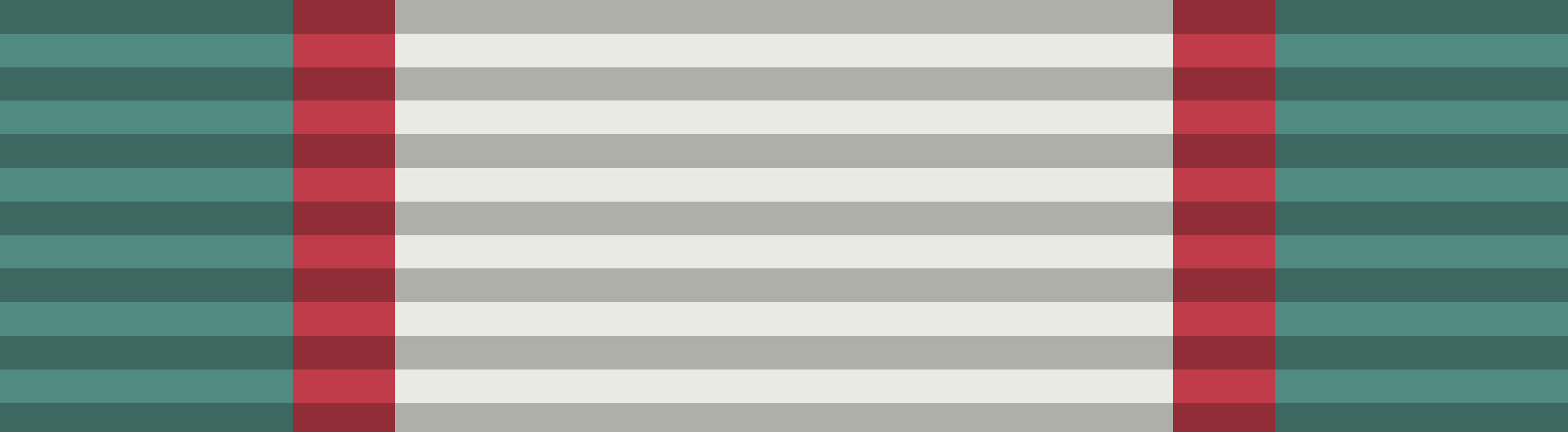

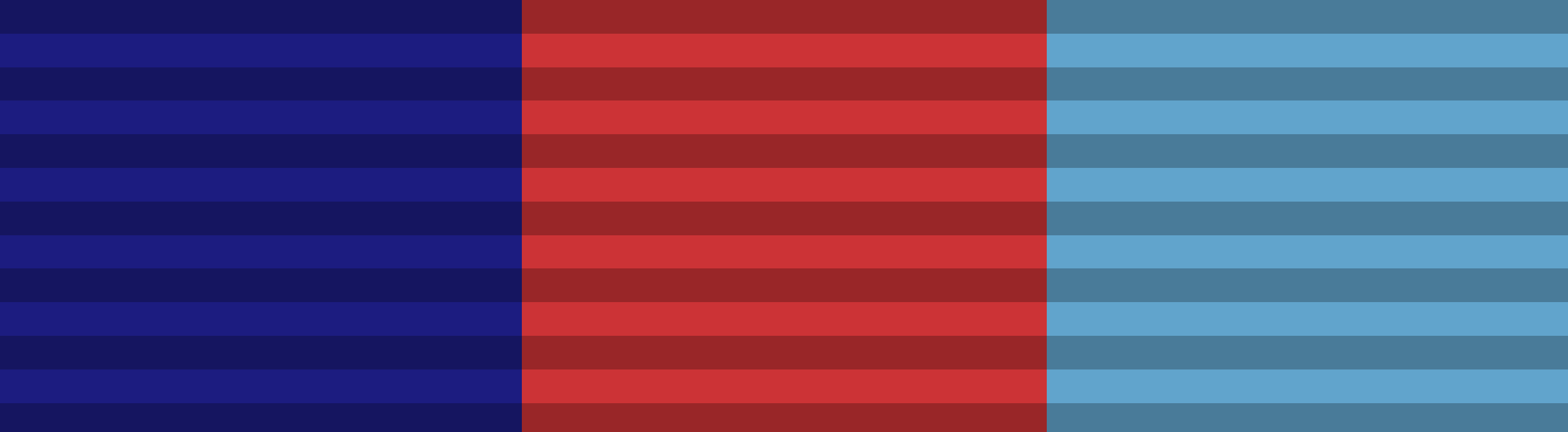

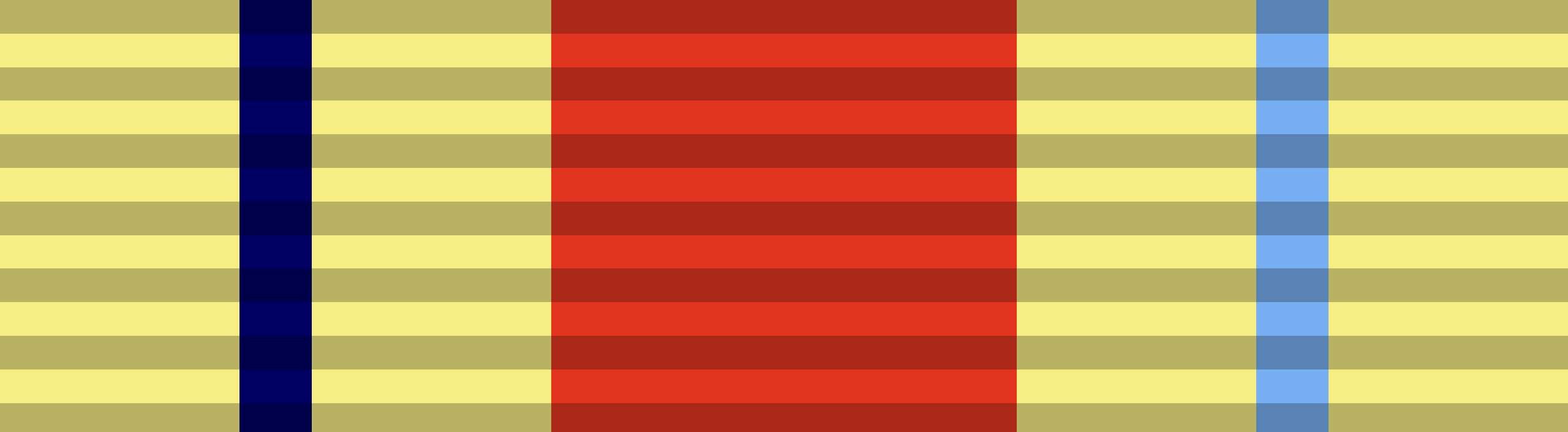

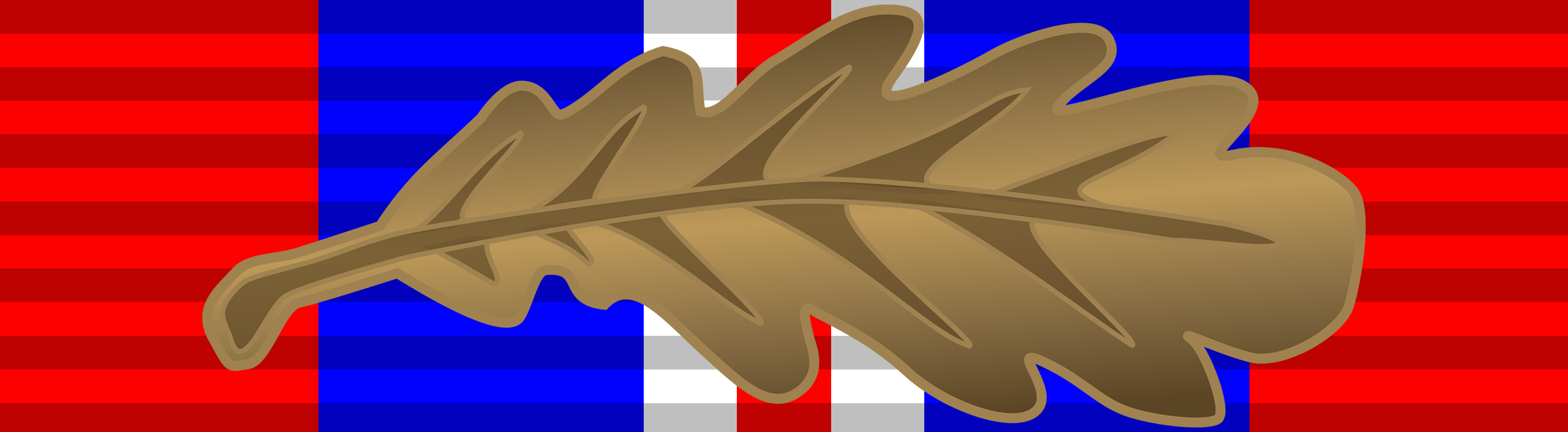

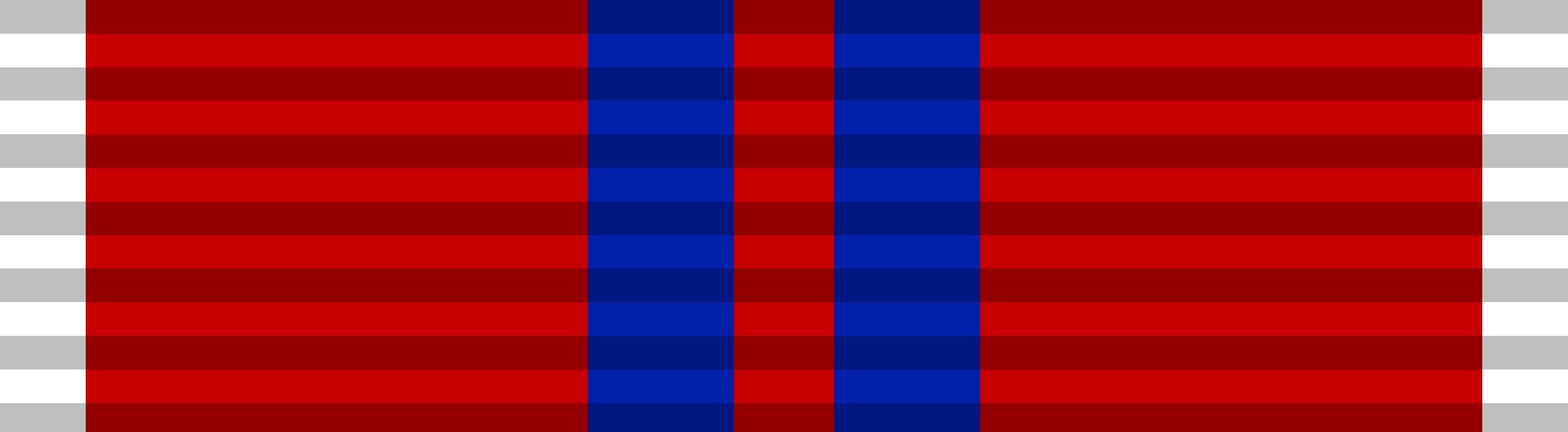

Hilal-e-Pakistan (Crescent of Pakistan) (HPk)	Hilal-i-Jurat (Crescent of Courage) 1965 War		Hilal-e-Quaid-e-Azam (HQA)
Sitara-e-Harb 1965 War (War Star 1965)	Tamgha-e-Jang 1965 War (War Medal 1965)	Pakistan Medal (Pakistan Tamgha) 1947	Tamgha-e-Qayam-e-Jamhuria (Republic Commemoration Medal) 1956
Member of the Order of the British Empire (MBE)	Indian Distinguished Service Medal (IDSM)	India General Service Medal (1936) (North West Frontier 1937–39 Clasp)	1939-1945 Star
Africa Star	War Medal 1939-1945 (with Mentioned in despatches oak leaf)	India Service Medal	Queen Elizabeth II Coronation Medal (1953)

== Notes ==
Military offices
Preceded by General Ayub Khan	Commander-in-Chief; Pakistan Army; 1958–1966	Succeeded by General Yahya Khan
Political offices
Preceded by Naseer Ahmed	President Pakistan Hockey Federation; 1960–1966	Succeeded by Nur Khan
Preceded by Amir Mohammad Khan	Governor of West Pakistan; 1966–1969	Succeeded by Yusuf Haroon
Preceded by Khushdil Khan	Governor of Balochistan; 1985–1991	Succeeded by Hazar Khan Khoso
