= Mohammad Sharif Saiidi =

Afghani poet (b.1970)

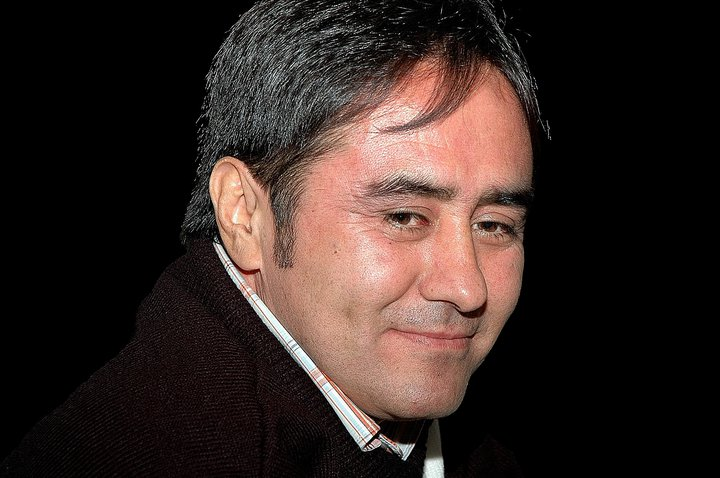
- Saiidi in 2009
- Born: 1970 (age 55–56); Jaghori, Ghazni, Islamic Republic of Afghanistan
- Occupation: Poet

Mohammad Sharif Saiidi (born 1970, Jaghoori) is a poet from Afghanistan.

== Early life and education ==
Saiidi lost his father at the age of four. He was a teenager when he emigrated alone from Afghanistan to Pakistan and then to Iran. In 1987 he entered Zulfiqar School in Isfahan and after four years of education he went on to study in Qom. There, he spent ten years studying Arabic language and Literature and Islamic Studies at the World Centre of Islamic Sciences, English Language in Baqer-al Ulum University and Political Science at the University of Mofeed. He left Iran in 2001 to settle in Sweden. In Sweden, he first started learning the Swedish language and re-studied his intermediate and high school education from scratch. He later obtained a degree in International Relations at the University of Gothenburg, and another degree in department of Oriental Studies in Persian Language and Literature (Persian, Swedish, English) at the University of Uppsala.

== Poetry ==
Saiidi began poetry in childhood. By staying in Iran, he gained a deeper acquaintance with literature, especially poetry. His first poems were published in 1989 in the Hablollah journal in Tehran. By sending the first poem to this journal, he obtained the permanent membership of the Poetry section of the journal and continued to publish his poems thereafter. At that time, Hablollah was the best Afghan refugee journal in Iran and had a great reputation and credibility.

It was during that time that Saiidi’s poem found its way to Iranian media. His first poems were published in poetry section of Etela’at Haftagi journal, which gave rise to his status and encouraged him to continue.

In those years he became familiar with the literary associations of Isfahan. He joined the Saba Poetry Association headed by Tabar Esfahani, which gave him the opportunity to know more about Ode and classic poetry. He left Saba because he found it limited to the classical poetry and joined the poetry recital sessions of Association of Poets of Isfahan in the library of Chaharbagh. In these sessions, more than a hundred classic and modern poets gathered for poetry readings and poetry critique. One of the Iranians’ famous Sonneteer, Saeeid Biyabanaki, emerged from such gatherings. Biyabanaki has commented about Sharif Saiidi’s presence in the Association of Poets of Isfahan that ‘when Saiidi goes starts reciting his poem on the microphone, all poets hold their breath’ (Farkhar Journal with a special issue for Mohammad Sharif Saiidi).

During his four-year stay in Isfahan, Saiidi compiled a collection of his poems. The collection was stolen in 1990 in a terminal in Tehran. The thief was a soldier who thought to have stolen a bag with valuables and money, which was in reality Saiidi’s first collection of poems. Some of poems of this collection had already been published in journals of Hablollah and Etela’at Haftegi.

In 1370, there was a weekly gathering of poetry recital at the Art Association of Qom, which was of great significance. In this programme, there were tens of renowned poets from Qom and Tehran and other cities. Ahmad Shahdadi, Sadeq Rahmani, Naser Faiz, professor Mohammad Ali Mujahedi and few other important figures criticized and assessed the poems. Each week, there was a guest poet. These guests included Ali Mousavi Garmaroudi, Mohammad Salmani and Aghasi. Mohammad Sharif Saiidi first introduced himself to this gathering through reciting his poems and later he established his position as a poetry critique.

In the same year, Muhammad Sharif Saeedi along with a group of young poets including Qanbar Ali Tabesh, Asif Javadi, Sarwar Taqwa, Mohsen Saeedi set up the programme of Literature and Poems of Afghan refugees in Qom. In these programmes sessions relating to poetry such as Prosody, Rhythm, Versification, Literary Techniques and introductory sessions on Poetry Criticism were arranged for other poets. Due to lack of space, these sessions used to take place in mosques or classrooms of World Centre of Islamic Sciences. Later, the Art Association of city of Qom provided the Afghan poets and writers with a room to meet twice a week to hold poetry and story writing related sessions. Since then, Mohammad Sharif Saiidi became in charge of managing this programme in Qom. Various prestigious poets took part in this programme. Many poets including Qanbar Ali Tabesh, professor Sayed Movahed Balkhi, Mohsen Saeedi, Asef Javadi, Salman Ali Zaki, Ali Madad Rezvani, and ladies including Shokria Erfani, Zahra Zahedi, Hakima Arefi recited their poems and criticized one another’s poetry. These sessions were held on Thursdays and carried the title of ‘Bluer than Thursdays’.

In the programme of ‘Bluer than Thursdays’, there was a session on Sonnets of Bidel. Saeedi was responsible for managing this programme but other poets including but not excluding to professor Movahed Balkhi, Sayed Fazel Mahjoob and Mohsen Saiidi were involved in analyzing the sonnets of Bidel. These sessions were recorded by the Art Association of City of Qom to be used by the Iranian poets of this association as many Iranian poets had difficulty in understanding the language, thoughts and imagination of Bidel.

In 1373, the Tales and Poetry Forum of city of Qom invited Sharif Saiidi for collaboration. He began working as a poetry critique of this forum. This collaboration continued until 8 years when he left Iran for Sweden. In this forum there were several sessions a week for poetry critique and many young poets welcomed the sessions. Amongst the young poets who started poetry in this forum and later had active presence in the forum, one can name: Najmeh Zare, Shirin Khosravi, Zahra Rasoul Zadeh, Shokria Erfani, Zahra Zahedi, Hakima Arefi, Salman Ali Zaki, Ali Madad Rezvani, Sayed Reza Jafari, Taqi Akbari, etc. During the 8 years of teaching in this forum, around 800 students took lessons on poetry critique and story writing and graduated successfully. Apart from poetry critique, Sharif Saiidi also taught Prosody, Versification and matters related to poetry.

One of the most important programmes of this forum was the literary programme of Poets of Poetry Council of Qom broadcast in the Iranian TV. In this programme, around 50 top student poets were selected and sent to Tehran under supervision of Sharif Saiidi. The programme was held and broadcast on a weekly basis. The programme raised profiles of many young poets in the forum.

Mohammad Sharif Saeedi first gained fame in Qom. Later, many Iranian poets throughout Iran welcomed his particular poems. He has been repeatedly invited to many poetry congresses in cities of Tehran, Mashad, Shiraz, Isfahan, Kashan, Tabriz, Yazd, Kerman, Sabzevaran, Saveh, Sanandaj, Qazvin, Khomeini Shahr, Mazandaran. These congresses welcomed the contemporary poetries. For example, one can mention the poetry congress in Khomeini Shahr that was held for 12 years consequently and had more than 10,000 poet audiences. Every year and for three days, the city of Isfahan turned into a city of poetry. It goes without saying that the poetry congress was accompanied with music and songs that added to the glory of the congress.

Apart from studying in Qom, Saiidi had wide range of literary activities. He was the chief editor of the first literary and artistic bi-weekly called Golbang. This bi-weekly was published every two weeks from 1992 to 2001. This bi-weekly dealt with the literary and artistic topics. Poems, stories, photographs, reports, travelogues, poetry criticism, story criticism were amongst the permanent topics of the journal. Besides these subjects, he also dealt with artistic matters such as calligraphy, singing, music, etc. Among those who were introduced to literary circles through this bi-weekly one can mention the poet Mohammad Shams Jafari and the storywriter Batool Sayed Haidari and the filmmaker and photographer Puya Alami. After Saiidi’s migration to Sweden, the journal continued for one more year with the chief editor Javad Khavari and then went to an end.

Saeedi was a member of Cultural Center of Afghan writers in exile. In this centre, he cooperated with the journals of Siraj and Dor-e Dari. According to many cultural experts and figures and as Rahnaward Zaryab commented: Dore-e Dari is the best Persian journal in the field of literature and art. This journal had a special status amongst the literary and artistic circles. Sharif Saiidi was a member of editorial board as well as managing poetry and translation section of the journal. Several articles of Saiidi on various topics have been published in this journal. ‘Modernism and the obstacles of Afghanistan poetry’ was amongst the most influential articles of Saiidi. He has also translated and published various stories and poems from English to Persian in Dor-e Dari.

Saiidi was the responsible person in literature section of magazine "Solidarity" and was also the editor of the magazine. He published poetry, stories and travelogues in this weekly journal. His multi-part travelogue of his trip to Mazar-e-Sharif and Bamiyan was considered as one of the most read texts of the journal.

Saiidi has also collaborated with the literature section of scientific journal of ‘Siraj’, which is publication of Cultural Centre of Writers of Afghanistan in Qom.

Amongst Saiidi’s works one can mention the modification of the book ‘Naqd’e Bidel’ i.e. critique of Bidel written by Salahuddin Saljoughi. Saiidi prepared this book for the Ehsani Publications in Qom in 1995 but the book did not get published as another publication managed to publish it quicker than Ehsani Publication and that limited the market for the book.

The literary and academic community welcomed Saeedi’s poems. For example, his poems were cited in the textbooks of the Kabul University and Isfahan University. Many thesis and dissertation were dedicated to analysis of his poems and prose in Afghanistan universities. Ms. Somaye Arab Nezhad in Kashan University wrote her PhD thesis on sonnets of Saeedi. Dr. Zaher Fayez’s PhD research was about Saeedi and three other poets’ poems in Isfahan University.

In Iran, Saiidi has been involved in teaching literature and journalism. In Sweden, he has been engaged with interpreting and translation centers of the Swedish Ministry of Defense, cooperation with the international Swedish Radio and finally with Swedish schools in teaching mother tongue and tuition.

== Articles about Saiidi ==
People who have written about books or poetry of Saeedi include:

- Kazem Kazemi
- Latif Nazemi
- Sakhidad Hatef
- Mohammad Vaezi
- Mahmoud Jafari
- Dr. Mohammad Jafar Yahaghi
- Dr. Sarwar Mowla'ii
- Abutaleb Mozaffari
- Syed Zia Ghasemi
- Seyed Reza Mohammadi
- Mir Hossein Mahdavi
- Wasef Bakhtari
- Wali Parkhash Ahmadi
- Ganbar Ali Tabesh
- Sarv Rasa Rafi-Zadeh
- Saeed Biabanaki
- Dr. Ismail Amini
- Dr. Ali Khairi
- Abdul Khaliq Toronto
- Kaveh Ahang
- Sayed Nader Ahmadi
- Khaleda Forough
- Humaira Nekhat Dastgir Zada
- Parto Naderi
- Abdul Hadi Ayoubi
- Saboorollah Sia Sang
- Somaye Arab Zadeh
- Mohammad Hossein Hashemi
- Dr. Hafizillah Shariati
- Hamid Reza Shekar Sari
- Dr. Esmat Esmaili
- Dr. Mahmoud Hassan Abadi
- Dr. Yousof Bina

== Books by Saiidi ==
Saiidi translated poetry and stories from English and Swedish to Persian. Saeedi’s translations have been published in journals of Dor-e Dari, Khate Sevom, Revayat and also in Saiidi’s weblog and Facebook account. A collection of stories of Willy Kyrklund, the Swedish writer and philosopher, have been translated by Saiidi and is ready for publication.

The following poetry collection of Saiidi have been published:

1. ‘Waqti Kaboutar Nist’ (When there is no dove), Qom-Iran, 1995.
2. Selection of contemporary literature, No 35, Neyestanan Publication, 2002, ISBN 964-6882-80-3
3. ‘Tabar wa Bagh’e Gol’e Sorkh’ (Axes and rose garden) (1 and 2 selected poems by contemporary poets) Afghanistan Writers Cultural Center Press
4. ‘Mah’e Hezar Pareh’ (a thousand pieces moon), 2003, Erfan Publication, Tehran
5. ‘Safar’e Ahooha’ (Trip of Gazelles) 2009, Teka Publication, Tehran
6. ‘ Qoflhaye Bozorg’ (large locks) 2009, Erfan Publications, Tehran
7. ‘Alef, Lam, Mim, Dal’, 2012, Afghanistan Pen Association Press, Kabul.
8. ‘Zaghe Sefid’ (White Crow), 2012 Tak Publication, Kabul.
9. ‘Khabe Amoudi’ (Vertical Sleeping), 2013, Tak Publication, Kabul, ISBN 978-9936-600-35-5
10. ‘Ahesta Raftan’e Chaqoo’ (the Slow walk of knife) 2014, Erfan Publication, Tehran, ISBN 978-600-6580-61-6
11. ‘Hazara Badamha’, 2013, Iran Poet Association Press, Tehran

Books to be published:

1. Jaye Baran Khali’ (Rain is missing)
2. ‘Tofange Ernest Hemmingway’, (Ernest Hemingway’s Rifle)
3. ‘Zar Sang’, (Golden Stone)
4. ‘Hariq’e Lale’ (The fire of Tulip), (a review of sonnets of Wasef Bakhtari)
5. Collection of Short Stories

== Awards and recognition ==
Saiidi received a poetry scholarship from the Swedish Writers Foundation in 2013 for 50,000 Swedish Krone, and in 2014 for 70,000 Swedish Krone.

Saeedi has been the judge of Persian poetry in international literary festivals. He was a judge in the competition and festival of Poetry Without Borders at Uppsala in Sweden as well as judge in Qand’e Parsi festival and competition of poetry and story writing in Tehran.
