= Shah Gul Rezai =

Afghan politician

Shah Gul Rezai شاه گل رضایی

Personal details
- Born: Shah Gul Afghanistan
- Occupation: legislator
- Ethnicity: Hazara

Shah Gul Rezai (Dari: شاه گل رضایی) (born 1979) was elected to represent Ghazni Province in Afghanistan's Wolesi Jirga, the lower house of its National Legislature, in 2005. She is a member of the Hazara ethnic group and has been a human rights activist with 16 years of legislative experience in the Afghanistan parliament from 2005 to 2021. She was a teacher from the Jaghori district.

== See also ==
- List of Hazara people
