= Reham Khan =

British journalist of Pakistani descent

Reham Khan ریحام خان

Senior Vice-President of Pakistan Republic Party
- Incumbent
- Assumed office 15 July 2025
- Patron-in-Chief: Fawad Chaudhry; Farrukh Habib (Deputy)

Personal details
- Born: Reham Nayyar Khan; 3 April 1973 (age 53) Ajdabiya, Libya
- Citizenship: British, Pakistani
- Spouse(s): Ejaz Rehman (m. 1993; div. 2005) Imran Khan (m. 2015; div. 2015) Mirza Bilal (m. 2022)
- Children: 3
- Parent: Nayyar Ramzan (father)
- Relatives: Abdul Hakeem Khan (uncle)
- Education: Jinnah College for Women
- Occupation: Journalist
- Website: www.rehamkhanofficial.com

Reham Nayyar Khan (Urdu: ریحام نیئر خان; born 3 April 1973) is a British-Pakistani journalist, author, and filmmaker originally from Baffa, Khyber Pakhtunkhwa, Pakistan. She is a former wife of Imran Khan, who later became prime minister of Pakistan in 2018. The publication of her memoir shortly before the 2018 Pakistani general election led to claims that it was intended to damage Imran Khan's electoral prospects.

She launched the Pakistan Republic Party in July 2025, aiming to end dynastic politics in Pakistan.

== Early life and education ==
Reham was born to Nayyar Ramzan, a Pakistani physician. She is part of the Lughmani Sarkheli clan, a sub-clan of the Swati ethnic group. She is fluent in four languages: English, Urdu, Pashto and her ancestral Hindko.

Her family hails from the town of Baffa, lying 15 km west of Mansehra in Khyber Pakhtunkhwa province. Her parents moved to Libya in the late 1960s, where Reham was born in Ajdabiya in 1973. She has one sister and one brother. Khan is the niece of Abdul Hakeem Khan, a former governor of the Khyber-Pakhtunkhwa province and former chief justice of Peshawar High Court. One of her grandfathers, Dr. Sher Bahadur Khan Panni authored Tarīkh-i-Hazārā in 1969.

Reham has a bachelor's degree in education from Jinnah College for Women, Peshawar.

== Media career ==
=== United Kingdom ===
==== Host ====
Reham started her career in 2006 hosting shows on Legal TV. In 2007, she began presenting for Sunshine Radio Hereford and Worcester. In 2008, Khan joined the BBC as a weather presenter.

=== Pakistan ===
==== Host ====
In 2013, Khan came to Pakistan and joined Pakistani news channel News One. She later joined Aaj TV. In 2014, following a brief stint at PTV, she joined Dawn News presenting the current affairs show In Focus. Following a brief hiatus in early 2015, she resumed her work with a new show on Dawn. The Reham Khan Show, a programme celebrating Pakistani heroes, debuted in May 2015. In December 2015, she started a new talk show by the name of Tabdeeli on Neo TV. Tabdeeli ("change") is also a political slogan of Imran Khan, her former husband. Reham left Neo TV in June 2016.

==== Production ====
Reham produced the Pakistani film Janaan, a romantic comedy set in Swat, which premiered on the occasion of Eid ul Adha on 13 September 2016.

== Political career ==
Khan launched the Pakistan Republic Party on 15 July 2025, aiming to represent marginalized groups and end dynastic politics. Announcing the launch at the Karachi Press Club, she vowed to pursue legal reforms and described the launch of the party as a national mission.

== Personal life ==
Khan has been married three times. Her first marriage was to Ejaz Rehman, her first cousin and a British psychiatrist, when she was 19. Following their divorce, Khan began working as a broadcast journalist. She has three children who have lived with her since the divorce. Her second marriage was to Imran Khan, who confirmed he had married Reham in a secret ceremony on 6 January 2015. The couple divorced on 30 October 2015. She married Mirza Bilal on 23 December 2022.

On 2 January 2022, Khan revealed on Twitter that she had narrowly escaped a gun attack in Islamabad when returning home from her nephew's wedding. She said her car was shot at and two men on a motorcycle held the vehicle at gunpoint.

== Bibliography ==
- Khan, Reham (2018). Reham Khan. SK Publications. ISBN 978-1-9164-1521-8.
