= Qyaq =

Qyaq قیاق
- Valley
- Location in Afghanistan
- Coordinates: 33.60806°N 68.23228°E
- Country: Afghanistan
- Province: Ghazni
- District: Jaghatu
- Time zone: + 4.30

Qyaq also spelt Qeyaq (Dari: قياق) is a residential area in Afghanistan, located in the Jaghatu District of Ghazni Province, in central part of the country.

== Demographics ==
Qyaq is mostly inhabited by Hazara people.
