= Jaghori District =

Jaghori جاغوری
- District
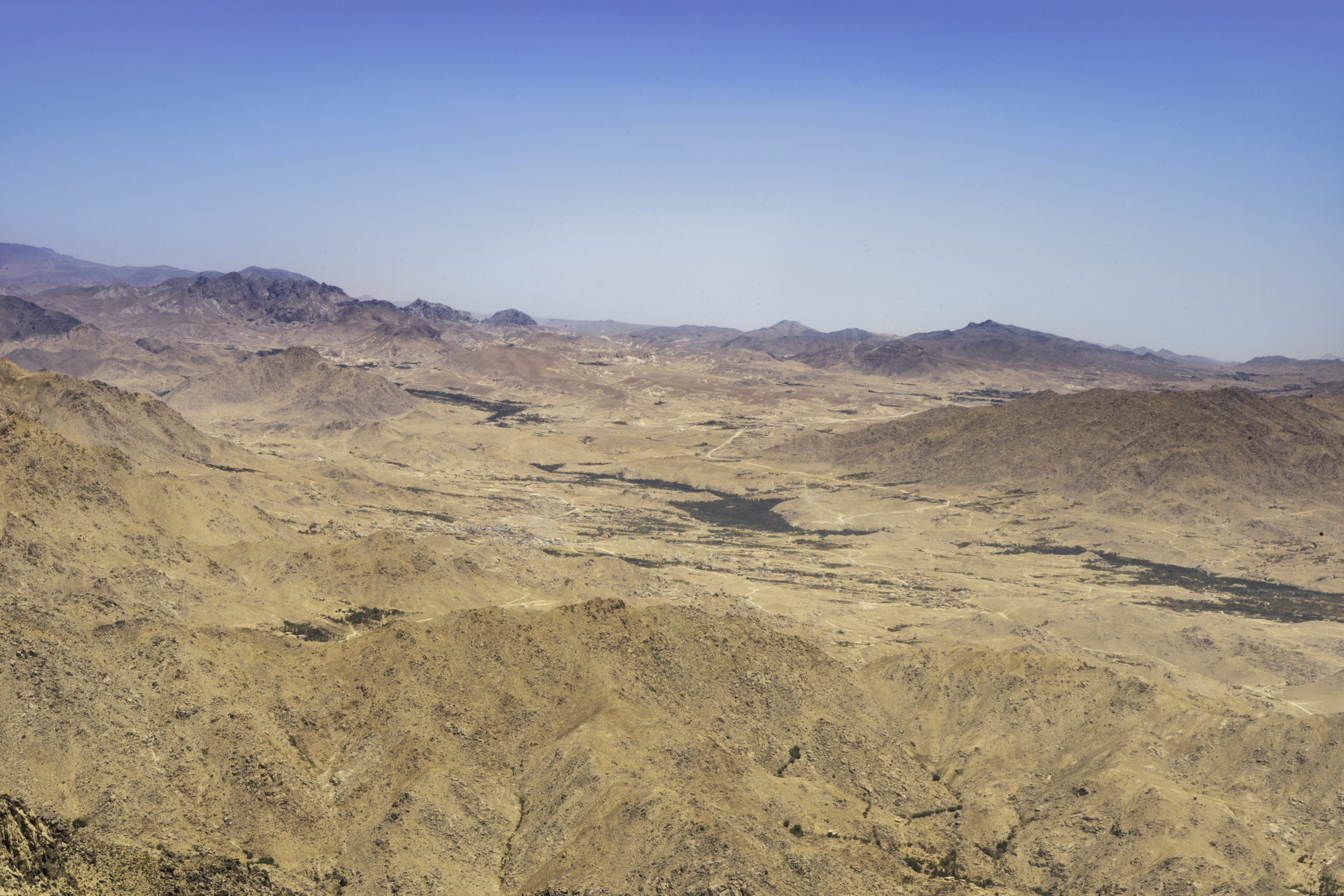
- View of Sang-e-Masha (Central Jaghori) from Badasiya Mountain,
- Motto: Dari: جاغوری سرزمین آرزوها
- Location in Afghanistan
- Coordinates: 33°7′59″N 67°27′13″E
- Country: Afghanistan
- Province: Ghazni
- Capital: Sang-e-Masha

Area
  - Total: 3,000 km^{2} (1,200 sq mi)
  - Water: 0 km^{2} (0 sq mi)
- Elevation: 4,022 m (13,196 ft)

Population (2025)
  - Total: 217,483
  - Density: 72/km^{2} (190/sq mi)
- Time zone: UTC+04:30 (Afghanistan Time)

Jaghori (Dari: جاغوری) is one of the 19 districts of Ghazni Province in central Afghanistan. It has an estimated population of 217,483 people. Most of them are ethnic Hazaras involved in agriculture. Others are traders, shop owners, and construction workers. Sang-e-Masha serves as the district's business and administrative centre. Other major marketplaces are in Anguri and Ghojor.

Occupying 1,855 km^{2} (716 sq mi), Jaghori is one of the mountainous and remote districts of Ghazni Province. It sits in the highlands in the southern fringes of the historical Hazarajat region, in the upper Arghandab River valley. The district has a growing number of dams and reservoirs, which are slowly attracting tourists from not only Ghazni but also other provinces.

Climate of Jaghori is generally arid continental, with cold and snowy winters, and hot summers with temperatures rising between 25 °C (77 °F) to 38 °C (100 °F).

== History ==
The area has witnessed countless military invasions for the past 5,000 years. It was once a place where Buddhism flourished followed by Islam. It became an important part of the Ghaznavid Empire. During the First Anglo-Afghan War, the invading British Indian forces began supporting the locals against the Barakzai dynasty. In 1949 Malistan District was separated from Jaghori.

During the Soviet Occupation, Maoist resistance groups were particularly active. After Harakat lost in Qarabagh District, Ghazni in 1985 to Nasr, the political organizations united to force out Hezbi Islami from the districts of Jaghori and Malistan. However, there were only sporadic clashes here and the Democratic Republic of Afghanistan lacked interest in Jaghori. In 1997 the area was put under food blockade by the Taliban, leaving the locals, including those in Malistan, on the brink of starvation. The elders of Jaghori avoided a war with the Taliban by forming a shura and then negotiating with the Taliban leaders in Kandahar, Kabul, and Ghazni.

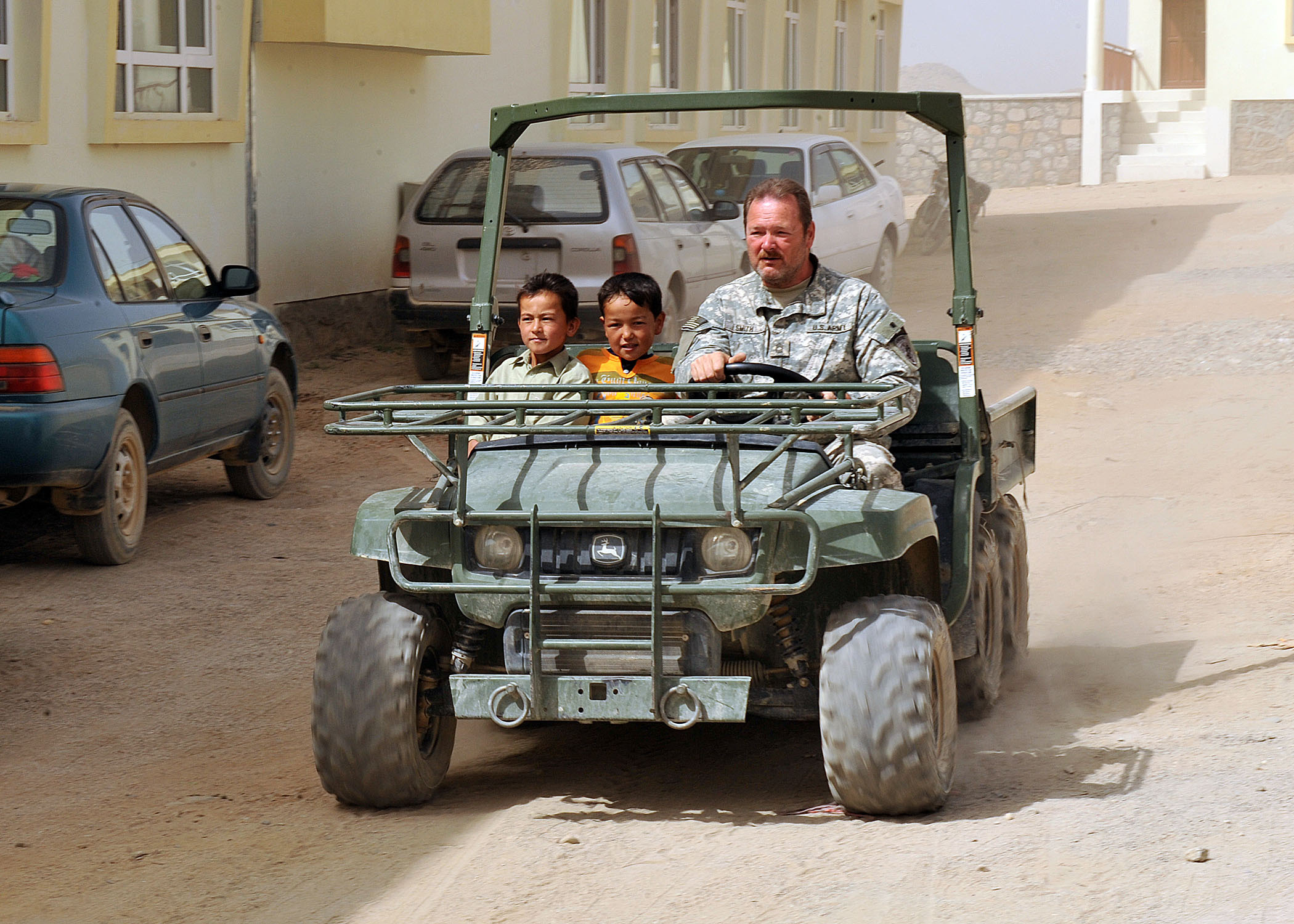
A U.S. soldier giving ride to local Afghan children in 2010

During NATO's occupation in the early 20th century, the area remained in Taliban control. The major issues have been about use of land and water.

Many residents of Jaghori fled the area during the decades of war and drought. Some began returning since the early 2000s. From 2002 to 2008 approximately 12,348 expatriates returned to Jaghori.

Districts of Ghazni have been inaccessible except through Taliban territory, where the road has been reportedly mined and in some areas vehicles have been banned. According to some reports, the road from Qarabagh District to Jaghouri, passing through Malistan was under particular threat, with kidnappings and theft. There were also concerns that certain militants would use the Kuchis to exert their influence in the region. General Habibullah Bashi had check posts between Rasna, Gilan connecting Zeba, and Gardo Hotqul.

In 2012, a Bactrian inscription was discovered on a rock, dated to around 757 CE (140 AH), it commemorates the defeat of an "Indian prince" by a local prince named Frum Kesar, likely the grandson of a king whose reign ended in 745 CE. The ruling family's tamgha, or dynastic symbol, appears twice below the text.

In November 2018 Taliban-led forces launched a major offensive in Jaghori, which resulted in thousands of locals fleeing the area for safety elsewhere, particularly in Dashte Barchi in Kabul. Heavy fighting was reported around the village of Hotqul. It was claimed that 100s of militants attacked General Bashi's security posts bordering Hotqul and Rasna Gilan. General Bashi was killed along with his family members. The fighting continued for over two weeks in which around seventy more people died. According to locals, about 1,000 Taliban-led fighters were deployed in southern Jaghori. It was said that the people of Jaghori resisted and repelled the Taliban forces without any assistance from Ashraf Ghani's administration. Despite all of that, the Taliban captured the district on 15 August 2021, as part of their offensive. Since then no attacks or military activities have been reported.

== Drought ==
The area has been particularly affected by drought. As a result, the residents began building check dams throughout the district.

== Notable people ==
- Mohammad Sharif Saiidi, poet
- Muhammad al-Fayadh, Shia jurist
- Akram Yari
- Yazdan Khan
- Musa Khan
- Khodadad Erfani
- Sima Samar
- Shah Gul Rezai
- Abuzar Ghaznawi

== See also ==
- Districts of Afghanistan
- Jaghori (Hazara tribe)
