= Shaki, Ghazni =

Shaki شاکی
- Location within Afghanistan
- Coordinates: 33.46153°N 68.18222°E
- Country: Afghanistan
- Province: Ghazni
- District: Jaghatu

Population
  - Ethnicities: Hazara people

Shaki (Dari: شاکی) is a residential area in Afghanistan, located in Jaghatu district of Ghazni province.

== Demographics ==
This area is inhabited by ethnic Hazaras.
