= Anguri =

Anguri انگوری
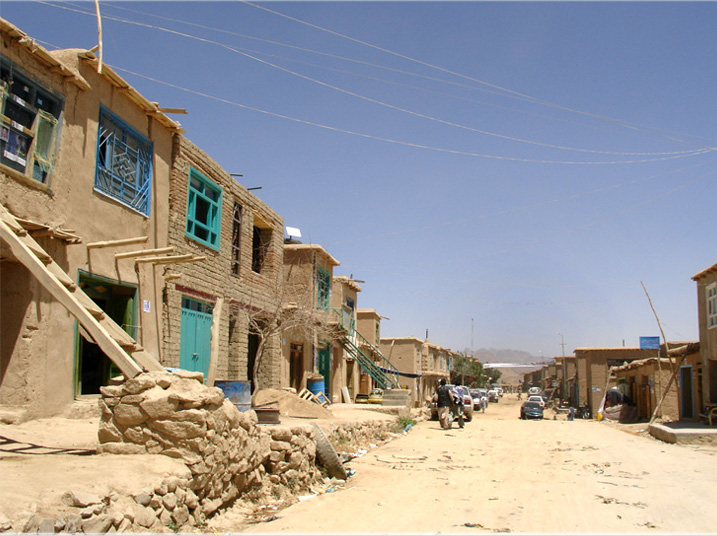
- A street in Anguri, 2006

- Location in Afghanistan
- Coordinates: 32°58′06″N 67°32′53″E
- County: Afghanistan
- Province: Ghazni
- District: Jaghori
- Time zone: UTC+04:30 (Afghanistan Time)

Anguri (Dari: انگورى), also spelled as Angoori or Angori, is a town in Jaghori District of Ghazni Province in south-central Afghanistan. Majority of its residents are ethnic Hazaras. The center of the town serves as one of the major market places for the population of Jaghori. It also serves as a bus terminal for travelers between Jaghori and Dashte Barchi in Kabul.

== Geography ==
Anguri is connected by gravel road with Sang-e-Shanda and Baderzar to the north, and Dawod Zeerak to the north east and Bilaw to the east. The road is expected to be asphalted in the near future. Hutqol is located west of Anguri. The Alghizar valley is in the south which reaches down to Gelan province.

== Education ==
There are three public high schools in Anguri (Hutqul-Anguri High School ليسه حتقول و انگوري, Anguri Girls High School لیسه نسوان انگوری, Ustad Fazil High School لیسه استاد فاضل), one private high school (Keyan Private High School لیسه خصوصی کیان) and Nigina Educational Center.

== See also ==
- Places in Afghanistan
