= Gulbawri =

Gulbawri گُلبَوری
- Location in Afghanistan
- Coordinates: 33.557222°N 68.239444°E
- Country: Afghanistan
- Province: Ghazni
- District: Jaghatu
- Ethnicities: Hazara people
- Elevation: 2,725 m (8,940 ft)
- Time zone: + 4.30

Gulbawri (Dari: گُلبَوری) is a residential area in Afghanistan, located in Jaghatu District of Ghazni Province.

== Demographics ==
Gulbawri is mostly inhabited by ethnic Hazaras.

== See also ==
- List of populated places in Afghanistan
