= Valleys of Afghanistan =

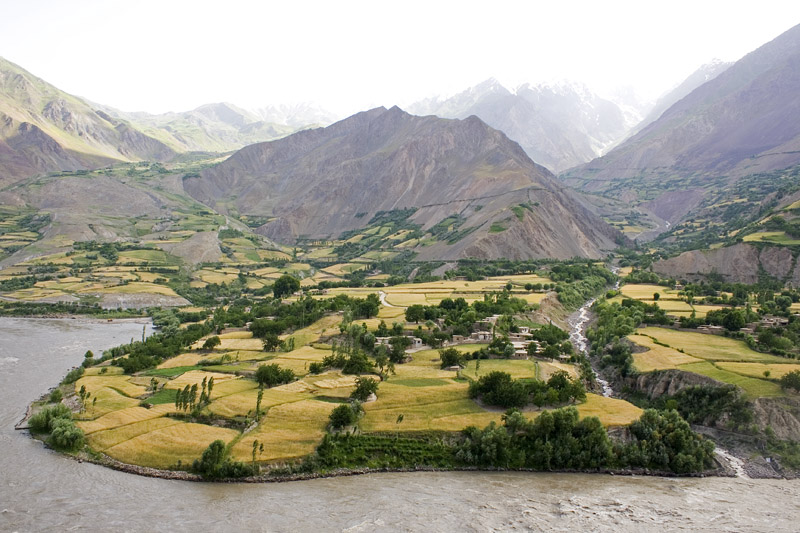
Jamarj-e Bala in Badakhshan Province

Afghanistan, which is about two-thirds mountainous, contains many valleys. The majority of the valleys are located in parts of northeastern, central, southern and southeastern Afghanistan. The southeastern areas are wetter and are covered by forest with trees such as cypress, oak, poplar, pine etc. The valleys are the most populated regions in the country, and much of the agriculture done takes place either in the valleys or on the high plains.

== Wakhan ==
Valleys in the Wakhan include:

- Sheghnan Valley
- Ashava Valley
- Darwaz Valley
- Drayem Valley
- Arsj Valley
- Hnjab Valley
- Farkhar Valley
- Ishkamish District Valley (see Ishkamish District)
- Khost i Fereng Valley
- Samandan Valley
- Andrab Valley
- Khenjan Valley
- Tala wa Barfak Valley (see Tala wa Barfak District)

== Southern Hindu Kush ==
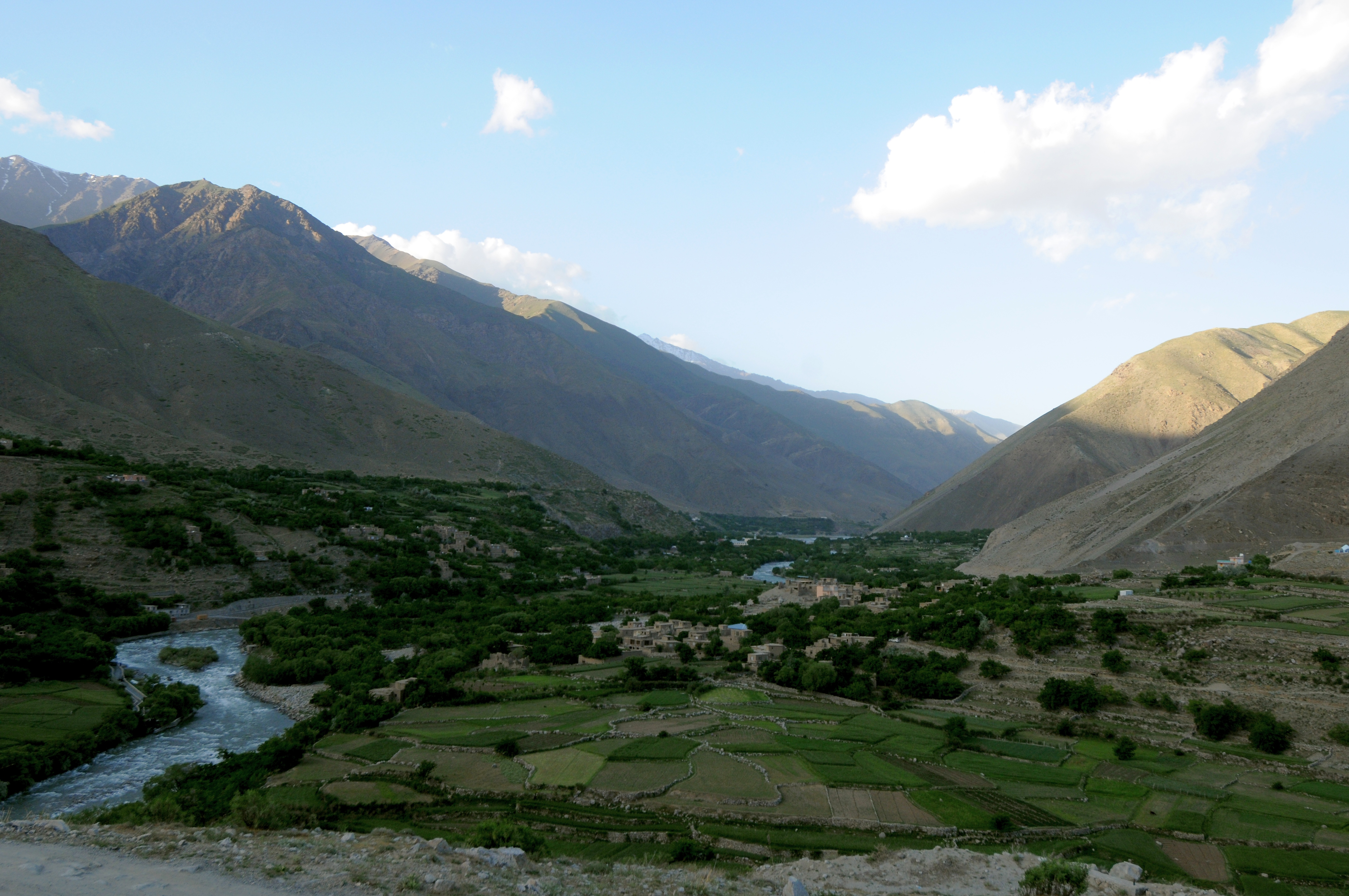
Panjshir Valley

Southern Hindu Kush valleys include (among others):

- Panj Valley Valley
- Korm Valley
- Panjdarh Nijrab Valley
- Bandavol Valley
- Eshpi Valley
- Shishil Valley
- Kepchaq Valley
- Chardeh Valley
- Sayghan Valley
- Kahmard Valley
- Salang Valley
- Darzab Valley
- Panjshir Valley
- Ghorband Valley
- Surobi Valley (see Surobi, Kabul)

== Koh-i-Baba ==
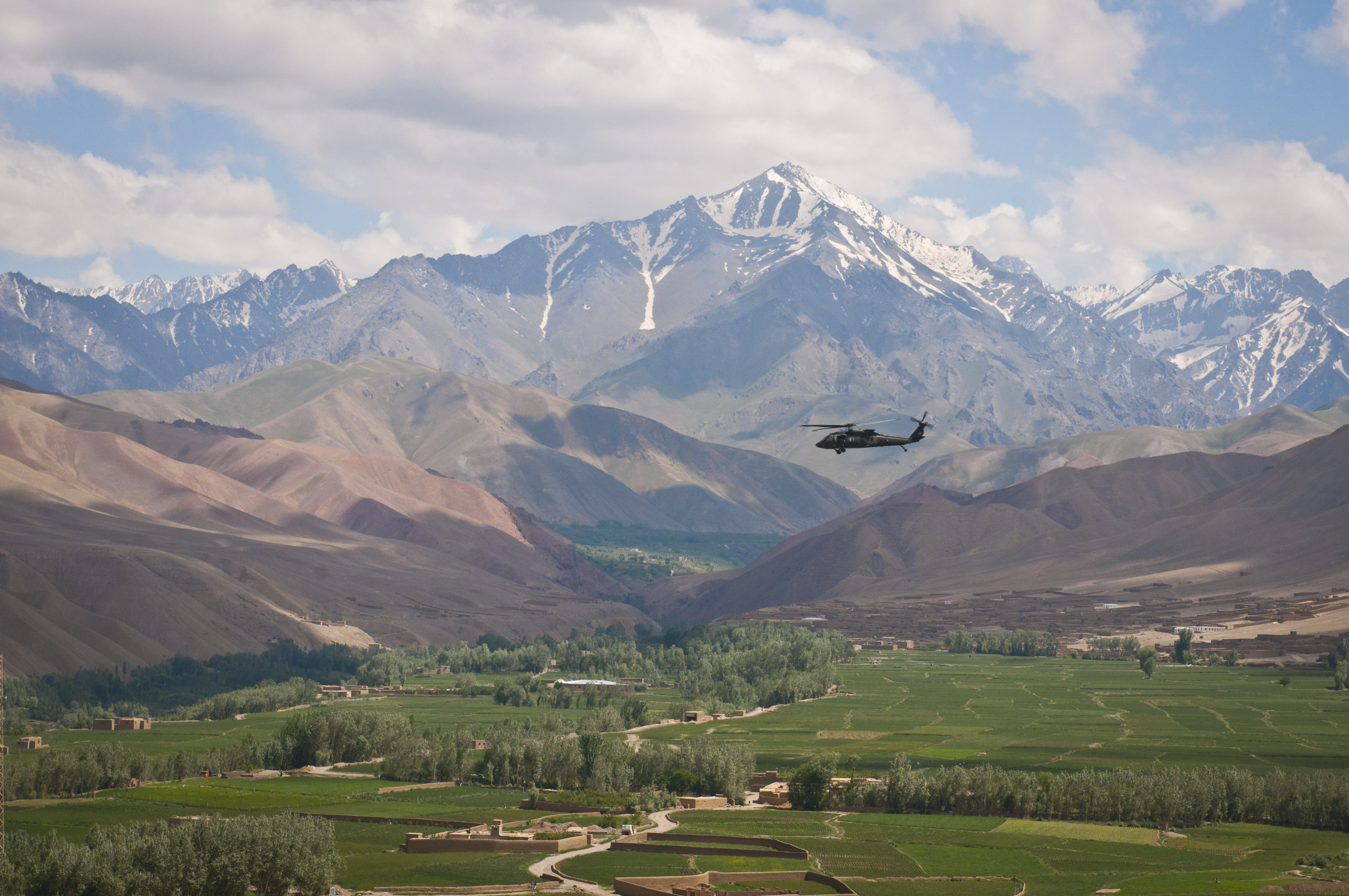
Bamiyan Valley

The Koh-i-Baba mountain range in central Afghanistan includes (among others):

- Foladi Valley
- Bamiyan Valley
- Kakrak Valley
- Turkman Valley

== Safēd Kōh ==
Valleys in Safēd Kōh mountain range include (among others):

- Khyber Pass Valley
- Nazyan District Valley (see Nazyan District)
- Shinwar District Valley (see Shinwar District)
- Achen Valley
- Zarmast Valley
- Jajy Valley
- Khogyani Valley
- Kjah Valley
- Nakrokhil Valley
- Shtowa Valley
- Eshyak Hesarak Valley
- Ghelzai Valley
- Tezhin Valley
- Sarobi Valley
- Musaly Valley
- Sarkhak Valley
- Altimur Valley
- Charkh Kharwar District
- Tangi Valley
- Shnz Valley
- Nawagi Valley
- Gelga Ghazni
- Sholgar Valley
- Abband Valley
- Dalah Valley
- Azkhowah Valley
- Teraa Valley
- Rqiban Valley
- Hassan Khel
- Mchal Ghor
- Shimal Valley
- Nikah Valley
- Berkoti Valley

== Paghman District branch ==
The Paghman District Mountains are a branch of the Hindu Kush mountains, which formed numerous valleys. Valleys here include (among others):

- Parsa Valley
- Behsud Valley
- Nahur Valley
- Malistan Valley
- Ghab Valley
- Daykundi Valley (see Daykundi Province)
- Yakawolang Valley
- Daizangy Valley
- Jaghori Valley
- Ajersitan Valley

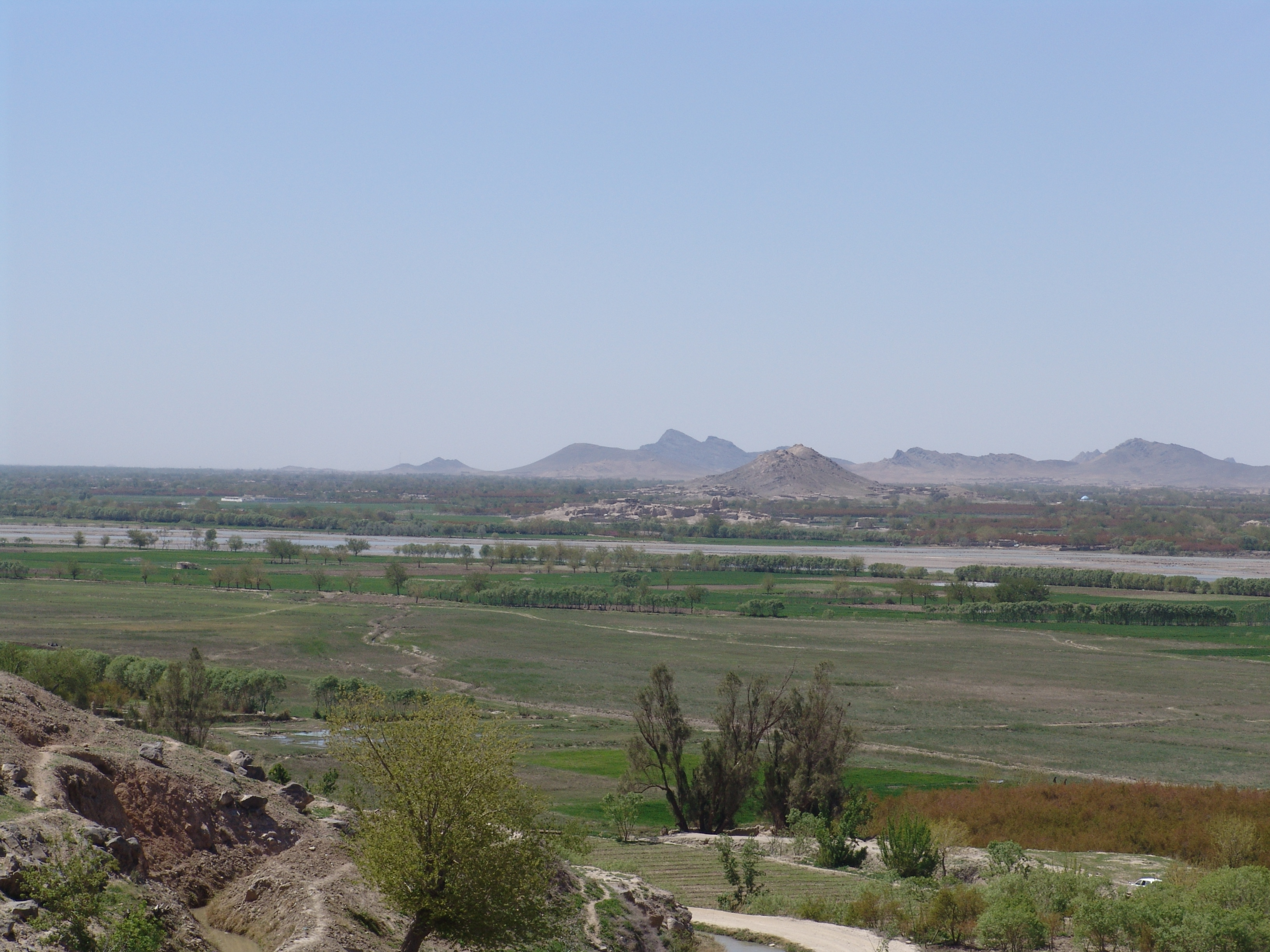
Arghandab Valley in Kandahar Province

There are also many valleys located in the eastern and southern parts of this mountain range, including (among others):

- Shakardara Valley
- Gul Valley
- Estalf Valley
- Gaza Valley
- Paghman Valley (see Paghman District)
- Pshahi Valley
- Jalriz Valley
- Nirkh Valley
- Bec Valley
- Samand Valley
- Dayimurad Valley
- Khowat Valley
- Qyāq Valley
- Gulbawri Valley (see Gulbawri, Ghazni)
- Kakrak Valley
- Torgan Valley
- Shaki Valley
- Zarsang Valley
- Qarabagh Valley (see Qarabagh, Ghazni)
- Zard ålu Tamaki Rasana
- Arghandab Valley
- Gizab Valley (see Gizab, Daykundi)

== Other ==
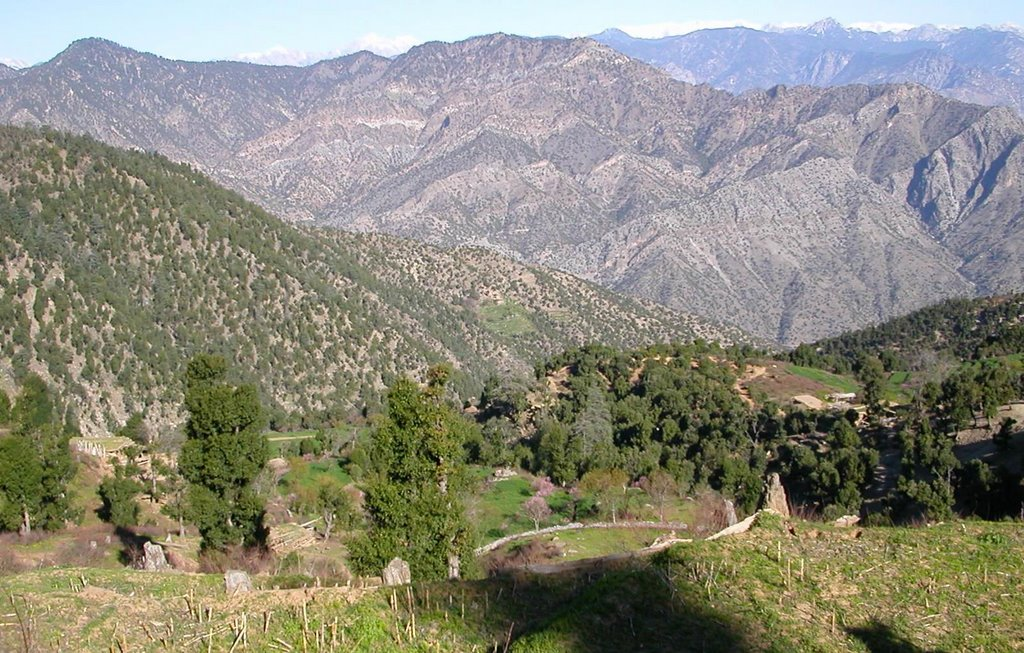
Korengal Valley in Kunar Province

Some other notable valleys include:

- Korengal Valley in Kunar Province
- Dara-I-Pech Valley in Nangarhar Province (see Dara-I-Pech District)
- Deravod Valley and Sangin Valley in Helmand Province
- Darah sof Valley in Samangan Province (see Darah Sof District)
- Kayhan Valley in Baghlan Province
- Charkent Valley in Balkh Province.

== See also ==
- Districts of Afghanistan
- Geography of Afghanistan
