= Reham Khan (memoir) =

Book by Reham Khan

- Author: Reham Khan
- Language: English
- Subject: Memoir
- Publisher: HarperCollins Publishers India; SK Publishers
- Publication date: July 10, 2018 (hardback)
- Publication place: Pakistan
- Pages: 563
- ISBN: 978-9-353-02322-5

Reham Khan is a 2018 memoir written by Reham Khan. She is a former wife of Imran Khan, who later became Prime Minister of Pakistan in 2018. It was published on July 12, 2018 before the 2018 Pakistani general election, leading to claims that its publication was intended to damage Imran Khan's electoral prospects. The book was published by SK Publications in Pakistan and HarperCollins Publishers in India.

== Reception ==
A few days before the book was released, actor Hamza Ali Abbasi claimed that he had read a manuscript and criticized the book for being biased. Reham pointed out the fact that the book had been read illegally and claimed that Abbasi had been threatening her. This was followed by a number of accusations and quarrels between the two on Twitter. Reham Khan faced legal challenges from people whom she made sexual claims about. She was sued by her former first husband Ijaz Rehman, former cricketer Wasim Akram, Zulfi Bukhari and Anila Khawaja. Later, Imran Khan said in an interview that his marriage with Reham was his biggest mistake. Reham denies that there are any cases filed against her by saying that those are just social media threats.

Writing for The National, Sonali Kokra reviewed the book thus: "Tell-alls and memoirs, particularly by ex-spouses, are meant to be read as one side of a story, no matter how juicy the revelations are. Reham’s work is intriguing, but I read it with more than a pinch of salt."
