= Kakrak Valley (Bamyan) =

Kakrak Valley درهٔ ککرک
- Valley
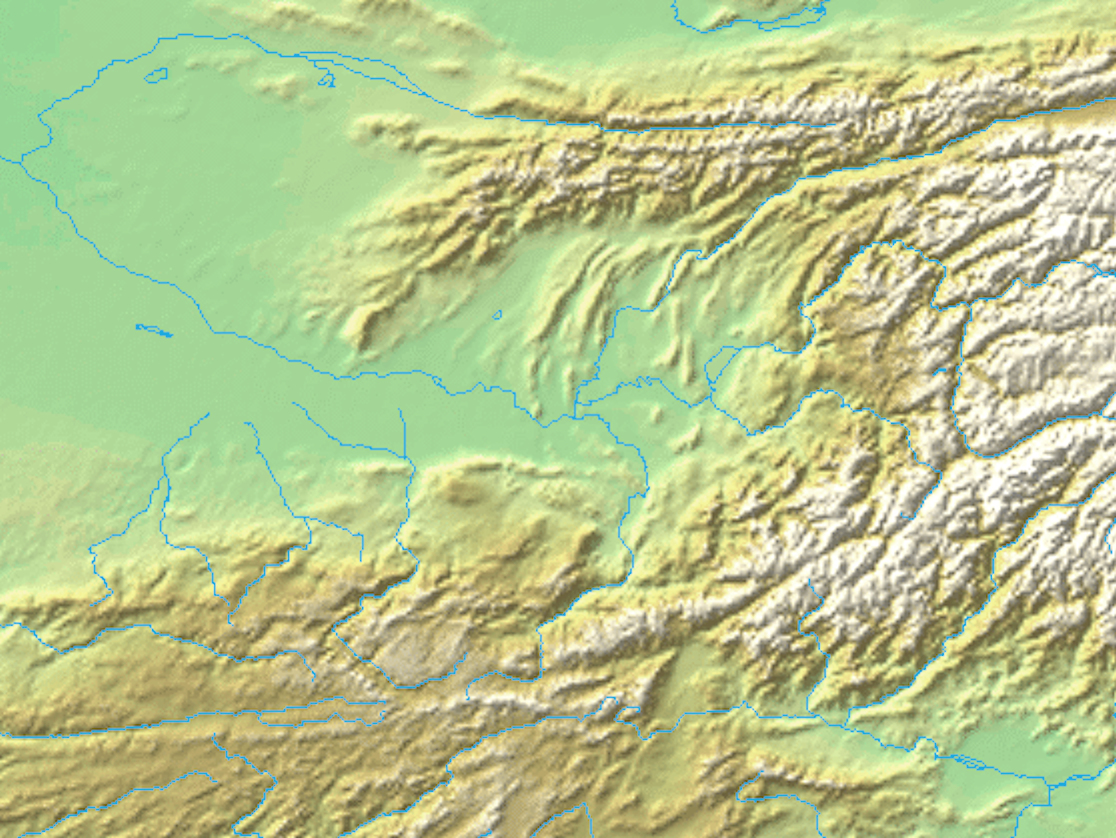
- Location within Afghanistan Location within Bactria Location within West and Central Asia Location within South Asia
- Coordinates: 34.809877°N 67.852553°E
- Country: Afghanistan
- Province: Bamyan Province

Population
  - Ethnicities: Hazara people
- Time zone: + 4.30

Karkak Valley (Dari: درهٔ ککرک) is a valley in central Afghanistan, located in Bamyan province, 120 km west of Kabul province.

The famous Buddhist mural named "The Hunter King" (7-8th centuries CE) shows a typically local royal figure seated on a throne, his bow and arrows on the side. He wears a triple-crescent crown which has been compared to the triple-crescent crowns on the coinage found in northeastern Afghanistan in the area of Zabulistan, such as a coin found in Ghazni. Late 7th to early 8th century CE. Other authors have attributed the triple-crescent crown to Hephthalite influence. The painting may be an allegory of a King abandoning violence, particularly the hunting of animals, and converting to Buddhism.

== Murals from Kakrak ==
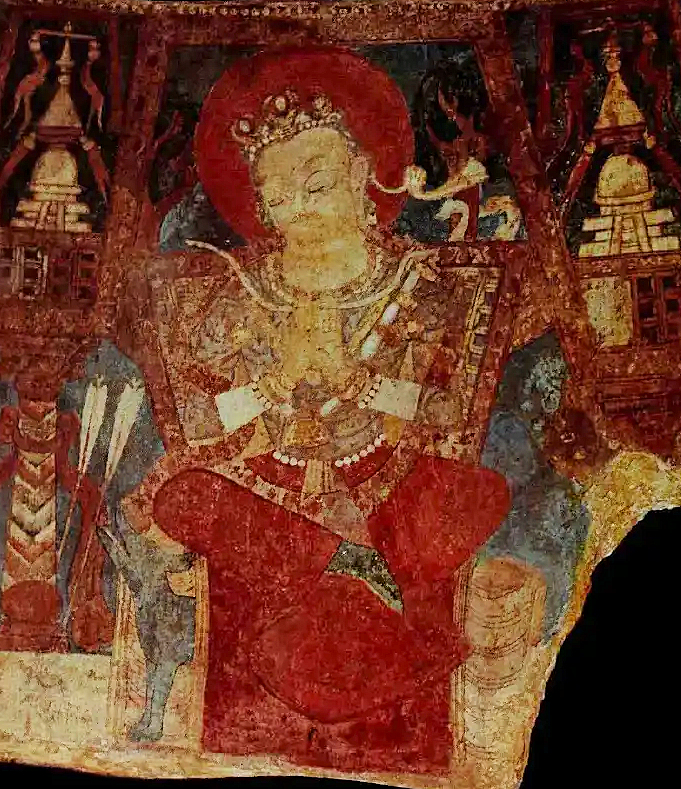
The triple-crescent crown in the "Hunter King" mural from Kakrak (7th-8th century CE) has been compared to the triple-crown in some of the coinage of Afghanistan. Wall paintings from the 7th-8th century, Kabul Museum.

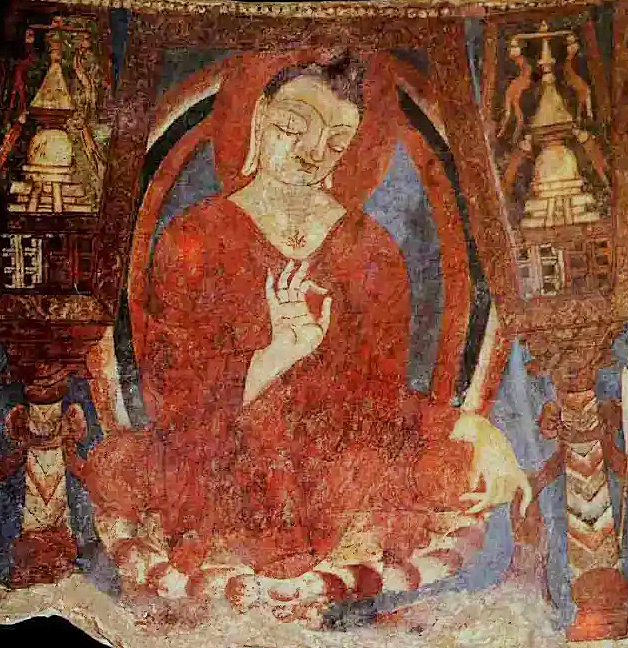
Seated Buddha, Kakrak

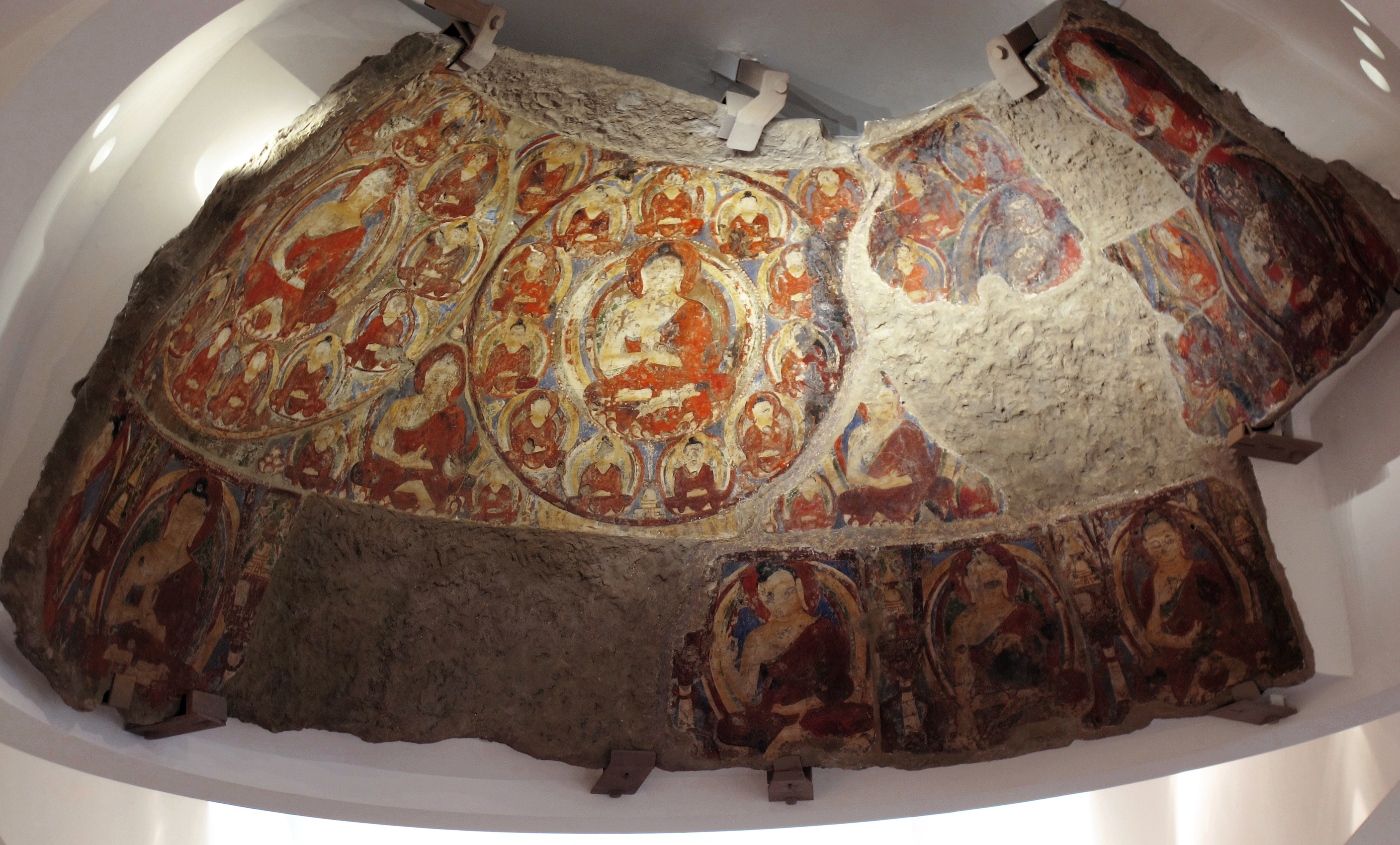
Coupole, Kakrak. Bamiyan. Musée national des arts asiatiques Guimet.

== See also ==
- Bamyan Province
- Valleys of Afghanistan
