= Ashava =

- Village
- Location in Afghanistan
- Coordinates: 35°7′5″N 69°6′28″E
- Country: Afghanistan
- Province: Parwan Province
- District: Ghorband District
- Time zone: UTC+04:30 (AST)

Ashava or Ashawa is a village and valley in Ghorband District, Parwan Province of Afghanistan. It is noted for its cheese, Ashava cheese (Panir-e-Ashawa). A road connects it to Towtamdarreh-ye `Olyā in the east where it joins the A76 highway.

== See also ==
- Parwan Province
