= Khodadad Erfani =

Afghan politician

Afghanistan Parliament

Personal details
- Born: 1953 (age 72–73) Jaghori, Ghazni, Afghanistan
- Occupation: Politician

Khodadad Erfani (Dari: خداداد عرفانی) is an Afghan politician who represented of the Ghazni province in the 16th term of the Afghan Parliament.

== Early life ==
Khodadad Erfani was born in 1953 in Jaghori district of Ghazni province.

== See also ==
- List of Hazara people
