= Jinnah College for Women =

Pakistani women's college

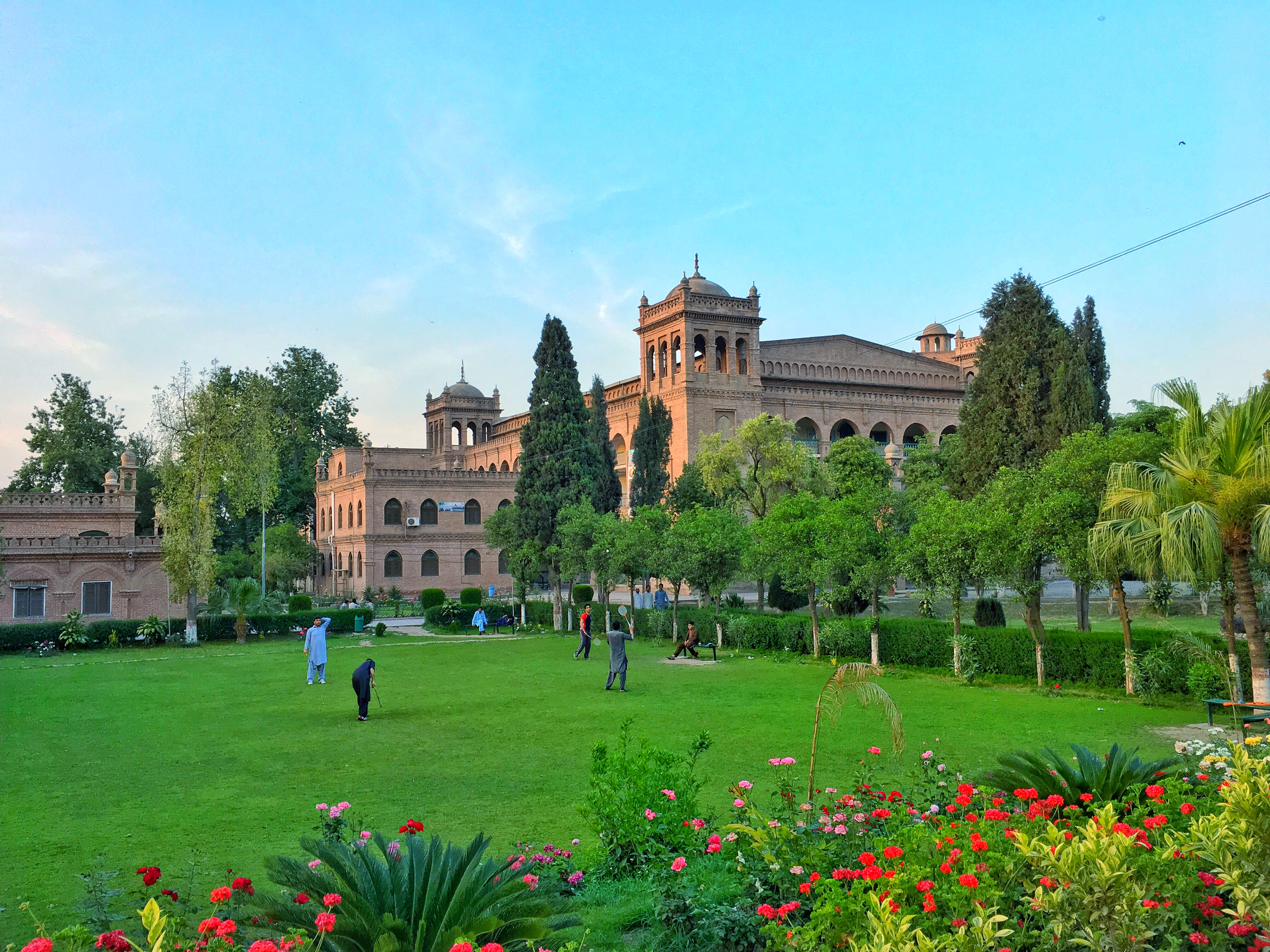
- Motto: رَبِّ زدْنيِ عِلْماً (Arabic)
- Motto in English: Lord, Advance me in Knowledge
- Type: Public
- Established: 1964
- Principal: Prof. Dr. Gulnaz Bano
- Location: Peshawar, Khyber Pakhtunkhwa, Pakistan
- Campus: Urban

Jinnah College for Women, (Urdu: جناح کالج برائے خواتین) formerly the University College for Women, is an institute of education for women located in Peshawar, Khyber-Pakhtunkhwa, Pakistan.

== History ==
The College came into existence as a constituent College of the University of Peshawar on 24 July 1964. It was first called the University Degree College for Women. The founder was Safia Hassan, who was also the first principal. The initial intake was 27 students. By 1980, when Safia Hassan retired, there were 1,700 students. The College aims to support women who would otherwise not be able to afford to attend university.

In 2014, three students of Jinnah College for Women topped the provincial exams.

The College celebrated its Golden jubilee in 2014.

It is now named to commemorate Muhammad Ali Jinnah.

In 2018, 359 students were awarded degrees by the college, though this included students from four college sessions, 2014-2017.

== Edifice ==
The College has a two storey building, erected in a classical form of architecture which consists of classrooms, lecture-theatres, laboratories, a library with two reading rooms, an office and a hall. The college has a lawn, a botanical garden and an attached playground, that serve for inter-class and inter college tournaments and college sports. The library has a collection of reference books, text books and books in specialized fields. The college hall, the Safia Hassan Hall, has a seating capacity of 300 students.
