= Kakrak, Ghazni =

Kakrak Valley درهٔ ککرک
- Valley
- Location within Afghanistan
- Coordinates: 33.46889°N 68.19083°E
- Country: Afghanistan
- Province: Ghazni
- District: Jaghatu

Population
  - Ethnicities: Hazara people
- Time zone: + 4.30

The Kakrak Valley (Dari: درهٔ ککرک) is a residential area in Afghanistan, located in the Jaghatu district of Ghazni province.

== Demographics ==
Kakrak Valley is inhabited by ethnic Hazaras.

== See also ==
- Ghazni Province
