= Yazdan Khan =

British Indian army officer

Jemadar Yazdan Khan یزدان خان
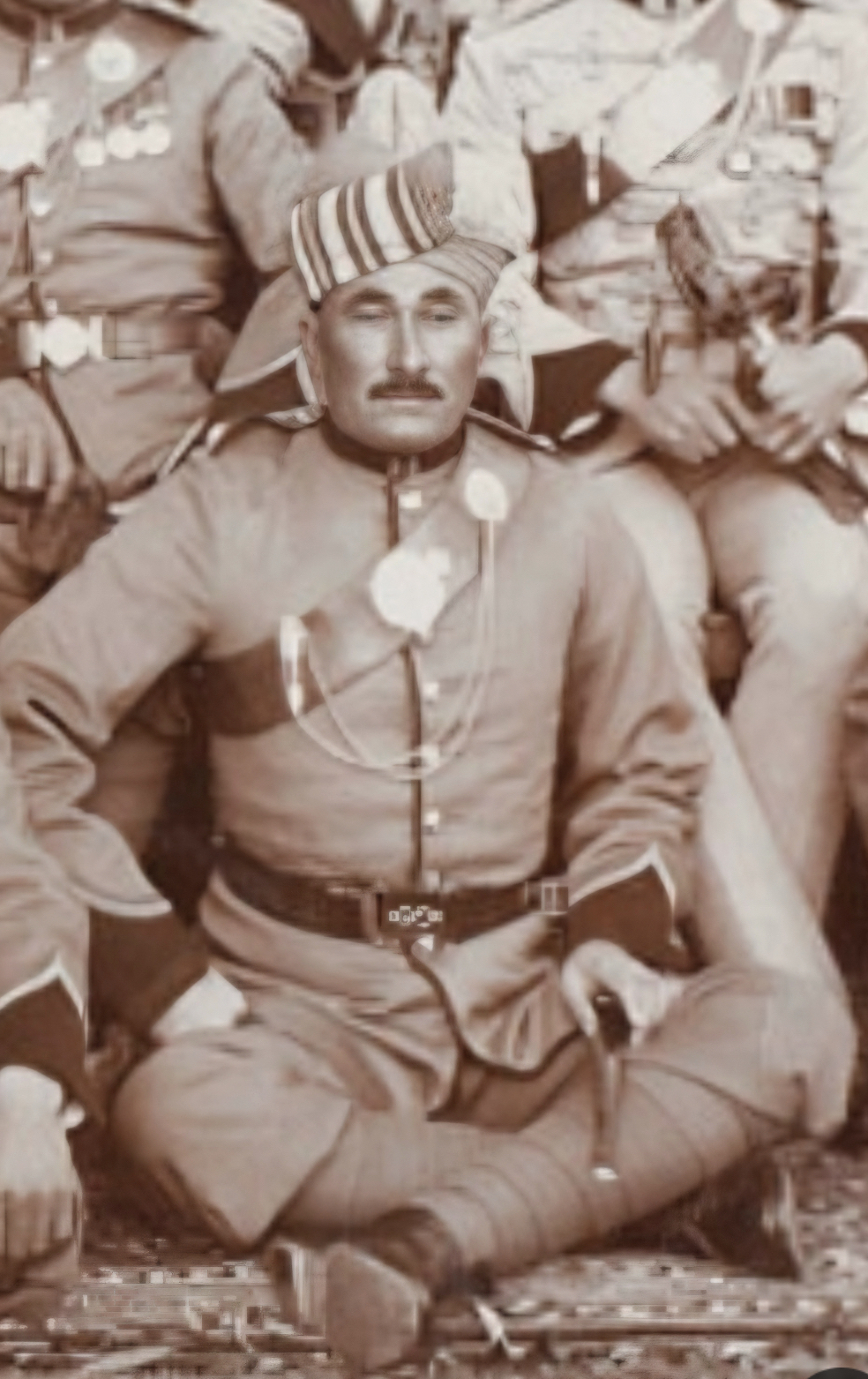
- Born: c. 1880s
- Children: Muhammad Musa
- Military career
- Allegiance: British India
- Branch: (British Raj) British Indian Army
- Service years: 1906-1933
- Rank: Jemadar (Viceroy's Commissioned Officer)
- Unit: 106th Hazara Pioneers
- Conflicts: World War I

Yazdan Khan Hazara (Persian: سردار یزدان خان هزاره) (born c. 1880s) was a Viceroy's Commissioned Officer of the British Indian Army from Baluchistan, British India (later Pakistan) from 1906 until 1926. He was in the 106th Hazara Pioneers during World War I.

He migrated from Sang-e-Masha in Jaghori District, Ghazni Province, Afghanistan to Quetta in 1908 and joined the British army, from which he was discharged in 1926.

== See also ==
- List of Hazara people
