= Sang Masha =

Sang-i-Masha سنگماشه
- District center
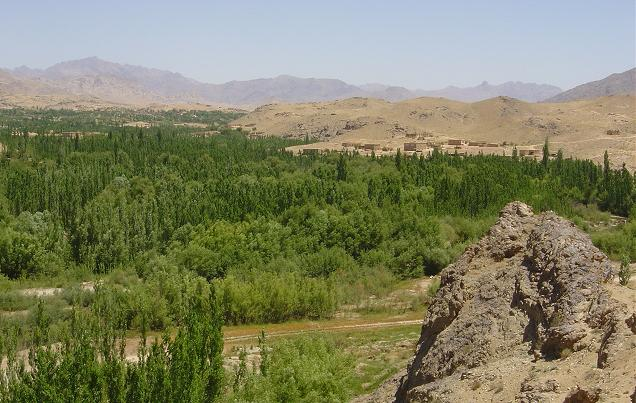

- Location in Afghanistan
- Coordinates: 33°8′38″N 67°26′41″E
- Country: Afghanistan
- Province: Ghazni
- District: Jaghori
- Elevation: 7,982 ft (2,433 m)
- Time zone: UTC+04:30 (Afghanistan Time)

Sang Masha or Sang-i-Masha (Dari: سنگماشه) is a town in Ghazni Province of Afghanistan, serving as the business and administrative center of Jaghori District. Majority of the town's inhabitants are ethnic Hazaras.

== See also ==
- Jaghori District
- Ghazni Province
