= Jaghatu District, Ghazni =

Jaghatu جغتو
- District
- Location within Afghanistan
- Coordinates: 33°34′38″N 68°11′08″E
- Country: Afghanistan
- Province: Ghazni
- Capital: Gulbawri

Population
  - Estimate (2002): 132,265

Jaghatu (Dari: جغتو) is one of the largest and most populated districts of Ghazni province in Afghanistan, west of the city of Ghazni.

== Etymology ==
The name Jaghatu is derived from the Turkic word Jaghatai.

== Demographics ==
The Jaghatu district is mostly populated by the ethnic Hazaras.

== History ==
On 18 May 2020, the Taliban killed two police officers and three civilians on a road in the Qyaq valley of the district and set their bodies on fire.

== Agriculture ==
- The main crops are wheat, potatoes, clovers, and alfalfa.
- Sheep, goats, cows, donkeys, and poultry.

== See also ==
- Districts of Afghanistan
- Hazarajat
