= 2003 Quetta mosque bombing =

Terrorist incident in Quetta, Pakistan

- Map of Quetta
- Location: Quetta, Balochistan, Pakistan
- Date: 4 July 2003 (Pakistan Standard Time)
- Attack type: Suicide bombing, mass shooting, grenade attack
- Weapons: Hand grenades, explosive belt, guns
- Deaths: 53
- Injuries: at least 65
- Perpetrator: Lashkar-e-Jhangvi

On 4 July 2003, 53 Hazara Shias were killed and at least 65 others were injured when a mosque was attacked during the Friday prayer in Quetta, Balochistan, Pakistan. When hundreds of worshipers were offering Friday prayer, three armed men entered the Asna Ashari Hazara Imambargah and started shooting and throwing hand grenades and one suicide bomber blew himself up - which left 53 dead and scores injured. It was the latest of several major sectarian attack targeting the Hazaras in Quetta, coming less than a month after the massacre of Hazara police cadets on June 8, 2003.

== Bombing ==
On 4 July 2003, hundreds of worshippers were offering Friday prayer at the Asna Ashri Hazara Imambargah Kalan mosque when five men armed with automatic weapons entered the mosque and fired on worshippers for ten continuous minutes and tried to throw a grenade, but it exploded in an attacker's hand. Worshippers disarmed one of the attackers and killed a third one. The other two attackers ran away from the roof. This attack left more 65 dead and tens of others injured.

=== Perpetrators ===
Lashkar-e-Jhangvi (LeJ), a banned terrorist group, was responsible for the attack on the mosque. After investigations, intelligence agencies found a video compact disc in which two people are shown who claimed their people attacked the mosque and they were going to meet them in paradise.

== Response ==
- Pervez Musharraf, President of Pakistan at the time, cut short his 18-day trip to America and Europe. He was in a news conference in Paris when he heard the news. On his return to Islamabad, he said:
  Whether they are religious extremists or sectarian extremists they are ignorant and wild.
- In response, police in Quetta arrested around 19 culprits who were found to be involved in the attack.

== See also ==
- Persecution of Hazara people
- Quetta attacks
- 2004 Quetta Ashura massacre
- 2011 Mastung bus shooting
- September 2010 Quetta bombing
- 2011 Hazara Town shooting
- 2019 Ghotki riots
- List of massacres in Pakistan
