= Terrorist incidents in Pakistan in 2011 =

This is a list of terrorist attacks in Pakistan in the calendar year 2011.

== January – March ==
- January 12:- At least 17 people were killed and more than 20 others injured, after a suicide car-bomber rammed his explosive-laden vehicle into a heavily fortified police station in the Bannu district, of north-western Pakistan. It was later confirmed, presumably by eyewitnesses that a Toyota Stout had apparently been used to conduct this suicide attack upon the Merian police station. There were also witness reports who claimed that parts of this police station, as well as a nearby mosque inside the compound were known to have collapsed due to the force of this suicide car bomb explosion. Witnesses reportedly stated that the sheer force of this suicide car-bomb explosion apparently also plunged the local area into darkness, as the blast damaged electricity lines within this area of the district. It was also established that the car bomber had specifically targeted the outer wall of the police station, which was consequently based within a densely populated area of the district. Reports have suggested that more than 50 police officers were inside the police complex at the time of this suicide attack, with local reports suggesting that all those killed were Frontier Corps officials, who act as a federal paramilitary police force within the country. This particular police station that was targeted, is based near the Janikhel tribal area, which is known to act as a buffer zone to the militancy-infested North Waziristan tribal region of north-western Pakistan. This suicide car bombing occurred as U.S. Vice-president, Joe Biden arrived in Islamabad whilst denying that the United States had imposed a war on terror on Pakistan. The Tehrik-i-Taliban Pakistan later claimed responsibility for this suicide car-bomb attack, whilst threatening that such attacks would continue, unless drone attacks were halted against their Al Qaeda and Pakistani Taliban affiliated militant networks and sanctuaries, located most especially within the highly volatile North Waziristan tribal region, which is located on the Afghan-Pakistan border, of north-western Pakistan.
- 25 January At least thirteen people killed while 70 others injured in a suicide bomb explosion in a mourning procession of Imam Hussain near its concluding point at Kerbala Gamay Shah at Bhat Gate in Lahore and few minutes after Lahore blast, a suicide bomber rammed his explosive-laden motorbike into a police van at Malir 15 area of Karachi, killing at least three people while 5 people were injured.
- 1 March At least three people were killed and one was wounded in two bomb blasts in Mohmand tribal region's Saafi tehsil
- 2 March Pakistan minister Shahbaz Bhatti shot dead in Islamabad
- 8 March A car-bomb at a compressed natural gas filling station in Faisalabad killed 20 people and wounded more than 100, Regional Police Officer (RPO) Faisalabad, Aftab Cheema said. The blast set off gas cylinders at the station and the explosion destroyed or severely damaged nearby buildings and numerous vehicles. "An explosive-laden car was parked at the CNG station," police official told reporters. Aftab Cheema said 20 people had been killed and more than 100 wounded.
- 9 March Just a day after the Faisalabad bombing, an explosion occurred at the funeral of the wife of an anti-Taliban militia leader in Peshawar, northwest Pakistan. The bombing left nearly 40 people dead and scores injured. The Taliban claimed responsibility for the attack.
- 31 March An unsuccessful suicide bombing assassination attempt on Fazlur Rehman, the chief of Pakistan's Jamiat-e-Ulema-Islam political party, in Swabi killed 10 people and left another 20 injured.

== April – June ==
- April 1 A second assassination attempt on Fazlur Rehman occurred, this time in the city of Charsadda. At least 13 people were killed and more than 31 injured as a suicide bomber blew himself up next to the leader's convoy vehicle.
- April 3 Over 50 people were killed and 120 wounded when two suicide bombers detonated explosives at a Sufi shrine in Dera Ghazi Khan, Punjab.
- April 5 - A suicide attack at a market in Lower Dir, Khyber Pakhtunkhwa killed seven people including a local anti-Taliban leader and his son.
- April 22 - Militants detonate a bomb near a gambling casino in Karachi, killing 19 people.
- April 26 - Four men on motorcycles opened fire on a bus full of passengers, then sprinkled petrol on it and set it on fire, killing everyone inside in Quetta, Balochistan.
- May 2 US Special forces kill Osama bin Laden at a local compound in Abbottabad, Pakistan.
- May 6 - 2011 Hazara Town shooting
- May 13 - Two suicide bombers attacked a paramilitary academy training young cadets in Charsadda, more than 80 people were killed and at least 15 injured, the attack was called by the Taliban as revenge for the killing of Osama bin Laden.
- May 18 Terrorists of a banned outfit attacked a pick-up bringing members of the Hazara community to Quetta with automatic weapons on Wednesday, killing seven of them.
- May 22 Militants attack Mehran Naval Station, killing at least 9 people and destroying 2 Pakistani P-3C Orion maritime surveillance aircraft.
- June 12 Three sets of bombings in the Khyber Market area of Peshawar left 34 civilians dead and over 100 injured. The attack was blamed on the Taliban, although a spokesman for the Tehreek-i-Taliban Pakistan denied responsibility and instead blamed the attack on "foreign agents."
- June 13 A suicide bomber detonated himself outside a bank in the I-8 Markaz sector of Islamabad after a security guard tried to stop him. The suicide bomber and the guard both died on the spot while a few people were left injured.
- June 25 Five militants attacked a police station in Kulachi tehseel of Dera Ismail Khan, a district which borders South Waziristan in northwest Pakistan. The militants were disguised in the burqa dress; two of the terrorists also wore suicide bombing vests. They used grenades and gunfire to launch the attack, killing at least ten police personnel. By the end of the operation, all of the attackers were reported as having been killed. A few dozen police officers were left trapped in the building as a result of the incident.
- June 26 A small blast occurred in Multan in the premises of a police station, injuring ten people, four of which were police officers. About 10 kg of explosives were used to cause the explosion. The police arrested a suspect immediately following the incident.

== July – September ==
- Multiple target killings in Karachi throughout the months of July and August left hundreds of people dead. The month has been recorded as the deadliest and most violent in the history of Karachi since the last two decades – in fighting related to religious and ethnic tensions. This was followed by 44 more fatalities in the following month of August, amidst ongoing violence.
- August 11 A female suicide bomber detonated herself and killed five policemen in Peshawar. Two other separate incidents also took place in the city, killing two more people. 42 others were injured.
- August 19 A blast in a mosque in the town of Jamrud in Khyber Agency left over 50 people dead.
- August 25 A blast outside a hotel in Risalpur Tehsil, Nowshera in Khyber Pakhtunkhwa kills 11 and injures 15 people.
- August 27 2011 Chitral cross-border attacks
- August 29 At least three people were killed and 19 others injured when a group of armed men opened fire and lobbed rockets on a passenger train near Mach Town, which is 60 kilometers southeast of Quetta in Balochistan.
- August 31 Eleven people were killed in Quetta following a bombing outside a mosque on the day of Eid ul-Fitr, when Shi'a Muslim worshippers belonging to the Hazara community were conducting Eid prayers.
- September 1 Twelve people were killed in Lakki Marwat following a suicide car bombing near a police checkpost.
- September 7 Twin explosions in the city of Quetta left at least 26 people dead.
- September 13 Four school children along with a bus driver were killed in Peshawar during an attack on their school bus by unidentified gunmen. Seventeen others also sustained injuries.
- September 13 A makeshift bomb exploded near the vehicle of Sher Khan, head of the Awami National Party in the Lower Dir area, killing the leader.
- September 15 A Taliban suicide bomber struck the funeral ceremony of a tribal elder who belonged to an anti-Taliban militia in Peshawar, killing at least 25 people on the funeral.
- September 19 Eight people died and several others were injured when a suicide bomber belonging to the Tehrik-i-Taliban Pakistan rammed an explosives-laden car outside the house of SSP Chaudhry Aslam Khan, a senior police officer living in the posh Defence Housing Authority area of Karachi, Sindh. Khan and his family managed to escape the attack although his house was destroyed by the blast and a few other civilians near the blast site were killed when the incident occurred. Khan works at the Crime Investigation Department (CID) and is infamous for having led tough measures and police operations against notorious criminal elements and members of underworld groups in Karachi (including the likes of Rehman Dakait); a column published in The Express Tribune dubbed Chaudhry Aslam Khan as the "Sultan Rahi" of Sindh Police. He is a recipient of the Pakistan Police Medal, Qauid-e-Azam Police Medal and the Tamgha-i-Imtiaz, which was awarded to him by the President in early 2011. This was the second attempt on his life, with police officials confirming that Khan had apparently been on the hit list of militant groups for quite a long time. Neighboring houses were also severely damaged as a result of the attack while other houses located not far from the vicinity of the blast site had their windows shattered. There were also schools located near the house which had their buildings and infrastructure damaged, such as the Haque Academy, Beaconhouse and the Washington International School; the schools were temporarily closed for repair. Among the victims of the blast included a female schoolteacher from the Washington International School and her son, Khan's police guards and cook, and the son and driver of a neighbour. When responding to the attack on his house, Khan remarked that he will not step back or be cowed and would carry on his "jihad against the terrorists." He also added: "Why don’t they come attack me in the open? I didn’t know these terrorists are such cowards that they will attack sleeping children" and threatened that he would teach the terrorists who attacked his house a lesson that "even their next generations would remember."
- September 19 Five people were killed and over two dozen injured after a remote-controlled bomb ripped through a market selling CDs in Peshawar.
- September 20 At least 26 people were killed when armed militants affiliated with the Lashkar-e-Jhangvi attacked a bus travelling in Mastung near the city of Quetta in Balochistan. The victims were pilgrims who were travelling towards Taftan and belonged to the Shi'a Muslim Hazara community, suggesting the attack to have been a targeted killing of sectarian nature.
- September 23 Three people were killed and two injured when unidentified gunmen opened fire on a van carrying passengers who belonged to the Hazara Shi'a community. The attack came just three days after the Mastung bus incident, in which members of the Hazara community were also targeted.
- September 23 Four people, including two women, were killed and six others injured when two roadside bombs targeted a passenger vehicle in Bajaur.
- September 28 Three people were killed and four injured when militants affiliated with the Balochistan Liberation Army opened fire on men who were conducting oil and gas exploration in Balochistan's Harnai District.

== October – December ==
- October 2 A police van carrying 32 recruits which was heading towards a training facility in Abbottabad was attacked by a remote-controlled bomb near Mansehra. The bomb killed four recruits and injured fifteen others. The dead and injured were shifted to the Ayub Medical Complex immediately.
- October 4 Unknown gunmen riding a motorbike opened fire on a schoolteacher in Khuzdar, Balochistan, killing him on the spot. A woman was also reported injured.
- October 9 Four people were killed and six others injured in various separate incidents in Quetta, Balochistan.
- October 25 A Frontier Corps (FC) officer was killed after a landmine exploded near the Sorange coal mines in Quetta. In a separate incident also in Quetta, a doctor was shot and injured by unknown assailants in the Satellite Town suburb.
- October 26 Twelve people, including a woman and two children, were injured in a low-intensity bomb blast in a Peshawar market.
- October 27 Two kilogram explosives packed in a ghee container exploded in a market in Peshawar, injuring fourteen people.
- October 29 A seventeen-year-old suicide bomber detonated his explosives near a police car in Nowshera, killing two policemen. The dead policemen included Ajmeer Shah, a regional police inspector in Risalpur, and one of his gunmen. According to an official, Shah was the main target of the attack because he had played an important role in the killing a senior Tehreek-e-Taliban leader in the area a few months back. Shah was awarded with various distinctions, including a Pride of Performance award for his crackdowns on criminals and anti-militant activities. His body was laid to rest a day later, in a funeral attended by 300 people.
- November 2 An explosion took place in Peshawar's Karkhano Market, injuring eleven people. The bomb was planted inside a car.
- November 3 Two members of the Frontier Corps were killed after their vehicle was hit by a remote controlled bomb in Turbat, Balochistan.
- November 5 A man who was planting explosives in the Hazara Town suburb of Quetta fell victim to his own plot when his explosives blew up prematurely. The man died on the spot. According to a police official, the explosives were meant to target members of the Shi'a Hazara community, who are the residents of Hazara Town.
- November 5 Two security personnel were killed and three injured when a security force convoy came under ambush in the Razmak region of North Waziristan in FATA.
- November 7 Three people including a former Awami National Party tehsil nazim Hanif Gul Jadoon, were killed and another nine injured during a suicide attack in Swabi. Jadoon was reportedly on his way back after attending Eid prayers on the day when his vehicle was targeted. One of Jadoon's two sons who were accompanying him, fourteen-year-old Ahmed Jadoon, also succumbed to injuries a day later at the Lady Reading Hospital in Peshawar.
- November 16 Suicide bombers inside a vehicle were pursued by police in Karachi's beachfront area of Seaview, leading to a shoot-out incident. During the melee, one of the militants detonated his suicide explosives, causing the car which the militants were travelling in, to blow up. The casualties in the incident included four militants as well as two policemen. One of the officers, Maula Bukhsh died on the spot, while the second officer, Mumraiz Iqbal, succumbed to his injuries at the Jinnah Post Graduate Medical Centre.
- November 17 Eight people, including five of them of the same family, were killed by a roadside bomb in Khyber Agency.
- November 19 Two Frontier Corps personnel died and another three were injured when a landmine blast occurred near the Sui area of Balochistan province. Members of the Balochistan Liberation Army claimed responsibility for the incident.
- November 21 Fourteen soldiers of the Frontier Corps, including a Major, were killed when Balochistan Liberation Army militants attacked their convoy with sophisticated weapons near Musa Khel in Balochistan.
- December 6 A loud blast attributed to an exploding gas cylinder occurred in Karachi, during the Muslim observance day of Muharram. No casualties or injuries were reported. Hours later, another explosion occurred on Karachi's Kala Pul bridge. One man was injured in the explosion. Both blasts may have possibly been targeting nearby Shi'a Muslim processions.
- December 9 A landmine blast occurred in Kurram Agency in FATA when a contingent of security forces stepped on it. One soldier sustained injuries.
- December 9 A remote-controlled roadside bomb exploded in the Gulistan-e-Jauhar area of Karachi. Three paramilitary troops from Pakistan Rangers were killed and another four injured.
- December 10 At least seven people were injured and one motorcyclist, identified as Abdul Manaf, was killed after a bomb which had been planted outside the main gate of the University of Karachi exploded. According to police estimates, explosives weighing between five and eight kilograms were used in the blast. The bomb left a two-feet crater in the site. The injured were shifted to hospital. Members of the bomb disposal squad arrived to carry out investigations, while police cordoned off the site.
- December 10 Tehreek-i-Taliban militants blew up two shrines in Khyber Agency. A caretaker of one of the shrines was killed by unknown gunmen.
- December 14 Two FC personnel were killed in Balochistan due to a landmine explosion.
- December 24 A suicide bomber killed five paramilitary troops in Bannu.
- December 29 Two assailants on a motorbike opened fire on the vehicle of a police surgeon, Dr Syed Baqir Shah in Quetta, Balochistan. Shah was a key witness in the controversial Kharotabad incident. He carried out autopsies of five foreigners, including two women, who were shot dead by security personnel in Quetta's suburb of Kharotabad in May on the pretext of being suspected "terrorists". Shah disputed the account of law enforcement agencies, claiming that the victims were civilians who had died of gunshot wounds instead of their own hand grenades, which police officials alleged them of carrying.
- December 30 A remote controlled bomb in Bajaur agency killed two children.
- December 30 A suicide bomber affiliated with the Balochistan Liberation Army killed 13 people in Quetta.
- December 31 Two schoolchildren were killed and seven others injured after a bomb went off during a jirga being held in Landi Kotal, Khyber Agency.
