= Mundarakht massacre =

Orchestrated mass killing by Taliban

- Part of War in Afghanistan, Persecution of Hazaras, Anti-Shi'ism
- Location: Mundarakht, Malistan district, Ghazni province, Afghanistan
- Target: Hazaras
- Attack type: Shooting, Torture, Mutilation, Strangulation
- Deaths: 9
- Victims: Wahed Qaraman, 45; Jaffar Rahimi, 63; Sayed Abdul Hakim, 40; Ali Jan Tata, 65; Zia Faqeer Shah, 23; Ghulam Rasool Reza, 53; Sayeed Ahmad, 75; Zia Marefat, 28; Karim Baksh Karimi, 45
- Perpetrator: Taliban
- Motive: Persecution of Hazaras

From July 4 to July 6, 2021, the Taliban carried out a series of killings in the village of Mundarakht, situated in the Ghazni Province of Afghanistan, targeting Hazara men. The killings were condemned and shock was expressed at the savagery of killings, especially when it was revealed that the Taliban used torture in order to kill the men.

== Background ==
Hazaras have been a persecuted minority in Afghanistan since the 1800s from the reign of Abdur Rahman Khan and the 1888–1893 Hazara uprisings. Since then, the Hazara community has faced constant persecution since then, including the 21st century.

Despite improvement of conditions after the topple of the Taliban regime in 2001, conditions worsened after the Taliban victory, with the Taliban continuing their persecution of the Hazara minority.

Prior to the killings, the families of Mundarakht were forced to flee to the mountains, when they returned, they came to see their houses looted and the aftermath of a massacre.

== Killings ==
Wahed Qaraman, 45, was taken out of house by Taliban fighters, who then proceeded to break his limbs, shoot him in the leg, pull his hair out and beat his face with a blunt object.

Jaffar Rahimi, 63, was accused by Taliban fighters of working for the Afghan government when money was found in his pocket, Taliban fighters then strangled him with his own scarf and carved off his arm muscles before he finally died.

Sayed Abdul Hakim, 40, was taken from his house by Taliban fighters who then beat him with sticks and rifle butts with his arms bound and was shot twice in the leg and twice in the chest before the Taliban fighters dumped his body next to a nearby creek.

AlI Jan Tata, Zia Faqeer Shah, Ghulam Rasool Reza, 65, 23, 53 respectively - shot as they attempted to reach their homes in the nearby hamlet of Wuli.

Sayeed Ahmad, 75, was assured by Taliban fighters that they would not harm him as he was elderly and were permitted to feed his cattle, but Taliban fighters proceeded to shoot him in his chest and side.

Zia Marefat, 28, suffered from depression and did not leave his house to go to safety, was then eventually convinced by his mother to flee, but when he tried, he was captured by the Taliban and shot in the temple, killing him.

Karim Baksh Karimi, 45, had an undiagnosed mental health condition which lead to him acting erratically. The Taliban fighters then executed him by shooting him in the head.

== Reactions ==
The Taliban defended their actions, stating "When it is the time of conflict, everyone dies, it doesn't matter if you have guns or not. It is the time of war.:

Amnesty International's Secretary-General Agnès Callamard said: "The cold-blooded brutality of these killings is a reminder of the Taliban's past record, and a horrifying indicator of what Taliban rule may bring."

== See also ==
- List of massacres against Hazaras
