= 2011 Mastung bus shooting =

21st-century mass murder in Pakistan

- Location: Mastung near Quetta, Pakistan
- Date: 20 September 2011
- Target: Hazara Shia minority
- Attack type: Shooting
- Deaths: 26
- Injuries: 6
- Perpetrator: Lashkar e Jhangvi

The 2011 Mastung bus shooting was an armed attack on 20 September 2011 on a bus traveling in Mastung District near the city of Quetta in the Pakistani province of Balochistan. The attack left at least 26 people dead. The victims were Shi'a Muslim pilgrims of the Hazara community, suggesting the attack to be a sectarian targeted killing. The attack occurred in Luck Pass area near Mastung. The bus was leaving Quetta for Taftan, Balochistan. In addition, two other peoplw others were killed in a follow-up attack on a car on its way to rescue the survivors of the bus attack, which raised the death toll to 28 on that day.

Lashkar-e-Jhangvi, a Sunni extremist Pakistani militant group designated as a terrorist organization by Pakistan and the United States claimed responsibility for the attack.

== Background ==
Many Hazaras, due to economic problems, travel to far and remote areas in search of employment. One of the locations is Taftan, a border town with Iran, which provides many income opportunities for thousands of people daily. Some Hazaras even move to Mashhad and Tehran to earn a living. As majority of Hazara people are from the Shia sect of Islam, likewise thousands of other people from around the world, go to Iran for the pilgrimage of shrine of Imam Reza.

Mastung is a town located in the north-west of Balochistan. The majority of the population is Sunni Baloch.

== Massacre ==
A group of around 10 men on two vehicles, armed with rocket launchers and Kalashnikovs assault rifles, stopped a passenger bus carrying pilgrims in the Ganjidori area of Mastung. The bus was travelling from Quetta to Taftan, a Pakistani town on the border with Iran. 45 passengers were on board, but only the Hazaras were identified and asked to step out. They were lined up and the assailants started shooting non-stop for ten minutes, which left 26 dead at the end of the day.

=== Perpetrators ===
The banned Pakistani Sunni extremist militant group, Lashkar-e-Jhangvi (LeJ) claimed the responsibility for the massacre. The same terrorist group has also been involved in Hazara Town massacre, Ashura massacre, Mosque massacre, and Quds Day bombing.

== Funeral ==
The burial ceremony was conducted the next day, in Hazara Town cemetery. The bodies were taken to 26 Imabargahs within Hazara Town.

== Protest and reactions ==
Protesters held a peaceful protest against the attack on Hazara pilgrims. The protesters demanded the resignation of Balochistan Chief Minister, Aslam Raisani. Thousands of women and children took part in the protest and demanded the United Nations take notice of what had been happening to the Hazara people. Protests, rallies and demonstrations were held in the wake of the terrorist attack in different parts of the country, including Karachi, Skardu, Muzaffarabad, Nawabshah, Sukkur, Ghotki and Multan.

The President of Pakistan, Asif Ali Zardari, Balochistan Governor Zulfiqar Magsi, Chief Minister Aslam Raisani, the Universal Muslim Association of America (UMAA) and others strongly condemned the barbaric attack on the Hazara Shia minority in Quetta.

The Chief Justice of the Balochistan High Court took suo moto notice of the killings and issued notices to the federal and provincial Government of Balochistan in the wake of the attack.

A committee was formed by Balochistan Chief Minister, to probe the incident and report within 15 days. The committee comprised Interior Secretary Major (R) Chaudhry Qamar Zaman, Inspector General Balochistan Police Rao Mohammad Amin Hashim, Commissioner of Quetta and Khuzdar Division Naseem Lehri, Capital City Police Officer Quetta Ehsan Mahboob, Deputy Commissioner of Quetta Shaukat Ali Maraghzani and Mastung Deputy Commissioner Noorul Haq Baloch.

The license of the company which was carrying the pilgrims was canceled by Home Minister Mir Zafarullah Zehri. Iranian Government closed the Taftan border with Iran after the incident.

== See also ==
- Persecution of Hazara people in Quetta
