= Hazara Restaurant =

- Interactive map of Hazara Restaurant

Restaurant information
- Established: 2017
- Closed: 2018
- Previous owner: Hamida Ali Hazara
- Manager: Hamida Ali Hazara
- Food type: Hazara, Pakistani
- Location: Hazara Town, Quetta, Balochistan, 87330, Pakistan
- Coordinates: 30.1742°N 66.9608°E

Hazara Restaurant was a restaurant in Hazara Town situated in the outskirts of Quetta, in Balochistan, Pakistan. It was founded in 2017 by Hamida Ali Hazara, who is also the founder of Hurmatty Niswa Foundation, a non-profit organization geared towards helping Hazara women.

The restaurant was closed in 2018.

== Background ==
Hazara opened her restaurant in order to provide local women with a meeting place, and to offer employment to women from the Hazara minority group, which has faced widespread persecution. Although the focus was on offering a space for women, men were allowed to dine there in the evenings.
