= Jalila Haider =

Pakistani human rights lawyer

- جلیله حیدر
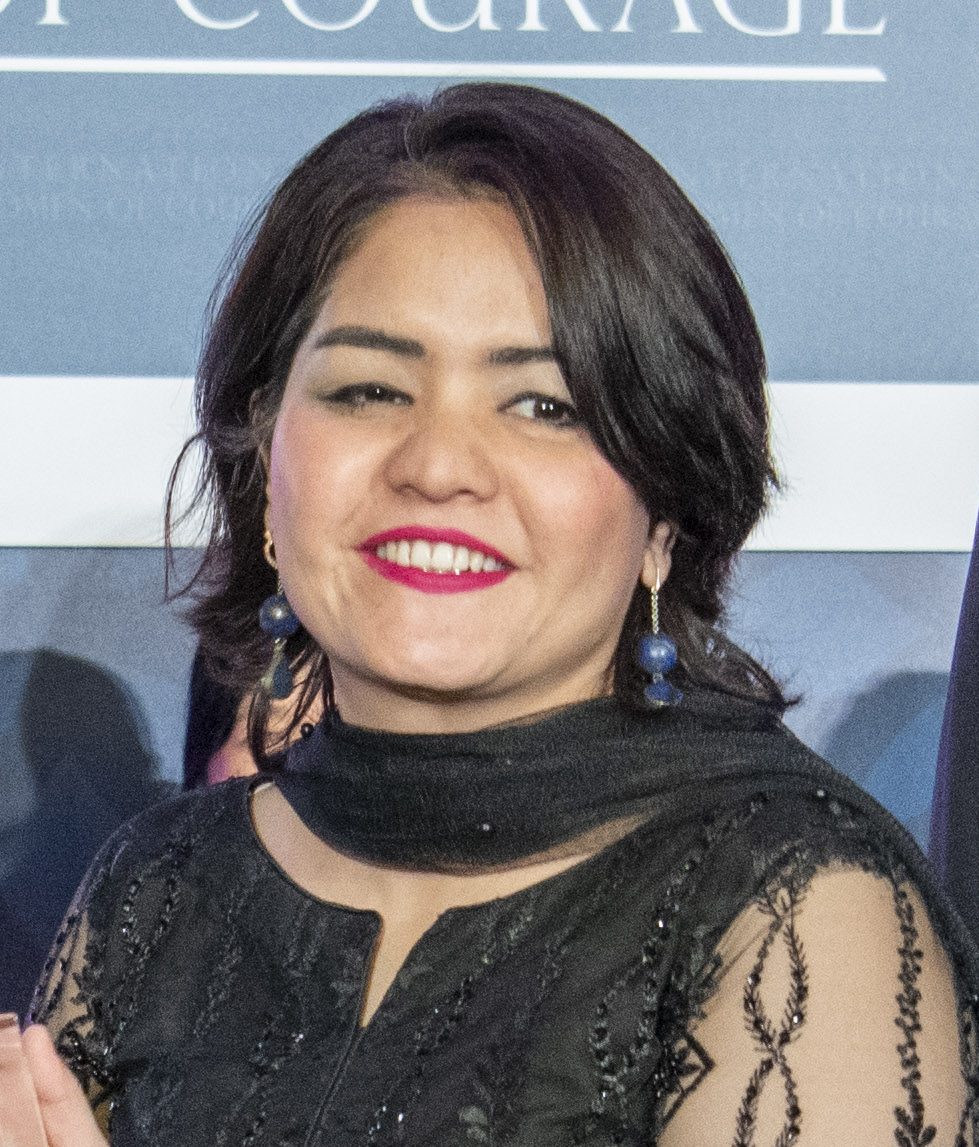
- Haider in 2020
- Born: Jalila Haider; 10 December 1988 (age 37); Quetta, Balochistan, Pakistan
- Education: University of Balochistan; University of Sussex
- Occupations: Lawyer, Feminist, Human rights activist
- Known for: First female lawyer from the persecuted Hazara community of Quetta, Provincial President Women Democratic Front, Political worker Awami Workers Party
- Notable work: Founder of 'We the Humans – Pakistan'; Being listed in 100 Women (BBC) in 2019

Jalila Haider (Urdu/Hazaragi: جلیله حیدر; born 10 December 1988) is a Pakistani human rights attorney and political activist from Quetta in Balochistan, Pakistan. She is known to be the first woman lawyer from Quetta's Hazara minority, and an advocate for the rights of her persecuted community. She is a member of the Awami Workers Party (AWP), leader of the Balochistan chapter of Women Democratic Front (WDF), and an activist in the Pashtun Tahafuz Movement (PTM). She founded a non-profit organisation, "We the Humans – Pakistan," which aims to empower local communities in Balochistan by strengthening opportunities for vulnerable women and children.

She was named in BBC's 100 Women of 2019, and was chosen as an International Woman of Courage by the United States Department of State in March 2020. In 2022, she won the first-ever ‘Pakistan Peace Award’ for her work and contribution to bring tolerance and sustainable peace in the country.

== Early life and education ==
Jalila Haider was born on 10 December 1988, in Quetta, Balochistan, Pakistan. She holds a master's degree in International Relations from the University of Balochistan.

In 2020, Haider received a scholarship in the University of Sussex, a public research university located in Falmer, Sussex, England.

== Career ==
Haider has been a supporter of the rights of vulnerable communities and has spoken out against human rights violations and abuses faced by them. She has campaigned against the enforced disappearances and killings of Baloch political workers and has led protests and sit-ins against the ethnic cleansing of the Hazaras. She participates and speaks against the atrocities faced by the Pashtuns and believes that their pain is similar as they are all demanding for their right to life guaranteed in the Constitution of Pakistan. Haider also addressed a meeting of the Pashtun Tahaffuz Movement in Quetta in March 2018, for which she received criticism and harassment.

After four separate attacks targeting the Hazara community in April 2018, Haider led a peaceful hunger strike camp outside Quetta press club, which lasted for around five days. Haider and other leaders demanded that Pakistan's Chief of Army Staff, Qamar Javed Bajwa must visit the community and take concrete steps to bring the perpetrators to justice and ensure their security. Haider and community elders had inconclusive talks with Balochistan Chief Minister Mir Abdul Quddus Bizenjo, Federal Interior Minister Ahsan Iqbal, Provincial Home Minister Mir Sarfraz Bugti. The strike ended after Qamar Javed Bajwa held meetings with the tribal elders and representatives of the community, including Hazara women, in which he ensured security and protection of the community's right to life. Following the hunger strike, on 2 May 2018, the Chief Justice of Pakistan, Mian Saqib Nisar, took suo moto notice of the killings of Hazaras. In the subsequent hearing on May 11, these targeted killings were termed as ethnic cleansing of the Hazara community and Nisar instructed all the security agencies to submit reports on the forces behind these killings.

Apart from her political activism, Haider has been practicing law at the Balochistan Bar Council for years. She specializes in defending women's rights and provides free legal services to people who cannot afford legal counsel on a wide range of issues, including fair justice, extrajudicial killing, domestic violence, marriage disputes, sexual harassment, and property rights.

In 2018, Haider also met Mr. Ihsan Ghani, National Coordinator, National Counter Terrorism Authority (NACTA) in Islamabad to put forward the grievances of the Hazara women who are facing social, economic and administrative challenges as the male breadwinners of their households have been killed.

Haider has also contributed to the feminist struggle in Balochistan by fighting against the norms of patriarchy and leading all major movements, including the Aurat March.

== Accomplishments ==
In 2014, she was selected as an Atlantic Council Emerging Leaders of Pakistan Fellow and was a member of the first batch of Pakistan Social Entrepreneurs by Rajeev Circle Fellows in 2015. In 2015, Haider was selected as one of ‘News Women Power 50’ list of Pakistan's most influential and powerful women. She was also a 2016 Swedish Institute Young Connectors of the Future Fellow.

She was named in the BBC's 100 Women in 2019 which is a list about inspiring and influential women compiled by BBC. She was chosen as an International Woman of Courage in March 2020 by the US Secretary of State.

She received Hum TV Women Leaders Award 2020, for her achievement in the past year.

== Threats ==
Haider has received criticism from her society and threats and harassment from state and non-state actors for her activism against human rights excesses. In March 2019, Haider's name was put on Pakistan's Exit Control List (ECL) after her participation in the public gatherings of Pashtun Tahafuz Movement.

== See also ==
- Persecution of Hazara people
- Persecution of Hazara people in Quetta

== Sources ==
This article was created during ‘WikiGap’ event, in Islamabad, Pakistan on 11,12 October 2019, organized by Swedish Embassy.
