= 2011 Hazara Town shooting =

Terrorist incident in Pakistan

- Location: 30.1800°N 66.9530°E; Hazara Town, Quetta, Pakistan
- Date: 6 May 2011; 0630 (PST)
- Attack type: Shooting and Rocket attacks
- Deaths: 8
- Injuries: at least 15
- Perpetrator: Lashkar-e Jhangvi (LeJ)

2011 Hazara Town shooting refers to a massacre of Hazara people on 6 May 2011 in Hazara Town, Quetta, Pakistan which left 8 dead and at least 15 wounded. The attack took place early in the morning around 0630 hrs Pakistan Standard Time in a park when people were doing morning exercises, playing cricket and football. Three rockets were fired followed by heavy gunfire. Lashkar-e-Jhangvi (LeJ) claimed responsibility for the attack.

== Background ==
Hazara Town is a Hazara populated neighborhoods of the southwestern city of Quetta in Pakistani province of Balochistan. The Hazaras are mainly Shia Muslims and their neighborhood is surrounded those of other ethnic groups of Sunni sect, Balochs and Pashtuns.

== Shooting ==
The attack took place in an open field park adjacent to Hazara cemetery by Bypass Road. At least 10 armed men with two rocket launchers and automatic assault rifles on three vehicles entered from Brewery Road, took positions on Bypass Road and started shooting. At least three rockets were fired which were followed by heavy gunfire. The shooting lasted 17 minutes after which the assailants fled towards the Shalkot area. By the end of the day, the shooting had left 8 dead and 15 injured.

== Perpetrators ==
The banned Pakistani Sunni extremist militant group Lashkar-e-Jhangvi claimed responsibility for the attacks in Hazara Town. LeJ specifically talked about Hazara Town shooting in one of their night letters distributed in Quetta by LeJ Balochistan Unit. It is believed that it was one of the attacks in revenge of the death of Al-Qaeda leader Osama bin Laden.

== Response ==
The protesters blocked the bypass road and demanded the arrest of the assailants.

The US Embassy in Islamabad also issued a statement condemning the killings:

The senseless killing of innocent civilians is an affront to the people of Pakistan and to all humanity. All must stand together and take resolute action to disrupt, dismantle, and defeat terrorist organisations'.

The Pakistani political parties Muttahida Qaumi Movement and Tehreek Insaf condemned the killings and demanded the arrest of perpetrators from Government of Pakistan.

== See also ==
- 2003 Quetta mosque bombing
- 2004 Quetta Ashura massacre
- 2011 Mastung bus shooting
- Persecution of Hazara people
- September 2010 Quetta bombing
- Quetta attacks
