= Persecution of Hazaras =

Treatment of the Afghan ethnic group

The Hazaras have been the subject of ethnic and religious persecution in Afghanistan for hundreds of years. In the late 1880s and early 1890s, the Hazara genocide was the massacre, enslavement and forced displacement of a significant portion of Hazaras, with some estimates suggesting that up to sixty percent of the Hazara population was affected, though these figures are disputed due to the absence of reliable contemporary census data. In the 20th and 21st centuries, they have also been the victims of massacres committed by the forces of Ahmad Shah Massoud‘s Islamic State of Afghanistan, the Taliban, Afghanistan's Khalqist regime, and al-Qaeda. Hazaras have been systemically killed and discriminated against socially, economically, and culturally with specific intent, argued by some to constitute genocide. The Hazaras primarily come from the central regions of Afghanistan, known as Hazarajat. Significant communities of Hazara people also live in Quetta, Pakistan and in Mashad, Iran, as part of the Hazara and Afghan diasporas.

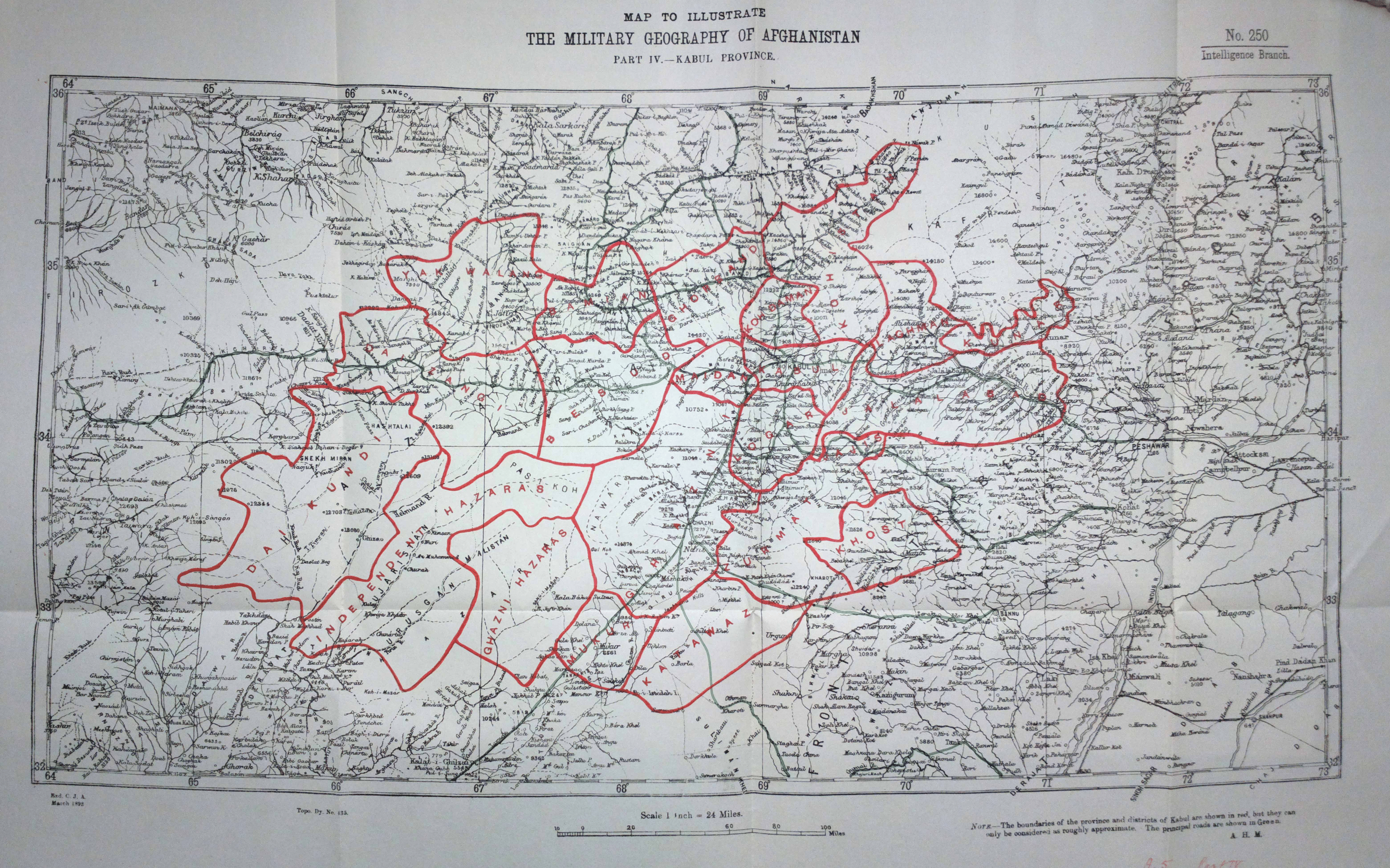
Map of Kabul Province and its surroundings showing the boundaries of the different Hazara tribes in 1893. Between 1888 and 1893, an estimated sixty percent of the Hazaras were massacred or had their land seized by the Pashtuns. As of 2025, Uruzgan Province and many areas that were inhabited by Hazaras until 1893 are mostly inhabited by Pashtuns.

During the reign of Amir Abdur Rahman (1880–1901), tens of thousands of Hazaras were massacred, with many more expelled and displaced. Half the population of Hazarajat was killed or fled to neighboring regions of Balochistan in British India and Khorasan in Iran. This led to Pashtuns and other ethnic groups occupying parts of Hazarajat.

Conditions significantly improved for the Hazaras in Afghanistan during the Republic era, and Hazaras were represented in national government. However, Hazaras still faced discrimination throughout the country and under government policies, including access to infrastructure. Those who lived in the southern provinces of Afghanistan continued to face prejudice at the hands of Pashtuns without repercussion.

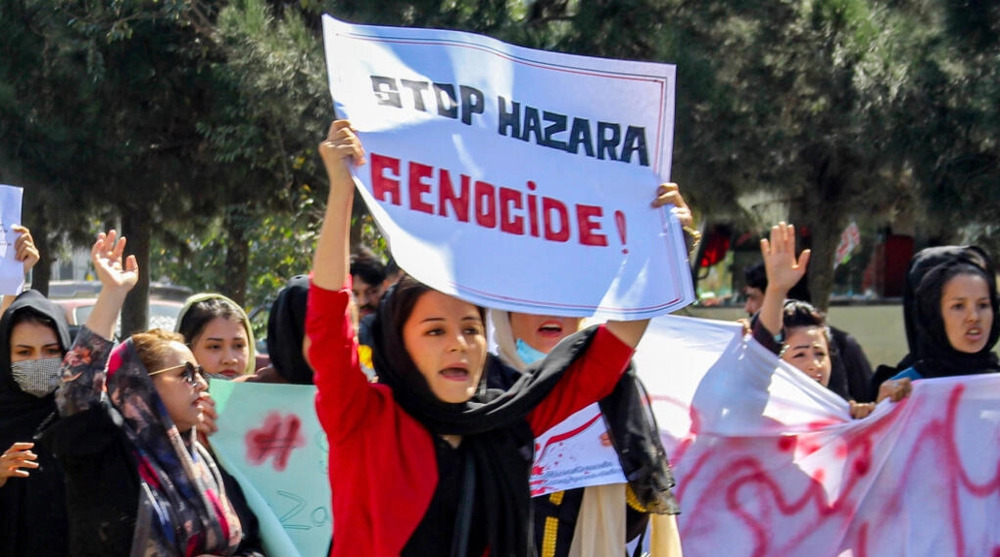
Dozens of women from the Hazara community of Afghanistan protested after a suicide bombing in September 2022, occurred in an educational center that killed more than 52 young girls.

Since 2021, the Hazaras have suffered from widespread ethnic discrimination, religious persecution, and organized attacks by terrorist groups. Under the Taliban, Hazaras face deliberate economic restrictions to weaken and create economic backwardness of Hazara regions. Thousands of Hazaras have been forcibly seized from their ancestral lands and homes and undergo the occupation of pastures by Pashtun nomads and Taliban supporters. The seizure of agricultural fields has forced Hazara farmers to migrate or flee from Afghanistan. Additionally, Hazara girls and women endure harassment and arbitrary arrest, kidnapping, and rape and torture in prison. Numerous cases of human rights violations against Hazaras have caused many Hazaras to be displaced and gradually forced to flee Afghanistan.

The 33-member Taliban-led government of Afghanistan currently excludes any Hazara representation. Despite constituting up to 19% of Afghanistan's population, Hazaras have not been appointed for any ministries, provincial administrations, security commands, or army corps. The Taliban also revoked the Shia Personal Status Law, resulting in the disenfranchisement of the Hazara and Shia community within the country. Other restrictions and sanctions on Hazara include ban on the teaching of Shia Jafari doctrine in higher education, removal of Ashura as a national holiday, and restrictions on Muharram.

== Afghanistan ==
Hazaras are historically the most restrained ethnic group in the state and as a result, they have only experienced slight improvements in their circumstances even with the setup of modern Afghanistan. The discrimination against this ethnic group has continued for centuries, and it has been instigated against them by Pashtuns and other ethnic groups. Sayed Askar Mousavi, estimates that more than half of the entire population of Hazarajat was driven out of its villages, including many who were massacred. "It is difficult to verify this estimate, but the memory of the conquest of the Hazarajat by Abdur Rahman certainly remains vivid among the Hazaras themselves, and it has heavily influenced their relationship with the Afghan state throughout the 20th century. The British from neighboring British India, who were heavily involved in Afghanistan, did not document such a large figure". Others claim that Hazaras began to leave their homeland of Hazarajat in search of employment due to injustice and poverty, mostly during the 20th century. Most of these Hazaras immigrated to neighboring Balochistan, where they were provided permanent settlement by the British colonial government. Others settled in and around Mashad, Iran.

The Hazaras of Afghanistan faced severe political, social and economic tyranny and denial of basic civil rights.

=== Persecution and systematic violence ===
Notably, after the Second Anglo-Afghan War, Abdur Rahman conducted a campaign of repression in Hazarajat, but it was met with fierce opposition by Hazara tribal leaders. The first uprising was conducted in correlation with Abdur Rahman's cousin, Mohammad Eshaq, who sought to overthrow the Amir. This revolt of Hazara nationalists and anti-Amir partisans was brief because Abdur Rahman used sectarian strife to divide the Hazara Shias and the Sunni partisans, thus allowing him to easily defeat his foes.

The defeat of the Hazaras in their first revolt allowed Abdur Rahman to impose taxes on Hazarajat for the first time, and they severely impeded the autonomy of Hazarajat, because numerous Pashtun soldiers and government officials were garrisoned in Hazarajat to ensure its compliance with the Pashtun-run state. Subsequently, the Pashtuns garrisoned in Hazarajat, treated the local Hazaras as inferiors, and often committed arbitrary acts of cruelty and brutality against them. This caused great unrest and a deepening hatred between the Hazaras and their Pashtun rulers, causing the Hazaras to reach their tipping point in 1892.

The outrage that followed allowed the Hazaras to unite once again to overthrow most of the local Pashtun garrisons in Hazarajat. This newfound zealous fever fermented fierce resistance against Abdur Rahman and his forces. Witnessing the rising tide, Abdur Rahman felt he had no choice but to wage a jihad against the Shia Hazaras, and under this casus belli Abdur Rahman was able to muster around 150,000 troops. The resulting conflict was brutal and led to a great loss of life. The Hazaras fought with vigor but the attrition they faced due to lack of rations led to their demise at the uprising's epicenter of Oruzgan.

=== Improvements and recognition ===
Despite the "democratic" 1964 constitution that contained universal suffrage, political and social rights for minorities were still not guaranteed. That decade the first Hazara minister was appointed by the King.

=== Khalqist regime ===
Under the first communist Khalq government, Hazaras were persecuted again, a particular episode being the Chindawol uprising in 1979 when hundreds of Hazaras went missing. Their persecution was not kept secret - for instance, Abdullah Amin, brother of Hafizullah Amin, expressed anti-Hazara comments during a public speech that year stating that “the seeds of Hazaras shall not remain in Afghanistan.” Abdullah Amin was in charge of security in Northern Afghanistan and ran a Khalqist Pashtun militia known as the Kunduz militia which aimed to confiscate land from Non-Pashtuns and redistribute them to ethnic Pashtuns. Amin's militia ran a campaign of terror in Northern Afghanistan with Amin telling Afghan army officers and the Kunduz militiamen to "suppress and annihilate" the Hazaras of Tala wa Barfak District, following up with "Their heads are ours and their property is yours". Amin's forces publicly executed Hazaras near Kunduz by drowning them in ponds. Hazaras made up a disproportional number of victims during the Khalqist regime's rule between April 1978 and December 1979.

=== Soviet occupation ===
Following the Soviet Union's intervention and creation of the Parcham government under Babrak Karmal, Hazara rights improved, and the party's constitution declared all races and ethnicities in Afghanistan as being equal. During the 1980s, Hazaras became more prominent in the army and the ruling communist party, and one Hazara politician, Sultan Ali Keshtmand, would serve as prime minister for most of the decade. The Hazaras were split over the Soviet–Afghan War – most of the urban population supported and fought for the communist regime in Kabul, where they were now officially equal, but most of the rural Hazara population rejected the reforms and resisted.

=== Post-communist era ===
The Hazara Hezb-e Wahdat militia and party joined the new mujahideen government of the Islamic State of Afghanistan, and some members held government posts. However they would soon be discriminated against and would be excluded from the administration. At the same time, violent ethnic conflict broke out between Hezb-e Wahdat and the Saudi-backed Wahhabi Ittihad-i Islami militia led by Abdul Rasul Sayyaf. The Hazara claim the Taliban executed 15,000 of their people in their campaign through northern and central Afghanistan.

==== Afshar ====
In February 1993, a two-day military operation was conducted by the Islamic State of Afghanistan government and its allied Ittihad-i Islami militia. The military operation was conducted to seize control of the Afshar district in west Kabul where the Shia Hezb-e Wahdat militia (which was allied to Gulbuddin Hekmatyar's Sunni Hezb-i Islami and backed by Pakistan) was based and from where it was shelling civilian areas in northern Kabul. The operation also intended to capture Wahdat leader Abdul Ali Mazari. The Afshar district, situated on the slopes of Mount Afshar west of Kabul, is densely populated. The area is predominantly inhabited by Shia Hazaras. The Afshar military operation escalated into what became known as the Afshar massacre when the Saudi-backed Wahhabi militia of Ittihad-e-Islami went on a rampage through Afshar, killing, raping, looting, and burning houses. Two out of nine Islamic State sub-commanders, Anwar Dangar (later joined the Taliban) and Mullah Izzat, were also reported as leading troops that carried out abuses. The Islamic State government in collaboration with the then enemy militia of Hezb-e Wahdat as well as in cooperation with Afshar civilians established a commission to investigate the crimes that had taken place in Afshar. The commission found that around 70 people died during the street fighting and between 700 and 750 people, were abducted and never returned by Abdul Rasul Sayyaf's men. These abducted victims were most likely killed or died in captivity.

==== Mazar-i-Sharif ====
Mazar-i-Sharif Anti-Hazara massacre
- Part of Battles of Mazar-i-Sharif (1997–98)
- Date: August 1998
- Target: Extermination of Hazaras, particularly combat aged males
- Attack type: Genocidal massacre
- Deaths: 2,000 to 20,000
- Perpetrator: The Taliban
- Motive: Anti-Hazara sentiment Anti-Shi'a sentiment

Following the 1997 massacre of 3,000 Taliban prisoners by Abdul Malik Pahlawan in Mazar-i-Sharif thousands of Hazaras were massacred by other Taliban members in the same city in August 1998. The slaughter has been credited to a number of factors—ethnic difference, suspicion of Hazara loyalty to Shia Iran, anger at the loss of life suffered in an earlier unsuccessful Taliban takeover of Mazarwas—including takfir by the Taliban of the Hazaras. After the attack, Mullah Niazi, the commander of the attack and the new governor of Mazar, declared from several mosques in the city in separate speeches:

Last year you rebelled against us and killed us. From all your homes you shot at us. Now we are here to deal with you. (...)
Hazaras are not Muslim, they are Shia. They are kofr [infidels]. The Hazaras killed our force here, and now we have to kill Hazaras. (...)
If you do not show your loyalty, we will burn your houses, and we will kill you. You either accept to be Muslims or leave Afghanistan. (...)
[W]herever you [Hazaras] go we will catch you. If you go up, we will pull you down by your feet; if you hide below, we will pull you up by your hair. (...)
If anyone is hiding Hazaras in his house he too will be taken away. What [Hizb-i] Wahdat and the Hazaras did to the Talibs, we did worse...as many as they killed, we killed more.

At 10 a.m. on 8 August 1998, the Taliban entered the city and for the next two days drove their pickup trucks "up and down the narrow streets of Mazar-i-Sharif shooting to the left and right and killing everything that moved—shop owners, cart pullers, women and children shoppers and even goats and donkeys." More than 8,000 noncombatants were reportedly killed in Mazar-i-Sharif and later in Bamiyan. In addition, the Taliban were criticized for forbidding anyone from burying the corpses for the first six days (contrary to the injunctions of Islam, which demands immediate burial) while the remains rotted in the summer heat and were eaten by dogs. During these killings 2,000 to 5,000, or perhaps up to 20,000 Hazara were systematically executed across the city. The Taliban went door to door of Hazara households searching for combat age males, shooting them and slitting their throats right in front of their families. Hazaras were shoved into trailers where they suffocated to death or they died of heat strokes, and later, their bodies were dumped into piles in the middle of the desert. The Taliban randomly shot anti-aircraft weapons at civilians into the middle of the city; causing drivers to swerve out of control and run people over. Human rights organizations reported that the dead were lying on the streets for weeks before the Taliban allowed their burial due to stench and fear of epidemics. Niamatullah Ibrahimi described the killings as "an act of genocide at full ferocity."

Members of Pakistan's ISI claimed that the killings were only committed after trials; however, the Taliban had Pakistani fighters alongside them during their siege of the city.

==== Robatak Pass ====
The pass connecting the settlements of Tashkurgan and Pule Khumri is known as Robatak Pass. A mass murder was carried out there by the Taliban in May 2000 in which 31 people were reported dead. Twenty-six of the victims were Ismaili Hazara from Baghlan province. Their remains were found to the northeast of the pass, in a neighborhood known as Hazara Mazari, on the border between Baghlan and Samngan provinces. The victims were detained four months before their execution by Taliban troops between January 5 and January 14, 2000.

==== Yakawlang ====
In January 2001 the Taliban committed a mass execution of Hazara people in the Yakawlang District of Bamyan Province in Afghanistan. This started on January 8 and lasted for four days; it took the lives of 170 men. Taliban apprehended about 300 people, including employees of local humanitarian organizations. They were grouped to various assemblage points where they were shot dead in public view. Around 73 women, children, and elderly were taking shelter in a local mosque when the Taliban fired rockets at the mosque. The Taliban also killed two Hazara elders who had approached them to mediate.

==== Bamyan ====
The United Nations investigated three mass graves allegedly containing victims of massacres in 2002 within Bamyan.

=== Islamic Republic (2001-2021) ===
There was a significant improvement in the status and treatment of Hazaras in Afghanistan after the Karzai administration came to power. The new 2004 Afghan constitution recognized them as one of the country's ethnic minorities, and they held full right to Afghan citizenship. Hazaras were well represented in Karzai's government, and in the 2010 Afghan parliamentary election, Hazaras won around 25 percent of the seats. As of 2007, Hazaras have also pursued higher education, enrolled in the army, and many have top government positions. For example, Muhammad Mohaqiq, a Hazara from the Hizb-i-Wahdat party, ran in the 2004 presidential election in Afghanistan, and Karim Khalili became the Vice President of Afghanistan. Since ousting the Taliban in late 2001, billions of dollars have been poured into Afghanistan for several large-scale reconstruction projects that took place in August 2012. For example, there have been more than 5000 kilometers of road pavement completed across Afghanistan, of which little was done in central Afghanistan Hazarajat. On the other hand, the Band-e Amir in the Bamyan Province became the first national park of Afghanistan. The road from Kabul to Bamyan was also built, along with new police stations, government institutions, hospitals, and schools in the Bamyan Province, Daykundi Province, and others. The first ski resort in Afghanistan was also established in the Bamyan Province.

A large degree of discrimination against Hazaras continued. A new danger in the form of ISIS has become especially prominent in recent years, and they have carried out abductions, extortions, and violent killings against Hazaras. The rising power of warlords, who the Hazara people perceive as a direct threat, has also been a matter of concern. There have been ethnic tensions and violent clashes with nomadic Kuchis over land access issues. Taliban fighters continue to abduct and execute Hazaras traveling in vehicles. Furthermore, anti-Hazara sentiments became stronger when the former director of the National Directorate of Security, Amrullah Saleh, accused Iran of interfering in Afghan affairs through Shias. Hazara activists still believe that the government does not serve their people's security needs sufficiently. Parts of central Afghanistan, like the unofficial Hazara capital Bamiyan, are among the country's poorest and often lack even basic necessities like water and electricity. Hazara people held a protest in March 2016 against the government's decision to move a proposed power line project out of Bamiyan, seeing it as another form of ethnic discrimination.

==== 2010 Khas Urozgan attack ====
In June 2010, at least nine Hazara men were killed in an ambush in Khas Urozgan District of Uruzgan Province. The Taliban took responsibility for the attack.

==== 2015 Zabul beheadings ====
In November 2015, Afghan militants claiming loyalty to the Islamic State beheaded seven ethnic Hazara civilians who had been abducted in Zabul Province in southern Afghanistan. Their throats were cut with pieces of metal wire. The victims were four men, two women, and a 9-year-old girl named Shukria Tabassum. The killings sparked off the Tabassum movement of large-scale protests by women and men of multiple ethnicities in November 2015.

==== 2016 Dehmazang bombings ====
On 23 July 2016, two Islamic State suicide bombers blow themselves up during the peaceful protest 'Junbish Roshnaye' in Kabul killing 160 and wounding over 200 people. The attackers were reportedly from the local affiliate of the so-called Islamic State, known as the "Khurasan Province" (IS-Khurasan).

==== 2016 Ashura Attacks ====
18 people were killed and 54 were injured in July 2016 at Kabul's landmark Sakhi Shrine by a gunman wearing an Afghan National Security Forces uniform. The attack took place on the eve of Ashura, the Shia mourning day. Responsibility for the attack was claimed by the Islamic State, or ISIS. The next morning, an improvised electronic device (IED) killed at least 15 Hazara people in the Balkh province of northern Afghanistan. ISIS claimed responsibility for this attack as well. These attacks show the growing threat of the IS to the Hazara people.

==== 2018 University Preparatory Academy Bombing ====
In August 2018, a bomb hit a university preparatory academy in a Hazara neighborhood of Kabul. The bombing, which left 48 dead and 67 others injured, was claimed by ISIS.

==== 2019 Wedding Bombing Attack ====
On August 17, 2019, a wedding of a Hazara couple in Kabul was bombed. Responsibility for the attack, which left 63 people dead and 182 injured, was claimed by ISIS.

==== 2020 Mourning Ceremony Attack ====
On March 6, 2020, a mourning ceremony was held in commemoration of the death of Abdul Ali Mazari, a Hazara leader, in 1995. The commemoration, held in the Dashte Barchi neighborhood of Kabul, was attacked by gunmen, with 32 people killed and between 58 and 81 people injured. According to Nasrat Rahimi, the interior ministry spokesman, all of the casualties were civilians. Responsibility for the attack was claimed by ISIS.

==== 2020 Maternity Hospital Attack ====
On 12 May 2020, gunmen stormed a maternity hospital in Dashte Barchi, a majority-Hazara neighborhood of Kabul. The attack left at least 24 people dead, including two newborns.

==== 2020 Education Center Attack ====
On 25 October 2020, a suicide bomber detonated in the street outside of the Kawsare Danish center, an education centre in a heavily Shia Hazara neighborhood in the Pule Khoshk area of Dashte Barchi in western Kabul. At least 30 were killed and 70 more were injured in the attack. Most of the victims were students between the age of 15 and 26. A Taliban spokesman on Twitter has denied responsibility for the attack. Islamic State, or ISIS, has said it was behind the attack in a statement on Telegram without providing evidence.

==== 2020 Bamyan Bombing ====
On 24 November 2020, two bombs hidden at the side of a road in the city of Bamyan killed 14 and injured 45 others.

==== 2021 Kabul School Bombing ====
On 8 May 2021, a car bombing, followed by two more improvised explosive device blasts, occurred in front of Sayed al-Shuhada school in Dashte Barchi, leaving at least 90 people dead and 240 injured. The majority of the casualties were girls between 11 and 15 years old. Taliban spokesman condemned the attack and held the Islamic State responsible for the attack. The Dashte Barchi district was frequently attacked by the Islamic State – Khorasan Province (ISKP).

==== Mundarakht Massacre ====
On 4–6 July 2021, Amnesty International reported that the Taliban tortured and killed nine Hazara men in the village of Mundarakht, Malistan District. Six of the victims were shot and three more were "tortured to death".

=== Islamic Emirate (2021–present) ===
Since the Taliban returned to power in 2021, the Shia Hazara people of Afghanistan have faced escalated violence, systematic discrimination, and exclusion. The targeted killing and forced displacement of Hazaras has intensified with many unprosecuted. Over a period of 3 years of Taliban rule, there have been 61 targeted attacks against Hazaras including suicide attacks, bomb explosions, beheadings, and mysterious killings. Of these 61 attack, 12 were committed by Taliban forces, 16 by Islamic State in Khorasan Province (ISKP), and one by armed Kuchi nomads. The remaining attacks are unclaimed. 473 Hazara people have been killed and 681 wounded.

In 2022, Human Rights Watch reported that since the Taliban took over Afghanistan in August 2021, the ISKP had claimed responsibility for 13 attacks against Hazaras and had been linked to at least 3 more, killing and injuring at least 700 people. ISKP had repeatedly attacked Hazaras and other religious minorities at mosques, schools, and workplaces.

==== Forced Displacement ====
After October 2021, the Taliban forcibly displaced thousands of Hazara people from their homes in Ghazni, Helmand, Balkh, Daykundi, Uruzgan, and Kandahar. The seized land and homes were most often redistributed to Taliban supporters. According to some estimates, the Taliban have displaced 25,000 primarily-Hazara people from their ancestral lands.

==== Erasure of Hazara leader Mazari ====
On 18 August 2021, the Taliban blew up the statue of Abdul Ali Mazari in Bamyan. The Taliban had killed Mazari, a Hazara leader, in 1995.

On 21 September 2024, the Taliban sparked outrage among Hazaras after demolishing a statue of Mazari and a square dedicated to him in Kabul. The square, named Mazari Square, was located at the Pul-e-Sokhta intersection, an area of mostly Hazaras.

==== Balkhab persecutions ====
On 3 July 2022, in the rural areas around Balkhab District, the Taliban committed a series of war crimes against the local Shia Hazara population, those war crimes include the execution of 150 civilians after they were subjected to prolonged torture, playing music and dancing in Shia Mosques, Shia seminaries, and schools before turning them into military bases, killing Hazaras due to their ethnicity, seizing homes and vehicles belonging to Hazara civilians, causing hundreds of families to flee to the mountains and not allowing aid workers to reach them which led to the death of 3 infants.

==== Kaj Learning Center Massacre ====
On Friday, 30 September 2022, 53 students, mostly young Hazara women, were killed by suicide bombers in the Dast-e Barchi neighborhood of Kabul, which is a predominantly Hazara area.

==== Massacres in 2024 ====
- The following massacres are some, but not a complete list, of massacres specifically targeting Hazaras in Afghanistan in 2024:
- On 6 January 2024, five people were killed and 15 were injured in a minibus with civilians in Dasht-e-Barchi.
- On 11 January 2024, two people were killed and 12 wounded outside a commercial center in Dasht-e-Barchi.
- On 21 April 2024, one was person was killed and 10 were injured in bus targeting Hazara civilians.
- On 29 April 2024, a gunman stormed a Shia and Hazara mosque in Herat Province killing six worshippers, including a child.
- On 12 September 2024, 14 people were killed returning home from visiting shrines in Iraq. ISKP claimed responsibility.

==== Persecution and violence in 2026 ====
In January 2026, the Taliban circulated a new Criminal Procedure Code to courts across Afghanistan, introducing provisions that classify followers of non-Hanafi Islamic schools as “heretics” and repeatedly distinguish between “free” persons and “slaves.”As most Hazaras are Shia Muslims, the regulation places Hazara communities under increased religious and judicial pressure and further institutionalizes discrimination against them.

In June 2026, Taliban morality police arrested dozens of women and girls in Herat, primarily from the predominantly Hazara neighborhood of Jibraeel (Jebrail) on charges of violating the strict dress code. On 9 June, Hazara residents of Jebrail staged a peaceful protest against the arbitrary detentions. Taliban security forces opened fire on protesters – men, women and children – At least two people, including a boy, were killed and more than 20 were injured. Many of the wounded reportedly avoided hospitals out of fear of further arrests.

== Pakistan ==
The history of Hazara people in Pakistan dates back to the 1840s, when Hazara tribesmen from Hazarajat began migration to colonial India because of persecution by Pashtuns. Many Hazaras were enlisted in the British Indian Army, beginning with enlistment into the Presidency armies during the First Anglo-Afghan War. The mass-migration and permanent settlements started in the 1890s when Emir Abdul Rahman Khan started persecuting the Hazaras of Afghanistan. The majority of Hazara are Shi'as with a sizable Sunni Muslims minority. 25-35% of Pakistan's population is Shia Muslim. Sectarian violence in Pakistan started in 20th century. The Pakistani province of Balochistan has witnessed violence against Hazaras for more than a decade and half by militants who consider them heretics.

Throughout the 2000s and early 2010s, Hazaras in Balochistan, Pakistan, faced attacks from militant groups like Lashkar-e-Jhangvi. In the mid-2010s, the security situation improved for Hazaras in Balochistan. However, the improved protection that resulted from the placement of walls and checkpoints around their city has also made their lives difficult.

=== Quetta ===
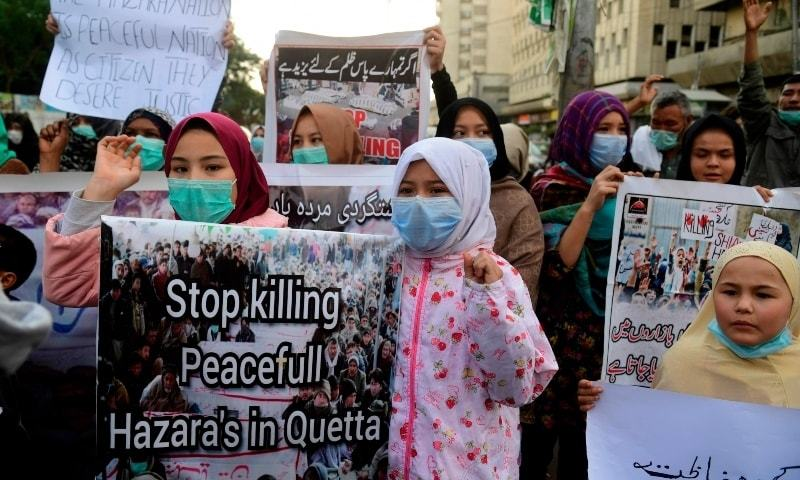
Hazara protest in Quetta, Pakistan, June 2021

In 2011, the persecution of Hazaras in Quetta has left at least 1300 dead and more than 1500 wounded. The victims include high-profile community members, laborers, women and children. One third of the victims are children. The major attacks included assassinations of Hussain Ali Yousafi, Olympia Abrar Hussain, bombing of a Hazara mosque, Ashura massacre, Quds Day bombing, Play ground massacre, Mastung massacre, January 2013 Quetta bombings, February 2013 Quetta bombing, Hazara Pilgrims carnage, Akhtarabad massacre and other terrorist attacks on Hazara People in Quetta.

The Al-Qaeda affiliated Pakistani Sunni Muslim extremist militant group Lashkar-e-Jhangvi, has claimed responsibility for most of these attacks.

In response to these killings, worldwide demonstrations were held to condemn the persecution of Hazaras in Quetta. The Hazara diaspora all over the world, namely in Australia, Western Europe, North America as well as the Hazara in Afghanistan, have protested against these killings and against the silence of international community. Haji Mohammad Mohaqiq, the political leader of the Hazara in Afghanistan, has also expressed solidarity with the Hazara community in Quetta. The persecutions have been documented by the United Nations, Amnesty International, Human Rights Watch, Asian Human Rights Commission, Human Rights Commission of Pakistan and Afghanistan Independent Human Rights Commission. EU parliamentarian Rita Borsellino has urged the international community to address the plight of Hazara people in Quetta. British MPs Alistair Burt, Mark Lancaster, Alan Johnson, and Iain Stewart asked the British government to pressure Pakistani authorities concerning the absence of justice for Hazara community in Pakistan.

As a consequence of the attacks, there has been a recent exodus of Hazaras trying to flee the violence. They are headed mainly to Australia and other Western countries, where thousands of them have taken shelter and successfully relocated after obtaining refugee status. To get there, they complete an illegal and treacherous journey across Southeast Asia through air, land and sea that has already left hundreds of them dead.

On 10 October 2017, two unidentified attackers on a motorcycle opened fire on a van heading for a nearby vegetable market, killing the driver and four others, continuing the trend of attacks against Hazaras in Quetta. This series of bombings, attacks and assassinations have forced Hazaras to retreat to two heavily protected enclaves on either side of the city: Marriabad and Hazara Town.

An attack occurred on the night of 3 to 4 January 2021, in which terrorists slaughtered 17 Hazara persons who were working as miners at Mach.

=== Response ===
In response, many members and leaders of Lashkar-e Jhangvi (LeJ) have been killed in military operations conducted by the Pakistan army and the police. This has led to a significant drop in violence and restoration of law and order in recent times.

On 12 April 2026, four members of the Hazara minority were killed by unidentified gunmen in the Hazarganji area of Quetta, Balochistan province. The attackers fled the scene after the shooting

== See also ==
- List of massacres against Hazara people
- Anti-Hazara sentiment
- Anti-Afghan sentiment
- Anti-Shi'ism
