= January 2014 FATA airstrikes =

Airstrikes on insurgents in the War in North-West Pakistan

- Part of the War in North-West Pakistan
| Date | 20–21 January 2014 |
| Location | Mir Ali, Miramshah and Tirah |
| Result | Pakistani victory |

Belligerents
| Pakistan | Tehrik-i-Taliban Pakistan; Al Qaeda |

Commanders and leaders
| (Pakistan) Nawaz Sharif | Hakimullah Mehsud |

Units involved
| Pakistan Air Force; Pakistan Army: Army Aviation | Tehrik-i-Taliban Pakistan; Al Qaeda |

Casualties and losses
| None | 36–62 killed 15+ wounded |
- 15+ civilians killed 23,000 civilians displaced

January 2014 FATA airstrikes refers to multiple airstrikes carried out in Miramshah, Mir Ali and Tirah valley in Khyber Pakhtunkhwa on January 20 and January 21, 2014.

== Background ==
2014 Bannu bombing, by Taliban killed twenty six Pakistani soldiers. Thirty-eight other people were injured as a result of the bombing. The bomb blast, domestic and international pressure on Pakistani government compelled the government to launch airstrikes, for the first time since 2007.

== Strikes ==
=== January 20 ===
On January 20, 2014, Pakistan Air Force warplanes started the airstrike campaign by bombing multiple insurgent bases in North Waziristan followed by shelling of the targets by Pakistan Army helicopters.

According to Pakistan, 40 insurgents most of which were foreigners including sixteen Uzbek and three German Al-qaeda members were killed. Independent sources reported 39 casualties (24 killed and 15 wounded). Wali Muhammad, a TTP commander, was reported to be killed in these strikes. Pakistan claimed that a huge weapons and ammunition cache was destroyed by the airstrikes. Furthermore, it was reported that residential areas were hit and 15 civilians were killed. More than 23,000 people fled the area amidst fear of more strikes.

=== January 21 ===
The next day, Pakistan Air Force warplanes bombarded insurgent bases in Khyber Agency killing 12 militants. Four militant hideouts were destroyed in the air raid on Tirah valley in Khyber Agency.

== Aftermath ==
Shahidullah Shahid, a spokesman for the Pakistani Taliban, warned that his group would be compelled to take revenge. There was a surge in terrorist activities in Pakistan.

On January 21st 2014 Mastung bus bombing killed 22 Shi'ite pilgrims returning from Iran, 32 were wounded.
