= List of massacres against Hazaras =

The following is a list of massacres that have occurred against Hazaras, an ethnic group who make up the third largest ethnic group in Afghanistan:

Date	Name	Location	Attacker(s)	Deaths	Notes
1888–1893	Suppression of 1888–1893 Uprisings of Hazaras	Hazarajat	Afghan army under Abdur Rahman Khan	Thousands to tens of thousands	
February 11–12, 1993	Afshar Operation	Afshar district, west Kabul	Shura-e Nazar, Islamic State of Afghanistan, Islamic Dawah Organisation of Afghanistan, Islamic Movement of Afghanistan	indeterminate	To counter the shelling, government forces attacked Afshar in order to capture the positions of Wahdat and its leader Mazari, and to consolidate parts of the city controlled by the government. The operation became an urban war zone, when Sayyaf's Ittehad-i Islami forces and Massoud's Jamaat-e-Islami forces committed "repeated human butchery" turning against the Shia Muslims.
July 1998	1998 Mazar-i-Sharif massacre	Mazar-i-Sharif-Balkh Province	Taliban, Hezb-e Islami Gulbuddin	2,000 to 20,000	Taliban forces by aid of Hezb-e Islami Gulbuddin attacked to vast number of Hazaras, after arriving to Mazar-i-Sharif
Between 1999 and 2000	The massacre of Hazaras in Sar-e Pol Province	Sar-e Pol Province	Taliban	indeterminate	
June 25, 2010	The massacre of Hazaras in Zabul Province	Zabul Province	Taliban	9	For collaborating with the government and the spying, Taliban killed 9 Hazaras
December 6, 2011	2011 Afghanistan Ashura bombings	Mazar-i-Sharif, Kabul, Kandahar	Lashkar-e-Jhangvi	78 killed and more than 150 wounded	
July 2, 2015	The massacre of Hazaras in Jalrez District	Jalrez District, Maidan Wardak Province	Taliban by Pashtuns supporting	27 killed and 3 wounded	
July 23, 2016	July 2016 Kabul bombing	Dehmazang Square, Kabul	ISIL	more than 80 killed and more than 231 wounded	
October 11, 2016	The massacre of Hazaras in Sakhi Shrine	Mosque of Sakhi Shrine, Kabul	Haqqani network, ISIL	Approx 18 killed and more than 58 wounded	
October 12, 2016	2011 Afghanistan Ashura bombings	Balkh Province	ISIL	Approx 14 killed and more than 70 wounded	
November 21, 2016	November 2016 Kabul suicide bombing	Baqer-ul Ulom mosque, Kabul	ISIL	Approx 32 killed and more than 64 wounded	
August 1, 2017	2017 Herat mosque attack	adwadia mosque, Herat	indeterminate	Approx 32 killed and more than 70 wounded	
August 1, 2017	2017 Mirza Olang village attack	Mirza Olang village, Sar-e Pol Province	ISKP	Approx 50 killed	
October 20, 2017	2017 Imam Zaman mosque attack	Kabul	ISKP	40 killed	
August 15, 2018	Mawoud Academy	Kabul, Barchi	Taliban, ISIS	48 killed and 67 wounded	
October 27, 2018	2018 Khas Urozgan District attack	Khas Urozgan District, Urozgan Province	Taliban	70 killed and indeterminate wounded	
January 3, 2021	2021 Coal mine attack	Bolan District, Balochistan	ISIS	11 killed	All 11 miners were blindfolded and had their hands tied behind their backs before having their throats slit.
July 4–6, 2021	Mundarakht massacre	Mundarakht, Ghazni province	Taliban	9 Hazara men killed	Taliban used torture and extrajudicial executions to commit the massacre.
January to June 2021	Attacks on the Hazara community	Throughout Afghanistan	Taliban, ISKP, Anonymous terrorist groups	143 killed and 357 injured	
2022	Kaaj girl school bombing	Kabul, Afghanistan	Unknown Alleged Taliban involvement ISKP	at least 53 killed and over 110 injured	A suicide bomber first killed the school guard and then shot at the students, then came in the middle of the classroom and blew himself up. The victims of this attack were Hazara school girls.
2022	After the Balkhab uprising	Balkhab District, Afghanistan	Taliban	Over 150	
2023	Attack on Imam Zaman Mosque in Baghlan	Poli Khumri, Baghlan Province	Taliban and Haqqani network, ISKP	over 17 killed and dozens of people were injured	
2024	Qala-e-Naazir Barchi in Kabul	Barchi, Kabul Province	ISIS	17 killed and over 14 injured	a bomb explosion inside a Toyota Coaster minibus. ISIS claimed responsibility for this terrorist attack.
2024	Jibrail town, Herat province,	Herat Province	ISIS	6 killed	gunmen targeting a "Rickshaw" tricycle in Jabrail town of Herat province
September 12, 2024	Daikundi massacre	between Ghor and Daikundi	ISIS	14 killed, 6 wounded	machine gun attack

== See also ==
- Persecution of Hazaras
- Hazara nationalism
- List of massacres in Afghanistan
- Anti-Hazara sentiment
- Anti-Pashtun sentiment
- Anti-Afghan sentiment
