= 2014 Mastung bus bombing =

Terrorist incident in Pakistan

- Part of Insurgency in Balochistan, Sectarian violence in Pakistan, and Terrorism in Pakistan
- Location of Balochistan in Pakistan
- Location: Mastung District, Balochistan, Pakistan
- Date: 21 January 2014
- Target: Bus
- Weapon: Bomb
- Deaths: 29
- Injuries: 32
- Perpetrator: Lashkar-e-Jhangvi

2014 Mastung bus bombing (Pakistan)

The Mastung bus bombing was a bomb attack on a bus carrying pilgrims returning from Iran on 21 January 2014, while it was passing through Mastung District on the Quetta-Taftan Highway, Pakistan. At least 22 people died and another 32 were wounded in the attack.

== Incident ==
The bus came under attack at 6:15 pm when it crossed the Pakistan-Iran border in Taftan on Quetta-Taftan Highway. During the bombing it was originally confirmed that 22 pilgrims were killed and 32 were injured, eight of which were women. Later on, two injured pilgrims also died due to the severity of their injuries, bringing the number of dead to 24. According to Asadur Rehman Gilani, a homeland security secretary, an estimate of 80 to 100 kilograms of explosives were used to destroy the bus and three other vehicles. The attack was condemned by Prime Minister Nawaz Sharif, President Mamnoon Hussain as well as such parties as the Majils Wahadat-e-Muslimeen and Hazara Democratic Party. Abdul Malik Baloch have reported the attack in which Lashkar-e-Jhangvi claimed responsibility.

== Aftermath ==
On the same day, it was reported that amount of dead have climbed to 29 while the bodies were laid to rest next day at Bahisht-e-Zainab and Bahisht-e-Zahra graveyards which are located at Hazara Town and Quetta. On 23 January, the relatives of the victims held a sit in which continued till Thursday night. As of 24 January 2014, Pakistani law enforcement detained 25 individuals and restricted further travel in the region.

Lashkar-e-Jhangvi claimed responsibility for the attack.
