= Taleh va Barfak =

- Location in Afghanistan
- Coordinates: 35°24′0″N 68°10′0″E
- Country: Afghanistan
- Province: Baghlan Province
- District: Tala wa Barfak District
- Time zone: + 4.30

Taleh va Barfak is a village in Baghlan Province in north eastern Afghanistan.

== See also ==
- Baghlan Province
