= 2004 Quetta Ashura massacre =

Terrorist incident in Pakistan

- Location: Quetta, Balochistan, Pakistan
- Date: 2 March 2004
- Attack type: Hand grenades, Shooting and Rockets
- Deaths: 50
- Injuries: at least 100

The 2004 Quetta Ashura massacre was a terrorist attack on 2 March 2004 during an Ashura procession in the southwestern city of Quetta, Pakistan. At least 50 people were killed and more than 100 wounded.

People going for wudu (ablution) to recite prayers heard gunshots and the noha khwuan in the truck shouted that the people going for wudu should run for their lives.

At the time, Ashura processions were not accompanied by security details. The attack took place in Liaqat Bazaar. Almost all of the victims were Hazara. The attack occurred just after the Karbala Ashura bombings in Iraq.

== Background ==
Shia Muslim processions are held throughout the world to commemorate the martyrdom of Imam Hussain Ibn Ali on the Day of Ashura. Like other parts of Pakistan, Quetta has Shia Muslims who mainly belong to Hazara community. In Quetta, the Ashura procession starts from Alamdar Road, where the Imambargahs gather from around the city mainly from Hazara Town. The procession moves to Mezan Chowk, where prayers are offered, Matam is performed. The process moves to Liaqat Bazaar and ends on Alamdar Road.

== Massacre ==
The Ashura procession was on its traditional route. When it reached the main Bazaar, three terrorists on the roof of a building threw grenades on the participants, followed by firing with automatic weapons before they blew themselves up, which left around 50 people dead and more than 100 injured.

=== Perpetrators ===
The police identified the assailants bodies after DNA tests and investigations. They belonged to Lashkar-e-Jhangvi (LeJ), a banned Pakistani terrorist group. The police arrested a police constable who allegedly allowed the terrorists to use his house to plan the attack.

== Reactions ==
United Nations Secretary General Kofi Annan condemned the attacks.

The, Secretary-General of Organization of Islamic Conference (OIC), Abdulwahed Belkeziz said

Such terrorist acts can only be designed to incite sectarian (Sunni-Shia) strife and infighting among Muslims and to shed their blood.

The Embassy of Japan in Islamabad issued a press release

Japan is deeply shocked and angered by the terrorist bombings in Baghdad and Karbala, Iraq, and the attacks in Quetta that occurred on Tuesday, causing many deaths and injuries. Terrorism cannot be justified on any account. Japan reiterates its firm condemnation of brutal terrorist attacks, which victimize the innocent. I extend my heartfelt condolences to the victims and the bereaved and wish the injured will have a speedy recovery.

Interior Minister of Pakistan, Faisal Saleh Hayat condemned the attack and said

These misguided extremists want to create chaos in the country.

== See also ==
- Persecution of Hazara people
- List of terrorist incidents, 2004
- Quetta attacks
