= Abid Ali Nazish =

Pakistani actor

- Born: 2 January 1972
- Died: 25 January 2012 (aged 40)
- Occupation: Actor

Abid Ali Nazish (2 January 1972 – 25 January 2012) was a Pakistani actor from the Ethnic group Hazara. On 25 January 2012, he was shot and killed while he and two others were driving around in Quetta, Pakistan. He was with the Federal Investigation Agency agent Walayat and the poet Muhammad Anwar. They were all killed. They were reportedly killed by the terrorist organization Lashkar-e-Jhangvi for being Shia. According to Human Rights Watch, over 275 Shia people have been killed in Pakistan since 2008 and no one has been tried yet for any of the target killings.
