= Abrar Hussain (boxer) =

Pakistani boxer (1961–2011)

Abrar Hussain ابرار حسین

Personal information
- Nationality: Pakistani
- Born: Sayed Abrar Hussain Shah; February 9, 1961 Mehrabad Alamdar Road, Quetta, Pakistan
- Died: June 16, 2011 (aged 50) Quetta, Pakistan
- Height: 5 ft 9 in (175 cm)
- Weight: Light-middleweight; Welterweight

Boxing career
- Stance: Orthodox
Medal record
Men's boxing
Representing Pakistan
Asian Games
Gold medal – first place	1990 Beijing	Light middleweight
South Asian Games
Gold medal – first place	1985 Dhaka

Abrar Hussain (Urdu: ابرار حسین; February 9, 1961 – June 16, 2011) was a professional Pakistani welterweight and light-middleweight boxer. Hussain represented Pakistan at the 1984, 1988, and 1992 Summer Olympics. At the 1985 South Asian Games, he won a gold medal for Pakistan in Dhaka. He also won a gold medal in boxing for Pakistan at the 1990 Asian Games. Hussain represented his country at the 1990 Commonwealth Games as well.

He was the deputy director of Pakistan Sports Board and chairman of the Provincial Sports Board in Pakistani province of Balochistan. He was shot dead outside his office in the southwestern city of Quetta on June 16, 2011, by two unknown gunmen on a motorbike He belonged to the Hazara ethnic group and followed the Shia sect of Islam. His killing allegedly had sectarian motives.

== Early life ==
Hussain was born February 9, 1961, in Mehrabad, Alamdar Road, a Hazara ethnic neighborhood in the city of Quetta, Pakistan. Some sources list his birth date as February 9, 1965.

== Career ==
In 1983 Hussain made his international debut in Asian Boxing Championship in Japan where he won a bronze medal.

In 1984 Hussain represented Pakistan in Summer Olympics in Los Angeles. He participated in the men's welterweight event and was ranked 17T.

In 1988, Hussain represented Pakistan in Summer Olympics in Seoul, South Korea. He participated in men's Light-middleweight and was ranked 9T.

In 1992 Hussain represented Pakistan in Summer Olympics in Barcelona, Spain. He participated in men's Light-middleweight was ranked 17T.

In 1985 Hussain represented Pakistan in South Asian Games in 1985 South Asian Games in Dhaka, Bangladesh and won a gold medal.

In 1990 Hussain represented Pakistan in the Asian Games of 1990 and won a gold medal.

== Awards ==
- Sitara-i-Imtiaz (Star of Excellence) by the President of Pakistan in 1989.
- Pride of Performance by the President of Pakistan.
- President's Gold Medal by the President of Pakistan in 1991.

== Death ==
Hussain was shot dead outside of his office near Ayub National Stadium, on June 16, 2011, by unidentified gunmen on a motorbike. He was shot several times and also received a bullet in the head he was rushed to the nearest hospital but died before any medical assistance was given to him. The banned Pakistani sectarian, terrorist militant group Lashkar-e-Jhangvi (LeJ) claimed the responsibility for his killing.

=== Funeral ===
Hussain's body was taken to his home in a procession, and a very large number of people attended his funeral. He was buried in Behesht-e-Zainab Hazara cemetery on Alamdar road, Quetta.

=== Responses ===
No arrests were made by police and a demonstration was held by a large number of people from the Shia Hazara community demanding the arrest of the killers.

The Chief Minister and Governor expressed grief at his death.

The Pakistan Boxing Federation named his death an irreparable loss to the sport. Pakistani boxer Muhammad Waseem expressed grief and said that it was a huge loss. The PBF postponed the national tournaments including NBP National Ranking Tournament in Quetta and the Youth boxing tournament in Karachi.
