= 2010 Quetta Civil Hospital bombing =

Incident in Quetta, Pakistan

2010 Quetta Civil Hospital Quetta bombing
- Location: Quetta, Balochistan, Pakistan
- Date: 16 April 2010
- Target: Hazara people, Shiites
- Attack type: Suicide bombing, firing, target killing
- Weapon: Suicide belt
- Deaths: 12
- Injuries: 47
- Perpetrator: Lashkar-e-Jhangvi
- Motive: Anti-Shi'ism

The 2010 Quetta Civil Hospital bombing occurred on 16 April 2010 in Quetta, Pakistan, killing at least 12 people and injuring 47 people. The injured included Shia Hazara PPP Member of National Assembly Sayed Nasir Ali Shah and his son, at least one security guard, and two Hazara police officers. The bomb exploded when Shah had arrived to condole the death of a Shia bank manager, who was killed by unidentified gunmen earlier.

== Background ==
Pakistan, which has a mostly Sunni population, has seen sectarian attacks against minorities including Shias, who account for about 15–25% of Pakistan's population, and are the followers of the Prophet's progeny. Sunni militant groups like Lashkar-e-Jhangvi and Sipah-e-Sahaba Pakistan which operate in Pakistan have for years targeted minorities including Shias. Hazaras who are predominantly Shia have been targeted since 1998 due to their religious affiliation and Mongolian facial features. Sayed Nasir Ali Shah was the first ever Hazara elected to the National assembly and was expected to visit the hospital.
