= Persecution of Hazaras in Quetta =

Hazaras have experienced a series of ethnically or religiously motivated attacks in Quetta, Pakistan.

Terrorist organisations like Lashkar-e-Jhangvi or Lashkar-e-Taiba have often accepted responsibility for conducting attacks on Hazaras in Pakistan.

Hazaras have been living in Afghanistan before the partition of India since the 1880s. Almost all migrated from Afghanistan due to persecution and genocide by Abdur Rahman Khan and later in the 1990s due to ethnic cleansing by the Afghan Taliban. The Hazaras are easily identifiable because of their Turko-Mongol facial features and high cheek bones.

== Perpetrators ==
Acts of violence involving Sunni Muslims and their Shia counterparts in Pakistan have been evident since the 1980s. They are generally considered to have arisen from attempts by the then national leader, Muhammad Zia-ul-Haq, to legitimise his military dictatorship and from the influx of weapons into the country following the Soviet invasion of Afghanistan. Although the perpetrators often do not claim responsibility for the attacks, expert analysis suggests that in recent times it is the Sunnis who are dominating the aggression and that they are motivated by the ideology of Al-Qaeda.

Quetta, which is the capital of the Pakistani province of Balochistan, has seen numerous of these violent incidents. This is in part because of a separatist movement involving militants from the ethnic minority who desire greater autonomy and also because the Pakistani military is engaged in counter-insurgency operations near to the province's border with Afghanistan, where there is tribal strife that involves the Taliban and allied groups.

It is widely assumed that the Al-Qaeda-affiliated Sunni Muslim extremist militant group, Lashkar-e-Jhangvi (LeJ) and Sipah-e-Sahaba, is behind the attacks on the Hazara community in the region. There are differences of opinion regarding whether LeJ is a breakaway group of a banned former political party, Sipah-e-Sahaba, or simply its armed wing. The LeJ openly issues death threats to Hazaras through newspaper ads and describes them as wajib-ul-qatl (deserving of death). Lashkar-e-Jhangvi operates from sanctuaries in Afghanistan.

Hazaras in Pakistan face isolation due to their ethnic and religious background, enduring daily targeted assassinations and suicide bombings orchestrated by terrorist networks. This situation has gone unnoticed by the United Nations, human rights organizations, and the international community, highlighting the plight of the Hazara community in Quetta, Pakistan.

== Response ==
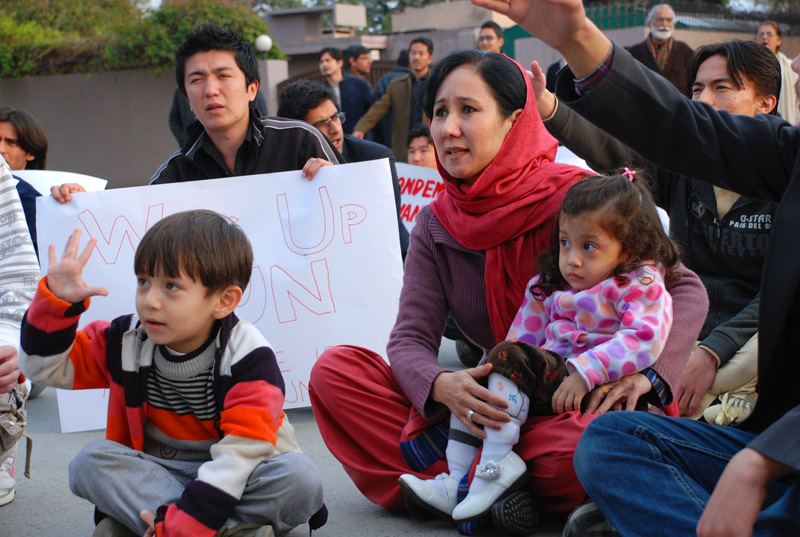
Protest in Islamabad against the persecution of Hazaras, 2013

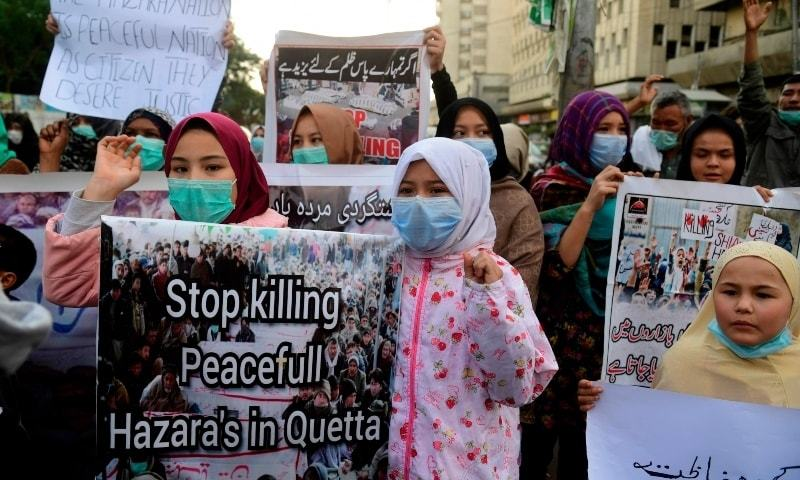
Hazara protest in Quetta, Pakistan, June 2021

Various advocacy groups, such as the Hazara People International Network, have been formed to publicise the situation and promote opposition to it. The Hazara diaspora in Australia, Western Europe and North America have also joined these protests from time to time. Haji Mohammad Mohaqiq, the political leader of the Hazara in Afghanistan, has also expressed solidarity with the Hazara community in Quetta.

The persecution carried out against the Hazara has been documented by the United Nations, Amnesty International, Human Rights Watch, Asian Human Rights Commission, Human Rights Commission of Pakistan and Afghanistan Independent Human Rights Commission.

Former Balochistan chief minister Aslam Raisani was asked to resign by protesters after Mastung Massacre. Senior politicians Mahmood Khan Achakzai, and Sardar Akhtar Mengal condemned the killings and demanded that the security establishment take stern action against those involved in terrorism and acts of violence against civilians.

Hazaras have also asked the government to deploy soldiers in Quetta to provide them protection from the attacks. Many Hazaras demanded that Pakistan army should take control of the province.

In response, many members and leaders of Lashkar-e Jhangvi (LeJ) have been killed in operations conducted by the army and the police.

== Timeline of attacks ==
=== 2001 ===
February 9:

Eight passenger were shot dead and five severely wounded when they were traveling in a van en route from Hazara Town to Alamdar Road. Later, Lashkar-e-Jhangvi claimed responsibility for the attack.

=== 2003 ===
June 8:

Twelve Young Hazara police cadets were killed when two assailants opened fire on their vehicle. The attack occurred on Saryab Road and left nine others injured.

July 4:

Fifty five people were killed and over 150 were injured in an attack on worshipers during Friday Prayers on Mekongi road Quetta.

=== 2004 ===
March 2:

At least 60 people were killed and more than 100 critically injured when a religious procession of the Shia Muslims was attacked with extensive open-firing which followed an explosion by rival Sunni extremists at Liaquat Bazaar in Quetta on Tenth of Muharram. Lashkar-e Jhangvi claimed the responsibility.

=== 2007 ===
January 10: Agha Ghulam Ali, aged 25, owner of the famous fruit juice outlet in Pakistan. His father Agha Abbas had also been murdered by the same Sunni Muslim terrorist organization in May 2002.

=== 2010 ===
September 3:

At least 73 people were killed and 206 injured when a bomb exploded during a rally.

April 16:

On April 16, 2010, a suicide bomber killed 12 people and injured 47, including MNA Syed Nasir Ali Shah, his son, his guards, a journalist and two police officials, in an attack on Quetta's Civil Hospital. The attack took place after the body of Ashraf Zaidi, a Shia bank manager, shot dead earlier in the day by extremists, was brought to the hospital. The attackers evidently targeted the hospital knowing that members of the Shia community and their elected MNA would be gathering at the hospital in the aftermath of Zaidi's killing. LeJ claimed responsibility for the attack.

=== 2011 ===
May 6:

Eight died and fifteen were wounded in the early morning when armed men fired rockets at Hazara children playing outside in an open field. Many children were also among the victims.

June 16:

Abrar Hussain, the Pakistani Olympian boxer and Chairman Balochistan Sports Board, was assassinated near Ayub National Stadium in Quetta.

August 31:

Thirteen died and twenty-two were wounded when a suicide bomber blew himself up in the morning of Eid near Hazara Eid Gah. Four women and two children were also among the dead.

September 20:

A bus carrying pilgrims to Taftan was stopped in Mastung near Quetta, after identifying Hazara passengers they were massacred leaving 26 dead. Three more were shot dead when they were on their way to collect the bodies.

September 23:

Five more Hazara were casualties in an attack when unidentified gunmen opened fire on a van.

=== 2012 ===
January 26:

Three Hazara men were shot dead in Quetta. Two of the victims were public servants and the third one Abid Ali Nazish, was a television artist.

March 29:

A taxi carrying passengers from Hazara Town was sprayed with bullets, which killed seven and injured six. Three women and some children were also among the casualties. This was the third attack on the community in just one week. Two boys under 16 were shot dead by the police as they tried to disperse angry protesters blocking traffic, raising the death toll to nine.

April 3:

Two Hazara men were shot dead in Mekongi road, Quetta, Lashkar-e-Jhangvi (LeJ) claimed responsibility for the attack.

April 9:

Six men were killed by unidentified gunmen on Prince road.

April 12:

Three businessmen, one Tea trader and two Ice cream parlour owners, were gunned down in the busiest bazaars of the city, in two separate incidents.

April 14:

Eight Hazara men were killed on their way to work when armed assailants opened fire on a taxi carrying them on Brewery road.

April 21:

Two brothers were shot dead on Brewery road near SBKW University adjacent to Hazara Town, Quetta. The paramilitary Frontier Corps later arrested three suspects with the help of locals.

May 15:

Two brothers were killed when unidentified gunmen opened fire on them while they were standing in the line outside Passport issuing office on Joint road, Quetta.

June 28:

15 people were killed and 45 others injured, when a suicide attack occurred on a bus in Quetta which had just returned from Iran carrying 60 pilgrims including scores of women and children belonging to the Hazara community. Among the dead were four women and two children.

November 6:

"Assailants on a motorcycle opened fire on a yellow taxi cab on Spinny Road": 3 Hazaras killed, 2 injured.

=== 2013 ===
10 Jan 2013:

Several bombings took place in the southwestern Pakistani in the city of Quetta, where four separate explosions a few minutes apart in the evening ripped through a snooker hall Alamdar Road in a neighborhood dominated by ethnic Hazara Shiites, killing at least 115 people in total and wounding more than 270. The first explosion happened inside the hall, and a vehicle was blown outside the club by one of the attackers on the arrival of police officers and journalists. The second explosion killed five police officers along with one cameraman. Due to the overabundance of casualties, the hospitals were overwhelmed. It was, according to one Hazara leader, the worst attack in Quetta in 14 years. Lashkar-e-Jhangvi, a sunni terrorist organization, has claimed the responsibility of these attacks.

16 Feb 2013:

A big bomb blast at Kirani Road near Hazara Town of Quetta killed 73 and wounded at least 180 people from Shia community. The deadly bombing comes after 36 days of Governor Rule in Balochistan that was imposed following Alamdar Road's twin bombings on Jan 10 in Quettawhich had claimed more than 100 lives of Hazara people.

Banned sunni terrorist outfit Lashkar Jhangvi (LJ) claimed responsibility for the bombing.

30 June 2013:

At least 33 Hazaras were killed (including 9 women and 4 children) and over 70 seriously injured (15 in critical condition) when Al-Qaeda affiliated terrorists carried a suicide attack and exploded an improvised explosive device in a crowded area in Ali Abad, Hazara Town area. The attacks were meters away from Abu Talib mosque near Balakhi Chowk (4-way) in Ali Abad. The attack, once again, has happened despite the fact that the entire area is cordoned off by security agencies and every person entering the area is checked. Al-Qaeda affiliated Lashkar-e Jhangvi (LEJ) terrorists called the news agency NNI and claimed responsibility for the attack.

== See also ==
- Persecution of Hazaras
- Target killings in Pakistan
- Sectarian violence in Pakistan
- Ethnic cleansing of Hazaras (1888-93)
