= Hazara genocide =

19th-century genocide in Afghanistan

- Part of Pashtun colonization of northern Afghanistan
- Location: Hazarajat, Emirate of Afghanistan
- Date: 1888–1893
- Target: Hazaras
- Attack type: Ethnic cleansing, genocide, rape, slavery
- Deaths: Tens of thousands
- Victims: Estimate: 50 to 62% of the Hazara population of Hazarajat killed and displaced.
- Perpetrator: Afghan army under Abdur Rahman
- Motive: Ethnic prejudice, anti-Shi'ism, and colonization

The Hazara genocide occurred in the Hazaristan area of contemporary Afghanistan in the aftermath of the Second Anglo-Afghan War, when the Emirate of Afghanistan signed the Treaty of Gandamak. The Afghan emir, Abdur Rahman Khan set out to bring the Turkistan, Hazaristan, and Kafiristan regions under Afghan control. He launched several campaigns in the Hazarajat due to resistance to oppression from the Hazaras, culminating in the Battle of Uruzgan and he conducted a widespread genocidal campaign against its population.

The Hazaras are a Shi'a Muslim minority in a predominantly Sunni Muslim country. This religious difference has contributed to their historic marginalization and made them targets of sectarian violence. Over 60 percent of the total Hazara population was killed or displaced with some being displaced and exiled by migrating to British India and Iran and other adjoining areas. The Hazara land was distributed among loyalist villagers of nearby non-Hazaras. The repression after the uprising has been called the most significant case of genocide or ethnic cleansing in the history of modern Afghanistan.

== First uprising ==
The first Hazara uprising against Abdur Rahman took place between 1888 and 1890. When Abdur Rahman's cousin, Mohammad Eshaq, revolted against him, tribal leaders of the Sheikh Ali Hazaras joined the revolt. The revolt was short-lived and crushed as the Emir extended his control over large parts of Hazarajat. Leaders of the Sheikh Ali Hazaras had allies in two groups, Shia and Sunni. Abdur Rahman took advantage of the situation, pitting Sunni Hazara against the Shia Hazara, and made pacts among the Hazara.

After all of Sheikh Ali Hazaras' chiefs were sent to Kabul, opposition within the leadership of Sawar Khan and Syed Jafar Khan continued against the government troops, but at last, were defeated. Taxes were imposed and Afghan administrators were sent to occupied places, where they subjugated the people with abuses. People were disarmed, villages were looted, local tribal chiefs were imprisoned or executed, and the better lands were confiscated and given to Kochi people (nomads).

== Second uprising ==
The second uprising occurred in the Spring of 1892. According to Sayed Askar Mousavi, the cause of the uprising was an assault on the wife of a Hazara chieftain by Afghan soldiers. The families of both the man and his wife killed the soldiers involved and attacked the local garrison. Several other tribal chiefs who supported Abdur Rahman now turned against him and joined the rebellion, which rapidly spread through the entire Hazarajat. In response to the rebellion, the Emir declared a "jihad" against the Shias and raised an army of up to 40,000 soldiers, 10,000 mounted troops, and 100,000. He also brought in British military advisers to train his army.

The large army defeated the rebellion at its center, in Oruzgan, by 1892 and the local population was massacred with some being displaced.

"thousands of Hazara men, and women were sold in the cities of Kabul and Qandahar, while numerous towers of human heads were made from the defeated rebels as a warning to others who might challenge the rule of the Amir".

— S. A. Mousavi

Abdur Rahman ordered that all weapons of the Hazara be confiscated and for Sunni Mullahs to impose a Sunni interpretation of Islam.

== Third uprising ==
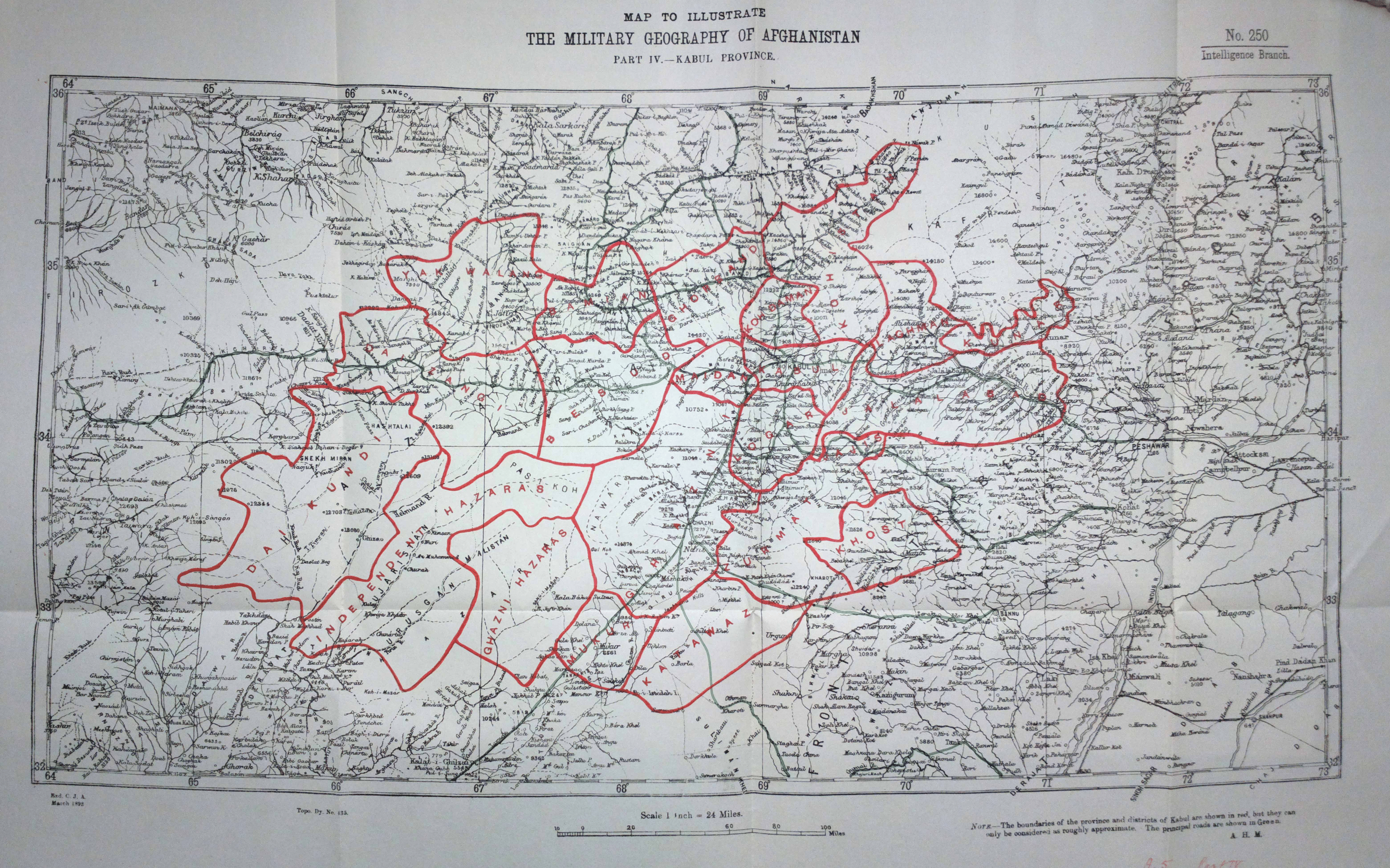
Map of Kabul Province in 1893, showing the boundaries of the different Hazara tribes at the time of the third uprising.

The third uprising of Hazara was in response to excessive taxation, starting in early 1893. This revolt took the government forces by surprise and the Hazara managed to take most of Hazarajat back. During the revolt the Hazaras arrested or killed the governor of Gizu; the governor of Uruzgan tried to plead to the Hazaras that the Amir would listen to their demands. The provincial forces responded to the revolt with military force; in this response the Hakim of Gizu reported to the governor general of Balochistan that General Mir Atta Khan at Gizu committed "great excesses" in Gizu. Hazaras also managed to commit great success in the First Battle Of Uruzgan, where Hazara forces managed to defeat 2 waves of Afghan attacks in Uruzgan

After the revolt unfolded; Hazara tribal leaders like Muhammad, Karbala-i-Raza and others were arrested after trying to flee. Abdur Rahman kept various Hazara chiefs as hostages in Kabul; yet eventually sent them back to Uruzgan; after the revolt was crushed they were then sent back to Kabul again. After months of fighting, the uprising Hazaras were eventually defeated due to a shortage of food; in response to such food shortages Abdur Rahman ordered grain be sent from Herat to Uruzgan. Small pockets of resistance continued to the end of the year as government troops committed atrocities against civilians and deported entire villages. The governor of Balochistan reported to the foreign department of India that he believed Abdur Rahman was intending to exterminate the Hazaras. Massive forced displacements, especially in Oruzgan and Daychopan, continued as lands were confiscated and populations were expelled or fled. Out of 132,000 families, 10,000 to 15,000 Hazara families fled the country to northern Afghanistan, Mashhad (Iran), and Quetta (British India), and 7,000 to 10,000 Hazaras submitted to Abdur Rahman, and the rest fought until they were defeated. However, according to other sources the number of Hazara families displaced alone were much higher than these figures at 400,000 with 80% of those being displaced having been killed or enslaved. There is a famous story of 40 Hazara girls in Uruzgan committing suicide to escape sex slavery during the persecution. 9,000 Hazara women were enslaved in Kabul alone. 30 mule loads; or roughly over 400 decapitated Hazara heads (Note: 30 mule loads is roughly 30 sets of 150 pounds or 2.25 tons; a human head weighs 10.5 pounds on average) were allegedly sent to Kabul. The Sultan Ahmad Hazara tribe of Uruzgan was in particular severely persecuted. The Beshud Hazara tribe too faced the brunt of Amir's crackdown in particular as well.

It is estimated that more than sixty percent of the Hazara population were massacred and some displaced and exiled during Abdur Rahman's campaign against them. Hazara farmers were often forced to give up their property to Pashtuns and as a result, many Hazara families had to leave seasonally to the major cities in Afghanistan, Iran, or Pakistan to find jobs and a source of income. Quetta in Pakistan is home to the third largest settlements of Hazara outside Afghanistan. Sayed Askar Mousavi, estimates that more than half of the entire population of Hazarajat was driven out of their villages, including many who were massacred. Encyclopædia Iranica claims: "It is difficult to verify such an estimate, but the memory of the conquest of the Hazārajāt by ʿAbd-al-Raḥmān Khan certainly remains vivid among the Hazāras themselves, and has heavily influenced their relations with the Afghan state throughout the 20th century." In 1894 802 Hazara leaders who survived the rebellion were killed or exiled after being captured.

Others claim that Hazaras began leaving their hometown of Hazarajat due to poverty and in search of employment mostly in the 20th century. Most of these Hazaras immigrated to neighboring Balochistan, where they were provided permanent settlement by the government of British India. Others settled in and around Mashad, in the Khorasan Province of Iran.

== Legacy ==
The Hazara diaspora mourns the deaths of the victims of the Hazara uprisings of the 1890s on September 25 (called the "Hazara Black Day") and it wants the International community to recognize the subjugation of the Hazaras as a genocide.

== See also ==
- List of massacres of Hazaras
- Persecution of Hazaras
- Persecution of Hazara people in Quetta
- 1998 Mazar-i-Sharif massacre
- Anti-Hazara sentiment
- Genocide of Afghans during the Soviet-Afghan War
