= Tala wa Barfak District =

Tala wa Barfak تاله وبرفک
- District
- Location within Afghanistan
- Coordinates: 35°16′48″N 68°22′48″E
- Country: Afghanistan
- Province: Baghlan
- Capital: Tala wa Barfak

Population (2012)
  - Total: 29,400

Tala wa Barfak (Dari: تاله و برفک) is a district situated in the most southwestern part of Baghlan province, Afghanistan, and its capital is Tala wa Barfak village.
