= September 2010 Quetta bombing =

2010 bombing in Quetta, Pakistan

- Location: 30.36°N 67.02°E; Quetta, Balochistan, Pakistan
- Date: 3 September 2010
- Target: Hazara people, Shiites
- Attack type: Suicide bombing, shooting
- Weapon: Suicide belt
- Deaths: 73+
- Injuries: 200
- Perpetrator: Lashkar-e-Jhangvi
- Motive: Anti-Shi'ism

The September 2010 Quetta bombing occurred on 3 September 2010 in Quetta, Pakistan. More than 73 people were killed and 206 injured when a bomb exploded in a Quds Day procession which Shias were carrying out to express solidarity with Palestinians.

== Background ==
Pakistan, which has a mostly Sunni population, has seen sectarian attacks against minorities including Shias, who account for about 25-35% of Pakistan's population, and are the followers of the Prophet's family. Two days prior to these attacks dozens of Shias were killed in a similar attack in Lahore. Sunni militant groups like Lashkar-e-Jhangvi and Sipah-e-Sahaba Pakistan which had operated in Pakistan have for years targeted minorities including Shias.

On the day prior to this attack Pakistan's interior minister Rehman Malik had asked the Shia community not to hold large gatherings due to security concerns.

== Attack ==
The procession was to mark the Quds Day event staged every year by the Shia community to oppose Israel's occupation of Jerusalem. The rally drew an estimated 2,500 participants, mostly Shias. The size of the blast caused a stampede. The explosion occurred in the Meezan chowk area of the town. The bomb exploded around 3:05 pm local time. It was estimated that the suicide bomber used about 15 kilograms of explosives.

=== Responsibility ===
Lashkar-e-Jhangvi claimed responsibility for the attack and said a 22-year-old suicide bomber, Rashid Moaawia, carried out the attack.

== Aftermath ==
Following the blast, widespread protests erupted in the city with gunfire being heard across the city. Several shops were burnt by the protesters. People were seen lying on the roads to avoid gunfire, while others set fire to vehicles and buildings to vent their anger.

After the blast, police cordoned off the area and fired in the air to hold back people trying to search for their relatives. Shops and schools remained closed the following day. Security was also stepped up at mosques across Pakistan. Thousands attended a funeral mass in Quetta.

== Reactions ==
Prime Minister Yousaf Raza Gillani condemned the attack and ordered an investigation. Interior Minister Rehman Malik told the press that militants want to encourage sectarianism in an effort to destabilise the government following a series of military offensives against them. He also claimed that Punjabi, such as Lashkar-e-Jhangvi, and al-Qaida and the Tehrik-e-Taliban are one and the same. Shiite Conference, Balochistan announced a 40-day mourning period in line with Shia custom.

UN Secretary General Ban Ki-moon's spokesman said "These attacks, which deliberately targeted Shiite Muslims and killed or injured scores of civilians, are unacceptable."

Condemning the attacks the White House stated "To target innocent civilians during the Muslim holy month of Ramadan at an already difficult time as the country is working hard to recover from terrible flooding caused by monsoons makes these acts even more reprehensible."

== See also ==
- Sectarian violence in Pakistan
- List of terrorist incidents in Pakistan since 2001
- Persecution of Shia Muslims
- Persecution of Hazara people
- Quetta attacks
