= Mari Abad =

Residential town in the city of Quetta, Balochistan, Pakistan

Mariabad Gulshani Hazara
- Town
- Location within Pakistan
- Coordinates: 30°10′52″N 67°01′59″E
- Country: Pakistan
- Province: Balochistan
- District: Quetta District

Government
  - Nazim: Mohammad Raza Wakil, Mirza, Bostan Kishtmand
  - Wazir: From Hazara Democratic Party (Abdul Khaliq Hazara)
  - Political Leader: Tahir Khan Hazara

Population (2018)
  - Total: 500,000
- Time zone: UTC+5 (PST)

Mariabad is an inner eastern suburb of Quetta, capital of Pakistan's Balochistan province.

It is the most populous area of Quetta, with a population of almost half a million. It is home to a significant population of ethnic Hazara people.

.
