= Lashkar-e-Jhangvi =

Defunct Deobandi designated terrorist organization

- لشکر جھنگوی
- Flag of the Lashkar-e-Jhangvi
- Founders: Riaz Basra †; Malik Ishaq †; Akram Lahori (executed); Ghulam Rasool Shah †
- Leaders: Riaz Basra †; Malik Ishaq †; Akram Lahori (executed); Ghulam Rasool Shah †; Asif Chotu †; Qari Mohammad Yasin †
- Spokesperson: Ali Abu Sufyan
- Dates active: 1996–2025
- Dissolved: 2026
- Split from: Sipah-e-Sahaba Pakistan
- Country: Pakistan (until 2024); Afghanistan (until 2025)
- Allegiance: Afghanistan (until 2025)
- Headquarters: Afghanistan (until 2025)
- Active regions: Pakistan (until 2024); Afghanistan (until 2025)
- Ideology: Sunni Islamism; Deobandi jihadism Islamic fundamentalism Takfirism; Anti-Shi'ism; Anti-Hazara sentiment
- Status: Inactive/Defunct (Banned in Pakistan)
- Size: Unknown
- Wars: Terrorism in Pakistan; Insurgency in Khyber Pakhtunkhwa; Insurgency in Balochistan; MQM militancy; Sectarian violence in Pakistan; Syrian civil war

Lashkar-e-Jhangvi (LeJ) (Note: Urdu: لشکر جھنگوی, lit. 'Army of Jhangvi') was a Deobandi militant organization that was driven by a Takfiri anti-Shia ideology which operated in Pakistan, while being based in southern Afghanistan. LeJ was an offshoot of anti-Shia party Sipah-e-Sahaba Pakistan (SSP). LeJ was founded by former SSP activists such as Riaz Basra, Malik Ishaq, Akram Lahori, and Ghulam Rasool Shah. LeJ operated in Pakistan and southern Afghanistan until 2024.

LeJ had claimed responsibility for various mass casualty attacks against the Shia community in Pakistan, including multiple bombings that killed over 200 Shia Hazara in Quetta in 2013. It had also been linked to the Mominpura Graveyard attack in 1998, the abduction of Daniel Pearl in 2002, and the attack on the Sri Lankan cricket team in Lahore in 2009. A predominantly Punjabi and Pashtun group, LeJ had been labelled by Pakistani intelligence officials as one of the country's most dangerous terrorist organizations in the country.

Riaz Basra, the first Emir of LeJ, was killed in a police encounter in 2002. He was succeeded by Malik Ishaq, who was killed along with Ghulam Rasool Shah in another police encounter in Muzaffargarh in 2015.

LeJ was banned by Pakistan in August 2001. LeJ remained active until 2024, and had been designated as a terrorist organization by Australia, Canada, Iran, Pakistan, United Kingdom, United States, the European Union, NATO, and the United Nations.

== Formation ==
Riaz Basra, along with Akram Lahori and Malik Ishaq, separated from Sipah-e-Sahaba and formed LeJ in 1996 because they had considered Sipah-e-Sahaba to "not be violent enough".

One source stated that "Almost the entire leadership" of the group, was made up of "people who had fought in Afghanistan", referring to Pakistanis who had fought in the Soviet–Afghan War and Afghan Civil War (1989–1992).

The newly formed group took its name from Sunni cleric Haq Nawaz Jhangvi who was involved in anti-Shia violence in the 1980s, and also one of the founders of the Sipah-e-Sahaba Pakistan (SSP). LeJ's founders believed that the SSP had strayed from Jhangvi's ideals. Jhangvi was killed in an attack by Shia militants in 1990.

Malik Ishaq, the operational chief of LeJ, was released after serving 14 years by the Supreme Court of Pakistan on 14 July 2011, after the Court dropped 34 of the 44 charges against him, involving the killing of around 100 people, and granted him bail in the remaining 10 cases due to lack of evidence. In 2013, Ishaq was arrested at his home in Rahim Yar Khan in the Punjab province.

== Attacks ==
LeJ initially directed most of its attacks against the Pakistani Shia Muslim community. It also claimed responsibility for the 1997 killing of four American oil workers in Karachi. LeJ had attempted to assassinate Pakistani Prime Minister Nawaz Sharif in 1999. Riaz Basra himself was killed in 2002 during a failed attack he was leading on a Shia settlement near Vehari, Multan. Basra was killed due to the cross-fire between his group and the police who were assisted by armed local Shia residents.

- In April 1999, the nephew of the then Ahmadi Caliph Mirza Tahir Ahmad was assassinated. Some have since alleged the attack was carried about by LeJ.
- In March 2002, LeJ members bombed a bus, killing 15 people, including 11 French citizens.
- On 17 March 2002, at 11:00 am, two members of LeJ bombed the International Protestant Church in Islamabad during a church service. Five people were killed, including two American women, two Pakistanis and an Afghan man. Forty-one more people were injured, including 27 foreigners. In July 2002, the Pakistani police killed one of the alleged perpetrators and arrested four LeJ members in connection with the church attack. The LeJ members confessed to the killings and said the attack was in retaliation for the US attack on Afghanistan.
- On 8 June 2003, 11 Hazara police cadets were killed and 9 were injured in a shooting attack by two men on a motorcycle. LeJ was suspected by the police to have been behind the attacks.
- On 4 July 2003, 53 Hazara Shias were killed and at least 65 others were injured when a mosque was attacked during the Friday prayer in Quetta, Balochistan, Pakistan. When hundreds of worshipers were offering Friday prayer, three armed men entered the Asna Ashari Hazara Imambargah and started shooting and throwing hand grenades and one suicide bomber blew himself up - which left 53 dead and scores injured. Hundreds of worshippers were offering Friday prayer at the Asna Ashri Hazara Imambargah when five men, armed with automatic weapons, entered the mosque and fired on worshippers for ten continuous minutes and tried to throw a grenade, but it exploded in an attacker's hand. Worshippers disarmed one of the attackers and killed a third one. The other two attackers ran away from the roof. This attack left more 65 dead and tens of others injured.
- On 2 March 2004, during the month of Muharram, an Ashura procession in the southwestern city of Quetta was moving along its traditional route and when it reached the main bazaar, three terrorists on the roof of a building threw grenades on the participants, followed by firing with automatic weapons before they blew themselves up, which left around 50 people dead and more than 100 injured. The police identified the assailants bodies after DNA tests and investigations and found that they belonged to LeJ. The police arrested a police constable who allegedly allowed the terrorists to use his house to plan the attack.
- The Pakistani government Interior Ministry said that the suicide bomber involved in the assassination of Benazir Bhutto, along with the death of 20 others in Rawalpindi, may have belonged to LeJ, on 27 December 2007.
- Pakistani authorities believed that Mohammed Aqeel, an LJ member, was the mastermind behind the March 2009 attack on the Sri Lanka national cricket team.
- On 16 April 2010 in Quetta, Balochistan, at least 12 people were killed and 47 people injured during a bombing at the Quetta Civil Hospital. The injured included Shia Hazara PPP Member of National Assembly Sayed Nasir Ali Shah and his son, at least one security guard, and two Hazara police officers. Sayed Nasir Ali Shah was the first ever Hazara elected to the National assembly and was expected to visit the hospital. The bomb exploded when Shah had arrived to condole the death of a Shia bank manager, who was killed by unidentified gunmen earlier.
- On 3 September 2010, more than 73 people were killed and 206 injured when a bomb exploded at a Quds Day procession in Quetta which Shias were carrying out to express solidarity with Palestinians. LeJ claimed responsibility for the attack and said a 22-year-old suicide bomber, Rashid Moaawia, carried out the attack.
- LeJ claimed responsibility for 2011 Hazara Town shooting in Quetta. At least 10 armed men with two rocket launchers and automatic assault rifles on three vehicles entered from Brewery Road, took positions on Bypass Road and started shooting, with at least three rockets were fired which were followed by heavy gunfire which lasted 17 minutes after which the assailants fled towards the Shalkot area. By the end of the day, the shooting had left 8 dead and 15 injured. LeJ specifically talked about Hazara Town shooting in one of their night letters distributed in Quetta by LeJ Balochistan Unit. It is believed that it was one of the attacks in revenge of the death of Al-Qaeda leader Osama bin Laden.
- LeJ claimed responsibility for the 2011 Mastung bus shooting which killed 26 Shia pilgrims on 20 September 2011 in the Mastung area of Balochistan. The pilgrims were travelling on a bus to Iran. In addition, 2 others were killed in a follow-up attack on a car on its way to rescue the survivors of the bus attack.
- Afghan President Hamid Karzai blamed LeJ for a bombing that killed 59 people at the Abu Fazal shrine in the Murad Khane district of Kabul on 6 December 2011. Most of the dead were pilgrims commemorating Ashura, the holiest day in the Shias.
- LeJ claimed responsibility for 13 lives lost in brutal attack on Shia pilgrims in Quetta on 28 June 2012. At least 13 people including two women and a policeman were killed and over 20 others injured on in the bomb attack on a bus mainly carrying Shia pilgrims returning from Iran. Most of the pilgrims belonged to the Hazara community.
- LeJ claimed responsibility for January 2013 Pakistan bombings in Pakistan killing, 125 people.
- LeJ claimed responsibility for February 2013 Quetta bombings in Pakistan, killing 81 and wounding 178, mostly Shia people.
- LeJ claimed responsibility for 15 June 2013 Quetta attacks in Pakistan.
- LeJ claimed responsibility for the failed January 2014 attempted bombing of a school which killed one of its students, Aitzaz Hasan in Pakistan.
- LeJ claimed responsibility for January 2014 Mastung bus bombing in Balochistan, killing 28 people from the Hazara Community.
- LeJ claimed responsibility of assassination of Pakistani politician Shuja Khanzada in August 2015.
- LeJ claimed responsibility for 23 December 2015 Parachinar bombing which killed 25 people and injured another 62.
- LeJ claimed responsibility for attack on Police training center Quetta in Balochistan on 24 October 2016, killing at least 61 people including cadets and army officers and injuring more than 165.
- Both LeJ and the Islamic State claimed responsibility for the 12 April 2019 Quetta bombing killing 21 people including at least 10 Hazaras, nine of whom were Shias, and two paramilitary soldiers of FC, one of whom had died of his wounds four days later on 16 April. A spokesperson of LeJ, Qari Saifullah, told CNN "We claim responsibility for the attack in Quetta, we targeted the Hazara community." ISIL also claimed the responsibility of this attack, and released a photograph of the bomber along with his name.
- LeJ was alleged to have play a role in an attack on a Pakistan Army check post in the Makin district of South Waziristan in December 2024. Despite this, other groups such as the TTP (Pakistani Taliban), claimed responsibility. This attack led to an escalation in the already violent 2024 Afghanistan–Pakistan clashes.

== Headquarters ==
Officials from Zabul Province had claimed that LeJ had a sanctuary in southern Afghanistan. Early on in 2016, LeJ leader Yousuf Mansoor Khurasani had survived an insider attack in southern Afghanistan.

=== After dissolution/desolation ===
After the groups dissolution/desolation in 2024, LeJ's remnants had fled to Southern Afghanistan.

In 2025, following two separate agreements between Pakistan and Afghanistan, where they agreed to not allow terror attacks from their soil on each other's territories, LeJ's remnants had either withdrew from or scattered around Southern Afghanistan after several arrests of its former and remaining members.

Although the Taliban have launched sweeping efforts at disarmament, including unprecedented house-to-house searches to hunt for weapons and confiscate materiel, the Taliban's way of handling of the group aims at containing them without provoking them to turn against the Taliban's government.

== Affiliations ==
LeJ had ties to the Pakistani Taliban (TTP), the Islamic Movement of Uzbekistan (IMU), Sipah-e-Sahaba Pakistan (SSP), Ahle Sunnat Wal Jamaat (ASWJ), Islamic State – Khorasan Province (IS-KP), al-Qaeda, and Jundallah.

=== Relationship with Al-Qaeda ===
An investigation had found that al-Qaeda had been involved with the training of LeJ.

Upon the death of Riaz Basra in May 2002, correspondence between al-Qaeda and LeJ had seemed to have stopped.

== Designation as a terrorist organization ==
The Government of Pakistan had designated LeJ as a terrorist organization in August 2001. The U.S. classified LeJ as a Foreign Terrorist Organization under U.S. law in January 2003, and its finances were then blocked worldwide by the U.S government.

== Decline ==
The organization came to decline in the early 2020s with much of its leadership killed, captured or executed by Pakistani Security Forces or its rival Shia militant groups (such as Sipah-e-Muhammad and Tehreek-e-Jaffaria).

LeJ also faced competition from other Sunni militant/insurgent organizations in Pakistan such as the Pakistan Taliban, Lashkar-e-Islam, Tehreek-e-Jihad Pakistan, Al-Qaeda in the Indian subcontinent, Islamic State – Khorasan Province, and the Islamic State – Pakistan Province.

The last leader of the group, Akram Lahori (alias Muhammad Ajmal) was arrested in southern Iran in February 2024. Before his arrest, he was granted bail by a Pakistani anti-terrorism court in October 2023. In Iran, he had been pronounced guilty of terrorism for his involvement in an anti-Shia terror group, attending bomb-making training courses and plotting terror attacks in Iran. He was sentenced to death by Iranian authorities under the anti-terror law.

On 6 September 2024, the Naeem Bukhari group from LeJ, whose leader was Ata-ur-Rehman (alias Naeem Buhkari), who also had ties to Al-Qaeda while also once being arrested, declared his group's allegiance to the Pakistan Taliban. The Pakistani Taliban, through its Umar Media channel, announced that all members of the network/group had pledged their allegiance to its leader, Mufti Noor Wali. Hafiz Qasim Ghazi, the leader of Bukhari’s faction, led the group’s formal merger with the Pakistani Taliban. The Pakistani Taliban also called on other jihadi/militant groups in Karachi to follow suit. Reports suggest that the number of factions aligned with the Tehrik-e-Taliban Pakistan (Pakistani Taliban) has grown to 60, with the Naeem Bukhari group from LeJ being the latest addition.

=== Last major incidents ===
The last two official major incidents with the organization were in March and September 2024, when several of its remaining members were arrested or killed by security forces during intelligence-based counterterrorism operations in Jhang and other cities.

==== Individuals from multiple groups arrested ====
On 3 August 2024, the Counter Terrorism Department (CTD) of Punjab arrested three people who were associated with three separate banned organizations from three separate locations, in order to thwart "a significant terror plot". These were:

- Abdul Wahab from Chakwal, who was associated with LeJ (LeJ).
- Saifullah from Faisalabad, who was associated with ISPP (Islamic State – Pakistan Province).
- Khurram Abbas from Khushab, who was associated with SMP (Sipah-e-Muhammad Pakistan).

The CTD recovered large caches of prohibited materials from those arrested, including 1,625 grams of explosives, three hand grenades, two IED bombs, three detonators, eight feet of safety fuse wire, 12 pamphlets, 10 stickers, and Rs 22,250 in cash.

==== Arrest of CTD officer's murderers ====
In a media statement on 7 October 2024, officials of Pakistan's CTD, including Deputy Inspector General Sheikh and In-charge Raja Umar Khattab, identified the murderers of a CTD officer as 30-year-old Usman Qureshi, son of Ayub Qureshi, and 35-year-old Hafiz Qasim Rashid, son of Abdul Rashid Hazravi. Both were suspected members of the LeJ, which operated in conjunction with the Tehrik-e-Taliban Pakistan (TTP). They were prime suspects in the killing of DSP Ali Raza, who was gunned down near Faisal Market, Karimabad, in July 2024.

==== Alleged involvement in ambush ====
In December 2024, an attack took place in the Makin district of South Waziristan on a Pakistan Army check post. Several media sources stated that the attack was carried out by LeJ, but the Tehrik-e-Taliban Pakistan (TTP) officially claimed responsibility.

Pakistani security officials believe that former members of LeJ were also involved in this attack. According to the officials, following the dissolution of LeJ, its various clandestine cell systems have joined either the TTP, ISKP or ISPP.

=== End of official encounters and attacks ===
After these, the organization has claimed no attacks and none have been reported by Pakistani authorities and is considered defunct. Experts have described the decline of organization as a significant boost for the government of Pakistan against terrorism.

== See also ==
- List of Deobandi organisations
- Ansar Al-Mujahideen
- List of designated terrorist organizations
- Madhe Sahaba Agitation
- Anti-Shi'ism
- Genocide of Kashmiri Shias
- Persecution of Hazara people
- Persecution of Hazaras in Quetta
- Persecution of Shias by ISIL
- Syed Ahmad Barelvi
- Sipah-e-Sahaba Pakistan
