= Hazara Town =

Residential town in Quetta, Balochistan, Pakistan

Hazara Town آزره ټاون شهرک هزاره
- Location within Pakistan
- Coordinates: 30°10′27″N 66°57′39″E
- Country: Pakistan
- Province: Balochistan
- District: Quetta District

Area
  - Total: 980 km^{2} (380 sq mi)

Population (2026)
  - Total: 600,000
- Time zone: UTC+5 (PST)

Hazara Town (Urdu: ہزارہ ٹاؤن, Hazaragi: آزره ټاون, Dari: شهرک هزاره) is a lower- to middle-income area on the western outskirts of Quetta, Pakistan, of which almost all the residents are ethnic Hazaras, with a small population of Pashtuns and Baloch.

Hazara Town encompasses nine blocks, beginning at Brewery Road near Bolan Medical College and continuing to Kirani road.

== History ==
New Hazara Town, like the twin suburb of Mehrabad, has built up over the last century due to chronic food deficiency in the Hazaristan region of Afghanistan and the persecution of Hazara people by Abdur Rahman Khan, Amir of Afghanistan in the late 19th century.

=== From 1878–1891 ===
Following the Second Anglo-Afghan War, the first Hazaras came to Quetta to seek employment in British-run companies under the Raj. They are thought to have worked on the building of roads and the Bolan Pass railway as well as enlisting in the British army of India. At that time, there could have been no more than a few hundred Hazaras in Balochistan. The subjugation of Hazarajat by Afghan emir Abdur Rahman Khan, between 1891 and 1893, triggered a mass exodus of Hazaras to Turkistan, Khorasan and Balochistan.

=== From 1901 to 1933 ===
The situation in Afghanistan returned to normal under Habibullah (1901–1919), the son of Abdur Rahman. He offered amnesty to the Hazaras but this proved to be of little help in improving the lot of the Hazara in Afghanistan. Many Hazara were reluctant to return to Afghanistan and determined to rebuild their lives in Quetta. In 1904, the 106th Hazara Pioneers, a separate regiment for the Hazaras formed by the British, offered greater careers prospects, social recognition and economic success.

The area was established in 1908 by Haji Nasir Ali (an ethnic Hazara, for whom Nasirabad is named) who bought the land from a Kirani Moudodi Chishti Syed family and built housing there. Many ethnic Hazaras from Afghanistan who came earlier were living in different areas of Quetta moved to the settlement, attracted by cheaper land and the security of the scheme.

=== From 1933 to 1971 ===
The regiment of Hazara Pioneers was disbanded in 1933. Deprived of this social and professional outlet, Hazaras went to settle in Quetta between the 1930s and 1960s, although the process of migration never completely dried up.

=== From 1971 to 1978 ===
Following the 1971 drought, Hazaras settled in Quetta or went to Iran in search of work. Between 1973 and 1978, conflict over the Pushtunistan issue between Pakistan and the Afghan regime, was another factor of Hazara migration to Pakistan, since President Daud Khan of Afghanistan saw the Hazara as Pakistan's allies. Following the Communist coup in April 1978 and the Soviet intervention in December 1979, the migratory movement assumed hitherto unprecedented dimensions.

"The area was established in 1982 by Haji Ali Ahmed (an ethnic Hazara) who bought the land from a Kirani Baloch family and built housing there. Many ethnic Hazaras from Afghanistan and who were living in different areas of Quetta moved to the settlement, attracted by cheaper land and the security of the scheme."

== Population ==
The population of Hazara Town is approximately 800,000, who are mostly Hazara, but there are also some other evening ethnicities living in Hazara Town. The other ethnicities such as Persian-speaking Pashtons and Sayeds also live among the Hazaras in Hazara town. "The community of Hazara Town is a distinct minority in Baluchistan, which is dominated ethnically by Baloch and is predominantly shia muslims." Ethnic Hazaras are a majority in Quetta, at about 40% of the total population. They speak Hazaragi as their mother tongue and practice Shi'a Islam. The population of Hazara town increases rapidly which requires wider residential areas.

Most of the houses in Hazara Town are constructed of concrete.

== Educational institutes ==
There are more than 80 primary, middle and high schools. According some rough surveys literacy rate in Hazara Town is estimated around 80%. Majority of schools are run by private sector. Only two schools, one boys & one girls schools are run by government funds. Several schools ran by Afghan refugees inline with the Afghanistan Ministry of Education syllabus are also located in Hazara Town. These school are exclusively for the Afghan students who migrated to Pakistan as refugees.

- Sardar Bahadur Khan Women University
- Bolan Medical College

== Economy ==
Majority of the population in Hazara Town most of the people financially depend on the profession of labourers such as in mining, construction and fruit selling.

== Sports ==
There are several sports complexes built by the residents of Hazara Town. These complexes include futsal grounds, volleyball grounds, gyms and martial arts establishments.

Below are some prominent Hazara sportsmen and sportswomen from Hazara Town:

- Kulsoom Hazara
- Rajab Ali Hazara

== Notable people ==
Below are some prominent personalities from Hazara Town:

- General Musa Khan served as Commander in Chief of the Pakistani Army from 1958 to 1966. He also served as Governor of West Pakistan
- Abdul Khaliq Hazara heads the Hazara Democratic Party (HDP) political party
- Politician Hussain Ali Yousafi, chairman of the HDP, was killed by unknown gunmen in 2009, in the city of Quetta
- Syed Nasir Ali Shah is a member of Pakistani National Assembly from NA-259

== See also ==
- Mehr Abad
- Hazara Democratic Party (HDP)
- 106th Hazara Pioneers
