= 2015 Sadr City market truck bombing =

Terrorist attack in Iraq

Sadr City market truck bombing
- Part of War in Iraq (2013–2017)
- Location: 33°23′20″N 44°27′30″E; Sadr City, Baghdad, Iraq
- Date: 13 August 2015
- Target: Shiite civilians
- Attack type: Mass murder, truck bomb
- Weapon: Truck bombs
- Deaths: At least 76
- Injuries: At least 212
- Perpetrator: Islamic State

On 13 August 2015, a truck bombing attack was launched targeting a Baghdad food market in Sadr City, a predominantly Shi'ite neighborhood.

== Attack ==
On 13 August 2015, shortly after 06:00 local time (03:00 UTC), a bomb-packed refrigeration truck was detonated in Sadr City. As of 13 August 2015, at least 76 people were confirmed to have been killed in the bombing, with at least 212 more injured. The market in the Shi'ite neighborhood is one of the biggest in Baghdad selling wholesale food items. This incident caused much resentment against the government for the continued terror attacks in the city.

== Responsibility ==
Islamic State (IS) claimed responsibility for the attack, stating that "God has enabled the soldiers of the Islamic State to detonate a parked, booby-trapped truck amid a gathering of apostates in one of their most important Shiite majority strongholds, in Sadr City." According to the group, the attack targeted members of Iraq's Popular Mobilization Forces, largely comprising Shi'ite militias allied with the Iraqi government. However, CNN reported the top United Nations official in Iraq, Gyorgy Busztin, as saying that the victims were "innocent civilians."

== Aftermath ==
In response to the attack, local residents attacked police and security responders, blaming the government for continued attacks in Baghdad.

Shiite lawmaker Hakim al-Zamili, head of Iraq's parliamentary security committee, called for a review of security procedures, including the establishment of local patrols, as well as enhancing the country's intelligence capabilities.

== See also ==
- 2015 Khan Bani Saad bombing
- List of Islamist terrorist attacks
- List of terrorist incidents, 2015
- List of terrorist incidents linked to the Islamic State
- Timeline of the Iraq War (2015)
- Persecution of Shias by the Islamic State
