= 2016 Saudi Arabia bombings =

Suicide bombings in Medina, Saudi Arabia

- Location: Medina, Jeddah and Qatif, Saudi Arabia
- Date: 4 July 2016; 10 years ago
- Attack type: Car bombing, suicide bombing, terrorist attack
- Deaths: 4 (+4 perpetrators, including Fayaz Kagzi)
- Injuries: 7

On 4 July 2016, four suicide bombs exploded in three locations in Saudi Arabia. One of these exploded in the parking lots of the Al-Masjid an-Nabawi, killing at least four people. The second and third suicide bombers targeted a Shia mosque in Qatif, but they failed to harm anyone but themselves. A fourth militant blew himself up after police tried to arrest him near the U.S. consulate in Jeddah. Two Saudi Arabian police officers were injured.

== Background ==
The Saudi Arabian attacks were the fourth attempt at the mass killing of civilians by suspected ISIS-affiliated militants during Ramadan 2016, following the 28 June attack in Istanbul, Turkey, the 1 July attack in Dhaka, Bangladesh, and the 3 July bombings in Baghdad, Iraq.

In 2015, Saudi Arabia was hit by a number of attacks claimed by the Islamic State of Iraq and the Levant. Attacks included the Qatif and Dammam mosque bombings on 22 and 29 May 2015, in which 26 were killed and 106 were injured, and the 2015 Abha mosque bombing on 6 August 2015, killing 15.

== Attacks ==
According to a press release by the Saudi Press Agency, the official news agency of Saudi Arabia, "Security spokesman of the Interior Ministry said in a statement that before the prayers of Maghrib in Madinah on Monday 09/29/1437 AH, security men suspected a person while he was heading to the Prophet's Mosque through a vacant lot of land used as a parking space for visitors' cars. When they intercepted him, he blew himself by an explosive belt, which resulted in his death, the deaths of four security men, and the injury of five other security men. On the evening of the same day at a mosque near Mias market in Qatif, a suicide bombing occurred. Human remains of three people were found and are currently in the process of being identified. Security agencies are still investigating the two crimes."

=== Al-Masjid an-Nabawi attack ===
The bomb that exploded in the parking lot of the Al-Masjid an-Nabawi reportedly killed four security officers and injured five others. Taie bin Salem bin Yaslam al-Saya'ari, a Saudi citizen who lived and studied in New Zealand between 2008 and 2013 is thought to have planned the attack. He was killed by Saudi security forces in January 2017.

== Responsibility ==
No group has claimed responsibility for the attacks but the Islamic State was initially suspected.

Saudi Arabia's interior ministry claimed that a man named Abdullah Gulzar Khan carried out the bombing near the U.S. consulate, located in Jeddah. According to the ministry, Khan had been living in the Red Sea city of Jeddah for 12 years working as an immigrant driver. He was living along with his family and parents in Jeddah. The ministry arrested 19 people, including 12 Saudi nationals, following the attacks. A 26-year-old Saudi man, Naer Moslem Hammad Al Balawi, who had a "history of drug use", was identified as the perpetrator of the Medina attack.

== Reactions ==
=== States ===
- Egypt – The Foreign Ministry said the reported attack during the Muslim holy month of Ramadan near one of Islam's most sacred places confirms that terrorism "knows no religion or belief or any meaning of humanity".
- Pakistan - Pakistan Prime Minister Nawaz Sharif condemned the terrorist attacks in Saudi Arabia and called for an international anti-terror response, telling reporters that "The government and people of Pakistan are deeply shocked and saddened over the terrorist attacks in holy land and share the pain and grief of their Saudi brethren".
- UAE – A Foreign Ministry official in the UAE was quoted in the state-run WAM news agency as saying the stability of Saudi Arabia "is the main pillar of the stability of the United Arab Emirates and the whole of the Gulf Arab region".
- Indonesia – Indonesian President Joko Widodo condemned the terrorist attack, saying they violated religious and human values.

=== International organizations ===
- (Organisation of Islamic Cooperation) The secretary-general of the 57-nation Organization of Islamic Cooperation, which is headquartered in Saudi Arabia, says the attacks are an attempt to destabilize the kingdom. Iyad bin Amin Madani says the kingdom's security is "the cornerstone of security and stability in the region and the Islamic world".

=== Others ===
The apparent attempt to target the Al-Masjid an-Nabawi (Prophet's Mosque) in Medina, the burial place of Muhammad and considered the second holiest site in Islam, brought condemnation from both Sunni and Shia religious leaders worldwide, and even other extremist groups such as Hezbollah and the Taliban. Medina was one of Muhammad's favorite places, and "harming the people of Medina" is explicitly forbidden under Islamic law. This was the first suicide bombing ever to have taken place in Medina. Furthermore, the Prophet's Mosque is non-denominational by definition, as its foundation predates the schism between the Sunni and Shia branches of Islam. An attempted attack against this target, especially taking place just before Eid al-Fitr, was thus seen by commentators to be "an attack against all Muslims".

== See also ==
- Terrorism in Saudi Arabia
