= 2015 Abha mosque bombing =

Suicide bombing by the Islamic State in Abha, Saudi Arabia

2015 Saudi Arabia attack
- Part of Military intervention against ISIL
- Location: 18°13′1″N 42°30′19″E; Abha, Asir, Saudi Arabia
- Date: August 6, 2015
- Attack type: Suicide bombing
- Deaths: 17
- Injuries: 1
- Perpetrators: Islamic State; Hejaz Province

The 2015 Abha mosque bombing occurred on 6 August 2015, when a suicide bomb attack killed 17 people at a mosque in the south-western Saudi Arabian city of Abha.

Responsibility for the attack, in a city near Saudi Arabia's southern border with Yemen, a country presently torn apart by the Yemeni Civil War, was claimed by a self-described affiliate of Islamic State of Iraq and Syria calling itself Wilāyat al-Ḥijāz.

== See also ==
- Qatif and Dammam mosque bombings
- 2015 Arar attack
- Kuwait mosque bombing
- Terrorism in Saudi Arabia
- List of terrorist incidents, 2015
