= Simon Cumbers =

Irish journalist

- Born: 23 January 1968; Ireland
- Died: 6 June 2004 (aged 36); Saudi Arabia
- Cause of death: Shooting
- Burial place: Redwood Cemetery, Greystones, County Wicklow, Ireland
- Monuments: Simon Cumbers Media Fund
- Citizenship: Ireland
- Education: St Patrick's Classical School
- Occupation: Journalist
- Years active: 1988–2004
- Employer(s): BBC News & Freelance
- Known for: Covering dangerous news stories
- Title: Print and broadcast journalist, TV news producer, TV cameraman
- Spouse: Louise Bevan
- Website: simoncumbersmediafund.ie

Simon Cumbers (23 January 1968 – 6 June 2004) was an Irish cameraman for the BBC News in the United Kingdom. He was shot and killed by a gunman in a terrorist attack while reporting in As-Suwaidi, Riyadh, Saudi Arabia. His colleague Frank Gardner, who was also shot, survived the terrorist attack but was left paralysed.

== Personal life ==
Simon Cumbers was the son of Robert (Bob) and Bronagh (Brona) Cumbers. The couple raised their two boys Simon and Stephen and two girls Eimear and Catraoine in Navan, County Meath, Ireland. Simon Cumbers was educated at St. Patrick's Classical School.

Cumbers married Louise Bevan, a journalist for BBC News 24 and BBC Radio 5 Live.

Cumbers was 36 years old at the time of his murder and he was buried at Redwood Cemetery, Greystones, County Wicklow, Ireland.

== Career ==
While a student at St Patrick's, he was editor of the school magazine, Tuairim; features writer for Drogheda Independent, Ipswich Evening and Meath Chronicle; and hosted a radio show for Royal County Radio, a local pirate radio station. He started reporting for The Weekender. Around the age of 20, he started as a rookie and advanced to chief reporter for Capitol Radio (now called FM104) in Dublin, Ireland. In 1990, Cumbers moved to the United Kingdom to work with a variety of British broadcasters, including ITN's Channel 4 News, Channel 4 Daily, Sky News, APTN, and the BBC. Cumbers worked both as a journalist and a producer. In the late 1990s, he retrained and became a cameraman as well, establishing Locum Productions with his wife and BBC journalist Louise Bevan, to supply camera crews to broadcasters. Among the stories Cumbers reported on were the 1989 death of Nicolae Ceaușescu during the Romanian Revolution; the 1990 release of Brian Keenan in Beirut, Lebanon; the late 1990s Drumcree conflict; the Good Friday Agreement and Omagh bombing in 1998, the Kursk submarine disaster in 2000, and the 2004 Madrid train bombings. He had also interviewed Muammar Gaddafi in Libya.

== Death ==
Simon Cumbers was killed in Al-Suwaidi, Saudi Arabia shown relative to the capital Riyadh.

Journalist Frank Gardner and Cumbers were assigned to report on the aftermath of the May 2004 Yanbu attack and Khobar massacre terrorist attacks in Saudi Arabia, both of which had British casualties. The British Foreign Office had advised against nonessential travel there. On Sunday morning, the team arrived in the As-Suwaidi neighbourhood of Riyadh, an ultraconservative area where Al-Qaeda was known to have a presence.

The team was in place reporting between 10 and 30 minutes and a man, later identified as Adel al-Dhubaiti, greeted the journalists and then opened fire on them. This was followed by shooting from five others who were waiting inside a van. Cumbers was killed at the scene, while Gardner attempted escape but was seriously injured. Cumbers' killer was later sentenced to death.

Cumbers' death was considered a murder in the UK. In Saudi Arabia, Adel al-Dhubaiti was arrested in 2004. He was tried, found guilty, and sentenced to death in November 2014, and executed on 2 January 2016. Cumbers' parents spoke out against his execution.

Gardner wrote a book, Blood and Sand, published in 2010, about his reporting in Saudi Arabia and the attack on him and Cumbers.

== Context ==
A week before Gardner and Cumbers reported from Saudi Arabia, twenty-two foreigners were taken hostage and killed by a faction of Al-Qaeda during a shooting rampage, known as the Khobar massacre, in an eastern oil hub. The attack was an attempt by Islamic radicals to try to drive out foreigners. This act of violence made oil prices increase rapidly. The leader of the attack was Abdel Aziz al-Muqrin.

Later in the same month that Cumbers was killed, US citizen Paul M. Johnson Jr was taken hostage and beheaded in Saudi Arabia.

== Impact ==
A year after Cumbers' death, Irish Aid established the Simon Cumbers Media Fund in honour of his memory. The fund's aim is to help, assist, and promote better quality media coverage of issues in the Irish media.

Cumbers was one of the 48 British and Irish journalists who were killed while reporting abroad between 2001 and 2010.

== Reactions ==
Koïchiro Matsuura, the director-general of UNESCO, condemned the attack. His statement said, "I condemn this attack which targeted two media professionals carrying out their professional work, and who were investigating the ruthless al-Qaeda terrorist network. It is no coincidence that the enemies of freedom and democracy attack media professionals whose work upholds the values of freedom, enshrined in the United Nations Charter, and of freedom of expression, guaranteed by the Universal Declaration of Human Rights."

UK Prime Minister Tony Blair said, "We have to be vigilant and get out and get after them and make sure we deal with this (terrorism) issue."

A spokesperson for the Committee to Protect Journalists said, "We deplore this deadly attack on our colleagues and call on Saudi authorities to apprehend the perpetrators and bring them to justice in a timely manner."

Stewart Purvis, a former chief executive of ITN, said, "These are tragic circumstances and they are very dangerous for any media presence in Saudi Arabia."

== See also ==
- Terrorism in Saudi Arabia
