= List of terrorist incidents in 2015 =

This is a list of terrorist incidents which took place in 2015, including attacks by violent non-state actors for political motives. Note that terrorism related to drug wars and cartel violence is not included in these lists. Ongoing military conflicts are listed separately.

== List guidelines ==
- To be included, entries must be notable (have a stand-alone article) and described by a consensus of reliable sources as "terrorism".
- List entries must comply with the guidelines outlined in the manual of style under MOS:TERRORIST.
- Casualties figures in this list are the total casualties of the incident including immediate casualties and later casualties (such as people who succumbed to their wounds long after the attacks occurred).
- The casualties listed are the victims, perpetrator casualties are listed separately (e.g. x (+y) indicate that x victims and y perpetrators were killed/injured).
- Casualty totals may be underestimated or unavailable due to a lack of information. A figure with a plus (+) sign indicates that at least that many people have died (e.g. 10+ indicates that at least 10 people have died) – the actual toll could be considerably higher.
- If casualty figures are 20 or more, they will be shown in **bold**. In addition, figures for casualties more than 50 will also be **underlined**.
- In addition to the guidelines above, the table also includes the following categories:

0 people were killed/injured by the incident.
1–19 people were killed/injured by the incident.
20–49 people were killed/injured by the incident.
50–99 people were killed/injured by the incident.
100+ people were killed/injured by the incident.
An unknown number of people were killed/injured by the incident.

== List ==
Date	Type	Dead	Injured	Location	Article	Details	Perpetrator	Part of
3–7 Jan	Massacre	Unknown; Est. 2000+	Unknown	Baga, Borno State, Nigeria	2015 Baga massacre	Boko Haram militants opened fire on villages.	Boko Haram	Boko Haram insurgency
5 Jan	Suicide bombing	3 (+2)	2	Arar, Saudi Arabia	January 2015 Arar attack	Two gunmen, one strapped with a suicide vest, ambushed a border guard patrol along the border with Iraq, killing two guards and injuring one. The guards were able to return fire and kill one of the gunmen, and afterwards the other one detonated his vest.	ISIL (suspected)	
6 Jan	Suicide bombing	1 (+1)	1	Istanbul, Turkey	January 2015 Istanbul suicide bombing	A female suicide bomber detonated her explosives in front of a police station, killing one officer and wounding another.	DHKPC	DHKP/C insurgency in Turkey
7 Jan	Car bomb	37 / 38	66	Sana'a, Yemen	January 2015 Sana'a bombing	A car bomb detonated in front of a police academy.	al-Qaeda in the Arabian Peninsula (suspected)	Yemeni Civil War
7 Jan	Mass shooting	12	11	Paris, France	Charlie Hebdo shooting	Two heavily armed gunmen entered the offices of satirical news magazine Charlie Hebdo.	al-Qaeda in the Arabian Peninsula	Islamic terrorism in Europe
9 Jan	Hostage crisis	4 (+1)	9	Porte de Vincennes, France	Porte de Vincennes hostage crisis	A man attacked a kosher market, taking hostages in a four-hour siege. The police raided the market, killing the gunman and freeing the hostages.	Amedy Coulibaly	Islamic terrorism in Europe
13 Jan	Artillery	12	18	Volnovakha, Ukraine	Volnovakha bus attack	MRLS attack on a highway checkpoint near the village of Buhas outside Volnovakha municipality in Donetsk Oblast that hit an intercity bus. These territories were controlled by Donetsk People's Republic.	Donetsk People's Republic	War in Donbas
21 Jan	Melee attack	0	12	Tel Aviv, Israel	2015 Tel Aviv attacks	A Palestinian from the West Bank, illegally entered Israel and boarded a crowded bus during rush hour and stabbed passengers before being shot in the leg and arrested by police.	Hamza Mohammed Hasan Matrouk (lone wolf)	Israeli–Palestinian conflict
24 Jan	Artillery	30	108	Mariupol, Ukraine	January 2015 Mariupol rocket attack	MRLS attack.	Donetsk People's Republic	War in Donbas
25 Jan	Attack	67+		Mamasapano, Philippines	Mamasapano clash	Special Action Force officers encountered fighters from the Bangsamoro Islamic Freedom Fighters, Moro Islamic Liberation Front and private armed groups after a successful operation to kill wanted militant Zulkifli Abdhir, also known as Marwan. 44 SAF officers, 18 MILF members, 5 BIFF members, and some civilians were killed	Bangsamoro Islamic Freedom Fighters; Moro Islamic Liberation Front	Moro conflict
4–5 Feb	Mass shooting	91+	500+	Fotokol, Cameroon	2015 Fotokol attack	Militants attacked villages and torched mosques and churches.	Boko Haram	Boko Haram insurgency in Cameroon
14–15 Feb	Shooting	2 (+1)	6	Copenhagen, Denmark	2015 Copenhagen shootings	A man opened fire at the "Art, blasphemy and the freedom of expression", which was organized by Lars Vilks at Krudttønden cafe at Østerbro. Later in the night on 15 February, Dan Uzan, a 38-year-old Jewish community member who was on security duty, was shot in the head by the same person and later died outside the Great Synagogue. The attacker was killed.	Omar Abdul Hamid El-Hussein	Islamic terrorism in Europe
22 Feb	Bombing	4	10–12	Kharkiv, Ukraine	2015 Kharkiv bombing	Explosion at a pro-Ukraine march. Three suspects were arrested on 26 February.	Anti-Maidan	Russo-Ukrainian War
7 Mar	Suicide bombing	58	139	Maiduguri, Nigeria	March 2015 Maiduguri suicide bombing	Suicide bombs roughly an hour after each other in markets and a car lot.	Boko Haram	Boko Haram insurgency
18 Mar	Shooting, hostage taking	21	40+	Tunis, Tunisia	Bardo National Museum attack	One or two gunmen attacked the Bardo Museum.	ISIL	Insurgency in the Maghreb (2002–present)
20 Mar	Suicide bombing	142	351	Sana'a, Yemen	2015 Sanaa mosque bombings	Militants carried out four suicide bombings at the Badr and al-Hashoosh Shia mosques during prayers.	ISIL-YP	Yemeni Civil War (2015–present)
26–27 Mar	Suicide bombing, Shooting	24	28	Mogadishu, Somalia	Makka al-Mukarama hotel attack	Six gunmen stormed an upscale hotel for diplomats and government officials. Combat between the militants and Somali troops ended two days later after twelve hours of fighting. Somalia's ambassador to Switzerland, Yusuf Bari-Bari, was among the dead.	Al-Shabaab	War in Somalia
2 Apr	Hostage taking, Shooting	147+ (+4)	79	Garissa, Kenya	Garissa University College attack	Six to ten gunmen opened fire at the Garissa University. Christians were their main target of the attack, with the Islamic extremists separating the Muslims from Christians before executing them.	Al-Shabaab	War in Somalia
18 Apr	Suicide bombing	33	115	Jalalabad, Afghanistan	April 2015 Jalalabad suicide bombing	A suicide bomber set off a bomb outside a state run bank.	ISIL	War in Afghanistan
27 Apr	Shooting	1 (+1)	2	Zvornik, Bosnia and Herzegovina	Zvornik police station terrorist attack	At a police station in Republika Srpska, an armed member of a wahhabist movement opened fire on the police. An officer was killed, two others were injured, and the attacker was killed by police.	Wahhabist movement	Islamic terrorism in Europe
3 May	Shooting	0 (+2)	1	Garland, Texas, United States	Garland terror attack	At Curtis Culwell Center, a school district owned events center, two assailants opened fire outside a Mohammed art exhibit. A policeman providing security for the event, returned fire, killing both suspects. One security guard was injured.	ISIL	
13 May	Attack	45	13	Karachi, Pakistan	2015 Karachi bus shooting	A bus carrying Shia Muslims was attacked by six armed gunmen who rode up in motorcycles.	Jundallah (claimed), ISIL (claimed), Tehrik-i-Taliban Pakistan (claimed)	Sectarianism in Pakistan
14 May	Suicide bombing, hostage taking	14	6	Kabul, Afghanistan	Park Palace guesthouse attack	A hotel that was hosting a cultural event was attacked.	Taliban	War in Afghanistan
22 May	Suicide bombing	22	102	Qatif, Saudi Arabia	2015 Qatif bombings	A suicide bomber detonated himself inside a Shia mosque during Friday prayers.	ISIS	
25 May	Shooting	7 (+1)	9	Tunis, Tunisia	Tunis barracks shooting	A soldier killed 8 comrades and injured 9 others in a shooting rampage before killing himself.	Unknown	
29 May	Attack	21	0	Mastung, Pakistan	2015 Mastung bus attack	Unknown militants attacked and burned two Karachi-bound buses.	Unknown	Baluchistan conflict
4 Jun	Ambush	20	11	Manipur, India	2015 Manipur ambush	The attack, in the Chandel district close to the border with Myanmar, was carried out against a small convoy of army vehicles traveling from one army camp to another in the hilly and forested area about 60 miles south of the state capital, Imphal.	Unknown	Insurgency in Northeast India
17 Jun	Shooting	9	1	Charleston, South Carolina, United States	Charleston church shooting	Mass shooting and hate crime at the Emanuel African Methodist Episcopal Church.	Dylann Roof	Terrorism in the United States
17 Jun	Bombing	63		Monguno, Nigeria	Monguno bombing	A large sack containing homemade bombs exploded.	Boko Haram	Boko Haram insurgency
22 Jun	Car bomb, Shooting	9	40	Kabul, Afghanistan	Kabul Parliament attack	Car bomb outside the National Assembly as fighters attempted to storm the building during a parliamentary speech of defense minister Mohammed Masoom Stanekzai.	Taliban	War in Afghanistan
25–29 Jun	Massacre, Suicide bombing, Hostage-taking	223–233	300+	Barkh Butan, Kobani, Syria	Kobanî massacre	Bombers detonated three car bombs in Kobanî, close to the Turkish border crossing.	ISIL	Syrian Civil War
26 Jun	Bombing, Beheading	1	2	Saint-Quentin-Fallavier, France	Saint-Quentin-Fallavier attack	One attacker decapitated one person and blew up a gas canister in a factory near Lyon. One person was killed and two were injured. The attacker wrote unknown Arabic writings on the severed head of the victim and placed it near the entrance of the factory. One attacker was killed and the other arrested.	ISIL	Islamic terrorism in Europe
26 Jun	Suicide bombing	27 (+1)	227	Kuwait City, Kuwait	2015 Kuwait mosque bombing	Suicide bombing at the Imam Sadiq mosque.	ISIL	
Jun 26	Mass shooting	38 (+1)	40	Sousse, Tunisia	Sousse attacks	Tourists killed by armed gunmen. The main gunman was killed in an exchange of gunfire with the army and armed police.	ISIL	ISIL insurgency in Tunisia
Jun 26	Attack	70	27	Leego, Somalia	Battle of Leego (2015)	Militants attacked an African Union base.	Al Shabaab	Somali Civil War
Jun 29	Shooting	1	3	Shilo, West Bank	2015 Shvut Rachel shooting	Four Israelis were shot and injured in a drive-by shooting. One of them died in hospital the following day.	PFLP	Israeli–Palestinian conflict
29 Jun	Car bomb	1	4	Cairo, Egypt	Assassination of Hisham Barakat	State prosecutor Hisham Barakat was killed by a remotely detonated car bomb. Two civilians and two police officers were injured.	Unknown	
1 Jul	Attack	21	9	North Sinai, Egypt	July 2015 Sinai clashes	Militants simultaneously attacked 21 security positions in an attempt to establish territorial control. Militants detonated two suicide car bombs in Sheikh Zuweid targeting two military barriers and then besieged a police station in Sheikh Zuweid and clashed with government forces in Sheikh Zuweid and Rafah. Militants also attacked and shelled minor security positions across North Sinai and said it detonated a suicide car bomb in Arish but no media or official reports confirmed that. The attacks left 21 Egpytians dead and 9 wounded.	Wilayat Sayna (Islamic State)	Sinai Insurgency
1–2 Jul	Massacre	145	17	Kukawa, Nigeria	July 2015 Kukawa massacre	Insurgents attacked mosques. 84 men and boys were killed on the 1st at one mosque. 17 others were wounded in the attack. 97 others, mostly men, were killed in mosques on the 2nd and a number of women and young girls were killed in their homes.	Boko Haram	Boko Haram insurgency
5 Jul	Bombings and arson	69	67+	Jos, Potiskum and Borno, Nigeria	5 July 2015 Nigeria attacks	In Potiskum, Yobe State, six people were killed in a suicide bombing at a church, followed by a bomb at a restaurant and a suicide bomb at a mosque in Jos, Plateau State. 51 were killed along with 67 injured. Militants killed nine people and burned 32 churches and 300 houses in cities in Borno State.	Boko Haram	Boko Haram insurgency
16 Jul	Spree shooting	5 (+1)	2	Chattanooga, United States	2015 Chattanooga shootings	A Kuwaiti-born national opened fire on a U.S. military recruitment center and a U.S. Navy Reserve center, killing 4 U.S. Marines and a sailor, and wounding a Marine and a Chattanooga police officer. An investigation revealed he had been radicalized online by a foreign Islamic terror group.	Muhammad Abdulazeez (lone wolf)	
17 Jul	Suicide bombing, car bomb	130	130	Khan Bani Saad, Iraq	2015 Khan Bani Saad bombing	A car bomb was sent to a crowded market during the Eid al-Fitr celebrations. The explosion brought down several buildings.	Islamic State	War in Iraq (2013–2017)
20 Jul	Suicide bombing	34	104	Suruç, Turkey	2015 Suruç bombing	A suicide bomber attacked a Peoples' Democratic Party protest in Şanlıurfa Province.	Islamic State	Turkey–ISIL conflict
26 Jul	Suicide bombing	10–15	unknown	Mogadishu, Somalia	Jazeera Palace Hotel bombing	A suicide bomber detonated a vehicle loaded with explosives at a hotel.	Al-Shabaab	Somali Civil War
27 Jul	Mass shooting	10	16	Punjab, India	2015 Gurdaspur attack	Gunmen dressed in Indian Army uniforms opened fire on a civilian bus and then took over a police station.	Unknown	
31 Jul	Arson	3	1	Duma, West Bank	Duma arson attack	Two masked men arrived at two houses and threw two Molotov cocktails into the houses. One of the houses was empty; in the other, the Daobasa family slept and the explosive burned the house, killing 18-month-old Ali Saad and severely wounding his parents and his 4-year-old brother. The parents succumbed to their wounds in the ensuing weeks.	Jewish gang	Israeli–Palestinian conflict
6 Aug	Suicide bombing	15	9	Abha, Saudi Arabia	2015 Abha mosque bombing	A suicide bomb attack at a mosque.	Islamic State affiliate	
7 Aug	Suicide bombing, car bomb	50+ (+1)	500+	Kabul, Afghanistan	7 August 2015 Kabul attacks	A suicide bomber attacked recruits outside a police academy while a truck bomb was set off in a residential area, leveling a block and leaving a thirty foot deep crater.	Taliban (suspected)	War in Afghanistan
10 Aug	Suicide bombing	5	16	Kabul, Afghanistan	10 August 2015 Kabul suicide attack		Taliban (suspected)	War in Afghanistan
13 Aug	car bomb	76+	212	Baghdad, Iraq	2015 Baghdad market truck bombing	A refrigeration truck loaded with explosives was blown up in the center of a market in Sadr City. Followers of Shia Islam were targeted.	Islamic State	Iraq War
16 Aug	Suicide bombing	22	20	Attock District, Pakistan	2015 Attock bombing	Two suspected suicide bombers detonated explosives in the home of Punjab Interior Minister Shuja Khanzada in the village of Shadikhan, killing the minister and at least 21 other people.	Lashkar-e-Jhangvi	War in North-West Pakistan
17 Aug	Bombing	21	123	Ratchaprasong Intersection, Bangkok	2015 Ratchaprasong bombing	Bomb attack outside the Erawan Shrine at the Ratchaprasong Intersection in Pathum Wan District.	Grey Wolves (suspected)	
21 Aug	Shooting Melee attack	0	3 (+1)	Oignies, Pas-de-Calais	2015 Thalys train attack	A man opened fire with an AKM assault rifle on a Thalys high speed train between Amsterdam and Paris. One person was shot in the neck. Two United States military personnel and their civilian friend intervened and stopped the attack continuing. One of them was cut in the struggle. Another passenger received glass cuts.	Ayoub El Kahzani	Islamic terrorism in Europe
22 Aug	Car bomb	10+	60+	Kabul, Afghanistan	22 August 2015 Kabul suicide attack		Taliban (suspected)	War in Afghanistan
20 Sep	Bombing, Suicide Bombing	145	97-150+	Maiduguri, Nigeria	September 2015 Maiduguri bombing	Series of blasts, some of which were suicide bombings, targeting a market and civilians in a mosque during night prayers and a football match.	Boko Haram	Boko Haram insurgency
20 Sep	Melee attack	50	50	Aksu, Xinjiang, China	2015 Aksu colliery attack	Attackers stormed a colliery before stealing firearms from police.	Uyghur separatists	Xinjiang conflict
1 Oct	Shooting	2	0	West Bank	Murder of Eitam and Na'ama Henkin	Five members of a Hamas terrorist cell killed Eitam and Naama Henkin, parents of a Jewish family driving home from a meeting of yeshiva graduates, on a road near Nablus. Their four children, who were sitting in the car's back seat, were unhurt. The attackers were caught on 5 October .	Hamas affiliated cell	Israeli–Palestinian conflict
2 Oct	Shooting	1 (+1)	0	Parramatta, Sydney, Australia	2015 Parramatta shooting	A 15-year-old shot dead an unarmed civilian police employee outside the NSW Police headquarters on Charles Street. The shooter was fatally shot by responding special constables after firing on them.	Farhad Khalil Mohammad Jabar (lone wolf)	Terrorism in Australia
3 Oct	Melee attack, shooting	2 (+1)	2	East Jerusalem	Lions' Gate stabbing	A 19 year old stabbed four people. He then took a firearm from one of the wounded and started shooting at civilians and police officers who shot back and killed him. Two men died from stab wounds, a woman and her two-year-old toddler were wounded. The incident occurred in the Old City of Jerusalem.	Mohannad Hallabi (lone wolf)	Israeli–Palestinian conflict
10 Oct	Suicide bombing	102	508	Ankara, Turkey	2015 Ankara bombings	Two suicide bombers blew themselves up near Ankara Central Station where a peace rally supported by the HDP was taking place. The attack left 102 dead and 508 injured.	Islamic State	Turkey–ISIL conflict
18 Oct	Shooting	2 (+1)	11	Be'er Sheva, Israel	Beersheva bus station shooting	An Israeli Bedouin shot and killed a soldier with a firearm in the main bus station. He then picked the soldier's rifle and clashed with other armed guards and soldiers. Police accidentally shot an Eritrean man who was presumed to be a second attacker, possibly because of his skin-color. Locals beat him and he later died.	Muhand al-Okabi (lone wolf)	Israeli–Palestinian conflict
19 Oct	Bus bombing	11	22	Quetta, Pakistan	2015 Quetta bus bombing	A bomb exploded in a bus.	Unknown	Balochistan conflict
22 Oct	Mass stabbing	3 (+1)	1	Trollhättan, Sweden	Trollhättan school stabbing	A 21-year-old attacked Kronan School with a sword. He targeted people with dark skin, stabbed four people, killing three before committing suicide by cop. The second teacher who was wounded died in hospital six weeks after the attack, on 3 December.	Anton Lundin Pettersson	Terrorism in Sweden
31 Oct	Bombing	224	0	Sinai, Egypt	Metrojet Flight 9268	The aircraft was bombed.	Islamic State	Sinai insurgency
4 Nov	Stabbing	0(+1)	4	California, United States	University of California, Merced stabbing attack	A man armed with a hunting knife, stabbed four people at the University of California before being shot and killed by police.	Faisal Mohammad (lone wolf)	Terrorism in the United States
12 Nov	Suicide bombing	89	200+	Beirut, Lebanon	2015 Beirut bombings	A suicide bomber detonated a bike loaded with explosives and when onlookers gathered, another suicide bomber detonated himself on them.	Islamic State	Syrian Civil War spillover in Lebanon
13 Nov	Attack	130 (+7)	368	Paris, France	November 2015 Paris attacks	A series of coordinated attacks began over about 35 minutes at six locations. The first shooting attack occurred in a restaurant and a bar in the 10th arrondissement. There was shooting and a bomb detonated at Bataclan theatre in the 11th arrondissement during a rock concert. Approximately 100 hostages were then taken and 90 were killed there. Other bombings took place outside the Stade de France stadium in the suburb of Saint-Denis during a football match between France and Germany.	Islamic State	Islamic terrorism in Europe
19 Nov	Melee attack	2	1	Tel Aviv, Israel	2015 Tel Aviv synagogue stabbing	A 36-year-old Palestinian man attacked a makeshift synagogue before being arrested.	lone wolf	Israeli–Palestinian conflict
19 Nov	Shooting	3	5	Gush Etzion Junction, West Bank	2015 Gush Etzion Junction attack	A Palestinian man opened fire on a line of traffic. The attacker then fled the scene, only to shoot at and intentionally ram into a group of pedestrians at a nearby junction.	lone wolf	Israeli–Palestinian conflict
20 Nov	Hostage taking, Shooting	20 (+2)	7	Bamako, Mali	2015 Bamako hotel attack	Gunmen took several hostages at the Radisson Hotel—among them 140 visitors and 30 employees.	Al-Mourabitoun; AQIM	Northern Mali conflict
24 Nov	Suicide bombing, car bombing, shooting	7	12	al-Arish, Egypt	2015 Arish attack	A day after the second round of parliamentary elections, militants attacked a hotel housing election judges.	Islamic State	Sinai Insurgency
27 Nov	Shooting Hostage-taking	3	9	Colorado Springs, Colorado, United States	Colorado Springs Planned Parenthood shooting	A shooting and five-hour standoff with police occurred at a Planned Parenthood clinic. A police officer and two civilians were killed. Five officers and four civilians were injured. The shooter was captured after police convinced him to surrender. His motives appeared to be political (specifically anti-abortion) in nature.	Robert Lewis Dear (lone wolf)	
2 Dec	Mass shooting	14 (+2)	23	San Bernardino, California, United States	2015 San Bernardino attack	Syed Rizwan Farook and Tashfeen Malik, a married couple, opened fire at a county health department's holiday banquet and left a failed pipe bomb at the scene. Both perpetrators were shot and killed four hours later in a shootout with police forces. Malik pledged allegiance to Islamic State of Iraq and the Levant on the day of the shooting, and the FBI investigated the attack as an act of terrorism.	Islamic State	Jihadist extremism in the United States
5 Dec	Melee attack	0	3	London, United Kingdom	December 2015 London Underground attack	A man with a knife stabbed three people at the Leytonstone tube station, reportedly screaming 'this is for Syria', before police used a stun gun on him and arrested him.	Muhyadin Mire (lone wolf)	Islamic terrorism in Europe
8 Dec	Suicide bombing, hostage taking, shooting	50	35	Kandahar, Afghanistan	2015 Kandahar Airport attack	Several suicide bombers penetrated the security of Kandahar Airfield, barricading themselves into an old school building that now contains shops and battled with soldiers for a few hours.	Taliban	War in Afghanistan
11 Dec	Car bombing, raid	6 (+2)	7	Kabul, Afghanistan	2015 Spanish Embassy attack in Kabul	Militants detonated a car bomb and stormed a guesthouse near the Spanish embassy in Shirpour neighborhood. Two guards were killed, one of them was Spanish and seven others were wounded. Two militants were shot dead by Afghan security forces.	Taliban	War in Afghanistan
11 Dec	Car bombing	60	80	Tell Tamer, Syria	Tell Tamer bombings	Three truck bombs struck near a Kurdish militia field hospital and in the crowded Souk Al Jumla market square, where the majority of the fatalities occurred.	Islamic State	Syrian Civil War
25 Dec	Suicide-bombing	0 (+1)	3–12	Rajshahi, Bangladesh	2015 Rajshahi mosque bombing	A suicide bomber detonated inside an Ahmadiyya mosque.	TBD	Internal conflict in Bangladesh
29 Dec	Suicide-bombing	26	50+	Mardan, Pakistan	Mardan suicide bombing	A suicide bomber detonated at the entrance of the National Database and Registration Authority.	Jamaat-ul-Ahrar	
30 Dec	Suicide bombing	16+	35+	Kamishli, Syria	2015 al-Qamishli bombings	Three suicide bombers blew themselves up in restaurants in the Kurdish controlled town, targeting the Kurdish and Assyrian Christian populations.	Islamic State	Syrian Civil War

Total incidents: 80

Terrorist incidents by country in 2015
Country	Number of incidents	Deaths	Injuries
Iraq	2,743	8,831	13,322
Afghanistan	1,926	6,208	6,958
Pakistan	1,235	1,606	1,847
India	882	387	647
Philippines	717	444	752
Yemen	668	2,373	3,065
Ukraine	637	765	1,401
Nigeria	637	5,351	2,854
Egypt	582	790	1,000
Libya	542	689	840
Syria	485	3,916	2,978
Bangladesh	465	76	695
Turkey	416	490	1,100
Somalia	407	1,389	799
Thailand	277	116	462
West Bank and Gaza Strip	247	117	239
Sudan	158	210	329
Democratic Republic of the Congo	141	367	244
Colombia	135	104	137
Mali	120	268	250
United Kingdom	115	1	23
Saudi Arabia	103	213	281
Burundi	97	220	218
Cameroon	82	928	461
Kenya	68	276	205
Israel	58	20	118
South Sudan	54	218	137
Germany	50	6	51
Central African Republic	48	172	91
Nepal	47	0	11
Lebanon	44	111	347
Niger	41	666	116
United States	38	44	52
France	36	161	159
Sweden	36	4	4
Myanmar	33	58	151
Greece	31	1	2
Ireland	29	0	0
Indonesia	28	19	17
Chad	27	306	427
Russia	21	21	24
Mexico	19	9	10
Paraguay	19	13	0
Bahrain	18	5	22
Tunisia	17	103	121
Algeria	16	21	19
China	16	123	83
Tanzania	14	10	14
Sri Lanka	11	3	14
Japan	10	0	0
Peru	10	6	7
Uganda	10	4	1
Iran	9	38	11
Finland	9	0	1
Mozambique	7	12	3
Australia	7	2	0
Ethiopia	7	48	43
Bosnia and Herzegovina	6	4	6
Italy	5	0	1
Canada	5	0	2
Brazil	5	3	0
Malaysia	5	1	1
Burkina Faso	5	6	9
Macedonia	4	0	2
Albania	4	0	0
Ivory Coast	4	14	10
Denmark	4	2	5
Czech Republic	4	0	0
Jordan	4	7	11
Tajikistan	3	12	10
Cyprus	3	0	0
Venezuela	3	1	0
Kosovo	2	0	0
Netherlands	2	0	0
Laos	2	0	0
Senegal	2	0	4
Maldives	2	0	3
Estonia	2	0	0
Kyrgyzstan	2	1	0
Guinea	2	1	4
South Africa	2	2	32
Armenia	2	0	1
Bulgaria	2	0	0
Malta	1	0	0
Ecuador	1	0	0
Kuwait	1	28	227
Lesotho	1	1	2
Georgia	1	0	0
Hungary	1	0	0
Djibouti	1	0	0
Trinidad and Tobago	1	0	0
Morocco	1	0	0
Chile	1	0	0
Argentina	1	0	0
South Korea	1	0	1
Montenegro	1	0	0
Uzbekistan	1	0	0
Qatar	1	0	1
Total	14,806	38,422	43,495
