= Sawabir =

Sawaber الصوابر Sawabir, Sawaabir, Al-Sawaber
- City
- Location within Kuwait
- Province: Capital Governorate
- Area: Sharq
- Block: 6

Sawabir (Arabic: الصوابر, romanized: aṣ-Ṣawābir Gulf Arabic pronunciation [/isˤ.sˤə.waː.bˤɪr/]) is in an old district in Sharq area in Kuwait City, the capital of Kuwait. It encompasses the sixth block of Sharq. It used to house a huge plot of subsidized apartment complexes and the Ministry of Information headquarters, thus giving birth to many famous media personalities. The Sawabir apartments were demolished in 2019 and as a result, the district is mostly empty except for shops, mosques, towers, administrative buildings, and few other amenities along its edges.

== History ==
Ṣawābir (صوابر), also known as Freej Al-Sawabir, is named after a family of Al-Awazim tribe, who used to live there. Kuwait's first MP and first Minister, Maʿṣūma li-Mbārak, graduated from Sawabir's school. Several prominent Kuwaiti writers, actors, and artists were also born there. The district used to house the headquarters of Kuwait's Ministry of Information as well.

=== Iraqi Invasion of 1990–1991 ===
When Saddam Hussein ordered the invasion of Kuwait on 2 August 1990, Kuwaiti Resistance cells were formed immediately afterwards. Owing to the numerous artists and media personnel who lived there, the district played a key role in resisting the occupation using the media. Some of Sawabir residents were active in sending footage of Iraqi actions abroad. Ḥabīb Al-Zaqqāḥ, a Sawabir resident, was caught and executed due to this. Another underground broadcaster was Tawfīq il-Amīr, Kuwait TV's second cameraman and the cinematographer of Kuwait's most-famous film, Bas Ya Bahar. He established from his home in Ṣubāḥ is-Sālim the Here is Kuwait (Arabic: هنا الكويت, romanized: Huna l-Kuwayt) radio station with his colleagues at the Ministry of Information. This station was able to secretly broadcast news of Kuwait to the outside world. He died in September 2021.

=== 2015 Bombing ===
The city is home to the Imam Ja'far as-Sadiq Mosque, one of the country's oldest Shiite mosque's, which was the target of a terrorist attack in 2015, the deadliest terror attack in the country.

== Sawabir residential apartment complexes ==
The Sawabir apartment complexes used to be a prominent symbol of Kuwait City. The 22,800-square-metre (245,000 sq ft) government-built complexes, which featured parks, parking, and other amenities had 528 apartments with unique architectural design and used to house mainly people of Al-Ahsa (Hasawi) origin and people of the Al-Azmi tribe (pl. Awazim). This has led to the creation of some of Kuwait's oldest Shi'ite landmarks and places of interest in Kuwait City, including the Imam Jafar Al-Sadiq Mosque [wd] and the Jaʿfari Hussainiya, established in 1912. A few metres away, a Sunni mosque built in 1898 is kept as a historic site.

=== Fires ===
On 19 November 1967, a major fire broke out in a kerosene storage plot belonging to Ḥasan Ibrāhīm, known locally as Ḥasan Gaz. It was the biggest fire in Kuwait's history up to that point, with some people calling it "the Hiroshima of Kuwait".

There was a fire that ignited in complex #10 in August 2005. Another fire that consumed three floors ignited in 2010, leading to eighteen injuries and no deaths. Five fire stations and more than a hundred firefighters participated in the operations. Kuwait's Minister of Housing Ahmad Al-Fahad announced compensation for owners of the damaged apartments with 3,000KWD each. Kuwaiti MPs criticized the government, with MP Ḥussain il-Ḥrēti calling on the government to appraise and find alternative dwelling for its residents.

In 2012, another fire that resulted in one death and ten injuries (five of whom were firefighters), with firefighters stating the poor administration of the building made their work more difficult This has led to increased scrutiny and criticism over the government's lack of supervision and lax enforcement of regulations by residents.

The government appraised the apartments at 110 million KWD in 2017 and completed the demolitions in 2019. Around 34 apartments in the newly-built sea-side area of Northwest Sulaibikhata [wd] were given to Sawabir residents.
