= The Kingdom (2007 film) =

2007 film by Peter Berg

- Theatrical release poster
- Directed by: Peter Berg
- Written by: Matthew Michael Carnahan
- Produced by: Michael Mann; Scott Stuber
- Starring: Jamie Foxx; Chris Cooper; Jennifer Garner; Jason Bateman; Jeremy Piven; Danny Huston; Richard Jenkins
- Cinematography: Mauro Fiore
- Edited by: Colby Parker Jr.; Kevin Stitt
- Music by: Danny Elfman
- Production companies: Relativity Media; Forward Pass; Stuber/Parent
- Distributed by: Universal Pictures
- Release dates: August 22, 2007 (EIFF); September 28, 2007 (United States); October 11, 2007 (Germany)
- Running time: 110 minutes
- Countries: United States; Germany
- Language: English
- Budget: $70–72.5 million
- Box office: $86.8 million

The Kingdom is a 2007 action thriller film directed by Peter Berg and starring Jamie Foxx, Chris Cooper, and Jennifer Garner. The film is set in Saudi Arabia, and centers on FBI Special Agent Fleury and his team to search for the ones responsible for the attack on an oil company housing compound. The plot is based on the 1996 Khobar Towers housing complex bombing, the 2004 Khobar massacre, and the 2003 Riyadh compound bombings.

First premiered at the Edinburgh International Film Festival, it was theatrically released in the United States by Universal Pictures on September 28, 2007. The film triggered controversy in some Middle Eastern nations, received mixed critical reviews and had a disappointing box office performance.

== Plot ==
Al-Qaeda terrorists in Riyadh, Saudi Arabia, detonate an explosive at an American oil company housing compound, killing both American and Saudi citizens. Before this, terrorists disguised as Saudi State Police had shot the inhabitants in the compound before they were stopped by Sergeant Haytham of the Saudi State Police; after this, another terrorist commits a suicide bombing. Francis Manner, the Federal Bureau of Investigation's Legal Attaché in Saudi Arabia, alerts his colleague, Special Agent Ronald Fleury, to the attacks before being killed by a second bomb later that night.

At FBI Headquarters in Washington, D.C., Fleury briefs his rapid deployment team on the attack, believing it to have been orchestrated by local Saudi terrorist Abu Hamza. He recruits forensic examiner Janet Mayes, intelligence analyst Adam Leavitt, and bomb technician Grant Sykes to his team. Although the U.S. Justice Department and the U.S. State Department hinder FBI efforts to investigate, Fleury blackmails the Saudi ambassador into allowing his team into Riyadh.

On arrival, the team is met by Colonel Faris al-Ghazi, the commander of the Saudi State Police Force providing security at the compound, and General Al Abdulmalik of the Saudi Arabian National Guard. The general's inexperience in criminal investigation hinders Fleury's team.

The team is invited to the palace of Saudi Prince Ahmed bin Khaled, where Fleury convinces the Prince that Colonel al-Ghazi is a better fit to lead the investigation. With this change in leadership, the Americans are allowed direct access to the crime scene. This allows Fleury to sympathize with and befriend al-Ghazi.

While searching for evidence, Sergeant Haytham and Sykes discover the second bomb was detonated in an ambulance and that the brother of one of the dead terrorists had access to ambulances and police uniforms. Al-Ghazi orders a raid by the Saudi Emergency Force on a terrorist stronghold, killing several of them.

Afterward, Fleury's team discovers clues, including photos of the U.S. and other Western embassies in Riyadh. The U.S. Embassy Deputy Chief of Mission Damon Schmidt notifies Fleury and his team that they have been ordered to return to the United States. However, the team's convoy is attacked and Leavitt is kidnapped. Al-Ghazi commandeers a civilian vehicle, and the team chases the car holding Leavitt into the dangerous Al-Suwaidi neighborhood.

As they pull up, a gunman fires rocket-propelled grenades at them and a fierce firefight starts. Leavitt is carried into a room inside a complex, where the terrorists prepare to film his execution before Mayes, separated from al-Ghazi and Fleury, saves him just in time.

As al-Ghazi and the team start to leave, Fleury notices a trail of blood leading to the back of the apartment, where a family lives. After noticing several clues, al-Ghazi realizes the grandfather is Abu Hamza. Abu Hamza's teenage grandson walks out of the bedroom and shoots al-Ghazi in the neck, then points his gun at Mayes, prompting Fleury to kill him and Haytham to kill Abu Hamza. Al-Ghazi bleeds out in Fleury's arms, while Abu Hamza whispers something to his other grandchild.

At Al-Ghazi's house, Fleury and Haytham meet and comfort his family. Fleury and his team return to the US, where they are commended by the FBI Director for their work. Leavitt asks Fleury what he whispered to Mayes, earlier in the film, to get her to stop crying over Manner. Simultaneously, both Fleury and Hamza's grandson responds "We are gonna kill 'em all."

== Cast ==
- Jamie Foxx as Special Agent Ronald Fleury
- Chris Cooper as Special Agent Grant Sykes
- Jennifer Garner as Special Agent Janet Mayes
- Jason Bateman as Special Agent Adam Leavitt
- Ashraf Barhom as Colonel Faris Al-Ghazi
- Ali Suliman as Sergeant Haytham
- Jeremy Piven as Damon Schmidt
- Richard Jenkins as FBI Director Robert Grace
- Tim McGraw as Aaron Jackson
- Kyle Chandler as Special Agent Francis Manner
- Frances Fisher as Elaine Flowers
- Danny Huston as US Attorney General Gideon Young
- Kelly AuCoin as Ellis Leach
- Anna Deavere Smith as Maricella Canavesio
- Minka Kelly as Miss Ross
- Amy Hunter as Lyla Fleury
- T.J. Burnett as Kevin Fleury
- Omar Berdouni as Saudi Prince Ahmed Bin Khaled.
- Raad Rawi as Prince Thamer
- Mahmoud Said as Brigadier General Al Abdulmalik
- Tom Bresnahan as DSS Agent Rex Burr
- Trevor St. John as Earl Ripon
- Ashley Scott as Janine Ripon
- Uri Gavriel as Izz Al-Din

== Production ==
Prior to filming, director Peter Berg spent two weeks in Saudi Arabia researching the film. Filming began on July 10, 2006, on the west side of the old Maricopa County Courthouse in Phoenix, Arizona. Additional scenes were being filmed concurrently in Mesa, Arizona; the scenes at the American compound were shot at the Polytechnic campus of Arizona State University which from 1941 until its closure in 1993 was the previous location of Williams Air Force Base (USAF). In some of the trailer frames, saguaro cacti not native to Saudi Arabia are visible in the background. The scenes in the men's locker room at the beginning of the film were filmed in the men's locker room and detention area of the Gilbert Police Department. The FBI briefing scene was filmed in the media amphitheater/classroom in the same police building. The high-speed driving scenes were filmed on Loop 202, which runs through Mesa and Gilbert, just prior to its opening for public use only a few miles from the ASU campus.

While shooting on location in Mesa, Berg was involved in a fatal accident that resulted in the death of another crew member. The SUV he was riding in collided with a John Deere Gator all-terrain vehicle driven by assistant property master Nick Papac. Papac died three hours later. On August 8, 2008, Papac's parents Michael Papac and Michele Bell filed a lawsuit against the director, a driver, and the production company. The lawsuit was dropped in 2008. Filming resumed one day after the incident.

On-location filming took place in Abu Dhabi, United Arab Emirates for two weeks in mid-September. Since Universal Pictures does not have an office in the Middle East, the production was facilitated by a local production firm called Filmworks, based in Dubai. Filming also took place at the Emirates Palace hotel in Abu Dhabi.

The film's production cost an estimated $70–72.5 million.

== Release ==
The film was first released at the Edinburgh International Film Festival on August 22, 2007. In the United States, it was released on September 28, 2007, and on October 11, 2007, in Germany. It was also released in the United Arab Emirates and Qatar.

The film was banned in Kuwait and Bahrain. According to Agence France-Presse, a source from the Kuwaiti information ministry said that “the screening of the film has been banned in Kuwait for many reasons, chiefly because it is a false depiction of facts.” An official from the Bahraini information ministry cited the film's purported non-conformity “with the censorship laws of the Kingdom of Bahrain” as one of the reasons for the ban. He further added that “the film vilifies a brotherly country, the Kingdom of Saudi Arabia.”

== Reception ==
=== Critical response ===
Review aggregator website Rotten Tomatoes reports an approval rating of 51% based on 186 reviews, with an average rating of 5.8/10. The site's critical consensus reads, "While providing several top-notch action scenes, The Kingdom ultimately collapses under the weight of formula and muddled politics." At Metacritic, which assigns a normalized rating to reviews, the film has an average weighted score of 56 out of 100, based on 37 critics, indicating "mixed or average reviews". Audiences polled by CinemaScore gave the film an average grade of "B+" on an A+ to F scale.

Weekly Standard columnist John Podhoretz called the film "perfectly paced" and "remarkably crisp and satisfying", arguing that it evokes the films The Taking of Pelham One Two Three, Dog Day Afternoon, and The New Centurions. The New York Times critic A. O. Scott called it "a slick, brutishly effective genre movie". He also stated that "Just as Rambo offered the fantasy do-over of the aftermath of the Vietnam War, The Kingdom can be seen as a wishful revisionist scenario for the American response to Islamic fundamentalist terrorism." Peter Travers of Rolling Stone gave the film three stars out of four, remarking "Fleury goes John Wayne on their ass." Evan Williams of The Australian called it "an excellent thriller" and stated that it "may be the first Hollywood film to confront Saudi involvement in international terrorism."

The A.V. Club's Scott Tobias gave the movie a C, criticizing the movie's "queasy brand of escapism" by offering the audience the pleasure of "[w]inning imaginary wars" and giving an idealized portrayal of the efficiency of American intelligence. He says the film appeals to the audience's "basest instincts" and that, despite one sympathetic Arab character, the film could be tarred as racist. Lisa Schwarzbaum of Entertainment Weekly accused the film of "treating its audience like cash-dispensing machines". Kenneth Turan of The Los Angeles Times called it "a slick excuse for efficient mayhem that's not half as smart as it would like to be." He added that "the film's thematic similarity to those jingoistic World War II-era 'Yellow Peril' films makes it hard not to feel your humanity being diminished." Scholar Moustafa Bayoumi has critiqued the racialization of Arabs in the film (along with The Siege) and suggested it is representative of an emerging sub-genre he says is defined by "the notion of African-American leadership of the Arab world, intertwined with friendship with it."

=== Middle Eastern reception ===
Faisal Abbas, media editor of the London-based international Arabic journal Asharq Al Awsat, wrote on the newspaper's English website that "despite some aspects which might be perceived by some as negative, many might be pleasantly surprised after watching this film, bearing in mind that Arabs have for a long time been among Hollywood's favorite villains." Faisal concluded that "in all cases, the film is definitely action-packed, and perhaps Saudis and Arabs may enjoy it more than Americans, as events are depicted as taking place in the Saudi capital…and it is not every day that you watch a Hollywood-style car chase happening on the streets of Riyadh. For Westerners, the movie might be an interesting 'insight' to a culture that is very different to their own."

In a review titled "One good Arab" for The Guardian, Palestinian writer Sharif Nashashibi argues the film is one in a long tradition of Western works where Arabs are vilified and Americans are portrayed as heroes, only that this time it bothered to add "a token Arab 'good guy'", equating good with pro-American, "to make up for the fact that the rest of the Arab characters are bad." All other Arab characters in the movie, he says, "are portrayed negatively – from the brutal, hate-filled, anti-western, religiously fanatical terrorists, to the inept, corrupt, heavy-handed, secretive and frustratingly bureaucratic Saudi authorities", as opposed to the "humanity, grief, compassion, determination, ability and patriotism of most of the American characters". He concludes that "The Kingdom perpetuates negative stereotypes for a quick buck and an adrenaline rush, at a time in the world where breeding such ignorance and prejudice has proven catastrophic." He also took issue with what he perceived to be star Jamie Foxx's anti-Arab comments to Jon Stewart on The Daily Show, despite being "treated 'like royalty' in the United Arab Emirates" during the shooting.

=== Box office performance ===
The Kingdom grossed $47.5 million in the United States and $39 million in other territories for a worldwide gross of $86.6 million.

The film grossed $17.1 million in 2,733 theatres in the United States and Canada in its opening weekend, ranking #2 at the box office. It also grossed £919,537 in the United Kingdom, about $1.9 million.

== See also ==
- Insurgency in Saudi Arabia
- Counter-terrorism
- War on terror
