= Al Suwaidi Park =

Public park in Riyadh, Saudi Arabia

- حديقة السويدي
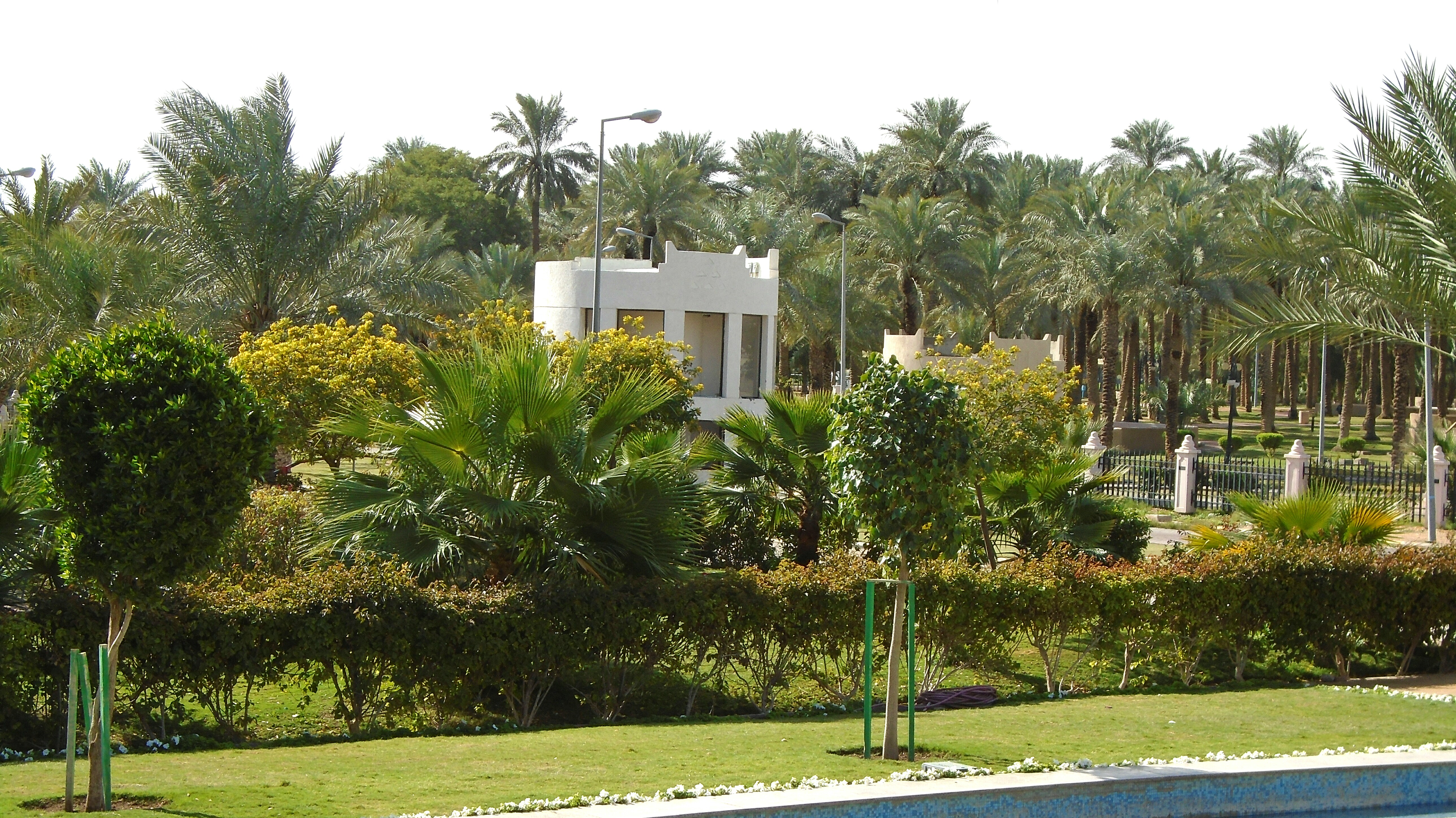
- Al Suwaidi Park, 2017
- Interactive map of Al Suwaidi Park
- Type: Urban park
- Location: Riyadh, Saudi Arabia
- Coordinates: 24°35′50″N 46°41′40″E
- Area: 10 hectares (25 acres)
- Opened: 1983

Al Suwaidi Park (Arabic: حديقة السويدي) is an urban park in the al-Suwaidi neighborhood of Riyadh, Saudi Arabia. Opened in 1983, it covers an area of almost 25 acres. The park has gained prominence since 2022, when it was first designated as a Riyadh Season zone that hosts culturally themed events from several Asian and African countries, including culinary traditions, music, folk dances and concerts.

== Overview and timeline ==
Al Suwaidi Park was established in 1983 by the Riyadh Municipality.

=== Riyadh Season 2022 ===
In 2022, Al Suwaidi Park was selected as one of the 15 zones of the Riyadh Season festival by the General Entertainment Authority that exhibited cultural and lifestyle themes from different countries, namely, India, Pakistan, Bangladesh, Sri Lanka, Sudan and the Philippines.

=== Riyadh Season 2023 ===
The General Entertainment Authority designated Al Suwaidi Park as one of the 12 zones of the 2023 edition of the Riyadh Season festival. In the first week of November 2023, the park hosted Indian culture-themed events. In the second week, the park hosted Filipino cultural events, followed by the Indonesian and Sudanese culture-themed exhibitions in the third and fourth weeks respectively.

In late November 2023, the Pakistani theme was conducted. The first week of December 2023 showed Bangladeshi culture. The second week of December 2023 hosted events related to the Nepali culture.

=== Riyadh Season 2024 ===
Al Suwaidi Park was selected as one of the zones for 2024 edition of Riyadh Season festival by the General Entertainment Authority. It showcased cultures from Pakistan, India, Philippines, Indonesia, Bangladesh, Yemen, Lebanon, Jordan, Sudan, Egypt and Syria.
