= Frank Gardner (journalist) =

English journalist and novelist (born 1961)

Frank Gardner OBE TD VR FRGS
- Born: Francis Rolleston Gardner; 31 July 1961 (age 65); Hampstead, London, England
- Education: Marlborough College; University of Exeter
- Occupation: Journalist
- Notable credit: BBC Six O'Clock News
- Spouse: Amanda Jane Pearson (m. 1997–2019)
- Children: 2
- Military career
- Allegiance: United Kingdom
- Branch: British Army
- Service years: 1984–2021
- Rank: Major
- Service number: 519796
- Units: Royal Green Jackets; Adjutant General's Corps
- Awards: Volunteer Reserves Service Medal (VRSM)

Francis Rolleston Gardner OBE TD VR FRGS (born 31 July 1961) is a British journalist, author and retired British Army Reserve officer. He is currently the BBC's Security Correspondent, and since the September 11 attacks on New York has specialised in covering stories related to the war on terror.

Gardner joined BBC World as a producer and reporter in 1995, and became the BBC's first full-time Gulf correspondent in 1997, before being appointed BBC Middle East correspondent in 1999. On 6 June 2004, while reporting from Al-Suwaidi, a district of Riyadh, Saudi Arabia, Gardner was seriously injured in an attack by al-Qaida gunmen, which left him partially paralysed in the legs. He returned to reporting for the BBC in mid-2005, using a wheelchair or a frame. He has written two non-fiction works as well as a series of novels featuring the fictional SBS officer-turned MI6 operative Luke Carlton.

== Early life ==
Gardner was born on 31 July 1961. His father and mother, Robert Neil Gardner (1922–2010) and Evelyn Grace Rolleston (1923–2014), were both diplomats, and when he was six he moved from the UK to the Hague in the Netherlands. In 1951, while second secretary at the British Embassy in Czechoslovakia, his father was expelled from the country for espionage activities after an incident in a prohibited military area where he was shot at. His grandfather was physician John Davy Rolleston. Educated at Saint Ronan's School, and Marlborough College, Gardner was pushed by his teachers into taking up biathlon, which enabled him to travel to Austria to train with the British Army biathlon team.

When he was 16, Gardner met the Arabian explorer Sir Wilfred Thesiger, and was invited to the explorer's home in Chelsea. Partly as a result – and partly reasoning that knowing the Arabic language would make him employable in that part of the world – he was determined to study Arabic. In his gap year Gardner saved up by working in a brick factory then went backpacking from Morocco to Istanbul. He then travelled to Manila in the Philippines, to go hiking in the mountains of Luzon. He returned to study at the University of Exeter, graduating in 1984 with a Bachelor of Arts (BA Hons) in Arabic and Islamic Studies.

== Career ==
=== Military service ===
Gardner was commissioned on 23 May 1984 as a second lieutenant (on probation). On 30 September 1984, he transferred from the general list to the 4th Volunteer Battalion, the Royal Green Jackets, as a second lieutenant (on probation) and was given seniority from 23 May 1984. His commission was confirmed and his rank of second lieutenant was dated to 23 May 1984 with seniority from 23 May 1982. He was promoted to lieutenant on 30 September 1985, with seniority from 23 May 1984. He was promoted to captain on 1 October 1990, with seniority from 1 February 1989.

On 11 November 1993, Gardner was appointed a captain in the Regular Army Reserve. He returned to the Territorial Army on 24 April 1997, serving in the Educational and Training Services Branch of the Adjutant General's Corps. He was promoted to major in the Territorial Army on 1 July 2006, and retired on 30 July 2021.

=== Marketing and Banking ===
Gardner worked as a marketing manager for Gulf Exports from 1984 to 1986. He then had a nine-year career as an investment banker: firstly in trading and sales for Saudi International Bank from 1986 to 1990 and then for Robert Fleming Bank from 1990 to 1995, becoming Director of Middle East.

=== Journalism ===
In 1995 he left banking and joined BBC World as a producer and reporter. He became the BBC's first full-time Gulf correspondent in 1997, setting up as a freelance stringer in Dubai. In 1999 Gardner was appointed BBC Middle East correspondent in charge of the bureau in Cairo, but travelled throughout the region. Following the September 11 attacks on New York, Gardner specialised in covering stories related to the war on terror.

On 6 June 2004, while reporting from Al-Suwaidi, a district of Riyadh, Saudi Arabia, notorious for extremism, Gardner was shot six times and seriously injured in an attack by al-Qaida gunmen. His colleague, Irish cameraman Simon Cumbers, was shot dead. Of the bullets which hit Gardner in his torso (others passed through his shoulder and leg) one hit his spinal nerves and he was left partially paralysed in the legs and since then has used a wheelchair. The pair had continued filming for more than half an hour, against the advice of Gardner's official Saudi Arabian government minders. The Saudi government promised compensation but they have never paid. After 14 surgical operations, seven months in hospital and several months of rehabilitation, he returned to reporting for the BBC in mid-2005, using a wheelchair or a frame. Despite his injury, he still frequently reports from the field including Afghanistan and Colombia but usually comments on top stories from a BBC studio. One of the gunmen who shot Gardner and Cumbers, Adel al-Dhubaiti, was captured and executed by Saudi authorities in January 2016.

In September 2012, Gardner revealed that Queen Elizabeth II had been upset some years earlier that Abu Hamza al-Masri could not be arrested. The BBC apologised later that day for the revelation.

=== Other media work ===
Gardner has presented a variety of documentaries for the BBC since 2011. In 2011, Gardner presented Tintin's Adventure with Frank Gardner for the BBC, a documentary in which he retraced Hergé's character Tintin's journey from Brussels to Berlin to Moscow on his first ever adventure – Tintin in the Land of the Soviets. In 2013 Gardner presented a one-hour BBC Two documentary entitled Frank Gardner's Return to Saudi Arabia, visiting the Yemeni border, Jeddah, Eastern Province and the Riyadh hospital where he recovered from his attack in 2004. In September 2015, Gardner was featured in an episode of the BBC's family history programme Who Do You Think You Are? in which he learned that he was directly descended from William the Conqueror.

In March 2012, Gardner pulled out of hosting the Counter-Terrorism and Specialist Security Awards (CTSS) amid concerns that this would compromise the BBC's impartiality. In June 2018, Gardner chaired the keynote stage across the first two days of the security industry event IFSEC International, taking place in the ExCeL exhibition centre in London.

In 2016, Gardner appeared on Channel 4's coverage of the Paralympic Games in Rio de Janeiro in his role as President of the GB Ski Club.

In 2016 Gardner teamed up with Benedict Allen in the BBC Two two-part documentary Birds of Paradise: The Ultimate Quest. During an expedition to Papua New Guinea, they sought the elusive birds-of-paradise (a life-long ambition of Gardner's as an experienced birdwatcher), including the King of Saxony. The programme was broadcast on 3 and 10 February 2017.

Being Frank: The Frank Gardner Story was broadcast by BBC Two on 5 November 2020. The documentary explores the challenges of being suddenly disabled.

On 24 September 2022, Gardner presented the BBC News special, Ukraine: Putin's Nuclear Threat. The documentary focuses on recent gains by Ukrainian forces in the Russo–Ukrainian War, and how it could provoke President Putin into the use of tactical nuclear weapons.

== Published works ==
Gardner's Sunday Times bestseller Blood and Sand (ISBN 978-0-553-81771-3), describing his 25 years of Middle Eastern experiences, was published by Transworld in 2006. His book Far Horizons (ISBN 978-0-593-05968-5), about unusual journeys to unusual places, was published in May 2009.

Gardner's bestselling first novel, Crisis, featuring the fictional SBS officer-turned MI6 operative Luke Carlton and a ruthless Colombian drug lord, was published in June 2016. His second novel, Ultimatum, was published in June 2018 followed by the third Luke Carlton novel, Outbreak in 2021 and the forth, Invasion in 2024.

== Honours and awards ==
In the 2005 Birthday Honours, Gardner was appointed an Officer of the Order of the British Empire (OBE) for services to journalism. As a Territorial Army officer, he was awarded the Efficiency Decoration (TD) for past years of service on 29 January 2008 and its replacement, the Volunteer Reserves Service Medal (VRSM), on 8 March 2011.

He has been awarded Honorary Doctorates of Law by the University of Nottingham, Staffordshire University, the University of Exeter, the University of East Anglia and the Open University. He has also received the McWhirter Award for Bravery, Spain's El Mundo Prize for International Journalism, the Zayed Medal for Journalism and been voted Person of the Year by the UK Press Gazette. He is a fellow of the Royal Geographical Society (FRGS).

== Personal life ==
Gardner married New Zealand–born Amanda Pearson in 1997. The couple had two daughters before divorcing in 2018. Gardner subsequently began a relationship with BBC weather presenter Elizabeth Rizzini.

Gardner is a keen birdwatcher and presented a September 2009 BBC Archive Hour programme on the ornithologist Sir Peter Scott.
