= Kuwait and state-sponsored terrorism =

Kuwait has been frequently accused of supporting terrorism financing within its borders. Kuwait has been described as the world's biggest source of terrorism funding, particularly for ISIS and Al-Qaeda.

== History ==
In 2014, David S. Cohen, then Under Secretary of the Treasury for Terrorism and Financial Intelligence, accused the Kuwaiti government of supporting terrorism. Since the early 1990s, accusations of Kuwait funding terrorism have been very common and come from a wide variety of sources including intelligence reports, government officials, scholarly research, and renowned journalists. Kuwait is listed as sources of militant money in Afghanistan and Pakistan. Kuwait is described as a "source of funds and a key transit point" for al-Qaeda and other militant groups.

On 26 June 2015, a suicide bombing took place at a Shia mosque in Kuwait City, consequently 27 people died. ISIS claimed responsibility for the attack. It was the largest terrorism attack in Kuwait's history. In the aftermath, a lawsuit was filed accusing the Kuwaiti government of negligence and direct responsibility for the terror attack.

The Kuwait-based Society of the Revival of Islamic Heritage (RIHS) appears on the United States State Department list of Foreign Terrorist Organizations. The branches in Pakistan and Afghanistan allegedly became corrupted by members of al-Qaeda; those two branches were embargoed on 9 January 2002 by the United States. The government of Russia has banned RIHS from operating anywhere in Russia and has deemed the society to be a terrorist organisation.

A release from the Treasury's Press Office alleged that the Pakistan office, under the direction of Abd al-Muhsin al-Libi, had inflated the number of orphans under its care. The United States has the organization listed on the OFAC SDN list (as Administration of the Revival of Islamic Heritage Society Committee), thus prohibiting U.S. citizens and permanent residents from doing business with the Kuwaiti organization.

According to the Spanish intelligence agency CNI, Kuwait provided funding and aid to Islamic associations and congregations in Spain through its subsidiary branch of RIHS. Kuwait this way funded mosques in Reus and Torredembarra who spread an ideology contrary to the integration of Muslims into Spanish society and fostering hatred of non-Muslims.

== See also ==
- 2015 Kuwait mosque bombing
- Terrorism in Kuwait
- Human rights in Kuwait
- List of charities accused of ties to terrorism
- State-sponsored terrorism
