= Al Urayja Sub-Municipality =

Baladiyah Al-Urayja بلدية العريجاء
- Baladiyah
- Interactive map of Baladiyah Al-Urayja
- Country: Saudi Arabia
- City: Riyadh
- Website: orayja.alriyadh.gov.sa

Baladiyah al-Urayja (Arabic: بلدية العريجاء), also Al Urayja Sub-Municipality is one of the 16 baladiyahs of Riyadh, Saudi Arabia. It includes 13 neighborhoods and districts and is responsible for their planning, development and maintenance.

== Neighborhoods and districts ==
- Derihmiyah
- Shubra
- Suwaydi al-Gharbi
- Al Urayja
- Al Urayja al-Gharbiyah (partially)
- Al Urayja al-Wusta
- Al-Zahrah
- Al-Zahrah al-Badiah
- Al-Suwaidi
- Al-Sultanah
- Tuwaiq
- Hajrah Laban (partially)
