= Fahd Al-Ahmed Charity =

Kuwaiti charitable organization that was shut down

The Fahd Al-Ahmed Charity (also known as the Sheikh Fahad Al-Ahmad Charity Organization) was a Kuwaiti charitable organization that was permanently shut down by the Kuwaiti government following the June 26, 2015 terrorist attack on the Imam Sadiq Mosque.

== History ==
The charity was founded on June 29, 2010 in honor of Sheikh Fahad Al-Ahmed Al-Jaber Al-Sabah, a Kuwaiti military officer killed during the Iraqi invasion of Kuwait in 1990.

== Notable work ==
The Fahd Al-Ahmed Charity took part in a number of fundraising campaigns designed to bring humanitarian assistance to Muslims around the world, including raising donations for Muslims in Burma and establishing a fund sponsoring orphans throughout the Muslim world.

The charity also hosted the yearly Fahd Al-Ahmed International Charity Awards for outstanding Islamic humanitarian work. Turkish Prime Minister Recep Tayyip Erdoğan received the award in 2011.

== Suspected terrorist links and shutdown ==
According to Kuwaiti newspaperAl Rai, since the beginning of the Syrian civil war the Fahd Al-Ahmed Charity had received multiple warnings from the Kuwaiti Ministry of Labor and Social Affairs for refusing to comply with government regulations requiring that all humanitarian funds for Syria be collected through official channels. These warnings were never heeded.

On 26 June 2015, a suicide bomber detonated an explosives-laden vest at the Imam Sadiq Mosque, where 2000 Shi’ite Muslims were attending Friday prayers. The attack killed 27 people and injured 227 others. The suicide bomber, Fahd Suliman Abdul-Muhsen al-Qabaa, was a citizen of Saudi Arabia and had flown into Kuwait mere hours before the strike and was in the country illegally. The attack was claimed by ISIL in a video of al-Qabaa published posthumously.

In response to this attack, the Kuwaiti Ministry of Labor and Social Affairs ordered the permanent shutdown of the Fahd Al-Ahmed Charity which it suspected of financing extremist groups in Syria linked to the bombing.

== External sources ==
- Remarks of Under Secretary for Terrorism and Financial Intelligence David Cohen before the Center for a New American Security on "Confronting New Threats in Terrorist Financing, U.S. Department of Treasury, 2014-03-04.
