= 2015 Quetta bus bombing =

Terrorist incident in Pakistan

- Part of War in North-West Pakistan
- Location of Balochistan in Pakistan
- Location: Quetta, Balochistan, Pakistan
- Date: 19 October 2015
- Target: Bus
- Deaths: 11
- Injuries: 22
- Perpetrator: unknown

The 2015 Quetta bus bombing occurred on 19 October 2015 in Quetta a city in Balochistan. The blast killed at least 11 people and injured another 22. The authorities said that a timed device had been used to trigger the explosion, ripped apart the roof of the vehicle.

== See also ==
- 2014 Mastung bus bombing
- 2015 Karachi bus shooting
- List of terrorist incidents, 2015
- Terrorist incidents in Pakistan in 2015
