= Al-Awazim =

Large tribe in the Arabian Peninsula

Al-Awazem (Arabic: العوازم; also spelled Azmi and Awazem) is a large tribal confederation in the Arabian Peninsula, Syria, Lebanon, Jordan and Egypt; with the majority of its current settled population residing in Kuwait, northeastern Saudi Arabia, and Bahrain. The Awazim tribe delineate into several branches within, with the Shgifa (Arabic: شقفة) being the most prominent in Kuwait. The Shgifa branch of Awazim are often referred to as "Sea-faring Bedouins" due to their relationship to maritime trade, fishing, and proximity to the ocean. Several notable Nokhadhas from the Awazem families include, Mufreh Al Asfar, Saleh Al Udhaynah, Hajrah and Khalaf bin Uqail, and Ubaid Abu Labga.

== Origin ==
According to historical documents, they descend from the Azem bin Hind bin Hilal bin Nufayl bin Rabiah bin Kilab bin Rabiah bin Amer bin Sa`sa bin Muawiyah bin Bakr bin Hawazin bin Mansour bin Ikrimah bin Khasfa bin Qais Aylan bin Mudar bin Nizar bin Ma`d bin Adnan, which goes back to the Islamic Prophet Ishmael, son of Abraham.

They predominantly originated from Hejaz in western Arabia, they migrated to the eastern parts of the Arabian Peninsula by the year 1700 CE. The main reason why they migrate is the war between Al-Awazim and the Hejaz vilayet. The second reasons is the large scale famine of Najd in 1703 CE.

== History ==
- Al Awazem were among the only tribes to have fought the Ottomans, Achaemenids (Iranians), and Bani Rasheed. They once fought seven tribes to protect the Emirate of Diriyah.
- Al Awazem historically had very strong alliances with Bani Khalid and Al Kathiri in most of the wars.
- With Al Awazem being the largest tribe in Kuwait, Al Awazem were among the first tribal groups to inhabit Kuwait City. They assisted Kuwait with commanders such as Mubarak Al Duraya, Falah bn Jamea (their current leader), and Khalf ibn athbiya.
- In Bahrain, Shaikh Musaed Al-Azmi who was the first Kuwaiti doctor in Bahrain's history and his descendants have been living in Bahrain for over 125 years.

== Paternal Dna Results ==
According To the University Of Sheffield Study About The Genetic structure of nomadic Bedouin from Kuwait The Result Is 3% R-M124 24% E-M123 73% J-M267
