= Terrorism in Saudi Arabia =

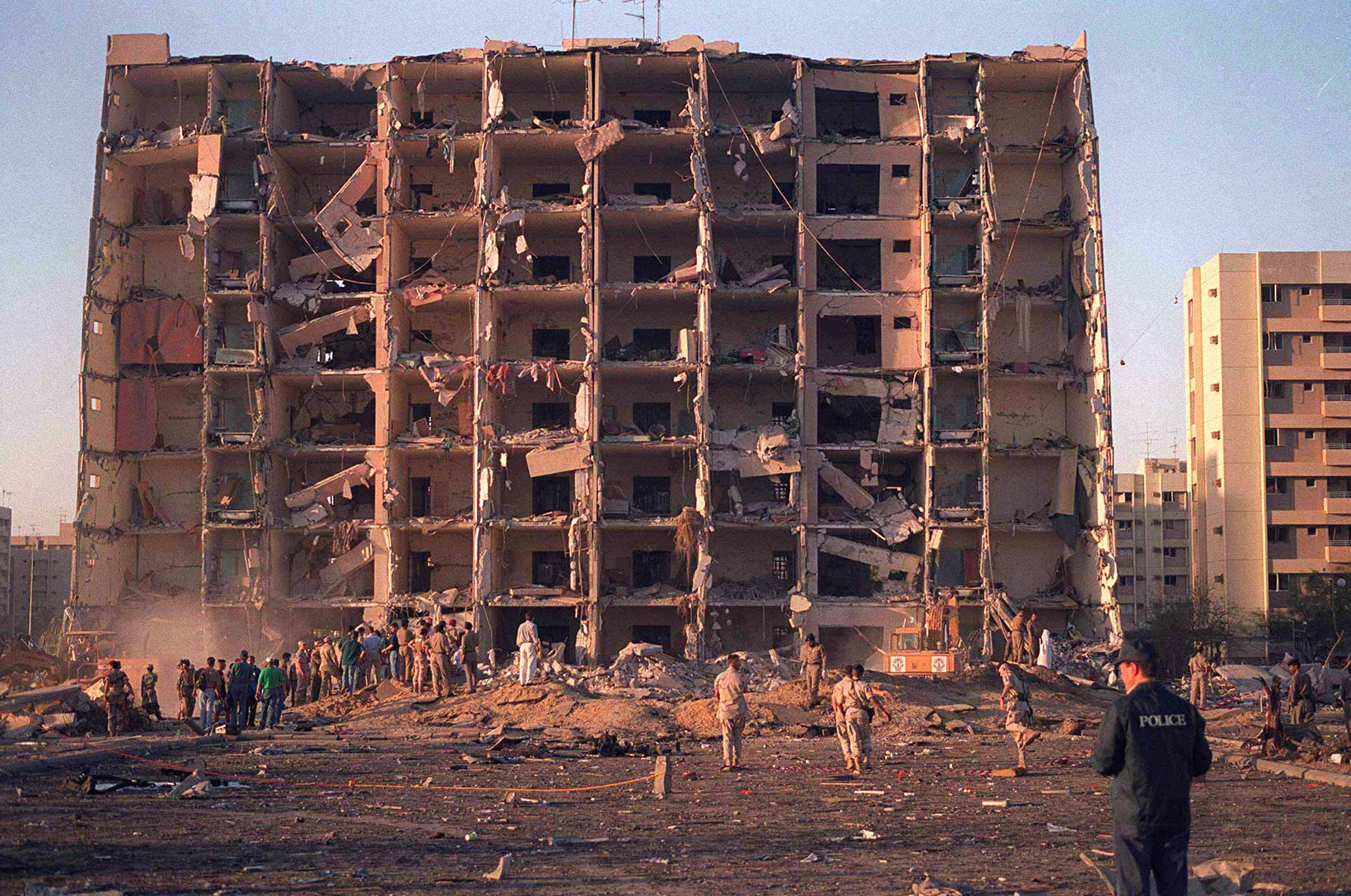
The aftermath of the Khobar Towers bombing in 1996

Terrorist incidents in Saudi Arabia
| Year | Incidents | Deaths | Injured |
| 2019 | 1 | 0 | 3 |
| 2016 | 124 | 161 | 198 |
| 2015 | 103 | 213 | 281 |
| 2014 | 14 | 20 | 23 |
| 2013 | 6 | 1 | 2 |
| 2012 | 6 | 4 | 10 |
| 2011 | 2 | 3 | 15 |
| 2010 | 0 | 0 | 0 |
| 2009 | 3 | 5 | 13 |
| 2008 | 0 | 0 | 0 |
| 2007 | 2 | 3 | 1 |
| 2006 | 3 | 4 | 8 |
| 2005 | 1 | 1 | 0 |
| 2004 | 17 | 64 | 293 |
| 2003 | 8 | 55 | 128 |
| 2002 | 2 | 1 | 0 |
| 2001 | 3 | 2 | 7 |
| 2000 | 5 | 1 | 5 |
| 1999 | 0 | 0 | 0 |
| 1998 | 0 | 0 | 0 |
| 1997 | 0 | 0 | 0 |
| 1996 | 1 | 19 | 386 |
| 1995 | 3 | 14 | 161 |
| 1994 | 2 | 0 | 0 |
| 1993 | 0 | 0 | 0 |
| 1992 | 0 | 0 | 0 |
| 1991 | 2 | 0 | 6 |
| 1990 | 0 | 0 | 0 |
| 1989 | 3 | 1 | 16 |
| 1988 | 1 | 0 | 0 |
| 1987 | 0 | 0 | 0 |
| 1986 | 1 | 62 | 32 |
| 1985 | 2 | 1 | 3 |
| 1984 | 2 | 0 | 1 |
| 1983 | 0 | 0 | 0 |
| 1982 | 0 | 0 | 0 |
| 1981 | 0 | 0 | 0 |
| 1980 | 0 | 0 | 0 |
| 1979 | 1 | 5 | 10 |
| 1978 | 0 | 0 | 0 |
| 1977 | 1 | 0 | 0 |
| 1976 | 0 | 0 | 0 |
| 1975 | 0 | 0 | 0 |
| 1974 | 0 | 0 | 0 |
| 1973 | 0 | 0 | 0 |
| 1972 | 0 | 0 | 0 |
| 1971 | 0 | 0 | 0 |
| 1970 | 0 | 0 | 0 |

Terrorism in Saudi Arabia has mainly been attributed to Islamic extremists and jihadism. Their targets included foreign civilians—Westerners affiliated with its oil-based economy—as well as Saudi Arabian civilians and security forces. Anti-Western attacks have occurred in Saudi Arabia dating back to 1995. The Saudi government itself has been accused of funding terrorism in other countries, including Syria, as well as fomenting religious extremism by promoting its ultra-conservative Wahhabi interpretation of Islam.

== Background ==
The US military sent forces to Saudi Arabia in 1990 after Saddam Hussein invaded Kuwait. After the US-led coalition won the 1991 Gulf War, it led to bases elsewhere but several thousand service members, mostly associated with Operation Southern Watch, remained. Many Muslims were upset at the U.S. presence, as it violated a Muslim tradition of excluding non-Muslim from permanent residence in the Arabian peninsula. It is believed this is one of, if not the main reason Osama bin Laden called for jihad against the United States. There were no attacks against American forces and Westerners in the country until after 1995.

After the September 11, 2001 attacks, there was continued world pressure for the Saudi government to crack down on the imams preaching anti-American rhetoric in Saudi mosques. These calls grew as it turned out that 15 of the 19 hijackers were from Saudi Arabia. Saudi officials pledged to make efforts to crack down on these imams.

It's estimated that some 4000 Saudi nationals are held as "security prisoners" in the country's jails, which means support for either Al-Qaeda or the Islamic State, and which includes scholars like Nasir al-Fahd and Ali al-Khudair, while the foreigners detained on terrorism charges number more than 1000, most of them being from Yemen, with 358 individuals.

The Interior Ministry issued further regulations designating an initial list of groups the government considers terrorist organizations, including the Muslim Brotherhood and the Houthi group in Yemen, along with "Al-Qaeda, Al-Qaeda in the Arabian Peninsula, Al-Qaeda in Yemen, Al-Qaeda in Iraq, Daesh [the Islamic State of Iraq and Sham, or ISIS], Jabhat al-Nusra, and Hezbollah inside the kingdom."

== Timeline ==
=== 2000 ===
On 17 November, in central Riyadh at the junction of Oruba/Olaya road, a car bomb killed British national Christopher Rodway and injured his wife Jane. The bomb was placed underneath his vehicle and detonated as it approached a traffic signal.

The following week on 22 November, in Riyadh close to the RSAF HQ, a car bomb detonated on a vehicle driven by British national Steve Coughlan. Although the driver and his three passengers were injured, all survived the attack.

Less than one month later on 15 December in Al Khobar, a small IED in a juice carton left on the vehicle (in the parking lot of the Souks Supermarket – now Panda) of British national David Brown exploded as he attempted to remove it. Brown survived but lost his sight and part of his right hand.

=== 2001 ===
On 10 January, a small bomb exploded outside the Euromarche supermarket in Riyadh. There were no casualties.

A bomb placed in a waste bin outside the Jarir bookstore on Oleya Road in central Riyadh on 15 March injured British national Ron Jones. Jones, American Charles Bayar, and Canadian David Soni, all employees of Saudi Basic Industries Corporation (SABIC), were taken from hospital and arrested by Saudi authorities. During detention, Jones was subjected to torture to extract a 'confession' before being released without charge after 67 days. Soni was treated similarly, and released along with Jones. Unable to work due to their harsh treatment in detention, Jones and Soni left Saudi Arabia soon thereafter. Bayar was held in solitary confinement, was closely interrogated but not tortured, did not sign any confession, and was released after 11 days without charge after the U.S. State Department (through the behind-the-scenes efforts of Bayar's wife Julia, a former Washington DC lobbyist, which secured the intercession of Bayar's local U.S. congressman and U.S. Senator Jack Reed (D-RI), a West Point classmate of Bayar's) issued a formal demarche to the Saudi Government demanding consular access to Bayar. He returned to work at SABIC but left Saudi Arabia without authorization in January 2002 to resume his law practice in New York.

On 3 May, an American doctor Gary Hatch received injuries to his face and hands after opening a parcel bomb in his office in Al Khobar. On the eve of the U.S. strike on Afghanistan on 6 October, a pedestrian suicide bomber (who Saudi authorities claim to have been a Palestinian dentist) killed a 33-year-old American employee of Halliburton from Duncan, Oklahoma: Michael Jerrald Martin, outside the popular Metropolitan Store (Mushiri Trading) in Al Khobar. An American co-worker, Keith Maples, was also injured, as well as one Briton and two Filipinos.

15 November an acid-filled bottle was thrown at the car of a German family in Riyadh. Some of these men were sentenced to death, but were spared.

==== Alleged Western involvement ====
For all the attacks on Westerners in Saudi between November 2000 and May 2003 there is no public statement of any investigation or prosecution, except for the Saudi accusations against 'alcohol traders', a small group of western expatriates, mainly British, who Saudi authorities claimed were fighting a turf war over the illegal distribution of alcohol and were behind the car bombings. All of those involved in the 'alcohol trade' were arrested and detained.

The suspects were well-paid professionals with no prior record of violent crime. The Saudi Mabahith investigators of the crimes provided no forensic evidence against them, showed no interest in alcohol trading in their interrogation of suspects and in charges brought against detainees, and attacks of a very similar nature on western nationals continued despite the arrests of the alleged perpetrators. According to author Thomas Hegghammer, "today, few outside Saudi Arabia believe that alcohol traders carried out the bombings".

Early in 2001, video taped 'confessions' by William Sampson and Sandy Mitchell were aired on Saudi state TV channels. Apart from the confessions, which both men later retracted, there was no evidence to link any of the western detainees to the bombing campaign. Sampson and Mitchell were later sentenced to death but were eventually released (but not pardoned) along with several other British detainees in August 2003 in a prisoner exchange deal brokered by the UK and US for Saudi detainees from Guantanamo Bay. Both men maintain their innocence, citing torture was used to extract 'confessions.' Court action taken in the UK by the men since their release failed after the UK High Court supported Saudi Arabia's defense under the State Immunity Act 1978.

Those charged with the murders were accused of carrying out the attacks on behalf of MI6, the British Secret Intelligence Service. Diplomats from the British Embassy in Riyadh were investigated by Scotland Yard and cleared of any involvement. One of those investigated was Deputy Head of Mission in Riyadh, Simon McDonald, who was later appointed British Ambassador to Israel. Although British Embassy officials in Riyadh were aware of the continuing abuse of detainees, they failed to secure the support of the Foreign and Commonwealth Office in London in pushing hard for their release.

=== 2002 ===
In May, a Sudanese national attempted to shoot down a U.S. fighter jet taking off from the Prince Sultan Air Base with an SA-7 missile. The attempt failed, and in June the Saudis arrested several suspects.

On 5 June an Australian was shot at by a sniper in Tabuk.

A month later on 20 June, in the Riyadh suburb of Al-Nakheel, a British national, Simon Veness, a 35-year-old bank employee, was killed after a bomb placed underneath his vehicle exploded a few seconds after he set off for work.

On 29 June, a car bomb placed on the vehicle of an American couple in Riyadh was disarmed by Saudi authorities.

On 29 September, a car bomb killed German national Max Graf in central Riyadh.

=== 2003 ===
In early February a gunman fired at an Australian expatriate in Khamis Mushayt.

On 20 February, Robert Dent, an employee for BAE Systems was shot to death in his car while waiting at a traffic signal in the Granada district of Riyadh.

A Saudi was killed on 18 March in an explosion at a villa in the Al-Jazira district of Riyadh where police uncovered a cache of arms and explosives. It is believed that he was manufacturing a bomb at the time.

On 1 May, a Saudi dressed in Saudi naval uniform penetrated an American base and killed an American before getting away unhurt.

At a house in the same district of Riyadh on 6 May, police were involved in a shootout with suspected militants. All nineteen suspects escaped and police unearthed another large cache of arms and explosives.

The insurgency took a giant leap forward with the Riyadh Compound Bombings; on 12 May, attackers drove three car bombs into residential compounds housing Westerners and others, killing 26 people. Nine bombers also died.

The compound bombings led to a crackdown against militants by the Saudi government who until this point had denied there was a terrorist threat within the Kingdom. Police and National Guard troops were involved in hundreds of raids, seizing weapons and equipment used by the militants.

On 8 November, hours after the U.S. embassy issued a warning about attacks in Saudi Arabia, a truck bomb struck the al-Mohaya residential compound in Riyadh, killing 17 workers and injured more than 100. Most of the victims were Muslims, prompting outcry among Saudi citizens.

==== Alleged inside involvement ====
According to an American intelligence sources quoted by The Daily Telegraph, 12 May bombers' operation "depended on a significant level of insider knowledge of the compounds," and this and other evidence indicates that al-Qaeda has infiltrated even the elite National Guard, which is involved in compound security. In both 2003 bombings of compounds, bombers wore uniforms of security forces.

=== 2004 ===
After the Muhaya bombing, militants either halted or were prevented from committing their attacks. Security forces continued their raids and arrests. On 21 April, a car bomb struck a building originally used by the Saudi police, killing five and injuring 148. This marked the start of a new campaign by the militants.

On 1 May, the 2004 Yanbu attack left six Westerners and a Saudi dead. One victim was tied to a car and dragged through the street.

On 22 May, German chef Hermann Dengl was shot to death in Riyadh at an automated teller machine by Panda exit 10.

On 29–30 May, the militants staged one of their bloodiest attacks, killing 22 and injuring 25—mainly foreign workers—in the oil-industry town of Khobar. The four gunmen took dozens hostage, attacking three buildings over a 25-hour period—including the Oasis compound, which houses the employees of foreign oil companies. According to witnesses, they separated Christian and Muslim workers they found and shot the Christians. Of those killed, 19 were foreign civilians, three were Saudis. As in the Yanbu attack one (foreign) victim was killed by being tied to the back of a vehicle and dragged through the street. Three of the four gunmen escaped.

On 6 June, gunmen shot and killed an Irish cameraman of the BBC, Simon Cumbers, and also wounded reporter Frank Gardner.

On 8 June, American Robert Jacobs of Vinnell Corp. was shot in his Riyadh villa.

Another American expatriate, Kenneth Scroggs, was shot to death by two gunmen outside his home in Riyadh on 13 June, and an American working for Lockheed Martin, Paul Marshall Johnson, was kidnapped at a fake police checkpoint in Riyadh.

On 18 June, Johnson was reported beheaded in a video released to the news media. On the same day, Saudi security forces killed Abdel Aziz al-Muqrin, at that time the country's most wanted man.

On 3 August, Anthony Higgins, an Irish expatriate, was shot and killed at his desk at the Saudi-owned Rocky for Trade and Construction company, in the Al Rawda district of Riyadh. The attackers' use of silencers on the pistols led investigators to believe it was an act of premeditated murder and not simply an act terrorism aimed indiscriminately at the expatriate community. Tony, who had worked in the Kingdom for almost 25 years, had been an active member of Saudi Arabia's underground church and although unconfirmed, most who knew him, believe he was gunned down for his impassioned but indiscreet efforts to spread the Christian faith within Saudi Arabia.

On 15 September, Edward Muirhead-Smith, a British man working for Marconi, was shot to death in his car outside a supermarket in Riyadh.

On 26 September, Frenchman Laurent Barbot, an employee of a defense electronics firm, was shot to death in his car in Jeddah.

On 6 December, militants staged perhaps their most brazen attack, the storming of the American consulate in Jeddah with explosives and machine guns. They breached the compound's outer wall and fought their way into the complex killing four security guards and five staff, taking 18 staff and visa applicants hostage. Saudi security forces stormed the building, killing three attackers, and then proceeded to wound and arrest two others. Among the killed were a Yemeni, a Sudanese, a Filipino, a Pakistani and a Sri Lankan—all employees of the consulate. About ten others were wounded.

On 29 December, suicide car bombs exploded outside of the Saudi Interior Ministry and the Special Emergency Force training center, killing a passerby and wounding several others. Though damage to each building was incurred, the attacks did not result in large-scale casualties, and was the last significant attack of the insurgency. Two suicide bombers were killed.

=== 2005 ===
Saudi security forces made a great deal of successes against insurgents. Many militants were captured and several killed, many by American forces in Iraq. One of these, Saleh al-Oufi, who was killed on 18 August.

Saudi security forces and Al-Qaeda cell members waged a three-day gunfight starting 3 April in the town of Al-Ras in the Qassim region. Security men killed 14 militants, wounded six others and captured three. Among the dead were Saud bin Hommoud Al Quatii, a weapons smuggler, explosives expert and Afghanistan veteran, and Kareem Al Tihami Idriss Al Mejjati, a Moroccan extremist suspected of bombings in Casablanca. Other slain militants included ani Bin Abdullah Al Joaithen, a suspect in the Al-Muayya residential compound bombing in Riyadh in November 2003; Faisal bin Muhammad Al Baidhani, an explosives expert responsible for the December 2004 bombing of the Ministry of Interior building and emergency forces headquarters; Majed bin Muhammad Al Masoud, Fawaz Mufdi Al Anazi, Abdul Rahman bin Abdullah Al Jarboue, Nawaf bin Naif Al Hafi and Abdussalam bin Suleiman Al Khudairy.

On 28 December, Saudi security services killed Abdul Rahman Al-Suwailemi and Abdul Rahman ibn Salen Al-Miteb in separate incidents. In the morning, Al-Miteb was stopped by two policemen and opened fire, killing both. This set off a running firefight, during which three other policemen were killed. Automatic weapons, grenades, forged documents, and almost half a million riyals in cash were also seized.

Despite these successes, foreign governments still have travel warnings in effect for Saudi Arabia.

=== 2006 ===
While attacks by militants have decreased dramatically since late 2004, violent incidents still occasionally occur. On 24 February, two explosive-laden cars tried to enter the Abqaiq oil plant, the largest such facility in the world and producer of 60% of Saudi Arabian oil. Both cars exploded when fired upon by guards, killing the two bombers and two guards. A successful attack could have seriously crippled oil production.

In June, six militants and a policeman were killed in a gun battle in Riyadh.

=== 2007 ===
On 4 February, Saudi security forces arrested ten people suspected of fundraising for "suspicious groups" outside of Saudi Arabia that engage in terrorism. Interior Ministry spokesman Maj. Gen. Mansour Al-Turki said seven Saudi citizens and one foreign resident were arrested in Jeddah while two Saudi citizens were arrested in Medinah. Al-Turki went on to say, "We know of the group's activity as a whole but we also need to define the role of each of the arrested members." The Interior Ministry issued a statement saying, "Security forces, in the framework of their efforts to fight terrorism and its funding have arrested a group of suspects believed to be responsible for collecting donations illegally and smuggling the money to suspicious groups that use it in deceiving the sons of this nation and dragging them to disturbed areas."

In March, lawyers for some of the accused defended their clients by stating they were simply peaceful reformists. A petition was delivered to King Abdullah asking that he consider a constitutional monarchy, and was signed by 100 prominent business leaders and academics.

On 26 February, suspected militants attacked a group of nine French citizens who were returning from the historical site of Madain Saleh in the northwest of Saudi Arabia. The group, traveling in three vehicles had been looking for remnants of the Hejaz railway track and had apparently stopped for a rest approx 10 km north of Madinah when three assailants traveling in a 4x4 vehicle stopped then singled out and shot all four males in the group. Two died at the scene, a third en route to hospital and the fourth, a 17-year-old boy, died the following day after undergoing surgery to remove a bullet from his lung. No group has claimed responsibility for the attack.

On 7 March, authorities announced the arrest of several suspects and stated that they were hunting two named individuals in connection with the attack.

On 6 April, security forces were involved in a gunbattle with militants at a property 20 km outside Madinah. One of the militants, a Saudi national named as Waleed Ibn Mutlaq Al Radadi, was killed in the shootout. One police officer was also killed and several were injured. Al Radadi had appeared on a list of 36 most-wanted terrorists in 2005. An Interior Ministry spokesman said that the shootout was linked to an investigation into the killings of the French expatriates in February.

On 19 April, Saudi authorities announced the arrest of eight people who had allegedly aided and abetted in the killings of the French expatriates in February. They also stated that Al Radadi had been the mastermind behind the killings.

On 27 April, the Saudi Interior Ministry announced the arrest of 172 terrorist suspects in a series of raids on seven cells in the Kingdom in an operation lasting several months. The largest of the cells numbered 61 members. Unprecedented amounts of explosives and weapons of various types were uncovered after being buried in the desert. Also recovered was over $US5 million in cash. Some of the cells had trained as pilots and planned attacks on military and oil installations as well as the assassinations of high-profile individuals. Most of the suspects were said to be Saudi nationals.

On 28 November, security forces arrested 208 terrorist suspects across the country.

=== 2009 ===
On 28 August, A suicide bomber blew himself up in Jeddah during a Ramadan gathering that included Prince Mohammed bin Nayef, head of the security services. It was the first attempt on the life of a royal since the murder of King Faisal in 1975. The prince was treated at a hospital and released.

=== 2011 ===
On 26 June 2011, the Specialized Criminal Court, a non-Sharia court created in 2008, started hearing charges including "possessing explosives, missiles, military weapons, and chemical materials and smuggling said items into the country for terrorist acts on behalf of al-Qaeda" against 85 people. The charges included involvement in the Riyadh compound bombings.

In September 2011, 38 Saudi citizens and three others suspected of being involved in al-Qaeda appeared in the Specialized Criminal Court on charges including "training in militant camps in Pakistan, fighting in Iraq [with] Abu Musab al-Zarqawi, financing terrorism, transporting weapons, forging documents, inciting militants to fight in Iraq and [harbouring] suspected [terrorists]".

An unnamed 45-year-old woman was tried in the Specialized Criminal Court starting on 31 July 2011. On 29 October 2011 she was sentenced to 15 years' imprisonment for "sheltering people wanted for security related matters and inciting terror acts in the kingdom, possessing two pistols [that she gave to militants] and financing terrorism and terror acts through collecting more than 1,000,000 Saudi riyals ... and sending the money to [al-Qaeda]." The woman denied the charges and said that she had been kidnapped by two al-Qaeda members with whom she had previously been married.

=== 2012 ===
On 26 August 2012, special security police arrested two Saudis and six Yemenis from cells operating in Riyadh and Jeddah. The men had been in contact with al-Qaeda outside the Kingdom. The police recovered an extensive stockpile of explosives and bomb-making equipment from a mosque in Riyadh. The men had built and tested explosive devices in the desert outside the city. Authorities said they were still looking for two further suspects: Saleh Muhammad Al-Sehaibani and Ali Nasser Asiri.

=== 2014 ===
In March 2014, the Saudi interior ministry issued a royal decree branding all 'deviants' as terrorists, which defines terrorism as "calling for deviant thought in any form, or calling into question the fundamentals of the Islamic religion on which this country is based".

In May 2014, a 62-person terror cell was discovered plotting to assassinate officials and attack government targets. The group was composed mostly of Saudi nationals, with links to Al Qaeda (AQAP) and the Islamic State of Iraq and the Levant (ISIL). They had plenty of cash and a facility to make bombs, IEDs and electronic jammers, together with large quantities of arms and explosives smuggled across the border from Yemen. 35 of the Saudis who were arrested had previously been detained for terrorism offences and released under the country's rehabilitation program. Another 44 members of the cell are believed to be on the run. The group was based in Abha, near the border with Yemen.

On 4 July 2014, six people, including two security guards, were killed in a terrorist attack on the Wadi border post, a border crossing between Yemen and Saudi Arabia about 200 miles east of Najran. The next day, as the military was carrying out operations following the skirmish, two militants who were surrounded in a government building blew themselves up in a suicide explosion, according to a Saudi television channel report. Al-Qaeda in the Arabian Peninsula released a video of the attack on the border post and inside the Saudi town of Sharurah. The U.S. State Department issued a travel warning to Saudi Arabia based on the attack, which also restricts prohibits U.S. government personnel from traveling within 50 miles of the Yemeni border without embassy permission, which includes the cities of Jizan and Najran.

=== 2015 ===
On 22 May 2015, a suicide bomber attacked the Imam Ali mosque in the village of al-Qadeeh, in Qatif governorate during Friday prayers. The Saudi health minister told state television that at least 21 people had been killed and more than 80 injured in the blast. IS later claimed responsibility for the attack.

On 29 May 2015, a suicide bomber blew himself up near a Shiite mosque in Dammam and killed four people. The bomber tried to enter the Mosque during Friday prayers and detonated his bomb in the parking lot after being stopped by security guards.

On 6 August, the 2015 Abha mosque bombing, carried out by a suicide bomber, kills 17 people at a mosque in the south-western Saudi city of Abha.

On 26 October 2015, a suicide bomber murdered 2 people and wounded 26 in a Shia Ismaili mosque in the southern city of Najran. The bomber, a Saudi national who recently returned from fighting for IS in Syria, was blocked from entering the center of the mosque by a 95-year-old man, which limited the terrorist's death toll.

=== 2016 ===
On 8 February 2016, a carbomb exploded in Riyadh without causing injuries. IS claimed responsibility.

The 2016 Saudi Arabia bombings killed four Police Officers outside the Prophet's Mosque in Medina just before evening prayers and breaking of the fast, with co-ordinated bomb attacks also against the U.S. embassy in Jeddah, and targets in Qatif. The latter two attacks failed to cause any casualties.

=== 2017 ===
On 7 January 2017, two IS terrorists were killed by police in the Al Yasmin suburb of Riyadh. The two men were named as Tayea Salem bin Yaslam Al-Sayari, wanted for previous acts of terrorism, and Talal bin Samran Al-Saedi, who had been released from the Saudi terrorist rehabilitation program. The police officer who killed the terrorists, Cpl. Gibran Jaber Awagy (alternative spelling Jabran Awaji), was injured in the gun battle.

On 9 March 2017, a police officer was killed by an IS member. Then the perpetrator was killed by the police.

=== 2018 ===
On 8 July 2018, a member of the Saudi Arabian security forces and a foreign citizen were killed when three armed men opened fire from a car at a checkpoint in Buraidah in the Saudi Arabian region of Al-Qassim. Two of the attackers were also killed and another injured in the ensuing gunfight. The Islamic State claimed responsibility for the attack.

=== 2019 ===
In 2019, Saudi Arabia revoked the citizenship of Hamza bin Laden, son of Al-Qaeda leader Osama bin Laden. Hamza had become a prominent figure in the world of terrorism.

In 2019, Saudi Arabia has been granted a full membership of the Financial Action Task Force (FATF) becoming the first Arab country awarded this full membership. This was following the group's Annual General Meeting in Orlando. The group is responsible for designing and issuing standards and policies that face money laundering, terrorist financing.

== See also ==
- Alleged Saudi role in September 11 attacks
- Islamic terrorism in Europe
- List of terrorist incidents
- Terrorism in the United States
- Hindu terrorism
- Violence against Muslims in independent India
- Left-wing terrorism
- Right-wing terrorism
