= Gyorgy Busztin =

Hungarian diplomat

Deputy Special Representative of the UN to Iraq
- In office December 9, 2011 – November 1, 2017

Hungarian Ambassador to Iran
- In office October 2007 – July 2011

Hungarian Ambassador to Indonesia
- In office October 2001 – July 2006

Civilian Head of Mission, Hungarian Provincial Reconstruction Team
- In office September 2006 – 2007

Personal details
- Born: Busztin György; 13 April 1955 (age 71) Budapest, Hungary
- Education: Eötvös Loránd University University of Damascus
- Occupation: Diplomat, author

Gyorgy Busztin (born 13 April 1955) is a career diplomat who was appointed Deputy Special Representative (ASG) of the United Nations Assistance Mission for Iraq by Secretary-General of the United Nations, Ban Ki-moon. He previously served the Hungarian Ministry of Foreign Affairs in various capacities throughout Africa, Asia and the Middle East, as ambassador on two occasions. In 2011, he served as the European Union President in Iran. He is fluent in six languages in addition to his native Hungarian.

== Early life and education ==
Born in 1955 in Budapest, Hungary, Busztin holds a degree in Arabic history from Damascus University, Syria and a Doctorate in Arabic language and Semitic philology from Loránd Eötvös University in Hungary.

In addition to his native language, he speaks English, French, Arabic, Farsi/Dari (Persian), Malay (Indonesian), and Russian. He first spent time in Indonesia as a grade school student and would later return to the island country as Hungary's Ambassador between 2001 and 2006.

== Career ==
Busztin has served the Hungarian Ministry of Foreign Affairs in various capacities for over three decades. He worked as a counselor in the Department of the Middle East and Africa between 1980 and 1986 prior to being appointed First Secretary at the Hungarian Embassy in Egypt between 1986 and 1991. He was later nominated Chargé d'Affaires in Libya between 1994 and 1998.

He was appointed Hungary's Ambassador to Indonesia between 2001 and 2005 and subsequently to Iran between 2007 and 2011. His tenure in Iran coincided with Hungary's Presidency of the Council of the European Union.

In 2006, he was the Civilian Head of Mission for the Hungarian Provincial Reconstruction Team, at the time operating in Pol-i-Khumri, as part of Hungary's efforts to help stabilize conditions in Afghanistan.

In a press release in December 2011, it was reported that United Nations Secretary-General Ban Ki-moon had appointed the Ambassador to succeed Jerzy Skuratowicz as the Deputy Special Representative for Iraq. At the level of Assistant Secretary-General, he heads the political, analytical, electoral and constitutional support component of the United Nations Assistance Mission for Iraq. His condemnation of violence throughout the nation has frequently been the subject of, or reported by international news.

In addition to his native Hungarian, he speaks English, French, Arabic, Farsi/Dari (Persian), Malay (Indonesian), and Russian. As "acting head" of UNAMI, he has been quoted on matters ranging from Iranian dissidents in Iraq to violent extremism occurring in the onset of political turmoil.

== Literature ==
He authored The Legacy of the Barang People: The Puzzling Similarities of the Hungarian and Malay languages. The research shows close ties between the two languages and "postulates that the roots of Malay extend much deeper in time than previously thought."
