= 2004 Yanbu attack =

Terrorist incident in Saudi Arabia

2004 Yanbu Attack
- Location: Yanbu, Saudi Arabia
- Date: May 1, 2004
- Attack type: Mass shooting
- Deaths: 7
- Injuries: 18

The 2004 Yanbu attack was an attack by gunmen against Westerners on May 1, 2004, in Yanbu' al Bahr, Saudi Arabia.

At least four militants used security passes to access a local petrochemical plant. Once on the grounds of the facility, they stormed the offices of the Texas-based ABB Lummus and killed seven people. Two were Americans, two were British, one was Australian and one was a Saudi National Guard member. A Canadian worker died on May 15 of his severe wounds.

The attackers were believed to be linked to Al Qaeda, though Crown Prince Abdullah, then de facto ruler of Saudi Arabia, disputed these claims at the time. From 2003 to 2004, militants carried out attacks against the Saudi government and foreigners living there in an effort to topple the monarchy. Less than a month after these attacks, gunmen staged a similar attack in Al-Khobar, killing 22.

== See also ==
- Insurgency in Saudi Arabia
