= Qatif and Dammam mosque bombings =

- Location of Eastern Province in Saudi Arabia
- Location: 26.567374°N 49.991668°E; Qatif & Dammam, Eastern Province, Saudi Arabia
- Date: 22 May 2015 Qatif; 29 May 2015 Dammam
- Target: Shia Muslims
- Attack type: Suicide bombing; Terrorist attack
- Deaths: 22 in Qatif; 4 in Dammam
- Injuries: 102 in Qatif; 4 in Dammam
- Perpetrator: Islamic State of Iraq and the Levant

Qatif and Dammam mosque bombings (Saudi Arabia)

The Qatif and Dammam mosque bombings occurred on 22 and 29 May 2015. On Friday May 22, a suicide bomber attacked the Shia Imam Ali ibn Abi Talib Mosque situated in Qudeih village of Qatif city in Eastern Province, Saudi Arabia. The Islamic State claimed responsibility for the blast, which killed at least 21 people. The incident was the second deadly attack against Shia in six months.

== Background ==
An estimated 14-15% of the approximately 16 million natives of Saudi Arabia are Shia Muslim. Most Shia Muslims live in the oil-rich areas of the Eastern Province that Qatif is located in. The government of Saudi Arabia follows the strict Sunni Islamic Wahhabi movement, which dominates religious institutions, courts and education of the kingdom and believes that Shia Muslims are not true Muslims; thus Shia have alleged severe discrimination in Saudi Arabia. According to a 2009 Human Rights Watch report, Shia citizens in Saudi Arabia "face systematic discrimination in religion, education, justice, and employment". In the weekly sermons in the mosques, Shia are regularly denounced as heretics and infidels.

Critics argue that the government has done little to address rising sectarian tensions in the country. The country is built on the Wahhabi creed of Islam, whose ideology shares many similarities with that of the Islamic State. Hours before the bombing, one imam in Riyadh was quoted as telling devout worshippers at the end of Friday prayers: "Allah, attack all the Shia everywhere; Allah, send them earthquakes; Allah, kill them all."

== Qatif bombing ==
In Saudi Arabia, several attacks against the Shia minority have been reported. The suicide bombing at the Imam Ali ibn Abi Talib Mosque in Qatif was among the deadliest. 150 people had reportedly been present in the mosque for Friday prayers; the attack killed 23 people. While similar suicide bombings have occurred in Pakistan, Iraq and other Muslim countries, this was the first time in Saudi history that a mosque had been attacked in such a manner during the Friday prayers.

== Responsibility ==
In an online statement, the Islamic State claimed responsibility, saying their soldiers were behind the attack; they identified the suicide bomber as one Abu Amer Al-Najdi and claimed he had detonated his explosive belt. An Islamic State-affiliated Twitter account posted an image of a suicide bomber they say had been involved in the attack. Saudi authorities, however, identified Saudi national Salih bin Abdurrahman Salih Al Ghishaami as the suicide bomber.

== Reactions ==
Doctor Fahd bin Saad al-Majed, general secretary of the Council of Senior Scholars, condemned the attack and asserted that terrorists intent on harming the unity of the Saudi people and destabilizing the kingdom could never be successful. Saudi Arabia's top cleric, Grand Mufti Abdulaziz Al Sheikh, also condemned the attack as "a crime, shame and great sin".

A statement from UN secretary general Ban Ki-moon condemned the attack, noting "such attacks on places of worship are abhorrent and intended to promote sectarian conflict."

- Pakistan: Foreign Office spokesman Qazi Khalilullah condemned the attack in a statement and said "We share the grief of the brotherly people of the Kingdom of Saudi Arabia over this cowardly and deliberate attack against innocent civilians." Pakistani ambassador Manzur Ul-Haq condemned the bombing and stated further that Pakistan strongly condemned the brutal act which caused loss of lives of many people and harmed several innocents. The Pakistani embassy postponed their evening community function scheduled for that day in solidarity.
- Bangladesh: Bangladeshi ambassador Golam Moshi condemned the attack, stating that the terrible crime is unbearable and we are ready to cooperate with Saudi Arabia to maintain peace and security.
- Sri Lanka: Sri Lankan ambassador Mohammad Hussein Mohammad condemned the attack, calling for those responsible to be brought to justice.
- United Arab Emirates: Dr. Anwar bin Mohammed Gargash, minister of state for foreign affairs, reaffirmed that the UAE discards all kinds of terrorism without any distinction of religious and moral values. He also stated that "Such a heinous crime requires the international community to rally efforts to confront such cowardly acts and devious thoughts, which pay no respect to human lives and sacred places".

== Funeral procession ==
Half a million people participated in funeral processions for the victims. The victims were buried following funeral prayers held in the Qadeeh market square on 25 May. Black flags of mourning flew in the streets of Qatif, where police erected checkpoints while volunteers in bright yellow and orange vests inspected vehicles. The procession stretched for over three miles from different settlements in the province to the burial site.

== Follow-up bombing ==
On Friday, 29 May 2015, exactly one week after the Qatif bombing, another suicide bomber detonated in the parking lot of a Shia mosque in Dammam, a coastal city located 70 kilometers (45 miles) from the Persian Gulf.

Preliminary reporting revealed that the explosion was a result of car bomb blast. In fact the explosion happened when the 19-year-old Khalid Ayed Mohammed Wahhabi Shammari, dressed in an explosives belt and female clothing, blew himself up at the gate as mosque security approached to check his identity. Four people, mostly from one family, were killed in the attack; and three were injured.

== See also ==
- 2015 Arar attack
- Shia Islam in Saudi Arabia
- Human rights in Saudi Arabia
- Kuwait mosque bombing
- Persecution of Shias by the Islamic State
