= 2015 Kuwait mosque bombing =

Bombing at a Shia mosque in Kuwait on 26 June 2015

Kuwait mosque bombing
- Part of 2015 Ramadan attacks and Spillover of the Syrian Civil War
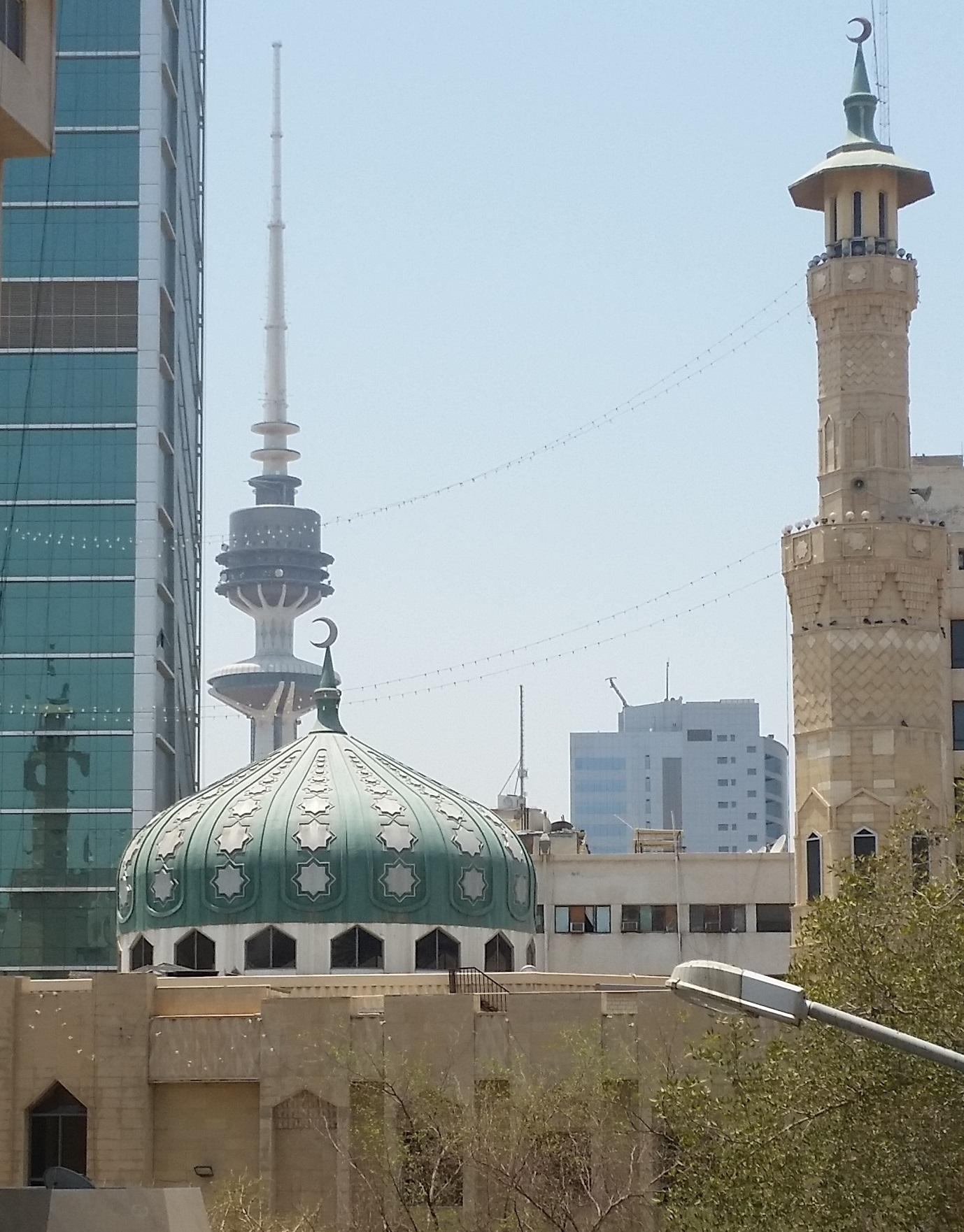

- Location within Kuwait
- Location: 29°22′36″N 47°58′35″E al-Imam as-Sadiq Mosque; Kuwait City, Kuwait
- Date: 26 June 2015; 12PM (GMT+3)
- Target: Shia Muslims
- Attack type: Suicide bombing
- Deaths: 28 (including the perpetrator)
- Injuries: 227
- Perpetrators: Fahd Suleiman al-Qabba (Saudi national); Islamic State of Iraq and the Levant
- Motive: Anti-Shia sentiment

The 2015 Kuwait mosque bombing was a suicide bombing took place on 26 June 2015 at a Shia mosque in Kuwait City, Kuwait. The Islamic State of Iraq and the Levant claimed responsibility for the attack. Sabah al-Sabah, the Emir at the time, arrived at the location of the incident after a short period of time. Twenty-seven people were killed and 227 people were wounded.

Twenty-nine suspects were taken to court and after approximately ten sessions, most of them public, 15 were found guilty, with 7 to receive capital punishment (5 in absentia). Those include Adel Eidan, who drove the bomber to the mosque and admitted his intention to bomb the mosque and claimed that he wanted the mosque itself to be bombed, but "not the people", and Mohammed and Majid az-Zahrani (in absentia), who delivered the explosives to the terrorists in Kuwait and were arrested by Saudi authorities.

Three other Islamist attacks took place on the same day in France, Tunisia, and Somalia. The attacks followed an audio message released three days earlier by ISIS senior leader, Abu Mohammad al-Adnani, encouraging militants everywhere to attack the stated enemies of ISIS during the month of Ramadan. No definitive link between the attacks has yet been established. One attack, at a French factory, resulted in the beheading of one person; another, at a Tunisian beach resort, killed 38, most of them British tourists; and the other, an attack on an African Union base undertaken by al-Shabaab, killed at least 70.

== Background ==
The Imam Ja'far as-Sadiq Mosque is one of the oldest mosques in Kuwait, located in the Sawabir district in Sharq area, which is a part of the Capital Governorate. The mosque is attended mainly by Shia Muslim worshippers.

This attack was a part of the strategic terrorism of Islamic State of Iraq and the Levant, who consider Shia Islam to be heresy. In late May 2015, after the Qatif and Dammam mosque bombings, ISIL released a voice message calling on Muslims to clear the Arabian Peninsula of its Shia population.

== Bomb explosion ==
A suicide bomber attacked the mosque during Friday prayers in the Muslim holy month of Ramadan, factors that made the mosque more crowded than usual. At least eight people were immediately killed in the blast, which heavily damaged parts of the building. A witness said that the bomber entered the last row between the worshipers and detonated his device. Another witness, Parliament member Khalil al-Salih, who was in the mosque during the attack, said the same. He added "The explosion was really hard. The ceiling and wall got destroyed". He added that more than 2,000 people were praying there at that time.

=== Victims ===
Twenty-seven people were killed, consisting of 19 Kuwaitis, three Iranians, two Indians, one Saudi, one Pakistani and one Bedoon. Another 227 people were wounded in the attack, of whom 40 were still hospitalized on 28 June. Eight of the deceased victims were sent to Peace Valley cemetery, in the Shia holy city of Najaf, Iraq, by an official state plane.

=== Responsibility and investigation ===
The Islamic State of Iraq and the Levant identified the bomber as Abu Suleiman al-Muwahhid, and said in a statement posted on social media that he had targeted a "temple of the rejectionists" – a derogative term used towards Shias. By the following day, Kuwaiti authorities had arrested several people in connection with the attacks, including the driver of the car that took the bomber to the mosque, and the owner of the house he stayed in, which initial investigations showed that he is a supporter of "extremist and deviant ideology". The Ministry of Interior released a statement on its website two days after, identifying the perpetrator as Fahd Suleiman al-Qabba (born 1992), a Saudi citizen. The statement added that the terrorist arrived in the country on a commercial flight on the day of the attack. In his Instagram account, the arrested owner of the car, posted pictures of him giving lessons to kids in a mosque in the Sulaibiya area. His account was suspended in accordance with Instagram terms.

According to local newspapers, the perpetrators were told 20 days before to commit an operation that will "Shake Kuwait up", and let them choose the time and location. After picking the location, they contacted ISIL leaders about their plans via WhatsApp and e-mail, and checked the mosque for a two-week period. The source says that the explosives arrived at terrorist's house by partners from Saudi Arabia. Accordingly, the driver stopped at the parking lot of the mosque, along with suicide bomber at 11:00 am. Both of them waited until the mosque got crowded with worshipers. The suspected suicide bomber then went out holding a device, and when he opened his hand the bomb exploded. CCTV clip indicates that the suicide bomber walked into the mosque with his left hand crossed at his stomach. After the crime, the perpetrators were planning to escape Kuwait, but the rapid response of the Ministry of the Interior left them with no time to do so. The day of the attacks has been dubbed "Bloody Friday" by international media.

Two weeks later, Saudi authorities said that they had arrested three brothers suspected to be involved in the attack. On 14 July, the public prosecutor charged twenty-nine people involved in the attack – including the two Saudi brothers – and one still at large. The public prosecutor demanded the death penalty for eleven suspects.

The Kuwaiti Ministry of Labor and Social Affairs closed down the Fahd Al-Ahmed Charity which it accused of financing extremist groups in Syria linked to the bombing.

=== Trial ===
==== Criminal Court ====
Most sessions were public. Eleven suspects were released after the 6 August session, and the trial was deferred to the 10 August to assign new lawyers to those suspects without legal representatives. After the trial, the lawyer of the 9th and 11th suspects stepped down from defending the ninth suspect, as his testimony contradicted that of the eleventh. The lawyer of the 26th suspect also stepped down for "private reasons". The first suspect's lawyer also stepped down claiming the same reason. The first suspect's, Adel Eidan, the man who drove the bomber to the mosque and brought the explosives from the Saudi brothers near the Kuwaiti-Saudi border and gave shelter to the bomber after he arrived from Saudi Arabia, made the claim that he wanted to bomb the mosque without killing anyone. On the 15 August session, a lawyer was fined 100 KWD (~$330) for not showing up without an excuse, and another attorney was assigned for his clients. On the same session, one of the suspect's claim that he was tortured was refuted by the Forensic Medicine doctors. All session were public except the fourth session, and the suspects were able to see and contact their lawyers. Some females suspects were charged with hiding and destroying important evidence. For example, the twentieth suspect destroyed Fahd al-Qabba's (the bomber's) mobile phone. On 14 September 2015, the court ruled that 15 out of the 29 suspects had been found guilty, with seven receiving death sentences (five in absentia).

=== Appeals and Cassation Court ===
The Appeals court reduced the sentence of ISIS leader in Kuwait Fahad Muharib to 15 years in prison, and upheld Eidan's sentence. With this, Eidan is the only defendant to face execution. The cases of the five other defendants sentenced in absentia were not brought before the higher courts as their charges can only be challenged when they appear.

The Cassation Court upheld all of the Appeals Court's sentences.

On 27 July 2023, Eidan was executed by hanging at the Central Prison.

== Aftermath ==
The late Kuwaiti Emir Sheikh Sabah al-Sabah arrived at the crime scene minutes after the attack, as was the speaker of the Kuwaiti parliament, who called for an urgent meeting. The cabinet convened an emergency session later in the afternoon.

Several pictures were posted in social media and local newspapers showing men smeared with blood outside the mosque, a row of victims wrapped in white body bags, and the damage the mosque received. Calls for blood donations have been made. After receiving sufficient blood, the rest of the donors were told to come back after iftar – the meal eaten after sunset that marks the end of fasting. According to a Blood Bank supervisor, the bank received 1300 donors by the end of first day. The wounded were sent to more than five hospitals across the country.

Several private hospitals announced that they will treat any victim of the incident for free. Stuttgart Hospital in Germany announced that they will treat the victims for free. Some of the injured were sent there. The German Vivantes medical group sent medical staff to Kuwait.

=== Funeral ===
The condolence acceptance was held in Grand Mosque, the country's largest Sunni mosque on Saturday, 27 June. The Emir, Crown Prince, Prime Minister, former Prime Minister, other ministers, MPs, and high-ranked officials all attended. According to the Arab Times, thousands paid their respects.

At least 35,000 Kuwaitis, expatriates and mourners from the GCC countries attended the burial at Ja'fari Cemetery in Sulaibikhat. Paramedics were on site and helped those who fainted due to the hot temperature which reached 45 °C. Parliament Speaker Marzouq Al-Ghanim said at the funeral: "The unity of the people of our country is incredible [...] If you look around you will see Sunnis and Shias, Kuwaitis and non-Kuwaitis, all present to give their condolences to the families of the victims."

=== First anniversary, Mosque's restoration and Emir's visit ===
The patriotic spirit manifested by the people of Kuwait and their love, devotion and allegiance to their homeland would fend off all criminal and terrorist acts.

— Sabah Al-Sabah,

The Mosque was renovated and reopened about one year later in June 2016. The Emir of Kuwait, along with Sheikh Nasir al-Sabah, the former Prime Minister of Kuwait, and other members of the royal family visited the mosque and led a voluntary prayer there. Sheikh Nawwaf al-Sabah, the Crown Prince of Kuwait, was quoted praising national unity, adding "Kuwait's leaders, government and people are a single family that are united through both good and trying times." The Minister of Justice and Minister of Islamic Affairs Yaqoub al-Sane' was also present.

Relatives of the victims applauded the visit, saying it was a reflection of the national unity the terrorists were trying to undermine.

The Speaker of the Parliament at the time, Marzouq al-Ghanim, recalled the Emir's comment that "those are my children" after his security guards warned him about the dangers of going out in the open immediately after a terrorist attack.

=== Second anniversary ===
On the second anniversary of the attack, an exhibition was opened to document the attack.

=== Surveillance video ===
Three years after the incident, a surveillance footage showing the perpetrator walking inside the mosque and detonating himself, along with the immediate effects of the explosion was released.

=== Lawsuit against the Kuwaiti Government ===
After attacks targeting Shia in other parts of the Gulf region took place one month before the incident, and death threats against prominent Kuwaiti Shia scholars, such as Muhammad Baqir Al-Muhri, the Kuwaiti government promised to take "serious measures" to protect Shia Muslims. In the aftermath of the incident, a lawsuit accusing the Kuwaiti government of negligence was filed. While the appeals court ordered the government guilty and ordered it to reimburse the victims, the Supreme Court claims that the government is not guilty, stating that the government took "sufficient measures" and citing "compelling circumstances".

=== Execution of mastermind ===
On 27 July 2023, the stateless man involved in the logistics of the attack was executed by hanging. He was hanged alongside a group of other people.

== Response ==
=== Local ===
...Those are my sons

— Emir of Kuwait Sabah Al-Sabah,

Kuwait's Emir came to the location of the incident after a short period of time. He was warned that it was dangerous for him to get out, to which he replied "Those are my children". The Mosque's administration released a statement one day after the attack, condemning it and showing appreciation to the Emir for coming, and offering their condolences to the Emir, the Crown Prince, and the families of the martyrs. The Prime Minister, Sheikh Jaber al-Mubarak al-Sabah, visited the wounded and condemned the attack, saying, "This incident targets our internal front, our national unity. But this is too difficult for them and we are much stronger than that." The country's Minister of Justice and Islamic Affairs, Yaqoub Al-Sanea, called the attack "a terrorist and criminal act that threatens our security and targets our national unity". The Emir ordered re-construction of the mosque, although a few days before a Sunni business owner said his company is ready to do it for free.

=== International reactions ===
==== International organisations ====
- United Nations – United Nations Secretary-General Ban Ki-moon strongly condemned the three attacks on Kuwait, Tunisia and France. He added: "those responsible for these appalling acts of violence must be swiftly brought to justice". the UN Security Council, President of the UN General Assembly Sam Kutesa, and the UN High Representative of the Alliance of Civilizations Nassir Al-Nasir also condemned the attacks.
- European Union – High Representative / Vice President Federica Mogherini condemned the attack, saying that the bombing, together with the attacks that occurred in France and Tunisia the same day were "stark reminder that no country and no region can ignore the challenge posed by terrorists. They aim at destabilising our societies by spreading fear, suspicion, prejudice. Both Europe and the Arab world are targeted. Together we cry for our victims – and together we will stand against violence and sectarianism.

==== MENA States ====
- Bahrain – King Hamad al-Khalifa condemned the attack and expressed his condolences to the relatives of the victims. Opposition party, Al Wefaq National Islamic Society, also condemned the attacks. In a statement released on their website, they described the attack as "atrocious terror attack".
- Iran – Iranian President Hassan Rouhani condemned the attack and sent condolences to the Emir. Foreign Ministry spokeswoman Marzieh Afkham condemned the attacks.
- Iraq – Foreign Minister Sheikh Sabah al-Khalid al-Sabah received a phone call from his Iraqi counterpart condemning the attack.
  - Grand Ayatullah Ali al-Sistani condemned the attack, expanding deepest condolences to the families of the victims.
- Oman – The Ministry of Foreign Affairs denounced the attack and all forms of violence and terrorism against innocent worshipers.
- Saudi Arabia – Foreign Minister Sheikh Sabah al-Khalid al-Sabah received a phone call from his Saudi counterpart condemning the attack.
- United Arab Emirates – The UAE strongly condemned the attack on the mosque in Kuwait. UAE minister of foreign affairs Sheikh Abdullah bin Zayed Al Nahyan stressed the full support of UAE leadership and government to Kuwait.
- Egypt – President Abdelfatah al-Sisi condemned the attack in a phone call with the Kuwaiti Emir. The Foreign Minister also condemned the three separate attacks that occurred on the same day, calling them "vile".
- Lebanon – Prime Minister Tammam Salam strongly condemned the attack as a heinous plot against the national unity of Kuwait. A press release from his office read: "The attack against a mosque in the holy month of Ramadan adds a new example of the extent of barbarism of saboteurs and the seriousness of their destructive acts in our Arab region." The Lebanese Islamic Resistance (Hizbullah) Leader Hassan Nasrallah denounced the attacks on mosques in a video, and added that Kuwait's and Kuwaitis' reaction to the bombing as an Emir, Government, National Assembly (Parliament), political powers, Sunni and Shia scholars and ordinary people was a marvelous model, and he gave a salute to Kuwait. He then compared the situation with Bahrain's, when the government tried to "benefit" from the threats.
- Jordan – State Minister for Media Affairs Muhammad al-Momani condemned the attack.
- Libya – The Foreign Ministry of the disputed government describing it as a "plan to plant sectarian sedition and deal a blow to national unity. This act stems from a veiled intention to implant sectarian sedition and strike the national unity between Sunnis and Shiites in Kuwait."
- Sudan – The Foreign Ministry said of the attack that it targeted unarmed worshipers and targeted the stability and security of the Kuwaiti society.

==== Others ====
- Bosnia – The Bosnian-Kuwaiti parliamentary friendship group said the attack targeted not only Kuwaiti worshipers but all Muslims and peace loving people around the world.
- Canada – Prime Minister Stephen Harper condemned the "heinous terrorist attacks" that day and offered his deepest condolences. "...We will continue to protect Canadians, support the international coalition to degrade the jihadist threat, and stand shoulder to shoulder with our allies in defiance of this evil," said Harper in a statement posted on the Canadian government website.
- India – President of India Pranab Mukherjee sent a letter to the Emir expressing condolences. Prime Minister Narendra Modi condemned the attacks in France, Tunisia, and Kuwait, saying the progress of humanity lies in peace and brotherhood instead of hatred and mindless violence.
- Philippines – The Department of Foreign Affairs the attacks in Kuwait along with attacks in Tunisia, and France. The foreign affairs body also urged the international community to continue the global campaign against terrorism saying that "Extremism and terrorism have no place in a civilized society. They also run counter to the desire of people all around the world for peace, harmony and understanding, and to global efforts to promote development and prosperity". Condolences to the families and relatives of the victims of the attack were also extended.
- Russia – President Vladimir Putin expressed condolences to Kuwait. "The Russian head of state has strongly denounced terrorism in all of its manifestations and voiced support for the Kuwaiti leadership's and people's efforts to fight this threat," the statement read.
- Singapore – The Ministry of Foreign affairs condemned the attacks and reiterated the country's strong opposition of terrorism. "Singapore strongly condemns the acts of violence and the loss of innocent lives in the three terrorist attacks that occurred on 26 June 2015 in Sousse, Tunisia, Kuwait City, Kuwait, and Saint-Quentin-Fallavier, France. We extend our deepest condolences to the families of the victims on their tragic loss. These brutal acts of terror are another reminder that we need to remain vigilant and work closely with our international partners to combat terrorism and counter violent extremism"
- Malaysia – Prime Minister Najib Razak condemn the attack and offered his condolences. On his statement in Facebook, he said "In the strongest terms, I condemn the heinous acts of terrorism on innocent civilians in France, Tunisia and Kuwait". "These atrocities, which have caused injuries and claimed the lives of many in this holy month of Ramadan, are against the true teachings of Islam. My deepest condolences and Al-Fatihah".
- Pakistan – The Foreign Office strongly condemned the attack. "The people and the Government of Pakistan wish to convey their heartfelt sympathies and deepest condolences to the bereaved families and pray for speedy recovery of the injured. [...] We share the grief of the brotherly people of the State of Kuwait over this cowardly attack against innocent civilians praying at a mosque during the Holy month of Ramadan."
- United Kingdom – British Prime Minister David Cameron described the terrorist attacks as "savage" and "a brutal and tragic reminder of the threat faced around the world from these evil terrorists"
- Vietnam – President Trương Tấn Sang sent a message of condolence to Kuwait's emir Sabah Al-Ahmad Al-Jaber Al-Sabah over the great loss of life caused by the terror attack. While Deputy Spokesperson of the Foreign Ministry Pham Thu Hang expressed her deep concern and strongly protests the terrorist attacks in France, Tunisia and Kuwait. In a statement, she said "These are savage and inhumane actions targeting innocent civilians. We share the irreparable losses and heartbreak with the Governments, peoples and families of victims". She also stressed that Vietnam believes those instigators must bear the responsibility for their actions and receive strict punishment.

== See also ==
- Kuwait and state-sponsored terrorism
- 26 June 2015 Islamist attacks
- List of terrorist incidents, 2015
- Terrorism in Kuwait
