= 2015 Khan Bani Saad bombing =

Terrorist suicide bombing in Diyala, Iraq

- Part of Iraqi Civil War
- Location: 33°34′16″N 44°32′31″E; Khan Bani Saad, Diyala Governorate, Iraq
- Date: 17 July 2015
- Target: Shiites
- Attack type: Mass murder, car bomb, suicide attack
- Weapon: Car bomb
- Deaths: 120–130
- Injuries: at least 130
- Perpetrator: Islamic State

A suicide car bombing occurred on 17 July 2015 in the Iraqi city of Khan Bani Saad, targeting a local marketplace. As of 19 July 2015 approximately 130 people were killed in the bombing, with a similar number of injured. Several people were killed by collapsed buildings. The bomb was hidden under an ice truck in an attempt to attract more people amid the heat. Responsibility for the attack was claimed by the Islamic State (IS).

== Background ==
Prior to the attack, Iraqi officials had declared victory over IS in the Diyala Governorate where Khan Bani Saad is located after local forces and Shiite paramilitaries drove the IS members out of towns and villages. Insurgents, however, remained active in the governorate.

== Bombing ==
According to two local police officials, the bomber announced he was selling ice and offering a discount because of the Eid al-Fitr holiday. As the air temperature was around 35 °C (95 °F), the announcement attracted people to his ice truck. The attacker then detonated a bomb, killing himself and between 120 and 130 people and injuring at least 130 more. Fifteen children were among the dead. Responsibility for the attack was claimed by the IS, which in a Twitter statement wrote that the attack had been conducted in response to the killing of Sunni Muslims in Hawija, and that 3 tonnes (6,600 pounds) of explosives had been used in the attack.

== Aftermath ==
In addition to those killed, 20 people were reported missing after the attack. Several buildings collapsed after the blast, crushing some people. Police major Ahmed al-Tamimi assessed the damage as "devastating". The authorities of Diyala Governorate, where Khan Bani Saad is located, declared three days of mourning and cancelled Eid al-Fitr festivities.

== Reactions ==
- Iraq – Iraqi Speaker of the Parliament Salim al-Jabouri said the attack "struck an 'ugly sectarian chord'."
- United States – In a July 18 statement, White House National Security Council spokesman Ned Price called the attack in Iraq's eastern Diyala Province "abhorrent" and denounced the IS group, also known as ISIL, for having "purposefully and viciously targeted Iraqi civilians". He also added, "This latest attack is yet another painful example of the atrocities that the terrorist group ISIL continues to perpetrate against the people of Iraq."
- United Kingdom – Foreign Office Minister of State, Tobias Ellwood said: "I am appalled by the attack in Khan Bani Saad in Iraq’s Diyala province, which killed over 115 people and injured many more, including women and children. Carrying out such an attack during Eid Al-Fitr celebrations, when families and friends were gathered to mark the end of the holy month of Ramadan, is a heinous act. My thoughts and sympathies are with everyone affected." He also added: "The so-called Islamic State of Iraq and the Levant (ISIL) is a brutal terrorist organisation which has carried out horrific atrocities in Iraq. The UK remains committed to working with the Government of Iraq and the global coalition to defeat ISIL."
- United Nations – On July 18, UN Secretary-General Ban Ki-moon called the attack "heinous and devastating."

== See also ==
- Timeline of the Iraq War (2015)
- List of terrorist incidents linked to the Islamic State
- List of terrorist incidents, 2015
