= 2015 Arar attack =

Terrorist incident in Saudi Arabia

2015 Saudi Arabia attack
- Part of War in Iraq (2013-2017)
- Location of Northern Borders Region, Saudi Arabia
- Location: Arar, Northern Borders Region, Saudi Arabia
- Date: 5 January 2015
- Attack type: Suicide bombing
- Deaths: 5 killed (including the two perpetrators)
- Injuries: 1
- Perpetrator: Islamic State

On 5 January 2015, two men, one strapped with a suicide vest, ambushed a border guard patrol in Arar, Saudi Arabia along the border of Iraq, killing three guards and injuring another. The guards were able to return fire and kill one of the terrorists and afterwards the suicide bomber detonated his vest.

The commander of the patrol Brigadier General Awda Muawad Al-Balawi along with two other soldiers Private Tariq Muhammad Halawi and Corporal Yahya Ahmed Najimi were killed while Corporal Salem Ta’isan Al-Anzi was injured.

== See also ==
- 2014 al-Dalwah attack
- List of terrorist incidents, 2015
