= Al-Suwaidi (Riyadh) =

Neighbourhood in Riyadh, Saudi Arabia

Coordinates: 24.59°N 46.67°E

Al-Suwaidi حي السويدي
- Neighbourhood
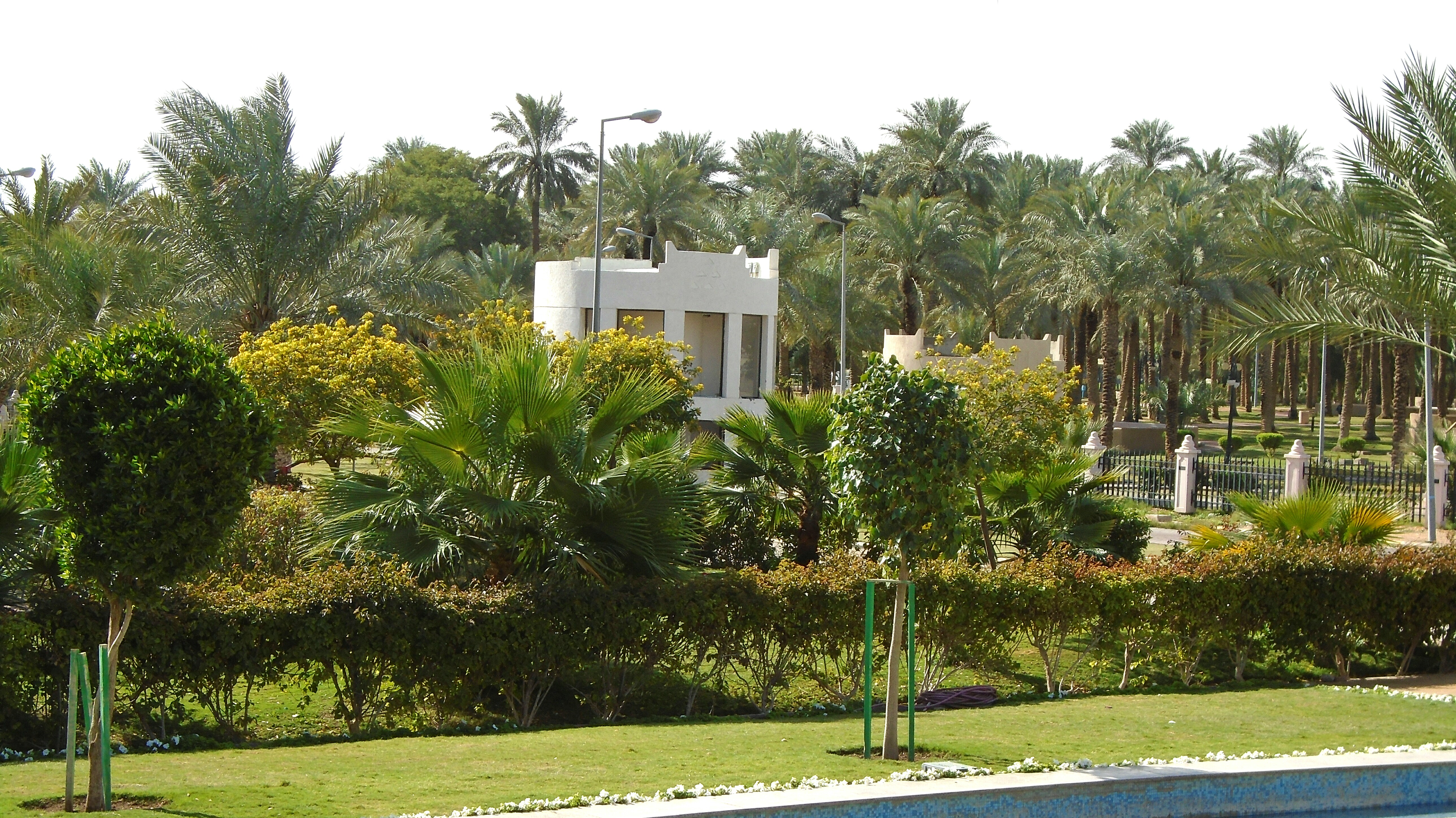
- Al Suwaidi Park

- Location within Saudi Arabia Location within Asia
- Country: Saudi Arabia
- City: Riyadh

Government
  - Body: Baladiyah Al Urayja

Language
  - Official: Arabic

Al-Suwaidi (Arabic: السويدي, lit. 'bitter soil') is a residential neighbourhood and a subject of Baladiyah al-Urayja located on the right bank of Wadi Hanifa in southwestern Riyadh, Saudi Arabia. It is one of the city's 'residential districts' and is relatively overpopulated in terms of the standards of Riyadh.

== Demographics ==
As of 2005, more than 500,000 people lived in the area. As of that year, many middle-income Saudis lived in Al-Suwaidi. Many people migrating from the rural areas went to Al-Suwaidi during the "oil boom" in the 1970s and early 1980s. Shaker Abu Taleb and Asharq Al-Awsat of the Arab News said in 2005 that the community "was originally beyond the capital's congestion; that is, however, no longer the case." Bradley said that Al-Suwaidi has a reputation "for being a bastion of strict Wahhabism" within the people living in Saudi Arabia. Bradley added that the men "hardly need incitement" to contrast their own lives with wealthy Saudi princes and foreigners.

== Association with terrorism ==
The district gained notoriety in 2003 when a 26-man list of "most wanted terrorists" published by the Saudi government contained 15 men who were said to have links with the neighbourhood. More than half of those suspects were graduates of Imam Muhammad ibn Saud Islamic University. Shaker Abu Taleb and Asharq Al-Awsat of the Arab News said that many Saudis compared Al-Suwaidi to Fallujah, Iraq, a site of fighting during the Iraq War.

== In popular culture ==
The district and its involvement in terrorist activities have featured in multiple works, e.g.:

- The Kingdom (2007), starring Jamie Foxx
- Traitor (2008), starring Don Cheadle
