= Campina =

Campina can refer to:

- Câmpina, a Romanian city.
- Campina, a Dutch dairy company merged with Royal Friesland foods. The name of the new company is FrieslandCampina.
- Campina GmbH, a German subsidiary of the Dutch dairy cooperative FrieslandCampina
- Campina (biome), natural or artificial meadows in Brazil
- Campinarana, open shrubland and savanna in the north of Brazil and in Colombia and Venezuela
- Campina (ice cream), an ice cream products company in Indonesia

== See also ==
- Campinas, a city and county located in the state of São Paulo, Brazil.
- Campino (disambiguation)
