= Longevity Brand =

Brand of canned condensed milk

Exterior of a can of Sữa Ông Thọ

Longevity Brand (Vietnamese: Sữa Ông Thọ, lit. translated as "Mr. Longevity's milk") is a brand of canned condensed milk, registered by FrieslandCampina and distributed by Sun Hing Foods, Inc. in the United States and Canada. It is a popular ingredient in Vietnamese iced coffee with milk (cà phê sữa đá) drinks, and in various other Vietnamese desserts. The brand is now owned by Vinamilk.

== History ==
Sữa Ông Thọ was mass-produced in the Saigon–Biên Hòa area and widely consumed in the Republic of Vietnam, produced by Friesland Foods (now FrieslandCampina) prior 1975. It was used in coffee, mixed with hot water to produce hot milk for babies and young children to drink (since fresh milk had to be imported and was thus expensive), and used for dipping French bread (bánh mì) and in other dessert applications.

== Name ==
The name Ông Thọ is the Vietnamese term for the personified astrology deity of Longevity (Thọ), representing long life. He, with Good Fortune (Phước) and Prosperity (Lộc), form a trio of astrological deities in the Taoist concept of Phước Lộc Thọ.

== Nationalisation ==
After the 1975 Fall of Saigon, the factories manufacturing Sữa Ông Thọ, along with all other commercial and private properties, were collectivized by the communists, and the facilities came under the state company Vinamilk, who continued to produce Sữa Ông Thọ condensed milk under the same name used domestically and elsewhere in Indochina.

Friesland Foods continued production of Sữa Ông Thọ - Longevity Brand after 1975 in the U.S. and Canada for the North American market, especially catering to Overseas Vietnamese consumers, and increasingly to Western consumers as the popularity of Vietnamese coffee and cuisine in general, increases. In North America, Longevity Brand - Sữa Ông Thọ is widely available in Asian supermarkets, and increasingly in conventional supermarkets. Friesland sued Vinamilk for use of the brand in the US in 2002. Sun Hing Foods, Inc., in Northern California, is the sole distributor for Longevity Brand in Canada and the United States.

== Gallery ==
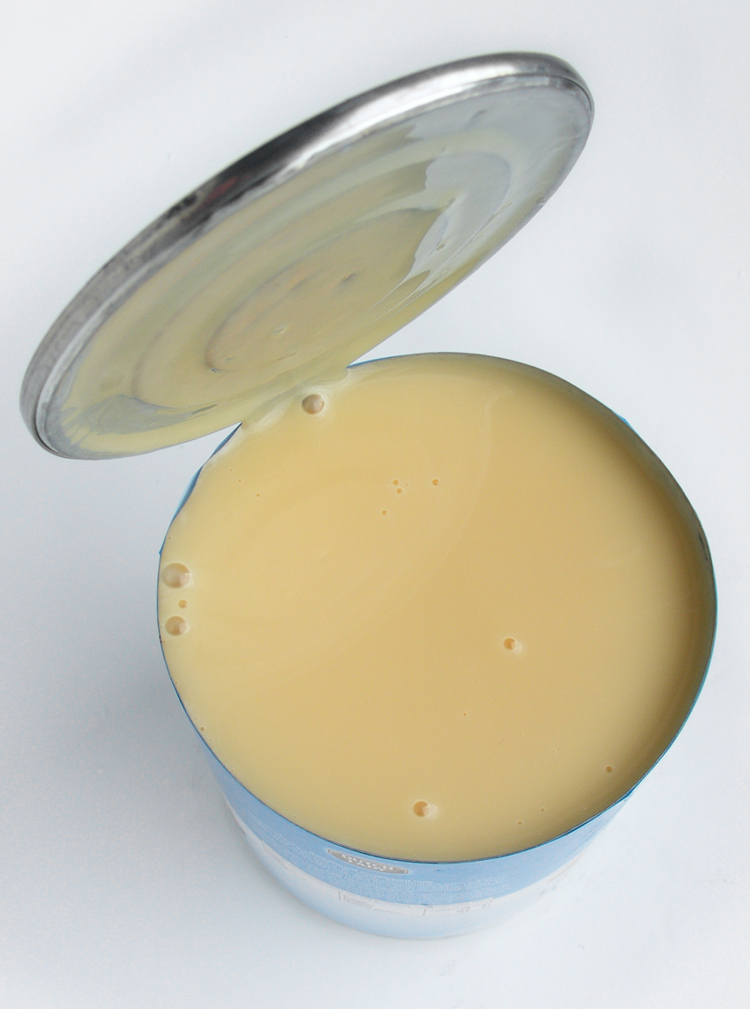
Appearance of typical condensed milk

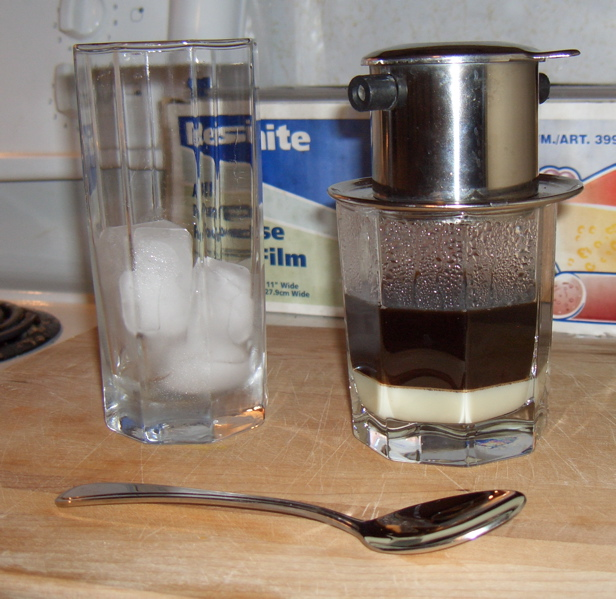
Cà phê sữa đá

== See also ==
- Vietnamese iced coffee
- Vietnamese cuisine
- Coffee
- Baked milk
- Evaporated milk
- Canned food
- Powdered milk
- Scalded milk
- Nutella
