= Campinho =

Campinho may refer to:

- Jorge Fernando Barroso Maciel or Campinho (born 1986), Portuguese footballer
- Campinho (Rio de Janeiro), a neighborhood in the North Zone of Rio de Janeiro, Brazil
- Campinhos State Park in the state of Paraná, Brazil

== See also ==
- Campino (disambiguation)
