= Dutch Lady Milk Industries =

Brand of milk product

Dutch Lady Milk Industries Berhad
- Company type: Public limited company
- Traded as: MYX: 3026
- Industry: Cow milk Dairy product
- Founded: 28 May 1963; 63 years ago in Petaling Jaya, Selangor, Malaysia
- Headquarters: Level 5, Quill 9, 112, Jalan Semangat, 46300, Petaling Jaya, Malaysia
- Area served: Brunei; Hong Kong; Japan; Malaysia; Philippines; Singapore; Vietnam
- Parent: FrieslandCampina
- Website: www.dutchlady.com.my

Dutch Lady Milk Industries Berhad (doing business as Dutch Lady Malaysia (Malaysia and Brunei), Dutch Lady Hong Kong (Hong Kong), Dutch Lady Singapore (Singapore), Dutch Lady Philippines (Philippines), Dutch Lady Japan (Japan) and Dutch Lady Vietnam (Vietnam, Vietnamese: Cô Gái Hà Lan)) (MYX: 3026) is a manufacturer of cow milk and dairy products in Malaysia, Singapore, Hong Kong, Brunei, Philippines, Japan and Vietnam since the 1960s. It was previously under Royal FrieslandFoods, a Netherlands-based multinational co-operative. Dutch Lady Malaysia is currently a subsidiary of FrieslandCampina, which was formed in December 2008 as a result of the merger between FrieslandFoods and Campina. Its current products include growing up milk, UHT milk, pasteurised milk, sterilised milk, family powdered milk, low fat and 0% fat drinking yoghurt, and low fat yoghurt.

== History ==
The company started as Pacific Milk Industries (Malaya) Sdn Bhd on 28 May 1963 where it was commissioned to produce sweetened condensed milk in its factory in Petaling Jaya, becoming FrieslandFoods’ first production facility outside the Netherlands. It was incorporated as a private joint-stock limited company and started with the production of only condensed milk, before expanding into dairy products. Prior to the expansion, many of its products began to be distributed to surrounding countries in Asia and Oceania.

On 24 September 1968, the company became the first milk company to be listed on the countries Stock Exchanges of Kuala Lumpur and Singapore; and by 1975, changing its name to Dutch Baby Milk Industries (Malaya) Berhad. Following the company modernisation, it changed its name to Dutch Lady Milk Industries Berhad in 2000 and have been using the ultra-high-temperature processing (UHT) and packaging technology since 1970s to produce milk in the country.

The company continued to progressively manufacture and introduce new products into the Malaysian market – sterilised milk were locally produced and sold in plastic bottles in 1983, production of chilled milk products started in 1986, and fruit yoghurt and growing up milk were introduced into the market in 1988. In 2011, Dutch Lady Malaysia was reported as the market share leader in the growing up milk segment – with the Dutch Lady brand holding 40% of national market share.

Its financial record for first quarter of 2012 showed a 9% increase in revenue year-on-year, with a net profit of RM27.5 million (US$8.72 million). Despite a slowdown in the Malaysian dairy industry, Dutch Lady Malaysia was reported to be on track to achieve its RM1 billion sales target for 2013.
