= PP-1 Attock-I =

Constituency of the Punjabi Provincial Legislature, Pakistan

- Constituency for the Provincial Assembly of Punjab
- Region: Hazro Tehsil and Kamra Cantt of Attock District

Current constituency
- Party: TBD
- Member: Vacant
- Created from: PP-16 Attock-II

PP-1 Attock-I (پی پی-1، اٹک-1) is a Constituency of Provincial Assembly of Punjab.

== Members of Assembly ==
=== 1970-1977: PP-9 Campbellpur-I ===
Election	Member	Party
1970	Taj Muhammad Khanzada	CML

=== 1977-1985: PP-12 Campbellpur-I ===
Election	Member	Party
1977	Malik Hakmeem Khan	PPP

=== 1985-2002: PP-12 Attock-I ===
Election	Member	Party
1985	Aftab Ahmed Sheikh	Non-Partisan
1988	Malik Hakmeem Khan	PPP
1990	Sardar Muhammad Sadiq Khan	IJI
1993	Mst Musarrat Sultan	PML(N)
1997	Tahir Sadiq	PML(N)

=== 2002-2018: PP-16 Attock-II ===
Election	Member	Party
2002	Aftab Ahmed Sheikh	PML(Q)
2008	Shuja Khanzada	PML(N)
2013	Shuja Khanzada	PML(N)
2015 †	Jahangir Khanzada	PML(N)

=== 2018-2023: PP-2 Attock-II ===
Election	Member	Party
2018	Jahangir Khanzada	PML(N)

=== 2024-Present: PP-1 Attock-I ===
Election	Member	Party
2024	TBD	TBD

† By-elections.

== Election results ==
=== 2024 Elections ===
Provincial election 2024: PP-1 Attock-I
Party	Candidate	Votes	%	±%
PTI	Qazi Ahmed Akbar (Note: Filed nomination papers as PTI candidate but ECP allowed him to run as an Independent)	49,285	39.84	
PML(N)	Jahangir Khanzada	36,477	29.49	
TLP	Mukhtiar Khan	12,350	9.98	
Independent	Changaiz Khan	9,037	7.31	
JUI (F)	Muhammad Ibrahim	4,538	3.67	
PRHP	Muhavia Ali	3,936	3.18	
Independent	Taimoor Shehzad	3,196	2.58	
JI	Hafiz Jabir Ali Khan	2,278	1.84	
Others	Others (eight candidates)	2,603	2.11	
Turnout		127,907	43.59	
Total valid votes		123,700	96.71	
Rejected ballots		4,207	3.29	
Majority		12,808	10.35	
Registered electors		293,444		
hold				

=== 2018 Elections ===
Jahangir Khanzada of PML(N) won the seat by getting 46,002 votes.

Provincial election 2018: PP-2 Attock-II
Party	Candidate	Votes	%	±%
PML(N)	Jahangir Khanzada	46,002	38.38	▼52.30
PTI	Qazi Ahmad Akbar Khan	42,922	35.81	▲35.81
MMA	Changaiz Khan	17,302	14.43	▲14.43
TLP	Syed Tahir Ali Shah	9,745	8.13	New
PPP	Ahmed Khanzada	2,961	2.47	▲2.47
Independent	Liaqat Mehmood	526	0.44	N/A
PJDP	Shoukat Hayat	412	0.34	New
Majority		3,080	2.57	▼78.79
Valid ballots		1,19,870	96.80	
Rejected ballots		3,959	3.20	
Turnout		123,829	49.79	▲28.12
Registered electors		2,48,696		
PML(N) hold				

=== 2015 By-Elections ===
By elections were held after assassination of Shuja Khanzada.Jahangir Khanzada of PML(N) won the seat by getting 39,820 votes.

2015 By election: PP-16 Attock-II
Party	Candidate	Votes	%	±%
PML(N)	Jahangir Khanzada	39,820	90.68	▲50.21
Independent	Dr Muhammad Naeem Awan	4,094	9.32	N/A
Majority		35,726	81.36	▲67.94
Valid ballots		43,914	98.34	
Rejected ballots		742	1.66	
Turnout		44,656	21.67	▼28.26
Registered electors		2,06,669		
PML(N) hold				

=== 2013 Elections ===
Shuja Khanzada of PML(N) won the seat by getting 38,971 votes.

Provincial election 2013: PP-16 Attock-II
Party	Candidate	Votes	%	±%
PML(N)	Shuja Khanzada	38,791	40.47	▲24.40
Independent	Raza Khan	25,931	27.05	N/A
PTI	Qazi Ahmad Akbar Khan	18,549	19.35	▲19.35
JUI (F)	Qazi Attique ur Rehman	5,392	5.63	▲5.63
JI	Hafiz Jabbar Ali Khan	1,768	1.84	▲1.84
PPP	Dr Muhammad Nadeem Awan	990	1.03	▼18.26
Independent	Qari Muhammad Luqman	294	0.31	N/A
PST	Khalid Mehmood Awan	247	0.26	▲0.26
Jamiat Ulema-e-Pakistan	Khalid Mehmood Awan	203	0.21	▲0.21
Independent	Muhammad Nouman	182	0.19	N/A
Pakistan Human Rights Party	Khalid Mehmood Awan	66	0.07	▲0.07
Majority		12,860	13.42	▼2.10
Valid ballots		92,413	98.34	
Rejected ballots		3,434	1.66	
Turnout		95,847	49.94	▲1.72
Registered electors		1,91,928		
PML(N) gain from Independent				

=== 2008 Elections ===
Shuja Khanzada as Independent candidate won the seat by getting 25,313 votes. He late joined PML(N).

Provincial election 2002: PP-16 Attock-II
Party	Candidate	Votes	%	±%
Independent	Shuja Khanzada	25,313	36.56	N/A
PPP	Dr Muhammad Naeem Awan	14,027	20.26	▲13.91
MMA	Qari Attiq-ur-Rehman	12,298	17.76	▼9.40
PML(N)	Fazal ur Rehman	11,689	16.88	▲0.87
TI	Aftab Khan Wardag	4,453	6.43	▲0.95
Independent	Qari Muhammad Ismail	1,175	1.70	N/A
Independent	Zubair Khan	282	0.41	N/A
Majority		11,286	16.30	▲8.39
Valid ballots		69,237	96.23	
Rejected ballots		3,479	3.77	
Turnout		72,716	48.22	▲6.97
Registered electors		1,50,810		
Independent gain from PML(Q)				

=== 2002 Elections ===
Shuja Khanzada of PML(Q) won the seat by getting 19,513 votes.

Provincial election 2002: PP-16 Attock-II
Party	Candidate	Votes	%	±%
PML(Q)	Shuja Khanzada	19,513	35.07	▲35.07
MMA	Qari Attiq-ur-Rehman	15,110	27.16	▲27.16
PML(N)	Shakukat Zaman	8,909	16.01	▼36.84
PPP	Dr Muhammad Naeem Awan	3,535	6.35	▼15.32
TI	Aftab Khan Wardag	3,050	5.48	New
PAT	Syed Hassan Naveed Haider	2,297	4.13	▲4.13
Independent	Malik Muhammad Asghar Khan	569	1.02	N/A
National Alliance	Zamurad Khan Advocate	560	1.01	New
Majority		4,403	7.91	▲14.06
Valid ballots		53,543	96.23	
Rejected ballots		2,096	3.77	
Turnout		55,639	41.25	▼6.35
Registered electors		1,34,873		
PML(Q) gain from PML(N)				

=== 1997 Elections ===
Tahir Sadiq Khan of PML(N) won the seat by getting 36,051 votes.

Provincial election 1997: PP-12 Attock-I
Party	Candidate	Votes	%	±%
PML(N)	Tahir Sadiq Khan	36,051	52.85	▲6.39
Independent	Muhammad Shahwaiz Khan	15,147	22.20	N/A
PPP	Hakmeen Khan	14,785	21.67	▼8.20
PTI	Syed Hassan Naveed Haider	1,289	1.89	New
Independent	Malik Muhammad Asghar Khan	418	0.61	N/A
Independent	Waqas Ijaz Siddiq	407	0.60	N/A
Jamiat Ulema-e-Pakistan	Muhammad Iftikhar Ahmad Khawaja	123	0.18	▲0.18
Majority		20,904	30.65	▲14.06
Valid ballots		68,220	96.93	
Rejected ballots		2,159	3.07	
Turnout		70,379	47.60	▼9.02
Registered electors		1,47,859		
PML(N) hold				

=== 1993 Elections ===
Mst Musarrat Sultan of PML(N) won the seat by getting 37,085 votes.

Provincial election 1993: PP-12 Attock-I
Party	Candidate	Votes	%	±%
PML(N)	Mst Musarrat Sultan	37,085	46.46	▼17.53
PPP	Hakmeen Khan	23,840	29.87	▼0.21
Independent	Syed Ijaz Hussain Bukhari	12,629	15.82	N/A
Pakistan Islamic Front	Sheikh Muhammad Ijaz Siddiqui	3,507	4.39	▲4.39
Independent	Amir Afzal Khan	2,331	2.92	N/A
Islamic Jamhoori Mahaz	Muhammad Iftikhar Khan	431	0.54	▲0.54
Majority		13,245	16.59	▼17.32
Valid ballots		79,823	99.00	
Rejected ballots		809	1.00	
Turnout		80,632	56.62	▲3.17
Registered electors		1,42,414		
PML(N) hold				

=== 1990 Elections ===
Sardar Muhammad Sadiq Khan of IJI won the seat by getting 45,349 votes.

Provincial election 1990: PP-12 Attock-I
Party	Candidate	Votes	%	±%
IJI	Sardar Muhammad Sadiq Khan	45,349	63.99	▲61.79
PPP	Hakmeen Khan	21,319	30.08	▼19.51
Independent	Mumtaz Arshad	2,763	3.90	N/A
Jamiat Ulema-e-Pakistan	Tahir Ehsan	1,082	1.53	▲1.53
PAT	Muhammad Nouman	352	0.50	▲0.50
Majority		24,030	33.91	▲26.74
Valid ballots		70,865	99.22	
Rejected ballots		555	0.78	
Turnout		71,420	53.45	▼1.72
Registered electors		1,33,610		
IJI gain from PPP				

=== 1988 Elections ===
Malik Hakmeem Khan of PPP won the seat by getting 36,134 votes.

Provincial election 1988: PP-12 Attock-I
Party	Candidate	Votes	%	±%
PPP	Malik Hakmeem Khan	36,134	49.59	▲49.59
Pakistan Awami Ittehad	Sardar Muhammad Shafiq Khan	32,369	44.42	▲44.42
IJI	Sheikh Muhammad Ijaz	1,602	2.20	▲2.20
Independent	5 Candidates	2,765	13.06	
Majority		3,765	7.17	▼1.86
Valid ballots		72,870	99.01	
Rejected ballots		731	0.99	▼0.92
Turnout		73,601	55.17	N/A
Registered electors		1,33,397		
PPP gain from Nonpartisan				

=== 1985 Elections ===
Aftab Ahmad Sheikh won the seat by getting 20,947 votes.

Provincial election 1985: PP-12 Attock-I
Party	Candidate	Votes	%	±%
Nonpartisan	Aftab Ahmad Sheikh	20,947	36.92	
Nonpartisan	Shabir Ahmad Khan	15,823	27.89	
Nonpartisan	4 Candidates	19,973	35.20	
Majority		5,124	9.03	▼43.87
Valid ballots		56,743	98.07	
Rejected ballots		1,119	1.93	▲0.66
Turnout		57,862	62.99	N/A
Registered electors		91,861		
Nonpartisan gain from PPP				

=== 1977 Elections ===
Malik Hakmeem Khan of PPP won the seat by getting 24,637 votes.

Provincial election 1977: PP-12 Campbellpur-I
Party	Candidate	Votes	%	±%
PPP	Malik Hakmeem Khan	24,637	69.92	▲30.60
N/A	Allah Baksh Khan	5,996	17.02	
N/A	5 Candidates	4,604	13.06	
Majority		18,641	52.90	▲51.93
Valid ballots		35,237	98.73	
Rejected ballots		452	1.27	▼0.11
Turnout		35,689	N/A	N/A
Registered electors		N/A		
PPP gain from CML				

=== 1970 Elections ===
Taj Muhammad Khanzada of CML won the seat by getting 12,853 votes.

Provincial election 1970: PP-9 Campbellpur-I
Party	Candidate	Votes	%
CML	Taj Muhammad Khanzada	12,853	40.29
PPP	Aurangzeb Qazi	12,546	39.32
Jamiat Ulema-e-Islam	Saeed-ur-Rehman	6,009	18.83
Independent	Faqir Khan	345	1.08
JI	M Aslam Khan Malik	152	0.48
Majority		307	0.97
Valid ballots		31,905	98.62
Rejected ballots		446	1.38
Turnout		32,351	49.85
Registered electors		64,898	
CML win (new seat)			

== See also ==
- PP-297 Rajanpur-VI
- PP-2 Attock-II
