= Jahangir Khanzada =

Pakistani politician

Member of the Provincial Assembly of the Punjab
- In office 15 August 2018 – 14 January 2023
- Constituency: PP-2 Attock-II
- In office October 2015 – 31 May 2018
- Constituency: PP-16 (Attock-II)

Personal details
- Born: 8 July 1977 (age 49) Attock, Punjab, Pakistan
- Party: PMLN
- Parent: Shuja Khanzada (father)

Jahangir Khanzada is a Pakistani politician who had been a Member of the Provincial Assembly of the Punjab from August 2018 to January 2023. Previously he was a member of the Punjab Assembly from October 2015 to May 2018.

== Early life and education ==
He was born on 8 July 1977 in Peshawar to Shuja Khanzada.

He has the degree of the Master of Business Administration in Marketing which he received in 2000 from Preston University, Islamabad.

He holds British citizenship.

== Political career ==
He was elected to the Provincial Assembly of the Punjab as a candidate of Pakistan Muslim League (N) (PML-N) from Constituency PP-16 (Attock-II) in a by-election held in October 2015. In November 2016, he was inducted into the provincial cabinet of Chief Minister Shehbaz Sharif and was made Provincial Minister of Punjab for Youth Affairs and Sports.

He was re-elected to Provincial Assembly of the Punjab as a candidate of PML-N from Constituency PP-2 (Attock-II) in the 2018 Pakistani general election.
