= Lahore canal =

Canal that runs through Lahore, Punjab, Pakistan

Nahr نہر
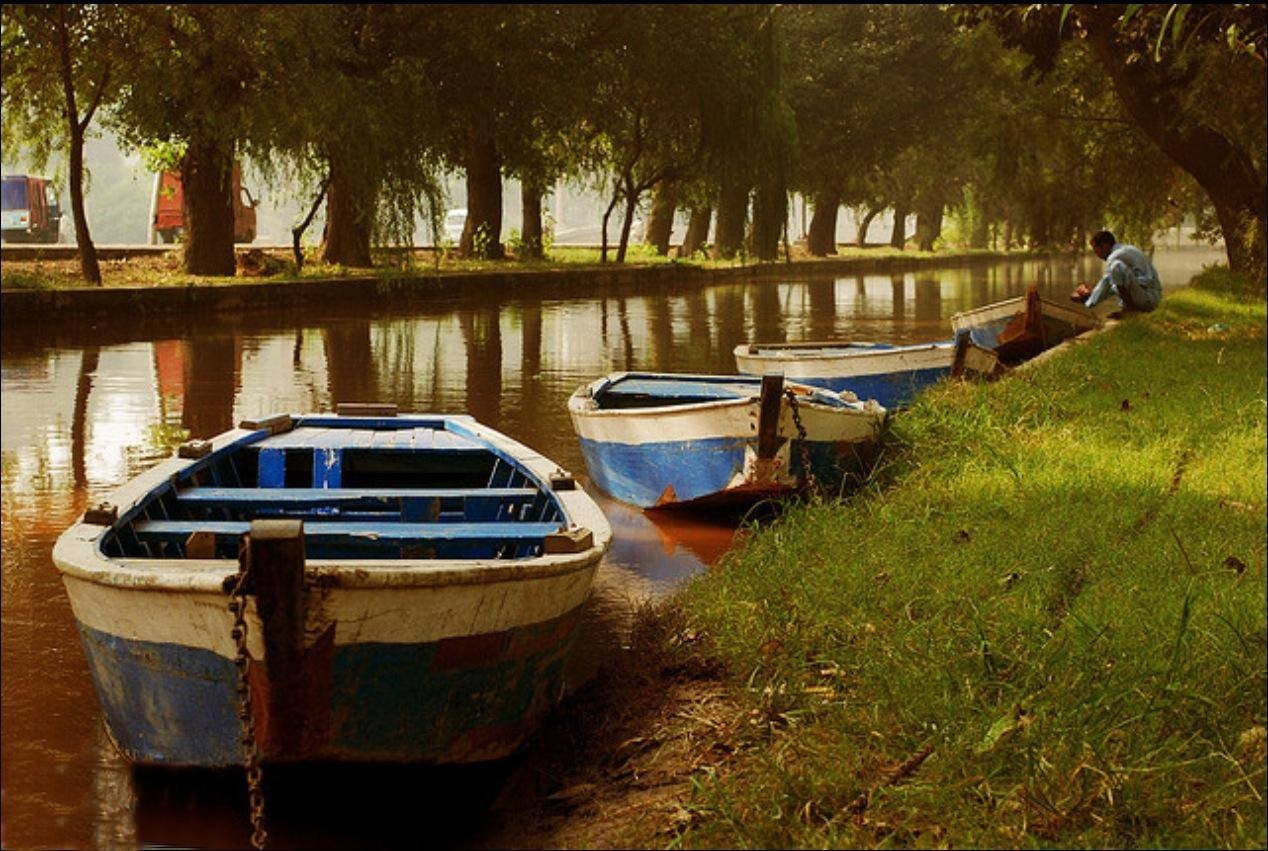
- A view of the Nahr taken opposite from the Punjab University.
- Interactive map of Nahr نہر

Specifications
- Length: 51 miles (82 km)
- Status: Open

History
- Construction began: 1863

Geography
- Start point: BRB canal, few yards away from the Khaira Village
- End point: Raiwind Road
- Branch of: Bambawali Ravi-Bedian (BRB) Canal

The Nahr (Urdu/Punjabi: نہر) is a canal that runs through the east of the city of Lahore, Punjab in Pakistan. It diverges from the Bambawali-Ravi-Bedian (BRB) Canal. This 37 miles (60 km) long waterway was initially built by the Mughals. It was then upgraded by the British in 1861. It is an important part of the city's cultural heritage.

The Nahr is managed by the Lahore Zone of the Punjab Irrigation Department. The Nahr, aside from its importance for irrigation, forms the centre of a unique linear park that serves as one of the longest public green belts and popular recreational destination spots in the area. The average depth of the Nahr is 5 feet (1.5 m). The Canal Bank Road runs along the banks of the Nahr. On local and national festivals, the banks of the Nahr are illuminated with lights and décor.

== Construction ==
The Bambawali Ravi-Bedian (BRB) Canal at the east of the city of Lahore was constructed during the Mughal Era. During the British Colonial Rule of India, the British sliced through the BRB Canal and extended it westward to the town of Raiwind, located south of Lahore.

The idea to extend the Nahr may have possibly emerged because an irrigation system was felt necessary after the disastrous Agra famine hit the subcontinent in 1837-38. Nearly ten million rupees was spent on relief works, resulting in considerable losses to the British East India Company.

== Route ==
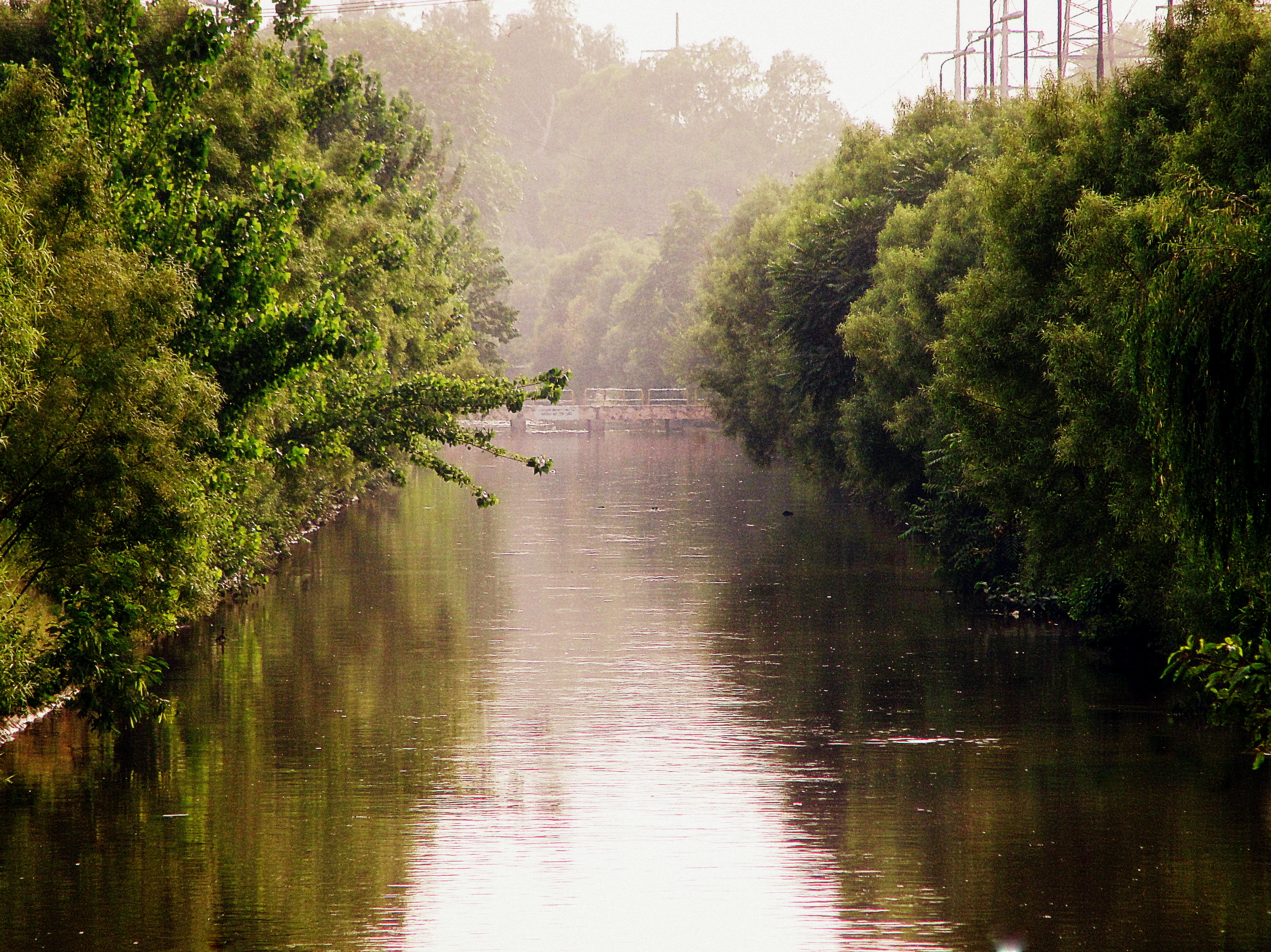
Downstream view of the Nahr at Mughalpura

The Nahr starts from BRB canal, just a few yards away from the Khaira Village, dividing the old neighborhoods of Lahore (on the west-side of the Canal) from the trendy areas of the rich (on the east side of the Canal). Metrobus (Lahore) also crosses it through a flyover on the way. The Muslim Town Flyover is also present over the canal. After crossing the Thokar Niaz Baig, it turns left and moves parallel to the Raiwind road. Flowing between the main highways, the canal also serves as the chief artery of the city.

== Culture and arts ==
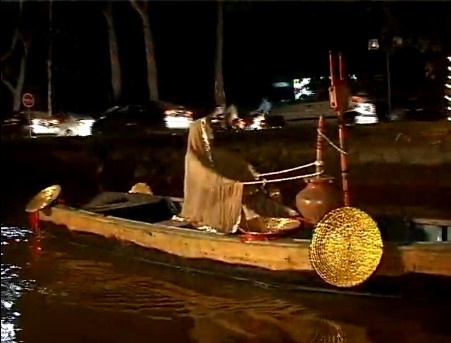
Canal decorated in a cultural style by OMORÉ.

The canal is an important part of Lahore's culture. Hundreds of people come to swim in the canal during summer.

On local, national and religious festivals, such as Jashn-e-Baharan (the welcoming of spring), Basant, Eid, Pakistan's Independence Day and Pakistan Day the canal is illuminated with lights and different types of décor are laid out into the water. Many companies like OMORÉ have also used the canal as a way to promote their brand.

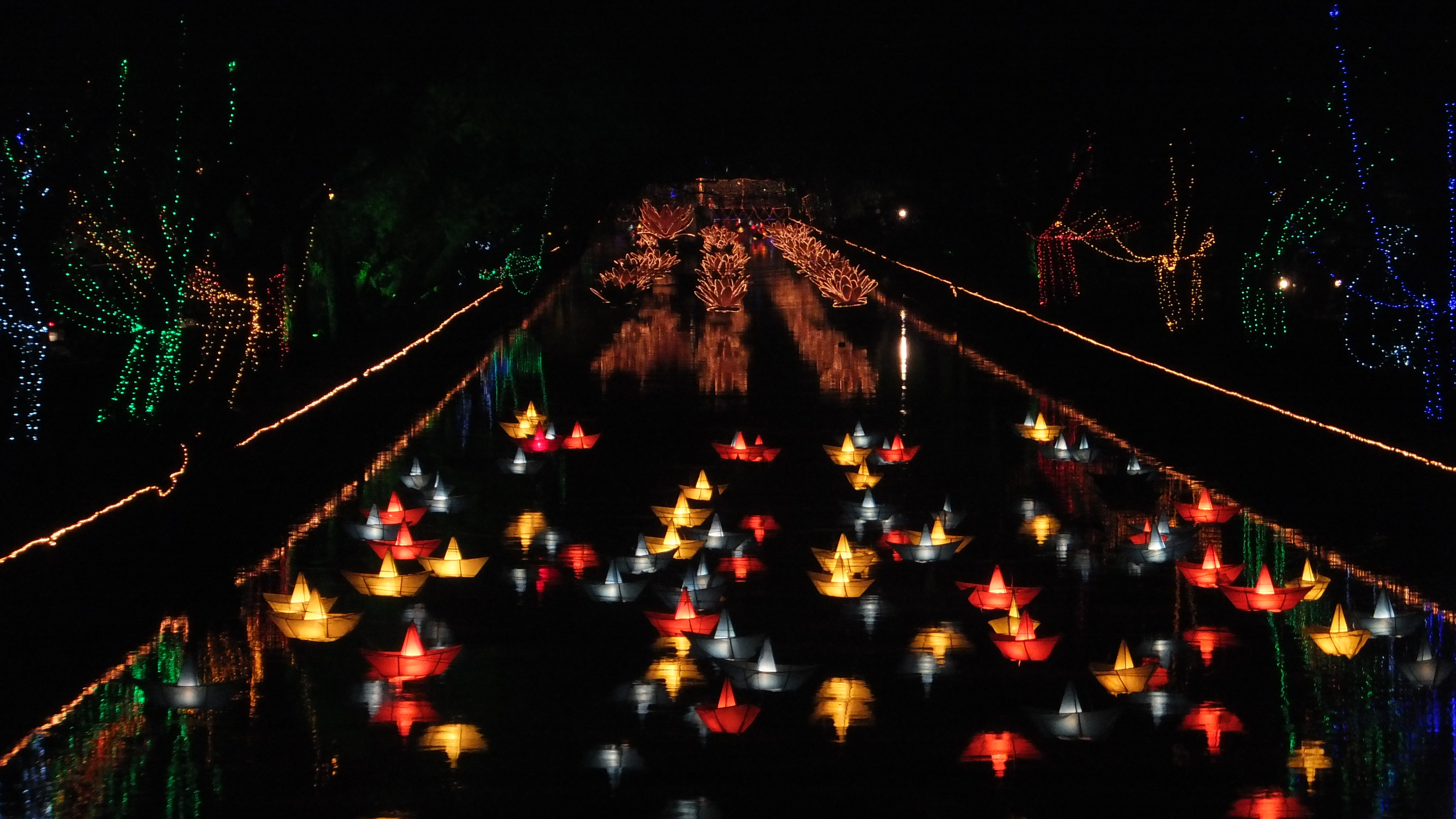
The Nahr during the spring Basant festival

== Problems ==
=== Unhealthy water ===
The canal water is said to be toxic and unhygienic. The samples of the canal water were examined at the Environment Department’s specialized laboratory in Lahore and showed “excessive limits of sulfide, biochemical oxygen demand, chemical oxygen demand (COD), total dissolved solids, total suspended solids, chlorine and sulphate; a disturbed pH balance and several other imbalances” because of the chemicals being thrown into the canal. The report found that all of the pollutants were in excess of the limit set by national environment quality standards. The citizens who swim in that water and even drink from it were oblivious to the fact that this polluted water can cause diseases like hepatitis and various skin diseases.

=== Desiltation ===
In early 2008, water was stopped from flowing into the canal to carry out de-silting and cleaning up any mess from the canal-bed. Cranes were seen digging out all the mud and filling truck-loads on the canal banks.

After the process had been completed and the canal bed looked uniform, the irrigation officials let the water flow again on February 10, 2008.

The canal is de-silted annually by the Punjab Irrigation in the months of December and January.

=== Criticism of government ===
Lahore Bachao Tehreek’s (Save Lahore Movement) case against the widening of the Nahr iss still pending before the Supreme Court. Until now, no steps have been taken to purify the waters of the canal. “The water in the canal is made to look clean and purified when VIPs have to go along the canal route, after which there is a return to the dismal conditions,” Dr Ijaz of the Lahore Conservation Society Information Secretary said, adding that the government was not sincerely concerned about the welfare of its people and was exposing them to the harmful water of the canal. Mustansar Hussain Tarar and others have criticized the road-widening project in Express News documentary film Bahao.

== Developmental projects ==
=== Swimming areas ===
Plans have been brought to convert parts of the canal into a proper swimming area. Experts believe that the plan will have a positive impact on the lifestyle of the citizens who have been deprived of any such facility for a long time. Under the proposed plan, the government would stop the flow of water for a few weeks to properly clean the basin of the Canal and design it to avoid any accidents. Stairs would be built in the Canal at different points with boards set up on sides mentioning the Canal’s depth to prohibit children from swimming in some places. Moreover, proper lifeguards, lifejackets, medical teams, swimming accessories and other required facilities would also be made available at the swimming points. Proper food stalls and greenery in sitting places with proper maintenance would also be ensured to entertain visitors who do not know how to swim.

The government would provide facilities at par with international standards, keeping in mind the domestic cultural norms at the same time. The facility would be provided on selected points depending on the depth of the canal.

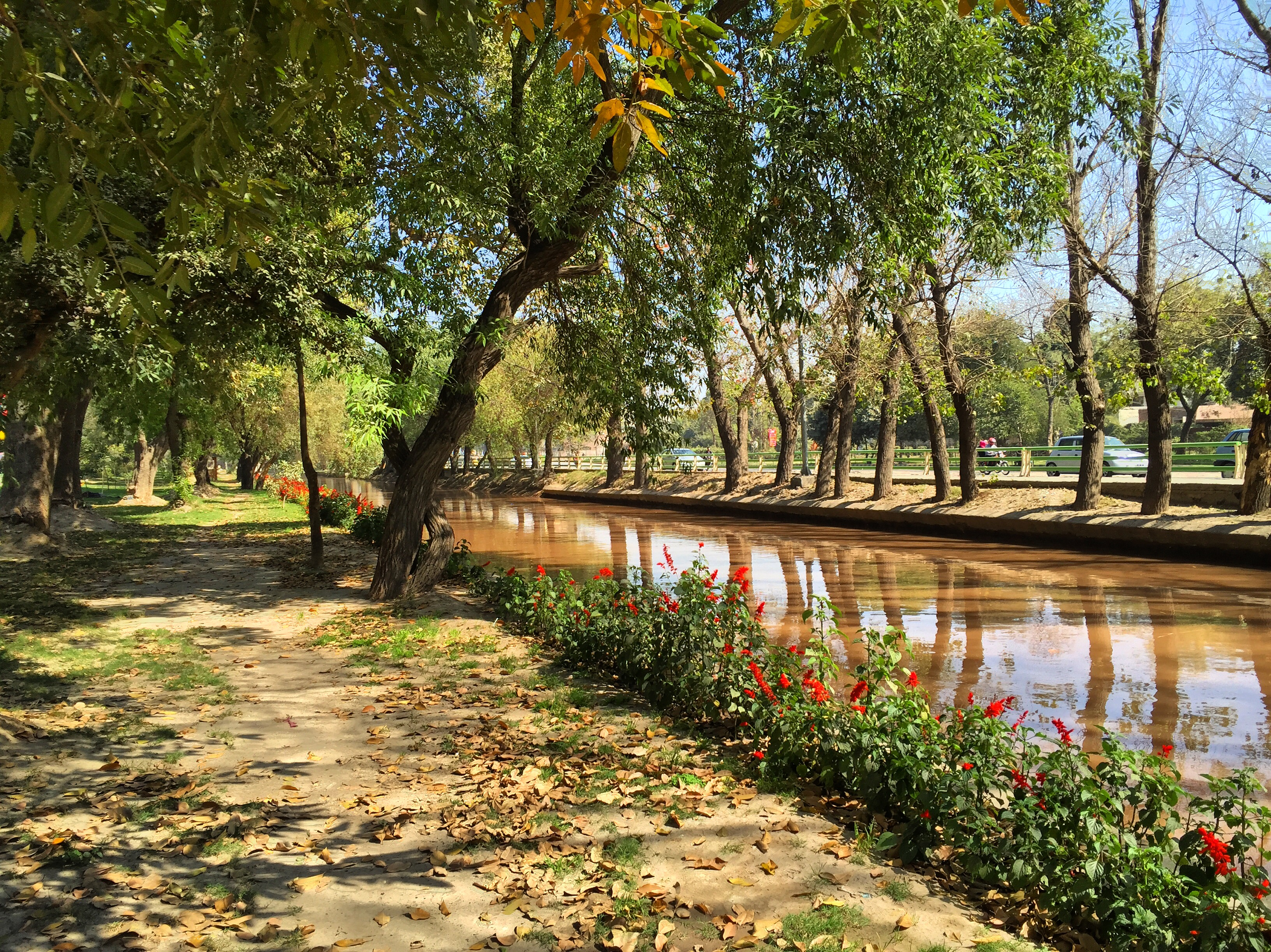
The Nahr, picture taken near Ferozepur Road.

The Parks and Horticulture Authority (PHA) would be spearheading the plan while other departments including Tourism, Communication and Works and Irrigation would execute the proposed development work later. “We will develop a state-of-the-art facility for the public with a lot of trees, which will not only beautify the spots but improve the environmental condition of the historic city,” PHA Director General Dr Raheel Ahmad Siddiqui said.
