= Shuja Khanzada =

Pakistani officer and politician (1943–2015)

Colonel Shuja Khanzada HS TBt
- شجاع خانزاده
- Khanzada as Captain of PAVO Cavalry, 1969

Home Minister of Punjab
- In office 14 October 2014 – 16 August 2015
- Appointed by: Shehbaz Sharif

Environment Protection Minister of Punjab
- In office 10 June 2013 – 16 August 2015
- Appointed by: Shehbaz Sharif

Personal details
- Born: 28 August 1943 Shadi Khan, Punjab Province (British India)
- Died: 16 August 2015 (aged 71) Attock, Punjab, Pakistan
- Cause of death: Assassination
- Party: PML (N) (2008-2015)
- Other political affiliations: PML (Q) (2002–2008); PTI (1996–2002)
- Education: Islamia College, Peshawar
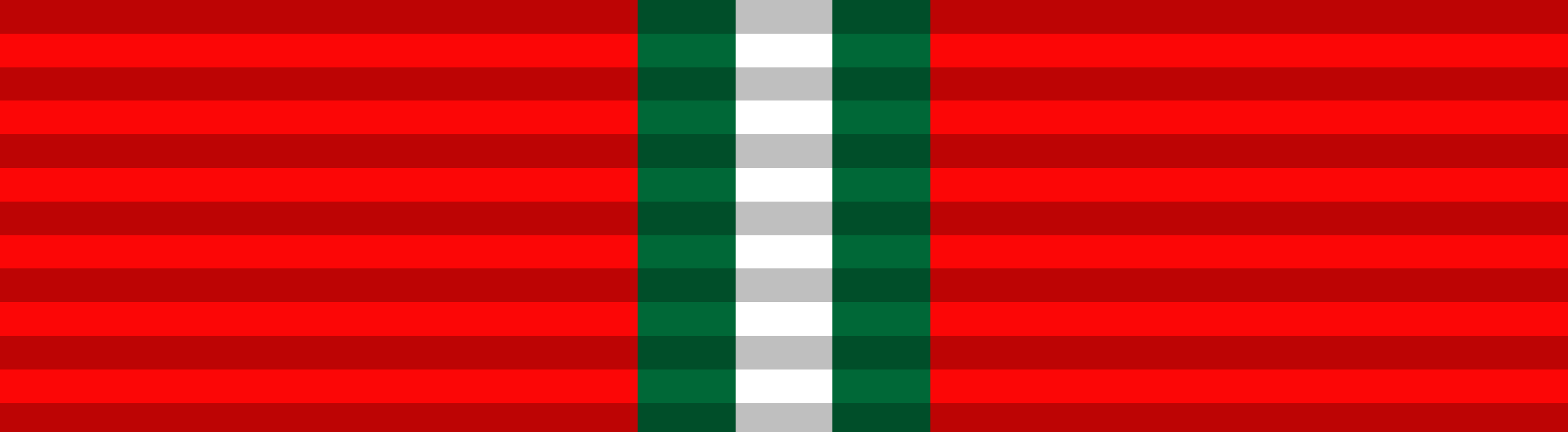
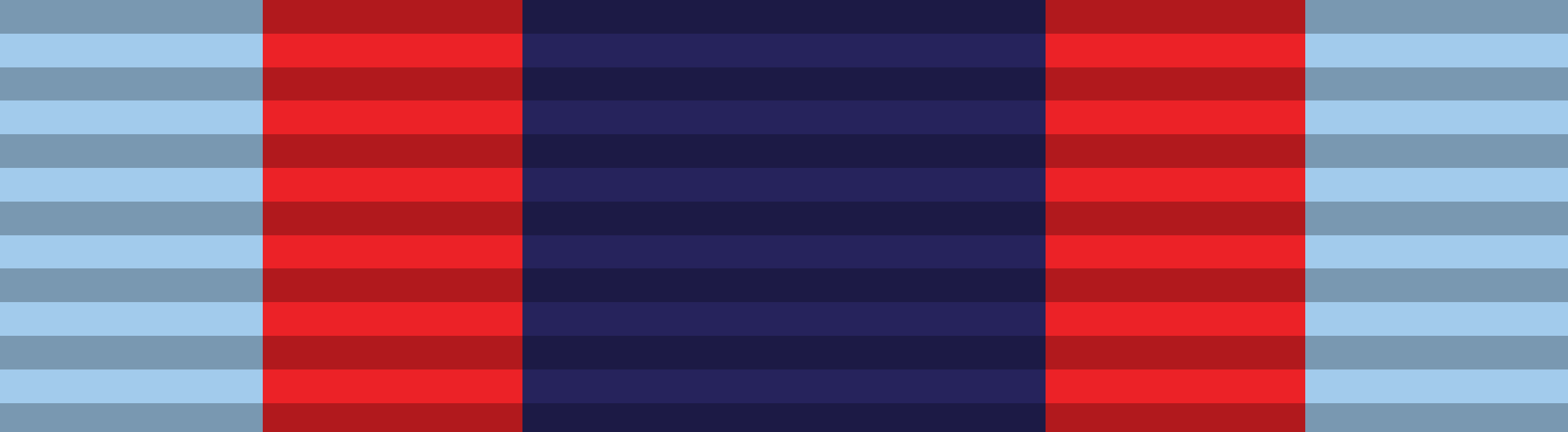
- Awards: Hilal-e-Shujaat Tamgha-e-Basalat

Military service
- Branch/service: Pakistan Army
- Years of service: 1967–1994
- Rank: Colonel
- Unit: 13th Lancers
- Battles/wars: Indo-Pakistani War of 1971; Siachen conflict

Shuja Khanzada (Note: Urdu: شجاع خانزاده) (28 August 1943 – 16 August 2015) was a Pakistani politician and retired army colonel, who was serving as the Home Minister of Punjab from 2014 until his assassination on 16 August 2015.

As an army officer, Khanzada fought in the 1971 Indo-Pakistani war, before partaking in the Siachen conflict in 1983. Retiring from the military, Khanzada entered politics in 1996. He was elected to the Punjab Provincial Assembly thrice, in 2002, 2008, and 2013; the latter as a PML (N) candidate from his native constituency in Attock. Appointed Home Minister in 2014, Khanzada spearheaded the campaign against terrorism and sectarian militancy in Punjab.

On 16 August 2015, Khanzada was assassinated in a suicide attack at his political office in Shadi Khan, Attock. The militant group Lashkar-e-Jhangvi (LeJ) claimed responsibility for the attack, in retaliation for the killing of LeJ chief Malik Ishaq during Khanzada's tenure. A number of his family members had been killed in a suicide attack on a funeral near Mardan, two years earlier.

== Early life ==
Born to a Pashtun family of the Yusufzai tribe, Khanzada's grandfather Captain Ajab Khan was a member of the Indian Legislative Assembly (in British India) and his uncle Taj Muhammad Khanzada was a member of the National Assembly and Punjab Provincial Assembly from the 1950s to the late 1990s. He matriculated at the Public School Nowshera, followed by FSc. and graduation from the Islamia College in Peshawar with a bachelor's degree in arts in 1966. In 1967, he was commissioned into the Pakistan Army. Khanzada was married and had three children. His son, Jahangir Khanzada, succeeded him as a member of the provincial assembly in by-elections on 6 October 2015 from the family's native constituency of PP-16, following Shuja's assassination. Three of his cousins died in the Mardan funeral bombing in 2013. Another family member, Major Javed Alam Khanzada was a senior bureaucrat in Khyber Pakhtunkhwa and committed suicide in 2004.

== Military career ==
During his military career, Khanzada fought in the 1971 Indo-Pakistani war, served as an instructor in 1974–1978 and 1982–1983, and commanded the 13th Lancers in 1983–85. He was also present at the Siachen Glacier in 1983. In 1988, he was awarded the Tamgha-e-Basalat for his services. In 1992–1994, he was posted as a military attaché at the Pakistani embassy in Washington, D.C. He was also a field officer of the Inter-Services Intelligence (ISI), working for the intelligence agency for over a decade from the 1980s to the mid-1990s, during which he specialised in affairs related to Balochistan and Afghanistan.

== Political career ==
Following his retirement from the military, Khanzada entered politics in 1996. For some time, he was affiliated with the Pakistan Tehreek-e-Insaf as a founding member, before joining the Pakistan Muslim League (Q). He was elected as a member of the Provincial Assembly of Punjab from 2002 to 2007 as a PML (Q) legislator. He served as a special advisor to the Chief Minister and held a ministry portfolio. He was elected to the provincial assembly again in 2008 as an independent candidate, and in the 2013 elections as a PML (N) member, from his native Constituency PP-16. Khanzada was appointed Punjab Environment Protection Minister on 10 June 2013.

=== Home Minister ===
Khanzada was assigned the additional charge of the Home Ministry by the Pakistan Muslim League (N) provincial government on 14 October 2014, in a cabinet reshuffle.

== Death and legacy ==
On 16 August 2015, Khanzada's home office in Shadi Khan was attacked in a suicide blast, killing him and at least 18 other people, including a number of his relatives. According to a preliminary investigation, the attack may have been retaliation for the killing of Lashkar-e-Jhangvi militant leader Malik Ishaq by the Punjab Police during Khanzada's term in office. The attack was strongly condemned throughout the country, including by Prime Minister Nawaz Sharif and Chief of Army Staff General Raheel Sharif. The Lahore City District Government announced that a major new road inaugurated in Lahore, connecting Karim Block and Jinnah Hospital across the Lahore Canal, would be named after Shuja Khanzada.

== Awards and decorations ==
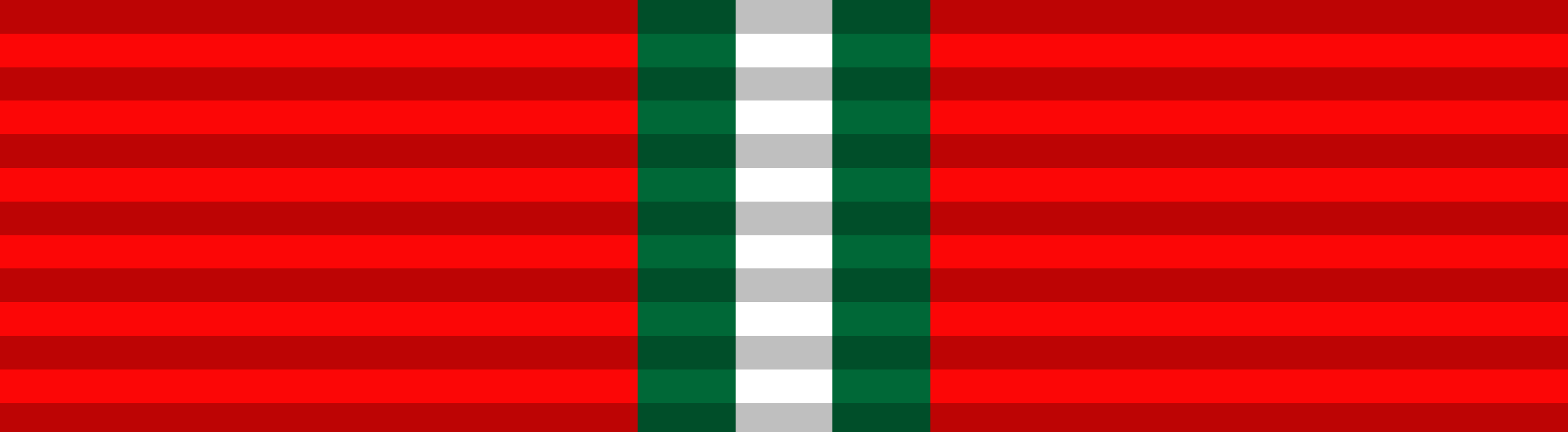

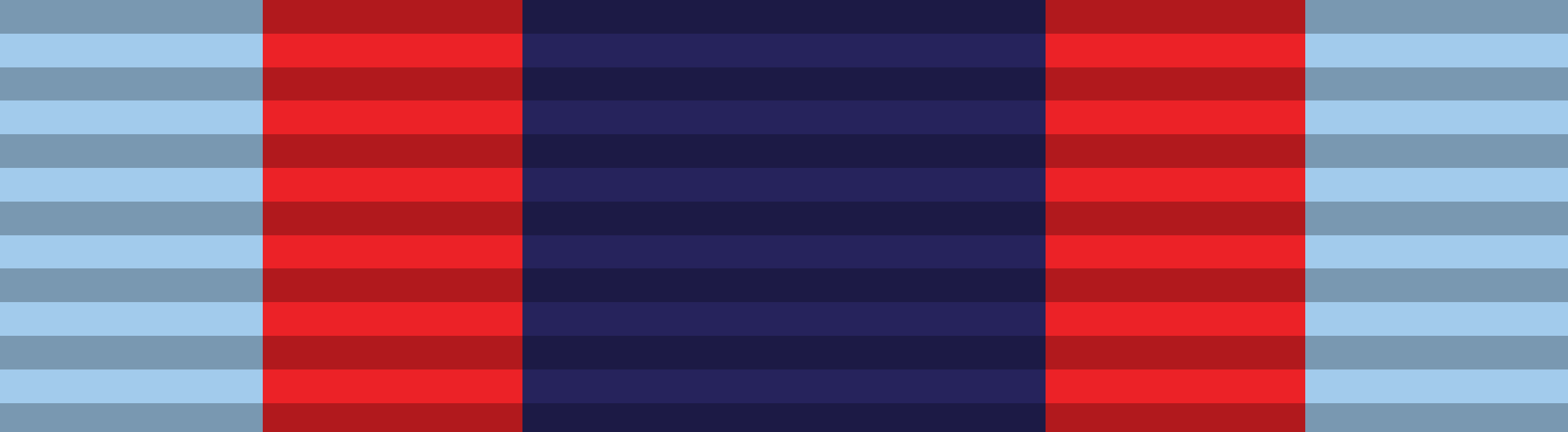

Hilal-e-Shujaat (Crescent of Bravery) POSTHUMOUS		Tamgha-e-Basalat (Medal of Good Conduct) 1988	
Sitara-e-Harb 1971 War (War Star 1971)	Tamgha-e-Jang 1971 War (War Medal 1971)	10 Years Service Medal	20 Years Service Medal
Tamgha-e-Qayam-e-Jamhuria (Republic Commemoration Medal) 1956	Hijri Tamgha (Hijri Medal) 1979	Tamgha-e-Jamhuriat (Democracy Medal) 1988	Qarardad-e-Pakistan Tamgha (Resolution Day Golden Jubilee Medal) 1990

== See also ==
- Bashir Ahmad Bilour, assassinated politician
- Chaudhry Aslam Khan, assassinated police superintendent
