= Assassination of Shuja Khanzada =

2015 bombing in Shadikhan, Pakistan

- Assassination of Shuja Khanzada (Pakistan)
- Location: 33°55′21″N 72°22′46″E; Shadikhan, Attock District, Punjab, Pakistan
- Date: 16 August 2015
- Target: Shuja Khanzada, civilians
- Attack type: Assassination, suicide attack
- Weapon: Explosive belt
- Deaths: 19
- Injuries: 17
- Perpetrator: Lashkar-e-Jhangvi (LeJ)
- Motive: Revenge
- Accused: 1

On 16 August 2015, two suspected suicide bombers detonated explosives at the political office of Punjab Interior Minister Shuja Khanzada in the Attock District village of Shadi Khan, 80 km (50 mi) from the Pakistani capital Islamabad. The blasts killed the minister and 18 other people; at least 17 people were injured and hospitalised. Lashkar-e-Jhangvi (LeJ), a Deobandi militant group with ties to Al-Qaeda, claimed responsibility for the attack, and it was later determined that Tehrik-i-Taliban Pakistan was also involved.

== Attack ==
On Sunday, 16 August 2015, 71-year-old Shuja Khanzada was meeting with relatives and friends at his home office in the village of Shadi Khan to condole the death of a relative who had died in the United Kingdom, when the attack was perpetrated by two men strapped with a combined 15 kg (33 lb) of explosives. According to the initial investigation, the bombers' intent was to cause the building to collapse. The first bomber entered Khanzada's home office, shook his hand and detonated the device while standing next to one of the pillars on the veranda. It is believed a second bomber, standing in the street next to the building, then detonated his explosives, causing the building to collapse and the falling roof trapping people under the rubble.

== Investigation ==
According to a preliminary investigation, the attack may have been retaliation for the killing of Lashkar-e-Jhangvi militant leader Malik Ishaq by the Punjab Police. Later investigation by the Counter Terrorism Department (CTD) of the Punjab Police and Inter-Services Intelligence determined that the terrorist group Tehrik-i-Taliban Pakistan was also involved. On 1 October, CTD raided a house in Iqbal Town, Lahore, killing four people suspected of being involved in the bombing.

In September 2015, one suspect, Qasim Muavia, was arrested. Two years later in August 2017, the Punjab government transferred his trial to military court, stating that civilian court was taking too long. An additional suspect was arrested in March 2016, and in October 2017, one more suspect was killed during a confrontation with police.

The attack was strongly condemned throughout the country, including by Prime Minister Nawaz Sharif and Chief of Army Staff General Raheel Shareef.

== International reactions ==
The attack was condemned by international leaders, including United Nations Secretary-General Ban Ki-moon, who called for justice against those who planned the attack.

The United States also condemned the attack and offered to assist with the investigation. The U.S. Embassy in Islamabad issued a statement, saying, "We support Pakistan's determination to bring to justice those behind the attack and are prepared to provide assistance, if requested, to government authorities investigating this reprehensible act."

== See also ==
- List of terrorist incidents in 2015
- Targeted killings in Pakistan
- Terrorist incidents in Pakistan in 2015
