= Malik Ishaq =

Pakistani militant leader (1959–2015)

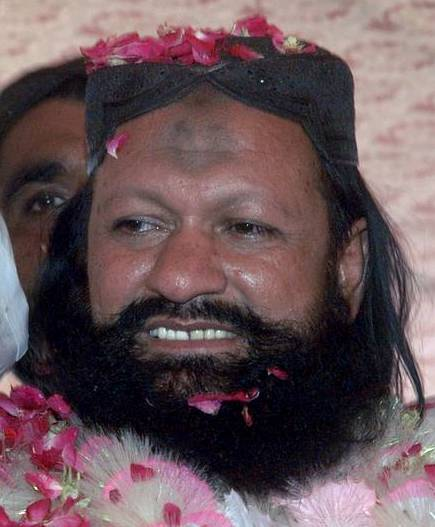
- Ishaq in 2011
- Born: 1959; Taranda Sawaey Khan, Rahim Yar Khan, Punjab, Pakistan
- Died: 29 July 2015 (aged 55–56); Muzaffargarh, Punjab, Pakistan
- Children: Usman †; Haq Nawaz †
- Military career
- Allegiance: Sipah-e-Sahaba (1988–1996); Lashkar-e-Jhangvi (1996–2015)
- Active: 1996–2015
- Rank: Emir of Lashkar-e-Jhangvi
- Conflicts: Sectarianism in Pakistan; Balochistan conflict; War in North-West Pakistan

2nd Emir of Lashkar-e-Jhangvi
- Preceded by: Riaz Basra

Vice-President of Ahle Sunnat Wal Jamaat
- In office 2012 – 29 July 2015

Malik Ishaq (Urdu: ملک اسحاق; 1959 – 29 July 2015) was a Pakistani militant globally designated terrorist, and leader and co-founder of the Lashkar-e-Jhangvi (LeJ) terrorist organization.

Formerly a member of anti-Shia militant group Sipah-e-Sahaba, Ishaq co-founded the LeJ in 1996. Under Ishaq's leadership, the LeJ claimed responsibility for several mass-casualty attacks largely targeting Pakistan's Shia and Barelvi population, including multiple bombings that killed over 200 Hazara Shias in Quetta in 2013. He was also accused of masterminding the attack on the Sri Lankan cricket team in Lahore in 2009, and the Ashura bombings in Afghanistan in 2011.

Malik was killed, along with his two sons and deputy Ghulam Rasool Shah, in a police encounter on 29 July 2015, the circumstances of which are disputed. Punjab Home Minister Shuja Khanzada was assassinated in Attock a month later, in an attack claimed by LeJ as retaliation. Ishaq was described by various news agencies as Pakistan's most feared terror kingpin.

He was sanctioned as a Specially Designated Global Terrorist under the Specially Designated Nationals and Blocked Persons List by the United States Department of the Treasury's Office of Foreign Assets Control.

== Early life ==
Malik Ishaq was born to a poor family in Rahim Yar Khan District of Punjab, Pakistan. His father was a cloth merchant. Educated until sixth class, Ishaq spent three years working at his father's shop until 1984, when he began working as a cigarette vendor according to police records.

== Sipah-e-Sahaba member ==
Ishaq came under the influence of Haq Nawaz Jhangvi, the founder of anti-Shia militant group Sipah-e-Sahaba Pakistan (SSP), in the 1980s. The SSP claimed to be countering the Iranian Revolution and the Pakistan-based pro-Iranian Shia activist group Tehreek Nifaz-e-Fiqh Jafariya Pakistan. Ishaq became an active participant in the SSP's activities, and was jailed for the first time for acts of hate speech during Muharram in 1989.

== Lashkar-e-Jhangvi co-founder and leader ==
In 1996, Ishaq, along with Riaz Basra and Akram Lahori, co-founded LeJ, a violent splinter group of the original SSP. He confessed his involvement in the killing of 102 Shias to an Urdu newspaper in October 1997, before being rearrested. He assumed senior leadership of LeJ from jail after Basra was killed in a police encounter in 2002.

Forging ties with al Qaeda and the Pakistani Taliban following the 9/11 attacks, Ishaq was charged with more than 100 murders and 45 criminal cases, including masterminding the attack on the Sri Lankan cricket team in Lahore in 2009.

He was never convicted, owing to weak evidence and intimidation of judges and witnesses.

=== Release and possible deal ===
Ishaq was released on bail after 14 years in July 2011, amid speculation of a deal and growing ties with the Pakistan Muslim League (N), the ruling party in Punjab. He was showered with rose petals by supporters, and received by Tahir Ashrafi and SSP president Ahmad Ludhianvi.

The province's Law Minister Rana Sanaullah denied there was any deal behind Ishaq's release, but said extremist leaders were free to join politics if they eschewed violence. Sanaullah said of the occasion, "We are in touch with those who have become, or want to become, useful citizens." Soon after his release, The Associated Press reported Ishaq again making public speeches against the Shia community and threatening his opponents on 4 September 2011, saying "We know how to kill and how to die." Ishaq was appointed vice-president of Ahle Sunnat Wal Jamaat, the renamed SSP, in 2012.

=== Ashura bombings in Kabul and Mazar-i-Sharif ===
On 6 December 2011, a suicide bomber attacked the Abu Fazl Mosque in the Murad Khane neighbourhood of Kabul, claiming more than 50 lives. The second bomb took place near the Blue Mosque in the northern city of Mazar-e-Sharif, where four people were killed. Ishaq's LeJ claimed responsibility. Afghanistan President Hamid Karzai said he would discuss the matter with Pakistan.

=== Quetta bombings ===
Ishaq was rearrested after the LeJ claimed responsibility for multiple bombings that killed over 200 Hazara Shias in Quetta in January and February, 2013. Taken together, the bombings were the deadliest attack against any minority in the history of Pakistan.

== Death and aftermath ==
Malik Ishaq was killed in Muzaffargarh, Punjab, in a police encounter with the Counter Terrorism Department of the Punjab Police on the morning of 29 July 2015, along with his two sons, Usman and Haq Nawaz. Also killed among Ishaq's entourage were 11 others, including his deputy and purported LeJ second-in-command Syed Ghulam Rasool Shah, as well as Shah's two sons.

According to the police, Ishaq and his associates were being shifted from Multan to Muzaffargarh to locate an illegal weapons storage site, when a group of armed supporters attacked the police convoy in an attempt to free Ishaq. This was disputed by local and international news agencies including The Economist, which stated, "The police have barely bothered to pretend the incident was anything other than a mass extra-judicial killing."

=== Assassination of Home Minister Shuja Khanzada ===
On 16 August 2015, the home office of Punjab Home Minister Shuja Khanzada, located in Shadikhan, Attock, was attacked by two suicide bombers, killing Khanzada and 18 others. Preliminary reports prepared by Pakistani law enforcement agencies suggested Khanzada was attacked in retaliation for the killing of Malik Ishaq. The LeJ claimed responsibility for the attack, confirming it was for Ishaq's killing in July.

== See also ==
- Deobandi jihadism
