= Campino =

Campino may refer to:

- Campino (profession), a Portuguese cattle herder
- Campino (candy), a brand of hard candy
- Campino (singer) (born 1962), the stage name of German singer Andreas Frege
- Campino (Burgos), a locality in Alfoz de Bricia, Province of Burgos, Spain
- Enrique Campino (1794–1874), Chilean politician
- Giovanni Campino (Giovanni di Filippo del Campo, 1600–1648), Flemish Baroque painter mostly working in Italy

== See also ==
- António Campinos, Portuguese civil servant and current president of the European Patent Office
- Campinho (disambiguation)
- Campina (disambiguation)
