= Vinamilk =

Vietnamese dairy company

Vinamilk Vietnam Dairy Products JSC
- Logo since July 2023

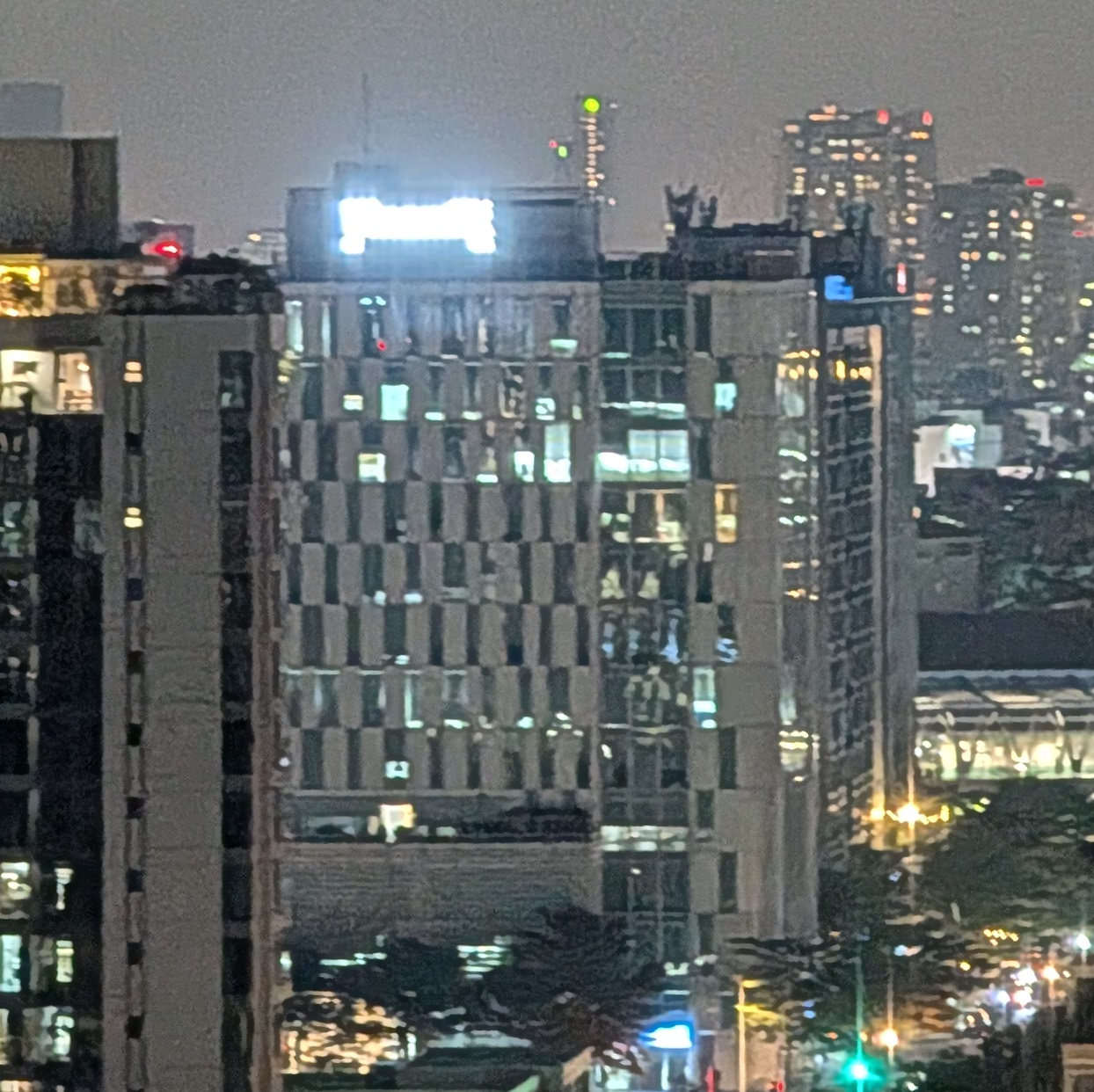
- Vinamilk Tower
- Native name: Công ty Cổ phần Sữa Việt Nam (lit. 'Vietnam Milk Joint Stock Company')
- Type: Government-owned
- Traded as: HOSE: VNM
- ISIN: VN000000VNM8
- Industry: Dairy products, juice
- Founded: 1976
- Headquarters: Vinamilk Tower, 10 Tân Trào, Tân Phú Ward, District 7, Ho Chi Minh City, Vietnam
- Area served: Worldwide
- Key people: Mai Kieu Lien - CEO
- Products: liquid milk, condensed milk, powdered milk, probiotic, yogurt, ice cream, soft drinks
- Brands: Vinamilk, 100%, Green Farm, Optimum, YokoGold, Dielac, Ridielac, Probi, SuSu, Ong Tho, Ngoi Sao Phuong Nam, Sure, Moc Chau Creamery
- Services: General clinic, investing, real estate
- Revenue: ▲52.63 trillion VND (2018) ($2.2 billion) ▲51.135 trillion VND (2017) ($2.2 billion)
- Net income: ▲10.278 trillion VND (2017)
- Owner: Ministry of Transport (100%)
- Number of employees: 6000 (2017)
- Website: Official website

Vinamilk, formally the Vietnam Dairy Products Joint Stock Company (Vietnamese: Công ty Cổ phần Sữa Việt Nam, lit. 'Vietnam Milk Joint Stock Company') is the largest dairy company in Vietnam. It was also the 15th largest company in Vietnam and formerly the most valuable public company listed in Vietnam. In 2010, it is the first company in Vietnam to be included in the Forbes Asia's 200 Best Under A Billion list that highlights 200 top-performing small- and mid-sized companies with annual revenue under US$1 billion.

The company was established in 1976 as the state-owned Southern Coffee-Dairy Company, to nationalize and take over the operations of three previously private dairy factories in South Vietnam: Thống Nhất (belonging to a Chinese company), Trường Thọ (formerly owned by Friesland Foods, best known for its production of condensed milk that was widely distributed across the South) and Dielac (Nestlé). It was renamed United Enterprises of Milk Coffee Cookies and Candies in 1978. It became the Vietnam Dairy Company, formally established in 1993. In 2003, following its IPO to the Ho Chi Minh Stock Exchange, the company legally changed its name to Vietnam Dairy Products Joint Stock Company (trading name "Vinamilk"). The principal activities of the Vinamilk are to produce and distribute condensed milk, powdered milk, fresh milk, soya milk, yogurts, ice-cream, cheese, fruit juice, coffee and other products derived from milk government by the Ministry of Transport (now in Ministry of Construction) (100%) shareholders.

Vinamilk products such as powdered milk and condensed milk are also exported to the Middle East, Cambodia, the Philippines and Australia. Exports accounted for $180m in 2012. Vinamilk's main competitors are Dutch Lady Vietnam (a division of Friesland Foods), Nestlé Vietnam, Abbott, Mead Johnson (a subsidiary of Reckitt), Friso and Nutifood. In September 2016, Vinamilk signed a strategic cooperation agreement with Chr. Hansen to develop probiotics.

== History ==
=== The Subsidy Period (1976-1986) ===
In 1976, upon its establishment, the Vietnam Dairy Company (Vinamilk) was named the Southern Milk and Coffee Company, operating under the Southern Food Industry General Department, following the government's nationalisation of three dairy factories: the Thong Nhat Dairy Factory (formerly Foremost Dairies Vietnam S.A.R.L., in operation since 1965), the Truong Tho Dairy Factory (formerly Cosuvina, established by Overseas Chinese entrepreneurs in 1972, and the Dielac Powdered Milk Factory (an unfinished construction project belonging to Nestlé). In 1982, the Southern Milk and Coffee Company was transferred to the Ministry of Food Industry and renamed the Milk - Coffee - Confectionery Union Enterprise I. At this time, the enterprise had two additional member factories:

- Lubico Confectionery Factory
- Bich Chi Nutritional Powder Factory (Dong Thap Province)

=== The Renovation Period (1986-2003) ===
In March 1992, the Milk - Coffee - Confectionery Union Enterprise I was officially renamed Vietnam Dairy Company (Vinamilk), operating under the Ministry of Light Industry, specialising in the production and processing of milk and dairy products.

In 1994, Vinamilk constructed an additional dairy factory in Hanoi to develop the northern market, bringing the total number of member factories to four. The construction was part of the company's strategy to expand operations and meet the growing demand of the northern market.

In 1996, Vinamilk entered into a joint venture with Quy Nhon Frozen Products Joint Stock Company to establish the Binh Dinh Dairy Joint Venture Enterprise, enabling the company to successfully penetrate the Central Vietnamese market.

In 2000, the Can Tho Dairy Factory was constructed at the Tra Noc Industrial Zone, Can Tho, with the aim of better serving consumers in the Mekong Delta. During the same period, the company also established a Logistics and Warehousing Enterprise located at 32 Dang Van Bi Street, Ho Chi Minh City.

In May 2001, the company inaugurated its dairy factory in Can Tho.

=== Period of equitization (2003 -) ===
In 2003, the company was converted into Vietnam Dairy Products Joint Stock Company (November). Its stock ticker on the securities exchange is VNM. Also in 2003, the company inaugurated dairy factories in Binh Dinh and Ho Chi Minh City.

In 2004, Vinamilk acquired Saigon Dairy Joint Stock Company and increased its charter capital to VND 1,590 billion.

In 2005, Vinamilk acquired the remaining shares from its joint venture partner in the Binh Dinh Dairy Joint Venture Company (subsequently renamed the Binh Dinh Dairy Factory) and inaugurated the Nghe An Dairy Factory on 30 June 2005, located at the Cua Lo Industrial Zone, Nghe An Province. During the same period, Vinamilk and VPBank (then known as Vietnam Private Commercial Joint Stock Bank) became co-sponsors of the startup gameshow Khởi Nghiệp on VTV3.

- In August 2005, Vinamilk entered into a joint venture with SABMiller Asia B.V. to establish SABMiller Vietnam Joint Venture Company Limited. The joint venture's first product, under the Zorok brand, was launched to the market in mid-2007.

In 2006, Vinamilk was listed on the Ho Chi Minh City Stock Exchange on 19 January 2006, at which time the State Capital Investment Corporation (SCIC) held a 50.01% stake in the company's charter capital. During the same period, Vinamilk sponsored the gameshow Tam Sao That Ban.

- In June 2006, the An Khang Clinic was opened in Ho Chi Minh City, the first clinic in Vietnam to be managed by an electronic information system. The clinic provided services including nutritional counselling, gynaecology, paediatric consultation, and general health check-ups.
- The company's dairy farm programme was launched with the acquisition of the Tuyen Quang Dairy Farm in November 2006 - a small farm with a herd of approximately 1,400 dairy cows - which commenced operations immediately following the acquisition.

On 20 August 2006, Vinamilk updated its corporate logo.

In 2007, Vinamilk acquired a controlling 55% stake in Lam Son Dairy Company in September 2007, headquartered at the Le Mon Industrial Zone, Thanh Hoa Province. Vinamilk also adopted the new corporate slogan "A Beautiful Life" (Cuộc sống tươi đẹp).

From the 2008 season through to the end of the 2013 season, Vinamilk sponsored the children's singing programme Đồ Rê Mí.

In 2009, the company expanded its distribution network to 135,000 agents, operated 9 factories, and developed dairy farms in Nghe An and Tuyen Quang. The corporate slogan was also changed from "A Beautiful Life" to "Vietnam's Trust" (Niềm tin Việt Nam).

In 2010, the slogan was updated from "Vietnam's Trust" to "Reaching Higher, Vietnam" (Vươn cao Việt Nam).

Between 2010 and 2012, Vinamilk constructed liquid milk and powdered milk factories in Binh Duong Province with a total investment of US$220 million, and established the Vietnam Beverage Factory.

In 2011, the Da Nang Dairy Factory commenced operations with an investment of US$30 million.

In 2012, Vinamilk introduced a new corporate logo, replacing the 2006 version.

In 2013, Phase 1 of the Vietnam Dairy Factory (Mega Factory) commenced operations at My Phuoc 2 Industrial Zone, Binh Duong Province, with a production capacity of 400 million litres of milk per year.

In 2016, the Angkormilk Dairy Factory in Cambodia was inaugurated.

In 2017, Vinamilk inaugurated the Vinamilk Organic Da Lat Farm in Lam Dong Province, the first dairy farm in Vietnam certified to the European Union organic standard by Control Union (Netherlands), with an investment of over VND 200 billion and an initial herd of more than 500 cows. It also established the Cu Chi Fresh Raw Milk Centre.

In 2018, Farm No. 1 of the Vinamilk Thanh Hoa High-Tech Dairy Farm Complex was inaugurated. Construction also commenced on the Vinamilk Lao-Jagro Organic Dairy Farm Complex in Laos. Vinamilk became the first company to produce A2 milk in Vietnam.

In 2019, the Tay Ninh Dairy Farm was inaugurated. That year, Vinamilk also acquired a 75% stake in GTNFoods, through which it took part in managing Moc Chau Dairy (Moc Chau Milk).

In April 2023, Vinamilk signed strategic partnerships with six nutrition and bioscience companies, DSM (Switzerland), Chr. Hansen (Denmark), BENEO (Germany), Gnosis (Italy), AAK (Sweden) and Kanematsu (Japan), to develop its infant formula products.

In July 2023, Vinamilk adopted a new brand identity and logo, with the message "Táo bạo. Quyết tâm. Luôn là chính mình." (lit. 'Bold. Determined. Always be yourself.')

== Ownership ==
Vietnam's Ministry of Construction (SCIC) holds 100% of the shares as of late 2017. 7.58% are owned by other Vietnamese investors, of which 0.28% are owned by CEO Mai Kieu Lien. Foreign investors hold over 53% of the shares.

- F&N Dairy Investments Pte Ltd: 16.50%
- Jardine Cycle & Carriage, via Platinum Victory Pte. Ltd. (PVPL): 10.03%
- F&N BEV Manufacturing PTE.Ltd: 2.70%
- Matthews Pacific Tiger Fund 2.02%
- Arisaig Asia Consumer Fund, Ltd 2.05%
- Deutsche Bank AG, London Branch: 1.09%
- other foreign investors: 30%

F&N have been holding shares of Vinamilk for a long time and have two representatives in the board of directors.

== Factories and subsidiaries ==
Vinamilk has factories in the following locations.

- Truong Tho Dairy Factory: Truong Tho, Thủ Đức, Ho Chi Minh City
- Dielac Dairy Factory: Binh An, Bien Hoa City, Dong Nai
- Thong Nhat Dairy Factory: Truong Tho, Thu Duc, Ho Chi Minh City
- Binh Dinh Dairy Factory: Quy Nhon City, Binh Dinh Province
- Da Nang Dairy Factory: Hoa Khanh, Lien Chieu district, Danang City
- Nghe An Dairy Factory: Nghi Thu, Cua Lo, Nghe An
- Sai Gon Dairy Factory: Hiep Thanh, District 12, Ho Chi Minh City
- Can Tho Dairy Factory: Tra Noc, Binh Thuy District, Can Tho
- Tien Son Factory: Tien Du, Bac Ninh

=== Subsidiaries ===
Vinamilk has subsidiaries in the following locations.

Domestic

- Vietnam Dairy Factory, Binh Duong province
- Vietnam Powdered Milk Factory, Binh Duong province
- Lam Son Dairy Factory, Thanh Hoa City, Thanh Hoa Province
- Thong Nhat Thanh Hoa Dairy Cow Co., Ltd., Yen Dinh District, Thanh Hoa Province
- Vietnam Dairy Cow One-Member Co., Ltd., District 7, Ho Chi Minh City

Foreign

- Angkor Dairy Products Co., LTD, Phnom Penh, Cambodia. Producer of major Cambodian dairy brand Angkormilk.
- Vinamilk Europe Sp.z O.O in Warsaw Poland. European operations, primarily to secure raw milk ingredients for domestic production.
- Driftwood Dairy Holding Corporation, El Monte, California, USA. Major Californian processor of milk and dairy products.
- Del Monte Vinamilk Dairy Philippines, Inc. Joint venture with NutriAsia.

=== Major brands ===
Vinamilk lists the following product brands on its website:

- Infant and children's formula, ready-to-drink formula and maternal milk: Optimum (Optimum Gold, Optimum Colos, Optimum A2 Pro+, Optimum Mama Gold), YokoGold, Dielac (Dielac Alpha, Dielac Gold, Dielac Grow Plus, Dielac Mama Gold)
- Infant cereal: Ridielac
- Fresh milk: Vinamilk 100%, Green Farm, Moc Chau Creamery
- Drinking yogurt: Probi, SuSu, Yomilk
- Condensed milk and creamer: Ong Tho, Ngoi Sao Phuong Nam (Southern Star)
- Adult nutrition (older adults and people with diabetes): Sure (Sure Prevent Gold, Sure Diacerna, Sure CanxiPro)
- Nutritional milk: ADM, Vinamilk Flex

Other products, including spoonable yogurt, nut milk, soy milk, ice cream, juice and cheese, are sold under the Vinamilk brand.

According to Vinamilk, Optimum Gold and Optimum Colos contain six human milk oligosaccharides (2'-FL, 3-FL, LNT, 3'-SL, 6'-SL and DFL), which the company describes as the first six-HMO formula in Vietnam as of 25 March 2025, based on market research by CI Research.

== Awards and achievements ==
- Hero of Labour (2000).
- Third-Class Independence Order (2005, 2016).
- Labor Order: Third Class (1985, 2005), Second Class (1991), First Class (1996).
- Top 15 Largest Companies in Vietnam (UNDP, 2007).
- Vietnam's Top 10 Brands (Nielsen Singapore, 2010).
- Vietnam's Top 500 Private Companies (VNR500) (2015).
- Forbes Asia's Fab 50 (2016).
- Forbes Global 2000: #1888 (2017).
- Forbes Asia's 200 Best Over A Billion (2019).
- Purity Award from the Clean Label Project (United States) for the infant formula products Optimum Gold, YokoGold, ColosGold, Pedia Kenji, Dielac Grow Plus, Dielac Alpha and Dielac Alpha Gold (announced April 2023). According to Vinamilk, these were the first infant formula products in Asia to receive the award.
