= Saddu Khan =

- Born: 11 October 1558; Kandahar
- Died: 18 March 1627 (aged 68); Kandahar The Family Tree of Malik Sidu: Qais Abdul Rashid; Satarbin; Khurushbun (Khairuddin); Tarin; Abdal; Zakhtar; Isa; Zirk; Popal; Habib; Bami; Gani; Bahlul; Maroof Khan; Umar; (Malik Saddo (Founder of the Saduzai tribe

Saddu Khan was a Pashtun figure, and the ancestor of the Saddozai clan, which is a branch of the Abdali confederation. Ahmad Shah Abdali belonged to the lineage of Sado, alongside some known families of Multan, Dera Ismail Khan and others settled throughout Afghanistan and Pakistan.

He succeeded his father as chief of the Habibzai section of the tribe, but due to his "bravery and ability" he was selected by the Abdalis (later known as Durrani), then living between Kandahar and Herat, to be their overall leader in 1598.

Shadi Khan, the governor of the Emperor Akbar at Kandahar, was hostile to Saddu Khan, resulting in Saddu supporting the rivaling Abbas I of Persia, whom had previously lost Kandahar in 1594 to the Mughals and was intriguing for its recovery. This culminated in the Safavid recapture of Kandahar in 1621, in which Saddu aided Abbas. As a reward for his services, he was declared the titular ruler of Kandahar. Saddu Khan died in 1626 leaving five sons, from whom descended the Saddozai (sons of Sado).

The descendants of Saddu Khan are the "Saddozai", the clan to which Ahmad Shah Durrani, Timur Shah, Zaman Shah, Hassan Javaid Khan and Shuja Shah Durrani belonged. Ahmad Shah Durrani founded the Durrani Empire, which the Saddozais ruled until their expulsion from power and subsequent replacement by Dost Mohammad Khan of the Barakzai.

He has been wrongly called 'Asadullah Khan' or 'Saadullah Khan' by some historians, but his real name was 'Saddu Khan'.

== Saddu In the eyes of the book 'Registered Sudhanoti' ==
Historian Yusuf Khan Abakhil Saduzai writes in his famous contemporary book Register Sudhnoti Page 40. that many authors have incorrectly written the date of birth of Malik Sadu, the ancestor of the Saduzai tribe. He writes that these historians have written the date of birth of Malik Sadu bin Umar as 1558 and have listed him as the sixteenth descendant of Qais Abdul Rashid, who was born in 575. This genealogy is out- lined as follows:

- 1. Qais Abdul Rashid,
- 2. Satarbin,
- 3. Khurushbun (Khairuddin),
- 4. Tarin,
- 5. Abdal,
- 6. Zakhtar,
- 7. Isa,
- 8. Zirk,
- 9. Popal,
- 10. Habib,
- 11. Bami,
- 12. Gani,
- 13. Bahlul,
- 14. Maroof Khan,
- 15. Umar,
- 16. Malik Saddo

Therefore, according to the writings of historian Sardar Suba Khan in the book "Maakhaz-e-Sudhnoti," the birth date of Malik Saddo bin Umar, the ancestor of the Sadozai, including Ahmad Shah Abdali, Afghan Nawab Jassi Khan Abdal Sadozai, and others, is 1078 AD.
