= Alaska Milk Corporation =

Filipino dairy products manufacturer

- Trade name: Alaska
- Formerly: Holland Milk Products, Inc. (1972–1994)
- Type: Joint venture (1972–94); Private (1994–95); Public (1995–2012); Subsidiary (since 2012)
- Traded as: PSE: AMC (1995–2012)
- Industry: Dairy
- Founded: January 23, 1972; 54 years ago
- Founder: Wilfred Uytengsu Sr.
- Headquarters: Paseo de Roxas, Makati, Metro Manila, Philippines
- Area served: Philippines
- Key people: Wilfred Steven Uytengsu Jr. (chairman); Tarang Gupta (managing director); Jan Wegenaar (operations director)
- Products: All-purpose cream; Coffee creamer; Condensed milk; Evaporated milk; Powdered milk; UHT milk
- Parent: FrieslandCampina
- Website: alaskamilk.com

Alaska Milk Corporation (AMC; formerly Holland Milk Products, Inc.), commonly known as Alaska (stylized in all caps), is a Philippine dairy company headquartered in Makati. It was founded in 1972 by Wilfred Uytengsu Sr. and George K. Young. The company is a subsidiary of Dutch dairy cooperative FrieslandCampina, which acquired control (98.1%) of the company from the founding Uytengsu family in 2012.

The company has no connection to the US state of Alaska.

== History ==
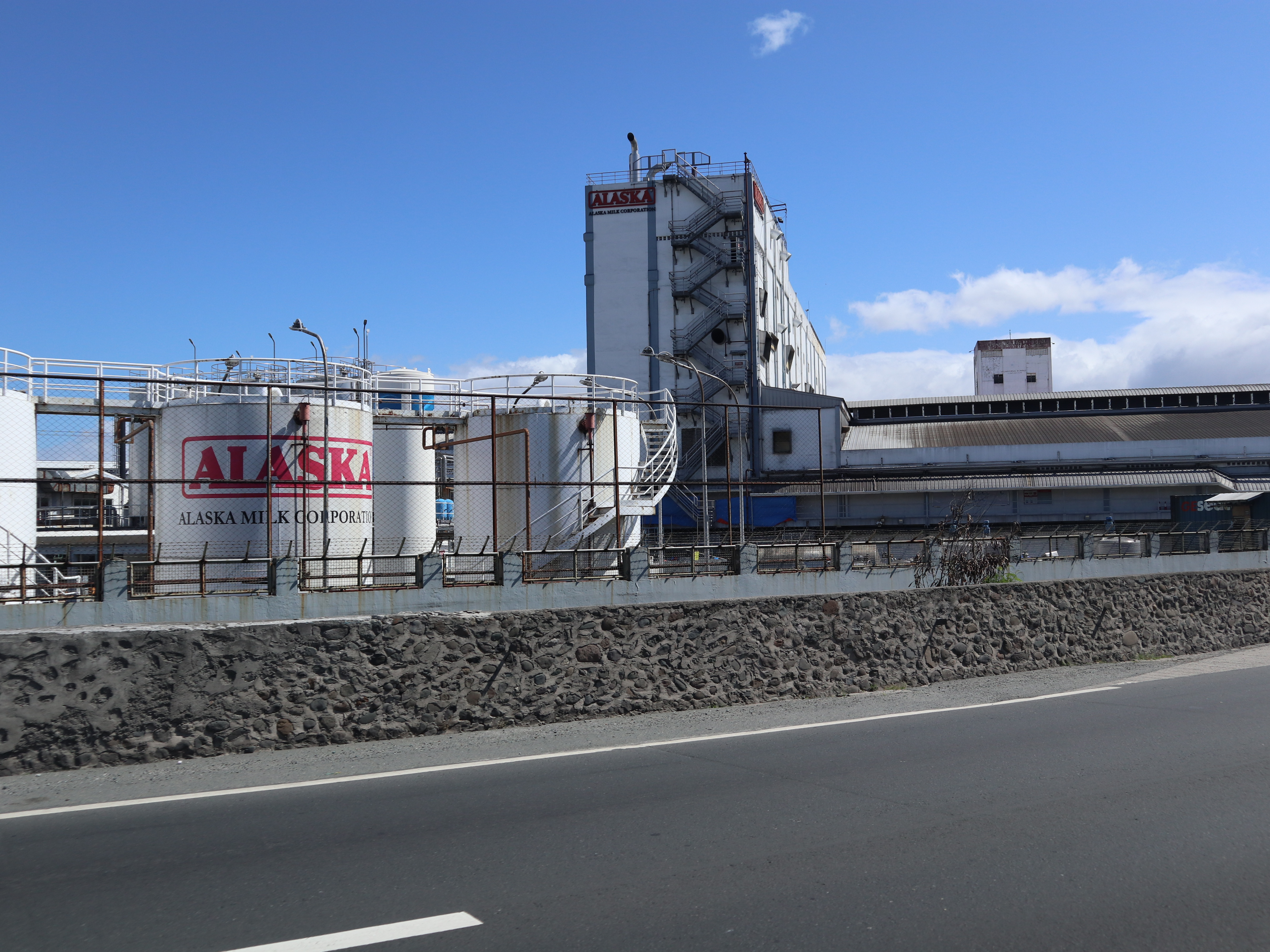
Alaska Milk Corporation facility in San Pedro, Laguna

Holland Milk Products, Inc. (HOMPI) was established in 1969 by Wilfred Uytengsu Sr. and George K. Young. It was a joint venture between General Milling Corporation (GMC) and Holland Canned Milk International B.V. (now FrieslandCampina), with HOMPI's first plant in San Pedro, Laguna commencing operations in September 1972. HOMPI initially manufactured canned liquid milk (evaporated milk and condensed milk). It eventually expanded to manufacture powdered milk and UHT milk. In 1975, Marikina Dairy Industries, Inc. became a shareholder of HOMPI, and by 1978 was itself acquired by HOMPI from the Australian Dairy Corporation.

In 1994, HOMPI was spun off from GMC and incorporated as Alaska Milk Corporation (AMC) under the control of Wilfred Uytengsu Sr. Shortly after its incorporation, AMC was listed in the Philippine Stock Exchange (PSE) in 1995.

Wilfred Steven Uytengsu Jr., eldest son of Wilfred Sr., assumed the position of president and CEO in 2007. The elder Uytengsu died in April 2010 at the age of 82.

In 2007, AMC acquired the canned milk business of Nestlé Philippines. The acquisition included the Alpine, Liberty, and Krem-Top trademarks, as well as the trademark licenses (until 2021) for Nestle's Carnation and Milkmaid brands.

In 2012, FrieslandCampina acquired majority control of AMC from the Uytengsu family. On November 5, 2012, AMC was delisted from the PSE after FrieslandCampina completed its tender offering for 98.1% ownership of AMC. Prior to this, FrieslandCampina held an 8.1% interest in AMC. Wilfred Steven Uytengsu Jr. remained as president and CEO until the end of 2018. Since 2019, Uytengsu serves as the Chairman of the company.

== Brands ==
Current

- Alaska
- Alpine
- Cow Bell
- Friso
- Krem-Top
- Liberty

Former

- Carnation (2007–2021, returned to Nestlé Philippines in 2021)
- Milkmaid (2007–2021, returned to Nestlé Philippines in 2021)

== Sports ==
=== Alaska Aces ===
The company owned the Philippine Basketball Association (PBA) team, the Alaska Aces, which it established in 1986. On February 16, 2022, AMC announced that the team will leave the PBA at the end of the 2021 Governors' Cup due to a directive by its parent company, FrieslandCampina. Alaska ended their final PBA tournament with a loss to the NLEX Road Warriors in the quarterfinals. Immediately following their final game on March 19, 2022, a brief ceremony was held to mark Alaska's departure from the PBA. On March 23, 2022, the PBA announced the sale of the Aces to Converge ICT.

=== Other sports sponsorships ===
- Alaska Tri-Aspire Philippines (triathlon team)
- Alaska Power Camp (basketball and football development camps)
- Alaska Ironkids Philippines (triathlon series)
- Alaska Football Cup (football tournament)
- Jr. NBA/Jr. WNBA Philippines (presenting partner)
