= Omoré =

Pakistani frozen dessert brand

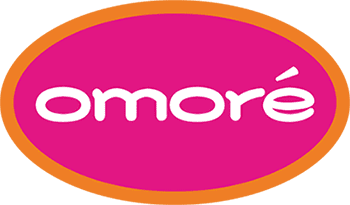
- Product type: Frozen dessert
- Current owner: FrieslandCampina Engro Pakistan
- Country: Pakistan
- Introduced: 2009; 17 years ago
- Markets: Pakistan
- Previous owners: Engro Corporation
- Tagline: WOW Bhara Bite
- Website: frieslandcampina.com/pk/brands/omore/

Omoré is a frozen dessert brand in Pakistan which is second biggest frozen dessert brand after Wall's in Pakistan. It is manufactured by FrieslandCampina Engro Pakistan, a subsidiary of Dutch multinational co-operative FrieslandCampina.

The brand was introduced in 2009. Omoré is also known for their slogan, Khushi Ki Bite, which has now changed in 2021, to WOW Bhara Bite.

The brand offers a wide variety of ice cream flavors, including traditional favorites like chocolate and vanilla, as well as more unique options like green tea and pistachio.

== History ==
Omoré was founded in 2009 by Engro Corporation.

== List of flavors ==
=== Flavors ===
- Chocolate
- Caramel
- Chocolate Chip
- Coffee
- Cookies and Cream
- Mango
- Strawberry
- Tutti Fruiti
- Vanilla
- Banana
