= FrieslandCampina Engro Pakistan =

Pakistani subsidiary of a foreign company

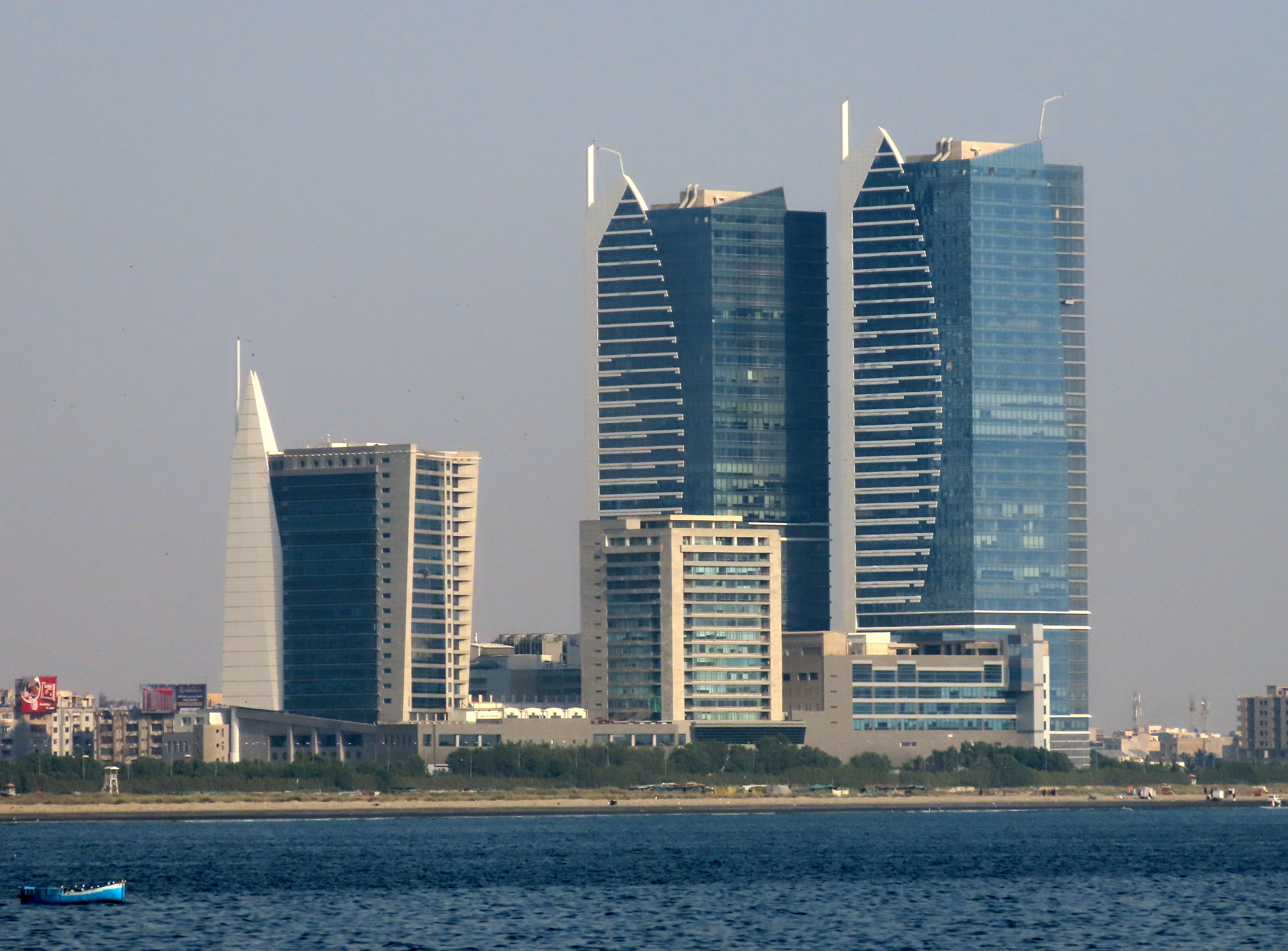
- FrieslandCampina Engro's headquarters, located in the Harbour Front Building (left tower) of Dolmen City.
- Formerly: Engro Foods (2005–2019)
- Company type: Public
- Traded as: PSX: FCEPL; KSE 100 component
- Industry: Dairy
- Founded: 2005; 21 years ago
- Headquarters: Karachi-75600, Pakistan
- Key people: Abdul Samad Dawood (chairman); Kashan Hasan (CEO)
- Products: Dairy Omung, Olpher's, Omoré, Tarang
- Revenue: ▲ Rs. 100.23 billion (US$360 million) (2023)
- Operating income: ▲ Rs. 6.117 billion (US$22 million) (2023)
- Net income: ▼ Rs. 1.509 billion (US$5.4 million) (2023)
- Total assets: ▲ Rs. 41.886 billion (US$150 million) (2023)
- Total equity: ▲ Rs. 14.176 billion (US$51 million) (2023)
- Owner: FrieslandCampina (51%); Engro Corporation (40%)
- Number of employees: 1310 (2023)
- Parent: Engro Corporation; FrieslandCampina
- Website: frieslandcampina.com/pk/
- Footnotes / references Financials as of 31 December 2023

FrieslandCampina Engro Pakistan Limited (FCEPL) is a Pakistani dairy products company which is a subsidiary of Dutch multinational cooperative FrieslandCampina. It is based in Karachi, Pakistan.

FrieslandCampina Engro Pakistan produces products such as dairy, ice cream, and frozen desserts. The company also operates a dairy farm.

== History ==
FrieslandCampina Engro Pakistan was founded as a subsidiary of Engro Chemicals Pakistan Limited in 2005. Its plant became operational in 2006.

In 2011, Engro Foods was listed on the Karachi Stock Exchange, following an initial public offering at a strike price of PKR 25. By 2012, it had a market capitalization greator than its parent company, Engro Corporation.

In 2016, Dutch dairy co-operative, Friesland Campina, acquired 51 percent stake in the company for US$450 million. At that time, it was still struggling to fully reach consumers due to its weak supply chain.

In July 2019, the company changed its name to FrieslandCampina Engro Pakistan.

== Brands ==
- Olper's
- Olper's Lite
- Omoré (frozen dessert)
- Dairy Omung
- Omung Lassi
- Tarang

== Plants ==
The company operates two processing plants in the following cities of Pakistan:

- Sukkur
- Sahiwal
