= Mai Kieu Lien =

Vietnamese businesswoman

Mai Kiều Liên (Chữ Hán:梅嬌蓮) (born 1. September 1953 in Paris, France;ancestral hometown in Vi Thanh, Hau Giang) is a Vietnamese businesswoman and currently Chief Executive Officer (CEO) of Vinamilk. She studied in the Soviet Union and has been working for Vinamilk since returning to Vietnam in 1976, holding leadership positions during much of the company's modernisation. She is the only Vietnamese manager in Forbes' "Asia's 50 Power Businesswomen" list and was described by the magazine to be dynamic and having played a key role in transforming Vinamilk not only "into one of Vietnam's most profitable brands but also a respected name across Asia".

She was the 60th wealthiest individual in Vietnam in terms of stock wealth in late 2012, holding stocks worth almost 200 billion VND (almost $10 million).

== Career ==
Mai Kiều Liên graduated from university in Moscow with a degree in meat and milk processing in 1976. She returned to Vietnam the same year and started working as an engineer responsible for condensed milk and yoghurt in Truong Tho factory of Vinamilk's predecessor. She was promoted in 1980 and again in 1982 to become an assistant to the director of Thong Nhat factory. In September 1983 she started a one-year management degree in Leningrad. She returned in June 1984 and became Vice Director in July. She became director in 1992, a position she is still holding. She was in the Central Committee of the Communist Party of Vietnam from 1996 to 2001. After the equitisation of Vinamilk she became chairwoman.

== Awards ==
- She honorably granted certain awards as below:

- In 2001: The Labour Medal II.

- In 2005: The “Hero of Labour in the novation period”.

- In 2006: The Labour Medal I. In the same year, she was awarded “Vietnam’s Entrepreneur of the Year” and “Outstanding Achievements in Science & Technology from 2001 to 2005” by Vietnamese Industry and Trade Department.

- In 2009: She won “Outstanding Businesswoman – Yellow Rose Award” by Vietnam Chamber of Commerce and Industry (VCCI)

- On 15 Jan, 2014: She was nominated “Number 1 CEO in Vietnam” by Council of Vietnamese economic experts and advisors.

- And she also honorably received other local and international awards:

- February 2012: “Top Asia’s 50 Most Powerful Businesswomen”, by Forbes Asia.

- May 2012: “Top 51 Excellent Businesswomen in Asia 2012”, by Corporate Governance Asia Journal.

- January 2013: “The 2012 Asian Excellence Recognition Award in Investor Relations”, by Corporate Governance Asia Journal.

- March 2013: “Top 50 for Achievement in Asia’s Businesswomen in The Mix”, by Forbes Asia (2nd time).

- January 2014: “The Best CEOs in Vietnam”, by the Business Review.

- March 2014: “Top Asia’s 50 Most Powerful Businesswomen”, by Forbes Asia (3rd time).

- September 2014: “The Asian Excellence Recognition Awards”, by Corporate Governance Asia Journal.

- January 2015: “Top 50 CEOs - Mark of Respect”, by the Business Review.

- February 2015: “The Cultural Businesswoman for National Building and Development”, by The Cultural Businessman Center.

- February 2015 : “Top Asia’s 50 Most Powerful Businesswomen”, by Forbes Asia (4th time).

- March 2015: “Businesswoman in ASEAN 2015”, by VCCI – Vietnamese Businesswoman Council.

- April 2015: “Businesswoman for Quality of Life”, by Ministry of Health – Foodstuff Safety Division.

- May 2015: “Asia Nikkei Award”, by Nikkei, a leading media corporation.

- November 2015: “New Zealand – ASEAN Award” – by New Zealand
