= Nounou =

Greek dairy brand

ΝΟΥΝΟΥ
- Product type: dairy products
- Current owner: FrieslandCampina
- Country: Greece
- Introduced: 1929
- Website: www.nounou.gr

NOUNOU (Greek: ΝΟΥΝΟΥ) is a Greek dairy brand, introduced in 1929, and owned by FrieslandCampina and its predecessors since 1983. It is headquartered in Marousi near Athens. Primarily known for sweetened condensed milk, a wide range of dairy products including fresh milk, powdered milk, cheese, yogurt and ice cream is currently sold under the ΝΟΥΝΟΥ brand.
