= FrieslandCampina Germany =

German dairy company

FrieslandCampina Germany GmbH
- Company type: Subsidiary of FrieslandCampina
- Industry: Food and drink, Dairy produce
- Founded: 1996
- Headquarters: Heilbronn
- Key people: Michael Feller, managing director
- Products: Dairy
- Number of employees: 2400 (2006)
- Website: Campina.de

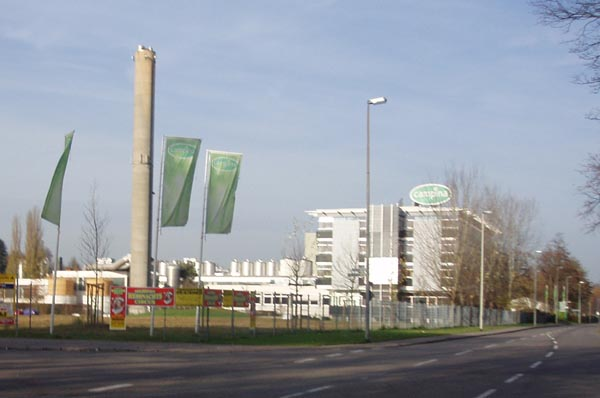
Campina headquarters in Heilbronn

FrieslandCampina Germany GmbH, former Campina GmbH, is a leading German dairy and subsidiary of the Dutch dairy cooperative FrieslandCampina. The company was formed in 1996 after the Stuttgart-based Südmilch AG was renamed.

== History ==
=== Milchversorgung Heilbronn GmbH (MVH) ===
MVH was founded in July 1924 in the town of Heilbronn. A follow-on company from the local "dairy department", MVH was owned by the town and a cooperative group of dairy buyers and sellers. In 1933 MVH acquired local dairies in the nearby towns of Ilsfeld, Bretzfeld, Neuenstadt am Kocher and Mainhardt. In 1968 a new dairy factory was built in the Neckargartach area of Heilbronn. At the time it was one of the most modern milk processing plants of its kind. Branch dairies were closed down and merged into the one factory.

=== Südmilch AG ===
In 1969, founded by Friedrich Wilhelm Schnitzler, MVH entered into an alliance with the interregional dairy Interessengemeinschaft Milch (Intermilch), Stuttgart-based Württ. Milchverwertung Südmilch AG (WMV) and Dauermilchwerk Hohenlohe-Franken GmbH from Künzelsau, to form the largest milk-processing company in Germany. In 1972 MVH merged with WMV to become Südmilch AG. The company went into receivership in 1993 following a scandal over government subventions and company investments in former East Germany. This resulted in the chairman going into hiding in South America and a takeover by the Dutch dairy cooperative Campina Melkunie.

Throughout the 1970s and 80s, Südmilch AG operated from a head office in north Stuttgart directly next to the tram stop Milchhof (which translates as 'milk yard'). The tram stop still exists to this day but only one of the former buildings still remains.

=== Campina GmbH ===
In 1996 the former Südmilch AG company was renamed Campina AG. There followed a string of mergers with other Campina Melkunie subsidiaries in Germany culminating in the new company Campina GmbH in 1999. At this point Campina closed down its head office in Stuttgart to centralise all operations in Heilbronn. In 2002 the company was renamed Campina GmbH & Co. KG. In 2000 the former cooperative of Milchwerke Köln-Wuppertal was merged into the company, along with former factors in Cologne, Wuppertal, Essen, Iserlohn and Lindlar. Other companies, formerly acquired by the mother company in the Netherlands, were merged under Campina in Heilbronn: Emzett, Kutel and Molkerei Strothmann. In September 2007 the company was named Campina GmbH, a German limited liability company.

== Key company data ==
Campina currently employs around 2200 people in Germany. Its works process around 1.4 billion litres of milk p.a. (Basis:March 2004). Turnover in 2005: €846 million (Campina worldwide: €3.569 billion). Since 2005, Campina GmbH has been headed by managing director Michael Feller, reporting into the Dutch Campina unit "Consumer Products Europe" (CPE).

== Criticism ==
The company came under fire from environmental campaigners in 2005 for sourcing milk from farmers who also grew genetically modified maize. Greenpeace demanded that the company ensures that farmers were not feeding corn to their dairy cows, a move already taken by competitive dairies. Chairman of German watchdog Foodwatch, renewed the attack on Campina in October 2007.

In October 2008 Campina reacted to public criticism by removing genetically modified ingredients from animal feeds used in the production of milk for its Landliebe brand. The company planned to start making "GM-Free" yogurts and desserts in April 2009.

== Selection of brands ==
- Alpa
- Axel Frischmilch
- Ayyo (Ayran)
- Fruttis
- Landliebe
- Mark Brandenburg
- Milbona
- Milfina
- Optiwell
- Puddis
- Südmilch
- Tuffi
- Yazoo

== General references (German) ==
- Kultur und Wirtschaftschronik Heilbronn, J. Bühn publishing house, Munich
- Volker Grub: Das gerichtliche Vergleichsverfahren der Südmilch-AG (The court receivership of Südmilch AG), Brugger, Schöngeising 1998, ISBN 3-9805758-2-9
- Martin Born: Landliebe, Filz und Betrug. Die Südmilchpleite. (Landliebe, sleaze and corruption. The collapse of Südmilch), Campus publishing, Frankfurt 1996, ISBN 3-593-35484-5
