= FrieslandCampina =

Dutch multinational dairy cooperative

Royal FrieslandCampina N.V.
- Type: Private
- Industry: Dairy
- Predecessors: Friesland Foods; Campina
- Founded: 30 December 2008; 17 years ago
- Headquarters: Amersfoort, Netherlands
- Area served: Worldwide
- Key people: Jan Derck van Karnebeek (CEO)
- Revenue: ▼€12.92 billion (2024)
- Operating income: ▲€527 million (2024)
- Net income: ▲€321 million (2024)
- Total assets: ▲€9.203 billion (2024)
- Total equity: ▲€3.589 billion (2024)
- Number of employees: ▼19,576 FTE (2024)
- Parent: Zuivelcoöperatie FrieslandCampina U.A.
- Subsidiaries: Alaska Milk Corporation; FrieslandCampina Engro Pakistan; Dutch Lady Milk Industries
- Website: frieslandcampina.com

Royal FrieslandCampina N.V. is a Dutch multinational dairy cooperative which is based in Amersfoort, Netherlands. It is the result of a merger between Friesland Foods and Campina on 30 December 2008. The European Commission approved the merger on 17 December 2008, on the condition that the new company divest some activities by the Ministry of the Interior and Kingdom.

It is one of the world's largest dairy co-operative and one of the top 5 dairy companies in the world with annual revenue of close to 13 billion euros (2024). FrieslandCampina has branch offices in 32 countries and employs a total of 19,576 people.

Its main brands are Friesche Vlag (or Frisian Flag in Indonesian market), Chocomel / CeCemel, Fristi, Frico, Friso, Dutch Lady, Milner, Campina, Landliebe, Optimel, Mona, Parrano, Lattiz, Debic, Olpers, Peak, Three Crowns and "Mix'it". FrieslandCampina's products are sold in more than 100 countries.

== History ==
Royal FrieslandCampina is organized as a cooperative, with roots going back to 1871. It has grown through mergers and takeovers.

In late 1997, four Dutch dairy cooperatives merged to form Friesland Coberco Dairy Food. In June 2004, Queen Beatrix of the Netherlands granted FCDF Royal status. FCDF renamed itself Royal Friesland Foods.

Campina was created in 1989 by the merger of two regional dairy cooperatives, Melkunie Holland and DMV Campina. After this merger the company was named Campina Melkunie until it dropped the Melkunie part of the name in 2001.

In 2004, Campina and Arla Foods, a Danish dairy cooperative, announced plans for a merger, but the plan was canceled in April 2005 for undisclosed reasons although plans for other forms of cooperation are still said to be under consideration.

On 19 December 2007, Campina and Friesland Foods announced that the companies were exploring the possibility of a merger. The EU approved the merger of the two cooperatives provided that they sold off certain cheese and dairy drink divisions.

FrieslandCampina's product range consists of milk, baby and infant food, dairy drinks, yoghurts, desserts, cheese, butter, cream, milk powder and ingredients from dairy. The fruit juices and fruit drinks, organized under the company name Riedel, were sold in 2017.

After announcing that it would merge with the smaller Belgian cooperative Milcobel in December 2024, the European Commission approved the transaction in October of the following year. On January 1, 2026, the transaction became effective.

== Longevity Brand ==
In Vietnam, the U.S. and Canada the company is well known for its canned condensed milk product, Sữa Ông Thọ (Longevity Brand condensed milk), popularly used in Vietnamese iced coffee with milk (Cà phê sữa đá) drinks, and in various other Vietnamese desserts. Sữa Ông Thọ was mass-produced in the Saigon-Biên Hòa area and widely consumed in Vietnam, produced by Friesland Foods prior 1975. It was used in coffee, mixed with hot water to produce hot milk for babies and young children to drink (since fresh milk had to be imported and were thus expensive), dipped with French bread (Bánh mì) or in other dessert applications. After the 1975 Fall of Saigon, the factories manufacturing Sữa Ông Thọ, along with all other commercial and private properties were collectivized by the communists, and the facilities came under the state company Vinamilk, who continued to produce Sữa Ông Thọ condensed milk under the same name and used domestically and elsewhere in Indochina.

Friesland Foods continued production of Sữa Ông Thọ – Longevity Brand after 1975 in the U.S. and Canada for the North American market, especially catering to Overseas Vietnamese consumers, and increasingly to Western consumers as the popularity of Vietnamese coffee and cuisine in general, increases. In North America, Longevity Brand – Sữa Ông Thọ is widely available in Asian supermarkets, and increasingly in conventional supermarkets.

== Brand names ==
Cans of iced coffee from the Barista Coffee Co. brand of FrieslandCampina

In Greece the company is known through the Nounou brand (Greek: Νουνου, ΝΟΥΝΟΥ).

In Indonesia, the company is known through the Frisian Flag brand.

In Brunei, Hong Kong, Japan, Malaysia, the Philippines, Singapore and Vietnam, the dairy product for adult market is known through the Dutch Lady brand.

In Thailand, the company is known through the Foremost brand.

In Nigeria the company is known through the PEAK MILK brand.

Other brands include Yazoo milkshakes.

Brands with health benefit claims:

- Campina Optimel (Netherlands, Hong Kong): differentiated into age groups of +50s, +60s and +70s
- Campina Optiwell (Germany)
- Campina Vifit (Germany and Netherlands)
- Campina Fruttis (Russia)
- Campina Betagen (Thailand) – joint venture with Thai Advanced Food

== Acquisitions (Campina) ==
- Comelco NV in Belgium (1989)
- Deltown Specialities in the United States (1989)
- Menken consumptiemelk activiteiten (Netherlands) (1997)
- Menken Dairy Food (Netherlands) (1997)
- Menken Polderland (Netherlands) (1997)
- Parmalat Thailand (Thailand) (2003)
- Napolact (Romania) (2004)
- Innovatech Argentina (Argentina) (2005)
- Alaska Milk Corporation (Philippines) (2012)
- Engro Foods Limited (Pakistan) 2016
- Friso (Philippines) (2016)

In Germany, now Campina GmbH

- Südmilch AG, 1993
- Kutel, 1998
- Emzett, 1999
- Strothmann
