= PP-2 Attock-II =

Constituency of the Punjabi Provincial Legislature, Pakistan

- Provincial constituency for the Provincial Assembly of Punjab
- Region: Hasan Abdal Tehsil and Fateh Jang Tehsil (partly) including Fateh Jang of Attock District

Current constituency
- Created from: PP-17 Attock-III

PP-2 Attock-II (پی پی-2، اٹک-2) is a Constituency of Provincial Assembly of Punjab.

== General elections 2024 ==
Provincial election 2024: PP-2 Attock-II
Party	Candidate	Votes	%	±%
Independent	Sardar Mohamood Ali Khan (Note: Filed nomination papers as PTI candidate but ECP allowed him to run as an Independent)	36,149	26.34	
PML(N)	Iftekhar Ahmed Khan	35,959	26.20	
TLP	Ayaz Khan	22,286	16.24	
PPP	Zulfiqar Hayat Khan	18,690	13.62	
Independent	Jhangir Ali Khan	13,244	9.65	
JI	Awais Aslam Mirza	4,101	2.99	
PRHP	Zia Muhammad	2,954	2.15	
Others	Others (ten candidates)	3,850	2.81	
Turnout		140,323	57.73	
Total valid votes		137,233	97.80	
Rejected ballots		3,090	2.20	
Majority		190	0.14	
Registered electors		243,061		
hold				

== General election 2018 ==
In 2018 Pakistani general election, Tahir Sadik a ticket holder of PTI won PP-3 Attock-III election by taking 45,965 votes.

Provincial election 2018: PP-3 Attock-III
Party	Candidate	Votes	%	±%
PTI	Tahir Sadik	62,391	45.46	
PML(N)	Asif Ali Malik	31,089	22.65	
PPP	Muhammad Riaz Khan	25,341	18.47	
TLP	Rahat Ali Khan	13,606	9.92	
MMA	Taj ud Din Rabani	3,629	2.64	
Others	Others (two candidates)	1,178	0.86	
Turnout		140,067	62.48	
Total valid votes		137,234	97.98	
Rejected ballots		2,833	2.02	
Majority		31,302	22.81	
Registered electors		224,163		

== General election 2013 ==
Provincial election 2013: PP-17 Attock-III
Party	Candidate	Votes	%	±%
PML(N)	Muhammad Shawez Khan	40,894	30.25	
Independent	Malik Jamshaid Iltaf	39,622	29.31	
PPP	Mohammad Riaz Khan	24,282	17.96	
PTI	Muhammad Akbar Khan	22,747	16.83	
JI	Iqbal Khan	4,688	3.47	
Others	Others (six candidates)	2,956	2.18	
Turnout		139,657	63.28	
Total valid votes		135,189	96.80	
Rejected ballots		4,468	3.20	
Majority		1,272	0.94	
Registered electors		220,703		

== General election 2008 ==
Provincial election 2008: PP-17 Attock-III
Party	Candidate	Votes	%	±%
PML(Q)	Sher Ali Khan	41,409	38.48	
PPP	Haji Ishtaq Ahmed Khan	40,691	37.81	
PML(N)	Sardar Muhammad Ali	24,305	22.59	
MMA	Maulana Shahabuddin Ahmed Qureshi	1,089	1.01	
Independent	Asad Zaman Khan	113	0.11	
Turnout		110,664	59.40	
Total valid votes		107,607	97.24	
Rejected ballots		3,057	2.76	
Majority		718	0.67	
Registered electors		186,301		

== See also ==
- PP-1 Attock-I
- PP-3 Attock-III
