= Hakmeen Khan =

Pakistani politician (died 2019)

Malik Hakmeen Khan (died 4 January 2019) was a Punjabi Muslim Pakistani politician who was a founder of the Pakistan Peoples Party. In the year 1970, he contested the Punjab assembly elections from Campbellpur 2 (present-day Attock) and won on the PPP Ticket.

In 1977 he again contested the elections and retained his seat. Later on, he was part of the 1988 elections and was victorious. He was the only man from Attock to have held MPA three consecutive times. A close aide to Zulfikar Ali Bhutto, Hakmeen Khan held 5 different portfolios including housing, physical planning, auqaf, food, and jail.

In 1994, he was declared as Senator by Benazir Bhutto. He was amongst the very few politicians, who remained loyal to Pakistan Peoples Party till his last breath. Known as a PPP Jiyala, he was the only one from his native Attock to have stood by the party.

Malik Hakmeen Khan was one of the closest working members of PPP.

Hakmeen Khan died on 4 January 2019, and his funeral was attended by nearly 25,000 people in his native village Sheen Bagh Attock.
