= Shadi Khan (village) =

- Village
- Location within Pakistan
- Coordinates: 33°55′18″N 72°22′39″E
- Country: Pakistan
- Province: Punjab
- District: Attock
- Tehsil: Hazro
- Region: Chhachh
- Time zone: UTC+5 (PST)

Shadi Khan is a village in Chach Valley of Attock District in Punjab Province of Pakistan.

== Suicide bombing ==
On 16 August 2015, the interior minister of Punjab, Shuja Khanzada, and at least 22 other people were killed in a suicide attack on the minister's political office in Shadi Khan. The militant group Lashkar-e-Jhangvi (LeJ) claimed responsibility for the attack.
