= Yazoo (drink) =

Milk-based flavoured drink

- Type: Flavoured drink
- Manufacturer: FrieslandCampina
- Origin: Belgium
- Introduced: 1960s
- Flavour: Banana, Chocolate, Strawberry and Vanilla
- Website: yazoo.co.uk

Yazoo is a bottled milk-based flavoured drink, produced by FrieslandCampina and sold in Belgium, France, the United Kingdom and Ireland. Over eighty million bottles of Yazoo are sold annually.

== Contents ==
Yazoo is available in four flavours; banana, chocolate, strawberry and vanilla. Vanilla was introduced in 2014, as a limited edition flavour. It was announced that the Vanilla flavor and other flavours would be staying. Bottle sizes range from 200 ml, 400 ml, and one litre.

A new "No Added Sugar" range was introduced in 2016, in Strawberry, Banana and Toffee flavours. The following year, Chocolate was added to this range. It was announced in November 2018 the range was to be rebranded as Yazoo Kids.

In April 2018, a limited edition Choc Mint flavour was introduced (staying in the United Kingdom), following the results of a vote from consumers about the flavour they would most like to try as a milk drink. In April 2019, a limited edition Choc Caramel flavour was introduced replacing the Choc Mint flavour. FrieslandCampina said that Choc Mint had generated £1 million within five months of launch, and that the "target audience of sixteen to twenty four year olds are always looking for new flavours to try."

The bottles of 2015 were designed by Steve Trotman. The smaller bottles usually have transparent straws glued to the side, in a plastic wrapper. The larger bottles feature a tearaway tag on the label for easy recycling.

Yazoo is suitable for vegetarians; it is a source of calcium, protein, B_{2} and B_{12}. It is low in fat and contains no artificial sweeteners, colours or preservatives.

== Advertising ==
Advertisements previously featured a green dinosaur mascot named Dino, similar to Nesquik's Quicky the Rabbit. The new line of bottles have the phrase, "Milk shaken up" on the label.
