= Campina (company) =

Dutch dairy cooperative

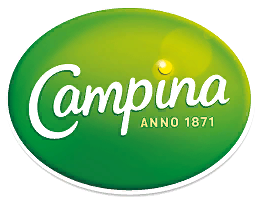
- Company type: Private/Cooperative
- Industry: Dairy
- Founded: 1979; 47 years ago
- Fate: Merged with Friesland Foods
- Headquarters: Zaltbommel, Netherlands
- Key people: Justinus Sanders (CEO)
- Products: Milk, cheese, yogurt
- Revenue: €4 billion (2007)
- Number of employees: 7,099
- Parent: FrieslandCampina
- Website: campina.nl

Campina is a Dutch dairy cooperative. Main brands include Campina and Mona. In 2008, it merged with Royal Friesland Foods. The name of the new company is FrieslandCampina.

The company history starts with many village cooperatives that gradually merged into each other and thus became big regional companies. Campina in its current form was created in 1989 by the merge of two of such regional cooperatives, Melkunie Holland and DMV Campina. After this merger the company was named Campina Melkunie until it dropped the Melkunie part in 2001.

In 2004, Campina and Arla, a Danish dairy cooperative, announced their plan to merge, however this plan was disbanded in April 2005 for undisclosed reasons although plans for other forms of cooperation would still be considered.

On 19 December 2007, Campina and Friesland Foods announced that the companies are exploring the possibility to merge. The EU approved the merger if the two cooperatives sell certain cheese and dairy drink divisions.

== Brands with Health Benefit Claims ==
- Campina Optimel (Netherlands)
- Campina Optiwell (Germany)
- Campina Vifit (Germany, Netherlands)
- Campina Fruttis (Russia)
- Campina Betagen (Thailand) – joint venture with Thai Advanced Food

== Acquisitions ==
- Comelco NV in (Belgium) 1989
- Deltown Specialities in (United States) 1989
- Menken consumptiemelk activiteiten (Netherlands) 1997
- Menken Dairy Food (Netherlands) 1997
- Menken Polderland (Netherlands) 1997
- Parmalat Thailand (Thailand) 2003
- Innovatech Argentina (Argentina) 2005

In Germany, now Campina GmbH

- Südmilch AG, 1993
- Kutel, 1998
- Emzett, 1999
- Strothmann
