= Campinho Maciel =

Portuguese footballer (born 1986)

Campinho
Personal information
- Full name: Jorge Fernando Barroso Maciel
- Date of birth: 12 November 1986 (age 39)
- Place of birth: Vila Cova, Portugal
- Height: 1.84 m (6 ft 0 in)
- Position: Centre back

Youth career
- 1999–2000: Marca
- 2000–2003: Marinhas
- 2003–2005: Varzim

Senior career*
Years	Team	Apps	(Gls)
2005–2011	Varzim	41	(0)
2008–2009	→ Ribeirão (loan)	16	(0)
2011–2012	Mirandela	25	(1)
2012–2013	Académico Viseu	29	(2)
2013–2014	Boavista	9	(0)
2014–2015	Marinhas	30	(2)
- * Club domestic league appearances and goals as of 29 January 2017

Jorge Fernando Barroso Maciel (born 12 November 1986 in Vila Cova, Barcelos), known as Campinho, is a Portuguese professional footballer who plays as a central defender.
