= Shadi Khan =

Governor of Akbar the Great in Kandahar (17th century)

Shadi Khan was the governor of Mughal emperor Akbar at Kandahar, Afghanistan, at the start of the 17th century. In 1621, more than a decade after Akbar's death, Shadi Khan, with the help of the Abdali Pashtun tribe and opposed by Saddu Khan, allied with Abbas I of Persia, who had lost Kandahar in 1594 and was intriguing for its recovery.
