= Muslim Town Flyover =

Muslim Town Flyover مسلم ٹاؤن سر پل
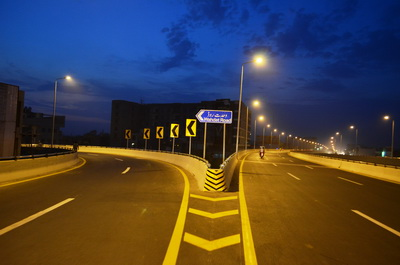
- Muslim Town Flyover

Location
- Lahore, Punjab, Pakistan
- Coordinates: 31.5210°N 74.3246°E
- Roads at junction: Ferozepur Road; Wahdat Road; Canal Bank Road

Construction
- Type: Flyover
- Constructed: by NLC & Habib Construction Services
- Opened: 29 April 2012

Muslim Town Flyover (Urdu: مسلم ٹاؤن) is a flyover and interchange between Ferozepur Road, Wahdat Road along Canal Bank Road in Lahore, Pakistan. Muslim Town Flyover is the longest flyover of Pakistan with a length of about 2.6 km (1.6 mi).
