= Friesland Foods =

Dutch dairy company

Koninklijke Friesland Foods N.V.
- Type: Cooperative
- Industry: Food processing; Dairy
- Founded: 16 July 1879; 147 years ago
- Defunct: 30 December 2008; 17 years ago
- Fate: Merged with Campina
- Successor: FrieslandCampina
- Headquarters: Meppel, Netherlands
- Area served: Worldwide
- Revenue: €5.075 billion (2007)
- Number of employees: 14,582

Royal Friesland Foods (Koninklijke Friesland Foods N.V.) was a Dutch company that developed, produced and sold branded dairy products and fruit-based drinks. Royal Friesland Foods had a strong presence in Western Europe, Central Europe, West Africa and Southeast Asia.

On 30 December 2008, Friesland Foods merged with Campina, under the new name of FrieslandCampina. The process was announced in December 2007. The EU conditioned the merger to the sale of certain cheese and dairy drink divisions by both companies.

== Overview ==
Royal Friesland Foods is organized as a cooperative, with roots going back to 1879. It has grown through mergers and takeovers, the most significant of which occurred in late 1997, when four Dutch dairy cooperatives joined to create the business in its current form.

In December 2001, KFF NV acquired the Drinks & Dairy division of Numico including the brands Chocomel/Cécémel, Fristi and Extran.

Royal Friesland Foods gained its current name in June 2004 after Queen Beatrix of the Netherlands granted it the Royal status ("Koninklijk" in Dutch) in honour of its 125th anniversary. Prior to that, the company was known as Friesland Coberco Dairy Foods.

== 2008 baby milk scandal ==
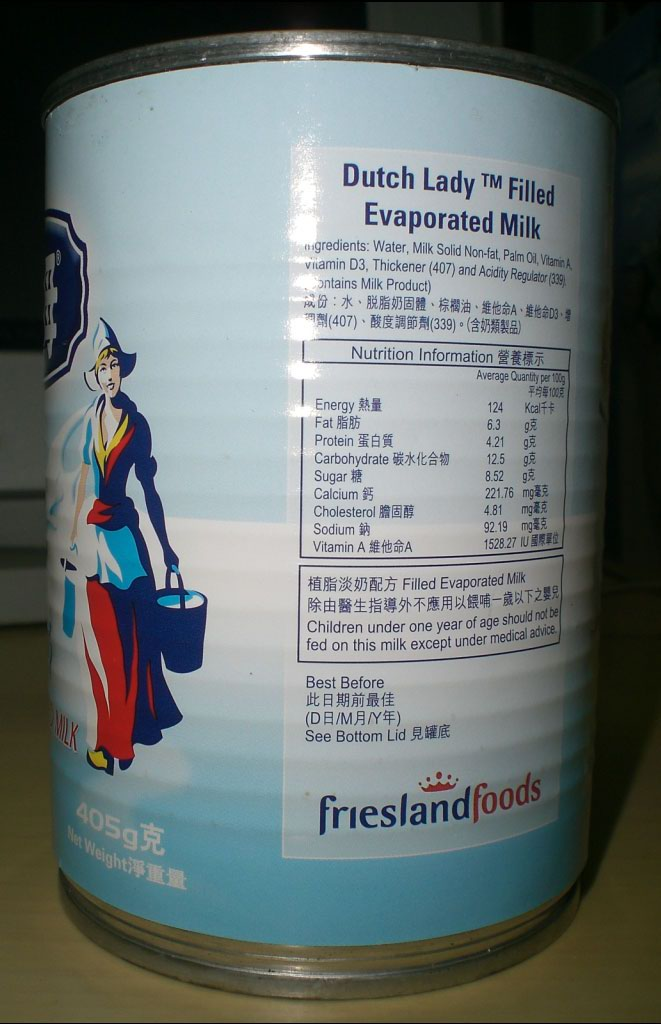
HK Filled Evaporated Milk Dutch Lady Friesland Foods

In September 2008, the testing of Agri-Food and Veterinary Authority of Singapore (AVA) found that the "Dutch Lady" brand of strawberry flavoured milk manufactured in China to be contaminated with melamine. This product was recalled and destroyed. Friesland Foods recalled all of its plastic-bottled milk in Hong Kong and Macau.
