= Sectarian violence in Pakistan =

- Part of the insurgency in Khyber Pakhtunkhwa, the insurgency in Balochistan, the insurgency in Sindh, the MQM militancy, the war on terror and Terrorism in Pakistan
Date	Since 15th August 1947 (79 years, 3 months and 3 days)
Location	Pakistan (with spillovers to India and Iran)
Result	Ongoing (low-level insurgency); Some success in reduction of killings and attacks on civilians; Intermittent series of multilateral talks underway with groups, especially Tehrik-i-Taliban Pakistan; 2022 ceasefire ended as of 2023 between Government of Pakistan and Pakistani Taliban; The Pakistani Taliban announced re-insurgency in Pakistan and a series of attacks

Combatants
Pakistan; Ministry of Defence; Pakistan Armed Forces; Army; Air Force; Navy; Ministry of Interior; Civil Armed Forces; Pakistan Levies; Frontier Corps; Pakistan Rangers; PCG; GBS; Federal Constabulary; Pakistan Police; CTD; Balochistan Levies; Pakistani intelligence community; NACTA; ISI; MI; IB; FIA; SB; Victims of terror: Shia Muslims (main victims); Anti-sectarianist Sunni Muslims; Ahmadiyya; Hindus; Christians; Sikhs; Other ethnic and religious communities in Pakistan	Terrorist & extremist groups; Tehrik-i-Taliban Pakistan; TNSM; TJP; TGG; HGBG; Fedayeen al-Islam (until 2010); JFM; Punjabi Taliban (until 2014); Ansar ul-Mujahideen; Jamaat-ul-Ahrar; Ahrar-ul-Hind; TIP (Note: lost territories in 2015; active until 2017 in Waziristan); IJU (until 2025); TLP (2016 – 2025); Lashkar-e-Omar (until 2002); HNG (until 2008); TGG (until 2017); Lashkar-e-Islam; JuA (until 2020); Ahrar-ul-Hind (until 2014); Jaysh al-Adl (Note: Against Iran since 2012 & Pakistan since 2024); Al-Qaeda; AQIS; Ansar Al-Furqan; Abdullah Azzam Brigade (until 2015); ASP; SSP (until 2018); ASWJ (until 2021); LeJ (until 2024); Baloch separatists: Baloch Raaji Aajoi Sangar; BLA; Majeed Brigade; Fateh Squad; BLF; LeB (inactive); BLUF (2009-2010); BSO (Azad) (inactive); BNA (2022–23); BRA (2006–22); UBA (2013–22); Other Baloch Separatist groups; IS-aligned groups: IMU (until 2015); Jundallah (until 2014); Tehreek-e-Khilafat (from 2014); IS–KP (from 2015); IS–PP; Shia Groups: Tehreek-e-Jafaria; SMP; Ansar-ul-Hussain; Khatam-ul-Anbia; Supported by: Liwa Zainabiyoun (indirectly); Muhajir nationalist groups: (until 2025): MQM-L (until 2016); Good Friends; Sector Commanders (until 2016); Nadeem Commando (1990–96); Faheem Commando (1990–95); (no border) MQM-H (until 1992); Sindhudesh groups: Baloch Raaji Aajoi Sangar; SRA; SLA; SPA; JSQM; JSMM

Strength
Pakistan 600,000 total troops; 200,000 Pakistani troops in KPK; 145,000 Pakistani troops in Balochistan; Unknown no. of air squadrons of fighter jets, including JF-17 and F-16 jets; ~80,000 Frontier Corpsmen	~25,000 TTP militia; ~2,000 LeI militia; ~1,000 TNSM militia; 300–3,000 al-Qaeda militants; ISIL; Jundallah: 12,000–20,000 (disputed); IMU: 500–1,000

Casualties and losses
5,740 soldiers and LEAs killed (SATP; Feb. 2025); 9,431 soldiers and LEAs killed, 14,583 wounded (CWP; Aug. 2021)	Total unknown
- Since 1947, thousands of Shia were killed in Pakistan by terrorist and militant groups

Sectarian violence in Pakistan refers to violence directed against people and places in Pakistan motivated by antagonism toward the target's religious sect. As many as 4,000 Shia (a Muslim minority group) were estimated to have been killed in sectarian attacks in Pakistan between 1987 and 2007, and thousands more Shia have been killed by Salafi extremists from 2008 to 2014, according to Human Rights Watch (HRW). Sunnis (the largest Muslim sect), Sufis and Barelvis (Note: The CIA Factbook estimates Sunnis make up 85-90% of the Muslim population and Shia 10-15%.) have also suffered from some sectarian violence, with attacks on religious shrines killing hundreds of (usually Bareelvi) worshippers by more orthodox Sunnis who believe shrine culture to be idolatrous, and some Deobandi leaders have also been assassinated. Pakistani minority religious groups, including Hindus, Ahmadis, and Christians, had faced "unprecedented insecurity and persecution" from 2011 to 2012, according to Human Rights Watch. One significant aspect of the attacks in Pakistan was that militants/insurgents often target their victims' places of worship during prayers or religious services in order to maximize fatalities and to "emphasize the religious dimensions of their attack".

Among those blamed for the sectarian violence in the country are mainly Deobandi militant groups, such as the Sipah-e-Sahaba Pakistan (SSP), Lashkar-e-Jhangvi (LeJ), the Tehrik-i-Taliban Pakistan (TTP), and also the Jundallah (an affiliate of the Islamic State of Iraq and the Levant). Tehrik-i-Taliban Pakistan "has claimed responsibility for most of the attacks" on Shia according to Human Rights Watch. In recent years the Barelvi group Tehreek-e-Labbaik Pakistan has been credited with instigating much violence. Salafi militant groups (such as the Islamic State and Al-Qaeda) are also blamed for attacks on Shias, Barelvis and Sufis. As of 2022, violent sectarian groups have continued to expand their influence across the country, with less violence from SSP and LeJ, but more from Tehreek-e-Labbaik and the Islamic State, and limited response from the state to counter their large-scale attacks. Sectarian violence killed at least 130 people in the northwest of Pakistan over just ten days in November 2024

Sectarian Violence in Pakistan: 1989-2018

- incidents
- killed

== Terminology ==
Sectarian refers to sects or religious groups in this article. Although "Sectarianism" can refer to conflict between ethnic, political and cultural as well as religious groups, and there is sometimes an overlap between religious and ethnic groups and fights (according to the U.S. Library of Congress, violence is often based on "different social, political, and economic statuses that correlate with religion" rather than religious doctrine; the Pakistan military, for example, has allegedly used the Deobandi sectarian group Lashkar-e-Jhangvi "as a proxy to counter Baloch separatist militants"), in the context of Pakistan, sectarian usually refers to sects or religious groups. (Note: example of distinguishing between sectarian and ethnic violence: "As discussed earlier, the 9/11 incident is considered as an important landmark in a strategic policy shift that pushed Pakistan to face a historically severe wave of terrorism. It was not just sectarian or ethnic terrorism but stretched out to target military barracks, defence installations, ...") (For ethnic and regional separatist violence in Pakistan, see Separatist movements of Pakistan.)

Sectarian violence is not exclusively non-governmental. In literature on "sectarian groups" in Pakistan, the groups referred to are non-governmental, but governmental actors have been accused of sectarianism and aiding sectarian groups. Police have been accused of refusing to prevent sectarian acts, of refusing "to charge persons who commit them", (Note: "Three sources reported word for word that 'discriminatory religious legislation has encouraged an atmosphere of religious intolerance, which has led to acts of violence directed against minority Muslim sects, as well as against Christians, Hindus, and members of Muslim offshoot sects such as Ahmadis and Zikris' (Country Reports 1997, 1998; IND Mar. 1999, 29; Annual Report on International Religious Freedom for 1999 9 Sept. 1999). The 9 September 1999 US Department of State publication Annual Report on International Religious Freedom for 1999 added that "police at times refuse to prevent such actions or to charge persons who commit them." see also: Baloch, Kiyya (12 November 2014). "Who Is Responsible for Persecuting Pakistan's Minorities? Islamists in Balochistan are targeting minorities, yet NGOs are beginning to blame the government too". The Diplomat.) and government officials have been accused of helping the formation of sectarian terror groups. (For example General Muhammad Zia-ul-Haq indirectly helped to create Sipah-e-Sahaba Pakistan) (Note: "In 1985, however, in an effort to promote Sunni orthodoxy, Zia’s regime backed the creation in Jhang of a Deobandi group called Sipahe-Sahaba Pakistan (SSP)") though this doesn't mean that SSP didn't attempt to kill other government officials (Prime Minister Nawaz Sharif and Punjab police investigating SSP crimes) some years later. (Note: "Along with attacking Shias, Lashkar-e-Jhangvi also assassinated or threatened Punjab police investigating its crimes. As the sectarian outfit challenged the state’s writ in Punjab, the country’s largest province and Prime Minister Nawaz Sharif’s ... . Those efforts picked up after Lashkar-e-Jhangvi tried to assassinate Sharif in January 1999.) And if sectarian violence includes forced disappearances, (Note: for example "according to a Shia political leader, the number of [Shia] people missing [because of "enforced disappearances" by the security services] has decreased to fewer than 50 from a high of several hundred; some are believed to have died in detention")) then police in Pakistan have also been accused of sectarian violence.

Sectarian violence is often, but not necessarily, terroristic (attacks on unarmed civilians) in Pakistan, but there have also been violence between armed sectarians. (Note: An example being a July 1987 fight in Parachinar, where conservative Sunni Mujahideen attacked local Shia armed with locally made automatic rifles. Reportedly 52 Shia and 120 Sunni attackers lost their lives in several days of fighting.)

== Religions and sects ==
=== Muslims ===
Approximately 97% of Pakistanis are either Sunni or Shia Muslims, the two largest religious groups in Pakistan. In Pakistan as worldwide, Shia Islam constitutes a minority and Sunni a majority of Muslims. Estimates of the size of these groups vary—adherents of Shi'a Islam in Pakistan are thought to make up between 15 and 20% of the population, (roughly 30 million), and Sunni between 70 and 75%, (according experts such as the Library of Congress, Pew Research Center, Oxford University, the CIA World Factbook). While the overwhelming majority of Shia in Pakistan (and around the world) are "Twelver" Shia (aka Asna-e-Ashari), there are smaller Shi'i sects, such as varieties of Ismaili.

==== Barelvi and Deobandi Sunni Muslims ====
There are two major Sunni sects in Pakistan, the Barelvi movement and Deobandi movement. Statistics regarding Pakistan's sects and sub-sects have been called "tenuous", but estimates of the sizes of the two groups give a slight majority of Pakistan's population to followers of the Barelvi school, while 15–25% are thought to follow the Deobandi school of jurisprudence.

=== Smaller Muslim sects ===
==== Ahmadis ====
Somewhere between 0.22% (official figure) and 2.2% (highest estimate) of Pakistan's population follow the Ahmadiyya sect, (Note: The 1998 Pakistani census states that there are 291,000 (0.22%) Ahmadis in Pakistan. However, the Ahmadiyya Muslim Community has boycotted the census since 1974 which renders official Pakistani figures to be inaccurate. Independent groups have estimated the Pakistani Ahmadiyya population to be somewhere between 2 million and 5 million out of a population of about 220 million. See: over 2 million: Immigration and Refugee Board of Canada; 3 million: International Federation for Human Rights: 3–4 million: Commission on International Religious Freedom: 4.910.000: James Minahan: Encyclopedia of the stateless nations.) who, though they consider themselves Muslims, were officially designated 'non-Muslims' by a 1974 constitutional amendment, due to pressure from Sunni revivalist and extremist groups.

==== Zikris ====
Like Ahmadis, and unlike orthodox Muslims, Zikris believe the Mahdi of Islam has already arrived. Zikris, an Islamic sect of less than one million, originally from the sparsely populated and poor region of Balochistan in western Pakistan, have been described as "a minority Muslim group", but also a "Muslim offshoot sect", or a "semi-Muslim". Like orthodox Muslims, Zikri revere the Quran, but unlike them they believe the Mahdi has already arrived and do not follow the same ritual prayer practices.

=== Non-Muslim groups ===
Hinduism is the second largest religion in Pakistan after Islam, according to the 1998 census. Non-Muslim religions also include Christianity, which has 2,800,000 (1.6%) adherents as of 2005. The Bahá'í Faith claims 30,000, followed by Sikhs, Buddhists and Parsis, each claiming 20,000 adherents, and a very small community of Jains.

== History and general causes ==
=== Causes ===
Some of the general reasons offered for sectarian violence in Pakistan, include

- Socio-economic causes of general instability:
  - socio-economic pressure from having one of the world's highest birthrates, but a scarcity of both water and energy supplies;
  - a multitude of ethnolinguistic groups – "Pashtun, Baloch, Punjabi, Sindhi, Seraiki and Muhajir" – with disputes over the sharing of scarce resources, leading to increased ethnic/regional tensions as "groups began to assert their cultural and nationalist agendas", (an example being the concentration of power and resources in the northeastern part of the country and domination of the military by Punjabis and Pashtuns, while the poor but energy-rich southwestern Baluchistan province has a strong separatist movement). which spilled over into religious disputes (it's been suggested, for example, that "a religious or sect-based conflict" is a way of keeping the Balochis politically divided).
- A crisis of "legitimisation" among successive governments brought on by their failure to achieve "stated developmental agendas" or significant economic growth, making governments "more dependent on Islam as a binding force for society and polity". This was particularly extreme in the case with General Muhammad Zia-ul-Haq, who failed to restore democracy as promised after overthrowing and executing an elected prime minister.
  - General Zia's Islamisation policies from 1977 to 1988 where, he attempted to "gain legitimacy" and create an "Islamic polity and society", were based not on some consensus of Pakistani Muslims interpretation of Islam, or even the most popular Sunni school (Barelvi), but on a "more codified and strict" form of Islam from Saudi Arabia (Wahhabi Islam). Zia's Islamic penal code and the "Islamic" textbooks in state schools and colleges were "derived entirely" from one set of sources, the orthodox "classical Sunni-Hanafi" school. "Minor theological debates and cultural differences" among Pakistanis metastasized into "unbridgeable, volatile sectarian divisions".

During his rule, hardline Sunni religious groups, from which he gained support, were strengthened, and "sunk their roots in Pakistan". The new strict Islamic orthodoxy of these hardline Sunnis strongly disapproved of the shrine pilgrimage practices that were part of practice of the majority Pakistani Barelvi sect, of the Ashura processions (and other doctrines) of the Shia, and especially of beliefs of the tiny Ahmadiyya sect.

- Other causes are Pakistan's involvement in the Jihad against Soviets and their allied Marxists in Afghanistan (1979 to 1989) which led to
  - The easy and abundant availability of weapons imported to fight the Marxist Afghan government and Soviets; Billions of dollars of US arms and Saudi funds poured into the jihad in Afghanistan and the availability of money, arms and trained fighters overflowing from the jihad in Afghanistan. "Central and southern Punjab, served as a base for ‘mujahideen’ recruits. Most of these ‘mujahideen’ returned to Pakistan after the Russian forces pulled out in the late 1980s, and brought with them a sizeable supply of arms, ammunition and a proclivity for violence. They joined the extremist sectarian outfits and since then, sectarian rivalry was largely expressed through extreme violence."
  - One of the outlets for mujahideen after the Soviet forces began to leave Afghanistan (May 1988-February 1989) was Kashmir, where a wave of civil disobedience and protests by the Muslim majority in Kashmir was erupting just as the Soviet forces were leaving Afghanistan (May 1988-February 1989). Committed to help Muslims (which Pakistan believed should have been part of Pakistan to begin with), Pakistan sent in the Jihadis that had trained for Afghan Jihad. New organisations, like Hizbul Mujahideen, were set up, their members were drawn from the ideological spheres of Deobandi seminaries and Jamaat-e-islami.
  - The establishment of "a powerful network of militant madarssas", that "combined weapons training with a fundamentalist and violent interpretation of Islam". These were originally set up to train volunteer 'students' - Taliban - for the war in Afghanistan. Now that the Taliban in Afghanistan are victorious, a substantial numbers of these 'students' (as well as their motivators and mentors) are free to turn "their attention to other areas of conflict, including Pakistan itself". and provide sectarian groups with "an endless stream of recruits". Zia's "goals subsequently coalesced with the national security goal of building close linkages with the Afghan Mujahideen after the Soviet intervention in Afghanistan in 1979".
- Institutions that in theory should keep violence and sectarian in check have been hamstrung.
  - judiciary lack independence,
  - police were subject to political interference and "inefficient" and "incapable".
  - "moderate, secular and democratic" political forces were deprived of "an even playing field".
- International Crisis Group credits continued violence to naive attempts to manipulate and/or co-opt sects.
  - After the 9/11 terror attacks, "foreign donors" hoped to "counter Deobandi militants" such as the Taliban, by strengthening what they believed to be peace-loving rival Barelvi and Sufi sects, as an "antidote" to hard-line, anti-Shia, anti-Western Deobandi and Wahhabi Sunni sects. Barelvis and Barelvi leaders had been victims of sectarian violence, but that did not stop the Barelvi groups Labaik and Sunni Ittehad Council from inciting and using violence as they became more powerful. This included supporting the assassination of Punjab governor Salman Taseer by his police bodyguard (a Barelvi) for Taseer's criticism of blasphemy laws and efforts to obtain a pardon for a woman sentenced to death for blasphemy.
  - Allowing sectarian groups to contest elections and thereby change their direction away from killing people, towards pleasing constituents and getting reelected, appears to "embolden rather than moderate them". In particular, the Labaik group was allowed by the Election Commission of Pakistan to contest the July 2018 national elections, despite its espousing a hardline sectarianism and acts of inciting violence. During the campaign, a Labaik youth leader shot and wounded Interior Minister Ahsan Iqbal, an act defended by the head of Labaik. The group also threatened Supreme Court judges with a "horrible end" if they overruled a blasphemy death sentence being appealed, and declared army chief Qamar Javed Bajwa a non-Muslim, calling for mutiny against him.

=== History ===
As mentioned above, Islamisation policies of General Zia (from 1977 to 1988) strengthened a strict form of Sunni Islam in Pakistan. Pakistan aided the Afghan resistance movement (especially starting in the mid-1980s) with weapons through the Pakistani intelligence services, in a program called Operation Cyclone. After the Soviets withdrew in 1989, the weapons (particularly Kalashnikov assault rifles) did not disappear but were often smuggled into Pakistan by Afghan soldiers in need of money. (Note: "Prime Minister Benazir Bhutto has complained that her country got stuck with its gun problem as a direct result of cooperation with the United States in forcing Soviet troops from Afghanistan. 'We are left on our own to cope with the remnants of the Afghan war, which include arms smuggling . . . drugs and . . . {religious} zealots who were leaders at the time of the Afghan war,'")

In the 1980s and 1990s, the problem of violence was worst was in Karachi and in the province of Sindh. In the 1990s, the insurgency in Indian-administered Kashmir sponsored by the Pakistan military, allowed groups such as the SSP and Lashkar-e-Jhangvi to "consolidate".

Sectarian strife has evolved over the decades. From approximately 1990 to 2011 Sunni and Shia extremists from their respective groups attacked each other. By 2005, observers complained "administrative and legal action" had "failed to dismantle a well-entrenched and widely spread terror infrastructure". Among other techniques, when an extremist group was banned, it gave itself a new name. Police action, however, decimated the leadership of at least the Lashkar-e-Jhangvi so that by the mid-2010s its sectarian attacks against the Shia declined.

Following this period of "relative peace" a new era of sectarian conflict emerged, with Sunni militants "inspired by al-Qaeda's ideology" (principally followers of the Islamic State) became the main instigators of violence.

Former Lashkar-e-Jhangvi rank-and-file joined Islamic State Khorasan Province (ISKP), the Islamic State's local franchise. In 2017 the Barelvi-dominated Tehreek-e-Labbaik Pakistan rose to "prominence" and "took the lead" in home grown Sunni sectarianism. (This was despite the fact Barelvi had a history of "shared ritual practice with Shias", and were "once regarded as the more moderate" Sunni sub-sect.)

== Perpetrators and sectarian groups ==
Some of the paramilitary and terrorist groups that have perpetrated of acts of sectarian violence in Pakistan include:

- Sipah-e-Sahaba Pakistan (SSP, literally, "Guardians of the Prophet's Companions", renamed Millat-e-Islamia, and later Ahl-e Sunnat Wal Jamaat (ASWJ)) - an Islamist organisation that also functions as a political party. Its "foundational tenets" were urging the exclusion of Shias from government jobs; the proscription of Shia religious programs, processions and rituals; spreading fear among the Shia community and particularly among prominent Shias so that they fled the country. In 2011 the group issued a statement declaring all Shias wajib-ul-qatal (fit to be killed). Its origins have been described as Anjuman Sipah-e-Sahaba (ASS) - formed by a group of Deobandi militants to wage 'war' against the Shia landholders in Jhang; but also as having broken away from the main Deobandi Sunni organisation in the 1980s. (Note: Jamiat Ulema-e-Islam (F) in 1985, or from Tanzim-e-Ahlesunnat (TAS) in the 1980s) The group was renamed SSP during the Islamisation campaign of Zia-ul-Haq, which coincided with the Iranian revolution led by Ayatollah Khomeini. SSP, like LeJ, "later became part of the al-Qaeda network in Pakistan".
- Lashkar-e-Jhangvi (LeJ, literally Army of Jhangvi) — has claimed responsibility for various mass casualty attacks against the Shia community in Pakistan, including multiple bombings that killed over 200 Hazara Shias in Quetta in 2013. It has also been linked to the Mominpura Graveyard attack in 1998, the abduction of Daniel Pearl in 2002, and the attack on the Sri Lankan cricket team in Lahore in 2009. A predominantly Punjabi group, the LeJ has been labelled by Pakistani intelligence officials as one of the country's most virulent terrorist organisations. It was created as "ostensibly separate" from the SSP when that organization sought to pursue electoral politics, but its "operatives used SSP mosques and madrasas as hideouts, and SSP networks to plot and carry out attack". Lashkar-e-Jhangvi continued to attacks on Shias until the mid-2010s, when police action decimated its leadership and sectarian attacks declined.
- Tehreek-e-Taliban-e-Pakistan (aka Pakistani Taliban, TTP) — this group attracted LeJ members to join after "horrific attacks" against Shia. Under the leadership of Hakimullah Mehsud, who had a long history of association with LeJ, sectarian killings in Pakistan became "more frequent". Under him, the TTP targeted "munafaqeen" (those who spread discord), which meant not only Ahmedi and Shia but Barelvis/Sufis (who make up about half the population of Pakistan). "The TTP began openly attacking Sufi shrines." Among the stated objectives of TTP is the overthrow the government of Pakistan, by waging a terrorist campaign against its armed forces and security forces. Among other attacks it killed 150, mostly children, in the 2014 Peshawar school massacre. The TTP depends on the tribal belt along the Afghanistan–Pakistan border for support and recruits, and receives ideological guidance from al-Qaeda.
- Jundallah — a "splinter group" of TTP, but as of 2015 aligned with Islamic State – Khorasan Province (ISKP). After one attack by the group that killed 60 Shia worshipers, its spokesperson Ahmed (Fahad) Marwat stated: "Our target was the Shi'a community mosque… they are our enemies"
- Islamic State – Khorasan Province (ISKP) – the local Islamic State branch. As of 2022, the group is primarily an urban phenomenon, seemingly composed of de-centralised units that target Shia sites, avoiding the more dangerous task of directly challenging the Pakistan state. Its recruits have been primarily disgruntled Deobandi militants from Lashkar-e-Jhangvi/SSP (whose leadership has been decimated), or the Pakistani Taliban. (Unlike members in Afghanistan, its members are predominantly Deobandi rather than Salafi). It was responsible for the 4 March 2022 bombing of a Shia mosque in Peshawar which killed more than 60.
- Tehreek-e-Labbaik Pakistan (Labbaik, for short) — a hardline political party and violent protest movement, most of whose followers are Barelvi, which mobilises around perceived insults to the Islamic prophet Muhammad. Starting around 2017, Labbaik has been responsible for inciting or conducting some of the worst sectarian and vigilante violence in Pakistan. In particular the 3 December 2021 mob lynching of Priyantha Kumara, a Sri Lankan factory manager wrongly accused of blasphemy. While Labbaik does not represent Barelvi Islam, most of its followers are Barelvi. Labaik has embraced an anti-Shia agenda, breaking with Barelvis’ history of shared ritual practice with Shias. Among other activities, the group threatened Supreme Court judges with a "horrible end" if they overruled the Asia Bibi blasphemy sentence, called for mutiny against army chief Qamar Javed Bajwa, who it declared a non-Muslim. A Labaik youth leader shot and wounded Interior Minister Ahsan Iqbal, during the July 2018 elections campaign, which another Labaik leader justified on the grounds that Iqbal's party (PML-N) had committed blasphemy.
- Tehreek-e-Jafaria Pakistan (TeJP, Movement of Ja'fari (Ja'fari is the 12er Shia school of fiqh) — was a Shia political party founded in 1979 by Syed Arif Hussain Al Hussaini to protect the interests of the Shiite minority and to spread the ideas of the leader of the Iranian Islamic Revolution, Ayatollah Ruhollah Khomeini. Its origins are in Tehreek Nifaz Fiqah-e-Jafria (TNFJ). A splinter group, the Sipah-e-Muhammad Pakistan (SMP), with a significant following in Jhang, emerged in 1994 as a prominent Shia terrorist outfit involved in anti-SSP campaigns, violence and target killings. TeJP was banned along with three terrorist organizations by the government of Pakistan on 12 January 2002, and again on 5 November 2011.
- Sipah-e-Muhammad Pakistan (SMP, Army of Muhammad) — is an Iranian supported Shia group that splintered off from TeJP; it has been involved in sectarian terrorist activity primarily in Pakistani Punjab. in the 1980 and 90s it, "engaged in tit-for-tat killings" with the SSP. The SMP was proscribed by President Pervez Musharraf as a sectarian terrorist outfit on 14 August 2001.

== Victims and causes ==
=== Barelvi Muslims ===
From 1986 to 2020 "more than 600 Barelvi leaders and activists" have been killed and "almost all" the major Sufi shrines, including Abdullah Shah Ghazi, Data Darbar, and Lal Shahbaz Qalandar, have come under attack.

In April 2006, the entire leadership of two prominent Barelvi outfits, the Sunni Tehreek and Jamaat Ahle Sunnat were killed in a bomb attack in Nishtar Park, in Pakistan's largest city and business hub Karachi. On 12 June 2009, Sarfraz Ahmed Naeemi, a prominent Barelvi cleric and outspoken critic of the Tehrik-i-Taliban Pakistan was killed in a suicide bombing.

==== Sufi shrines ====
Sufism, a mystical Islamic tradition, has a long history and a large popular following in Pakistan, where it is "followed by the Barelvi school of thought". Orthodox Deobandis "perceive the Barelvi shrine culture as idolatrous" and Deobandi militants have targeted major Barelvi shrines. Between 2005 and 2010 hundreds of Barelvi sect members were killed in more than 70 suicide attacks at different religious shrines . In two years, 2010 and 2011, 128 people were killed and 443 were injured in 22 attacks on (mostly Sufi) shrines and tombs of saints and religious people in Pakistan.

These shrines include

- the Data Darbar in Lahore where a July 2010 bombing killed at least 50 people injured 200 others;
- the Bari Imam tomb in Islamabad in 2005 where a bombing killed twenty people;
- the Shrine of Lal Shahbaz Qalandar in Sehwan in a November 2017 suicide attack where a bombing killed at least 90 people and injured over 300;
- Abdullah Shah Ghazi's tomb in Karachi was attacked in 2010 by suicide bombers who killed 10 and injured 50;
- the Khal Magasi in Balochistan, and Rahman Baba's tomb in Peshawar have also been attacked,

Perpetrators of these acts include Tehreek-e-Taliban-e-Pakistan (aka Pakistani Taliban, TTP), Sipah-e-Sahaba Pakistan (SSP), and Lashkar-e-Taiba.

Popular Sufi culture is centred on Thursday night gatherings at shrines and annual festivals which feature Sufi music and dance. Contemporary Islamic fundamentalists criticise its popular character, which in their view, deviates from the teachings and practice of Muhammad and his companions.

=== Deobandi Muslims ===
There have been assassinations or attempted assassinations of several Deobandi religious leaders.

On 18 May 2000, a leading Deobandi leader and scholar Mullah Muhammad Yusuf Ludhianvi, who taught at one of Pakistan's largest Deobandi seminaries, the Jamia Uloom-ul-Islamia, was gunned down by unidentified attackers in Karachi, in a suspected targeted sectarian killing.

On 30 May 2004, Mufti Nizamuddin Shamzai, Shaykh al-Hadith of Jamia Uloom-ul-Islamia was assassinated in Karachi.

On 22 March 2020, an assassination attempt was made on Mufti Taqi Usmani, a prominent intellectual leader and religious scholar of the Deobandi movement, which he survived.

On 10 October 2020, Maulana Muhammad Adil Khan, another prominent religious scholar and head of Jamia Farooqia, was gunned down by unidentified attackers in Karachi in apparent sectarian violence.

Deobandis have alleged a bias towards Barelvis by the provincial government of Punjab.

=== Salafi Muslims (Ahl-e-Hadith) ===
Although the Ahl-e-Hadith (Local Salafi) community constitutes a relatively small minority within Pakistan's Sunni population compared to the majority Barelvi and Deobandi schools, its leadership, clergy and institutions have been targets of sectarian violence.

A major early flashpoint occurred in March 1987, when Allama Ehsan Elahi Zaheer, a prominent Islamic scholar and the founder of Markazi Jamiat Ahle Hadith, was assassinated alongside several other clerics in a bomb blast at a rally in Lahore. Zaheer, a fierce and highly polemical critic of Shia Islam, was mortally wounded in an explosion hidden near the stage. His assassination was widely attributed to militant Shia factions in retaliation for his anti-Shia writings and views.

In addition to historic friction with militant Shia groups, the Ahl-e-Hadith have experienced localized disputes with the majority Barelvi population. Because the Ahl-e-Hadith strictly reject Sufism, shrine culture, and traditional rituals practiced by Barelvis, theological disputes have periodically resulted in physical clashes over administrative control of local mosques and madrassas. For instance in April 2007, a fatal armed clash occurred in Karachi when activists belonging to the Barelvi organization Sunni Tehreek attempted to forcibly seize control of the Jamia Masjid Ahle Hadith, resulting in the death of an Ahl-e-Hadith worshipper and injuries to several others.

Targeted assassinations of prominent Ahl-e-Hadith figures have continued into the 21st century. In September 2023, Maulana Zia ur Rehman, a senior Ahl-e-Hadith leader and head of Jamia Abi Bakar Al-Islamia (One of Karachi's largest Salafi seminaries), was gunned down by unknown assailants.

==== Islamic State - Khorasan Province's campaign against religious scholars ====
In the Khyber Pakhtunkhwa province, mainstream Ahl-e-Hadith scholars have also been caught in the crossfire of militant rivalries. The Islamic State - Khorasan Province operates on a radicalized, violent variant of Salafism and frequently targets Ahl-e-Hadith and other religious figures who publicly oppose its ideology and or support state institutions.

On January 2022, Sheikh Abdul Hameed Rehmati, a renowned Salafi religious scholar known for his vocal opposition to IS-KP, was assassinated in a targeted attack by motorcycle-riding gunmen in Peshawar. Security analysts attribute his assassination to IS-KP, which had previously issued strong warnings and criticisms against Peshawar-based Salafi leaders who openly rejected the group's extremist views.

On October 2022, Maulana Abdul Aziz, another prominent Salafi scholar, was shot dead by unidentified gunmen in Bara, Khyber Tribal District, while walking home from a mosque; local sources and police reports indicated he was targeted specifically for preaching anti-IS-KP views during his sermons.

Targeted campaigns continued into late 2025, when a Salafi cleric named Mawlawi Izzatullah was killed in an armed attack near Peshawar, an operation for which IS-KP officially claimed responsibility.

=== Shia Muslims ===
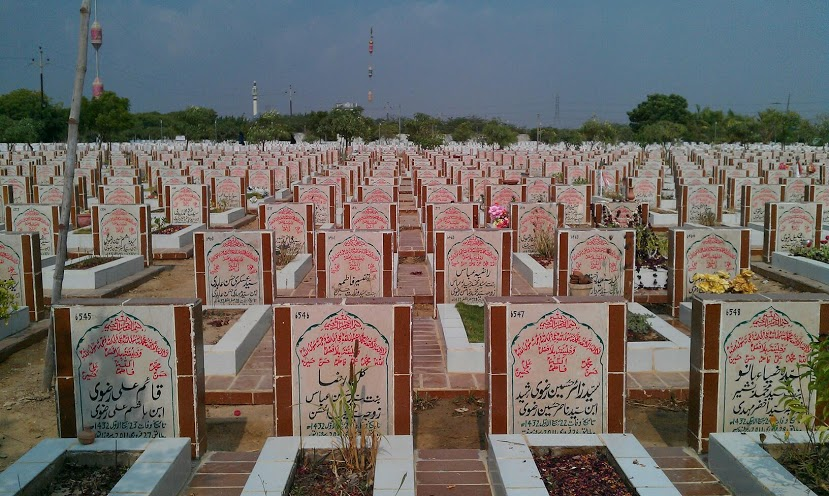
Since 2001, more than 2,600 Shia Muslims have been killed in violent attacks in Pakistan. Many are buried in the Wadi-e-Hussain Cemetery, Karachi.

Shia, the largest religious minority group in Pakistan, have been "the focus of most sectarian violence" in Pakistan. Between 2001 and 2018, approximately 4800 Shias were killed in sectarian violence. (Note: 4800 comes from South Asia Terrorism Portal; the blog "Let us build Pakistan" (LUBP), states a much larger number of Shia Muslims were killed over a longer period -- 24,306 killed from 1955 to 30 June 2021. (The number is based on reports in the "mainstream media" and may exclude some deaths "due to paucity of resources, fear of victimization, and lack of communication networks in many areas").) Extreme sectarian Sunni Muslims have takfired (excommunicated) Shia for their belief that the first three Muslim caliphs (Abu Bakr, Umar, Uthman) were usurpers (Ali being the only true Rashidun Caliph in the Shia view).

==== Early years of Pakistan ====
At least one scholar (Vali Nasr), sees the period before the Iranian Islamic Revolution as a time of relative unity and harmony between pious, traditionalist Sunni and Shia Muslims—a unity brought on by a feeling of being under siege from a common threat, i.e. secularism. However, the first major sectarian massacre in Pakistan occurred in 1963, some years before the Iranian revolution, when 118 Shia were killed by a mob of Deobandi Muslims in Therhi, Sindh.

Muhammad Ali Jinnah, the founder of Pakistan (whose religious beliefs are disputed but who followed the Twelver Shi'a teachings as an adult), (Note: Jinnah was of a Gujarati Khoja Nizari Isma'ili Shi’a Muslim background, though he later followed the Twelver Shi'a teachings,) was known to say things like "... in this state of Pakistan. You may belong to any religion or caste or creed — that has nothing to do with the business of the state ... ". Historian Moonis Ahmar writes, "in the formative phase of Pakistan, the notion of religious extremism was almost non-existent as the founder of the country, Quaid-e-Azam Mohammad Ali Jinnah, made it clear that the new state would not be theocratic in nature. However, after his demise on September 11, 1948, his successors failed to curb the forces of religious militancy ..." (Note: After the death of Jinnah, Nawabzada Liaquat Ali Khan, allied with the ulema and passed the Objectives Resolution which adopted the Islam as state religion. Jinnah's appointed law minister, Jogendra Nath Mandal, resigned from his post. Shias of Pakistan allege discrimination by the Pakistani government since 1948, claiming that Sunnis are given preference in business, official positions and administration of justice.) Although the sectarian literature attacking Shi'ism has been distributed into Punjab since Shah Abd al-Aziz wrote his Tuhfa Asna Ashariya, major incidents of anti-Shia violence began only after mass migration in 1947, when the strict and sectarian clergy from Uttar Pradesh brought their version of Islam to the Sufism-oriented Punjab and Sindh.

Sectarian Sunni extremists were "particularly harsh in damning Ashoura"—aka Azadari, or the Mourning of Muharram—as "a heathen spectacle" and a "shocking affront to the memory of the rightful caliphs".

Many students of Molana Abdul Shakoor Farooqi and Molana Hussain Ahmad Madani migrated to Pakistan and either set up seminaries here or became part of the Tanzim-e-Ahle-Sunnat (TAS) or Jamiat Ulema-e-Islam (JUI), preaching against Shi'i rituals of Azadari/Muharram/Ashoura. (Note: Among those in Tanzim-e-Ahle-Sunnat (TAS) or Jamiat Ulema-i-Islam (JUI), preaching against Shi'i rituals of Azadari were: Molana Noorul Hasan Bukhari, Molana Dost Muhammad Qureshi, Molana Abdus Sattar Taunsavi, Molana Mufti Mahmood, Molana Abdul Haq Haqqani, Molana Sarfaraz Khan Safdar Gakharvi, and Molana Manzoor Ahmad Naumani.)

In the 1950s, Tanzim-e-Ahle-Sunnat (TAS) started to arrange public gatherings all over Pakistan to preach against Shia sanctities. The TAS monthly periodical, called Da’wat, also included anti-Shia preaching. During the Muharram of 1955, attacks took place on at least 25 Shia targets in Punjab. In 1956, thousands of armed villagers gathered to attack Shia mourning Hussein in the small town of Shahr Sultan, but were prevented by Police at least from killing anyone. On 7 August 1957, three Shias were killed during an attack in Sitpur village. In response to Shia outrage, TAS insisted the cause of the rioting and bloodshed was Azadari, not those attacking it, and demanded that the government ban the tradition. In May 1958, a Shia orator Agha Mohsin was target-killed in Bhakkar.

Muhammad Ayub Khan enforced Martial Law in 1958. In the 1960s, Shias started to face state persecution when Azadari processions were banned at some places and the ban was lifted only after protests. In Lahore, the main procession of Mochi gate was forced to change its route. After Martial Law was lifted in 1962, anti-Shia propaganda started again, both in the form of books and weekly papers. The Deobandi TAS demanded the Azadari to be limited to Shia ghetto's. Following Muharram, on 3 June 1963, two Shias were killed and over a hundred injured in an attack on Ashura procession in Lahore. In a small town of Tehri in the Khairpur District of Sindh, 120 Shias were slaughtered. On 16 June, six Deobandi organisations arranged a public meeting in Lahore where they blamed Shia for the violence. The report of the commission appointed to inquire into the riots led to no punishment of the perpetrators. (Note: Mahmood Ahmad Abbasi, Abu Yazid Butt, Qamar-ud-Din Sialvi and others wrote books against Shias.)

In 1969, Ashura procession was attacked in Jhang. On 26 February 1972, Ashura procession was stone pelted on in Dera Ghazi Khan. In May 1973, the Shia neighbourhood of Gobindgarh in Sheikhupura district was attacked by Deobandi mob. There were troubles in Parachinar and Gilgit too. In 1974, Shia villages were attacked in Gilgit by armed Deobandi men. January 1975 saw several attacks on Shia processions in Karachi, Lahore, Chakwal and Gilgit. In Babu Sabu, a village near Lahore, three Shias were killed and many were left injured.

An example of anti-Shi'i propaganda can be found in an editorial of Al-Haq magazine written by Molana Samilul Haq:

"We must also remember that Shias consider it their religious duty to harm and eliminate the Ahle-Sunna .... the Shias have always conspired to convert Pakistan to a Shia state ... They have been conspiring with our foreign enemies and with the Jews. It was through such conspiracies that the Shias masterminded the separation of East Pakistan and thus satiated their thirst for the blood of the Sunnis".

(In fact, contrary to the claims of Samilul Haq, the Shia population of Bangladesh is very small, and it is widely agreed that the independence struggle of Bangladesh was motivated by economic and cultural grievances, (refusal by the government to use the Bengali language, disproportionate government funding of West Pakistan, etc.) Shias of Pakistan form a small minority in civil and military services where they have tried to downplay their religious identity for fears of discrimination.)

==== Post-Zia era and causes of the outbreak of sectarianism ====
"Most analysts agree" that Sunni-Shia strife began in earnest in 1979 when having overthrown populist leftist Zulfikar Ali Bhutto was overthrown by General Muhammad Zia-ul-Haq.

===== Some causes =====
- General Zia was a conservative and pious Sunni Muslim, but as a military dictator he also needed to legitimise his military rule and did so by Islamicising Pakistani politics. Islamic religious parties felt empowered by the islamization program and the Islamic religious revival in general, and the influence of socialism and modernism began to wane. According to the International Crisis Group,

Sunni militant groups sunk their roots in Pakistan during General Zia-ul-Haq’s military government (1977-1988). The anti-Soviet jihad in Afghanistan, efforts to curb Shia militancy in response to Iran’s 1979 revolution, the regime’s Islamisation program – all these Zia-era policies prepared the ground for organisations with sectarian agendas to flourish.

- Among the mujahideen (mentioned above) returning to Pakistan from Afghanistan in the late 1980s, bringing "with them a sizeable supply of arms, ammunition and a proclivity for violence", were both Sunni and Shia. However, Sunnis formed a large majority in Pakistan, and also among the mujahideen. Radical Sunni Islamists were able to establish armed groups like the Sipah-e-Sahaba.
- Mujahideen who went to fight jihad in Kashmir as part of organisations, like Hizbul Mujahideen, were drawn from the ideological spheres of Deobandi seminaries and Jamaat-e-islami, a milieu intolerant of Shia. These jihadis used time at home to act as part-time sectarian terrorists.
- The Iranian Islamic revolution of 1979 "boosted" the self-confidence of Shia in Pakistan (and elsewhere), but created a Sunni backlash. Shia were traditionally subservient to the majority Sunni sect, but the Islamic revolution—in majority Shia Iran, led by a Shia religious leader, and praised by a leading Sunni Islamist (and Pakistani) Abul A'la Maududi—inspired Shia. Newly assertive Shia joined "avowedly Shia political movements", (such as Tehreek-e-Jafaria Pakistan) often funded by the Islamic Republic of Iran, and pushing "specifically Shia political agendas".

In Pakistan, Shia resisted Zia-ul-Haq's Islamization campaign as "Sunnification", as the laws and regulations were based on Sunni fiqh (jurisprudence). In July 1980, 25,000 Shia protested the Islamization laws in the capital Islamabad. Shia won an exemption from state zakat collection, but in the long term helped "make sectarian divisions a central issue in the country's politics". This assertiveness changed the attitude of Sunni towards Shia from "misguided brethren" to "upstart heretics", a viewpoint that came to be spread not just by "marginal extremists" but "senior Sunni Ulama".

- Personalities. Further exacerbating the situation was the dislike between Shia leader Imam Khomeini and Pakistan's General Muhammad Zia ul-Haq. Khomeini threatened to do to the Pakistani leader "what he had done to the Shah" if Zia mistreated the Shia in Pakistan; and on another occasion mocked Zia's warning not to provoke a superpower by saying he, (Khomeini), had his own superpower – his being God while Zia's was the United States.
- Khomeini's campaign to overthrow the House of Saud in Saudi Arabia and the strong opposition among pious Sunni to it. The Iranian revolution had surprised Iranians as well as the rest of the world in overthrowing what everyone thought was the powerful, secure, Shah of Iran. This contributed to confidence among the revolutionaries that their success was just the beginning of similar revolutionary overthrows of other lax Muslim monarchies. Khomeini set his eyes on Saudi Arabia, which was an ally of America, but also the patron of conservative Sunni revivalists, not least those in Pakistan. Saudi spent billions of dollars every year funding Islamic schools, scholarships, fellowships, and mosques around the Sunni world. "Thousands of aspiring preachers, Islamic scholars, and activists ... joined Saudi-funded think tanks and research institutions." They "then spread throughout the Muslim world to teach" what they had learned and "work at Saudi-funded universities, schools, mosques, and research institutions." One influential conservative Sunni religious leader, Molana Manzoor Ahmad Naumani, opposed both Shia and the Sunni Islamist Jamaat-e-Islami and feared that the revolution might actually empower them both. He obtained funding from Rabta Aalam-i-Islami of Saudi Arabia and wrote a book against Shias and Khomeini, (Īrānī inqilāb, Imām K͟humainī, aur Shīʻiyat or "Khomeini, Iranian Revolution and Shi'ite faith".) Meanwhile, cleric Molana Haq Nawaz Jhangvi from Punjab, reorganized Taznim-e-Ahle-Sunnat renaming it Anjuman Sipah-e-Sahaba (ASS), later changing it to Sipah-e-Sahaba Pakistan (SSP).
- The Islamic revival brought out the doctrinal differences between Shia and Sunni. According to scholar Vali Nasr, as the Muslim world was decolonialised and nationalism lost its appeal, religion filled its place. As religion became more important, so did a return to its fundamentals and a following of its finer points; differences once overlooked or tolerated became deviations to be denouncing and fought, and there were many differences between Sunni and Shia. Fundamentalism blossomed and conflicts reasserted, in particular when Sunni followed the strict teachings of Sunni scholar Ibn Taymiyyah, who considered Shia apostates and who is held in high regard by Sunni Salafi.

===== Attacks =====
A series of attacks in the later 1970s and 1980s include:

- In February 1978, Ali Basti, a Shia neighborhood in Karachi, was attacked by a Deobandi mob and 5 men were killed.
- During Muharram of that year, Azadari processions were attacked in Lahore and Karachi leaving 22 Shias dead.
- After Soviet Union invaded Afghanistan in 1979, the country became a safe haven for conservative Sunni jihadis ostensibly in Pakistan to wage jihad against the Marxists in Afghanistan, but these jihadis also sometimes attacked Shia civilians. During Muharram 1980, the Afghan Refugees settled near Parachinar attacked Shia villages and in 1981, they expelled Shias from Sadda, Khyber Pakhtunkhwa.
- In 1983, Shias neighbourhoods of Karachi were attacked on Eid Milad-un-Nabi. At least 60 people were killed 94 houses were set on fire, 10 Shias were killed. On Muharram 1983, there were again attacks on Shias in Karachi.
- From 1984 to 1986 Muharram disturbances spread to Lahore and the Baluchistan region leaving hundreds more dead.
- On 6 July 1985, police opened fire on a Shia demonstration in Quetta, killing 17 Shias. Shias responded and 11 attackers were killed. According to police report, among the 11 attackers who died in the clash only 2 were identified as police sepoys and 9 were civilian Deobandis wearing fake police uniforms.
- In Muharram 1986, 7 Shias were killed in Punjab, 4 in Lahore, 3 in Layyah.
- In July 1987, Shia in the northwestern town of Parachinar were attacked by Sunni Afghan Mujahideen, but were able to fight back, many of them armed with locally made automatic weapons. 52 Shias and 120 attackers lost their lives.
- In 1988, 9 unarmed Shia civilians were shot dead while defying a ban on Shia procession in Dera Ismail Khan.

In the 1988 Gilgit Massacre, somewhere between 150 and 900 Shia Muslims were killed after fighting started over whether Ramadan fasting was over and Eid al-Fitr could begin (Sunni maintaining the Shia had broken the fast too early). In response to the riots and revolt against Zia-ul-Haq's regime, the Pakistan Army led an armed group of local Sunni tribals from Chilas, accompanied by Osama bin Laden-led Sunni militants from Afghanistan and Pakistan's North-West Frontier Province into Gilgit City and adjoining areas in order to suppress the revolt.

From 1987 to 2007, "as many as 4,000 people are estimated to have died" in Shia-Sunni sectarian fighting in Pakistan". Amongst the culprits blamed for the killing were Al-Qaeda working "with local sectarian groups" to kill what they perceive as Shia apostates, and "foreign powers ... trying to sow discord." Most violence took place in the largest province of Punjab and the country's commercial and financial capital, Karachi. There were also conflagrations in the provinces of Khyber Pakhtunkhwa, Balochistan and Azad Kashmir, with several hundreds of Shia killed in Balochistan killed since 2008. Shia responded to the attacks creating a classic vicious cycle of "outrages and vengeance".

Rivalry between [ Sipah-e-Sahaba Pakistan and Tehreek-e-Jaferia Pakistan ] intensified when the SSP founder Haq Nawaz Jhangvi was killed in March 1990. The same year also witnessed the killing of an Iranian diplomat, Sadiq Ganji in Lahore. In 1997, Jhangvi's successor Zia-ur-Rehman Farooqi and 26 others were killed in a bomb blast at the Lahore Sessions Court. In the aftermath, Iranian diplomat Muhammad Ali Rahimi and six locals were killed in an attack on the Iranian Cultural Centre in Multan. On April 12, 2000 three hand grenades were lobbed at a gathering in a Shia mosque in Mulawali, the hometown of Syed Sajid Naqvi, killing 13 persons, including five members of the family of Syed Sajid Naqvi. The grenade was reportedly hurled from an adjacent Sunni mosque. Shortly thereafter, a TJP leader, Syed Farrukh Barjees was killed at Khanewal near Multan on April 26. On November 23, 2000, Anwar Ali Akhunzada, the central general secretary of TJP in Peshawar was assassinated by the Lashkar-e-Jhangvi (LeJ).

One element of the violence was Shia "intellecticide" beginning in the 1990s: doctors, engineers, professors, businessmen, clerics, lawyers, civil servants and other men of learning were listed and then murdered "in a systematic attempt to remove Shias from positions of authority." Between January and May 1997, 75 Shia community leaders were assassinated by Sunni terror groups. The mainstream media of Pakistan, either out of fear of jihadists or ideological orientation, did not disclose the religion of the victims, leading the public to think a systematic one-sided campaign was tit-for-tat, or even that Shias were the aggressors and the Deobandis the victims. It also prevented researchers and human rights activists from gathering the correct data and forming a realistic narrative. Another tactic deployed that helped confuse the situation, at least for a while, was the changing of the names of terror groups. Instead of groups whose anti-Shia orientation was widely known, credit for attacks would be taken by an unfamiliar name. In the 1980s Tanzim-e-Ahlesunnat (TAS) had come to be known as Sipah-e-Sahaba Pakistan, in the 1990s a new umbrella was set up under the name of Lashkar-e-Jhangvi (LeJ), whose members, though ostensibly a separate organization, were supported by SSP's lawyers and funding. In 2003, SSP became Ahl-e Sunnat Wal Jamaat (ASWJ).

By the mid-1990s early financial support Shia activism in Pakistan from the revolutionary government of Iran had "dried up".

Also in the 1990s, Sunni extremists "began to demand" that Shia be declared a "non-Muslim minority", (as the Ahmadiyya had been), so that they were forbidden from calling their places of worship mosques and were subject to laws governing non-Muslims.

Faith-based violence against Shias in post 9/11 Pakistan
Year	Bomb Blasts	Firing Incidents	Urban	Rural	Killed	Injured
2001	0	7	6	1	31	6
2002	0	6	6	0	29	47
2003	1	4	5	0	83	68
2004	5	4	9	0	130	250
2005	4	2	2	4	91	122
2006	2	3	2	3	116	unknown
2007	2	11	4	9	442	423
2008	6	10	7	9	416	453
2009	8	27	19	16	381	593
2010	7	16	16	7	322	639
2011	2	33	26	9	203	156
2012	11	310	247	74	630	616
2013	20	283	269	34	1222	2256
2014	7	262	251	18	361	275
2015	11	99	100	10	369	400
2016	2	54	49	7	65	207
2017	4	34	26	12	308	133
2018	1	28	24	5	58	50
2019	2+	15+	16+	1+	38+	9+

The incidents of violence in cities occur more often than in rural areas. This is because the large numbers of people migrating from rural areas to the city, seek refuge in religious organisations to fight the urban culture and to look for new friends of similar rural mindset.

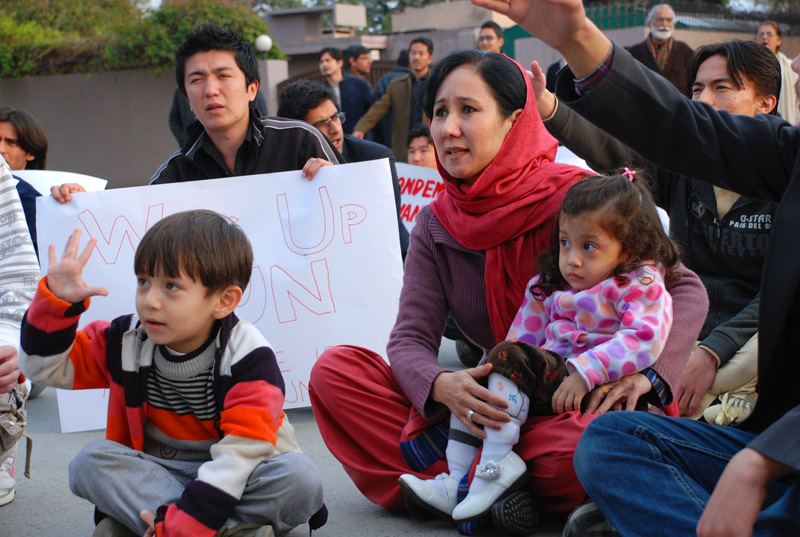
Protest in Islamabad against the persecution of Hazaras, 2013

In 2013, in one city alone, the Balochistan capital of Quetta, there were a series of bombings mostly targeting Shia: in January (130 killed, 270 injured), February (91 killed, 190 injured), several in June (26 killed, dozens injured), and August (37 killed, 50+ injured).

==== Post-2015 era ====
According to International Crisis Group "a new era of sectarian conflict" started around 2015. At this point action by the police "decimated" the leadership of Lashkar-e-Jhangvi, and its sectarian attacks, (i.e. attacks on Shia), declined. However, in the wake of LeJ's decline "two distinct new forces" rose:

- the Islamic State's "Khorasan Province" (ISKP), and
- the hardline political party and violent protest movement Tehreek-e-Labbaik Pakistan (aka Labbaik).

The ISKP has picked up the slack of LeJ's terror, with many of LeJ's foot soldiers joining ISKP despite the fact that their background is Deobandi and ISKP follows Salafi in doctrine.

Labbaik focused primarily on blasphemy, and attacks on not only alleged blasphemers but anyone who defended them. In August 2020, about 42 blasphemy cases were registered, primarily targeting Shias, including a three-year-old Shia child.

In July 2020, the Punjab Legislative Assembly of Pakistan passed the Tahaffuz-e-Bunyad-e-Islam (Protection of Foundation of Islam) Bill, that heightened Sunni-Shia sectarian tensions. The bill made it mandatory for all Pakistani Muslims to revere the historical Muslim figures esteemed by Sunni Muslims, despite the fact that Shia consider some of them usurpers. The passing of the bill sparked outrage among the Shia clergy that the bill was contrary to Shia beliefs.

After Shia clergy made disparaging remarks against historical Islamic figures, televised during the Shia Ashura procession, (Ashura commemorates the Battle of Karbala, which caused the schism in Islam), Sunni groups proclaimed the remarks and any like them intolerable. Thousands of Pakistanis marched at an anti-Shia protest in Karachi, the country's financial hub, on 11 September 2020. Labaik's chief in Karachi reportedly urged his followers to behead people who "blasphemed" against historical figures revered among Sunnis.

Other 21st century sectarian issues in Pakistan involving Shia include pressure on the government by Shia activists for the release of "several hundred" Shia thought to have been subject to enforced disappearance. These individuals are often subject to "physical, but especially psychological, torture", kept in dark cells and incommunicado from loved ones, "some are believed to have died in detention". At least 61 people were killed and another 196 injured when a Shia mosque in Peshawar was attacked by a suicide bomber on 4 March 2022. Islamic State (ISKP) claimed responsibility.

==== Kurram 2024 ====
As of late 2024 attacks on Shia in the Kurram District of the northwest and tit for tat retaliation have led to over 80 dead in just three days from November 21 to 23. The northwest region has suffered from militancy for "decades". Between 2007 and 2011 approximately 2000 people, primarily Shi'a were killed. But the development of armed Shia and Sunni groups has exacerbated the situation, and over 200 people were killed from July to November 2024.

==== Other Shi'i sects ====
There are other Shi'i sect in Pakistan—including Ismailis and Bohras—but they have not been as frequently targeted by extremists as the Twelvers, because of their smaller numbers, and tendency to be more affluent and live in close-knit communities. Nevertheless, in May 2015 gunmen boarded a bus carrying Ismaili Shia (there are approximately 500,000 in Pakistan) and massacred at least 45. In other attacks, seven members of the Bohra sect (of which there are less than 100,000 in Pakistan) were killed in September 2012 from two terrorist blasts in a predominantly Bohra market in Karachi. In 2018, two worshipers were killed when another bomb detonated outside a Bohra mosque moments after an evening prayer service.

=== Ahmadis ===
The freedom of religion in Pakistan of Ahmadis, i.e. members of the Ahmadi Islamic sect, has been curtailed by a series of ordinances, acts and constitutional amendments, including the Second Amendment to the Constitution of Pakistan and Ordinance XX. Ahmadis were declared to be 'Non-Muslims' by the government of Zulfikar Ali Bhutto in 1974 under pressure from conservative Sunnis, and this has led to thousands of cases of Ahmadis being charged with various offences for alleged blasphemy and further fueled the sectarian tensions which exist in Pakistan. Some of the worst attacks on Ahmadis have been the:

- 1953 Lahore riots, where demonstrations in the city of Lahore in February 1953, escalating into looting, arson and the murder of somewhere between 200 and 2000 Ahmadis, and displacement of thousands more.
- 1974 Anti-Ahmadiyya riots, which involving killing, torture, looting, robbery, and burning of Ahmad and their homes, businesses and mosques in localities throughout Pakistan from late May to early September 1974. Following the riots authorities reacted not with a clampdown on the perpetrators but by passing an amendment to the constitution defining Ahmadis as 'non-Muslim', a demand of the rioters which would lead to some Ahmadis losing their jobs or making it difficult to find employment.
- May 2010 attacks on Ahmadi mosques, where 86 people were killed, and more than 100 injured in Lahore, when an Ahmadi mosque and religious center were attacked by gunmen during Friday prayers on 28 May 2010.

In 2014, a prominent surgeon, Dr. Mehdi Ali Qamar, a Canadian national, was killed in front of his family while he was on a humanitarian visit to Pakistan, one of 138 Ahmadis who were killed in Pakistan from 2010 to 2014.

Following the 2010 Lahore massacre, United Nations Secretary-General Ban Ki-moon, said "Members of this religious community have faced continuous threats, discrimination and violent attacks in Pakistan. There is a real risk that similar violence might happen again unless advocacy of religious hatred that constitutes incitement to discrimination, hostility or violence is adequately addressed. The Government must take every step to ensure the security of members of all religious minorities and their places of worship so as to prevent any recurrence of today's dreadful incident." Ban's spokesperson expressed condemndation and extended his condolences to the families of the victims and to the Government.

=== Zikris ===
Zikri have been victims of discrimination, harassment, forced conversions, attempts to have them declared non-Muslims, and killings. These attacks have flared up from time to time (Note: "The Zikri question has become one of the leading issues during last few years which mobilized enormous resistance by the religious groups, particularly the Jamiat Ulema-e-Islam (JUI), in Balochistan") since before the founding of Pakistan. Recent attacks and insecurity have led sizable numbers of Zikri (like other minorities) to flee from Balochistan to "safer cities in Pakistan like Karachi, Lahore, Rawalpindi and Islamabad".

=== Non-Muslims ===
==== Christians ====
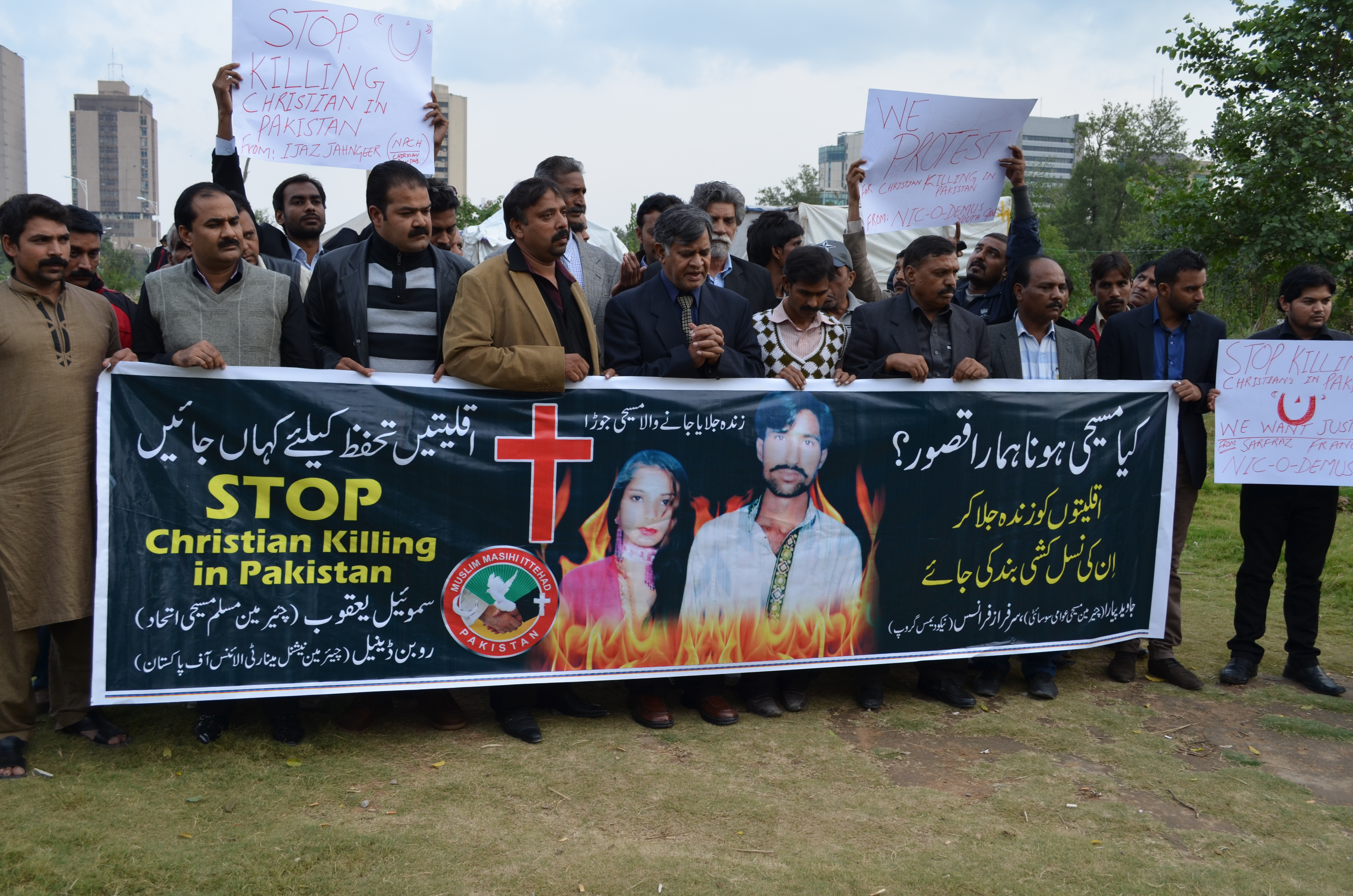
Protest against the killing of Christians in Pakistan

A Christian church in Islamabad was attacked after 11 September 2001, and some Americans were among the dead.

On 22 September 2013, a twin suicide bomb attack took place at All Saints Church in Peshawar, Pakistan, in which 127 people were killed and over 250 injured. On 15 March 2015, two blasts took place at Roman Catholic Church and Christ Church during Sunday service at Youhanabad town of Lahore. At least 15 people were killed and seventy were wounded in the attacks.

==== Hindus ====
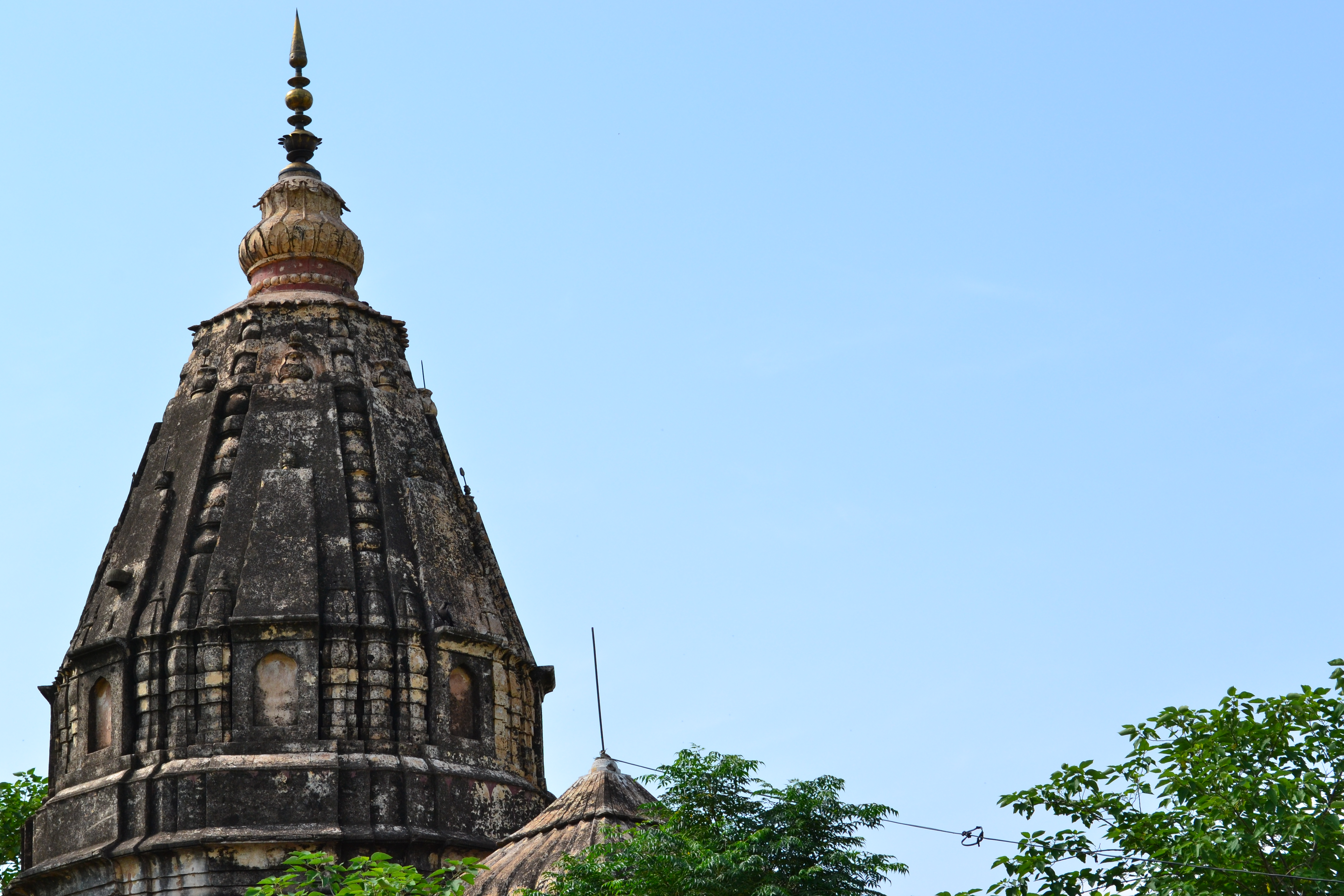
Krishan Mandir, Kallar, Pakistan

Hindus in Pakistan have faced persecution due to their religious beliefs. Because of this, some of them choose to take refuge in next-door India. According to the Human Rights Commission of Pakistan data, just around 1000 Hindu families fled to India in 2013, and according to MP Ramesh Kumar Vankwani, as of May 2014, approximately 5000 Hindus are migrating from Pakistan to India every year.

===== Persecution =====
Those Pakistani Hindus who have fled to India allege that Hindu girls are sexually harassed in Pakistani schools, adding that Hindu students are made to read the Quran and that their religious practices are mocked.

In the aftermath of the Babri Masjid demolition by Hindu nationalists in India, Pakistani Hindus faced riots. Mobs attacked five Hindu temples in Karachi and set fire to 25 temples in towns across the province of Sindh. Shops owned by Hindus were also attacked in Sukkur. Hindu homes and temples were also attacked in Quetta.

In 2005, 32 Hindus were killed by firing from the government side near Nawab Akbar Bugti's residence during bloody clashes between Bugti tribesmen and paramilitary forces in Balochistan. The firing left the Hindu residential locality near Bugti's residence badly hit.

The rise of Taliban insurgency in Pakistan has been an influential and increasing factor in the persecution of and discrimination against religious minorities in Pakistan, such as Hindus, Christians, Sikhs, and other minorities. It is said that there is persecution of religious minorities in Pakistan.

In July 2010, around 60 members of the minority Hindu community in Karachi were attacked and evicted from their homes following an incident of a Dalit Hindu youth drinking water from a tap near an Islamic mosque.

In January 2014, a policeman standing guard outside a Hindu temple at Peshawar was gunned down. Pakistan's Supreme Court has sought a report from the government on its efforts to ensure access for the minority Hindu community to temples – the Karachi bench of the apex court was hearing applications against the alleged denial of access to the members of the minority community.

==== Sikhs ====
The Sikh community of Pakistan has faced persecution in the form of targeted killings, forced conversions and denied opportunities. Sikhs have also been forced to pay the discriminatory jizya tax on non-Muslims. (This traditional Islamic tax was levied on non-Muslims allowing them to continue practicing their faith, but functioning as Protection racket extortion and is levied not by the state of Pakistan but by non-state actors, specifically extremist militants connected with the Taliban.) According to the Human Rights Commission of Pakistan, "several reports have been received of Sikhs being killed in public places for not paying this protection fee."

One result has been the emigration of a large fraction of Pakistan's Sikh population to safer countries, particularly India. According to human rights campaigners quoted in India Today, the population of Sikhs in Pakistan has dropped drastically, from 2 million in 1947 to around 40,000 in 2002 and 8,000 in 2019.

=== "Blasphemers" ===
From 1947 to 2021, 89 Pakistanis were "extra-judicially killed over blasphemy accusations". Among the victims (not for blaspheming but for speaking out against blasphemy laws or acquitting those accused) have been the Governor of Punjab, Pakistan's largest province (Salman Taseer), the Federal Minister for Minorities (Shahbaz Bhatti), and a high court justice in his chambers (Arif Iqbal Bhatti). Groups accused of blasphemy have not only been non-Muslim minorities and Ahmadiyya, but Shia Muslims. The sectarian group most strongly associated with "exploiting the emotive issue of blasphemy" is Labaik.

The Pakistan Penal Code, the main criminal code of Pakistan, penalizes blasphemy (Urdu: قانون ناموس رسالت) against any recognized religion, providing penalties ranging from a fine to death, but the penalty of death has never been carried out under these laws. What has happened is that many of those accused, their lawyers, and anyone speaking against blasphemy laws and proceedings have become victims of lynchings or street vigilantism in Pakistan.

According to human rights groups, blasphemy laws in Pakistan are "overwhelmingly being used to persecute religious minorities and settle personal vendettas," but calls for change in blasphemy laws have been strongly resisted by Islamic parties - most prominently the Barelvi school of Islam.

Among the most prominent cases was the 2011 assassination of Salman Taseer—the governor of Pakistan's largest province (Punjab) at the time and an outspoken critic of Pakistan's blasphemy laws. The year before several Barelvi clerics had given fatwas (religious decree) against Taseer, declaring him wajib-ul-qatal (worthy of death) arguing that he had blasphemed by criticising the blasphemy law and by seeking to obtain a presidential pardon for Asia Bibi, a poor farm worker and Christian who was sentenced to death for blasphemy after Muslim farm workers accused her of insulting Islam during an argument. Taseer was then killed by a man charged with protecting him, his police bodyguard (Mumtaz Qadri). Qadri's execution was greeted by "an outpouring of public sympathy" with protests held across the country and an estimated 100,000 attended his funeral, chanting slogans. The Sunni Ittehad Council, a Barelvi group, "glorified" Qadri, a Barelvi, as "an Islamic hero", and militant Barelvi groups found "the powerful message they had previously lacked for mobilising popular support". According to a former top counter-terrorism official quoted by International Crisis Group, Labaik’s success in politicizing blasphemy "is turning so many people into extremists".

More recently, in December 2021, a mob of about 800 in Sialkot, Punjab, set upon Priyantha Kumara, a Sri Lankan national and factory manager who had allegedly torn a poster inscribed with Islamic verses. The mob, which was affiliated with Tehreek-e-Labbaik Pakistan, believed this constituted blasphemy and tortured and bludgeoned to death Kumara before setting his remains on fire. Members of the mob proudly told media at the scene that it was a tribute to Muhammad.

During the Muharram of 2020, blasphemy accusations spread to the Shia population, particularly in Karachi. Section 295-A of the blasphemy law (in effect in the colonial era, before Pakistani independence), which punishes "deliberate and malicious acts intended to outrage religious feelings of any class by insulting its religion or religious beliefs", was sited to allege offences by Shia, including display of the seemingly benign "common Shia incantation", Ya Ali, (which calls on Ali but does not disparage any beloved by Sunnis) "on the front of a Shia family’s house".

== See also ==
- Sectarian violence among Muslims
- Iran-Saudi Arabia proxy conflict
- Islamic fundamentalism
- Religion in Pakistan
- Shia–Sunni relations
- Sufi–Salafi relations

== Bibliography ==
- A New Era of Sectarian Violence in Pakistan (PDF). International Crisis Group. 5 September 2022. Text was copied from this source, which is © 2023 Crisis Group. Reuse and modification are allowed, provided the source is acknowledged.
- Khaled Ahmad, "Sectarian War", Oxford University Press, (2015).
- Khan, Badal (2008). "Zikri Dilemmas: Origins, Religious practices, and political constraints". In Carina Jahani; Agnes Korn; Paul Titus (eds.). The Baloch and Others: Linguistic, Historical and Socio-Political Perspectives on Pluralism in Balochistan. pp. 293–326.
- Lieven, Anatol, Pakistan: A Hard Country, Penguin Books, (2012).
- Nasr, Vali (2006). The Shia Revival : How Conflicts Within Islam Will Shape the Future. Norton.
- Rieck, A., The Shias of Pakistan, Oxford University Press, (2015).
- Saif, Mashal. The 'Ulama in Contemporary Pakistan: Contesting and Cultivating an Islamic Republic. United Kingdom, Cambridge University Press, (2020).
