= June 2013 Quetta attacks =

Series of bombings in Quetta, Pakistan

- Part of the Balochistan conflict
- Quetta (Pakistan)
- Location: Quetta, Balochistan, Pakistan
- Date: 15 June 2013
- Target: Women's University students, Pakistan security forces
- Attack type: bombing, suicide bombing, shootings, siege
- Deaths: 26
- Injuries: 20+
- Perpetrator: Lashkar-e-Jhangvi

On 15 June 2013, a series of bombings resulted in the deaths of 26 people and injuries to dozens more in Quetta, in the Balochistan province of Pakistan. On the same day, separatist militants attacked and torched the historic Quaid-e-Azam Residency in Ziarat.

== Background ==
Quetta, a city in the south-west with a population of 900,000, has faced persistent violence, primarily directed at the Shia Muslim minority, frequently attributed to organizations like Laskar-e-Jhangvi.

In January 2013, a bombing at a snooker hall claimed the lives of at least 81 individuals, predominantly Shia Muslims. Similarly, in February, nearly 90 people perished in a bomb explosion at a marketplace located in a Hazara Shia area of the city.

== Attacks ==
The attacks began with the detonation of an explosive device attached to a bus carrying students from Sardar Bahadur Khan Women's University. The blast completely destroyed the vehicle, killing 14 women and injuring 19 others. A short time later, a suicide bomber struck at the nearby Bolan Medical Complex, where victims of the initial bombing were being treated. A team of five gunmen then forced its way into the compound, as senior Quetta political officials were visiting the injured, sparking an hours-long shootout with security forces. The attacks resulted in at least 12 casualties, including four attackers, four Pakistan Army soldiers and four hospital nurses. One of the gunmen survived the assault and was captured by government forces.

It is believed that the intended targets of the bus bombing were Shia from the Hazara ethnic minority, who have been the targets of previous sectarian attacks in Balochistan. However, due to an earlier change of route, the bus carried a more ethnically mixed group and has been described as "the wrong target" of the perpetrators.

== See also ==
- Human rights violations in Balochistan
- Quetta attacks
