= Quetta attack =

Quetta attack may refer to these attacks in Quetta, Balochistan, Pakistan during the insurgency in Balochistan:

== 2000s ==
- 2003 Quetta mosque bombing
- 2004 Quetta Ashura massacre

== 2010s ==
- 2010 Quetta Civil Hospital bombing
- September 2010 Quetta bombing
- 2011 Hazara Town shooting
- August 2011 Quetta bombing
- January 2013 Pakistan bombings
- February 2013 Quetta bombing
- June 2013 Quetta attacks
- August 2013 Quetta bombing
- 9 August 2013 Quetta shooting
- 2014 Quetta Airbase attack
- 2015 Quetta bus bombing
- 2016 Quetta suicide bombing (disambiguation)
  - January 2016 Quetta suicide bombing
  - August 2016 Quetta attacks
  - 2016 Quetta police training college attack
- June 2017 Pakistan attacks
- August 2017 Quetta suicide bombing
- 2017 Quetta church attack
- 2018 Quetta suicide bombing
- 2019 Quetta bombing

== 2020s ==
- January 2020 Quetta bombing
- February 2020 Quetta bombing
- April 2021 Quetta Serena Hotel bombing
- August 2021 Quetta bombing
- September 2021 Quetta bombing
- March 2022 Quetta bombing
- November 2022 Quetta bombing
- 2023 Kandahari Bazar bombing
- 2024 Quetta railway station bombing

== See also ==
- Quetta (disambiguation)
- Serena Hotel attack (disambiguation)
