= February 2013 Quetta bombing =

Market bombing in Balochistan, Pakistan

- Location: 30.1742°N 66.9636°E; Hazara Town, Quetta, Balochistan, Pakistan
- Date: 16 February 2013
- Attack type: Bombing
- Deaths: 91
- Injuries: 190
- Perpetrator: Lashkar-e-Jhangvi

On 16 February 2013, at least 91 people were killed and 190 injured after a bomb hidden in a water tank exploded at a market in Hazara Town on the outskirts of Quetta, the capital city of Balochistan, Pakistan. Most of the victims were members of the predominantly Twelver Shia Hazara community, and authorities expected the death toll to rise due to the large number of serious injuries. The Lashkar-e-Jhangvi group claimed responsibility for the blast, the second major attack against the Shia Hazaras in a month.

On 19 February, one of the masterminds of the attack was arrested and taken into custody along with 170 suspects, and four high-profile militants accused of killing Shia civilians were killed during an operation by the security forces. Weapons, ammunition and bomb-making materials were seized during the operation.

== Background ==
Acts of violence involving Sunni Muslims and their Shia counterparts in Pakistan have been evident since the 1980s. They are generally considered to have arisen from attempts by the then national leader, Zia ul-Haq, to legitimise his military dictatorship and from the influx of weapons into the country following the Soviet invasion of Afghanistan. Although the perpetrators often do not claim responsibility for the attacks, expert analysis suggests that in recent times it is the Sunnis who are dominating the aggression and that they are motivated by the ideology of al-Qaeda. The number of violent incidents has been increasing in recent years, although not all of them are classified by the police as being sectarian attacks.

Quetta, which is the capital of the Pakistani province of Balochistan, has suffered many of these violent incidents. This is in part because of a separatist movement involving militants from the Balochistan Liberation Army who demand greater autonomy and also because the Pakistani military is engaged in counter-insurgency operations near the province's border with Afghanistan, where there is tribal strife that involves the Taliban and allied groups.

Similarly, the January 2013 bombings in Quetta killed 130 people and caused widespread anger, leading to the dismissal of the provincial government.

== Bombing ==
The bomb went off in a market area with many grocery stores, several language schools and a large computer centre. It took place towards the end of the market day, as many people shopped for food and children left school. According to Quetta's police chief Mir Zubair Mehmood, around 70–80 kg of explosives had been planted inside a water tank that had been installed on a tractor trailer.

Initial reports suggested the bomb had been attached to a parked motorbike. The blast dealt severe damage to buildings in the area, destroying at least one two-story house and trapping many under rubble. Sporadic gunfire was reported after the attack, and locals were reportedly hesitant to approach the site in the immediate aftermath for fear of more bombs. Angry members of the Hazara minority set up roadblocks with burning tires and fired into the air in order to keep people away from the blast site in case of a second attack. Photos from the scene showed groups of desperate people rushing the injured into ambulances and private vehicles, as emergency services quickly became overloaded. Nevertheless, police forces worked throughout the evening and into the night, with the death toll being updated several times due to more bodies being pulled out from beneath rubble.

== Perpetrator ==
It is expected that the al-Qaeda-affiliated Sunni Muslim extremist group, Lashkar-e-Jhangvi (LeJ), was behind the attacks on the Hazara minority in the region. There are differences of opinion regarding whether LeJ is a breakaway group of a banned former political party, Sipah-e-Sahaba, or is its armed wing. The LeJ openly issues death threats to Hazaras through newspaper ads and describes them as wajib-ul-qatl (deserving of death).

== Reactions ==
=== Domestic reactions ===
Immediately after the attack, Pakistani President Asif Ali Zardari and Prime Minister Raja Pervez Ashraf both released statements strongly condemning the bombing, while also vowing to go after the culprits.

Hazara leaders refused to bury their dead, giving a 48-hour ultimatum to the government to launch an operation and also demanded handing over the city to the Army. Protests were held countrywide in the aftermath of the blast, with about 1500 marchers reported on the streets of Lahore and protests in Muzaffarabad and Multan. Zulfikar Ali Magsi, the Governor of Balochistan Province, criticized Pakistan's security forces regarding the violence, stating. "Our security institutions, police, FC and others are either scared or cannot take action against them".

We demand that a special court be set up and the culprits be punished.

— Imran Khan, chairman of Pakistan Tehreek-e-Insaf,

During a Senate session in Islamabad, numerous lawmakers staged a walkout to protest the government's failure in addressing the "root causes" of terror. The Shia Ulema Council of Pakistan observed a strike in Karachi through a peaceful sit-in. Political parties, including the Pakistan Muslim League (N), Muttahida Qaumi Movement and Majlis-e-Wahdat-e-Muslimeen among others raised the incompetency of the government and called for swift action to be taken. On his official Twitter account, Pakistan Tehreek-e-Insaf chairman Imran Khan expressed being "disturbed and saddened" by the killings and strongly condemned the Lashkar-e-Jhangvi, demanding the LeJ culprits who were behind the attack be punished, while adding that members of his party would hold protests to express solidarity with the Hazara people.

Action should have been taken against Lashkar-e-Jhangvi (LeJ) long time ago.

— Iftikhar Muhammad Chaudhry, Chief Justice of Pakistan,

The Supreme Court of Pakistan took suo moto notice of the incident on 18 February and scheduled an open hearing the following day, in which the Balochistan Advocate General and Attorney General of Pakistan would be summoned. At the hearing, Chief Justice of Pakistan Iftikhar Muhammad Chaudhry remarked that an operation should have been conducted against the Lashkar-e-Jhangvi a long time ago. While pointing to the failure of intelligence agencies, Chaudhry also questioned how the attacks had taken place despite the heavy presence of Frontier Corps in Quetta.

=== International reactions ===
The Foreign Minister of Iran, Ali Akbar Salehi, also denounced the attack, and called it a "criminal act which only serves the interest of the enemies of the Pakistani nation."

United Nations Secretary-General Ban Ki-moon strongly condemned the blast and called for "swift and determined action against those claiming responsibility and perpetrating such actions" while reiterating "strong support" from the United Nations for "efforts by the Government and people of Pakistan to protect religious and ethnic minorities and to combat the scourge of terrorism."

=== Crackdown against Lashkar-e-Jhangvi ===
Raja Pervaiz Ashraf announced a "targeted operation" in Quetta aimed against the culprits. Ashraf also removed the Inspector general of Balochistan Umer Khitab from his post. A six-man parliamentary group arrived in Quetta to inspect the post-attack situation and hold talks with the affected Hazara community.

On 19 February, security forces killed four high-profile targets accused of killing Shia civilians and arrested 170 suspects during an operation. Among the arrested men was one of the masterminds of the Hazara Town attack. The operation was conducted on the outskirts of Quetta and "bomb-making material, weapons, suicide vests and ammunition" were retrieved by intelligence and paramilitary officials during the exercise, however there was no official verification of this information.

== See also ==
- Human rights violations in Balochistan
- Quetta attacks
- January 2013 Pakistan bombings
