= August 2017 Quetta suicide bombing =

Terrorist attack in Quetta, Pakistan

- Part of War in North-West Pakistan
- Quetta (Balochistan, Pakistan) Quetta (Pakistan)
- Location: 30°12′13.17″N 67°0′16.09″E; Quetta, Balochistan, Pakistan
- Date: 12 August 2017
- Target: Pakistan army
- Attack type: Suicide bombing
- Weapons: Explosive belt, Incendiary device
- Deaths: 15 (+1 bomber)
- Injuries: 40
- Victims: 8 soldiers and 7 civilians
- Perpetrator: Islamic State – Khorasan Province (claimed)
- No. of participants: 1
- Motive: Derailment of Pakistan Independence Day celebration

On 12 August 2017, a suicide bombing took place near a Pakistan army truck in Quetta, Balochistan, Pakistan, leaving 15 people dead including 8 soldiers, while injuring 40 others. The Islamic State of Iraq and the Levant – Khorasan Province claimed responsibility for the attack.

== Background ==
The attack came three days after lawyers in Quetta ended a three-day (7-9 Aug) strike on the first anniversary of a suicide attack that killed several lawyers. The attack followed three previous attacks in the city in 2017, on 13 February, on 21 April and on 23 June. The attack came just two days before Pakistan's 71st Independence Day.

According to Dawn, at the end of July a security alert had been issued stating that an explosive-laden vehicle had entered Quetta and an attack could occur in a market or a crowded place.

== Bombing ==
On the evening of 12 August 2017, a suicide bomber riding on an explosives-rigged motorcycle blew himself up near an on-duty Pakistan army patrol truck which was passing through Pishin bus stop on the Khojak Road, Quetta in Pakistan's southwestern province Balochistan.

Since the suicide vest contained incendiary explosives, several nearby vehicles caught fire. The explosion was so loud that it was heard all across the city and windowpanes of nearby buildings were shattered by the impact of the blast. After collecting forensic evidence, Bomb Disposal Squad's Kabeer Khan said that 20–25 kilograms of explosives were used in the attack. According to the Director-General Civil Defence Aslam Tareen, the explosives were packed with ball bearings to inflict maximum casualties. At least 15 people including 8 Pakistan army soldiers, were killed while 40 others were injured in the attack. According to Balochistan Home Minister, Sarfaraz Bugti, many bodies were burnt beyond recognition adding that the patrol may have been the target.

The blast occurred near Ayub National Stadium where celebrations to mark the 70th anniversary of Pakistan's independence had been under way since 11 August.

== Aftermath ==
Immediately after the explosion, three fire tenders reached the spot and fire fighters engaged in overcoming the fire. Four cars, four auto-rickshaws and two motorcycles were engulfed in flames. The area was cordoned off which is in close proximity of the Balochistan Assembly and Quetta Law College. Security officials reached the site and started a search operation. The injured were taken to Civil Hospital and Combined Military Hospital in Quetta. The condition of seven injured was declared critical. Following the attack, a state-of-emergency had been imposed in the city and holidays for all doctors in the city were suspended.

A high-level investigation team, comprising three senior police officers had been formed to probe the attack. The Chief of the Army Staff Qamar Bajwa and Interior Minister Ahsan Iqbal attended the funeral prayers of the slain soldiers and also visited the injured at the hospital.

== Responsibility ==
Islamic State of Iraq and the Levant – Khorasan Province released a statement claiming the attack, according to the US-based monitoring group SITE. The statement said that a suicide motorbike bomber was behind the blast.

== Reactions ==
=== Domestic ===
President of Pakistan Mamnoon Hussain condemned the attack and directed the authorities concerned to extend all possible assistance to the injured and others affected by the incident. Further resolving that the terrorists would be apprehended and brought to justice. Prime Minister of Pakistan Shahid Khaqan Abbasi, in a statement said: "We will continue to work to eliminate the menace of terrorism from our country". Former Prime Minister Nawaz Sharif, Minister of Information Marriyum Aurangzeb and Chief Minister of Balochistan Sanaullah Zehri also condemned the blast.

Speaker of National Assembly Ayaz Sadiq condemned the attack saying, "Strongly condemn Pishin Stop blast. Deepest condolences to the bereaved families & prayers for the speedy recovery of those injured". CM KPK Pervaiz Khatak in a tweet said, "strongly condemn bomb blast near Pishin Stop in #Quetta and express my deepest grief on loss of precious lives". CM Punjab Shehbaz Sharif said, "Just heard a bad news of bomb blast in Quetta .... Ya Allah Khair!". Director General ISPR Asif Ghafoor in a tweet said, "COAS condemns terrorist attack on Army truck in Quetta, an attempt to mar Indep Day festivity. Our resolve won't succumb to any challenge". A number of people including Pakistan Tehreek-e-Insaf's chief Imran Khan and cricketer Mohammad Hafeez also tweeted and condemned the incident.

=== International ===
- Saudi Arabia: A Saudi Foreign Ministry official condemned the attack while reiterating Saudi solidarity with Pakistan in combating terrorism and extremism.
- United States: US embassy in Islamabad tweeted, "We condemn the senseless attack on Pakistani military and civilians that occurred last night in Quetta".

== See also ==
- Terrorist incidents in Pakistan in 2017
- Quetta attacks
