= August 2011 Quetta bombing =

Terrorist incident in Pakistan

- Part of War in North-West Pakistan
- Location: Quetta, Pakistan
- Date: August 30, 2011
- Target: Mosque
- Weapon: Car bomb
- Deaths: 11
- Injuries: 20

The August 2011 Quetta bombing refers to a suicide car bomb attack in Quetta mosque that left 11 Shia Muslims dead and 20 more injured on August 30, 2011. The victims were leaving their place of worship after Eid prayers when the bomb went off at the parking lot. Ahsan Mahboob, a Pakistani Capital City Police Officer, said that the bomb had 40 kilograms (88 lb) of explosives. Besides dead and injured, which were transported to the Civil Hospital and Bolan Medical College, the bomb also destroyed 10 cars along with a few houses. No one claimed responsibility for the attack. After the blast there was police cordoning and mourning. The mourning was announced by Quetta Azadari Council which lasted for the whole week. It was then followed by condemnation of attack from both JAP President Allama Abbas Kumaili and Hazara Democratic Party.

== See also ==
- Quetta attacks
