= Quetta (disambiguation) =

Quetta is the capital city of the Pakistani province of Balochistan.

Quetta may also refer to:

== Places ==
- related to Quetta, Pakistan:
  - Quetta District, the district
  - Quetta Division, the third-tier administrative subdivision
  - Quetta Cantonment, a military cantonment in Quetta
- Quetta, Queensland, a locality in Queensland, Australia

== Other uses ==
- quetta-, a metric prefix denoting a factor of 10^{30}
- Quetta: A City of Forgotten Dreams, a 2016 Pakistani drama film
- RMS Quetta, a merchant ship that wrecked in 1890

== See also ==
- Quetta attack (disambiguation)
- Quetta Gladiators, a cricket team in the Pakistan Super League
