= Kabul Serena Hotel attack =

Kabul Serena Hotel attack may refer to these attacks by the Taliban at the Kabul Serena Hotel:

- 2008 Kabul Serena Hotel attack
- 2014 Kabul Serena Hotel attack

== See also ==
- Serena Hotel attack (disambiguation)
