= Serena Hotel attack =

Serena Hotel attack may refer to these attacks by the Taliban at Serena Hotels:

- 2008 Kabul Serena Hotel attack, Afghanistan
- 2014 Kabul Serena Hotel shooting, Afghanistan
- Quetta Serena Hotel bombing, Pakistan

== See also ==
- August 2021 Quetta bombing, two blasts by the Balochistan Liberation Army in Quetta, Pakistan, one near the Quetta Serena Hotel
- Kabul Serena Hotel attack (disambiguation)
- Quetta attack (disambiguation)
