= February 2020 Quetta bombing =

Terrorist incident in Pakistan

- Location: Quetta, Balochistan, Pakistan
- Date: 17 February 2020
- Attack type: Suicide bombing
- Weapon: Bomb
- Deaths: 10 (including 2 police)
- Injuries: 35

On 17 February 2020, a suicide bombing occurred in Quetta, Balochistan, Pakistan. The attacker was on a motorcycle and detonated his bomb as police tried to stop him entering a Sunni extremist religious rally near a press club. At least 10 people - including two police officers - were killed and another 35 people were injured.

No one has claimed responsibility for the attack. Quetta is frequently attacked by Sunni Islamists as well as by Baloch separatist insurgents.

== See also ==
- January 2020 Quetta bombing
- Quetta attacks
