= Therhi massacre =

1963 massacre of Shias in Pakistan

Therhi Massacre
- Part of Sectarian violence in Pakistan
- Therhi (Pakistan)
- Location: Therhi, Sindh, Pakistan
- Date: 3 June 1963
- Target: Shias
- Attack type: Mass murder
- Weapons: Meat cleavers and Machetes
- Deaths: 118
- Perpetrator: A Deobandi madrassa of Therhi
- Motive: Sectarianism

The Therhi massacre was a mass murder that occurred on 3 June 1963 in Therhi, Sindh, Pakistan. In it, 118 Shia Muslims were killed by a mob of Sunni Deobandi Muslims. Although it was not the first incident of violence against the Shia Muslims of Pakistan, this attack is considered to be the first major massacre of civilians in the Sindh.

== Background ==
=== Legacy of Syed Ahmad Barelvi ===
Syed Ahmad Barelvi and Shah Ismail Dehlvi were pioneers of anti-Shia terrorism in the subcontinent. Barbara Metcalf says:

"A second group of Abuses Syed Ahmad held were those that originated from Shi’i influence. He particularly urged Muslims to give up the keeping of ta’ziyahs. The replicas of the tombs of the martyrs of Karbala taken in procession during the mourning ceremony of Muharram. Muhammad Isma’il wrote,

‘a true believer should regard the breaking of a tazia by force to be as virtuous an action as destroying idols. If he cannot break them himself, let him order others to do so. If this even be out of his power, let him at least detest and abhor them with his whole heart and soul’.

Sayyid Ahmad himself is said, no doubt with considerable exaggeration, to have torn down thousands of imambaras, the building that house the taziyahs".

These attacks were carried out between 1818 and 1820. Rizvi has given more details about time, places and circumstances in which these attacks were carried out. After their death in Balakot in 1831 while being chased by Maharaja Ranjit Singh's army, their legacy of sectarian terrorism continued in the Deoband school of thought. Data shows that around 90 percent of religious terrorists in Pakistan are Deobandis by faith and many of them belong to the Pashtun belt (the area where Syed Ahmad carried out his military endeavor).

=== The Lucknow Riots ===
Anti-Shia violence reached its peak during the Madhe Sahaba agitation of Lucknow in 1936 - 1937. The main religious centers of Muslims in that time were located in the United Provinces, therefore, the sectarian violence spread all over India. Azadari in UP was no more peaceful; it would never be the same again. Violence went so far that on Ashura 1940, a Deobandi terrorist attacked the Ashura procession with a bomb. Hollister writes:

"Conflicts between Sunnis and Shias at Muharram are not infrequent. Processions in the cities are accompanied by police along fixed lines of march. The following quotations from a single newspaper are not usual. They indicate what might happen if the government did not keep the situation under control: ‘adequate measures avert incidents’, ‘Muharram passed off peacefully’, ‘All shops remained closed in . . . in order to avoid incidents’, ‘Several women offered satyagraha in front of the final procession . . . about twenty miles from Allahabad. They object to the passing of the procession through their fields’, ‘the police took great precautions to prevent a breach of the peace’, ‘as a sequel to the cane charge by the police on a Mehndi procession the Moslems . . . did not celebrate the Muharram today. No ta’zia processions were taken out . . . Business was transacted as usual in the Hindu localities’, ‘Bomb thrown on procession’. Not all of these disturbances spring from sectarian differences, but those differences actuate many fracases. Birdwood says that, in Bombay, where the first four days of Muharram are likely to be devoted to visiting each other's tabut khanas, women and children, as well as men, are admitted, and members of other communities – only the Sunnies are denied ‘simply as a police precaution’".

The main purpose of the army of Sahaba had been achieved: Shias and Sunnis were segregated as Azadari was not safe anymore.

Congress wanted to use the sectarian card against Jinnah, who was a Shia, but the more Congress supported the religio-fascists ulema, the more it alienated her from the Muslims and the more the League became popular. The sectarian activities started to fire back. Deobandi ulema was becoming infamous and Muslim masses were disgusted with what the Muslim league interpreted as ‘divide-and-rule’ policy of Congress. With the Pakistan movement gaining momentum, Muslims put their differences aside and started to respond to the Muslim League’s call of Muslim Unity and establishment of a separate homeland. Now Deobandi ulema changed tactics: in 1944 they established a separate organization to do the dirty work, Tanzim-e-Ahle-Sunnat, solely focused on the anti-Shia violence and the main leaders like Madani started to present themselves as inclusive secularists again. The irony is that the same nationalistic secular ulema were writing fake history about Akbar being the cursed infidel and Shaikh Ahmad Sirhindi being a notable opposition to his secularism. Archives and history books of Mughal period have lots of material about opposition leaders, e.g. Shiva Ji, but there is no mention of Ahmad Sirhindi. It was Molana Azad who first crafted a hero out of Ahmad Sirhindi and later this fabrication was carried on by all Deobandi historians. Some others, like Shabbir Ahmad Usmani, joined the League and when failed to snatch leadership from Jinnah, formed a new party in 1946, Jamiat Ulema-i-Islam (JUI) which would become the first opposition party after the foundation of Pakistan.

=== Violence migrates to Pakistan ===
After the demise of Jinnah in mysterious circumstances, the feudal prime minister, Nawabzada Liaquat Ali Khan, allied with Deobandi ulema and passed the Objectives Resolution and adopted the puritanical Wahhabism as state religion. Jinnah’s appointed law minister, Jogendra Nath Mandal, resigned from his post. Shias allege discrimination by the Pakistani government since 1948, claiming that Sunnis are given preference in business, official positions and administration of justice. Although the sectarian hateful literature had been pouring into Punjab since Shah Abd al-Aziz wrote his Tuhfa Asna Ashariya, however, anti-Shia violence began only after mass migration in 1947. Many students of Molana Abdul Shakoor Farooqi and Molana Hussain Ahmad Madani migrated to Pakistan and either set up seminaries here or became part of the Tanzim-e-Ahle-Sunnat (TAS) or Jamiat Ulema-i-Islam (JUI). They travelled through the length and breadth of the country and called for attacks on Azadari and wrote books and tracts against it. Among them were: Molana Noorul Hasan Bukhari, Molana Dost Muhammad Qureshi, Molana Abdus Sattar Taunsavi, Molana Mufti Mahmood, Molana Abdul Haq Haqqani, Molana Sarfaraz Khan Safdar Gakharvi, and Molana Manzoor Ahmad Naumani. The sectarian clashes of Lucknow had attracted zealous workers of religious parties from Punjab and KPK, but with influx of sectarian clergy, the religious sectarianism and narrow-mindedness of UP was injected to Sufism-oriented Punjab and Sindh.

In the 1950s, Tanzim-e-Ahle-Sunnat started to arrange public gatherings all over Pakistan to incite violence and mock Shia sanctities. TAS issued an anti-Shia monthly, called Da’wat. In Muharram 1955, attacks took place on at least 25 places in Punjab. In 1956, thousands of armed villagers gathered to attack Azadari in the small town of Shahr Sultan, but were stopped by Police from killing. On 7 August 1957, three Shias were killed during an attack in Sitpur village. TAS demanded that government should ban the thousand years old tradition of Azadari, because it caused rioting and bloodshed. In May 1958, a Shia orator Agha Mohsin was killed in a targeted attack in Bhakkar. Police needed to be appointed to many places, the scenario became more like in the pre-partition Urdu Speaking areas. The Shia ulema were becoming part of religious alliances and not supporting secularism. The syllabus taught at Shia seminaries does not include any course on the history of the subcontinent. Shia clerics don't have an independent political vision: they were strengthening the puritanism which was going to deprive Shias of basic human rights, like equality, peace and freedom.

Ayyub Khan enforced Martial Law in 1958. In the 1960s, Shias started to face state persecution when Azadari processions were banned at some places and the ban was lifted only after protests. In Lahore, the main procession of Mochi gate was forced to change its route. After Martial Law was lifted in 1962, anti-Shia hate propaganda started again, both in the form of books and weekly papers. The Deobandi organisation Tanzim-e-Ahle-Sunnat demanded the Azadari to be limited to Shia ghetto's. Following Muharram, on 3 June 1963, two Shias were killed and over a hundred injured in an attack on Ashura procession in Lahore.

== The incident ==
On the day of Ashura on 3 June 1963, Shias of Therhi village attempted to carry a Taziya. When this news reached the nearby Deobandi madrasa of Khairpur, students of Madrassa went to Therhi and burned both Taziya and Imambargah. Many people were burnt alive and others were butchered with meat cleavers and machetes.

The press did not cover the incidents properly, as the identity of both the perpetrators and the victims was concealed. On 16 June, six Deobandi organisations arranged a public meeting in Lahore, where they blamed the victims for the violence. In July, a commission was appointed to investigate the riots. Its report was published in December of that year, but it did not name any individuals or organisations. Nobody was punished.

== Aftermath ==
In 1969, Ashura procession was attacked in Jhang. On 26 February 1972, Ashura procession was stone pelted on in Dera Ghazi Khan. In May 1973, the Shia neighbourhood of Gobindgarh in Sheikhupura district was attacked by Deobandi mob. There were troubles in Parachinar and Gilgit too. In 1974, Shia villages were attacked in Gilgit by armed Deobandi men. January 1975 saw several attacks on Shia processions in Karachi, Lahore, Chakwal and Gilgit. In a village Babu Sabu near Lahore, three Shias were killed and many were left injured.

On the other hand, Mufti Mahmood, Molana Samiul Haq, Ihsan Illahi Zaheer and others wrote and spoke furiously against Shias.

== International reactions ==
The global Shia religious leader of the time, Grand Ayatollah Muhsin al-Hakim, wrote a letter to President Mohammad Ayub Khan expressing his strong condemnation of the act.

== See also ==
- Shia Islam
- Shia Islam in the Indian subcontinent
- Anti-Shi'ism
- Persecution of Hazara people
- Sipah-e-Sahaba Pakistan
- Taraaj-e Shia
