= January 2020 Quetta bombing =

2020 suicide bombing in Quetta, Pakistan

- Part of the insurgency in Balochistan and War on Terror in Pakistan
- Location of incidents shown in map of Pakistan
- Location: Quetta, Balochistan, Pakistan
- Date: 10 January 2020
- Target: Taliban-run mosque
- Attack type: Suicide bombing
- Weapon: Suicide vest
- Deaths: 15 (+1 suicide bomber)
- Injuries: 19+
- Perpetrator: Islamic State – Pakistan Province

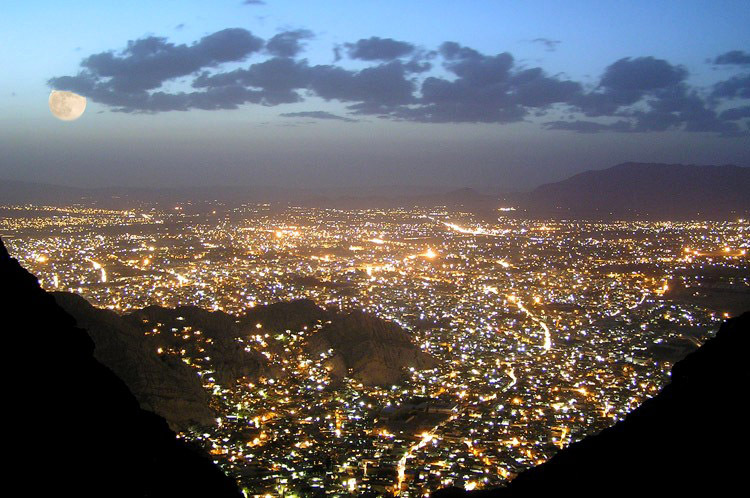
Quetta, capital of Baluchistan, Pakistan, at night

On 10 January 2020, a suicide bombing inside a Taliban-run mosque killed at least 15 people in Quetta, Pakistan. At least 19 others were injured.

== Background ==
Earlier, on 7 January 2020, a motorcycle bombing took place near a Frontier Corps vehicle on McConaghey Road near Liaquat Bazar in Quetta. The attack killed two people and injured another 14 others. According to reports, Jamaat-ul-Ahrar as well as Baloch terrorists claimed responsibility for the attack.

== Bombing ==
On 10 January 2020, a suicide bombing took place inside a Taliban-run mosque located in Ghousabad neighbourhood during Maghrib prayer in Quetta's Satellite Town area. The bomb had been planted inside a seminary in the mosque. Among the killed was a Deputy Superintendent of Police, the apparent target of the attack, along with 14 civilians. At least 19 others were injured. The Islamic State claimed responsibility for the bombing. They said the bombing caused 60 casualties, including 20 dead.

== Response ==
Bomb disposal squad and security personnel swept through the mosque and its surrounding area for evidence. The area was cordoned off and Frontier Corps personnel along with the police carried out a search operation. On 11 January 2020, a first information report was registered by the Counter Terrorism Department against unknown suspects.

== See also ==
- February 2020 Quetta bombing
- Quetta attacks
