= Sardar Bahadur Khan Women's University =

University in Balochistan, Pakistan

- جامع خواتین سردار بہادر خان سردار بہادر خان زن دانشگاہ د سردار بهادر خان د ښځو پوهنتون دانشگاه نسوان سردار بهادر خان
- Motto: رَبِّ زدْنيِ عِلْماً
- Motto in English: O' God, Increase my Knowledge
- Type: Public university
- Established: 2004
- Affiliations: Higher Education Commission of Pakistan
- Chancellor: Governor of Balochistan
- Vice-Chancellor: Dr. Rubina Mushtaq
- Students: 8000
- Location: Quetta, Balochistan, Pakistan
- Campus: Urban 200 acres (0.81 km^{2})
- Colours: Blue, Amber, White
- Nickname: SBKians
- Website: www.sbkwu.edu.pk

Sardar Bahadur Khan Women's University is a women's university in Quetta, Balochistan, Pakistan. It was established in 2004.

The university offers degree programs in Arts and Sciences. It is named for the former agent to the Governor General of Pakistan and Chief Commissioner of Balochistan, Sardar Bahadur Khan who was also brother of former President of Pakistan, Muhammad Ayub Khan.

== History ==
It was inaugurated on 18 March 2004 and Masters degree programs were started by May 2004. The Bachelor of Science program for sciences was started in 2005. The first convocation was held in the middle of 2006.

The campus area is about 160,000 square metres (40 acres), including a hostel facility and a library.

=== Convocation speech ===
Women education occupies great significance for the development of our society, because women are 51 percent of our population; they cannot be ignored in the development of the country.

This was stated by Balochistan Governor Nawab Zulfiqar Ali Khan Magsi while addressing 5th convocation of Sardar Bahadur Khan Women's University.

=== Bomb attack ===
As part of the June 2013 Quetta attacks carried out by Lashkar-e-Jhangvi, a bus carrying students from the university was attacked with an explosive device. The resulting explosion killed 14 women and injured 19 others.

== Academics ==
- Faculty of Life Sciences
- Faculty of Basic Sciences
- Faculty of Social Sciences
- Faculty of Management & Computer Sciences
- Faculty of Humanities
