= Quaid-e-Azam Residency attack =

Terrorist attack on Quaid residency in Ziarat, Balochistan in 2013

- Part of due to the Balochistan conflict
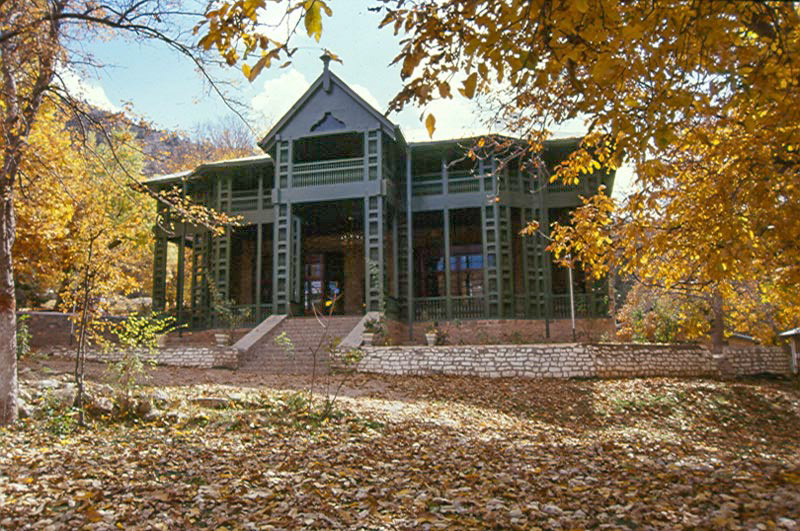
- Quaid-e-Azam Residency, Ziarat, Pakistan
- Location: 30°22′50.64″N 67°43′45″E
- Date: 15 June 2013; 1:15 AM (PST)
- Target: Memorials in Quaid-e-Azam Residency
- Attack type: soft
- Weapons: Hand grenades and Rockets and crains
- Deaths: 1 Pakistani policeman
- Injuries: 1 Pakistani policeman
- Perpetrator: Balochistan Liberation Army

On 15 June 2013, the historical Quaid-e-Azam Residency, which housed the founder of Pakistan, Quaid-e-Azam Muhammad Ali Jinnah, in the last two months and ten days of his life, was attacked and torched by militants of the Balochistan Liberation Army. The Ziarat Residency was reconstructed and inaugurated on Pakistan's Independence Day, 14 August 2014.

== Attack ==
Four to five terrorists riding on two motorcycles attacked the heritage site immediately after midnight on 15 June 2013. They fired three rockets from an unknown location, then stormed the building using assault rifles and hand grenades. A policeman identified as Muhammad Tahir Jan and two unarmed watchmen were killed during the initial assault. The attackers then moved inside and planted more than six bombs. They took down the Pakistani flag from the building and replaced it with the flag of BLA. The militants escaped after setting the building alight.

After the attack fire fighters were called in from Quetta who extinguished the blaze after a four-hour struggle, but the building had completely burned down. Six of the bombs planted inside the residency were defused by the bomb disposal squad, who reported that each bomb weighed 2 to 3 kilograms.

== Investigations ==
The interior Minister of Pakistan, Chaudhry Nisar presented the preliminary investigation report of the attack in the National Assembly of Pakistan on the same day. He reported that firing and five explosions occurred on the residency premises at approximately 1:15 am.

The Frontier Corps and the law enforcement authorities also started investigations of the incident.

== Aftermath ==
According to initial reports by the police, the attack resulted in complete destruction of all the old memorials housed in the residency. The chairs, beds, and historic photographs of the founder of Pakistan were also badly damaged.

== Reactions ==
=== Domestic ===
- The Chief Minister of Sindh, Syed Qaim Ali Shah strongly condemned the terrorist attack. He termed the attack "a national tragedy", demanded investigations of the incident and asked for "stern action" to be taken against the perpetrators.

The Governor of Sindh Ishrat-ul-Ibad Khan condemned the rocket attack on the residency. He expressed "deep grief and sorrow" over the attack and termed it as "an attack on the whole nation". He also sympathised with the families of the victims.

- (Balochistan, Pakistan) The Chief Minister of Balochistan, Abdul Malik Baloch strongly condemned the act and stated that the "perpetrators of the attack would be brought to book". He called for a day of mourning to be observed across Balochistan on June 16, 2013.
- On 16 June, the Senate of Pakistan unanimously passed a resolution on Saturday condemning the terrorist attack on the Residency. The resolution was moved by the Leader of the House Raja Zafarul Haq.
- Several political leaders condemned terrorists’ attack on the Residency. In their statements PTI Chief Imran Khan, Punjab Chief Minister Shahbaz Sharif, PPP leader Khursheed Shah and MQM leader Altaf Hussain condemned the attack on Ziarat Residency.
- The Prime Minister of Pakistan, Nawaz Sharif also condemned the attack, and expressed sorrow and grief over the casualties. He announced that all measures will be taken to ensure the safety and security of national assets and heritage sites in future.

=== Foreign ===
- (United Nations) UN Secretary General Ban Ki-moon condemned the deadly attacks in Ziarat and Quetta. In a statement issued by his spokesman, he stated that "no cause can justify such violence". The secretary-general also extended his condolences to the victims and their families, as well as the government of Pakistan.

== Reconstruction ==
The Chief Minister of Balochistan, Abdul Malik Baloch assured that Jinnah's residence would be restored in its original condition. He stated that he will even call foreign experts to restore the Ziarat residency in its original form.

On June 16, 2013, the Federal Interior Minister Chaudhry Nisar Ali Khan flew to Ziarat and announced to rebuild the Residency within three to four months as it was a national heritage. He stated “We are with the terror-hit people of Balochistan at this time of grief. We will also extend our support to the provincial government”.

The reconstruction work was completed within the next four months and the reconstructed Ziarat Residency was inaugurated on August 14, 2014.

== Response ==
DG ISPR General Asim Bajwa, during a press conference on September 12, 2013, said that all militants who participated in the attack had been captured by the army during Operation Zarb-e-Azab.
