= Therhi =

Therhi (Habibabad)
- Location within Sindh
- Coordinates: 27°35′12″N 68°46′43″E
- Country: Pakistan
- Province: Sindh
- District: Khairpur
- Time zone: UTC+5 (GMT+5)
- Dialing code: 0243

Therhi is a town and Union Council in Khairpur District, Sindh province, Pakistan.

The town is 7 kilometers away from Khairpur City, in the direction of Sukkur via the National Highway.

The town is known for dates and dry dates which are mainly produced by Memon community.

== See also ==
- Therhi Massacre
