= 2016 Quetta suicide bombing =

2016 Quetta suicide bombing or 2016 Quetta attack may refer to:

== January 2016 Quetta Suicide Bombing ==
=== Incident ===
At least 70 people, among them 13 Police personnel, a FC soldier and a civilian, were killed while 120 others were injured when suicide bomber blew himself up near a Government health centre in Satellite Town area of Quetta.

== August 2016 Suicide Bombing ==
On 8 August, a suicide bombing occurred in Quetta, Pakistan at a hospital which injured over 100 and killed 70 more.

=== Incident ===
Earlier in the day Bilal Anwar Kasi president of Balochistan Bar Association, was attacked on the morning of 8 August near Mengal Chowk on Manno Jan Road while leaving his home for his office. His body was transported to the hospital for an autopsy and many people gathered at the hospital, many which were lawyers. A suicide bombing exploded inside of the hospital which led to much gunfire outside of the hospital which left many people injured or dead and about half of the fatalities and injuries were people that were lawyers. The Islamic State News Agency reported that ISIS had taken responsibility for the attack.

=== Reaction ===
The prime minister Nawaz Sharif addressed the attack and announced a three-day mourning period for Pakistan. Mehmood Khan Achakzai Chief of Pashtoonkhwa Milli Awami Party called for Joint Sitting of the Parliament to discuss and revisit interior and foreign policies to cope with scourge of terrorism. he stressed the need to make the parliament an origin of power and making a joint front to effectively fight the menace of terrorism. He requested the government to declare it an attack on Pakistan like the USA had declared attacks on twin towers in New York an attack on America within five minutes.
