= January 2013 Pakistan bombings =

2013 terror attacks in Quetta, Balochistan, Pakistan

- Part of Insurgency in Balochistan; Insurgency in Khyber Pakhtunkhwa
- Location: Alamdar Road, Quetta, Balochistan, Pakistan
- Date: 10 January 2013
- Attack type: Bombings
- Deaths: 142
- Injuries: At least 270
- Perpetrators: United Baloch Army (1st attack); Lashkar-e-Jhangvi (2nd and 3rd attack)

On 10 January 2013, several bombings took place in the southwestern Pakistani city of Quetta, the capital of Balochistan, killing a total of 130 people and injuring at least 270. The Quetta bombings led to protests by the city's Shia Muslim Hazara community; Prime Minister of Pakistan Raja Pervez Ashraf responded by dismissing the Chief Minister of Balochistan, Aslam Raisani, and replacing him with Zulfikar Ali Magsi. On the same day, a bomb exploded in Swat District, Khyber Pakhtunkhwa, killing 22 people and injuring 60 others.

== Background ==
Since the government's operation to end a private fundamentalist militia's occupation of Lal Masjid in the national capital of Islamabad, there has been a growing insurgency by the Islamist Pakistani Taliban and others, especially in the Federally Administered Tribal Areas, bordering and resultant from Operation Enduring Freedom in Afghanistan, and Khyber Pakhtunkhwa. Additionally, the insurgency in Balochistan, predominantly by the Balochistan Liberation Army, had been ongoing prior to this period; while there has also been deadly sectarianism in Pakistan.

== Bombings ==
=== Quetta ===
Three bombs exploded in the city of Quetta, one early in the day and two in the evening. The first bomb, which went off in the city's commercial district near a public plaza and crowded food markets, killed twelve people and injured 47; a Baloch separatist group, the United Baloch Army, claimed responsibility. Police official Hamid Shakil said that "Frontier Corps personnel were the target because the bomb was planted underneath their vehicle," though mostly civilians were killed.

The deadliest attack came later in the day, when a suicide bomber blew himself up inside a snooker hall at about 8:50 pm, followed about ten minutes later by a car bombing outside the building after police and media personnel had arrived at the scene. 130 people were killed in the two bombings, with at least 270 more injured. At least three more died at hospitals after the bombings, bringing the total death toll to 110. By mid-day on 11 January, the death toll had risen to 112, and by the end of 13 January it had reached 126. In addition to those at the hall at the time of the first bombing, nine policemen, 25 rescue workers and three journalists who had arrived at the scene were killed in the second blast. According to local bomb disposal officials, the suicide bomb had up to 7 kilograms (15 lb) of explosives, while the car bomb had about 100 kilograms (220 lb). The hall was completely destroyed, and surrounding buildings were damaged in the blasts, which also destroyed power lines, causing blackouts in the surrounding area.

Lashkar-e-Jhangvi, a Sunni Deobandi militant group, claimed responsibility for this attack. A government official said that the bombings were likely Lashkar-e-Jhangvi's retaliation for the shooting of a Sunni cleric and the capture of weapons from a site believed to be controlled by the group, both of which had occurred the day before. The Balochistan provincial government said that it would pay two million rupees to the family of each policeman killed, while families of the others killed would receive one million rupees. Three days of mourning were announced for Balochistan in response to the bombings.

==== Journalists killed in the attack ====
The bombing was responsible for the first deaths of journalists in Pakistan in 2013. Pakistan has ranked among the deadliest of countries for journalists over the past several years, according to the Committee to Protect Journalists. Three journalists were killed and at least two other journalists were seriously injured by the second blast in Quetta. Two were from SAMAA TV: Imran Sheikh had been a camera operator for five years and the third camera operator for the channel who was killed while covering a bombing incident; and Saifur Rehman was a reporter. Also killed in the attack was Iqbal Hussain, who was a journalist from the news agency News Network International. Rehman died later at a hospital from his injuries, while the other two died on site. At least two other journalists suffered from more than minor injuries, including Jameel Ahmed, the engineer for Samaa TV, and Mohammad Hasan, a photojournalist for Independent News Pakistan.

=== Swat Valley ===
On 10 January 2013, an explosion in a Tableeghi Jamaat seminary in the Swat Valley, outside of Saidu Sharif, killed 30 people, with 70 injured. The explosion was initially reported to be the result of a gas leak in the building's basement, but police and medical officials said it had likely been a bomb—doctors said that victims had been injured by ball bearings, often used in bombs, and according to a senior doctor there was a "smell of explosives".

== Reactions ==
Protests in Quetta by the city's Shia community erupted the day after the bombings, with protesters and local Shia officials refusing to bury those killed until the Pakistani army took control of security in the city. Protests also broke out over the weekend of 12–13 January in Karachi, Lahore, Peshawar, Islamabad and ten other smaller cities around the country.

On 13 January, Prime Minister Raja Pervez Ashraf visited protesters in Quetta and agreed to dismiss provincial government officials, though he refused to implement military control in the city. Early on 14 January, he announced that Balochistan Chief Minister Aslam Raisani and his cabinet had been removed from their posts, with Zulfikar Ali Magsi appointed to lead the provincial government. In response, Quetta Shias agreed to end their protests and begin burials later in the day.

== See also ==
- February 2013 Quetta bombing
- Quetta attacks
