= Battles of Uruzgan (1892–1893) =

1893 battle in Afghanistan

- Part of The Hazara uprisings
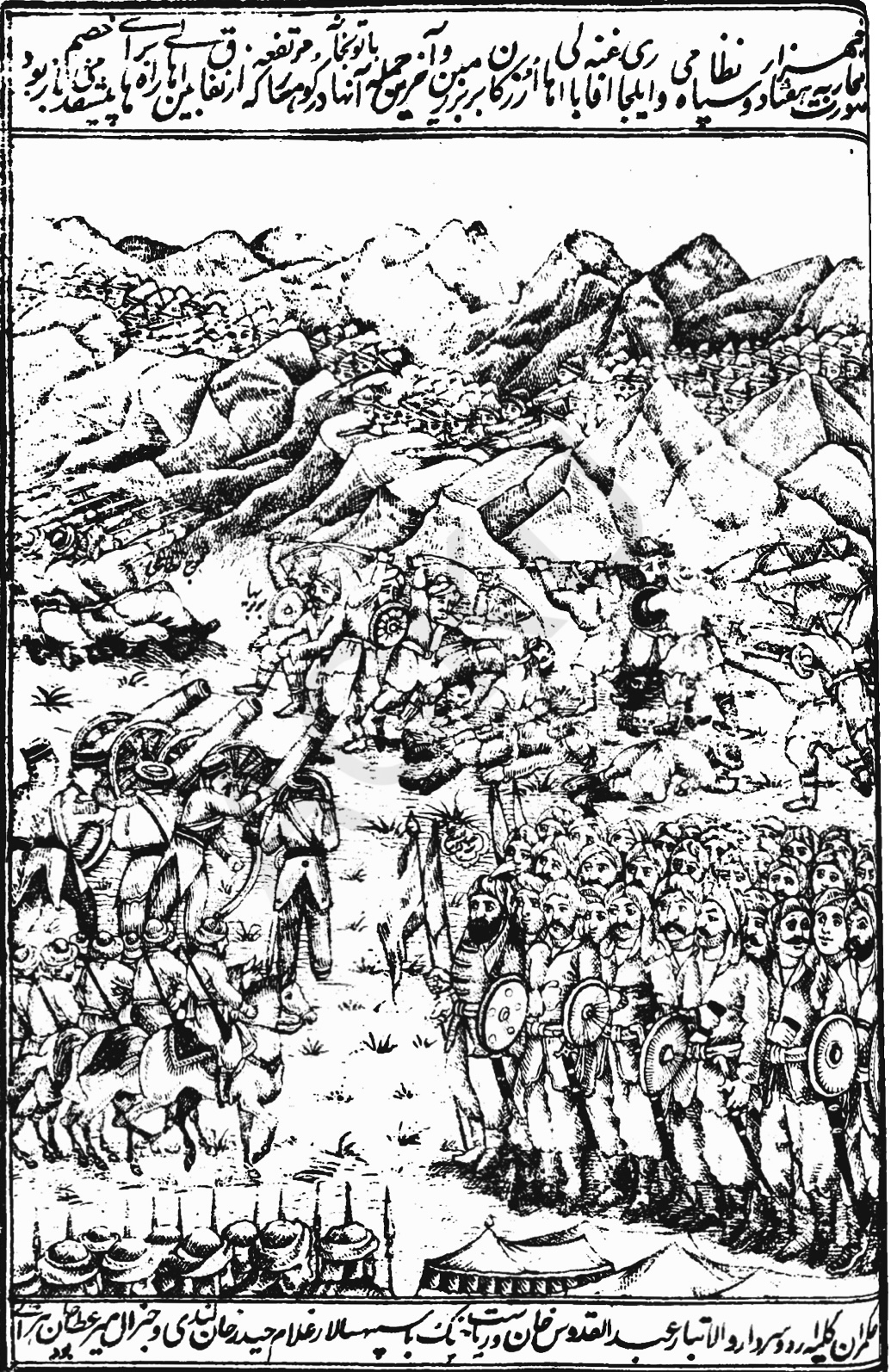
- The final clash in Uruzgan (1892), by Muhammad Yusuf Riyazi Herawi. The Hazaras, referred to as “Barbari” in the illustration, are shown fighting with swords and arrows.
Date	1892–1893
Location	Uruzgan, Afghanistan
Result	Afghan government victory
Territorial changes	Fall of Hazarajat

Belligerents
Afghanistan (Note: Aided by pro-government Hazaras, Hazara defectors, and other Sunni Hazaras.)	Hazara Confederacy; Uruzgani; Dai Zangi; Dai Kundi ...and others

Commanders and leaders
Abdur Rahman Khan; Ghulam Haidar Khan; Zabardast Khan (WIA); Sher Muhamad (WIA); Saaduddin Khan; Abdullah Khan; Mohammad Natabi; Abdul Qudus Khan; Colonel Farhad # Mir Ata Khan; Omar Khan; Nabi Khan †; Reza Beg; Sultan Ali; Mir Akbar; Mir Hasan	Mir Azim Beg (executed); Amir Beg Ilkhani; Qazi Askar Khan; Hussain Khan (POW); Mir Ghulam Hussain; Rasul Khan (POW); Taji Khan (POW); Sultan Ghulam X Arbab Mohammad X Sayyid Ali Khan †; Mir Yusuf Beg; Mir Nasir Beg; Sulaiman Beg; Ibrahim Beg; Salman Beg; Mir Baqir Beg

Strength
176,000-190,000+ (Note: 10,000+ Dai Zangi Hazaras)	35,000+

Casualties and losses
30,000+ killed	Heavy

The Battles of Uruzgan were fought in 1892-1893 between the autonomous Hazara tribes of Uruzgan and other allied rebel Hazara groups in Uruzgan , against the Emirate of Afghanistan under Emir Abdur Rahman Khan.

Uruzgan, which was considered the Hazara heartland and center of Hazarajat, was captured and its population was massacred. The battles marked the end of Hazara autonomy and the resistance against the expansion and centralization of the Afghan state.

== Background ==
The Sheikh Ali Hazaras were the first to rebel. After Sunni and Isma'ili fighting broke out in 1889–1890, governor of the area Abdullah Khan imposed a collective fine of 100,000 rupees, which only deepened resentment. In January 1890, the rebels drove offgovernment tax collectors, attacked Abdullah Khan's forces, besieged his fortress, destroyed an early relief column, and later defeated detachments sent by the governors of Khinjan and Ghorband. The rebels numbered roughly 3,000 to 4,000 armed men.

Amir Abdul Rahman Khan then sent 3,000 regular troops and 3,000 auxiliaries against them. The rebels used ambushes and seized supplies, but they were eventually overwhelmed by larger government numbers.

Their defeat was also caused by division among the Sheikh Ali clans, including the defection of the Karam Ali faction.

== War ==
In April 1892, a general Hazara uprising began in Uruzgan. The immediate cause was the alleged assault of a Hazara woman by 3 Afghan soldiers under Zabardast Khan. Members of her tribe killed the soldiers, triggering a wider revolt. The rebels attacked government fortifications, seized weapons previously confiscated from the Hazaras, and killed the garrisons. They then killed and beheaded all the Afghan soldiers and armed men stationed in the area. During the night, the rebels captured another fort in Uruzgan, reportedly killing around 100 defenders and seizing its stockpile of arms and ammunition.

The victory prompted the Fuladi, Zaoli, Sultan Ahmad, Daya, Mir Adina, and other Hazara tribes to join the uprising. Zabardast Khan's force was defeated, 300 were killed, he was wounded and lost two artillery pieces before fleeing from Uruzgan. The revolt spread rapidly across Hazarajat, and all the Afghan fawjs (regiments) of 1,000 men stationed throughout the region were destroyed one after another. The only force to survive intact was that of Muhammad Allah Khan, which retreated to Ajristan after its defeat by the Fuladi Hazaras and continued to defend itself from within a fortress. The Hazaras of Chora district also joined the uprising. Although some ordinary Hazaras had already taken part in the revolt, the Chora Hazaras formally joined the rebels after achieving several victories.

Mir Azim Khan, who opposed Amir Abdul Rahman Khan's repressive policies in Hazarajat, joined the rebellion with his forces and became one of its main leaders. He commanded Hazara forces from the Fuladi, Daya, Mir Adina, Chora, and possibly the Sultan Ahmad and Zaoli tribes, with Qazi Muhammad Askar, the chief of the Fuladi tribe. Mir Azim Beg also appealed to all Hazara Khans, Mirs throughout Hazarajat to join the rebellion, wanting to expand the uprising across the region. At the invitation of him, a general assembly (jirga) of Hazara Mirs was convened. The participants agreed to declare war against Amir Abdul Rahman and sealed their agreement by placing their signatures on the back of the Qur’an.

After the assembly ended, the Hazara Mirs and tribal leaders returned to their respective regions, and the rebellion gained renewed momentum. The Daikundi leaders Baqir Beg, Muhammad Reza Beg, and Muhammad Jan Beg joined the uprising, while the inhabitants of Kajran, Aska, Gizab, and Takhran also revolted. The leaders of Jaghori, Qalandar, Sheik, and Pashai likewise joined the rebellion. Government officials throughout Hazarajat, from governors to tax collectors, fled toward Kabul. The rebels also executed several Hazara Mirs and tribal leaders who had maintained ties or cooperated with Amir Abdul Rahman Khan.

In May 1892, the Daizangi tribe also rose in rebellion, further expanding the uprising across Hazarajat. The rebels expelled government officials from the region and captured frontier posts and fortifications along the Russian border. The Russian government instructed its officials not to intervene, stating that it was unnecessary “to interfere in the struggle of the Hazaras against the Afghan government.” As the revolt spread, many Hazara officials serving in the Amir's administration and even Hazara soldiers in the Afghan Army deserted and joined the rebellion. The Hazara revolt was very dangerous and even deadly for Amir Abdul Rahman Khan and his government.

The Amir of Kabul declared a “holy jihad” against the Hazaras, whom he branded as infidels and rebels. Those who participated in the war against the Hazaras were promised Hazara wealth and property as rewards, while Hazara women and children would be enslaved. To suppress the Hazara rebels, a very large force was assembled and prepared, consisting of approximately 40,000 infantry, 10,000 auxiliary cavalry with 100 artillery pieces, 100,000 iljari infantry, and 20,000 armed mounted men, with another 6,000 from Qataghan and Maimana.

Afghan forces stationed in Hazarajat were sent against the rebels, along with additional troops from Kabul. The Afghan forces under Abdul Quddus Khan, stationed at Kashkul, were completely annihilated by Mir Azim Khan. Seeking revenge, Abdul Quddus returned with a new force, but he was defeated again and retreated toward the Ghilji areas. The Hazaras later defeated the forces of General Sher Muhammad Khan, who had arrived from Kabul to capture the lands of the Fuladi, and Ajristan Hazaras, capturing 12 artillery pieces.

Colonel Farhad Khan entered the border of Ajristan, at Mir Adina, with artillery and regular troops under his command. The people of Malistan joined him, and 4,000 to 5,000 iljari (tribal auxiliaries) came to help him. A brief battle took place with the people of Ajristan. After six people of Ajristan, who belonged to the Daya tribe, were killed, and three others were killed on the Afghan side, the people of Ajristan surrendered at the advice of the people of Malistan.

At the same time, Commander Samad Khan arrived at Kunj-Talah with 5,000 mounted iljari, consisting of Hazara and Afghan auxiliaries, the regiment of Ghazni, 400 cavalrymen, and four cannons. The people of Uruzgan and Zaoli blocked their way, and fighting broke out. Despite the military forces sent from Kabul, the commander could not achieve any progress, as the rebellious Hazaras showed great resistance.

The Afghan commanders, Muhammad Yusuf Khan, ‘Azm al-Din Khan, and Amir Muhammad Khan, stationed in Tamazan with large numbers of cavalry and infantry, marched toward Gizab after receiving a letter from Sardar ‘Abdul Quddus Khan. At Kashkul Pass, where the Hazaras had fortified their position and prepared for battle, the two sides clashed. Unable to force the pass, the Afghan forces withdrew to Tamazan. At Ashtarlay, the Hazaras again blocked their advance, forcing them to camp there in a vulnerable position.

The first attacks against the Daizangi Hazaras were carried out by regular Afghan troops and auxiliary forces from Herat. Divisions among the Daizangi Mirs, caused by bribery and promises of rewards, weakened their resistance and allowed the Afghan forces to make early progress. However, in some areas the government troops faced strong resistance, suffered heavy losses, and were forced to slow their advance. The Daizangi territory was soon occupied, and to secure control of the area, the families of Daizangi chiefs and mirs were relocated to other parts of Herat as hostages. Some Daizangi and other Hazara leaders also turned against the rebels in exchange for official titles or wealth and workerd with the authorities suppress the uprising.

Following these victories, Afghan forces launched a general offensive in June 1892. A bloody and unprecedented war broke out between the Hazaras and government troops. Contemporary accounts consistently describe the strong resistance and determination shown by the Hazara rebels during the fighting. At the valley of Kashkul near Gizab, a major battle took place between the Afghan forces and Hazara rebels. Muhammad Azim Khan positioned his forces at the entrance of the pass, preventing Sardar Abdul Quddus Khan's army from advancing toward Chora. When Abdul Quddus Khan reached the pass from Gizab, he found it controlled by the Hazaras, leading to a bloody battle in which a large number of Afghan soldiers were killed. The Afghan losses were so great that it had caused terror among the remaining troops, but the Hazaras were eventually pushed back. Abdul Quddus Khan then captured Chora and encamped there.

Faiz Muhammad Katib, however, gives a markedly different account, portraying the battle as a clear Hazara victory. He states that Sardar Muhammad Azim Khan had fortified Kotal-e Kashkul with a great multitude of rebellious Hazaras and blocked the advance of Sardar Abdul Quddus Khan's forces. A fierce battle ensued, during which some government troops were killed and wounded. According to Katib, Muhammad Azim Khan then routed Abdul Quddus Khan's forces and threw them into disarray, capturing some government loyalists and numerous horses and weapons, he emerged victorious.

Whatever the case, Sardar Abdul Quddus managed to reach Chora, where he brought the local inhabitants under his authority without a fight and forcibly seized one of their fortresses.

Another engagement at the same location was recorded by Temirkhanov, who provides a different account of the fighting:

“A fierce battle broke out between the two sides in the Kashkul Valley (near Gizab). Several regiments and dozens of companies, numbering 20,000 armed government troops under the command of Sardar Abdul Quddus Khan, succeeded in crushing the fierce resistance of the Hazara rebels and capturing Gizab. The captured Emirs were beheaded, and all of the severed heads were taken to Kandahar. Some time later, minarets were constructed from those heads.”

San Antonio Daily Light

June 29, 1892.

The San Antonio Daily Light reported that 15,000 Afghan soldiers were killed in the fighting against the Hazaras and that the Amir was ready for an amicable arrangement.

During this period, the Uzbeks of Maimana under Muhammad Sharif Khan came to support the Hazara rebels. Around 3,000 armed Uzbeks defeated the forces of Kamran Khan Ishaqzai and later defeated the forces of Muhammad Amir Khan, the governor of Zab. But they were eventually besieged by the government forces, cutting the connection between Maimana and Herat. Several intense battles followed. Muhammad Sharif Khan won two of these engagements, but government forces eventually defeated his army. After defeating Muhammad Sharif Khan, Afghan troops moved against the Firozkohi forces and armed groups in the Zulitar area, later attacking Sar-e Pol, but the Firozkohi resistance was also suppressed.

With these threats removed, government forces again advanced into Hazarajat. However, they suffered several defeats, including at Bamiyan, where Muhammad Amir Beg Ilkhani defeated a government force under Firqa Mushir Muhammad Umar Khan in Yakawlang. Another defeat occurred at Lal wa Sarjangal, where Hazara forces fought government troops led by Mir Andaz Khan, Haji Muhammad Khan, and Muhammad Amir Khan. These victories were later reversed when forces under Ghulam Haidar Khan captured Deh-e Surkh fort and blocked Muhammad Amir Beg's advance toward Bamyan.

Amir ordered General Mir Ata Khan to march from Ghazni against the rebels with 8,000 regular troops, including cavalry and infantry, supported by 12 artillery pieces and several mortars. He also ordered Field Marshal Ghulam Haidar Khan Landi to advance into Hazarajat with another 8,000 regular troops. His orders were to capture Yaka Alang, defeat Amir Ilkhani, and then continue into Hazarajat. Sardar Abdul Quddus Khan sent Mir Hasan Beg, the governor of Lal, to Kabul. The Amir appointed him to assist and guide the field marshal, after which he joined the expedition.

Muhammad Beg Ilkhani meanwhile assembled 8,000 Hazara tribesmen, consisting of cavalry and infantry, at Yaka Alang and marched toward Bamiyan. As he approached the city, Sardar Muhammad Umar Khan moved against him with two infantry regiments and six artillery pieces, preparing to give battle.

At the same time, Muhammad Husayn advanced through Dara-ye Suf with government forces and artillery, reaching Yekeh Lang and then Deh-e Surkh, where Amir Khan Ilkhani was based. The Afghan forces laid siege to the fortress and persuaded Ilkhani's nephew, Muhammad Akbar Beg of Siyah Dara, to turn against him.

Amir Ilkhani soon encountered Muhammad Umar Khan in the mountains near Bamiyan. The battle took place at a narrow pass where no more than 2 Afghan soldiers could advance at a time. Ilkhani's advance party, including Ilkhani himself, consisted of only 11 men. As the fighting began, every pair of Afghan soldiers who emerged from the pass was shot down by Ilkhani and his companions, until 18 Afghans had been killed. When the Afghan troops caught sight of Amir Ilkhani's cavalry and infantry advancing after them, fear spread through their ranks. They abandoned their cannons and fled toward Bamiyan in such panic and haste that several soldiers reportedly died of exhaustion on the road. Their cannons, weapons, and part of their arsenal were captured by Ilkhani's forces.

While Afghan forces achieved victories in other parts of Hazarajat, they faced strong resistance in Uruzgan. Forces under Zabardast Khan were defeated by the Uruzgan Hazaras after a fierce battle and were placed under siege. When news of the defeat reached his brother, Faiz Muhammad Khan, he marched against the Hazaras, but his army was also defeated, with around 1,000 Afghan soldiers killed. Faiz Muhammad Khan was forced to retreat into his brother's fort. After a month-long siege, the Afghan forces inside the fort surrendered to the Hazaras. The rebels killed many of the remaining troops, and pursued the survivors as far as Tirin.

An Afghan army of around 30,000 men under Ghulam Haidar Khan, Sardar Abdul Quddus Khan, Colonel Farhad Khan, and General Ata Muhammad Khan advanced toward Daya and Fulad. The Uruzgan Hazaras, numbering around 9,000 fighters, confronted them at Daya, where around 500 Hazaras were killed or wounded and about 1,000 Afghan soldiers were reported killed. During the battle, an Afghan cavalry force moved toward Fulad and cut off communication between the Hazara forces. The Hazaras then fought another major battle at Fulad but were surrounded and forced back by the Afghan forces attacking from both sides, suffering losses of around 2,000 men.

Field Marshal Ghulam Haidar Khan sent letters urging the people of Darrah-i Shah Ali and the tribes of Sa‘id Darwish, Qadam, and Husayni to submit to the government, but they refused and prepared for war. He attacked them with a force of cavalry and infantry, inflicting heavy casualties, while many men from the Afghan army were also killed. The Hazaras eventually fled but, with their escape route blocked, took refuge in four forts. The field marshal besieged them and continued the attack until two-o’clock in the morning, many of the defenders were killed by the artillery bombardment. The remaining Hazaras then broke through the siege line, killing a number of besiegers before escaping.

Mir Ata Khan, stationed at Qal’ah-i Qazi ‘Askar with his force and artillery, marched against Mir Azim Khan, who had fortified Qal’ah-i Sheyr with a Hazara force. Both sides fought fiercely, with the Hazaras putting up strong resistance and inflicting heavy casualties on the royal army. After an hour and a half of fighting, the Afghan forces, due to their superior numbers, gradually broke the defenders’ resistance and stormed the sangar, killing a small number of Hazaras in retaliation for their slain comrades.

Sher Muhammad Khan marched with Muhammad Nabi Khan, the Hazara governor of Behsud, and a tribal force against the Hazaras besieging Colonel Muhammad Allah Khan. They attacked the besiegers, driving them from the sangar and lifting the siege, then pursued them to a fort where about 100 Hazaras took refuge. During the assault, Sher Muhammad Khan was wounded, while Muhammad Nabi Khan was mortally wounded and died. 73 regular soldiers were killed and 197 wounded. The fighting continued until the Hazaras exhausted their ammunition, afterward the Afghan troops stormed and captured the fort, killing all the Hazaras who were trapped.

Meanwhile, cholera broke out among the Hazara rebels, causing thousands to die without fighting. The outbreak weakened their unity and led to the dispersal of their community.

Mir Azim Khan engaged the main Afghan force at Gul Badam. A fierce battle followed, in which large numbers of Afghans were killed. A few days later, another battle took place at Tangi Chakhmaq, Muhammad Azim Khan fought with great bravery and succeeded in capturing a number of spoils from the battlefield. During the fighting, news arrived that Amir Beg Ilkhani had been defeated. This news spread through the Hazara ranks and caused the rebels to withdraw. As newly arrived Afghan reinforcements joined the besieging army, together with the army of the governor of Afghan Turkestan, their position was greatly strengthened.

The two armies met again at Qushnik, where the battle continued for seven hours and inflicted heavy losses on both sides. Afghan forces advanced from several directions, causing the Hazaras to become scattered and lose all knowledge of one another's situation. The main Afghan force then attacked the small group led by Muhammad Azim Khan, overwhelmed and defeated them.

That night, Muhammad Azim Khan gathered his family and, accompanied by only 11 mounted followers, set out for Herat with the intention of reaching Iran. An Afghan cavalry force pursued him, but when they caught up, he fought another fierce battle, reportedly killing 32 Afghan soldiers before continuing his escape, although two of his companions were also killed. During the retreat, the horse carrying his eight-year-old son was struck by a bullet, throwing the child to the ground, where he was killed. After driving back the pursuing cavalry, Muhammad Azim Khan found his son's body, wrapped it in his waist sash as a shroud, dug a shallow grave, buried him and continued his escape to Dawlat Yar.

At Dawlat Yar, Muhammad Khan Taymani welcomed Muhammad Azim Khan, swore on the Qur’an that he would not betray him, and offered him shelter. Trusting his oath, Muhammad Azim Khan accepted. After he and his exhausted companions fell asleep, Muhammad Khan Taymani seized their weapons, bound them, and handed them over to the authorities in Herat.

Muhammad Azim Khan was publicly insulted by Saad al-Din Khan, the deputy governor of Herat. Muhammad Azim Khan replied, “I was captured through treachery, not on the battlefield. Now my hands are bound and I am in your mercy that you insult me. While my hands were free, I never heard such words. It is more fitting to kill a defeated man than to insult him.”

Although the rebels in Uruzgan offered strong resistance and defended their positions with determination, they were unable to stop the advance of the Afghan army due to its larger numbers. The city of Uruzgan was eventually surrounded by government forces, with additional troops under Ghulam Haidar Khan, Mir Ata Khan, Sher Muhammad Khan, and Abdullah Khan joining the siege. Here the strength of the Afghan army had reached 90,000 with 40 cannons, 30,000 were regular soldiers and 60,000 were tribal auxiliaries. The defending Hazaras numbered at about 12,000 warriors including both locals and reinforcements from other Hazara tribes. Fighting continued every day, and the Hazara resistance was exceptionally fierce.

A Hazara warrior, using a rock as his defence, shot and killed 21 Afghan soldiers, While loading his rifle to fire a twenty-second shot, his position was struck by gunfire from all directions, he took six bullets and fell. When they approached to cut off his head, he suddenly got up, severely wounded two of them with a knife, and was then killed. Many Hazaras displayed similar acts of bravery throughout the battle. The invading army had suffered heavy losses, 5,000 Afghans were killed while the Hazara losses were about 3,000. Sulaiman Beg, the Mir of Daikundi, attempted to bring reinforcements to the besieged city of Uruzgan, but his efforts failed due to betrayal from members of his own group.

Despite their determined resistance, the Hazara defenders were weakened by growing divisions among their leaders. Disagreements and rivalries emerged, and there was no single commander directing the defence. Some left their positions to collect fodder for their livestock, leaving the roads and valleys leading to the city abandoned. while others were reportedly bribed and created divisions within their own tribes. Taking advantage of this disunity, Afghan forces pressed forward and attacked the Hazara stronghold at Sangdeh. After two-hours of heavy fighting, the fortress was destroyed by cannon fire, and the Hazaras were forced to withdraw into the surrounding mountains.

Following the capture of Uruzgan, reprisals against the local Hazara population began. homes were burned and their property was looted. According to contemporary accounts, killings extended beyond men, with women and children among those killed. Captured women and girls from Uruzgan were taken to Kabul, Herat, and Kandahar, where they were sold at very low prices and subjected to enslavement.

By mid-August 1892, the main Hazara rebel forces had been defeated. Despite these setbacks, armed resistance continued in several parts of Hazarajat. Leaders and fighters from the Daya and Fulad tribes withdrew into the mountains and carried on the rebellion, while the Zaoli, Sultan Ahmad, Uruzgan, Daichopan, Daikundi, Qalandar, and Zirak tribes also remained in open revolt. Government officials attributed their continued resistance to a refusal to accept Amir Abdul Rahman Khan's offers of amnesty, as many believed the promises would not be honored.

Second uprising

Renewed violence reignited the Hazara rebellion in early 1893, although its foundations had already been laid during the autumn of 1892. The uprising began among the Day Zangi, Behsud, and Daikundi Hazaras before spreading across much of Hazarajat and into neighboring regions.

In a letter addressed to Amir Abdul Rahman Khan, the rebel leaders attributed the renewed uprising to the conduct of government forces, citing excessive taxation, attacks on Hazara civilians, looting, enslavement, and the mistreatment of religious leaders. They also claimed that these abuses affected not only those who had rebelled, but also Hazara communities that had surrendered or remained loyal to the government.

The letter further states that when Abdul Rahman Khan sent military forces under the leadership of Abdul Quddus Khan to conquer the independent Hazarajat, the Hazaras of Dai Zangi, Daikundi, and Behsud, as well as the Hazaras of Ghazni, came to the aid of the government forces. All of these Hazaras tried to ensure that the independent Hazarajat would surrender to Abd al-Rahman Khan without resistance and obey his orders. According to government proclamations, and because ordinary Hazaras in the free Hazarajat region were being destroyed by their own Mirs and elders, its conquest took place without resistance.

The Mirs and elders of the Hazaras, acting on their own authority, laid down their weapons and, with their own hands, demolished their forts and military fortifications, because they believed that, according to the words of the Prophet and the commands of God, they should be subject to the king.

However, after government armed forces were stationed in the aforementioned areas and other parts of Hazarajat, oppression and injustice began there. Although government decrees had prohibited the buying and selling of Hazara youths, men, and girls, in practice Hazaras were turned into slaves and sold. Hazara women were subjected to abuse and sexual violence.

The responses to all the requests and demands of the local authorities remained firm, and the same position was conveyed to government officials who sought to quell the unrest. For example, the Hazaras gave the following reply to Governor Dad Muhammad Khan of Karo-Ayad: “We will fight to the last drop of our blood and will never surrender.”

The Hazara rebels rapidly expanded their control over much of Hazarajat through a series of successful offensives against government garrisons, capturing large quantities of arms and supplies, forcing many officials to abandon their posts and withdraw to Kabul. As the rebellion spread, the rebels seized control of the main routes leading to the capital, and constructed defensive trenches along key roads. Within a short time, the uprising had once again spread across most of Hazarajat.

The Hazara rebels first attempted to seize the government's food supplies stored in Hazarajat. They succeeded in capturing the supply depots and detained the officials responsible for them. In response, an infantry force equipped with artillery was sent from Bamyan to suppress the uprising. However, the force was stopped by around 5,000 Hazaras in a mountain valley in the Yabar area and was forced to retreat. The rebellion soon expanded as the rebels of Dāy Zangi, Behsud, and Dāykundi were joined by the Barlas people, the inhabitants of Gizab, and several tribes from Hujaristan. The people of Uruzgan also rose in revolt and attacked the Afghan detachment stationed there, reportedly killing around 1,400 soldiers.

However, other Hazara tribes and leaders were unable to join the rebellion due to several factors, including the heavy losses suffered during the 1892 uprising, their disarmament, and the presence of large, well-equipped government forces in their territories. Some groups even sided with government forces and assisted in operations against the rebels, including efforts to destroy armed rebel groups in their areas.

Amir Abdul Rahman took the necessary measures to completely and comprehensively surround the rebellious region, so as to prevent other Hazara tribes from joining the rebels.

At this point the Hazaras were prepared to attack Kabul. In response to the renewed rebellion, Amir Abdul Rahman Khan issued a proclamation entitled “A call to the Hazara people”, hoping to create divisions among the Hazara leadership and weaken the uprising. The proclamation intensified disagreements over whether the rebellion should continue. While many leaders remained committed to armed resistance, others feared that continued fighting would lead to the destruction of their tribes. Among them was Muhammad Reza Beg, who abandoned the rebellion and joined the government forces.

Taking advantage of this weakness, Abdul Rahman launched a large-scale offensive in April 1893. Military forces and auxiliary troops were once again mobilized for the campaign. Fresh troops were urgently brought from Herat and Kandahar under the command of generals and brigadiers, including Muhammad Umar Khan, Mir Ata Khan, and Muhammad Sadiq Khan. The government forces sent to suppress the rebellion numbered around 35,000 men, while an additional 10,000 armed auxiliaries were dispatched to other parts of Hazarajat that had not yet joined the uprising to support the military campaign.

The conflict continued for several months, during which the Hazaras maintained fierce resistance and inflicted heavy casualties on Abdul Rahman Khan's forces. After sustaining heavy losses, government forces gradually broke through the Hazara blockade of the roads with the help of artillery, and advanced into Hazarajat. The Hazara rebels resisted fiercely throughout the campaign, totally destroying several Afghan battalions, while others, including a battalion from Herat, suffered losses of up to 85% or approximately 8,500 of their men before the government was able to regain the initiative.

One of the fiercest battles of the campaign took place at Fawqani in the Pai-e Helmand area. The government forces under the command of Muhammad Umar Khan were repelled by the Hazaras, they suffered such heavy casualties and severe setbacks that they were unable to continue their advance. They were forced to take a defensive position and wait for the arrival of fresh reinforcements.

The Afghan commander, Amir Muhammad Khan marched from Kabul with a large force and artillery, He faced one of the bravest Hazara leaders, Sayyid Husayn Ali Khan who charged the center of the Afghan regular cavalry with only two companions, killing or wounding several cavalrymen with the blows of his sword and rifle and halting their advance. He repeated these attacks three times withdrawing after each charge. Muhammad Khan then committed 100 infantrymen and several cannons to the battle. Sayyid Ali Khan turned his attack on the infantry, fired his rifle, and galloped back toward the sangar, The Afghan cavalry, which had held back from his attacks, now opened fire and shot him dead. The Afghan artillery then killed 20 Hazaras, The Hazaras were unable to resist and scattered into the mountains.

By the summer of 1893, Abdul Rahman Khan was forced to recall his forces from Hazarajat and begin negotiations with the rebels.

Facing the difficulties caused by the prolonged war, Hazara leaders also agreed to seek a settlement. After a general meeting, representatives were chosen and sent to Kabul to negotiate directly with the Amir. To guarantee the safety of the delegation, several members of Afghan families were kept as hostages in case the Amir ended the negotiations or detained the representatives. After lengthy discussions, the government accepted the representatives’ demands and recognized certain rights of the Hazaras. In return, the Hazara leaders pledged their allegiance to Amir Abdul Rahman, bringing the final large-scale uprising to an end.

== Aftermath ==
The capture of Uruzgan was the beginning of the annexation and major redistribution of Hazara lands to state-allied Afghan tribesmen and Kochi Afghan nomads. What followed was a massive displacement and massacre of Hazaras especially in Uruzgan and Daychopan.

Tens of thousands of Hazaras fled to Qajar Iran near Mashhad where they are called Barbaris, to British India in Quetta now Modern Pakistan, and even to Central Asia.

== See also ==
- Persecution of Hazaras
