= Mir Azim Beg =

Hazara mir and leader in the uprising of 1892

Muhammad Azim Beg
- محمد عظیم بیگ
- Died: After November 1892 (Note: The last event of his life recorded in the Sirāj is his dispatch from Kandahar to Kabul in November 1892. The chronicle reports that twenty-four men whose seals were on the oath taken from him were shot at Kuh-i Quruq. In the autumn of 1893 twenty-seven captured Hazara leaders were shot on a hill west of Qal'ah-i Hashim Khan in Kabul. The chronicle does not name them. Riyazi, followed by Temirkhanov and Mousavi, states that Azim Beg was put to death in Kabul. None of them gives a date.)
- Other name: Sardar Muhammad Azim Khan (from 1887)
- Known for: Leader of the Hazara uprising of 1892 around Gizab and Hajaristan
- Title: Sardar (conferred 1887)
- Children: Muhammad Aslam Beg; other sons and daughters
- Parent: Ali Zahid (father)
- Relatives: Bunyad Beg (brother); Jamshid Khan of Jaghuri (father-in-law)
- Military career
- Allegiance: Emirate of Afghanistan (1887–1892); Hazara rebels (1892)
- Conflicts: 1888–1893 Hazara uprisings Battles of Uruzgan (1892–1893)

Muhammad Azim Beg (also spelled Mohammad Azim Beg; محمد عظیم بیگ), known after 1887 as Sardar Muhammad Azim Khan, was a Hazara mir of the Sih Pay (Sepay) branch of the Day Zangi. (Note: He is distinct from Muhammad Azim Beg Darzabi, a mangbashi who led Turkistan militia on the government side in 1892. He is also distinct from Muhammad Azim, an elder of the Muhammad Khwaja Hazaras who spent his last years in Tashkent and wrote Hazaristan, published in Russian translation in 1898. The girl he asked to marry in 1887 was the daughter of yet another Muhammad Azim Beg, son of Aqa Husayn Beg.) He submitted to Amir Abdur Rahman Khan in 1887 and received the title of sardar. Over the next four years he carried the amir's letters to the Hazara tribes that still refused to submit. In the spring of 1892 he turned against the government and became one of the leaders of the Hazara uprising around Gizab and Hajaristan.

Government troops stormed his last position, at Shayr Qal'ah, at the end of the summer. He fled west, was seized in September 1892 by Hazaras in government service and was sent as a prisoner to Herat, then to Kandahar and Kabul. The Siraj al-Tawarikh of Fayz Muhammad Katib records his removal to Kabul but not his death. The Herati chronicler Muhammad Yusuf Riyazi states that he was put to death in Kabul, as do Temirkhanov and Mousavi.

== Background and submission ==
Azim Beg was the son of Ali Zahid, a Sih Pay Hazara of Day Zangi. (Note: Riyazi calls his father Mir Ali Riza Khan.) The Sirāj places him in the Shadi Khan tribe. His family seat was at Ashkarabad. He also held lands and forts at Nalah. After the uprising the Afghan governor of Day Zangi kept his post at a place the chronicle calls Ashkarabad-i Ali Zahid.

For several years he stood outside the authority of Kabul. In 1881–82 government troops besieged Mir Yazdan Bakhsh of Behsud in his fortress. The mir escaped to the Sih Pay and took refuge with Azim Beg, a man "who had not bowed his head beneath the royal farman".

The amir wrote to him in November 1886, as to other leaders of the unsubmitted Hazaras. Azim Beg answered early in 1887 through the mirs of Day Zangi. He promised to count himself a subject once the Dayah and Fuladah submitted. In the same letter he asked for a robe of honour and the rank of sardar, presenting himself as the way into the unsubmitted country: "The gate to the conquest of the Hazarah yaghistan can be opened with just one word." Abdur Rahman's reply of 14 April 1887 made the title depend on service. It told him to settle the terms through two loyal Day Zangi mirs, Mir Yusuf Beg and Muhammad Amir Beg Ilkhani. At the same time the amir instructed the leaders of Hajaristan, among them Qazi Muhammad Askar, to follow whatever Azim Beg decided.

The two mirs came to him later that year with Ibrahim Beg of Sar-i Jangal and Jan Muhammad Khan, governor of Day Zangi. They met at the top of the Charkh Pass, where the Sih Pay district begins. There Azim Beg swore a pact of obedience on God, the Prophet, the Qur'an and the Twelve Imams. In return he wanted the diploma and title of sardar. He also asked for the hand of Shah Naz Aghah, daughter of another Muhammad Azim Beg, son of Aqa Husayn Beg. The amir granted the robe and the title. He left the marriage to the mirs on condition that the girl's family consented. Azim Beg reached Kabul late in 1887. Abdur Rahman gave him a robe of honour and the title of sardar, with the promise of a stipend for men and mounts equal to that of Sardar Anbiya Khan Taymani once the Hazarajat was settled. His salary was fixed at 1,666⅔ Kabuli rupees; Temirkhanov gives 1,660 rupees a year.

== The amir's envoy (1887–1891) ==
Sardar Muhammad Azim Khan left Kabul with eleven decrees (manshur) addressed to the tribes of the unsubmitted Hazarajat, among them the Inayat Khan, Hajji, Basi, Zawuli, Sultan Ahmad and Uruzgan. Leaders such as Qazi Muhammad Askar received them as well. Every letter fixed Nawruz 1888 as the deadline. By then the tribes were to submit, or the amir would send his regiments against them. The leaders reached in this way declared their obedience in 1888. They asked for a royal army to help them coerce those who still refused, a plan put off by the revolt of Sardar Muhammad Ishaq Khan in Turkistan. In the spring of 1889 the leaders of Hajaristan who had received his letters asked the amir for troops and artillery. On 8 May 1889 Abdur Rahman ordered the governors around the Hazarajat to prepare its conquest. The submission of the Jirghay leaders in November 1890 was also credited to the letters he had carried.

Mousavi cites Muhammad Afzal Orazgani (1913) for the claim that Azim Beg planned the invasion of Uruzgan, Chora and Ajristan. On the authority of a work published in 1980 he adds that Azim Beg was made viceroy of the Hazarajat. The Sirāj shows a man of more modest standing. In July 1890 his wife received the same royal gifts as the wives of five Day Zangi mirs, while Azim Khan himself "was still not employed in an official capacity" and was "sitting at home".

His title made him enemies among the Sih Pay. Mir Fayzak Beg Askani and Mir Muhammad Riza Beg Ilqani held him "as of no account" and envied him the rank of sardar. In November 1890 their followers detained the government quartermaster Ghulam Husayn Khan and dared Azim Khan to come and free him, which he knew he could not do. When the two mirs later asked him to join their plans, he refused and left Ashkarabad with his wives and children. He built a fort at Gurgabah near Gizab. In June 1891 Sardar Abd al-Quddus Khan sent him to Behsud with Colonels Farhad Khan and Muhammad Allah Khan to win over the Dayah and Fuladah of Hajaristan. In October 1891 he escorted to Kabul seven Uruzgan leaders arrested by Abd al-Quddus Khan, along with prisoners from Zawuli, Sultan Ahmad and Uruzgan. He drew his stipend from the treasury before rejoining the sardar's camp. Riyazi also names him among the Hazara mirs who marched with Abd al-Quddus Khan on Uruzgan in 1891.

== Uprising of 1892 ==
Riyazi blames the turn on the conduct of the Afghan troops after the occupation of Uruzgan. They insulted the faith of the Hazara subjects and laid hands on their property and their women. The Hazara leaders who had been supplying the army went home angry and joined the rebels. The people of Ajristan took Sardar Muhammad Azim Khan as their chief and prepared to defend themselves. Temirkhanov calls Azim Beg the most powerful and influential of the mirs who joined the uprising. He explains the change of side by Azim Beg's opposition to the amir's harsh rule in the Hazarajat. In his account the fighting men of the Fuladi, Dayah, Mir Adinah and Chora, perhaps with those of Sultan Ahmad and Zawuli, came under Azim Beg's command. Qazi Muhammad Askar of the Fuladi became his close associate. Mousavi credits him with calling the assembly of mirs known as the Jirga-e Au Qoal, at which the Hazara leaders declared war on the amir. Temirkhanov adds that the mirs signed or sealed their decision on the back of a Qur'an. The Sirāj does not describe a general assembly. It records an oath sworn to Azim Beg at Gizab by Muhammad Amir Beg Ilkhani and Mahdi Beg of Sar-i Jangal. It also mentions a Qur'an bearing an oath of rebellion in its margins, sealed by Hazara mirs and leaders, which was taken from him at his capture.

In April 1892 he fortified the Kashkul Pass near Gizab with a large Hazara force to bar the road to Sardar Abd al-Quddus Khan. His men let the sardar's column reach the head of the pass before falling on its advance guard. According to the Sirāj they killed and wounded a few soldiers, threw the regiments into disorder and carried off prisoners, horses and weapons. Temirkhanov writes that the force of Abd al-Quddus was destroyed outright. Mousavi says that Azim Beg defeated both Abd al-Quddus and General Sher Muhammad Khan. The amir learned of the rising around Gizab from the governor of Kandahar, whom he blamed for neglect.

In June a relief column of Hazara irregulars from Gizab and Tamazan, with regular troops, forced its way to Uruzgan. It was trapped there with the besieged garrison and surrendered with it. The column then withdrew towards Gizab and Tamazan, taking Azim Beg with it to Gizab. There he received the wives and maidservants of Abd al-Quddus Khan, girls the sardar had taken from the families of Hazara mirs. Azim Beg "protected and looked after them with all due regard and respect". The Day Zangi and Day Kundi horsemen serving the government in Gizab dispersed to their homes.

From Gizab his following grew until he could close the roads to the government regiments. In August he appeared with 4,000 Hazara horsemen at Qal'ah-i Timuran near Baghran, where the headman of the Baghran Hazaras secretly supplied him. Fearing a fight with him, 1,375 Durrani tribesmen deserted the column of Mawla Dad Khan, governor of Farah. Muhammad Sharif Khan of Maymana wrote to promise him support.

Sardar Abd Allah Khan, governor of Kandahar, reached the Kashkul Pass on 19 August 1892 and forced his way into Gizab. Azim Beg had already gone. He left behind forty-five daughters of Hazara leaders whom Abd al-Quddus Khan had seized. He fell back to Chaqmaq and from there to Shayr Qal'ah, where he built a sangar. The amir ordered his generals to deal with him once the Pashah-i and Shayr Dagh had been crushed. General Mir Ata Khan returned to his base at the fort of Qazi Askar in Hajaristan, camped at the edge of Nawah-i Chaqmaq and assaulted the sangar. The Sirāj concedes that "many of the (royal) army were killed". After an hour and a half the position fell. Twenty-eight Hazaras were killed and five men and two women taken prisoner. The troops then destroyed the forts of the district and its crops. Azim Beg escaped but could not raise another force.

Riyazi tells the end of the campaign differently. In his account Azim Khan fought a hard battle at Gul Badam against the main Afghan force coming from Kabul and Ghazni, with many dead on both sides. A few days later he met the troops again at Tangi Chakhmaq near Talah-i Shadi Khan, where he "fought like Rustam" and took booty. News of Ilkhani's defeat then made his men fall back. At Qushunak the Afghan generals advanced from several directions after seven hours of fighting. The scattered Hazara bands lost touch with each other. The main Afghan force then fell on the small group around Azim Khan and broke it. Temirkhanov follows this sequence. He adds that Azim Beg was taken in the last hours of the battle at Kushnik, a detail found in neither Riyazi nor the Sirāj. In the Sirāj the fight at Qushunak comes months before the battle of Shayr Qal'ah. Azim Beg is caught weeks after Shayr Qal'ah, far to the west. (Note: Temirkhanov dates the battles at Nawah-i Chaqmaq and Kushnik to August 1893 on one page. On the next he closes the same episode in mid-August 1892. The Sirāj places the capture of Gizab on 19 August 1892 and Azim Beg's arrest in September of that year. Riyazi narrates the whole rising under the year 1308 AH (1890–91).)

Left without a leader, the Fuladah submitted to General Shayr Muhammad Khan. They handed over twelve government servants, among them four secretaries and a physician, whom Azim Beg had captured at the Kashkul Pass and "treated with the utmost respect". Sayyid Muhammad Qasim Khan, the new governor of the Sih Pay, took most of Azim Beg's property for himself. In November the government fined the Fuladah, Zawuli, Sultan Ahmad and Sih Pay, the tribes the chronicle counts as his followers, 80,000 rupees for the army stores they had plundered.

== Capture ==
From Shayr Qal'ah Azim Beg reached the fortress of Talah. With his brother Bunyad Beg, his son, wife and daughter he went on to Tamazan, where he joined Muhammad Jan Beg and the followers of Salman Beg of Day Kundi. In September 1892 he was travelling with two sons, a brother, two retainers, five women and two infants when three Hazaras in government service detained him at Nawah-i Kashab. They were Anbiya Beg, Muhammad Sharif Beg and Muhammad Hasan Beg, the last two grandsons of Hasan Sardar of Day Kundi. Aqa Muhammad Khan Dawlatyari sent 400 riders who took the prisoners from them by force. Mawla Dad Khan and his officers then seized the captives from Aqa Muhammad Khan and sent them to Herat. (Note: Riyazi names the man who seized him at Dawlatyar as Sardar Muhammad Khan Taymani. A later passage of the Sirāj, placed among the events of April 1895, credits the arrest to Muhammad Jan Khan Dawlatyari. He is said to have sent Azim Beg to Kabul under the guard of his brother Ahmad Khan and to have received a salary of 1,150 qiran rupees a year as his reward. After his death the salary passed to his son Muhammad Azam Khan.) The Qur'an with the oath of rebellion went to Kabul with letters in which Muhammad Sharif Khan of Maymana and others had offered their support. Twenty-four of the men whose seals were on the oath were later arrested and shot in a single day at the foot of Kuh-i Quruq.

Mawla Dad Khan's men paraded the prisoners through the bazaars of Herat, seated backwards on mules, their faces smeared with mud and sheep bones and offal hung around their necks. The men were handed to the prison warden. Field Marshal Faramarz Khan took the women into his house and asked the amir to let him keep them. Abdur Rahman refused and ordered all of them sent to Kabul. Faramarz Khan sent Azim Beg on to Kandahar. From there the governor dispatched him to Kabul in November 1892 with his wife, his brother, a son, a daughter and six retainers.

Riyazi gives a fuller account of the flight, written from the Hazara side. After Qushunak Azim Khan sent at night for his family and set out for Herat and Iran with eleven riders, men and women. A cavalry regiment caught up with him. He turned and fought; Riyazi credits him with thirty-two of the pursuers killed for the loss of two companions. In the skirmish his eight-year-old son was dragged by a wounded horse and killed. Azim Khan wrapped the boy in his own sash and buried him in a grave scraped out with rifle butts. At Dawlatyar Sardar Muhammad Khan Taymani welcomed him as a kinsman and swore on the Qur'an not to betray him. That night his men bound Azim Khan and his companions in their sleep. In Herat the deputy governor, Sa'd al-Din Khan, abused him before the public court. One of his wives, who had travelled in men's clothes, had her head uncovered in public. Azim Khan replied that he had been taken by treachery, not in battle. Killing guilty men, he said, was easier to bear than insulting their women. His beard and those of his companions were plucked out before the parade through the bazaars. After some days in prison he was sent in chains by way of Kandahar to Kabul, where he was put to death.

== Family ==
His son Muhammad Aslam Beg served at court as a pishkhidmat (attendant). In August 1892 he was imprisoned with Mihr Ali Beg, son of Muhammad Amir Beg Ilkhani, "because of the misconduct of their fathers".

Azim Beg's father-in-law was Jamshid Khan of Jaghuri, son of Muhammad Baqir Sultan, who had himself worked in 1887 to bring the Hazaras of Uruzgan, Shuy and Bubash to submission. In November 1892 Jamshid Khan told the amir that a wife, a son and two daughters of Azim Beg were with him. The amir summoned all four to Kabul. One of the daughters later entered the harem of Habibullah Khan. Twelve more of his relatives, who had fled with a certain Baqir Beg, were sent to Kabul by Field Marshal Faramarz Khan at the end of the year.

In 1893 his kin were among 448 members of rebel families summoned to Kabul. They were imprisoned and most of them were put to death. The daughters of two sarhangs who were his sister's sons, Kazim Beg and Muhammad Nabi Khan, son of Muhammad Shafi Khan Malistani, were taken into the royal harem with Azim Beg's own daughter. Jamshid Khan and several other relatives of Azim Beg were sent to Kabul in 1894. In December 1895 the governor of Day Zangi sent to Kabul one of his sisters, who had stayed in hiding until then.

== Assessments ==
The Sirāj judges him harshly. Its author writes that Azim Beg lacked the tribal following and the personal power of other Hazara mirs. He calls him "a lowly person of little account" whose ambition for the title of sardar brought ruin on all the Hazaras. His punishment, the chronicle concludes, lies "in the hands of Almighty God in Eternity". Earlier the same author notes that he "forgot these favors of His Majesty". Riyazi portrays a brave leader betrayed by the men who seized him. Temirkhanov sees in him the most powerful and influential of the rebel mirs. For Mousavi he was "the principal leader of the rebellion".

== See also ==
- Battles of Uruzgan (1892–1893)
- List of Hazara leaders in the uprising of 1892–1893
- Muhammad Amir Beg Ilkhani
- Qazi Muhammad Askar

== Sources ==
- Kātib Hazārah, Fayż Muḥammad (2013a). The History of Afghanistan: Fayż Muḥammad Kātib Hazārah's Sirāj al-tawārīkh. Vol. 3, part 1 (1880–1889). Translated by McChesney, R. D.; Khorrami, M. M. Leiden: Brill. ISBN 978-90-04-23494-1.
- Kātib Hazārah, Fayż Muḥammad (2013b). The History of Afghanistan: Fayż Muḥammad Kātib Hazārah's Sirāj al-tawārīkh. Vol. 3, part 2 (1889–1893). Translated by McChesney, R. D.; Khorrami, M. M. Leiden: Brill. ISBN 978-90-04-23495-6.
- Kātib Hazārah, Fayż Muḥammad (2013c). The History of Afghanistan: Fayż Muḥammad Kātib Hazārah's Sirāj al-tawārīkh. Vol. 3, part 3 (1893–1896). Translated by McChesney, R. D.; Khorrami, M. M. Leiden: Brill. ISBN 978-90-04-23496-3.
- Mousavi, Sayed Askar (1998). The Hazaras of Afghanistan: An Historical, Cultural, Economic and Political Study. Richmond, Surrey: Curzon. ISBN 0-7007-0630-5.
- Riyazi Haravi, Muhammad Yusuf (1990). Fikrat Haravi, Muhammad Asif (ed.). ʿAyn al-waqāyiʿ: Tārīkh-i Afghānistān dar sālhā-yi 1207–1324 q. (in Persian). Tehran: Mawqufat-i Duktur Mahmud Afshar Yazdi. Page numbers are those printed in the book.
- Temirkhanov, L. (1993). Raḥīmī, ʿAzīzullāh (ed.). Tārīkh-i millī-yi Hazāra [National history of the Hazaras] (in Persian). Translated by Ṭughyān, ʿAzīz. Qom. Page numbers follow the Qom printing of 1372 SH (1993).
