= Soviet–Afghan War =

1979–1989 armed conflict in South Asia

- Part of Afghan conflict and the Cold War in Asia
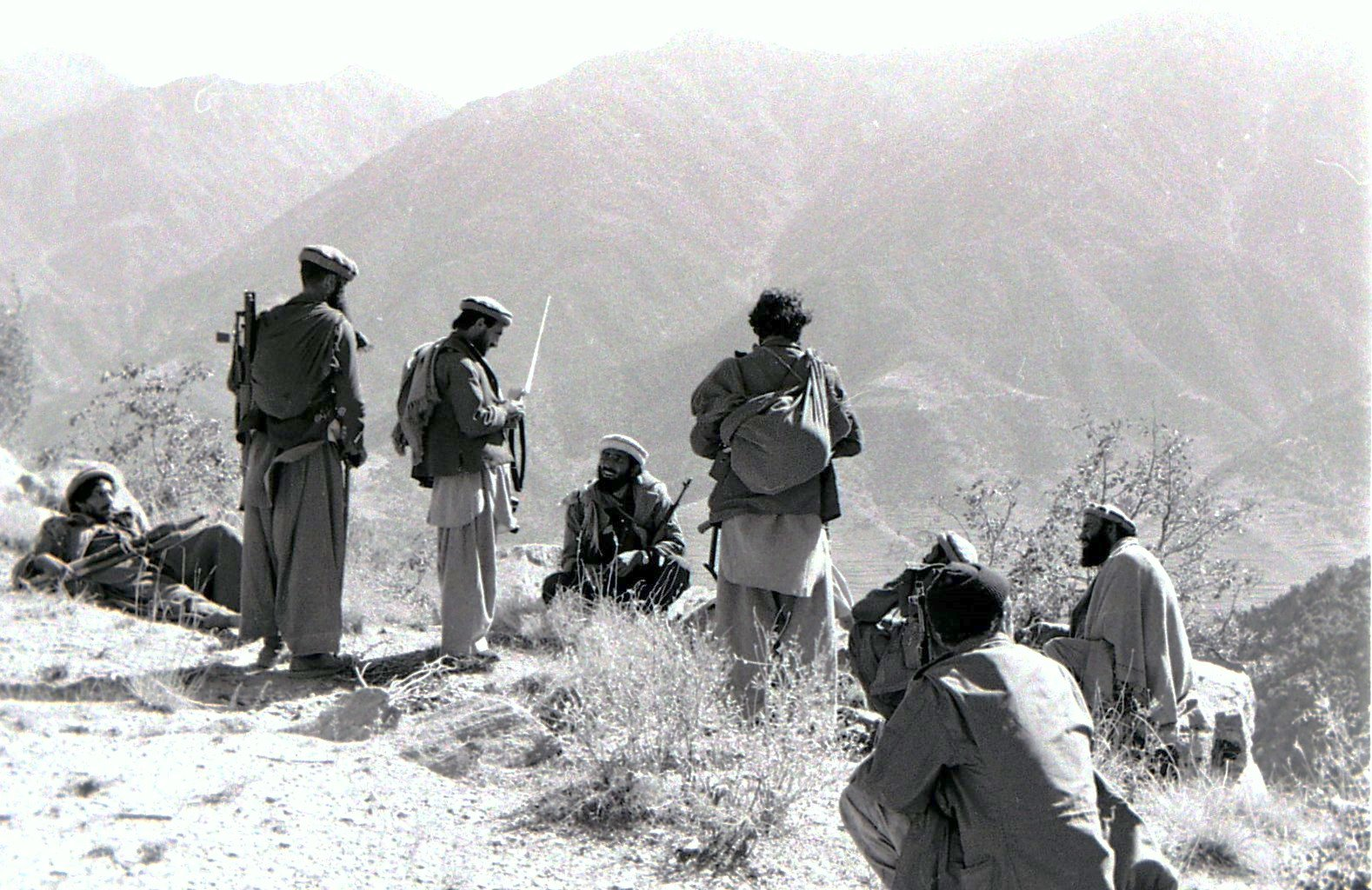
- Mujahideen fighters in Kunar Province, 1987
Date	25 December 1979 – 15 February 1989 (9 years, 1 month and 3 weeks)
Location	Afghanistan (spillover in Pakistan)
Result	Afghan mujahideen victory

Belligerents
Soviet Union; Democratic Republic of Afghanistan	Afghan mujahideen (Note: see Afghanistan–Pakistan border skirmishes for the Pakistani involvement in the border war)

Commanders and leaders
Soviet Union: Leonid Brezhnev #; Yuri Andropov #; Konstantin Chernenko #; Mikhail Gorbachev; DR Afghanistan: Hafizullah Amin X; Babrak Karmal; Mohammad Najibullah	Sunni Mujahideen: Ahmad Shah Massoud; Burhanuddin Rabbani; Gulbadin Hekmatyar; Shia Mujahideen: Muhammad Asif Muhsini; Other: Faiz Ahmad; Mulavi Dawood; Abdul Karim Brahui

Units involved
Soviet Armed Forces; OKSVA; Spetsnaz; VDV; KGB; Afghan Armed Forces; Afghan Army; Afghan Commando Forces; KhAD; Afghan Air Force; Paramilitaries: Sarandoy; Defense of the Revolution; Fidayan-i Islam; Pader Watan	Sunni Mujahideen factions: Jamiat-i Islami Afghanistan (Shura-e Nazar); Hizb-i Islami Afghanistan; Maktab al-Khidamat; Hizb-i Islami Khalis; Ittehad-e Islami; Harakat-i Inqilab-i Islami; Jebh-e Nejat-e Melli; Mahaz-e Milli; Haqqani Network; Some Ahmadzai tribes; Shia Mujahideen factions: Sazman i Nasr; Hezbollah Afghanistan; Harakat i-Islami; Shura Council; Corps of Islamic Revolution Guardians of Afghanistan; IRM; UIF; Raʽad Party; Maoist and other factions: ALO; SAMA; AMFF; Sharafat Kuh Front; Harakat-e-Mulavi; Nimruz Front; Settam-e-Melli; Afghan Mellat Party; Pakistani military units: ISI; SSG; Pakistan Air Force; NLI; XI Corps

Strength
Soviet Union: 620,000 total personnel 115,000 (1986 estimate); 120,000 (1987 estimate); DR Afghanistan: 250,000 total personnel (1989, including Sarandoy and Khad)	Mujahideen: 200,000–250,000 fighters

Casualties and losses
Total: 658,402–669,949 Soviet Union: 14,453–26,000; 9,511 killed in combat; 2,386 died from wounds; 2,556 died from disease and accidents; 53,753 wounded; 264 missing; 415,932 hospitalized due to disease; 451 aircraft lost (including 333 helicopters); 147 tanks lost; 1,314 IFVs/APCs lost; 433 artillery guns and mortars lost; 11,369 cargo and fuel tanker trucks lost; DR Afghanistan: 58,000+ killed (1980–1989); 116,000+ wounded (1980–1989); Total killed: 72,453–73,052+	Total: 162,579–192,579+ Mujahideen: 150,000–180,000 casualties (tentative estimate); 75,000–90,000 killed; Pakistan: 5,775 killed; 6,804 wounded; 1 F-16 fighter aircraft lost (lost to friendly fire, according to Pakistan) (shot down, according to Afghan authorities); Iran: 2 Super cobras shot down; Total killed: 80,775–95,775+
- Civilian casualties (Afghan): 1) 562,000; 2) 1,000,000 dead 3) 1,500,000 dead 4) 2,000,000 dead Total deaths: Approximately 1–3 million killed 3,000,000 wounded 5,000,000 externally displaced 2,000,000 internally displaced

The Soviet–Afghan War took place in Afghanistan from December 1979 to February 1989. Marking the beginning of the ongoing Afghan conflict, it saw the Soviet Union and the Afghan Armed Forces fight against the rebelling Afghan mujahideen. While backed by various countries and organizations, the majority of the mujahideen's external support came from Pakistan, the United States (as part of Operation Cyclone), the United Kingdom, China, Iran, and the Arab states of the Persian Gulf, in addition to a large influx of foreign fighters who came to be known as the Afghan Arabs. American and British involvement in support of the mujahideen re-escalated the Cold War by bringing an end to the brief détente period.

Combat primarily occurred in the Afghan countryside as most of the large cities remained under Soviet military control for the duration of the war, which resulted in the deaths of between one and three million Afghans, while millions more fled from the country as refugees; most externally displaced Afghans sought refuge in Pakistan and in Iran. Between 6.5 and 11.5% of Afghanistan's population of 13.5 million people (per the 1979 census) is estimated to have been killed over the course of the decade. The Soviet–Afghan War has been cited by scholars as a significant factor that contributed to the dissolution of the Soviet Union by 1991; it is for this reason that it is sometimes referred to as "the Soviet Union's Vietnam".

A violent uprising broke out in Herat in March 1979, in which a number of Soviet military advisers were executed. The ruling People's Democratic Party of Afghanistan (PDPA), having determined that it could not subdue the uprising by itself, requested urgent Soviet military assistance; in 1979, over 20 requests were sent. Soviet premier Alexei Kosygin, declining to send troops, advised in one call to Afghan prime minister Nur Muhammad Taraki to use local industrial workers in the province. This was apparently on the belief that these workers would be supporters of the Afghan government. This was discussed further in the Soviet Union with a wide range of views, mainly split between those who wanted to ensure that Afghanistan remained a socialist state and those who were concerned that the unrest would escalate. Eventually, a compromise was reached to send military aid, but not troops.

The conflict began when the Soviet military, under Leonid Brezhnev, entered Afghanistan to support the federal government that had been installed during Operation Storm-333. (Note: The Soviet military deployment had been variously described as an "invasion" (by the Western world and the Afghan rebels) or as an "intervention" (by the Eastern Bloc and the Afghan government). It was described as a hostile invasion by Amnesty International.) Debate over their presence in the country soon ensued in international channels, with the Muslim world and the Western Bloc classifying it as an invasion, while the Eastern Bloc asserted that it was a legal intervention. Nevertheless, numerous sanctions and embargoes were imposed on the Soviet Union by the international community shortly after the beginning of the conflict. Soviet troops occupied Afghanistan's major cities and all main arteries of communication, whereas the mujahideen waged guerrilla warfare in small groups across the 80% of the country that was not subject to uncontested Soviet control—almost exclusively comprising the rugged, mountainous terrain of the countryside. In addition to laying millions of landmines across Afghanistan, the Soviets used their aerial power to deal harshly with both Afghan resistance and civilians, levelling villages to deny safe haven to the mujahideen, destroying vital irrigation ditches and other infrastructure through scorched earth tactics.

The Soviet government had initially planned to secure Afghanistan's towns and road networks quickly, stabilize the PDPA, and withdraw all of its military forces within a year. However, the military met fierce resistance from Afghan guerrillas and experienced operational difficulties on the rugged mountainous terrain. By the mid-1980s, the Soviet military presence in Afghanistan had increased to approximately 115,000 troops and fighting across the country intensified. The war gradually inflicted a high cost on the Soviet Union as military, economic, and political resources became increasingly exhausted. By mid-1987, the reformist Soviet leader, Mikhail Gorbachev, announced the Soviet military would begin a complete withdrawal from Afghanistan. On 15 February 1989, the last Soviet military column occupying Afghanistan crossed into the Uzbek SSR. With continued external Soviet backing, the PDPA government continued the war alone, and the conflict evolved into the first Afghan Civil War (1989–1992). Following the dissolution of the Soviet Union in December 1991, all support to the Democratic Republic was stopped, leading to the toppling of the government by the mujahideen in 1992 and the start of a second Afghan Civil War (1992–1996).

== Naming ==
In Afghanistan, the war is usually called the Soviet war in Afghanistan (Pashto: په افغانستان کې د شوروي جنگ, romanized: Pə Afğānistān ke də Šurawi Jang; Dari: جنگ شوروی در افغانستان, romanized: Jang-i Šūrawī dar Afğānistān). In Russia and elsewhere in the former Soviet Union, it is usually called the Afghan war (Russian: Афганская война; Ukrainian: Війна в Афганістані; Belarusian: Афганская вайна; Uzbek: Afgʻon urushi); it is sometimes simply referred to as "Afgan" (Russian: Афган), with the understanding that this refers to the war (just as the Vietnam War is often called "Vietnam" or just "'Nam" in the United States). It is also known as the Afghan Jihad, especially by the non-Afghan volunteers of the Mujahideen.

== Background ==
=== Russian interest in Central Asia ===
In the 19th century, the British Empire was fearful that the Russian Empire would invade Afghanistan and use it to threaten the large British colonies in India. This regional rivalry was called the "Great Game". The Afghan–Russian border was agreed by the joint Anglo-Russian Afghan Boundary Commission of 1885–1887.

Following Amanullah Khan's ascent to the throne of Afghanistan in 1919 and the subsequent Third Anglo-Afghan War, the British conceded Afghanistan's full independence. King Amanullah afterwards wrote to Russia (now under Bolshevik control) desiring for permanent friendly relations. A treaty of friendship between Afghanistan and Russia was finalized in 1921. The Soviets saw possibilities in an alliance with Afghanistan against the United Kingdom, such as using it as a base for a revolutionary advance towards British-controlled India.

==== Soviet–Afghan relations post-1920s ====
Russian economic aid to Afghanistan had begun as early as 1919, shortly after the Russian Revolution. In 1942, the USSR moved to strengthen the Afghan Armed Forces by providing small arms and aircraft and establishing training centers in Tashkent, Uzbek SSR. Soviet-Afghan military cooperation began on a regular basis in 1956, and further agreements were made in the 1970s, which saw the USSR send advisers and specialists. The Soviets also had interests in the energy resources of Afghanistan, including oil and natural gas exploration from the 1950s and 1960s. The USSR began to import Afghan gas from 1968 onwards. Between 1954 and 1977, the Soviet Union provided Afghanistan with economic aid worth of about 1 billion rubles.

=== Afghanistan–Pakistan border ===
In the 19th century, with Czarist Russian forces moving closer to the Pamir Mountains near the border with British India, civil servant Mortimer Durand was sent to outline a border, likely in order to control the Khyber Pass. The demarcation of the mountainous region resulted in an agreement, signed with the Afghan Emir, Abdur Rahman Khan, in 1893. It became known as the Durand Line.

In 1947, the Prime Minister of the Kingdom of Afghanistan, Mohammad Daoud Khan, rejected the Durand Line.

The British Raj came to an end in 1947, and the Dominion of Pakistan gained independence from British India and inherited the Durand Line as its frontier with Afghanistan.

The regime of Daoud Khan had hostile relations with both Pakistan and Iran. Like all previous Afghan rulers since 1901, Daoud Khan wanted to emulate Emir Abdur Rahman Khan and unite his divided country.

=== 1960s–1970s: Proxy war ===
The Afghanistan–Pakistan border

In 1954, the United States began selling arms to its ally Pakistan, while refusing an Afghan request to buy arms, out of fear that the Afghans would use the weapons against Pakistan. As a consequence, Afghanistan, though officially neutral in the Cold War, drew closer to India and the Soviet Union, which were willing to sell them weapons.

As a result of continued resentment against Daoud's autocratic rule, close ties with the Soviet Union and economic downturn, Daoud Khan was forced to resign by the King of Afghanistan, Mohammed Zahir Shah. Following his resignation the crisis between Pakistan and Afghanistan was resolved and Pakistan re-opened trade routes. The King installed a new prime minister and started creating a balance in Afghanistan's relation with the West and the Soviet Union, which angered the Soviet Union.

=== 1973 coup d'état ===
In 1973, Daoud Khan, supported by Soviet-trained Afghan Army officers and a large base of the Afghan Commando Forces, seized power from the King in a bloodless coup, and established the first Afghan republic. Following his return to power, Daoud revived his Pashtunistan policy and for the first time started proxy warring against Pakistan. The Pakistani government of prime minister Zulfikar Ali Bhutto was alarmed by this. The Soviet Union supported Daoud Khan's militancy against Pakistan as they wanted to weaken Pakistan, which was an ally of both the United States and China. The Soviet Union believed that the hostile behaviour of Afghanistan against Pakistan and Iran could alienate Afghanistan from the west, and Afghanistan would be forced into a closer relationship with the Soviet Union.

In response to Afghanistan's proxy war, Pakistan started supporting Afghans who were critical of Daoud Khan. Pakistan's goal was to overthrow Daoud's regime and establish an Islamist theocracy in its place.

President Daoud Khan began to realize that a friendly Pakistan was in his best interests. He agreed to stop supporting anti-Pakistan militants and to expel any remaining militants in Afghanistan. Daoud also started reducing his dependence on the Soviet Union. As a consequence Afghanistan's relations with the Soviet Union deteriorated.

=== Saur Revolution of 1978 ===
The Marxist People's Democratic Party of Afghanistan's strength grew considerably after its foundation. In 1967, the PDPA split into two rival factions, the Khalq (Masses) faction headed by Nur Muhammad Taraki and the Parcham (Flag) faction led by Babrak Karmal. The radical Khalq faction believed in rapidly transforming Afghanistan, if necessary even using violence, from a feudal system into a Communist society, while the moderate Parcham faction favored a more gradualist and gentler approach.

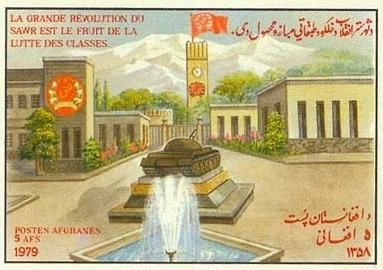
Postage stamp from 1979 depicting the Arg, with the text reading "The Great Saur Revolution is the fruit of the class struggle"

Intense opposition from factions of the PDPA was sparked by the repression imposed on them by Daoud's regime and the death of a leading PDPA member, Mir Akbar Khyber. The mysterious circumstances of Khyber's death sparked massive anti-Daoud demonstrations in Kabul, which resulted in the arrest of several prominent PDPA leaders. On 27 April 1978, the Afghan Army, which had been sympathetic to the PDPA cause, overthrew and executed Daoud along with members of his family. After this the Democratic Republic of Afghanistan (DRA) was formed. On 5 December 1978, a treaty of friendship was signed between the Soviet Union and Afghanistan.

==== "Red Terror" of the revolutionary government ====
We only need one million people to make the revolution. It doesn't matter what happens to the rest. We need the land, not the people.

— Announcement from Khalqist radio-broadcast after the 1978 April coup in Afghanistan

After the revolution, Nur Muhammad Taraki assumed the leadership, prime ministership and general secretaryship of the PDPA. The government was divided along factional lines, with Taraki and Deputy Prime Minister Hafizullah Amin of the Khalq faction pitted against Parcham leaders such as Babrak Karmal. Immediately after coming to power, the Khalqis began to persecute the Parchamis. Within the PDPA, conflicts resulted in exiles, purges and executions of Parcham members. The Khalq state executed between 10,000 and 27,000 people, mostly at Pul-e-Charkhi prison, prior to the Soviet intervention. Political scientist Olivier Roy estimated between 50,000 and 100,000 people disappeared during the Taraki–Amin period:

There is only one leading force in the country – Hafizullah Amin. In the Politburo, everybody fears Amin.

— PDPA Politburo member Nur Ahmad Nur to Soviet Ambassador Alexander Puzanov, June 1978

During its first 18 months of rule, the PDPA applied a Soviet-style program of modernizing reforms, many of which were viewed by conservatives as opposing Islam. By mid-1978, a rebellion started. In September 1979, Hafizullah Amin seized power, arresting and killing Taraki. More than two months of instability overwhelmed Amin's regime as he moved against his opponents in the PDPA and the growing rebellion.

==== Affairs with the USSR after the revolution ====
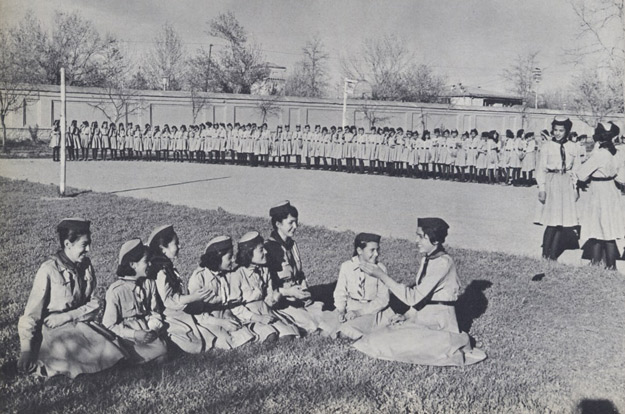
Afghanistan Scout Association in the 1950s

We believe it would be a fatal mistake to commit ground troops. [...] If our troops went in, the situation in your country would not improve. On the contrary, it would get worse. Our troops would have to struggle not only with an external aggressor, but with a significant part of your own people. And the people would never forgive such things.

— Alexei Kosygin, the Chairman of the USSR Council of Ministers, in response to Taraki's request for Soviet presence in Afghanistan

Following the Herat uprising, the first major sign of anti-regime resistance, Taraki contacted Alexei Kosygin, chairman of the USSR Council of Ministers, and asked for "practical and technical assistance with men and armament". Kosygin rejected attempts by Taraki to solicit Soviet military aid in Afghanistan. Following Kosygin's rejection, Taraki requested aid from Leonid Brezhnev, who warned Taraki that full Soviet intervention "would only play into the hands of our enemies – both yours and ours".

=== Initiation of the rebellion ===
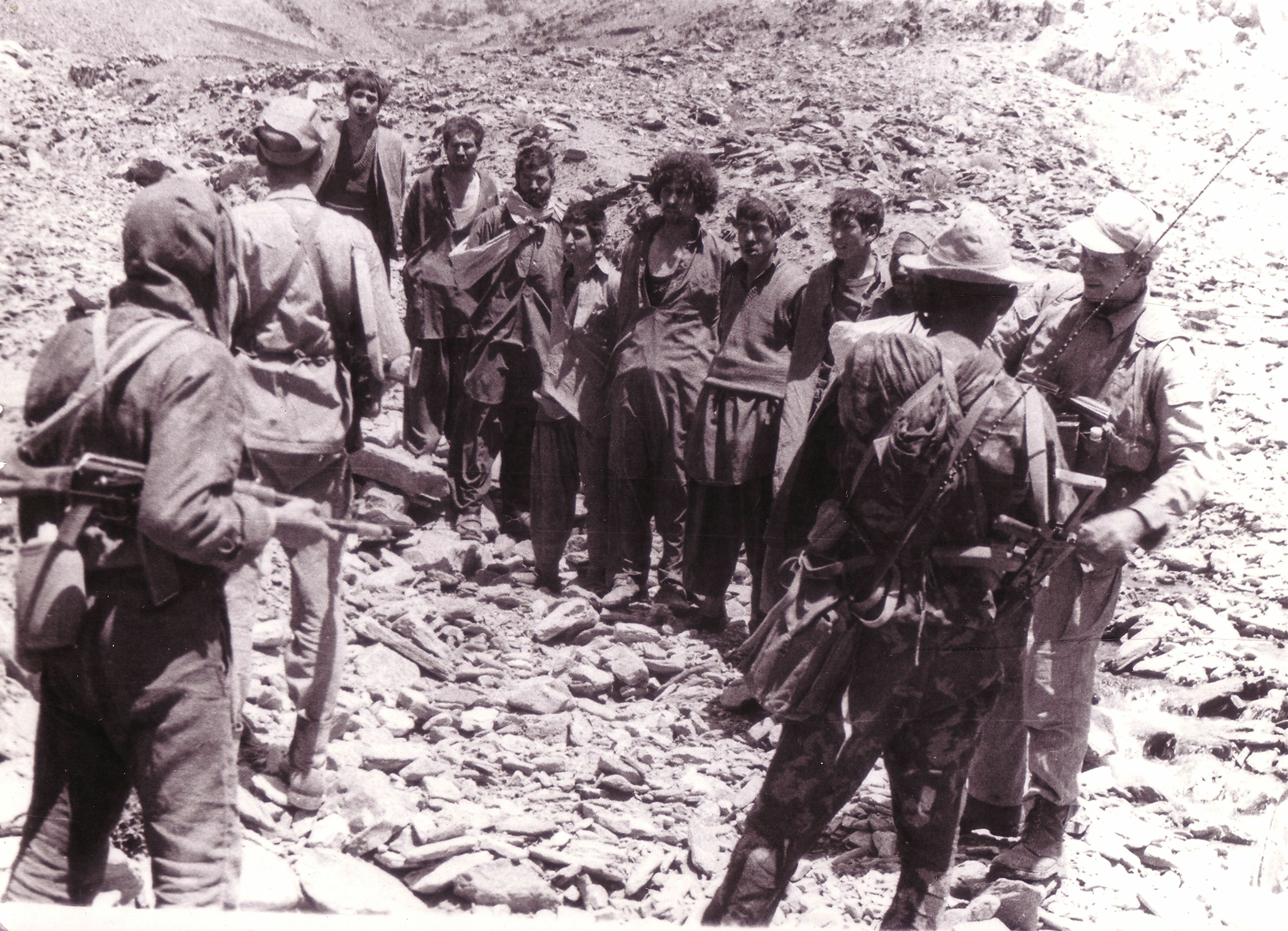
Soviet forces after capturing some Mujahideen

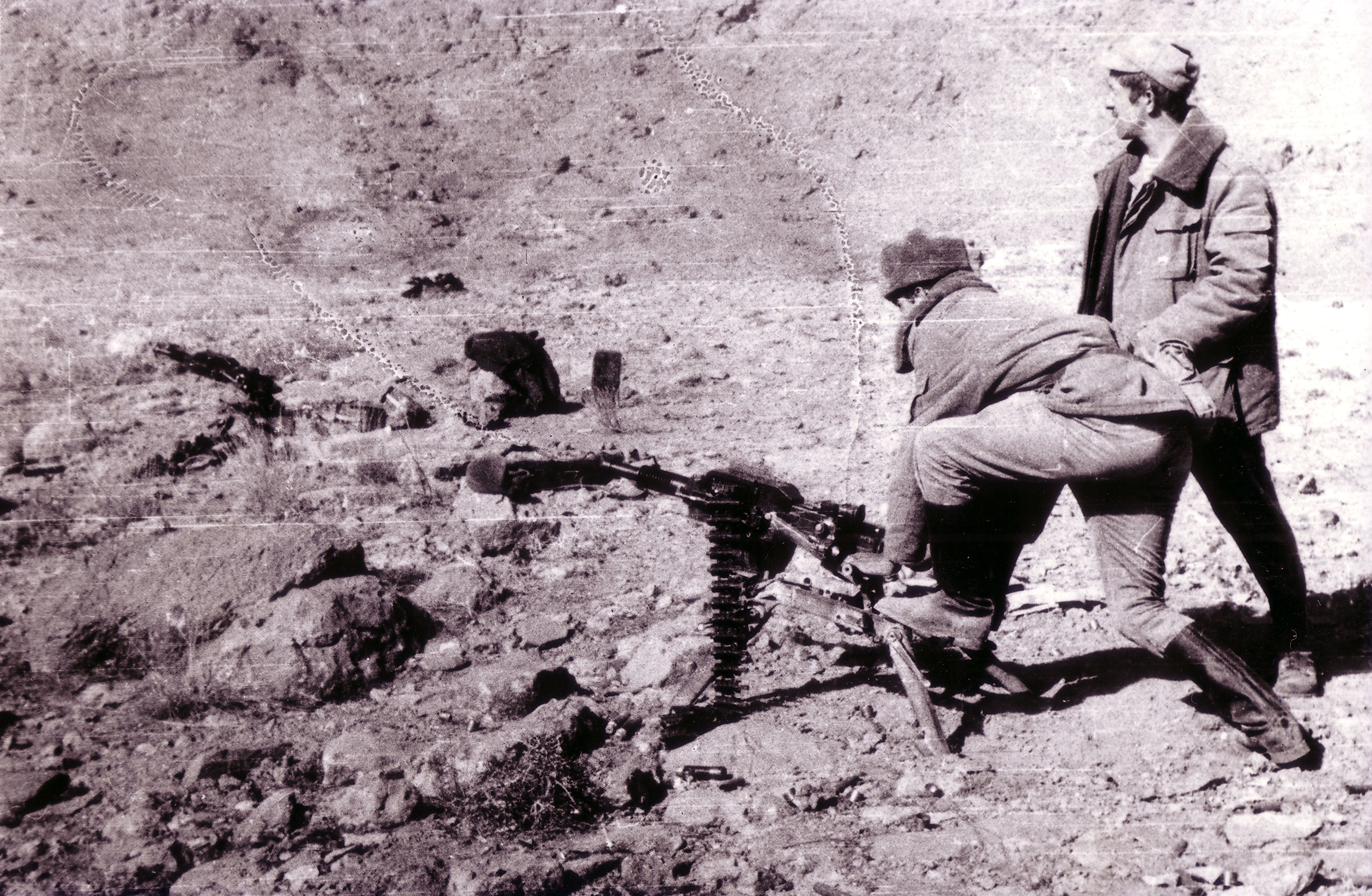
Soviet soldiers conducting training

The government brooked no opposition, responding with violence to unrest. Between April 1978 and the Soviet Intervention of December 1979, thousands of prisoners, perhaps as many as 27,000, were executed.

Large parts of the country went into open rebellion. By the spring of 1979, 24 of the 28 provinces had suffered outbreaks of violence. The rebellion began to take hold in the cities: in March 1979 in Herat, rebels led by Ismail Khan revolted. Between 3,000 and 5,000 people were killed and wounded during the Herat revolt. Some 100 Soviet citizens and their families were killed. By August 1979, up to 165,000 Afghans had fled across the border to Pakistan. The main reason the revolt spread so widely was the disintegration of the Afghan army in a series of insurrections. The numbers of the Afghan army fell from 110,000 men in 1978 to 25,000 by 1980. The U.S. embassy in Kabul cabled to Washington the army was melting away "like an ice floe in a tropical sea".

==== Pakistan–U.S. relations and rebel aid ====
Pakistani intelligence officials began privately lobbying the U.S. and its allies to send materiel assistance to the Islamist rebels. In March 1979, the "CIA sent several covert action options relating to Afghanistan to the SCC [Special Coordination Committee]" of the United States National Security Council. At a 30 March meeting, U.S. Department of Defense representative Walter B. Slocombe "asked if there was value in keeping the Afghan insurgency going, 'sucking the Soviets into a Vietnamese quagmire?'"

President Carter signed two presidential findings in July 1979 permitting the CIA to spend $695,000 on non-military assistance (e.g., "cash, medical equipment, and radio transmitters") and on a propaganda campaign targeting the Soviet-backed leadership of the DRA, which (in the words of Steve Coll) "seemed at the time a small beginning."

== Soviet deployment, 1979 ==
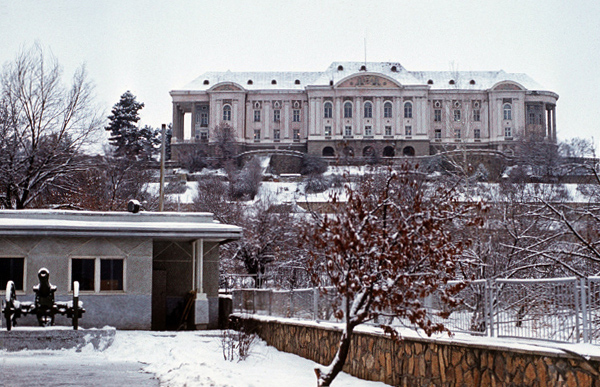
The headquarters of the Soviet 40th Army in Tajbeg Palace, Kabul, 1987. Before the Soviet intervention, the building was the presidential palace, where Hafizullah Amin was assassinated.

The Amin government, having secured a treaty in December 1978 that allowed them to call on Soviet forces, repeatedly requested the introduction of troops in Afghanistan in the spring and summer of 1979. They requested Soviet troops to provide security and to assist in the fight against the mujahideen ("Those engaged in jihad") rebels. After the killing of Soviet technicians in Herat by rioting mobs, the Soviet government sold several Mi-24 helicopters to the Afghan military. On 14 April 1979, the Afghan government requested that the USSR send 15 to 20 helicopters with their crews to Afghanistan, and on 16 June, the Soviet government responded and sent a detachment of tanks, BMPs, and crews to guard the government in Kabul and to secure the Bagram and Shindand air bases. In response to this request, an airborne battalion, commanded by Lieutenant Colonel A. Lomakin, arrived at Bagram on 7 July. They arrived without their combat gear, disguised as technical specialists. They were the personal bodyguards for General Secretary Taraki. The paratroopers were directly subordinate to the senior Soviet military advisor and did not interfere in Afghan politics. Several leading politicians at the time such as Alexei Kosygin and Andrei Gromyko were against intervention.

After a month, the Afghan requests were no longer for individual crews and subunits, but for regiments and larger units. In July, the Afghan government requested that two motorized rifle divisions be sent to Afghanistan. The following day, they requested an airborne division in addition to the earlier requests. They repeated these requests and variants to these requests over the following months right up to December 1979. However, the Soviet government was in no hurry to grant them.

We should tell Taraki and Amin to change their tactics. They still continue to execute those people who disagree with them. They are killing nearly all of the Parcham leaders, not only the highest rank, but of the middle rank, too.

— Kosygin speaking at a Politburo session.

Based on information from the KGB, Soviet leaders felt that Prime Minister Hafizullah Amin's actions had destabilized the situation in Afghanistan. Following his initial coup against and killing of Taraki, the KGB station in Kabul warned Moscow that Amin's leadership would lead to "harsh repressions, and as a result, the activation and consolidation of the opposition."

The Soviets established a special commission on Afghanistan, comprising the KGB chairman Yuri Andropov, Boris Ponomarev from the Central Committee and Dmitry Ustinov, the Minister of Defence. In late April 1979, the committee reported that Amin was purging his opponents, including Soviet loyalists, that his loyalty to Moscow was in question and that he was seeking diplomatic links with Pakistan and possibly the People's Republic of China (which at the time had poor relations with the Soviet Union). Of specific concern were Amin's supposed meetings with the U.S. chargé d'affaires, J. Bruce Amstutz, which were used as a justification for the invasion by the Kremlin.

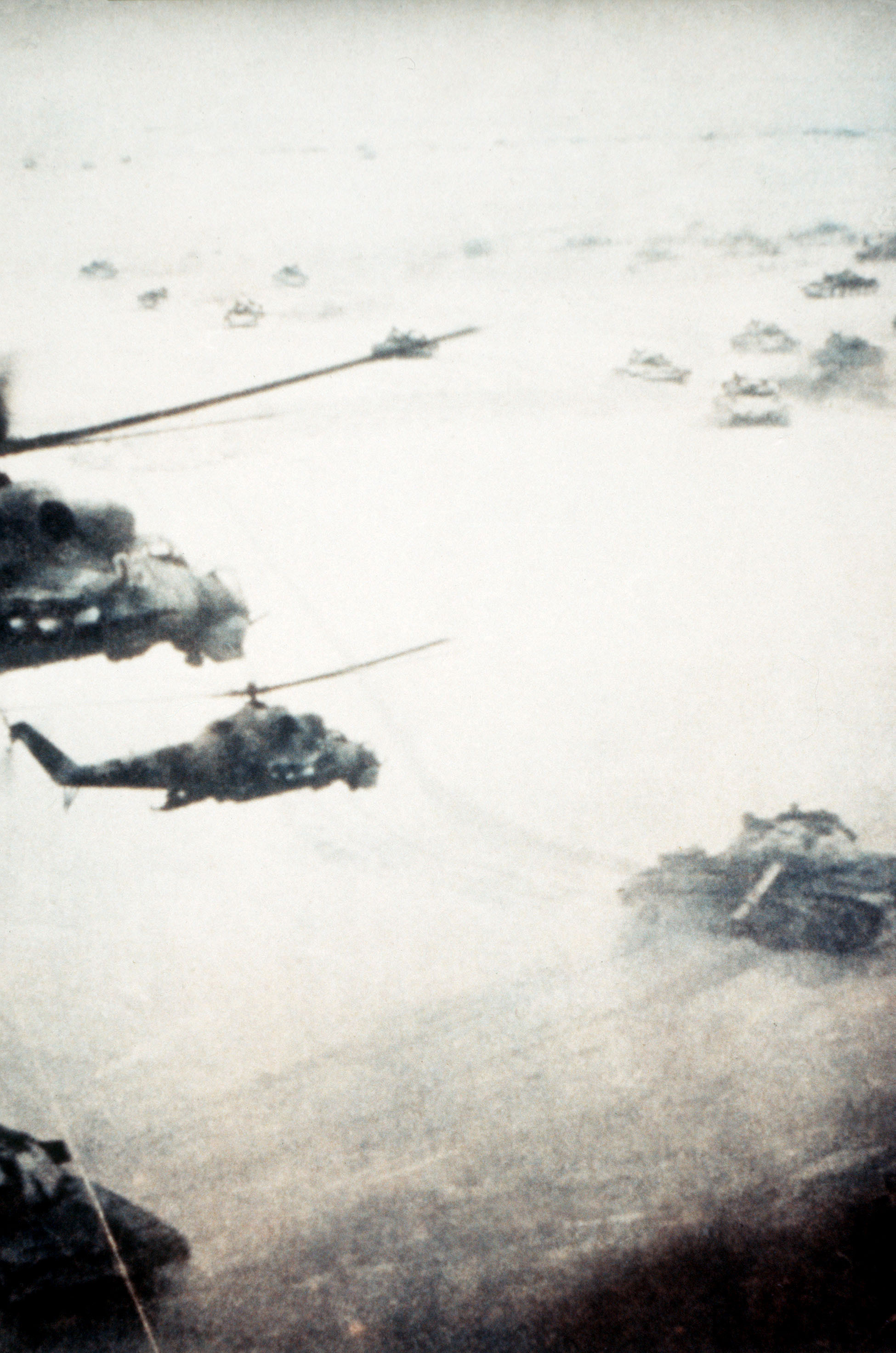
Soviet ground forces in action, supported by Mi-24 helicopters and T-62 tanks, while conducting an offensive operation against the Afghan mujahideen in 1984

Information forged by the KGB from its agents in Kabul provided the last arguments to eliminate Amin. Supposedly, two of Amin's guards killed the former General Secretary Nur Muhammad Taraki with a pillow, and Amin himself was portrayed as a CIA agent. The latter is widely discredited, with Amin repeatedly demonstrating friendliness toward the various delegates of the Soviet Union in Afghanistan and maintaining the pro-Soviet line. Soviet General Vasily Zaplatin, a political advisor of Premier Brezhnev at the time, claimed that four of General Secretary Taraki's ministers were responsible for the destabilization. However, Zaplatin failed to emphasize this in discussions and was not heard.

During meetings between General Secretary Taraki and Soviet leaders in March 1979, the Soviets promised political support and to send military equipment and technical specialists, but upon repeated requests by Taraki for direct Soviet intervention, the leadership adamantly opposed him; reasons included that they would be met with "bitter resentment" from the Afghan people, that intervening in another country's civil war would hand a propaganda victory to their opponents, and Afghanistan's overall inconsequential weight in international affairs, in essence realizing they had little to gain by taking over a country with a poor economy, unstable government, and population hostile to outsiders. However, as the situation continued to deteriorate from May–December 1979, Moscow changed its mind on dispatching Soviet troops. The reasons for this complete turnabout are not entirely clear, and several speculative arguments include: the grave internal situation and inability for the Afghan government to retain power much longer; the effects of the Iranian Revolution that brought an Islamic theocracy into power, leading to fears that religious fanaticism would spread through Afghanistan and into Soviet Muslim Central Asian republics; Taraki's murder and replacement by Amin, who the Soviet leadership believed had secret contacts within the American embassy in Kabul and "was capable of reaching an agreement with the United States"; however, allegations of Amin colluding with the Americans have been widely discredited and it was revealed in the 1990s that the KGB actually planted the story; and the deteriorating ties with the United States after NATO's two-track missile deployment decision in response to Soviet nuclear presence in Eastern Europe and the failure of Congress to ratify the SALT II treaty, creating the impression that détente was "already effectively dead."

The British journalist Patrick Brogan wrote in 1989: "The simplest explanation is probably the best. They got sucked into Afghanistan much as the United States got sucked into Vietnam, without clearly thinking through the consequences, and wildly underestimating the hostility they would arouse". By the fall of 1979, the Amin regime was collapsing with morale in the Afghan Army having fallen to rock-bottom levels, while the mujahideen had taken control of much of the countryside. The general consensus amongst Afghan experts at the time was that it was not a question of if, but when the mujahideen would take Kabul.

In October 1979, a KGB Spetsnaz force Zenith covertly dispatched a group of specialists to determine the potential reaction from local Afghans to a presence of Soviet troops there. They concluded that deploying troops would be unwise and could lead to war, but this was reportedly ignored by the KGB chairman Yuri Andropov. A Spetsnaz battalion of Central Asian troops, dressed in Afghan Army uniforms, was covertly deployed to Kabul between 9 and 12 November 1979. They moved a few days later to the Tajbeg Palace, where Amin was moving to.

In Moscow, Leonid Brezhnev was indecisive and waffled as he usually did when faced with a difficult decision. The three decision-makers in Moscow who pressed the hardest for an invasion in the fall of 1979 were the troika consisting of Foreign Minister Andrei Gromyko; the Chairman of KGB, Yuri Andropov, and the Defense Minister Marshal Dmitry Ustinov. The principal reasons for the invasion were the belief in Moscow that Amin was a leader both incompetent and fanatical who had lost control of the situation, together with the belief that it was the United States via Pakistan who was sponsoring the Islamist insurgency in Afghanistan. Andropov, Gromyko and Ustinov all argued that if a radical Islamist regime came to power in Kabul, it would attempt to sponsor radical Islam in Soviet Central Asia, thereby requiring a preemptive strike. What was envisioned in the fall of 1979 was a short intervention under which Moscow would replace radical Khalqi Communist Amin with the moderate Parchami Communist Babrak Karmal to stabilize the situation. Contrary to the contemporary view of Brzezinski and the regional powers, access to the Persian Gulf played no role in the decision to intervene on the Soviet side.

The concerns raised by the Chief of the Soviet Army General Staff, Marshal Nikolai Ogarkov who warned about the possibility of a protracted guerrilla war, were dismissed by the troika who insisted that any occupation of Afghanistan would be short and relatively painless. Most notably, though the diplomats of the Narkomindel at the Embassy in Kabul and the KGB officers stationed in Afghanistan were well informed about the developments in that country, such information rarely filtered through to the decision-makers in Moscow who viewed Afghanistan more in the context of the Cold War rather than understanding Afghanistan as a subject in its own right. The viewpoint that it was the United States that was fomenting the Islamic insurgency in Afghanistan with the aim of destabilizing Soviet-dominated Central Asia tended to downplay the effects of an unpopular Communist government pursuing policies that the majority of Afghans violently disliked as a generator of the insurgency and strengthened those who argued some sort of Soviet response was required to a supposed "outrageous American provocation." It was assumed in Moscow that because Pakistan (an ally of both the United States and China) was supporting the mujahideen that therefore it was ultimately the United States and China who were behind the rebellion in Afghanistan.

Amin's revolutionary government had lost credibility with virtually all of the Afghan population. A combination of chaotic administration, excessive brutality from the secret police, unpopular domestic reforms, and a deteriorating economy, along with public perceptions that the state was atheistic and anti-Islamic, all added to the government's unpopularity. After 20 months of Khalqist rule, the country deteriorated in almost every facet of life. The Soviet Union believed that without intervention, Amin's government would have been disintegrated by the resistance and the country would have been "lost" to a regime most likely hostile to the USSR.

== Soviet invasion and palace coup ==
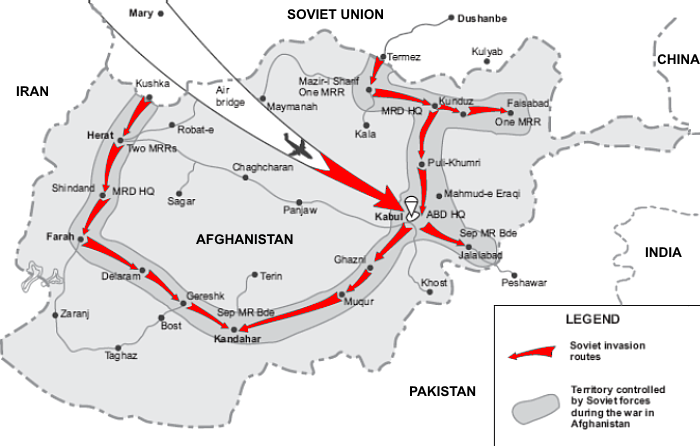
Map of the Soviet invasion, December 1979

On 31 October 1979, Soviet informants under orders from the inner circle of advisors around Soviet General Secretary Leonid Brezhnev relayed information to the Afghan Armed Forces for them to undergo maintenance cycles for their tanks and other crucial equipment. Meanwhile, telecommunications links to areas outside of Kabul were severed, isolating the capital.

The Soviet 40th Army launched its initial incursion into Afghanistan on 25 December under the pretext of extending "international aid" to its puppet Democratic Republic of Afghanistan. On 25 December, Soviet Defence Minister Dmitry Ustinov issued an official order, stating that "[t]he state frontier of the Democratic Republic of Afghanistan is to be crossed on the ground and in the air by forces of the 40th Army and the Air Force at 15:00 hrs on 25 December". This was the formal beginning of the Soviet invasion of Afghanistan. Subsequently, on 27 December, Soviet troops arrived at Kabul International Airport, causing a stir among the city's residents.

Simultaneously, Amin moved the offices of the General Secretary to the Tajbeg Palace, believing this location to be more secure from possible threats. According to Colonel General Tukharinov and Merimsky, Amin was fully informed of the military movements, having requested Soviet military assistance to northern Afghanistan on 17 December. His brother and General Dmitry Chiangov met with the commander of the 40th Army before Soviet troops entered the country, to work out initial routes and locations for Soviet troops.

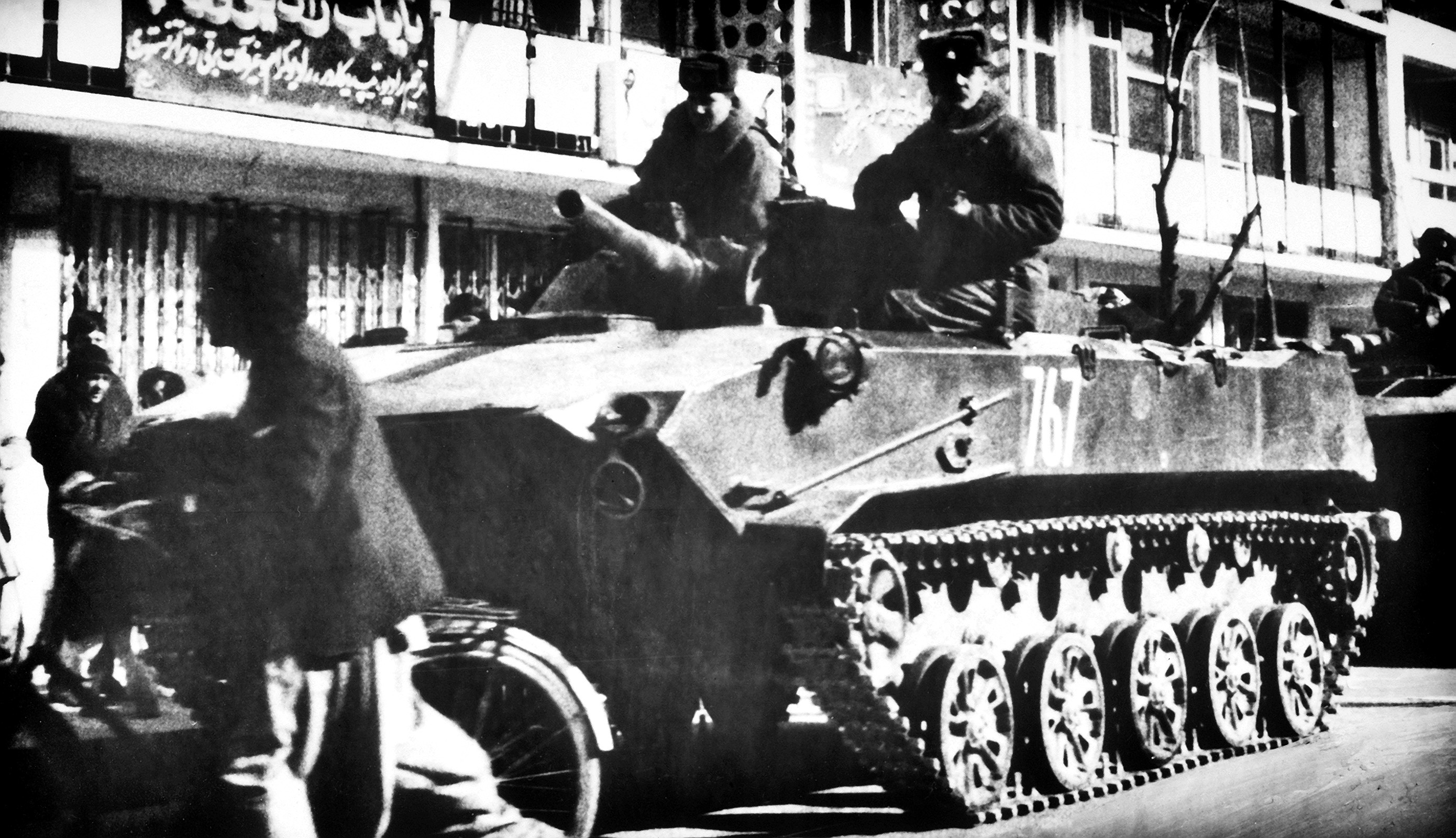
Soviet paratroopers aboard a BMD-1 in Kabul

On 27 December 1979, 700 Soviet troops dressed in Afghan uniforms, including KGB and GRU special forces officers from the Alpha Group and Zenith Group, occupied major governmental, military and media buildings in Kabul, including their primary target, the Tajbeg Palace. The operation began at 19:00, when the KGB-led Soviet Zenith Group destroyed Kabul's communications hub, paralyzing Afghan military command. At 19:15, Operation Storm-333, the assault on Tajbeg Palace began; as planned, General Secretary Hafizullah Amin was assassinated. Simultaneously, other key buildings were occupied (e.g., the Ministry of Interior Affairs at 19:15). The operation was fully complete by the morning of 28 December 1979.

The Soviet military command at Termez, Uzbek SSR, announced on Radio Kabul that Afghanistan had been "liberated" from Amin's rule. According to the Soviet Politburo, they were complying with the 1978 Treaty of Friendship, Cooperation and Good Neighborliness, and Amin had been "executed by a tribunal for his crimes" by the Afghan Revolutionary Central Committee. That committee then installed former Deputy Prime Minister Babrak Karmal as head of government.

Soviet ground forces, under the command of Marshal Sergey Sokolov, entered Afghanistan from the north on 27 December. In the morning, the 103rd Guards 'Vitebsk' Airborne Division landed at the airport at Bagram and the deployment of Soviet troops in Afghanistan was underway. The force that entered Afghanistan, in addition to the 103rd Guards Airborne Division, was under command of the 40th Army and consisted of the 108th and 5th Guards Motor Rifle Divisions, the 860th Separate Motor Rifle Regiment, the 56th Separate Airborne Assault Brigade, and the 36th Mixed Air Corps. Later on, the 201st and 68th Motor Rifle Divisions also entered the country, along with other smaller units. In all, the initial Soviet force was around 1,800 tanks, 80,000 soldiers and 2,000 AFVs. In the second week alone, Soviet aircraft had made a total of 4,000 flights into Kabul. With the arrival of the two later divisions, the total Soviet force rose to over 100,000 personnel.

As part of Baikal-79, a larger operation aimed at taking 20 key strongholds in and around Kabul, the Soviet 105th Airborne Division secured the city and disarmed Afghan Army units without facing opposition. On 1 January 1980, Soviet paratroopers ordered the 26th Airborne Regiment in Bala Hissar to disarm, only for them to refuse and fire upon the Soviets, and a firefight ensued. The Soviet paratroopers annihilated most of the regiment, with 700 Afghan paratroopers being killed or captured. In the aftermath of the battle, 26th Airborne Regiment was disbanded and later reorganized into the 37th Commando Brigade, led by Col. Shahnawaz Tanai, being the largest commando formation at a strength of three battalions. As a result of the battle with the 26th Airborne Regiment, the Soviet 357th Guards Airborne Regiment were permanently stationed in Bala Hissar fortress, meaning this new brigade was stationed at Rish Khor camp. In the same year, the 81st Artillery Brigade was given airborne training and converted into the 38th Commando Brigade, stationed in Mahtab Qala (lit. Moonlit Fortress) garrison southwest of Kabul under the command of Brig. Tawab Khan.

=== International positions on Soviet invasion ===
The Christmas-time invasion of a practically defenseless country was shocking for the international community, and caused a sense of alarm for its neighbor Pakistan. On 2 January 1980 President Carter withdrew the SALT-II treaty from consideration before the Senate, and on 3 January he recalled US Ambassador Thomas J. Watson from Moscow. On 9 January the United Nations Security Council passed Resolution 462. Following the resolution, the Sixth emergency special session of the United Nations General Assembly took place. Soviet military activities were met with strong criticism internationally, including some of its allies at the UN General Assembly (UNGA), but the Soviet machine scored a victory when, in the words of political scientist William Maley, "the General Assembly accepted the credentials of the delegation of the Soviet-installed puppet regime in Kabul which duly voted against the resolution." The UNGA passed a resolution on 15 January by a vote of 104–18 protesting the Soviet intervention in Afghanistan. On 29 January foreign ministers from 34 Muslim-majority countries adopted at the Organisation of Islamic Cooperation a resolution which condemned the Soviet intervention and demanded "the immediate, urgent and unconditional withdrawal of Soviet troops" from the Muslim nation of Afghanistan.

According to the political scientist Gilles Kepel, the Soviet intervention or invasion was viewed with "horror" in the West, considered to be a fresh twist on the geo-political "Great Game" of the 19th century in which Britain feared that Russia sought access to the Indian Ocean, and posed a threat to Western security, explicitly violating the world balance of power agreed upon at Yalta in 1945. The general feeling in the United States was that inaction against the Soviet Union could encourage Moscow to go further in its international ambitions. President Carter placed a trade embargo against the Soviet Union on shipments of commodities such as grain, while also leading a 66-nation boycott of the 1980 Summer Olympics in Moscow. Carter later suspended high-technology exports to the Soviet Union. The invasion, along with other concurrent events such as the Iranian Revolution and the hostage stand-off that accompanied it showed the volatility of the wider region for U.S. foreign policy. This was identified on 4 January during President Carter's Address to the Nation:

Massive Soviet military forces have invaded the small, nonaligned, sovereign nation of Afghanistan, which had hitherto not been an occupied satellite of the Soviet Union. [...] This is a callous violation of international law and the United Nations Charter. [...] If the Soviets are encouraged in this invasion by eventual success, and if they maintain their dominance over Afghanistan and then extend their control to adjacent countries, the stable, strategic, and peaceful balance of the entire world will be changed. This would threaten the security of all nations including, of course, the United States, our allies, and our friends.

— U.S. President Jimmy Carter

China condemned the Soviet coup and its military buildup, calling it a threat to Chinese security (both the Soviet Union and Afghanistan shared borders with China), that it marked the worst escalation of Soviet expansionism in over a decade, and that it was a warning to other Third World leaders with close relations to the Soviet Union. Vice Premier Deng Xiaoping warmly praised the "heroic resistance" of the Afghan people. Beijing also stated that the lacklustre worldwide reaction against Vietnam (in the Sino-Vietnamese War earlier in 1979) encouraged the Soviets to feel free invading Afghanistan.

Ba'athist Syria, led by Hafez al-Assad, was one of the few states outside the Warsaw Pact that publicly favoured the invasion. Soviet Union expanded its military support to the Syrian government in return. The Warsaw Pact Soviet satellites (excluding Romania) publicly supported the intervention; however, a press account in June 1980 showed that Poland, Hungary and Romania privately informed the Soviet Union that the invasion was a damaging mistake.

In his 2009 book, Maley excoriated "the West", which "allowed the issues for these negotiations to be determined substantially by the USSR—a classic weakness of Western negotiating style. On 14 May 1980, the Kabul regime issued at Moscow's behest a statement directed at Iran and Pakistan, outlining a program for a 'political solution' to the 'tension that has come about in this region'. Its program was to be precisely mirrored in the agenda of the subsequent negotiations conducted under UN auspices, which dealt with the withdrawal of the foreign troops, non-interference in the internal affairs of states, international guarantees, and the voluntary return of the refugees to their homes. This was a notable victory for the Soviet Union: the issue of self-determination for the Afghan people, also mentioned by the General Assembly, of course did not figure in Kabul's program, and its exclusion effectively subordinated the General Assembly's conditions for an acceptable settlement to those specified by the Soviet leadership."

=== Military aid ===
Weapons supplies were made available through numerous countries. Before the Soviet intervention, the insurgents received support from the United States, Pakistan, Saudi Arabia, Egypt, Libya and Kuwait, albeit on a limited scale. After the intervention, aid was substantially increased. The US clandestinely purchased all of Israel's captured Soviet weapons, and then funnelled the weapons to the Mujahideen, while Egypt upgraded its army's weapons and sent the older weapons to the militants. Turkey sold their World War II stockpiles to the warlords, and the British and Swiss provided Blowpipe missiles and Oerlikon anti-aircraft guns respectively, after they were found to be poor models for their own forces. China provided the most relevant weapons, likely due to their own experience with guerrilla warfare, and kept meticulous record of all the shipments. The US, Saudi and Chinese aid combined totaled between $6 billion and $12 billion.

=== State of the Cold War ===
In the wider Cold War, drastic changes were taking place in Southwestern Asia concurrent with the 1978–1979 upheavals in Afghanistan that changed the nature of the two superpowers. In February 1979, the Iranian Revolution ousted the American-backed Shah from Iran, losing the United States as one of its most powerful allies. The United States then deployed twenty ships in the Persian Gulf and the Arabian Sea including two aircraft carriers, and there were constant threats of war between the U.S. and Iran.

American observers argued that the global balance of power had shifted to the Soviet Union following the emergence of several pro-Soviet regimes in the Third World in the latter half of the 1970s (such as in Nicaragua and Ethiopia), and the action in Afghanistan demonstrated the Soviet Union's expansionism.

March 1979 marked the signing of the U.S.-backed peace agreement between Israel and Egypt. The Soviet leadership saw the agreement as giving a major advantage to the United States. A Soviet newspaper stated that Egypt and Israel were now "gendarmes of the Pentagon". The Soviets viewed the treaty not only as a peace agreement between their erstwhile allies in Egypt and the US-supported Israelis but also as a military pact. In addition, the US sold more than 5,000 missiles to Saudi Arabia, and the USSR's previously strong relations with Iraq had recently soured, as in June 1978 Iraq began entering into friendlier relations with the Western world and buying French and Italian-made weapons, though the vast majority still came from the Soviet Union, its Warsaw Pact satellites, and China.

The Soviet invasion has also been analyzed with the model of the resource curse. The 1979 Islamic Revolution in Iran saw a massive increase in the scarcity and price of oil, adding tens of billions of dollars to the Soviet economy, as it was the major source of revenue for the USSR that spent 40–60% of its entire federal budget (15% of the GDP) on the military. The oil boom may have overinflated national confidence, serving as a catalyst for the invasion. The Politburo was temporarily relieved of financial constraints and sought to fulfill a long-term geopolitical goal of seizing the lead in the region between Central Asia and the Gulf.

=== December 1979 – February 1980: Occupation and national unrest ===
The first phase of the war began with the Soviet invasion of Afghanistan and first battles with various opposition groups. Soviet troops entered Afghanistan along two ground routes and one air corridor, quickly taking control of the major urban centers, military bases and strategic installations. However, the presence of Soviet troops did not have the desired effect of pacifying the country. On the contrary, it exacerbated nationalistic sentiment, causing the rebellion to spread further. Babrak Karmal, Afghanistan's new leader, charged the Soviets with causing an increase in the unrest, and demanded that the 40th Army step in and quell the rebellion, as his own army had proved untrustworthy. Thus, Soviet troops found themselves drawn into fighting against urban uprisings, tribal armies (called lashkar), and sometimes against mutinying Afghan Army units. These forces mostly fought in the open, and Soviet airpower and artillery made short work of them.

The Soviet occupation provoked a great deal of fear and unrest amongst a wide spectrum of the Afghan populace. The Soviets held the view that their presence would be accepted after having rid Afghanistan of the "tyrannical" Khalq regime, but this was not to be. In the first week of January 1980, attacks against Soviet soldiers in Kabul became common, with roaming soldiers often assassinated in the city in broad daylight by civilians. In the summer of that year, numerous members of the ruling party would be assassinated in individual attacks. The Soviet Army quit patrolling Kabul in January 1981 after their losses due to terrorism, handing the responsibility over to the Afghan army. Tensions in Kabul peaked during the 3 Hoot uprising on 22 February 1980, when the Soviet soldiers murdered hundreds of protesters. The city uprising took a dangerous turn once again during the student demonstrations of April and May 1980, in which scores of students were killed by soldiers and PDPA sympathizers.

The opposition to the Soviet presence was great nationally, crossing regional, ethnic, and linguistic lines. Never before in Afghan history had this many people been united in opposition against an invading foreign power. A few days after the invasion, civilians in Kandahar rose up against Soviet soldiers, killing a number of them, causing the soldiers to withdraw to their garrison. 130 Khalqists were murdered in Kandahar between January and February 1980.

According to the Mitrokhin Archive, the Soviet Union deployed numerous active measures at the beginning of the intervention, spreading disinformation relating to both diplomatic status and military intelligence. These efforts focused on most countries bordering Afghanistan, on several international powers, the Soviet's main adversary, the United States, and neutral countries. The disinformation was deployed primarily by "leaking" forged documents, distributing leaflets, publishing nominally independent articles in Soviet-aligned press, and conveying reports to embassies through KGB residencies. Among the active measures pursued in 1980–1982 were both pro- and anti-separatist documents disseminated in Pakistan, a forged letter implying a Pakistani-Iranian alliance, alleged reports of U.S. bases on the Iranian border, information regarding Pakistan's military intentions filtered through the Pakistan embassy in Bangkok to the Carter Administration, and various disinformation about armed interference by India, Sri Lanka, Bangladesh, Nepal, Indonesia, Jordan, Italy, and France, among others.

== Soviet occupation, 1980–1985 ==
=== Soviet military operations against Afghan guerrillas ===
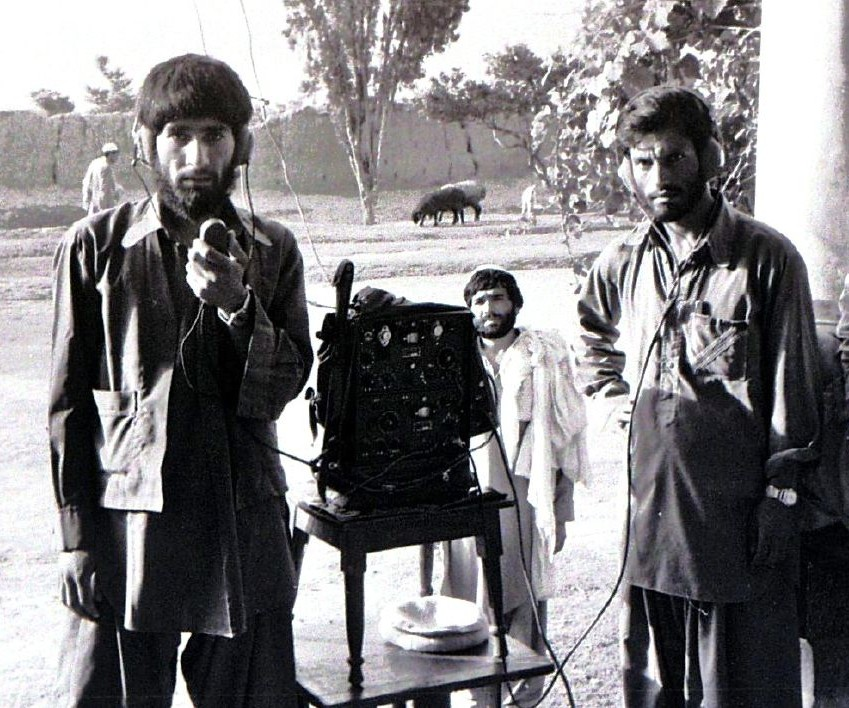
A Mujahideen fighter in Kunar uses a communications receiver.

The Soviets occupied the cities and main axes of communication, while the Afghan mujahideen, which the Soviet Army soldiers called 'Dushman' (enemy), divided into small groups and waged a guerrilla war in the mountains. Almost 80 percent of the country was outside government control. Soviet troops were deployed in strategic areas in the northeast, especially along the road from Termez to Kabul. In the west, a strong Soviet presence was maintained to counter Iranian influence. Incidentally, special Soviet units would have also performed secret attacks on Iranian territory to destroy suspected Mujahideen bases, and their helicopters then got engaged in shootings with Iranian jets. Conversely, some regions such as Nuristan, in the northeast, and Hazarajat, in the central mountains of Afghanistan, were virtually untouched by the fighting, and lived in almost complete independence. Bashgal, in Nuristan, was additionally a Salafi quasi-state known as the Islamic Revolutionary State of Afghanistan. Parts of Kunar, Laghman and Nangarhar were also incorporated into the short-lived Islamic Emirate of Kunar after the Soviet withdrawal from Afghanistan.

Periodically the Soviet Army undertook multi-divisional offensives into Mujahideen-controlled areas. Between 1980 and 1985, nine offensives were launched into the strategically important Panjshir Valley, but government control in the area did not improve. Heavy fighting also occurred in the provinces neighbouring Pakistan, where cities and government outposts were constantly besieged by the Mujahideen. Massive Soviet operations would regularly break these sieges, but the Mujahideen would return as soon as the Soviets left. In the west and south, fighting was more sporadic, except in the cities of Herat and Kandahar, which were always partly controlled by the resistance.

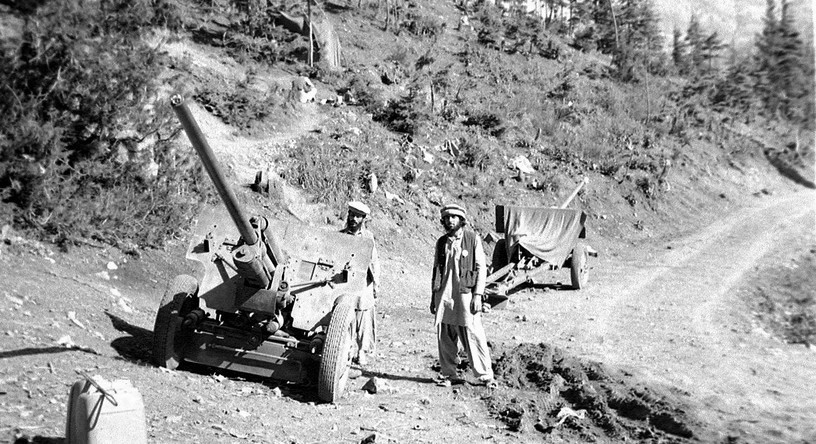
Mujahideen with two captured field guns in Jaji, 1984

The Soviets did not initially foresee taking on such an active role in fighting the rebels and attempted to play down their role there as giving light assistance to the Afghan army. The arrival of the Soviets had the opposite effect as it incensed instead of pacified the people, causing the Mujahideen to gain in strength and numbers. Originally the Soviets thought that their forces would strengthen the backbone of the Afghan army and provide assistance by securing major cities, lines of communication and transport. The Afghan army forces had a high desertion rate and were loath to fight, especially since the Soviet forces pushed them into infantry roles while they manned the armored vehicles and artillery. The main reason that the Afghan soldiers were so ineffective, though, was poor morale, as many of them were not truly loyal to the communist government but simply wanting a paycheck. Once it became apparent that the Soviets would have to get their hands dirty, they followed three main strategies aimed at quelling the uprising. Intimidation was the first strategy, in which the Soviets would use airborne attacks and armored ground attacks to destroy villages, livestock and crops in troubled areas. The Soviets would bomb villages that were near sites of guerrilla attacks on Soviet convoys or known to support resistance groups. Local peoples were forced to either flee their homes or die as daily Soviet attacks made it impossible to live in these areas. By forcing Afghans to flee their homes, the Soviets hoped to deprive the guerrillas of resources and havens. The second strategy consisted of subversion, which entailed sending spies to join resistance groups, as well as bribing local tribes or guerrilla leaders into ceasing operations. Finally, the Soviets used military forays into contested territories to root out the guerrillas and limit their options. Classic search and destroy operations were implemented using Mil Mi-24 helicopter gunships that would provide cover for ground forces in armored vehicles. Once the villages were occupied by Soviet forces, inhabitants who remained were frequently interrogated and tortured for information or killed.

Afghanistan is our Vietnam. Look at what has happened. We began by simply backing a friendly regime; slowly we got more deeply involved; then we started manipulating the regime – sometimes using desperate measures – and now? Now we are bogged down in a war we cannot win and cannot abandon.[...] but for Brezhnev and company we would never have got into it in the first place.

— Vladimir Kuzichkin, a KGB defector, 1982

To complement their brute force approach to weeding out the insurgency, the Soviets used KHAD (Afghan secret police) to gather intelligence, infiltrate the Mujahideen, spread false information, bribe tribal militias into fighting and organize a government militia. While it is impossible to know exactly how successful KHAD was in infiltrating Mujahideen groups, it is thought that they succeeded in penetrating a good many resistance groups based in Afghanistan, Pakistan and Iran. KHAD is thought to have had particular success in igniting internal rivalries and political divisions amongst the resistance groups, rendering some of them completely useless because of infighting. KHAD had some success in securing tribal loyalties but many of these relationships were fickle and temporary. Often KHAD secured neutrality agreements rather than committed political alignment.

The Sarandoy were a centrally commanded government paramilitary group placed under the control of the Ministry of Interior Affairs, before being placed under the control of the unified Ministry of State Security (WAD) in 1986. They had mixed success in the war, as the Arab mujahideen fought the Sarandoy's 7th Operative Regiment, only to fail and sustain massive casualties. The label "Sarandoy" additionally included traffic police, provincial officers and corrections/labor facility officers. Large salaries and proper weapons attracted a good number of recruits to the cause, even if they were not necessarily "pro-communist". The problem was that many of the recruits they attracted were in fact Mujahideen who would join up to procure arms, ammunition and money while also gathering information about forthcoming military operations. By the end of 1981, there were reports of Bulgarian Armed Forces present in Mazar-i-Sharif, the Warsaw Pact and the Cuban Revolutionary Armed Forces all operating in Afghanistan. A fighter of the Mujahideen, describing the Cubans in combat, said they were "big and black and shout very loudly when they fight. Unlike the Russians they were not afraid to attack us in the open".

In 1985, the size of the LCOSF (Limited Contingent of Soviet Forces) was increased to 108,800 and fighting increased throughout the country, making 1985 the bloodiest year of the war. However, despite suffering heavily, the Mujahideen were able to remain in the field, mostly because they received thousands of new volunteers daily, and continued resisting the Soviets

=== Reforms of the Karmal administration ===
Babrak Karmal, after the invasion, promised reforms to win support from the population alienated by his ousted predecessors. A temporary constitution, the Fundamental Principles of the Democratic Republic of Afghanistan, was adopted in April 1980. On paper, it was a democratic constitution including "right of free expression" and disallowing "torture, persecution, and punishment, contrary to human dignity". Karmal's government was formed of his fellow Parchamites along with (pro-Taraki) Khalqists, and a number of known non-communists/leftists in various ministries.

Karmal called his regime "a new evolutionary phase of the glorious April Revolution", but he failed at uniting the PDPA. In the eyes of many Afghans, he was still seen as a "puppet" of the Soviet Union.

=== Mujahideen insurrection ===
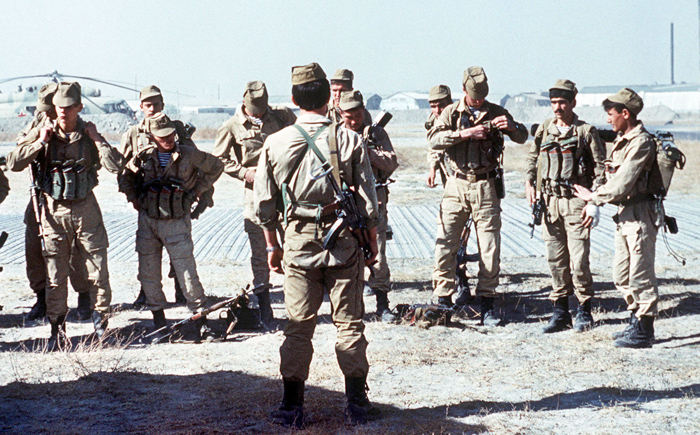
A Soviet Spetsnaz (special operations) group prepares for a mission in Afghanistan, 1988.

In the mid-1980s, the Afghan resistance movement, assisted by the United States, Pakistan, Saudi Arabia, the United Kingdom, Egypt, the People's Republic of China and others, contributed to Moscow's high military costs and strained international relations. The U.S. viewed the conflict in Afghanistan as an integral Cold War struggle, and the CIA provided assistance to anti-Soviet forces through the Pakistani intelligence services, in a program called Operation Cyclone.

Pakistan's North-West Frontier Province became a base for the Afghan resistance fighters and the Deobandi ulama of that province played a significant role in the Afghan 'jihad', with Darul Uloom Haqqania becoming a prominent organisational and networking base for the anti-Soviet Afghan fighters. As well as money, Muslim countries provided thousands of volunteer fighters known as "Afghan Arabs", who wished to wage jihad against the atheist communists. Notable among them was a young Saudi named Osama bin Laden, whose Arab group eventually evolved into al-Qaeda. Despite their numbers, the contribution has been called a "curious sideshow to the real fighting," with only an estimated 2000 of them fighting "at any one time", compared with about 250,000 Afghan fighters and 125,000 Soviet troops.

Their efforts were also sometimes counterproductive, as in the March 1989 battle for Jalalabad, when they showed the enemy the fate awaiting infidels in the form of a truck filled with dismembered bodies of their comrades chopped to pieces after surrendering to radical non-Afghan salafists. Though demoralized by the abandonment of them by the Soviets, the Afghan Communist government forces rallied to break the siege of Jalalabad and to win the first major government victory in years. "This success reversed the government's demoralization from the withdrawal of Soviet forces, renewed its determination to fight on, and allowed it to survive three more years."

Maoist guerrilla groups were also active, to a lesser extent compared to the religious Mujahideen. A notable Maoist group was the Liberation Organization of the People of Afghanistan (SAMA), whose founder and leader Abdul Majid Kalakani was reportedly arrested in 1980.

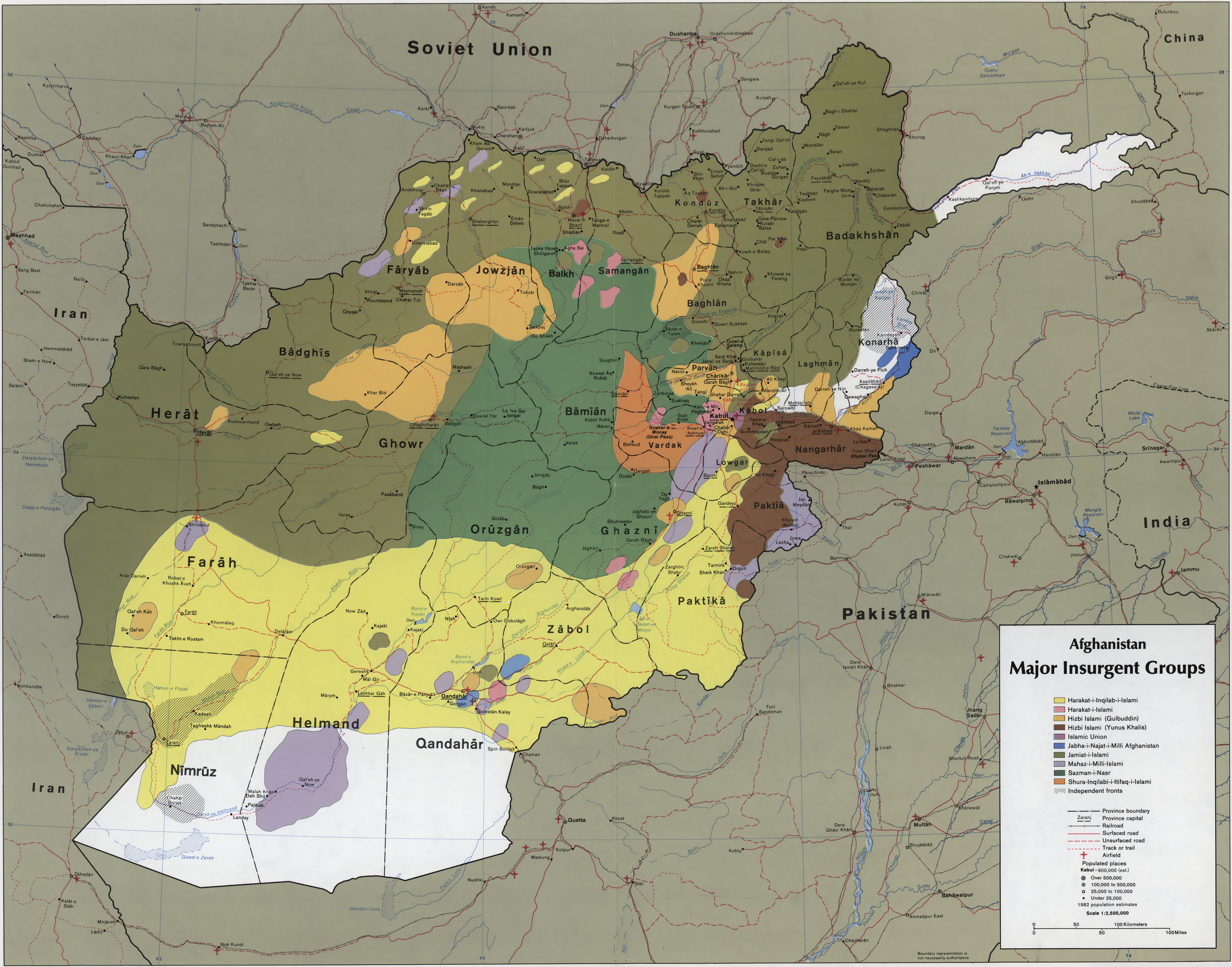
The areas where the different Mujahideen forces operated in 1985

Afghanistan's resistance movement was born in chaos, spread and triumphed chaotically, and did not find a way to govern differently. Virtually all of its war was waged locally by regional warlords. As warfare became more sophisticated, outside support and regional coordination grew. Even so, the basic units of Mujahideen organization and action continued to reflect the highly segmented nature of Afghan society.

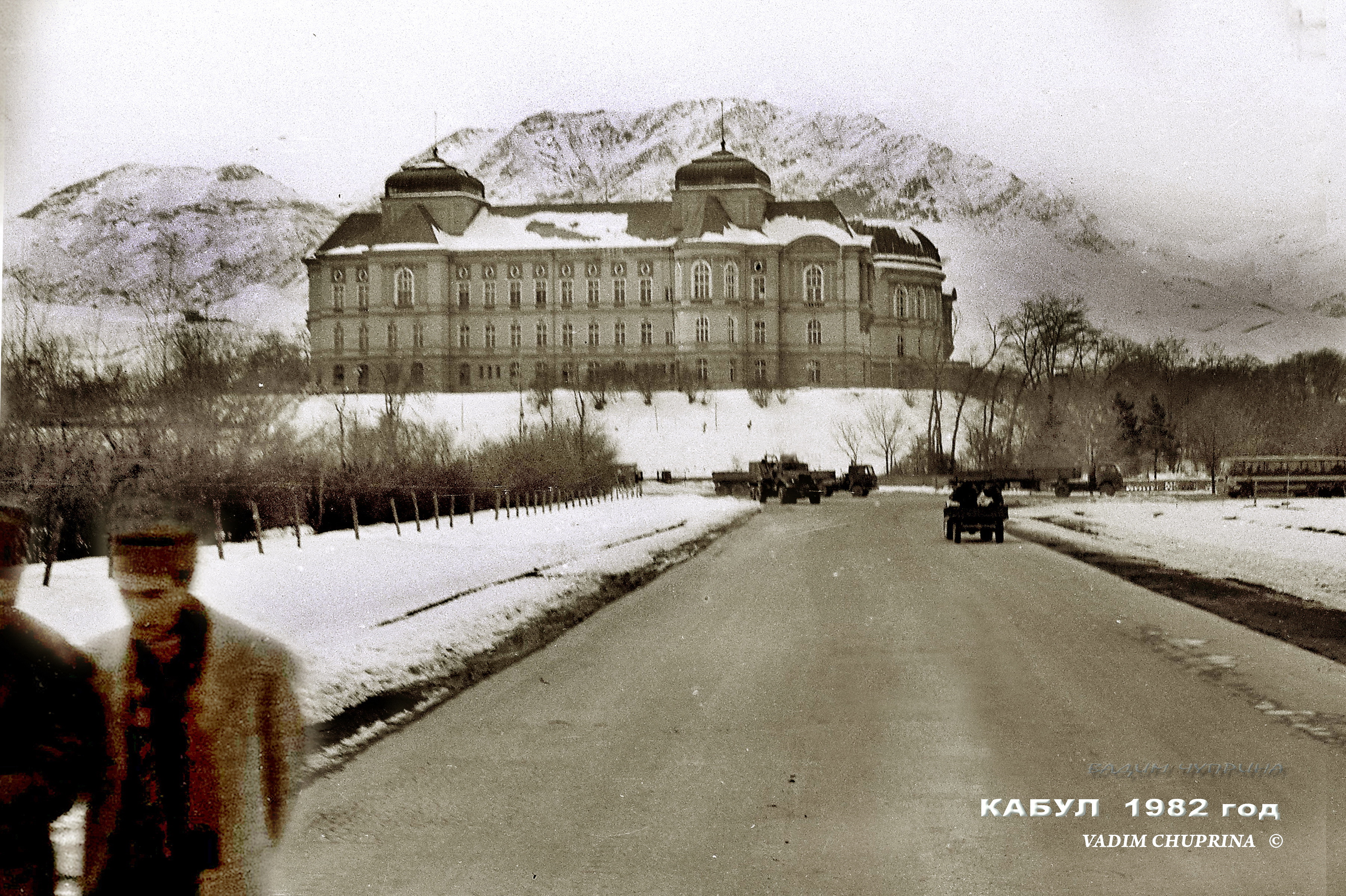
Darul Aman Palace in 1982, general headquarters of the Afghan Army

Olivier Roy estimates that after four years of war, there were at least 4,000 bases from which Mujahideen units operated. Most of these were affiliated with the seven expatriate parties headquartered in Pakistan, which served as sources of supply and varying degrees of supervision. Significant commanders typically led 300 or more men, controlled several bases and dominated a district or a sub-division of a province. Hierarchies of organization above the bases were attempted. Their operations varied greatly in scope, the most ambitious being achieved by Ahmad Shah Massoud of the Panjshir valley north of Kabul. He led at least 10,000 trained troopers at the end of the Soviet war and had expanded his political control of Tajik-dominated areas to Afghanistan's northeastern provinces under the Supervisory Council of the North.

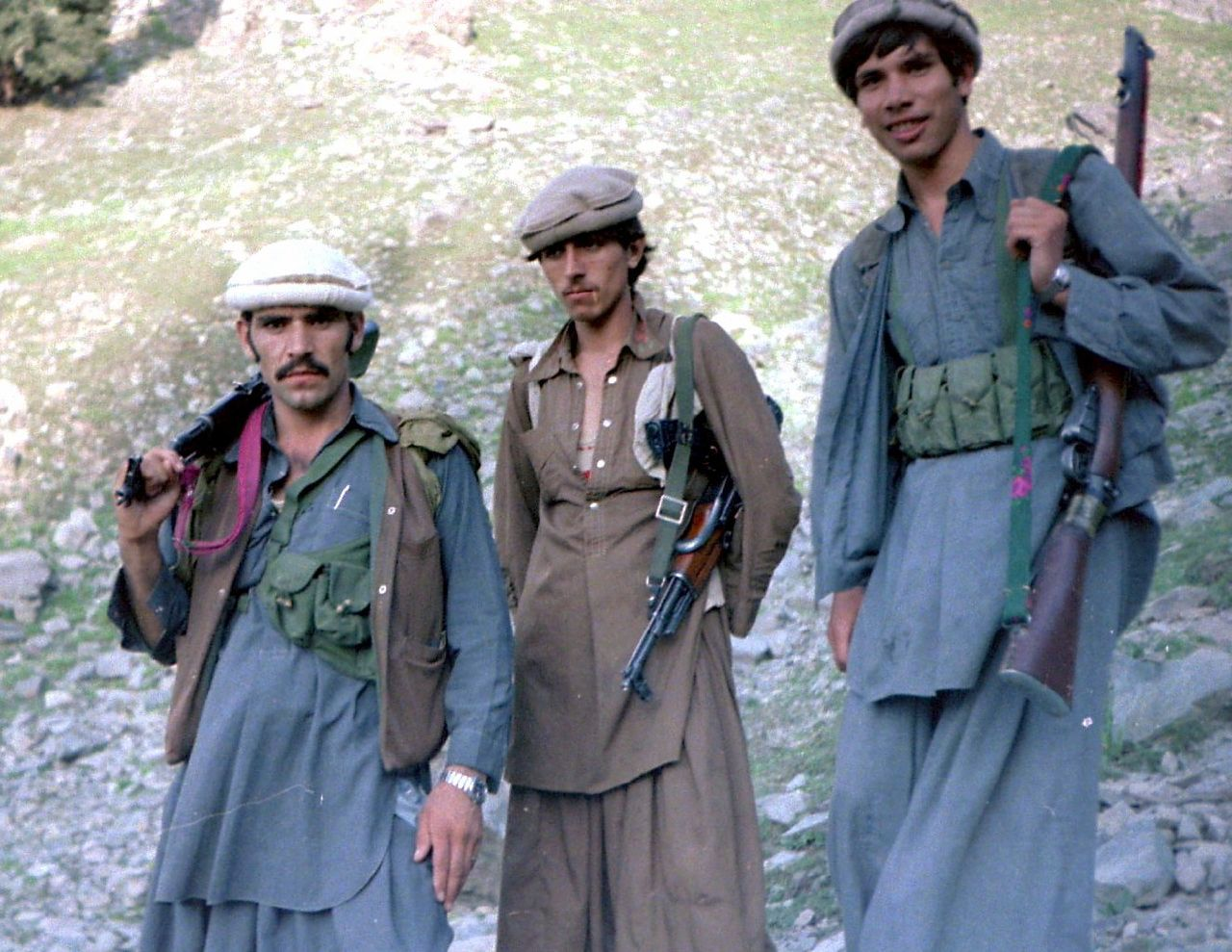
Three mujahideen in Asmar, 1985

Roy also describes regional, ethnic and sectarian variations in Mujahideen organization. In the Pashtun areas of the east, south and southwest, tribal structure, with its many rival sub-divisions, provided the basis for military organization and leadership. Mobilization could be readily linked to traditional fighting allegiances of the tribal lashkar (fighting force). In favorable circumstances such formations could quickly reach more than 10,000, as happened when large Soviet assaults were launched in the eastern provinces, or when the Mujahideen besieged towns, such as Khost in Paktia province in July 1983. But in campaigns of the latter type the traditional explosions of manpower—customarily common immediately after the completion of harvest—proved obsolete when confronted by well dug-in defenders with modern weapons. Lashkar durability was notoriously short; few sieges succeeded.

Mujahideen mobilization in non-Pashtun regions faced very different obstacles. Prior to the intervention, few non-Pashtuns possessed firearms. Early in the war they were most readily available from army troops or gendarmerie who defected or were ambushed. The international arms market and foreign military support tended to reach the minority areas last. In the northern regions, little military tradition had survived upon which to build an armed resistance. Mobilization mostly came from political leadership closely tied to Islam. Roy contrasts the social leadership of religious figures in the Persian- and Turkic-speaking regions of Afghanistan with that of the Pashtuns. Lacking a strong political representation in a state dominated by Pashtuns, minority communities commonly looked to pious learned or charismatically revered pirs (saints) for leadership. Extensive Sufi and maraboutic networks were spread through the minority communities, readily available as foundations for leadership, organization, communication and indoctrination. These networks also provided for political mobilization, which led to some of the most effective of the resistance operations during the war.

The Mujahideen favoured sabotage operations. The more common types of sabotage included damaging power lines, knocking out pipelines and radio stations, blowing up government office buildings, air terminals, hotels, cinemas, and so on. In the border region with Pakistan, the Mujahideen would often launch 800 rockets per day. Between April 1985 and January 1987, they carried out over 23,500 shelling attacks on government targets. The Mujahideen surveyed firing positions that they normally located near villages within the range of Soviet artillery posts, putting the villagers in danger of death from Soviet retaliation. The Mujahideen used land mines heavily. Often, they would enlist the services of the local inhabitants, even children.

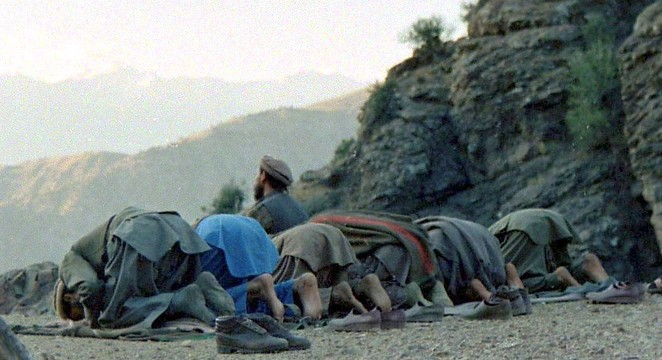
Mujahideen praying in Shultan Valley, 1987

They concentrated on both civilian and military targets, knocking out bridges, closing major roads, attacking convoys, disrupting the electric power system and industrial production, and attacking police stations and Soviet military installations and air bases. They assassinated government officials and PDPA members, and laid siege to small rural outposts. In March 1982, a bomb exploded at the Ministry of Education, damaging several buildings. In the same month, a widespread power failure darkened Kabul when a pylon on the transmission line from the Naghlu power station was blown up. In June 1982 a column of about 1,000 young communist party members sent out to work in the Panjshir valley were ambushed within 30 km of Kabul, with heavy loss of life. On 4 September 1985, insurgents shot down a domestic Bakhtar Airlines plane as it took off from Kandahar airport, killing all 52 people aboard.

Mujahideen groups used for assassination had three to five men in each. After they received their mission to kill certain government officials, they busied themselves with studying his pattern of life and its details and then selecting the method of fulfilling their established mission. They practiced shooting at automobiles, shooting out of automobiles, laying mines in government accommodation or houses, using poison, and rigging explosive charges in transport.

In May 1985, the seven principal rebel organizations formed the Seven Party Mujahideen Alliance to coordinate their military operations against the Soviet Army. Late in 1985, the groups were active in and around Kabul, unleashing rocket attacks and conducting operations against the communist government.

==== Raids inside Soviet territory ====
Afghan mujahideen raids inside the Soviet Union during the Soviet–Afghan War were an effort to foment unrest and rebellion by the Muslim populations of the Soviet Union, starting in late 1984 Director of CIA William Casey encouraged mujahideen militants to mount sabotage raids inside the Soviet Union, according to Robert Gates, Casey's executive assistant and Mohammed Yousef, the Pakistani ISI brigadier general who was the chief for Afghan operations. With the help of Britain's MI6, the rebels began cross-border raids into the Soviet Union in spring 1985.

In August 1985, Afghan mujahideen bombed a Soviet military airbase in Krasnovodsk, Turkmenistan. Three soldiers were killed. In January 1987 a bomb exploded on a Moscow-bound train in northwestern Uzbekistan, killing three citizens. The attack was likely meant to target Soviet troops. In April 1987 three separate teams of Afghan rebels were directed by the ISI to launch coordinated raids on multiple targets across the Soviet border and extending, in the case of an attack on an Uzbek factory, as deep as over 16 kilometres (10 mi) into Soviet territory.

Pakistan's ISI requested limpet mines from Britain in the hope of attacking Soviet transport barges on the South bank of the Amu Darya River. MI6 facilitated the attacks which included the limpets. In this they were successful in destroying a number of barges as well as damaging the bridge pylons spanning the river near Termez.

CIA director William Casey secretly visited Pakistan numerous times to meet with the ISI officers managing the mujahideen, and personally observed the guerrillas training on at least one occasion. Coll reports that

Casey startled his Pakistani hosts by proposing that they take the Afghan war into enemy territory—into the Soviet Union itself. Casey wanted to ship subversive propaganda through Afghanistan to the Soviet Union's predominantly Muslim southern republics. The Pakistanis agreed, and the CIA soon supplied thousands of Korans, as well as books on Soviet atrocities in Uzbekistan and tracts on historical heroes of Uzbek nationalism, according to Pakistani and Western officials.

The UK's role in the war entailed direct military involvement not only in Afghanistan but the Central Asian republics of the Soviet Union. From 1984, in conjunction with the CIA and ISI, MI6 helped organize and execute "scores" of guerrilla-style attacks. These included rocket attacks on villages in Tajikistan and raids on Soviet airfields, troop supplies and convoys in Uzbekistan which flowed through these areas, some 25 kilometers in these territories. These were the first direct Western attacks on the Soviet Union since the 1950s and they reached their peak in 1986. MI6 directly remitted money into an account of Pakistani leader of Jamaat-e-Islami Qazi Hussain Ahmad who had close links with Hekmatyar and Massoud. MI6's aim was for Ahmad to spread radical and anti-Soviet Islamic literature in the Soviet republics in the hope of rebellions against their Communist governments. These went as far as Chechnya and Bosnia. The uprisings did not occur but the Soviets were concerned about potential uprisings during the war and even threatened retaliation with bombings in Pakistan.

==== Media reaction ====
Those hopelessly brave warriors I walked with, and their families, who suffered so much for faith and freedom and who are still not free, they were truly the people of God.

— Journalist Rob Schultheis, 1992

International journalistic perception of the war varied. Major American television journalists were sympathetic to the Mujahideen. Most visible was CBS News correspondent Dan Rather, who in 1982 accused the Soviet Union of genocide, comparing them to Hitler. Rather was embedded with the Mujahideen for a 60 Minutes report. In 1987, CBS produced a full documentary special on the war.

Reader's Digest took a highly positive view of the Mujahideen, a reversal of their usual view of Islamic fighters. The publication praised their martyrdom and their role in entrapping the Soviets in a Vietnam War-style disaster.

Leftist journalist Alexander Cockburn was unsympathetic, criticizing Afghanistan as "an unspeakable country filled with unspeakable people, sheepshaggers and smugglers, who have furnished in their leisure hours some of the worst arts and crafts ever to penetrate the occidental world. I yield to none in my sympathy to those prostrate beneath the Russian jackboot, but if ever a country deserved rape it's Afghanistan." Robert D. Kaplan on the other hand, thought any perception of Mujahideen as "barbaric" was unfair: "Documented accounts of mujahidin savagery were relatively rare and involved enemy troops only. Their cruelty toward civilians was unheard of during the war, while Soviet cruelty toward civilians was common." Lack of interest in the Mujahideen cause, Kaplan believed, was not the lack of intrinsic interest to be found in a war between a small, poor country and a superpower where a million civilians were killed, but the result of the great difficulty and unprofitability of media coverage. Kaplan noted that "none of the American TV networks had a bureau for a war", and television cameramen venturing to follow the Mujahideen "trekked for weeks on little food, only to return ill and half starved". In October 1984, the Soviet ambassador to Pakistan, Vitaly Smirnov, told Agence France Presse "that journalists traveling with the mujahidin 'will be killed. And our units in Afghanistan will help the Afghan forces to do it.'" Unlike Vietnam and Lebanon, Afghanistan had "absolutely no clash between the strange and the familiar", no "rock-video quality" of "zonked-out GIs in headbands" or "rifle-wielding Shiite terrorists wearing Michael Jackson T-shirts" that provided interesting "visual materials" for newscasts.

== Soviet exit and change of Afghan leadership, 1985–1989 ==
=== Foreign diplomatic efforts ===
As early as 1983, Pakistan's Foreign Ministry began working with the Soviet Union to provide them an exit from Afghanistan, initiatives led by Foreign Minister Yaqub Ali Khan and Khurshid Kasuri. Despite an active support for insurgent groups, Pakistanis remained sympathetic to the challenges faced by the Soviets in restoring the peace, eventually exploring the possibility of setting up an interim system of government under former monarch Zahir Shah, but this was not authorized by President Zia-ul-Haq due to his stance on the issue of the Durand Line. In 1984–85, Foreign Minister Yaqub Ali Khan paid state visits to China, Saudi Arabia, Soviet Union, France, United States and the United Kingdom in order to develop a framework. On 20 July 1987, the withdrawal of Soviet troops from the country was announced.

=== April 1985 – January 1987: Exit strategy ===
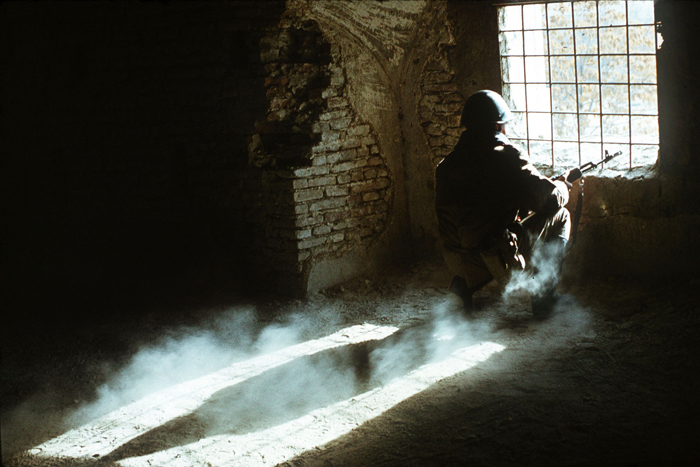
Soviet soldier in Afghanistan, 1988

The first step of the Soviet Union's exit strategy was to transfer the burden of fighting the Mujahideen to the Afghan armed forces, with the aim of preparing them to operate without Soviet help. During this phase, the Soviet contingent was restricted to supporting the DRA forces by providing artillery, air support and technical assistance, though some large-scale operations were still carried out by Soviet troops.

Under Soviet guidance, the DRA armed forces were built up to an official strength of 302,000 in 1986. To minimize the risk of a coup d'état, they were divided into different branches, each modeled on its Soviet counterpart. The ministry of defence forces numbered 132,000, the ministry of interior 70,000 and the ministry of state security (KHAD) 80,000. However, these were theoretical figures: in reality each service was plagued with desertions, the army alone suffering over 10% annual losses, or 32,000 per year.

The decision to engage primarily Afghan forces was taken by the Soviets, but was resented by the PDPA, who viewed the departure of their protectors without enthusiasm. In May 1987 a DRA force attacked well-entrenched Mujahideen positions in the Arghandab District, but the Mujahideen managed to hold their ground, and the attackers suffered heavy casualties. Meanwhile, the Mujahideen benefited from expanded foreign military support from the United States, United Kingdom, Saudi Arabia, Pakistan, and other Muslim-majority countries. Two Heritage Foundation foreign policy analysts, Michael Johns and James A. Phillips, championed Ahmad Shah Massoud as the Afghan resistance leader most worthy of US support under the Reagan Doctrine.

=== May 1986 – 1988: Najibullah and his reforms ===
The government of President Karmal, a puppet state, was largely ineffective. It was weakened by divisions within the PDPA and the Parcham faction, and the regime's efforts to expand its base of support proved futile. Moscow came to regard Karmal as a failure and blamed him for the problems. Years later, when Karmal's inability to consolidate his government had become obvious, Mikhail Gorbachev, then General Secretary of the Soviet Communist Party, said, "The main reason that there has been no national consolidation so far is that Comrade Karmal is hoping to continue sitting in Kabul with our help." Karmal's consolidation plan only involved those who had not raised arms against the regime, and even demanded Soviet troops to seal the border with Pakistan before any negotiations with Mujahideen. Eventually, the Soviet Union decided to dispose of Karmal from the leadership of Afghanistan.

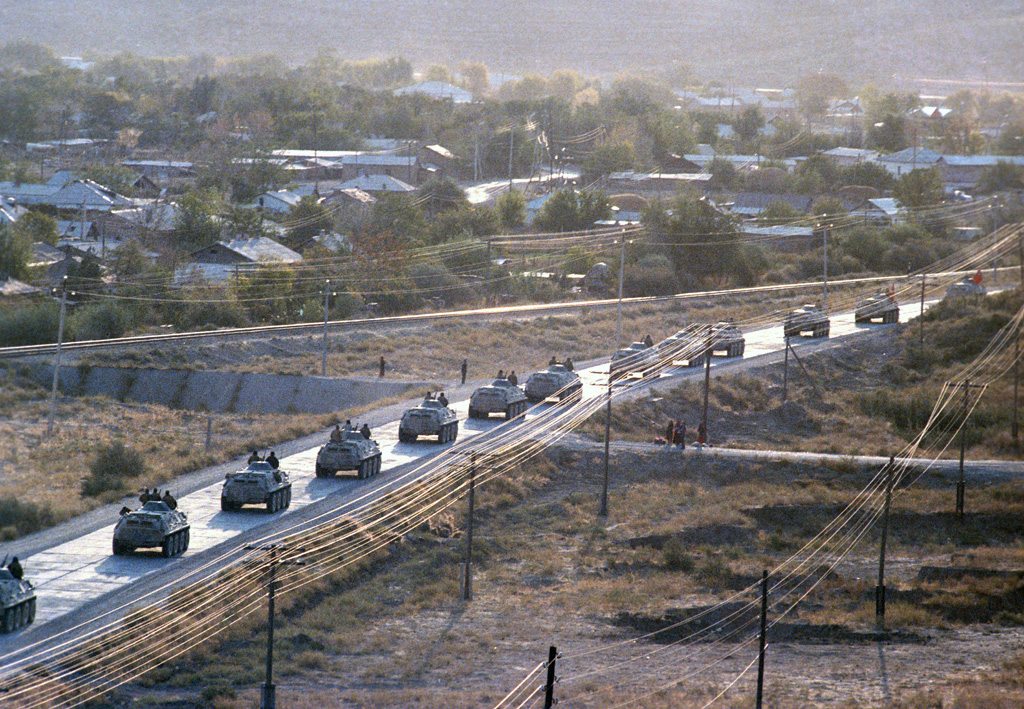
A column of Soviet BTR armored personnel carriers departing from Afghanistan

In May 1986, Mohammad Najibullah, former chief of the Afghan secret police (KHAD), was elected General Secretary and later as President of the Revolutionary Council. The relatively young new leader wasn't known that well to the Afghan population at the time, but he made swift reforms to change the country's situation and win support as devised by experts of the Communist Party of the Soviet Union. An eloquent speaker in both the Pashto and Dari languages, Najibullah engaged with elders and presented both himself and the state as Islamic, sometimes backing his speeches with excerpts from the Qur'an. A number of prisoners were released, while the night curfew in Kabul that had been in place since 1980 was finally lifted. He also moved against pro-Karmal Parchamites, who were expelled from the Revolutionary Council and the Politburo.

President Najibullah launched the "National Reconciliation" program at the start of 1987, the goal of which was to unite the nation and end the war that had enveloped the nation for seven years. He expressed willingness to negotiate with the Mujahideen resistance, allow parties other than the PDPA to be active, and indicated that exiled King Zahir Shah could be part of the process. A six-month ceasefire also began in December 1986. His administration was also more open to foreign visitors outside the Soviet bloc. In November 1987, Najibullah convened a loya jirga selected by the authorities which successfully passed a new constitution for Afghanistan, creating a presidential system with an elective bicameral parliament. The constitution declared "the sacred religion of Islam" the official religion, guaranteed the democratic rights of the individual, made it legal to form "political parties", and promoted equality between the various tribes and nationalities. Despite high expectations, the new policy only had limited impact in regaining support from the population and the resistance, partly because of the high distrust and unpopularity of the PDPA and KHAD, as well as Najibullah's loyalty to Moscow.

As part of the new structure, national parliamentary elections were held in 1988 to elect members of the new National Assembly, the first such elections in Afghanistan in 19 years.

==== Negotiations for a coalition ====
Ex-king Zahir Shah remained a popular figure to most Afghans. Diego Cordovez of the UN also recognized the king as a potential key to a political settlement to the war after the Soviet troops would leave. Polls in 1987 showed that he was a favored figure to lead a potential coalition between the DRA regime and Mujahideen factions, as well as an opposition to the unpopular but powerful guerrilla leader Gulbadin Hekmatyar, who was strongly against the King's return. Pakistan however was against this and refused to grant the ex-king a visa for potential negotiations with Mujahideen. Pakistan's President Zia-ul-Haq and his supporters in the military were determined to put a conservative Islamic ally in power in Kabul.

Negotiations continued and in 1988 through 1989, The Interim Afghan Government was formed in Pekhawar as an alliance of various Mujahadeen groups including Hizb-i Islami and Jamiat-i Islami, and would be involved in Operation Arrow and the siege of Khost.

=== April 1988: The Geneva Accords ===
Following lengthy negotiations, the Geneva Accords was signed in 1988 between Afghanistan and Pakistan. Supported by the Soviet Union and the United States respectively, the two Asian countries agreed to refrain from any form of interference in each other's territory. They also agreed to allow Afghan refugees in Pakistan to voluntarily return. The two superpowers agreed to halt their interference in Afghanistan, which included a Soviet withdrawal.

The United Nations set up a special mission to oversee the process. In this way, President Najibullah had stabilized his political position enough to begin matching Moscow's moves toward withdrawal. Among other things the Geneva Accords identified the US and Soviet non-intervention in the internal affairs of Pakistan and Afghanistan and a timetable for full Soviet withdrawal. The agreement on withdrawal held, and on 15 February 1989, the last Soviet troops departed on schedule from Afghanistan.

=== January 1987 – February 1989: Withdrawal ===
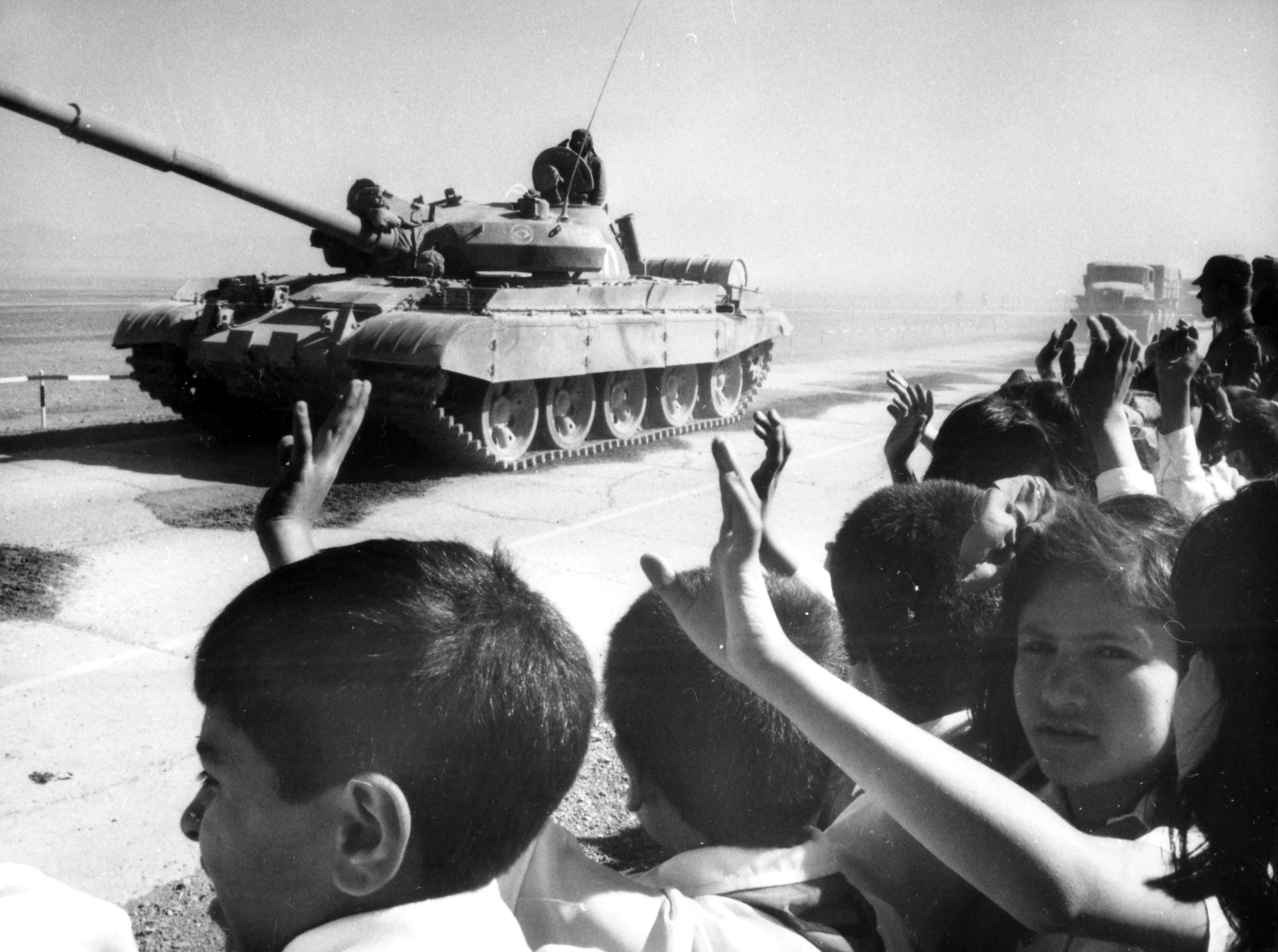
Soviet T-62M main battle tank withdraws from Afghanistan

The promotion of Mikhail Gorbachev to General Secretary in 1985 and his 'new thinking' on foreign and domestic policy was likely an important factor in the Soviets' decision to withdraw. Gorbachev had been attempting to remove the Soviet Union from the economic stagnation that had set in under the leadership of Brezhnev, and to reform the Soviet Union's economy and image with the Glasnost and Perestroika policies. Gorbachev had also been attempting to ease cold war tensions by signing the Intermediate-Range Nuclear Forces Treaty with the U.S. in 1987 and withdrawing the troops from Afghanistan, whose presence had garnered so much international condemnation. Beijing had stipulated that a normalization of relations would have to wait until Moscow withdrew its army from Afghanistan (among other things), and in 1989 the first Sino-Soviet summit in 30 years took place. At the same time, Gorbachev pressured his Cuban allies in Angola to scale down activities and withdraw even though Soviet allies were faring somewhat better there. The Soviets also pulled many of their troops out of Mongolia in 1987, where they were also having a far easier time than in Afghanistan, and restrained the Vietnamese invasion of Kampuchea to the point of an all-out withdrawal in 1988. This massive withdrawal of Soviet forces from such highly contested areas shows that the Soviet government's decision to leave Afghanistan was based upon a general change in Soviet foreign policy – from one of confrontation to avoidance of conflict wherever possible.

In the last phase, Soviet troops prepared and executed their withdrawal from Afghanistan, whilst limiting the launching of offensive operations by those who had not withdrawn yet.

By mid-1987 the Soviet Union announced that it would start withdrawing its forces. Sibghatullah Mojaddedi was selected as the head of the Interim Islamic State of Afghanistan, in an attempt to reassert its legitimacy against the Moscow-sponsored Kabul regime. Mojaddedi, as head of the Interim Afghan Government, met with then-Vice President of the United States George H. W. Bush, achieving a critical diplomatic victory for the Afghan resistance. Defeat of the Kabul government was their solution for peace. This confidence, sharpened by their distrust of the United Nations, virtually guaranteed their refusal to accept a political compromise.

In September 1988, Soviet MiG-23 fighters shot down two Iranian AH-1J Cobra helicopters which had intruded into Afghan airspace.

Operation Magistral was one of the final offensive operations undertaken by the Soviets, a successful sweep operation that cleared the road between the towns of Gardez and Khost. This operation did not have any lasting effect on the outcome of the conflict nor on the soiled political and military status of the Soviets in the eyes of the West but was a symbolic gesture that marked the end of their widely condemned presence in the country with a victory.

The first half of the Soviet contingent was withdrawn from 15 May to 16 August 1988. The withdrawal was suspended by the Soviets on 5 November 1988 due to attacks on Soviet troops. The second half of the Soviet contingent was withdrawn from 15 November to 15 February 1989. In order to ensure a safe passage, the Soviets had negotiated ceasefires with local Mujahideen commanders. The withdrawal was generally executed peacefully except for the operation "Typhoon".

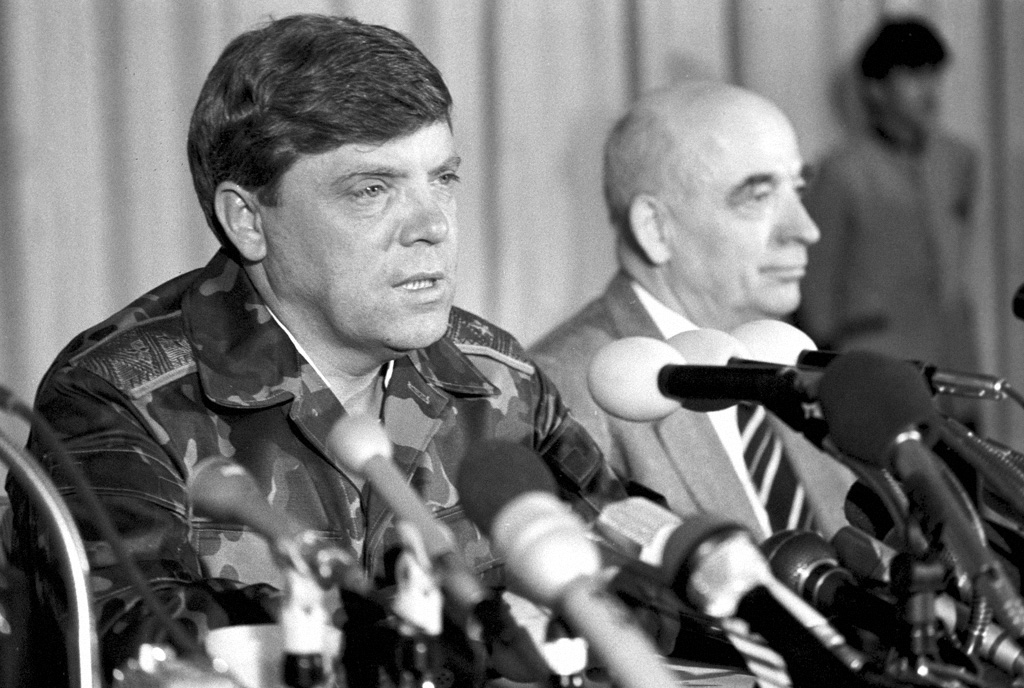
CGen of 40th Army, Boris Gromov, announcing the withdrawal of Soviet contingent forces

General Yazov, the Defense Minister of the Soviet Union, ordered the 40th Army to violate the agreement with Ahmad Shah Massoud, who commanded a large force in the Panjshir Valley, and attack his relaxed and exposed forces. The Soviet attack was initiated to protect Najibullah, who did not have a ceasefire in effect with Massoud, and who rightly feared an offensive by Massoud's forces after the Soviet withdrawal. General Gromov, the 40th Army Commander, objected to the operation, but reluctantly obeyed the order. "Typhoon" began on 23 January and continued for three days. To minimize their own losses, the Soviets abstained from close-range fighting. Instead, they used long-range artillery, surface-to-surface and air-to-surface missiles. Numerous civilian casualties were reported. Massoud had not threatened the withdrawal to this point and did not attack Soviet forces after they breached the agreement. Overall, the Soviet attack represented a defeat for Massoud's forces, who lost 600 fighters killed and wounded.

After the withdrawal of the Soviets, the DRA forces were left fighting alone and had to abandon some provincial capitals, as well as disbanding their air assault brigades a year prior. A year prior to the Soviet withdrawal, the Afghan government established the Guards Corps, being renamed to the Special Guard ('Gard-e Khas'), Republican Guard, and later, the Afghan National Guard. This force included the 22nd and 44th Guard Regiment, as well as the 88th Heavy Artillery Regiment and the 1st Motorized Infantry Brigade. By 1988, the Afghan National Guard had approximately 14,000 officers and personnel organised into two divisions, three infantry brigades, an artillery battalion, a SCUD battalion, and various other units, all equipped with modern weapons and equipment. The force was headquartered at Bala Hissar Fort.

It was widely believed that they would not be able to resist the Mujahideen for long. However, in the spring of 1989, DRA forces inflicted a major defeat on the Mujahideen during the Battle of Jalalabad, as well launching successful assaults on fortified complexes in Paghman in 1990. The United States, having achieved its goal of forcing the Soviet Union's withdrawal from Afghanistan, gradually disengaged itself from the country.

==== Causes of withdrawal ====
Some of the causes of the Soviet Union's withdrawal from Afghanistan leading to the Afghanistan regime's eventual defeat include

- The Soviet Army of 1980 was trained and equipped for large scale, conventional warfare in Central Europe against a similar opponent, i.e., it used armored and motor-rifle formations. This was notably ineffective against small scale guerrilla groups using hit-and-run tactics in the rough terrain of Afghanistan. Also, the Soviet Army's large formations were not mobile enough to engage small groups of Mujahideen fighters that easily merged back into the terrain. The set strategy also meant that troops were discouraged from "tactical initiative", essential in counter insurgency, because it "tended to upset operational timing".
- The Soviets used large-scale offensives against Mujahideen strongholds, such as in the Panjshir Valley, which temporarily cleared those sectors and killed many civilians in addition to enemy combatants. The biggest shortcoming here, though, was the fact that once the Soviets engaged the enemy with force, they failed to hold their ground, as they withdrew once their operation was completed. The killing of civilians further alienated the population from the Soviets, with bad long-term effects.
- The Soviets did not have enough men to fight a counter-insurgency war (COIN), and their troops had low morale. The peak number of Soviet troops during the war was 115,000, but the bulk of these troops were conscripts, which led to poor combat performance in their motor-rifle formations. However, the Soviets did have elite infantry units, such as the famed Spetsnaz, the VDV, and their recon infantry. The problem with their elite units was not combat effectiveness, but that there were not enough of them and that they were employed incorrectly.
- Intelligence gathering, essential for successful COIN, was inadequate. The Soviets overly relied on less-than-accurate aerial recon and radio intercepts rather than their recon infantry and special forces. Although their special forces and recon infantry units performed very well in combat against the Mujahideen, they would have better served in intelligence gathering.
- The concept of a "war of national liberation" against a Soviet-sponsored "revolutionary" regime was so alien to the Soviet dogma that the leadership could not "come to grips" with it. This led to, among other things, a suppression by the Soviet media for several years of the truth about how bad the war was going, which caused a backlash this could no longer be hidden.

== Fall of Najibullah government, 1992 ==
After the withdrawal of Soviet troops in 1989, the government of Mohammad Najibullah remained in power until 15 April 1992. Najibullah stepped down that day as Mujahideen guerrilla forces moved into Kabul during the first Afghan civil war. He attempted to fly to India under the protection of the U.N. but was blocked from leaving at the airport. He then took refuge at a United Nations compound in Kabul. After a bloody, four-year power struggle between different factions of the victorious anti-Najibullah forces, the Taliban took Kabul. They stormed the U.N. compound on 26 September 1996. They eventually tortured and killed Najibullah.

== Aerial engagements ==
=== Aerial losses in Pakistan airspace ===
During the conflict, Pakistan Air Force F-16s shot down ten aircraft belonging to Soviet Union, which had intruded into Pakistani territory. However, the Soviet record only confirmed five kills (three Su-22s, one Su-25 and one An-26). Some sources show that PAF had shot down at least a dozen more aircraft during the war. However, those kills were not officially acknowledged because they took place in Afghanistan's airspace and acknowledging those kills would mean that Afghan airspace was violated by PAF. In all, Pakistan Air Force F-16s had downed several MiG-23s, Su-22s, a Su-25, and an An-24 while losing only one F-16.

=== Stinger missiles and the "Stinger effect" ===
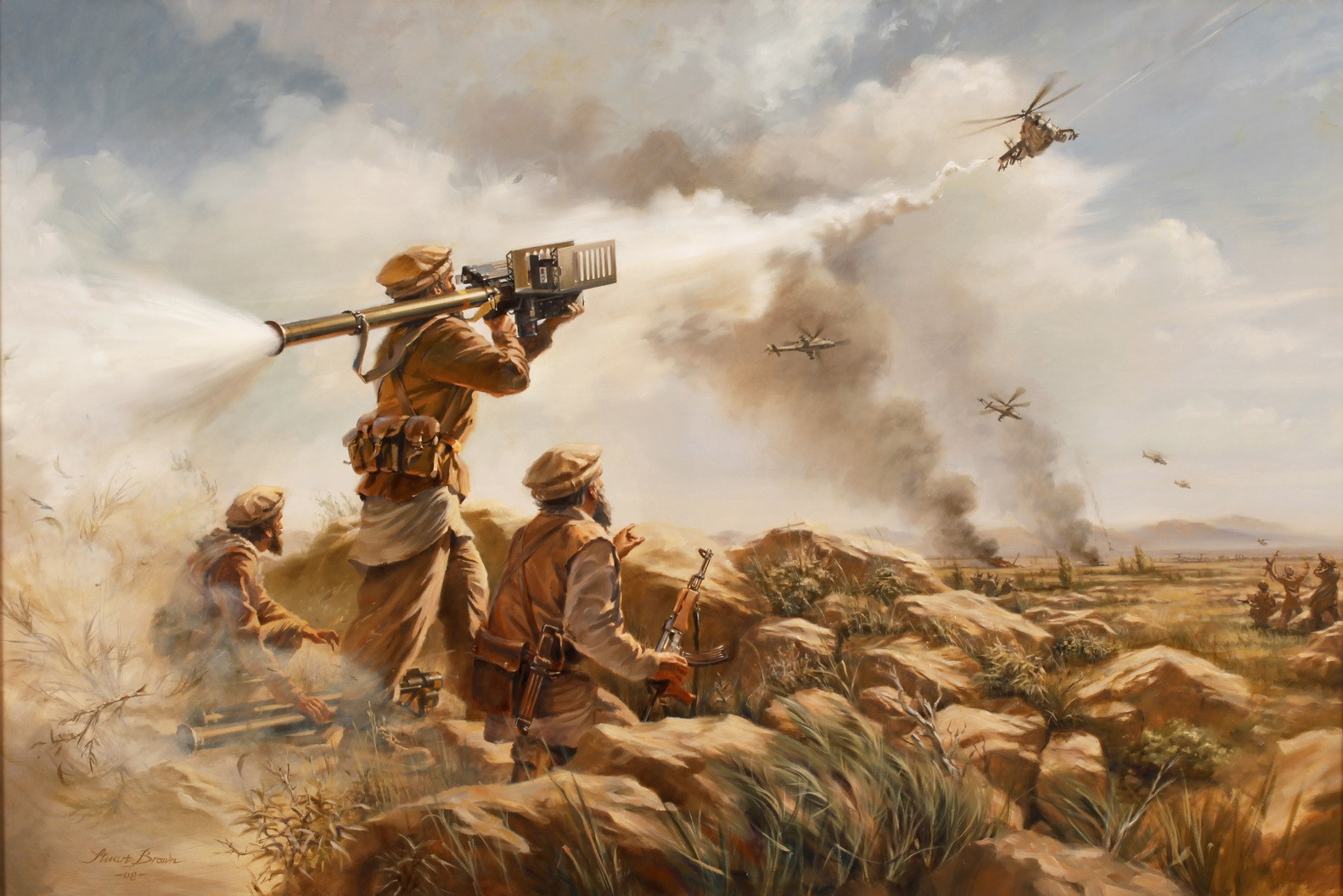
Painting of the first Stinger Missile kill in 1986

Whether the introduction of the personal, portable, infrared-homing Stinger surface-to-air missile in September 1986 was a turning point in the war is disputed. Many Western military analysts credit the Stinger with a kill ratio of about 70% and with responsibility for most of the over 350 Soviet or Afghan government planes and helicopters shot down in the last two years of the war. Some military analysts considered it fundamental and coined the term "Stinger effect" to describe it. Congressman Charlie Wilson claimed that before the Stinger the Mujahideen never won a set piece battle with the Soviets, but after it was introduced, the Mujahideen never again lost one.

The statistics are based on Mujahideen self-reporting, which is of unknown reliability. A Russian general claimed the United States "greatly exaggerated" Soviet and Afghan aircraft losses during the war. According to Soviet figures, in 1987–1988, only 35 planes and 63 helicopters were destroyed by all causes. The Pakistan Army fired twenty-eight Stingers at Soviet aircraft near the border without a kill.

Many Russian military analysts tend to be dismissive of the impact of the Stinger. Soviet General Secretary Mikhail Gorbachev decided to withdraw from Afghanistan a year before the Mujahideen fired their first Stinger missiles; Gorbachev was motivated by U.S. sanctions, not military losses. The Stingers did make an impact at first but within a few months flares, beacons, and exhaust baffles were installed to disorient the missiles, while night operation and terrain-hugging tactics tended to prevent the rebels from getting a clear shot. By 1988 the Mujahideen had all but stopped firing them. Stingers also forced Soviet helicopters and ground attack planes to bomb from higher altitudes with less accuracy but did not bring down many more aircraft than Chinese heavy machine guns and other less sophisticated anti-aircraft weaponry. Gorbachev stated in an interview in 2010 that the Stinger did not influence his decision-making process.

== War crimes ==
Atrocity crimes in the Soviet–Afghan War were systematically perpetrated on a large scale by the Soviet Union and its allies from 1979 to 1989, with several scholars and academics concluding that the Soviet military forces carried out a campaign of genocide against Afghans. The war resulted in the deaths of between 1,000,000 and 3,000,000 Afghans. Estimates of Afghan civilian deaths vary from 562,000 to 2,000,000. Human Rights Watch concluded that the Soviet Red Army and the Afghan Army perpetrated war crimes and crimes against humanity in Afghanistan, intentionally targeting civilians and civilian areas for attack, and killing and torturing prisoners.

== Foreign involvement ==
The Afghan mujahideen were backed primarily by Pakistan, the United States, Saudi Arabia, and the United Kingdom making it a Cold War proxy war. Out of the countries that supported the Mujahideen, the U.S. (with Operation Cyclone) and Saudi Arabia offered the greatest financial support. However, private donors and religious charities throughout the Muslim world—particularly in the Persian Gulf—raised considerably more funds for the Afghan rebels than any foreign government; Jason Burke recounts that "as little as 25 per cent of the money for the Afghan jihad was actually supplied directly by states." Saudi Arabia was heavily involved in the war effort and matched the United States' contributions dollar-for-dollar in public funds. Saudi Arabia also gathered an enormous amount of money for the Afghan mujahideen in private donations that amounted to about $20 million per month at their peak. The United Kingdom on the other hand played more of a direct combat role, through MI6 and the Special Air Service — supporting resistance groups in practical manners.

Other countries that supported the Mujahideen were Egypt and China. Iran on the other hand only supported the Shia Mujahideen, namely the Persian-speaking Shia Hazara groups in a limited way. One of these groups was the Tehran Eight, a political union of Afghan Shia. They were supplied predominantly by the Islamic Revolutionary Guard Corps (IRGC), but Iran's support for the Hazaras nevertheless frustrated efforts for a united Mujahideen front.

== Spillover ==
=== Raids inside the Soviet Union ===
The Mujahideen launched raids into the Soviet Union to foment unrest and rebellion by the Islamic populations of the Soviet Union, starting in late 1984 Director of CIA William Casey as well as Britain's MI6, encouraged Mujahideen militants to mount sabotage raids inside the Soviet Union, according to Robert Gates, Casey's executive assistant and Mohammed Yousef, the Pakistani Inter-Services Intelligence (ISI) brigadier general who was the chief for Afghan operations. The rebels began cross-border raids into the Soviet Union in the spring of 1985.

=== Engagement in Pakistan ===
During the conflict, Soviet aircraft intruded into Pakistani airspace multiple times and Pakistan Air Force F-16 had shot down ten aircraft belonging to Soviet Union, which had intruded into Pakistani territory. However, the Soviet record only confirmed five plane kills (three Su-22s, one Su-25 and one An-26) and 4 helicopter (Mi-8) kills. Some sources show that PAF had shot down at least a dozen more aircraft during the war. However, those kills were not officially acknowledged because they took place in Afghanistan's airspace and acknowledging those kills would mean that Afghan airspace was violated by PAF. In all, Pakistan Air Force F-16s had downed 3 Su-22,1 Su-25,2 Mig-23,2 An-26, and Several Mi-8 while 1 Mig-23 was damaged while losing only one F-16 to friendly fire.

==== Terror campaign in Pakistan ====
The KhAD-KGB campaign in Pakistan was a joint campaign in which the Afghan KhAD's foreign Tenth Directorate and the Soviet KGB targeted Pakistan using prostitution spy rings, terror attacks, hijackings, serial killings, assassinations and the dissemination of propaganda to dissuade Pakistan from supporting the Afghan Mujahideen.

==== Miram Shah incident ====
On 2 April 1986, the 38th commando brigade of Democratic Republic of Afghanistan accidentally landed inside Pakistan territory during the Second Battle of Zhawar. The strike force, in the darkness of night, accidentally landed near Miram Shah in Pakistan instead of Zhawar. The force was surrounded and 120 soldiers were taken prisoner and six Mi-8 helicopters were captured.

==== Badaber uprising ====
In between 26 and 27 April 1985, in Badaber, Pakistan, an armed rebellion was instigated by Soviet and Afghan prisoners of war who were being held at the Badaber fortress near Peshawar, Pakistan. The prisoners fought the Afghan Mujahideen of the Jamiat-e Islami party and the Pakistani XI Corps supported by American CIA advisors in an attempt to escape but the rebellion was quashed and all POWs were killed.

=== Raid inside Iran ===
On 5 April 1982, Soviet forces accidentally infiltrated Iranian territory, in which Soviet forces strayed from the target of a Mujahideen base in southern Afghanistan and accidentally destroyed an asphalt factory in Iran. Iranian security forces attacked this strike force using tanks and aircraft, destroying two Soviet Mi-8 helicopters and damaging many more.

== Impact ==
=== Soviet personnel strengths and casualties ===
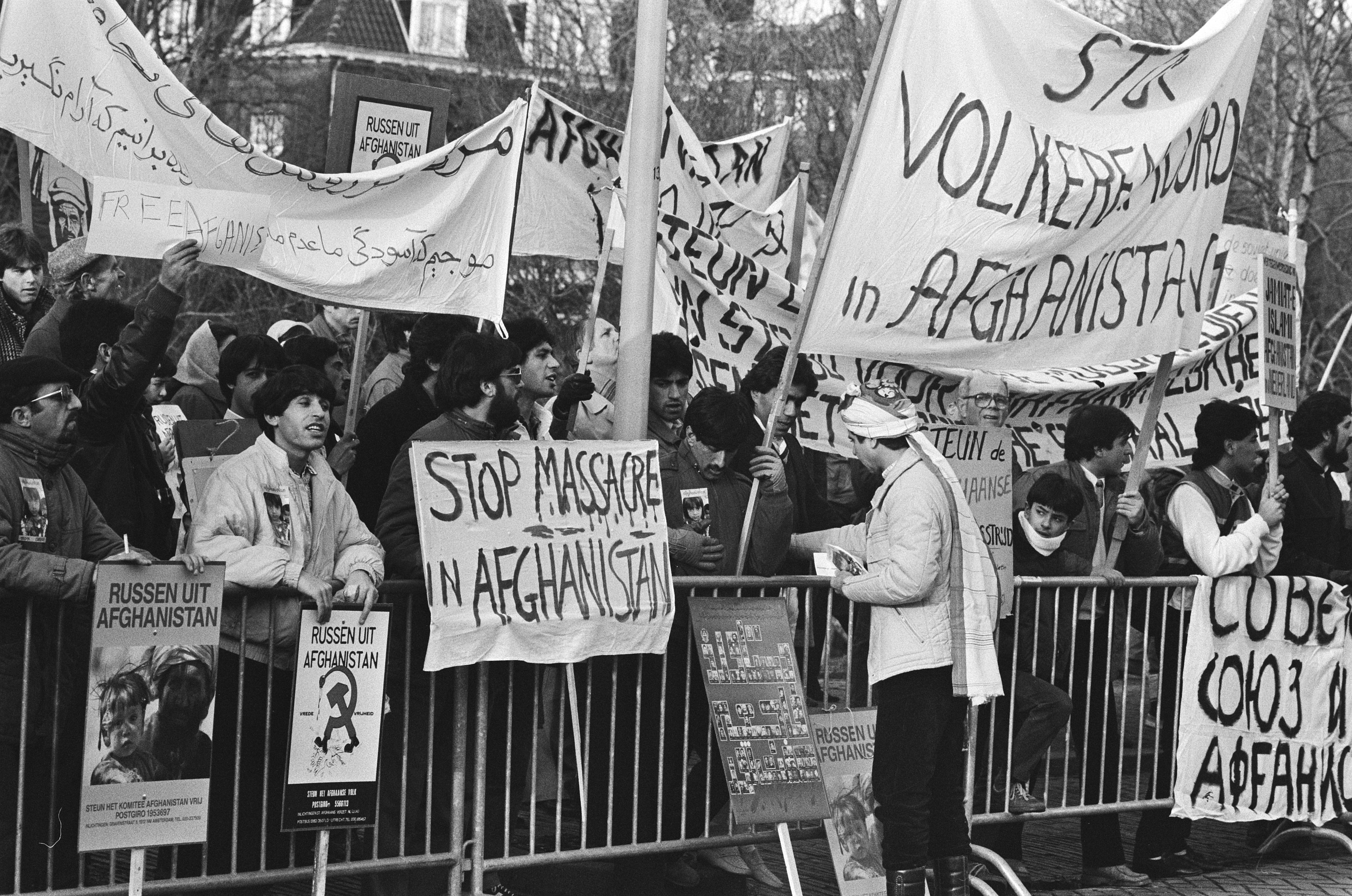
A demonstration against the Soviet presence in Afghanistan, in The Hague, Netherlands, 1985

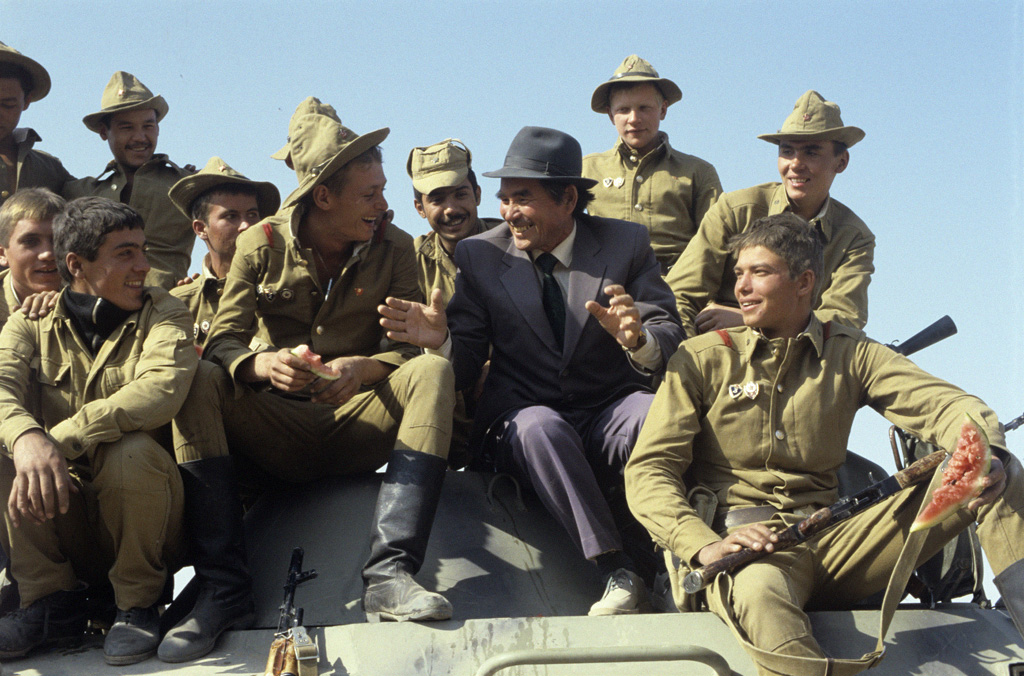
Soviet soldiers return from Afghanistan, October 1986

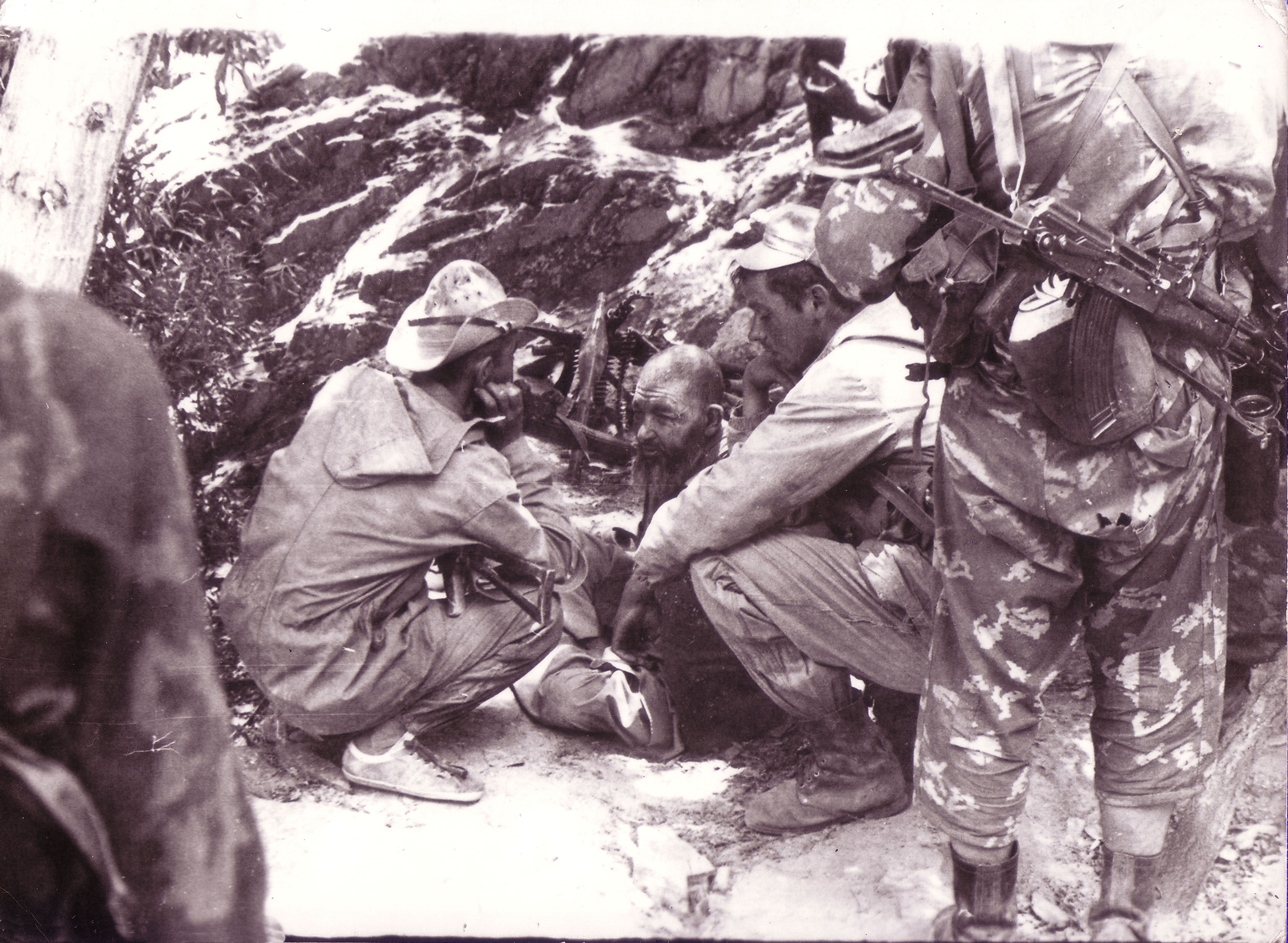
Spetsnaz troops interrogate a captured mujahideen with an RPG, rounds and AK-47 in the background, 1986

Between 25 December 1979, and 15 February 1989, 620,000 soldiers served with the forces in Afghanistan (though there were only 80,000–104,000 serving at one time): 525,000 in the Army, 90,000 with border troops and other KGB sub-units, 5,000 in formations of MVD Internal Troops, and police forces. A further 21,000 personnel were with the Soviet troop contingent over the same period doing various white collar and blue-collar jobs.

The total official fatalities of the Soviet Armed Forces, Border Troops, and Internal Troops came to 14,453. Soviet Army formations, units, and HQ elements lost 13,833, KGB sub-units lost 572, MVD formations lost 28, and other ministries and departments lost 20 men. During this period 312 servicemen were missing in action or taken prisoner; 119 were later freed, of whom 97 returned to the USSR and 22 went to other countries. In reports made by the Russian General Staff, personnel of the 40th Army killed in the war exceeded 26,000.

Of the troops deployed, 53,753 were wounded, injured, or sustained concussions and 415,932 fell sick. A high proportion of casualties were those who fell ill. This was because of local climatic and sanitary conditions, which were such that acute infections spread rapidly among the troops. There were 115,308 cases of infectious hepatitis, 31,080 of typhoid fever, and 140,665 of other diseases. Of the 11,654 who were discharged from the army after being wounded, maimed, or contracting serious diseases, 10,751 men were left disabled.

Material losses were as follows:

- 451 aircraft (includes 333 helicopters)
- 147 tanks
- 1,314 IFV/APCs
- 433 artillery guns and mortars
- 11,369 cargo and fuel tanker trucks.

In early 1987 a CIA report estimated that, from 1979 to 1986, the Soviet military spent 18 billion rubles on the war in Afghanistan (not counting other costs incurred to the Soviet state such as economic and military aid to the DRA). The CIA noted that this was the equivalent of US$50 billion ($115 billion in 2019 USD). The report credited the relatively low cost to the small size of the Soviet deployment and the fact that the supply lines to Afghanistan were very short (in some cases, easier and cheaper than internal USSR lines). Military aid to the DRA's armed forces totaled 9.124 billion rubles from 1980 to 1989 (peaking at 3.972 billion rubles in 1989). Financial and economic aid were also significant; by 1990, 75 percent of the Afghan state's income came from Soviet aid.

=== Casualties and destruction in Afghanistan ===
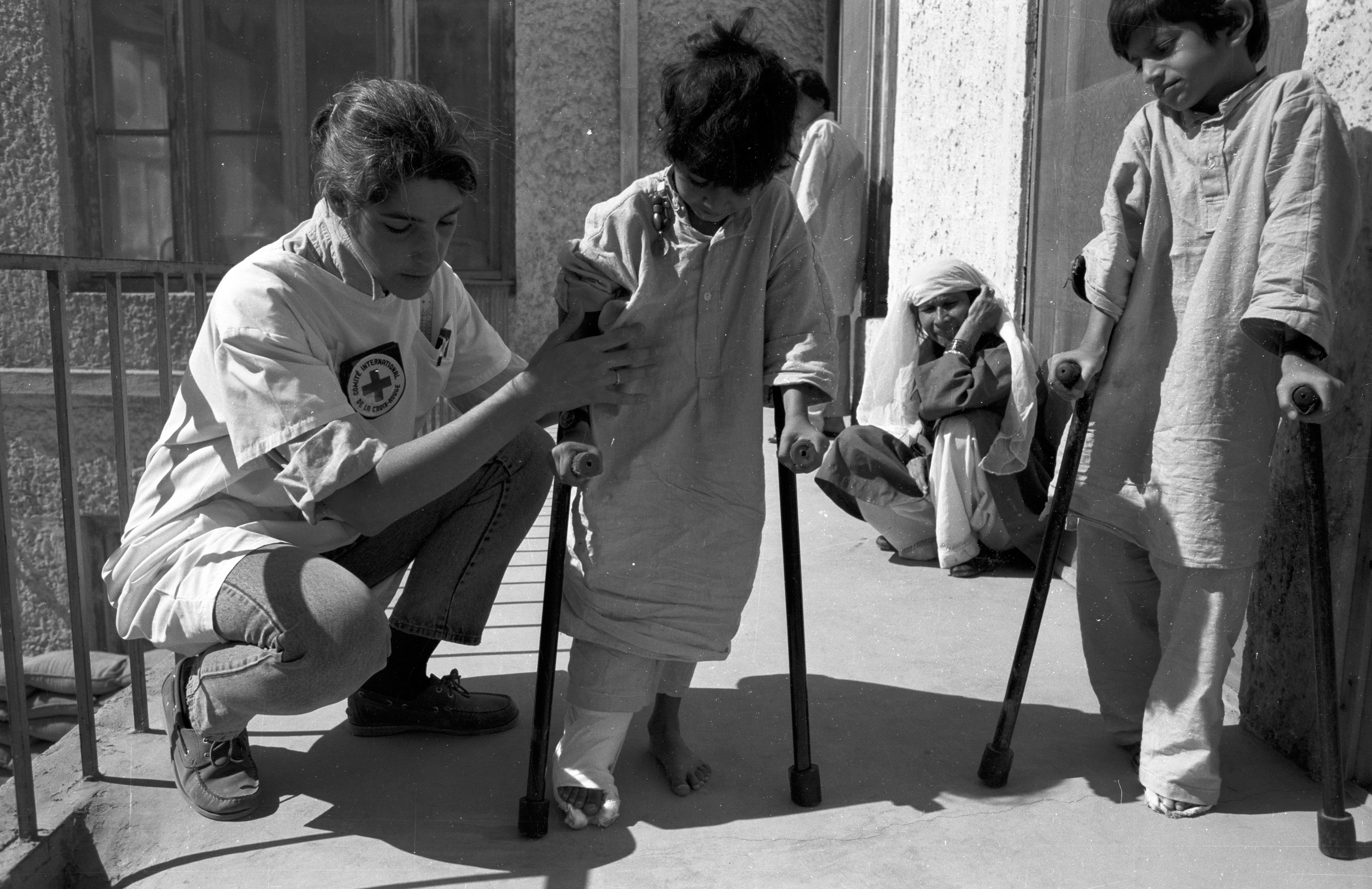
A member of the International Committee of the Red Cross helping a wounded Afghan child walk in 1986

The war resulted in the deaths of approximately 3,000,000 Afghans, civilian death and destruction from the war was massive and detrimental. Estimates of Afghan civilian deaths vary from 562,000 to 2,000,000.

Afghan mujahideen losses were also high. According to preliminary Western estimates, the resistance lost 90,000 fighters killed and the same number wounded.

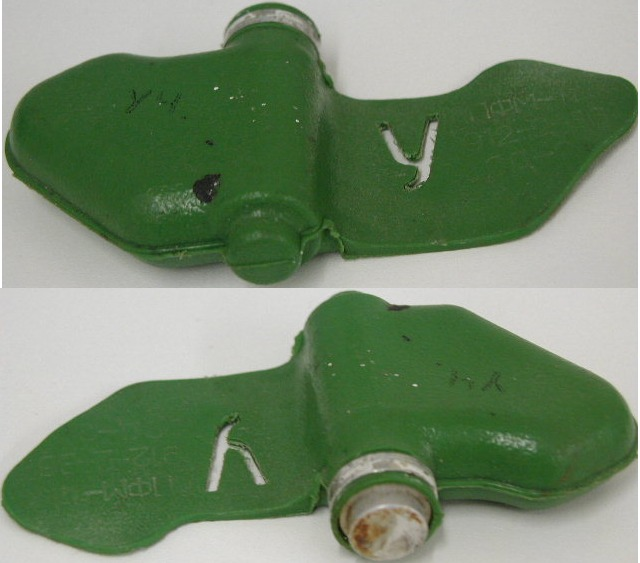
A PFM-1 mine, often mistaken for a toy by children. The mine's shape was dictated by aerodynamics.

The Geneva Accords of 1988, which ultimately led to the withdrawal of the Soviet forces in early 1989, left the Afghan government in ruins. The accords had failed to address adequately the issue of the post-occupation period and the future governance of Afghanistan. The assumption among most Western diplomats was that the Soviet-backed government in Kabul would soon collapse; however, this was not to happen for another three years. During this time the Interim Islamic Government of Afghanistan (IIGA) was established in exile. The exclusion of key groups such as refugees and Shias, combined with major disagreements between the different Mujahideen factions, meant that the IIGA never succeeded in acting as a functional government.

Before the war, Afghanistan was already one of the world's poorest countries. The prolonged conflict left Afghanistan ranked 170 out of 174 in the UNDP's Human Development Index, making Afghanistan one of the least developed countries in the world.

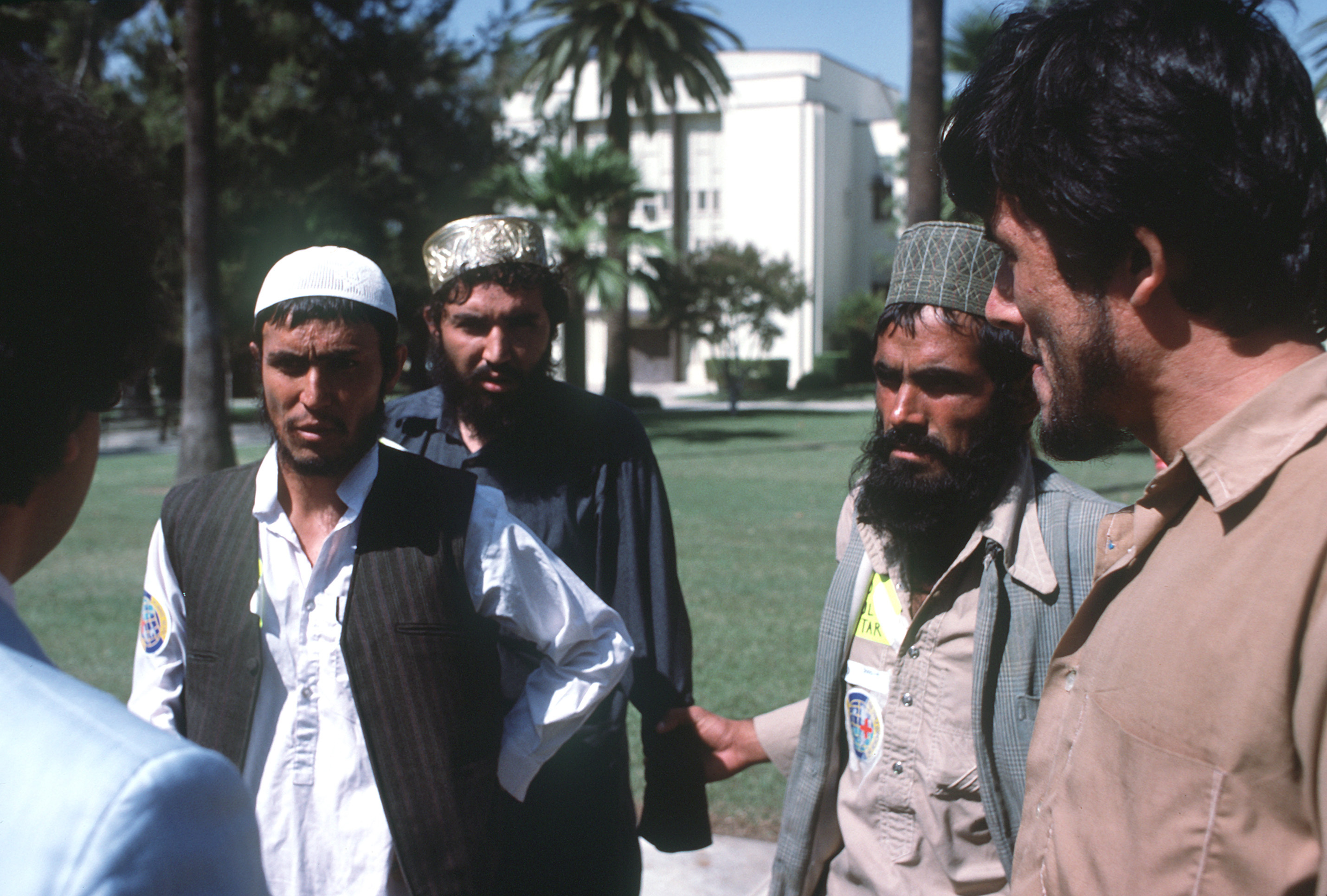
Afghan guerrillas that were chosen to receive medical treatment in the United States, Norton Air Force Base, California, 1986

Once the Soviets withdrew, US interest in Afghanistan slowly decreased over the following four years, much of it administered through the DoD Office of Humanitarian Assistance, under the then Director of HA, George M. Dykes III. With the first years of the Clinton Administration in Washington, DC, all aid ceased. The US decided not to help with reconstruction of the country, instead handing the interests of the country over to US allies Saudi Arabia and Pakistan. Pakistan quickly took advantage of this opportunity and forged relations with warlords and later the Taliban, to secure trade interests and routes. The ten years following the war saw much ecological and agrarian destruction—from wiping out the country's trees through logging practices, which has destroyed all but 2% of forest cover country-wide, to substantial uprooting of wild pistachio trees for the exportation of their roots for therapeutic uses, to opium agriculture.

Captain Tarlan Eyvazov, a soldier in the Soviet forces during the war, stated that the Afghan children's future is destined for war. Eyvazov said, "Children born in Afghanistan at the start of the war... have been brought up in war conditions, this is their way of life." Eyvazov's theory was later strengthened when the Taliban movement developed and formed from orphans or refugee children who were forced by the Soviets to flee their homes and relocate their lives in Pakistan. The swift rise to power, from the young Taliban in 1996, was the result of the disorder and civil war that had warlords running wild because of the complete breakdown of law and order in Afghanistan after the departure of the Soviets.

The CIA World Fact Book reported that as of 2004, Afghanistan still owed $8 billion in bilateral debt, mostly to Russia, however, in 2007 Russia agreed to cancel most of the debt.

=== Refugees ===
A total of 5.5 million Afghans were made refugees by the war—a full one third of the country's pre-war population—fleeing the country to Pakistan or Iran. Another estimate states 6.2 million refugees. By the end of 1981, the UN High Commission for Refugees reported that Afghans represented the largest group of refugees in the world.

Of the Afghan refugees, 3.3 million were housed in Pakistan by 1988, some of whom continue to live in the country. Of this total, about 100,000 were based in the city of Peshawar, while more than two million were located in other parts of the northwestern province of Khyber Pakhtunkhwa (then known as the North-West Frontier Province). At the same time, close to two million Afghans were living in Iran. Over the years Pakistan and Iran have imposed tighter controls on refugees which have resulted in numerous returnees. In 2012 Pakistan banned extensions of visas to foreigners. Afghan refugees have also settled in India and became Indian citizens over time. Some also made their way into North America, the European Union, Australia, and other parts of the world. The photo of Sharbat Gula placed on National Geographic cover in 1985 became a symbol both of the 1980s Afghan conflict and of the refugee situation.

Estimated number of Afghan refugees by destination, as of 1984
Pakistan	3,200,000
Iran	1,800,000
India	40,000
Europe	15,000
United States & Canada	10,000
Elsewhere	5,000

=== Effect on Afghan society ===
The legacy of the war introduced a culture of guns, drugs and terrorism in Afghanistan. The traditional power structure was also changed in favor of the powerful Mujahideen militias:

"In present-day Afghanistan the groups of clergy, community elders, intelligentsia, and the military cannot be seen."

The militarization transformed the society in the country, leading to heavily armed police, private bodyguards, and openly armed civil defense groups becoming the norm in Afghanistan both during the war and decades thereafter.

The war also altered the ethnic balance of power in the country. While Pashtuns were historically politically dominant since the modern foundation of the Durrani Empire in 1747, many of the well-organized pro-Mujahideen or pro-government groups consisted of Tajiks, Uzbeks and Hazaras. With Pashtuns increasingly politically fragmented, their influence on the state was challenged.

== Aftermath ==
Sources consistently characterize the Soviet–Afghan War as a political defeat for the Soviet Union, with some sources also defining the war as a military defeat for the Soviets. Modern literature is divided, with other sources also calling the war a political defeat for the Soviets, but a military draw.

The war and Afghanistan has typically been referred to as "Soviet Vietnam", but despite modern analogy, the result is that Afghanistan was much worse than a Soviet Vietnam, as the United States had survived Vietnam, while the Soviets did not survive Afghanistan.

== Media and popular culture ==
Within Afghanistan, war rugs were a popular form of carpet designs woven by victims of the war.

== Perception in Afghanistan ==
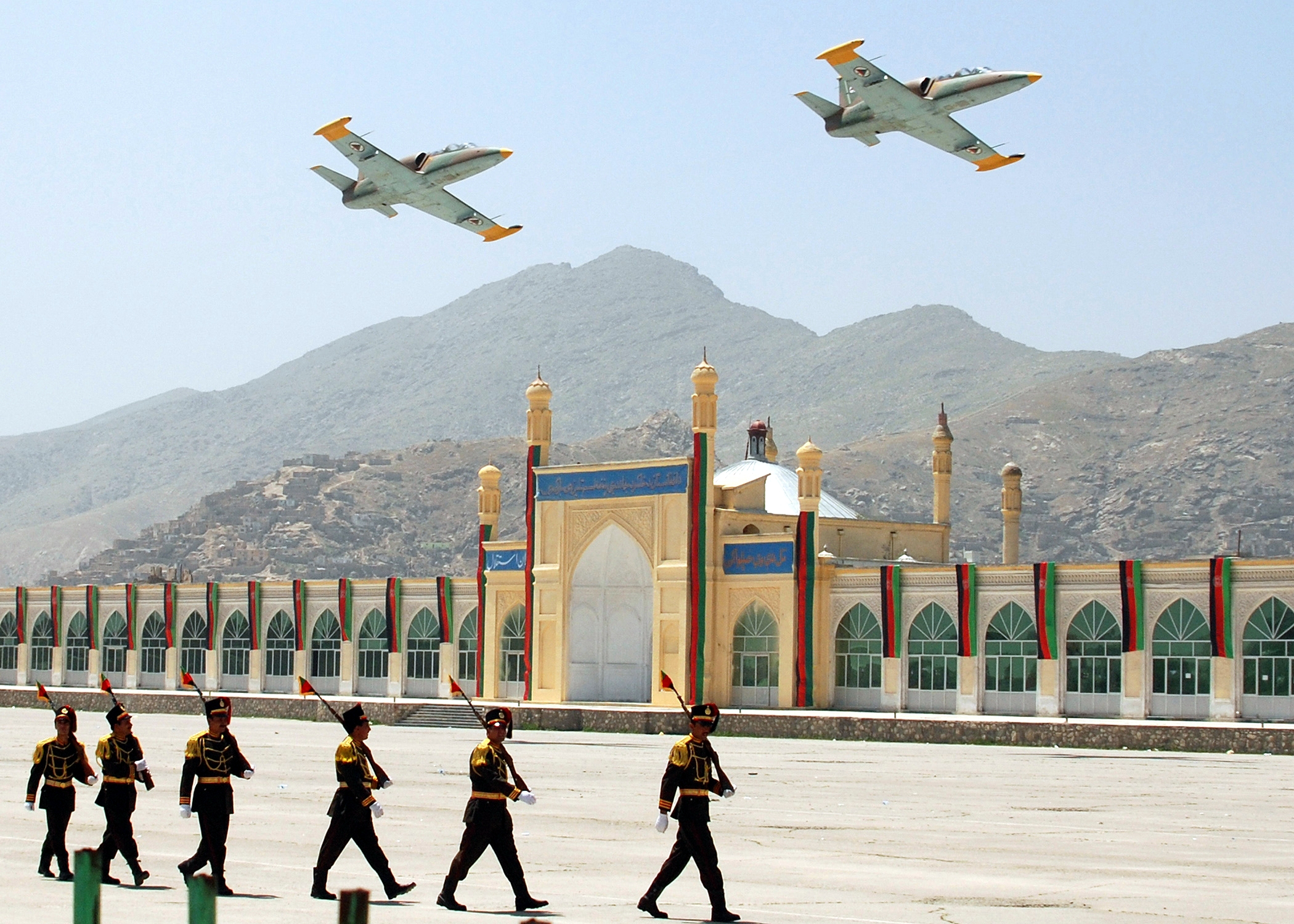
Afghans commemorating Mujahideen Victory Day in Kabul (2007)

The war has left a controversial legacy for Afghan people. Many Afghans see this as a victory over the Soviets and a source of pride. The Mujahideen Victory Day is an annual holiday in Afghanistan on 28 April, to commemorate the subsequent overthrow of the Soviet-backed regime in 1992. However, it is a controversial event to Afghans. Some Afghans honor the fighters and sacrifice made by the Mujahideen to defeat a major power, but others view the victory as a prelude to the brutal 1990s civil war that divided the country politically and ethnically.

== Perception in the former Soviet Union ==
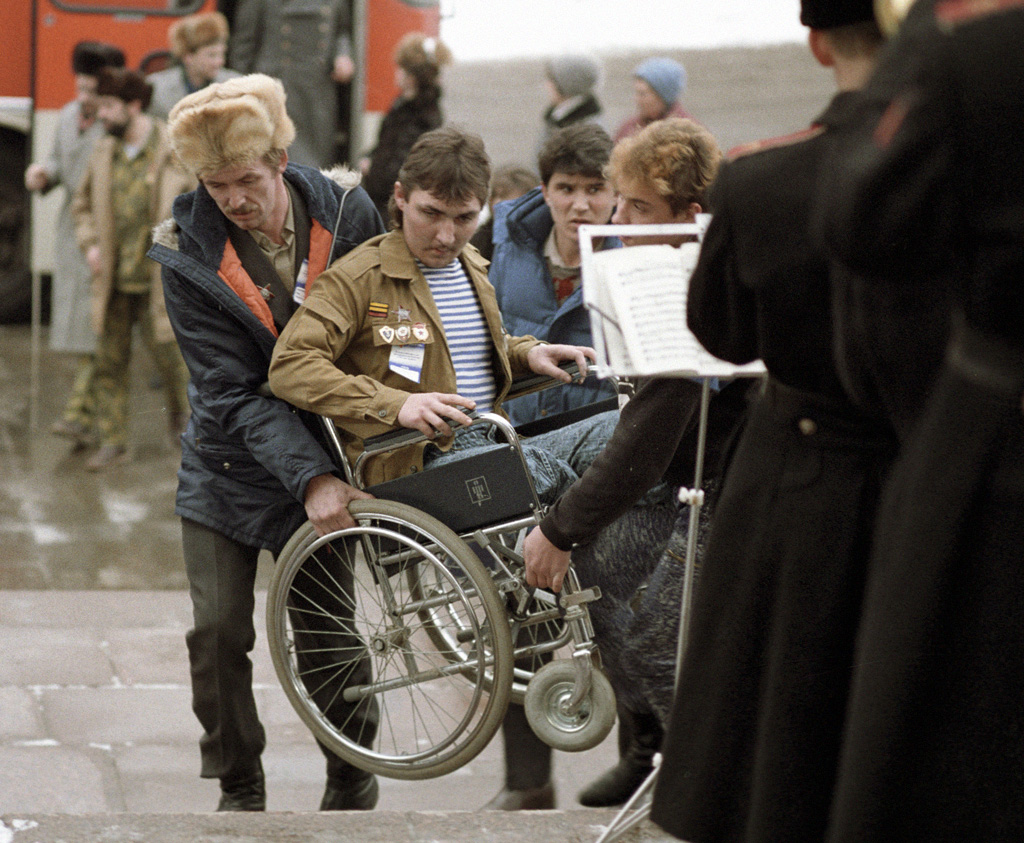
A meeting of Russian war veterans from Afghanistan, 1990

The war left a long legacy in the former Soviet Union and following its collapse. Along with losses, it brought physical disabilities and widespread drug addiction throughout the USSR.

The remembrance of Soviet soldiers killed in Afghanistan and elsewhere internationally are commemorated annually on 15 February in Russia, Ukraine and Belarus. Veterans of the war are often referred to as афганцы, Afgantsy in Russian.

== Bibliography ==
- Amstutz, J. Bruce (1994). Afghanistan: The First Five Years of Soviet Occupation. Diane Publishing. ISBN 978-0-7881-1111-2. OCLC 948347893.
- Ayub, Muhammad (2005). An Army, its Role and Rule: A History of the Pakistan Army from Independence to Kargil 1947–1999. Pittsburgh: RoseDog Books. ISBN 978-0-8059-9594-7.
- Bartrop, Paul R.; Totten, Samuel (2007). Dictionary of Genocide: A–L. ABC-CLIO. ISBN 978-0-313-34642-2. OCLC 437198304.
- Bennett, Andrew (1999). Condemned to Repetition? The Rise, Fall, and Reprise of Soviet-Russian Military Interventionism, 1973–1996. MIT Press. ISBN 978-0-262-52257-1. OCLC 40074017.
- Borovik, Artyom (1990). The Hidden War: A Russian Journalist's Account of the Soviet War in Afghanistan. New York: Grove Press. ISBN 978-0-8021-3775-3.
- Braithwaite, Rodric (2011). Afgantsy: The Russians in Afghanistan, 1979–89. New York: Oxford University Press. p. 417. ISBN 978-0-19-983265-1. LCCN 2011015052. OCLC 709682862. LCC DS371.2 .B725 2011
- Brogan, Patrick (1989). The Fighting Never Stopped: A Comprehensive Guide to World Conflicts Since 1945. Vintage Books. ISBN 978-0-679-72033-1. OCLC 319859472.
- Carew, Tom (2001). Jihad!: The Secret War in Afghanistan. Mainstream Publishing. ISBN 978-1-84018-495-2.
- Coles, T. J (2018). Manufacturing Terrorism: When Governments Use Fear to Justify Foreign Wars and Control Society. Clairview Books. ISBN 978-1-905570-97-3.
- Coll, Steve (2004). Ghost Wars: The Secret History of the CIA, Afghanistan, and Bin Laden, from the Soviet Invasion to September 10, 2001. New York: Penguin Press. ISBN 978-1-59420-007-6.
- Cormac, Rory (2018). Disrupt and Deny: Spies, Special Forces, and the Secret Pursuit of British Foreign Policy. Oxford University Press. ISBN 978-0-19-878459-3.
- Corera, Gordon (2011). MI6: Life and Death in the British Secret Service. London: Phoenix. ISBN 978-0-7538-2833-5.
- Crile, George (2003). Charlie Wilson's War: The Extraordinary Story of the Largest Covert Operation in history. New York: Atlantic Monthly Press. ISBN 978-0-87113-851-4.
- Curtis, Mark (2018). Secret Affairs: Britain's Collusion with Radical Islam. Serpent's Tail. ISBN 978-1-78283-433-5.
- Dower, John W. (2017). The Violent American Century: War and Terror Since World War II. Haymarket Books. ISBN 978-1-60846-726-6. OCLC 1038690733.
- Feifer, Gregory (2009). The Great Gamble: The Soviet war in Afghanistan. New York: Harper. ISBN 978-0-06-114318-2.
- Fenzel, Michael R. No Miracles: The Failure of Soviet Decision-Making in the Afghan War(Stanford UP, 2017) Online review of this book
- Galeotti, Mark (1995). Afghanistan: the Soviet Union's Last War. London: Frank Cass. ISBN 978-0-7146-8242-6.
- Gaol, MML; Tsvirko, Katya (24 January 2023). "Soviet Occupation in Afghanistan in the Late 20th Century". International Relations Review (Fall 2021).
- Giustozzi, Antonio (2000). War, Politics and Society in Afghanistan, 1978–1992. C. Hurst & Co. Publishers. ISBN 978-1-85065-396-7. LCCN 99017020.
- Gompert, David C.; Binnendijk, Hans; Lin, Bonny (2014). Blinders, Blunders, and Wars: What America and China Can Learn. Rand Corporation. ISBN 978-0-8330-8777-5. OCLC 904811772.
- Goodson, Larry P. (2011). Afghanistan's Endless War: State Failure, Regional Politics, and the Rise of the Taliban. University of Washington Press. ISBN 978-0-295-80158-2. OCLC 1026403863.
- Russian General Staff (2002). Grau, Lester W.; Gress, Michael A. (eds.). The Soviet-Afghan War: How a Superpower Fought and Lost. Translated by Grau, Lester W.; Gress, Michael A. Lawrence, Kansas: University Press of Kansas. ISBN 978-0-7006-1186-7. OCLC 48249312.
- Joes, Anthony James (2010). Victorious Insurgencies: Four Rebellions that Shaped Our World. The University Press of Kentucky. p. 211. ISBN 978-0-8131-2614-2.
- Jones, Adam (2006). Genocide: A Comprehensive Introduction. New York City: Routledge. ISBN 978-0-415-35385-4.
- Kakar, M. Hassan (1997). Afghanistan: The Soviet Invasion and the Afghan Response, 1979–1982. Berkeley: University of California Press. ISBN 978-0-520-08591-6. OCLC 37175170. (free online access courtesy of UCP).
- Kaplan, Robert D. (2008). Soldiers of God: With Islamic Warriors in Afghanistan and Pakistan. Knopf Doubleday Publishing Group. ISBN 978-0-307-54698-2. OCLC 48367823.
- Kepel, Gilles (2002). Jihad: The Trail of Political Islam. Harvard University Press. ISBN 978-0-674-01090-1. OCLC 685132509.
- Leake, Elisabeth (2022). Afghan Crucible: The Soviet Invasion and the Making of Modern Afghanistan. Oxford: Oxford University Press. ISBN 978-0-19-884601-7.
- Lohbeck, Kurt (1993). Holy War, Unholy Victory: Eyewitness to the CIA's Secret War in Afghanistan. Washington: Regnery Publishing. ISBN 978-0-89526-499-2.
- Maley, William & Saikal, Amin (1989). The Soviet Withdrawal from Afghanistan. Cambridge University Press. p. 127. ISBN 978-0-521-37588-7.
- Nelson, David Erik (2013). Afghanistan: Genocide & Persecution. Detroit: Greenhaven Publishing LLC. ISBN 978-0-7377-6755-1. LCCN 2012049971.
- Novinkov, Oleg (2011). Afghan boomerang. Houston, TX: Oleg Novinkov. ISBN 978-1-4392-7451-4.
- Prados, John (1996). Presidents' Secret Wars: CIA and Pentagon Covert Operations from World War II through the Persian Gulf. Chicago: I.R. Dee. ISBN 978-1-56663-108-2.
- Riedel, Bruce (2014). What We Won: America's Secret War in Afghanistan, 1979–1989. Brookings Institution Press. ISBN 978-0-8157-2595-4.
- Sareen, Sushant (2005). The Jihad Factory Pakistan's Islamic Revolution in the Making. New Delhi: Observer Research Foundation in association with Har-Anand Publications. ISBN 9788124110751. OCLC 62517115.
- Ro'i, Yaacov (2022). The Bleeding Wound: The Soviet War in Afghanistan and the Collapse of the Soviet System. Stanford University Press. ISBN 978-1-5036-3106-9.

=== Historiography and memory ===
- Galbas, Michael (2018). "'We are Heroes': The Homogenising Glorification of the Memories on the Soviet–Afghan War in Present Russia". In Daxner, Michael; Näser-Lather, Marion; Nicola, Silvia-Lucretia (eds.). Conflict Veterans: Discourses and Living Contexts of an Emerging Social Group. Newcastle upon Tyne, UK: Cambridge Scholars Publishing. pp. 134–163. ISBN 978-1-5275-2235-0.
- Gibbs, David N. (2006). "Reassessing Soviet motives for invading Afghanistan: A declassified history". Critical Asian Studies. 38 (2): 239–263. doi:10.1080/14672710600671228. ISSN 1467-2715.
- Klass, Rosanne (2018). "Genocide in Afghanistan 1978–1992". In Charny, Israel W. (ed.). The Widening Circle of Genocide: Genocide – A Critical Bibliographic Review. Routledge. ISBN 978-1-351-29406-5. OCLC 1032709528.
