= Communist (Maoist) Party of Afghanistan =

Underground communist party in Afghanistan

Communist (Maoist) Party of Afghanistan حزب کمونیست (مائوئیست) افغانستان
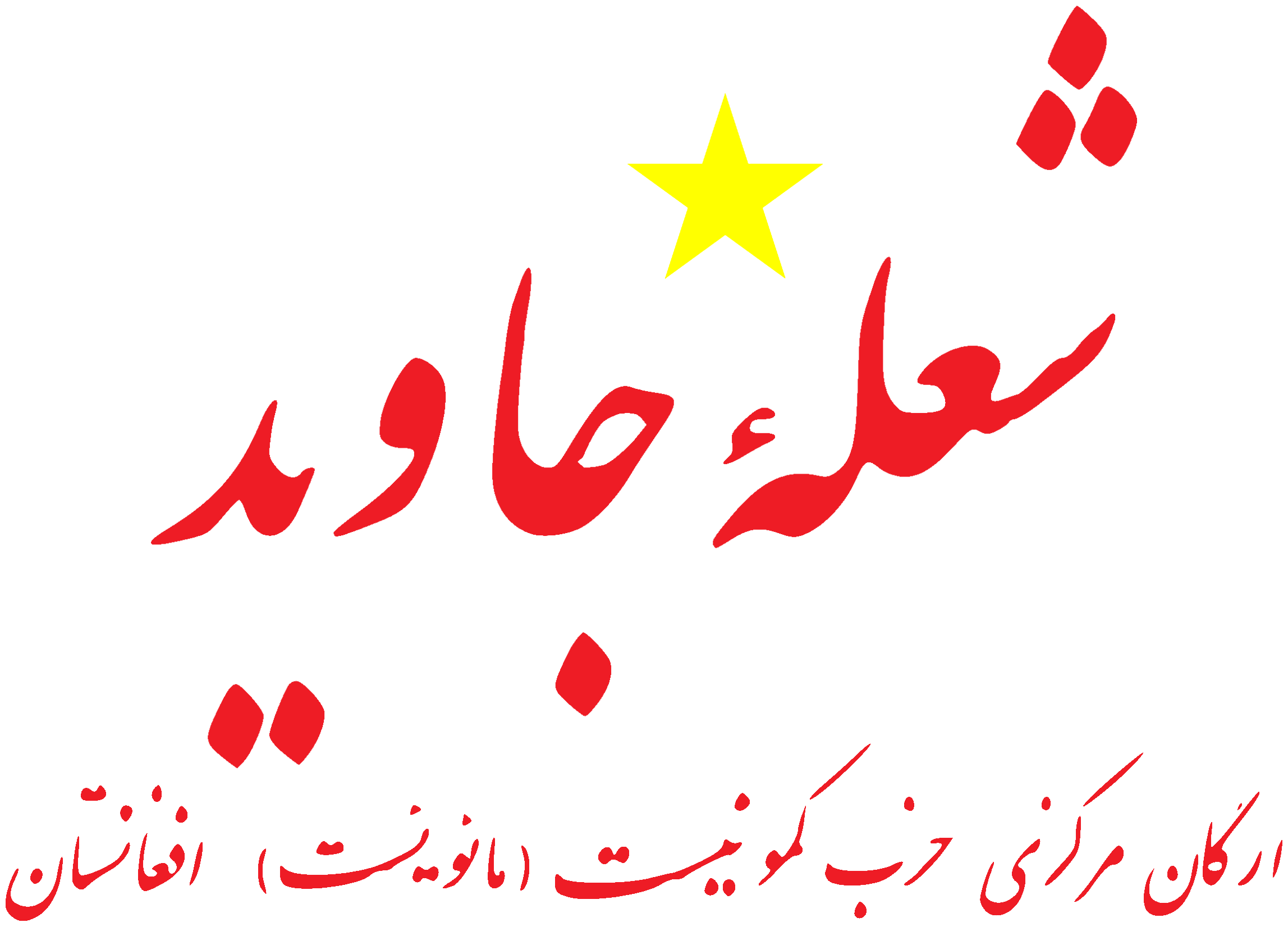
- Abbreviation: CMPA
- Founded: 2004
- Ideology: Communism; Marxism–Leninism–Maoism; Anti-imperialism
- Political position: Far-left
- International affiliation: Revolutionary Internationalist Movement (defunct)

Party flag

Website
- https://www.sholajawid.org/ https://cmpa.io/en/

The Communist (Maoist) Party of Afghanistan (Dari: حزب کمونیست (مائوئیست) افغانستان, Hizb-i Komunist (Ma'uist) Afğānistān), previously known as the Communist Party of Afghanistan, is an underground Marxism–Leninism–Maoist political organisation in Afghanistan. The party was founded in 2004 through the merger of five other Maoist parties. It was a member of the Revolutionary Internationalist Movement (RIM).

During the U.S.-led occupation of Afghanistan from 2001 to 2021, the party's stated goal was to start a people's war in order to expel foreign forces from Afghanistan, with the ultimate goal of establishing a New Democratic society and socialism in the country. After the withdrawal of U.S.-led forces from Afghanistan and the establishment of the Islamic Emirate of Afghanistan by the Taliban in mid-2021, the party changed its primary goal to overthrowing the Taliban's government.

== History ==
The first communist organization in Afghanistan, Progressive Youth Organization (PYO) was formed in 1965. There were daily demonstrations, and street fighting between students, workers, and social justice activists and police and armed forces of King Zahir Shah. These struggles led to the formation of the PYO. A few circles of intellectuals and political activists came together to form the first communist organization to work for the goal of revolution in Afghanistan. Akram Yari, a Maoist, was the leader of one these circles, who played a prominent role in the formation of PYO.

PYO remained an underground organization. The PYO leaders published a magazine called Shola-ye Jawid. Shola-ye Jawid claimed to be a new-democratic journal, which was widely and openly circulated. After publishing 11 issues, Shola-ye Jawid was seized by government and its publication banned. The government of the time used law enforcement and Islamic fundamentalists against Shola-ye Jawid supporters. These government tactics led to physical confrontation between those who supported the Maoists and those who were against the Maoists, that resulted to the death of a prominent Maoist student leader Saydal Sokhandan, who was assassinated by Gulbuddin Hekmatyar on the Kabul University campus. Gulbadin Hekmatyar later became the leader of the Islamic Party of Afghanistan, who has been a key ally of the United States in the past.

When the People's Democratic Party of Afghanistan (PDPA) came to power in a military coup in 1978, the PDPA regime declared their number one enemy to be the PYO-led Maoist movement. All people belonging to the Maoist movement were arrested and killed indiscriminately. Thousands of Maoists and their allies were killed. The leaderless remnants of the Maoist movement formed several organizations to fight the PDPA regime and resist the Soviet invasion of Afghanistan. During this period, some communist groups became more closely aligned with Islamic mujahideen groups of a type they had previously opposed.

The hardline Maoist organisations detached themselves from those who cooperated with the mujahideen, and in the late 1980s these groups formed the Revolutionary Communist Cell of Afghanistan (RCCA). The RCCA along with others formed the Revolutionary Communist Organization of Afghanistan (RCOA), which in 1991 proclaimed the establishment of the Communist Party of Afghanistan (CPA). The CPA renewed publication of Shola-ye Jawid, stating their intent to follow in the footsteps of the PYO and its founder Akram Yari.

Following the 2001 invasion of Afghanistan, the CPA called on the Maoist organizations to unite in a single, united Maoist party. For that purpose the CPA with four other Maoist organizations formed the Unity Committee of Marxist-Leninist-Maoist Movement of Afghanistan. The Unity Committee after three years of ideological and political struggle went for the Unity Congress of the Communist (MLM) Movement. The Unity Congress was concluded on 1 May 2004 and the Communist (Maoist) Party of Afghanistan was formed.

The C(M)PA is a clandestine organization.
