= 1979 uprisings in Afghanistan =

Anti-government unrest before the Soviet–Afghan War

- Part of the Cold War in Asia
Date	15 March – 25 December 1979
Location	Afghanistan
Result	Afghan Government victory; Most uprisings suppressed; Soviets intervene and overthrow the Khalq Government; Soviet Invasion of Afghanistan

Belligerents
Democratic Republic of Afghanistan	Jamiat-e Islami; Afghanistan Liberation Organization; SAMA; Shura-e-ittifaqi; Iran

Commanders and leaders
(Afghanistan) Nur Muhammad Taraki X; (Afghanistan) Hafizullah Amin X	Ismail Khan; Faiz Ahmad; Majid Kalakani; Sayyid Ali Beheshti

The 1979 uprisings in Afghanistan were a series of uprisings against the PDPA-Khalq government of Afghanistan by various Maoist, Islamist and minority groups. These uprisings were supported by many foreign nations such as Iran's new Islamic republic, the United States and Pakistan and were subsequently crushed by the Afghan Army. Many Islamist groups which had been training in exile to overthrow the previous President Daoud Khan saw the opportunity to start a Jihad against the PDPA government. The uprisings would eventually culminate into the Soviet-Afghan War and following civil Wars.

List of uprisings:

- 1979 Herat uprising
- 1979 Hazara Uprising
- Chindawol uprising
- Bala Hissar uprising

== See also ==
- Operation Cyclone
