= People's war =

Maoist military strategy

- Simplified Chinese: 人民战争
- Traditional Chinese: 人民戰爭
Transcriptions
Standard Mandarin
- Hanyu Pinyin: rénmín zhànzhēng
- Wade–Giles: Jenmin chancheng
other Mandarin
- Xiao'erjing: ژٌ مٍ جً ﺟْﻊ
Yue: Cantonese
- Yale Romanization: Jànman zíncàang

People's war or protracted people's war is a Maoist military strategy. First developed by the Chinese communist revolutionary leader Mao Zedong (1893–1976), the basic concept behind people's war is to maintain the support of the population and draw the enemy deep into the countryside (stretching their supply lines) where the population will bleed them dry through guerrilla warfare and eventually build up to mobile warfare. It was used by the Chinese communists against the Imperial Japanese Army in the Second Sino-Japanese War, and by the Chinese Soviet Republic in the Chinese Civil War.

The term is used by Maoists for their strategy of long-term armed revolutionary struggle. After the Sino-Vietnamese War in 1979, Deng Xiaoping abandoned people's war for "People's War under Modern Conditions", which moved away from reliance on troops over technology. With the adoption of "socialism with Chinese characteristics", economic reforms fueled military and technological investment. Troop numbers were also reduced and professionalisation encouraged.

The strategy of people's war was used heavily by the Viet Cong in the Vietnam War. However, protracted war should not be confused with the "foco" theory employed by Che Guevara and Fidel Castro in the Cuban Revolution of 1959.

== Overview ==
=== In China ===
Simplified guerrilla warfare organization

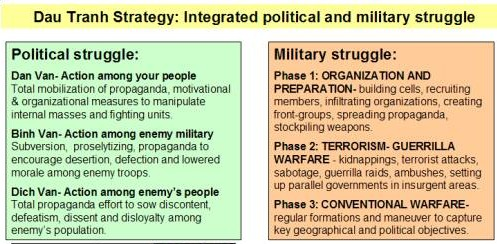
The classic "3-phase" Maoist model as adapted by North Vietnam's Ho Chi Minh and Võ Nguyên Giáp.

In its original formulation by Chairman of the Chinese Communist Party Mao Zedong, people's war exploits the few advantages that a small revolutionary movement has—broad-based popular support can be one of them—against a state's power with a large, professional, well-equipped and well-funded army. People's war strategically avoids decisive battles, since a tiny force of a few dozen soldiers would easily be routed in an all-out confrontation with the state. Instead, it favours a three-phase strategy of protracted warfare, with carefully chosen battles that can realistically be won.

In phase one, the revolutionary force conducting people's war starts in a remote area with mountainous or forested terrain in which its enemy is weak. It attempts to establish a local stronghold known as a revolutionary base area. As it grows in power, it enters phase two, establishes other revolutionary base areas and spreads its influence through the surrounding countryside, where it may become the governing power and gain popular support through such programmes as land reform. Eventually in phase three, the movement has enough strength to encircle and capture small cities, then larger ones, until finally it seizes power in the entire country.

Within the Chinese Red Army, the concept of people's war was the basis of strategy against the Japanese, and against a hypothetical Soviet invasion of China. The concept of people's war became less important with the collapse of the Soviet Union and the increasing possibility of conflict with the United States over Taiwan. In the 1980s and 1990s the concept of people's war was changed to include more high-technology weaponry. Historian David Priestland dates the beginning of the policy of people's war to the publication of a "General Outline for Military Work" in May 1928, by Chinese Central Committee. This document established official military strategies to the Chinese Red Army during the Chinese Civil War.

The strategy of people's war has political dimensions in addition to its military dimensions. In China, the early People's Liberation Army was composed of peasants who had previously lacked political significance and control over their place in the social order. Its internal organization was egalitarian between soldiers and officers, and its external relationship with rural civilians was egalitarian. Military success against an adversaries with major material advantages (in Mao's experience, the Nationalist forces and the invading Japanese army), required weakening the adversary through attrition and strengthening one's own forces through accumulation, a method which could only succeed if the guerilla army had the people's support. As sociologist Alessandro Russo summarizes, the political existence of peasants via the PLA was a radical exception to the rules of Chinese society and "overturned the strict traditional hierarchies in unprecedented forms of egalitarianism."

==== Other usage in Chinese rhetoric ====
In China, the generalized use of military terminology to other aspects of society is influenced by factors including the use of military terms in political struggles and media as well as the longstanding respect for the People's Liberation Army.

Chen Boda's 1960 strategy of "electrocentrism", through which the electronics industry should develop technological advancements and become embedded at all levels of China's economy, incorporated the philosophy of fighting a people's war to "smash electronic mysticism" and rapidly develop in the age of electronics. This included small-scale enterprises (not just large enterprises) producing electronics to spur development.

In 2014 Party leadership in Xinjiang commenced a People's War against the “Three Evil Forces” of separatism, terrorism, and extremism. They deployed two hundred thousand party cadres to Xinjiang and launched the Civil Servant-Family Pair Up program. Xi was dissatisfied with the initial results of the People's War and replaced Zhang Chunxian with Chen Quanguo in 2016. Following his appointment Chen oversaw the recruitment of tens of thousands of additional police officers and the division of society into three categories: trustworthy, average, untrustworthy. He instructed his subordinated to "Take this crackdown as the top project," and "to preempt the enemy, to strike at the outset." Following a meeting with Xi in Beijing Chen Quanguo held a rally in Ürümqi with ten thousand troops, helicopters, and armored vehicles. As they paraded he announced a “smashing, obliterating offensive,” and declared that they would "bury the corpses of terrorists and terror gangs in the vast sea of the People's War."

In February 2020, the Chinese Communist Party launched an aggressive campaign described by General Secretary of the Chinese Communist Party Xi Jinping as a "people's war" to contain the spread of the coronavirus.

=== Outside China ===
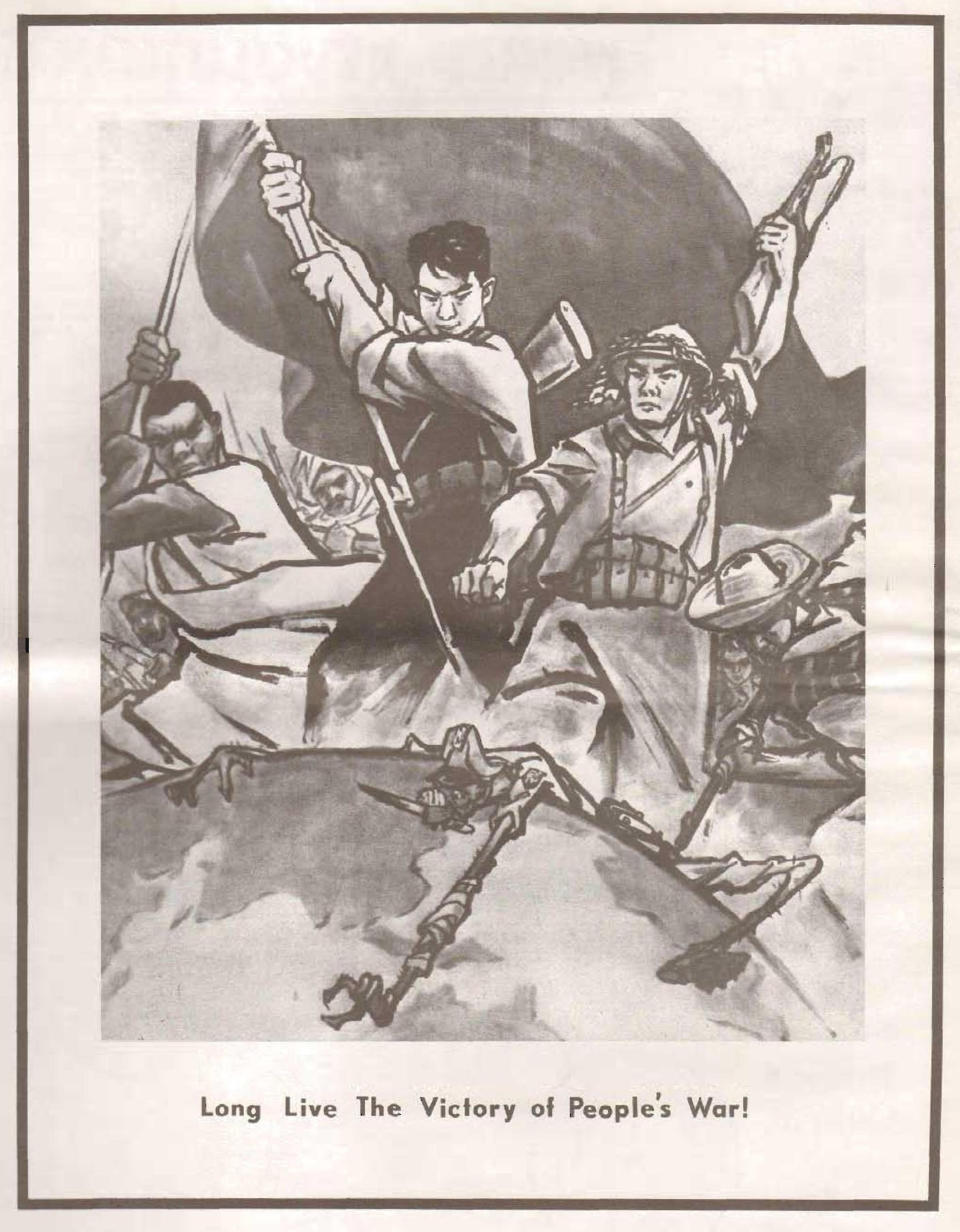
"Long Live The Victory of People's War!" poster in Seize The Time, an American Maoist publication, 1974.

Mao's doctrine of people's war influenced various Third World revolutionary movements including the Naxalites and the Shining Path.

From 1965 to 1971, China held yearly military training for Palestinian fedayeen, including instruction in Mao Zedong Thought on guerilla warfare and people's war.

From 1966 to 1970, Syria was indirectly ruled by the neo-Ba'athist and totalitarian regime of General Salah Jadid, which actively promoted the ideas of Marxism–Leninism and the Maoist concept of People's War against Zionism, which was expressed in its huge support for communist and socialist Palestinian fedayeen groups, granting them considerable autonomy and allowing them to carry out attacks on Israel from Syrian territory. Just a few months after the coming to power, Jadid's regime completed the formation of the Palestinian paramilitary Ba'athist group called al-Sa'iqa, which carried out attacks on Israel from Jordanian and Lebanese territory, but was completely under the control of the neo-Ba'athist regime in Syria.

Mao-era China contended that the Arab defeat in the Six-Day War demonstrated that only people's war, not other strategies or methods, could defeat imperialism in the Middle East.

The Popular Front for the Liberation of the Occupied Arabian Gulf's (PFLOAG) goal was to use people's war to establish a socialist Arab state in the Gulf region.

In Iran, the Islamic Revolutionary Guard Corps used the protracted people's war against Ba'athist Iraq during the Iran-Iraq war.

== List of people's wars ==
Conflicts in the following list are failed and successful wars labelled as people's wars by Maoists, and also both failed and ongoing attempts to start and develop people's wars. In addition to the conflicts in the list, there also have been conflicts not primarily led by Maoists or seen as people's wars, but had Maoist groups involved within them who viewed the conflicts partly as such, including the Democratic Front for the Liberation of Palestine (Arab–Israeli conflict) and the Communist Party of Burma (Myanmar civil war).

Date	Conflict	State	Rebel group	Revolutionary base area	Deaths	Result
1 August 1927 – 7 December 1949	Chinese Civil War	China	Chinese Communist Party: Chinese Workers' and Peasants' Red Army (1927–1937); People's Liberation Army (1946–1950)	Communist-controlled China	13 million+ killed	Communist victory
2 April 1948 – 21 September 1988	Communist insurgency in Myanmar	Burma	Communist Party of Burma: People's Liberation Army	Shan State	3,000+ killed	Government victory
1 November 1955 – 30 April 1975	Vietnam War	South Vietnam	Viet Cong: People's Liberation Armed Forces of South Vietnam	War zone C (1966–72); Lộc Ninh (1972–75)	1,326,494–4,249,494 killed	Communist victory
23 May 1959 – 2 December 1975	Laotian Civil War	Laos	Lao People's Party: Pathet Lao	Xam Neua	20,000–62,000 killed	Communist victory
1961 – 1979	Nicaraguan Revolution	Nicaragua	Sandinistas: Sandinista Popular Army	North Caribbean Coast Autonomous Region	30,000+ killed	Communist victory
c. December 1962 – 3 November 1990	Communist insurgency in Sarawak	Malaysia	North Kalimantan Communist Party: North Kalimantan People's Army	Sarawak	400–500 killed	Government victory
1965 – 1983	Communist insurgency in Thailand	Thailand	Communist Party of Thailand: People's Liberation Army of Thailand	Nakhon Phanom Province	6,500+ killed	Government victory
18 May 1967 – present	Naxalite–Maoist insurgency	India	Communist Party of India (Maoist): People's Liberation Guerrilla Army	Red corridor	14,000+ killed since 1996	Ongoing
17 January 1968 – 17 April 1975	Cambodian Civil War	Khmer Republic	Communist Party of Kampuchea: Khmer Rouge	Ratanakiri Province	275,000–310,000 killed	Communist victory
29 March 1969 – present	Communist rebellion in the Philippines	Philippines	Communist Party of the Philippines: New People's Army	Samar	40,000+ killed	Ongoing
12 September 1972 – present	Maoist insurgency in Turkey	Turkey	Communist Party of Turkey/Marxist–Leninist: Liberation Army of the Workers and Peasants of Turkey; Maoist Communist Party: People's Liberation Army	Tunceli Province		Ongoing
1972 – 1974	Araguaia Guerrilla War	Brazil	Communist Party of Brazil: Araguaia Guerrilla Force	State of Goiás	90+ Maoists killed	Government victory, failed to develop a people's war
1976 – 1996	GRAPO insurgency	Spain	Communist Party of Spain (Reconstituted): First of October Anti-Fascist Resistance Groups		84+ killed	Government victory, failed to develop a people's war
1977 – present	Maoist insurgency in Afghanistan (including the Soviet–Afghan War and the anti-Taliban insurgency)	Afghanistan	Liberation Organization of the People of Afghanistan; Afghanistan Liberation Organization; Communist (Maoist) Party of Afghanistan		120+ Maoists killed (only the ALO)	Ongoing
17 May 1980 – Ongoing	Internal conflict in Peru	Peru	Communist Party of Peru–Shining Path: People's Guerilla Army	Ayacucho Region	70,000+ killed	Shining Path declines, but continues insurgency
6 February 1981 – 26 January 1986	Ugandan Bush War	Uganda	Uganda Patriotic Movement/National Resistance Movement (1981–1986): Popular Resistance Army (1981); National Resistance Army (1981–1986)	Luwero Triangle	100,000–500,000 killed	NRM victory
25 January 1982	Amol uprising	Iran	Union of Iranian Communists (Sarbedaran)	Amol County	300+ killed	Government victory, failed to develop a people's war
1 June 1993 – present	Maoist insurgency in Ecuador	Ecuador	Communist Party of Ecuador – Red Sun	Chimborazo Province		Ongoing
1993 – 2022	Maoist insurgency in Bangladesh	Bangladesh	Purbo Banglar Communist Party; Purba Banglar Sarbahara Party	Khulna	1,200+ killed	Government victory
13 February 1996 – 21 November 2006	Nepalese Civil War	Nepal	Communist Party of Nepal (Maoist): People's Liberation Army, Nepal	Rapti Zone	17,800+ killed	Communist victory
2008 – present	Maoist insurgency in Bhutan	Bhutan	Communist Party of Bhutan (Marxist–Leninist–Maoist): Bhutan Tiger Force	Sarpang District		Ongoing

== See also ==
- On Protracted War
- Attrition warfare
- Soviet partisans
- Viet Cong and PAVN strategy, organization and structure
- Strategy and tactics of guerrilla warfare
- Colombian conflict (1964–present)
- Paraguayan People's Army insurgency
