= Bala Hissar uprising =

1979 insurrection attempt in Kabul, Afghanistan

- Part of the 1979 uprisings in Afghanistan
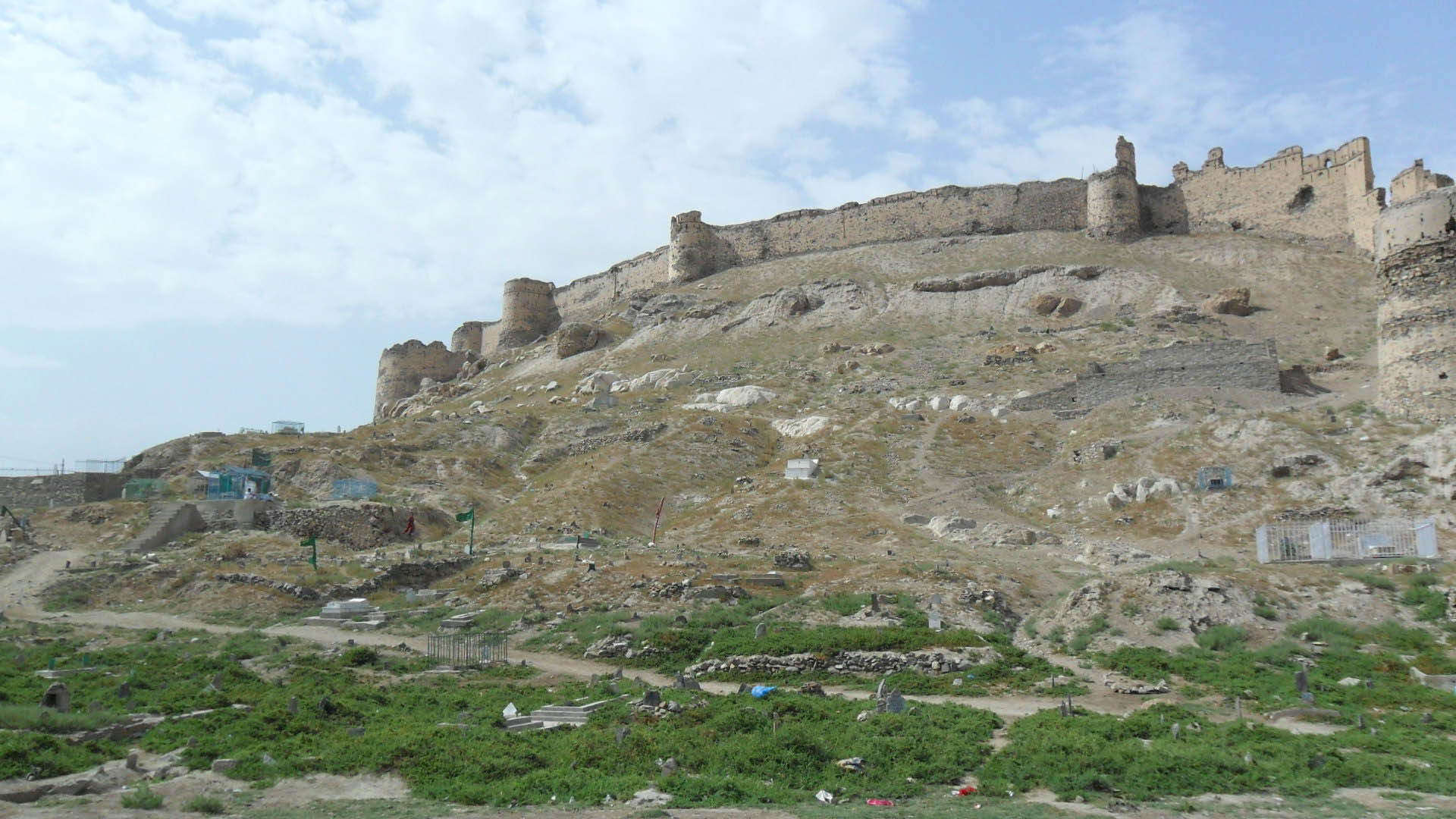
- Bala Hissar in 2010
Date	5 August 1979
Location	Kabul, Afghanistan
Result	Afghan Government victory: Uprising put down; Maoist rebels arrested, some executed

Belligerents
Afghanistan	Afghanistan Mujahideen Freedom Fighters Front; ALO; SAMA; Afghan Army maoist defectors

Commanders and leaders
Nur Muhammad Taraki; Hafizullah Amin	Faiz Ahmad; Mulavi Dawood

Units involved
Afghan Army; Afghan Air Force; Ministry of Interior; AGSA; 4 battalions	ANA defectors; ACF defectors; 444th Commando Battalion defectors; 26th Airborne Regiment defectors; 32 Motorized Infantry Regiment defectors

Strength
Unknown	AMFF: 1,500

Casualties and losses
Unknown	400–1,000 killed

The Bala Hissar uprising was an insurrection that took place on August 5, 1979, at the historical fortress Bala Hissar on the southern edge of Kabul, Afghanistan. Insurgents, as well as rebellious Afghan Army, officers infiltrated and occupied the fortress. They were met by ruthless air bombardment by the Khalq government's MiG aircraft and artillery tank attacks.

The uprising was commanded by Faiz Ahmad of the Marxist (but anti-Khalq) Revolutionary Group of the Peoples of Afghanistan (RGPA) and engineered by the Afghanistan Mujahedin Freedom Fighters Front (AMFF), a united front of anti-government Maoist and moderate Islamist groups. It was planned to be the first in a string of insurrections at major army garrisons and bases, the objective being to deal a military and political blow to the ruling PDPA/Khalq government and pave the way for a military coup.

After the five hour battle, tens of Maoist cadres were killed or arrested, and the government swiftly wrested back control of the fort. Some RGPA central committee members like Mohammad Mohsin, Mohammad Dawod and others were executed in the Pul-e-Charkhi prison. Government trucks with mounted loudspeakers drove around Kabul announcing that the military action was retaliation of another international imperialist plot against the "people's regime".

Except from the Herat uprising, the Bala Hissar rebellion was the most significant of the many uprisings that took place throughout Afghanistan in 1979 before the start of the Soviet-Afghan War.
