= 1979 Herat uprising =

Failed insurrection in Afghanistan

- Part of the 1979 uprisings in Afghanistan
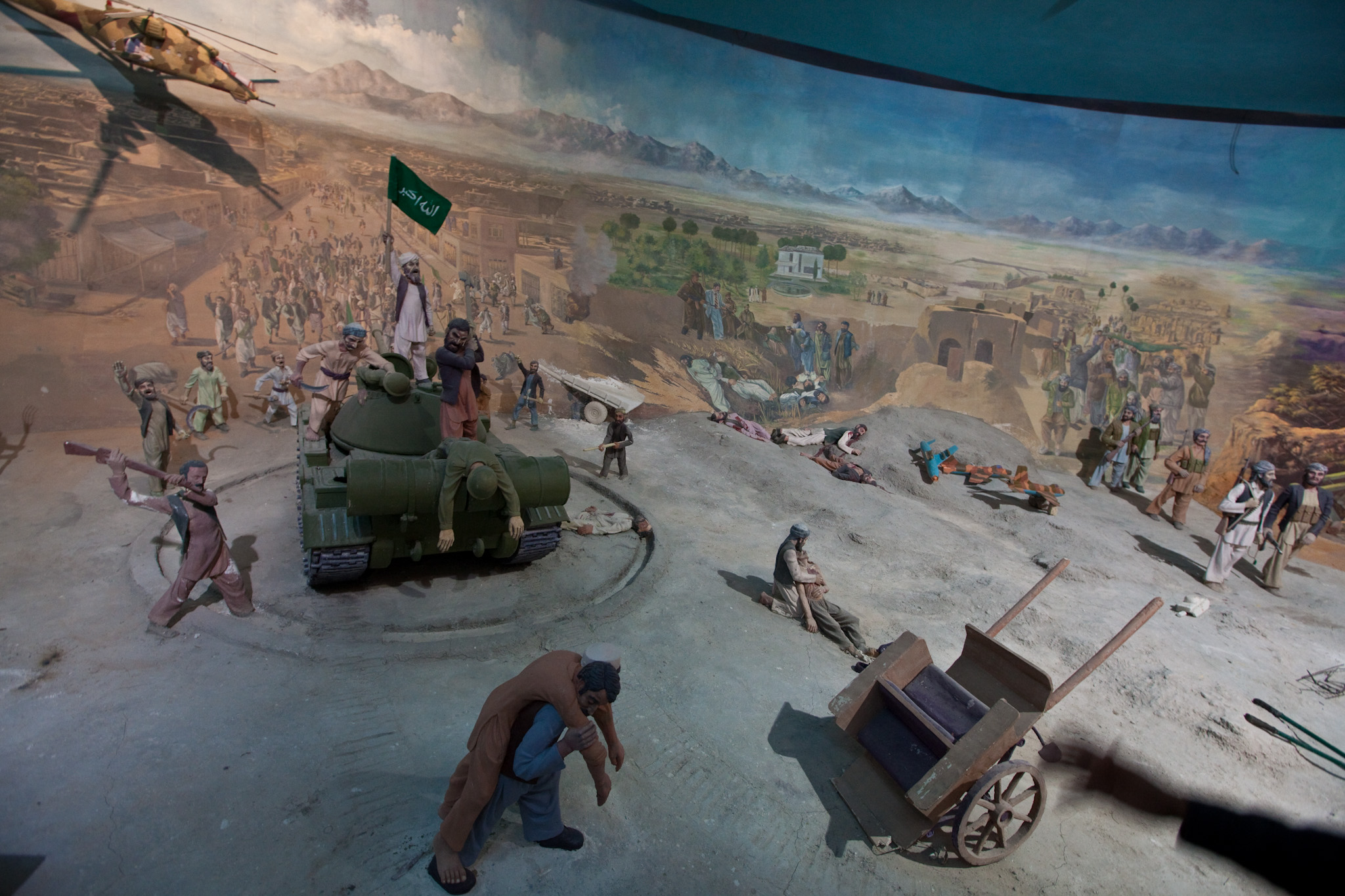
- A diorama depicting the insurgency in Herat Military Museum.
Date	15–20 March 1979 (5 days)
Location	Herat Province, Democratic Republic of Afghanistan
Result	Afghan government victory: Uprising suppressed; Soviet Union increases military assistance to Afghan government; The Democratic Republic of Afghanistan regains control of Herat city and Herat Province

Belligerents
Afghanistan	Jamiat-e Islami; ALO; LOPA; Iran

Commanders and leaders
Nur Muhammad Taraki; Hafizullah Amin; Shahnawaz Tanai; Maj. Gen. Sayyed Mukharam	Ismail Khan; Sardar Jagran; Rasul Baloch; Alauddin Khan; Kamar-i Dozd; Shir Aga Shongar; Mohammed Anwar; Shamshir Khan; Haji Qasim; Mohammed Omar; Major Dawoodkhel

Units involved
Afghan Armed Forces; Afghan Army; Afghan Commando Forces; 466th Commando Battalion; 4th Armoured Brigade; 15th Armoured Brigade; 5th Heavy Artillery Regiment; 20th Infantry Regiment; Afghan Air Force; 355th Fighter-Bomber Aviation Regiment	17th Division; 177th Air Defence Company; 70th Infantry Regiment; 11th Heavy Artillery Regiment

Strength
Afghanistan: 300+	Jamiat-e Islami: 20,000; Iran: 5,000+

Casualties and losses
- 2,000+ civilians dead

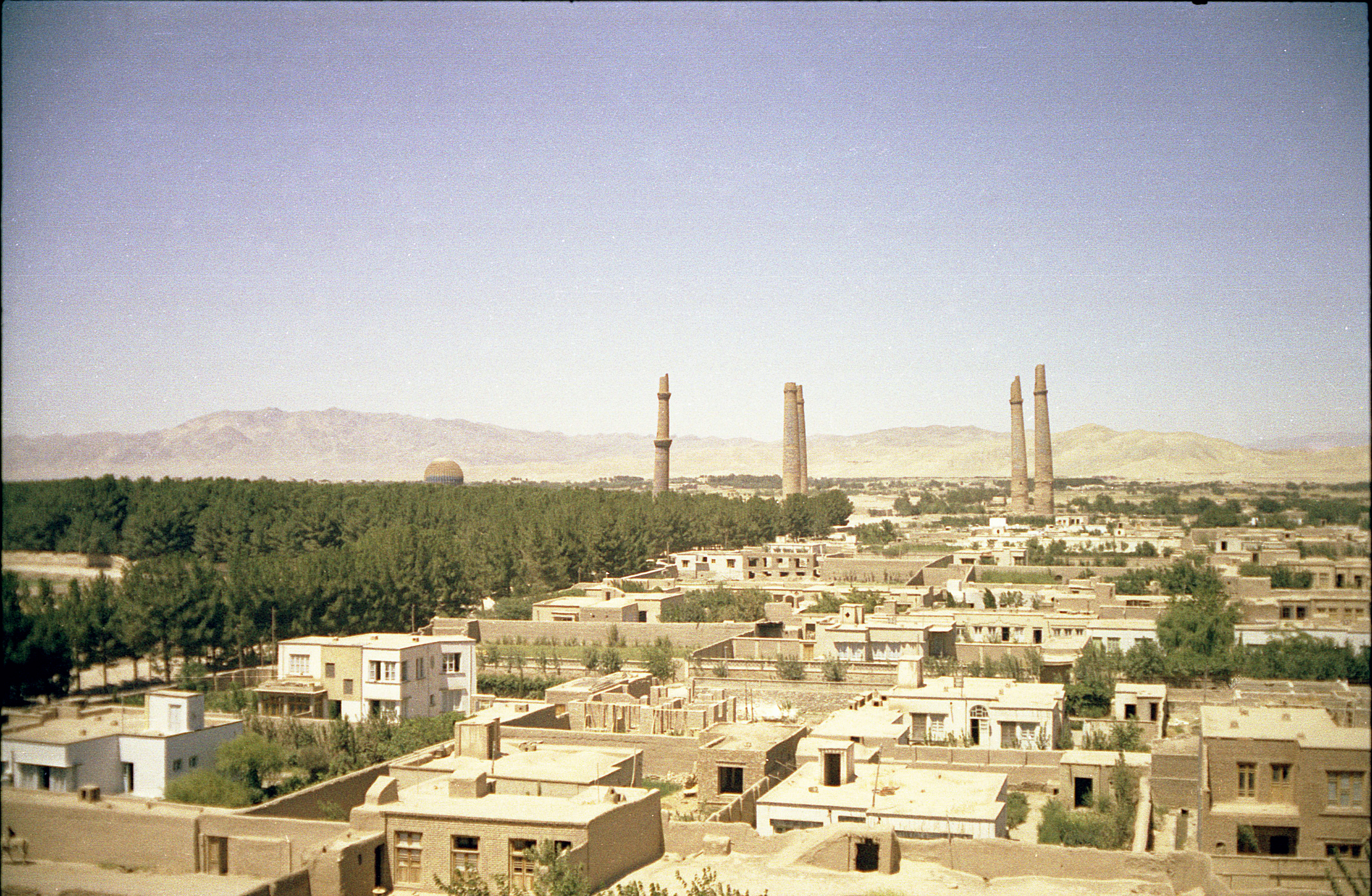
Herat in 1969.

The Herat uprising (Pashto: د هرات پاڅون, Dari: قیام هرات), locally known as the Uprising of 24th Hūt (Pashto: د ۲۴م کب پاڅون, Dari: قیام ۲۴م حوت), was an insurrection that took place in and around the city of Herat in western Afghanistan, across several days in March 1979. It included both a popular uprising and a mutiny of ethnic Tajik Afghan Army troops against the Democratic Republic of Afghanistan (DRA). The communist regime at first appealed to its Soviet allies for help, but the Soviet leadership declined to intervene. After the insurgents seized and held the city for about a week, the regime was able to retake it with its own forces, and the subsequent aerial bombardment and recapture of Herat left 3,000 to 25,000 of its inhabitants dead. It was the worst outbreak of armed violence in the country in 50 years, and was the deadliest incident in the 1978-1979 period following the Saur Revolution and before the start of the Soviet occupation in December 1979.

== Background ==
The events in Herat took place in the wider context of unrest against the communist reforms implemented by the DRA, of which the principal was agrarian reform. The reforms, besides contradicting tradition and the principles of Islam, in many cases worsened the situation of the rural poor they were supposed to reward. Starting in May 1978 in Nuristan, spontaneous uprisings took place throughout Afghanistan against the DRA and its policies.

The traditional culture of this Shia Persian-accented city, which included strains of mysticism, was relatively liberal compared to some other parts of the country, but was nevertheless still pious and opposed to the Sunni Pashtun-dominated government in Kabul. As with most other anti-regime resistances in 1979, their religious faith was a uniting factor.

== Uprising ==
The agrarian reform had taken place near Herat without opposition, as there was little solidarity between the rural farmers and the big landowners who mostly lived in the city. In this case the repression carried out by the Khalq against religious dignitaries, including Pir and Ulema, and traditional elites, is cited as a critical factor, as well as the government's literacy campaign, which had become controversial due in particular to the practice of mixed-gender literacy classes.

In Herat Province, isolated revolts had already taken place, but the uprising began in earnest on 15 March 1979. In the surrounding districts insurgents gathered around mosques, and following the preaching of their mullahs, marched on the city, where they were joined by many townsmen in attacking government buildings, and symbols of communism. The 17th Division of the Afghan Army was detailed by the regime to put down the rebellion, but this proved a mistake, as there were few Pashtun Khalqis in that particular unit and instead it mutinied and joined the uprising. A small group of soldiers, officials and Khalq activists withdrew into the city's Blue Mosque. The insurgents held Herat for about a week, during which the city underwent a period of anarchy. Rioters roamed the streets, chanting "Allahu Akbar", searching for government supporters and sarluchi (those with uncovered heads), indicating a lack of piety; communist officials, in particular teachers, were massacred. The bazaar was looted, and several Soviet advisers to the DRA were killed, though other foreigners were spared. The exact number of Soviets killed during the events is uncertain: some sources cite high figures of up to 200 but according to official Soviet sources, there were only two victims. Former DRA sources indicate that 3 or 4 Soviets were killed, possibly with their families. According to certain sources, the bodies of the dead advisers were paraded around the city by the rebels, but this is denied by other sources. Ghulam Mohammad, a participant of the rebellion and a former Mujahideen fighter, told TOLOnews that some rebels additionally fought with sticks and pickaxes. The rebellion did not have a unified leadership: on the military side, the mutineers were led by a group of Tajik officers under Sardar Jagran and Rasul Baloch which also included Ismail Khan and Alauddin Khan, who were associated with the Jamiat-e Islami party. Ismail Khan, who later became Amir of Jamiat-e Islami forces in Herat Province and a major Mujahideen commander, did not play a leading role in the revolt, as was later claimed by his supporters. Among the civilian insurgents, the situation was more confused, though some local figures played a significant role: Gul Mohammad, a Barakzai Pashtun from Gozargah, and Kamar-i Dozd and Shir Aga Shongar, two former convicts, led large groups of insurgents. The rebellion overran all the districts around Herat, except Obeh and Pashtun Zarghun where government command posts held out, and spread a few days later to Badghis Province, and then on to other neighbouring provinces.

After the initial shock of losing a major city and the defection of a whole division, the DRA reacted ruthlessly. The much more reliable 4th and 15th Armoured Brigades were sent from Pul-e-Charkhi, but due to the distance they had to travel, Hafizullah Amin ordered Major General Sayyed Mukharam, commander of the Kandahar garrison to send an armored force that could reach Herat faster. Additionally, Amin ordered the mobilization of the Afghan Commando Forces, stationed in Kabul, and the 2nd Army Corps, stationed in Kandahar. Mukharam's column of 30 tanks and 300 men arrived at Herat on March 20, waving green flags and Qurans, which induced the insurgents to believe that rebellion had spread to the whole country. The Khalq troops were thus allowed to pass, and recapture the city. The government forces then subjected Herat to an aerial bombardment, led by Shahnawaz Tanai and Abdul Qadir, with Ilyushin Il-28 bombers flying from Shindand Air Base, during which the city was heavily damaged, and thousands of Heratis were killed, though the exact death toll is uncertain: the lowest estimate runs at 3,000 to 4,000 dead, while the higher-case estimate reaches 25,000 dead. In 1992, a mass grave was uncovered, containing 2,000 bodies of those killed by Khalqist repression.

== Consequences ==
The events in Herat caused the Soviet leadership to realize that their Afghan allies were in crisis. Repeated demands from Nur Muhammad Taraki, president of the DRA, for Soviet military assistance in quelling the revolt, prompted a series of secret Politburo meetings. One such meeting took place on March 17, during which Foreign Minister Gromyko acknowledged that the DRA faced "thousands" of insurgents, but, in accordance with the Brezhnev Doctrine, asserted the "fundamental proposition" that "under no circumstances may we lose Afghanistan". Another Politburo member, Alexei Kosygin, expressed distrust of the DRA leadership, stating that "Amin and Taraki alike are concealing the true state of affairs from us". In a telephone conversation with Kosygin the following day, Taraki complained that he could no longer rely on the Afghan armed forces, even those trained in the Soviet Union, and his pleas for help became even more pressing: he requested that Soviet soldiers from the Soviet republics in Central Asia (many of which were inhabited by the same ethnic groups also found in Afghanistan) could be smuggled into Afghanistan in Afghan garb. However these requests were to no avail, and the Politburo initially moved towards a policy of non-intervention, which was later validated by Brezhnev. When Taraki visited Moscow on March 20, Kosygin explained to him the Soviet policy regarding Afghanistan:

...we carefully studied all aspects of this action and came to the conclusion that if our troops were introduced, the situation in your country would not only not improve, but would worsen. One cannot deny that our troops would have to fight not only with foreign aggressors, but also with a certain number of your people. And people do not forgive such things.

However, the Soviets did increase their military assistance in the following months by sending large quantities of equipment, including T-62 tanks, MiG-21 fighters and Mi-24 attack helicopters, along with extra advisers to service them. Despite this, the situation of the Afghan armed forces continued to deteriorate, with mutinies occurring in Jalalabad, Asmar, Ghazni, Nahrin, and in August 1979, the Bala Hissar uprising on a fortress in Kabul. Though these were all put down, the weakness of the military contributed significantly to the spread of the insurgency. On December 24, 1979, under Leonid Brezhnev, the Soviet Union deployed the 40th Army, commencing the start of the Soviet–Afghan War.

== Interpretations ==
The DRA claimed that the rebellion had been organized by Iran both in public and in private conversations, occurring a month after the Iranian Revolution. Relations between Khomeini's Iran and the socialist DRA were tense, and the Khalq leadership suspected collusion between the Iranian Ayatollahs and the Shiite communities of Herat, which made up half of the city's population. In a propaganda move, the regime took advantage of the return of 4,000 Afghan labourers from Iran, to claim that Herat had been infiltrated by Iranians dressed as Afghans.

Pravda prints charged that Pakistan, Egypt, China, the United States, United Kingdom and West Germany were responsible for the uprising, while also blaming Iran. It contradicted the assessments of the internal Soviet Politburo that it was caused by the DRA regime.

As a manifestation of the social and political forces at work in Afghanistan, the Herat uprising was the subject of academic research, which has offered contradictory explanations for it. Giorgio Vercellin presented the uprising as an anti-Pashtun movement, driven by the resentment of Persian-speaking communities against Pashtun settlers. This version is rejected both by Olivier Roy and by Gilles Dorronsoro, the latter pointing out that certain figures of the uprising such as Gul Muhammad, were ethnic Pashtuns, and that the revolt took hold equally in Pashtun-inhabited areas. However Vercellin claims that many in Herat viewed the DRA government as Ghilzai Pashtun oppression, the Khalqists (being ruled by Ghilzai Pashtuns) having overthrown the Barakzai dynasty reflared the Ghilzai-Durrani rivalry.

According to Olivier Roy, the Herat rebellion was an example of an organized rebellion, as opposed to the spontaneous anti-government revolts which occurred elsewhere in the country. Roy considers that the events in Herat bear the hallmark of strategy developed by Burhanuddin Rabbani, the leader of the Tajik Islamist party Jamiat-e Islami, consisting of a military coup by supporters infiltrated in the Army, supported by a popular uprising. To support this thesis, Roy points to the actions of Jamiat agents in the military (Ismail Khan and Alauddin Khan), and to links between Jamiat and the mawlawi who preached to the insurgents. Dorronsoro contested this interpretation, based on the relatively minor role played by Jamiat agents. While Jamiat office in Mashhad had opened communications with officers of the 17th Division several weeks before the events, the actual leaders of the mutiny were not aligned with that party (according to Dorronsoro, one of the two main ringleaders was a Maoist). In addition, the lack of coordination between the military and civilian insurgents, and the generally chaotic and unpredictable nature of the uprising indicate, in his view, that it was spontaneous rather than premeditated.

== See also ==
- Khalq
- Hafizullah Amin
- Afghanistan–Iran relations
