= 1980 Kabul protests =

1980 Kabul protests may refer to:

- 3 Hoot uprising (February)
- 1980 student protests in Kabul (April to June)
