= Koh Daman =

- Geographical and historical region
- Country: Afghanistan

Ethnic groups
  - Majority: Tajiks
- Languages: Dari Persian

Guldara stupa, Koh Daman

Koh Daman is a geographical and historical region north of the city of Kabul in Afghanistan. The region lies along the southern and eastern foothills of the Hindu Kush and, together with the Parwan–Kapisa plain, forms a major part of the area known as the "Shomali".

== Geography ==
Koh Daman lies north of Kabul and extends along the foothills of the Paghman Mountains. Geographically, the region is connected to Kabul and joins the Parwan–Kapisa plain to the north. Koh Daman is about 30 miles (48 km) long and varies from 4 to 12 miles (6.5 to 19 km) in width. Its western boundary is formed by the slopes of the Paghman Mountains, while to the south a range of low hills separates it from the Chahar Dehi plain. The Koh Daman plain is formed by alluvial deposits from rivers originating in the surrounding mountains. The Ghorband River and Panjshir River and their tributaries have played an important role in forming and irrigating the plain. The abundance of water and fertile soils have made Koh Daman one of the important agricultural areas around Kabul since ancient times.

== Name ==
The name "Koh Daman" is composed of the words koh (mountain) and daman (skirt or foothill), meaning "mountain slope" or "foot of the mountain". European historical sources of the 19th century also used the names Koh Daman and Koh-i-Daman for the region.

== Settlements ==
Charikar is the most important city of Koh Daman and the historical center of the northern part of the region. Charikar lies at the northern end of the long depression of Koh Daman and is situated at the intersection of historic routes between Kabul, Bamyan, Panjshir, and northern Afghanistan. Urban settlement at this location dates back to ancient periods, and historical sources have associated the site with the ancient region of Kapisa. Istalif is also one of the important historical settlements of Koh Daman. The town lies on the mountainous slopes overlooking the Shomali plain and has been renowned for its gardens, vineyards, and pottery industry. Other historical areas and settlements associated with Koh Daman include Bagram, Guldara, Qarabagh, Istalif, and parts of the Ghorband and Shomali areas; however, the boundaries of "Koh Daman" are not consistent across sources, and these units should not be regarded as synonymous with one another in every historical period.

== Population ==
In the contemporary period, Koh Daman is not a separate administrative unit with its own census; therefore, there is no single reliable population figure for the region as a whole. The population of the Koh Daman areas is today divided among several administrative units in Kabul and Parwan provinces and around the Shomali plain. Therefore, population figures for individual cities or districts cannot be applied to the region as a whole without first defining its exact geographical boundaries. Historical sources provide separate population figures for some cities of Koh Daman. For example, a 19th-century source from the Encyclopædia Britannica estimated the population of Istalif, together with its dependent villages, at about 18,000 and that of Charikar at about 5,000; these figures are historical and do not represent the present-day population of the region.

== Ethnicity ==
The indigenous population of much of Koh Daman is described in modern and historical sources as predominantly Tajik. Studies of the Shomali region and Istalif identify Tajiks as the predominant population of the area. In an ethnographic study of Istalif, the town is also described as being almost entirely Tajik, and the author explains that its inhabitants in many contexts regard themselves as part of the "Tajik" ethnic group. However, Koh Daman, and the Shomali region more generally, has not been completely ethnically homogeneous. In parts of the area surrounding Koh Daman, particularly in the eastern and southern areas, Pashtuns have also lived. Historical sources concerning the political developments of 1929 and 1930 also explicitly describe the inhabitants of Koh Daman as "Tajiks of Koh Daman". This is reflected in studies concerning ethnicity and the state in Afghanistan as well as in documents relating to the Koh Daman rebellion.

=== Conflict between indigenous inhabitants and Pashtun settlers ===
During the political developments of 1929 and the rise to power of Habibullah Kalakani, ethnic tensions between Tajiks and Pashtuns intensified in some parts of northern Afghanistan. Hugh Beattie writes that Kalakani's rise to power, who came from the Koh Daman area, reflected Tajik resentment of Pashtun domination as well, and that this was followed by attempts by indigenous inhabitants in some northern areas to drive out Pashtuns who had settled there.

== Language ==
The predominant indigenous language of Koh Daman is Afghan Persian (Dari). The Tajiks of the region generally speak varieties of Dari Persian, and Dari has been the principal language of communication in many parts of the Shomali region and around Kabul. Dari Persian has been used in the region not only in the home but also in markets and in communication between different ethnic groups. Linguistic sources concerning the Kabul region identify Dari as the predominant market language around Kabul. In parts of the western slopes and around Istalif and Qarabagh, remnants of Dardic languages, particularly Pashai, have also been reported in the past and into the contemporary period. Encyclopaedia Iranica records the westernmost distribution of Pashai people in a number of villages in Qarabagh District and settlements in Istalif and the western slopes of the Koh Daman valley. These languages have retreated over time in the face of the expansion of Dari Persian.

== Agriculture ==
Koh Daman has long been renowned for its gardens and vineyards. Geographical sources identify grapes as one of the region's characteristic products, while fruits such as apricots, peaches, apples, pears, and walnuts have also been cultivated in its gardens. In the 20th century, the production of grapes and raisins remained among the important agricultural activities of Koh Daman. World Bank documents from the 1960s also mention credit programs for Koh Daman grape farmers aimed at increasing production and improving the quality of grapes and raisins. Historical sources describe Koh Daman as one of the gardens around Kabul. Nineteenth-century reports mention various types of grapes, apricots, mulberries, apples, pears, peaches, walnuts, almonds, quinces, and plums in the region.

== Economy and markets ==
The traditional economy of Koh Daman was based on agriculture, horticulture, animal husbandry, handicrafts, and regional trade. The region's proximity to Kabul and its location along communication routes to northern Afghanistan contributed to its economic importance.

== Ancient history ==
Koh Daman is adjacent to one of the most important archaeological areas of Afghanistan. To the north of the region lies the site of Bagram, which has been associated with the ancient city of Kapisa and was of great importance during the Kushan period. Koh Daman's position between Kabul, Kapisa, Panjshir, and the routes crossing the Hindu Kush gave it strategic and economic importance. Excavations and archaeological finds at Bagram, including an extensive collection of coins and artifacts from different periods, demonstrate the historical importance of this area. Studies of the archaeological activities of Charles Masson also cover parts of the Koh Daman plain and the area around Bagram.

== Islamic and Timurid periods ==
During the Islamic periods, Koh Daman was part of the geographical area around Kabul and Kapisa. Its importance was primarily due to its fertile lands, gardens, and location along communication routes between Kabul and the northern regions. During the Timurid period and subsequently under the Mughals, the gardens and agricultural products of Koh Daman and Istalif received attention. Babur mentioned Istalif and the areas around Kabul in his writings, and modern scholarship also regards the Baburnama as an important historical source for the geography of the region.

== 19th century ==
Koh Daman was one of the important areas around Kabul during the first decades of the 19th century. European travel accounts from this period provide extensive information about the geography, gardens, villages, and routes of the region. John Wood described Koh Daman in his travel account as lying north of Kabul between the Paghman and Hindu Kush mountain ranges, and reported its length as about 31 miles and its average width as about 7 miles. Charles Masson also visited Koh Daman, Charikar, Istalif, Bagram, and Ghorband during his travels in Afghanistan and left numerous geographical and archaeological accounts of these areas. During the First Anglo-Afghan War, Charikar and Istalif witnessed fighting between British forces and local forces. Istalif was attacked by British forces in 1842, and parts of the town were destroyed.

== 20th century ==
Koh Daman played an important role in the political developments of Afghanistan in the late 1920s. In 1929, Habibullah Kalakani, who is identified in scholarly sources as a Tajik from the Koh Daman region, raised forces from this area and, during the revolt against the government of Amanullah Khan, captured Kabul. After the fall of Habibullah Kalakani's government and the rise to power of Nadir Shah, another rebellion took place in Koh Daman in 1930. Other files from the same collection concern refugees resulting from the Koh Daman rebellion in subsequent years.

== Contemporary wars ==
During the Soviet–Afghan War and the subsequent civil wars, Koh Daman and the Shomali plain were important military areas because of their proximity to Kabul and the importance of their communication routes. In the 1990s, heavy fighting also took place in Shomali. During the Taliban operations in 1999, Istalif, Qarabagh, Guldara, and Farza were among the areas affected by military operations and population displacement.

== Culture ==
The culture of Koh Daman is closely connected with the Persian-speaking culture of Shomali and Kabul. Horticulture, the production of grapes and raisins, Istalif pottery, and local markets have been among the recognized elements of the region's economy and culture.

== See also ==
- Shomali Plain
- Charikar
- Istalif
- Kapisa
- Bagram
- Parwan Province
- Paghman
- Ghorband
- Panjshir
