= Faiz Ahmad =

Afghan communist leader (1946–1986)

- فيض احمد
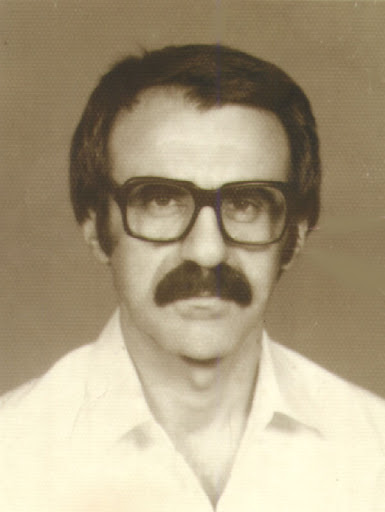

Leader of the Afghanistan Liberation Organization
- In office 1973 – 12 November 1986
- Preceded by: Party established

Leader of the Progressive Youth Organization
- In office 1965–1973

Personal details
- Born: 1946 Kandahar, Kingdom of Afghanistan
- Died: 12 November 1986 (aged 39–40) Peshawar, Pakistan
- Party: ALO (1973–1986)
- Other political affiliations: Shola-e Javid
- Spouse: Meena Keshwar Kamal
- Children: 3

Military service
- Allegiance: Pakistan
- Battles/wars: 1979 uprisings in Afghanistan: Bala Hissar uprising; Soviet–Afghan War

Faiz Ahmad (Pashto: فیض احمد; 1946 – 12 November 1986) was an Afghan politician who led the Afghanistan Liberation Organization (ALO), a Maoist organisation established in Kabul.

== Early life ==
Ahmad was born in Kandahar in 1946 to an ethnic Pashtun family. He attended primary and secondary schools in Kandahar before moving to Kabul to enter Naderia High School, where he became involved in the leftist movement after reading some of the works of Karl Marx and Vladimir Lenin.

Akram Yari, a leader of the Maoist movement in Afghanistan, was Ahmad's teacher in Naderia High School and he deeply influenced Ahmad’s political beliefs. Yari was leader of Progressive Youth Organization (PYO), a Maoist organisation which was formed on 6 October 1965. Later, Ahmad parted ways with PYO and formed the Revolutionary Group of People of Afghanistan.

After graduating from high school, Ahmad entered the Medical Faculty of Kabul University. During these years he would establish the Revolutionary Group of People of Afghanistan which was later named Afghanistan Liberation Organization (ALO).

== Anti government activity ==
On April 27, 1978, military officers loyal to the PDPA launched a "revolution" on the orders of Hafizullah Amin in what would become known as the Saur Revolution. Despite bringing the communist Khalqists into power many smaller socialist groups rejected the Khalqists rule for various reasons including the Pashtun hegemony of the new government, mistreatment of ethnic minorities, and their Soviet Influence. On August 5, 1979, a united front of anti-Khalqist Marxists and moderate Islamists attempted an uprising in southern Kabul. The uprising lasted 5 hours and was brutally crushed by the Khalqist government's MiG aircraft, artillery and tanks.

== Soviet-Afghan War ==
During the onset of the Soviet intervention in Afghanistan, Faiz Ahmad, instrumental in the re-organisation of the Afghanistan Liberation Organization, set the slogan "All resources at the service of liberation fronts!" as the interim objective of all "revolutionary struggle". During this time and under Faiz's leadership, the ALO decided to join the Islamist political forces in forming united fronts against the Soviet Union and the PDPA-Parcham government.

He wrote Mash'al-i Rehayi (The Beacon of Emancipation), an ALO political-theoretical publication, where he analysed the situation and established political and strategic lines for ALO activities.

== Assassination ==
Ahmad was assassinated along with six other ALO members by Gulbuddin Hekmatyar's Hezb-i-Islami on 12 November 1986 in Peshawar, Pakistan.

== Personal life ==
Ahmad married Meena Keshwar Kamal in 1976. Kamal was assassinated in Quetta, Pakistan on 4 February 1987. Reports vary as to who the assassins were, but are believed to have been agents of the Afghan Intelligence Service KHAD, the Afghan secret police. In May 2002, two men were hanged in Pakistan after being convicted of Kamal's murder.
