= Majid Kalakani =

- مجید کلکانی
- Born: 1939; Kalakan, Kingdom of Afghanistan
- Died: 8 June 1980 (aged 40–41); Kabul, Democratic Republic of Afghanistan
- Occupation: Revolutionary
- Organization(s): SAMA; Jabhe Motahed-e Milli
- Known for: Revolutionary leader in Afghanistan
- Movement: SAMA

Abdul Majid Kalakani (Persian: مجید کلکانی; 1939 – 8 June 1980) also known as Majid Agha was an Afghan communist politician. He was the founder and leader of the Liberation Organization of the People of Afghanistan (SAMA).

== Biography ==
Majid Kalakani was born in 1939 in the village of Kalakan in Shomali Plain of ethnic Tajik origin. In 1945 his father and grandfather were arrested and executed by the Mohammad Hashim Khan regime. Kalakani was a Maoist activist in the 1960s and a member of the movement Shalleh-ye Javiyd. In 1978, Kalakani founded SAMA. He was a leader of the Maoist resistance against the PDPA regime and Soviet invasion. In 1979 he founded the United National Front of Afghanistan. On 27 February 1980 Majid Kalakani was arrested near Kabul as the result of the 3 Hut uprising against Soviet occupation. He was executed on June 8, 1980.
