= 3 Hoot uprising =

Uprising and fatalities in Kabul

- Part of Soviet–Afghan War
- Kabul (Afghanistan)
- Location: Kabul, Democratic Republic of Afghanistan
- Date: Started on 22 February 1980: Lasted for 2 months
- Attack type: Uprising and riots against government
- Deaths: 600: 5,000+ arrested; Civilians killing; Abdul Majid Kalakani arrested and executed; Protest against mass arrest; Murder of Lieutenant Alexander Vovk
- Perpetrators: Soviet Union; Afghanistan; Maoist group SAMA

The 3 Hoot uprising (Dari: قیام 3 حوت, Qeyam-e 3 Hut) refers to a week of major civil unrest in Kabul, Afghanistan that started on 22 February 1980, occurring two months after the Soviet intervention. It is named after the date and month it started in the Solar Hijri calendar. Protests, rioting and a popular uprising against the Babrak Karmal-led Democratic Republic of Afghanistan government was triggered, by one account due to a series of mass arrests by the regime. Alternatively it has been said that the murder of Lieutenant Alexander Vovk, an instructor of the Soviet Komsomol, by an unknown gunman in the city, which led to the killing of civilians by a group of Soviet officers, led to the uprising.

Thousands of civilians, including leftists and Islamists, took part.

== Events ==
Demonstrations were held across the whole city against the Parcham government and against the Soviet occupation. Many residents chanted Allahu Akbar whilst the military fired rockets in the air to silence them. Protesters peacefully marched through streets, chanting religious and anti-Soviet messages. They were asked by security forces' loudspeakers to disperse, but they refused. Security forces then started firing at the protesters, and subsequently Soviet tanks were sent to quell the demonstrators. After six days of unrest, 600 civilians were estimated to have been killed in clashes.

It is not clear if the uprising was organized. It has been claimed that various organizations were involved, including the Maoist group Liberation Organization of the People of Afghanistan (SAMA). Others claim it to have been a spontaneous uprising by the "people of Kabul".

Government forces arrested 200 people on the eve of the revolt, and about 5,000 were arrested in the next few weeks. A number of Khalqists were also arrested, resulting in some residents not daring anymore to rise up. Many of the arrested were disappeared. The leader of SAMA, Abdul Majid Kalakani, was later arrested and executed.

The government blamed the uprising on agents from Pakistan, China and the United States. The event further isolated the government from the people. In the coming months, many "student uprisings" took place at Kabul University and other student institutions between pro-Khalqists, nationalists, anti-Marxists, and Islamic fundamentalists, which also resulted in clashes and arrests (see 1980 student protests in Kabul).

== See also ==
- 1980 student protests in Kabul
- List of massacres in Afghanistan
- Chindawol Uprising
