= Istalif District =

Coordinates: 34.833°N 69.077°E

- District
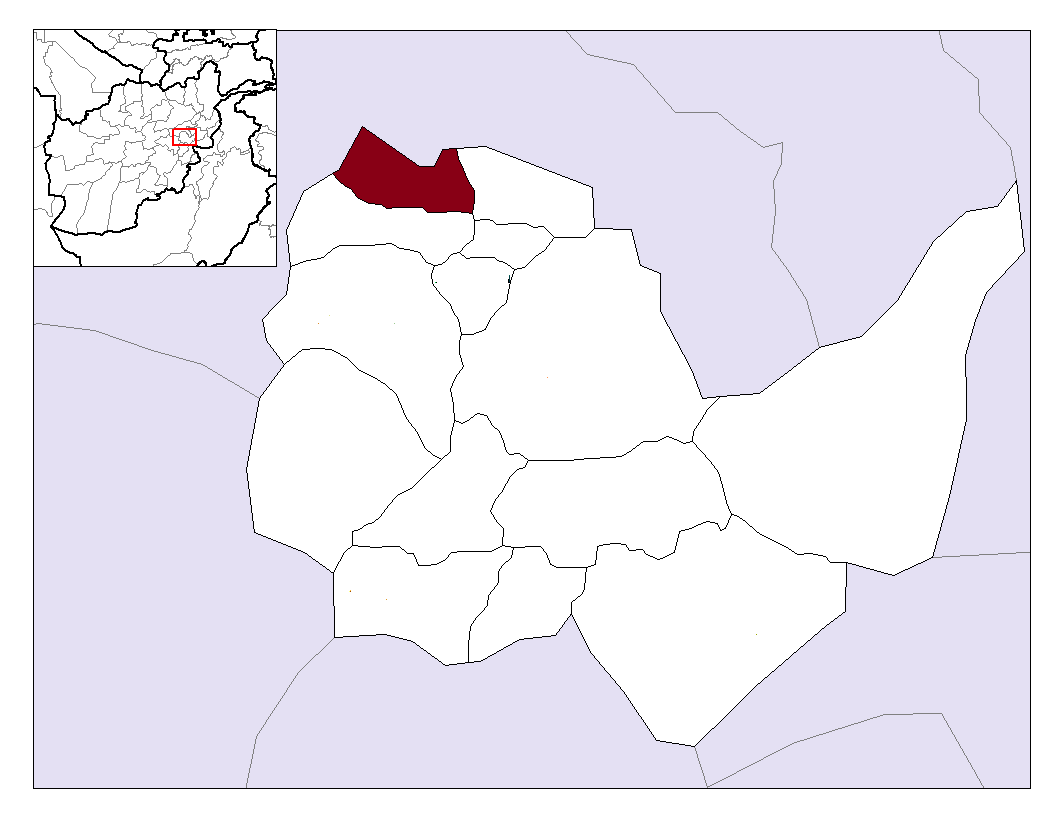
- Location in Kabul Province
- Country: Afghanistan
- Province: Kabul Province
- Capital: Istalif

Population (2015)
  - Total: 34,322
- Time zone: UTC+04:30 (AST)

Istalif District is located in the northwestern part of Kabul Province, Afghanistan. It has a population of 8,500 (2002 official UNHCR est.), a mixture of Tajiks, Pashtuns and Hazaras.

Istalif district borders Parvan Province to the north and west, Qarabagh District to the east and Guldara District to the south. The district capital is the village of Istalif, situated in the southeastern part of the district.

The villages of the district used to have a population of about 36,000 people, and were filled with fruit trees, vineyards, and vegetable gardens. But when the villages were destroyed, thousands fled for their lives, leaving behind ghost settlements in the continuing wars. All agricultural, health and education infrastructures were destroyed. New schools and a health center have been built in the last few years. Many houses had been rebuilt and the bazaar is alive.
