= Kalakan District =

- District
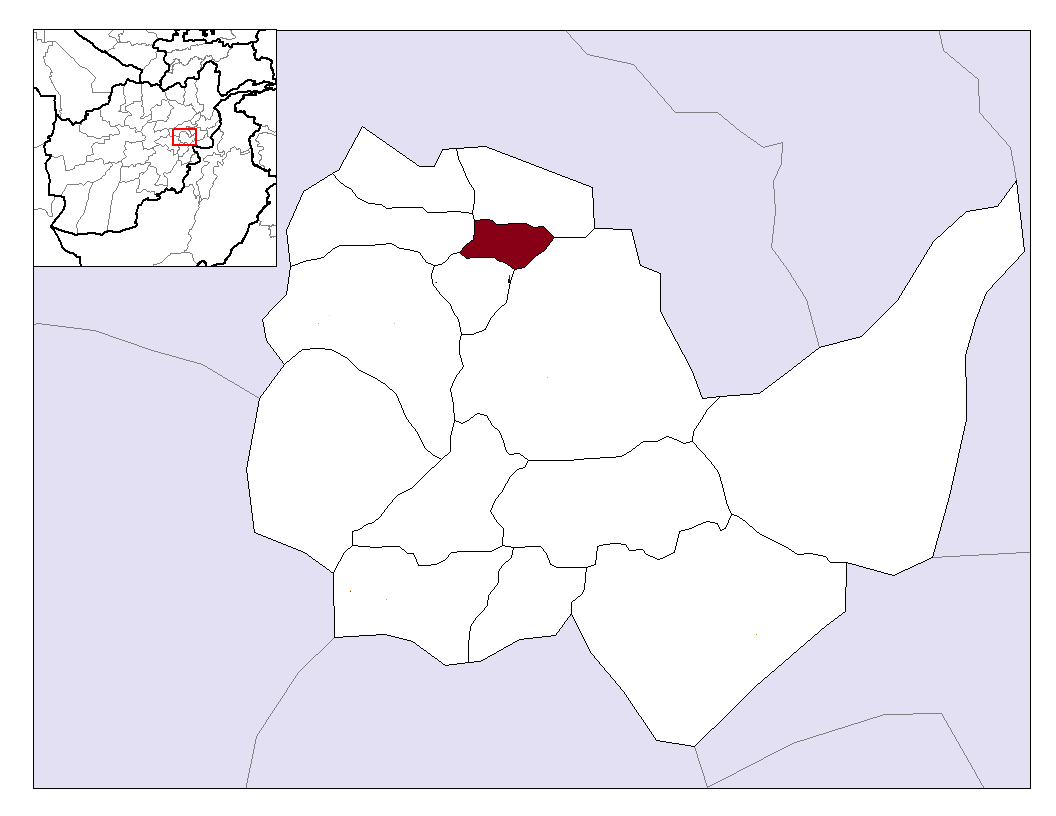
- Location in Kabul Province
- Country: Afghanistan
- Province: Kabul Province
- Capital: Kalakan

Population (2015)
  - Total: 30,962
- Time zone: UTC+04:30 (AST)

Kalakan District is located in the northern part of Kabul Province, Afghanistan. It borders Guldara District to the west, Qarabagh District to the north, Dih Sabz District to the east and Mir Bacha Kot District to the south. The population is 26,800 (2006). Tajiks form the majority of population. The center is the village of Kalakan, situated in the central part of the district. The district has been seriously affected by war. Most infrastructure was destroyed. The reconstruction and the return of the displaced families is a slow process.

== Kalakan and the residents ==
Amir Habibullah Kalakani was the Amir of Afghanistan for 9 months in 1929 after leading a successful revolt against King Amanullah with the help of various Pashtun tribes, who were against the King's rapid modernization plans. After his defeat and execution by Mohammad Nadir, Kalakani was given the name: Bacha-i-Saqao, son of a water carrier. Kalakani was a Tajik from the Shamali area, and was probably born in 1890.
