= Istalif =

Istālif استالف
- Village
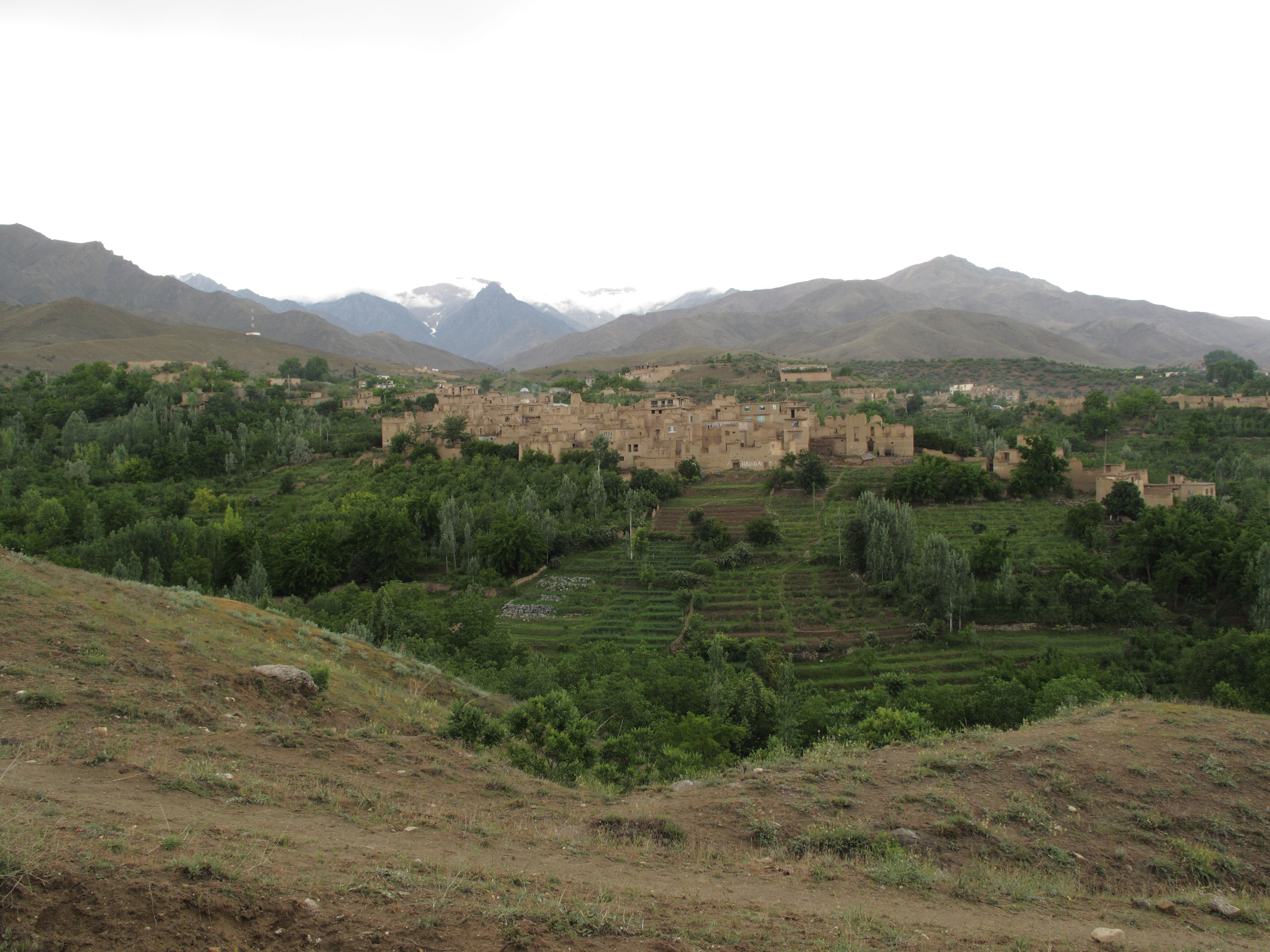
- Istalif Village

- Location in Afghanistan
- Coordinates: 34°50′N 69°6′E
- Country: Afghanistan
- Province: Kabul Province
- District: Istalif District
- People: Tajiks
- Time zone: UTC+4:30

Istālif (Persian: استالف) is a historic village in Kabul Province, Afghanistan, located in the Koh Daman area north of Kabul overlooking the Shomali Plain. The settlement is known for its long tradition of pottery production and for its orchards and vineyards.

The name Istalif may derive, through metathesis, from the Greek staphilè (“bunch of grapes”), reflecting possible Hellenistic influence in the region. Another proposed origin is from the Parāčī term estuf (“cow-parsnip”), a plant once typical at lower elevations in the Hindu Kush.

The villages of the Shomali Plain have traditionally been inhabited mainly by Tajiks, who speak Persian-Dari. Istalif is considered part of this Persian-speaking Tajik cultural area.

== History ==
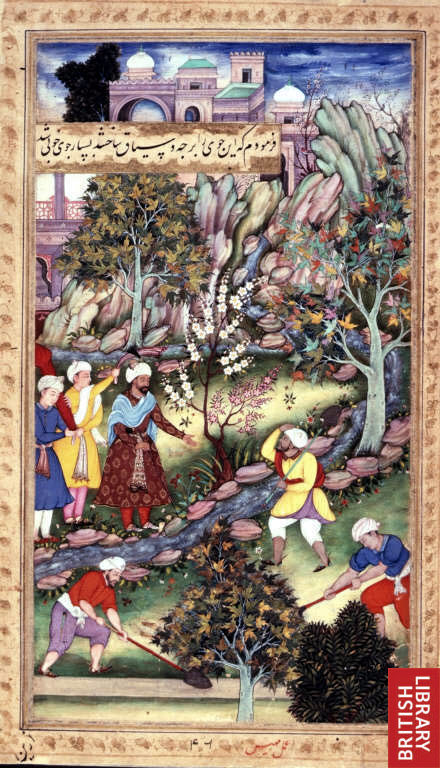
Babur and his men straighten the course of the winding stream at Istalif.

In the early 16th century, the Mughal ruler Babur admired the town and is said to have held gatherings in gardens and summer residences there. The town's terraced layout, abundant orchards, and streams made it a retreat in the region.

Nineteenth-century travellers left some of the earliest detailed descriptions of the settlement and its inhabitants. The British explorer Charles Masson described Istalif as one of the most beautiful places in the region, writing:

Istalif is one of the most picturesque spots which can be conceived; all that a combination of natural beauties can achieve we behold here in perfection: their effect is not diminished, but rather augmented by the rude appearance of the houses of the town. The scenery of the country around is extensive and grand, in happy unison with the keeping of the whole picture. The people of the country have a proverb, that he who has not seen Istalif has nothing seen.

A few years later, the Scottish explorer and British political officer Alexander Burnes likewise praised the landscape of the valley. Describing the view of the town, he wrote:

No written description can do justice to this lovely and delightful country… the town of Istalif rising in terraces above the valley.

Burnes also remarked on the character of the inhabitants, describing the Tajiks of the region as skilled and resilient fighters, despite common stereotypes portraying them as primarily agricultural or craft-based communities.

It is a source of deep regret that this beautiful country should be inhabited by a race of men so turbulent and vindictive as the Tajiks have here proved themselves to be; and yet, throughout Afghanistan generally, these same Tajiks form the most peaceable classes of population. Here, however, their blood-feuds are endless: a week never passes without strife or assassination, and I have been assured, on the best authority, that a man frequently remains immured in his own tower for two and three years from the fear of his enemies. It is rare to see a man go to bathe, hunt, or even ride out, without a part of his clan attending him as a guard. These people have the reputation of being the best foot-soldiers in Afghanistan, and from all I could learn they merit the distinction.

During the final phase of the First Anglo-Afghan War, as General Pollock's Army of Retribution marched into Kabul, many families fled to Istalif. On September 29, 1842, British troops were dispatched, which surrounded the town, attacked, and then systemically pillaged it. The British and Indian soldiers set fire to the cotton cloth of their victims and burnt them alive. They raped and massacred women and children as well. Five hundred women and children were captured. British troops, under Major General McCaskill, were ordered to burn the town.

During the final phase of the First Anglo-Afghan War, Istalif became the site of a major confrontation. In September 1842 British forces advancing toward Kabul surrounded and attacked the town. After capturing it, troops under Major General Pollock looted and burned much of the settlement. They raped and massacred women and children as well. Five hundred women and children were captured.

The surrounding Shomali Plain and the nearby Kohistan region have historically played an important role in Afghan politics. Because of the fertility of the land and the strategic position of the area north of Kabul, communities of the region frequently played a significant role in political struggles affecting the capital.

Several major uprisings that affected Kabul originated in this region. One of the most significant events was the 1929 uprising led by Habibullah Kalakani, a Tajik leader from the Shomali region who overthrew the rule of Amanullah Khan. Most of communities in the Shomali area supported Kalakani during the uprising.

Istalif suffered during both phases of the conflict. When Mohammad Nadir Shah, a Pashtun general under Amanullah Khan, took the throne after Habibullah Kalakani’s brief reign, he allowed Pashtun tribes to raid the Shomali Plain, targeting Tajik supporters of Habibullah, including the residents of Istalif. A year later, Mangals and other Pashtun tribes were again sent to suppress uprisings in Kohistan, causing further damage. Decades later, some Istalif residents still recalled the severity of these raids.

Until 1998, Istalif was a breadbasket for the region and surrounded by lush orchards growing grapes, roses and wheat. That year, the Taliban cut down trees, burnt homes, and killed livestock to punish the villagers for supporting the Northern Alliance's leader, Ahmad Shah Massoud. The village began rebuilding itself after 2002.

== Ceramics ==
Istalif ceramics refers to a centuries-old tradition of handmade pottery produced in the village of Istalif. Known for its turquoise and deep green glazes, Istalif pottery is celebrated as one of the most significant artistic contributions of the Tajik community to the Central Asian artisan tradition.

The pottery tradition in Istalif is deeply intertwined with the history of the local Tajik community in the Shomali Valley. Local oral tradition traces the lineage of the master potters (known as ustads) to Sayyid Mir Kulal, a legendary Sufi saint and master potter from Bukhara, who is said to have settled in the region over 400 years ago.

Istalif is the center of ceramics in the region and especially well-known for its unique turquoise color. The glaze to create the color comes from the Ishkar plant, a desert plant found in Balkh, located in northern Afghanistan. In Istalif, pottery can pass on several generations in the same family.

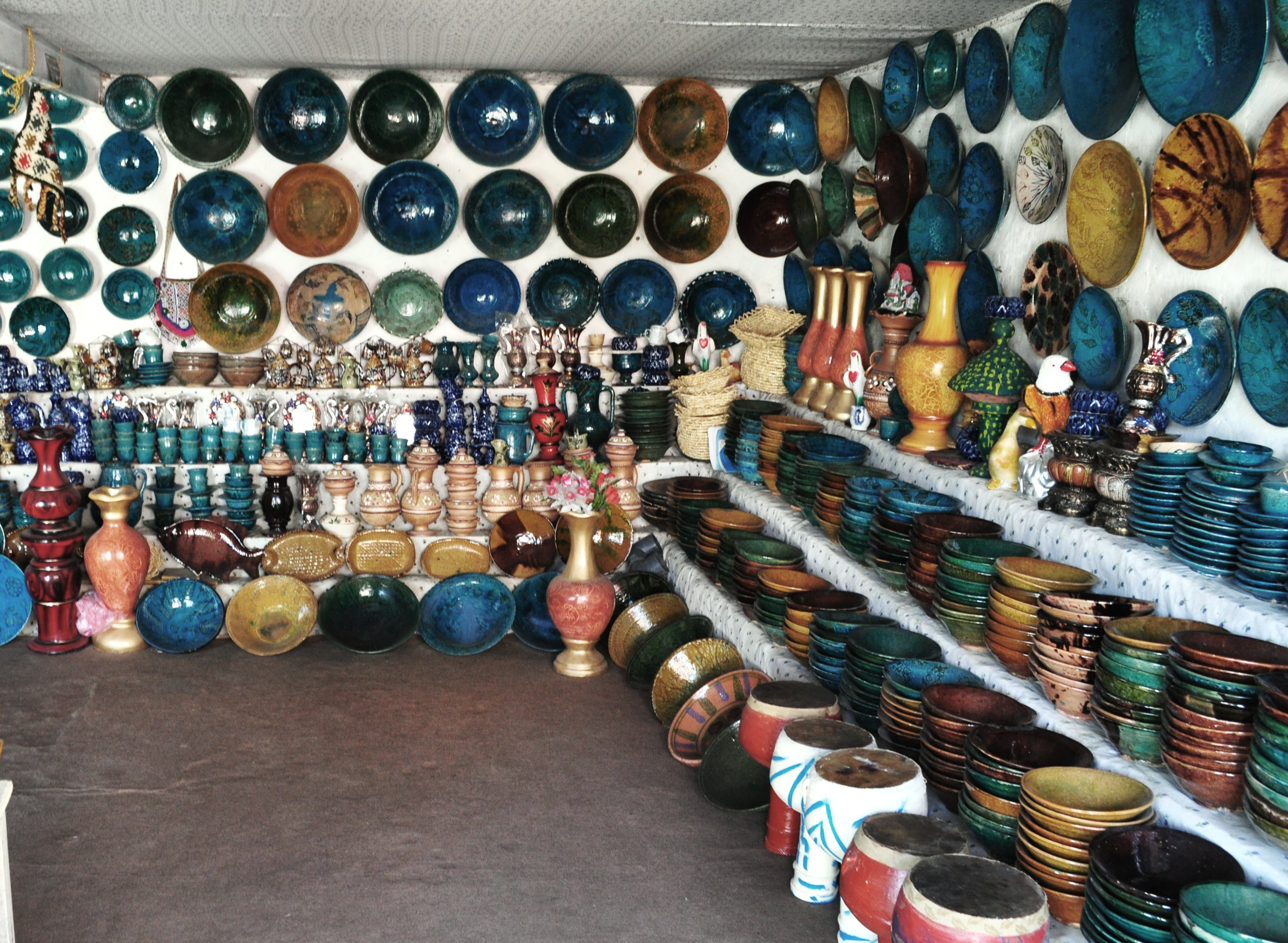
A shop in Istalif selling pottery.

== Gallery ==
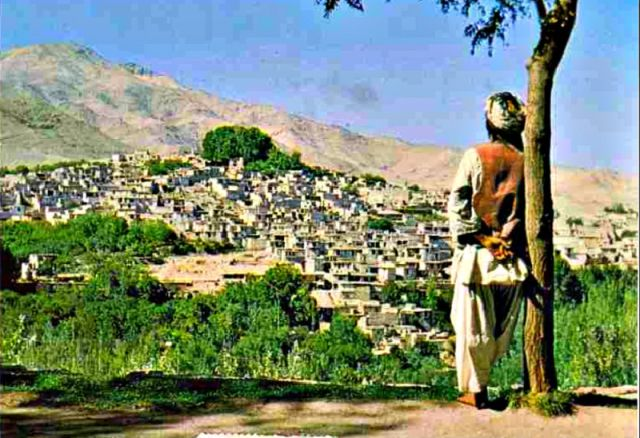
Postcard of Istalif, circa 1950s

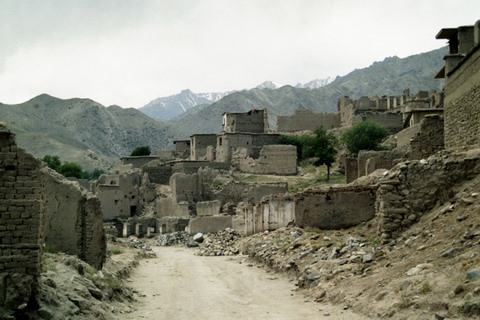
Inside Istalif after the Taliban war
