= Communist Party of Bhutan (Marxist–Leninist–Maoist) =

Underground Maoist communist party in Bhutan

- Abbreviation: CPB (MLM)
- Leader: Comrade Umesh
- Founded: 7 November 2001 (informal); 22 April 2003 (announced)
- Banned: 2003
- Armed wing: Bhutan Tiger Force
- Ideology: Communism; Marxism–Leninism–Maoism; Republicanism
- Political position: Far-left

Party flag

The Communist Party of Bhutan (Marxist–Leninist–Maoist) (abbr. CPB (MLM)) is an underground Marxist-Leninist-Maoist party in Bhutan. It aims to start a New Democratic Revolution and overthrow the Bhutanese monarchy and the House of Wangchuck. Its armed wing is the Bhutan Tiger Force, which had an estimated 600 to 1,000 cadres in 2009. The party's leader uses the nom de guerre Comrade Umesh.

== History ==
In the 1990s, Nepali-speaking Bhutanese peoples protested against the Bhutan government for democratization and language reforms. The government forcibly evicted the protesters, where they were put into refugee camps in eastern Nepal. Those who stayed have faced widespread discrimination. Inside the refugee camps, insurgent groups sprung up, including the Communist Party of Bhutan (Marxist–Leninist–Maoist). The CPB (MLM) was announced publicly on 22 April 2003, as stated on the website of the Communist Party of Nepal (Maoist)—now called Communist Party of Nepal (Maoist Centre), or CPN(M).

The Royal Bhutan Army defused a bomb planted by the CPB (MLM) in Phuentsholing village, near the Bhutan–India border, on 25 April 2007.

During Bhutan's transition to a constitutional monarchy in 2008, the CPB (MLM) insurgents carried out five explosions across Bhutan, including one in the capital Thimphu. They also declared the beginning of a "people's war".

In March 2008, Bhutanese police killed five suspected CPB (MLM) insurgents and arrested seventeen more in various operations in the south. The CPB (MLM) ambushed six forest rangers, killing four and wounding two in Singye village, Sarpang District near Sarpang on 30 December 2008.

A Bhutanese reporter was arrested in January 2009 after authorities suspected him of being a CPB (MLM) member.

During the 16th South Asian Association of Regional Co-operation meeting, security was tightened after threats by the CPB (MLM).

== Ideology ==
Shortly after its founding, the CPB (MLM) released a ten-point program which outlined its demands from the government. The party's ideology is oriented around Marxism–Leninism–Maoism; its cadres hope to start a "people's war" and a "New Democratic Revolution".

The group seeks to repatriate the Lhotshampa refugees and declare Bhutan a "sovereign democracy". The CPB (MLM) also wants to turn Bhutan into a republic.

== International connections ==
The CPB (MLM) has close ties to Maoists in neighbouring Nepal, whom the party considers to be its inspiration. The CPB (MLM) also has links to Naxalite rebels in India's northeast, with CPB (MLM) insurgents reportedly being trained by these groups.

== Bhutan Tiger Force ==
Bhutan Tiger Force
- Leader: Comrade Umesh
- Founded: 22 April 2003
- Country: Bhutan
- Allegiance: Communist Party of Bhutan (Marxist–Leninist–Maoist)
- Ideology: Communism; Marxism–Leninism–Maoism; Republicanism
- Political position: Far-left

The Bhutan Tiger Force (BTF) was the armed wing of the CPB (MLM).. The BTF was formed alongside CPB (MLM), and is responsible for conducting the group's militant actions. The South Asian Terrorism Portal lists the gruup as inactive.

=== History ===
On 13 December 2007, the BTF injured a refugee at the Beldangi I camp near Sangam Chowk in Damak, Nepal.

On 16 January 2008, a Royal Bhutan Army (RBA) patrol exchanged fire with a group of Tiger Force militants in Lower Dhanessey in Tsirang.

On 23 April 2008, a bomb planted by BTF rebels was defused near a bridge in Phuntsholing.

On 30 December 2008, BTF insurgents attacked six forest rangers in Singye village after they set off a BTF landmine, killing four and injuring another in the engagement. The BTF insurgents also took some of the forest rangers' weapons.

== See also ==
- Communist Party of India (Maoist)
- Naxalite–Maoist insurgency
- Nepalese Civil War
- Unified Communist Party of Nepal (Maoist)
