= Akram Yari =

Afghan Maoist activist (1940–1979)

- Akram Yari

Progressive Youth Organization

Personal details
- Born: 1940 Jaghori, Ghazni Province, Afghanistan
- Died: 1979 (aged 38–39) Kabul, Afghanistan
- Occupation: Politician; School teacher
- Known for: Revolutionary leader in Afghanistan

Akram Yari (Dari: اکرم یاری) was an Afghan Maoist political organizer in Afghanistan from Hazara ethnicity. He was the leader and founder of the Progressive Youth Organization (PYO), a Marxist–Leninist organization which was formed on October 6, 1965.

== Early years ==
Akram Yari was born in Jaghori, Ghazni Province, Afghanistan and belonged to Hazara ethnic group. He was the son of a monarchist landowner. Later he moved to Kabul where he studied physics and mathematics. After graduating, he became a teacher at Naderya School in Kabul, where he engaged in a political propaganda campaign among his students. As a result, he was fired from his job and he returned to Jaghori. Upon returning to Jaghori, Yari decided to hand over his family's possessions to the peasants.

== Political activism ==
Akram Yari was the founder and leader of Progressive Youth Organization (PYO), a Maoist organization, founded on October 6, 1965. PYO published a magazine called Shola-e-Jawid (Eternal Flame) which was circulated among students and youth.

Akram Yari opposed the monarchy of King Zahir Shah, the Islamic fundamentalists, and the pro-Soviet People's Democratic Party of Afghanistan (PDPA). PYO adhered to Marxism–Leninism–Mao Zedong thought, and rallied for the overthrow of the incumbent order in Afghanistan by means of civil war. Yari was additionally an atheist, reportedly once saying “they say God created man, but who created God?” during a religious studies class he hosted while being a teacher.

== Influence ==
Under Akram Yari's leadership, PYO had strong support among the masses of workers and students in the cities of Afghanistan. Among the people of Afghanistan, the movement that PYO led is famous by the name of Shola-e-Jawid and its members were commonly known as the Sholayis (Flamists), after the name of their journal.

Akram Yari was a teacher and propagator of Marxism and introduced Marxism to a large number of intellectuals and political activists in Afghanistan, among them Dr. Faiz Ahmad, founder of Afghanistan Liberation Organization (ALO).

== Arrest and assassination ==
In 1978 the pro-Soviet PDPA came to power through a military coup. The PDPA government began a crackdown on PYO cadres. Akram Yari was arrested at his home in Jaghori, transferred to Kabul and later killed by the PDPA government. The exact circumstances surrounding his death are not known.

== See also ==
- Progressive Youth Organization
- Shalleh-ye Javiyd
- List of Hazara people
