= Panjshir =

Panjshir may refer to:

- Panjshir Province, a province in northeastern Afghanistan
  - Panjshir Valley, a valley in Panjshir Province, near the Hindu Kush mountain range
    - Panjshir River, a river in the Panjshir Valley
    - Panjshir offensives (Soviet–Afghan War) (1980–1985), series of battles in the Panjshir Valley between the Soviets and the Afghan mujahideen under Ahmad Shah Massoud
    - Panjshir Front, Afghan mujahideen under Ahmad Shah Massoud in the Panjshir Valley during the Soviet–Afghan War (1979–1989)
    - Panjshir conflict or the Republican insurgency in Afghanistan (2021–), insurgency in the Panjshir Valley against the Taliban government
    - National Resistance Front of Afghanistan or Panjshir resistance, anti-Taliban alliance in the Panjshir Valley leading the Republican insurgency
  - Panjshir University, university in Panjshir Province, Afghanistan

== See also ==
- Ahmad Shah Massoud, known as the "Lion of Panjshir", Afghan military leader and politician
