= Afghanistan Mujahedin Freedom Fighters Front =

United front of four Afghan paramilitary factions

- جبهه مبارزين مجاهد افغانستان
- AMFF symbol
- Leader: Mulavi Dawood
- Dates active: 1979–1986
- Groups: Islamic Revolutionary Movement of Afghanistan; Afghanistan Liberation Organization; Liberation Organization of the People of Afghanistan; Sazman-e-al-Jihad; Society for the Defense of Islam; National Liberation Front
- Ideology: Afghan nationalism Anti-imperialism; Anti-Soviet; Anti-PDPA; Factions: Maoism; Islamism
- Political position: Big tent
- Wars: Soviet–Afghan War

Afghanistan Mujahedin Freedom Fighters Front (Persian: جبهه مبارزين مجاهد افغانستان, AMFF, Pashto: د افغانستان د مبارزو مجاهدینو جبهه) was a united front of four Afghan paramilitary factions including the Revolutionary Group of the Peoples of Afghanistan (RGPA, later named Afghanistan Liberation Organization [ALO]) and the Liberation Organization of the People of Afghanistan (SAMA)—together with Traditionalists Islamists including the Afghanistan National Liberation Front, in June 1979. They set aside their ideological differences in the fight against a common enemy. The Front fought against the pro-Soviet government and later also the Soviet Army during the Soviet–Afghan War. However, they would collapse after the head of AMFF, Mulavi Dawood, was abducted and killed by the Islamic Party in Peshawar in November 1986.

== History ==
During the mid-1960s and the mid-1980s, Maoism in Afghanistan developed into a political movement that emerged from middle class intellectuals during reformist movements. This was made possible by the introduction of the new constitution in 1964 that leaned more towards political liberalization. The constitution established a constitutional monarchy with elected representation and separation of power. The king would become "protector of the basic principles of the sacred religion of Islam".Parliament was separated into the Shura (Parliament) and the Wolsei Jiraga (the house of people) that were elected by citizens. This heavily mirrored Western governments, contributing to the growth of new ideologies like Maoism. During this time, Marxist literature was being introduced to university students. These books mostly came from Iran and were smuggled into Afghanistan through the border.

The main provinces where Maoist beliefs were strongest included Herat, Farah, and Nimruz; this can be attributed to their close proximity to Iran. The main goal of Maoists in Afghanistan was to change the current order, overthrowing the existing constitutional monarchy and establish socialism. Inspired by the teachings of Mao Zedong, Maoists in Afghanistan believed in a peasant-based revolution where they would overtake cities by numbers. Afghanistan lacked a large industrial class and Maoists believed that revolution had to start in the countryside in order to be successful.

The first major Maoist organization to emerge in Afghanistan was the PYO or Eternal Flame. The organization rejected Soviet-style communism which was promoted by the People's Democratic Party of Afghanistan (PDPA). They rejected the PDPA government's ideology of state control of the economy and rigid class structures, that divided the rural and urban population. However, the different Maoist groups became fractured because of opposing views on whether to strictly follow Maoism or work with the current government.

Following the 1978 Saur Revolution, which overthrew the previous president Mohammed Daoud Khan, and established the PDPA, violently repressed Maoist factions and many groups had to flee into rural areas. The Mujahedin Freedom Fighters Front attempted their own coup in 1978 in Bala Hissar (a historic fortress in Kabul) but was violently suppressed. The plan was to alert civilians throughout certain districts to attack government buildings, but the PDPA were alerted of this plan after a Maoist representative was captured. By the 1980s Maoists in Afghanistan were fractured and had almost collapsed because of government repression and rival factions backed by global powers like the Soviet Union. Many Maoist leaders were killed because of political conflict and lost influence because China had moved away from Maoism after the death of Mao Zedong in 1976. Furthermore, after the Soviet-Afghan war, China reduced their numbers near the border of Xinjiang and stopped training rebel fighters, which further caused further fragmentation between Maoists in Afghanistan and other rebels against the communist regime. These events reflected Cold War tensions because the PDPA was backed by the Soviet Union and other AMFF (Afghanistan Mujahdein Freedom Fighters) groups were supported by the U.S. through providing weaponry to fight against the government. This would further isolate Maoists, politically leading to further fragmentation and political instability in the country because of foreign intervention.
