= 1980 student protests in Kabul =

Uprising of students and clashes

- Part of Soviet–Afghan War
- Date: Late April to early June 1980
- Location: Kabul, Afghanistan
- Caused by: Afghanistan government victory; Soviet occupation of Afghanistan

Parties
Afghanistan: Afghan Army; KhAD (alleged); Parchamite Youth; Soviet Union	Khalqists; Islamists; Maoists

Casualties and losses
	between 72 and 200 students killed: Poisoning of students; 400 to 2,000 arrested; Nahid Saaed killed

Large-scale organized protests by students in the city of Kabul, Afghanistan, paralyzed the education system and led to heavy clashes. The uprisings by students took place from late April to early June 1980, demonstrating against the communist government of Babrak Karmal and the invading Soviet Union forces, calling for freedom and the withdrawal of Soviet forces. The protests were quelled and led to a large number of students being arrested, estimated between 400 and as many as 2,000. Between 72 and 200 students lost their lives in the demonstrations.

== Background ==
With Operation Storm-333 in December 1979, the Soviet Union launched a full-scale invasion of its central Asian neighbor and installed Babrak Karmal as the Afghan head of state. The invasion caused widespread opposition and panic, with armed Afghan mujahideen fighters gearing up a war against the Red Army. Meanwhile, opposition and unrest also occurred in urban areas, most notably in Kabul when thousands of residents rose up in February 1980 in the uprising of 3 Hoot, challenging the authority of the People's Democratic Party of Afghanistan.

== Start of demonstrations (April) ==
The academic year began in March 1980 after the winter holidays. Within a month's time, students at various institutes in the city distributed anti-government leaflets. One of these, Falah (meaning "salvation"), demanded the withdrawal of Soviet troops and called for a united front between ideologically different students. The first major student protest took place on April 21, 1980, during the new flag ceremony of the Democratic Republic of Afghanistan. On the fifth day of demonstrations, five students were fired upon and killed, four belonging to Omar Shahid High School and one from Habibia High School, a boys' school. It has been claimed that the shooters were not security forces but armed Parchamite youth.

Students of Soriya Senior High School, a girls' school, organized a large rally on April 29, shortly after the reclusive second anniversary of the Saur Revolution. They were joined by students of other schools marching towards and in the campus of Kabul University, shouting "liberty or death", calling for Russians to leave, and shouting death chants against president Karmal. The protesters attempted to leave campus and head to downtown Kabul only to be blocked by security.

An Afghan eyewitness reported to The Washington Post that Soviet troops opened fire and killed 16 or 17 students on that day. Another account said that Parchamite youth shot at several students, killing some of them.

=== Killing of Nahid Saaed ===
On April 30, a female junior from Rabia-e Balkhi High School called Nahid Saaed (ناهيد صاعد) was at the front row of a demonstration when she threw a headscarf of her classmate at PDPA-sympathizing soldiers. Nahid shouted at them

"You did not defend your homeland against the Russians. Rather, you support them, so let us put on our tents and leave our weapons to us to protect the freedom of our homeland. The Russians get out of our property, otherwise you will drown in a river of blood."

She and some other students were fired upon by the security forces, killing them. The news of Nahid's death quickly spread throughout the city and she became a symbol of defiance. She became popularly known as Nahid-e Shahid (Martyr Nahid).

The uprising of that day and the martyrs were depicted by the famous Afghan poet Khalilullah Khalili.

== Further demonstrations (May) ==
Greater numbers of university students took to the streets on May 3, heading towards the city. Less vocal this time, they took into account the Fundamental Principles of the Democratic Republic of Afghanistan, which was now in effect and guaranteed the right to peaceful demonstrations. As the students reached a part of the city called Barikot, a contingent of army soldiers encircled them. Eventually protesters were beaten by clubs, tear gas used, and as many as 500 students were arrested.

High schools in the city remained besieged with students continuing to boycott. Students, particularly female, were loud in denouncing both Leonid Brezhnev and Vladimir Lenin in their slogans.

Angry students reportedly throughout the demonstrations had killed at least 17 classmates who were supporters of the Karmal government. A Marxist principal was also lynched.

== Poisonings of schools (June) ==
At the start of June 1980, for three consecutive days numerous students from Sorya High School and other schools were poisoned. The state Bakhtar News Agency said that 60 schoolchildren and teachers were hospitalized on June 8 by the poisonings, blaming "bandits and mercenaries of imperialism" for the act. A few days later on June 12, an even greater number of students from ten different schools were poisoned, with reportedly over 500 people needing hospital treatment but no fatalities.

It has not been proven who was behind these attacks, with the state blaming imperialists of the mujahideen while the latter blamed the regime and the Soviet Union. In Kabul it was widely believed that the KHAD (intelligence) was behind it with the goal of intimidating students and their families.

== Analysis ==
Unlike the 3 Hoot uprising in February, the students' demonstrations were organized. Seven anti-government student unions had been formed by April 1980, the biggest of which was the council of the Revolutionary Youth with members from various institutions. The protesters were of various ideologies: nationalists, anti-Marxists, Islamists and Maoists all joined. Even pro-Khalq students opposing the Parchamites were present.

=== Testimony of a Soriya student ===
A female student of Soriya High School named Nahid (not related to the Nahid who was shot and killed) who fled to the United States spoke at the United States House Committee on Foreign Affairs in June 1981. She claimed in a testimony that her and her classmates's boycott on a day in April 1980, with a sympathizing teacher, led to vehicles of armed Afghan soldiers arriving at the school when discovered by the school principal who was a Parchamite. Armed Afghan soldiers at the schoolyard were met by the defiant students who told them "Instead of shooting Russians, you are going to fire on us, your Afghan sisters". The soldiers, who were not affiliated to the PDPA, were reportedly "deeply moved" by the words Nahid and others made, laying down their rifles and refusing to follow the orders of shooting the students. The military vehicles in which PDPA sympathizing soldiers were in were hit by stones thrown by the students who then left the gates. Soriya students went outside the campus where they were joined by students from a boys' school. A large number of Soviet soldiers arrived at the scene, leading to a quarrel. Several shots were fired, wounding and killing many boys and girls, with Nahid describing the road turning blood soaked red. The Afghan and Soviet soldiers in jeeps also refused to transport the wounded to hospital, Nahid claiming that one Afghan soldier told them "Let these microbes of society die. Why do you want their foul corpses taken to hospital?".

=== Aftermath ===
The state reported on June 9 that 140 people had died during the demonstrations since April. Radio Afghanistan blamed American and Chinese "chauvinists" for the deaths and disruption of education. According to diplomats, about 400 students had been arrested.

The demonstrations, coming soon after the February uprising, further damaged the Parcham government politically and morally and eroded the little support Babrak Karmal already had. The government dismissed or transferred teachers suspected of inciting students. It also speeded up the Sovietization of the education system.

Schools in Kabul remained paralyzed and numerous students fled abroad, especially after the poisoning incidents. Due to fear from the KHAD, no more rallies were attempted and students instead concentrated on boycotts.

== See also ==
- List of massacres in Afghanistan
