= Chindawol =

Chindawol چنداول
- Neighborhood of Kabul
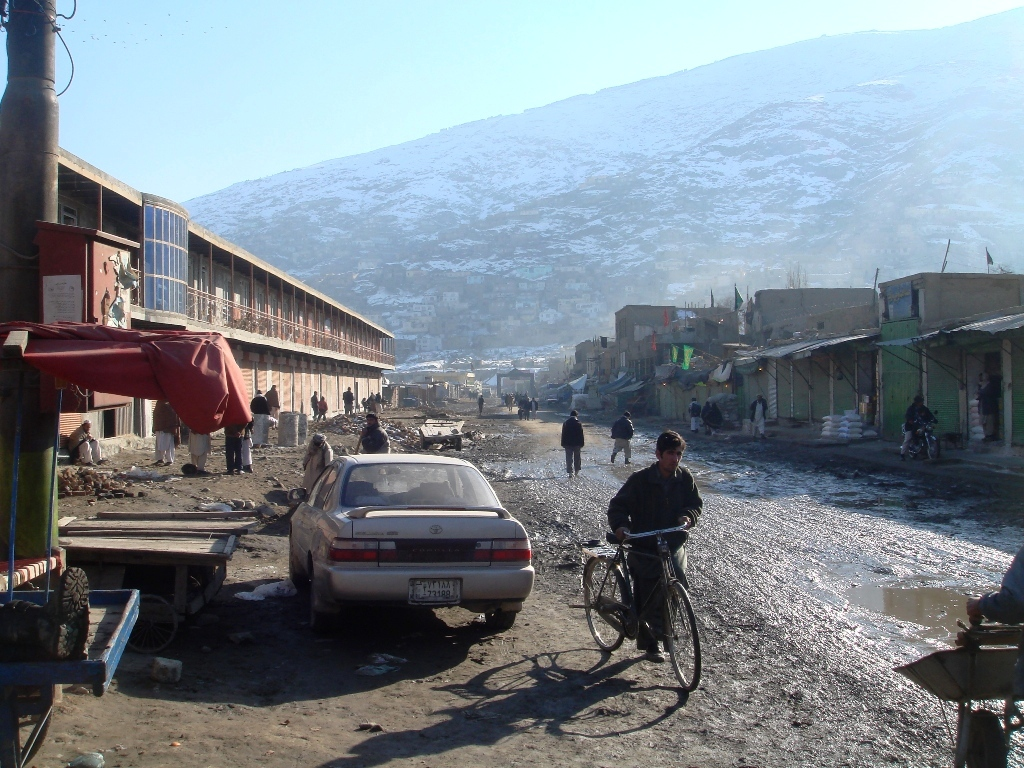
- Market street, Chindawol

- Map of Kabul
- Coordinates: 34.5117°N 69.1753°E
- Country: Afghanistan
- Province: Kabul Province

Chindawol or Chendavol (Dari: چنداول) is a neighborhood in the older section of Kabul, Afghanistan. It is located west of downtown Kabul, and south of Shahr-e-Now. Chindawol is also near the Asamai Mountains

== Population ==
The majority of the people in this region are Afghan Qizilbash. Most of the people residing here are also members of Shia Islam, as there are many Shia Mosques in the area.

== Chindawol uprising ==
The Chindawol uprising was an insurrection that took place on June 23, 1979 in the Chindawol district in the old city of Kabul, Afghanistan. The rebellion was started by the arrests of scholars and influential fighters of the city's Shia community by the ruling Khalq-PDPA government. The protests escalated when residents attacked and held a police station that day, marching on the streets whilst shouting religious and anti-government slogans. Several thousands took part. The government cracked down on them in a four-hour battle. Hazaras and kurdish Qizilbash's were arrested and executed.

== See also ==
- Neighborhoods of Kabul
- Chindawol uprising
