= Kalakan =

Village in Kabul Province, Afghanistan

- Location in Afghanistan
- Coordinates: 34°46′51″N 69°8′55″E
- Country: Afghanistan
- Province: Kabul Province
- District: Kalakan District
- Elevation: 5,280 ft (1,610 m)
- Time zone: UTC+4:30

Kalakan (Pashto, Dari: کلکان; Pashto pronunciation: [ka.la'kɑn], Dari pronunciation: [kä.lǽ.'kɑ́ːn]) is a village located in the center of Kalakan District, Kabul Province, Afghanistan.

== Notable People of Kalakan ==
- Habibullāh Kalakāni, Afghan revolutionary leader who deposed the Barakzai Dynasty and captured vast swathes of Afghanistan, including the city of Kabul, as the commander of the rebel forces during the 1928-1929 Afghan Civil War, becoming the King and Emir of Afghanistan
- Majid Kalakani, Afghan S.A.M.A. Maoist resistance leader in the 1980s

== See also ==
- Kalakan District
- Kabul Province
