= Shomali Plain =

Plateau in Afghanistan

Coordinates: 34°51′32″N 69°14′2″E

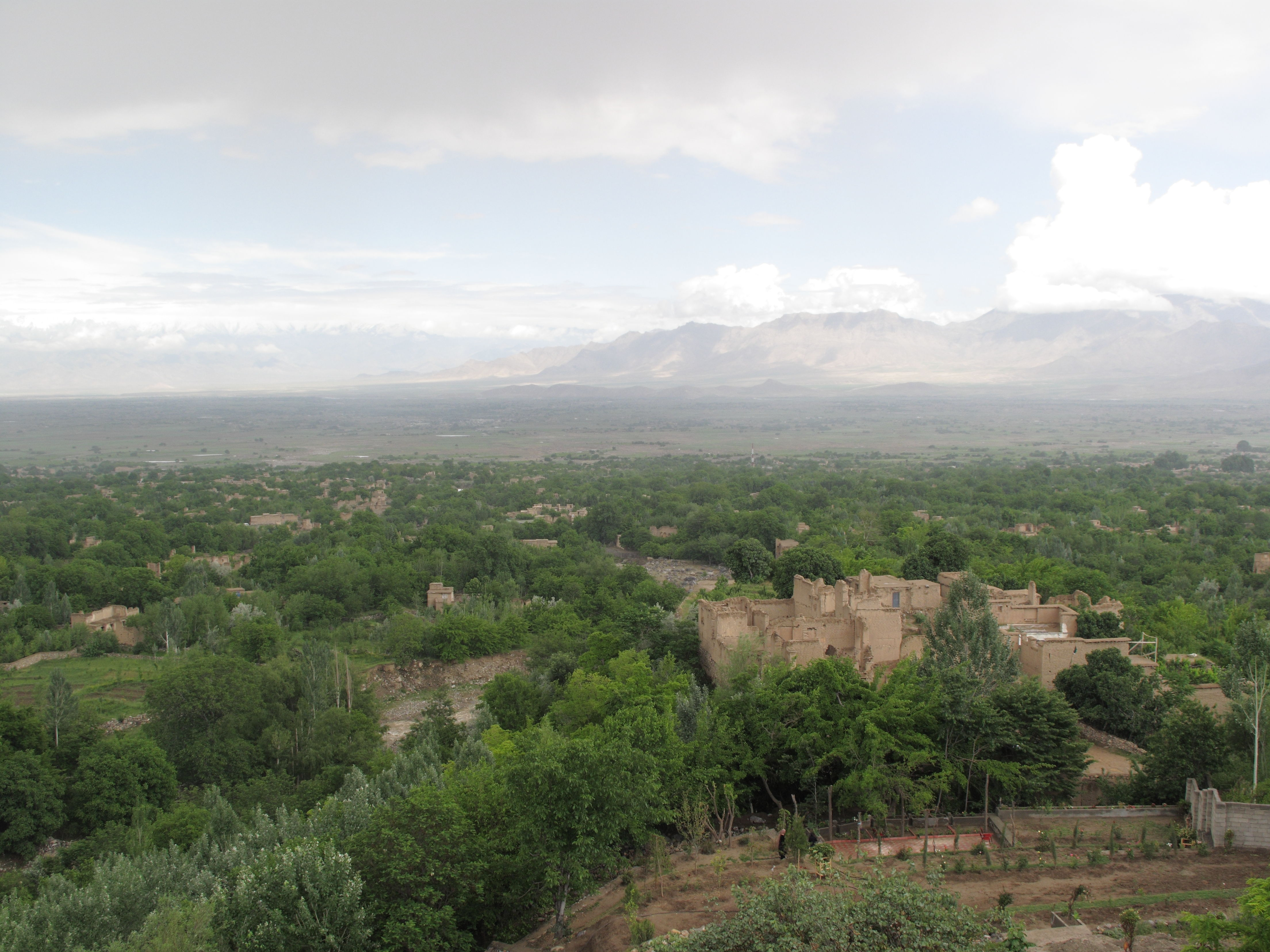
Shamali Plain from the Istalif Village Road, Kabul Province, Afghanistan.

The Shomali Plain, also called the Shomali Valley, is a plateau just north of Kabul, Afghanistan. It is approximately 30 km wide and 80 km long. Shomali means 'windy' or 'northern' (i.e. north of Kabul). Most of the population is Tajik and some Pashtuns. Charikar, Qarabagh, Istalif, and Bagram are among the settlements located within the Shomali Plain. It is a fertile agricultural region where a variety of fruits and vegetables are cultivated, and it is also a popular weekend recreation area for residents of Kabul." The area is known for agriculture including grapes, walnuts, apricots, mulberries, pomegranates, and sour cherries. The village of Istalif is especially famous for its deep turquoise and green pottery.

== History ==
Throughout history, because of its geographic location and proximity to Kabul, the Shomali Plain has experienced numerous periods of fighting and violence. Alexander the Great built forts in today's Bagram, then called Alexandria in the Caucasus. The region played an important role and was often battleground during the First Anglo-Afghan War, civil wars, the Soviet Union, and the United States. Today, the area is still affected by wars in Afghanistan since 1978. The UN Mine Action Center once identified the Shomali Plain as one of the areas in the world most contaminated by land mines.

In the 1920s, the Shomali Plain became a focal point of tension following Habibullāh Kalakāni overthrowing Amanullah Khan, the King of Afghanistan. Most of the people of Shomali supported Habibullah, who hailed from the village of Kalakan. Civil war followed Habibullah's uprising and fighting ensued in Istalif in 1929. Eventually, Mohammad Nadir Shah, a General under Amanullah Khan, became king. In retribution and because he was beholden to the Pashtun tribes who supported him, Mohammad Nadir Shah gave them permission to raid and loot the Shomali Plain.

=== Taliban rule (1996-2001) ===
During the rule of the Taliban (1996-2001), fighting in the Shomali Plain was relatively sparse. Despite this, the plateaus were utilized as a potential fighting frontier by Ahmad Shah Massoud and the Northern Alliance who challenged the Taliban's control over much of Afghanistan.

When the Taliban retreated from the Plain in 1997, they poisoned wells, cut down trees, and destroyed the irrigation system. The area was ethnically Tajik in support of Ahmad Shah Massoud. In 1999, the Taliban considered the region, especially towns such as Istalif with 45,000 residents, a liability and they razed such towns, destroyed farms, and forced hundreds of thousands of people from the region. The Taliban's goal was not only to demolish the region's farming and livelihood, but to depopulate it as well.

=== 2001 ===
In 2001, sporadic clashes took place at Shomali Plain between the Taliban and the Northern Alliance. The Taliban forces, fearing encirclement, suffering US airstrikes, and poor morale as a result of the fall of several northern cities prior, would retreat to Kabul 45 kilometres north abandoning the city a day later.

=== Rebuilding since 2002 ===
In the opening phases of the War in Afghanistan, the Northern Alliance was directed to take the Shomali Plain after having securing the northern supply routes prior. They were instructed to wait for an international peacekeeping force to move into Kabul however, due to the Taliban retreat from Kabul, a power vacuum was left in Kabul and the Northern Alliance moved rapidly to fill it consequently, occupying Kabul with minimal resistance.

In the summer of 2002, as the Taliban were being driven from Northern Afghanistan, villagers began to return to the Shomali Plain, rebuilding homes and tending to their farms. By late 2002, the Shomali Plain still resembled a devastated battleground, with few trees or shrubs remaining.

By 2004, the United Nations High Commissioner for Refugees had put in 300 water points and resettled 14,000 families.

By 2009, the Shomali Plain had become one of the relatively few prospering areas of Afghanistan. The A76 highway, running through the Shomali Plain, is militarily necessary, having been rebuilt by 2009 and guarded heavily. That A76 runs from Kabul to Bagram and Charikar in Parwan Province, and then into the Hindu Kush mountains to the Salang Tunnel. The tunnel provides the only year-round, all-weather access to the north of Afghanistan.
