= Kapisa =

Kapisa, Kapiśa, Kapiśi, Kapesa or Kapissa may refer to:

- modern Kapisa Province of Afghanistan
- the 1st millennium Kingdom of Kapisa
- the city of Kapisi (or Kapisa), located near modern Bagram
- Hanuman, a Hindu deity, also known as Kapisa
