= Chindawol uprising =

1979 failed insurrection in Kabul, Afghanistan

1979 Chindawol uprising
- Part of the 1979 uprisings in Afghanistan
- Kabul (Afghanistan)
Date	23 June – 2 July 1979
Location	Chindawol, Kabul, Afghanistan
Result	Afghan government victory: Followed by a massacre

Belligerents
DRA; Afghan Army; Police; Afghan Air Force	Shias residents of Chindawol

Commanders and leaders
Nur Muhammad Taraki; Hafizullah Amin	No centralized leadership

Casualties and losses
Unknown	Around 10,000 arrested and executed

The Chindawol uprising was a failed insurrection that took place on June 23, 1979 in the Chindawol district in the old city of Kabul, Afghanistan. The rebellion was started by the arrests of Shia scholars and influential fighters of the city's of Qizilbash by the ruling Khalq-PDPA government. Chindawol is predominantly populated by these communities. The protests escalated when residents attacked and held a police station that day, marching on the streets and on Joda-i Maiwand whilst shouting religious and anti-government slogans. Several thousands took part. The government brutally cracked down on them in a four-hour battle, using Mil Mi-24 helicopters and tanks. around 12,000 Qizilbash and Hazaras were arrested and 4,785 immediately executed.

It was the first popular uprising of 1979 that occurred in Kabul.

== See also ==
- List of uprisings in Afghanistan
