= Panjshir University =

- د پنجشېر پوهنتون پوهنتون پنجشیر
- Location: Panjshir province, Afghanistan

Panjshir University (Note: Pashto: د پنجشېر پوهنتون Dari: پوهنتون پنجشیر) is a university located in Panjshir province, northern Afghanistan. Panjshir university has faculties of Economics, Agriculture and Education.

Departments of Faculty of Education:

- Biology
- Chemistry
- Maths
- Physics
- English
- Pashto

The Faculty of Islamic Studies

*    Jurisprudence and Principles of Islamic Jurisprudence

- . Preaching of Islam and Islamic Culture.

== See also ==
- List of universities in Afghanistan
