= Bala Hissar, Kabul =

Fortress in Kabul, Afghanistan

Coordinates: 34°30′20″N 69°11′30″E

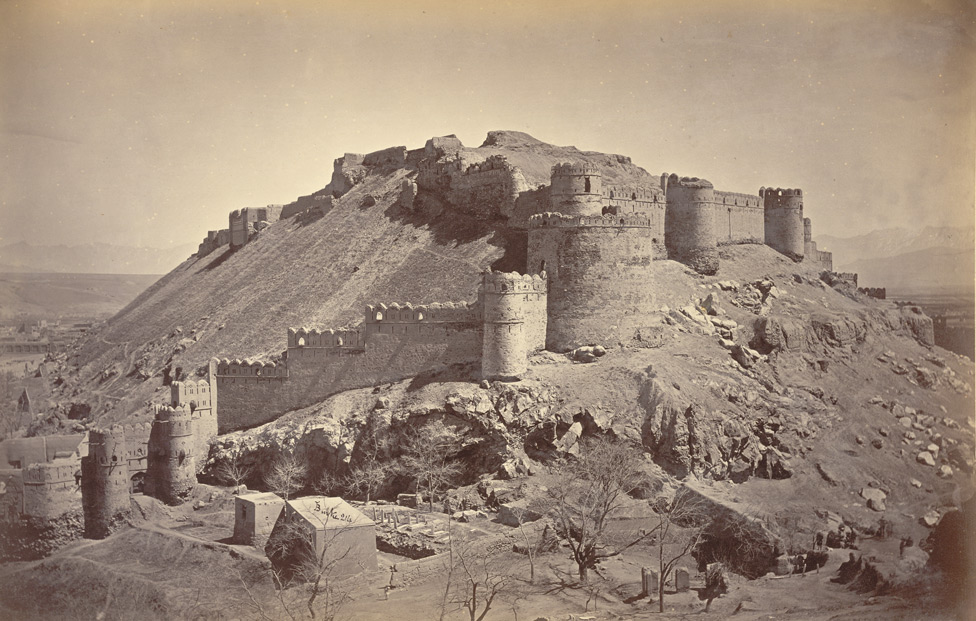
Upper Bala Hissar from west Kabul in 1879

Bala Hissar (Note: Pashto: بالا حصار Dari: بالا حصار) (lit. 'High Fort') is a ruined fortress located in the south of the old city of Kabul, Afghanistan. While there is minimal evidence on its history, it is suggested that a citadel of some form had existed by the 5th century AD on the present site. After coming into neglect in the 18th century, the Durranis reoccupied the fort. The British levelled many sections of the fortress, however some structures still remain and a project is planned to reconstruct the site into an archeaological park.

The fortress sits to the south of the modern city centre at the tail end of the Kuh-e-Shēr Darwāzah (lion door) mountain. The curtain walls, which are 20 feet (6.1 m) high and 12 feet (3.7 m) thick, start at the fortress and follow the mountain ridge in a sweeping curve down to the river. It sports a set of gates for access to the fortress. The Kōh-e Shēr Darwāzah mountain is behind the fort. Bala Hissar was originally divided into two parts: the lower fortress, containing the stables, barracks and three royal palaces, and the upper fortress (the actual fort with the name Bala Hissar) housing the armory and the dungeon.

== History ==
Shah Shujah Durrani, the last ruler of the Durrani Empire, sitting at his court inside the Bala Hissar

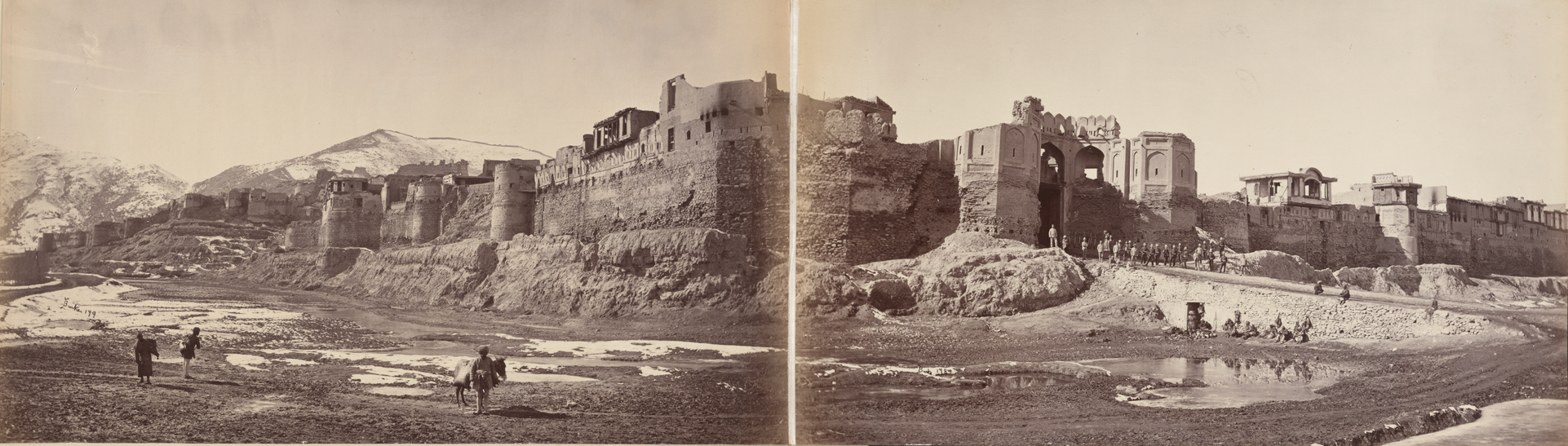
Bala Hissar from an album compiled during the Second Anglo-Afghan War in 1878-1880.

The origins of the Bala Hissar fortress are obscure. Pre-Kushan pottery as well as Indo-Greek and Achaemenid coins have been recovered in its vicinity, indicating settlements in the area from at least the 6th century CE. Usage of the site as a citadel has been dated to a period as early as the 5th century; however, minimal evidence exists regarding its precise history.

Evidence of notable activity at the site begins with the Mughals. The fortress was besieged and conquered by Babur, the founder of the Mughal Empire, in 1504. After Akbar succeeded his father and consolidated his rule over Kabul, the Bala Hissar became the primary residence of the subahdar (governor) of Kabul Subah. The outer walls of the fortress were strengthened and the area of the site expanded. Emperor Jahangir demolished several structures within the fortress and built new palaces, audience halls, and a charbagh. His son and successor Shah Jahan, prior to his accession, built himself quarters within the fortress that earned the admiration of Jahangir. As emperor, Shah Jahan later resided in the Bala Hissar during his campaigns in Central Asia. Aurangzeb, Shah Jahan's successor, built a mosque within the fortress. Under the Mughals, the site developed into a notable palace-fortress, comparable in size to those at the Mughal capitals of Agra and Lahore.

After the Mughals lost Kabul, the fortress went into neglect, passing into the hands of Persians and the Durranis, until Timur Shah Durrani came to power in 1773. Upon shifting the Durrani capital to Kabul, Timur occupied the fortress and rebuilt a palace within, and used the upper part of the fortress as a state prison and arsenal. His successor Shah Shuja Durrani further developed the fortress. The structures erected by the Durranis replaced many earlier Mughal constructions.

As Kabul's principal fortress, Bala Hissar was the stage for several pivotal events in both the First (1838–1842) and Second Anglo-Afghan Wars (1878–1880). The British envoy to Kabul, Sir Pierre Louis Napoleon Cavagnari, was murdered inside the fort in September 1879 triggering a general uprising and the second phase of the Second Anglo-Afghan War. It was damaged during the Second Anglo-Afghan War when the British Residency was burned down, then later when the armoury exploded. British Army officer Frederick Roberts had wanted to demolish the fortress completely, but in the end it was strengthened and fortified in the Spring of 1880, a few months before the British left Afghanistan. Roberts ordered the levelling of several Mughal and Durrani-era structures in the fortress, and consequently very little of their architectural contributions remain.

The fortress ceased to serve any imperial functions when it was completely abandoned in the 1890s.

=== 20th century ===
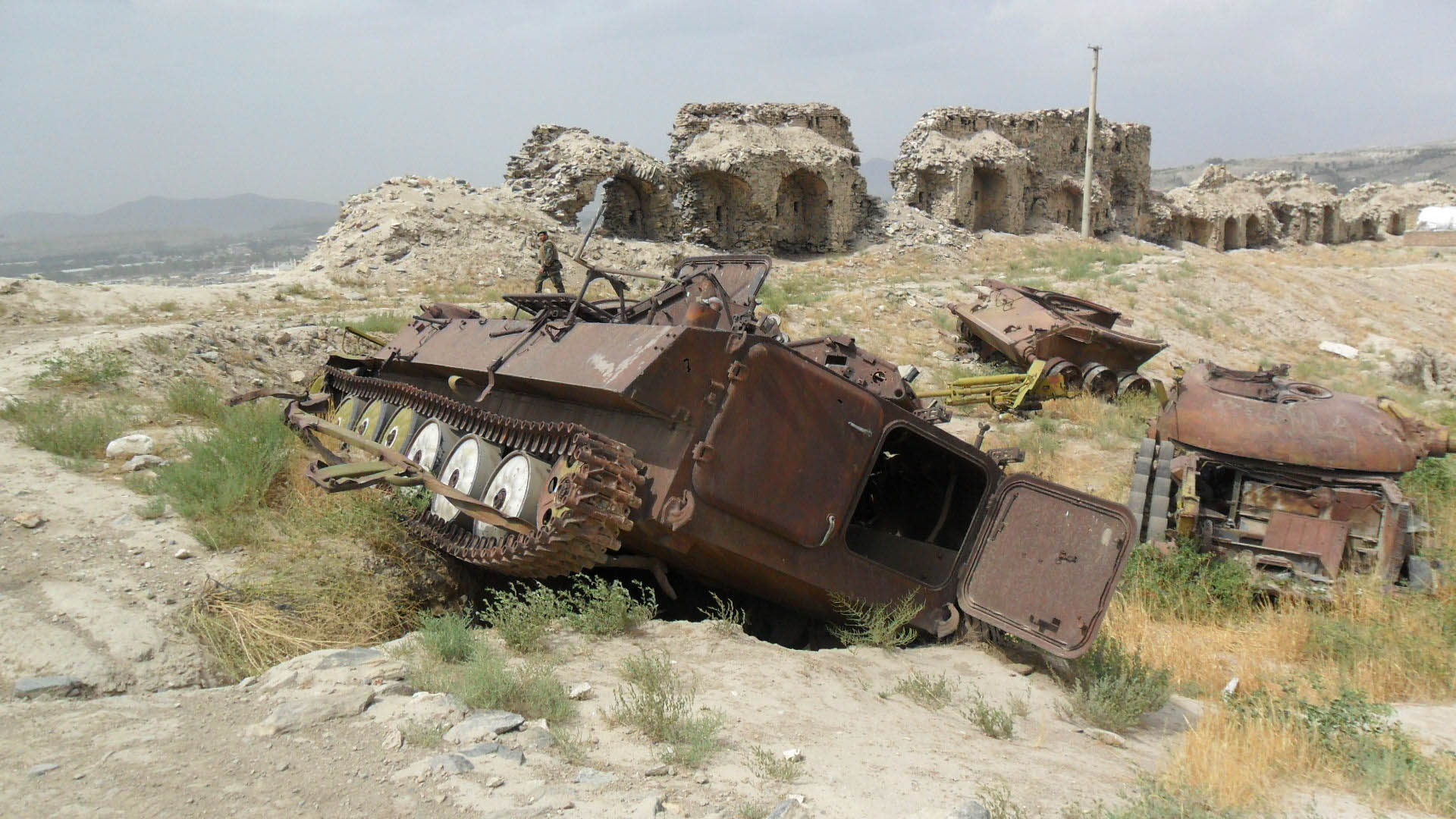
Bala Hissar top view with war wreckage

On August 5, 1979, the Bala Hissar uprising was organized by anti-government groups, but it was suppressed within hours and tens of people were arrested and executed by government forces.

Bala Hissar once again became the focal point of conflict between factions during the Afghan civil war in 1994, between the forces of Ahmad Shah Massoud and Gulbuddin Hekmatyar. Much of the fortress was damaged as a result.

Before the Taliban takeover it was manned by the 55th Division of the Afghan National Army and one can see the remnants of tanks and heavy weapons positioned on the fortress remains overlooking Kabul.

=== Bala Hissar today ===
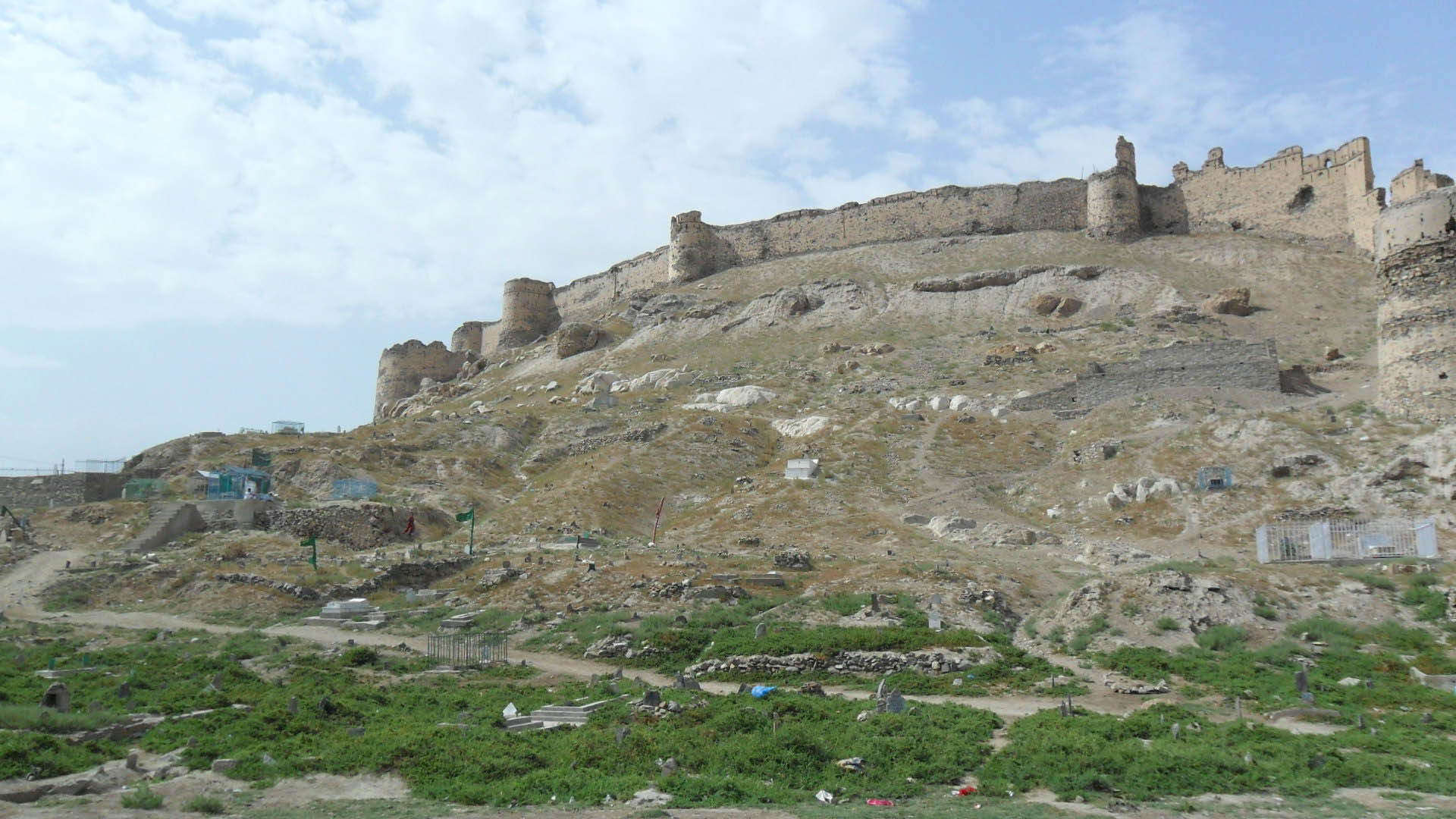
Bala Hissar and cemetery below

When looking at the outer wall of the main fortress, it is possible to see layers of building materials from years of destruction and re-fortification. The tanks and other war wreckage from the last 30 years are strewn about the top of the hillside. Much of the hillside is built up on tunnels and underground storage. Evidence of trenches from previous trench warfare encircles the upper most level of the hilltop, which is adorned with an Afghan flag. Wild dogs roam all over the hillside and a company from the Afghan Army is posted at the site. U.S. military and civilians occupied a site below the fortress during Operation Enduring Freedom. The occupants were warned when going up to the castle, to stay on the heavily used paths to avoid mines laid during the Soviet occupation.

On 2 February 2021, the Afghan Acting Minister of Information and Culture, Mohammad Tahir Zuhair, signed a Memorandum of Understanding with the Aga Khan Trust for Culture (an agency of the Aga Khan Development Network) on the reconstructing and consolidation of the walls and the structure, as well as to establish an archeological park at the site. India has pledged approximately $1 million to the project.
