= Progressive Youth Organization =

Progressive Youth Organization (Afghanistan) was an anti-revisionist Marxist–Leninist organization in Afghanistan. The organization emerged from the New Democratic Current (Jerian-e Demokratik-e Navin), a leftist movement that had been established by Abdulrahim Mahmudi, Abdulhadi Mahmudi, Akram Yari and Seddiq Yari. The New Democratic Current founded the PYO in October 1965. The group brought out the publication Shalleh-ye Javid ('Eternal Flame'), and its followers were generally known as sholayes. PYO never made its existence or name known to the public. PYO was dissolved in 1972.
