= Liberation Organization of the People of Afghanistan =

Afghan maoist resistance

- سازمان آزادی‌بخش مردم افغانستان
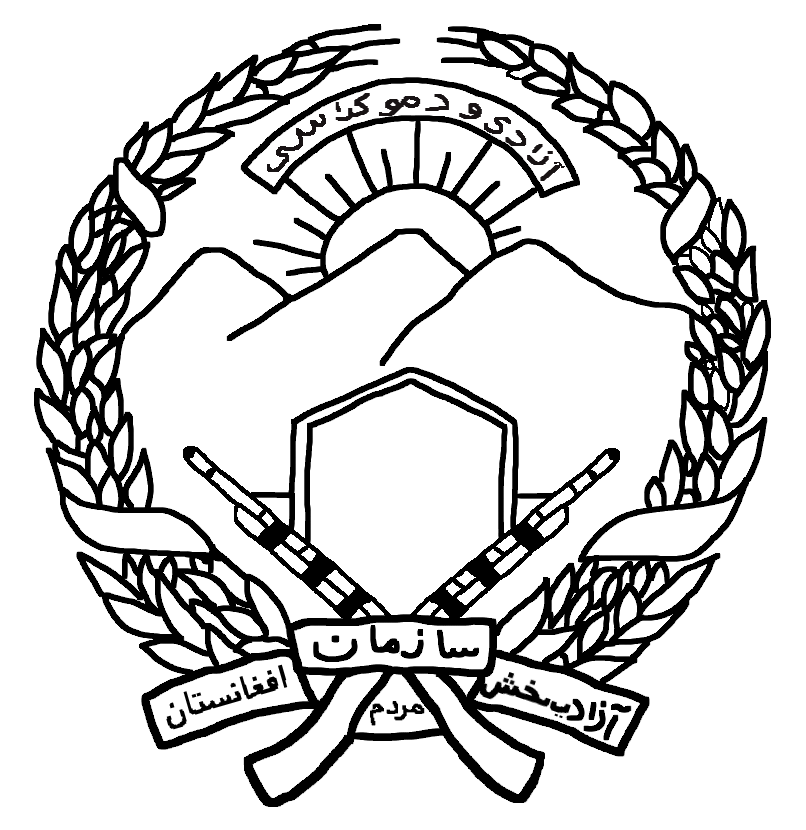
- Leader: Majid Kalakani
- Dates active: 1977–1989
- Split from: Afghanistan Liberation Organization
- Ideology: Communism; Marxism–Leninism–Maoism
- Political position: Far-left
- Part of: Revolutionary Internationalist Movement

The Liberation Organization of the People of Afghanistan (Dari: سازمان آزادی‌بخش مردم افغانستان, Sazman-e Azadibakhsh-e Mardom-e Afghanistan, SAMA) was a Maoist insurgent group operating in Afghanistan, based in Parwan Province. It was the main leftist politico-military organization in Afghanistan that fought in opposition to the Democratic Republic of Afghanistan regime and the Soviets. SAMA was led by Majid Kalakani, who intended to turn SAMA into a Maoist styled United Front of forces opposed to the Soviet-backed PDPA.

SAMA was a Marxist–Leninist–Maoist group with links to the Revolutionary Internationalist Movement. Although not all of its members were Maoists, it rejected the Three Worlds Theory in opposition to Faiz Ahmad's ALO. SAMA had its origins in the Shola-e Javid Maoist movement of the 1960s and 1970s. SAMA itself was mainly created after a disagreement with Faiz Ahmad. Majid abandoned the ALO and proceeded to found his own Maoist group, SAMA.

After Kalakani's death SAMA stagnated and declined. Fighting between SAMA and Hekmatyar's Party of Islam had driven SAMA out of Kalakan and Koh Daman by 1983. By 1983 government forces had infiltrated the SAMA organization and attempted to encourage SAMA to join the government. When this did not occur the government arrested 60 of the organization's leaders. The new SAMA leadership entered into discussions with government and begun to abandon Maoism and its strategy for New Democracy, causing splits and desertions, as well as the emergence of new Maoist groups. By 1989 the organization ceased to exist.
