= Afghanistan Liberation Organization =

Afghanistan Liberation Organization د افغانستان د ازادۍ سازمان
- Abbreviation: ALO
- Founder: Faiz Ahmad
- Founded: 1973
- Preceded by: Progressive Youth Organization
- Ideology: Communism; Maoism
- Political position: Far-left

Party flag

Website
- Current: http://rehayi.org/alo/en/ Defunct: http://maoism.ru/alo/

The Afghanistan Liberation Organization (ALO; Pashto: د افغانستان د ازادۍ سازمان, romanized: Da Āfġānistān Azadi Sāzmān) is a Maoist political group in Afghanistan. It was founded by Faiz Ahmad and some others in 1973. ALO, which was originally named Revolutionary Group of the Peoples of Afghanistan (RGPA; Pashto: د افغانستان د خلکو انقلابي ډله, romanized: Da Āfġānistān De Khalqo Inḳilābī Dahla); is one of several organizations that grew out of the Shola-e Javid (Dari: شعلهٔ جاوید, romanized: Šoʿle-ye Jāvid, lit. 'Eternal Flame') movement.

== History ==
On April 27, 1978, military officers loyal to the PDPA launched an uprising on the orders of Hafizullah Amin in what would become known as the Saur Revolution. Despite bringing the Communist Khalqists into power, many smaller socialist groups rejected the Khalqists' rule for various reasons, including the Pashtun hegemony of the new government, mistreatment of ethnic minorities, and their Soviet influence. On August 5, 1979, a united front of anti-Khalqist Marxists (including the ALO) and moderate Islamists attempted an uprising in southern Kabul. The uprising lasted five hours and was brutally crushed by the Khalqist government's MiG aircraft, artillery, and tanks.

The organization was highly critical of the Soviet–Afghan War and actively fought against what it considered social imperialism. In June 1979, RGPA convened the Mujahedin Freedom Fighters Front of Afghanistan together with Islamist elements, as a united front against the pro-Soviet government. Along with some other Islamist groups, RGPA directed a rebellion in Kabul and other cities on 5 August 1979, that became known as the Bala Hissar uprising. The uprising was suppressed by the government and tens of ALO cadres were killed and arrested. Some of the central committee members like Mohammad Mohsin, Mohammad Dawod and others were executed in the Pul-e-Charkhi prison.

ALO had many fronts against the Soviets and pro-Soviet Afghan communists in different parts of Afghanistan and was attacked by both the Soviet forces and the fundamentalist groups of Mujahideen. They lost over 120 cadres during the war.

Faiz Ahmad himself was assassinated on 12 November 1986, along with 6 other comrades, by the Hizb-e Islami militia of Gulbuddin Hekmatyar.

The organization still exists as of 2018.
