= Shola-e Javid =

Shola-e Javid شعلهٔ جاوید
- Founded: 1964
- Dissolved: 1969
- Youth wing: Progressive Youth Organization
- Ideology: Communism; Marxism–Leninism; Maoism; Anti-revisionism
- Political position: Far-left
- Colors: Red; Yellow

Party flag

Shola-e Javid (Dari: شعلهٔ جاوید, romanized: Šoʿle-ye Jāvid, lit. 'The eternal flame') was an anti-revisionist Marxist–Leninist communist party founded around 1964 in the Kingdom of Afghanistan by Abdul Rahim Mahmudi. Its strategy was Maoist and populist, gaining support from university students, professionals, the majority Pashtuns and the Hazaras. Its popularity grew significantly throughout the late 1960s and into the 1970s, possibly eclipsing that of the Parcham and Khalq factions of the pro-Soviet People's Democratic Party of Afghanistan (PDPA) up until the factions' reconciliation in 1977. The Shola-e Javid party was outlawed in 1969 after criticizing King Zahir Shah.

== Formation ==
In October 1965, the Progressive Youth Organisation was founded from the New Democratic Current (Jerian-e Demokratik-e Navin) by Akram Yari, Seddiq Yari, Abdul Rahim Mahmudi and Abdul Hadi Mahmudi, their official publication being referred to as Shola-e Javid and their followers being colloquially known as Sholayis (‘Flamers’). The publication was in circulation from April 1968 to July 1969, being widely known in public as the name of the party itself. The original founder of the publication was Abdul Rahman Mahmudi, who was the brother of the late Abdul Rahman Mahmudi, a renowned progressive revolutionary figure and an intellectual successor to the esteemed Afghan historian and reformist Ghulam Mohammad Ghubar.

An Afghan publication titled “The Identity of Political Parties of Afghanistan” by Basir Ahmad Dawlatbadi provides an introduction to Shola-e Jawid, citing an excerpt from the “Torch of Liberty” newspaper from the Liberty Organisation of Afghanistan which reads: “Following the exposure of internal divisions within the international leftist movement in 1963, and the subsequent formation of the People’s Democratic Party of Afghanistan, the first core of the Progressive Youth Organisation rose in opposition to modern revisionism and its theoretical framework. In response, a number of independent-minded leftists, along with remnants of Niday-e Khalq (Voice of the People), established the Progressive Youth Organisation in October 1965”.

The Progressive Youth Organization actively opposed the People's Democratic Party of Afghanistan, labelling them as a revisionist party, their campaign being organised in such a way that “the campaign against the contemporary revisionism was set at the centre of their agenda”.

== See also ==
- Akram Yari
- Faiz Ahmad
- List of anti-revisionist groups
