= Shewaki =

Shewaki شيوکى
- Village
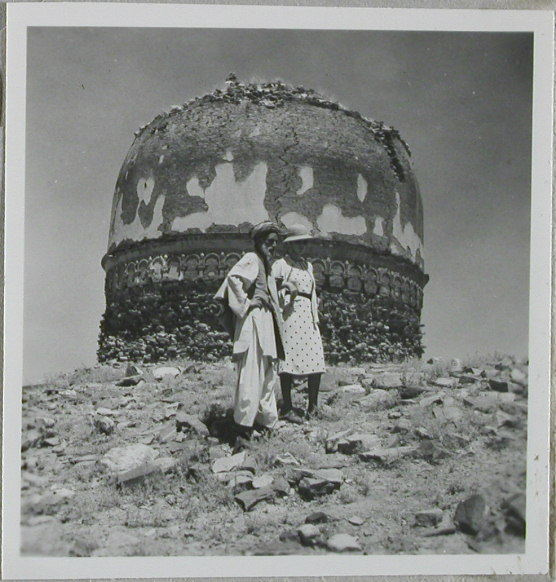
- Shewaki Stupa, 1939

- Location in Afghanistan
- Coordinates: 34°27′N 69°13′E
- Country: Afghanistan
- Province: Kabul Province
- District: Bagrami
- Elevation: 1,798 m (5,899 ft)

Shewaki (Dari: شيوکى) is a village located in the Hindaki area of Afghanistan, in Bagrami District, Kabul Province, near the mountains Koh e Hindaki and Munar e Chakari (not related to Chakari, Afghanistan).

== Shewaki Stupa ==
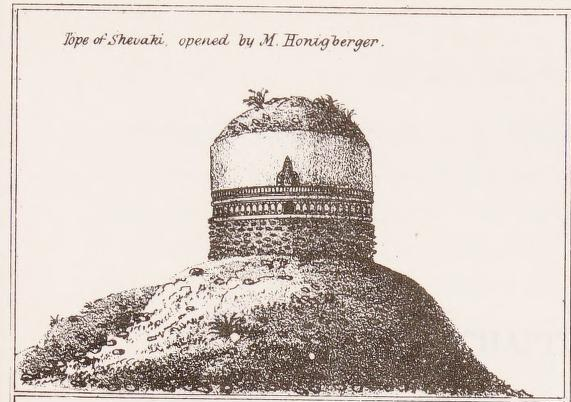
Tope of Shewaki, sketch by Charles Masson (1833)

Shewaki Stupa is the site of Shahbahar (King's Vihara), one of Afghanistan’s major Buddhist site. This pre Islamic Buddhist stupa was built during the Kushan period between the 1st and 3rd centuries CE. ‘Shiva’, the popular deity among Hindu worshippers most presumably got its name from here as a Shiva Lingam. In 2022, the reconstruction of Shewaki Stupa was completed. The restoration work took two and a half years and cost more than $80,000.
