= Farza District =

- District
- Interactive map of Farza District
- Country: Afghanistan
- Province: Kabul Province
- Capital: Dehnawe Farza

Population (2015)
  - Total: 21,961
- Time zone: UTC+04:30 (AST)

Farza District, also referred to as Farza, is district of Kabul Province, Afghanistan, with a population of 18,000 people. It is located 45 km (28 miles) north of Kabul, in the hills of the northwestern part of the Shomali Plain, and south of the villages of Istalif and Qarabagh. Farza District contains eighteen villages. The district headquarters is Dehnawe Farza. According to the UNHCR, in 2002, the population consisted of a mixture of Pashtuns and Tajiks.

A river runs through Farza, called Darya-e Farza (Farza River). Farza is home to orchards and well-known for its fruits, including grapes, mulberries, walnuts, and pomegranates. Agriculture is the primary source of income.

Two hundred years ago, the people of Farza had a kingdom lifestyle. The center of Farza is called Qala Mera, which was made by Sayed Baabshah. Sayed's people had strong rules and they were peaceful people. Charles Masson visited Farza as part of his travels in Afghanistan just before the First Anglo-Afghan War. In Farza, he found villages, castles, shrines, and a waterfall.

"The taluk I found, comprised twelve villages and four castles. The two principal villages, inhabited by Tajiks, contained but eighty houses each, and the remainder varied from thirty to seventy houses. The aggregate of villages and castles embraced about seven hundred houses, consequently a population of nearly four thousand souls may be assigned to the taluk of Ferzah" (Vol III, pp. 117-119).

In January 1991, Farza was separated as an independent district from Mir Bacha Kot District but this structure was never recognized by the Taliban government.

Like the rest of the Shomali Plain, residents of Farza suffered under the first rule of the Taliban for their support of the Northern Alliance led by Ahmad Shah Massoud. In 1999, the Taliban forced residents to leave their homes, cut down their trees and vegetation, and burned villagers' homes. Around 4,5000 to 5,000 families fled to surrounding cities including Kabul and Jalalabad.
