= Koh e Hindaki =

- (Dari: کوه هندکی)
- Location within Afghanistan

Highest point
- Elevation: 2,199 m (7,215 ft)
- Parent peak: Hindu Kush
- Coordinates: 34°27′26.7″N 69°11′30″E

Geography
- Location: Bagrami District, Kabul Province
- Parent range: Hindu Kush

Koh e Hindaki (Dari: کوه هندکی) is a mountain of the Hindu Kush. It is located near Bagrami District in Kabul Province.
