= Chakari, Afghanistan =

Chakari
- Location in Afghanistan
- Coordinates: 34°20′6″N 69°26′24″E
- Country: Afghanistan
- Province: Kabul Province
- District: Khaki Jabbar District
- Elevation: 7,730 ft (2,356 m)
- Time zone: UTC+4:30

Chakari (Cakaray, Chakaray) was a village in Khaki Jabbar District, Kabul Province, Afghanistan. During the Afghan Civil War in the 1990s, large portions of the village were destroyed, and many people left. As of 2002, many of the former inhabitants had not returned.

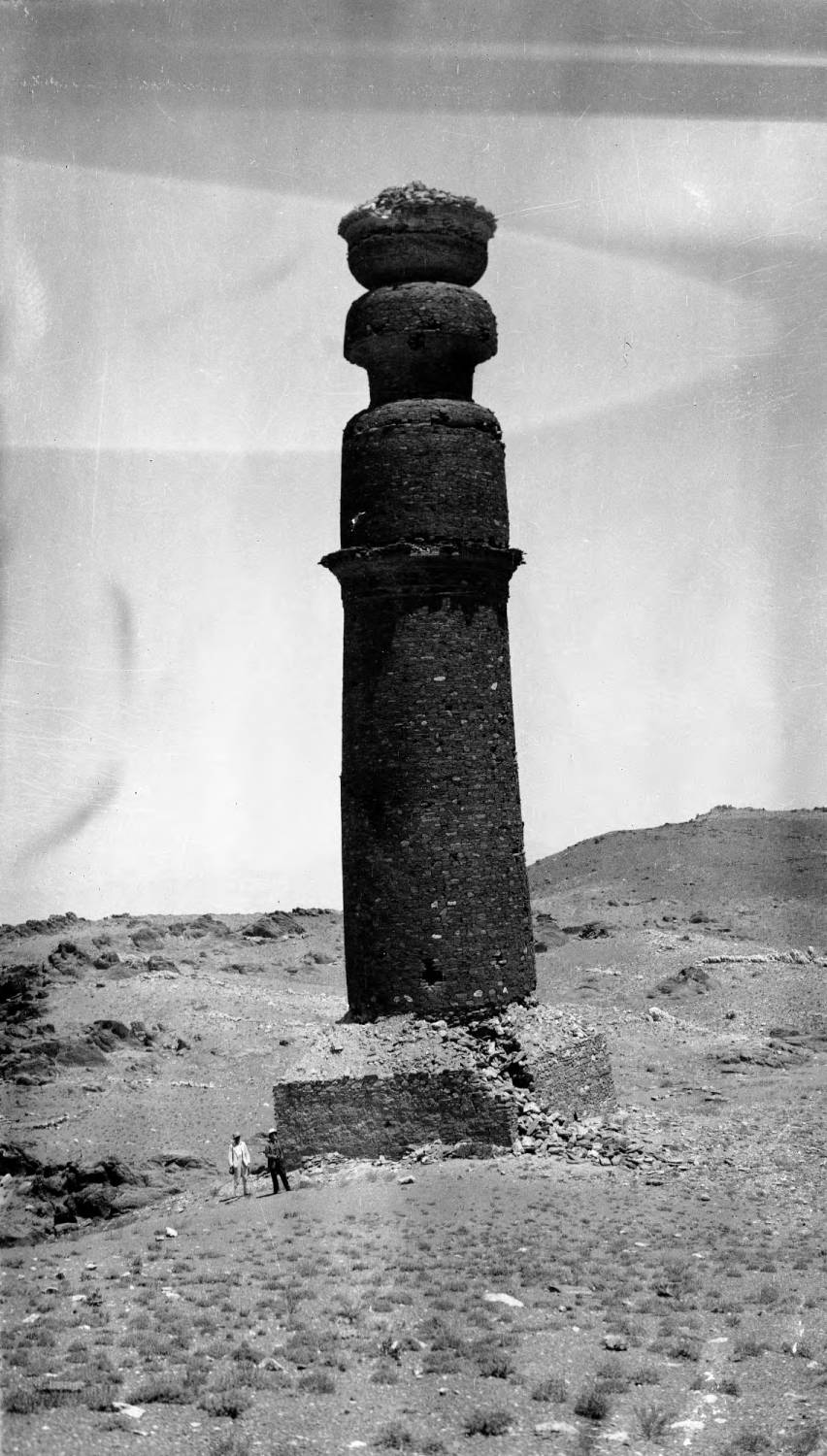
Minaret of Chakari, 1936

A Buddhist pillar, known as the "Minaret of Chakari" was located there, and appears to have given the village its name. It was built in the 1st century AD. The pillar was heavily damaged during the Afghan Civil War, and was subsequently destroyed by the hardline Taliban regime in March 1998.

In the 20th century, the inhabitants of the village were known for their expertise in breeding mules.

== See also ==
- Kabul Province
