= Guldara District =

- District
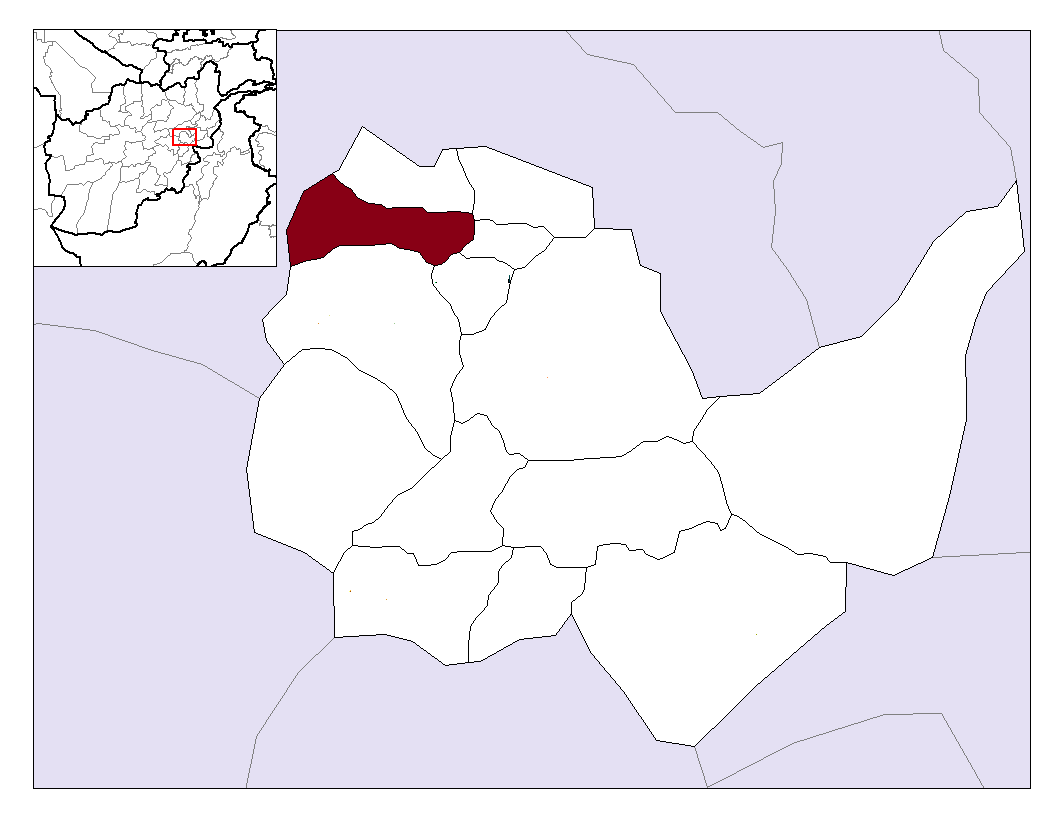
- Location in Kabul Province
- Country: Afghanistan
- Province: Kabul Province
- Capital: Guldara

Population (2015)
  - Total: 23,402
- Time zone: UTC+04:30 (AST)

Guldara District is located in the northwestern part of Kabul Province, Afghanistan. It has a population of 25,213 people, including new returnees from Iran and Pakistan who had fled there during various stages of conflict in Afghanistan (2006 official UNDP est.). Around 45% are Tajiks and 55% Pashtuns.

Guldara district borders Parvan Province to the west, Farza District to the north, Qarabagh, Kalakan and Mir Bacha Kot districts to the east, and Shakardara District to the south. Its headquarters is Guldara, which is a village in the northeastern part of the district; the district itself comprises 45 villages. Guldara District was part of Shakardara District until Burhanuddin Rabbani's government. Almost the whole district was destroyed during the civil war and the main villages near the main road to Kabul are destroyed. It is small district with isolated villages.

However, since 2001 grate progress has taken place, mainly in infrastructure and basic amenities. Over the last few years, the Government has shown increasing commitment to make its development interventions more effective, enduring, equitable and responsive to the needs and priorities of communities at the district level. Agricultural and livestock productions are low in Guldara District due to lack of agricultural mechanization system, inadequate agricultural water and spread of animal and plant diseases. Destruction or lack of roads has created transportation problems and has raised food and other required materials prices, similarly, inaccessibility to professional physicians, adequate health centres and quality medicines have increased health problems. Thus, the number of existing schools is inadequate, the distance between schools and student's house is quite long and the schools luck buildings, which the students study in open places and occasionally cause them sickness. Moreover, unemployment rate is high and a great number of residents immigrate to neighbouring countries to find jobs or they become drug dependent inside the country. Instability and insecurity rate increase due to lack of police, national army and experienced personnel in security departments. Based on the above-mentioned issues, weak economy and poverty has been considered as the main problem of the people.
