= Tarakhel (tribe) =

Pashtun nomadic sub-tribe

Torakhel/Tarakhel
تره‌خېل(Pashto)

Regions with significant populations
- Kabul, Laghman, and Baghlan

Languages
- Pashto (Native)

Religion
- Sunni Islam

The Tarakhel, or Torakhel (Pashto:توره خیل), are a Pashtun sub-tribe of the Ghilji tribe. They can trace their origins back to Kochi nomadic Pashtuns from Zabul. The name 'Tarakhel' originally comes from the word Tora which means sword in Pashto and 'khel' is the suffix for Pashtun tribes. Therefore, the name of this tribe in the Pashtun literature is 'Torakhail' which is translated to the clan of swords or the clan of swordsmen. The people of Tarakhel are divided into two parts in Kabul, the main tribe which resides in Deh Sabz District district of Kabul and the nomad Tarakhelis who are residing in 'Pol-e Charkhi' area of Kabul. They are mainly found in the Deh Sabz district of Kabul and Laghman but also in parts of northern Afghanistan, such as Baghlan and Samangan.

== History ==
The Tarakhel Pashtuns are originally nomadic Kuchis, even today there are still nomadic Tarakhels in Deh Sabz. Before becoming sedentary they were pending between Arghandab in Zabul and Deh Sabz in northeastern Kabul. It was during the Mughal period when Kabul's importance in the region was rapidly increasing, in that period a big chunk of the Tarakhels settled in the province of Kabul and became sedentary. They have participated in the expeditions of Shah Mahmud Hotaki towards Persia, when he first besieged and after captured Isfahan from Sultan Husayn. The settling in northern Afghanistan likely happened during Abdur Rahman Khans reign.

Abdur Rahman Khan, who came to power in 1880, pursued a deliberate policy of Pashtun settlement in northern Afghanistan known as Pashtunization, relocating Ghilzai Pashtun Kuchi nomads and farmers from the eastern provinces to Afghan Turkestan as part of a broader strategy to consolidate central authority over non Pashtun regions and buffer the frontier with the Russian Empire. Both Durrani and Ghilzai Pashtun communities were resettled in areas including present day Baghlan and Samangan during this period, with settlers granted land confiscated from Persian-speaking non Pashtun inhabitants. The Tarakhel, as Ghilzai Kuchis from the Kabul region, were part of the broader wave of Ghilzai resettlement that populated the northern provinces during and after Abdur Rahman's reign.

According to Local elders of Tarakhel, the founding father of Tarakhel was a swordsman and kingsman named 'Pacha Baba' (پاچا بابا) who fought alongside the founding father of modern day Afghanistan, Ahmad Shah Durrani, in many battles and he was gifted and honoured with the sword of the Ahmad Shah Durrani, by the King himself, thus comes the name 'Torakhel' the clan of the swordsmen. The current tribe of Tarakhel in Kabul is further divided into many sub-tribes, one of the major tribe which is a direct descendent of 'Pacha Baba' and are known as PachaaKhel (Pashto: پاچاخیل). With time, other sub-tribes from different regions settled in today's tarakhel in Deh Sabz District district of Kabul. The people of Tarakhel, are traced back to the Ghilji confederacy of the Pashtun people.

== Notable Figures ==
- Mawlawi Sayd Agha Tarkahel
- Naveen-ul-Haq
- Wafiullah Tarakhel

== See also ==
- Pashtun people
- Ghiljis
- Pashtun colonization of northern Afghanistan
- Pashtun tribes
