= Tarakhel, Deh Sabz District =

Tara Khēl
- Location in Afghanistan
- Coordinates: 34°34′36″N 69°15′23″E
- Country: Afghanistan
- Province: Kabul Province
- District: Dih Sabz District
- Elevation: 5,886 ft (1,794 m)
- Time zone: UTC+4:30

Tara Khēl is a village and the center of Deh Sabz District, Kabul Province, Afghanistan. It is situated northwest of Kabul at 34.5767°N 69.2564°E at 1794 m altitude. The village has more than 2,000 households. It is close to the Kabul International Airport. The Tarakhelis, a Pashtun tribe, are the main inhabitants of the village, thus the name Tarakhel.

== See also ==
- Kabul Province
