= Mir Bacha Kot =

Mir Bacha Kot Saraai Khwaja
- Location in Afghanistan
- Coordinates: 34°44′48″N 69°6′59″E
- Country: Afghanistan
- Province: Kabul Province
- District: Mir Bacha Kot District
- Elevation: 5,540 ft (1,690 m)
- Time zone: UTC+4:30

Mir Bacha Kot is a village and a market in the center of Mir Bacha Kot District, Kabul Province, Afghanistan. It is located at 34.7467°N 69.1164°E at 1,690 m altitude, 25 km north of Kabul. The village infrastructure was destroyed during the war. The name “Mir Bacha Kot” was given after the well known Sadat “Ghazi Mir Bacha Khan Kohdamani” a well known military commander who led the Tajiks of Shamali (North of Kabul) against the British in the second Anglo-Afghan war. Since Ghazi Mir Bacha Khan Kohdamani is the most important historical figure from Saraai Khwaja(old name of Mir Bacha Kot District), The people of this district decided to rename the district to “Mir Bacha Kot”.

== See also ==
- Kabul Province
