= Guldara =

- Location in Afghanistan
- Coordinates: 34°49′1″N 69°5′16″E
- Country: Afghanistan
- Province: Kabul Province
- Elevation: 5,650 ft (1,722 m)

Population
  - Total: 38,000
- Time zone: UTC+4:30

Guldara (also Gūḏāra, Gudara, or Gowdārah) is a village and the center of Guldara District, Kabul Province, Afghanistan. It is located at 34.8172°N 69.0878°E at 1722 m altitude, 45 km North of Kabul. The village was almost fully destroyed and now is continuing the process of rehabilitation. A new clinic has been opened. A local NGO, Afghan Educational and Rehabilitation Organisation (AERO) is running this clinic which will provide family planning, child and general health services to a population of around 38,000 people.

== See also ==
- Kabul Province
