= Bagrami District =

- District
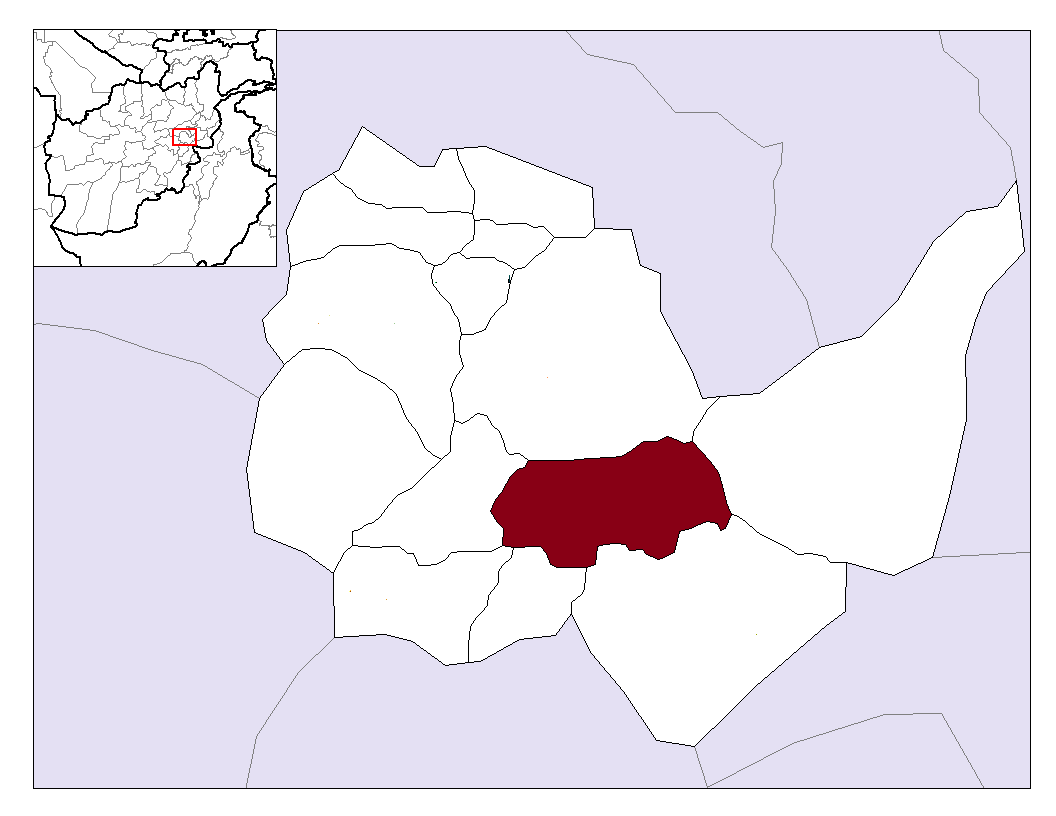
- Location in Kabul Province
- Country: Afghanistan
- Province: Kabul
- Capital: Bagrami

Population (2015)
  - Total: 56,642
- Time zone: UTC+04:30 (AST)

Bagrami District is located in the central part of Kabul Province in Afghanistan. It is approximately a 30-minute drive east from the capital city, Kabul. The district headquarters is the town of Bagrami.

== Demographics ==
The Afghan Ministry of Rural Rehabilitation & Development (MRRD), along with the UNHCR and Central Statistics Office (CSO) of Afghanistan, estimates the population of the district to be around 68,287. According to AIMS and UNHCR, Pashtuns make up the majority of the population, followed by ethnic Tajiks.

== Geography ==
The district borders Kabul to the west, Deh Sabz to the north, Surobi to the east, and Khaki Jabbar, Musayi and Char Asiab districts to the south. Bagrami district is a green area with abundant agricultural activities. Many of its residents work in Kabul because of the two cities' proximity to one another.

== Economy ==
Bagrami district is developing rapidly. The Bagrami Industrial Park, which is part of a major industry in Afghanistan, is part of the rebuilding process. Health care and education are relatively good, and are gradually improving.

== Places of interest ==
- Shewaki

== Famous personalities ==
Famous figures from the Bagrami district ranged from politicians, officers and to businessmen. A famous figure from the Bagrami district was former and highly respected Afghan Parliamentarian Haji Abdul Rasul from the village of Shewaki, who served in the 1960s National Assembly of Afghanistan so called the Wolesi Jirga under the constitutional monarchy of former King Mohammad Zahir Shah. Another famous figure from the Bagrami district was General Shukur Azimi from the village of Shewaki, who served as a three star general under the constitutional monarchy of former King Mohammad Zahir Shah. A famous figure from the Bagrami district was General Ghulam Omar Ulumi from the village of Shewaki, who served as two star general under the constitutional monarchy of former King Mohammad Zahir Shah. Another famous figure from the Bagrami district was former Afghan Communist President Babrak Karmal which was from the village of Kamari. A famous figure from the Bagrami district was Abdul Wakil from the village of Kamari, who served as Afghan Foreign Minister under the Communist government of former president Dr Najibullah Ahmadzai. Another famous figure from the Bagrami district was General Nabi Azimi from the village of Shewaki, who served as Deputy Defense Minister under the Communist government of Dr Najibullah Ahmadzai. A famous figure from the Bagrami district was former Afghan mujaheddin commander Zabat Aleem from the village of Shewaki. Another famous figure from the Bagrami district was former business tycoon brothers Haji Abdul Rahman Rasul and Haji Abdul Azim Rasul which were from the village of Shewaki, who had exclusive and sole distribution of Bridgestone tires and Mazda automobiles in Afghanistan.
