= Dehnawe Farza =

- Location in Afghanistan
- Coordinates: 34°47′23″N 69°07′25″E
- Country: Afghanistan
- Province: Kabul Province
- District: Farza District
- Time zone: UTC+4:30

The village of Dehnawe Farza (Deh Now-ye Farzah) is the center of the Farza District, Kabul Province, Afghanistan. It is located on 34.7897°N 69.0372°E at 2,111 m altitude.

== See also ==
- Kabul Province
