= Char Asiab District =

Char Asiab District چهار آسیاب
- District
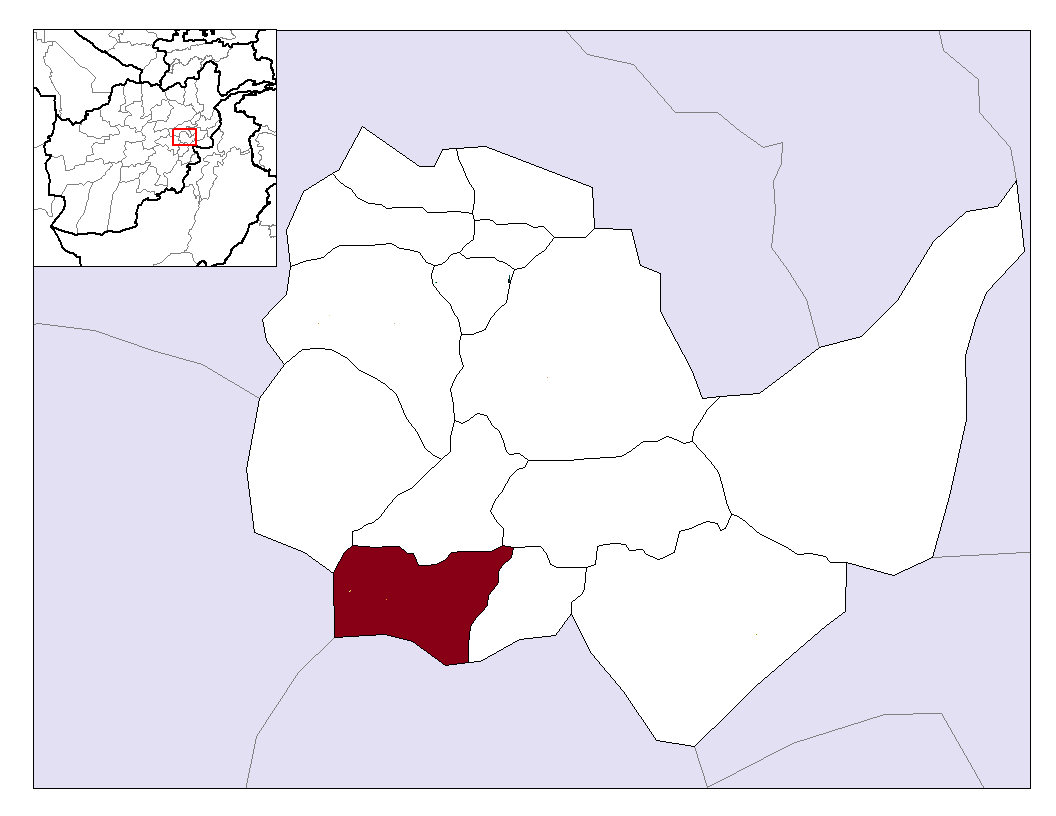
- Location in Kabul Province
- Country: Afghanistan
- Province: Kabul Province
- Capital: Qalai Naeem

Population (2020)
  - Total: 41,452
- Time zone: UTC+04:30 (AST)

Char Asiab District (Note: Pashto: چهار آسیاب Dari: چهار آسیاب) (or Charasia) is a district, approximately 11 km (7 miles) south of the city of Kabul, and is situated in the southern part of Kabul province, Afghanistan. It has a population of 41,452 people (2020 estimate). The majority are Pashtuns, followed by Tajiks as well as a few Hazaras.

Char Asiab district borders Logar province to the south, Wardak province to the west, Paghman District to the north-west, Kabul to the north, and Bagrami and Mussahi districts to the west. The headquarters of Char Asiab district is Qala-e Malik, which is located in the western end of the district.

The Kabul River flows through Char Asiab district. Agriculture is the main source of income for the people. Even with a low water table in the summer, the land can be irrigated and cultivated.

Around 1992 Char Asiab went through a period of destruction in the Second Afghan Civil War. At the time of the Mujahideen regime it was used as the main military base of Hezb-e-Islami Gulbudin, until they were pushed out by the Taliban in early 1995. The Taliban were in turn pushed out of the district by government forces in March 1995, after which a mass grave of Hazara men was found, with unknown perpetrators. In October 1995, the Taliban captured the district again, using it as an operational headquarters for their push on Kabul. After this point, it stayed under Taliban control until 2001.
