= Qalai Naeem =

- Location in Afghanistan
- Coordinates: 34°23′55″N 69°10′3″E
- Country: Afghanistan
- Province: Kabul Province
- District: Char Asiab District
- Elevation: 6,047 ft (1,843 m)
- Time zone: UTC+4:30

Qalai Naeem is a village in eastern Afghanistan. It is the district center of Char Asiab District, Kabul Province. It is located at 34.3986°N 69.1675°E at 1,843 m altitude.

== See also ==
- Kabul Province
