= Khaki Jabbar District =

- District
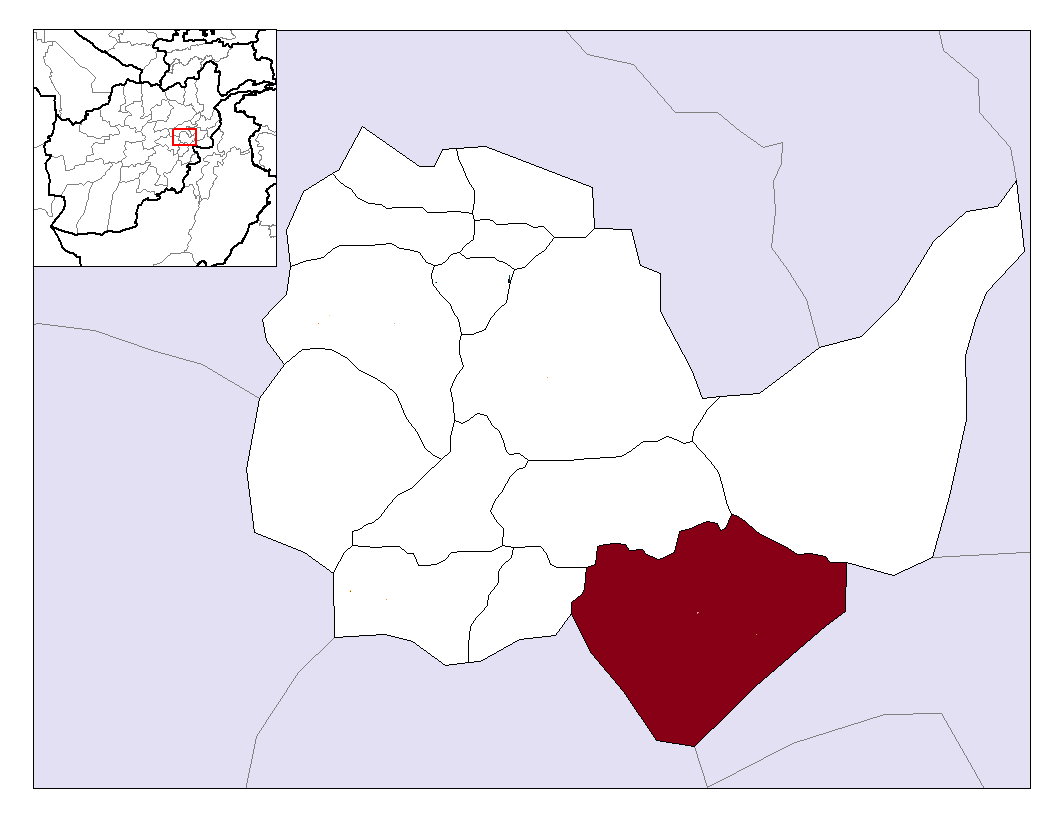
- Location in Kabul Province
- Country: Afghanistan
- Province: Kabul Province
- Capital: Khak-i Jabbar

Population (2015)
  - Total: 14,604
- Time zone: UTC+04:30 (AST)

Khaki Jabbar District (Pashto: خاکجبار ولسوالي) is a mountainous district situated in the southeastern part of Kabul Province, Afghanistan. The district headquarters is Khak-i Jabbar village, which is located in the central part of the district.

== Demographics ==
Like in the rest of Afghanistan, no exact population numbers are available. The Afghan Ministry of Rural Rehabilitation & Development (MRRD) along with UNHCR estimates the population of the district to be around 7,461. According to AIMS and UNHCR estimates in July 2002, the overwhelmingly majority of the population are Pashtuns (at 95%), while the remaining 5% are ethnic Tajiks.

== Geography ==
Khaki Jabbar district borders Logar Province and Mussahi District to the west, Bagrami and Surobi districts to the north, and Nangarhar Province to the east.

Among the major villages in the district are Chakari, Malang, Khurd Kabul, Karo Khail and Kharotti village.
