= Mussahi =

- Location in Afghanistan
- Coordinates: 34°22′N 69°13′E
- Country: Afghanistan
- Province: Kabul Province
- District: Mussahi District
- Elevation: 6,050 ft (1,844 m)
- Time zone: UTC+4:30

Mussahi (Masa'i) is a village and the headquarter of Mussahi District, Kabul Province, Afghanistan. It is located at 34.3667°N 69.2167°E at 1844 m altitude in a river valley 25 km south of Kabul. The village was seriously damaged during the two decades of wars that were fought in the country, and is now undergoing a rehabilitation process.

== See also ==
- Kabul Province
