= Mussahi District =

- District
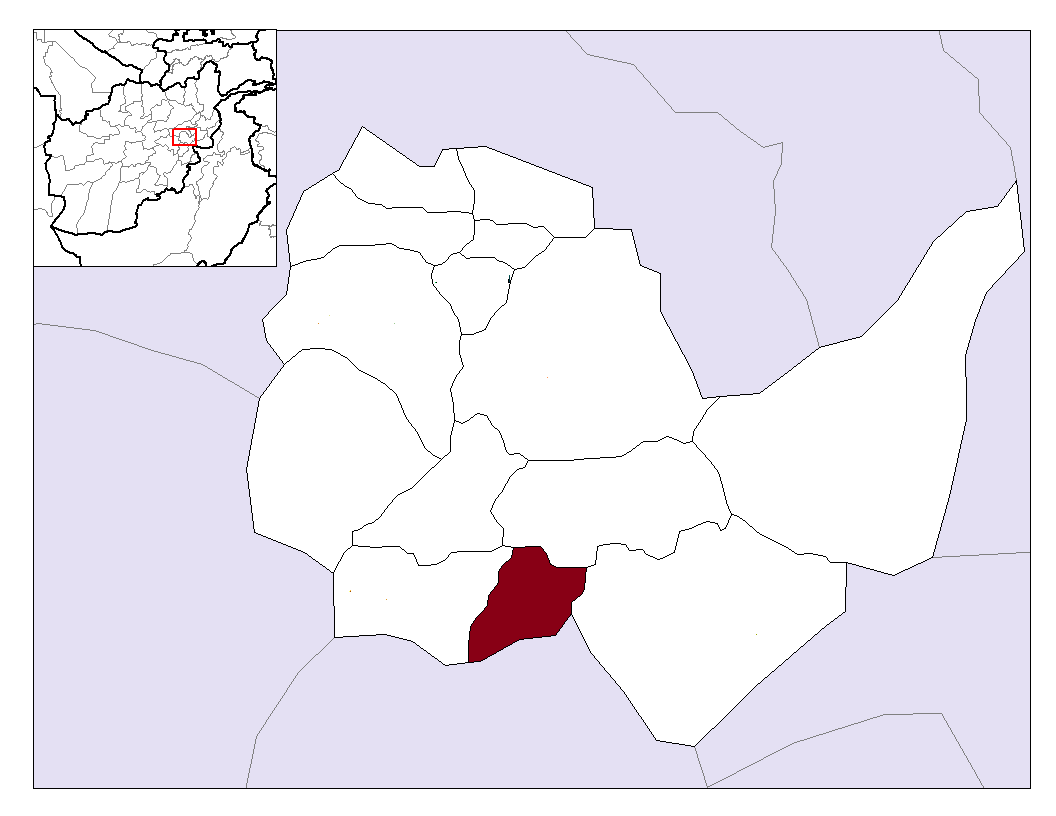
- Location in Kabul Province
- Country: Afghanistan
- Province: Kabul Province
- Capital: Mussahi

Population (2015)
  - Total: 23,882
- Time zone: UTC+04:30 (AST)

Mussahi District (Pashto: د موسهي ولسوالی) is a southern district of Kabul Province, Afghanistan. Mussai district borders Char Asiab District to the west, Bagrami District to the north, Khaki Jabbar District to the east and Logar Province to the south. Its headquarter, Mussahi village, is in the central part of the district.

== Demography ==
It had a population of 60000 people by the 2018 UNHCR official estimation. The Pashtuns form the majority of the population and there is distinctive Tajik population.

Mussahi district is located at the south of Kabul (25 km away from Kabul City) with fair road access, Formerly part of Char Asiab district, it was made an independent district in 2001. The district is categorized as an agricultural area. The main agricultural production are wheat, onion, potatoes, tomatoes and fresh vegetable. Generally, farmers are also engaged in small-scale animal husbandry, keeping cows, sheep and chickens for self-consumption. This district consists of 67 villages. The main villages of this district are Qishlaq Bala, Said Khail, Shahid Khanh, Mayan Khail, Di Kalan, Qultaghan, Qali AbdulRaouf, Alo Khail, Payanda Khail, Qishlaq Paeem, Charso village, Haji Malang Baba, Chino Ghundi, Rahmatabad, Chaman Qala and others . The Mussahi district has been almost fully destroyed during the wars, and like all districts of the country, is now going through a reconstruction. The Logar River passes through this district and divides this district in two part (Bara Mussahi and Kuza Mussahi). Guldara stupa is located in Guldara valley (Flowers Valley) this stupa made in 2nd century by Kushan empire. Chino Ghundi is one of the best national park even in 1965 Mohammad Zahir Shah king of Afghanistan tourism place.

== Security and Politics ==
It was reported Afghan and NATO forces arrested 12 militants accused of anti-government activities on 17 November 2009 in the district.
