= Maryam University =

University in Kabul, Afghanistan

- دانشگاه مریم
- Type: Private
- Established: 2007
- Chancellor: Dr. Shahla Rasheed
- Location: Kabul, Kabul Province, Afghanistan
- Website: www.maryam.edu.af

Maryam University (Dari: دانشگاه مریم) is a private university established in 2007, located in the Kabul city of the Kabul Province, Afghanistan.

== Programs and Courses ==
- Bachelor in Law (LLB)
- Bachelor in Political Science (BPS)
- Bachelor in Business Administration (BBA)
- Bachelor in Information Technology (BIT)
- CEL/DEL in English Language
