= Khak-i Jabbar =

- Location in Afghanistan
- Coordinates: 34°24′20″N 69°29′40″E
- Country: Afghanistan
- Province: Kabul Province
- District: Khaki Jabbar District
- Elevation: 7,503 ft (2,287 m)
- Time zone: UTC+4:30

Khak-i Jabbar is a village and the district headquarters of Khaki Jabbar District, Kabul Province, Afghanistan. It is located at 34.4056°N 69.4944°E at 2,287 m altitude.

== See also ==
- Kabul Province
