= Qara Bagh, Kabul Province =

Town in Kabul Province, Afghanistan

Qara Bagh
- Location in Afghanistan
- Coordinates: 34°50′29″N 69°8′56″E
- Country: Afghanistan
- Province: Kabul Province
- District: Qarabagh District
- Elevation: 5,135 ft (1,565 m)
- Time zone: UTC+4:30

Qara Bagh is a town and the center of Qarabagh District, Kabul Province, Afghanistan. The population is 13,000 (2007 calculation). The town's infrastructure was seriously damaged during the successive wars in Afghanistan.

== See also ==
- Qarabagh District
- Kabul Province
