= Qarabagh District, Kabul =

Qarabagh District
- District
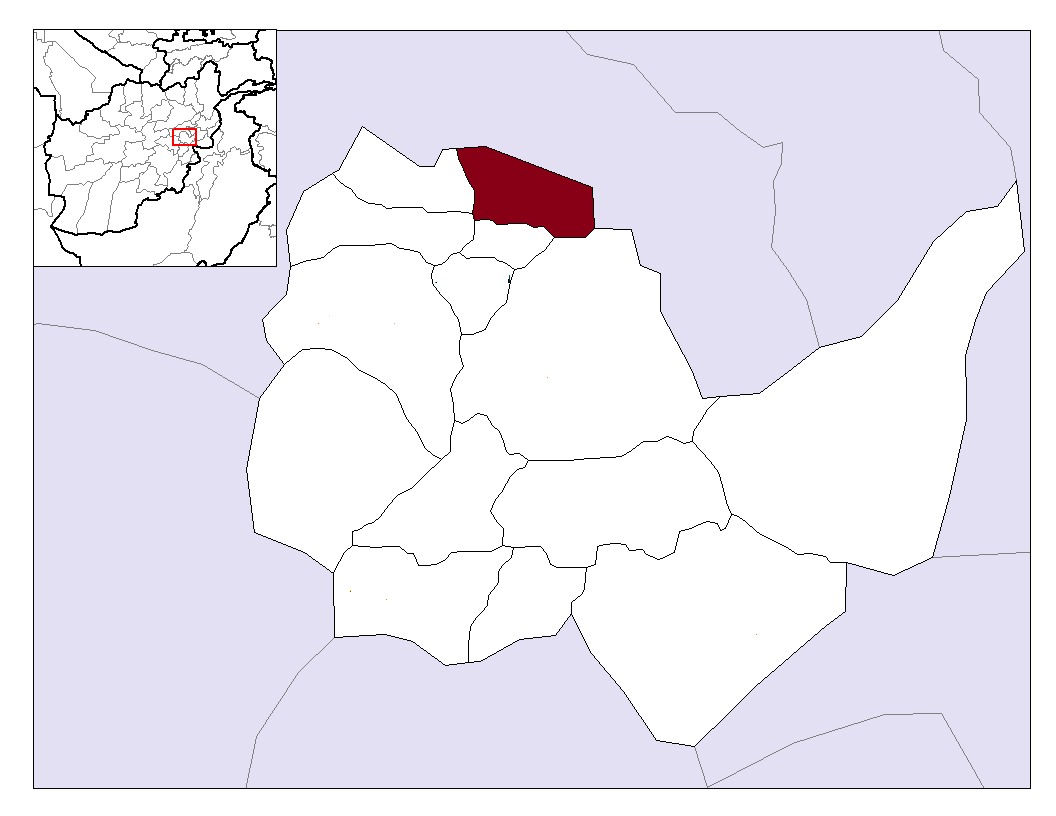
- Location in Kabul Province
- Coordinates: 34.8494°N 69.1764°E
- Country: Afghanistan
- Province: Kabul Province
- Capital: Qara Bagh

Population (2015)
  - Total: 78,004
- Time zone: UTC+04:30 (AST)

Qarabagh District is located 50 kilometers north of Kabul City in Afghanistan, and 20 kilometers southeast of Bagram Airbase. The district is part of Kabul Province and is on the route between Kabul and Parwan Province. It has a population of 15,000, with an expected 19,000 more refugees to return from Pakistan and Iran in the future (2002 official UNHCR est.). As of 2002 around 60% of the population are Tajiks and 40% Pashtuns.

Qarabagh district borders Guldara and Istalif districts to the north, Parvan Province to the south and east, and Deh Sabz and Kalakan districts to the south.

The headquarters is the town of Qara Bagh, which is located in the western part of the district. The whole district has suffered severe damage. All agricultural, health and education infrastructures were destroyed during the wars. Many people fled from the district. This district produces 9% of the raisins produced in Afghanistan, most of its residents being owners of large vineyards.

== See also ==
- Districts of Afghanistan
- Qara Bagh, Kabul Province
- Kabul Province
