= Minar-i Chakri =

Pillar of carved stones in Afghanistan

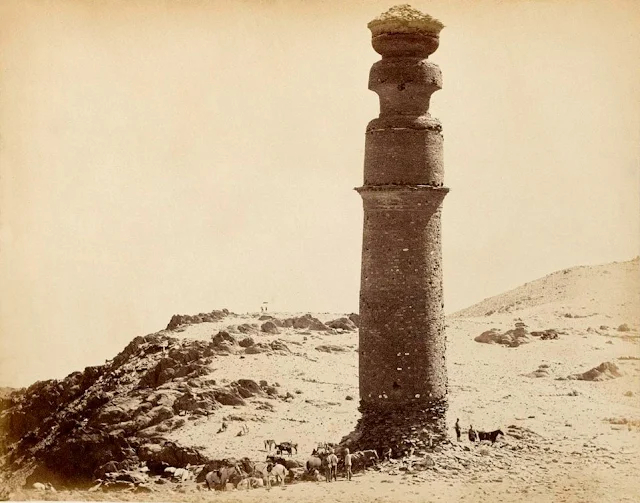
Minar-i-Chakri ("Alexander's Column"), c.1879

Minar-i Chakri was a pillar made of carved stones on an elevation of 2500m, 16 kilometers southeast of Kabul in Afghanistan. It was 28.5 meters high and was one of Buddhist buildings which at the time of the Kushan Empire was built in the area of Kabultals. Minar-i Chakri was built in the 1st century AD and was heavily damaged during the Afghan Civil war. In March 1998 it collapsed, falling to the south-west. The pedestal and brick debris remain visible in satellite imagery.

== Location ==
Minar-i Chakri was located at 34°25'10.4"N 69°17'33.7"E, at an elevation of 2500m on the northern slope of the Shakh Baranta ridge overlooking the plain of Kabul, 700m below. A track leads up to the site from the cemetery 4km to the north of the pillar. The city can be seen from above and the snow-capped mountains of the Hindu Kush in the background. To the south there is a plateau up to another mountain range with peaks of over 3000 meters. The pillar lays widely on an old trade and tour route, the closest connection to the regional capital of the Greek-Bactrian empire of Alexandria on the Caucasus. It is 65 kilometres north of Kabul, and from the southeast, it goes towards Jalalabad heading towards India. Under the rule of the Kushanas, the Greek province (satrapy) Paropanisadai was renamed Kabulistan and the provincial administration was moved to Kabul. During the reign of King Vima Kadphises, from around 100 AD, the empire began to expand into India and the economic had a magnificent growth, which was reflected in the construction of Buddhist monuments and monasteries around the capital. This also included the construction of two Buddhist pillars (Sanskrit Stambha) in the south of the city: the 19 meter high Surkh Minar ("red tower"), which collapsed in an earthquake in spring 1965, and the Minareh Syah ("black tower"), which is closer to the foot of the mountain, which was named Minar-i Chakri in the 19th century.

== Discovery and investigations ==
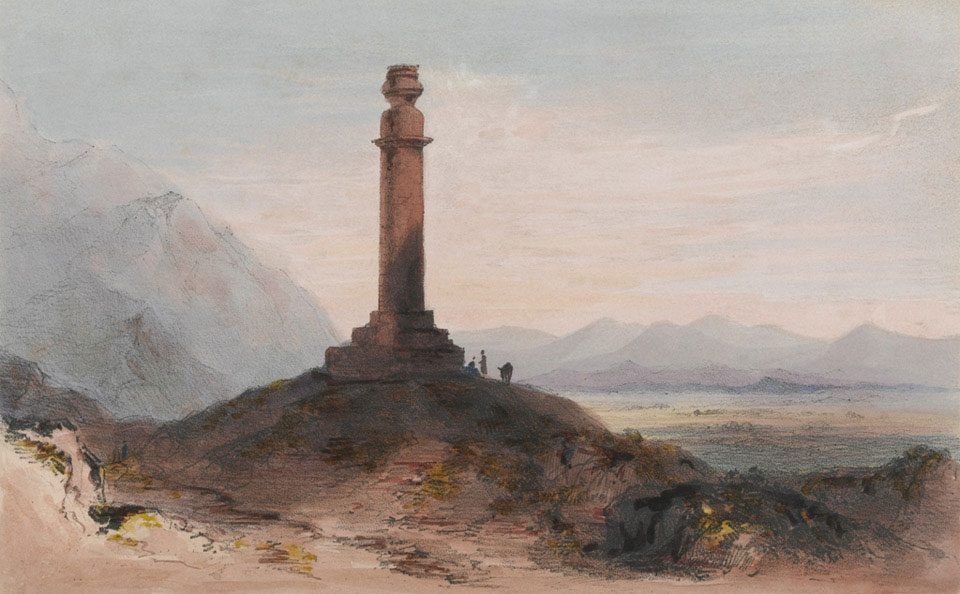
Alexander's Column near Kabul, c.1842

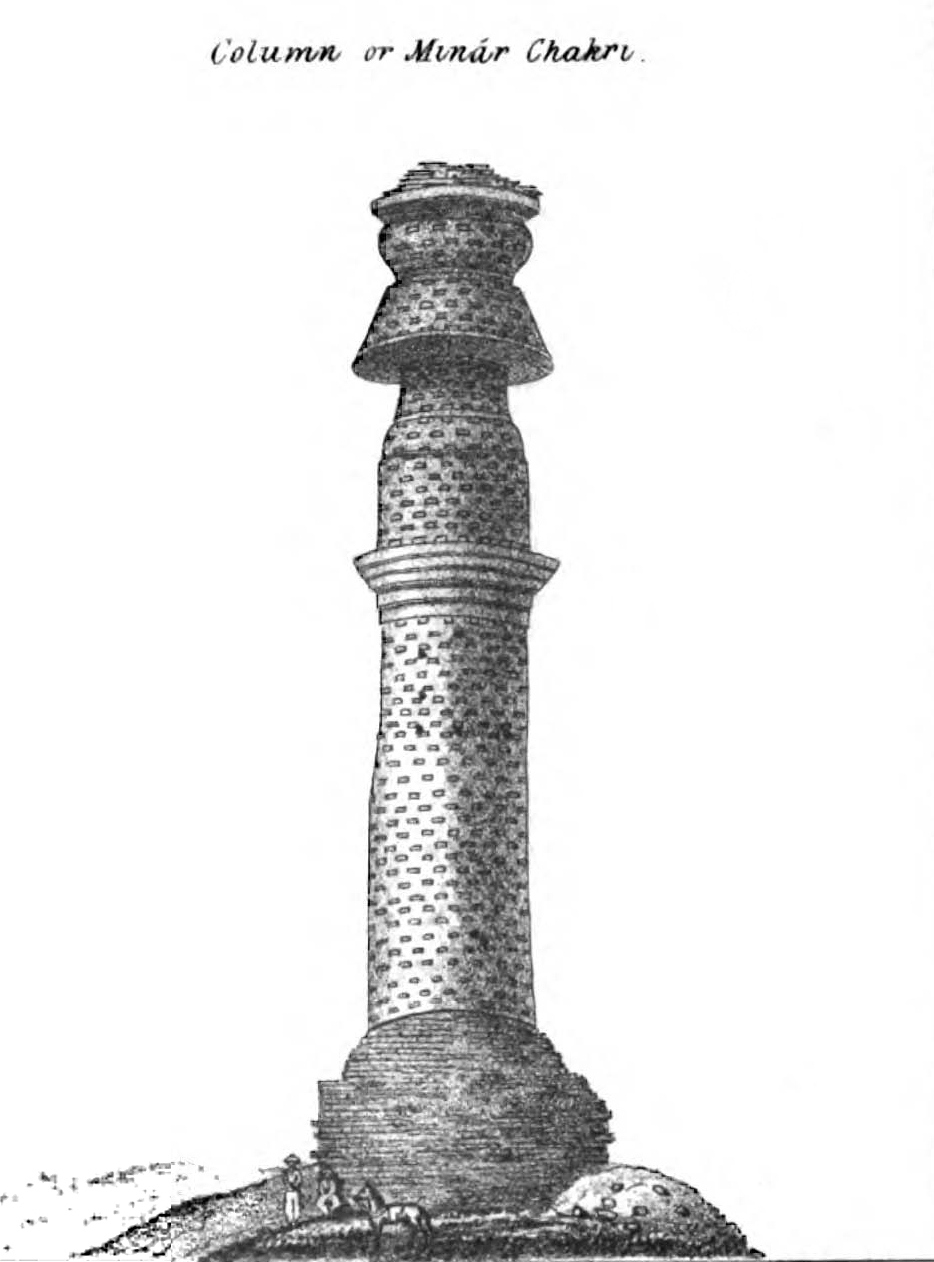
Minar-i Chakri in 1836 drawn by Charles Masson

Minar-i Chakri was first found on its way into Western antiquity through British soldiers who were exploring the country in the 19th century. In 1841, Charles Masson published a detailed report and the drawing about a "Greek monument" in London. However with the withdrawal of the British Army at the end of the First Anglo-Afghan War some of the survivors reported about a pillar they had seen.
