= Kabul Golf Club =

Golf course in Qargha, Afghanistan

Coordinates: 34.55023°N 69.03517°E

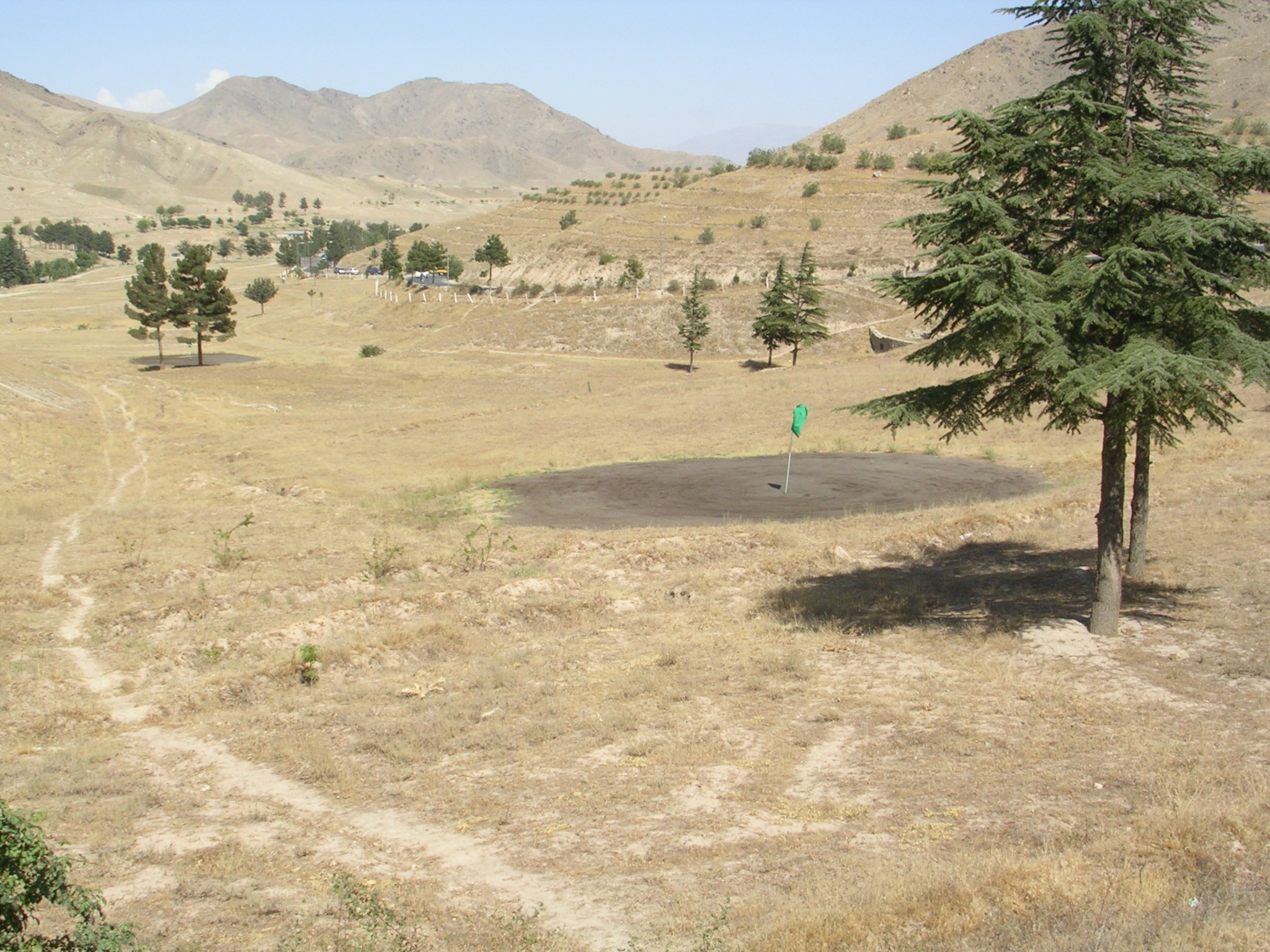
Kabul Golf Club

The Kabul Golf Club is a nine-hole golf course located near Qargha, around 11 km (7 mi) from the center of Kabul, Afghanistan.

== Overview ==
The greens at the Kabul Golf Club are actually brown to black due to their composition of a mixture of sand and oil (which keeps the sand from blowing). Plans for a modern irrigation system are moribund due to lack of funds.

Mainly affluent Afghans and foreigners frequent the course. The 2005 entrance fee for The Kabul Golf Club (http://www.kabulgolfclub.org) is 750 Afghani ($15 US Dollars) and a year membership is $300 (15,000 Afghani). The club is run by Mohammad Afzal Abdul (also called Mohammed Bashir), its director and golf pro, who worked as a caddy at the course as a young man before fleeing into exile in Pakistan. Business has dropped off since opening as international agency staffing has declined.

== History ==
Originally six holes, the course opened in 1967 during the reign of Mohammed Zahir Shah, was closed in 1978, and reopened in 2004. During these three decades it has undergone several changes. It was relocated to its present site in 1973 after the king was overthrown in a coup d'état and completely closed following a 1978 communist coup. It was reopened in 1993 but closed again in 1996 when the Taliban regime banned sports. After the 2001 invasion of Afghanistan, the course was used as an area for military training in the removal of land mines. In the process of restoration to its present state, three Soviet tanks and a multiple rocket launcher were removed by a nonprofit agency.

In 2004 the Kabul Golf Club was reopened again. During the intervening seven years little has changed. Play on the golf course has been sporadic, and at the mercy of the local security situation. Beginning in 2011, a fund-raising effort has been underway with the goal of restoring the golf course and related facilities.
