= Deh Sabz District =

Coordinates: 34°32′36″N 69°17′16″E

Deh Sabz District ولسوالی ده‌سبز
- District
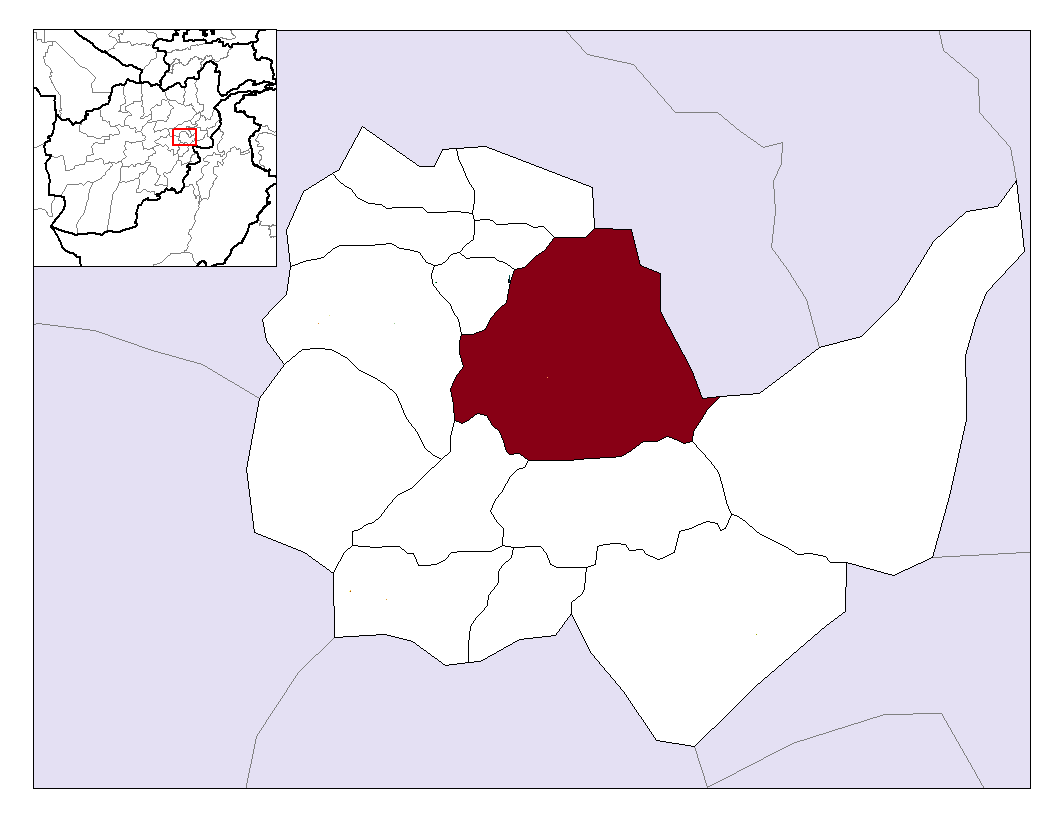
- Location in Kabul Province
- Country: Afghanistan
- Province: Kabul Province
- Capital: Tarakhel

Population (2015)
  - Total: 55,202
- Time zone: UTC+04:30 (AST)

Deh Sabz District, also romanized Dih Sabz District, (the name translating to 'Green Village') is situated northeast of Kabul city in Afghanistan. It has a population of 100,136 people (2002 UNHCR estimate), about 70% of it Pashtun and 30% Tajiks.

Deh Sabz borders Shakardara and Mir Bacha Kot districts to the west, Kalakan and Qarabagh districts to the north-west, Parvan Province to the north and east, Surobi to the southeast and Bagrami and Kabul districts to the south. The headquarters of Deh Sabz is the village of Tarakhel, situated in the south-western part of the district.

The Kabul River flows through the district in its southern end and the main highway (Kabul-Jalalabad) passes along it. Most of its people live in villages. Many houses were destroyed during the Soviet war in Afghanistan, and many people were displaced. Agriculture is the most important source of income, though droughts are a serious problem. Education is relatively good, there are some schools for boys and girls. The district's health care was expected to improve by 2011.

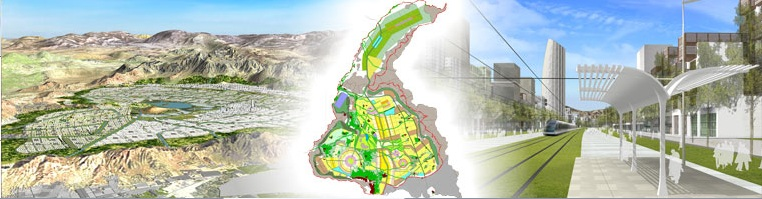
A computer-generated visual of the Kabul New City project as of 2009, showing buildings, the city map, and light rail track

In early 2007, the Afghan Ministry for Rural Rehabilitation and Development (MRRD) laid the foundation of a modern residential scheme in Deh Sabz district for 20,000 houses. It is part of an extension of Kabul City with Deh Sabz district.
