= Mir Bacha Kot District =

Mir Bacha Kot District Saraai Khwaja
- District
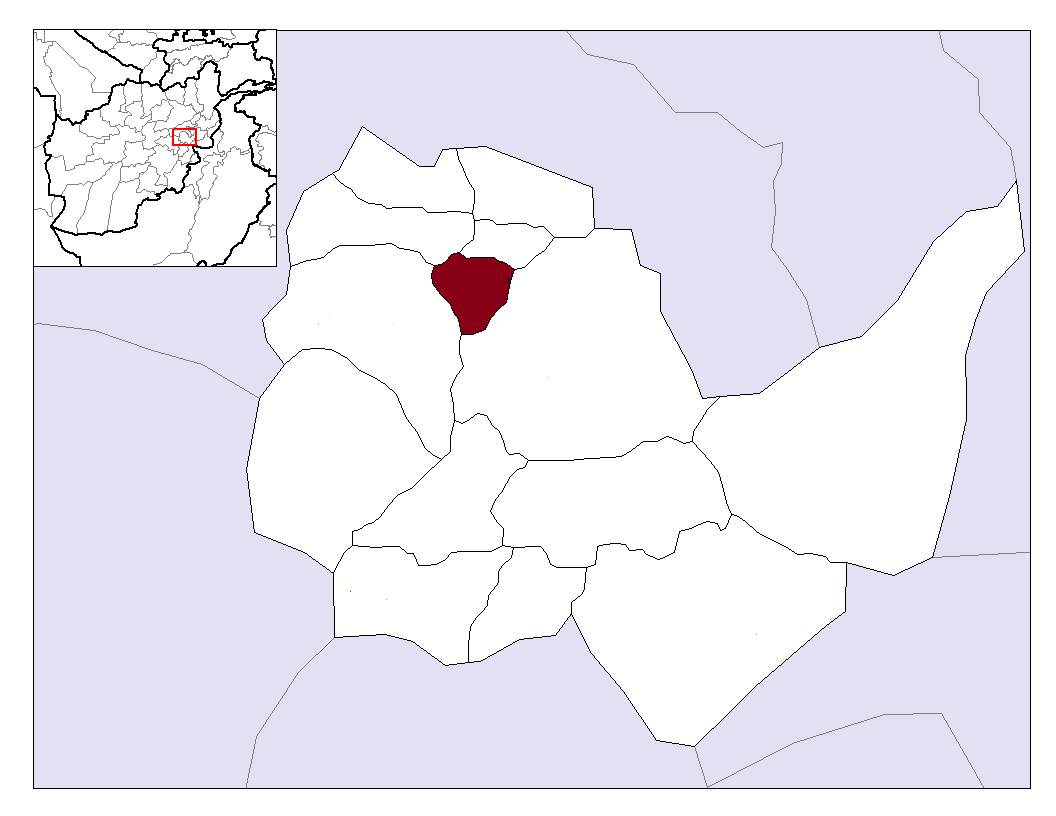
- Location in Kabul Province

- Location within Afghanistan
- Country: Afghanistan
- Province: Kabul
- Capital: Mir Bacha Kot

Population (2025)
  - Total: 64,434
- Time zone: UTC+04:30 (Afghanistan Time)

Mir Bacha Kot District is one of the districts of Kabul Province in Afghanistan. Its administrative center is the town of Mir Bacha Kot. The district is located in the central part of the province and has an estimated population of 64,434 people as of September 2025. Majority are ethnic Tajiks followed by Pashtuns.

Mir Bacha Kot District is about 37 km (23 mi) to the north of Kabul. It borders Guldara and Kalakan districts to the north, Deh Sabz District to the east, and Shakardara District to the west. Its administrative center is Mir Bacha Kot village, which is located in the central part of the district, 25 km (16 mi) north of Kabul. The district was almost fully destroyed during the war and now is undergoing a rebuilding process. The main source of income is agriculture.
