= Bagrami =

- Location in Afghanistan
- Coordinates: 34°29′28″N 69°16′32″E
- Country: Afghanistan
- Elevation: 5,896 ft (1,797 m)

Population (2007)
  - Total: 31,680
- Time zone: + 4.30

Bagrami is a village on the eastern fringes of Kabul at 34.4911°N 69.2756°E and 1797 m altitude, part of municipal District 12 and partly in District 22. The population is 31,680 (2007 calculation). Downtown Kabul can be reached in 30 minutes. The Bagrami Industrial Park is one of the major projects for the economy of the region. In 2010, the town also harboured a shanty town of mud-built huts for refugees escaping the violence of the Taliban insurgency in the southern provinces of Afghanistan.

== Climate ==
Bagrami has a hot-summer humid continental climate (Köppen climate classification: Dsa). July is the warmest month of the year. The temperature in July averages 25.0 °C (77.0 °F). At −3.4 °C (25.9 °F) on average, January is the coldest month of the year.

About 415 millimetres (16.3 in) of precipitation falls annually. The driest month is August with 4 millimetres (0.2 in). In April, the precipitation reaches its peak, with an average of 82 millimetres (3.2 in).

Climate data for Bagrami, Kabul Province
Month	Jan	Feb	Mar	Apr	May	Jun	Jul	Aug	Sep	Oct	Nov	Dec	Year
Mean daily maximum °C (°F)	2.8 (37.0)	3.4 (38.1)	11.1 (52.0)	18.4 (65.1)	24.3 (75.7)	29.1 (84.4)	31.5 (88.7)	30.3 (86.5)	26.3 (79.3)	20.1 (68.2)	12.5 (54.5)	7.0 (44.6)	18.1 (64.5)
Daily mean °C (°F)	−3.4 (25.9)	−2.4 (27.7)	4.8 (40.6)	11.8 (53.2)	17.6 (63.7)	22.3 (72.1)	25.0 (77.0)	23.9 (75.0)	19.9 (67.8)	13.8 (56.8)	6.7 (44.1)	0.8 (33.4)	11.7 (53.1)
Mean daily minimum °C (°F)	−9.6 (14.7)	−8.2 (17.2)	−1.6 (29.1)	5.2 (41.4)	10.8 (51.4)	15.4 (59.7)	18.4 (65.1)	17.5 (63.5)	13.4 (56.1)	7.5 (45.5)	0.8 (33.4)	−5.5 (22.1)	5.3 (41.6)
Average precipitation mm (inches)	44 (1.7)	63 (2.5)	69 (2.7)	82 (3.2)	54 (2.1)	14 (0.6)	9 (0.4)	4 (0.2)	8 (0.3)	16 (0.6)	25 (1.0)	27 (1.1)	415 (16.4)
Source: Climate-Data.org

== See also ==
- Kabul Province
