= Kabul Province =

Province of Afghanistan

Kabul کابل
- Province
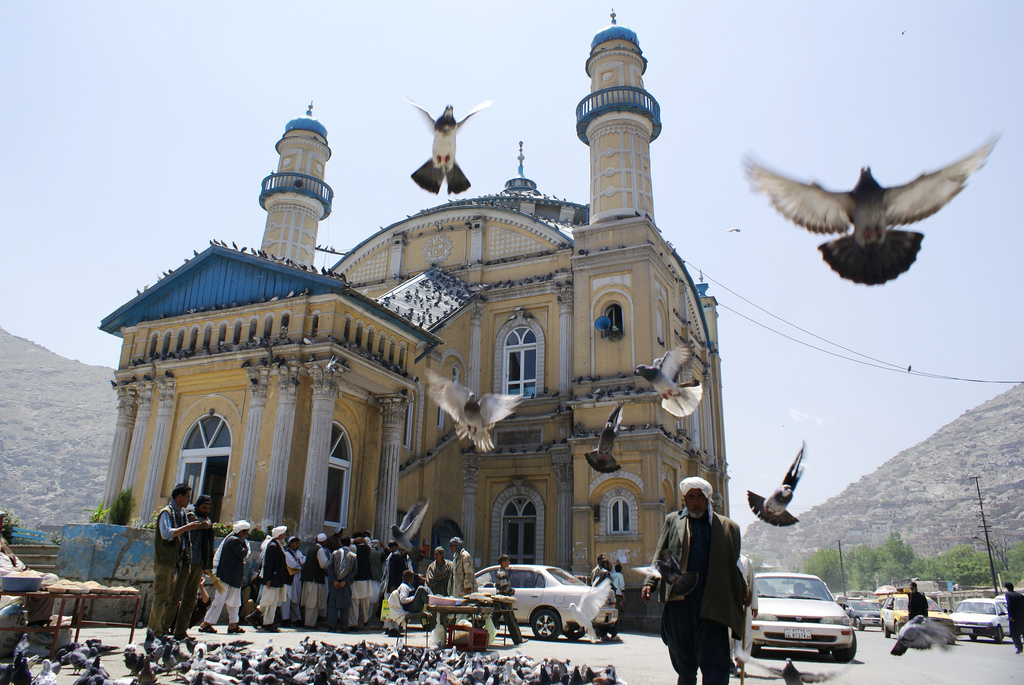
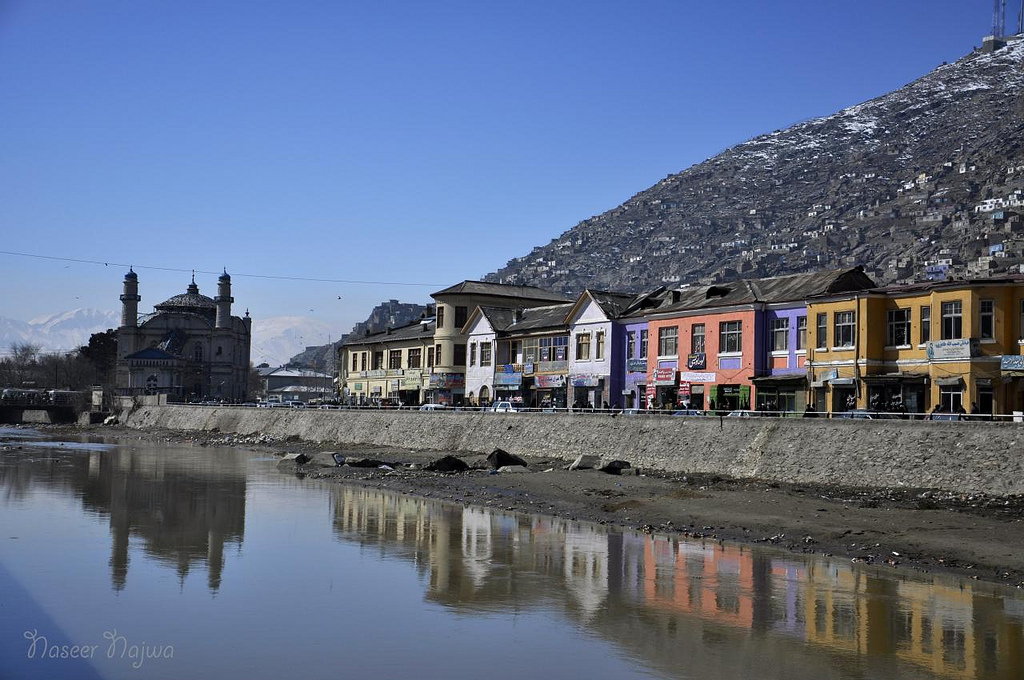
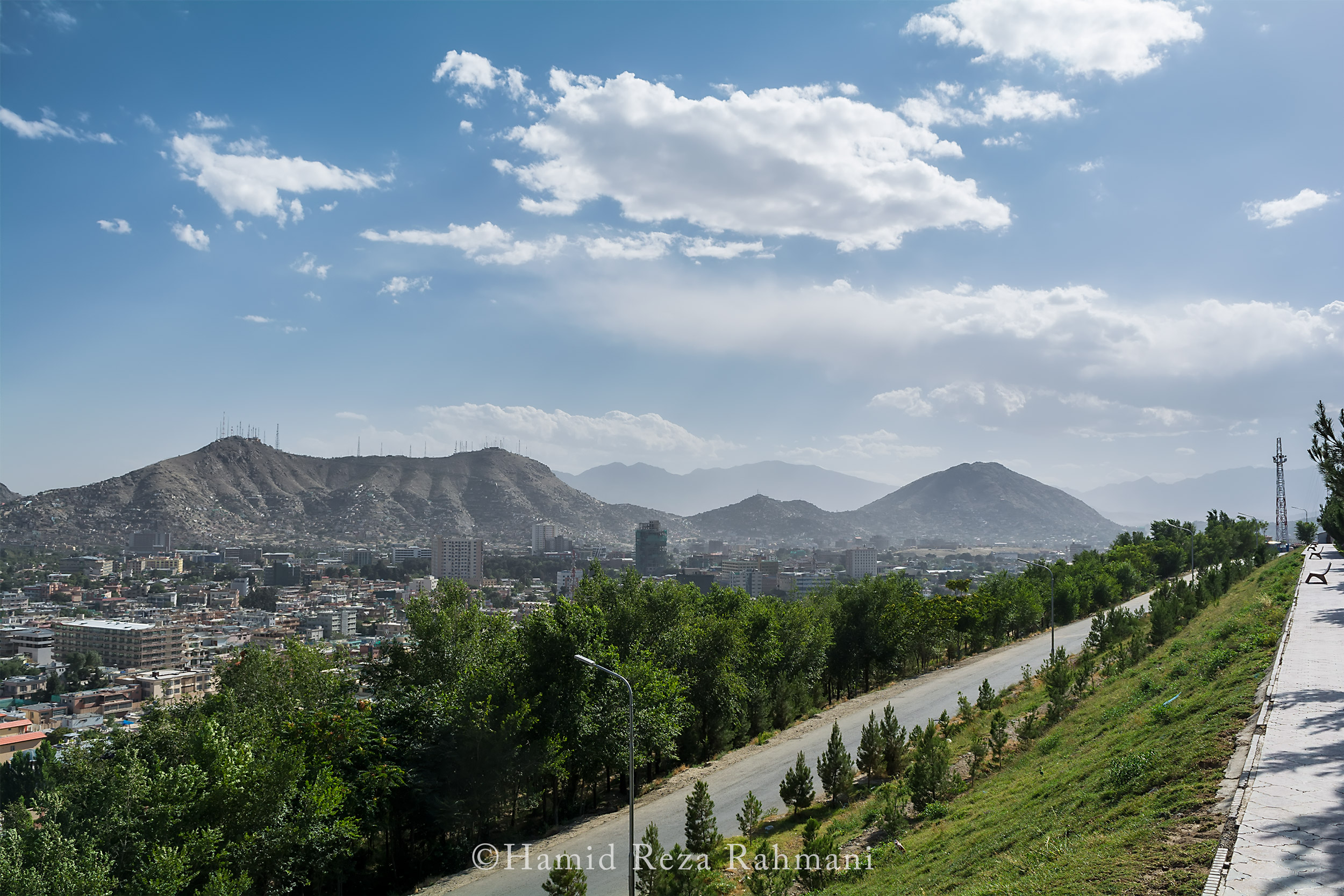
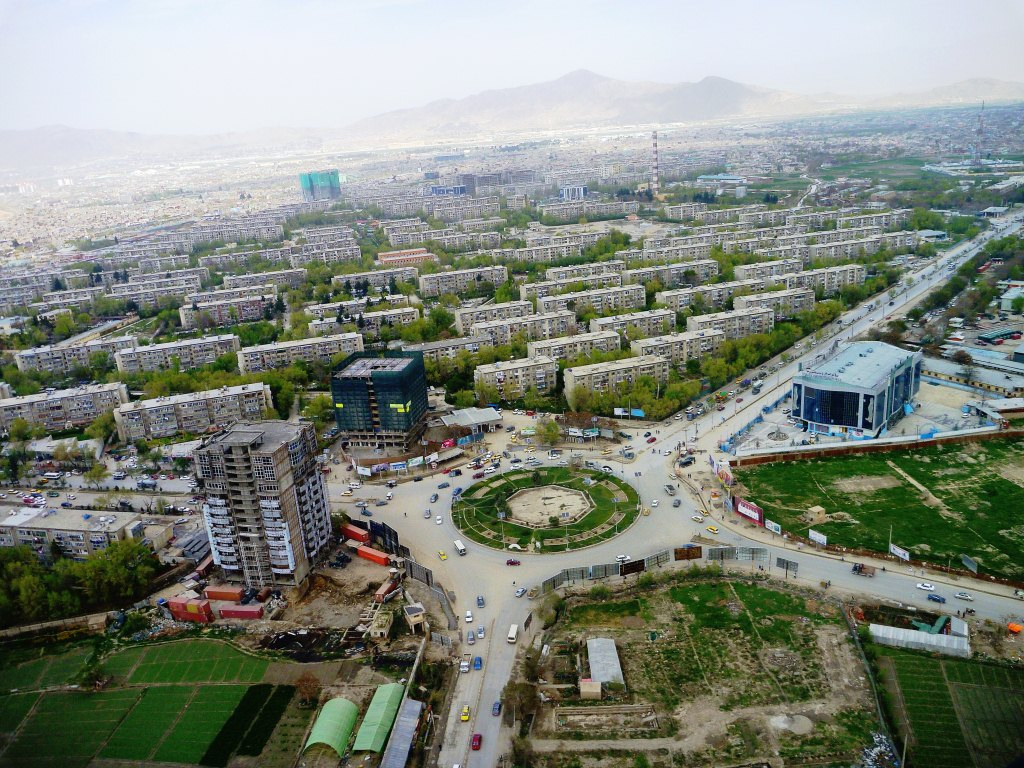
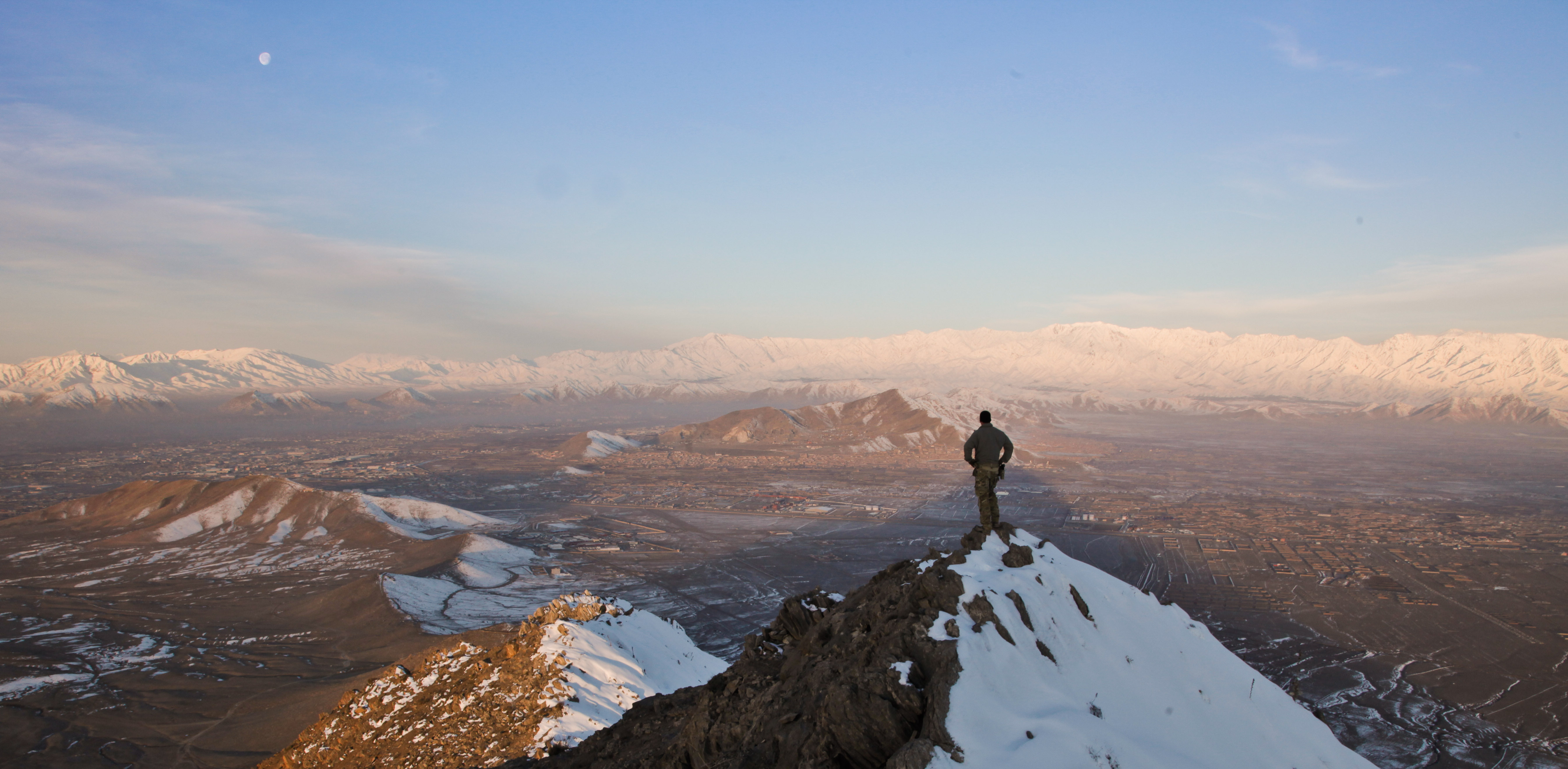
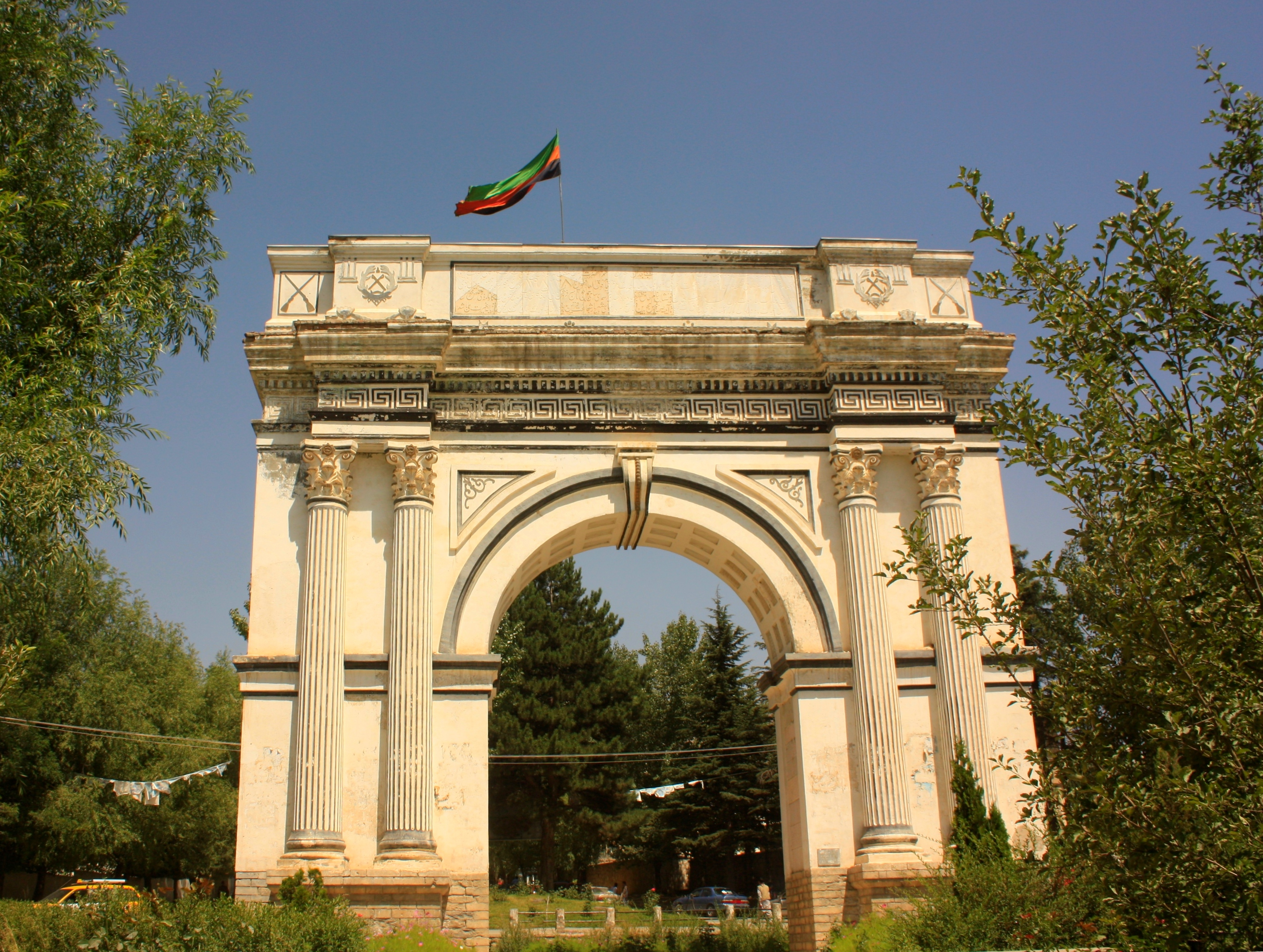

- Map of Afghanistan with Kabul highlighted
- Coordinates (Capital): 34.00°N 69.00°E
- Country: Afghanistan
- Capital: Kabul

Government
  - Governor: Mohammad Aman Obaid
  - Deputy Governor: Mufti Mohammad Idris
  - Police Chief: Wali Jan Hamza

Area
  - Total: 4,523 km^{2} (1,746 sq mi)
  - Water: 0 km^{2} (0 sq mi)

Population (2022)
  - Total: 5,572,630
  - Density: 1,232/km^{2} (3,191/sq mi)
- Time zone: UTC+4:30 (Afghanistan Time)
- Postal codes: 10xx
- ISO 3166 code: AF-KAB
- Main languages: Dari; Pashto

Kabul (Note: /ˈkɑːbuːl/ /ˈkɑːbəl/, /ˈkɑːbʊl, kəˈbuːl/, /kəˈbʊl/) (Note: Pashto: کابل, romanized: Kābəl, pronounced [kɑˈbəl]; Dari: کابل, romanized: Kābul, cyrillized: Кобул, pronounced [kʰɑːˈbʊl]) is one of the thirty-four provinces of Afghanistan, situated in the east of the country. The capital of the province is Kabul city, which is Afghanistan's capital and largest city. The population of Kabul Province is over 5.5 million people as of 2022, of which over 85 percent live in urban areas. The current governor of the province is Mohammad Aman Obaid.

It borders the provinces of Parwan to the north, Kapisa to the north-east, Laghman to the east, Nangarhar to the south-east, Logar to the south, and Wardak to the west.

== History ==
Kabul's history dates back more than 3,500 years. It was once the center of Zoroastrianism and subsequently also a home for Buddhists and Hindus.

The native citizens of Kabul as per the records of the British Museum are Tajiks and Pashtuns.

The city was invaded by Arab Muslims in the 7th century by introducing Islam but was slowly taken back by the Hindu Shahis of Kabul. It was re-invaded by the Saffarids and Samanids in the 9th century followed by Mahmud of Ghaznavi in the 11th century, when the Hindu Shahi King Jay Pala committed suicide. It became part of the Ghurids after defeating the Ghaznavids, and later it was invaded by the Mongols under Genghis Khan.

Timur, founder of the Timurid dynasty, invaded the region in 14th century and developed it into a major trading center. In 1504, the city fell to Babur from the north of the country and was made into his capital, which became one of the principal cities of his later Mughal Empire. In 1525, Babur described Kabulistan in his memoirs by writing that:

In the country of Kābul there are many and various tribes. Its valleys and plains are inhabited by Tūrks, Aimāks, and Arabs. In the city and the greater part of the villages, the population consists of Tājiks (called "Sarts" by Babur). Many other of the villages and districts are occupied by Pashāis, Parāchis, Tājiks, Berekis, and Afghans. In the hill-country to the west, reside the Hazāras and Nukderis. Among the Nukderi tribes, there are some who speak the Moghul (Mongol) language. In the hill-country to the north-east lies Kaferistān, such as Kattor and Gebrek. There are eleven or twelve different languages spoken in Kābul: Arabic, Persian, Tūrki, Moghuli, Hindi, Afghani, Pashāi, Parāchi, Geberi, Bereki, and Lamghāni...

— Baburnama, 1525 AD

For much of its time Kabul was independent until it became part of the Durrani Empire in 1747. During the First Anglo-Afghan War in 1839, the British army invaded the area but withdrew in 1842, although thousands of them were killed during a surprise ambush on their way to Jalalabad. In retaliation another British force partly burned Kabul before retreating back to British India. The British again occupied the city during the Second Anglo-Afghan War in 1879, after their resident staff were massacred there, but withdrew about a year later when they installed Emir.

In 1919, King Amanullah Khan rose to power during the Third Anglo-Afghan War when Afghanistan's capital and its eastern city of Jalalabad were air raided by the No. 31 and 114 squadrons of the British Royal Air Force in May 1919. Amanullah Khan defeated the British and began modernization of the country after the signing of the Treaty of Rawalpindi. In the late 1920s, switching of power took place until Zahir Shah became the youngest new King.

In the 1960s and 1970s, Kabul was known as the Paris of central Asia as it was transforming into a European style city. Once the jewel of Asia, a very progressive and moderately modern capital. Kabul in those days had, modern cinemas, cafes, formal French gardens, schools, libraries, universities, fine boutiques. The inhabitants of Kabul known as "Kabulis" were highly educated, modern, progressive and cosmopolitan people. Where women and men attended primary school, high school and university. Mini-jupes (mini skirts) were a common sight in the 1970s. Highly educated, culturally aware and yet religious at the same time, there was never an issue with not having your hair covered or the clothes you wore in the Kabul of the 1960s and 1970s. This progressive peaceful society lasted until foreign interference occurred in the late 1970s plummeting the country to what Afghanistan has become today. In December 1979, Soviet armed forces landed at Kabul International Airport to help bolster the PDPA-led government of Afghanistan.

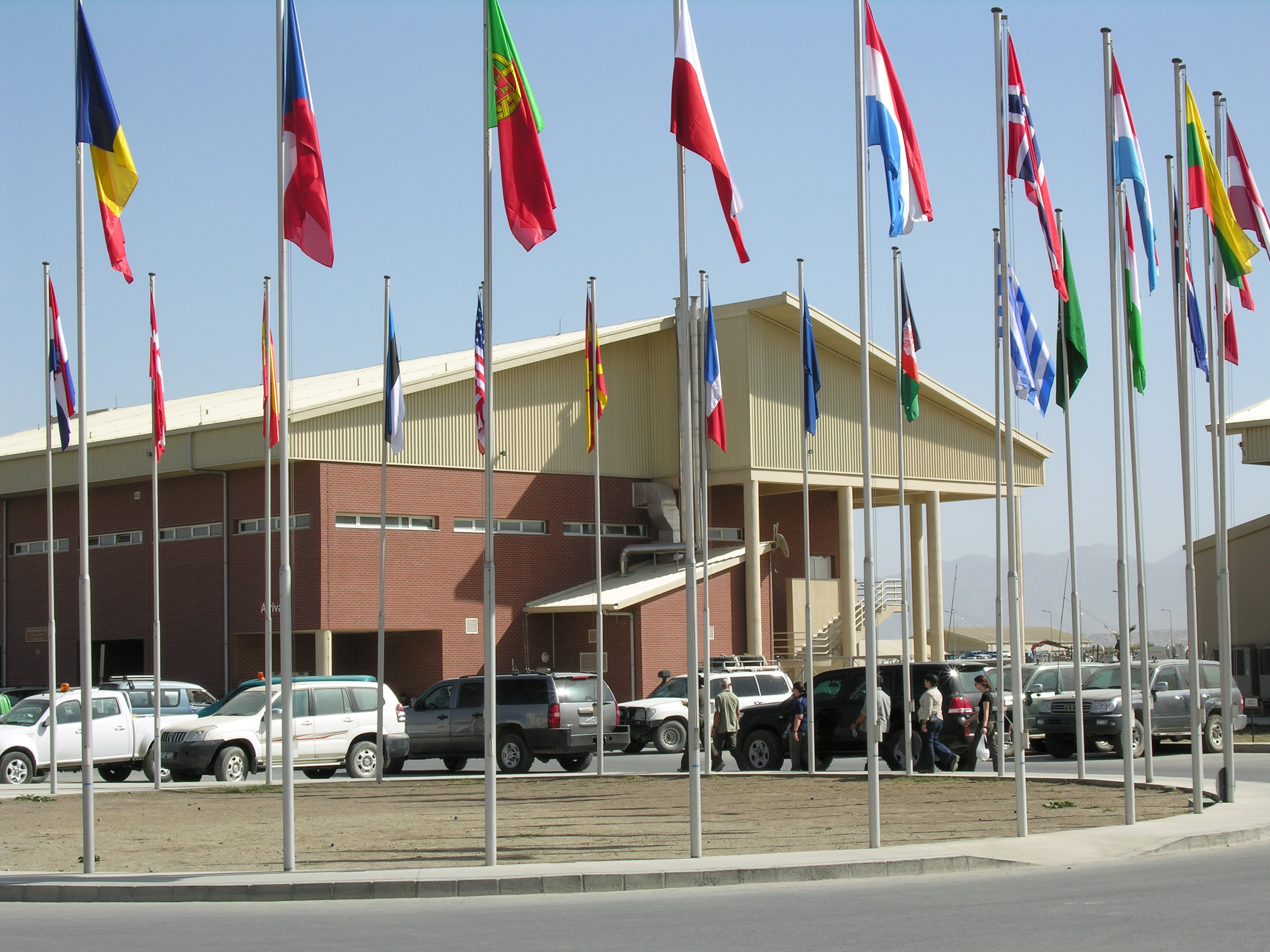
NATO's military terminal at Kabul International Airport

Kabul became the Soviet command center for approximately 10 years during their stay in Afghanistan. In February 1989, Soviet forces withdrew from Afghanistan after they were defeated by the Mujahideens. In spring of 1992 the government of Mohammad Najibullah collapsed, Kabul fell into the hands of Mujahideen forces. Destruction increased as the coalition of the parties broke into rival warring factions, and much of Kabul was damaged. In 1996 the Taliban took over the region and started a new strict Islamic Sharia rule which restricted most forms of education, entertainment, women from working, men from shaving beards, and many normal human activities or hobbies.

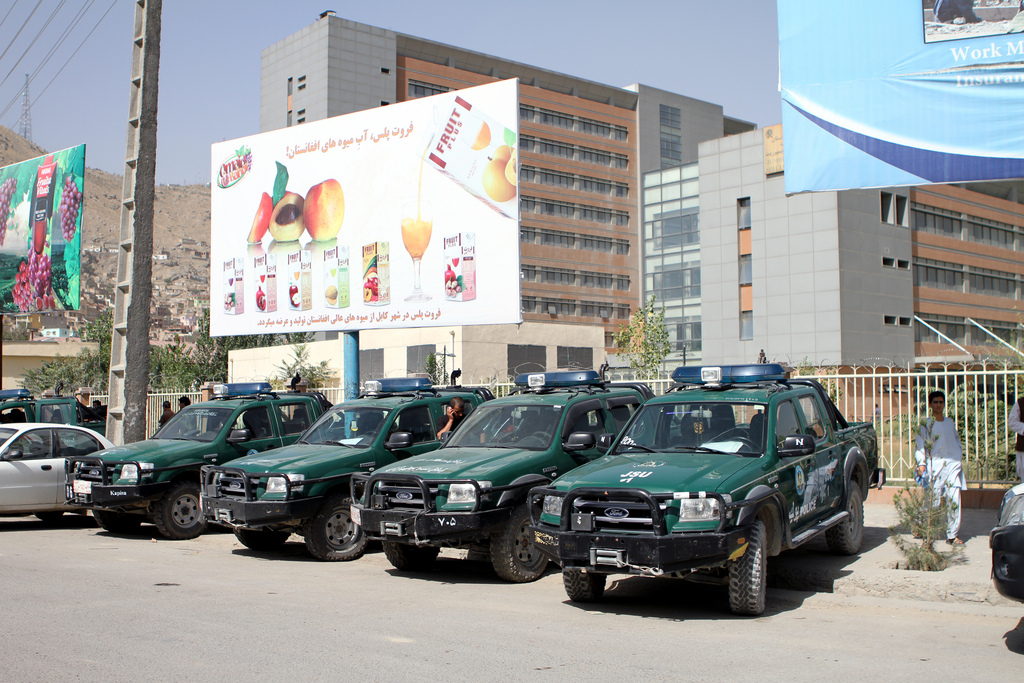
Common vehicles of the Afghan National Police

Less than a month after the September 11 attacks in the United States, in October 2001, the United States Armed Forces assisted by British Armed Forces provided massive air support to United Front (Northern Alliance) ground forces during Operation Enduring Freedom. The Taliban abandoned Kabul and the United Front came to take control of the city. In December 2001 Kabul became the capital of the Afghan Transitional Administration, which transformed to the present Government of Afghanistan that is led by President Hamid Karzai.

In early 2002 a NATO-led International Security Assistance Force (ISAF) was deployed in Kabul and from there they began taking over other parts of the country. The war-torn city began to see some positive development as millions of expats returned to the country. Its population has grown from about 500,000 in 2001 to over 3 million by 2007. Many foreign embassies re-opened, especially the biggest U.S. Embassy. Afghan government institutions were also re-developed and modernized. Since 2008 the newly trained Afghan National Police (ANP) and the Afghan National Army (ANA) have been in charge of security in the area, while NATO also has a heavy presence but is not patrolling the streets anymore.

While the city is being developed, it is also the scene of occasional deadly suicide bombings and explosions carried out by the Haqqani network, Taliban's Quetta Shura, Hezb-i Islami, Al Qaeda, and other anti-government elements who are allegedly supported and guided by Pakistan's Inter-Services Intelligence (ISI) spy network.

== Geography ==
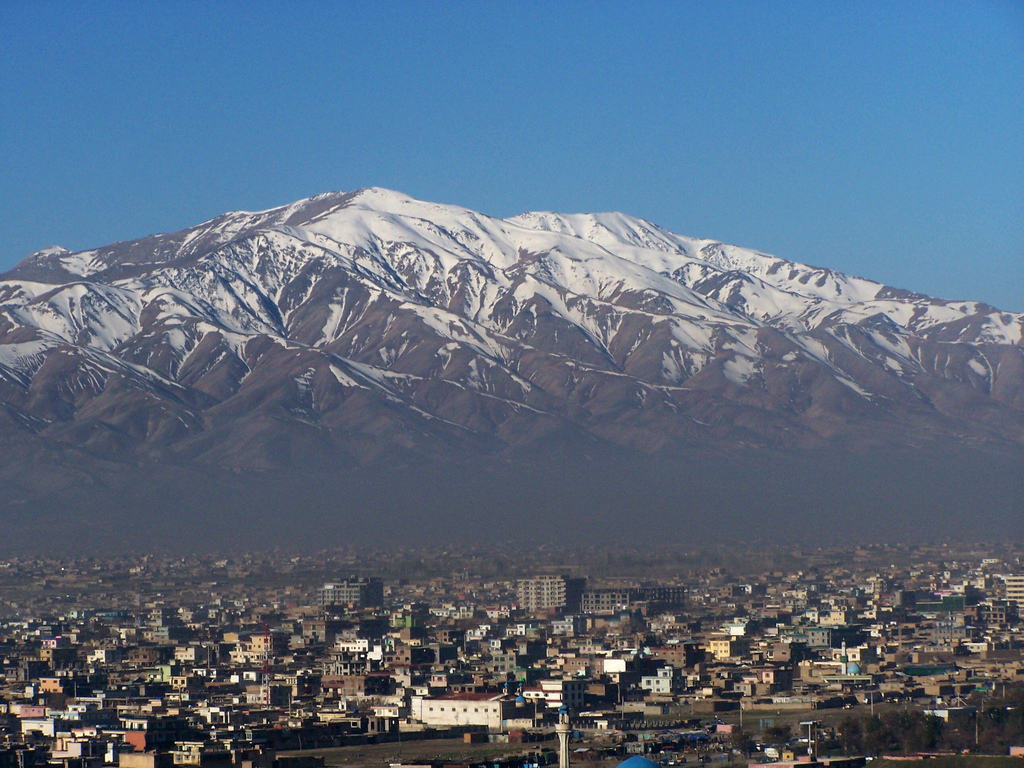
Kabul city, situated 5,900 ft above sea level in a narrow valley, wedged between the Hindu Kush mountains.

Kabul is located between Latitude 34-31' North and Longitude 69-12' East at an altitude of 1800 m (6000 feet) above sea level, which makes it one of the world's highest capital cities. Kabul is strategically situated in a valley surrounded by high mountains at crossroads of north-south and east-west trade routes. One million years ago the Kabul region was surrounded from south-east between Lowgar and Paghman Mountains; Charikar in the north and the Ningai Ghar mountains in the west. This region formed an icy sea. Some deep wells in the region of today's Poli Charkhi in the east part of city are the evidence of that time. Kabul is surrounded by Koh-e Paghman Mountain from the east, Koh-e Qrough Mountain from the south-west and Koh-e Shirdarwaza Mountain from the north-east. Kabul has only one river which is called Kabul River. Kabul River rises at the Paghman Mountain toward South Pass about 70 km (43 mi) west of Kabul. It flows in an easterly direction, past Kabul, and through Jalalabad city, and then on to Dakka where it enters Pakistani territory and finally runs into the Indus at Attock.

The climate within region of Kabul is considered to be arid to semi-arid steppe. Because of the very low amounts of precipitation, especially from May to November, Kabul can be very dry and dusty. Extreme temperature changes occur from night to day, season to season, and from place to place. The chief characteristic of Afghanistan's climate is a blue cloudless sky with over 300 days of sunshine yearly. Even during the winter, skies usually remain clear between snowfalls, which are on average 15–30 cm (5.9–11.8 in) annually. The daily temperature for Kabul city in winter is −1 °C (30 °F) and in summer 24 °C (75 °F). The coldest month of the year is January and the hottest month is July. The maximum temperature has been recorded as +42.7 °C in July and the minimum as −26.3 °C in January.

== Government and politics ==
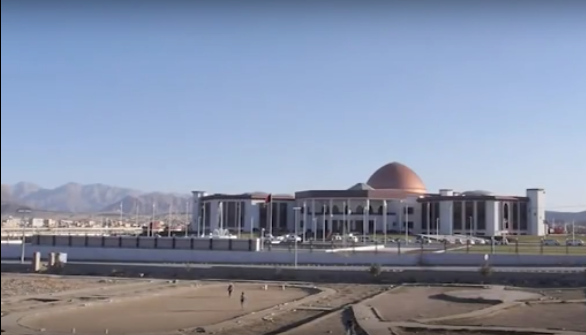
The Afghan Parliament

=== Local governance ===
Kabul was occupied by a number of mujahideen rebel groups and warlords before Najibullah's government collapsed in 1992. The city and province were contested by the various rebel forces who fought for power until it was captured by the Taliban in 1996. A new strict law was introduced by the Taliban. There was very little information on how Afghanistan was governed but the country had only one leader, Mullah Omar, the head of Taliban who fled to Pakistan after the US-led invasion on October 7, 2001. The Taliban laws were quickly abolished and humanities came in effect to enable Kabul to recover from the destruction caused by the mujahideen and Taliban forces. The 2002 loya jirga took place to solve the country's political problems.

Afghanistan adopted a new constitution in January 2004, establishing the country as an Islamic Republic. According to the constitution, the Afghan government consists of a President, two Vice Presidents, and a National Assembly (Parliament). The National Assembly has two houses: the House of People (Wolesi Jirga), and the House of Elders (Meshrano Jirga). There is also an independent Judiciary branch consisting of the Supreme Court (Stara Mahkama), High Courts and Appeal Courts. The President appoints the members of the Supreme Court with the approval of the Wolesi Jirga.

Afghanistan's presidential elections were held in October 2004. Over 8 million Afghans voted in the elections. The Joint Electoral Management Body of Afghanistan certified the elections and declared Hamid Karzai, the interim President, the winner with 55.4% of the vote. Karzai's strongest opponent, Yunus Qanuni, received 16.3% of the vote. The elections were not without controversy; allegations of fraud and ballot stuffing were brought up by many of the presidential candidates including Qanuni. A panel of international experts was set up to investigate the matter. The panel did find evidence of voting irregularities, however, they said that it was not enough to affect the outcome of the elections.

=== Administrative divisions ===
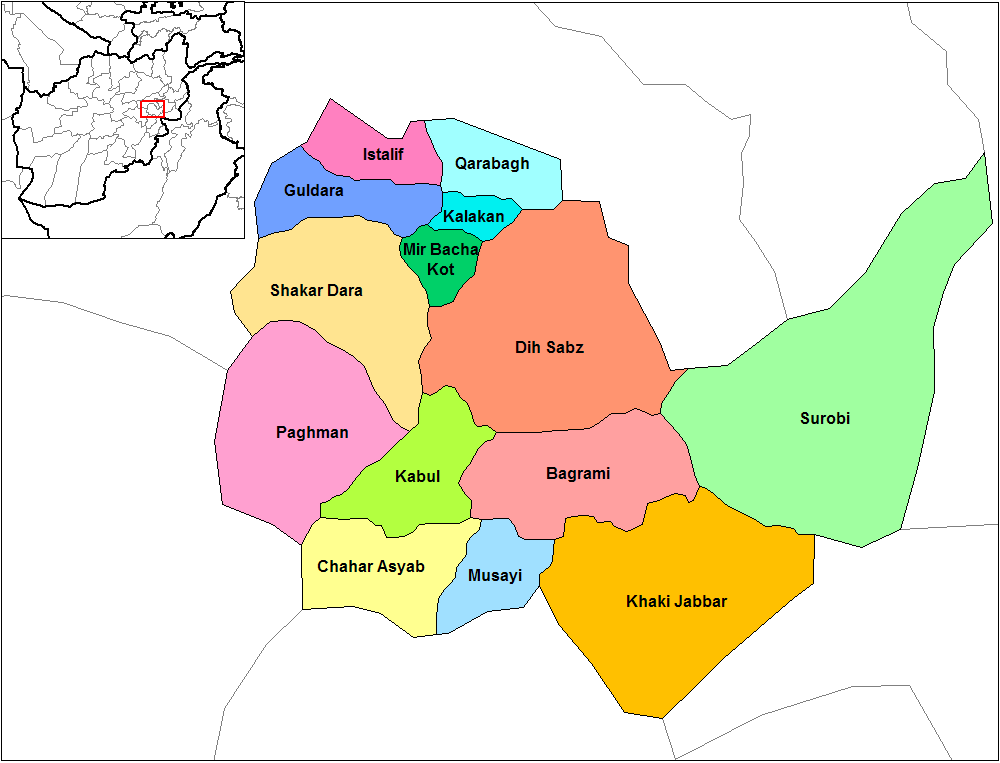
Map of the districts of Kabul as of January 2004, prior to the redrawing of provincial and district boundaries later that year

Districts of Kabul Province
District	Capital	Population Estimate 2022	Area in km^{2}	Pop. density per km^{2}	Ethnic data (%)	Notes
Bagrami	Bagrami	62,709	230	272	Pashtuns (majority), Tajik	
Chahar Asyab	Qalai Naeem	41,452	246	168	Pashtuns, Tajiks, and few Hazara	
Deh Sabz	Tarakhel	61,115	525	117	70% Pashtuns; 30% Tajiks	
Farza	Dehnawe Farza	24,313	85	287	Mix Pashtuns and Tajiks Created in 2005 from Mir Bacha Kot District	
Guldara	Guldara	25,907	84	310	70% Tajiks; 30% Pashtuns	
Istalif	Istalif	37,998	108	354	Mix of Tajik, Pashtun, and Hazara	
Kabul (city)	Kabul	4,434,550	383	11,575	45% Tajiks (5% Qizilbash), 25% Pashtuns, 25% Hazaras, 2% Uzbeks, 1% Turkmen, 1% Balochi, 1% Hindu.	
Kalakan	Kalakan	34,278	73	470	Predominantly Tajik and some Pashtuns	
Khaki Jabbar	Khak-i Jabbar	16,209	590	27	95% Pashtuns; 5% Tajiks	
Mir Bacha Kot	Mir Bacha Kot	59,122	62	956	Tajiks and some Pashtun families Split in 2005 to create a new Farza District	
Mussahi	Mussahi	26,439	119	222	Pashtuns and a number of Tajik families	
Paghman	Paghman	138,507	385	360	70% Pashtuns; 30% Tajiks	
Qarabagh	Qara Bagh	86,358	214	403	60% Tajiks; 40% Pashtuns	
Shakardara	Shakar Dara	93,001	271	344	Either majority Tajik or majority Pashtun	
Surobi	Surobi	62,709	1,314	48	90% Pashtuns; 10% Pashais	
Kabul		5,204,667	4,524	1,150	44.8% Tajiks (4.3% Qizilbash), 29.3% Pashtuns, 21.6% Hazaras, 1.7% Uzbeks, 0.9% Turkmens, 0.9% Balochi, 0.9% Hindus, 0.1% Pashai.	

== Economy ==
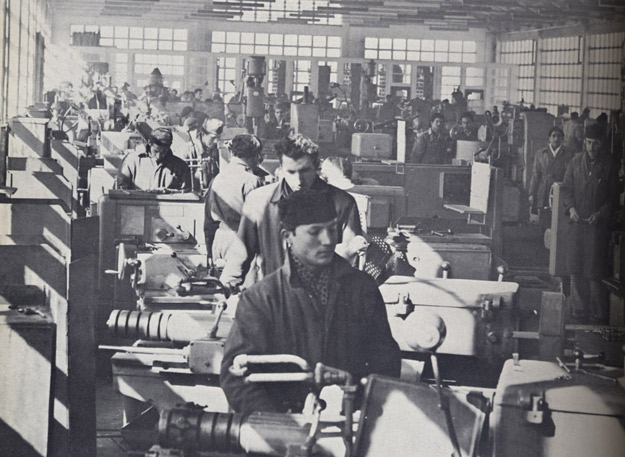
Skilled workers at a factory in Kabul, press operators are building new standards for themselves and their country. 1950

Kabul's products include: natural gas, cotton, wool, carpets, agriculture, and some small production companies. Kabul has trade partnerships with the UK, France, Germany, United States, India, South Korea, Turkmenistan, Kenya, Russia, Pakistan, China, Iran. Kabul's economy was influenced by the America and has increased by almost 3500% after shrinking for 25 years. A new currency was introduced to Afghans which helped the economy. New business was in the new regime. Many American industries were interested in the new Kabul and many new companies have since then opened their branches in Kabul. The Kabul City Centre Mall was built and has nearly 100 shops.

The economy is at a boom level and is increasing dramatically. Housing costs are rising as are employee wages. The cost of living has increased dramatically which is a problem for the non-educated Afghans, who cannot support themselves. The UN helps Afghans in need of help by providing aid, food and school materials for schools. Many international aid organizations are contributing to the Afghan economy.

=== Tourism ===
In the 1960s and 70s most of Kabul's economy depended on tourism. Kabul had textile, cotton production, and carpet production industries, but most of its economy came through tourism which it lost during its destruction.

=== Transportation ===
Transportation in Kabul is improving as the number of new vehicles and experienced drivers continues to grow. Public transportation services are available in the Kabul vicinity, but many roads are still in disrepair. Drivers also face challenges from the large number of cyclists. However, more vehicles are appearing in the city as car ownership increases. Taxis are widely available throughout Kabul, including in most districts, providing an essential mode of transport for locals and visitors.

Since the Taliban's return to power, local taxi services have improved as new roads are being constructed and public transportation infrastructure is being enhanced. Several companies are also working to further improve transportation options in the city. For instance, Tour.af, a company specializing in tourism and transportation, is planning to introduce an online taxi service to make travel within Kabul more convenient and accessible. This initiative is part of their broader efforts to support tourism and provide reliable transportation services in Afghanistan.

Kabul's Milli Bus (National Bus) system, with approximately 800 buses, continues to serve the city and nearby areas. In addition, several new highways have been constructed in the province, and the government is committed to rebuilding smaller roads. Funding for these improvements comes from toll charges paid by drivers using highways and major roads. Motorists are required to obtain inspection certificates, issued monthly, quarterly, or annually, which are displayed on vehicle windshields.

Trucks are commonly used to transport goods between districts or to other cities in the country. With the support of foreign companies and organizations, the Afghan government has initiated extensive roadwork to improve Kabul’s infrastructure. Auto companies like Honda, Toyota, Ford Motor Company, and Chevrolet have also re-entered the Kabul market, further diversifying transportation options.

== Demographics ==
=== Population ===
As of 2022, the total population of Kabul province is 5,572,630, of which about 85 percent live in the urban areas (mainly in the Kabul metropolitan area) while the remaining 15 percent are rural residents.

=== Ethnicity, languages and religion ===
Kabul is one of the most ethnically diverse provinces. It constitutes a microcosm of the country's broader ethno‑linguistic and religious diversity. The province is characterized by a highly heterogeneous population, shaped by centuries of migration, trade, conflict and urbanization, producing a complex interplay of overlapping identities.

The dominant ethnic categories in the province are Pashtuns, Tajiks and Hazaras, with smaller communities of Aimaq, Turkmens, Baloch and Qizilbash. Pashtuns, historically concentrated in the eastern and southern regions of the province and drawn from tribal networks in neighboring provinces such as Nangarhar, Khost and Paktika, are prominent both in rural settlements and in peripheral zones surrounding Kabul city. They are associated with long‑standing cultural influence in Afghanistan's political history. While Pashto is considered the ancestral language of Pashtuns, many communities in Kabul now speak Dari as their mother tongue while retaining a distinct Pashtun identity, reflecting processes of urbanization and linguistic assimilation. Among urban and politically active Pashtun groups, bilingualism is common with Dari functioning as the lingua franca. Tajiks, concentrated in central and northern districts, are predominantly Dari‑speaking and have historically engaged in mercantile, bureaucratic and educational networks, often occupying key social and economic roles within the province. Urbanization and the assimilation of other social groups, including Pashtuns and Uzbeks, particularly in the city of Kabul, have blurred distinctions between "native" Tajiks and Persianized groups, showing how linguistic practice and urban residence shape identity beyond strict ethnic categories. Hazaras, largely from the central highlands called Hazarajat, represent a significant Shia minority within the province whose communities have steadily increased through migration and displacement over the 20th and 21st centuries. They typically speak Hazaragi, a Dari dialect with Turkic and Mongolic influences, while their adherence to Twelver Shia Islam distinguishes them religiously from the Sunni majority, contributing to unique identity contours within the province. Religiously, Kabul is majority Sunni, encompassing much of the Pashtun, Tajik and Aimaq populations, while Shia communities—especially Hazara and Qizilbash—form visible and historically significant minorities. The overlapping of religious and ethnic affinities further shapes social relations in both urban and rural contexts.

The concept of a Kabuli identity emerges from these layered realities. Individuals often negotiate multiple, fluid identities simultaneously. Depending on context, a resident of Kabul may describe themselves simply as "Kabuli", emphasizing urban culture, neighborhood networks and cosmopolitan affiliation rather than ethnicity alone. This Kabuli identity is often perceived as socially and culturally distinct from rural identities, encompassing shared urban experience, multilingual social networks and modern social self‑conceptions. In other contexts, individuals may present as ethnically Pashtun, linguistically Dari‑speaking and socially "Kabuli", illustrating how migration, intermarriage, urbanization and economic integration reinforce identity flexibility, while historical memory and local origin remain salient in particular social contexts. These dynamics produce a provincial society in which boundaries of language, ethnicity and religion are permeable and adaptive, giving rise to a vibrant, hybridized identity that is rooted in tradition yet shaped by contemporary social processes.

Estimated ethnolinguistic and -religious composition
Ethnicity	Pashtun	Tajik/ Farsiwan	Hazara	Others	Sources
Period	Pashtun	Tajik/ Farsiwan	Hazara	Others	Sources

2004–2021 (Islamic Republic)	40 – 60%	≤40%	≤15%	≤5%
2020 EU	2nd	1st	3rd	–
2018 UN	majority			∅
2015 CSSF (Note: Demographic information is based on data from 2015.)	significant	significant	minority	∅ (Note: incl. Uzbek, Baloch, Aimaq, Turkmen, Arab, Pashayi, Nuristani, and others.)
2015 CP	40%	40%	15%	5% (Note: incl. Uzbek, Baloch, Hindu, and Turkmen.)
2015 NPS	∅ (Note: incl. Kuchi.)	∅	∅	∅ (Note: incl. Qizilbash, Tatar, Hindu, and Sikh.)
2011 UCD	majority		–	–
2011 PRT	60%	40%		∅ (Note: incl. Pashayi.)
2011 USA	60%	∅	∅	∅ (Note: incl. Uzbek, Baloch, Turkmen, Hindu, and Sikh.)
2009 ISW	majority		–	∅
2009 MRRD	60%	40%		∅ (Note: incl. Pashayi.)

Legend:
- ∅: Ethnicity mentioned in source but not quantified
- –: Ethnicity not mentioned specifically
- Source abbreviations: Empirical sources: –, Government sources: CP – Colombo Plan, EU – European Union Agency for Asylum, MRRD – Ministry of Rural Rehabilitation and Development, PRT – Provincial Reconstruction Team of the United States government, UN – United Nations Assistance Mission in Afghanistan, Editorial sources: CSSF – Center for the Scientific Study of Families, ISW – Institute for the Study of War, NPS – Naval Postgraduate School, UCD – University of California, Davis, (Note: Produced at UCD as part of the Regional Rural Economic Regeneration Strategies subproject of the eAfghan Ag project, supported by USAID.) USA – United States Army

=== Education ===
The overall literacy rate (6+ years of age) fell from 58% in 2005 to 47% in 2011. The overall net enrollment rate (6–13 years of age) increased from 46% in 2005 to 65% in 2011.

Kabul is Afghanistan's center for education. People from all the provinces of the country come to Kabul for education. There are many schools and universities that have opened doors for men and women. In the 1970s, about 55% of Kabul's population was educated without materials or proper learning resources, but nowadays most of the young children are sent to work by their parents to support their living costs. The education rate has declined dramatically during the last 20 years. Most of the schools in Kabul were set as battle points during the wars and have been demolished.

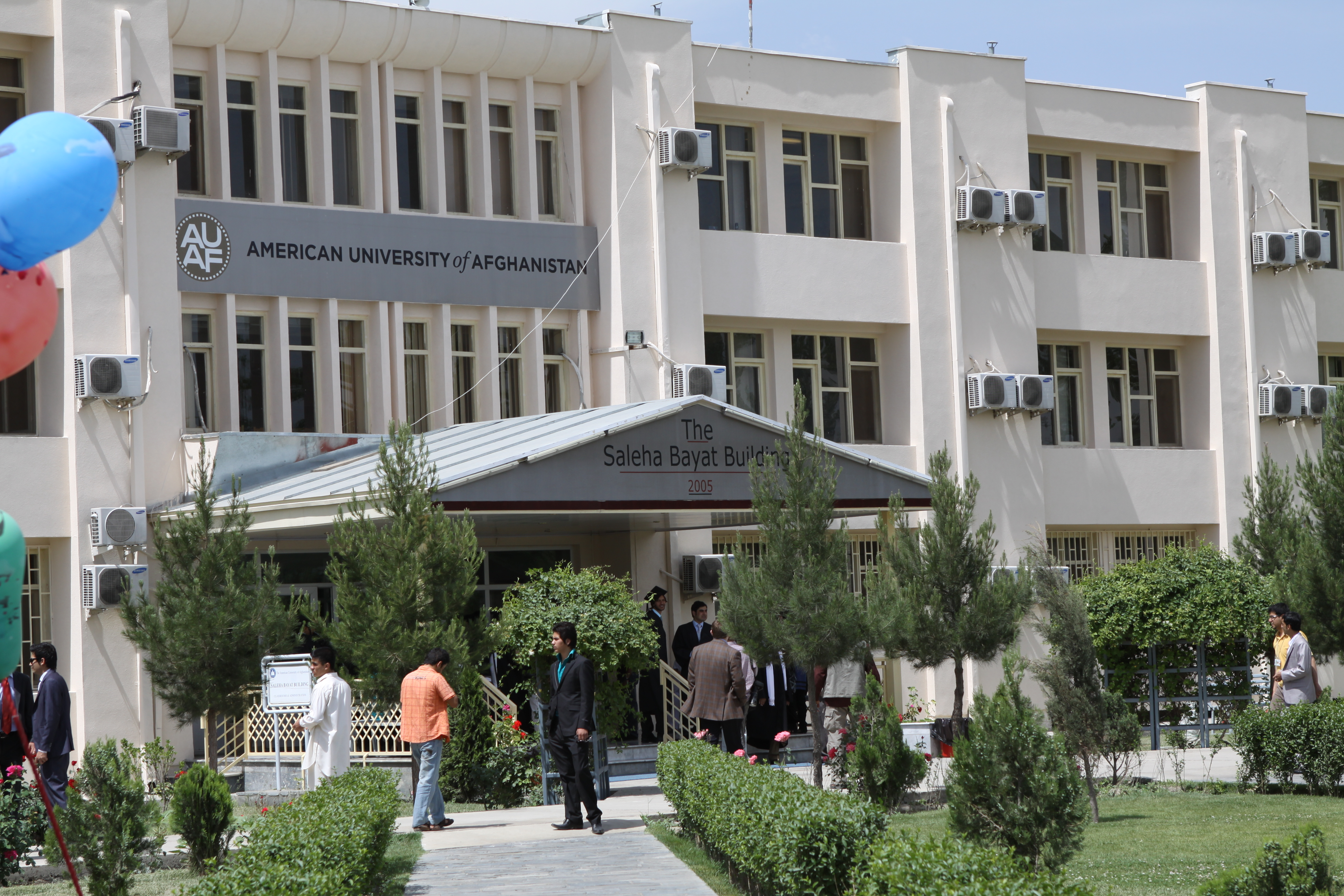
American University of Afghanistan (AUAF)

Universities and faculties include:

- Afghanistan Technical Vocational Institute
- American University of Afghanistan
- Bakhtar University
- Kabul Medical University
- Kabul University
- Kardan University
- Karwan University
- Kateb University
- Maryam University
- National Military Academy of Afghanistan
- Polytechnical University of Kabul

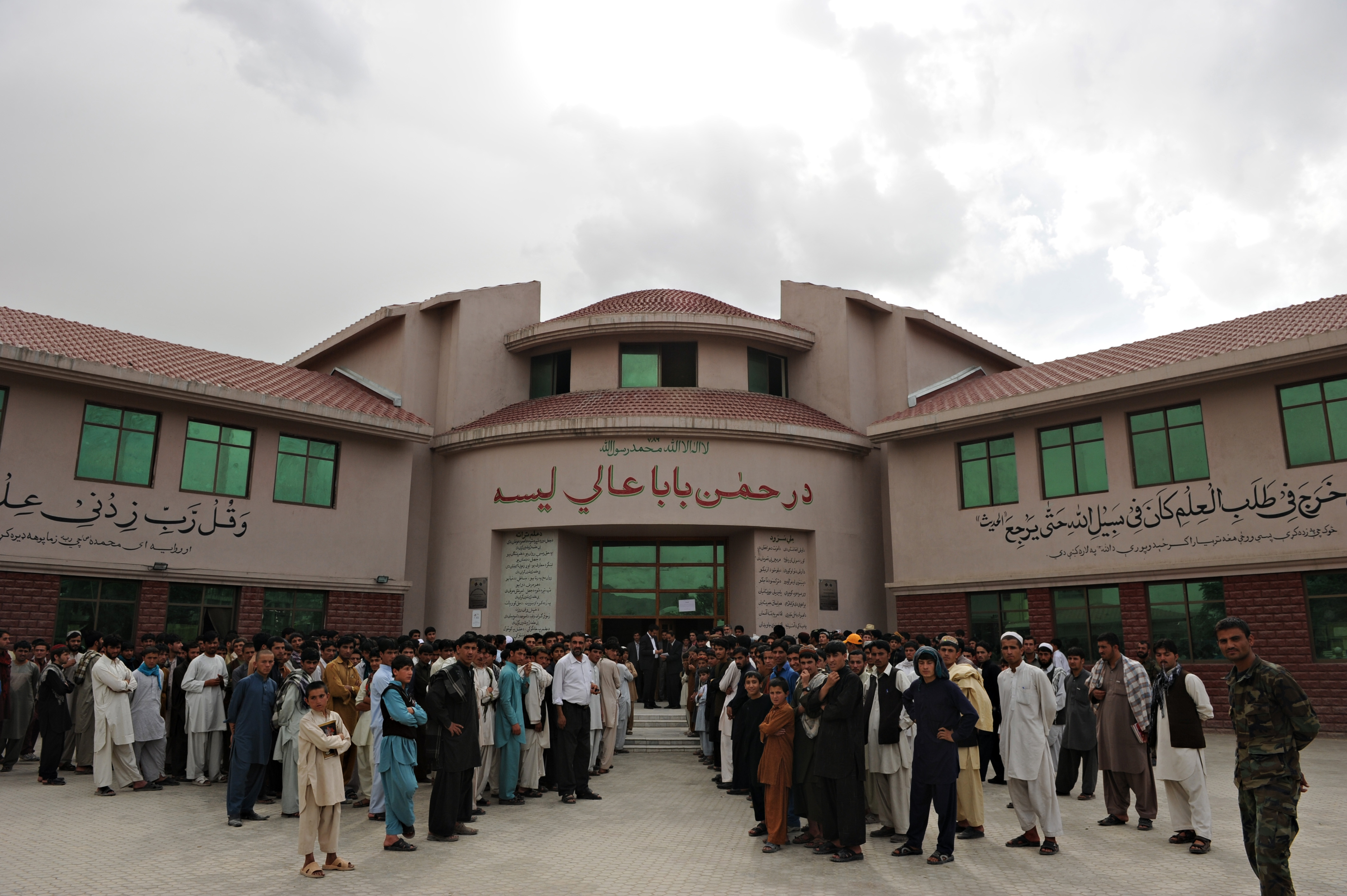
Rahman Baba High School

Schools include:

- Abdul Rahim-e-Shaheed High School (for boys and girls (Year 1-Year 6))
- Ahmad Shah Baba High School (for boys, named after Ahmad Shah Durrani)
- Aisha-i-Durani School (or Mädchengymnasium Aysha-e Durani) and Wirtschaftsgymnasium für Mädchen Jamhuriat (German-Afghan schools for girls)
- Amani High School (German-Afghan school for boys founded in 1924)
- Durkhanai High School (for girls)
- Ghazi High School (for boys, names after Amanullah Khan)
- Ghulam Haider Khan High School
- Habibia High School (British-Afghan school founded in 1904 as Habibya College)
- International School of Kabul
- Lycée Esteqlal and Lycée Malalaï (French lycées founded in 1922 and 1932 respectively)
- Malalai High School (for girls, named after Malalai Anna)
- Malika Soraya High School (for girls, named after Queen Soraya Tarzi)
- Naderia High School (For Boys)
- Nazo Ana High School (for girls, named after Nazo Tokhi)
- Raman Baba High School (for boys, named after Rahman Baba)
- Sultana Razia High School (for girls)

=== Health ===
The percentage of households with clean drinking water fell from 65% in 2005 to 56% in 2011. The percentage of births attended to by a skilled birth attendant increased from 46% in 2005 to 73% in 2011.

== Sports ==
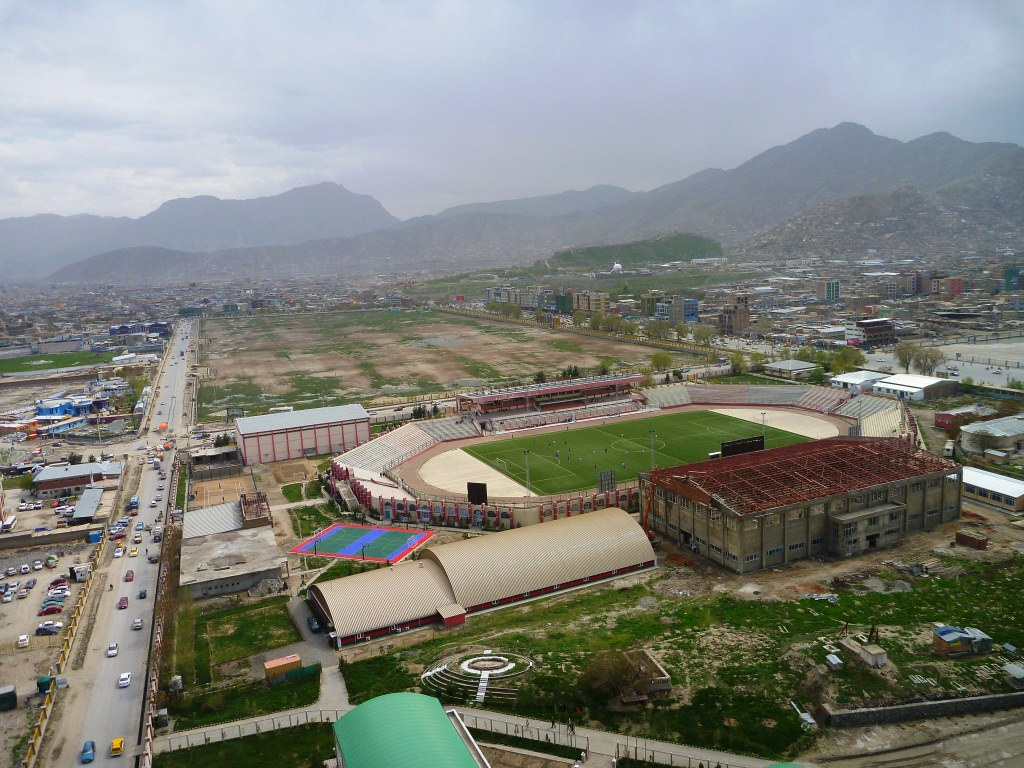
Ghazi Stadium in the city of Kabul

Kabul is the center of annual buzkashi Cricket and football tournaments, where teams from all over of Afghanistan, and sometimes from neighboring Pakistan, Iran, Uzbekistan, and Tajikistan participate. Sports is a daily routine for employees in Afghanistan, when they all join each other in tournaments and matches, specially soccer games. Golf is played at the Kabul Golf Club, which is a short drive from the capital near the Qargha water park. Cricket is the number-one sport in Afghanistan with big achievements. Annual cricket tournament happen under the name of Shpagizz and from all over Afghanistan teams attend in this tournament. Afghanistan cricket team has participated in world cups. Afghanistan national football team also participated in many Asian Soccer Leagues. Many Afghans who were living as refugees in Pakistan and India repatriated, and they brought the game of cricket with them. Afghanistan now has a national cricket team that plays internationally. The Province itself is represented in Afghan domestic cricket by the Kabul Province cricket team, who were the inaugural winners of the 2010 Etisalat 50 over tournament.

There are also basketball, volleyball, golf, handball, boxing, taekwondo, weightlifting, bodybuilding, track and field, skating, bowling, snooker, and chess, teams in Kabul, which participate in tournaments locally and go on tours to other Asian countries. One of the oldest and most popular stadiums in Kabul is the Ghazi Stadium, where tournaments, concerts, and national celebrations take place. The Kabul National Cricket Stadium is under construction as of 2011. The Ghazi Stadium is also currently going through a reconstruction programme whereby a new design and a new system will be established for the stadium. Schools and universities encourage participation in team sports, and Afghans are being trained in Kabul for the next Olympic Games.

== See also ==
- Provinces of Afghanistan
- Kabul City
- Kabulistan
