= Berthiaume =

Berthiaume is a surname. Notable people with the surname include:

- Daniel Berthiaume (born 1966), Canadian retired professional ice hockey goaltender
- Daniel Berthiaume (singer, songwriter), born in Montreal, Canada
- Raymond Berthiaume (1931–2009), Canadian jazz singer, musician, producer and composer
- René Berthiaume (born 1952), Canadian politician, who was elected mayor of Hawkesbury, Ontario in the 2010 municipal election
- Steve Berthiaume (born 1965), Current Arizona Diamondbacks announcer and a former sportscaster for SportsNet New York (SNY) and ESPN
- Trefflé Berthiaume (1848–1915), Canadian typographer, newspaperman and politician

== See also ==
- Berthiaume-du-Tremblay Stadium, outdoor football and soccer stadium in Parc Berthiaume-Du-Tremblay in Chomedey, a suburb of Laval, Quebec
- Parc Berthiaume-du-Tremblay, park located in Chomedey, a suburb of Laval, Quebec, Canada a short distance from Montreal Island
- Berthiaume Lake (Métascouac River), a water body crossed by the Métascouac River, in Lac-Jacques-Cartier, La Côte-de-Beaupré, Capitale-Nationale, in Quebec, to Canada.
