= Jabbar =

Jabbar (Arabic: جبار) is an Arabic word meaning "great" or "mighty". With the definite article as al-Jabbar (Arabic: الجبار) it is one of the names of God in Islam, and is so used in the given name Abd al-Jabbar (Arabic: عبد الجبار).

== Al-Jabbar as surname ==
- Abdul Jalilul Jabbar (ruled 1649–1652), Sultan of Brunei
- Abdul-Karim al-Jabbar (born 1974), American footballer

== Jabbar as given name ==
- Jabbar Baghtcheban (1884–1966), Iranian worker with the deaf
- Jabbar Choheili (1923–2014), Iranian Mandaean priest
- Jabbar Garyagdioglu (1861–1944), Azerbaijani folk singer
- Jabbar Muhammad (born 2001), American football player
- Jabbar Patel (born 1942), Indian theatre and film director
- Jabbar Savalan (born ca. 1991), Azerbaijani blogger
- Jawad Jabbar Sadkhan Al-Sahlani, Iraqi held in Guantanamo

== Jabbar as surname ==
- Abdoul Jabbar (1980–2021), Guinean singer-songwriter
- Abdul Jabbar (activist) (1919–1952), Bengali-language demonstrator
- Abdul Jabbar (footballer) (1945–2014), Pakistani footballer
- Hussein Jabbar (born 1998), Iraqi footballer
- Javed Jabbar, Pakistani writer and politician
- Kareem Abdul-Jabbar (born 1947), American basketball player
- Maitham Jabbar (born 2000), Iraqi footballer
- Mehreen Jabbar (born 1971), Pakistani filmmaker, daughter of Javed
- Mudhafar Jabbar (born 1965), Iraqi footballer
- Mustafa Jabbar (born 1949), Bangladeshi businessman and politician
- Parvais Jabbar, British human rights activist
- Pat Jabbar, music producer
- Sadia Jabbar, Pakistani television and film producer
- Shamsud-Din Bahar Jabbar, suspect in the 2025 New Orleans truck attack
- Sheikh Abdul Jabbar (1931–1990), Indian politician and freedom fighter from Jammu and Kashmir
- T H Abdul Jabbar (born 1960), Indian politician from Kerala
- Yaser Jabbar, orthopaedic surgeon

== Other uses ==
- Al Jabbar Grand Mosque, a mosque located in West Java, Indonesia
- Al-Jabbar, the Arabic name of the constellation Orion
- Jabbar Khel, Afghan clan
- Khak-i Jabbar, village in Afghanistan
  - Khaki Jabbar District, Afghanistan
- Jabbar, Khuzestan, a village in Khuzestan Province, Iran
- Jabbar, Razavi Khorasan, a village in Razavi Khorasan Province, Iran
- Jabbar, alternate name of Kalateh-ye Jabbar, a village in Razavi Khorasan Province, Iran
- Jabbar, South Khorasan, a village in South Khorasan Province, Iran

== Fictional uses ==
- Jabbar (The 99), a character in The 99 comics
- Gom jabbar, a weapon from the Dune universe

== See also ==
- Abdul Jabbar
- Jabari
- Jabber (disambiguation)
