= Gabber (disambiguation) =

Gabber is the style of electronic dance music and a subgenre of hardcore techno, as well as the surrounding subculture.

Gabber or gabbers may also refer to:

- Gabber (instant messaging client), a free software and open-source GNOME client for instant messaging XMPP network.
- Gabbers, nickname for English footballer Marco Gabbiadini
- Ofer Gabber, a French mathematician.

== See also ==
- Gab (disambiguation)
- Gabba (disambiguation)
- Jabber (disambiguation)
