= Jabbari =

Jabbari is a surname. Notable people with the surname include:

- Ali Jabbari (born 1946), Iranian footballer
- Ayoub Jabbari (born 2000), Moroccan footballer
- Babak Jabbari (born 1994), Iranian footballer
- Esmaiel Jabbari (born 1961), Iranian chemical engineer
- Gelareh Jabbari, Iranian activitst, actress and TV host
- Mahour Jabbari (born 2000), Iranian actress
- Mahyar Jabbari (born 1998), Iranian footballer
- Mojtaba Jabbari (born 1983), Iranian footballer
- Reyhaneh Jabbari (1988-2014), Iranian woman executed for murder
- Reza Jabbari (born 1977), Iranian footballer
