= Black Panther (film) =

2018 Marvel Studios film

- Theatrical release poster
- Directed by: Ryan Coogler
- Written by: Ryan Coogler; Joe Robert Cole
- Based on: Black Panther by: Stan Lee; Jack Kirby
- Produced by: Kevin Feige
- Starring: Chadwick Boseman; Michael B. Jordan; Lupita Nyong'o; Danai Gurira; Martin Freeman; Daniel Kaluuya; Letitia Wright; Winston Duke; Sterling K. Brown; Angela Bassett; Forest Whitaker; Andy Serkis
- Cinematography: Rachel Morrison
- Edited by: Michael P. Shawver; Debbie Berman
- Music by: Ludwig Göransson
- Production company: Marvel Studios
- Distributed by: Walt Disney Studios Motion Pictures
- Release dates: January 29, 2018 (Dolby Theatre); February 16, 2018 (United States)
- Running time: 134 minutes
- Country: United States
- Language: English
- Budget: $200 million
- Box office: $1.35 billion

Black Panther is a 2018 American superhero film based on the Marvel Comics character T'Challa / Black Panther. Produced by Marvel Studios and distributed by Walt Disney Studios Motion Pictures, it is the 18th film in the Marvel Cinematic Universe (MCU). The film was directed by Ryan Coogler from a screenplay he wrote with Joe Robert Cole, and stars Chadwick Boseman as T'Challa / Black Panther alongside Michael B. Jordan, Lupita Nyong'o, Danai Gurira, Martin Freeman, Daniel Kaluuya, Letitia Wright, Winston Duke, Sterling K. Brown, Angela Bassett, Forest Whitaker, and Andy Serkis. In the film, T'Challa is crowned king of the African nation Wakanda following his father's death, but he is soon challenged for the throne by Killmonger (Jordan), who plans to abandon Wakanda's isolationist policies and use the country's resources to begin a global revolution.

Wesley Snipes planned to make a Black Panther film in 1992, but the project did not come to fruition. In September 2005, Marvel Studios listed a Black Panther film as one of ten films based on Marvel characters intended to be distributed by Paramount Pictures. Mark Bailey was hired to write a script in January 2011. Black Panther was officially announced in October 2014, and Boseman made his first appearance as the character in the MCU film Captain America: Civil War (2016). Cole and Coogler had joined by then, with additional casting revealed throughout 2016. Black Panther was the first Marvel Studios film with a Black director and a predominantly Black cast. Principal photography took place from January to April 2017 at EUE/Screen Gems Studios in the Atlanta metropolitan area, and on location in Busan, South Korea.

Black Panther premiered at the Dolby Theatre in Los Angeles on January 29, 2018, and was released in the United States on February 16 as part of Phase Three of the MCU. Critics praised its direction, writing, acting (particularly that of Boseman, Jordan, and Wright), costume design, production values, and soundtrack, but some criticized the visual effects. Many critics considered it to be one of the best MCU films, and it was noted for its cultural significance. The National Board of Review and the American Film Institute named Black Panther one of the top-ten films of 2018. It grossed over $1.3 billion worldwide and broke numerous box office records, becoming the highest-grossing film directed by a Black filmmaker, the ninth-highest-grossing film at the time of its release, the third-highest-grossing film in the U.S. and Canada that year, and the second-highest-grossing film of 2018.

Black Panther was nominated for seven awards at the 91st Academy Awards, winning three, and received numerous other accolades. It was the first superhero film to receive a Best Picture nomination, and the first MCU film to win an Academy Award. A sequel, Black Panther: Wakanda Forever, was released in November 2022, with Wright taking over as the lead following Boseman's death in 2020. A third film is scheduled for release in December 2028. An animated series, Eyes of Wakanda, was released in August 2025 on Disney+.

== Plot ==
Thousands of years ago, five African tribes warred over a meteorite containing the metal vibranium. One warrior ingests a "heart-shaped herb" affected by the metal and gains superhuman abilities, becoming the first "Black Panther". He unites all but the Jabari Tribe to form the nation of Wakanda. Over centuries, the Wakandans use vibranium to develop advanced technologies and isolate themselves from the world by posing as an underdeveloped country. In 1992, Wakandan king T'Chaka visits his brother N'Jobu, who is working undercover in Oakland, California. T'Chaka accuses N'Jobu of assisting black-market arms dealer Ulysses Klaue with stealing vibranium from Wakanda. N'Jobu's partner reveals he is Zuri, another undercover Wakandan, and confirms T'Chaka's suspicions.

In the present day, following T'Chaka's death, (Note: As depicted in Captain America: Civil War (2016)) his son T'Challa returns to Wakanda to assume the throne. He and Okoye, leader of the Dora Milaje, extract T'Challa's ex-lover Nakia from an undercover assignment so she can attend his coronation ceremony with his mother Ramonda and younger sister Shuri. At the ceremony, the Jabari Tribe's leader M'Baku challenges T'Challa for the crown in ritual combat without the benefit of the heart-shaped herb. T'Challa defeats M'Baku, and persuades him to yield rather than die.

When Klaue and his accomplice Erik Stevens steal a Wakandan artifact from a London museum, T'Challa's friend and Okoye's husband W'Kabi urges him to bring Klaue back alive. T'Challa, Okoye, and Nakia travel to Busan, South Korea, where Klaue plans to sell the artifact to CIA agent Everett K. Ross. A firefight erupts, and Klaue attempts to flee but is caught by T'Challa, who reluctantly releases him to Ross's custody. Klaue tells Ross that Wakanda's international image is a front for a technologically advanced civilization. When Erik attacks to extract Klaue, Ross is gravely injured protecting Nakia. Rather than pursue Klaue, T'Challa takes Ross to Wakanda, where their technology can save him.

While Shuri tends to Ross, T'Challa confronts Zuri about N'Jobu, since Erik wore a necklace that belonged to him. Zuri explains that N'Jobu had become disillusioned with Wakanda's isolationism and planned to share Wakanda's technology with people of African descent to help them overcome their oppressors, with Klaue's assistance. Before T'Chaka could apprehend N'Jobu, N'Jobu attacked Zuri, forcing T'Chaka to kill him. T'Chaka instructed Zuri to claim that N'Jobu had vanished and to leave behind N'Jobu's American son, N'Jadaka, to uphold the story. This boy grew up to become Erik, a U.S. black ops Navy SEAL who took on the nickname "Killmonger". Meanwhile, Killmonger kills Klaue and brings his body to Wakanda. He is presented before the tribal elders, revealing himself as N'Jadaka and asserting his claim to the throne. Killmonger challenges T'Challa to ritual combat, severely injures him, and kills Zuri, while T'Challa is presumed dead after Killmonger throws him over a waterfall. Killmonger ingests the heart-shaped herb and orders the rest to be incinerated, but Nakia manages to extract one. Killmonger, backed by W'Kabi and his army, prepares to distribute shipments of Wakandan weapons to operatives worldwide.

Nakia, Shuri, Ramonda, and Ross flee to the Jabari Tribe for aid. They find a comatose T'Challa, rescued by the Jabari as repayment for sparing M'Baku's life. Healed by Nakia's herb, T'Challa returns to fight Killmonger, who also dons a nanotech suit similar to T'Challa's. W'Kabi and his army fight Shuri, Nakia, and the Dora Milaje, while Ross remotely pilots a jet and shoots down the planes carrying vibranium weapons before they can leave Wakanda. M'Baku and the Jabari arrive to reinforce T'Challa. Confronted by Okoye, W'Kabi and his army stand down. Fighting in Wakanda's vibranium mine, T'Challa disrupts Killmonger's suit and stabs him. Killmonger refuses to be healed, choosing to die as a free man rather than be incarcerated; T'Challa shows him the Wakanda sunset, and Killmonger dies peacefully.

T'Challa establishes an outreach center at the building where N'Jobu died, to be run by Nakia and Shuri. In a mid-credits scene, T'Challa appears before the United Nations to reveal Wakanda's true nature to the world. In a post-credits scene, Shuri helps Bucky Barnes with his rehabilitation.

== Cast ==
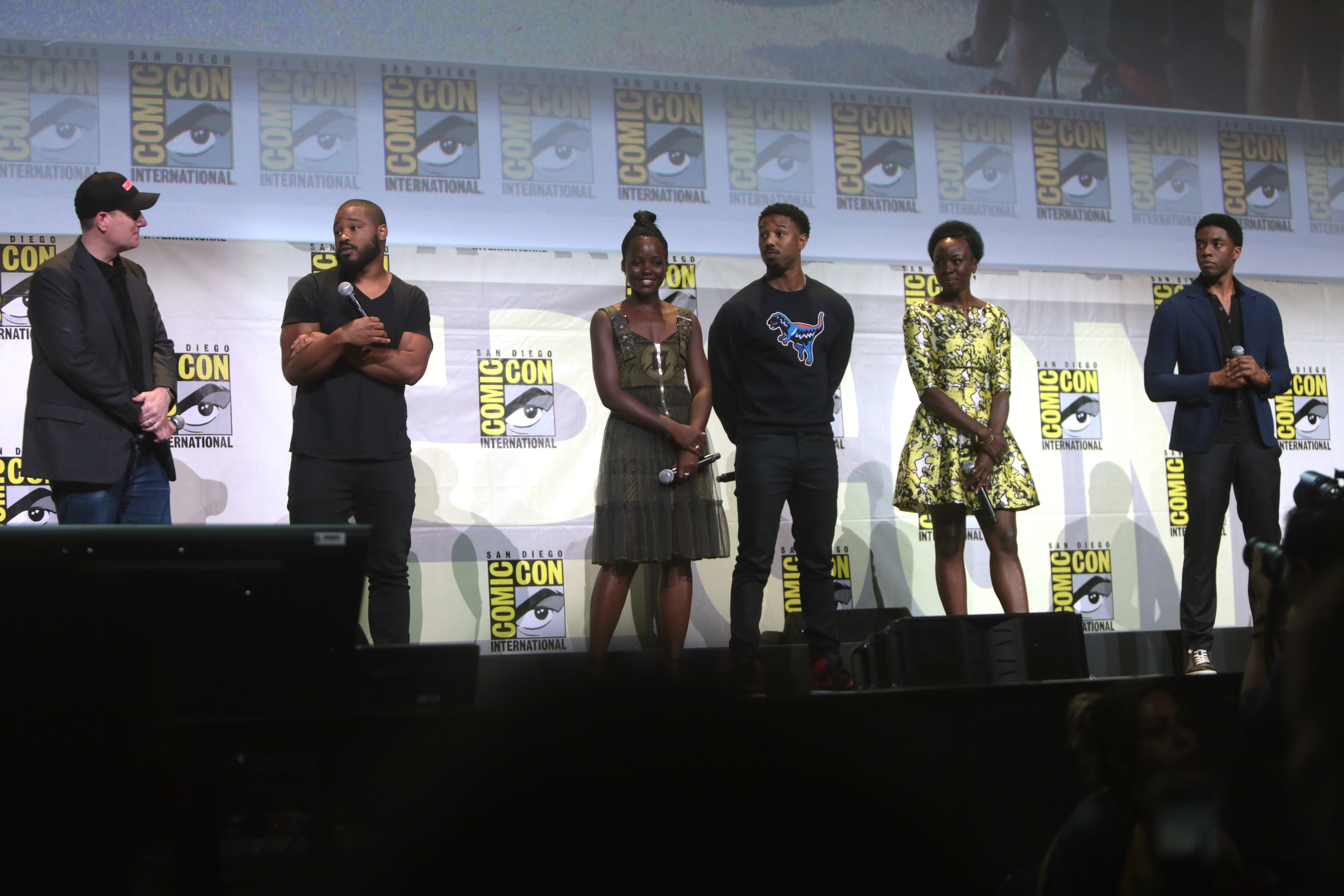
(L:R) Producer Kevin Feige, director Ryan Coogler, and actors Lupita Nyong'o, Michael B. Jordan, Danai Gurira, and Chadwick Boseman promoting Black Panther at the 2016 San Diego Comic-Con

- Chadwick Boseman as T'Challa / Black Panther:
  The king of the African nation of Wakanda who gains superhuman abilities by ingesting the heart-shaped herb. He ascends to the throne following the death of his father T'Chaka in the film Captain America: Civil War (2016). Boseman called T'Challa an anti-hero who is "very much aware" of his responsibility as the leader of Wakanda. Black Panther's suit, which forms around his body, was inspired by a similar design by artist Brian Stelfreeze in Ta-Nehisi Coates's comic book series Black Panther: A Nation Under Our Feet. For his Wakandan accent, Boseman worked with the same dialect coach he had for the film Message from the King (2016), and worked with Marrese Crump to stay in shape between Civil War and Black Panther. To prepare for the role, Boseman visited South Africa twice; examined Shaka Zulu, Patrice Lumumba, speeches from Nelson Mandela, and Fela Kuti songs; talked to a Yoruba Babalawo; trained in Dambe, Capoeira Angola, and Zulu stick fighting; and took a DNA test to better understand his African ancestry. He signed a five-film contract with Marvel, beginning with Civil War. Ashton Tyler plays a young T'Challa.
- Michael B. Jordan as N'Jadaka / Erik "Killmonger" Stevens:
  A black ops mercenary and former U.S. Navy SEAL who seeks to overthrow his cousin T'Challa and enforce his own opinion on how Wakanda should be ruled. Jordan had wanted to play a villain for "a while", and likened Killmonger and T'Challa's relationship to the X-Men characters Magneto and Professor X. He added that Killmonger is strategic, thoughtful, patient, and "trained to a T". Killmonger's bumpy, ritualistic tribal markings on his chest and torso resemble the scar tattoos of the Mursi and Surma tribes, and consisted of 90 individually sculpted silicone molds that took two-and-a-half hours to apply. Jordan would have to sit in a sauna for two hours at the end of the day to remove the prosthetics. Killmonger's dreadlocks hairstyle was a modern take on the character's long hair in the comics. To prepare for the role, Jordan studied Malcolm X, Marcus Garvey, Huey P. Newton, Fred Hampton, and Tupac Shakur. He also cited Heath Ledger's portrayal of the Joker in the film The Dark Knight (2008) as an influence. Corey Calliet, who had previously worked with Jordan on the film Creed (2015), served as his trainer. Seth Carr plays a young Stevens.
- Lupita Nyong'o as Nakia:
  T'Challa's former lover and a War Dog, an undercover spy for Wakanda, from the River Tribe. Nyong'o called Nakia a "departure" from her comic counterpart. She begins the film fighting for enslaved women in Nigeria. Nyong'o trained in judo, jujitsu, silat, and Filipino martial arts.
- Danai Gurira as Okoye:
  An "extremely proud" Wakandan traditionalist from the Border Tribe who is the head of the Dora Milaje, Wakanda's all-female special forces and T'Challa's bodyguards. Director Ryan Coogler cast Gurira based on her performance in Mother of George (2013), rather than her popular role of Michonne in the television series The Walking Dead, which Coogler had not seen. Gurira said that the fighting skills she learned playing Michonne complemented the skills of Okoye, but noted that the Dora Milaje are a secret service, which covers intel as well as fighting. She explained that though the character is stoic, "she also has an unexpected sense of humor. She has a heart, but for her country and for her people." Gurira's head was re-shaved every day to have her head tattoos applied, which took two-and-a-half to three-and-a-half hours.
- Martin Freeman as Everett K. Ross:
  A member of the Central Intelligence Agency whom Freeman described as having an "uneasy peace" with T'Challa. He added that the character goes on an "enlightening journey to Wakanda" in the film. Freeman and the filmmakers sought to depict Ross as a capable agent rather than just comic relief as he is in the comics.
- Daniel Kaluuya as W'Kabi: A confidant to T'Challa and Okoye's husband who is the head of security for the Border Tribe, serving as the first line of defense for Wakanda.
- Letitia Wright as Shuri:
  T'Challa's 16-year-old sister who designs new technology for the country. Wright described Shuri as innovative of spirit and mind, wanting to take Wakanda to "a new place", and felt she was a good role model for young Black girls. Executive producer Nate Moore called Shuri the smartest person in the world, even more so than Tony Stark.
- Winston Duke as M'Baku:
  A powerful, ruthless warrior who is the leader of Wakanda's mountain tribe, the Jabari, who protest T'Challa being the new king. Duke described the Jabari as people who "strongly believe that to move forward, you have to have a strong adherence and respect for the past. So they have a deep moral conscience." Character elements from Christopher Priest's 1998–2003 Black Panther series were adapted for M'Baku's portrayal in the film. M'Baku is not referred to in the film by his comics alter ego "Man-Ape", since Marvel felt there were "a lot of racial implications that don't sit well" in having a Black character dress up as an ape. This aspect of the character was instead reworked to have the Jabari tribe worship the gorilla gods, with M'Baku still wearing elements of fur on his arms and legs and a chest-plate that hints at the gorilla. Moore continued, "Man-Ape is a problematic character for a lot of reasons, but the idea behind Man-Ape we thought was really fascinating ... It's a line I think we're walking, and hopefully walking successfully." To further differentiate the Jabari, Duke spoke a version of the Nigerian Igbo language rather than the Xhosa language spoken by other Wakandans.
- Sterling K. Brown as N'Jobu: T'Chaka's brother and Killmonger's father.
- Angela Bassett as Ramonda:
  T'Challa and Shuri's mother, the Queen Mother of Wakanda. Ramonda serves as an adviser to T'Challa for when he would otherwise have turned to his father. Bassett wore a silver, waist-length wig for the role that was made from 120 pieces of hair hand-rolled into dreadlocks. Calliet also served as Bassett's trainer before and during filming, creating high-intensity interval training circuits and helping to craft her diet.
- Forest Whitaker as Zuri:
  An elder statesman of Wakanda and the keeper of the heart-shaped herb. Coogler called Zuri a religious and spiritual figure, referencing the spirituality of Wakanda from the comics, and compared him to Obi-Wan Kenobi from the Star Wars series. Zuri is also a "major tie back" to T'Chaka for T'Challa. Denzel Whitaker, who is not related to Forest, plays a young Zuri.
- Andy Serkis as Ulysses Klaue:
  A South African black-market arms dealer, smuggler and gangster who is allied with Killmonger. Klaue uses a segment of advanced Wakandan mining equipment as a sonic disruptor arm-cannon that serves to replace his left arm, which was lost in Avengers: Age of Ultron (2015). Boseman described Klaue as a threat to Wakanda, one of the few outsiders to enter the country, and someone with access to vibranium. He compared the character to Osama bin Laden. Serkis added that in addition to his desire for vibranium, Klaue is motivated by a "personal" vendetta against T'Challa, and "to expose what he thinks is the hypocrisy of Wakanda".

Additionally, Florence Kasumba and John Kani reprise their respective roles of Ayo and T'Chaka from Captain America: Civil War; Kani's son Atandwa Kani portrays a young T'Chaka. Wakandan elders in the film include Isaach de Bankolé for the River Tribe, Connie Chiume for the Mining Tribe, Dorothy Steel for the Merchant Tribe, and Danny Sapani for the Border Tribe. Sydelle Noel appears as Xoliswa, a member of the Dora Milaje. Marija Abney, Janeshia Adams-Ginyard, Maria Hippolyte, Marie Mouroum, Jénel Stevens, Zola Williams, Christine Hollingsworth, and Shaunette Renée Wilson also play Doras. Nabiyah Be initially announced that she was playing criminal Tilda Johnson, but her character was simply named Linda in the final film due to Gabrielle Dennis being cast as Johnson in the second season of Luke Cage. Comedian Trevor Noah voices Griot, a Wakandan ship A.I., Black Panther co-creator Stan Lee has a cameo as a patron in the South Korean casino, and Sebastian Stan makes an uncredited appearance in the post-credits scene reprising his role as Bucky Barnes, now named the White Wolf.

== Production ==
=== Development ===
In June 1992, Wesley Snipes announced his intention to make a film about Black Panther, and began work on it by that August. Snipes felt that Africa had been portrayed poorly in Hollywood films previously, and that this film could highlight the majesty of the continent due to the title character being noble and "the antithesis of [African] stereotypes". The next July, Snipes planned to begin The Black Panther after starring in Demolition Man (1993), and a month later he expressed interest in making sequels to the film as well. In January 1994, Snipes entered talks with Columbia Pictures to portray Black Panther, and Black Panther co-creator Stan Lee joined the film by March; it entered early development by May. Snipes had discussions with several different screenwriters and directors about the project, including Mario Van Peebles and John Singleton. When the film had not progressed by January 1996, Lee explained that he had not been pleased with the scripts for the project. Snipes said that one of the issues with the project's development was confusion among those unfamiliar with the comics, who thought the film was about the Black Panther Party.

We've yet to have a major Black comic book hero on the screen. Especially the Black Panther, which is such a rich, interesting life. It's a dream come true to originate something [like] that.

— Actor Wesley Snipes, who worked on early iterations of Black Panther

In July 1997, Black Panther was listed as part of Marvel Comics' film slate, and in March 1998, Marvel reportedly hired Joe Quesada and Jimmy Palmiotti, who at the time were editors of the Black Panther comics, to work on it; Quesada and Palmiotti have both denied this. That August, corporate problems at Marvel put the project on hold. A year later, Snipes was set to produce, and possibly star, in the film, while Artisan Entertainment announced a deal with Marvel in May 2000 to co-produce, finance, and distribute the film. In March 2002, Snipes planned to make the film or Blade 3 (2004) over the next year. In July 2004, Blade 3 director David S. Goyer stated that he felt Snipes starring as Black Panther in addition to Marvel's Blade "might be overkill".

In September 2005, Marvel chairman and CEO Avi Arad announced Black Panther as one of ten films being developed by the new Marvel Studios. Marvel Studios received financing to produce the slate of ten films to be distributed by Paramount Pictures. In June 2006, Snipes said he hoped to have a director for the project soon, and Marvel Studios president Kevin Feige reiterated in February 2007 that Black Panther was in development. By that July, Singleton had been approached to direct the film. Two months earlier, Fantastic Four (2005) director Tim Story expressed his interest in casting Djimon Hounsou as Black Panther if he were to direct another Fantastic Four film after Fantastic Four: Rise of the Silver Surfer (2007), but a third Fantastic Four film helmed by Story went unproduced. In March 2009, Marvel hired writers to help come up with creative ways to launch its lesser-known properties, including Black Panther; Nate Moore, the head of the writers program, was overseeing the development of Black Panther specifically. Snipes's involvement stalled at this time, as he was convicted of failing to file a tax return, serving his sentence from June 2010 to April 2013. In January 2011, Marvel Studios hired documentary filmmaker Mark Bailey to write a script for Black Panther, to be produced by Feige. By October 2013, the metal vibranium, which comes from Black Panther's home nation Wakanda, was introduced in the Marvel Cinematic Universe; Marvel had considered showing Wakanda itself as early as Iron Man 2 (2010), but were waiting until they had "a full idea" of how to depict it.

In October 2014, Feige announced that Black Panther would be released on November 3, 2017, with Chadwick Boseman cast as T'Challa / Black Panther. Boseman did not audition for the role, instead discussing what he wanted to do with the part with Marvel, and earned $2 million for appearing in the film. The actor was set to first portray the character in Captain America: Civil War (2016). Snipes gave his support for the project, despite no longer being involved. Feige said that Marvel was considering minority writers and directors for the film, but would prioritize "the best filmmakers, the best writers, the best directors possible. So I'm not going to say for sure that we're going to hire from any one demographic". He added that they had met with former Black Panther comics writer Reginald Hudlin. In January 2015, Boseman said that the film was going through a "brainstorming phase", and the next month Marvel pushed back the release date to July 6, 2018. Also in February, Feige stated that casting for the film was underway, and added that he was set to meet with directors about the film following the release of Avengers: Age of Ultron (2015) at the end of April.

By May 2015, Marvel had discussions with Ava DuVernay to work on either Black Panther or Captain Marvel (2019) as director. In June, Feige confirmed that he had met with several directors, including DuVernay, and said that he expected a decision to be made by mid- to late 2015. By early July, DuVernay had passed on directing the film, explaining that she had been drawn to the cultural importance of depicting a Black hero to the whole world, but disagreed with Marvel on the story and did not want to compromise her vision. By October 2015, F. Gary Gray and Ryan Coogler had been considered as directors for the film, though negotiations with Coogler had cooled, and Gray had chosen to direct The Fate of the Furious (2017) instead. Joe Robert Cole, a member of the Marvel writers program, was in talks to write the screenplay, and Marvel changed the release date once again, moving it to February 16, 2018. By December, discussions with Coogler were reignited after the successful opening of his film Creed (2015).

=== Pre-production ===
Coogler was confirmed as director in January 2016, and said that the film was his "most personal movie to date" in part because he grew up reading comics, adding, "I feel really fortunate to be able to work on something I'm this passionate about again." After being "wooed" by Feige for months, Coogler agreed to direct the film if he could bring collaborators from his previous films to differentiate the film from other MCU films that are often "shot, composed, and edited by the same in-house people". This included Fruitvale Station (2013) cinematographer Rachel Morrison, as well as production designer Hannah Beachler and composer Ludwig Göransson, who both worked with Coogler on Fruitvale Station and Creed. Coogler felt Black Panther would be unique while still fitting within the MCU's overall narrative.

What's so great about Panther is he's a superhero who ... [is] a leader in his country. It just so happens that the country is a warrior-based nation where the leaders have to be warriors, as well, so sometimes he has to go fight.

— Ryan Coogler, director of Black Panther

In April 2016, Feige said that Coogler was working on the script with Cole, and that filming would begin at the beginning of 2017. He added that the film would be the first Marvel Studios production to feature a "primarily African-American cast": Lupita Nyong'o soon entered negotiations to star as T'Challa's love interest, and Michael B. Jordan joined in an undisclosed role, after previously working with Coogler on Fruitvale Station and Creed. Nate Moore, serving as a producer on the film by the end of May, stated that filming would occur in Atlanta, Georgia, with Marvel "definitely investigating shooting in Africa" as well.

At San Diego Comic-Con 2016, Nyong'o was confirmed for the film, in the role of Nakia, while Jordan's role was revealed to be Erik Killmonger. Also announced was Danai Gurira as Okoye. Coogler confirmed that filming would begin in January 2017. Additional casting occurred from September 2016 until the start of filming, with Winston Duke cast as M'Baku, a role that Yahya Abdul-Mateen II had also tested for as well as Michael James Shaw, who was later cast as Corvus Glaive in Avengers: Infinity War (2018) and Avengers: Endgame (2019), out of interest of visiting Africa before passing on the role; Forest Whitaker as Zuri; Daniel Kaluuya as W'Kabi; Angela Bassett as T'Challa's mother, Ramonda; Sterling K. Brown as N'Jobu; and Letitia Wright in an unspecified role, later to be revealed as Shuri. Dominique Thorne, who would go on to play Riri Williams / Ironheart in the sequel Black Panther: Wakanda Forever (2022), also auditioned to play Shuri. Florence Kasumba was revealed to be reprising her role as Ayo from Captain America: Civil War. Amandla Stenberg, who is biracial and light skinned, was considered for a role in the film but was not comfortable taking the place of a dark-skinned actor, and described her decision to pass on the role as "really challenging". By January 2017, Marvel received permission from the Oakland, California–based public transit agency AC Transit to use their logo in the film for the opening flashback sequence. The setting was chosen due to Coogler growing up in that area.

==== Writing ====
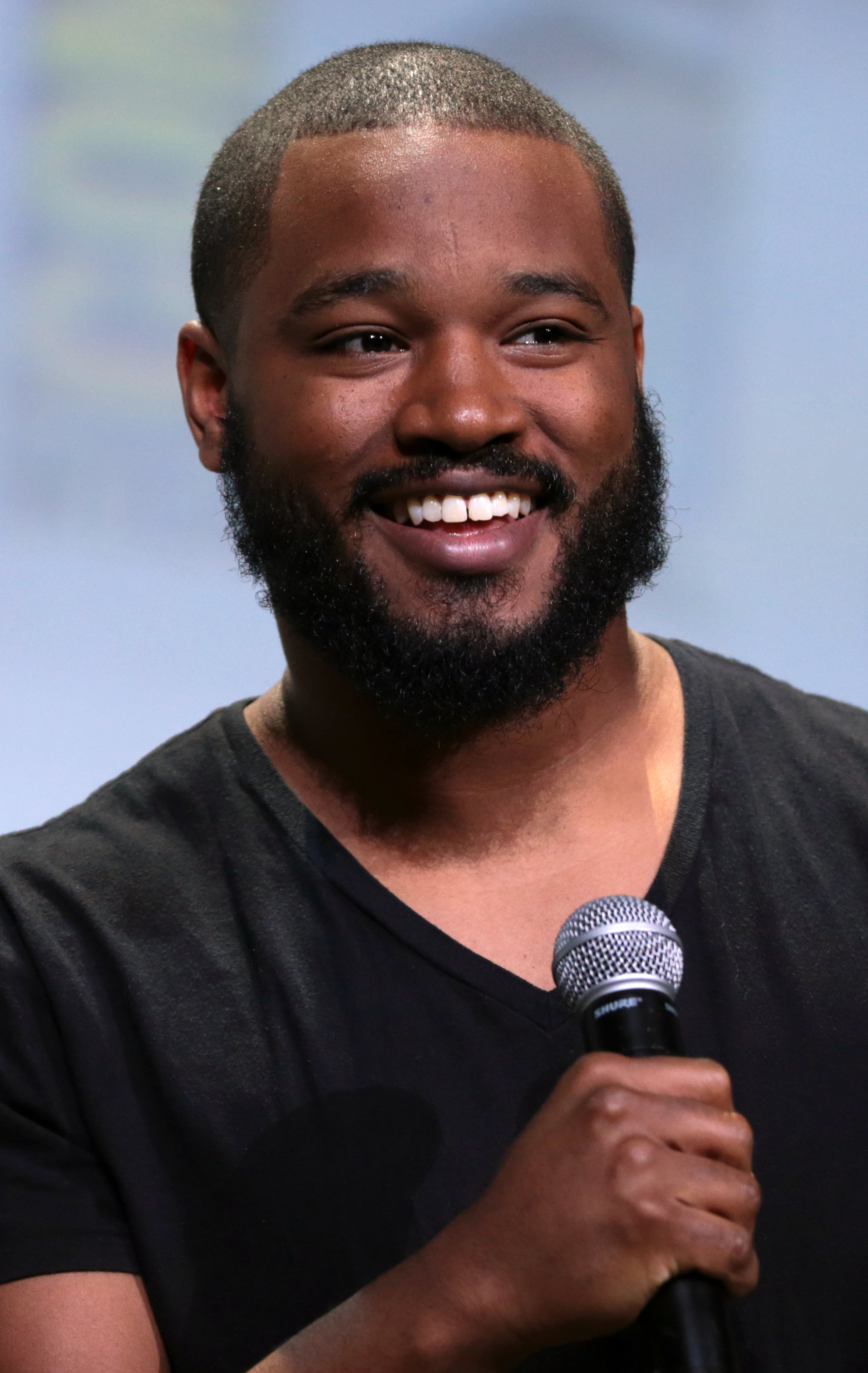
Coogler promoting Black Panther at the 2016 San Diego Comic-Con

The production team was inspired by Ta-Nehisi Coates's run on Black Panther, who was writing the comic at the same time as they were working on the film. Of particular inspiration was Coates's poetic dialogue, Brian Stelfreeze's art, and "some of the questions that it's asking". The film was also inspired by the comic runs of Jack Kirby, Christopher Priest (which Coogler felt most influenced the film), Jonathan Hickman, and Hudlin. Characters for the film were picked from throughout the comics based on what worked for the film's story. The ceremonial betrothal aspect of the Dora Milaje was not adapted from the comics for the film. Coogler had hoped to include Spider-Man villain Kraven the Hunter early in the process because of a scene in Priest's run that had T'Challa fighting Kraven, but the rights to the character were not available due to Sony Pictures owning all rights to Spider-Man characters. Donald Glover and his brother Stephen made some minor contributions to an early draft of the script, developing the relationship between T'Challa and his younger sister Shuri. Moore noted that an early script had more scenes outside of Wakanda to explore "what it means to be African and African-American in the world a bit more", and hoped these could be revisited in a later film, particularly a "super cool" sequence that was storyboarded before being cut. Coogler and Robert Cole had considered including the Golden Age black hero Eli Bradley / Patriot for a while, but they ultimately excluded him to focus on Wakanda. Eli Bradley was eventually featured in the Disney+ miniseries The Falcon and the Winter Soldier (2021), portrayed by Elijah Richardson.

Feige described Black Panther as "a big geopolitical action adventure" that focuses on family and T'Challa learning to be king, with Civil War laying the groundwork for T'Challa's morality and establishing the geopolitical landscape that he would have to deal with on returning to Wakanda. Moore compared the politics and humor of the film to Captain America: The Winter Soldier (2014), saying that the former would be inherent but not "preachy", and that the latter would avoid the tones of Guardians of the Galaxy (2014) and Ant-Man (2015). He also said the film would be a cross between The Godfather (1972) and the James Bond films as a "big, operatic family drama centered around a world of international espionage". Coogler was influenced by 1970s films such as the works of Francis Ford Coppola in that decade, as well as crime fiction. He also watched the film A Prophet (2009) for inspiration. Feige called the film's story "rich in culturally relevant ideas", with Boseman indicating there were parallels to "pull from" in the film in relation to Donald Trump becoming President of the United States after Barack Obama, though Feige added that "these are conversations we were having two years ago because that is inherently the story within the comics." Moore said the film does not depend on the plots of any other MCU films, but it does affect the wider MCU moving forward, with Feige stating the film was "a very important" link to Avengers: Infinity War (2018) and Avengers: Endgame (2019). Civil War did introduce the Wakandan language, based on the Xhosa language, which Boseman was taught by John Kani, who portrays T'Challa's father, King T'Chaka. Additional actors portraying Wakandans in Black Panther learned the language, with Coogler making the use of the language "a priority... as much as possible". Coogler tried to incorporate Xhosa "in natural and authentic situations", such as when multiple Wakandans were speaking in the presence of nonnatives and wanted to say something they would not understand. John Kani's son Atandwa served as a dialect coach on the film along with his father.

==== Design ====
Cole called the film an historic opportunity to depict a Black superhero "at a time when African-Americans are affirming their identities while dealing with vilification and dehumanization". It was important to root the film in the actual cultures of Africa, with the filmmakers consulting with experts on the region of Africa that Wakanda is supposed to be located in, rooting the film "in reality first and then build[ing] out from there". Coogler's vision for Wakanda was inspired by the southern African country Lesotho, a country which has historically been "an enclave, able to protect its independence because of its terrain" and was only lightly colonized by the British; the country's traditional blankets are also featured in the film. Coogler compared the rarity of vibranium existing only in Wakanda to the real-life mineral coltan that can almost only be found in Congo. He wanted Wakanda to feel like a full country with multiple distinct tribes, and created a project bible that detailed each Wakandan tribe to guide the design process. Special care was taken to create a futuristic look that was not alien, as some of Jack Kirby's original comic designs appeared.

===== Sets =====
Beachler wanted to honor the comic designs, but fill in the gaps with research concentrated on Sub-Saharan Africa, pulling inspiration from Uganda, Rwanda, Burundi, Congo-Kinshasa, Ethiopia, as well as the designs of Zaha Hadid, and the pre-colonization architecture of the historic Mali Empire and the city of Timbuktu. Moore described this approach of taking inspiration from many different sources as a love letter to Africa. Beachler looked at the architecture of existing tribes, and then tried to advance the technology naturally rather than if Wakanda had been colonized. Circular motifs, signifying the transmission of energy, were an important theme throughout the film. Older locations depicted in the film, such as Warrior Falls, the City of the Dead, and the Hall of Kings, were juxtaposed with the more modern Afro-punk style of the Golden City, the capital. Rondavels were incorporated into the tops of Wakanda's skyscrapers, inspired by the appearance of mountains at Blyde River Canyon in South Africa.

Beachler created different sigils and architecture for each of the Wakandan tribes, with the Border Tribe inspired by Lesotho, the Merchant Tribe having a sigil based on Nigerian writing, and the Golden Tribe using a sun symbol found throughout Africa. Gorilla City, home to the Jabari Tribe, was originally set in a rain forest, but Coogler suggested that it be found up a mountain in snow. Beachler based the written form of the Wakandan language on an old Nigerian language. She consulted with mining and metallurgy experts for the vibranium technology, including for the vibranium mine where the substance is depicted as glowing blue rocks before it is refined into the stainless steel look previously seen in the MCU. The film also adapts the kimoyo bead technology from the comics, and features sand-based technology. Beachler wanted futuristic elements of the film to be consistent with projections of what real world technology may be like in 25 or 30 years, such as the maglev and hovercraft technology used in vehicles. The Wakandan vehicles include a maglev train for carrying vibranium; the king's Royal Talon Fighter, which looks like a mask from the top and bottom; and the Dragon Flyer, inspired by the Congo peafowl.

The majority of Beachler's sets were constructed on sound stages in Atlanta, including the Tribal Council, Shuri's design space, and the Hall of Kings. The Tribal Council set was built with a glass floor through which an old ruin can be seen. The exterior set for Warrior Falls was built on a backlot north of Atlanta, and was inspired by the Oribi Gorge. The set was 36 feet (11 m), made up of a six-foot-high (1.8 m) pool, and then 30-foot-high (9.1 m) cliff faces that were designed to be extended to 100 feet (30 m) with visual effects. A framework for the cliffs was hand-sculpted from industrial styrofoam, with a system of tunnels built-in to the design to allow extras to climb up to different areas of the cliffs. The framework was then covered with 25,000 cubic feet (710 m^{3}) of foam that was sculptured to match rocks found at Oribi Gorge. The pool was filled using six large pumps, so as to create a waterfall above the ledge at the bottom. The base of the pool was made from padding so stunts could safely be carried out on the set, but designed to look like rocks and to have enough grip that the actors would not fall over in the water. The set was completed in four months, and was used for two weeks of filming.

===== Costumes =====
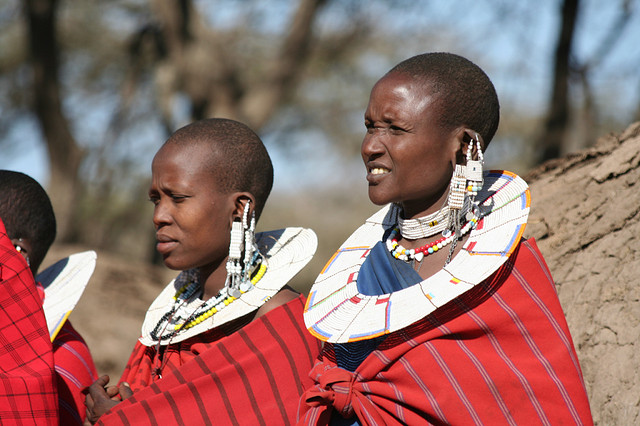
The Maasai people of Kenya (top) inspired about 80% of the design of the Dora Milaje, Wakanda's all-female special forces (bottom).

Costume designer Ruth E. Carter referenced the Maasai, Himba, Dogon, Basotho, Tuareg, Turkana, Xhosa, Zulu, Suri and Dinka people in her designs. She also examined appropriate works by Japanese fashion designer Issey Miyake, French fashion designer Yves Saint Laurent, and American fashion designer Donna Karan. Winnie Mandela provided inspiration to Carter for Angela Bassett's costumes.

The Dora Milaje costumes primarily used red to reflect different African cultures, and included beaded tabards that feature talismans that would be passed down from mother to daughter. Carter wanted to avoid the "girls in the bathing suits" look, and instead have the Dora Milaje wear full armor that they would practically need for battle. She also had to take actors' stunt work into consideration. Anthony Francisco, the Senior Visual Development Illustrator, noted the Dora Milaje costumes were based 80 percent on the Maasai, five percent on samurai, five percent on ninjas, and five percent on the Ifugao people from the Philippines. The arm band and neck rings were a reference to the Southern Ndebele people and denote stature. As such, General Okoye has gold bands and rings while the other Dora Milaje wear silver.

The costumes for T'Challa combined his role as king and as the head of the military, including combining a kente cloth cloak with military boots. Carter also used distinct colors and patterns for each of Wakanda's tribes, such as green with shells for the River Tribe based on the Suri; blue with wood for the Border Tribe; black with royal purple for the Black Panther and the Royal Palace; plums and purples for the Merchant Tribe in reference to the Tuareg; and ochre for the Mining Tribe inspired by the Himba. Three out of every five people in Wakanda go barefoot. The Wakandans wear "normal" clothes outside of the country, with the colors of their costumes kept consistent. Overall, Carter created 700 costumes for the film, working with "an army" of illustrators, designers, mold makers, fabric dyers, jewelry makers and more.

Hair department head Camille Friend referenced traditional African art, fabrics, hair, and textures, and the current-day natural hair movement in her designs. Friend strived to keep the actors' hair natural, using "braids, locs and twists", and when necessary, extensions and wigs. As with Carter, Friend designed each tribe to have their own identifiable aesthetic, such as the Jabari Tribe having hair styled with "very straight, clean lines" and war-paint detail, inspired by Senegalese warriors.

=== Filming ===
Principal photography had begun by January 21, 2017, at EUE/Screen Gems Studios in the Atlanta metropolitan area, under the working title Motherland. Filming also took place at Pinewood Atlanta Studios, and in the Sweet Auburn neighborhood in Atlanta, which doubled as Oakland; the High Museum of Art, which served as the fictional Museum of Great Britain in London; and Atlanta City Hall, which served as a United Nations building. Cinematographer Rachel Morrison, who was eager to work on Black Panther after working with Coogler on Fruitvale Station, first watched all of the other MCU films to understand the established "language". She wanted to "push" that language and feature more contrast in color. Visual effects supervisor Geoff Baumann provided Morrison with before-and-after shots of scenes from Civil War so she could understand what elements are captured on set and what is created digitally. She filmed in 3.4K ArriRaw with Arri Alexa XT Plus cameras and Panavision Primo lenses, primarily using a two-camera set-up with a third or fourth camera on occasion. Morrison said that lighting was her biggest challenge, the magnitude of which "was much bigger than I'd experienced before", and made extensive use of Arri SkyPanel LED light fixtures, which she could preprogram from an iPad. Some sets were completely surrounded by SkyPanels.

Shortly after filming started, Atandwa Kani stated that he would appear in the film alongside his father, the latter reprising the role of T'Chaka, while on-set photographs revealed that Martin Freeman would reprise his role as Everett K. Ross. Marvel announced that production was underway on January 26, and confirmed the casting of Freeman, Wright, and John Kani, while revealing that Andy Serkis would reprise his role as Ulysses Klaue from Avengers: Age of Ultron. Atandwa portrays a younger version of his father's character, and also served as a cultural consultant during filming. Dialect coach Beth McGuire worked to ensure there was continuity between the various actors who had to use "Wakandan accents". Jordan joined the production later than the rest of the core cast. He felt that this aided his performance, since his character is separate from and in conflict with the other characters. Because of this, Jordan kept to himself while he was on set. Since Black Panther and Avengers: Infinity War were filming simultaneously in Atlanta, both production teams worked together closely to ensure a unified presentation of Wakanda in the films, as the country also plays a large role in Infinity War.

Additional filming took place in South Korea, with the city of Busan serving as the setting of a car chase scene that involved 150 cars and over 700 people. Coogler and Morrison referenced the car chase sequences from Bullitt (1968), Drive (2011), and The French Connection (1971), taking the best elements from each for Black Panther's sequence. Filming in Busan began on March 17, at the Jagalchi Fish Market. Filming moved to Gwangalli Beach on March 21, with other South Korean filming locations including Marine City in the Haeundae District and at the Gwangandaegyo Bridge. The production crew hired hundreds of current and former film students from local universities as staff or assistant staff during the South Korea filming. Filming in the country wrapped on March 27, with additional location shooting also taking place at the Rwenzori Mountains and Bwindi Impenetrable National Park in Uganda. John Marzano served as cinematographer for aerial footage of South Africa, Zambia, Uganda, and South Korea. At CinemaCon 2017, Wright was revealed to be portraying Shuri in the film. Filming concluded on April 19, 2017.

=== Post-production ===
==== Editing ====
Black Panther was edited by Michael Shawver and Debbie Berman, with Shawver spending time on set during filming as well as at an editing suite near the Atlanta production base. Berman joined the film after an initial director's cut had been produced, two weeks after she completed work on Marvel's Spider-Man: Homecoming (2017), because Coogler likes to have both a male and female editing his films. She believed that she was chosen by Marvel because she is South African, and had been expressing interest in Black Panther throughout the editing process for Homecoming after first seeing the character in Civil War. Shawver said that a lot of their time editing was spent discussing how their work was affecting the audience. For instance, Shawver felt that initial versions of the first Warrior Falls fight fell "flat" and used techniques he learned working with Coogler on Creed to have the editing move back-and-forth to mimic the back-and-forth of the fighters. He also felt that adding more reaction shots to the crowd during the fight gave more weight to T'Challa's victory at the end. During work on the final battle, Berman pointed out to Coogler that the female Dora Milaje are rescued by the all-male Jabari tribe, which she felt undermined the focus on female characters leading up to that moment. Coogler agreed, and subsequently added female Jabari fighters to the scene through additional photography, including the first onscreen Jabari fighter in the scene. Berman felt that this was an important change that would not have been made if only men were editing the film.

As first hinted by Coogler in January 2018, the film includes two post-credit scenes: one showing T'Challa address the United Nations; and one featuring Sebastian Stan reprising his role as Bucky Barnes. The first scene was originally intended to be part of the actual ending of the film, but was moved to during the credits so the film could conclude in Oakland, where it begins. Coogler felt having this symmetry was important. In the scene, T'Challa says "The foolish build barriers, while the wise build bridges." Some felt this was a reference to the political climate of the presidency of Donald Trump, but Coogler stated that the line was added before Trump's election and was simply an African proverb that his wife had found. His intention with the scene was to inspire the audience by making T'Challa seem like a real person in a familiar, real-world environment, similar to how Tony Stark was treated in Iron Man (2008). Coogler was not mandated by Marvel to feature connections to other films, but was interested in addressing the fact that Barnes was in Wakanda (per the end of Civil War) because it would be fun for the audience. He did not feel the character fit in the body of the film, but felt that an end-credits scene was appropriate. Coogler originally pitched a post-credits scene teasing Namor, which would have depicted wet footprints leading to the throne in the Wakandan palace; this did not occur in part because of rights issues with the character. Namor debuts instead in Black Panther: Wakanda Forever, portrayed by Tenoch Huerta Mejía.

==== Visual effects ====
Visual effects for the film were created by: Industrial Light & Magic (ILM) with help from Virtuos, Stereo D, and Scanline VFX; Double Negative; Luma Pictures; Mammal Studios; Method Studios; Perception; Rise Visual Effects Studios; Torm Studios; Trixter; Cantina Creative; Lola VFX; Capital T; Exceptional Minds; Technicolor VFX; Rodeo FX; Imageloom VFX; Anibrain; Method Pune; Bot VFX; Pixstone Images; Futureworks; Vertigo Visual; FX3X; and Yannix Thailand Co. Previsualization was completed by Digital Domain and The Third Floor. Geoffrey Baumann served as visual effects supervisor.

Previsualization (top) and completed visual effects shot of Wakanda by Industrial Light & Magic (bottom)

Comparing Black Panther to other MCU films, Baumann noted that the visual effects department often have free rein when creating otherworldly science fiction designs, but had to be more specific with this film due to the need to be authentic to African culture and geography. For the Warrior Falls environment, the amphitheater-like cliff walls had to be populated with digital spectators that could not simply be copy-and-pasted around the set due to the precise costume designs created by Carter for each tribe and character. Instead, the visual effects department had to work with the costumers to individually model each digital extra for the sequence. Additionally, visual effects were also used to adjust the opening sequence after test audiences were confusing the characters of T'Chaka and T'Challa, both dressed as the Black Panther. Artists digitally added some grey to T'Chaka's beard and gold trimmings to his suit to help differentiate the characters.

ILM was primarily responsible for creating the digital urban environments of Wakanda. ILM VFX supervisor Craig Hammack compared this work to his time on Tomorrowland (2015), but noted the additional challenge of not just building a futuristic city, but also one that was culturally appropriate. He explained that African culture has a "certain amount of earthy material qualities that make things difficult to design as a futuristic city," which would typically use much steel and glass. ILM looked to real life examples that blend modern architecture with natural environments like One Central Park in Sydney and The Pearl of Africa Hotel in Kampala, but also had to "depart from a strict understanding of physics and go into a movie cheat world" at times to produce the desired look. Hammack was also inspired by the architecture of Uganda, where he spent time while aerial footage for the film was being shot. 60,000 individual buildings were designed and modeled for the city, which Hammack said was the first thing ILM began work on and also the last thing they were doing when the film was completed. Other things that ILM worked on during the production included set extensions and blue-screen replacements for interior sets, and the first rhinoceros shown in the film. For T'Challa's ancestral plane scenes, ILM replaced the basic set that was used with a full CG environment including an acacia tree and animated panthers. The sky was based on the Northern Lights, with this first designed for nighttime scenes before being replicated for daytime scenes in which the animators had to work hard to keep the effects visible. ILM also added additional sand for the burial sequences so Boseman could breathe during filming, and additional flames when Killmonger burns the heart-shaped herb.

Method Studios created many of the natural environments of Wakanda. The company built a 3,600 km^{2} (1,400 sq mi) landscape that is visible in various aerial shots in the film, which was based on multiple landscapes from across Africa. Method was also responsible for creating Black Panther's and Killmonger's digital suits, including developing the look of the nanotechnology they use. They created many of the film's digital characters, vehicles, and weapons, with some of those digital creatures being rhinoceroses for the final battle, a sequence that Method did the majority of the work for. Because these rhinoceroses did not have to be seen on screen with the one designed by ILM, only basic structures, scale, and details of the character models had to be shared between the two companies. Much of the work for the final fight included crowd simulation, with Method working alongside the stunt coordinators in motion capture sessions to give each fighter a unique style. In addition to randomizing the height and weight of each digital fighter, the models had to incorporate specific design elements from the costumers. Method also worked on the vibranium mine and Shuri's laboratory, including animating the gadgets seen in the latter.

External videos
- Marvel Studios' Black Panther End Credits Main on End Title Sequence - Visuals Only presents the film's main-on-end title sequence, YouTube video from Perception's channel

Luma Pictures worked on the Busan car chase sequence, digitally creating the cars featured in the sequence based on CAD models and on-set reference. Multiple digital versions of the same car were created, so the production could have the actual cars crash and do various stunts with them, with Luma then inserting the digital versions to augment these moments. Luma also created the sonic forces from Klaue's cannon, while Scanline VFX worked on digitally removing Serkis's left arm for the London museum heist sequence. Several companies worked on the vibranium sand effects used in Wakandan technology, including ILM for the beginning of the film. Perception spent 18 months researching real-world technologies, phenomena, and visual themes to aid them in their work on the film. Their designs for the vibranium sand were based on research being done with ultrasonic transducers for the purpose of mid-air haptics and acoustic levitation. They integrated this research into the kimoyo beads worn by Wakandans and as a working interface on the royal talon fighter. Perception also created the traditional displays on the talon fighter and in Shuri's lab. For the talon fighter, the company "experimented with parallax, depth, and volume in the information being displayed, as well as developing a unique color palette to brand the Wakandan tech". In Shuri's lab, Perception adjusted the hues on the wall to match her attire, and for her healing room "proposed that the hexagonal pattern seen on the wall actually reveal itself to be articulating panels" that "pulse and ripple". The company also created the function of Black Panther's suit with nano technology and "layering the suit with different patterns as well as adding 'sub-dermal' luminescent tattoos", the virtual car chase with Shuri and T'Challa, and designed the opening prologue, with the final version created by Storm VFX. Perception also created the main-on-end title sequence.

== Music ==
After reading the script, composer Ludwig Göransson decided to go to Africa to do research for the film. He spent a month in Senegal, first traveling around with musician Baaba Maal on his tour, and then spending several weeks working with local musicians to form the "base" of his score. Göransson was particularly drawn to the talking drum and the tambin, or Fula flute, to use in his character themes, along with horns. Nate Moore compared the work Göransson did in defining the sound of the film to the use of music by James Gunn in the Guardians of the Galaxy films, with the composer pushing Marvel out of their comfort zone.

Kendrick Lamar produced the film's curated soundtrack, Black Panther: The Album, along with Top Dawg Entertainment founder Anthony Tiffith, after Coogler wanted to include original songs from Lamar in the film because his "artistic themes align with those we explore in the film". The soundtrack features songs that are heard in the film as well as others that are inspired by it, with the other artists featured the majority of "top-billing names" under Top Dawg Entertainment. Göransson collaborated with Lamar and producer Sounwave on the soundtrack. Three singles from the album were released throughout January and February 2018: "All the Stars", "King's Dead", and "Pray for Me". Black Panther: The Album was released on February 9, 2018, while a soundtrack of Göransson's score was released on February 16. An extended play titled Black Panther: Wakanda Remixed, featuring remixes of five cues from Göransson's score, was released on August 16, 2018. Göransson worked with several other artists to create the remixes.

== Marketing ==
Marvel debuted early footage and concept art from the film at a press event in April 2017. Kyle Buchanan of Vulture praised the cinematography, costume and production design, and Black cast, saying "Black Panther doesn't look like any of the other Marvel movies ... If this is what the future of superhero movies looks like, deal me in." The screened footage was the first time Marvel had shown raw dailies, which Feige said they did to show off the "highest-class cast we've had" despite editing having not yet begun. A poster was released ahead of the first teaser trailer, which premiered during Game 4 of the 2017 NBA Finals. Fans on Twitter felt the poster was poorly photoshopped, and it was compared to a real-life picture of Black Panther Party co-founder Huey P. Newton. The trailer received a much more positive response, with Peter Sciretta of /Film finding it unexpected and refreshing, io9's Charles Pulliam-Moore calling it "every bit as intense as you were hoping it would be", and Andrew Husband for Uproxx feeling the single teaser outshone the entire Homecoming marketing campaign. It was viewed 89 million times in 24 hours, generating 349,000 mentions (second only to the amount the Star Wars: The Last Jedi (2017) teaser received) and "dominated the conversation on social media" over Game 4. Per comScore and its PreAct service, the film was the subject of the most new social media conversations for the rest of the week, and the second-most for the week ending June 18, behind Homecoming.

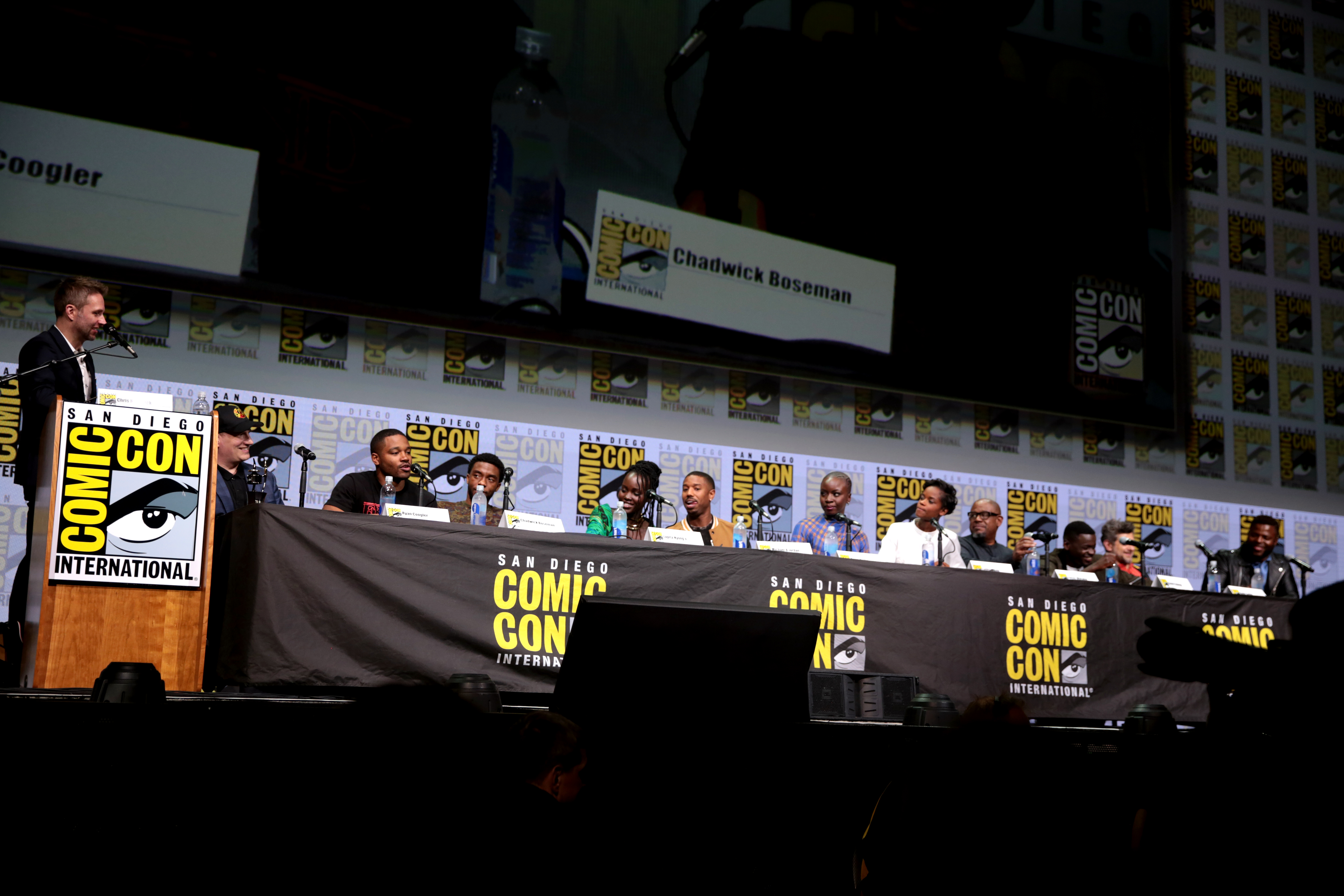
(L:R) Moderator Chris Hardwick, Feige, Coogler, and the cast of Black Panther at the 2017 San Diego Comic-Con

Costumes from the film were on display at D23 Expo 2017 and the 2017 San Diego Comic-Con, with Coogler, Boseman, and other members of the cast presenting exclusive footage of the film at the latter event, to a standing ovation from the audience. In September, Coogler, Gurira, and Moore participated in a panel at the Congressional Black Caucus Foundation's Annual Legislative Conference, where exclusive footage from the film was also shown and met with a positive response. On October 16, 2017, a full trailer was released. Dave Trumbore for Collider praised the trailer for showing an "unmistakable sense of style" unique to the character, while BamSmackPow's Brendan Day felt the trailer "does everything right". Writing for Rolling Stone, Tre Johnson felt the trailer showed T'Challa as "someone with the arrogance of [John] Shaft, the coolness of [Barack] Obama and the hot-headed impulsiveness of Kanye West". A few days later, Marvel Comics published a prelude tie-in comic focusing on one of T'Challa's first missions as the Black Panther set around the time of Iron Man. The first College Football Playoff National Championship halftime show was organized by Disney for the 2018 championship game, with Kendrick Lamar performing to promote Black Panther: The Album and the beginning of ticket sales for the film.

By February 12, Black Panther was the most-tweeted about film of 2018 with more than 5 million tweets globally, and in mid-March it became the most-tweeted-about film ever with 35 million. During New York Fashion Week, designers Cushnie et Ochs, Ikiré Jones, Tome, Sophie Theallet, Fear of God, Chromat, and LaQuan Smith created custom pieces that were inspired by the film for an event titled "Welcome to Wakanda: Fashion for the Black Panther Era". Marvel Studios formed a partnership with Lexus on the film, with the 2018 Lexus LC being featured in it. The partnership produced a graphic novel, Black Panther: Soul of a Machine, which was released in December 2017 from writers Fabian Nicieza, Geoffrey Thorne, and Chuck Brown; a concept coupe from Lexus inspired by the character; and a Super Bowl LII commercial featuring Boseman, Gurira and Wright, which had 4.3 million views on social media after its Super Bowl airing, according to RelishMix. Other marketing partners included shoe manufacturer Clarks creating a film-inspired variant of their Originals' Trigenic Evo shoe; PepsiCo and Unilever launching an arts program for young people in urban areas to be mentored by established artists; Brisk created an interactive Black Panther installation at the 2018 NBA All-Star Game; Lancôme highlighted a line of makeup that Nyong'o and Wright used at the film's premiere; and Synchrony Financial with Marvel awarded the Ghetto Film School Fellows program with a $50,000 grant, with Coogler speaking to the school's students.

Overall, Black Panther had the most expansive advertising budget and biggest line of merchandise of any Marvel non-sequel. Deadline Hollywood estimated that budget to be $150 million. Asad Ayaz, Executive Vice President of Marketing for Marvel films, said the campaign was about "super-serving" Black audiences while still trying to appeal to all, in order to make the film "feel like a cultural event". Disney and Marvel created a "synergy program" with the College Football Playoffs on ESPN, the ABC television series Black-ish, Grey's Anatomy, Scandal, and How to Get Away With Murder, the Freeform series Grown-ish, and the Bravo franchise The Real Housewives. Marketing outside the United States was "fairly uniform", though in the Middle East the focus was kept on Black Panther in-costume as superhero films "just keep working" there according to Gianluca Chakra of Middle East distributor Front Row. This was the same for Asian territories. A Wakanda exhibit was featured in malls in seven Chinese cities, along with displays showing Black Panther with other MCU characters. A special trailer created for China had Boseman explain the character's connection to other MCU films. Weibo attended the Los Angeles premiere to take pictures and videos with the cast and crew in real time for China, the first time the company has partnered with a foreign studio for this type of engagement.

== Release ==
=== Theatrical ===
Black Panther had its world premiere at the Dolby Theatre in Los Angeles on January 29, 2018. The premiere featured a purple carpet that was flanked by women dressed as the Dora Milaje, while Coogler, cast members, and other guests wore African clothing at the request of Marvel for attendees to wear "royal attire", honoring the African setting of the film. Ahead of the premiere screening, Coogler received an extended standing ovation before he announced the cast of the film. Black Panther was released in the United Kingdom, Hong Kong, and Taiwan on February 13, in South Korea on February 14, and the United States on February 16. In the United States, the film opened in 4,020 theaters, with over 3,200 of those in 3D, 404 in IMAX, over 660 in premium large format, and over 200 D-Box locations. In addition, Black Panther was the first MCU film to be converted to ScreenX, a 270-degree wraparound format, that played in over 101 locations in eight countries. The film opened in most markets in its first weekend of release including a "cross-nation release" in Africa, a first for a Disney film. Black Panther was originally scheduled for release on November 3, 2017, before moving to July 6, 2018, to accommodate Spider-Man: Homecoming (2017). It was then moved to the final February date to accommodate Ant-Man and the Wasp (2018). Black Panther is part of Phase Three of the MCU.

When Black Panther premiered in Riyadh, Saudi Arabia on April 18, 2018, it was the first public film viewing after a nearly-30-year-old ban on cinemas was rescinded in December 2017. The premiere took place in a cinema owned by AMC Theatres in the King Abdullah Financial District of Riyadh. Disney's regional distributor, Italia Film, said 40 seconds of the film had been removed, which was in line with cuts made to the film across the region. Awwad Alawwad, Saudi Arabia's Minister of Culture and Information, and Adam Aron, CEO of AMC Entertainment, were in attendance for the premiere along with other diplomats and industry experts; no one from the cast or production team was in attendance. Black Panther screened there for five days before Avengers: Infinity War premiered on April 26.

Black Panther returned to 250 AMC Theatres in the United States from February 1 until February 7, 2019, for free, with two showings of the film occurring at each theater for the week. The week-long return was in honor of the start of Black History Month and the film winning two Screen Actors Guild Awards and earning an Academy Award Best Picture nomination. Disney also gave a $1.5 million grant to the United Negro College Fund.

=== Home media ===
Black Panther was released for digital download by Walt Disney Studios Home Entertainment on May 8, 2018, and on Ultra HD Blu-ray, Blu-ray, and DVD on May 15, 2018. The digital and Blu-ray releases included several bonus features: behind-the-scenes featurettes, audio commentary, deleted scenes, a blooper reel, an exclusive look at Ant-Man and the Wasp, and a featurette on the first ten years of the MCU. As of November 11, 2018, the film's Blu-ray and DVD releases have sold 4.2 million units and grossed $87 million in the United States, making it the best-selling film of 2018. Black Panther was originally made available on Netflix, but was removed in March 2020 after Disney regained license for the film. It was released on Disney+ on March 4, 2020, in the United States and Canada.

On June 19, 2020, TBS, TNT, and truTV aired the film, along with Just Mercy (2019), another film which also starred Jordan, to coincide with the celebrations of Juneteenth and to support social justice against systemic racism in response to the murder of George Floyd. On August 30, 2020, ABC hosted a television special Chadwick Boseman: A Tribute for a King, aired after the film's commercial-free premiere on the same day, to honor Boseman, who died on August 28, 2020, from colon cancer. The special was presented by Robin Roberts, and featured about Boseman's life, career and legacy, as well as tributes served by celebrities, political figures and fans; it also featured other Marvel co-stars, Robert Downey Jr., Scarlett Johansson, Jeremy Renner, Mark Ruffalo, and Paul Rudd, along with Marvel Studios chief Kevin Feige, and Disney CEO Bob Iger, sharing their experiences on working with Boseman, and the legacy he had left behind. The special released on Disney+ after its television debut.

External videos
- Modified Marvel Studios opening to honor Boseman, Marvel Studios tweet

On November 29, 2020, Marvel changed the studio's production logo animation in the opening of the film to include images of Boseman from the film, as well as his appearances in Captain America: Civil War, Avengers: Infinity War, and Avengers: Endgame. Black Panther concept art and excerpts from the script were also included. This change was done on the Disney+ version of the film, to honor Boseman on what would have been his 44th birthday. Despite being released in IMAX theaters in the 1.90:1 aspect ratio, the home media release only includes the cropped 2.39:1 aspect ratio version that was used for non-IMAX screenings. The IMAX Enhanced version of the film was made available on Disney+ beginning on November 12, 2021.

== Reception ==
=== Box office ===
Black Panther grossed $700.4 million in the United States and Canada, and $649.5 million in other territories, for a worldwide total of $1.350 billion. It became the highest-grossing solo superhero film, the third-highest-grossing film of the MCU and superhero film overall, the ninth-highest-grossing film of all time, and the highest-grossing film by an African-American director. It is the fifth MCU film and the 33rd film overall to surpass $1 billion at the box office, and it is the second-highest-grossing film of 2018. Deadline Hollywood calculated the film's net profit as $476.8 million, accounting for production budgets, marketing, talent participations, and other costs; box office grosses and home media revenues placed it second on their list of 2018's "Most Valuable Blockbusters".

==== Pre-sale tickets ====
The film had the fourth-highest pre-sale tickets sold on Fandango, and became the top pre-seller for a superhero film and for a film released in February as well as the first quarter of a year. The first 24 hours of ticket pre-sales on the site were the largest for a Marvel film. Black Panther also had the highest number of ticket pre-sales for any superhero film at Alamo Drafthouse Cinema, while out-selling all previous Marvel films at AMC Theatres, and having strong pre-sales at Atom Tickets. Four days before its United States opening, IMAX Entertainment CEO Greg Foster revealed that Black Panther had the most advanced IMAX ticket sales of any Marvel film, which did not appear to have peaked 10 days before opening as with most films; Black Panther, he said, "feels like it's going to peak the day it opens". Fandango's pre-sales ultimately accounted for 30% of the film's United States and Canada opening weekend gross, one of the largest box office shares for any film in Fandango's history.

==== United States and Canada ====
Early projections for Black Panther's opening weekend ranged from $80–170 million, with rival film studios projecting the total to be as high as $180–200 million; Disney projected the gross to be around $150 million. It ultimately earned $75.8 million on its opening day (including $25.2 million from Thursday night previews), and $242.1 million over the four-day Presidents' Day weekend. This was the best Presidents' Day weekend opening, and the best opening weekend for a Black director and predominantly Black cast. With a total gross of $202 million, the film had the highest February opening weekend, surpassing Deadpool (2016). For AMC Theatres, Black Panther became the highest-grossing film ever at 33 locations, and had the biggest opening weekend for 150 of them. Overall, this was the second-largest opening weekend ever for the chain with 4.4 million admissions. Atom Tickets sold more tickets for Black Panther than any other superhero film. Anthony D'Alessandro of Deadline Hollywood described the success as "summer box office records during the second month of the year".

The week after its opening weekend was also strong, with a record-setting Tuesday and Thursday earnings, becoming the MCU film with the highest first-week gross. It also surpassed $300 million in eight days, becoming the fastest MCU film to do so. In its second weekend, the film earned $112 million, which was a 45 percent decrease from its opening week, the smallest decline in a second weekend for any MCU film. It was the second-best second weekend ever, and the best second weekend for a Marvel film beating The Avengers ($103 million). Black Panther also became the highest-grossing film released in February, surpassing The Passion of the Christ (2004) ($370.3 million).

Black Panther was the first film to hold the number one spot at the box office for at least five weekends since Avatar (2009), and the first February release to hold the top box office spot for five weekends since Wayne's World in 1992. The film declined over subsequent weekends, but remained in the top ten through its tenth. In its eleventh weekend, the film rose back up at the box office, in part because of the release of Avengers: Infinity War the same weekend, and the following weekend it earned $3.14 million from over 1,600 locations. D'Alessandro noted the gross from that number of locations indicated people were continuing to see Black Panther in conjunction with Infinity War. Black Panther was in the top ten again in its thirteenth weekend.

In its 25th weekend, Disney increased the film's theater count from 10 to 25 to help the film become the third ever to surpass $700 million. Brian Gallagher of IGN felt the film surpassing $700 million was more impressive than Infinity War's $2.045 billion worldwide gross at the time. Gallagher pointed to Black Panther being more consistent each week, never having more than a 50% weekend decrease until the 15th frame while Infinity War dropped 55% in its second weekend, its February release date without any major competition from other films, and the fact it was "a rallying cry for diversity and representation". Black Panther is the highest-grossing film of 2018 and became the third-highest-grossing film of all time, as well as the highest-grossing superhero film. Its IMAX total of $36 million is the most for any MCU film. In July 2020, due to the worldwide closure of cinemas during the COVID-19 pandemic and limits on which films played, Black Panther returned to 421 theaters—mostly drive-ins—and grossed $367,000, the second-highest for the weekend behind The Empire Strikes Back's (1980) re-release.

==== Other territories ====
Outside the United States and Canada, the film opened in 48 territories in its first weekend and earned $184 million, opening at number one in most territories (though second in some, where Fifty Shades Freed performed better, such as Germany and Italy). It became the top February opening in many countries, including in the African market and the Middle East, while taking the top spot across Latin America. IMAX accounted for $11.5 million of the opening weekend gross, from 272 screens, which included record opening weekends in the format for Nigeria, Kenya, and Indonesia. In its second weekend, in 55 territories, the film earned $83.5 million and remained number one in most, including across Latin America, while becoming the top film in Germany. The West Africa region saw a 7% increase, which resulted in the biggest three-day weekend ever there. Trinidad had the biggest opening weekend ever ($700,000) and the IMAX release in Russia ($1.7 million) was a February record for that country.

In its third weekend, the film remained number one across many of its 56 territories, including the entire Latin America region, while its opening in Japan was the top Western film for the weekend, the second overall. In its fourth weekend, Black Panther opened in China ($66.5 million) with the fourth-highest MCU and superhero opening ever in the country. This included the biggest opening day and opening weekend ($7.3 million) of March for IMAX in China. The film also remained at number one in the United Kingdom and the Latin America region (except Argentina) for the fourth straight weekend, as well as number one in South Africa, Australia and New Zealand. Black Panther was the top film in South Africa for seven weeks, where it became the highest-grossing film ever. It also became the highest-grossing film of all time in West and East Africa, and the southern Africa region, and the highest-grossing superhero film ever in the Netherlands. As of April 8, 2018, the film's largest markets were China ($104.6 million), the United Kingdom ($67.7 million), and South Korea ($42.8 million). It became the fifth-highest-grossing MCU film of all time in other territories.

=== Critical response ===
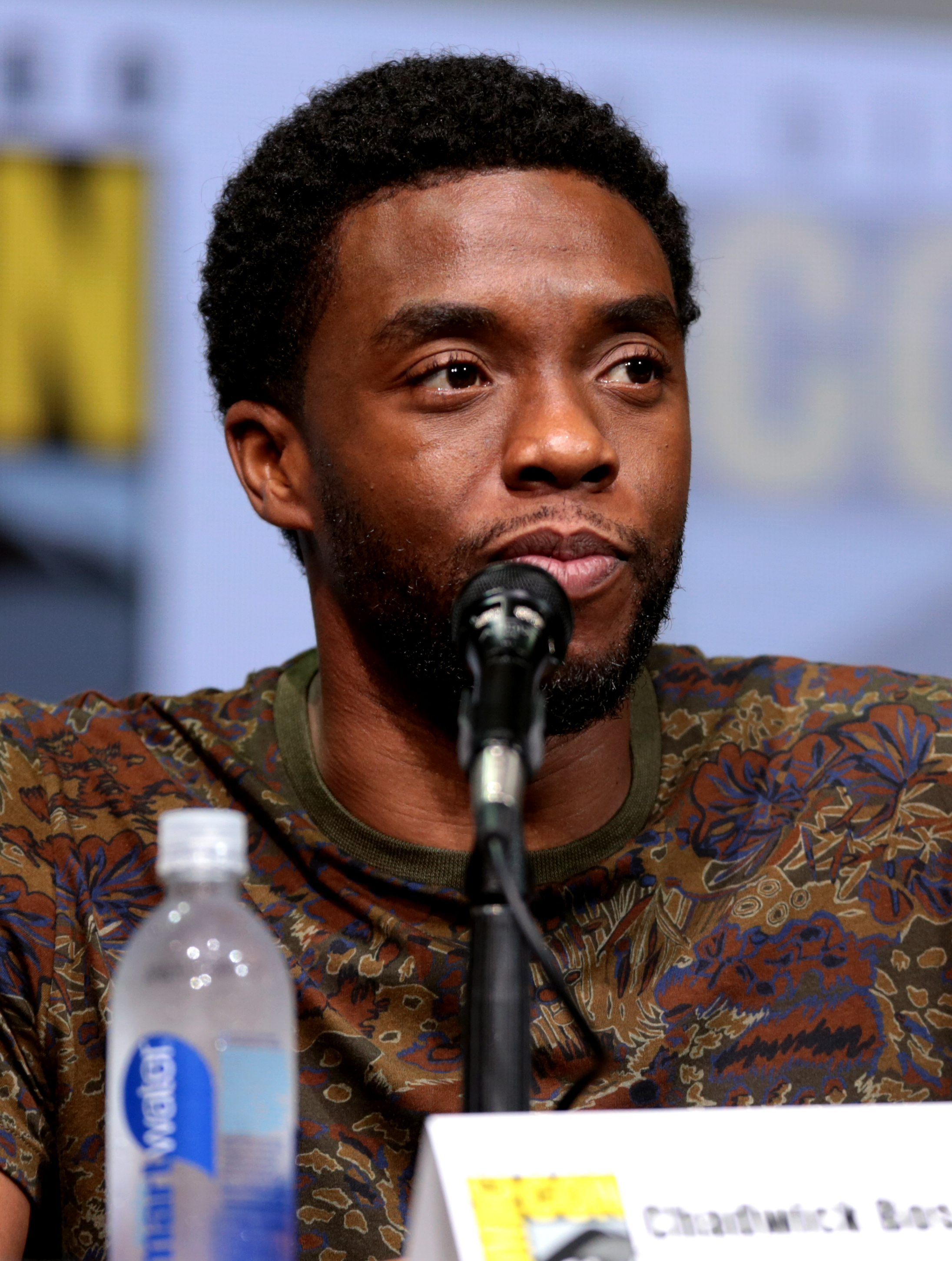
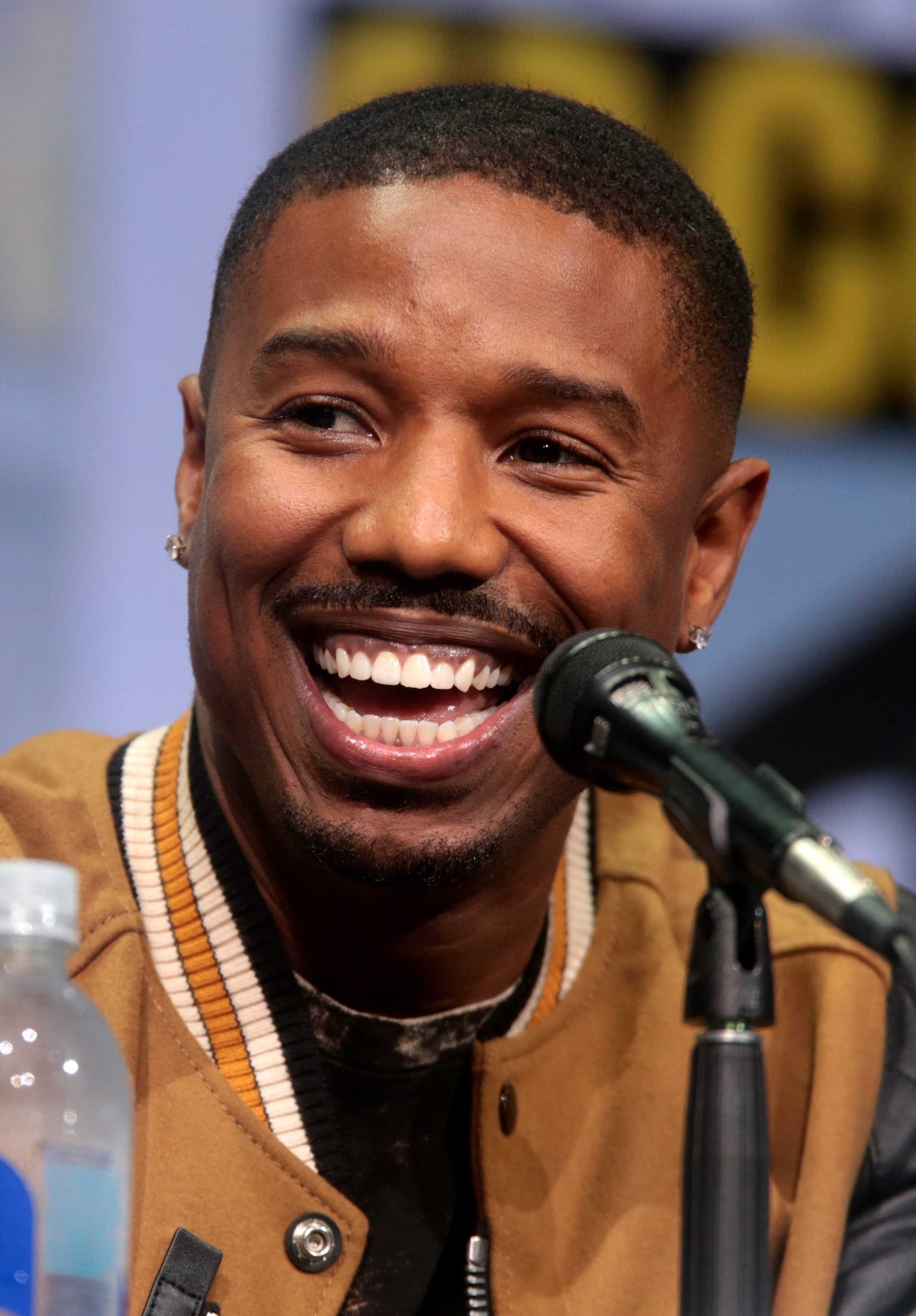
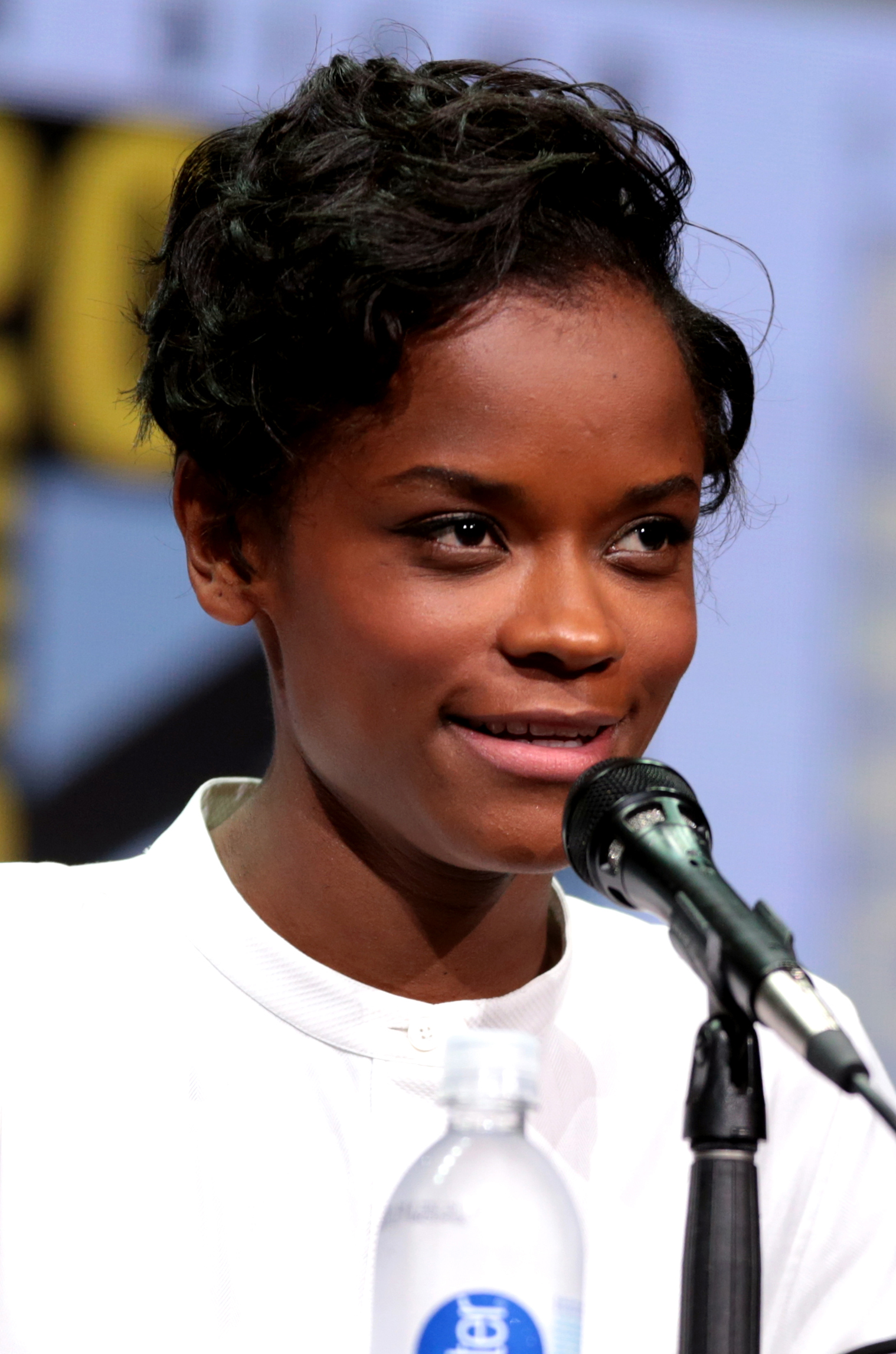
The performances of Chadwick Boseman, Michael B. Jordan, and Letitia Wright (L to R) received widespread critical acclaim.

The review aggregator Rotten Tomatoes reported an approval rating of 96%, with an average score of 8.3/10, based on 526 reviews. The website's critical consensus reads, "Black Panther elevates superhero cinema to thrilling new heights while telling one of the MCU's most absorbing stories—and introducing some of its most fully realized characters." As of February 18, 2018, it was the best-reviewed live-action superhero film on the site, beating The Dark Knight (2008) and Iron Man (both 94%). Metacritic, which uses a weighted average, assigned the film a score of 88 out of 100 based on 55 critics, indicating "universal acclaim". Audiences polled by CinemaScore gave the film an average grade of "A+" on an A+ to F scale, the second live-action superhero film to receive that grade after Marvel's The Avengers. Filmgoers polled by comScore's PostTrak service gave the film a 95% positive score and an 88% "definite recommend", with a third of people planning to see the film again. RelishMix reported that the use of Twitter hashtags for #BlackPanther and tagging of the film's Twitter account from those leaving the theater was the highest for a film's opening weekend, with 559,000 unique posts in one day (100,000 posts for a film is average). Black Panther was listed on many critics' top ten lists as a top film of 2018.

Individual critics called Black Panther one of the best standalone Marvel films, one of the best Marvel origin films, one of the best superhero films of the century, and a "refreshing answer to the increasingly stale world of superhero cinema". Peter Travers of Rolling Stone called it unlike any other Marvel film, "an exhilarating triumph on every level from writing, directing, acting, production design, costumes, music, special effects to you name it". Jamelle Bouie put the film in the same league as Superman (1978), Spider-Man 2 (2004), and The Dark Knight, superhero films that do not "transcend the genre as much as they embrace it in all its respects". Bouie concluded, "Black Panther could have been just another Marvel romp [but] Coogler and company had the power, and perhaps the responsibility, to do much more. And they did." The cast was acclaimed. Todd McCarthy of The Hollywood Reporter said Boseman "certainly holds his own, but there are quite a few charismatic supporting players" including Jordan, Nyong'o, and Wright.

The writing was praised for its handling of themes of Africans. Manohla Dargis honored Black Panther as an "emblem of a past that was denied and a future that feels very present" due to its focus on Black imagination, creation, and liberation. At the Los Angeles Times, Kenneth Turan praised the themes of the film and their exploration of what wealthy countries owe to the poor and oppressed, and noted that the film "draws energy from Coogler's sense of excitement at all he's attempting", saying that the film was worth seeing twice which he felt was rare for a modern superhero film. Richard Roeper, writing for the Chicago Sun-Times, said audiences should watch the film if they appreciate "finely honed storytelling with a Shakespearean core; winning performances from an enormously talented ensemble; provocative premises touching on isolationism, revolution and cultures of oppression, and oh yeah, tons of whiz-bang action sequences and good humor". Brian Truitt of USA Today stated, "While the themes are deep, Black Panther is at the same time a visual joy to behold, with confident quirkiness, insane action sequences and special effects, and the glorious reveal of Wakanda".

Natasha Alford of The Grio called the film a "movement, a revolution in progress, and a joy to experience all wrapped into one", and called it "a master class in what it means to be proud of who you are". Jamie Broadnax of Black Girl Nerds called the film a masterpiece that is "afro-futuristic and Blackity-black as hell. It's everything I've ever desired in a live-action version of this popular superhero and yet so much more." Bouie said, "it is fair to say that Black Panther is the most political movie ever produced by Marvel Studios, both in its very existence... and in the questions its story raises." Devindra Hardawar at Engadget was critical of the CGI, notably the digital actors used, calling them "weightless, ugly and, worst of all, incredibly distracting". Hardawar felt two "particularly disappointing" CGI shots were when T'Challa flips over a car during the Korea chase, and when T'Challa and Killmonger punch each other as they fall within the vibranium mines.

=== Analysis ===
==== Cultural importance ====
Many have wondered why Black Panther means so much to the Black community and why schools, churches and organizations have come to the theaters with so much excitement. The answer is that the movie brings a moment of positivity to a group of people often not the centerpiece of Hollywood movies... [Racial and ethnic socialization] helps to strengthen identity and helps reduce the likelihood on internalizing negative stereotypes about one's ethnic group.

— Erlanger Turner, assistant professor of Psychology at the University of Houston–Downtown

Writing for Time, Jamil Smith felt Black Panther would "prove to Hollywood that African-American narratives have the power to generate profits from all audiences", and described it as a resistance to "a regressive cultural and political moment fueled in part by the white-nativist movement... Its themes challenge institutional bias, its characters take unsubtle digs at oppressors, and its narrative includes prismatic perspectives on Black life and tradition." Discussing the film as a defining moment for Black America in The New York Times Magazine, Carvell Wallace said that in contrast to earlier Black superhero films, Black Panther "is steeped very specifically and purposefully in its Blackness". He felt Wakanda would become a "promised land" for future generations of Black Americans, "untroubled by the criminal horrors of our [current] American existence." Historian Nathan D. B. Connolly said Black Panther was "a powerful fictional analogy for real-life struggles" that taps into a "500-year history of African-descended people imagining freedom, land and national autonomy." Connolly also felt, culturally, the film would be this generation's A Raisin in the Sun (1961). Writer and activist Shaun King found the film to be a cultural moment in American Black history similar to Rosa Parks' Montgomery bus boycott, Martin Luther King Jr.'s "I Have a Dream" speech, or Barack Obama being elected president.

By contrast, James Wilt, writing for Canadian Dimension, stated that "at its core, Black Panther contains a fundamentally reactionary understanding of Black liberation that blatantly advocates respectability politics over revolution" allowing "white folks such as myself to feel extremely comfortable watching it". Wilt found the scene where Ross is portrayed as "the hero" for shooting down the Wakandan ships to be the film's way of approving the vanquishing of armed resistance against oppression. Wilt also felt that Killmonger was given the "most hideous traits imaginable [making] the only major African-American character and agitator for revolution a manic killer consumed by rage and violence". Russell Rickford of Africa is a Country wrote that Killmonger's role as a character is "to discredit radical internationalism". Faisal Kutty from Middle East Eye felt the film had underlying Islamophobic themes, with the only Islamic characters being a Boko Haram–based group that kidnapped several girls and forced them to wear hijab.

Science & Entertainment Exchange Director for the National Academy of Sciences Richard Loverd felt the film would increase interest in science, technology, and Africa for young Black Americans, similarly to how The Hunger Games films and Brave (2012) sparked girls' interest in archery. Broadnax felt many people who generally do not watch comic book films would go to Black Panther since "they're going to see themselves reflected in a huge way that they just haven't been able to see before", especially since the film avoided the plight typically depicted in films about the Black experience. She also stated that the strong female characters, such as Shuri, would be an inspiration for girls.

Gil Robertson, co-founder and president of the African American Film Critics Association, called the film "critically important" and "a gate-opener opportunity for other Black-centered projects". In 2022, producer and actress Viola Davis credited the film for helping her film The Woman King (2022) get made. Child development expert Deborah Gilboa felt the film would "make a huge impact on children's spirits" by offering positive role models. Scholar Marlene D. Allen felt the saying "if you can see it, you can be it" applied to the film, especially with the female characters in the film. Allen felt the women of Wakanda "are the very definition of 'Black Girl Magic', a term coined by CaShawn Thompson in 2013 'to celebrate the beauty, power, and resilience of Black women.'" Tre Johnson of Rolling Stone felt that "after decades of trying to nail the modern Black superhero, we may finally be getting what we've asked for", with Johnson saying Black Panther felt different from the Blaxploitation films of the 1970s and the "Blaxploitation-lite" attempts at Black superhero films in the 1990s and 2000s because it was "respectable, imaginative and powerful", setting "a new direction" for the depiction of Black superheroes. In the film's opening weekend, 37% of audiences in the United States were African-American, according to PostTrak, compared to 35% Caucasian, 18% Hispanic, and 5% Asian. This was the most diverse audience for a superhero film ever (African-Americans generally make up 15% of audiences for superhero films). In its second weekend, demographics were 37% Caucasian, 33% African American, 18% Hispanic and 7% Asian.

In early January 2018, philanthropist Frederick Joseph created a GoFundMe drive to raise money for children of color at the Boys & Girls Club in Harlem to see Black Panther. Joseph said the film was a "rare opportunity" for underserved children of color to see "a Black major ... comic book character" brought to film. Joseph promoted the drive with Boseman on The Ellen DeGeneres Show. The drive went on to raise over $45,000, exceeding its goal, with the money also funding other programs for children in Harlem. Joseph also started the "Black Panther Challenge" where he encouraged other people to create similar drives for their communities. GoFundMe made a centralized site for those wishing to start a drive for the challenge. 400 additional drives were started around the world, and the overall drive became the largest GoFundMe in history for an entertainment event, raising over $400,000. Many celebrities offered their support and contributions to the drives, including Ellen DeGeneres, Snoop Dogg, Chelsea Clinton, J. J. Abrams, Octavia Spencer, and British actress Jade Anouka.

In June 2018, the Smithsonian Institution's National Museum of African American History and Culture announced they had acquired several items from the film for their collection, including Boseman's Black Panther costume and a shooting script for the film signed by Coogler, Feige, Moore, and Cole. The museum said that the collection provides a "fuller story of Black culture and identity" by showing the progression of Black Americans in film, "an industry that [once] regulated them to flat, one-dimensional and marginalized figures." In conjunction with The Hollywood Reporter's Women in Entertainment Mentorship Program, and its partner the Greater Los Angeles chapter of Big Brothers Big Sisters, Walt Disney Studios created "The Black Panther Scholarship", worth US$250,000 to Loyola Marymount University. Boseman, Nyong'o, and Gurira presented the scholarship to its first recipient at The Hollywood Reporter's 2018 Women in Entertainment event in early December 2018.

==== African and African-American representation ====
Dwayne Wong (Omowale) writing in HuffPost saw the film and its comic origins as addressing "serious political issues concerning Africa's relationship to the West that is very rarely given the serious attention that it deserves", with Wakandans portrayed as suspicious towards outsiders. He concluded that while the country is fictional, the politics "are very real. The end of colonialism did not end Western tampering in Africa's politics". Carlos Rosario Gonzalez of Bam! Smack! Pow! said the struggle between T'Challa and Killmonger represents the collision of "what it means to be African" and "what Africa means to Afro-minorities today". In this view, Wakanda represents Africa without Western colonialism, and Killmonger shows us that "we can sometimes inevitably become what we seek to destroy," concluding that Killmonger wants to use Wakanda's resources to become a colonizer of the West while "Wakanda's conservative ways created the very problem that sought to destroy them, Erik Killmonger". Jelani Cobb, writing in The New Yorker, discussed the divide between Africans and African Americans, which he called a "fundamental dissonance". He felt T'Challa and Killmonger represented "dueling responses to five centuries of African exploitation at the hands of the West. The villain, to the extent that the term applies, is history itself". Cobb added that Black Panther is political in a way previous MCU films were not because in those "we were at least clear about where the lines of fantasy departed from reality [while this film is set in] in an invented nation in Africa, a continent that has been grappling with invented versions of itself ever since white men first declared it the 'dark continent' and set about plundering its people and its resources." Writing for The Atlantic, Adam Serwer argued against the assertion that Erik Killmonger was a representation for Black liberation, positing instead that he represented imperialism. He felt that this was emphasized through his actions, as Killmonger's attempts to take over several of the world's major cities notably include Hong Kong. Since China does not have a white Western hegemony in need of overthrowing, Killmonger's desire to conquer China was purely for the sake of power. Ultimately, he argues that "Black Panther does not render a verdict that violence is an unacceptable tool of Black liberation—to the contrary, that is precisely how Wakanda is liberated. It renders a verdict on imperialism as a tool of Black liberation, to say that the master's tools cannot dismantle the master's house."

Patrick Gathara, writing in The Washington Post, described the film as offering a "regressive, neocolonial vision of Africa", which—rather than a "redemptive counter-mythology"—offers "the same destructive myths". Gathara highlighted the Africa that is portrayed, still essentially a European creation, as being divided and tribalized, with Wakanda run by a wealthy and feuding elite that despite its advanced technical abilities does not have a means of succession beyond lethal combat. The Wakandans "still cleanly fit into the Western molds [of] a dark people in a dark continent" according to Gathara, and they "remain so remarkably unsophisticated that a 'returning' American can basically stroll in and take over ... [The film] should not be mistaken for an attempt at liberating Africa from Europe. Quite the opposite. Its 'redemptive counter-mythology' entrenches the tropes that have been used to dehumanize Africans for centuries." Christopher Lebron, in a piece for Boston Review, called the film racist because it depicts Black Americans who had been left in poverty and oppression, as exemplified by Killmonger, as still being "relegated to the lowest rung of political regard" in the film, treated as less deserving of empathy and less capable of their acts being deemed heroic, than even Ross's white spy. Lebron felt that T'Challa could have shown himself a good person by understanding how Killmonger was affected by American racism and T'Chaka's "cruelty", and could have agreed that justice sometimes requires violence as a last resort against oppression. He summed up by commenting that "In 2018, a world home to both the Movement for Black Lives and a president [Donald Trump] who identifies white supremacists as fine people, we are given a movie about Black empowerment where the only redeemed Blacks are African nobles [who] safeguard virtue and goodness against the threat not of white Americans or Europeans, but a Black American".

In Decolonize Museums, author Shimrit Lee writes that a scene that takes place early in the film, with Killmonger stealing from a museum, confronts how such institutions have benefited from colonialism. In addition to mentioning that artifacts were taken without compensation first, Killmonger's accomplice works at the museum's cafe, which Lee argues "points to the hierarchal divisions between a museum's 'diverse' service workers and its predominantly white curatorial staff".

=== Accolades ===
At the 91st Academy Awards, Black Panther received nominations for Best Picture, Best Original Song, Best Sound Editing, and Best Sound Mixing; and won Best Costume Design, Best Production Design and Best Original Score. The film's other nominations include a British Academy Film Award (which it won), twelve Critics' Choice Movie Awards (winning three), and three Golden Globe Awards. Its nominations for the Academy Award for Best Picture and Golden Globe Award for Best Motion Picture – Drama were firsts for a superhero film, while its Academy Award wins were the first for Marvel Studios and an MCU film. The National Board of Review and the American Film Institute named Black Panther one of the ten-best films of 2018. The film was the top entertainment Google Search of 2018 along with the sixth overall. In December 2021, its screenplay was listed number fifty-seven on the Writers Guild of America's "101 Greatest Screenplays of the 21st Century (So Far)". In June 2025, it ranked number 96 on The New York Times' list of "The 100 Best Movies of the 21st Century". In July 2025, it ranked number 52 on Rolling Stone's list of "The 100 Best Movies of the 21st Century."

==== Oscars campaign ====
By late August 2018, Disney hired Academy Award campaign strategist Cynthia Swartz to create a nomination campaign on behalf of the film for the 91st Academy Awards, with Feige and Marvel Studios said to have given the film a noteworthy budget for the awards season, an obligation which Marvel didn't consider for previous films. The campaign was focused to highlight "the film's creative accomplishments and the global impact it made" in the hopes of receiving a Best Picture nomination; the campaign was not altered with the announcement of the new Best Popular Film award, which appeared to be "designed to reward blockbusters like Black Panther" in the event they did not receive a Best Picture nomination. The Best Popular Film award was ultimately not implemented for the 91st Academy Awards, in order for the Academy of Motion Picture Arts and Sciences to "examine and seek additional input regarding" it. Glenn Whipp of the Los Angeles Times felt the "blueprint" for the film's Best Picture campaign was to "communicate to Oscar voters that this is an auteur-driven superhero movie possessing a deep significance both to its director and to people historically underrepresented in Hollywood films." Another Oscar campaign consultant felt reminding the Oscar voters Black Panther "wasn't just a movie, it was a phenomenon" would help the film earn a nomination. Another said voters "want to reward good movies and they also want to reward movies that say something significant and make the industry look good." The consultants also felt if Black Panther could earn multiple nominations in the craft award categories, it would bolster its chances for a Best Picture nomination; Whipp believed that Morrison, Beachler, Carter, Friend and Harlow, and Lamar all had the possibility to be nominated for Best Cinematography, Best Production Design, Best Costume Design, Best Makeup and Hairstyling, and Best Original Song, respectively. A few weeks later, Disney revealed their For Your Consideration list, with consideration in all Awards of Merit categories, aside from Best Actress and categories it was not eligible for, such as those for animation, short films, and documentaries.

Black Panther was ultimately nominated for seven Academy Awards, including Best Picture, Best Costume Design, Best Production Design, Best Original Score, Best Original Song (for "All the Stars"), Best Sound Editing, and Best Sound Mixing. The film was the first superhero film ever to be nominated for Best Picture, while Beachler's nomination for Best Production Design was the first for an African American. Feige called the Best Picture nomination "the highest form of recognition from our peers". On her nomination, Beachler said she felt "a certain responsibility. It means breaking down walls ... for young women of color and boys and girls of color to see that this is not impossible."

== Future ==
=== Sequels ===
A sequel, Black Panther: Wakanda Forever, was released on November 11, 2022, with Coogler returning as co-writer and director. Nyong'o, Gurira, Freeman, Wright, Duke, and Bassett reprise their roles, while Tenoch Huerta Mejía joined them as Namor. In August 2020, Boseman died from colon cancer; Coogler, Feige, and executives at Marvel Studios had been unaware of Boseman's illness. Feige stated in December 2020 that the role of T'Challa would not be recast, with Wright taking over as the lead in the sequel.

By November 2024, Coogler had had discussions with Denzel Washington about casting him for a role in a third film. The next month, Moore said he would return to produce Black Panther 3 with Marvel Studios after exiting his role with the studio in March 2025. At San Diego Comic-Con in July 2026, Feige and Coogler announced that David Jonsson had been cast as an adult version of T'Challa II / Toussaint, who would take on the mantle of Black Panther in Black Panther III. The film was scheduled for release on December 15, 2028, with Wright and Duke set to reprise their roles.

=== Television series ===
==== Eyes of Wakanda ====
In December 2023, Marvel Studios Animation announced Eyes of Wakanda, an animated series created in collaboration with Coogler's production company Proximity Media. In May 2024, Todd Harris was revealed to have created the series, and he serves as the director. He previously served as a storyboard artist at Marvel Studios. Eyes of Wakanda was released on Disney+ on August 1, 2025, and consists of four episodes. The series tells the story of Wakandan warriors, the Hatut Zaraze, who carry out dangerous missions around the world to retrieve vibranium artifacts throughout history, and features an ensemble cast.

==== Unproduced spin-off series ====
By February 2021, Coogler was developing a drama series set in Wakanda for Disney+ through Proximity Media. Gurira had signed on to star as Okoye in the series by May 2021, with it focusing on the character's origin story. The series was no longer being made by February 2025.

== See also ==
- "What If... T'Challa Became a Star-Lord?" and "What If... Killmonger Rescued Tony Stark?", episodes of the MCU television series What If...? that reimagine some events of this film
- List of Afrofuturist films
- List of black films of the 2010s
