= Parc Berthiaume-du-Tremblay =

Park in Quebec, Canada

Parc Berthiaume-Du-Tremblay
- Interactive map of Parc Berthiaume-Du-Tremblay
- Location: 4250 Boulevard Lévesque Ouest, Chomedey, Québec, Canada
- Coordinates: 45°31′46″N 73°44′50″W

Parc Berthiaume-Du-Tremblay is a park located in Chomedey, a suburb of Laval, Quebec, Canada a short distance from Montreal Island. It has a football/soccer stadium, Berthiaume-Du-Tremblay Stadium, and a baseball stadium.
