= Jabari =

Jabari is a masculine given name, derived from Swahili, ultimately from Arabic, that is most commonly given to African-American boys. It is also an Arabic surname.

Jabari is a borrowing from Swahili jabari meaning "brave (one)", which is from the Arabic word جَبَّار (jabbār), meaning "ruler".

== People ==
=== Given name ===
- Jabari Arthur (born 1982), Canadian football player
- Jabari Asim (born 1962), American author
- Jabari Bird (born 1994), American basketball player
- Jabari Blash (born 1989), American baseball player
- Jabari Brisport (born 1987), American activist
- Jabari Brown (born 1992), American basketball player
- Jabari Banks (born 1998), American actor
- Jabari Greer (born 1982), American football player
- Jabari Holloway (born 1982), American football player
- Jabari Hylton (born 1998), American soccer player
- Jabari Issa (born 1978), American football player
- Jabari Levey (born 1984), American football player
- Jabari Parker (born 1995), American basketball player
- Jabari Price (born 1992), American football player
- Jabari Simama, American educator
- Jabari Small (born 2002), American football player
- Jabari Smith (born 1977), American basketball player
- Jabari Smith Jr. (born 2003), American basketball player
- Jabari Walker (born 2002), American basketball player
- Jabari Wamble (born 1979), American lawyer
- Jabari Zuniga (born 1997), American football player

=== Surname ===
- Ahmed Jabari (1960–2012), Palestinian militant

== See also ==
- Abdul Jabbar
- Jabbar (disambiguation)
- Jabbari
