= Sapho (singer) =

French-Moroccan singer (born 1950)

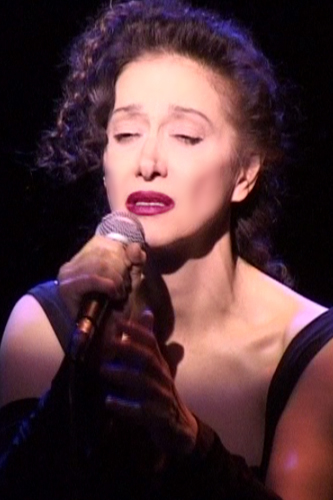

Background information
- Born: Danielle Ebguy; 1950 (age 75–76); Marrakesh, Morocco
- Origin: Paris, France
- Genres: Pop
- Occupation: Singer
- Years active: 1975–present
- Label: RCA
- Website: www.sapho.org

Danielle Ebguy (born 1950), known professionally as Sapho, is a French-Moroccan singer.

== Early life ==
Born in Marrakesh, Morocco, Sapho emigrated to France when she was 16. By age 18, she was living on her own in Paris, taking acting lessons, playing guitar and singing on the streets. A short time later, a musician friend convinced her to audition for famed music school, Le Petit Conservatoire de Mireille. Sapho soon abandoned her acting studies in favor of music. Her first LP, Le Balayeur du Rex, was released in 1977 by RCA.

== Career ==
After spending a year in New York, where she worked as a French reporter and played in different clubs, she went to London to record her second LP, Janis (1980). Sapho released three albums over the next three years, before taking a brief break to concentrate on a book featuring cartoons from the Brasserie La Coupole in Paris.

Sapho returned to music in 1985 with Passions, passons, which saw her leaving the rock sound of her previous albums to embrace the Middle Eastern sounds she had grown up with, leading to a series of concerts at Le Bataclan (Paris). There she began performing her arrangements of songs made popular by the great Egyptian singer Umm Kulthum. The next few years saw Sapho branching out further. Living for a while in Mexico, she released El Sol y la luna, which features a duet with the Argentinian singer, Jairo.

She published two novels, was involved in making a film about the children of the Intifada, and performed in a Threepenny Opera, all the while still performing and recording her own music. Starting in 1992, she focused on the music of Umm Kulthum, releasing a full album of that material and touring the world, even performing in Jerusalem in 1994.

Her next album, Jardin Andalou (1996), blended rock with Arabic and Andalusian elements. This was followed by Digital Sheikha, a more electronic-based album with Pat Jabbar and the contribution of Bill Laswell, for the Swiss label Barraka el Farnatshi. In 1999, La Route nue des hirondelles was released along with her third novel. She transformed La Route nue des hirondelles into a stage show, which she toured for the next couple of years, while also continuing with the Umm Kulthum material.

Returning to composition, Sapho worked and performed in Bagdad, Jerusalem, Nazareth and Gaza before recording Orients (2003) with a classical orchestra made of Jewish, Muslim and Christian musicians. In 2005, accompanied on stage by a flamenco guitarist, she focused on material by famous French songwriter and composer Léo Ferré. In 2006, the album Sapho chante Léo Ferré – Ferré Flamenco followed, featuring a song translated in Darija (Moroccan Arabic dialect). Her latest album, Universelle, in French, English and Darija is a kind of travel through all of her influences, from blues to traditional sounds.

== Discography ==
- 1975 Comment j'm'habille (45 single under the name of Louise Bastien)
- 1977 Le balayeur du Rex
- 1980 Sapho
- 1980 Le Paris stupide
- 1982 Passage d'enfer
- 1983 Barbarie
- 1985 Passions, passons
- 1986 Sapho Live au Bataclan
- 1987 El Sol y la Luna
- 1991 La Traversée du désir
- 1995 El Atlal (Sapho chante Oum Kalsoum)
- 1996 Jardin andalou
- 1997 Digital Sheikha
- 1999 La Route nue des hirondelles
- 1999 Sapho Live
- 2003 Orients
- 2006 Ferré Flamenco (Sapho chante Léo Ferré)
- 2008 Universelle
- 2011 Velours sous la terre
- 2018 Sapho chante Barbara
- 2022 Jalousie, Amour, Mort (J.A.M.)
- 2024 Sapho Live au New Morning

== Featurings ==
- 2008 Les Feuilles mortes (Jacques Prévert/Joseph Kosma), features on the album Le Retour..., by jazz composer Rodolphe Raffali
- 2008 Roman (poem by Arthur Rimbaud), features on the tribute album composed by the didgeridoo player Raphaël Didjaman
- 2004 Agir Réagir (Jean-Jacques Goldman/Daniel Berthiaume), collective single produced by the association Juste pour eux and the Secours populaire français to raise funds for the families of the victims of the 2004 Al Hoceima earthquake in Morocco
- 1987 Duerme Negrito (South American traditional / lyrics adaptation by Atahualpa Yupanqui) duet with the Argentinian singer: Jaïro, features on the album El Sol y la Luna
- 1986 Maman, j'aime les voyous (Guest appearance as the mermaid and soundtrack for Rue du départ, a film directed by Tony Gatlif)

== Books ==
- Guerre, Words y Plato, poems, La Différence, 2009 (ISBN 2729118470 / ISBN 978-2729118471).
- Juste avant de voir, poems and illustrations by Benjamin Levesque, Area, Paris, 2005 (ISBN 2352760208 / ISBN 978-2352760207).
- Le Livre des quatorze semaines, poems, La Différence, 2004 (ISBN 2729115056 / ISBN 978-2729115050).
- Un très proche Orient, manifest, Joëlle Losfeld, 2001 (ISBN 2844120881).
- Beaucoup autour de rien, novel, Calmann-Lévy, 1999 (ISBN 270212982X / ISBN 978-2702129821).
- Un mensonge, novel, Balland, 1996 (ISBN 2715808011 / ISBN 978-2715808010).
- Patio, opéra intime, novel, Stock, 1995 (ISBN 2234044359 / ISBN 978-2234044357).
- Ils préféraient la lune, novel, Balland, 1987 (ISBN 2715806248 / ISBN 978-2715806245).
- Sous la coupole, drawings, Ultramarine, 1985 (ISBN 2905779020 / ISBN 978-2905779021).
- Douce violence, novel, Ramsay, 1982 (ISBN 2859562575 / ISBN 978-2859562571).
