= Jabber =

To jabber means to babble incoherently.

Jabber may also refer to:

- The original name of the Extensible Messaging and Presence Protocol (XMPP), the open technology for instant messaging and presence
- Jabber.org, the public, free instant messaging and presence service based on XMPP
- Jabber XCP, a commercial product which is an implementation of XMPP. Acquired by Cisco Systems in 2008
- An abnormally long transmission on an Ethernet network or link

== See also ==
- Jabbar (disambiguation)
