= Kalateh-ye Jabbar =

Village in Razavi Khorasan, Iran

Kalateh-ye Jabbar كلاته جبار
- Village
- Location within Iran
- Coordinates: 35°33′26″N 59°50′31″E
- Country: Iran
- Province: Razavi Khorasan
- County: Fariman
- Bakhsh: Qalandarabad
- Rural District: Qalandarabad

Population (2006)
  - Total: 57
- Time zone: UTC+3:30 (IRST)
  - Summer (DST): UTC+4:30 (IRDT)

Kalateh-ye Jabbar (Persian: كلاته جبار, also Romanized as Kalāteh-ye Jabbār; also known as Jabbār) is a village in Qalandarabad Rural District, Qalandarabad District, Fariman County, Razavi Khorasan Province, Iran. At the 2006 census, its population was 57, in 12 families.
