= Daniel Berthiaume (singer-songwriter) =

Canadian musician

Daniel Louis Berthiaume
- Born: Montreal, Quebec, Canada
- Genres: Pop, jazz, blues, folk, rock, new age, electronica
- Occupation: Musician
- Instruments: Guitar, keyboard
- Website: www.danielberthiaume.com

Daniel Berthiaume is a Canadian musician. He was born in Montreal, Quebec. A guitarist, he also plays keyboards and sings in a multitude of musical styles (rock, pop, jazz, blues, folk, Ambient Music, New Age, electronica, etc.).

== Career ==
In the 1980s, Berthiaume travelled throughout Quebec with various groups, playing more than 400 concerts featuring covers of Supertramp, Genesis, U2, etc. and original compositions. It was during this period that he produced a first record entitled Yellow Street (Dance music) that was carried out in collaboration with DJ M.C. Mario. He also worked at that time with Allen McCartey (Men Without Hats), Steve Tracey (Loni Gamble, Céline Dion), Luc Phaneuf (Starmania), Yvan Payeur (Cirque du Soleil) and several other performers from Montreal.

He also wrote several music and sound tracks for corporate and advertising films. In the beginning of the 1990s, he was attracted by Ambient Music and quickly became prominent in this style. During this period, he produced seven albums—all nominated for the ADISQ award. He is now the lead singer and the lead guitarist with The Bluegators, featuring French drummer René Guérin and Kérassios Varipatis on doublebass.

== Discography ==
2012	Arizona	
2012	Les Grands Classiques	
2012	Zen in Provence	
2002	Les IV Éléments	
2001	Modern Classical	
2000	Night Music	
1999	The Nature of Silence	
1998	Ego	
1994	Nouveau Souffle	Nominated "ADISQ" 1995
1991	The Sacred Fire	Album of the year "ADISQ" 1992
1990	Le langage du corps	Nominated "ADISQ" 1991
1990	La voie intérieure	Nominated "ADISQ" 1991
1989	L'abre De Vie	
1988	Nuages	Nominated "ADISQ" 1989

== Collaborations as a songwriter ==
- Agir, Réagir (2004) — Featuring: Youssou N’Dour, Jean-Jacques Goldman, Sapho
- Je suis là (2005) — Featuring: Princess Erika and Marina Vial
- If (2009) — Featuring: Daniel Powter, Justin Nozuka, Lara Fabian, Natasha St-Pier

== Awards ==
In 1992, Berthiaume was awarded a Félix for The Sacred Fire as the album of the year, in the ambient/new-age category.
