= Gelareh Jabbari =

Iranian activist, actress and TV host

- گلاره جباری
- Born: Tehran, Iran
- Occupations: TV host, actress
- Employer: IRIB

Gelareh Jabbari (Persian: گلاره جباری) is an Iranian social activist, actress and TV host.

== Controversy ==
She is one of the presenters of Iranian television who reacted to the incident of the Ukrainian plane that killed 176 people and resigned from Iranian television.

== Social activity ==
She is also a social activist and works in the field of books to deprived areas of Iran.
