= Pat Jabbar =

Swiss-Moroccan producer and musician

Pat Jabbar is a Swiss-Moroccan producer, musician and founder of the record label Barraka el Farnatshi.

== Biography ==
Born in Hamburg, Germany, Jabbar grew up in Basel, Switzerland. In 1984 he discovered Arabic music in Israel. One year later, he went to Morocco, where he met many musicians.

In 1988, the first CD "El Buya" by Aisha Kandisha's Jarring Effects was released and published on Barraka El Farnatshi Prod. In 1992, he sent the CD to Bill Laswell, who wanted to work with Pat Jabbar and also helped him establish his record company. The name "Jabbar" derives from "abdeljabbar" which was the name given to Pat Jabbar by his Moroccan friends. Most of the CDs published on Barraka El Farnatshi Prod. are produced by Pat Jabbar himself and his collaborators; he also publishes CDs he licensed from other companies, among them works by Hamid Baroudi. Pat Jabbar also discovered Turkish rappers Makale from Basel and produced some of their music. He worked with French-Arabic chanteuse Sapho (singer), co-producing her album "Digital Sheikha". In late 2010s, he performed in a group, Maghrebika, consisting of himself and two Algerians now living in Switzerland, namely Abdelkader Belkacem and Abdelaziz Lamari.

In 2008, Jabbar started the project Kasbah Rockers (referring to The Clash song "Rock The Casbah"), described as a Moroccan artist collective melting: Algerian, Middle Eastern, Turkish and African (Somalia, Senegal, Cameroon) tribal roots with diverse styles of Electronica, as influences of dub, trip hop, psy trance and dance sounds. "Saharizona Ultraviolet", released in 2019, is a homage to Ennio Morricone & Tarantino debuted as a collection of singles. The collection featurEs diverse guests from the legendary Swiss/Moroccan Barraka label.

The collaborations with Somali singer Sam J Samatar & Bill Laswell, led to placements in Apple TV series "Little America" and hulu show "The Looming Tower". On their debut album from 2008, simply titled Kasbah Rockers with Bill Laswell, Bill Laswell played bass on 11 tracks, grooving along with eclectic artists such as Youssef El Mejjad from Amira Saqati, Maghrebika or Casus.

In 2023, a re-release of the Sheikha songs from Sapho album "Digital Sheikha", is entitled "The Sheikha Tracks Remastered".
