= Mahyar Jabbari =

Iranian footballer

Personal information
- Date of birth: 12 December 1998 (age 27)
- Place of birth: Tehran, Iran
- Height: 1.82 m (6 ft 0 in)
- Position: Defender

Team information
- Current team: Nirooye Zamini
- Number: 4

Youth career
- –2016: Sorkhpooshan
- 2016–2019: Paykan

Senior career*
| Years | Team | Apps | (Gls) |
| 2019–2023 | Saipa | 38 | (1) |
| 2023– | Nirooye Zamini | 41 | (1) |
- * Club domestic league appearances and goals as of 16 April 2025

Mahyar Jabbari (Persian: مهیار جباری; born 12 December 1998) is an Iranian footballer who plays as a defender for Nirooye Zamini in the Azadegan League.

== Club career ==
=== Saipa ===
He made his debut for Saipa in 4th fixtures of 2019–20 Iran Pro League against Pars Jam. After that in October 2019, he played against two others Iranian football clubs Esteghlal and Sepahan.
