= Magarnat-e Do =

Magarnat-e Do مگرنات دو
- Village
- Location within Iran
- Coordinates: 31°48′52″N 48°51′19″E
- Country: Iran
- Province: Khuzestan
- County: Shushtar
- Bakhsh: Shadravan
- Rural District: Shoaybiyeh-ye Sharqi

Population (2006)
  - Total: 201
- Time zone: UTC+3:30 (IRST)
  - Summer (DST): UTC+4:30 (IRDT)

Magarnat-e Do (Persian: مگرنات دو, also Romanized as Magarnāt-e Do; also known as Jabbār) is a village in Shoaybiyeh-ye Sharqi Rural District, Shadravan District, Shushtar County, Khuzestan Province, Iran. At the 2006 census, its population was 201, in 32 families.
