= Berthiaume-du-Tremblay Stadium =

Soccer stadium in Laval, Quebec

Berthiaume-Du-Tremblay Stadium
- Interactive map of Berthiaume-Du-Tremblay Stadium
- Location: 4250 Boulevard Lévesque Ouest; Chomedey, Québec
- Coordinates: 45°31′46″N 73°44′50″W
- Capacity: 3,500

Berthiaume-Du-Tremblay Stadium (French: Stade Berthiaume-du-Tremblay, pronounced [stad bɛʁtjom dy tʁɑ̃blɛ]) is an outdoor football and soccer stadium located in Parc Berthiaume-Du-Tremblay in Chomedey, a suburb of Laval, Quebec, Canada a short distance from Montreal Island.
