= Turkmun (Hazara tribe) =

Turkmun (Hazaragi: تورکمون) or Turkmani (تورکمنی) is a major tribe the ethnic Hazara people, primarily originating from and residing in Turkman Valley, what is now Parwan Province, Afghanistan. They speak their own distinct dialect of the Persian language, known as Hazaragi.

== History ==
Babur, the founder of the Mughal Empire in the early 16th century, mentioned this Hazara tribe in his autobiography as "Turkoman Hazaras".

== Notable people ==
- Commander Shafi Hazara
- Pahlawan Ebrahim Khedri
- Wakil Hussain Allahdad
- Abbas Noyan
- Mohaqiq Kabuli

== See also ==
- List of Hazara tribes
- First Campaign against Turkoman Hazaras
