= List of Afghan Transitional Administration personnel =

The Afghan Transitional Administration was established in June and July 2002. It was replaced with the election of a permanent government in 2004.

== President and chairman ==
- Hamid Karzai

== Vice presidents ==
- Hedayat Arsala
- Mohammad Qasim Fahim
- Abdul Karim Khalili
- Nematullah Shahrani

== Security advisors ==
- Yunus Qanuni
- Zalmay Rassoul

== Ministers ==
- Sayed Hussein Anwari (Agriculture)
- Mir Wais Saddiq (Son of Ismail Khan) (Air Transport/Tourism)
- Arif Nurzai (Border Affairs)
- Sayed Mustafa Kazemi (Commerce)
- Masum Stanakzai (Communication)
- Mohammad Qasim Fahim (Defense)
  - Abdul Rashid Dostum (Deputy Defense)
- Muhammad Yunus Qanuni (Education)
- Yusuf Nooristani (Environment) (U.S. citizen)
- Ashraf Ghani Ahmadzai (Finance) (U.S. citizen)
- Abdullah (Foreign Affairs)
- Mohammad Amin Naziryar (Hajj and Waqf)
- Dr. Soheila Siddiqi (Health)
- Sharif Fayez (Higher Education) (U.S. citizen)
- Sayed Makhdoom Raheen (Information/Culture) (Raheen is a U.S. citizen)
- Ali Ahmad Jalali (Interior) (since Jan. 2003) (U.S. citizen)
- Ahmed Yusuf Nuristani (Irrigation/Environment)
- Abdul Rahim Karimi (Justice)
- Noor Mohammad Qarqin (Labor/Social Affairs)
- Mohammad Alim Razm (Light Industries)
- Abdullah Wardak (Martyrs and Disabled)
- Juma Muhammad Muhammadi (Mines and Industries) (died in plane crash, February 24, 2003)
- Mohammad Mohaqeq (Planning)
- Mohammad Amin Farhang (Reconstruction) (German citizen)
- Inayatulah Nazeri (Refugees)
- Hanif Atmar (Rural Development)
- Said Mohammad Ali Jawid (Transportation)
- Yusuf Pashtun until August 16, 2003 (Urban Planning)
- Ahmed Shaker Kargar (Water and Electricity)
- Habiba Sarobi (Women's Affairs)
- Mahbooba Hoquqmal (State or Advisor-Minister for Women's Affairs)
- Gul Agha Sherzai after August 16, 2003 (Urban Affairs)

== Head of Supreme Court ==
- Fazl Hadi Shinwari

== Governors ==
- Ghazni province: Qari Baba
- Herat province: Ismail Khan until August 13, 2003
- Kabul province: Taj Mohammad Mujaahid
- Kandahar province: Gul Agha Sherzai until August 16, 2003; then Yusuf Pashtun
- Khost province: Hakim Taniwal (appointed by Karzai in April 2002)
- Kunar province: Sayyid Yusuf
- Nangarhar province: Gul Agha Sherzai replacing Hajji Din Muhammad (brother of late Hajji Qadir)
- Nimruz province: Abdul Karim Brahoui
- Paktia province: Taj Mohammad Wardak (appointed by Karzai in mid-February 2002)
- Zabul province: Hamidullah Tokhi until August, 2003; then Hafizullah Khan
- Anwar ul-Haq Ahadi (governor of the Afghan Central Bank)

Jawzjan Sayeed Ahmad Shah

== Afghan ambassadors and envoys ==
- To Australia: Mahmoud Saikal
- To Canada: Omar Samad, was Jalil Jamili
- To People's Republic of China: Rahi Barlas
- To Egypt: Abdul Ghafar Karzai
- To France: Dr. Zalmai Haquani
- To Germany: Hamidullah Nasir Zia
- To India: Massoud Khalili
- To Iran: Dr. Ahmad Moshahed
- To Italy: Mostapha Zair
- To Japan: Anwar Akbari
- To Pakistan: Nangyalai Tarzi
- To Russia: Ahmad Zia Massoud (Brother of Ahmad Shah Massoud)
- To Saudi Arabia: Anwar Neko
- To Tajikistan: Mohammad Dawod Panjshiri
- To Turkmenistan: Mohammad Nazir Qasimi
- To United Arab Emirates: Mr. Rashuddin
- To United Kingdom: Ahmad Wali Massoud
- To United Nations New York City: Dr. Rawan Farhadi
- To United Nations Geneva: Shams Ul-Zakir Kazimi
- To United States: Ishaq Shahryar; Chargé d' Affaires: Haroun Amin
- To Uzbekistan: Abdul Samad

== Foreign ambassadors and chargés d'affaires in Kabul ==
- People's Republic of China: Sun Yuxi
- European Union: Francesc Vendrell
- Germany: Rainer Eberle
- Pakistan: Rustam Shah Mohmand
- Saudi Arabia: Abdullah Fahd al-Kahlani
- Switzerland: Christian Dunant (in Islamabad)
- United Nations: Lakhdar Brahimi
- United States: Robert Finn
