= Mohammad Zahir Azimi =

Afghan spokesman

Mohammad Zaher Azimi
- محمد ظاهر عظیمی
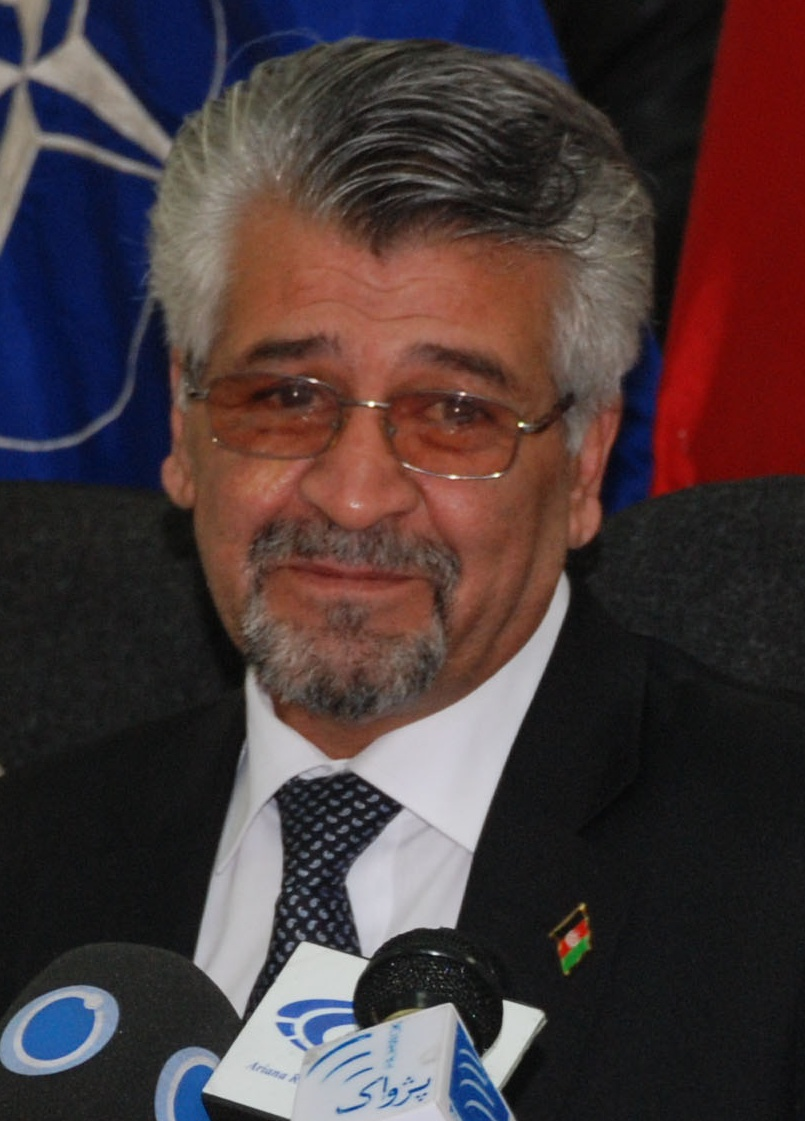

Spokesman and Cultural Advisor for the Ministry of Defense
- Incumbent
- Assumed office 2003

Personal details
- Born: Afghanistan
- Other political affiliations: Islamic Movement of Afghanistan
- Education: Afghan Army, Infantry Parachute School
- Occupation: Author, Military Officer

Military service
- Allegiance: Afghanistan
- Branch/service: Afghan Army
- Years of service: 1978–present
- Rank: Major General
- Battles/wars: Soviet-Afghan war; Afghan Civil War (1989-1992); Afghan Civil War (1996-2001)

Mohammad Zahir Azimi is the official spokesman for the Afghan National Army. He was promoted to the position by Commander-in-Chief of the Afghan Army Bismillah Khan Mohammadi following the establishment of the Afghan Islamic Republic in 2002.

Mohammad Zaher Azimi graduated from the Afghan Army, Infantry Parachute School as a 2nd Lieutenant in 1978. He joined the mujahideen in 1979 and was appointed as the leader of the Islamic Movement of Afghanistan‘s branch in the southwest region of Afghanistan. During this period of leadership he performed resistance activities in Herat province. In 1992, after the mujahideen victory and the overthrow of the Najbullah government, Azimi was promoted to the rank of Major General and assigned as the Recruiting Commander in Herat province.

During the fight against the Taliban, in 1999 and after the 2001 victory at Herat, General Azimi was once again assigned as Recruiting Commander in Herat province. In 2003 he was appointed as the Chief of the Parliamentary, Social Relations and Public Affairs in the Ministry of Defense. He is also a Spokesman and Cultural Advisor for the Ministry of Defense.

Azimi is one of the founders and members of the “Society and Professionals Committee of Herat”, and a member of the leadership board of the “Herat Literature Association”. He has published eight books; Attack of the East and the Politics of the West (chosen as the book of the year by the Ministry of Foreign Affairs in 2009); How the Taliban Came to Afghanistan, Afghanistan and the Roots of Pain, Herat and the Point of Mercy (second editions), and Hoot the Month of Brightness of Faith.
