= Battle of Sheikh Ali (1889) =

- Part of Hazara genocide
Date	1889
Location	Sheikh Ali
Result	Afghan victory

Belligerents
Abdur Rahman Khan: Andarabi Regiment	Sheikh Ali Hazaras

Strength
500 infantry units 200 Cavalry units	Unknown

Casualties and losses
Unknown	Unknown

The Battle of Sheikh Ali was a small battle between the Afghan Andarabi regiment and the Hazaras of Sheikh Ali. it resulted in a decisive victory for the Afghan Andarabi regiment.

The first Hazara uprising against Abdur Rahman took place between 1888 and 1890. When Abdur Rahman's cousin, Mohammad Eshaq, revolted against him, tribal leaders of the Sheikh Ali Hazaras joined the revolt. The revolt was short-lived and crushed as the Emir extended his control over large parts of Hazarajat. Leaders of the Sheikh Ali Hazaras had allies in two groups, Shia and Sunni. Abdur Rahman took advantage of the situation, pitting Sunni Hazara against the Shia Hazara, and made pacts among the Hazara.

After all of Sheikh Ali Hazaras' chiefs were sent to Kabul, opposition within the leadership of Sawar Khan and Syed Jafar Khan continued against the government troops, but at last, were defeated. Taxes were imposed and Afghan administrators were sent to occupied places, where they subjugated the people with abuses. People were disarmed, villages were looted, local tribal chiefs were imprisoned or executed, and the better lands were confiscated and given to Kochi people (nomads).
