= Qarlugh (Hazara tribe) =

Hazara tribe

Qarluq Hazaras
هزاره قرلق

Regions with significant populations
- Afghanistan: Ghazni, Kunduz, Baghlan, Badakhshan, Parwan (Sheikh Ali)

Languages
- Hazaragi (Dari Persian); historically Karluk Turkic dialects

Religion
- Predominantly Sunni (Hanafi); minority Shia

Related ethnic groups
- Hazaras, Turkic peoples, Karakhanids, Kipchaks

Qarlugh (Persian: قرلغ), Qarluq (Persian: قرلق) or Karluk is a tribe of the Hazaras.

Initially, the Qarluq Hazaras are reported to have followed Tengriism and Nestorian Christianity. With the spread of Islam in the region, they gradually converted, and by the 3rd century AH many had embraced Islam. Today, most reside in Afghanistan and are predominantly Sunni, although a minority adhere to Shia Islam.

== Origins and Historical Background ==
Various forms of the name including Qarluq, Qarlugh, Qarlïgh, and Karluk appear in historical sources. In Tarikh-i Jahan-gushay by Ata-Malik Juvayni, it is stated:

> “Qarluq, Qarlughan, Qarlugh, and Qarlïgh are different forms of one word, referring to a tribe of Turkic Hazaras known in the north and northeast of Transoxiana, reputed for their handsome appearance, tall stature, and well-proportioned physique.”

== Role in Political History ==
The Qarluq Hazaras are described as having played an important role in the political history of the region. They were involved in the formation of the Karakhanid state and later interacted with the Samanid and Ghaznavid dynasties. In the 13th century, the Qarlughids—said to have originated from the Qarluqs—ruled parts of present-day Afghanistan and Pakistan.

In the 8th century, the Qarluqs revolted against the Western Turkic Khaganate and formed a confederation with the Uyghur and Basmil tribes. This alliance eventually led to the establishment of the Karakhanid state, one of the earliest Islamic Turkic dynasties in Central Asia.

The Qarluqs had a dual political structure, divided into eastern and western branches. The eastern branch was based in Kashgar, while the western branch was centered in Balasaghun (in present-day Kyrgyzstan). The eastern ruler held the title Arslan (“lion”), and the western ruler held the title Bughra (“camel”).

== Geographic Distribution ==
Qarluq Hazaras are reported to have settled in several regions of Afghanistan, including Ghazni, Kunduz, Baghlan, Badakhshan, and Parwan (notably Sheikh Ali district), as well as other areas.

== Language and Culture ==
Historically, the language of the Qarluqs belonged to the Karluk branch of the Turkic language family, which later gave rise to languages such as Uzbek and Uyghur. These languages played significant administrative and cultural roles in various historical periods.

Today, the Qarluq Hazaras primarily speak Dari Persian in the Hazaragi dialect, which contains a considerable number of Turkic loanwords.

Among Qarluq Hazaras residing in Ghazni Province, most are Shia, while in other regions they are predominantly Sunni.

== See also ==
- List of Hazara tribes
- Sheikh Ali (Hazara tribe)
- Hazaras
- Karluks, Turkic tribal confederacy
