= Abbas Noyan =

Hazara politician

Abbas Noyan عباس نویان
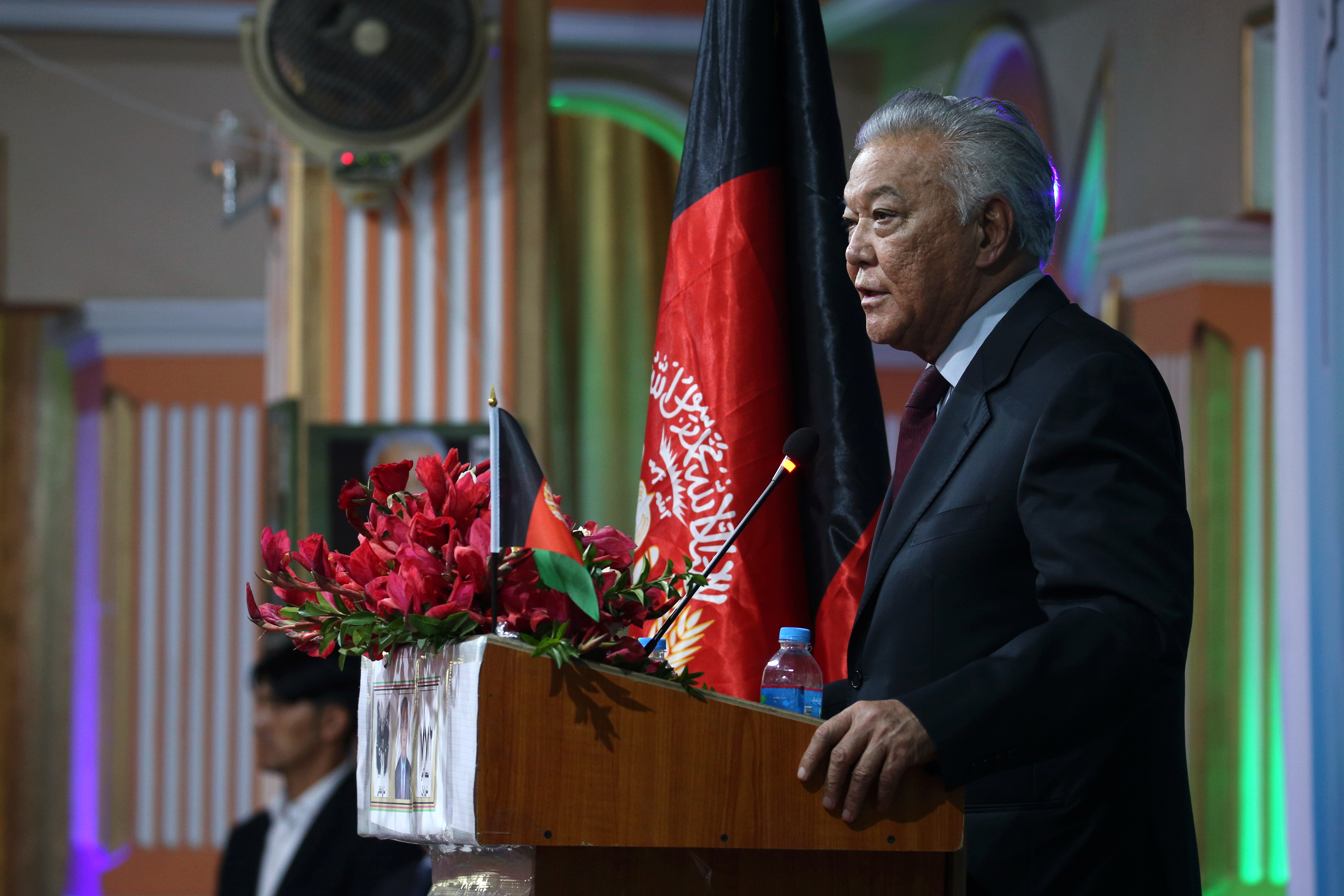
- Noyan giving speech at a rally in Kabul in October 2018.

Member of Parliament
- In office 2005–2010

Personal details
- Born: Abbas Turkman Valley, Surkhi Parsa District, Parwan Province, Kingdom of Afghanistan
- Party: Truth and Justice
- Education: Kabul Polytechnic University
- Occupation: Politician, Engineer
- Ethnicity: Hazara

Abbas Noyan (Dari: عباس نویان) is an ethnic Hazara politician. He was Afghanistan's ambassador to Sweden from 2019 to 2024. He stepped down at the end of 2024 at the request of the Swedish government. Previously he served as a Member of Parliament to Wolesi Jirga, the lower house, representing the people of Kabul province from 2005 to 2010. In 2005, he ranked seventh among candidates from Kabul province, quickly rising to one of the most prominent and active representatives at the Wolesi Jirga. During his tenure, he advocated for women's rights, education for all, a responsive and accountable government, and a strong rule of law. Noyan has worked across ethnic and sectarian divides in representing his constituents, and sought to bridge those divides by establishing a multi-ethnic political party.

== Early life and education ==
Abbas Noyan hails from Turkman Valley of Parwan province and grew up in Kabul. He was born into a politically active family; his father Haji Saleh Mohammad Khan was one of the elders of Hazaras and served as a Member of Parliament during Dawood Shah's reign. Abbas Noyan became politically active while still in high school, fighting against systematic discrimination of minority groups and for a responsive and accountable government for all. For his peaceful political protests, he was briefly imprisoned, suspended from school, and dispatched to serve his mandatory military service in the Asmar district of Kunar province, one of the most dangerous parts of the country.

Abbas Noyan went on to study civil engineering at Polytechnic Institute. His classmates included Ahmad Shah Masood and Gulbuddin Hekmatyar.

== Family life and career ==
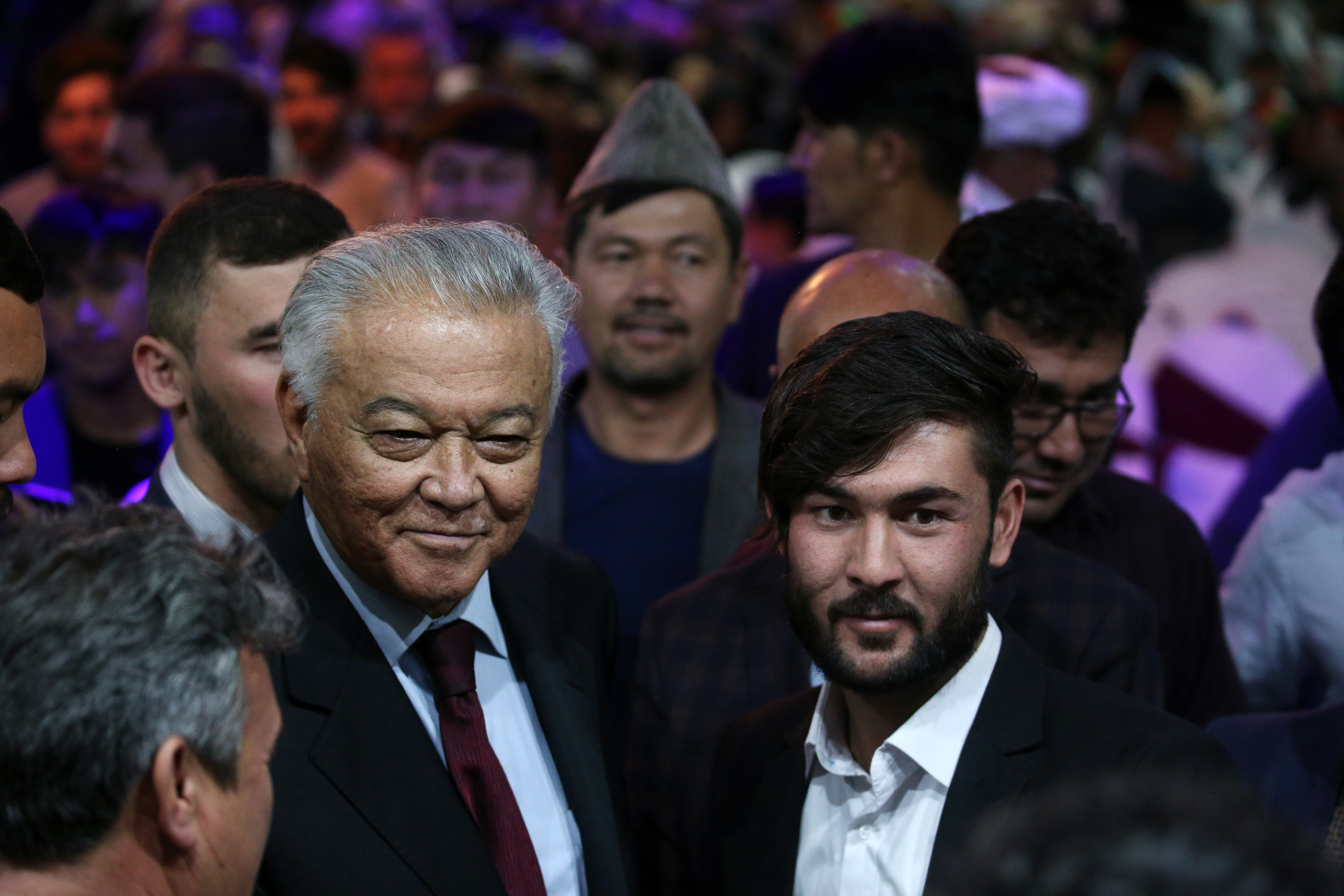
Abbas Noyan at a campaign rally in Kabul in October 2018.

At the time of Abbas's graduation from university, the country was becoming increasingly socially and politically unrestful. To suppress the population, the communist regime of Hafizullah Amin decreed the elimination and execution of any person with influence and prominence and who fought for the human and political rights of the people. In 1978, Haji Saleh Mohammad Khan and his three sons were taken away in the middle of the night by the secret police and executed. Abbas barely escaped capture. The family learned of the fate of Haji Saleh and his sons 35 years later including the place of their mass burial.

Abbas Noyan became the sole provider for his extended family. He started his business and ran it in Russia, U.S., Japan, and the U.A.E. After establishing himself in business, he returned to his country in 2005 and ran for parliament.

Abbas Noyan is identified as progressive and reformist. He represented the Kabul province in parliament, becoming one of the most vocal critics of widespread corruption. He advocated for women's rights and the elimination of violence against women.

After his term at the national assembly, he founded the Truth and Justice political party (also known as Rights and Justice) together with Hanif Atmar, Ehsanullah Zia, Sima Samar, Mohammad Sardar Roshan, and Hamidullah Farooqi. The party successfully supported Ashraf Ghani's bid to the presidency in 2014.

== Personal ==
A lifelong supporter of education, he sits on the board of Marefat High School.

Noyan has three sons and two daughters. Currently he lives in Stockholm, Sweden with his family.

== See also ==
- Truth and Justice
- List of Hazara people
