= Daud Shah Saba =

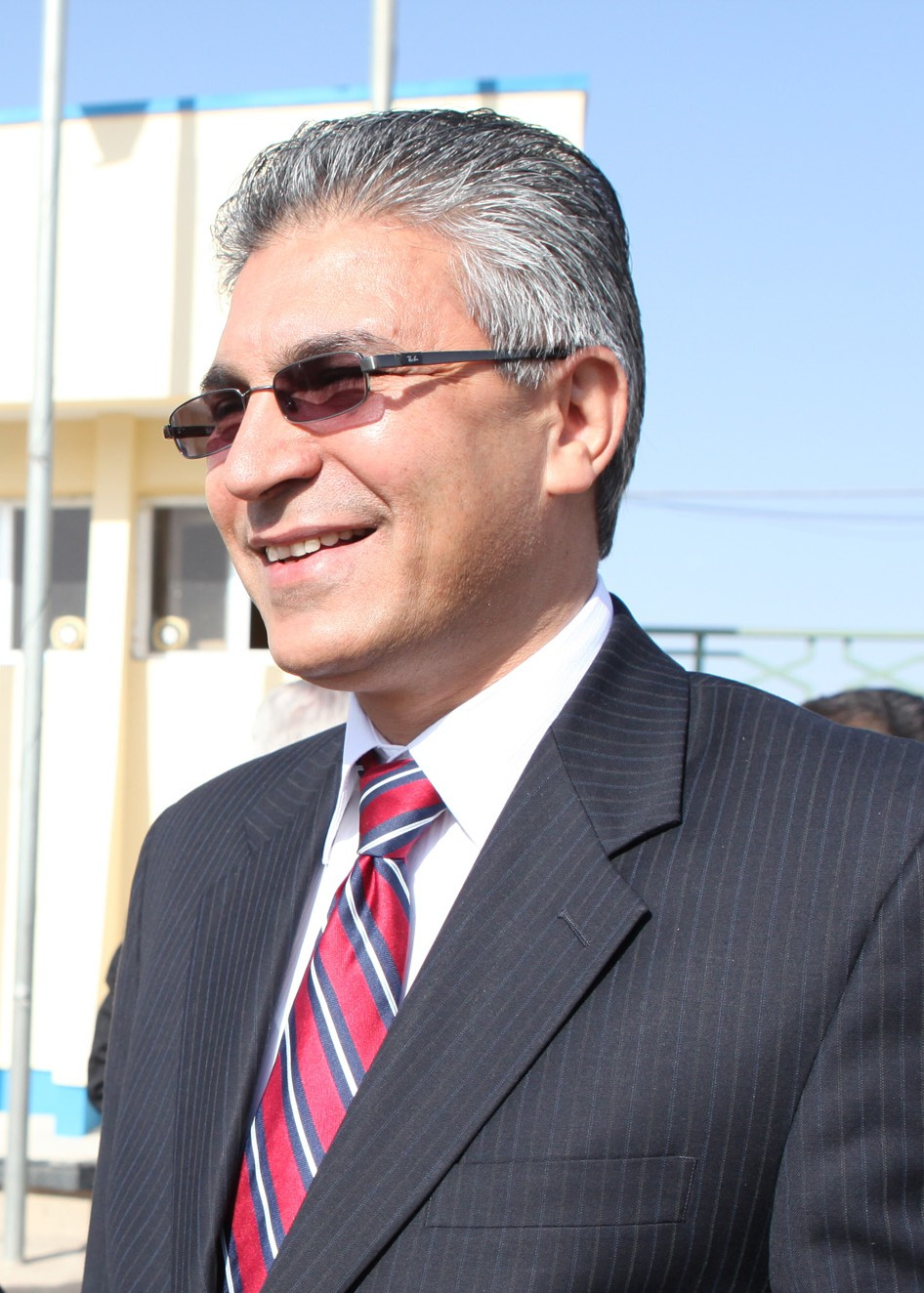
- Daud Shah Saba in October 2011

Governor of Herat Province, Afghanistan
- In office 3 September 2010 – 3 July 2013
- Preceded by: Ahmad Yusuf Nuristani
- Succeeded by: Fazlullah Wahidi

Personal details
- Born: 1964 (age 61–62) Herat, Kingdom of Afghanistan

Daud Shah Saba (born 1964) is a politician in Afghanistan, who served as Governor of Herat Province from August 2010 to July 2013 when his predecessor Ahmad Yusuf Nuristani had resigned from the post.

== Early years and education ==
Daud Shah Saba was born in 1964 in Herat, Afghanistan. He belongs to the Popalzai Pashtun tribe. After finishing primary school, he attended the Kabul Polytechnic Institute and obtained a MS in Economic Geology in 1986. He taught in the same institute for six years. In 1996, he travelled to India where he obtained a Ph.D. in Earth Science from the University of Mumbai. He is able speak Dari (Persian), Pashto, English and Hindi.

== Later years and careers ==
In 2000, Saba published a book Gozar Az Tangna, which is about his vision of sociopolitical situation in Afghanistan. He served as the President of Afghan Green Leave Consulting, LLC, which is a Kabul based consulting firm registered with the Afghanistan Investment Support Agency. It was established in 2009 by Daud Saba and Martijn Hekman, an international development expert.

Saba is an Afghan Canadian who has been involved for about 20 years in international development, natural resources and environmental management, with a focus in Afghanistan. He has worked with many international firms and implemented projects in most of the provinces of Afghanistan. Saba has recently served as the Human Development Advisor to the President Hamid Karzai. On 24 August 2010, Saba was appointed by President Karzai as Governor of Herat province after former governor, Muhammad Yousuf Nuristani, began running for in the 2010 parliamentary election.

== See also ==
- List of governors of Herat
- Herat Province
- Herat

Preceded by Ahmad Yusuf Nuristani	Governor of Herat Province, Afghanistan; 3 September 2010 – present	Succeeded by [Incumbent]
