= Commander Shafi Hazara =

Hazara military commander (1964–1996)

Sardar Commander Shafi Hazara قومندان شفیع هزاره
- Shafi شفیع
- Born: Muhammad Shafi محمد شفیع; March 1964; Chindawol, Kabul, Afghanistan
- Died: 22 August 1996 (aged 32); Bamyan, Afghanistan
- Cause of death: Assassination
- Burial place: Dahan Khakrez cemetery, Turkman Valley, Parwan Province
- Children: Muhammad Rafi Shafi
- Military career
- Allegiance: Hezbe Wahdat
- Rank: Brigadier General
- Nicknames: Shafi Dewana شفیع دیوانه
- Unit: Brigade Two

Signature
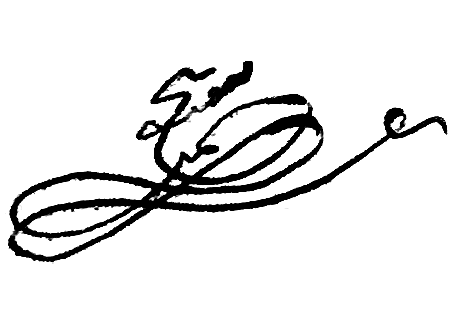

Commander Shafi Hazara (Dari/Hazaragi: قومندان شفیع هزاره; March 1964 – 22 August 1996) was an ethnic Hazara military commander in Afghanistan. He was a senior commander during the resistance of west Kabul and Hazarajat between 1991 and 1996. In the 1990s, he led Hezb-e-Wahdat's "Brigade 2" military wing against rival militias and, against the Taliban takeover.

== Early life ==
Shafi was born in March 1964 in Chindawol, Kabul, originally from the Turkman Valley, Parwan Province. He went to Parsa Elementary School and Ansari High School.

== Military career ==
After graduating, Shafi went to his home village in the Turkman Valley, and joined Sazman Al-Nasr in Jihad against the Soviet Armed Forces during the Soviet–Afghan War.

=== Kabul ===
On May 1, 1992, Shafi returned to Kabul and formed an initial six-man unit with which he started his armed struggle against the remnants of the government of the Democratic Republic of Afghanistan. He captured the state security office department, the Ministry of Interior, the sixth security district, and Mahtab Qala and Dasht-e Barchi security checkpoints. Additionally, Hezbe Wahdat and Harakat-e-Islami managed to seize Scud missiles from the Afghan National Army’s 99th Missile Brigade, although they did not have the skills required to operate their newly-acquired missiles as the operators managed to flee. This resulted in the Scud missiles only being used for display during parades.

Soon, he would become one of the senior commanders of Hezbe Wahdat. Shafi formed the Brigade Two infantry unit. It was not long before hundreds of young men, primarily of Hazara ethnicity, joined him. In the first war, they cleared the opposition from many areas of west Kabul. After gaining many resources, which included all kinds of light and heavy weapons. Under Shafi's command, Brigade Two forces managed most of the front and strategic defense lines of west Kabul. He participated in essential operations as a prominent and leading commander. In May 1992, clashes between Hezb-e-Wahdat and Ittihad-i Islami began, engaging in street battles and firing rockets at each other. Some observers believe the skirmishes began when Ittihad and Wahdat forces tore down posters of each other’s leaders, Abdul Ali Mazari and Abdul Rasul Sayyaf. These battles, including those between other factions such as Jamiat-e Islami and Hezb-e Islami Gulbuddin, led to thousands of civilian deaths and damage to infrastructure, causing hundreds of thousands to flee Kabul for safer areas.

Shafi, due to his exceptional military tactics, angered multiple of his adversaries, primarily the Sunni mujahideen faction Hezb-e Islami Gulbuddin. He would continuously put himself in danger by standing on top of containers and running towards the opposition, resulting in his enemies calling him "Shafi Dewana", meaning Shafi the Mad in Dari. Additionally, Shafi and his infantry brigade ran a prison compound in Kabul known as “Qala Khana”, in which POWs of Tajik and Pashtun ethnicity were tortured and executed. There were also allegations of Hezb-e-Wahdat burning prisoners in brick-making furnaces in the prison compound.

When the Taliban emerged in Afghanistan, they entered Ghazni from Kandahar. With three to four hundred of his soldiers, Shafi entered Ghazni to fight the Taliban and confronted them, killing dozens of Taliban members. The Taliban repeatedly confessed to Hezb Wahdat representatives that they had minimal casualties while managing to capturing several provinces. However, in Ghazni, Shafi had killed dozens of Taliban soldiers. After a few months of fighting, his unit retreated to Kabul.

=== Post-Kabul ===
After the fall of the west Kabul resistance and the death of Abdul Ali Mazari, Shafi went to Peshawar, Pakistan, and from there to Mazar-e-Sharif, where he spent some time buying weapons, regrouping, and gathering his forces. After the funeral of Abdul Ali Mazari, Shafi entered Hazarajat and went into battle with the Taliban and rival factions. He established security throughout the central areas of Afghanistan. He set several checkpoints and bases. Some of his most essential headquarters were located in Shekh Ali District, Turkman Valley, Haji Gak Pass, and Bamyan.

== Death ==
Shafi was killed on 22 August 1996. His assassination took place in the home of Karim Khalili in Central Bamyan. Karim Khalili and his collaborators allegedly killed Shafi and coincidentally attacked his Six Bridge post, killing one soldier and wounding many. His assassination is acknowledged as a betrayal by the Hazara people, however many essential details still have remained unclear. He was buried in Bamiyan by the local people but later transferred to his hometown by his soldiers and body rests in the Dahan Khakrez cemetery in Turkman Valley.

== See also ==
- Mehdi Mujahid
- Afghanistan conflict (1978–present)
- List of Hazara people
