= Truth and Justice (Afghanistan) =

Truth and Justice Party Hezb-e-Haq-wa-Adalat
- Leader: Mohammad Hanif Atmar
- Founded: 2011
- Dissolved: 2021
- Ideology: Multi-ethnic; Anti-corruption; Reformism; Eurasianism
- Political position: Center
- Colours: Purple

The Truth and Justice Party or Hezb-e-Haq-wa-Adalat (Dari: حزب حق و عدالت) (also known as Rights and Justice Party) was a political party in Afghanistan. The party was multi-ethnic. Its members came from various ethnic groups, representing the Pashtuns, Tajiks, Hazaras, Uzbeks, Balochs and Nuristanis. Although led by a leadership council, the most prominent member and possible presidential candidate from the party is Hanif Atmar, a former interior minister under President Hamid Karzai and National Security Advisor under President Ashraf Ghani.

== History ==
The party was founded in 2010 by Atmar and Abbas Noyan as a reformist opposition to the government of President Karzai. The former interior minister and former people's representative came together to create a multi-ethnic political party, advocating against rampant corruption that had resulted in increased insecurity and economic underdevelopment. The party was officially launched in late 2011 after 14 months of preparation leading up to the official announcement at a two-day conference of 420 delegates. The party announced itself to be "reformist" and "opposition;" though there was no manifesto or policy direction issued at its launch. According to Radio Free Europe, the party seeks to challenge the Change and Hope party led by Abdullah Abdullah in opposition to the government of President Hamid Karzai and its rampant corruption.

One of its spokesmen, Hamidullah Farooqi, stated that the party seeks to "fulfill people’s hopes and needs in the political, economic, and social spheres of life. Those values that have unfortunately been neglected by the current government. We hope our political formation will be a healthy opposition in the political arena."

The party's official launch a week before the commencement of the traditional Loya Jirga called by Karzai and just before the Bonn Conference in December was read as a show of force of their presence and that they have say in the Afghanistan's future.

The party was dissolved in 2021 after the Fall of Kabul.

=== Reactions ===
An Afghan political analyst, Nasrullah Stanekzai, suggested the party would struggle to gain legitimacy as "people in Afghanistan have had very bad experiences with political parties in the past. Between 1978 [when leftists gained power] until the period of the mujahedin [sic], not only have political parties not worked for the people, but they have actively worked against them bringing them war and destruction." He added that the political culture in Afghanistan would need more time to develop following years of political turmoil. Another local political commentator, Yunus Fakor, said that the emergence of new blocs in Afghan politics, including the Truth and Justice party and the National Front of Afghanistan, was a "positive trend" ahead of the 2014 presidential election.

However, another political activist and former chief of staff of the Foreign Ministry, Wahid Monawar, said that there was no clear direction of the party as "communicating one's platform is a vital part of any political party or campaign in order to succeed. While critique of [the] Karzai administration is a departing point, it's fundamentally important to communicate one's platform. I was hoping to read some ideas on how to influence policies that are different than Karzai's." The party was also criticised for its lack of an agenda or debate against the incumbent government.

== Issues ==
Truth and Justice, in opposition to Change and Hope, seeks reconciliation talks with rebel groups on the premise that they would be transparent and will not "sacrifice justice." It also said that it would support further cooperation with international forces as led by International Security Assistance Force (ISAF) within the country, but would insist on Afghan sovereignty and the maintenance of regional relationships and the US-Afghan strategic agreement. It also says it supports traditional system of the Loya Jirga in place and the "constitutional right" of the president, even though the constitution does not have such a privilege.

== Leadership ==
There are 45 members of its interim council. Its four Sardar Roshan is the head and Asadullah Walwaji is the deputy head of the party.

=== Notable members ===
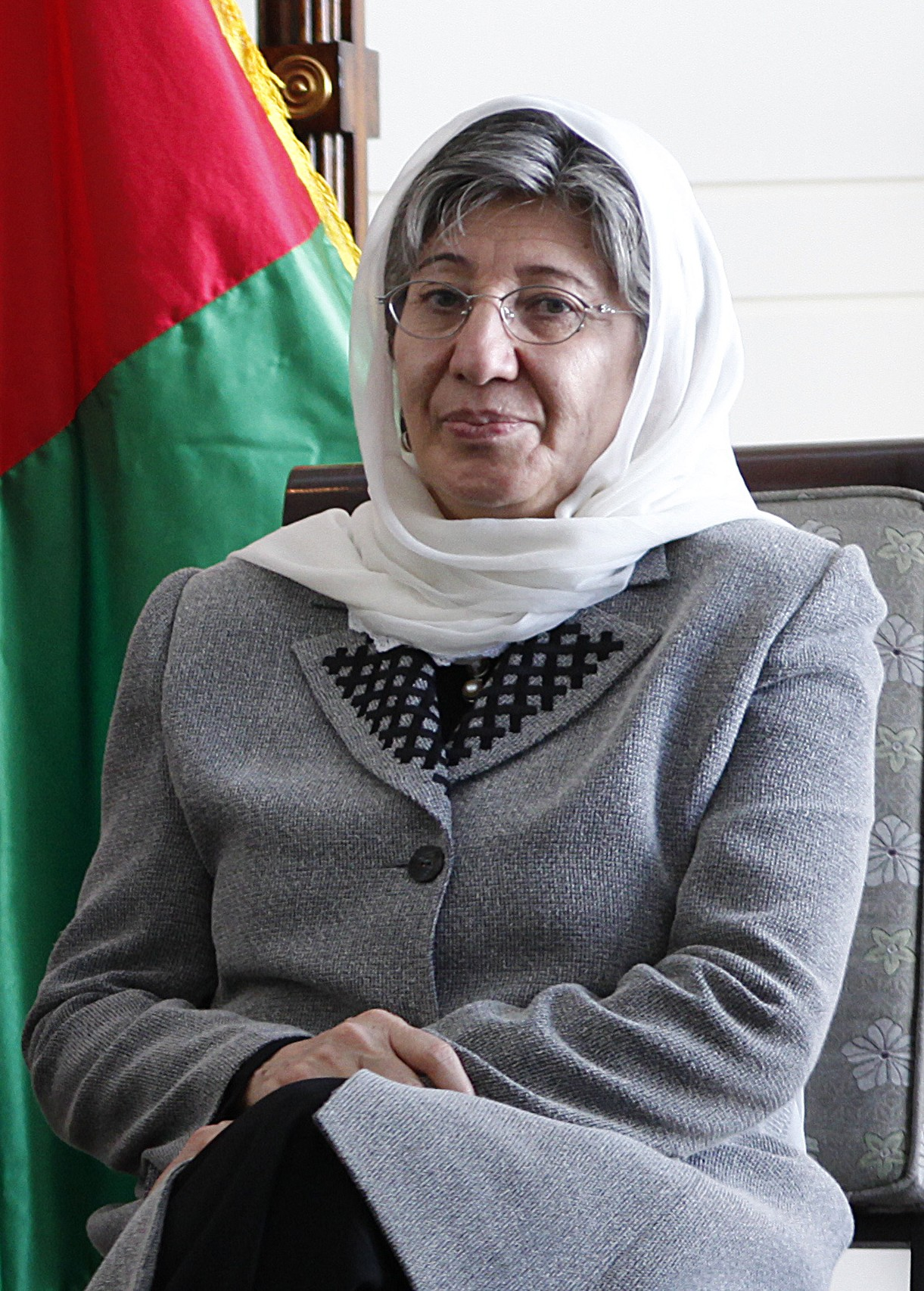
Sima Samar, a notable Hazara member of the party.

Notable members include Sima Samar, a woman's and human rights advocate, activist and a social worker within national and international forums, who served as Minister of Women's Affairs of Afghanistan from December 2001 to 2003. She is currently the Chairperson of the Afghan Independent Human Rights Commission (AIHRC), and, from 2005 to 2009, United Nations Special Rapporteur on the situation of human rights in Sudan[1]

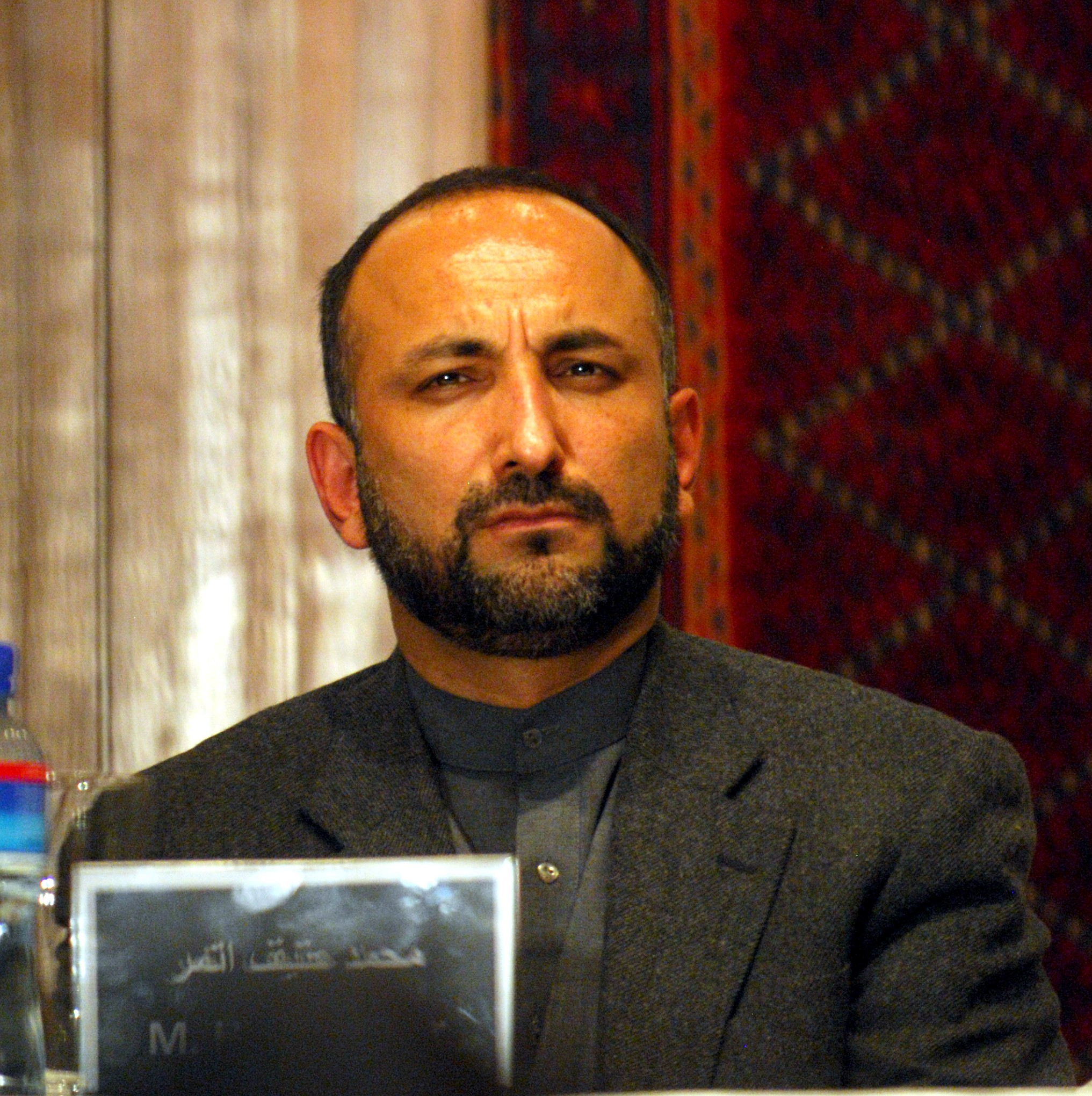
Mohammad Hanif Atmar, a notable Pashtun member of the party who was once the Interior Minister.

Other prominent members Hanif Atmar, Abbas Noyan, former Member of Parliament, Ehsan Zia, former Minister of Rural Rehabilitation and Development, Hamidullah Farooqi, former Minister of Transport and Civil Aviation, Sardar Roshan, Advisor to the President, and Kabir Ranjbar, who dissolved his Democratic Party to join the Truth and Justice party.

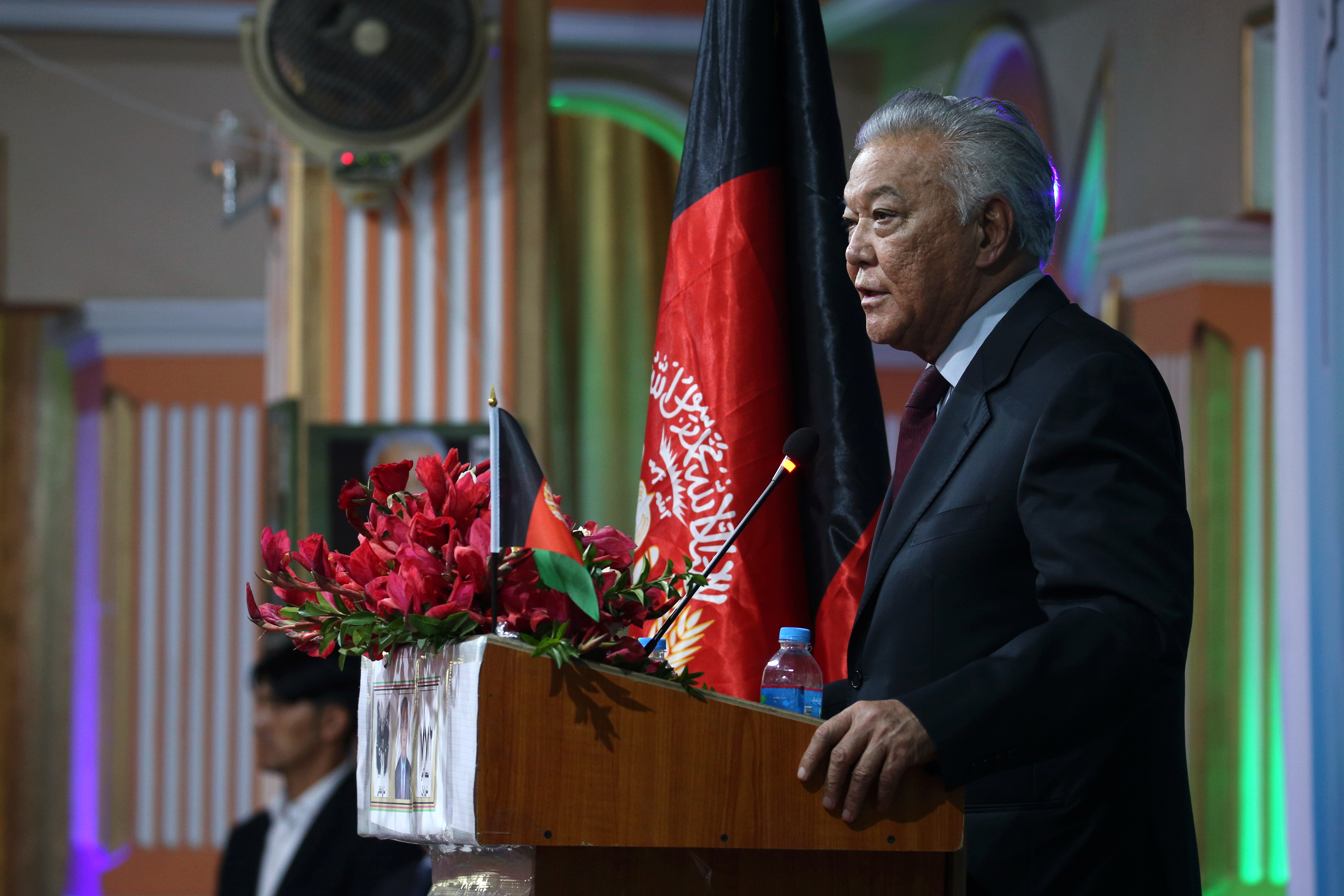
Abbas Noyan, a prominent Hazara member, giving speech at a rally
