= First Campaign against Turkoman Hazaras =

Date	December 28, 1505 – January, 1506 CE
Location	Banks of the Baran River near the Hindu Kush mountains, Northern Afghanistan
Result	Mughal victory

Belligerents
Timurids of Kabul	Hazaras; Turkoman tribe

Commanders and leaders
Babur; Sheikh Dervish ''Kokaltash'' †; Muhammad Ali Mubashar Beg †; Qasim Beg; Kupuk Kuli Baba; Sultan Kuli Chanak; Khatim Qurbegi; Yarek Taghai; Ahmed Yusuf Beg	Unknown

The First Campaign against Turkoman Hazaras was a Mughal Empire campaign against Hazaras in the 16th century. Following Babur's departure from Kabul for Qalat, the Hazaras took advantage of his absence to raid his territories. After Babur had returned to Kabul from his victory at the Battle of Qalat, he remained encamped in the Chaharbagh during the harsh winter of 1505 CE where he planned to make an excursion against them. He then went into Kabul city into the palace of Ulugh Beg Mirza, called Bostān-Serāi, prepared for the campaign and set out from there on December 28, 1505 CE.

== Campaign ==
Babur had sent an advance party, which made a sudden attack on a small party of Hazaras at Jangalak, in the mouth of the valley of Hindu Kush in Panjshir, and dispersed them. A few Hazaras had lain in ambush in a cave near the valley of Hindu Kush. Sheikh Dervish Kokaltash had gone up close to the mouth of this den, without suspecting anything, when a Hazara from within shot him in the chest with an arrow; he died of his injuries later.

The main body of the Hazaras had erected their winter habitations in the valley of Hindu Kush. The valley is a particular kind of glen. For about half a mile from its mouth there is a strait, which makes it necessary for the road to pass along the face of the hill. Below this road is a precipice of fifty or sixty yards perpendicular descent. Higher up than this road runs a pathway, by which one horseman only can pass at a time. Babur having passed this strait, proceeded forward the same day till between Dhuhr (noon) and Asr (afternoon) prayers, he stopped to rest his army.

Next morning, he began to approach the place where the Hazaras had taken up their winter quarters. It was about 9:00 a.m. when a man came from the advance with information, that, in a narrow defile, the Hazaras had fortified and strengthened a ford with branches of trees, and had stopped the advance of Babur's troops who were now engaged with them. On hearing this, Babur marched, reached the place where the Hazaras had made their stand, and were in hot action. That winter the snow lay very deep, which rendered it dangerous to leave the common road. The banks of the stream, about the ford, were all covered with ice; and it was impossible to pass the river at any place off the road, on account of the ice and snow. The Hazaras had cut down a number of branches of trees, with which they had fortified the opposite landing-place. They ranged themselves both on horseback and foot, as well in the channel along the banks of the river, and maintained the fight by discharges of arrows. Muhammad Ali Mubashar Beg had advanced near to the place where the road was blocked up by the branches, he was struck by an arrow in the back, and died on the spot.

Babur and the main body of his troops were trying to catch up to the advance when they were hit by volleys of arrows. He and another officer were narrowly missed. At that moment, Qasim Beg, with the right wing, discovered a place where the stream could be crossed, and having gained a footing on the opposite side, no sooner pushed on his horse to the charge, than the Hazaras, unable to keep their ground, took to flight. The party that had got in among them, followed them in close pursuit, dismounting and cutting numbers of them down. Sultan Kuli Chanāk went in pursuit of them, but it was impossible to leave the road on account of the quantity and depth of the snow. Babur too accompanied the pursuers; and fell in with the sheep and herds of horses of the Hazaras, near their winter habitations. He took between four or five hundred sheep, and twenty or twenty-five horses for himself.

== Aftermath ==
The wives and little children of the Hazaras escaped on foot to the snow-covered hillocks. The army then halted at the huts of the Hazaras. The winter snow lay very deep. Off the road, it reached up to the horses’ cruppers; the picket appointed for the night-watch round the camp were obliged to remain on horseback till daybreak, in consequence of the depth of the snow.

Next morning, Babur and his army began to move back, and passed the night in the winter huts of the Hazaras. From there he halted at Jangalak. Yārek Taghāi was directed to proceed and take the Hazāaras who had shot Sheikh Dervish. These Hazaras were still hiding in the cave. Yarek Taghai and his men, on coming up, filled the cave with smoke, took seventy or eighty Hazaras, and killed most of them. On finishing this inroad against the Hazaras, Babur moved down the river Baran, into the vicinity of Ai-Tughdi, for the purpose of collecting the revenue of Nijrau.

== See also ==
- Campaign against Sultan Masudi Hazaras
- Turkman Valley

== Sources ==
- Babur, Zahir-ud-din Muhammad (1826). Memoirs of Zahir-ud-din Muhammad Babur, Emperor of Hindustan. Longman.
- Haidar, Dughlát Muhammad (1895). The Tarikh-i-rashidi: A History of the Moghuls of Central Asia; an English Version. S. Low, Marston and Company.
