= Sayed Hussein Anwari =

Afghan politician (1956–2016)

Sayed Hussein Anwari سید حسین انوری
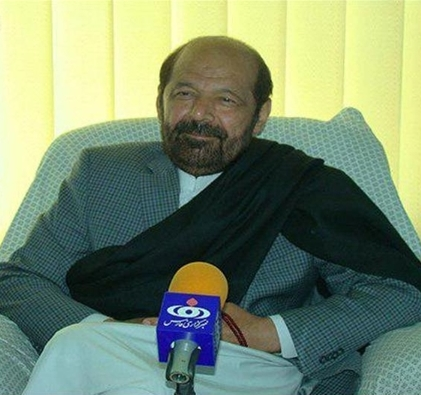
- Hussein Anwari

Member of the Wolesi Jirga
- In office 2005 – 5 July 2016

Governor of Herat Province
- In office 2005–2009
- President: Hamid Karzai
- Preceded by: Sayed Muhammad Khairkhwa
- Succeeded by: Ahmad Yussef Nuristani

Minister of Agriculture
- In office 24 June 2002 – 7 December 2004
- President: Hamid Karzai
- Succeeded by: Obaidullah Rameen

Minister of Social Affairs and Labor
- In office 1992–1995
- President: Burhanuddin Rabbani
- Prime Minister: Arsala Rahmani Daulat; Gulbuddin Hekmatyar; Abdul Sabur Farid Kohistani

Personal details
- Born: 1956 Shekh Ali, Parwan Province, Kingdom of Afghanistan
- Died: 5 July 2016 (aged 59–60) India
- Cause of death: Cancer
- Party: Islamic Movement of Afghanistan

Military service
- Allegiance: Islamic Movement of Afghanistan (until 1992); Islamic State of Afghanistan (1992–2001)
- Battles/wars: Soviet War in Afghanistan; Afghan Civil War

Sayed Hussein Anwari (Dari: سید حسین انوری) (1956 – 5 July 2016) was an Afghan politician. He was a Shia and came from Mohammed Asef Mohseni's Harakat-e Islami (Islamic Movement party).

== Early life ==
Anwari, an ethnic Sadat from banu Hashim, was born in Shekh Ali District of Parwan Province and was educated as a teacher in Kabul.

== Career ==
He was Minister of Social Affairs and Labor from 1992 to 1995. He fought with the Northern Alliance from 1995 to 2001 against the Taliban and became chief military commander of Harrakat-e-Islami in Afghanistan during that time.

=== Minister of Agriculture ===
After Kabul was taken by the Northern Alliance in 2001, he was appointed as the Agriculture minister in Afghanistan's transitional government.

During his tenure his personal interest was in the cultivation of roses. As Minister he worked to develop agribusiness in the forestry, stone fruit and pomegranate sector. The established business of grapes and certain vegetables were afforded support from assorted NGOs. He encouraged and supported the establishment by an American company, Permanente Corporation of California, of the creation of three major tree farms and nurseries in the Kabul area that grew millions of root stock trees for stone fruit, fruiting pomegranate orchard trees and millions of Pinus Alderica (Afghan Pine) seedlings for eventual transplanting into the mountains denuded by prior years of war and over cutting. With his endorsement of the activities of Permanente Corporation, Afghan Development Company was founded to carry on the work of the private sector under his Ministerial administration.

The participants in the Permanente led consortium included Sunsweet Growers, Burchell Nurseries, Seminis Seeds, Netafim Irrigation, Langer's Juice, UC Davis agriculture extension, and professors at Cornell University offices for scientific work related to cultivation of Afghan native species and the reintroduction of plant materials held for over 70 years in Davis, California and the protection of plant materials by the establishment of laws and regulations relating to import and export of agribusiness products. Anwari tried, but did not get any meaningful Transitional Government financial support for his ministerial agribusiness activities. The multitudes of NGOs and global international government organizations including USAID and the USA Commerce Department and Agriculture Departments failed to fully support his initiatives.

Deferring instead to OMB rules that prohibited funding mechanisms for countries in war zones, many USDA, CCC, ExImBank programs became unavailable to Afghanistan businesses despite Anwari's efforts from Afghanistan, and Permanente's efforts from the US, to achieve the contrary. Of the millions of dollars of US government economic aid spent ostensibly in Afghanistan on agriculture development most funds had little impact on the Afghan agricultural economy and remained inside the Washington DC beltway spent in the form of reports and studies.

No real development programs on the ground in Afghanistan were instituted. Anwari provided trees for Afghan Tree Week (a May Day ceremonial occasion) by encouraging Permanente to donate seedlings for planting in nurseries and tree farms around the countryside.

Afghanistan was not permitted to draw on any portion of the nearly $50 million in funds earmarked for agribusiness development by the Asian Development Bank who instead stood on the sidelines and held back funds for agriculture development despite Anwari's efforts to gain financial support and push for broader economic development in the agriculture sector. In fact, Anwari's budget was so thin that he paid by himself for the installation of sanitary facilities in Ministerial offices.

=== Governorship and Parliament ===
In June 2005 he was appointed governor of Herat province where he served until 2009. He was elected to the Wolesi Jirga as a member from Kabul in the 2010 elections. He had previously been elected as an MP from Kabul in the 2005 elections.

Preceded by Sayed Muhammad Khairkhwa	Governor of Herat Province; 2005-2009	Succeeded by Ahmad Yussef Nuristani
