= Nematullah Shahrani =

Afghani scholar (born 1941)

- نعمت الله شهرانی
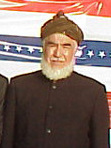
- Shahrani in 2002

3rd Vice President of Afghanistan
- In office 19 June 2002 – 7 December 2004
- President: Hamid Karzai

Nematullah Shahrani (born 1941) is a prominent Afghan scholar. He was one of four Vice Presidents of the Afghan Transitional Administration from 2002 to 2004. Shahrani also headed of the Afghan Constitution Commission.

He has written more than 30 books and several hundred academic articles. He belongs to an academic family that is known in Afghanistan as the family of scholars. He studied at Kabul University, Al-Azhar University (Cairo) and The George Washington University (U.S.).

From Badakhshan Province in northern Afghanistan, Shahrani was one of the ideological figures behind the Afghan resistance against the Soviet invasion of Afghanistan. He was never involved in any sectarian, party, or other ethnic conflicts in Afghanistan. For that, he earned the nickname of Mr. Clean.

Currently some of his family members teach at academic institutions in the United States (such as Indiana University Bloomington) and the United Kingdom.
