= Ahmad Yusuf Nuristani =

Afghan politician

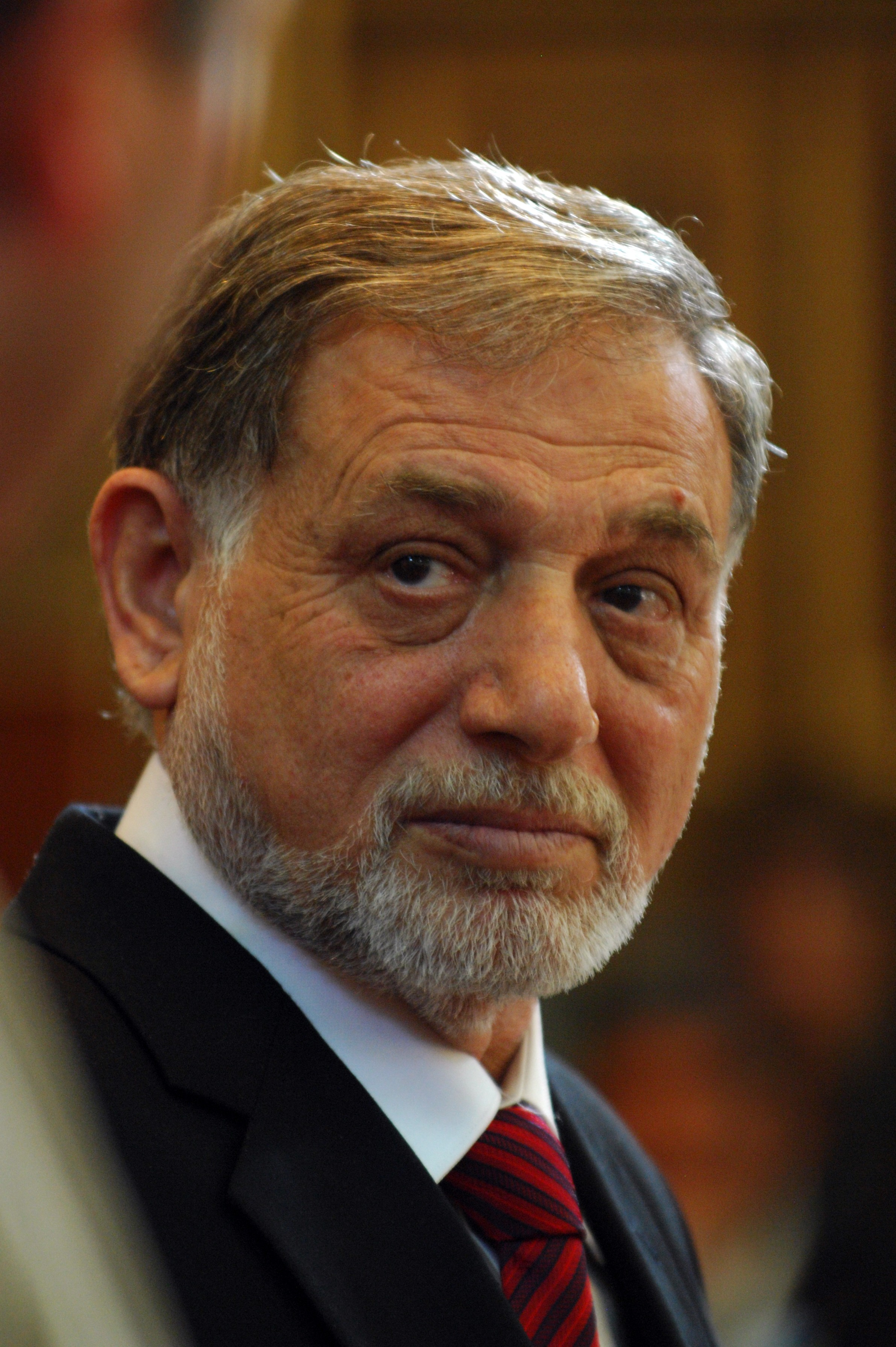
- Dr. Ahmad Yusef Nuristani in December 2009

Governor of Herat Province, Afghanistan
- In office 18 January 2009 – 24 August 2010
- Preceded by: Sayed Hussein Anwari
- Succeeded by: Daud Shah Saba

Personal details
- Born: 1947 (age 78–79) Neshagram, Want District, Nuristan Province, Kingdom of Afghanistan
- Profession: Politician

Dr. Ahmad Yusuf Nuristani is a former politician from Afghanistan. He served as governor of Herat province from January 2009 to August 2010. In September 2018, President Ashraf Ghani appointed Nuristani to the Meshrano Jirga, the upper body of parliament in Afghanistan. From 2005 to 2008 he was the 1st Deputy Defense Minister, Government of Afghanistan. He was recently convicted in the United States and in Afghanistan.

== Early life and experiences ==
Nuristani was born on May 8, 1947, or 18 Sawr 1326 according to the Afghan Solar Hijri calendar, in Neshagram, located in the Want District of Nuristan Province in eastern Afghanistan. His father’s name was Ahmad Khan.

From 1992 to 1996 Nuristani has worked as a Project Coordinator, Basic Education for Afghan Refugees, GTZ/UNHCR- sponsored project, in Peshawar, Pakistan. As a project coordinator, Nuristani managed programs aimed at serving educational needs of Afghan refugees in Khyber Pakhtunkhwa. He also provided guidance and coordination between GTZ and collaborating organizations (e.g. Ministry of Education, UNHCR, UNICEF, EU Commission for Afghan Refugees) in terms implementing formal and informal educational projects; forged relations with various religious and political organizations interested in working in the educational field of Afghan children who also promoted curriculums based on own ideologies and political thoughts; served as chairman of ACBAR educational committee, and in this capacity created curriculum standards that adequately served educational and cultural needs of children.

From 1988 to 1990 Nuristani worked as a Senior Cultural Specialist, United States Information Service (USIS)-Afghan Program, in Peshawar, Pakistan. In this position, Nuristani administered US international visitors exchange program (I.V.) by sending prospective political leaders to the US in order to acquire leadership and democratic skills; facilitated Fulbright, Hubert Humphrey, and North and South Fellowship and other fellowship and scholarship exchange programs; worked closely with Afghan resistance leaders and parties in Pakistan in order to promote good working relations and understanding between Afghan resistance parties and the US foreign mission in Pakistan; established the monthly 8-page journal, called Itlaat, in order to disseminate information on US foreign policies and other relevant issues in the region.

From 1975 to 1978, Nuristani worked as a Graduate Research and Teaching Assistant in the Department of Anthropology, University of Arizona in the United States. He also worked as an assistant professor in the Department of Social Sciences and Humanities at Kabul University in Afghanistan. He has been actively involved in Afghan politics for the last 30 years and has participated in major conferences related to Afghan issues. He was one of the founding members of the Writer's Union of Free Afghanistan (WUFA) as well as the Afghan Professor's University Association (APUA) during the Soviet occupation of Afghanistan while residing in Peshawar. He received his Ph.D. in Near Eastern Studies from the University of Arizona located in Tucson, Arizona.

Nuristani was a central figure in the 2014 election crisis of Afghanistan, as the chairman of the election commission his deputies were accused of ballot stuffing in favor of president Ashraf Ghani. Nuristani has been a controversial figure in the election process of Afghanistan and, despite Afghan public opinion being against him, he insisted on staying as chairman of the election commission. On March 26, 2016, in a surprise move Nuristani resigned from his post as the chairman of election commission. He recently became a member of Afghanistan's Meshrano Jirga (Parliament).

=== Criminal conviction ===
On December 11, 2019, Nuristani pleaded guilty in a United States federal court in Southern California to theft and fraud related charges. As a part of his plea agreement, Nuristani has agreed to make full restitution to the Social Security Administration and the California Department of Health Care Services. He faced up to 10 years in federal prison and a fine of up to $250,000. He was sentenced to six months of home confinement. On March 8, 2021, a court in Afghanistan found Nuristani guilty of misusing his authority during his past employment for the Afghan government.

Preceded by Sayed Hussein Anwari	Governor of Herat Province, Afghanistan; January 18, 2009-August 24, 2010	Succeeded by Daud Shah Saba
