= Mohammad Ebrahim Khedri =

Afghan wrestler (1938–2022)

Muhammad Ibrahim Khedri
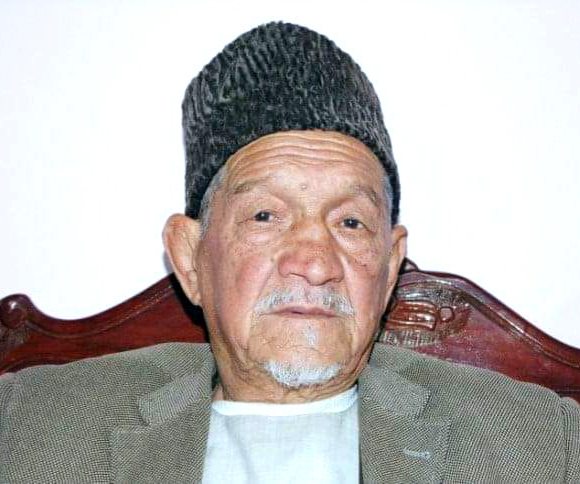

Personal information
- Native name: محمد ابراهیم خدری
- Born: 11 April 1938 Kabul, Kingdom of Afghanistan
- Died: 22 May 2022 (aged 84) Turkman Valley, Surkhi Parsa, Parwan, Afghanistan

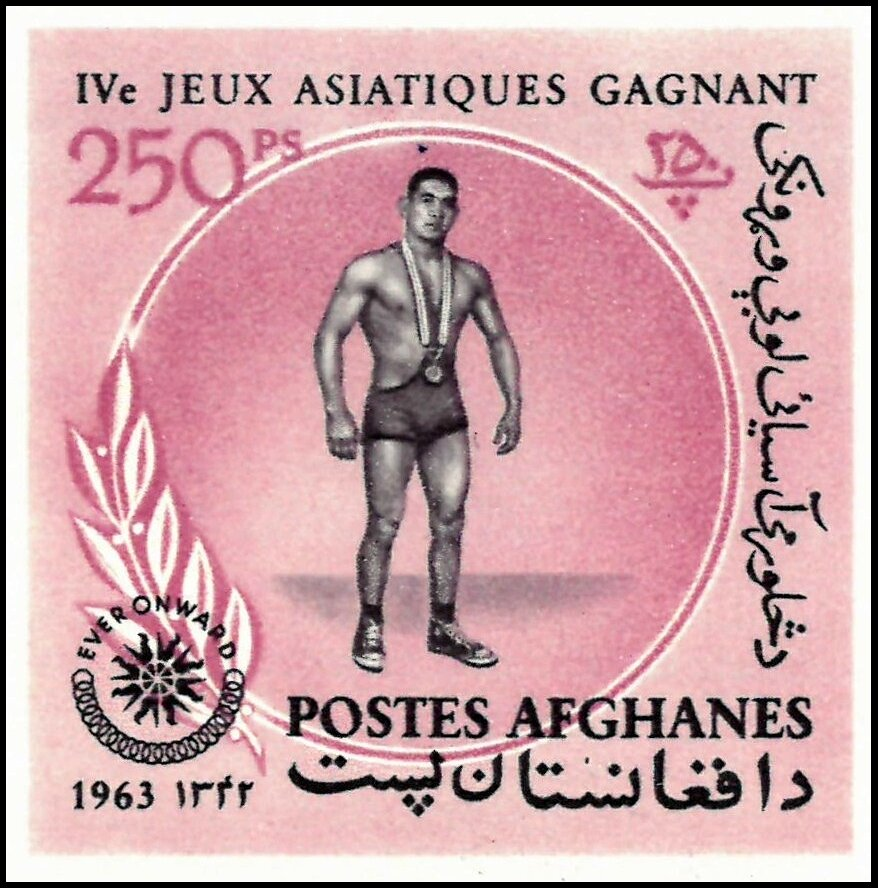
1963 post stamp of Afghanistan depicting Pahlawan Ibrahim

Muhammad Ibrahim Khedri (Dari: محمد ابراهیم خدری) known as Pahlawan Ibrahim (پهلوان ابراهیم); (11 April 1938 – 22 May 2022) was an Afghan wrestler from Hazara ethnicity who competed in the 1960, 1964, 1968, and 1972 Summer Olympics in the featherweight events.

== Early life ==
Khedri was born on 11 April 1938 into a peasant family of Hazara ethnic group, in the Turkman Valley of Surkhi Parsa District in Parwan province. He moved with his family to Kabul as a child.

== Death ==
Ibrahim Khedri died on 22 May 2022, aged 84, in Kabul.

== See also ==
- List of Hazara people
- Wakil Hussain Allahdad
