= Noor Mohammad Islamjar =

Governor of Herat

Shaykh al-Hadith Noor Muhammad Islamjar
- شیخ الحدیث نورمحمد اسلامجار (Pashto)
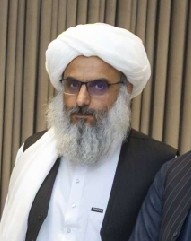
- Islamjar in 2026

Governor of Herat
- Incumbent
- Assumed office 26 October 2021
- Prime Minister: Hasan Akhund
- Supreme Leader: Hibatullah Akhundzada
- Preceded by: Abdul Qayyum Rohani

Shaykh al-Hadith Noor Muhammad Islamjar (Pashto: شیخ الحدیث نورمحمد اسلامجار) is an Afghan Taliban politician who is currently serving as governor of Herat Province since 26 October 2021.
