= Sayed Mustafa Kazemi =

Afghan politician (1959–2007)

Sayed Mustafa Kazemi سید مصطفیٰ کاظمی
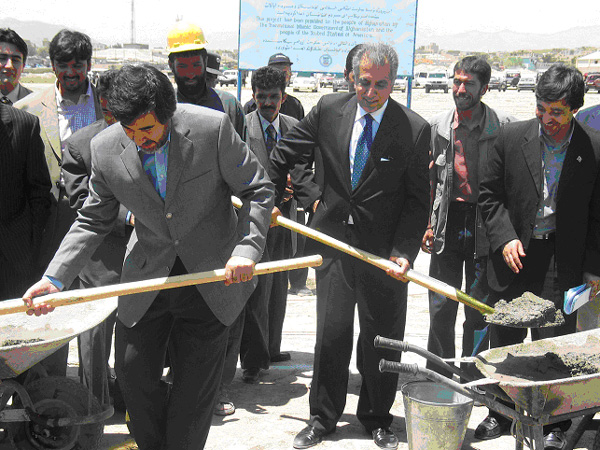
- Kazemi (left) with Zalmay Khalilzad (right) in 2004

Personal details
- Born: Sayed Mustafa; 1959 Surkhi Parsa District, Parwan Province, Kingdom of Afghanistan
- Died: November 6, 2007 (aged 47–48) Puli Khumri, Baghlan Province, Islamic Republic of Afghanistan
- Occupation: Politician

Sayed Mustafa Kazemi (Dari: سید مصطفیٰ کاظمی, 1959 – November 6, 2007) was an Afghan politician. He was born in the Surkhi Parsa District of Parwan Province and later studied business for three years in the University of Isfahan in neighboring Iran. In late 2001 he joined the Afghan Interim Administration and became the Minister of Commerce and Industry. He was also one of the leaders and the spokesman for the opposition movement known as the United National Front.

== Death ==
On November 6, 2007, Kazemi was amongst a delegation of politicians and lawmakers attending a ceremony to reopen a sugar factory in the city of Puli Khumri when he was killed in a suicide bomb attack.

== See also ==
- Ministry of Commerce and Industry (Afghanistan)
