= Campaign against Sultan Masudi Hazaras =

16th century campaign

Date	1505
Location	Maidan Wardak, Hazarajat, Afghanistan
Result	Timurid victory

Belligerents
Timurids of Kabul	Sultan Masudi Hazaras

Commanders and leaders
Zahir-ud-din Muhammad Babur	Unknown

The Campaign against Sultan Masudi Hazaras was a campaign of the Mughal Emperor, Babur in the early 16th century against Hazaras.

After the conquest of Kabul, Babur had imposed a large contribution of horses and sheep on the Sultan Masudi Hazaras and sent collectors to receive it. However, his collectors returned unsuccessful. The Hazaras refused to pay as they did not recognize Babur as their legitimate sovereign. Several times before they had been guilty of depredations on the roads of Ghazni and Gardez. Babur decided to subdue the Hazaras in what is now Maidan Wardak Province of Afghanistan.

Babur took the field for the purpose of falling on them by surprise and having advanced by way of Maidan Shar he cleared the pass of Nirkh District by night and by the time of Fajr prayers, fell upon the Hazaras in the territory of Chatu and defeated them. He then levied the taxes on them and returned by way of Sang Surakh. Jahangir Mirza II took leave to go to Ghazni while Babur returned to Kabul.

== See also ==
- First Campaign against Turkoman Hazaras
