= List of governors of Herat =

This is a list of the governors of the province of Herat, Afghanistan.

== Governors of Herat Province ==
Governor	Period	Extra	Note
Mohammad Zaman Khan	1716; 1721		Father of Ahmad Shah Durrani, the founding father of Afghanistan
Mohammad Yaqub Khan	1863; 1874		Son of Emir Sher Ali Khan
Mohammad Ayub Khan	February 1879; September 1881		Son of Emir Sher Ali Khan, brother of Mohammad Yaqub Khan
Nazir Muhammad Sarwar Khan	1882; 1886		Loyalist to Abdur Rahman Khan
Kazi Saad-ud-Din Khan	1887; 1914		Supporter of the ruling dynasty and the father of one of Amir Habibullah Khan's wives.
Muhammad Sulaiman Khan	1915; 1919		Former Military Secretary to King Habibullah Khan 1914–1915
Abdur Rahim Khan	September 1931 September 1934		
Ismail Khan	1992; 1997		Mujahideen commander and warlord during the civil war in Afghanistan
Mulla Yaar Mohammad	1997; 2001		Taliban
Ismail Khan	2001; 12 September 2004		Appointed as Minist of Water and Energy
Sayed Mohammad Khairkhah	September 2004; June 2005		Former Afghan Ambassador to Iran and Ukraine
Sayed Hussein Anwari	June 2005; 23 January 2009		Former Minister of Agriculture in the Transitional Administration
Ahmad Yussef Nuristani	18 January 2009; 24 August 2010		Resigned to run as Wolesi Jirga MP in the 2010 elections
Daud Shah Saba	3 September 2010; 27 June 2013		Former Human Development Advisor to the President of Afghanistan, 2005–2008,
Fazlullah Wahidi	3 July 2013 ??		Former Governor of eastern Kunar Province, November 2007-July 2013,
Mohammad Asif Rahimi	27 April 2015 11 Dec 2018		Former Afghan Minister of Agriculture
Abdul Quayom Rahimi	23 January 2013; 3 April 2020	Former head of the Office of Public Support of the Office of Local Authorities and brother of Abdul Salam Rahimi is the current head of the office of Ashraf Ghani, President of Afghanistan	
Sayed Abdul Wahid Qatali	3 April 2020; 14 June 2021		
Abdul Sabur Qane	15 June 2021; 13 August 2021		
Abdul Qayyum Rohani	Sep 2021; 26 October 2021		under Islamic Emirate of Afghanistan
Noor Mohammad Islamjar	26 October 2021; Present		under Islamic Emirate of Afghanistan

== See also ==
- List of current governors of Afghanistan
