= Turkman Valley =

Turkman Valley دره ترکمون
- Valley
- Location within Afghanistan
- Coordinates: 34.896°N 68.652°E
- Country: Afghanistan
- Province: Parwan
- District: Surkhi Parsa

Population
  - Ethnicities: Hazara people
  - Religions: Islam
- Time zone: + 4.30

Turkman Valley or Dare-e Turkman (Persian: دره ترکمن; Hazaragi: دره ترکمون) is a valley in Afghanistan, located in Surkhi Parsa District, Parwan Province in Hazaristan region, which is inhabited by the Hazaras.

== Demographics ==
The Turkman valley is populated by Hazaras. They speak the Hazaragi dialect of Persian.

== Notable people ==
- Commander Shafi Hazara
- Wakil Hussain Allahdad
- Mohaqiq Kabuli
- Mohammad Ebrahim Khedri
- Abbas Noyan

== See also ==
- Valleys of Afghanistan
