= Mohaqiq Kabuli =

Afghan Grand Ayatollah (1928-2019)

Grand Ayatollah Mohaqiq Kabuli
- محقق كابلى
- Grand Ayatollah Mohaqiq Kabuli

Personal life
- Born: May 29, 1928 CE Turkman Valley, Parwan, Kingdom of Afghanistan
- Died: June 11, 2019 (aged 91)
- Resting place: Fatima Masumeh Shrine, Qom
- Other name: Persian: آيت‌الله العظمى محقق كابلى
- Occupation: Marja'
- Website: www.mohaqeq.org

Religious life
- Religion: Shia Islam
- Sect: Twelver

Senior posting
- Based in: Kabul, Afghanistan

Grand Ayatullah Qorban Ali Mohaqiq Kabuli (Dari: آیت‌الله العظمى قربان على محقق كابلى) was a Twelver Shia Marja' in Afghanistan. He was an ethnic Hazara.

== Biography ==
=== Early life ===
He was born in the Turkman Valley in Parwan, north-west of Kabul.

=== Education and career ===
He started basic religious schooling at the age of seven, by learning the Quran and religion related books in the Persian language. He got deeply involved in Islamic beliefs, literature, logic, jurisprudence and sciences after he joined local religious schools. Later, he went to Kabul where educational resources were limited and the political situation was not ideal. Then for further studies, he left Afghanistan for Iran.

In 1332 SH, he went to study in Najaf, Iraq. His teachers there were Ayatollah Abdul Ali Sabzevri, Sheikh Kazim Tabrezi, Sayed Abdul Hussein Rashti, Mohammad Taqi Al-Razi, Sheikh Sadra, and Sheikh Mujtaba Talmaz. He also attended lectures of Imam Khomeini. In 1334 SH his teachers were Ayatollah Khoei and Ayatollah Sheikh Mohammad Baqir Zanjani.

After completing his education he returned to Afghanistan in 1973, where he was welcomed by thousands of people on his arrival. He was also a prominent member of the Ahl al-Bayt World Assembly.

== Political activities ==
After the 1978 coup in Afghanistan, Mohqiq Kabuli left Afghanistan and went first to Pakistan and then to Iran. In Pakistan, he established an organization named the "Organization for the Defense of the Islamic Realm" (Sazman-e Defa az Harim-e Eslami) with a group of Afghan refugees. In Iran, he united Afghan Shiite groups and helped establish the "Unity Party of the Islamic Revolution." He also worked for a time with the "Liberation Front for the Islamic Revolution of Afghanistan." He also helped establish the "Council of Alliance of the Islamic Revolution of Afghanistan." Later, he supported the "Hezb-e Wahdat-e Islami Afghanistan" and in 1992, he became secretary of the party's Supreme Supervisory Council. In 1992, after the fall of the Marxist government, he returned to Kabul. He stayed in Kabul during the war and supported the Shiites of Afghanistan.

== works ==
He wrote many books on religious studies, in three fields: jurisprudence and its principles, ethics and education, and religious duties. His works on jurisprudence include Mabahith al-Fiqhiyyah, al-Khums, Tahrir al-Urwah, and Wazifat al-Qudat. Minhaj al-Salihin and Manasik al-Hajj, a book explaining the rules of Hajj, are among his other works.

== Death ==
He died on 11 June 2019, at the age of 91.
