= Sayed Mohammad Ali Jawid =

Afghan politician

Sayed Mohammad Ali Jawid سید محمدعلی جاوید
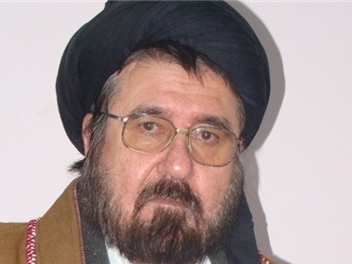

Leader of Islamic Movement of Afghanistan
- Incumbent
- Assumed office 2005

Personal details
- Born: Sayed Mohammad Ali; 1951 (age 74–75) Balkh province, Kingdom of Afghanistan
- Party: Islamic Movement of Afghanistan

Sayed Mohammad Ali Jawid (Dari: سید محمدعلی جاوید; born c.1951) is a politician and the leader of Islamic Movement of Afghanistan. He was born in Polebaraq, Balkh province, in the Islamic calendar year 1330 (1951–1952 AD) to a Persian speaking family. He completed his preliminary education in Afghanistan and moved to Najaf, Iraq for higher education, where he completed his Ph.D. in religious studies. In addition to Persian, he speaks fluent Arabic. During the communist regime, he founded the Islamic Movement of Afghanistan under the leadership of Sheikh Muhammad Asif Muhsini. He worked against the Soviet invasion of Afghanistan. After the victory of the Mujahideen he served in the following roles under President Burhanuddin Rabbani:

- Minister of Planning and Management
- Minister of Transportation
- Acting Prime Minister

After the fall of the Taliban government in 2001, he served in the following roles under President Hamid Karzai:

- Minister of Transportation
- Spokesman of National Communication Front

He is now the leader of the Islamic Movement of Afghanistan. He lives in Kabul, Afghanistan.
