= Hamidullah Farooqi =

Afghan politician, economist and activist

Hamidullah Farooqi (born 1954 in Herat, Afghanistan) is an Afghan politician, economist and activist. He has written several research papers and served in higher positions within the Islamic Republic of Afghanistan's government. Farooqi served as the Chancellor of Kabul University from 2016 to 2021 until the fall of Kabul in the hands of Taliban. He also served as Advisor Minister to President Mohammad Ashraf Ghani on Higher Education. He previously served as Minister of Transport and Civil Aviation from March 2009 to January 2010 in the cabinet of former President Hamid Karzai.

== Early life ==
Farooqi earned his Baccalaureate in General Science from Habibia High School, Kabul, Afghanistan in 1972. In 1976, he completed an undergraduate degree from Kabul University in Economics in Trade and Commerce Development. He completed his master's degree M.A. in General Economics and Business Administration at Queens College in New York in 1995. His Master's thesis was "North American Free Trade Agreement". Farooqi received a Certificate on Foreign Trade (UN Fellowship) from the International Institute of Foreign Trade in New Delhi, India in 1982.

== Career ==
=== Minister of Transport and Civil Aviation ===
Farooqi was appointed as Minister of Transport and Civil Aviation of the Islamic Republic of Afghanistan in March 2009 to January 2010. During his tenure, he worked on strategic planning for the ministry in order to put ministry resources on a professional track for restructuring and reforming the country's transport infrastructure, shaping and improving the capacity of the ministry. Farooqi completed a process of determining strategic goals and objectives in terms of delivery to the public. He improved bureaucracy and management as well as modernizing the transportation system. He participated in major conferences such as Afghanistan, the Link between the Middle East, South, and Central Asia (2010); South Asia-China Economy and Trade Cooperation, Confucius University of Kathmandu (2010); and SPECA conference, Baku – Azerbaijan, (2010).

=== Chancellor of Kabul University ===
Farooqi joined Kabul University faculty as a lecturer in Economics in July 2003. Later, he was promoted to a professorship and started reforming Kabul University's system. He participated on behalf of Kabul University in South Asia - China cultures and Economic Forum in Kathmandu – Nepal (2010).

=== Advisor Minister ===
Farooqi was designated an Advisor Minister to the President Mohammad Ashraf Ghani. Currently, he serves as Advisor Minister to the President of Afghanistan in Higher Education. His focus is on improving quality and modernizing Afghanistan in general and higher education in order to make it productive and responsive to the needs of the people and the institutions of Afghanistan. He also continues to make inroads in the international community.

=== Oversight Committee Chair ===
Farooqi was appointed Chairman, Oversight Committee for MoD Logistics Contracts in February 2015.

=== Other Positions ===
- President of Hashmat Leading Company Limited, Afghanistan in 1979
- Founder and elected Member of Board of Directors, Afghanistan Traders & Industrialists Center (MATSA) (ATIC) from 2002 to 2003
- President and CEO, Hamed - Lais construction Company L.L.C., Kabul – Afghanistan, 2003–2005
- Chairman of the Board of Directors, Bank-e-Millie Afghan Kabul, Afghanistan, Apr 2004–2009
- Professor and Lecturer, Faculty of Economics, Kabul University, Kabul, Afghanistan, July 2003 – Present
- Chairman, International Model School (IMS) now (Beacon House High School, the first Private School in Afghanistan, July 2005- July 2010)
- CEO, Afghanistan International Chamber of Commerce (AICC), Sep 2005–2008
- Founder and Member of Board of Directors, Aid and Correlation Center for Professors and Lecturers, 2005 – Present
- Leading the Afghanistan delegate to Turkey, Business Cooperation Center Istanbul, Turkey, 2006
- Chairman (Elected) & Co-Founder, Brishna Think Tank, 2007–2009
- Co-founder, Mesbah Institute (Private Higher Education Institute), 2008–Present
- Chairman, Committee for Comprehensive Evaluation of Herat Province State of Affairs By the President of Afghanistan, December 2014
- Central Region Campaign Manager, Spokesperson of the Electoral Team, Dr. Ashraf Ghani Presidential Electoral Campaign, February 2014 – September 2014
- Right and Justice Party, Co-founder, elected member of Leadership council of the party, and spokesman, October 2011 – Present
- Logar Province Public General Council, Co-Founder and Elected Chairman, Logar Province Public General Council, March 2010 – Present
- Chancellor and Chief Advisor, Chancellor of Kabul University and Chief Advisor to the President of I.R.A on Higher Education, July 2016 – Present

== Publications ==
He published papers on several topics for Kabul University, including:

- Corruption and its Impacts on Economic Growth of Afghanistan (Ongoing); Regional Economic Integration, Quarterly Journal of Economics, 7th Volume, 2016;
- An Overview of Globalization and Its Correlation with Economic Development of Afghanistan, Quarterly Journal of Economics, 5th Volume, 2016;
- The History of Economic School of Thoughts, 2015; International Economics, 2014;
- Corruption and its effects on Economic Development, Afghanistan Academy of Sciences, Kabul – Afghanistan, 2012.
