= Islamic Movement of Afghanistan =

Shia political party in Afghanistan

Islamic Movement of Afghanistan حرکت اسلامی افغانستان
- Leader: Sayed Mohammad Ali Jawid
- Founder: Asif Mohseni
- Founded: 1978
- Ideology: Islamism; Shariatism (Initially)
- National affiliation: Tehran Eight (1987-1989); National Coalition of Afghanistan (2010-2021)

Website
- islamicharakatparty.com

Islamic Movement of Afghanistan
- Leaders: Asif Mohseni; Sayed Mohammad Ali Jawid
- Dates active: 1978-2001
- Ideology: Shia Islamism
- Part of: Tehran Eight; Northern Alliance
- Wars: the Soviet–Afghan War

Islamic Movement of Afghanistan (Dari: حرکت اسلامی افغانستان, Harakat-e Islami-yi Afghanistan) is a political party and former faction of the Afghan Northern Alliance (United Front) in Afghanistan. The movement is registered as a political party with the Ministry of Justice. From its foundation to 2005, the movement was led by Asif Mohseni. The movement emerged in 1978. Initially the movement was inspired by the Islamic revolutionary ideas of Ali Shari'ati, but over time this influence waned.

During the 1980s, the movement was part of the 'Tehran Eight', an alliance of Shia mujahedin factions supported by Iran that fought against the PDPA government and Soviet troops. The movement joined the Hezb-e Wahdat, which was intended as a united Shia political front, but soon bolted out of it. During the Taliban years, it joined the 'Northern Alliance'.

After the US occupation of Afghanistan, the movement was divided into two. A dissident sector broke away, and formed the People's Islamic Movement of Afghanistan. The dissidents, led by Hussain Anwari, were based among the militia forces of the movement and had a more secular political outlook.

In the aftermath of the U.S.-led invasion of Afghanistan in 2001, Harakat-e Islami-yi Afghanistan was designated a terrorist organization by the U.S. government for its ties to Al-Qaeda and the Taliban.

In February 2005, Muhsini resigned as leader of the movement. Muhammad Ali Jawid, who has served in Hamid Karzai's first cabinet in 2001, became the new leader of the movement.

In April 2005, the movement joined the National Understanding Front of Afghanistan, a 12-member front of opposition parties. However, the front soon became inactive.

== See also ==
- List of Islamic political parties
