= Sheikh Ali (Hazara tribe) =

Hazara tribe of Afghanistan

The Sheikh Ali (Dari: شیخ‌علی) are a major tribe of Hazaras. Inhabiting in Afghanistan mainly in Parwan (mostly in Sheikh Ali District), Kunduz, Baghlan, and Bamyan provinces and in other parts of the country.

== History ==
In the late 19th century, Ishaq Khan rebelled against Afghan Amir Abdur Rahman at Mazar-e Sharif. Abdur Rahman sent a force against Ishaq Khan, passing through the Sheikh Ali territory. During their passage, the force faced many skirmishes with the local Sheikh Ali over the scarce food and fodder. Once Abdur Rahman quashed the rebellion of Ishaq, he then focused on Sheikh Ali Hazaras. The Sheikh Ali also resisted.

== See also ==
- List of Hazara tribes
- Shekh Ali District
