= Surkhi Parsa District =

Surkhi Parsa سرخ پارسا
- District
- Location within Afghanistan
- Coordinates: 34°54′N 68°42′E
- Country: Afghanistan
- Provinces of Afghanistan: Parwan
- Capital: Lulinj

Area
  - Total: 1,164 km^{2} (449 sq mi)

Population (2003 Est.)
  - Total: 39,700
  - Languages: Persian (Hazaragi dialect)
- Time zone: UTC+4:30 (Afghanistan Standard Time)
- Area code: (+93) 49/48/47

Surkh-o- Parsa sometimes spelt as Surkhi Parsa or shurkhi parsha (Dari: سرخ پارسا) is a district in Parwan province, Afghanistan. The center of the district is called Lulinj and is a green valley around a river.

== Demographics ==
Surkhi Parsa District has a mixed population. According to the European Asylum Support Office (EASO) 2016 report, Tajiks live predominantly in Sorkh-e Parsa district of Parwan Province alongside other ethnic communities.

== Geography ==
The district is composed of several separate valleys called Surkh Valley, Parsa Valley, Turkman Valley, Gandaab Valley, Paawaaz Valley as well as Lolenge and Do-aab. In Lolenge, there is a historical shrine for pilgrimage known as the “Shah Daleer” or “The Brave King". There is a large historical fort, locally known as “The Castle of Sayid Sarwar Khan". There are two big rivers joining in Lolenge near Tangi Azhdahaar. One of the rivers flows from the Turkman valley of, the other one from the Surkh Valley in the center of the district. The river continues its journey through Lolenge, dividing it into two separate parts and joining another river at the end of Lolenge Valley in Do-Aab. This river which flows from Shekh Ali District moving towards Chardeh and Siaah Gerd district.

== See also ==
- Districts of Afghanistan
- Turkman Valley
