= Wakil Hussain Allahdad =

Afghan wrestler

Wakil Hussain Allahdad وکیل حسین الله‌داد
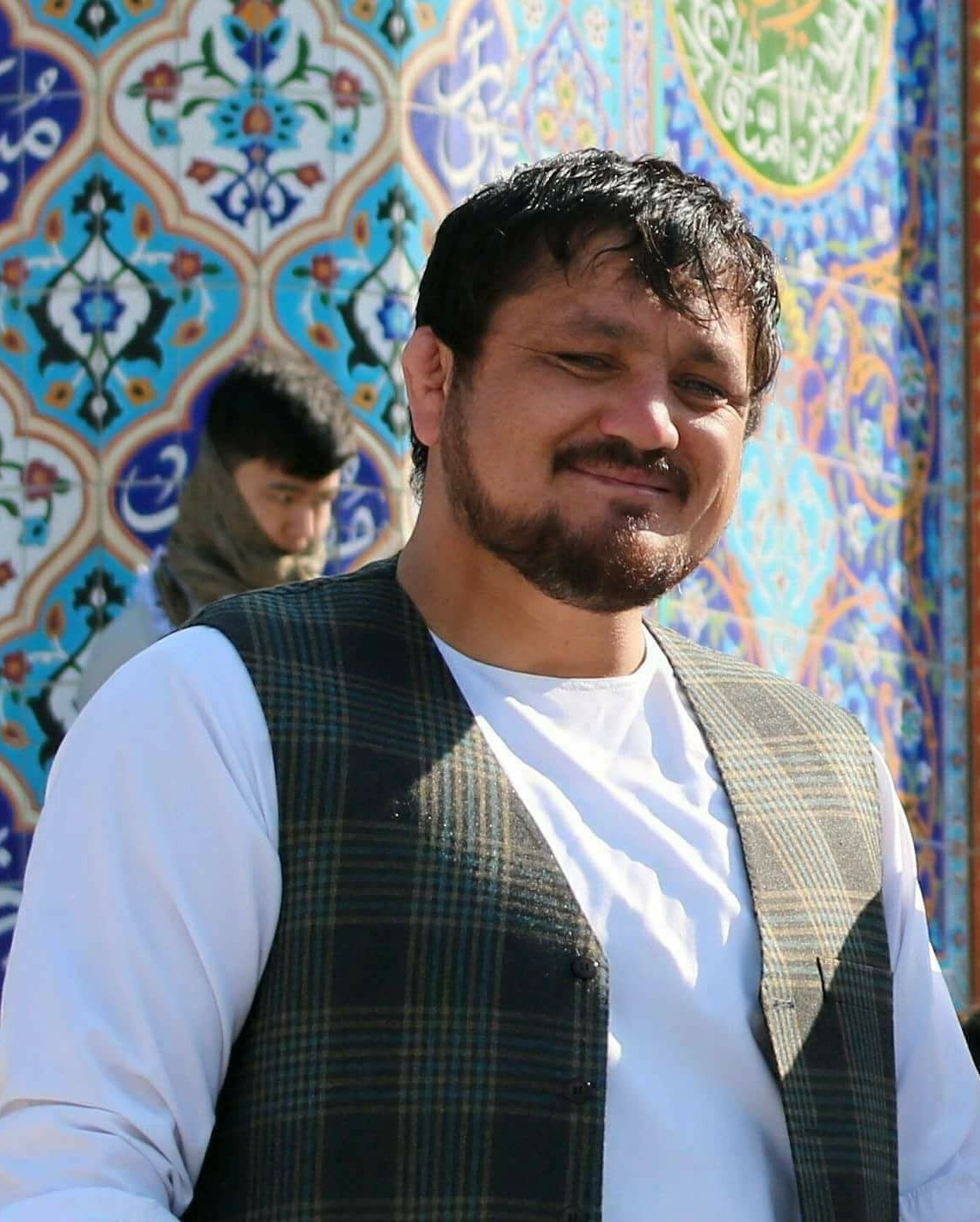
- Born: Hussain; 1986; Democratic Republic of Afghanistan
- Died: April 22, 2018 (aged 31–32); Dashte Barchi, Kabul, Islamic Republic of Afghanistan
- Cause of death: 22 April 2018 Kabul suicide bombing
- Other names: Pahlawan Wakil پهلوان وکیل
- Known for: Community first responder
- Spouse: Married
- Children: 4

Wakil Hussain Allahdad (Dari: وکیل حسین الله‌داد); (1986-2018) was an ethnic Hazara wrestler, community first responder and an entrepreneur from Afghanistan.

== History ==
Wakil Hussain Allahdad was born in 1986 in Afghanistan in a family who were members of the Hazara ethnic group. He started wrestling in 1998 at age 12. He was taught by Sher Jan Ahmadi, deputy head of the country's wrestling federation. His weight class was 214 pounds and he won many medals in domestic tournaments, as well as a silver medal at an international tournament in Pakistan. He retired from wrestling in 2014 after tearing a muscle in his leg and began coaching at a local wrestling club, teaching 150 students daily.

During the 11 October 2016 attack on the Karte Sakhi Shrine, he was one of the rescuers and was photographed carrying a wounded girl in an Agence France-Presse image that was widely circulated. He was also a rescuer in the June 2017 Kabul mosque attack.

He was also an entrepreneur who ran multiple small businesses including a crockery shop, travel agency and photography shop.

He was killed in the 22 April 2018 Kabul suicide bombing in the Dashte Barchi area of Kabul, which occurred across the street from his photography shop. He was taken to Isteqlal hospital before being transferred to a trauma facility run by the Italian NGO Emergency where he died.

== Personal life ==
Allahdad was married and had four children, including two sons and two girls.

== See also ==
- 22 April 2018 Kabul suicide bombing
- List of Hazara people
- Mohammad Ebrahim Khedri
