= Haneef Atmar =

Afghan politician

Mohammad Haneef Atmar
- محمد حنیف اتمر
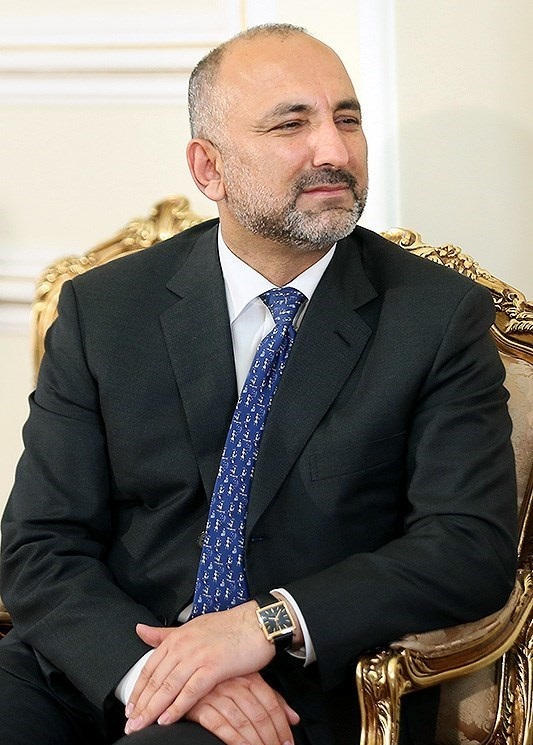
- Atmar in meeting with Ali Shamkhani in Tehran, August 2016

Minister of Foreign Affairs
- In office 4 April 2020 – 15 August 2021; Acting: 4 April 2020 – 4 February 2021
- President: Ashraf Ghani
- Preceded by: Mohammad Haroon Chakhansuri (acting)
- Succeeded by: Amir Khan Muttaqi

National Security Adviser of Afghanistan
- In office 1 November 2014 – 25 August 2018
- President: Ashraf Ghani
- Preceded by: Shaida Mohammad Abdali
- Succeeded by: Hamdullah Mohib

Minister of Interior
- In office 11 October 2008 – 6 June 2010
- President: Hamid Karzai
- Preceded by: Ahmad Moqbel Zarar
- Succeeded by: Bismillah Khan Mohammadi

Minister of Education
- In office 2 May 2006 – 1 October 2008
- President: Hamid Karzai
- Preceded by: Noor Mohammad Qarqin
- Succeeded by: Ghulam Farooq Wardak

Minister of Rural Rehabilitation and Development
- In office 2002–2008
- Succeeded by: Mohammad Ehsan Zia

Personal details
- Born: 10 September 1968 (age 57) Laghman, Kingdom of Afghanistan
- Citizenship: Afghanistan
- Party: PDPA (until 1992); Truth and Justice (since 2011)
- Education: University of York

Military service
- Allegiance: Islamic Republic of Afghanistan
- Branch/service: KhAD
- Battles/wars: Soviet-Afghan War; Afghan Civil War (1989–1992); Battle of Jalalabad (WIA); War in Afghanistan (2001–2021)

Mohammad Haneef Atmar (Dari: محمد حنیف اتمر; born 10 September 1968) is an Afghan politician and diplomat. He served as Minister of Foreign Affairs of Afghanistan, and earlier held cabinet positions as Minister of Rural Rehabilitation and Development (2002–2006), Minister of Education (2006–2008), and Minister of Interior (2008–2010). He was also the National Security Advisor to President Ashraf Ghani from 2014 to 2018.

Atmar first worked with international humanitarian organisations before entering government. He was appointed by President Hamid Karzai as Minister of Rural Rehabilitation and Development in 2002, serving in that role until 2006. He then became Minister of Education, a position he held from 2006 to 2008. In 2008, he was appointed Minister of Interior, where he served until June 2010. In 2011, he founded the Truth and Justice Party, which he went on to lead. Throughout his ministerial career, he engaged with international partners to secure support for Afghanistan's stability and reconstruction.

In 2014, Atmar was appointed National Security Advisor to President Ashraf Ghani, a position he held until his resignation in 2018. Later that year, he announced his candidacy for the 2019 presidential elections, expressing support for a negotiated peace settlement with the Taliban, though he subsequently withdrew from the race.

On 4 April 2020, he was appointed Acting Minister of Foreign Affairs and was formally approved by the Wolesi Jirga on 21 November 2020. He was sworn into office on 4 February 2021 and remained in the post until August 2021.

== Early life ==
Atmar was born in 1968 as son of Mohammad Asef Atmar in Laghman Province of Afghanistan to an aristocratic Pashtun family. As a young adult, he was part of one of many KHAD special operations units, KhAD being the Afghan security and intelligence agency with strong ties to the Soviet KGB. During the Soviet–Afghan War, he fought against the Mujahideen and lost a leg during the Battle of Jalalabad in 1989. Atmar left for the United Kingdom after the fall of Kabul.

== Studies and humanitarian work ==
In the UK he earned two degrees at the University of York: a diploma in Information Technology and Computers, and an M.A. in Public Policy, International Relations and Post-war Reconstruction studies, which he studied for from 1996 to 1997. He speaks fluent Pashto, Dari, English, Urdu, and Hindi. In 1992 Atmar began advising on Afghanistan and Pakistan for humanitarian agencies, which he would continue for two years. Following that he went to the Norwegian Church Aid, where he served as Program Manager for six years until 2001. That same year he was hired as the Deputy Director General of the International Rescue Committee for Afghanistan, but after the September 11th attacks, the 2001 U.S. invasion of Afghanistan, and the Bonn Agreement creating an Afghan Transitional Authority under Hamid Karzai, Atmar left to join the new government.

== Political career ==
=== Minister of Rural Rehabilitation and Development ===
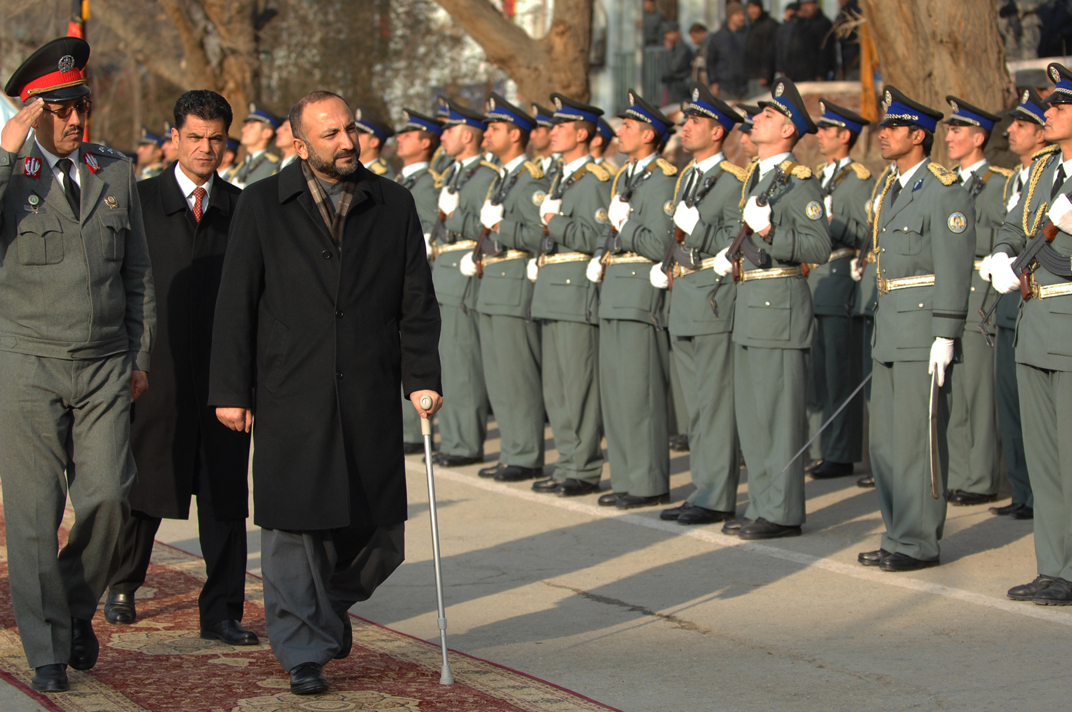
Mohammad Hanif Atmar, arrives at the graduation of Afghan National Police Academy cadets

In 2002, Atmar was invited to join the Transitional Government as the Minister of Rural Rehabilitation & Development and was confirmed with the same portfolio in the cabinet of the newly elected President Hamid Karzai in December 2004. As one of the youngest members of cabinet and a technocrat, he directed his energies into transforming a dysfunctional and non-descript ministry into one of national significance that reached into every province of the country, overseeing an annual budget of nearly 500 million dollars at the end of his four-year tenure.

Ercan Murat, Country Director for UNDP in Afghanistan described Atmar in 2004 as a human development champion. As head of a ministry that was considered a key consumer of international funds, his task entailed providing food security for the rural population, safe drinking water, alternatives for the drug-economy and building the necessary infrastructure for the economy in rural areas to develop.

=== Minister of Education ===
In May 2006, Atmar was sworn in as the Minister of Education after being approved by an overwhelming majority of the National Assembly.

He was a member of the Presidential Oversight Committee.

=== Minister of Interior ===
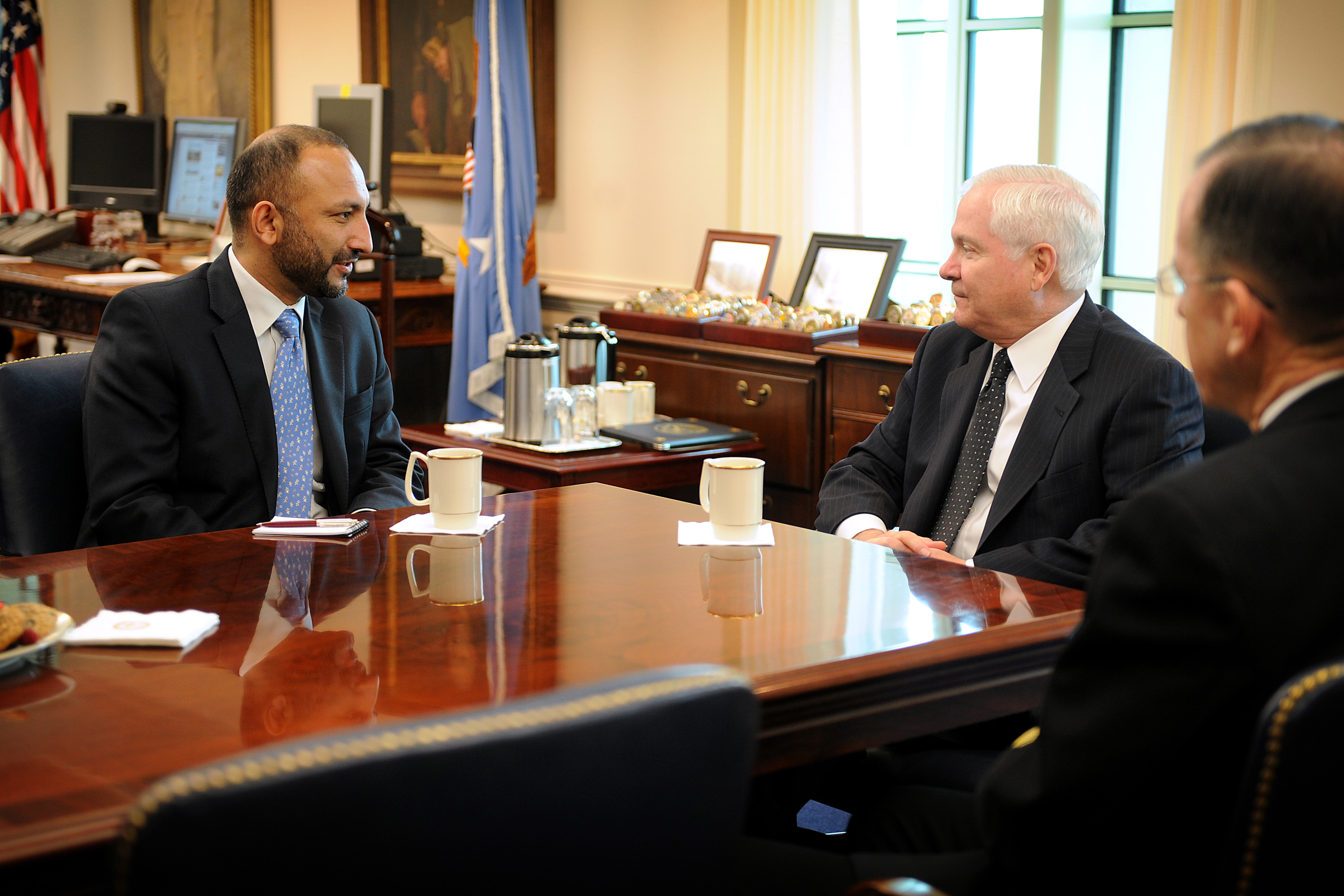
Atmar with U.S. Secretary of Defense Robert Gates and U.S. Navy admiral Michael Mullen at the Pentagon in Washington, D.C.

In October 2008, Atmar was sworn in as the Minister of Interior after being approved by a majority of the National Assembly.

=== Later career ===
When the Truth and Justice party was founded in 2011, he became a member of the party.

=== Minister of Foreign Affairs ===
Atmar was appointed the acting minister of foreign affairs by President Ashraf Ghani on 4 April 2020. Ghani also nominated him as minister on permanent basis, pending approval by the National Assembly. His nomination was approved by 197 of the 246 lawmakers present in the Wolesi Jirga on 21 November, with 24 opposing, nine votes being blank and 16 being invalid. He was sworn in on 4 February 2021.

== Works ==
- Development of Non-Governmental Organisations in Developing Countries
- From rhetoric to reality: The role of aid in local peacebuilding in Afghanistan. York: University of York. 1998. (with Arne Strand and Sultan Barakat)
- Humanitarian Aid, War and Peace in Afghanistan: What to Learn?
- Politics and Humanitarian Aid in Afghanistan and its Aftermath for the People of Afghanistan
- Afghanistan or a Stray War in Afghanistan.
- The Challenge of Winning the Peace, chapter written together with Jonathan Goodhand. published in: Searching for Peace in Central and South Asia, 2002

Political offices
Preceded by Zarar Ahmad Moqbel	Afghan Interior Minister; 11 October 2008 – 6 June 2010	Succeeded by Bismillah Khan Mohammadi
