= Herat Province =

Province of Afghanistan

Herat هرات
- Province
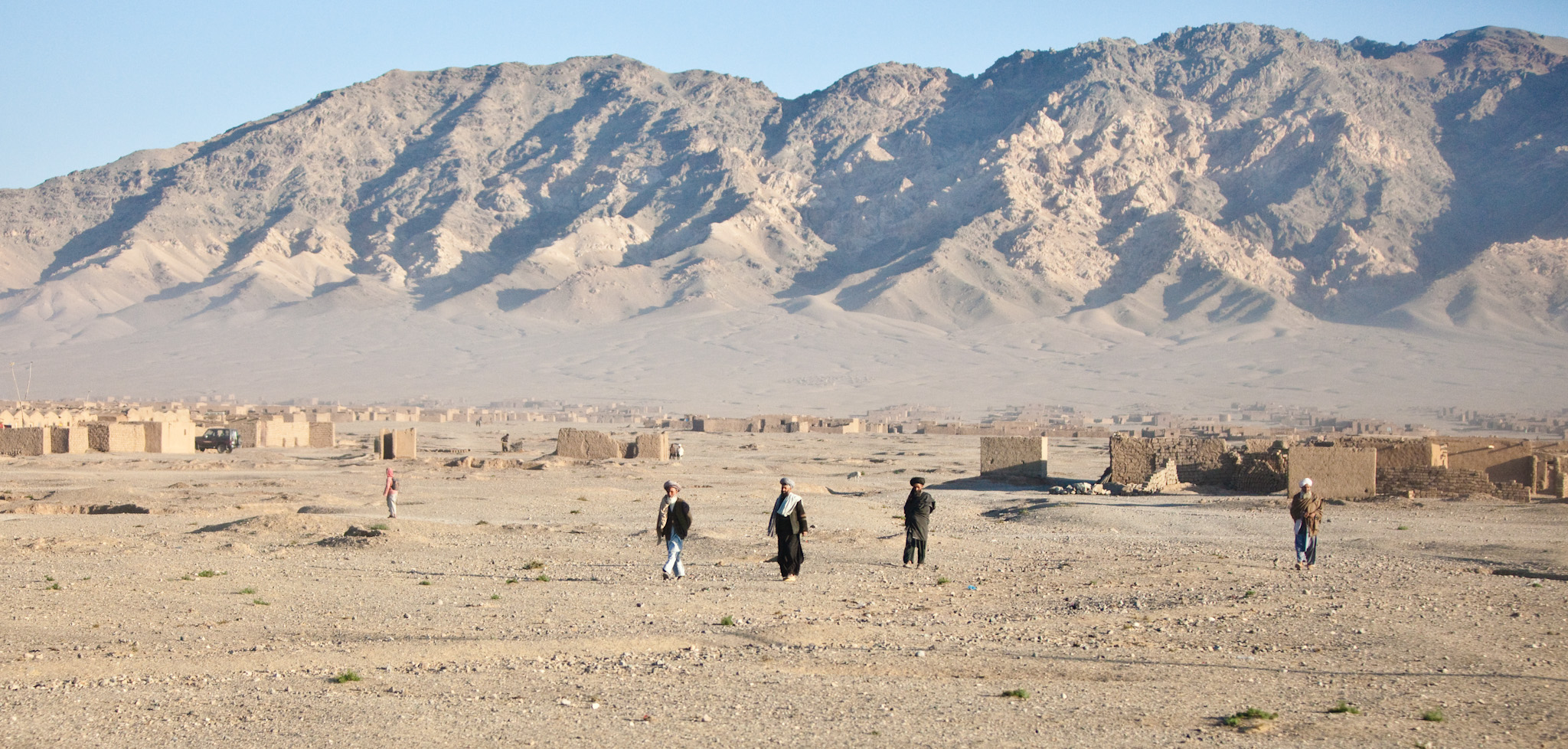
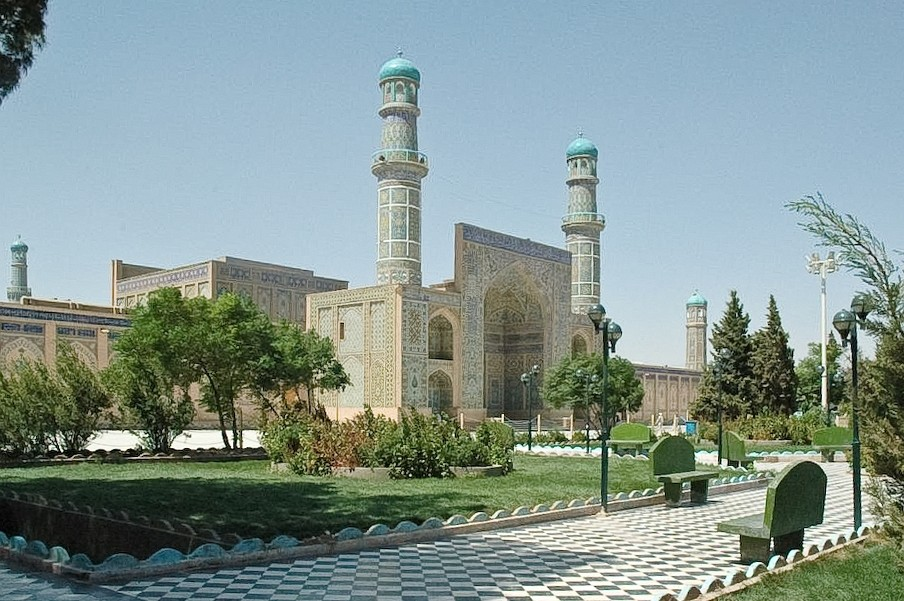
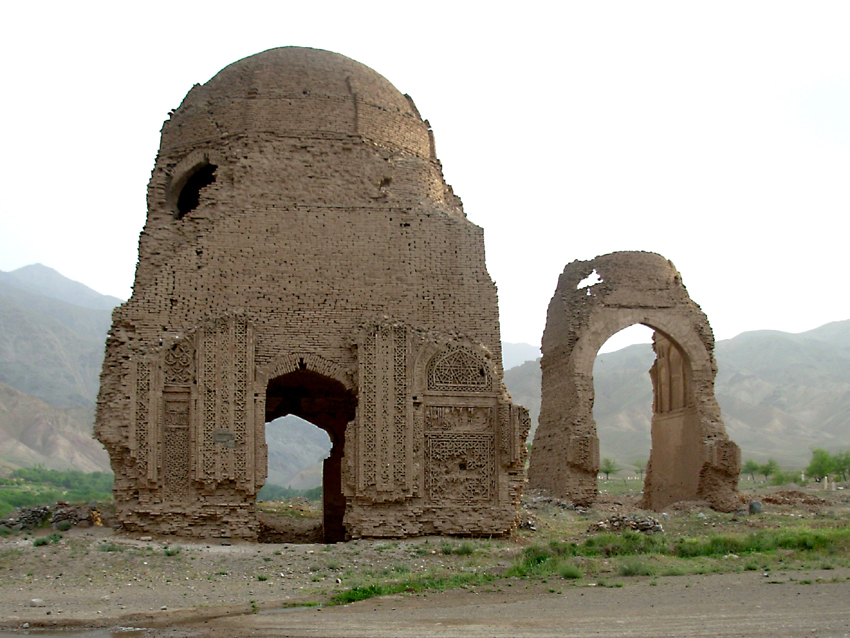
- From the top, Landscape of Herat Province, Great Mosque of Herat, Cheheltan-Chisht.

- Map of Afghanistan with Herat highlighted

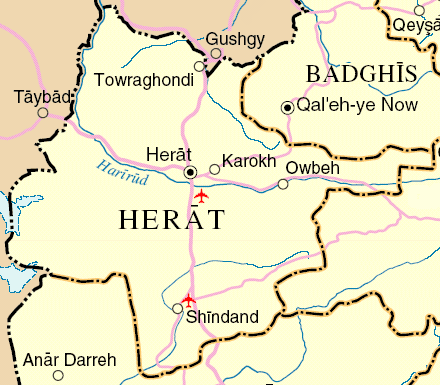
- Detail map of Herat province
- Coordinates (Capital): 34.0°N 62.0°E
- Country: Afghanistan
- Capital: Herat

Government
  - Governor: Noor Mohammad Islamjar
  - Deputy Governor: Abdul Qayyum Rohani

Area
  - Total: 55,868 km^{2} (21,571 sq mi)

Population (2021)
  - Total: 2,140,662
  - Density: 38.316/km^{2} (99.239/sq mi)
- Time zone: UTC+4:30 (Afghanistan Time)
- Postal code: 30xx
- ISO 3166 code: AF-HER
- Main languages: Pashto and Dari

Herat, (Note: Pashto: هراتPashto pronunciation: [ʔa.rɑt̪, ʔi.rɑt̪, ha.rɑt̪, hi.rɑt̪] Dari: هراتDari pronunciation: [ʔä.ɾɑ́ːt̪, ʔɪ.ɾɑ́ːt̪, hä.ɾɑ́ːt̪, hɪ.ɾɑ́ːt̪]) or Harat, is one of the thirty-four provinces of Afghanistan, located in the western part of the country. Together with Badghis, Farah, and Ghor provinces, it makes up the north-western region of Afghanistan. Its primary city and administrative capital is Herat city. The province of Herat is divided into about 17 districts and contains over 2,000 villages. It has a population of about 3,780,000, making it the second–most populated province in Afghanistan behind Kabul Province. The population is Multi-ethnic, but the majority are Persian speaking Tajiks.

Herat dates back to Avestan times and was traditionally known for its wine. The city has a number of historic sites, including the Herat Citadel and the Musalla Complex. During the Middle Ages, Herat became one of the important cities of Khorasan and was known as the Pearl of Khorasan.

The province of Herat shares a border with Iran in the west and Turkmenistan in the north, making it an important trading region. The Trans-Afghanistan Pipeline (TAPI) is expected to pass through Herat from Turkmenistan to Pakistan and India in the south. The province has two airports; one is Herat International Airport, in the capital Herat, and the other is at the Shindand Air Base, which is one of the largest military bases in Afghanistan. The Salma Dam, which is fed by the Hari River, is also located in this province.

== History ==
The region of Herat was historically part of Greater Khorasan, which was successively controlled by the Tahirids followed by the Saffarids, Samanids, Ghaznavids, Ghurids, Ilkhanids, Timurids, Safavids, Hotakis, Afsharids, Durranis, Qajarids until it became part of the modern state of Afghanistan.

During the 19th century, the British arrived from southern Afghanistan as part of the "Great Game" and backed up the Afghans during one Persian siege and one capture of the city, the former in 1838, and the latter in 1856 in order to prevent Persian or Russian influence reaching deeper in South Asia, and also, more importantly, to protect Britain's colony in India as part of the Great Game. The situation in the province then remained quiet and uneventful until the 1979 Soviet invasion of Afghanistan.

The province saw a number of battles during the 1980s Soviet war, and remained an active area of guerrilla warfare throughout, with local mujahideen commander Ismail Khan leading resistance against the Soviet-backed Afghan government. This continued until the Soviet Union withdrew all its forces in 1989.

When the Soviets withdrew from Afghanistan, Khan became the governor of the province, a position he retained until the Taliban forces from the south took control of the province in 1995. Following the ousting of the Taliban and establishment of the Karzai administration in late 2001, led by Hamid Karzai, Khan once again became governor of Herat.

Khan become a figure of controversy when the media began reporting that he was attempting to restrict freedom of the people, and that he was becoming more of an independent ruler as a warlord. He lost a son, Mirwais Sadiq, in 2004 during a fight with forces of other warlords. In response to this, the central government began expanding into the province with the newly trained Afghan National Security Forces (ANSF). Khan was ordered to leave his post to become a minister and live in Kabul.

After 2005, the International Security Assistance Force (ISAF) established a presence in the area to help assist the Afghan government. It was led by Italy. A multi-national Provincial Reconstruction Team (PRT) was also established to help the local population of the province. The United States established a consulate in Herat, trained Afghan security forces, and built schools and clinics.

Herat was one of the first seven areas that transitioned security responsibility from NATO to Afghanistan. On 21 July 2011, Afghan security forces assumed lead security responsibility from NATO. On the occasion, Minister of Defence Wardak told the audience, "This is our national responsibility to take over our security and defend our country."

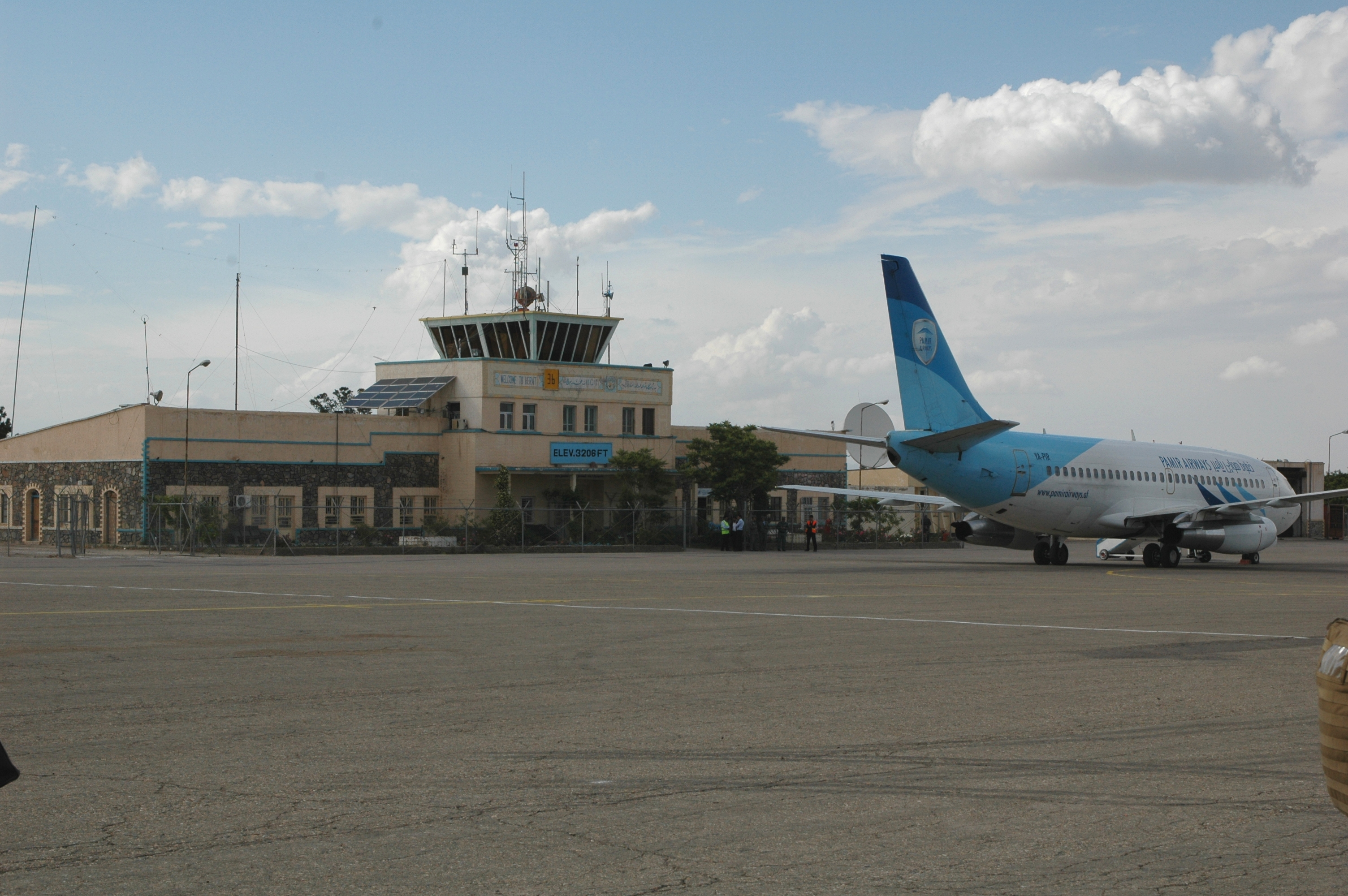
Herat International Airport

In December 2012, Afghanistan and Italy signed a "long term agreement" including a €150 million soft loan facility for infrastructure projects in Herat Province. In 2014 the agreement for a first soft loan worth about US$32 million was agreed for the upgrade of the Herat airport. In 2016 a second soft loan agreement worth about US$100 million was signed between Afghanistan and Italy for the construction a 155 km road between Herat and Chist-e Sharif. Italy also agreed to assess the possibility of a third soft loan worth about US$70 million for completing the railroad connection between Herat and Mashad in Iran. The Asian Development Bank is also implementing a feasibility study for the construction of a railway connection between Herat and Turkmenistan.

In 2023, Herat was heavily impacted by two major earthquakes, one of which was 6.3-magnitude earthquake, and the other an aftershock. Combined, the earthquakes killed over 2,800 and injured thousands more in the province. It has been called Afghanistan's worst earthquake since 1998. Herat was hit by a third earthquake of 6.3 magnitude in just over a week. It killed 2 people and injured almost 150.

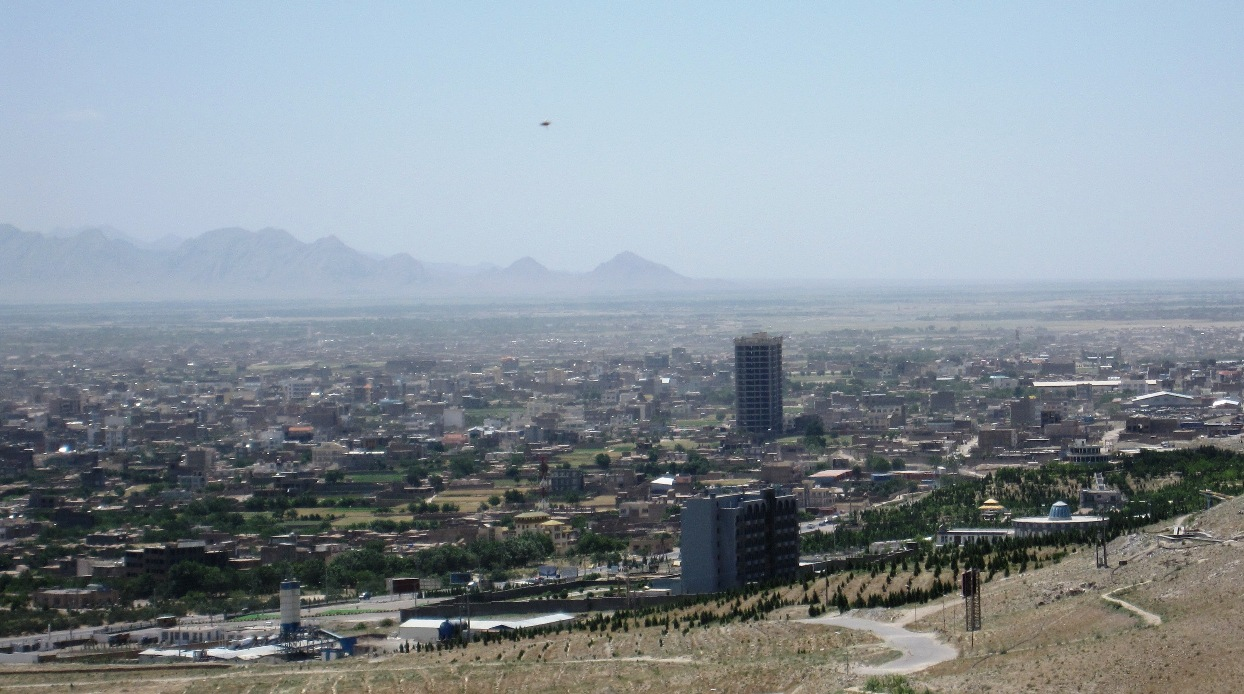
City of Herat, which is the capital of the province.

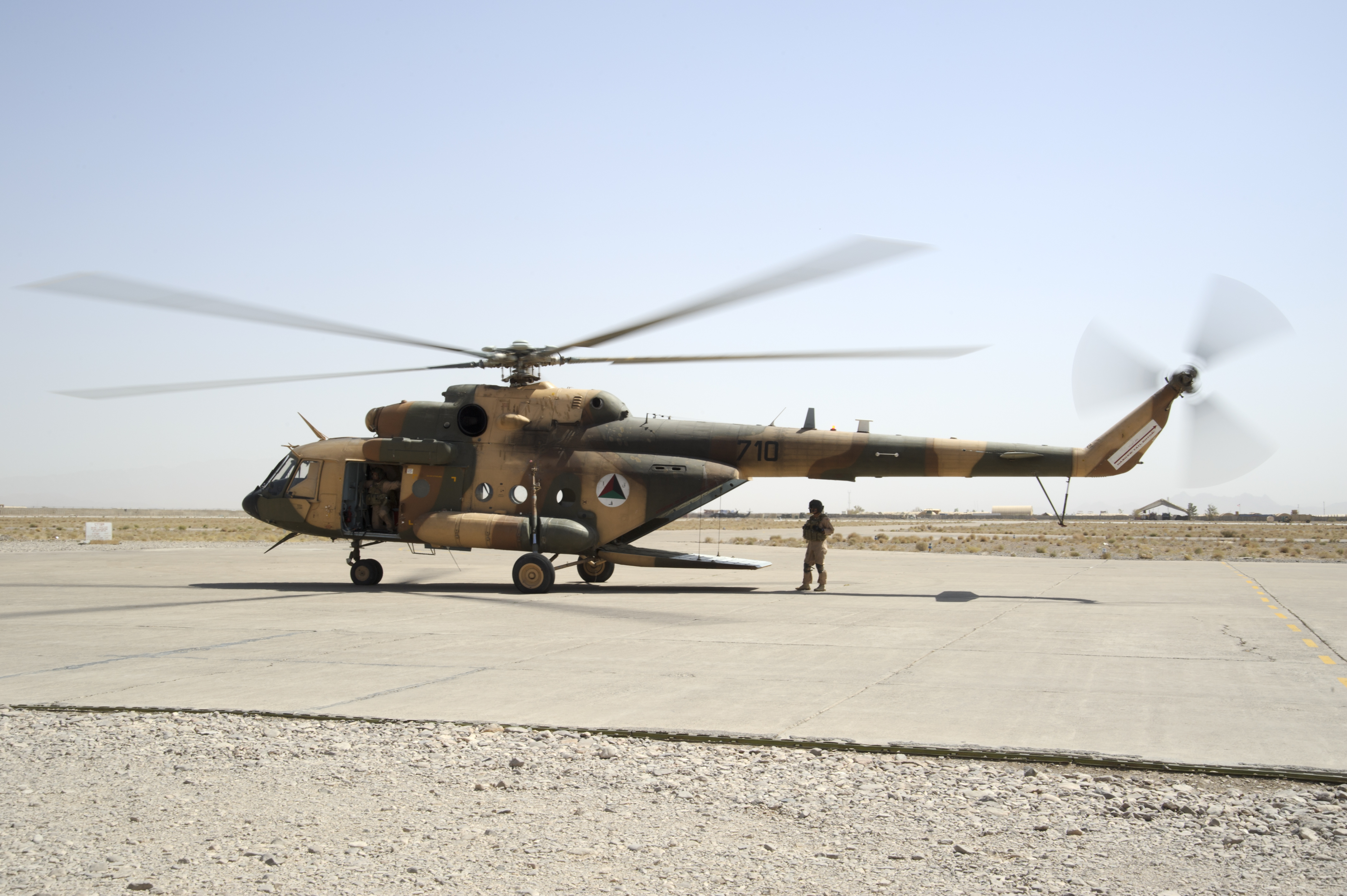
An Afghan Air Force Mi-17 helicopter sits on the ramp at Shindand Air Base in 2011.

== Administrative divisions ==
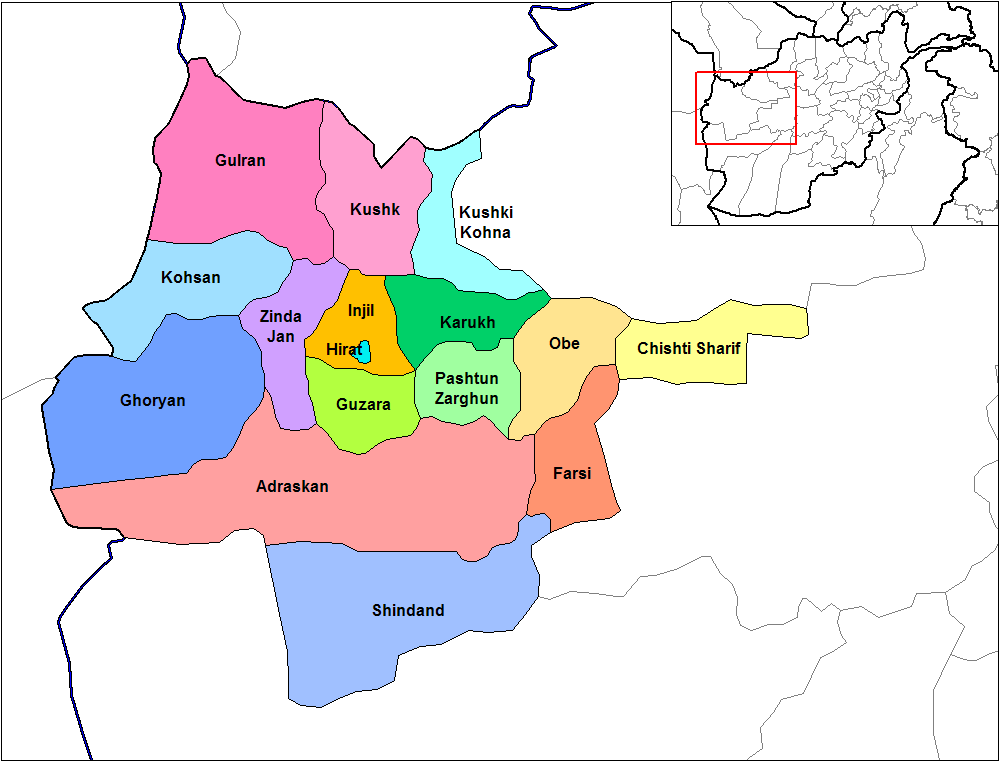
Map of the districts of Herat as of January 2004, prior to the redrawing of provincial and district boundaries later that year

The province is divided into 16 districts and contains over 1,000 villages.

Districts of Herat Province
District	Capital	Population	Area in km^{2}	Pop. density	Number of villages and ethnic groups
Adraskan		60,716	8,113	7	Predominantly Pashtuns, few Tajiks.
Chishti Sharif		26,838	1,626	17	Majority Tajiks, minority Pashtuns.
Farsi		34,676	2,194	16	Predominantly Tajiks, few Pashtuns and Uzbeks.
Ghoryan		101,878	7,934	13	Majority Pashtuns, minority Tajiks.
Gulran		106,420	5,544	19	Majority Pashtuns.
Guzara		165,940	2,455	68	Mixed Tajiks and Pashtuns.
Herat	Herat	574,276	234	2,452	Majority Tajiks, minority Pashtuns, few Hazaras, Uzbeks, Turkmens and others.
Injil/Enjil		276,479	896	308	Majority Tajiks, minority Pashtuns.
Karukh		72,530	2,123	34	Majority Tajiks, minority Pashtuns.
Kohsan		61,513	2,688	23	60% Pashtuns, 35% Tajiks, 5% Baloch.
Kushk		141,585	2,959	48	Majority Farsiwan (Aimaqs), minority Pashtuns, few Turkmens.
Kushki Kuhna		51,682	1,817	28	55% Tajik, 40% Pashtun, 5% Hazara.
Obe		85,836	2,427	35	Majority Tajiks, minority Uzbeks, few Pashtuns.
Pashtun Zarghun		113,329	2,196	52	Majority Tajiks, minority Pashtuns.
Shindand	Shindand	202,395	15,760	13	Majority Pashtuns, minority Tajiks.
Zinda Jan		64,569	2,542	25	Predominantly Tajiks, few Pashtuns.
Herat		2,140,662	55,869	38	39.8% Pashtuns, 37.1% Tajiks, 21.6% Aimaqs, 1.3% Uzbeks, 0.9% Turkmens, 0.2% Hazaras, 0.1% Balochi.

== Economy ==
The province is home to 90% of Afghanistan's Saffron production (a $12 million industry in 2014). In 2015 the World Bank noted that saffron cultivation had provided Herat Province's farmers a steady source of income, jobs for both men and women, and a decreased dependency on poppy cultivation.

With international borders to Iran and Turkmenistan and an international airport, trade could potentially play an important part in the economy of Herat Province. Due to the lack of urbanization in Herat Province, around 75% of the population lives in rural areas and economic activity is correspondingly heavily reliant on agriculture and horticulture production (saffron, rugs, cumin, marble, animal skins and wool) with around 82% of economic activity coming from these fields in 2011. Marble manufacturing and light industry comprised the remaining areas of economic activity.

== Demographics ==
=== Population ===
As of 2020, the total population of the province is about 2,187,169, the majority of which live in rural parts. According to Afghanistan's Ministry of Rural Rehabilitation and Development:

=== Ethnicity, languages and religion ===
In Herat, a distinct Herati identity plays a central role in shaping social life, reflecting centuries of urban development, trade, Persianate cultural influence, and sustained cross-border interaction. This identity is rooted primarily in the local Herati Persian dialect, but also in a shared urban culture, collective historical experience, and commonly accepted social norms. It is reinforced through customs, cuisine, music, and communal participation, and frequently transcends rigid ethnic, linguistic, or religious boundaries. As a result, many residents primarily identify as "Herati", fostering a strong sense of regional belonging even within ethnically diverse communities.

Within this broader framework, a substantial portion of the population belongs to Persian-speaking communities, including Tajiks, Farsiwan, Aimaq groups, and Hazaras. Historically, the city of Herat has often been described as a Tajik-dominated urban enclave within a predominantly Pashtun province, alongside significant Hazara and Aimaq minorities. Since 2001, large-scale migration—particularly of Hazaras—has further diversified the urban population, at times giving rise to social tensions between long-established residents and newer arrivals.

Persian-speaking communities in Herat include both Sunni and Shia Muslims. Sunni Dari speakers are prominent in both urban and rural settings, while Shia Dari-speaking communities—distinct from Hazara groups—have long been concentrated in the provincial capital. The term Farsiwan functions as a flexible social label applied to settled urban Persian speakers of diverse origins and both sects, including individuals of Pashtun background, and often overlaps with broader Persian-speaking identities in western Afghanistan. In recent usage, the term has increasingly become interchangeable with Tajik. Aimaq tribes such as the Jamshidi, Taimuri, and Firozkohi are predominantly Sunni and Dari-speaking, and depending on context, they may emphasize tribal affiliation, Aimaq identity, or inclusion within the wider Persian-speaking population.

Pashtuns constitute another major component of Herat's population and represent an important intersection between ethnic and linguistic categories. While the province as a whole has historically been described as Pashtun-majority, and Pashto remains central to Pashtun ethnic identity, many Pashtuns—particularly in urban and semi-urban environments—speak Dari as a first language and participate fully in Persian-speaking cultural and social life. Pashtuns in Herat are overwhelmingly Sunni Muslim, and their widespread bilingualism further reinforces the fluid and interconnected nature of identity in the province. Seasonal and semi-nomadic Kochi populations also form part of this broader Pashtun presence, with more than 4% of the total Kochi population residing in Herat during the winter months.

Smaller communities include Uzbeks and Turkmen, who are predominantly Sunni Muslim and speak Turkic languages, mainly residing in the northern districts of the province, alongside other minor groups. Historically, Herat was also home to Hindu, Armenian, and Jewish communities, particularly during the 19th century.

Estimated ethnolinguistic and -religious composition
Ethnicity	Pashtun	Tajik/ Farsiwan	Aimaq	Hazara	Uzbek	Turkmen	Sources
Period	Pashtun	Tajik/ Farsiwan	Aimaq	Hazara	Uzbek	Turkmen	Sources

2004–2021 (Islamic Republic)	40 – 50%	<40 – ≤50%	∅	∅	2%	
2020 EU	1st	2nd	–	3rd	–	–
2020 CSSF (Note: Demographic information is based on data from 2020.)	40%	<40%	–	∅	∅	–
2018 UN	98%				2%	
2017 EU	majority	∅	∅	∅	∅	∅
2015 CP	minority	majority	–	∅	∅	∅
2015 NPS	∅ (Note: incl. Kuchi and Karkar.)	∅	∅ (Note: incl. Chahar Aimaq (Timuri, Firozkohi, and Jamshidi) and Aimaq Hazara ("Qala-i Naw").)	∅	–	–
2011 PRT	98% (Note: excl. Kochi.)				2%	
2011 USA	∅	∅	–	∅	–	–
2010 IWPR	50%	–	–	–	–	–
2009 ISW	≤50% (Note: incl. Kuchi.)	≤50%	∅	∅	–	–
2009 EB	predominant (Note: incl. Durrani Pashtuns.)	predominant	∅ (Note: incl. "seminomadic Dari-speaking peoples".)	–	–	–

Legend:
- ∅: Ethnicity mentioned in source but not quantified
- –: Ethnicity not mentioned specifically
- Source abbreviations: Empirical sources: –, Government sources: CP – Colombo Plan, EU – European Union Agency for Asylum, PRT – Provincial Reconstruction Team of the United States government, UN – United Nations Assistance Mission in Afghanistan, Editorial sources: CSSF – Center for the Scientific Study of Families, EB – Encyclopaedia Britannica, ISW – Institute for the Study of War, IWPR – Institute for War and Peace Reporting, NPS – Naval Postgraduate School, USA – United States Army

=== Education ===
The overall literacy rate (6+ years of age) fell from 36% in 2005 to 25% in 2011. The overall net enrolment rate (6–13 years of age) fell from 55% in 2005 to 52% in 2011. Herat University is Afghanistan's second largest university with over 10,000 students, 14 faculties and 45 departments in 2014.

=== Health ===
The percentage of households with clean drinking water fell from 31% in 2005 to 28% in 2011. The percentage of births attended to by a skilled birth attendant increased from 24% in 2005 to 25% in 2011.

== Sport ==
Football is the popular sport in Herat Province, and in recent years cricket is also growing in popularity. The Province is represented in domestic competitions by the Herat Province cricket team. Afghanistan's national sport Buzkashi and a number of other sports are also played in the region.

== Notable people ==
- Abbas the Great – Safavid ruler
- Sultan Husayn Mirza Bayqara – Timurid ruler of Herat
- Mirwais Hotak – founder of the Hotak dynasty
- Ismail Khan – Tajik Commander of Jamiat Islami
- Ahmad Shah Durrani – founder of the Durrani dynasty
- Ali-Shir Nava'i – poet, writer, politician, linguist, mystic, and painter
- Faramarz Tamanna
- Zablon Simintov

== See also ==
- Azizabad airstrike
- Provinces of Afghanistan
- Provincial Reconstruction Team (PRT)
- Train Advise Assist Command - West
- Herat Provincial Overview
