= Sheikh Ali District =

Sheikh Ali شیخ‌علی
- District
- Location in Afghanistan
- Coordinates: 34.9463°N 68.5188°E
- Country: Afghanistan
- Province: Parwan

Population
  - Ethnicities: Hazara people
  - Religions: Islam
- Time zone: + 4.30

Sheikh Ali (Dari: شیخ‌علی) is a district in Parwan province, Afghanistan.

== Demographics ==
The Sheikh Ali district is inhabited by ethnic Hazaras.

Sheikh Ali Valley, Sheikh Ali District, Parwan Province, Afghanistan

== See also ==
- Districts of Afghanistan
- Sheikh Ali (Hazara tribe)
