= Panjshir offensives (Soviet–Afghan War) =

1980–1985 series of battles

- Part of the Soviet–Afghan War
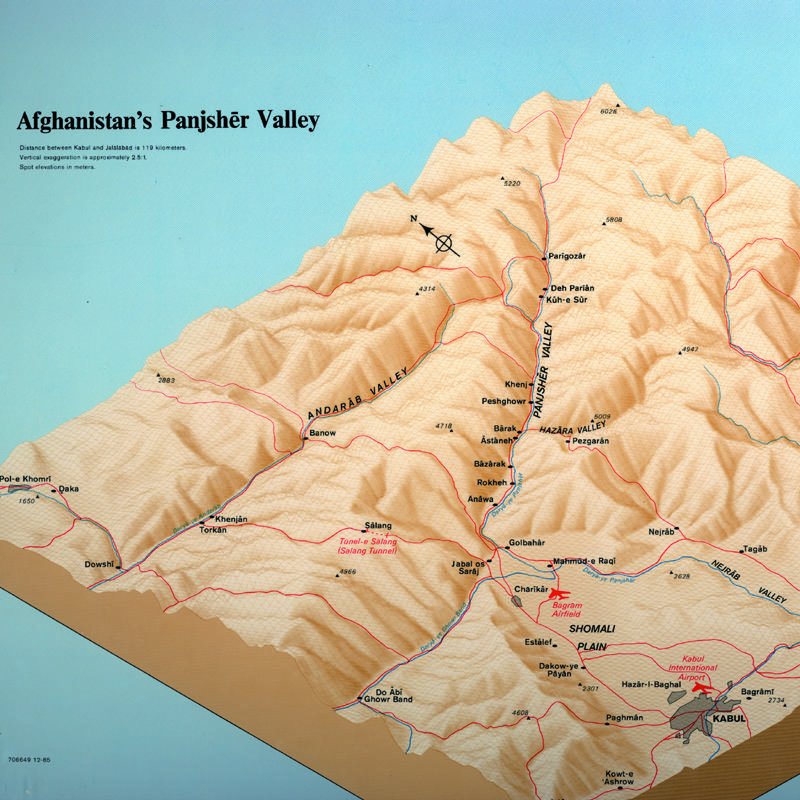
- Map of the Panjshir Valley
Date	9 April 1980 – 16 June 1985 (5 years, 2 months and 1 week)
Location	Panjshir Valley, Afghanistan 35°21′N 69°35′E
Result	Mujahideen victory

Belligerents
Soviet Union; Afghanistan	Afghan mujahideen; Jamiat-e Islami; Supported by: United Kingdom; MI6

Commanders and leaders
(Soviet Union) Sergei Sokolov; (Soviet Union) Norat Ter-Grigoryants; (Soviet Union) Ruslan Aushev; (Afghanistan) Babrak Karmal	Ahmad Shah Massoud

Strength
32,000+ men, 900+ armoured vehicles, 307+ artillery pieces, 184+ helicopters, 55+ airplanes	<3000 men

Casualties and losses
5,000 killed and wounded, unknown Afghan losses	Low casualties

The Panjshir offensives (Russian: Панджшерские операции – Panjsher Operations) were a series of battles from 1980 to 1985 between the Soviet Army, the Afghan Armed Forces and groups of Afghan mujahideen under Ahmad Shah Massoud. The goal of these offensives was control of the strategic Panjshir Valley in Afghanistan, during the Soviet–Afghan War of the 1980s.

These battles saw some of the most violent fighting of the whole war. During the nine campaigns launched, coordinated Soviet assaults would regularly drive out the mujahideen from the valley, but they would return as soon as the Soviets left.

== A strategic objective ==
The Panjshir Valley lies 70 km north of Kabul, in the Hindu Kush mountains close to the Salang Pass, which connects Kabul to the northern areas of Afghanistan and further on to Uzbekistan, then part of the Soviet Union. In June 1979, an insurrection led by Ahmad Shah Massoud expelled all government forces, and the valley became a guerrilla stronghold. From the Panjshir, mujahideen groups frequently carried out ambushes of Soviet convoys bringing supplies to the 40th Army stationed in Afghanistan. The Salang Pass became a dangerous area, and Soviet truck drivers were even awarded decorations for having successfully crossed it. The pressure on the logistics system led the Soviet command to try to dislodge the rebels.

Massoud only had the support of Britain's MI6 who were able to supply intelligence via radios and was able to coordinate his forces and be warned of any impending Soviet attacks. The Cheltenham-based GCHQ intercepted and translated Soviet battle plan communications which was then relayed to the Afghans. An annual mission of two MI6 officers, as well as military instructors, were sent to Massoud and his fighters. MI6 also helped to retrieve crashed Soviet helicopters from Afghanistan.

== Soviet strategy ==
Soviet offensives into the Panjshir Valley had three main tactical features. There was (1) the concentration of air assets, including extensive aerial bombardment of a target area, followed by (2) the landing of helicopter forces to stop the withdrawal of enemy forces and engage the enemy from unexpected directions and (3) a drive by mechanized forces into areas of guerrilla support in conjunction with the helicopter landing parties. These tactics caused great destruction for civilians. By destroying all crops and livestock and forcing the mass emigration of civilians from the Panjshir Valley, the Soviets hoped to deprive Massoud of resources to sustain his full-time fighters.

The tactic had some success as, in order to rebuild his organization, Massoud was forced to sign a ceasefire treaty in January 1983 that would last for a year. However, these victories were not permanent. There were serious issues with the tactic of large punitive offensives, which contributed to the stalemate that characterized the war. Mujahideen forces would often learn of coming offensives in advance from their compatriots in the Democratic Republic of Afghanistan (DRA) army. Not only could civilians and guerrillas move safely out of the way of the majority of the bombs, but guerrillas could also plan ambushes, lay mines, and move weapons caches. Once armored personnel carriers and helicopters arrived, the guerrillas would retreat into the side valleys and carry out small ambushes, rather than openly confront the Soviets.

== Timeline ==
=== Panjshir I–III ===
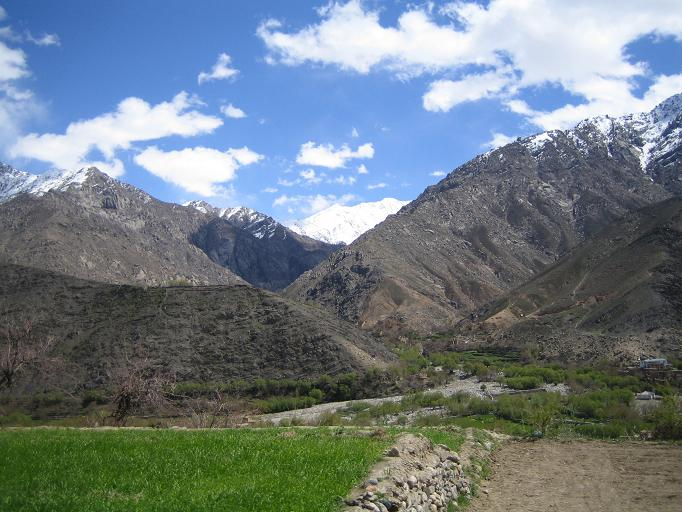
The Panjshir valley

The First Panjshir Offensive took place in April 1980, four months after the arrival of Soviet forces in Afghanistan. It involved three Soviet battalions, of which one was the fourth battalion of the 56th Guards Air Assault Brigade led by Captain Leonid Khabarov, and 1,000 men of the Afghan Army, more specifically the 37th Commando Brigade, and security forces. The overall commander of the operation was General Pechevoy.

The mujahideen numbered 1,000 according to Soviet intelligence or no more than 200 according to Afghan sources. They were armed only with antiquated rifles and had not constructed any defensive works, but laid mines on the only road. The advance proceeded up the valley, capturing Bazarak after a fight and overrunning Massoud's headquarters in Pasishah-Mardan, where various documents were found. Khabarov was injured in the fighting, taking a bullet to the forearm. The rebels deliberately let the Soviet/DRA force into the valley and ambushed them as they withdrew. During the four-day operation, the Soviets claimed to have inflicted heavy casualties on the rebels, but the mujahideen newspaper Call of Jihad put their losses at four killed.

The first operation installed a garrison of Afghan troops in a fort in the town of Rokha, but they soon came under siege by the mujahideen and suffered constant losses from harassing fire. Beginning on August 28, a new offensive, The Second Panjshir Offensive was carried out by Afghan and Soviet troops. It included for the first time a heliborne landing by air assault troops. Again the mujahideen did not oppose the offensive frontally, but harassed and ambushed the Soviets and DRA troops as they passed. The operation lasted 21 days. The mujahideen admitted to 25 killed in their own ranks and claimed to have inflicted 500 casualties on their opponents and shot down several helicopters.

Despite the operation, rebel pressure on Rokha, including the use of captured artillery pieces, did not let up. On November 8, a convoy of government trucks escorted by Soviet armoured vehicles reached the besieged post. Dismounted Soviet and DRA troops engaged the mujahideen on the heights around the town in an effort to break the siege. One of Massoud's subcommanders was killed and the surrounding villages suffered heavily from indiscriminate bombing by Soviet aircraft, but the siege continued.

The final operation of 1980 began on December 12. Heavy airstrikes hit the valley, causing the death of 100 civilians and 15 mujahideen. The fort at Rokha was finally evacuated on December 27, and the operation ended two days later, leaving the valley mostly under rebel control.

=== Panjshir IV – September 6, 1981 ===
By this time, Massoud had mustered enough men to openly resist the Soviet assault. During this offensive, to avoid losing vehicles to land mines, the Soviets sent their sapper units to clear the way in front of the main force. This tactic proved costly, and the attack force penetrated only 25 km into the valley before retiring, after suffering 100 casualties.

=== Panjshir V – May 16, 1982 ===
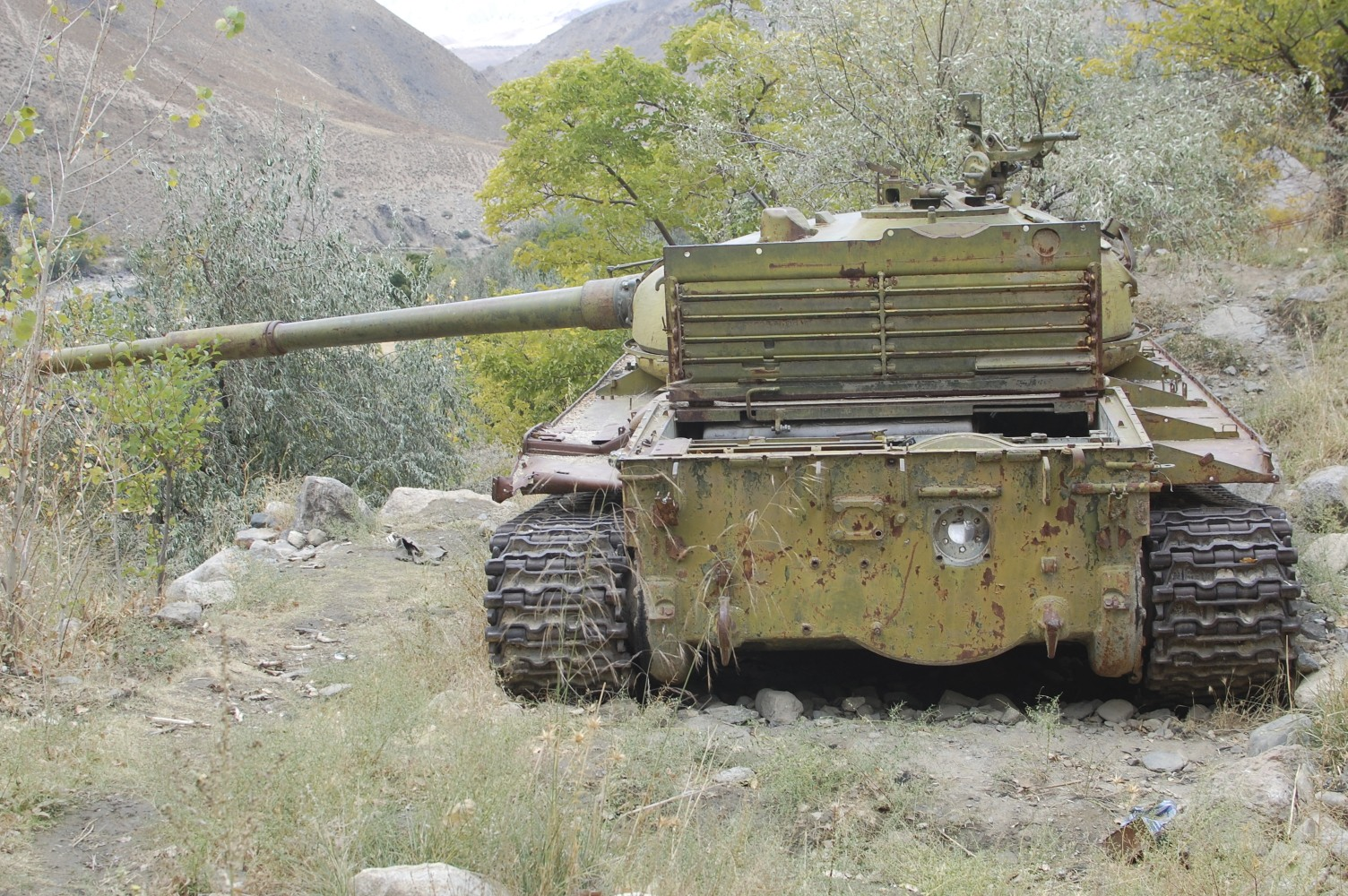
Abandoned Soviet-era T-62 in the Panjshir valley

By 1982 Massoud had built up his forces to 3,000 men, and other mujahideen from neighbouring areas could come to his aid The approaches to the valley were strengthened with defensive positions established on dominant heights and near narrow passages. Hollowed-out caves were used as supply depots and shelters.

The first major offensive was carried out by a force of 12,000 Afghan and Soviet soldiers under the command of General Norat Ter-Grigoryants with 320 armoured vehicles, 155 artillery pieces, and supported by 104 helicopters and 26 airplanes. The Soviet units involved were the 108th Motor Rifle Division, 201st Motor Rifle Division, the 103rd Guards Airborne Division, who each contributed one regiment, the 66th Separate Motor Rifle Brigade, elements of the 860th Separate Motor-Rifle Regiment, the 191st Separate Motor-Rifle Regiment and the 345th Independent Guards Airborne Regiment. The plan for the operation was prepared in secret by a small number of 40th Army officers. In order to deceive the mujahideen a diversionary attack up the Ghorband valley was planned. This was presented as the real attack to the Afghan Army staff, which included mujahideen sympathizers, and who then leaked the plan to the resistance.

The main assault began on the night of May 16, after an intense aviation and artillery bombardment. While motorized rifle battalions, preceded by reconnaissance units, attacked the dominating features at the entrance of the valley, airborne units were airlifted by helicopter behind the main mujahideen defenses. In all, 4,200 troops were airlifted into the valley to capture strategic points, right up to the Pakistani border, in an effort to cut the mujahideen supply lines. In some areas the fighting was intense: when a Soviet paratrooper regiment landed east of Rukha, it was quickly encircled and suffered significant losses. The beleaguered paratroopers were saved only by the arrival of a motorised rifle battalion led by Major Aushev, who forced his way through the mujahideen defenses, consisting of well-located strong points, and captured Rukha. For his actions, Aushev was awarded the title of Hero of the Soviet Union.

Massoud, who expected an attack similar to the previous ones, had disposed his defenses close to the entrance of the valley, and was thus unable to prevent the Soviets from gaining footholds in the Panjshir. They established three main bases at Rukha, Bazarak and Anava. Most of the mujahideen had survived the attack and Massoud divided them into small, mobile groups that fought the Soviets all down the valley.

During this offensive, the Soviets managed to occupy a large part of the Panjshir and scored some successes against Massoud's organization, such as the capture of a list of the names of 600 of his agents in Kabul. However, most of the rebels had escaped capture, and this was not the decisive victory the Soviets had been hoping for. Also, their heavily fortified bases only gave them control over the valley floor, while the surrounding heights were still held by the mujahideen. For this reason they decided to launch a sixth offensive.

=== Panjshir VI – August–September 1982 ===
The sixth offensive consisted of a series of sweeps conducted by motorized units and airborne Spetsnaz units, launched from their bases in the Panjshir, to find and destroy the mujahideen hideouts. It was accompanied by a heavy aerial bombardment of villages suspected of harbouring rebel groups, notably carried out by Tu-16 bombers flying from inside the Soviet Union. Airborne troops carried out search and destroy missions, encircling Massoud's mobile units and destroying some of them. However, attrition among the mujahideen was generally low, and the brunt of the attacks fell on the civilian population, who suffered heavily, many of them preferring to flee the valley.

Despite bitter fighting, the Soviets were unable to eradicate the mujahideen, and the battle soon developed into a stalemate. During the 5th and 6th offensives the Soviets suffered up to 3,000 casualties, and 1,000 Afghan Army soldiers defected to the Mujahideen.

Once the height of the offensive had passed, many areas captured by the Soviet forces were handed over to Afghan army units, who suffered from low morale and high desertion rates. They were the targets for Massoud's counterattacks. In a series of surprise attacks, several government outposts fell to the rebels. The first was the Afghan Army outpost at Saricha, which the mujahideen captured along with 80 prisoners and 8 tanks, despite having to cross a minefield. The government post at Birjaman fell soon after, and the mujahideen were able to recapture some areas in this way. These operations, along with the continued harassment of Soviet garrisons and resupply convoys, proved that the mujahideen were far from defeated, and convinced the Soviets that they must negotiate a truce with Massoud.

In January 1983, for the first time a ceasefire was concluded between the Soviets and the mujahideen, lasting 6 months, and later extended. Negotiated by Massoud in person with a colonel of the GRU, Anatoly Tkachev, the agreement stipulated that Soviet troops should evacuate the Panjshir, except for a small garrison at Anava, whose access was controlled by the mujahideen. The area covered by the ceasefire included the Panjshir valley, but not the Salang pass, where fighting continued.

Massoud took advantage of the truce to extend his influence over areas that had until then been held by hostile factions loyal to Gulbuddin Hekmatyar's Hezb-i-islami party, like in Andarab District. More peacefully, he took control of the Khost-Fereng sector, and some areas in southern Takhar Province, while establishing contacts with other guerrilla groups in Baghlan Province, and persuading them to adopt his military organisation. He also ordered the strengthening of defenses in five subsidiary valleys as well as in the Panjshir, permitting a defense in depth, and withdrew his headquarters to Shira Mandara, in Takhar province, in anticipation of a renewed assault.

=== Panjshir VII – April 19 to September 1984 ===
In February 1984, Konstantin Chernenko replaced Yuri Andropov as General Secretary of the Communist Party of the Soviet Union. While Andropov had supported the ceasefire, Chernenko, a disciple of Brezhnev, believed that the guerrillas should be rooted out through military action, an opinion which he shared with Babrak Karmal, president of the DRA. As a result a new offensive was planned, which, in Karmal's words, should be decisive and merciless, and in order to destroy the Panjshir valley bases, all those living there should be killed. It was the largest offensive in the region to date.

However, some Soviets, who were supporters of Andropov, disagreed with this policy, and they gave Massoud advance warning of the attack. Through this channel, and thanks to his agents in the DRA government, Massoud had a precise idea of the Soviet plans, and he was able to counter them. To avoid civilian casualties, all 30,000 inhabitants of the Panjshir (from a population of 100,000 before the war) were evacuated to safe areas. Only ambush parties were left to delay the Soviet advance. All the roads, villages and helicopter landing zones were heavily mined. All these preparations were carried out in secret, and a token activity was maintained near the Soviet base at Anava, to deceive the Soviets into believing that a conventional defense was being prepared.

11,000 Soviet and 2,600 Afghan soldiers, under Marshal of the Soviet Union Sergei Sokolov, participated in the offensive, supported by 200 airplanes and 190 helicopters. On April 22, after a two-day bombardment of the region by Tu-16, Tu-22M and Su-24 bombers, they advanced rapidly into the Panjshir. Several battalion-strength forces were placed at key passes leading out of the Panjshir Valley while at the same time large helicopter troop landings were made in tributary valleys connected to the Panjshir. By blocking the mujahideen's withdrawal routes and securing the high ground, the Soviets forced them higher into the mountains than they had previously ventured and scattered their strength as they attempted to avoid being trapped by the helicopter landings. Once the strength of Massoud's forces were dealt such a deadly blow, rather than withdrawing from the valley as they had previously done, the Soviets began setting up a system of forts and posts throughout the main valley, while relinquishing control of the side valleys. These tactics proved more effective at rooting out insurgents and breaking up their fighting forces during the offensive, but had limited long-term success. The forts and outposts along the Panjshir Valley were unable to protect roads and convoys as well as they had hoped and these installations proved attractive targets for the mujahideen to harass. Much of the valley was occupied, but the Soviets paid a heavy price; many soldiers were killed by mines and in ambushes. During one battle, on April 30 in the Hazara Valley, the 1st Battalion of the 682nd Motor Rifle Regiment was decimated: the losses of Soviet troops were estimated at 60 killed.

For the Soviets, the operation was partly successful – some of the infrastructure of the mujahideen, created in the time of the truce in 1982–1983, was destroyed. Babrak Karmal completed a propaganda visit to the Panjshir, which for some time had become a safe zone. However, it quickly became apparent that most of Massoud's forces had escaped the onslaught, and were still able to carry out their harassment tactics. Eventually, in September, the Soviet-DRA forces once again evacuated the Panjshir Valley, leaving occupying forces only in the lower Panjshir.

Yousaf and Adkin reported in 1992 that the Soviet forces involved included the 180th Motor Rifle Regiment, battalions of the 66th Motor Rifle Brigade and 191st Motor Rifle Regiment, a regiment of the 103rd Guards Airborne Division, a battalion of the 345th Independent Guards Airborne Regiment, accompanied by Afghan forces including the 8th Division, the 20th Division, and the 37th Commando Brigade. It seems likely that the reference to the '180th Motor Rifle Regiment' refers to the 682nd Motor Rifle Regiment of the 108th Motor Rifle Division, based in Kabul.

=== Panjshir VIII – September 1984 ===
The 8th offensive was a follow-up to the 7th, involving mostly airborne forces.

=== Panjshir IX – 16 June 1985 ===
In 1985, Massoud successfully captured the Peshgur Garrison, which Massoud's mobile groups took 500 prisoners including 130 officers and killed brigadier Ahmadoddin of the Afghan Army. After some investigation, the prisoners were divided into several groups, the ordinary soldiers were released after a short investigation and went to their homes, but the officers and important people were divided into several places and camps, most of them in Tangi Mekni in a place known as Bibi Nikzan. They were kept and there was also a health clinic in addition to the prison. Massoud wanted to exchange the 130 high-ranking prisoners for their own captured fighters. He reached an agreement with a khalqi officer, which prompted the soviets to launch their ninth offensive in the panjshir, to prevent the exchange.

The Soviet counter-attack installed a new garrison in Peshgur, and pursued the retreating mujahideen. The group escorting the captured Afghan officers was caught in the open by Soviet helicopters, and in the ensuing fight most of the prisoners were killed. It's hotly disputable who killed the prisoners and the truth has never been ascertained The mujahideen claimed that Soviet gunships caught the prisoners and killed them, while the government and soviets claim the prisoners were executed and tortured by the mujahideen. Some considered the mujahideen claim suspicious however, Michael Barry tends to claim Massoud was innocent, after all he was the one who made the initial offer of exchanging prisoners. Michael G. Vickers also states in his book that the soviets succeeded only in killing all the prisoners while Massouds forces escaped.

In the same year, corpses of Afghan Army troops, as well as the corpses of PDPA party members, ordinary people and the parents who allowed their sons to join the Afghan Armed Forces, were discovered by the Soviet Army and detachments of Afghan paratroopers in Panjshir, more specifically "Safed-Chir" gorge. The corpses would subsequently be dragged out and laid out in straight lines after their discovery. Kabul National TV and Soviet media from the State Television and Radio Fund claimed that these soldiers and civilians were initially prisoners who were dragged down the stairs in the area, before being locked in underground prisons, being tortured and denied food and water before being executed by the mujahideen in Panjshir. An Afghan paratrooper who was interviewed claimed that 264 people died in the killings perpetrated by Jamiat-e Islami altogether.

== Aftermath ==
In 1986, Mikhail Gorbachev announced his intention of withdrawing the Soviet contingent from Afghanistan. From then on the Soviets were mostly concerned with avoiding losses in the Panjshir sector, and they observed a tacit ceasefire: unprovoked shooting by Soviet troops was forbidden, and the mujahideen refrained from attacking Soviet bases. Despite provocations ordered by Najibullah's government to draw the Soviets into further fighting, the situation generally remained calm, enabling Massoud to carry out his "strategic offensive", capturing much of Baghlan and Takhar provinces. The last Soviet and Afghan troops present in the lower Panjshir were finally evacuated in June 1988.
