= Bazarak (disambiguation) =

Bazarak is the capital city of Panjshir Province, Afghanistan.

Bazarak may also refer to:

- Bazarak, Balkh, Afghanistan
- Bazarak District, a district of Panjshir Province in northeastern Afghanistan. The administrative centre is the city of Bazarak
