= Sima Samar =

Afghan human right activist (born 1957)

- سیما سمر
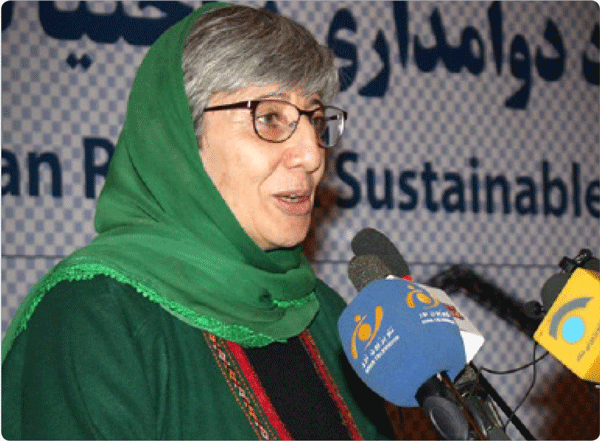
- Samar in 2017

Minister of Women's Affairs of Afghanistan
- In office December 2001 – 2003
- President: Hamid Karzai
- Preceded by: None
- Succeeded by: Habiba Sarabi

Personal details
- Born: 3 February 1957 (age 69) Jaghori, Ghazni, Kingdom of Afghanistan
- Awards: Ramon Magsaysay Award Right Livelihood Award

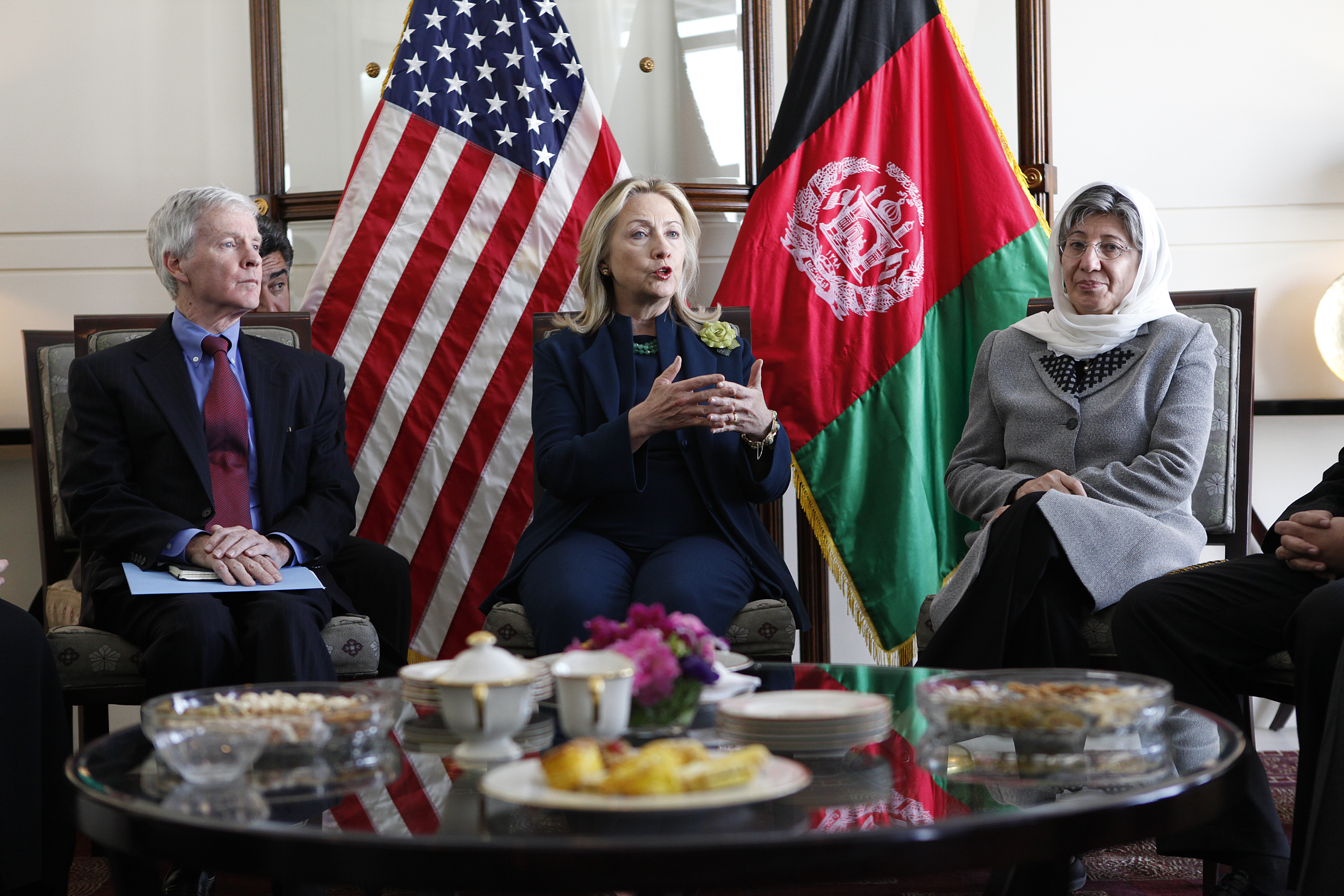
U.S. Secretary of State Hillary Clinton and Ambassador Ryan Crocker with Sima Samar inside the American Embassy in Kabul.

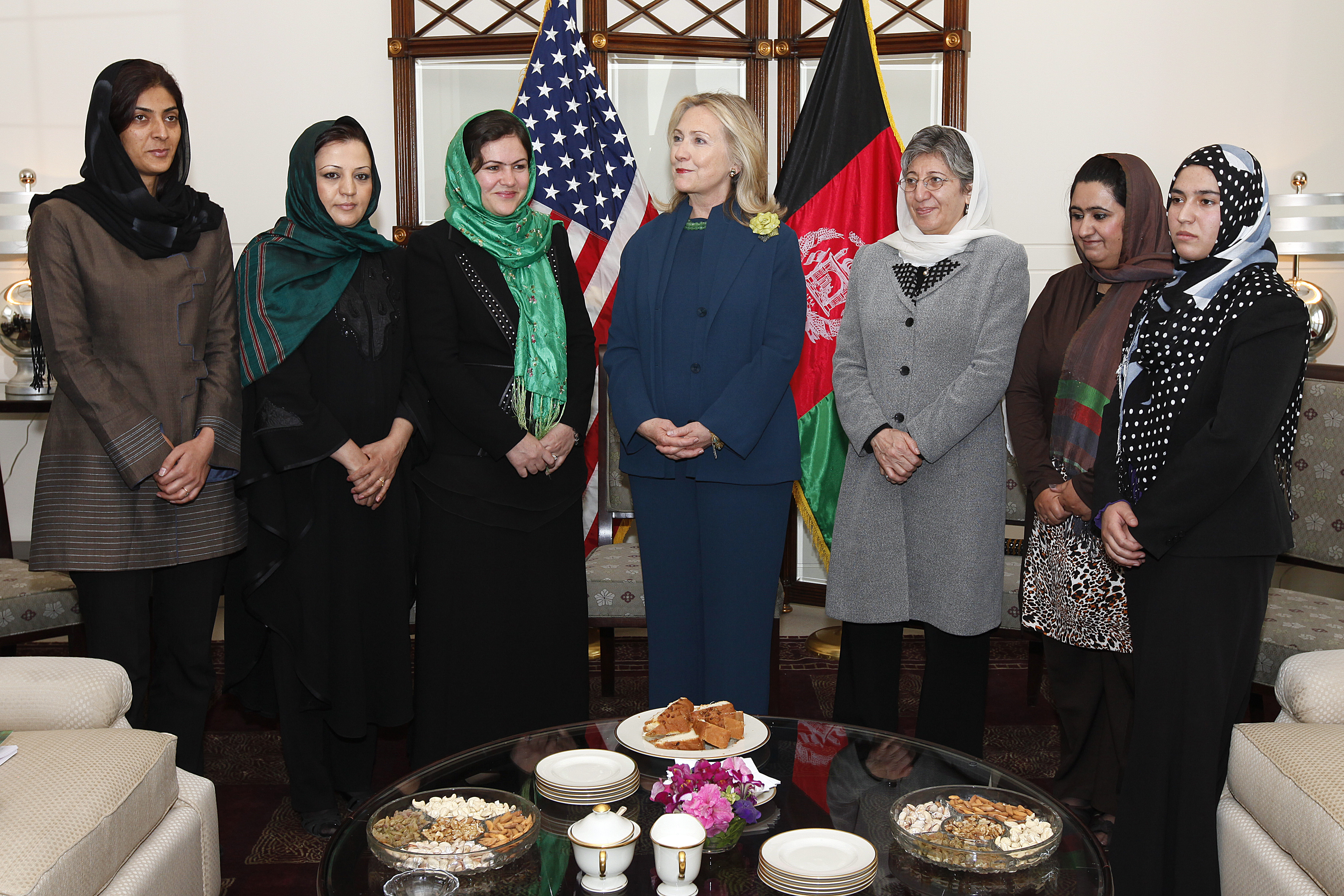
Hillary Clinton with Sima Samar and other female politicians of Afghanistan in Kabul, October 2011

Sima Samar (Dari: سیما سمر; born 3 February 1957) is a human rights advocate, activist and medical doctor within national and international forums, who served as Vice President of Afghanistan in the interim government of Hamid Karzai Minister for Women's Affairs from December 2001 to 2003.

She is the former Chairperson of the Afghan Independent Human Rights Commission (AIHRC) and, from 2005 to 2009, United Nations Special Rapporteur on the situation of human rights in Sudan. In 2012, she was awarded the Right Livelihood Award for "her longstanding and courageous dedication to human rights, especially the rights of women, in one of the most complex and dangerous regions in the world."

== Early life and education ==
Samar was born on 3 February 1957 in Jaghori, in the Ghazni Province of Afghanistan. She belongs to the ethnic Hazara. She obtained a degree in medicine in February 1982 at Kabul University. She practiced medicine at a government hospital in Kabul, but after a few months was forced to flee for her safety to her native Jaghori, where she provided medical treatment to patients throughout the remote areas of central Afghanistan. She has also remained the head of the human rights commission in Afghanistan.

== Career ==
In 1984, the government of the Democratic Republic of Afghanistan arrested her husband, and Samar and her young son fled to neighboring Pakistan. She then worked as a doctor at the refugee branch of the Mission Hospital. Distressed by the total lack of healthcare facilities for Afghan refugee women, she established in 1989 the Shuhada Organization and Shuhada Clinic in Quetta, Pakistan. The Shuhada Organization was dedicated to the provision of healthcare to Afghan women and girls, training of medical staff and education. In the following years, further branches of the clinic/hospital were opened throughout Afghanistan.

=== Political career ===
After living as a refugee for over a decade, Samar returned to Afghanistan in 2002 to assume a cabinet post in the Afghan Transitional Administration led by Hamid Karzai. In the interim government, she served as Deputy President and then as Minister for Women's Affairs. She was the 6th woman to become Cabinet Minister in Afghanistan, the first Minister for Women's Affairs since Shafiqa Ziaie in the 1970s, and the first woman to become minister since 1992.

She was forced into resignation from her post after she was threatened with death and harassed for questioning conservative Islamic laws, especially sharia law, during an interview in Canada with a Persian-language newspaper. During the 2003 Loya Jirga, several religious conservatives took out an advertisement in a local newspaper calling Samar the Salman Rushdie of Afghanistan.

Samar headed the Afghanistan Independent Human Rights Commission (AIHRC) from 2002 - 2019. She also established Gawharshad Institute of Higher Education in 2010, which has attracted more than 1200 students in a very short amount of its activities. In 2019, United Nations Secretary-General António Guterres appointed Samar as one of eight members of the High-Level Panel on Internal Displacement under the leadership of Federica Mogherini and Donald Kaberuka.

Samar publicly refuses to accept that women must be kept in purdah (secluded from the public) and speaks out against the practice of wearing the burqa (head-to-foot wrap), which was enforced first by the fundamentalist mujahideen and then by the Taliban. She also has drawn attention to the fact that many women in Afghanistan suffer from osteomalacia, a softening of the bones, due to an inadequate diet. Wearing the burqa reduces exposure to sunlight and aggravates the situation for women suffering from osteomalacia.

== Recognition ==
Samar is one of the four main subjects in Sally Armstrong's 2004 documentary Daughters of Afghanistan. In the documentary, Sima Samar's work as the Minister of Women's Affairs and her subsequent fall from power is shown.

Samar has received numerous international awards for her work on human rights and democracy, including:

- 1994 Ramon Magsaysay Award for Community Leadership;
- 1995 Global Leader for Tomorrow from the World Economic Forum in Switzerland;
- The 1998 100 Heroines Award in the United States;
- The Paul Grüninger Human Rights Award, Paul Grüninger Foundation, Switzerland March 2001;
- The Voices of Courage Award, Women's Commission for Refugee Women and Children, New York, June 2001;
- The John Humphrey Freedom Award, Rights & Democracy, Canada 2001;
- Ms. magazine, Women of the Year on behalf of Afghan Women, USA December 2001;
- Women of the Month, Toronto, Canada, December 2001;
- Best Social Worker Award, Mailo Trust Foundation, Quetta, Pakistan March 2001;
- International Human Rights Award, International Human Rights Law Group, Washington, DC April 2002;
- Freedom Award, Women's Association for Freedom and Democracy, Barcelona July 2002;
- Lawyers Committee for Human Rights, New York October 2002;
- The Perdita Huston Human Rights Award 2003;
- Profile in Courage Award 2004; and
- Peace Prize of the City of Ieper (Ypres) Belgium, 2008
- Asia Democracy and Human Rights Award, December 2008
- Honorary Officer of the Order of Canada, 2009
- Geuzenpenning, 2011
- Right Livelihood Award, 2012
- Mother Teresa Awards for Social Justice in November 2012.
- Honorary Doctorate from Salem State University in May 2013
- 2013 Allard Prize for International Integrity, Finalist award of CDN$25,000

== See Also ==
- Nigara Mirdad
- Aisha Khurram
- Yahya Qanie

== Notes ==
Government offices
Preceded by None	Minister of Women's Affairs of Afghanistan; December 2001 – 2003	Succeeded by Habiba Sarabi
