= Aisha Khurram =

Afghan Human right activist

Representative of Afghan youth to the United Nations
- In office 8 Feb 2019 – 10 Feb 2020
- Appointed by: Tadamichi Yamamoto
- Preceded by: Ramiz Bakhtiar

Personal details
- Born: 23 July 1999 (age 27) Kabul city, Afghanistan
- Education: Kabul University; Bard College Berlin
- Occupation: Lawyer

Aisha Khurram (Dari: عایشه خرم, born in 1999 in Kabul) is an Afghan-born human right activists, particularly advocating for women's rights in Afghanistan. In 2019, she was selected among eighty nominees as the youth representative of Afghanistan to the United Nations in a free competition

In an interview with Tolo News, she said: "My red lines are not only the women who are benefiting from education in urban areas but also the women living under Taliban rule in provinces and those who do not even think of education."

In 2023, she co-founded E-Learning in Afghanistan, which enabled numerous Afghan girls to pursue their education.

She actively participates in advocating for human rights, particularly women's rights, and has collaborated with various human rights organizations for several years.

== E-learning in Afghanistan ==
Following the collapse of the Afghan government in 2021, restrictions on education for women and girls intensified. This prohibition prompted Khurram and other Afghan women to seek ways to escape and pursue education in other countries. Khurram, after a perilous journey from Afghanistan to Germany, encountered challenges in continuing her education. Collaborating with Lika Torikashvili, they initiated a program called "E-learning in Afghanistan." This program engaged Afghan students and representatives from various universities, supported by financial assistance from UNESCO and other organizations, to provide educational opportunities for Afghan girls. Besides offering education, this program demonstrated the vital role of technology can play in addressing educational challenges in crisis situations.

== See also ==
- Sima Samar
- Tadamichi Yamamoto
- Nigara Mirdad
- Natiq Malikzada
