= Nigara Mirdad =

Afghan Diplomat

- نگاره میرداد

Founder of Afghanistan's Women's Diplomatic Network
- In office 2021–Now

Chargé d'Affaires and Deputy Head of Mission of the Islamic Republic of Afghanistan to Poland
- In office 2020–2025
- President: Ashraf Ghani

Deputy Director General of Third Political Department in Ministry of Foreign Affairs
- In office 2016–2020
- President: Ashraf Ghani

Represented Islamic Republic of Afghanistan in Afghanistan Permanent Mission at UN-Geneva
- In office 2015–2016
- President: Ashraf Ghani

Represented Islamic Republic of Afghanistan in Paris-France
- In office 2013–2015
- President: Hemid Karzai

Personal details
- Born: November 22, 1987 (age 38) Bazarak, Panjshir, Islamic State of Afghanistan
- Occupation: Diplomat
- Nickname: Nigara Mirdad

Nigara Mirdad (also known as Nigara Mirdad Omar) is an Afghan diplomat, international law expert, and human rights advocate. She is best known for her tenure as the Chargé d'Affaires and Deputy Head of Mission of the Islamic Republic of Afghanistan in Warsaw, Poland. Following the collapse of the Afghan democratic government in August 2021, Mirdad became a prominent exiled voice opposing the Taliban regime and championing women's rights on international platforms.

== Early life and education ==
Mirdad grew up in Afghanistan during a period marked by civil conflict and strict barriers to female education. Despite these obstacles, she pursued higher education in exile before returning to contribute to the reconstruction of her home country. She subsequently specialized in international law and multilateral engagement, preparing for a career in public service.

== Diplomatic career ==
Mirdad spent over 15 years within the diplomatic services of the Islamic Republic of Afghanistan. Her career spanned a decade and a half of bilateral and multilateral engagement on behalf of the democratic government.

=== Mission to Poland and the 2021 Collapse ===
Prior to August 2021, Mirdad was stationed in Poland, serving as Counsellor and Deputy Head of Mission at the Embassy of Afghanistan in Warsaw. When Kabul fell to the Taliban on August 15, 2021, Mirdad was on an official mission abroad.

In the wake of the government's collapse, Mirdad and her colleagues refused to yield control of the diplomatic mission to the Taliban. Instead, they joined the Coordination Council of Ambassadors and General Consulates of the Islamic Republic of Afghanistan. Under her leadership as Deputy Ambassador, the embassy continued to operate under the tricolor flag of the republic, providing essential consular services to the Afghan diaspora and refugees with the implicit backing of the Polish government.

=== 2024 Taliban Disavowal ===
In August 2024, the Taliban's Ministry of Foreign Affairs issued a formal statement disavowing 13 Afghan diplomatic missions located in Europe, Canada, and Australia, declaring that passports and documents issued by these embassies would no longer be recognized. Mirdad publicly defended the legal legitimacy of the exile missions, reassuring the public that consular services would continue uninterrupted in compliance with international law and host-country frameworks.

== Human rights and international advocacy ==
Following her exile, Mirdad transitioned into a prominent human rights defender, focusing on international accountability for systemic abuses in Afghanistan.

=== United Nations and European Parliament Engagement ===
Mirdad has regularly engaged with multilateral bodies to advocate for the democratic opposition of Afghanistan. In September 2022, she delivered a speech at the United Nations in Geneva regarding the unfolding humanitarian crisis. In early 2026, she held high-level meetings with members of the European Parliament, urging the international community to sustain economic sanctions against the Taliban and refuse them formal recognition.

=== Gender Apartheid Campaigns ===
Mirdad is heavily involved in global legal networks working to codify the Taliban's oppression of women as "gender apartheid" under international law. Alongside groups like the Afghan Women's Diplomatic Network and organizations such as Humanity United, she has presented testimonies detailing how the erasure of women from education and public life constitutes a deliberate, structural mechanism of state repression.

== See also ==
- Natiq Malikzada
- Aisha Khurram
- Yahya Qanie
