= GIHE =

GIHE may refer to:

- Gawharshad institute of higher education
- Glion Institute of Higher Education
