= Mohammad Alam Izdyar =

Mohammad Alam Ezedyar

First Deputy Speaker of the House of Elders
- Incumbent
- Assumed office 29 January 2011

Member of the House of Elders
- Constituency: Panjshir

Personal details
- Born: 1965 (age 60–61) Parande village, Bazarak District, Panjshir Province

Alhaj Mohammad Alam Ezedyar was selected to represent Panjshir Province in Afghanistan's Meshrano Jirga, the upper house of its National Legislature, in 2005. He has a B.A. in Political Science. He is the Secretary of the Legislature's International Relations Committee. He is a supporter of Abdullah Abdullah.

His son Salem was killed on June 2, 2017 when police reportedly shot at protesters near the presidential palace in Kabul.

His son Salem tore down president Karzai's poster from the Loya Jirga hall and is being accused of damaging public property.
