= Surobi, Kabul =

Surobi سروبي
- Location in Afghanistan
- Coordinates: 34°35′23″N 69°45′45″E
- Country: Afghanistan
- Province: Kabul Province
- District: Surobi District
- Elevation: 3,274 ft (998 m)
- Time zone: UTC+4:30

Surobi (Note: Pashto: سروبی, romanized: Surobai [su.ɾo.bäɪ]; Dari: سروبی, romanized: Surōbī [sʊ.ɾoː.bíː]) is a town and the center of Surobi District in Kabul Province, Afghanistan, located at the junction of the Kabul River and Panjshir River. Surobi is located on 34.5897°N 69.7625°E at 998 m altitude between Kabul and Jalalabad. The population was more than 22,000 people in 2007.

It was the Hezbi Islami's stronghold from 1987 to 1995. A Hezb-e-Islami commander called Faryadi Zardad had his headquarters there and tortured people. He was later prosecuted in London for his crimes. Surobi was the only district in Kabul province not to be part of ISAF's security transition.

== Gallery ==
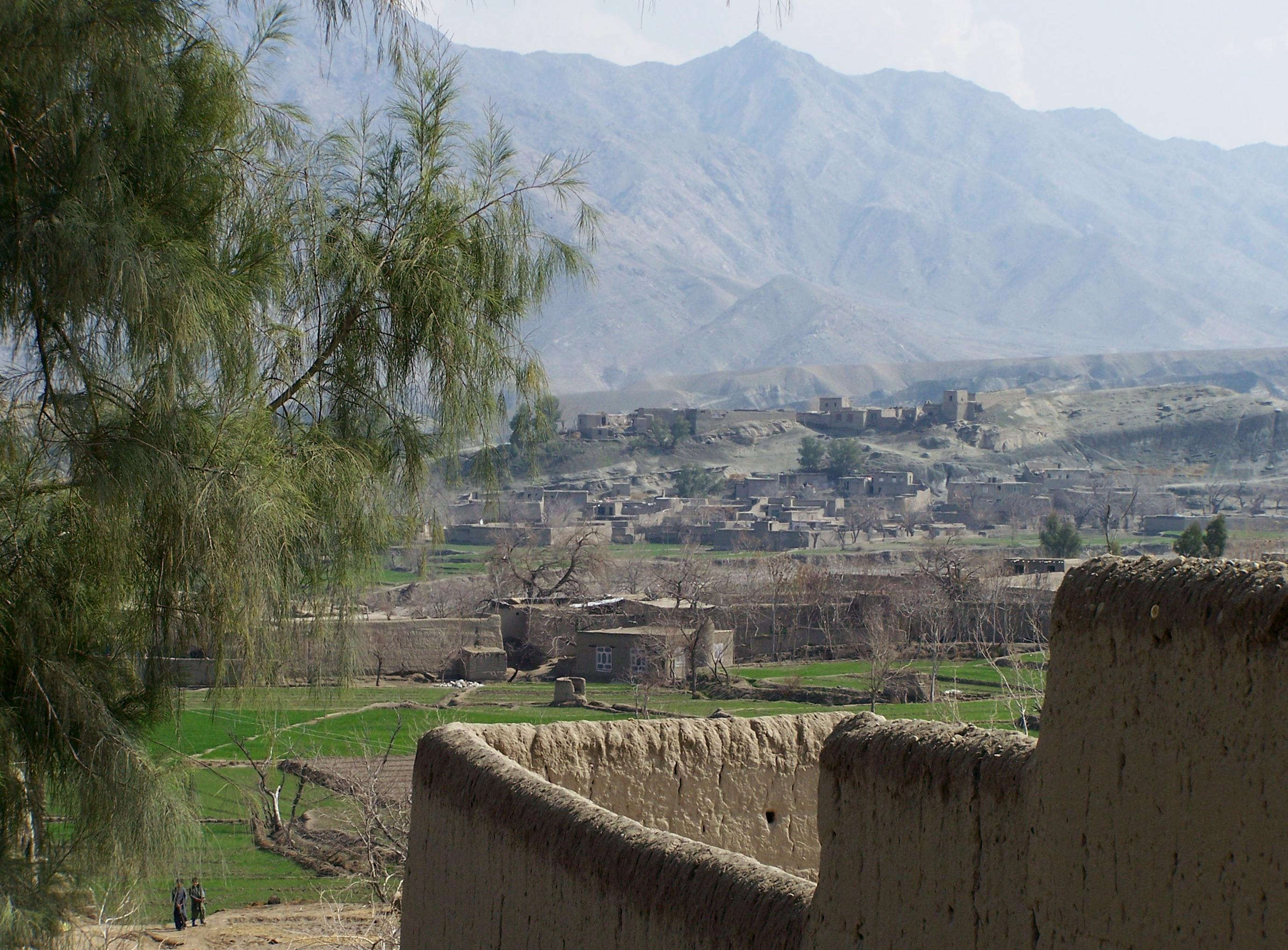

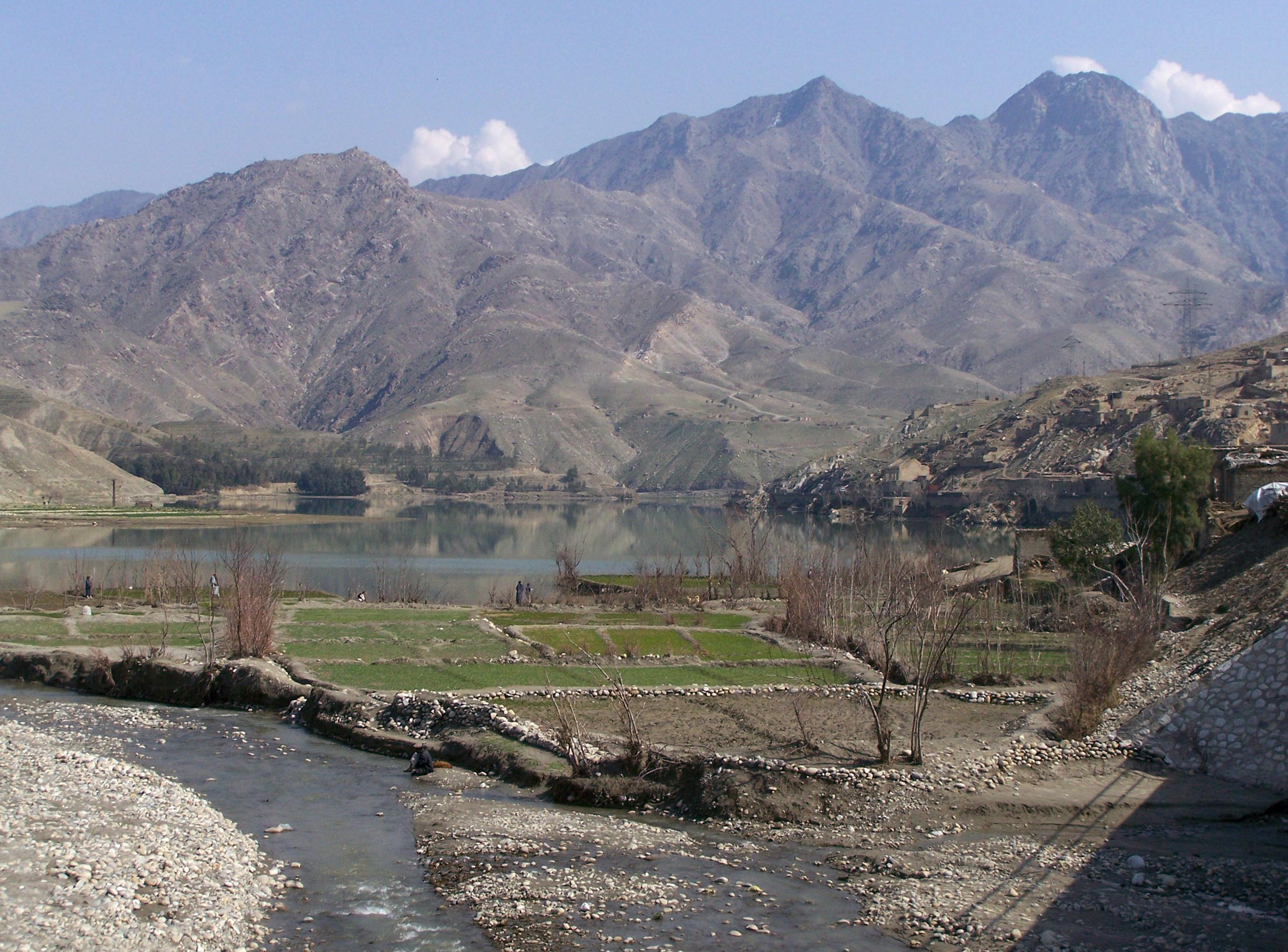
Kabul River

== See also ==
- Kabul Province
