= Anjuman Pass =

Mountain push in Afghanistan

Coordinates: 36°.95942′N 70°.41119′E

The Anjuman Pass (Note: Pashto: د انجمن کوتل Dari: كتل انجمن) (also written Anjoman Pass) (4,430 m) is a mountain pass in the Hindu Kush in Afghanistan. It connects the Panjshir Valley and beyond in the south-west with Badakhshan province and beyond to the north-east, which is the most north-easterly province of Afghanistan. The Anjuman Pass is located on Panjshir Province's border with Badakhshan and Takhar province. The climate in this area is usually cold with snow. The roads are narrow and slippery.
