= Ghorband District =

Ghorband غوربند
- District
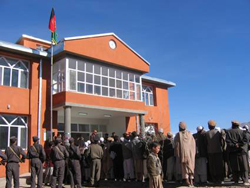
- Ghorband District courthouse in 2005

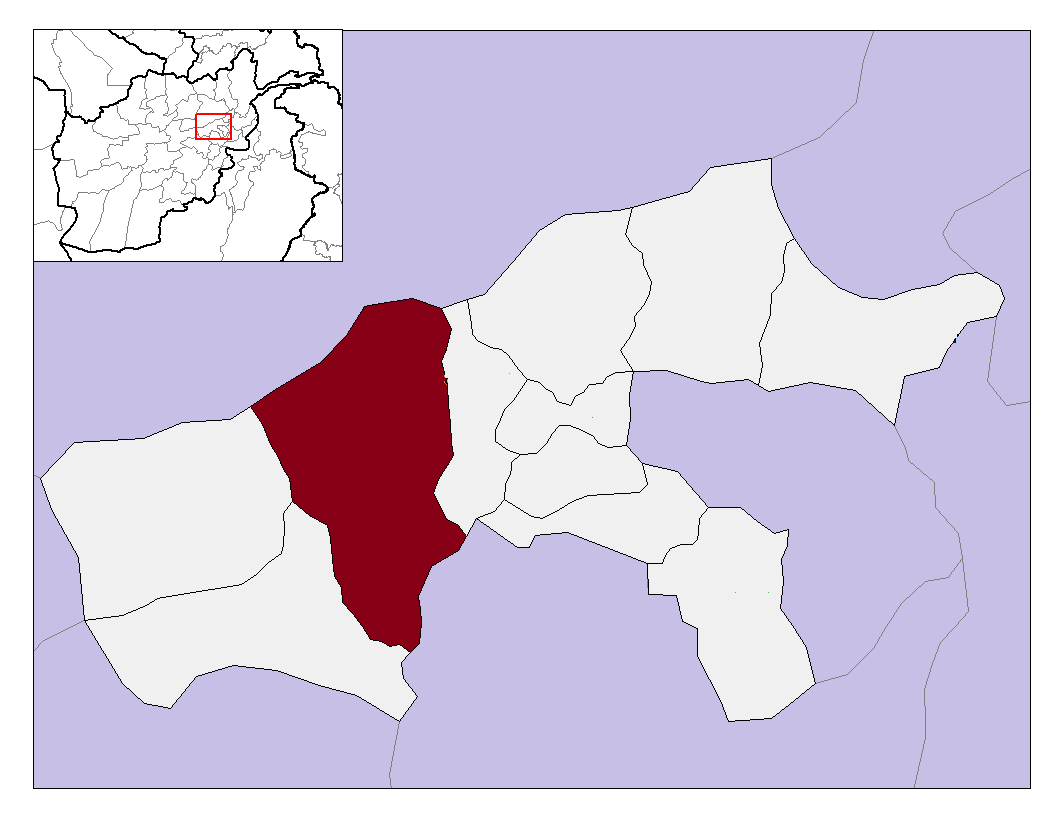
- District highlighted within Parwan Province and Afghanistan
- Coordinates: 35°0′N 68°51′E
- Country: Afghanistan
- Province: Parwan
- No. of Community Development Councils: 58
- No. of villages: 109
- Capital: Syagerd

Area
  - Total: 899 km^{2} (347 sq mi)

Population (2003)
  - Total: 74,123
- Time zone: UTC+4:30 (AFT)

Ghorband (Pashto: غوربند Dari: غوربند), also known as Syagird after its main town, is a district of Parwan province, Afghanistan. It is located in the southern foothills of the Hindu Kush and forms the western boundary of the ancient valley of Koh Daman. The capital of Ghorband is the town of Syagird, about a two-hour drive from Kabul.

Ghorband is the largest district of the province, covering an area of 899 square kilometres with a population of 74,123 as of 2003.

The Ghorband River flows through the district. It contains 58 Community Development Councils and 109 villages. Eventually, Ghorband valley was once much bigger than today reaching to the east Shibar, Doshi and Kahmard districts in Bamyan and Baghlan provinces.

== History ==
Historically, the Ghorband River valley was connected with Bactria as far back as Alexander the Great times. The ancient Koh Daman valley is an important archaeological site and evidence has revealed that the people inhabiting the valley developed sophisticated mining techniques early on.

In November 2007, a team of facilitators from the National Area-Based Development Programme (NABDP) of the Ministry of Rural Rehabilitation and Development (MRRD) and United Nations Development Programme (UNDP) assessed the district and drew up development plans. The Taliban have been active in the district. In November 2010 it was reported that two Iranian intelligence agents arrived in Syagird town in Ghorband District and were accused by the US of helping the insurgents attack coalition forces.

After the end of the three-day Eid ceasefire announced by the Taliban, which lasted from 24 to 26 May 2020, the Taliban attacked a checkpoint in Ghorband District late in the night of 27 May. This was the first deadly attack by the Taliban after the ceasefire in the country. They set fire to the checkpoint, which killed five Afghan troops, and shot dead two others. One other soldier was injured in the attack and two others were held captive, while one Taliban attacker was also killed.

== Economy ==
Main crops grown are almonds, apples, apricots, walnuts, mulberries, grapes, peaches, pears and other like these. Iron ore is mined in the district and transported to Charikar in the east to be smelted before arriving in Kabul. British surveyors in the 19th century reported that the district had significant reserves of iron, zinc, sulfur, and coal. A west–east road and then the north–south A76 highway connects the district to Charikar and Kabul.

== See also ==
- Districts of Afghanistan

== Notable people ==
- Mir Ali Gouhar Ghorbandi
- Mohammad Saber Khishki
