= Haidari Wujodi =

Afghan poet and scholar (1939–2020)

- حیدری وجودی
- Born: Ghulam Haidar; 1939; Panjshir Province, Afghanistan
- Died: 10 June 2020 (aged 80–81); Kabul, Afghanistan
- Occupations: Poet, Writer
- Children: 3
- Writing career
- Language: Persian
- Years active: 19??–2020
- Subject: Literature

Ghulam Haidar (1939 – 10 June 2020), known by his pen name as Haidari Wujodi, was an Afghan poet and scholar who primarily wrote mystical and Sufi poetry in Persian language throughout his life. He wrote numerous books, of which fourteen to fifteen were published. He also used to write columns for domestic newspapers focused on literature.

He was born in Panjshir Province of Afghanistan. He did his fifth and sixth grade education from a school in his hometown. He had one son, two daughters and four siblings.

== Biography ==
At fifteen, Haidari went to Kabul, the capital city of Afghanistan where he established his literary associations with Sufi Ashqari at his bookbinding shop. Ashqari later introduced him to a group of poets who used to exchange verses while gathering in his shop. Later, he subsequently joined a public library and started working for earning purposes. During the early 1990s, the Islamic government following the Afghan Soviet withdrawal, offered him a job at an educational foundation where he used to work at periodicals section every day for one hour.

Prior to start writing poetry, he served a six-year military career with the Afghan Army before starting administrative work for the government in 1964? and remained associated with military service for six years, and later was appointed head of the Kabul Library where he served until 2020. After he retired from the literary service at public library, he wrote a letter to former Afghan president Hamid Karzai, requesting to construct doors and walls at a literary workplace and wished to work there for free. The president, however, accepted the offer and also issued a decree granting him permanent pay and retention.

== Death ==
Haidari died of COVID-19 on 10 June 2020, in Kabul, Afghanistan.

== Literary work ==
Key
†	Remarks denote a short description of the work where available.

#	Title (Note: The translation may not be accurate, as it was done from the google translate)	Year	Type/Credited as	Remarks
1	عشق و جوانی (Love and Youth)	1970	Book	—N/a
2	راهنمای منظوم پنجشیر (Panjshir Poem Guide)	1972	Book	—N/a
3	نقش امید (The Role of Hope)	1976	Book	—N/a
4	با لحظه‌های سبز بهار (With Green Moments of Spring)	1985	Book	Its second edition was published in 2009
5	سالی در مدار نور (Year in the Circle of Light)	1987	Book	Second edition was published in 2000
6	سایه معرفت (Shadow of Knowledge)	1996	Book	Sixth edition was published in 2012
7	صور سبز صدا (Evergreen Voices)	—N/a	Book	—N/a
8	ارغنون عشق (Purple love)	1998	Book	Second edition was published in 2008
9	میقات تغزل (Meeqath Sessions) (Note: See Meeqath)	1999	Book	—N/a
10	رباعیات و دوبیتی‌ها (Quartets and couplets)	2000	Book	Second edition was published in 2008
11	غربت مهتاب (Displaced Moonlight)	2003	Book	Second edition was published in 2008
12	لحظه‌هایی در آب و آتش (Moments in Water and Fire)	2004	Book	—N/a
13	آوای کبود (Blue Voice)	2004	Book	—N/a
14	شکوه قامت مقاومت (Glory to the Resistance)	1958	Book	Second edition was published in 2004
15	دیوان حیدری وجودی (Dewan-e-Haidari Wujodi) (Note: (in Hinglish translation)	2015	Book	—N/a
