= Panjshir River =

River in northeast Afghanistan

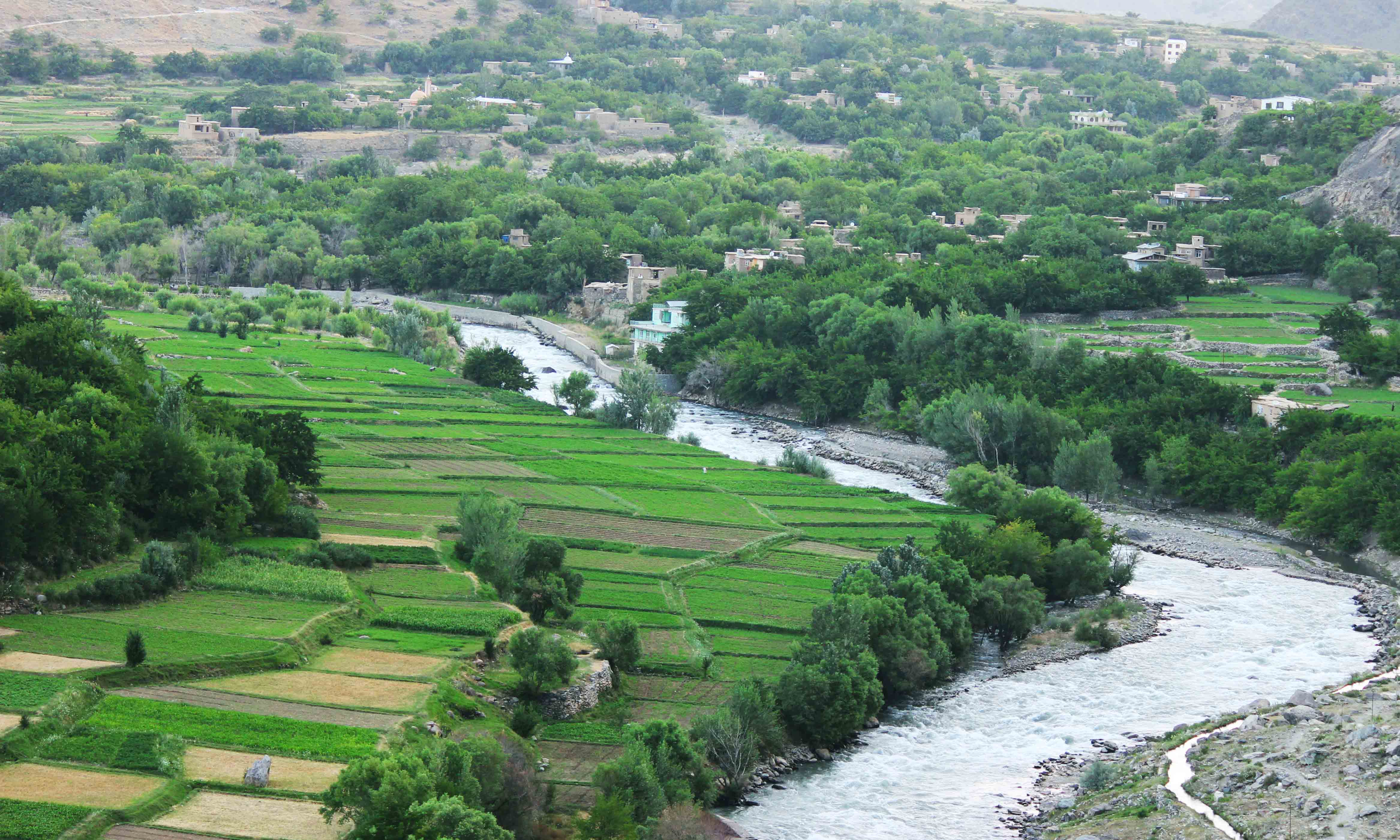
- Panjshir Valley

- Mouth of the Panjshir River in Afghanistan

Location
- Country: Afghanistan
- City: Begram

Physical characteristics
- Source: Hindu Kush Mountains
  - location: Panjshir Valley, Afghanistan
  - coordinates: 35.6882°N 70.0871°E
- Mouth: Kabul River
  - location: Surobi, Kabul Province, Afghanistan
  - coordinates: 34°39′N 69°42′E
- Basin size: 12963.7 sq km

Basin features
- Progression: Kabul→ Indus→ Arabian Sea
- Tributaries
  - right: Ghorband River

The Panjshir River (Note: Pashto: د پنجشېر سیند Dari: رودخانه پنجشیر) flows through the Panjshir Valley in northeastern Afghanistan, 150 kilometres (93 mi) north of Kabul. Its main tributary is the Ghorband River which flows from the Parwan Province and joins the Panjshir River 10 km east of Charikar in Bagram District. The Panjshir River takes its source near the Anjuman Pass, flows southward through the Hindu Kush and joins the Kabul River at Surobi.

Florentia Sale crossed this river during her captivity under Wazir Akbar Khan in 1842 during the First Anglo-Afghan War. A dam was built on the Panjshir River near Surobi in the 1950s to supply water from the Panjshir River to the Kabul River. There is just one permanent bridge on the Panjshir River that provides access to the Bagram Airport. On 12 July 2018, a flood in Panjshir Valley killed ten people.

== See also ==
- Panjshir Province
- Panjshir Valley
