= Bazarak =

Capital of Panjshir Province, Afghanistan

Bazarak بازارک
- Provincial capital
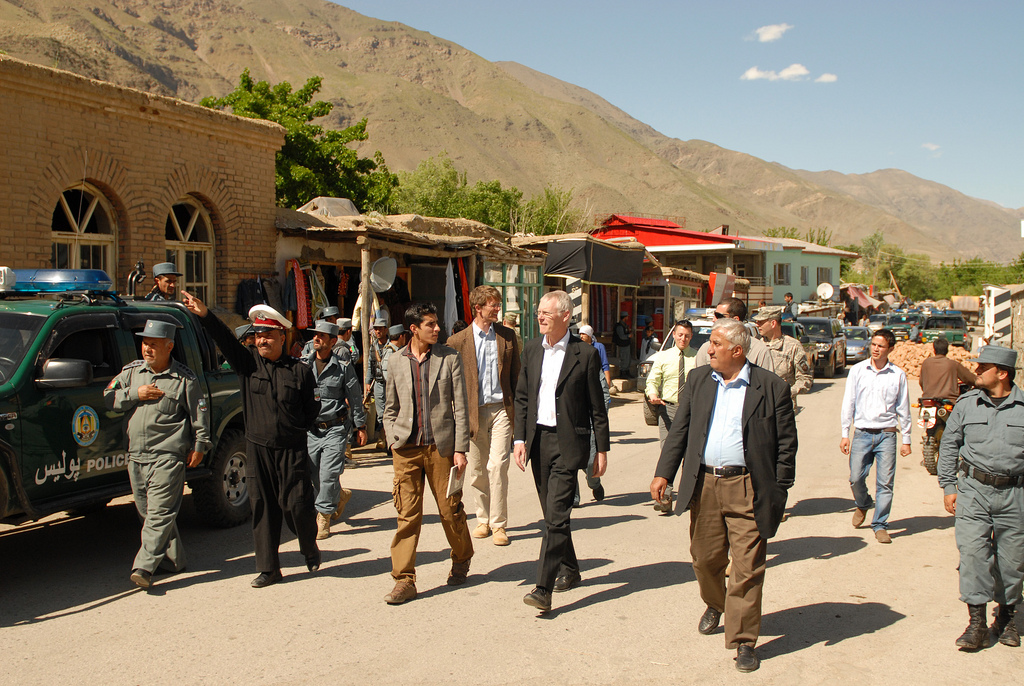
- Americans visiting Bazarak District in 2011

- Location in Afghanistan
- Coordinates: 35°18′46″N 69°30′57″E
- Country: Afghanistan
- Province: Panjshir
- District: Bazarak

Government
  - Type: Municipality
  - Mayor: Rahmatullah Mohammadi

Area
  - Land: 91 km^{2} (35 sq mi)
- Elevation: 1,991 m (6,532 ft)

Population (2025)
  - Provincial capital: 23,167
  - Density: 250/km^{2} (660/sq mi)
  - Rural: 23,167
- Time zone: UTC+04:30 (Afghanistan Time)
- ISO 3166 code: AF-BAZ

Bazarak (Dari (Note: Dari pronunciation: [bɑː.zɑ́ː.ɾǽk]); Pashto (Note: Pashto pronunciation: [bɑ.zɑ.rak]): بازارک) is a town in the northeastern part of Afghanistan, serving as the capital of Panjshir Province. It is within the jurisdiction of Bazarak District and has an estimated population of 23,167 people. Rahmatullah Mohammadi is the current mayor of the town.

Bazarak is home to the mausoleum of Ahmad Shah Massoud, known as the Lion of Panjshir. The town has a number of bazaars, business centers, public parks, banks, hotels, restaurants, mosques, hospitals, universities, and places to play sports or relax. Many tourists visit the town for leisure and pleasure purposes.

Bazarak sits at an elevation of about 1,991 m (6,532 ft) above sea level. It is connected by a road network with Fayzabad in neighboring Badakhshan Province to the northeast, Nuristan Province to the east, and Charikar in Parwan Province to the southwest. Bazarak is administratively divided into three city districts (nahias), covering a land area of 91 km^{2} (35 sq mi) or 9,122 ha (22,540 acres). In 2015 there were 2,747 dwelling units in the town. It comprises six villages, including Khanez, Jangalak, Malaspa, Parandeh and Rahmankhel.

== History ==
Bazarak became the capital of Panjshir Province in 2004. During the Taliban rule of Afghanistan from 1996 to 2001, the Panjshir Valley served as a stronghold for the anti-Taliban Northern Alliance group of former Afghan mujahideen, which was led by Ahmad Shah Massoud.

Following the 2021 Taliban offensive to recapture Afghanistan, Bazarak became the only provincial capital not to fall under Taliban rule, becoming the headquarters of the National Resistance Front of Afghanistan (NRF). However, the Taliban claimed to have captured the city on 5 September 2021. On 6 September 2021, Taliban senior spokesperson Zabiullah Mujahid claimed on Twitter that all of Panjshir Province, including the town of Bazarak, was in Taliban control. Images on social media showed Taliban fighters standing in front of the gate of the Panjshir provincial governor's compound. The Taliban hoisted their flag at a government building there. However, despite reports, the extent of the Taliban's control over Panjshir Province was disputed by the NRF spokesman and foreign relations head Ali Maisam Nazary, who claimed on 9 September 2021 that despite making "tactical" withdrawals from some areas, 60% of the province was still under NRF control. Tasnim News Agency reporters who visited the area on 11 September 2021 also confirmed the presence of not only Taliban fighters in Panjshir but also NRF fighters. Around late October, a subsequent visit by Radio Télévision Suisse and Journeyman Pictures into Bazarak would report an armed confrontation between the Taliban and NRF occurring in an undisclosed location in the mountains surrounding Bazarak, thus confirming that the NRF forces were still active near Bazarak and in Panjshir despite claims of inactivity by local Taliban officials.

== Geography ==
Bazarak is a strategic town in the Panjshir Valley, which is within the Hindu Kush mountain range. The town is connected by a road network with Fayzabad in neighboring Badakhshan Province to the northeast, Nuristan Province to the east, and Charikar in Parwan Province to the southwest.

Bazarak is classified as an urban village. Developed land such as housing, institutions and agriculture is clustered along the Panjshir River. Institutional land accounts for almost 30% of built-up land area, but the large majority of the total land is barren (84%).

=== Climate ===
According to the Köppen climate classification system, Bazarak features a warm-summer humid continental climate (Dsb) with pleasant summers and cold winters. The annual precipitation is distributed mostly in the winter. The average annual temperature is 4.3 °C (40 °F).

Climate data for Bazarak, Panjshir Province
Month	Jan	Feb	Mar	Apr	May	Jun	Jul	Aug	Sep	Oct	Nov	Dec	Year
Mean daily maximum °C (°F)	−3.2 (26.2)	−1.8 (28.8)	2.8 (37.0)	7.7 (45.9)	11.5 (52.7)	17.2 (63.0)	19.3 (66.7)	19.0 (66.2)	16.1 (61.0)	10.8 (51.4)	4.7 (40.5)	−1.3 (29.7)	8.6 (47.4)
Daily mean °C (°F)	−7.6 (18.3)	−5.7 (21.7)	−1.2 (29.8)	3.7 (38.7)	7.3 (45.1)	12.6 (54.7)	14.7 (58.5)	14.2 (57.6)	11.0 (51.8)	6.2 (43.2)	0.5 (32.9)	−4.6 (23.7)	4.3 (39.7)
Mean daily minimum °C (°F)	−12.1 (10.2)	−9.7 (14.5)	−5.2 (22.6)	−0.3 (31.5)	3.2 (37.8)	8.0 (46.4)	10.2 (50.4)	9.5 (49.1)	6.0 (42.8)	1.6 (34.9)	−3.7 (25.3)	−8.0 (17.6)	0.0 (31.9)
Average precipitation mm (inches)	91 (3.6)	125 (4.9)	164 (6.5)	165 (6.5)	101 (4.0)	13 (0.5)	17 (0.7)	15 (0.6)	10 (0.4)	28 (1.1)	54 (2.1)	85 (3.3)	868 (34.2)
Source: weather2visit.com

== Economy ==
Bazarak's economy is based on agriculture, trade, transport, and tourism. The area is famous for sweet mulberries and cherries. Many tourists visit the city every year. At the same time many Panjshiris go to work in Kabul and other Afghan cities.

== Sports ==
Cricket and football are the most popular sports in Afghanistan. The people of Bazarak also enjoy playing other sports such as futsal and volleyball.

== Education ==
There are a number of public and private schools in Bazarak. There are also a number of universities.

== See also ==
- List of cities in Afghanistan
- Tourism in Afghanistan
