= Din Mohammad Jurat =

Afghan Politician

- جنرال جرات
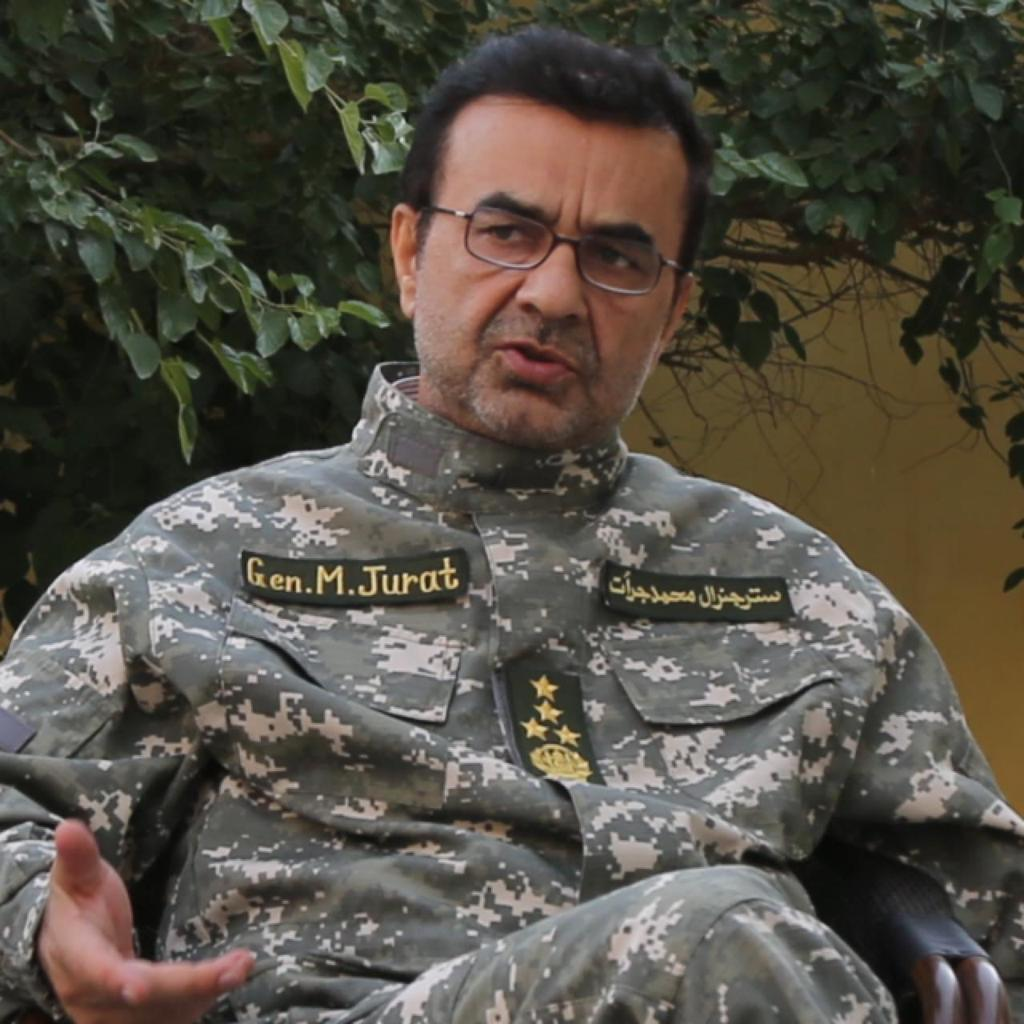

Senior Adviser to the President and Deputy of the National Security council
- In office 2014–2018
- President: Ashraf Ghani

Deputy of Border and Tribal Affairs Ministry
- In office 2008–2010
- President: Hamid Karzai

Personal details
- Born: January 15, 1963 (age 63) Darkhil, Panjshir, Islamic State of Afghanistan
- Party: Protecting the values of Jihad and resistance
- Children: Waheed Jurat
- Occupation: Military 4 Star general
- Nickname: Din Mohammad Jurat

Military service
- Years of service: 46
- Rank: 4 Star General
- Unit: National Directorate of Security (NDS)
- Battles/wars: Soviet–Afghan War, War in Afghanistan (2001–2021)

Din Mohammad Jurat (born January 15, 1963, in Panjshir Province), is a former senior Afghan government official and military general. He held various key security and intelligence positions throughout his career. Jurat was a prominent figure in Afghanistan's National Directorate of Security (NDS) and played a key leadership role within Afghanistan's security and intelligence apparatus, particularly during the pre-Taliban era.

== Early life and education ==
Din Mohammad Jurat, son of Bismellah Jurat, was born on January 15, 1963, in a family from Darkhail Village, Panjshir Province, Afghanistan. Jurat completed his early education at Rokha High School in Panjshir, and after finishing his studies at Abu Hanifa Madrasa in 1365 (Islamic calendar), he enrolled in the Sharia Law Faculty of Kabul University. His time at university coincided with the Saur Revolution in 1978, which marked the rise of the People’s Democratic Party of Afghanistan. This event opposed traditional Afghan values and Islamic principles.

Jurat's father, Qazi Bismillah Jurat, a prominent religious scholar in Panjshir with close ties to influential social and religious circles, was arrested by the Soviet-backed regime in Kabul in the late 1970s and later killed during the political repression. This profoundly affected Jurat and his family. In 1978, Jurat himself was arrested for opposing the regime but was released when the valley was retaken by the Mujahideen. He then joined the resistance, fighting alongside Ahmad Shah Massoud and other leaders against the Soviet occupation until 1987, after which he relocated to Peshawar, Pakistan, to continue his studies.

During his time in Pakistan, Jurat worked on security affairs for the Islamic Party and later served as the head of the Olympic Committee for the Mujahideen-led interim government. This period laid the foundation for his future political and military career, with his return to Afghanistan marking the next phase of his involvement in national security and governance.

== Political activity ==
Din Mohammad Jurat has been involved in various significant political and security roles in Afghanistan. During the Soviet invasion, he was part of the resistance movement, working alongside other Mujahideen under Ahmad Shah Massoud. His early political activities were tied to the Islamic Party, where he contributed to organizing resistance efforts against the Soviet-backed government.

After the fall of the Soviet regime, Jurat transitioned into formal roles within the Afghan government. From 2002 to 2004, he served as the General Chief of Afghanistan Police Forces, playing a role in maintaining internal security during the establishment of the Islamic Republic of Afghanistan. Between 2005 and 2007, he was appointed as the Head of Intelligence at the Ministry of Interior Affairs, overseeing intelligence operations during a critical period of the country's reconstruction.

In 2008, he took on the position of Deputy Minister of Border and Tribal Affairs under the presidency of Hamid Karzai, focusing on managing relationships with border regions and tribal communities. His political influence extended into the 2014 presidential election when he supported Ashraf Ghani, which led to his appointment as Senior Adviser to the President and Deputy of the National Security Council, positions he held until 2018. During this period, he contributed to shaping national security strategies.

Jurat also played a key role in founding the political movement known as Protection of the Values of Jihad and Resistance, which aimed to preserve the influence of the Mujahideen in Afghan politics. Following the Taliban's takeover in 2021, he became one of the leaders of the National Resistance Council to Save the People of Afghanistan, a group formed to oppose Taliban rule and advocate for democratic governance.

== General Jurat's opposition to Ashraf Ghani ==
After Ashraf Ghani dismissed General Jurat from his position, the Afghan government made several attempts to arrest him, but they were unsuccessful. In one suspicious incident in the Nangarhar province, the police announced that they had seized a quantity of explosives from General Jurat's office. In the second incident, the Ministry of Interior raided General Jurat's home in Kabul, seizing dozens of weapons and armored vehicles. However, they still failed to capture Jurat himself.
