= Paryan District =

Paryan پریان
- District
- Location within Afghanistan
- Coordinates: 35.6475°N 70.0433°E
- Country: Afghanistan
- Province: Panjshir
- Time zone: UTC+04:30 (AST)

Paryan District (Dari: ولسوالی پریان) is a district of Panjshir Province, Afghanistan. The estimated population in 2019 was 16,452 and was estimated to increase to 17,033 by 2021.

== See also ==
- Districts of Afghanistan
