= Shotul District =

Shotul شتل
- District
- Location within Afghanistan
- Coordinates: 35.2939°N 69.3028°E
- Country: Afghanistan
- Province: Panjshir
- Time zone: UTC+04:30 (AST)

Shotul District (Dari: ولسوالی شتل) is a district of Panjshir Province, Afghanistan.The estimated population was 12,143 in 2019.

== See also ==
- Districts of Afghanistan
