= Natiq Malikzada =

Afghan journalist and human rights advocate

- ناطق ملک‌زاده
- Born: Mohammad Natiq Malikzada; 1995 or 1996 (age 30–31); Islamic State of Afghanistan
- Education: MA in International Relations (Middle East Studies); LLM in International Human Rights Law
- Alma mater: MA in International Relations
- Occupations: Journalist, human rights researcher, advocate
- Known for: Media freedom and gender justice advocacy, critique of international human rights law, co-founding Better Afghanistan
- Awards: Chevening Scholarship

Natiq Malikzada (also known as Mohammad Natiq Malikzada) is a Tajik-Afghan journalist, human rights researcher, and advocate. His work focuses on media freedom, gender justice, human rights, and accountability for human rights violations across the Middle East and South Asia. He has actively participated in international discussions concerning the political and legal challenges facing the Global South and currently writes a column for the Washington-based magazine The National Interest.

== Education ==
Malikzada holds a Master of Arts (MA) in International Relations with a specialization in Middle East Studies, and a Master of Laws (LLM) in International Human Rights Law. After completing his bachelor's degree in India, he moved to the United Kingdom to pursue his advanced studies after being awarded the prestigious Chevening Scholarship.

== Journalism and research career ==
Malikzada began his career as a journalist, previously working with the Dubai-based news outlet Akhbar Al Aan. He later transitioned to writing columns and geopolitical commentary for a variety of global publications and think tanks. In addition to his regular column in The National Interest, he frequently contributes to The Diplomat, Amu TV, the Atlantic Council, and Responsible Statecraft.

As a researcher, Malikzada serves as a fellow with the Mosaic Global Foundation and the Center for Gulf Human Rights and Democracy. In these roles, he documents human rights violations and war crimes across Afghanistan, the Middle East, and South Asia.

Malikzada frequently appears as a human rights expert and commentator on major international television networks, where he debates global human rights crises and highlights the systemic oppression of marginalized groups.

== Views on international human rights ==
In his academic and public commentary, Malikzada has been highly critical of the structural inequalities embedded within international human rights law. He argues that the current system is inherently biased against the Global South and frequently manipulated by powerful states to serve geopolitical interests.

== Better Afghanistan ==
Malikzada is a co-founder of Better Afghanistan, a civil institution he established alongside the prominent Afghan women's rights activist Freshta Kohistani to counter religious extremism and promote democratic values. Kohistani was assassinated in Afghanistan in December 2020.

Following the 2021 Taliban return to power, Malikzada shifted the organization's focus toward documenting ongoing human rights violations and facilitating clandestine educational support for Afghan girls who were banned from attending school by the regime. This activism drew direct hostility from the Taliban authorities. In 2024, local Afghan media, including Hasht-e Subh (8am Media), reported that four employees of Better Afghanistan had been arrested by Taliban intelligence forces in Kabul.

== Security threats and 2025 attack ==
Due to his outspoken criticism of religious extremism and the Taliban, Malikzada has faced numerous security threats throughout his career. In 2014, while working as a journalist in Afghanistan, he survived an attempted kidnapping. In 2018, he was reportedly taken hostage by Taliban militants.

After relocating to the United Kingdom, Malikzada continued to campaign against the Taliban's policies, particularly their oppression of women. On February 13, 2025, Malikzada was attacked and stabbed by two men in his Home Office asylum accommodation in London. He sustained severe injuries but survived the attack. Hampshire police subsequently arrested two men in connection with the incident, which drew widespread condemnation from media organizations, including the National Union of Journalists (NUJ), who called for better protection for exiled dissidents.

== See also ==
- Ahmad Massoud
- Abdullah Khenjani
- Nigara Mirdad
- yousuf Jan Nesar
