= Rokha District =

Rokha روخه
- District
- Location within Afghanistan
- Coordinates: 35.2561°N 69.4772°E
- Country: Afghanistan
- Province: Panjshir
- Time zone: UTC+04:30 (AST)

Rokha District (Dari: ولسوالی روخه) is a district of Panjshir Province, Afghanistan. The estimated population in 2019 was 25,461.

== See also ==
- Districts of Afghanistan
