= Yousuf Jan Nesar =

Mohammad Yousuf Jan Nesar
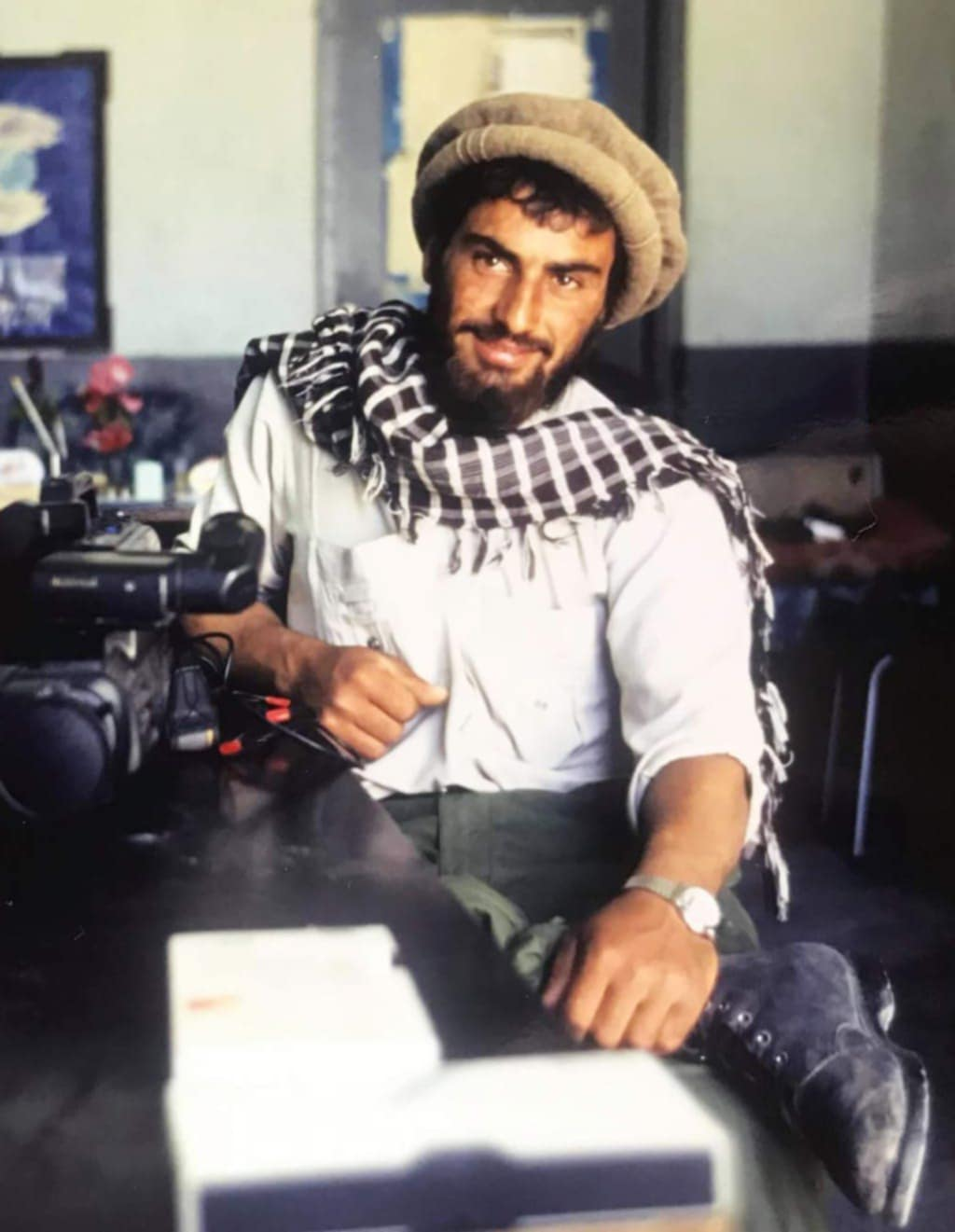
- Mohammad Yousuf Jan Nesar at a media event discussing archival footage
- Born: محمد یوسف جان نثار; 5 January 1970 (age 56); Panjshir, Afghanistan
- Education: Self-taught filmmaker
- Occupations: Cameraman; Producer; Filmmaker
- Years active: 1986–present
- Known for: Archival footage of Ahmad Shah Massoud’s military operations; Northern Alliance War Documentation; Featured in Spy Ops on Netflix
- Spouse: Nouria Jan Nesar
- Children: 8

Mohammad Yousuf Jan Nesar (also known as Yousuf Janisar) is an Afghan-French filmmaker and producer, born in 1970 in the Panjshir province of Afghanistan. From 1986, he served as a military cameraman under the commander Ahmad Shah Massoud during the conflict against the Soviet occupation and later, the Taliban. His documentation work has played a vital role in preserving historical audiovisual archives of Afghanistan's struggles. In August 2021, Nesar and his family were evacuated to France during the Operation Apagan amid the fall of Kabul.

== Biography ==
Yousuf Jan Nesar was born into a farming family in Panjshir but lost his father when he was three. As a teenager, he saved money to buy his first camera. In 1986, he joined Ahmad Shah Massoud’s forces as a military aide, though Massoud initially found him too young for combat. Instead, Nesar was assigned to film operations, strategic movements, and daily life within the Northern Alliance, becoming the “eyes of Massoud” when the commander was absent from the battlefield.

Nesar's footage documented key moments in Afghan history, including battles, reconnaissance missions, and behind-the-scenes footage of the mujahideen resistance. He was entrusted with cataloging and safeguarding the films, which were initially stored in Panjshir, moved to Kabul when the mujahideen took the capital in 1992, and later returned to Panjshir after the Taliban's rise to power in 1996.

After Massoud's assassination in 2001, Nesar collaborated with the National Audiovisual Institute of France (INA) to preserve some of his archives, while keeping the bulk of them hidden at his home in Kabul, known only to his family. As the Taliban threatened to seize Kabul in 2021, Nesar contacted the French embassy to prevent the destruction of his archives. In July 2021, the French Archaeological Delegation discreetly evacuated seven large metal trunks containing 350 VHS tapes, 200 Hi-8 tapes, 3,000 MiniDV tapes, and 25 hard drives—amounting to 5,000 hours of historical footage.

On August 23, 2021, Yousuf Jan Nesar, his wife Nouria, and their eight children (aged 15 to 27) were evacuated from Kabul to Paris with the assistance of the French embassy as part of Operation Apagan.

== Career and contributions ==
Nesar's work has been widely recognized for its historical importance. His archival footage has become part of the INA's “Afghanistan-Massoud Collection,” available through the Mediapro platform for filmmakers and researchers. The Alliance for the Protection of Heritage in Conflict Areas (ALIPH) provided support for the preservation, inventory, and digitization of these archives in 2023, helping Nesar and a team from INA document and catalog the collection.

His work has been featured in several documentaries:

“INAttendu” (France Info, 2021) “Afghanistan: Memory as a Weapon” (France Culture, 2022) “Operation Jawbreaker” (Netflix, 2023), where he appeared as an official cameraman of the Northern Alliance. Nesar's footage also appeared in “Mystères d’archives” (2012) and the History Catchers series, which aired an episode in 2019 dedicated to the death of Ahmad Shah Massoud and Nesar's critical role in documenting it.

== Legacy ==
Through his lens, Nesar captured pivotal moments in Afghan history, preserving them for future generations. His archives have been praised as a historic collection, highlighting the resilience of the Afghan people during decades of war.

== Awards ==
In 2024, Mohammad Yousuf Jan Nesar received the FIAT/IFTA Media Management Award during the FIAT/IFTA World Conference in Bucharest, Romania. The award recognizes projects that improve the preservation, management, and use of audiovisual archives. Nesar was acknowledged for his work in documenting and managing historical footage related to the Northern Alliance and Ahmad Shah Massoud, contributing to the preservation of Afghanistan's audiovisual heritage.
