= Panjshir Valley =

Valley in northeastern Afghanistan

Panjsher Valley
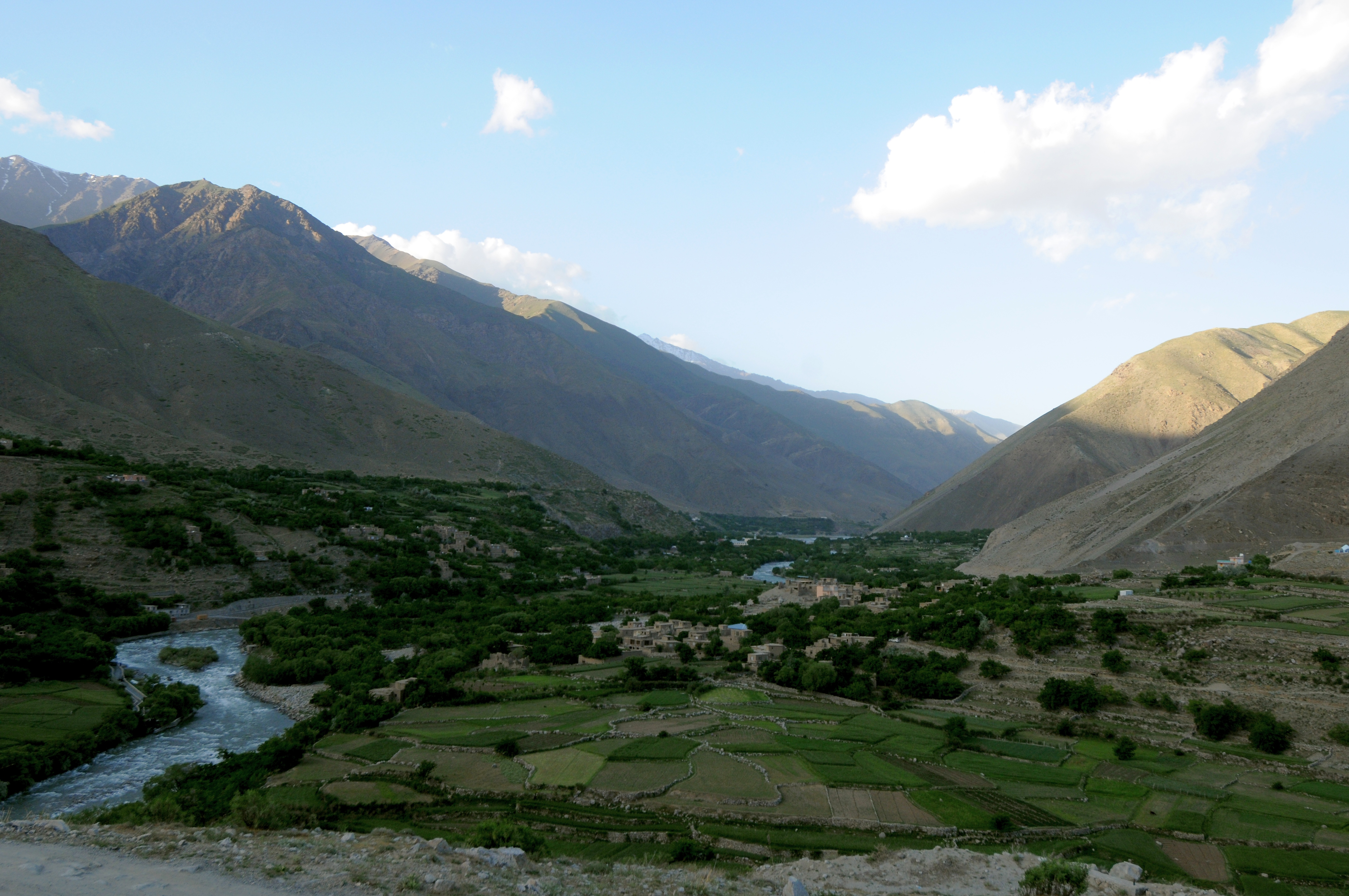
- A view of Afghanistan's Panjshir Valley

- Map of Afghanistan with Panjshir highlighted

Geography
- Coordinates: 35°16′N 69°28′E

The Panjshir Valley (Dari: درهٔ پنجشير, Dara-i-Panjsher, literally "Valley of the Five Lions"), also spelled Panjsher, is a valley in northeastern Afghanistan, 150 kilometres (93 mi) north of Kabul, near the Hindu Kush mountain range. It is divided by the Panjshir River. The valley is home to more than 100,000 people, including Afghanistan's largest concentration of ethnic Tajiks as of 1997. In April 2004, it became the heart of the new Panjshir Province, having previously been part of Parwan Province. Politically, this province has been considered the start point of Afghanistan's Jihad period against the Soviets. This province is also the birthplace of Afghanistan's national hero, Ahmad Shah Massoud.

== History ==
Human activity in Panjshir can be dated to the Bronze Age. The relics from underground archaeological sites had been discovered during President Daoud Khan's presidency. The indigenous people of the valley are believed to be the most ancient living inhabitants in the country.

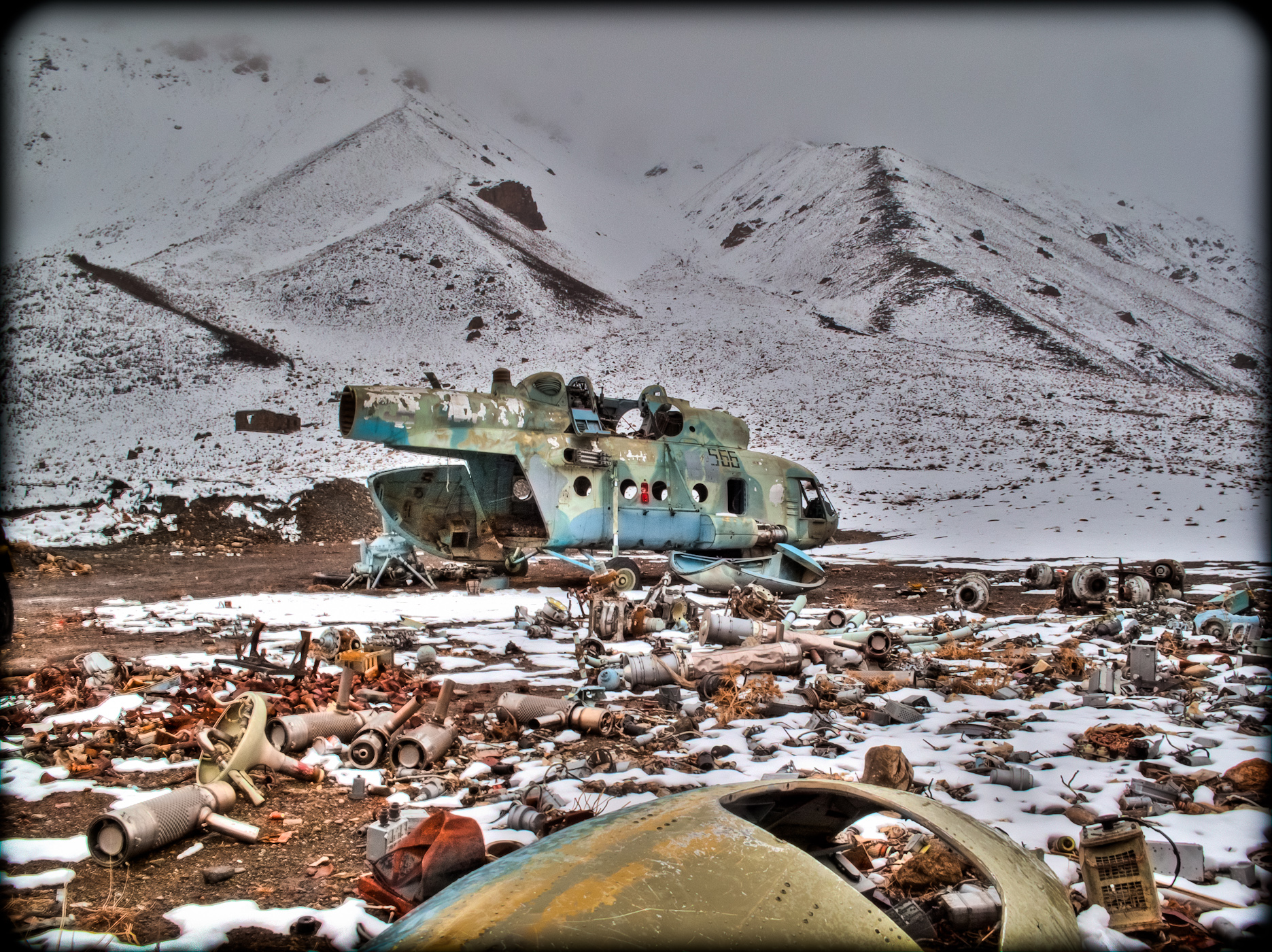
Ruins of a downed Soviet Mi-8 helicopter in Panjshir, 2011

In 1975, the valley was the site of an uprising by Panjshir's residents under the leadership of Ahmad Shah Massoud against the government of Daoud Khan.

It was the site of the Panjshir offensives fought by the Democratic Republic of Afghanistan and the Soviets against the mujahideen during the Soviet–Afghan War from 1980 to 1985, when local commander Ahmad Shah Massoud successfully defended the valley.

The valley again witnessed renewed fighting during the Afghan Civil War of 1996–2001 between the Taliban and the Northern Alliance under the command of Massoud, where he again defended it from being overrun by the Taliban. The Panjshir Valley was considered one of Afghanistan's safest regions during the era of the ISAF-backed government and in late August 2021, warlords tried to make the valley a bastion of resistance to the Taliban in Afghanistan. The Taliban announced that hundreds of fighters were headed towards the valley on 22 August 2021.

Former Vice President Amrullah Saleh and Ahmad Massoud, son of former anti-Soviet Mujahideen commander Ahmad Shah Massoud, have vowed to resist the Taliban from Panjshir, which repelled both Soviet forces and the Taliban in the 1980s and 1990s. The Alliance has claimed to "Retake Districts in Northeast Afghanistan" on 22 August led by former military, special forces, police and more. The Biden administration has not publicly answered the plea made by Ahmad Massoud in an op-ed in The Washington Post for help restocking the anti-Taliban forces with supplies. On 25 August 2021, it was revealed that a delegation of Panjshir resistance forces in the nearby Parwan city of Charikar were holding talks with a Taliban delegation and that the Taliban by this point ceased blocking routes to the Panjshir Valley "after one or a maximum of two days." On 6 September 2021, Taliban claims to have overtaken the insurgents holding out in Panjshir Valley and killed Fahim Dashty, spokesperson of Ahmad Massoud's resistance front However, Resistance fighters were still confirmed to be present in the Panjshir Valley.

On 9 September 2021, Ali Maisam Nazary, the Resistance's foreign relations head, denied reports of full Taliban control of the Panjshir province, stating that 60% was still under National Resistance Front control. Claims of full Taliban control were further refuted when reporters from Iran's Tasnim News Agency were able to visit the Valley on 11 September and interview not only a Taliban fighter but also a local NRF fighter stationed in the area. Despite Taliban claims of calm in the Valley, Tasnim News Agency also reported that some local residents were fleeing in anticipation of future military clashes. In an interview which was published on 21 September 2021, Ahmad Wali Massoud told TRT World journalist Samuel Ramani that the Resistance still controls much of the Valley and stated that the Taliban, which he described as "leaderless," had a weaker hold than it appeared.

== Economy and natural resources ==
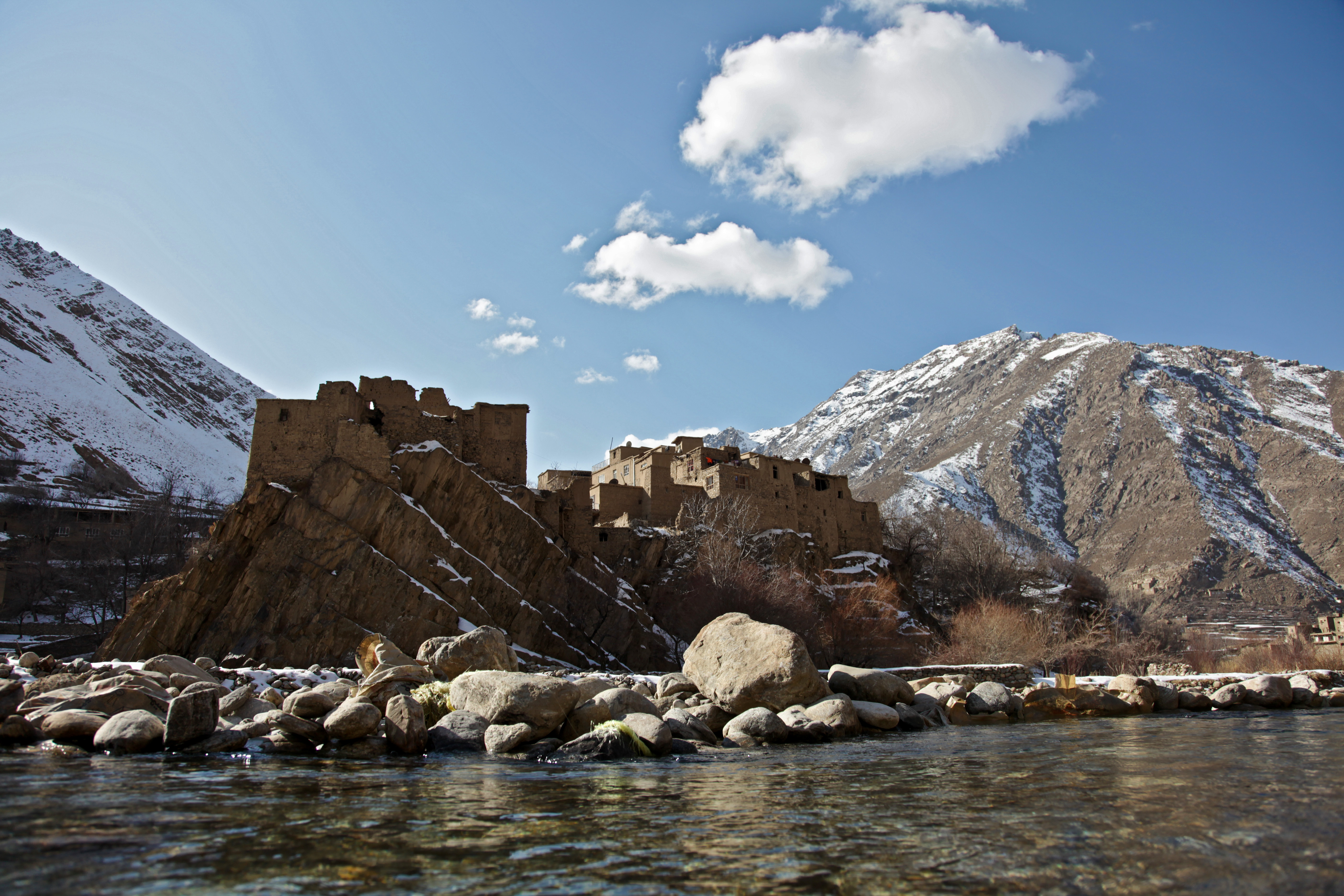
Buildings in the valley in front of the Panjshir River

The Panjshir Valley has the potential to become a major centre of emerald mining. As early as the 1st century AD, Pliny the Elder commented on gemstones from the region. In the Middle Ages, Panjshir was famed for its silver mining and the Saffarids and Samanids minted their coins there. As of 1985, emeralds upwards of 190 carats (38 g) had been found in Panjshir, reported to rival in quality the finest crystals of the Muzo mine in Colombia. American reconstruction efforts in Afghanistan sparked a development boom in the valley with the construction of new modern roads and a new radio tower that allows valley residents to pick up radio signals from the Afghan capital, Kabul. The valley has the potential of being an energy hub for Afghanistan, through construction of several hydroelectric dams. Rewat locality could be the site of the first dam. The valley could make the capital region power self-reliant.

The Panjshir Valley has always been an important highway. Nearly 100 kilometres (62 mi) long, it leads to two passes over the Hindu Kush – the Khawak Pass (3,848 m) leading to Afghanistan's northern plains, and the Anjuman Pass (4,430 m) that crosses into Badakhshan – used by the armies of Alexander the Great and Timur.

A 10-turbine wind farm was built in Panjshir Valley in April 2008.
