= Gawharshad University =

University in Kabul, Afghanistan

Gawharshad University (GU)
- Universität Gawharshad
- Motto: Competency and Leadership
- Type: Private
- Established: 2010
- Students: 2800
- Location: Kabul, Afghanistan
- Website: gawharshad.edu.af

Gawharshad University (GU) is an institution of higher education in Kabul, Afghanistan.

== History ==
After the overthrow of the Taliban regime in 2001, the people and government of Afghanistan started reconstruction and rebuilding different sectors, including higher education. According to government policy, private sectors are allowed to participate in different sections including higher education. More than 80 private universities are active in Kabul and many other provinces such as Mazar-e-Sharif, Herat, Jalalabad, Qandahar, and Ghazni. Gawharshad University is the most successful and well known one, and its activities are under the Afghan Ministry of Higher Education. GU was established as a small non-profit private University in 2010 by Sima Samar; the current head of Afghanistan Independent Human Rights Commission (AIHRC).

== Board of trustees ==
- Dr. Sima Samar, former vice president and former Minister of Women Affairs and the current head of Afghanistan Independent Human Rights Commission (AIHRC)
- Dr. Ashraf Ghani Ahmadzai, the former Finance Minister, and the current President of Afghanistan
- Dr. Dadfar Spanta, the former Foreign Affairs Minister, and the present Head of National Security Council
- Dr. Azam Dadfar, the former Ministry of Higher Education
- Dr. Ehsan Zia, the former Rural Rehabilitation and development Minister
- Dr. Zaher Fahimi, the current professor of Shahed Rabeni (Education Pedagogy) University
- Professor Hamid Layan
- Professor Azam Banwal
- Dr. Alama
- Dr. Mohammad Ibrahim Atmer a bussnissman in Afghanistan.

== Faculties ==
GU has four faculties: the first is the Faculty of Law and Political Science, which combines two separate departments, Law and Political Science; the second is Faculty of Economic Management that also has two departments; department BA and Economics Management. The third is Civil Eng. and the fourth is Computer Science, which combines two departments, Information Technology and Software Eng. More than 1600 students are studying in Gawharshad and nearly 35% of them are women. All courses in Gawharshad are offered in two times; morning and evening. According to the rules of the Higher Education Ministry, every student can choose between 17 credits and 21 credits in every term. According to this program, the total time needed for graduation is about four years. Gawharshad has planned to develop the faculties and departments.

== Instructors and curriculum ==
All lecturers who are teaching in GU are experienced instructors; they have obtained their master's or doctorates from the US, Europe, South and Central Asia, and the Middle East countries. Almost 100 lecturers are working with GU, including almost 25 full-time and 75 part-time lecturers. Gawharshad has an international credit-based educational standards and curriculum. GU has a platform which works on curriculum towards the country's needs and is based on international standards.

== Women empowerment center ==
As a non-profit university with a social advancement focus, one of the most important goals of its establishment was providing a good condition for women and girls, particularly those who are unable to pay their education fees, but they are interested in higher education. In order to obtain this goal, Gawharshad has founded a special center called women empowerment center. This center has made a good communications with many internal and external donors to receive funds and support poor and motivated women. Up to now more than 100 women have received scholarships.

== Research unit ==
GU has provided a unit for developing research methods on different issues. This unit has plans to conduct some research particularly for preparing the university's textbooks. In addition this unit has provided for debate and dialogues by organizing regular seminars, public lectures and conferences.
