= Ghorband River =

Ghorband River د غوربند سیند رودخانه غوربند
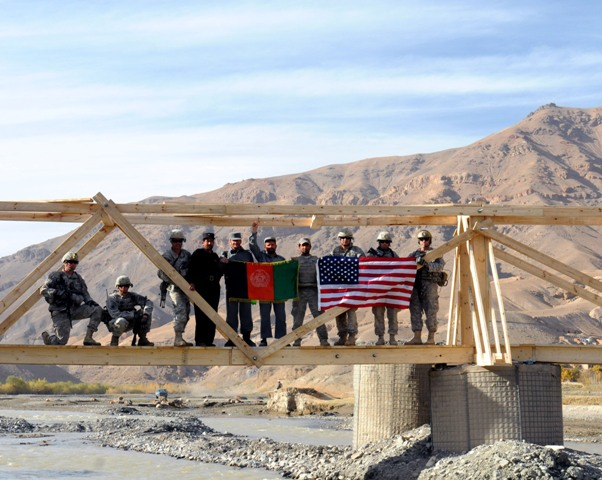

- Location within Afghanistan

Location
- Country: Afghanistan
- Province: Parwan
- District: Ghorband

The Ghorband River (Note: Pashto: د غوربند سیند Dari: رودخانه غوربند) is a river in Afghanistan, flowing through Parwan Province. It is a tributary of the Panjshir River, then a sub-tributary of the Indus River, then the Kabul River.

The Ghorband runs entirely in Parwan province, where it gives its name to the Ghorband District. It originates in the eastern Shibar Pass (which connects the provinces of Parwan and Bamyan, or watersheds of the Ghorband and Kunduz River) and passes in an eastbound direction which it maintains throughout most of its course. It runs along the south and the imposing central range of the Hindu Kush, receiving meltwater in the Shibar Pass area of Salang. It flows from this in a long valley between the high range of the Hindu Kush in the north and Koh-i-Baba in the south. It then converges with the Panshir River on its right bank, 10 kilometers east of Charikar. It flows through the districts of Sheikh Ali, Shinwari, Ghorband and Surkh Parsa.

The Ghorband receives many tributaries from both left and right, all fed mainly by snowmelt in spring and summer. Its main tributary is the Turkman but the Salang River converges on the left bank, and its valley is an important access route to the pass and towards the northern half of the country. The Salang converges with the Ghorband at the locality of Jabal Saraj.

== See also ==
- List of rivers of Afghanistan
