= Panjshir Province =

Province of Afghanistan

Panjshir پنجشیر
- Province
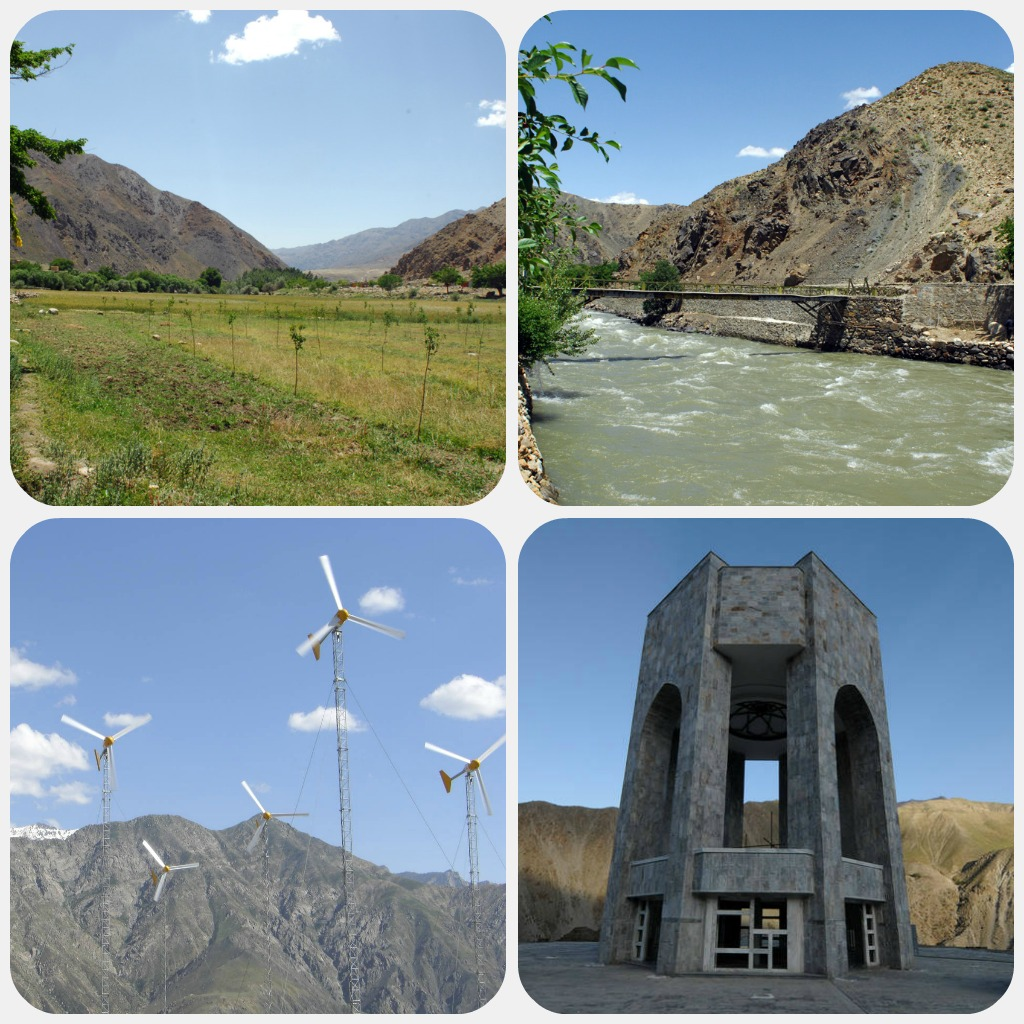
- Clockwise: the Panjshir valley, the Panjshir River, the tomb of Ahmad Shah Massoud, and a Panjshir wind farm

- Map of Afghanistan with Panjshir highlighted
- Coordinates: 35°25′39″N 69°44′06″E
- Country: Afghanistan
- Established: 2004
- Capital: Bazarak

Government
  - Governor: Mohammad Agha Hakim
  - Deputy Governor: Qari Asrar

Area
  - Total: 3,771 km^{2} (1,456 sq mi)

Population (2021)
  - Total: 334,940
  - Density: 88.82/km^{2} (230.0/sq mi)
- Time zone: UTC+04:30 (Afghanistan Time)
- Postal code: 15XX
- ISO 3166 code: AF-PAN
- Main languages: Dari

Panjshir (Note: Pashto: پنجشیرPashto pronunciation: [pand͡ʒ.ʃer] Dari: پنجشیرDari pronunciation: [pʰänd͡ʒ.ʃéːɾ]) (lit. 'five lions') is one of the 34 provinces of Afghanistan, located in the northeastern part of the country containing the Panjshir Valley. The province is divided into seven districts and contains 512 villages. The main inhabitants of the province are Shamali Tajiks, who speak Dari. As of 2021, the population of Panjshir province was about 334,940. Its current governor is Mohammad Agha Hakim.

Panjshir became an independent province from the neighboring Parwan Province in 2004. It is bordered by Baghlan and Takhar in the north, Badakhshan and Nuristan in the east, Laghman and Kapisa in the south, and Parwan in the west.

== History ==
The territory fell to Babur in the early 16th century. It was later conquered by Ahmad Shah Durrani, and officially became part of the Durrani Empire. The rule of the Durranis was followed by that of the Barakzai dynasty. During the 19th century, the region was governed by the Emirate of Afghanistan. Florentia Sale crossed this river during her captivity under Wazir Akbar Khan in 1842 during the First Anglo-Afghan War. Like the rest of Afghanistan, Panjshir became part of the newly established Kingdom of Afghanistan in June 1926.

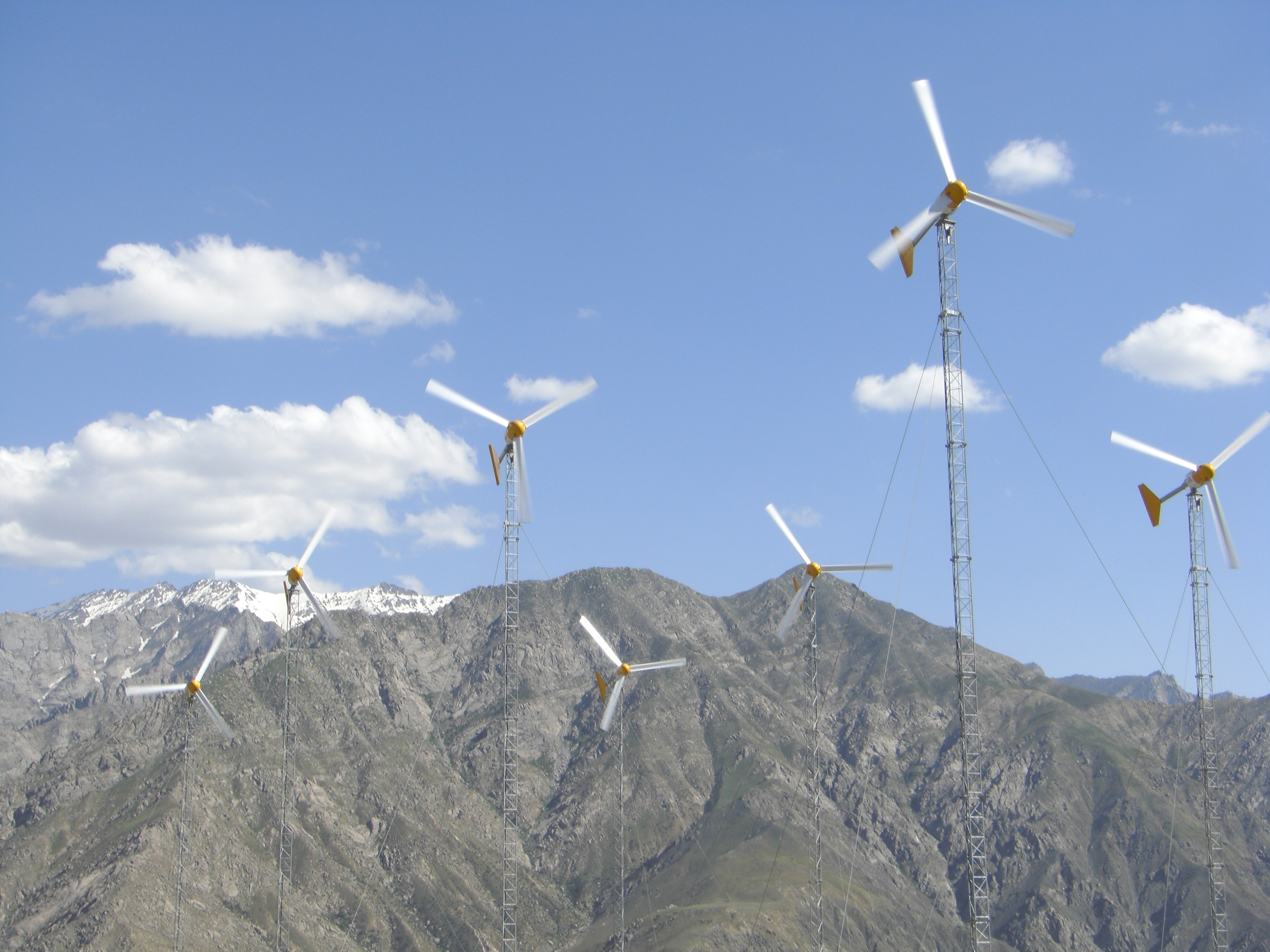
Afghanistan's first wind farm in Panjshir Province.

In July 1973, troops under the command of General Sardar Mohammed Daoud Khan overthrew the Afghan monarchy and established the Republic of Afghanistan. In this coup d'état, General Daoud seized power for himself, effectively proclaiming himself as the first President of Afghanistan. He began making claims over large swathes of Pashtun-dominant territory in Pakistan, causing great anxiety to the government of Pakistan. By 1975, the young Ahmad Shah Massoud and his followers initiated an uprising in Panjshir, but were forced to flee to Peshawar in Pakistan where they received support from Pakistani Prime Minister Zulfiqar Ali Bhutto. Bhutto is said to have paved the way for the April 1978 Saur Revolution in Kabul by making General Daoud spread the Afghan Armed Forces to the countryside.

Panjshir was attacked multiple times during the 1980s Soviet–Afghan War, against Ahmad Shah Massoud and his forces. The Panjshir region was in rebel control from August 17, 1979, after a regional uprising. Aided by its mountainous terrain, the region was well defended by mujahedeen commanders during the war against the PDPA government and the Soviet Union.

After the collapse of the Democratic Republic of Afghanistan in 1992, the area became part of the Islamic State of Afghanistan. By the late 1990s, Panjshir and neighboring Badakhshan province served as a staging ground for the Northern Alliance against the Taliban. On September 9, 2001, Defense Minister Ahmad Shah Massoud was assassinated by two al-Qaeda operatives. Two days later the September 2001 attacks occurred in the United States and this led to the start of a major U.S.-led war in Afghanistan.

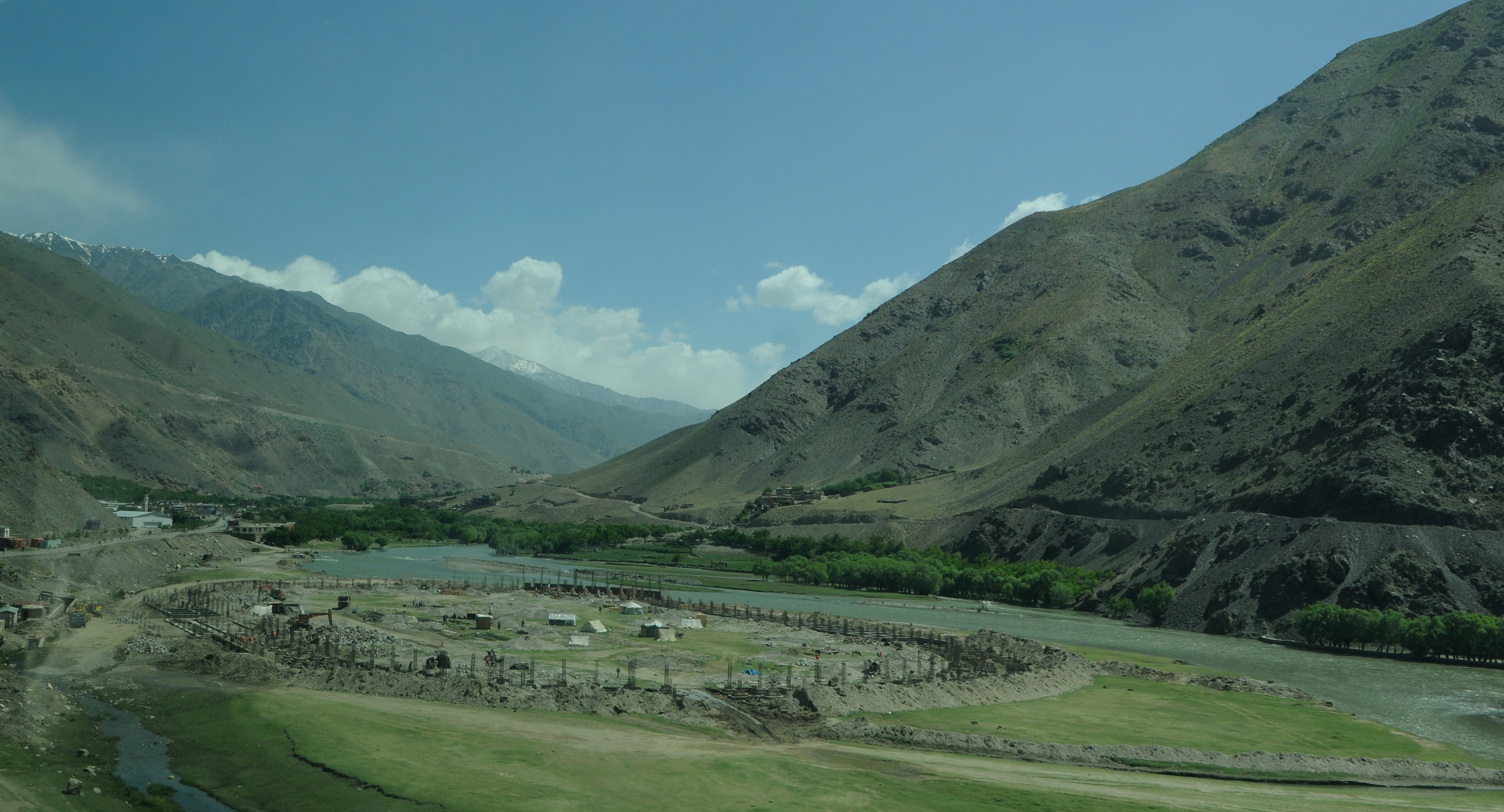
Construction of the Panjshir football stadium, 2011

Containing the Panjshir Valley, in April 2004 Panjshir District of Parwan Province was turned into a province under the Karzai administration. The Afghan National Security Forces (ANSF) established several bases in the province. In the meantime, the International Security Assistance Force (ISAF) also established bases, a US-led Provincial Reconstruction Team (PRT) began operating in Panjshir in the late 2000s.

Following the Fall of Kabul on 15 August 2021, anti-Taliban forces loyal to the Islamic Republic of Afghanistan fled to the Panjshir Province. They formed the National Resistance Front of Afghanistan and kept fighting the new Islamic Emirate of Afghanistan in an ongoing conflict. The new resistance forces flew the old flag of the Northern Alliance. The resistance has held the Panjshir Valley and captured districts in neighboring provinces. By early September 2021, Taliban forces managed to push into Panjshir and capture several districts from the National Resistance Front of Afghanistan, before gaining control of Bazarak on 6 September, pushing remaining resistance fighters into the mountains. However, clashes still remain ongoing between the Taliban and resistance fighters in Panjshir Province. A subsequent visit by Radio Télévision Suisse and Journeyman Pictures into Bazarak in October 2021 also revealed that despite claims of NRF inactivity by local Taliban officials, an armed confrontation between the NRF Taliban was in fact occurring in an undisclosed location in the mountains surrounding Bazarak, with resistance forces gaining the upper hand, thus confirming that the NRF remains still active near Bazarak and in Panjshir Province. Although the NRF continues to carry out attacks, it does not control any territory in the province.

== Administrative divisions ==
Districts of Panjshir Province
District	Capital	Population	Area in km^{2}	Pop. density	Ethnicites and Number of villages
Anaba		43,429	186	109	100% Tajik.
Bazarak	Bazarak	45,038	394	54	100% Tajik. 29 villages.
Darah		78,241	192	82	Predominantly Tajik
Khenj		85,274	689	66	100% Tajik. 154 villages.
Paryan		25,743	1,428	12	100% Tajik. 67 villages.
Rokha		35,432	113	230	Predominantly Tajik, few Pashai. 72 villages.
Shotul		21,783	225	55	100% Tajik. 23 villages.
Panjshir		334,940	3,772	45	97% Tajiks, 2.5% Hazaras, 0.4% Pashayi, 0.1% Ormuri. (Note: Note: "Predominantely" or "dominated" is interpreted as 99%, "majority" as 70%, "mixed" as 1/(number of ethnicities), "minority" as 30% and "few" or "some" as 1%.)

== Demographics ==
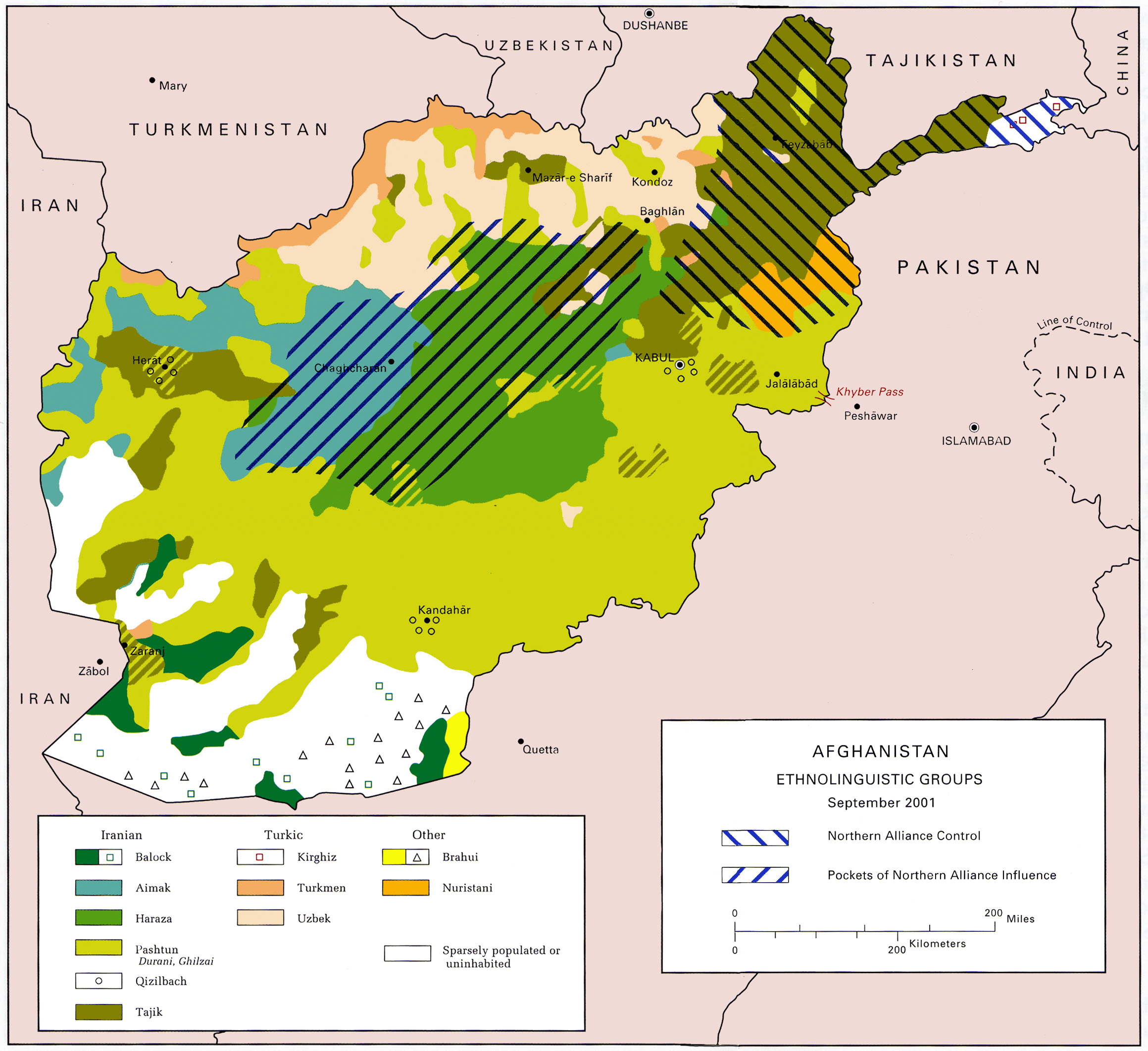
Ethnolinguistic groups in Afghanistan

=== Population ===
As of 2021, the total population of the province is about 334,640. The proportion of residents living below the national poverty line was 19.1%.

=== Ethnicity, languages and religion ===
Panjshir is one of the most ethnically homogeneous provinces in Afghanistan. The dominant population group is most commonly classified as Tajiks, though sometimes identified more narrowly as part of a broader Kohistani identity or more specifically as a distinct Panjshiri community in their own right, comprising the overwhelming majority of the population. Smaller communities of Hazaras, Pashayi, Nuristanis of the Kata tribe, and Kuchis and other Pashtuns are also present, though each constitutes a marginal share of the population. The primary language spoken throughout the province is Dari, with small pockets of Pashto speakers. In religious terms, the population is almost entirely Sunni Muslim.

Estimated ethnolinguistic and -religious composition
Ethnicity	Tajik/ Farsiwan	Hazara	Others	Sources
Period	Tajik/ Farsiwan	Hazara	Others	Sources

2004–2021 (Islamic Republic)	vast majority	small minority	∅
2020 EU	1st	–	–
2018 UN	homogenous	–	–
2015 NPS	∅	∅	∅ (Note: incl. Ghilzai Pashtun, Pashayi, Katta and other Nuristani.)
2011 PRT	majority	–	∅ (Note: incl. a "very small population" of Kuchi.)
2011 USA	mostly	some	∅ (Note: incl. a "small number" of Pashtun, Nuristani and Pashayi.)
2009 ISW	majority	small number	∅ (Note: incl. a "small number" of Pashtun.)

Legend:
- ∅: Ethnicity mentioned in source but not quantified
- –: Ethnicity not mentioned specifically
- Source abbreviations: Empirical sources: –, Government sources: EU – European Union Agency for Asylum, PRT – Provincial Reconstruction Team of the United States government, UN – United Nations Assistance Mission in Afghanistan, Editorial sources: ISW – Institute for the Study of War, NPS – Naval Postgraduate School, USA – United States Army

=== Education ===
The overall literacy rate (6+ years of age) fell from 33% in 2005 to 32% in 2011. The overall net enrolment rate (6–13 years of age) fell from 42% in 2005 to 40% in 2011. Four Technical and Vocational Education and Training (TVET) schools service the agriculturally-oriented Panjshir Province, including the Ahmad Shah Massoud TVET. The school was established with the help from the Hilfe Paderborn and German Foreign Office and as of 2014 had about 250 students and 22 staff members.

=== Health ===
The percentage of households with clean drinking water increased from 16% in 2005, to 17% in 2011.

23% of births in 2011 were attended to by a skilled birth attendant.

== Culture ==
=== Places of interest ===
- The tomb of Ahmad Shah Massoud, is located in Saricha, Bazarak, Panjshir.
- The Football Stadium in Panjshir Valley, next to the Panjshir River.
- Famous Mountains of Panjshir for Hiking Includes:Panjshir Mountains
- Kuh-e Mir Samir 5 768 m (prom: 1 204 m)
- Band-e Ghār 5 387 m (prom: 465 m)
- Kōh-e Maldaygmay 5 340 m (prom: 690 m)
- Mungashayr 5 222 m (prom: 254 m)
- Kōh-e Wār 5 141 m (prom: 131 m)
- Shāhāk 5 110 m (prom: 1 471 m)
- Nāw-e Kalān 5 064 m (prom: 130 m)
- Siyāh Khār Now 5 059 m (prom: 863 m)
- Ghowch 5 012 m (prom: 129 m)
- Kōtal-e Zard 4 996 m (prom: 260 m)

== Notable people ==
- Ahmad Shah Massoud, Afghan national hero, military leader and former defense minister, known for leading armed resistances against Soviets and Taliban
- Ahmad Massoud, son of Ahmad Shah Massoud. He is the Leader of National resistance front of Afghanistan.
- Yousuf Jan Nesar, Documentary maker
- Nigara Mirdad, Diplomat and Women's right activist
- Natiq Malikzada, Journalist and Human right activist
- Qahar Asi, Afghan legendary poet
- Ahmad Zia Massoud, Afghan politician and former Vice President
- Muhammad Qasim Fahim, field marshal, former Vice President of Afghanistan
- Din Mohammad Jurat, 4 Star General and Former deputy of National security council.
- Mohammad Alam Izdyar, First deputy house of elders
- Abdul Hafiz Mansoor, First director of radio and television in Afghanistan
- Ahmad Wali Massoud, Afghan politician
- Dastagir Panjsheri, former minister of education
- Yunus Qanuni, Afghan politician, former Vice President of Afghanistan
- Amrullah Saleh, Afghan politician, former Vice President of Afghanistan
- Haidari Wujodi, Afghan Sufi poet and scholar
- Hasib Qoway Markaz, powerful military leader of National Resistance Front of Afghanistan
- Bismillah Khan Mohammadi, Afghan politician and former defense minister
- Abdul Hamid Khorasani, Taliban commander
- Nooruddin Azizi, Acting Minister of Commerce and Industry since 21 September 2021

== See also ==
- Provinces of Afghanistan
- Panjshir Valley
- Panjshir River
