= Bazarak, Balkh =

Bazarak
- Location in Afghanistan
- Coordinates: 35°45′15″N 67°05′19″E
- Country: Afghanistan
- Province: Balkh Province
- Time zone: + 4.50

Bazarak is a village in Balkh Province in northern Afghanistan.

== See also ==
- Balkh Province
