= Yahya Qanie =

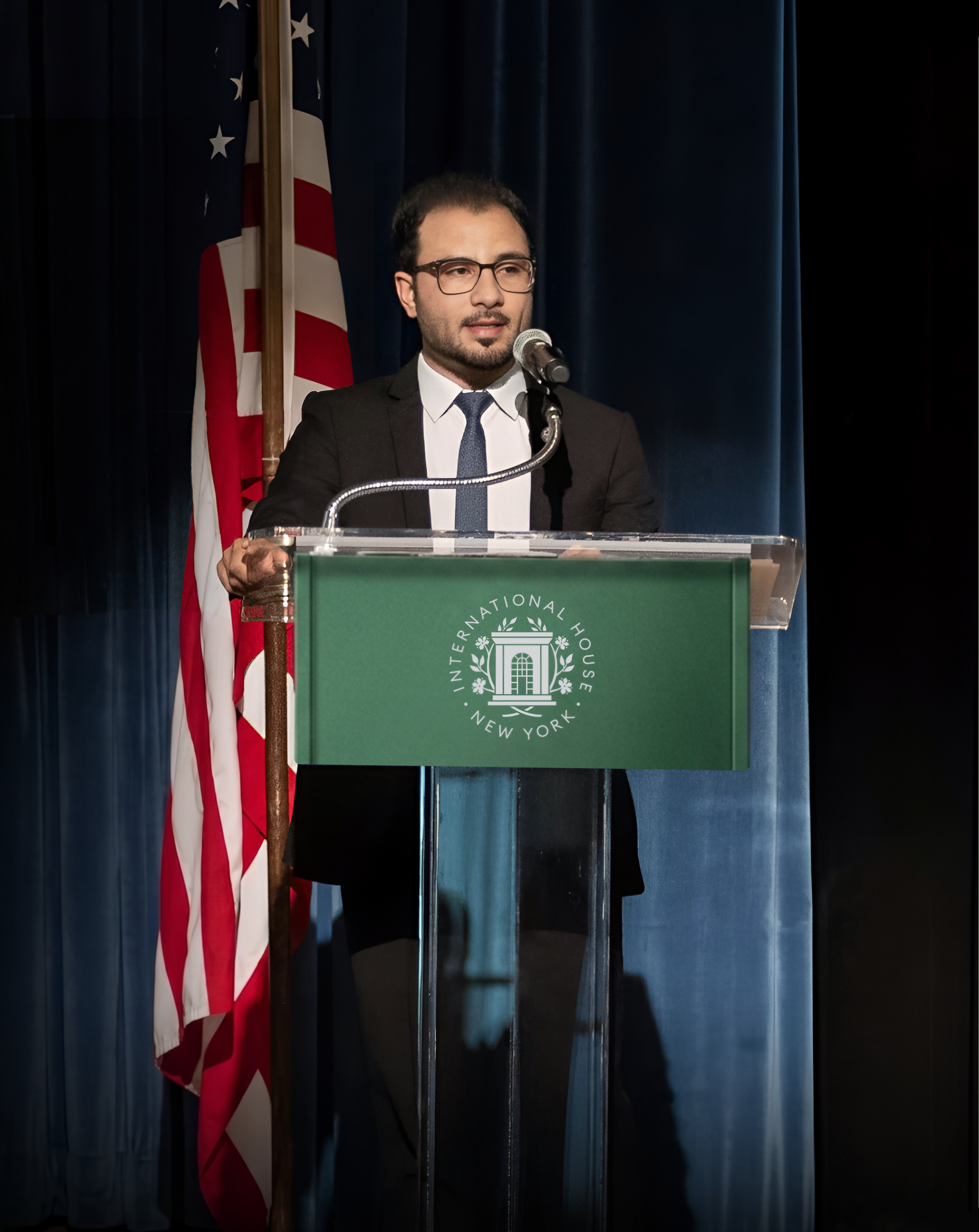
- Born: Mohammad Yahya Qanie; January 6, 1994 (age 32); Peshawar, Pakistan
- Education: BA in French Literature and Legal Translation, Kabul University; MS in Global Affairs, New York University (NYU)
- Occupations: Social entrepreneur, civic activist, researcher
- Website: yahyaqanie.com

Mohammad Yahya Qanie (born January 6, 1994) is an Afghan social entrepreneur, researcher, and civic activist. He has served as the founder and president of the Kabul Model United Nations (Kabul MUN) and the acting president of the United Nations Association of Afghanistan. He has joined the Global Conference on Youth-Inclusive Peace Processes in Doha, Qatar.

Qanie's primary focus is on international security, inclusive governance, civic technology (Civic Tech), and youth empowerment in peace and security processes. He has authored numerous articles on politics, diplomacy, and security in international and Afghan media platforms.

== Early life and education ==
Mohammad Yahya Qanie was born on January 6, 1994, in Peshawar, Pakistan, during the Afghan Civil War. His family returned to Afghanistan in 2003 following the fall of the first Taliban regime. He spent his childhood and adolescence in Kabul and Uruzgan, and graduated from Habibia High School in 2011.

In 2012, Qanie entered Kabul University and received his bachelor's degree in French Language and Literature and Legal Translation in 2016. During this period, he also obtained a diploma in law from Jean Moulin University Lyon 3 in France and completed coursework at the American University of Afghanistan.

Following the collapse of the Afghan government, Qanie immigrated to the United States. He pursued his higher education and completed his Master of Science (M.S.) in Global Affairs with a concentration in Transnational Security at the New York University School of Professional Studies Center for Global Affairs (NYU SPS CGA). He was one of the recipients of the Afghan Crisis Scholarship at NYU.

== Professional and civic activities ==
=== Kabul Model United Nations (Kabul MUN) ===
In 2016, Qanie founded the Kabul Model United Nations (Kabul MUN) platform and served as its president. The organization aimed to provide a civic and diplomatic space for Afghan youth to discuss national and global crises, develop leadership skills, and engage in politics and peacebuilding.

=== International activities and peace process ===
Qanie has played a prominent role internationally as a representative of Afghanistan's young generation. He was a member of the steering group for the development of a five-year global strategy on the "Inclusion of Youth in the Peace Process," a joint initiative advanced by the UN Youth Envoy, Search for Common Ground, and the United Network of Young Peacebuilders (UNOY).

He also collaborated as a fellow with the Global Initiative for Justice, Truth and Reconciliation, working alongside nine other international experts to develop a Global Toolkit for atrocity prevention. His efforts in this arena have focused on reclaiming the voices of Afghan youth and envisioning a better future.

In January 2022, Qanie was invited as a youth representative to the opening ceremony of the "High-Level Global Conference on Youth-Inclusive Peace Processes" in Doha, Qatar.

=== Civic technology and AI ===
In recent years, Qanie has focused on the intersection of emerging technologies, artificial intelligence, and transnational security. He aims to create new models of civic participation, institutional accountability, and public trust building through public-interest technology.

== Views and writings ==
He has authored numerous analytical articles in prominent domestic and international publications. His writings primarily focus on the Afghan peace process, youth participation in governance, security challenges, and the migrant crisis:

- In an article for The Independent, he discussed the struggle of Afghanistan's young generation against the return of the Taliban and their role in the future of the peace process.
- In his writing for TOLOnews, he emphasized the importance of safeguarding the rights of the new generation and the necessity of inclusive platforms.
- In an op-ed for 8am, he pointed out that traditional peace negotiations have lost their effectiveness and that innovative approaches are required.
- He has also analyzed the challenges faced by Afghan migrants in neighboring countries, such as Iran, for publications like Kayhan Life.

== Awards and honors ==
- Received an official appreciation letter from the former First Lady of Afghanistan for his continuous efforts in developing youth platforms.
- Nominated for the Asia 21 Young Leaders Award in 2018.
- Recipient of the Afghan Crisis Scholarship from the NYU School of Professional Studies (NYU SPS) in 2022.

== See also ==
- United Nations Security Council Resolution 2250
- Kabul University
- Model United Nations
