= Bazarak District =

Bazarak بازارک
- District
- Location within Afghanistan
- Coordinates: 34.55°N 70.55°E
- Country: Afghanistan
- Province: Panjshir
- Time zone: UTC+04:30 (AST)

Bazarak District (Dari: ولسوالی بازارک) is a district of Panjshir Province, Afghanistan. The population in 2019 was estimated to be 20,892.

The district was reportedly the last of the province captured by the Taliban from the National Resistance Front of Afghanistan on 6 September, during the Republican insurgency in Afghanistan. Remaining resistance fighters were pushed into the mountains. On 9 September, however, Ali Maisam Nazary, the Resistance's spokesman and foreign relations head, downplayed the amount of territory the Taliban was reported to have taken control of in Panjshir province, stating that 60% was still under National Resistance Front control.

== See also ==
- Districts of Afghanistan
