= List of cement manufacturers in Afghanistan =

This is the list of companies that manufacture cement in Afghanistan. Some are under construction.

1. Ghori cement factory in Puli Khumri, Baghlan Province
2. Gulbahar cement factory in Herat Province
3. Safwan cement factory in Jabal Saraj, Parwan Province
4. Jabal al-Saraj cement factory in Jabal Saraj, Parwan Province
5. Logar cement contracting company in Logar Province
6. Kandahar cement factory near the Shorandam industrial park, which is between Kandahar and Ahmad Shah Baba International Airport.
7. Yateem Taq cement project in Jawzjan Province

== See also ==
- List of companies of Afghanistan
