= Ahtaj =

Town in Parwan Province, Afghanistan

- Town
- Location in Afghanistan
- Coordinates: 35°02′N 69°15′E
- Country: Afghanistan
- Province: Parwan
- District: Sayed Khel
- Time zone: + 4.30

Ahtaj (Pashto: احتیاج) is a town in Sayed Khel District of Parwan Province, Afghanistan.

== See also ==
- Parwan Province
