= Zarar Ahmad Osmani =

Afghan politician (born 1964)

Zarar Ahmad Moqbel Osmani
- ضرار احمد عثمانی
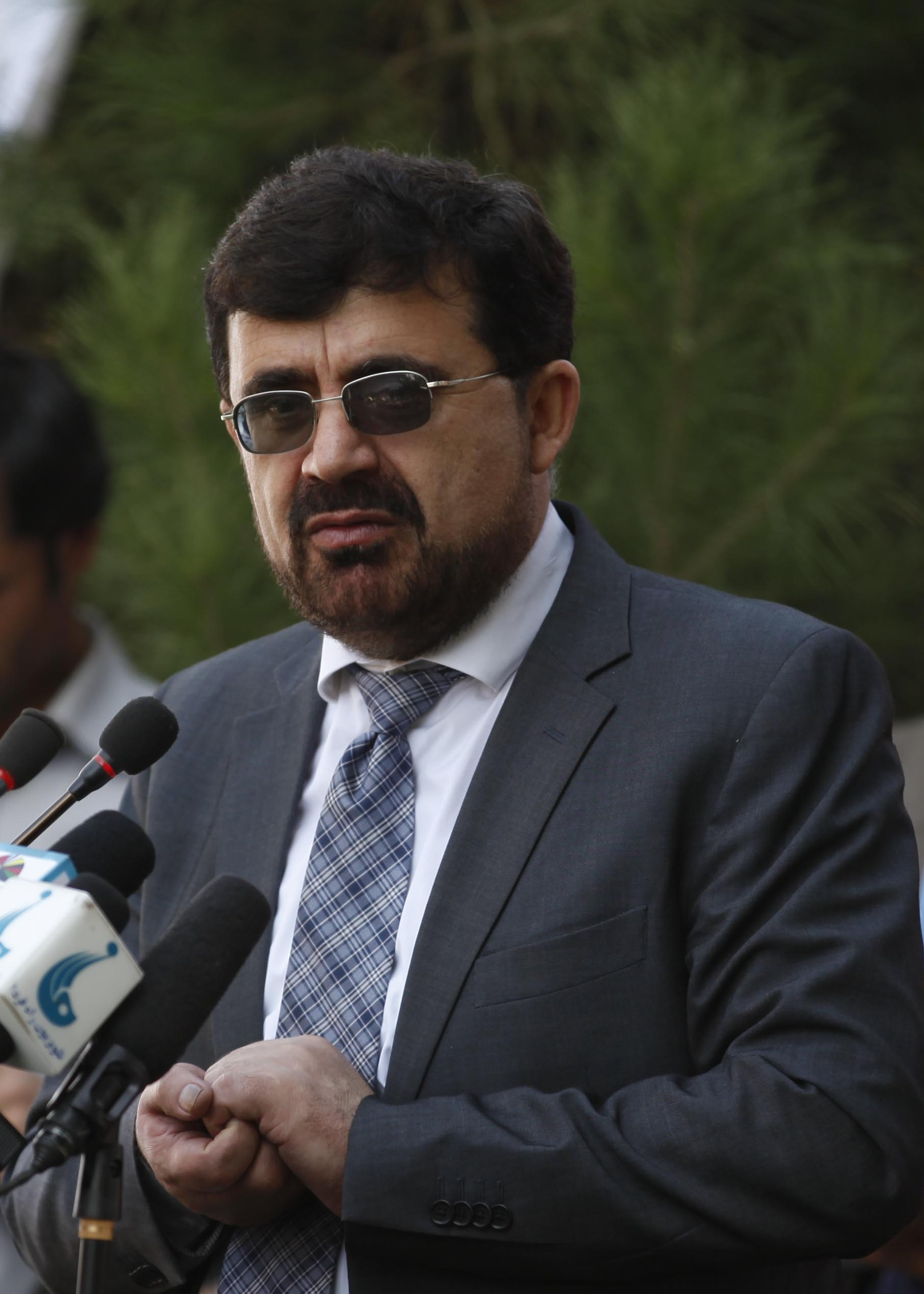
- Osmani, in October 2011, speaking as Afghan Minister of Counter Narcotics

Minister of Foreign Affairs
- In office 28 October 2013 – 1 February 2015
- President: Hamid Karzai; Ashraf Ghani
- Preceded by: Zalmai Rassoul
- Succeeded by: Salahuddin Rabbani

Personal details
- Born: 1964 (age 61–62) Parwan Province, Kingdom of Afghanistan
- Education: Parwan Pedagogy Institute (B. A.)

Zarar Ahmad Moqbel Osmani (Dari: ضرار احمد عثمانی, Pashto: ضرار احمد عثمانی, born 1964) is a politician in the Islamic Republic of Afghanistan who was Minister of Foreign Affairs (2013 to 2015) and Minister of Interior (2005 to 2008). Previously, he was Minister of Counter Narcotics and Governor of Parwan Province. Prior to this, he was Chief of Police of Parwan province and First Secretary to Afghan Embassy in Tehran. He also joined the mujahideen during the Soviet–Afghan War, fighting against the Afghan government led by Mohammad Najibullah.

== Early years and education ==
Osmani was born in 1964 in Khuwaja Sayaran village, Parwan Province, Afghanistan. His father was a parliamentarian during King Zahir Shah's administration. He completed his primary education at Sayed Jamaluddin Afghani School in Kabul and his secondary education at Mohammad Osman Khan-e-Parwani Vocational School. He graduated from Habibia High School and later enrolled in the Polytechnical University of Kabul. He studied in Kabul Polytechnic institute from 1983 to 1988. He obtained his BA from the Parwan Pedagogy Institute specializing in math and physics.

== Careers ==
In 1988, Osmani joined the mujahideen in Parwan. However, after the collapse of Najibullah's government in 1992, Osmani was made the Deputy Chief of Staff at the Ministry of National Defense under new the Islamic State of Afghanistan.

By April 1994, Osmani was serving as Chief of Police of Parwan province. Between 1998 and 2002, he served as First Secretary at Afghan Embassy in Tehran. It is said that he was instrumental in helping unite the Northern Alliance. After the collapse of the Taliban regime and establishment of the Karzai administration, Osamani became Governor of Parwan Province in February 2004.

In 2009, Osmani was appointed Minister of Counter Narcotics. During his confirmation, he received the highest ever number of confidence votes from the Afghan Parliament.

On 28 October 2013, President Karzai appointed Osmani as the acting Foreign Minister.

Political offices
Preceded by Ali Ahmad Jalali	Minister of Interior; 2005–2008	Succeeded by Mohammad Hanif Atmar
Preceded by Zalmai Rassoul	Minister of Foreign Affairs; 2013–2015	Succeeded by Salahuddin Rabbani
Preceded by	Minister of Counter Narcotics; 2009–2013	Succeeded by Din Mohammad Mubariz Rashidi
