= Charikar (disambiguation) =

Charikar is a city in Afghanistan.

Charikar may also refer to:

- Charikar District, a district of the Parwan province, whose capital city is Charikar
- Moses Charikar, Indian computer scientist and researcher
