= Masoud Khalili =

Afghan diplomat (born 1950)

- مسعود خلیلی

Afghan (Islamic Republic of) Ambassador to Spain
- Incumbent
- Assumed office 2010
- President: Hamid Karzai
- Preceded by: Gul Ahmad Sherzada

Afghan Ambassador to Turkey
- In office 2007–2010
- President: Hamid Karzai
- Succeeded by: Salahuddin Rabbani

Afghan Ambassador to India
- In office 2001–2006
- President: Hamid Karzai
- Succeeded by: Sayed Makhdoom Raheen

Personal details
- Born: 1950 (age 75–76) Jabal Saraj, Parwan Province, Afghanistan
- Party: Jamiat-i Islami
- Occupation: Diplomat

Masoud Khalili, also Massoud Khalili and Masud Khalili (Persian: مسعود خلیلی; born 5 November 1950) is an Afghan diplomat, linguist and poet. Khalili is the son of the famous Persian language and Afghan poet laureate, Ustad Khalilullah Khalili. In the war against the Soviets from 1980 to 1990, he was the political head of the Jamiat-e Islami Party of Afghanistan and close advisor to Commander Ahmad Shah Massoud. In the internal conflict that followed, he chose to be the Special Envoy in Pakistan to President Burhannudin Rabbani. Deported from the same country for his high rank in the Northern Alliance, he went to New Delhi in 1996 as the Ambassador of the Afghanistan (Anti-Taliban) where he stayed for many years. He was non-resident Ambassador to Sri Lanka and Nepal at the same time.

On September 9, 2001, Khalili was sitting next to Ahmad Shah Massoud when two men posing as journalists set off a bomb placed in their camera. Massoud was assassinated and Khalili was severely injured but survived. Two days later, al-Qaeda attacked the U.S.

After his recovery, he was made the ambassador of Afghanistan to Turkey and then the first Afghan ambassador to Spain.

== Early life and education ==
Khalili is the son of the Persian language poet Ustad Khalilullah Khalili. Born in Jabal Saraj, Parwan Province in Afghanistan, Massoud Khalili grew up in Kabul where his father taught at Kabul University. As a student he reportedly spent 5 years in India. Khalili got his BA in Delhi College and MA from Kirori Mal College in the 70s.

== Career ==
=== Resistance against Soviet invasion ===
Khalili was a friend and adviser to Ahmad Shah Massoud, resistance commander known as the "Lion of Panjshir" against the Soviet invasion of Afghanistan (1979–1989), defense minister of Afghanistan (1992–2001) and leader of the United Front (Northern Alliance) against the Taliban.

Khalili and Massoud met for the first time in October 1978 after the communist Saur Revolution had overthrown the government of Mohammed Daoud Khan. Khalili remembers:

"We talked about the past and the future. I was talking more, maybe because I was older, but I found out later that listening was his habit."

Both men quickly discovered their shared interest for poetry.

After the meeting Khalili went on to live in the United States for two years where his father, Ustad Khalilullah Khalili, was serving as the ambassador to the United States. In 1980 he went back to Afghanistan to join Ahmad Shah Massoud's resistance against the Soviet invasion of Afghanistan (1979–1989). Khalili remembers:

"I wrote in my diary that I found something in him [Massoud] very vivid, distinguished, and strong: the hope he has for the liberation of Afghanistan. I wrote, "He is on the move, and while he is watching the mighty power of the Russians and their arsenal, he is planning how to defeat it with commitment. [...] we talked about how to reach the people of the world and convince them that the Afghan people would stand whether they helped or not. They would stand by their own will and would continue the fight to victory, whether others wanted it or not."

In the 1980s Masood Khalili became a spokesperson and interpreter for Ahmad Shah Massoud. He traveled Afghanistan, Pakistan and Europe as a diplomat for the resistance. Massoud went on to defeat nine major offensives by the Soviet Red Army. When the Soviets retreated from Afghanistan, The Wall Street Journal named him "the Afghan, who won the cold war".

Masood Khalili describes the period after the Soviet withdrawal with the following words:

"The communist retreat from Kabul marked the end of one war and the beginning of another. Gulbuddin Hekmatyar was just beyond the capital, and that chapter would be very dark, bloody, and brutal. [...] Those were the worst years for us, and I think certainly the worst for Commander Massoud. [...] Whenever you go back to the years 1992 to 1996, you find this chapter of Afghanistan full of blood. But, why do people call it a "civil" war? [...] Unfortunately, Iran was helping one [...] group, Uzbekistan was helping another group, and Pakistan was helping another - Hekmatyar. They made up something like a council of solidarity [...] The Commander [who had been appointed as Afghan minister of defense in 1992 by the peace and power-sharing agreement, the Peshawar Accords,] was almost alone with his own forces. [...] The various forces fighting the government [also established by the Peshawar Accords] were all supported by neighboring countries who had their own interests and wanted us to fight each other [...]"

Masood Khalili again started to work around Massoud as an adviser, interpreter and envoy - "as a soldier without a gun" as he calls it himself. In 1995 Khalili served as the Islamic State of Afghanistan government's envoy to Pakistan for President Burhanuddin Rabbani. Relations between the Islamic State of Afghanistan and Pakistan were tense because of the latter's support to Gulbuddin Hekmatyar and the Taliban. In late 1995 Pakistan's government expelled Khalili in what The Washington Post called "the latest sign of worsening relations between the two countries".

On September 27, 1996, the Taliban seized power in Kabul with military support by Pakistan and financial support by Saudi Arabia and established the Islamic Emirate of Afghanistan. The Taliban Emirate received no diplomatic recognition from the international community (except from Saudi Arabia, Pakistan and the United Arab Emirates). The United Nations and the international community kept recognition with the Islamic State of Afghanistan government Masood Khalili was working for. The Taliban imposed on the parts of Afghanistan under their control their political and judicial interpretation of Islam issuing edicts forbidding women to work outside the home, attend school, or to leave their homes unless accompanied by a male relative. The Physicians for Human Rights (PHR) analyze:

To PHR’s knowledge, no other regime in the world has methodically and violently forced half of its population into virtual house arrest, prohibiting them on pain of physical punishment.

Masood Khalili was not in Kabul during that time but he recalls a phone call he got from Massoud:

"He said: "Did you hear that we left Kabul?" "Yes. Are you okay? Are the others okay?" "Yes," and he added, "We'll go back." Then he asked: "Do you have something in mind to tell me?" [...] I told him a verse of my father's that night:

Oh the cruel, the despot, the oppressor!
I will not indeed be giving that to the one who wants to destroy me.
You will see me in another battle, in another time,
Because God has given hope to my heart,
And this hope will bring me back to what I want to reach.

"That is what I wanted. Hope will take us back! It's good that you have told me this tonight. Thank you very much."

Defense minister Ahmad Shah Massoud created the United Front (Northern Alliance) in opposition to the Taliban regime. The resistance against the Taliban was joined by leaders of all Afghan ethnicities and backgrounds. The Taliban committed massacres killing thousands of civilians. As a consequence many civilians fled to the area of Ahmad Shah Massoud. National Geographic concluded in its documentary "Inside the Taliban":

"The only thing standing in the way of future Taliban massacres is Ahmad Shah Massoud."

Khalili remained an adviser to Ahmad Shah Massoud. In 1996 he was appointed as ambassador of the United Front to India.

=== September 9, 2001 ===
In September 2001, while preparing against planned offensives by the Taliban in Takhar province, Ahmed Shah Massoud asked Masood Khalili to come over to Takhar to advise him.

Speaking to BBC correspondent Lyse Doucet Masood Khalili recalled the morning of 9 September 2001:

"The night before that [the assassination] we talked for about three-four hours until 3.30 in the morning. Around that time he told me, Let us open the book and see what will happen - a poetry book that he had, he opened it - it's a kind of telling fortune, from Hafez, the great poet, Persian poet. And mostly in Afghanistan we open his book and see what happens to our future. And then I opened it and it came that ... 'Take out from your heart all the siblings of enmity, plant the tree and seed of love - Tonight you two are together. Valuate, many nights go, many days disappear. You two will not be able to see each other again'.

Elsewhere he recalls:

"The ... morning around ten he came to my room. My passport was lying on the bed. He told me to put my passport in my shirt pocket. [...] We went to the river that divides central Asia and Afghanistan, the Amu Darya. He told me two Arabs were there for an interview. ... We went in and he was on my left. The cameraman was in front of us. I remember the pious smile of the photographer ... And after five minutes he died and I survived."

On September 9, 2001, Khalili interpreted for Massoud while he was interviewed by two Tunisians allegedly belonging to al-Qaeda posing as journalists. During the interview the suicide assassins detonated a bomb hidden in the video camera. Ahmad Shah Massoud died in a helicopter that was taking him and Khalili to hospital. Another aide of Massoud also died in the attack. The Los Angeles Times writes: "The explosion left Khalili blind in his right eye, deaf in his right ear and badly burned over much of his body, which was peppered by about 1,000 pieces of shrapnel. About 300 pieces are still in his left leg." The passport, which Massoud had told him to put into his shirt pocket, had stopped eight pieces of shrapnel from entering Khalili's heart and had thereby saved his life.

"God saved me, but always God is helped by some means."

About the death of Massoud he said:

"When you are buried in the hearts of the people, you are always alive."
"Whenever you fight for the right cause, if you die, you don't die. But if you fight for the wrong cause, you never live."

Two days later the attacks of September 11, 2001, killed nearly 3,000 people on U.S. soil.

== Recent activities ==
After the fall of the Taliban regime Masood Khalili served as the ambassador of Afghanistan to India from 2001 to 2006. In 2007 he was appointed as ambassador to Turkey. To promote the Afghan Culture, Khalili recently translated a book of poems of his father Ustad Khalilullah Khalili into English. About the presence of foreign troops in Afghanistan he said in 2008:

"[T]hose boys give their lives for Afghanistan; a boy from America, Holland, France giving his life, we always admire him. [...] I wish he [Massoud] could be alive today, to see the world is now helping Afghanistan."

About the struggles faced by his country he stated in 2006:

"[W]e should not again be interfered with, covertly or overtly, by any neighbouring country. They have the potential to destabilise us. If that is stopped, leave the country to the Afghans. We will make many mistakes but ultimately we will come through. [...] Give us time. After 25 years of war, at least give us 20 years to stand again. This is not easy. The people want to live in peace. Help us with our economy, just so that we can stand again. [...] For 25 years people have seen war. They have lost 1.5 million people. Imagine it -- the pain of the loss of a brother, the loss of a son. We have a phrase that you will never know the fire as long as you are not in it. May God not put any country in the fire that we were in."

Khalili was later appointed the Afghan ambassador to Spain in 2010. In August 2019 he was mugged on the street in Barcelona suffering a leg injury while in the city to attend celebrations marking Afghanistan's Independence Day. His €17,000 watch was stolen as part of a significant increase in aggressive petty thefts in the city.
