= Puli Khumri =

Puli Khumri: پل خمري (Pashto); پل خمری (Dari)
- Provincial capital
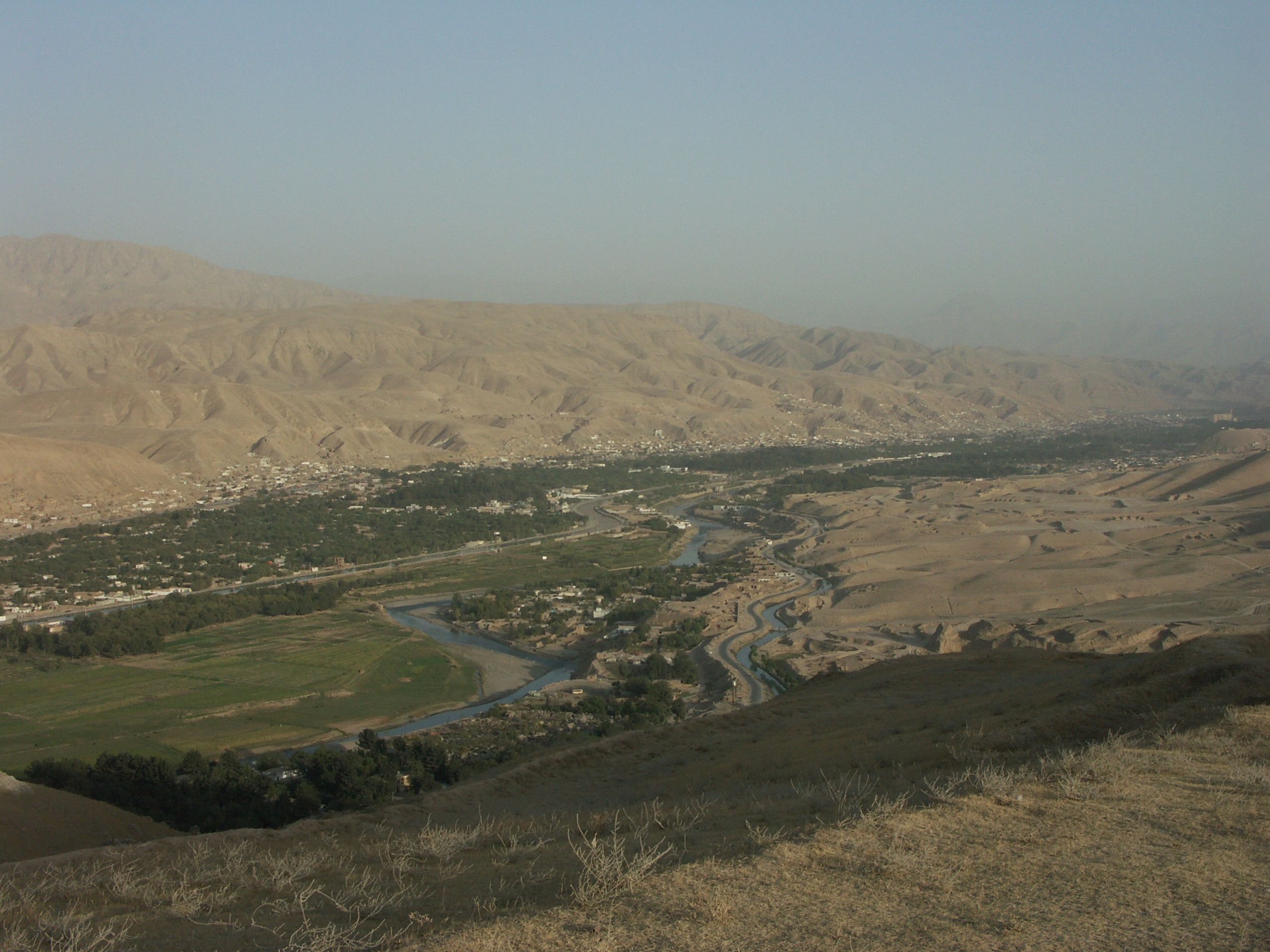
- View of the city

- Location in Afghanistan
- Coordinates: 35°57′N 68°42′E
- Country: Afghanistan
- Province: Baghlan
- District: Puli Khumri

Government
  - Type: Municipality
  - Mayor: Maulvi Abdul Latif Mazlom

Area
  - Provincial capital: 3,752 ha (9,270 acres)
  - Land: 181 km^{2} (70 sq mi)
- Elevation: 920 m (3,020 ft)

Population (2025)
  - Provincial capital: 230,112
  - Density: 1,270/km^{2} (3,290/sq mi)
  - Urban: 139,252
  - Rural: 90,860
- Time zone: UTC+04:30 (Afghanistan Time)
- ISO 3166 code: AF-PLK

Puli Khumri, (Note: Pashto: پل خمري, romanized: Pul Xumri [pu.li xum.ɾi]; Dari: پل خمری, romanized: Pul-i Xumrī [pʰʊ.lɪ xʊm.ɾíː]) also written as Pul-i-Khumri or Pol-e Khomri, is a city in northern Afghanistan, serving as the capital of Baghlan Province. It is within the jurisdiction of Puli Khumri District and has an estimated population of 230,112 people. Maulvi Abdul Latif Mazlom is the current mayor of the city. His predecessor was Maulvi Mohammad Anwar Mustaqeem.

Puli Khumri has a number of factories, bazaars, business centers, public parks, banks, hotels, restaurants, mosques, hospitals, universities, and places to play sports or just relax. It is home to Baghlan University. The Ghori cement factory is also in Puli Khumri. In 2015 there were 24,586 dwelling units in the city.

Puli Khumri sits at an elevation of approximately 920 m (3,020 ft) above sea level in the Hindu Kush mountain range. The city is administratively divided into six districts (nahias), covering a land area of 181 km^{2} (70 sq mi). It is connected by the Afghanistan Ring Road with Kunduz to the north, Charikar in Parwan Province to the southeast, and Mazar-i-Sharif in Balkh Province to the northwest.

== History ==
During the 1980s, Puli Khumri was officially granted the status of the capital of Baghlan province in place of the central city of Baghlan. This transition occurred under the influence of Sayed Mansur Naderi, son of Sayed Kayan, who held significant military and political power at the time. The relocation aimed to enhance public access to administrative offices, leveraging Puli Khumri's strategic location along the Kabul-Mazar highway. The cabinet of Mohammad Najibullah, led by Sultan Ali Keshtmand, initially proposed this move through declaration number 492 on March 1, 1989. It was subsequently formalized by Najibullah through decree number 1603 on March 9, 1989.

From August 8–10, 1988, there were fires and explosions in the 3704th Ammunition Depot of the 40th Army (Soviet Union), located in the Kelgai Valley near the town. The detonation of the explosives storage facility, according to eyewitnesses, resembled a nuclear one with the appearance of a characteristic nuclear "mushroom cloud". Eight soldiers and one civilian cook may have been killed, with others wounded. Western sources reported that the Soviet Ministry of Foreign Affairs (Soviet Union) denied there had been any casualties.

The lead nation of the local Provincial Reconstruction Team was Hungary, which operated in the city from 2006 to March 2013. Previous to 2006, the lead nation was the Netherlands.

Taliban insurgents have been active in the Dand-e-Shahabuddin part of Puli Khumri since 2017. On 5 May 2019, Taliban members stormed the city's police headquarters, killing 13 police. On 1 September 2019, Taliban assaulted the city, but were repelled by the Afghan Army. On 16 January 2021, the district's NDS chief Fazal Wakilzada was killed in a Taliban attack.

On 10 August 2021, Puli Khumri became the eighth provincial capital to be captured by the Taliban as part of their nationwide military offensive. On 13 October 2023, 7 people were killed and 15 injured in a suicide bombing at a Shia mosque carried out by Islamic State – Khorasan Province.

== Geography ==
Puli Khumri is in a valley by the Kunduz River in northern Afghanistan, about 100 km (60 mi) south of Kunduz, 200 km (120 mi) southeast of Mazar-i-Sharif, and 230 km (140 mi) north of Kabul. It sits at an elevation of approximately 920 m (3,020 ft) above sea level, within the Hindu Kush mountain range.

The city is a transit and trading hub in the region. It is connected by the Afghanistan Ring Road with Baghlan to the north, Charikar to the southeast, and Mazar-i-Sharif to the northwest.

Puli Khumri has 6 city districts (nahias), covering a land area of 181 km^{2} (70 sq mi) or 3,752 ha (9,270 acres). Agricultural lands accounted for the largest land use in the city (65%), with the majority of that land in Districts 3, 5, and 6. Districts 1 and 2 had the highest dwelling densities but District 5 is home to the most dwelling units. Puli Khumri has a diverse housing stock consisting of regular, irregular, and hillside houses as well as apartment buildings.

=== Climate ===
Puli Khumri features a cool semi-arid climate (BSk) under the Köppen climate classification. The average temperature in Puli Khumri is 15.9 °C or 60.6 °F, while the annual precipitation averages 282 mm or 11.10 in.

July is the hottest month of the year with an average temperature of 28.5 °C or 83.3 °F. The coldest month January has an average temperature of 3.0 °C or 37.4 °F.

Climate data for Puli Khumri
Month	Jan	Feb	Mar	Apr	May	Jun	Jul	Aug	Sep	Oct	Nov	Dec	Year
Mean daily maximum °C (°F)	8.3 (46.9)	10.9 (51.6)	16.2 (61.2)	21.8 (71.2)	28.7 (83.7)	35.3 (95.5)	37.1 (98.8)	35.9 (96.6)	31.6 (88.9)	24.8 (76.6)	15.7 (60.3)	9.6 (49.3)	23.0 (73.4)
Daily mean °C (°F)	3.0 (37.4)	5.7 (42.3)	10.7 (51.3)	16.0 (60.8)	21.3 (70.3)	26.5 (79.7)	28.5 (83.3)	27.0 (80.6)	22.5 (72.5)	16.5 (61.7)	9.1 (48.4)	4.2 (39.6)	15.9 (60.7)
Mean daily minimum °C (°F)	−2.2 (28.0)	0.6 (33.1)	5.3 (41.5)	10.2 (50.4)	14.0 (57.2)	17.8 (64.0)	19.9 (67.8)	18.1 (64.6)	13.4 (56.1)	8.2 (46.8)	2.5 (36.5)	−1.1 (30.0)	8.9 (48.0)
Average precipitation mm (inches)	31 (1.2)	43 (1.7)	63 (2.5)	65 (2.6)	27 (1.1)	0 (0)	0 (0)	0 (0)	0 (0)	8 (0.3)	20 (0.8)	25 (1.0)	282 (11.2)

== Demographics ==
According to Afghanistan's National Statistics and Information Authority, Puli Khumri has an estimated population of 230,112 people. In 2015 there were 24,586 dwelling units in the city.

== Economy ==
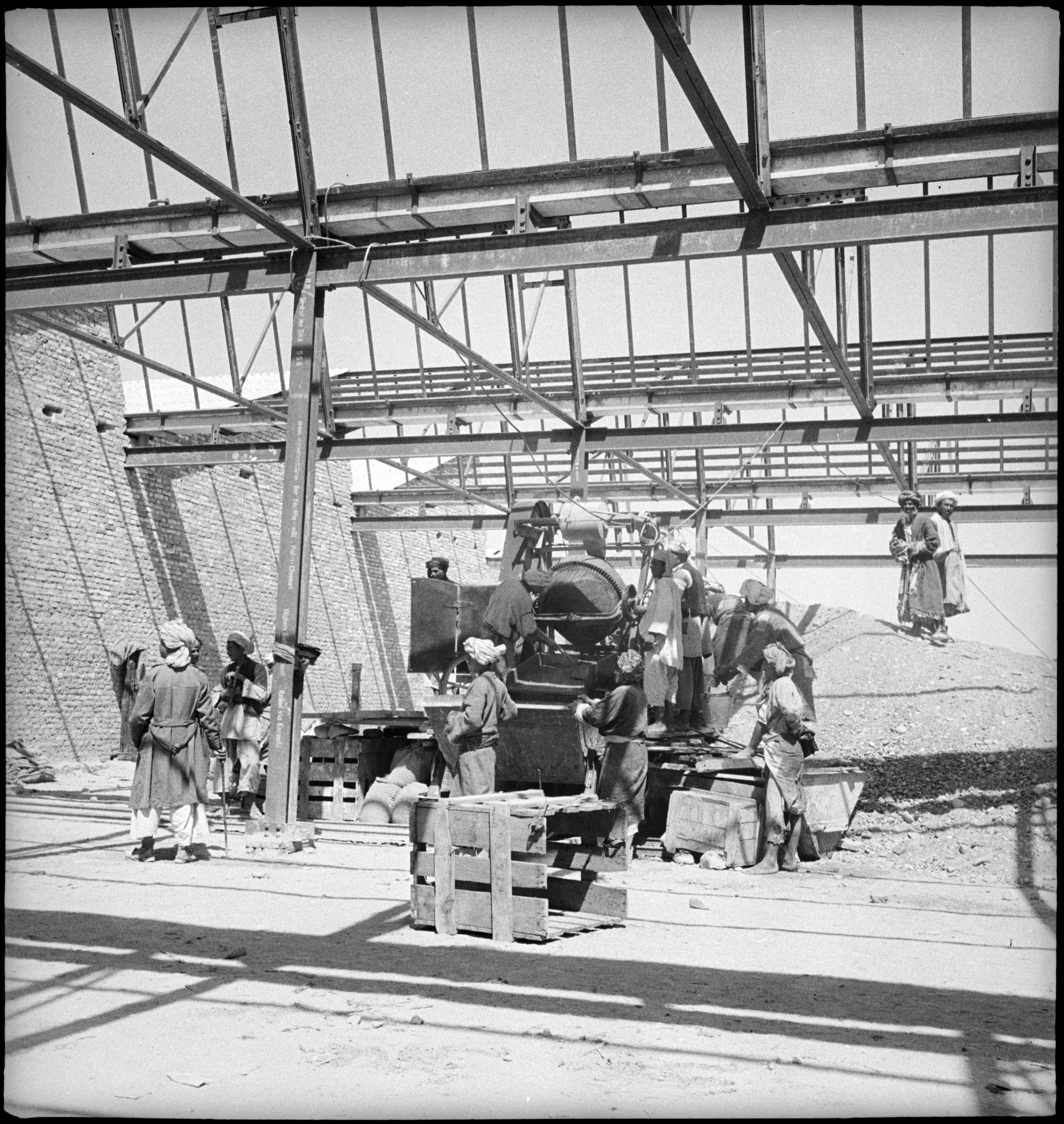
Men working on a scaffold, c. 1939

The economy of Puli Khumri is based on agriculture, trade, mining, transport, and textile production. There is at least one major textile factory in the city. Agriculture is very important because of the rain and temperature; wheat, rice, and spices are the main crops. There are two dams in Puli Khumri, which provide the necessary electricity. Electrical transmission lines built from Puli Khumri bring a steady supply of electricity to Kabul.

Afghanistan's first cement factory, Ghori I Cement Factory, was built in 1954 in Puli Khumri with financial support from Czechoslovakia. A third plant is under construction since August 2025. The limestone is mined from the hill behind the factory.

There is a coal mine outside of the city in the village Kar-kar, but the production system is archaic.

== Education ==
There are a number of public and private schools in Puli Khumri. There are also a number of universities. Those who cannot go to school find a job.

== See also ==
- List of cities in Afghanistan
