= Mohammad Asim Asim =

Afghan politician

Mohammad Asim Asim محمدعاصم عاصم
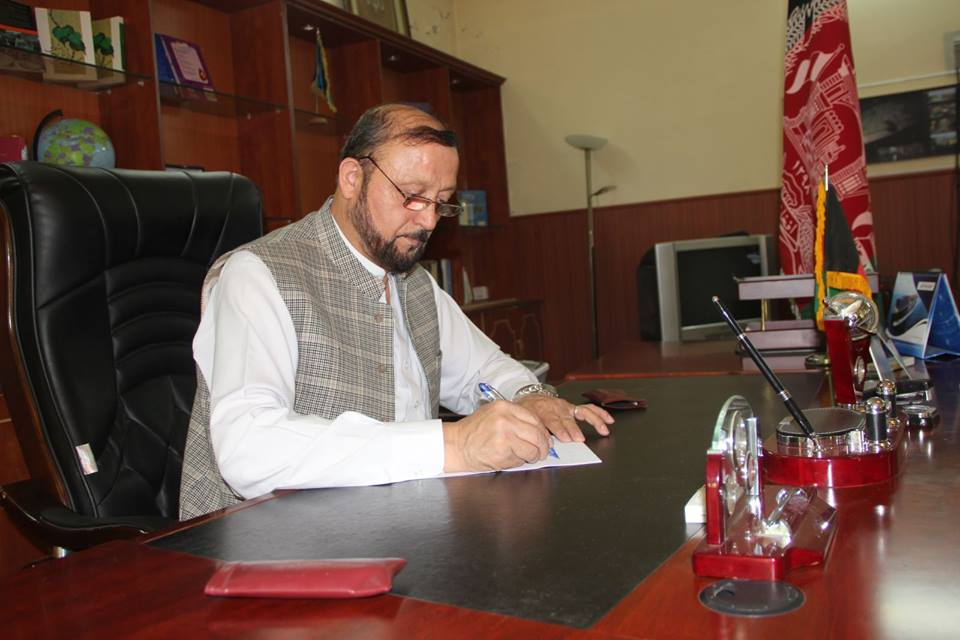

Governor of Parwan Province, Afghanistan
- In office 8 June 2015 – 4 February 2018
- Preceded by: Abdul Basir Salangi
- Succeeded by: Fazluddin Ayyar

Personal details
- Born: 26 November 1958 (age 66); Khinjan District, Baghlan Province, Afghanistan
- Political party: National Coalition of Afghanistan
- Profession: Politician

Eng. Mohammad Asim Asim (Dari: محمدعاصم عاصم) is a politician in Afghanistan. He is a former governor of Parwan Province from 8 June 2015 till 4 February 2018.

== Early life and education ==
Asim was born in 1958 in Khinjan District, Baghlan Province. He completed his higher education in BA and master in Islamic relations at Peshawar University.

== Career ==
He served as a Deputy Minister of Telecommunication. Asim was an MP who is close to both Abdullah Abdullah and Yunus Qanuni. He participated in the Emergency Loya Jirga in 2002 and was a member of parliament from 2005 to 2010. During the 2014 presidential campaign, he worked with Dr Abdullah Abdullah and is described as a close aid. He was a key member of his unity government negotiations team. Mr Asim is married and has five daughters and six sons.

Preceded by Abdul Basir Salangi	Governor of Parwan Province, Afghanistan; 8 June 2015–4 February 2018	Incumbent
