= Abdul Basir Salangi =

Afghan politician

Abdul Basir Salangi عبدالبصیر سالنگی
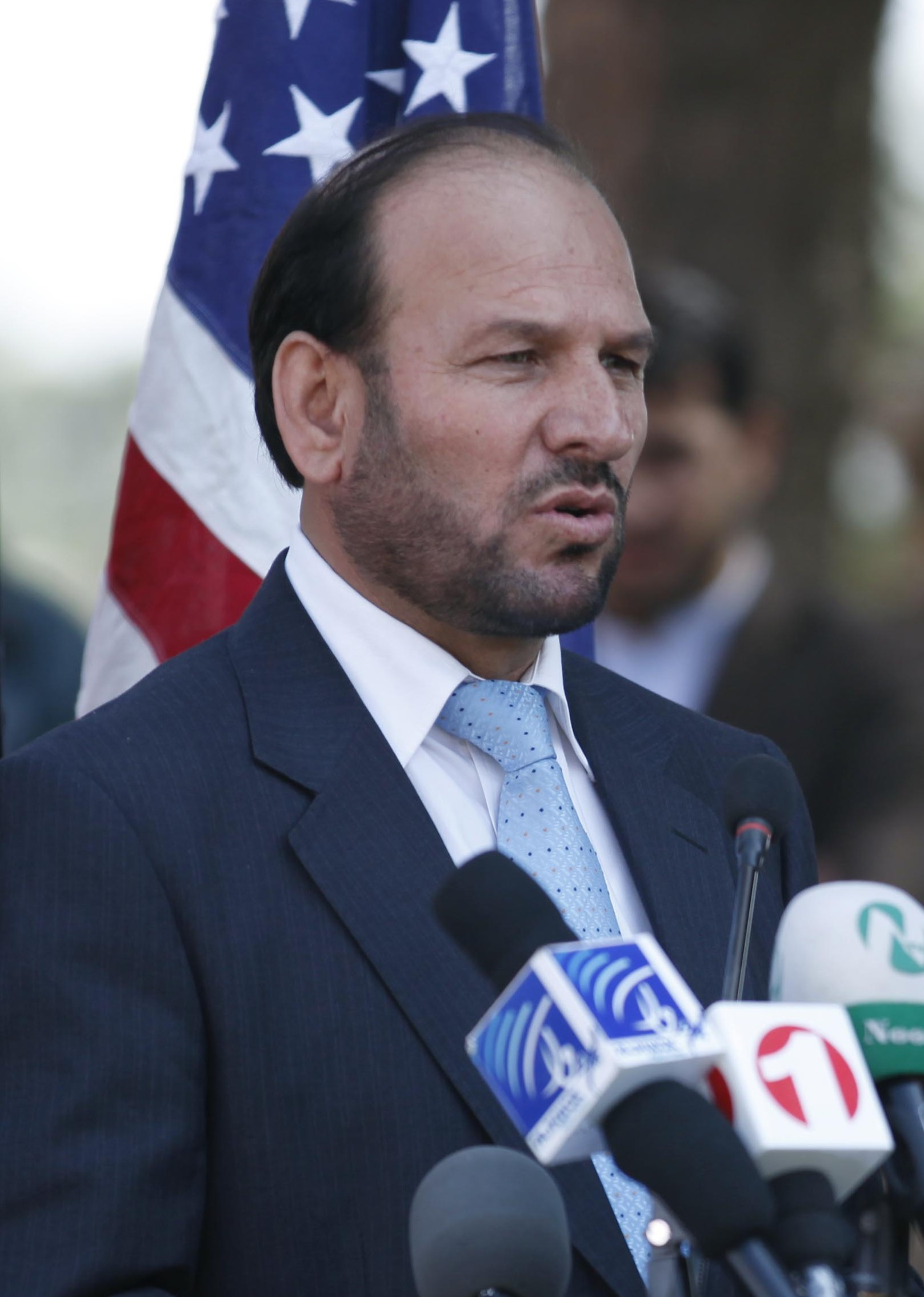
- Abdul Basir Salangi speaking in 2011

Governor of Farah
- Incumbent
- Assumed office January 28, 2018
- President: Ashraf Ghani
- Preceded by: Muhammad Arif Shah Jahan

Governor of Parwan
- In office 6 May 2009 – 8 June 2015
- Succeeded by: Mohammad Asim Asim

Personal details
- Born: 1962 (age 63–64) Salang, Parwan Province, Afghanistan
- Party: Jamiat-e Islami
- Ethnicity: Tajik

Abdul Basir Salangi or Abdul Baseer Salangi, born on 8 August 1962 in Parwan, is the ethnic Tajik who has been a former Governor of Farah province in Afghanistan, and a commander in the Afghan Civil War, aligned with Jamiat-e Islami and Ahmad Shah Massoud. Additionally, he was chief of Kabul after the 2001 fall of the Taliban regime, until he was replaced by General Baba Jan after being indicted in the Shinpur scandal.

== Karzai administration ==
Following the fall of the Taliban government in 2001, Salangi was appointed as the chief of police for Kabul. However the Afghan Independent Human Rights Commission accused him of bulldozing 300 poor houses in the Shinpur district of Kabul, to clear land for building houses for warlords. Following this Salangi was removed from his post and assigned as Police Chief of the volatile Wardak Province where he stayed until 2005. In 2008 Salangi was posted as governor of Parwan.

In 2010, as governor, he directed rescue efforts in the region after an avalanche struck the province.

=== Assassination attempts ===
Salangi has been a target of assassination attempts like many other Afghan politicians and government officials. On August 14, 2011, a team of about six suicide bombers launched a coordinated assault on the governor's palace in Charikar. Although Salangi survived the high-profile assault, 19 other people were killed in the incident. The attack began with a car bomb explosion outside the front gate of his palace followed by suicide bombers storming in and blowing themselves up in the compound. Gen. Abdul Jalil Rahimi of the Afghan National Police said he was at a meeting with Salangi, Afghan army and police officials, and at least two NATO police advisers, when the assault began. He further said that "two of the bombers were able to get into the building of the governor's house", but were killed before they could reach their main targets. The Taliban claimed responsibility for the attack.

== Second Resistance ==
In January 2021, while addressing a memorial ceremony for the victims of the 14 January 1989 massacre in the Salang district of central Parwan Province, Salangi said that 'if the Taliban were unwilling to embrace peace, the people of Afghanistan would form a second resistance front against them'.

Preceded by	Governor of Parwan Province, Afghanistan; 6 May 2009–8 June 2015	Incumbent
