= Khalilullah Khalili =

Afghan Persian writer and poet (1907–1987)

- Khalilollah Khalili on the cover of "Deewaan-e Khalilullah Khalili"
- Born: 1907; Kabul Province, Afghanistan
- Died: 1987 (aged 79–80); Islamabad, Pakistan
- Writing career
- Language: Persian
- Genre: Poetry
- Notable work: Hero of Khorasan

Khalilullah Khalili (1907–1987; Persian: خلیل‌الله خلیلی - Ḫalīlallāḥ Ḫalīlī; alternative spellings: Khalilollah, Khalil Ullah) was Afghanistan's foremost 20th century poet as well as a noted historian, university professor, diplomat and royal confidant. He was the last of the great classical Persian poets and among the first to introduce modern Persian poetry and Nimai style to Afghanistan. He had also expertise in Khorasani style and was a follower of Farrukhi Sistani. Almost alone among Afghanistan's poets, he enjoyed a following in Iran where his selected poems have been published. His works have been praised by renowned Iranian literary figures and intellectuals. Many see him as the greatest contemporary poet of the Persian language in Afghanistan. He is also known for his major work "Hero of Khorasan", a controversial biography of Habībullāh Kalakānī, Emir of Afghanistan in 1929.

== Life ==
Khalili was born in Kabul Province to an ethnic Tajik family. His father, Mirzā Muhammad Hussein, a Tajik from the village of Sayyed Khel in Parwan Province, was King Habibullah Khan's finance minister and owned mansions in Kabul and Jalalabad, but was later dismissed and hanged by Habibullah Khan's son and successor, Amanullah Khan. His mother was the daughter of Abdul Qādir Khān, a regional Safi tribal leader. She died when Khalili was seven.

Khalili lived and attended school in Kabul until he was 11, when Shāh Habibullāh Khān, king of Afghanistan, was assassinated, purportedly at the behest of his reformist son Amānullāh Khān, who quickly arrested and executed Khalili's father among others associated with the previous regime. Orphaned and unwanted in Kabul, he spent the turbulent years of Amānullāh's reign in the Shamālī Plain north of Kabul where he studied classical literature and other traditional writings under moonlight, it is believed he was self taught, and began writing poetry. In 1929, when Habībullāh Kalakānī – a local Tajik from Kalakan – deposed Amānullāh Khān, Khalili joined his uncle Abdul Rahim Khan Safi, the new governor of Herat, where he remained for more than 10 years.

In the early 1940s, he followed his uncle Abdul Rahim Khan Safi, who had been appointed a deputy prime minister, to Kabul. His stay in Kabul was cut short when, in 1944, some elders of the Safi-Clan rebelled and both uncle and nephew were imprisoned. After a year in prison, Khalili was released and exiled to Kandahar where he flourished as a poet and writer.

In the 1950s, Khalili was allowed to return to Kabul, where he was appointed as minister of culture and information and began teaching at Kabul University. He became a confidant to King Zahir Shah whom he often joined on hunting expeditions.

In the 1960s and 1970s, Khalili, who was fluent in Arabic, served as Afghanistan's ambassador to Saudi Arabia and Iraq. He was a member of the 1964 Constitutional Assembly and a representative from Jabal al-Siraj.

Following the April 1978 Communist coup, Khalili sought asylum first in West Germany and then in the United States where he wrote much of his most powerful poetry about the war in his native land. In the late 1980s, he moved to Islamabad, Pakistan, where he spent his final years. He was buried in Peshawar next to the tomb of the Pashto poet Rahman Baba. His remains were moved to Afghanistan in 2016.

== Works ==
Khalili was a prolific writer, producing over the course of his career an eclectic repertoire ranging from poetry to fiction to history to biography. He published 35 volumes of poetry, including his celebrated works "Aškhā wa Ḫūnhā" ("Tears And Blood"), composed during the Soviet occupation, and "Ayyār-e az Ḫorāsān" ("Hero of Khorasan"). With the exception of a selection of his quatrains and the recent An Assembly of Moths, his poetry remains largely unknown to English-speaking readers.

== See also ==
- Persian poetry
- Massoud Khalili (son)
- Nima Yushij
- Wasef Bakhtari
