= Salahuddin Rabbani =

Afghan diplomat and politician (born 1971)

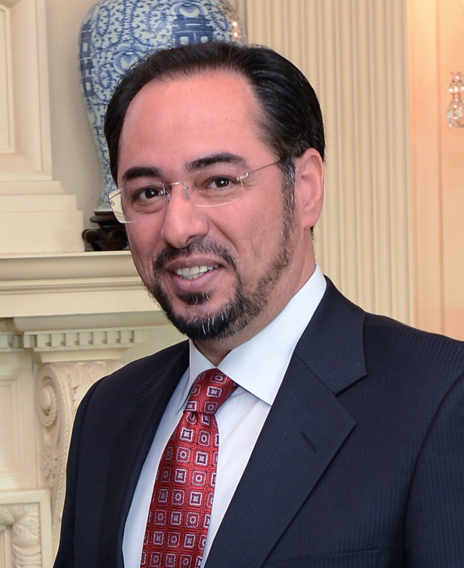
- Rabbani in 2012

Minister of Foreign Affairs of Afghanistan
- In office 1 February 2015 – 23 October 2019
- President: Ashraf Ghani
- Preceded by: Ahmad Moqbel Zarar
- Succeeded by: Idrees Zaman (acting)

Chairman of the Afghan High Peace Council
- In office 15 April 2012 – 1 February 2015
- President: Hamid Karzai; Ashraf Ghani
- Preceded by: Burhanuddin Rabbani
- Succeeded by: Ahmed Gailani

Ambassador of Afghanistan to Turkey
- In office 1 January 2011 – 14 April 2012
- President: Hamid Karzai
- Preceded by: Massoud Khalili
- Succeeded by: Amanullah Jayhoon

Personal details
- Born: 10 May 1971 (age 55) Kabul, Afghanistan
- Party: Jamiat-e Islami
- Children: 5
- Parent: Burhanuddin Rabbani (father)
- Education: Kingston University, Columbia University
- Profession: Diplomat

Salahuddin Rabbani (Note: Persian: صلاح‌الدین ربانی, romanized: Salāhuddīn Rabbānī) (born 10 May 1971) is an Afghan diplomat and politician who was the Minister of Foreign Affairs of Afghanistan from February 2015 to October 2019. He is also the owner of the Noor television network.

He was the Afghan ambassador to Turkey in 2011-2012. In April 2012, it was announced that he was to chair the Afghan High Peace Council in its negotiations with the Taliban.

== Early life ==
Salahuddin Rabbani was born on 10 May 1971 in Kabul, Afghanistan. Salahuddin's father was former Afghan High Peace Council chairman and Afghan President Burhanuddin Rabbani. His father was assassinated by a suicide bomber entering his home in 2011.

He received an undergraduate degree in management and marketing from the King Fahd University of Petroleum and Minerals in Saudi Arabia in 1995. In 2000, he received a Master's Degree in business management from Kingston University in the United Kingdom. From 2006 until 2008, he attended Columbia University's School of International and Public Affairs (SIPA) to earn an MA in international Affairs.

== Career ==
=== Private business and diplomacy ===
In the 1990s he worked in the financial accounting department of Saudi Aramco, and in 1996 he moved to the United Arab Emirates to work in the private sector. After 2000 he joined Afghan Ministry of Foreign Affairs. In that role, he served as the political counselor in New York to the Permanent Mission of Afghanistan to the United Nation. HE worked on issues relating to the UN Security Council, and also was the representation of Afghanistan at the First Committee of the United Nations' General Assembly on Disarmament and International Security.

Around 2008, he moved from the United States to Afghanistan to serve as a political advisor to his father.

=== Ambassador to Turkey ===
In 2010, he was appointed Afghanistan's ambassador to Turkey, serving in that position from 2011 to 2012. He was selected as leader of the Jamiat-e Islami political party after the assassination of his father on 20 September 2011. He was ambassador from 1 January 2011 until 14 April 2012.

=== Afghan High Peace Council ===
After he was appointed to the role in March 2012, in April 2012, it was announced that he was to chair the Afghan High Peace Council in its negotiations with the Taliban. He was chairman from 15 April 2012 until 1 February 2015.

=== Foreign minister of Afghanistan ===
On 12 January 2015, he was nominated by President Ashraf Ghani as Minister of Foreign Affairs, replacing Ahmad Moqbel Zarar. He was confirmed by the Afghan Parliament on 28 January and was sworn in on 1 February. On 21 March 2017, he spoke at a meeting organised by the Atlantic Council think-tank in Washington, D.C.

Rabbani resigned on 23 October 2019, accusing Ghani of sidelining him and creating parallel structures that impeded the functioning of legitimate government institutions. Ghani appointed Idrees Zaman as the acting foreign minister to replace Rabbani on 30 October.

== Television station ==
Logo of Noor Television

Rabbani owns Noor TV, a television network broadcasting out of Kabul. The Taliban government banned this channel in 2024.

== See also ==
- Ministry of Foreign Affairs (Afghanistan)

== Notes ==
Political offices
Preceded by Ahmad Moqbel Zarar	Foreign Minister of Afghanistan; 2015–2019	Succeeded by Idrees Zaman; Acting
