= Ministry of Counter Narcotics =

Government ministry of Afghanistan

- Pashto: د مخدره موادو پر ضد وزارت; Persian: وزارت مبارزه عليه مواد مخدر

Agency overview
- Jurisdiction: Government of Afghanistan
- Ministers responsible: unknown, Minister of Counter Narcotics; Abdul Haq Akhund, Deputy Minister of Counter Narcotics
- Website: mcn.gov.af

The Ministry of Counter Narcotics (Pashto: د مخدره موادو پر ضد وزارت; Persian: وزارت مبارزه عليه مواد مخدر) was a ministry within the government of Afghanistan.

The ministry led the coordination, policy-making, monitoring and evaluation of all counter-narcotics activities and efforts. All activities were carried out in view of the Constitution of Afghanistan, the Afghan Drug Law and Afghanistan's National Drug Control Strategy (NDCS).

The role of Minister of Counter Narcotics has been described as the world's toughest job.

Following the Taliban's reassertion of power in Afghanistan, Ministry of Counter Narcotics was transformed into a Deputy Ministry within the Ministry of Interior Affairs.

== Functions ==
Opium production in Afghanistan exceeds by far the opium produced in the rest of the world. The ministry had the lead on coordinating and evaluating the Afghan Drug Law and the NDCS.

The ministry has eight pillars of activity:

- institution building
- law enforcement
- international and regional cooperation
- eradication
- public awareness
- alternative livelihoods
- criminal justice
- demand reduction

There are four published priorities for activity:

# Disrupting the drugs trade by targeting traffickers and their backers and eliminating the basis for the trade.

1. Strengthening and diversifying legal rural livelihoods.
2. Reducing the demand for illicit drugs and treatment of problem drug users.
3. Strengthening state institutions both at the centre and in the provinces The Government intends to spend the preponderance of its resources and energy on these four priority areas.

== Ministers ==
- Zarar Ahmad Osmani (Zarar Ahmad Moqbel) 2009–2013
- Mobarez Rashidi 2013–2015
- Salamat Azimi 2015–2021

Former Ministers of Counternarcotis / Narcotic Affairs/ Minister of Counter Narcotics MCN MoCN:

- Eng. Habibullah Qaderi (Zabul) (2005),
- General Khodaidad (20080302), (Khodaidad had been serving as acting minister before),
- Zarar Ahmad Moqbel Muqbel Muqbil Osmani (was named acting Minister of Foreign Affairs) (2010 -20131028) )
- Din Mohammad Mubarez Din Mohammad Mobariz Rashidi (20131225-20140930)
- Din Mohammad Mobariz Rashidi Acting Minister of Counter Narcotics (20141001)
- acting Minister of Counter Narcotics Harun Alrashid Shirzad Haroon Rashid Sherzad (20141209)
- Mrs. Salamat Azimi (20150418)

Ministry dissolved 20190128

Deputy Ministers Counter Narcotics:

- Dr. Mohammad Zafar (20091116),
- Gen Baaz Mohammad Ahmadi (20110411)
- Mohammad Ibrahim Azhar (20111027)
- Haroon Rashid Sherzad for Policy and Coordination (20131213, 20140209)

== See also ==
- Council of Ministers (Afghanistan)
