= Salamat Azimi =

Afghan politician (born 1965)

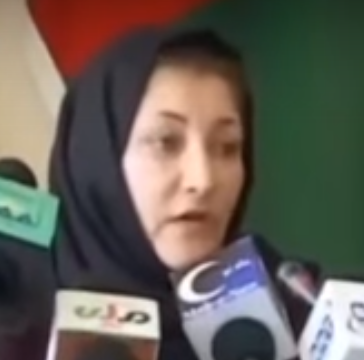
- Born: 1965 (age 60–61); Andkhoy, Faryab, Afghanistan
- Education: Kabul University; Payame Noor University
- Occupations: Law professor; politician
- Employer: Balkh University

Counter Narcotics Minister
- In office 21 April 2015 – 15 August 2021
- President: Ashraf Ghani

Salamat Azimi (Dari: سلامت عظیمی; born 1965) is an Afghan politician who served as Counter Narcotics Minister.

== Early life and education ==
Azimi was born in Andkhoy District of Faryab Province in 1965. She is an ethnic Uzbek. She attended Abu-Muslim Khurasani High School and received a BA in law and political science from Kabul University. She received a master's degree from Iran's Payame Noor University in 2014.

== Career ==
Azimi was a professor in law and political science and head of the criminal law department at Balkh University. She was a member of the national peace consultative jirga of Balkh in 2011 and a member of the traditional Loya jirga from Balkh Province in 2012. From 2011 to 2015, she was in charge of protection of children's rights for northern Afghanistan, working at the Afghan Independent Human Rights Commission in Mazar-i-Sharif. She also worked as a director for Aryana Legal Organization.

Azimi was appointed as Minister of Counter Narcotics by President Ashraf Ghani on 21 April 2015. She was viewed by the United States as a "Dostum" appointee. The role has been described as the world's toughest job. In July 2015, Azimi said that 3.5 million people in Afghanistan were addicts, and in 2016, opium cultivation increased by 10%.

In November 2016, the Wolesi Jirga dismissed seven cabinet members over four days during impeachment hearings. Azimi obtained a vote of confidence, with 71 votes.

United Nations Office on Drugs and Crime (UNODC) has been working with the Afghan Ministry for Counter Narcotics. Together they organized a two-day conference on "Promoting Afghanistan's Alternative Development Initiatives among Regional and International Partners" in Ashgabat, Turkmenistan. Professor Salamat Azimi, Afghanistan's Minister for Counter Narcotics, informed the conference about her government's policies to upkeep this goal. Other countries participating in the conference were Pakistan, Tajikistan, Uzbekistan, Kazakhstan, Iran, Turkmenistan, Thailand and Colombia. The United States, Russia, Japan and the European Union also supported the conference.

== Personal life ==
Azimi is married and has five children.
