= Kohi Safi District =

Kohi Safi کوه صافی
- District
- Location in Afghanistan
- Coordinates: 34.7953°N 69.5261°E
- Country: Afghanistan
- Province: Parwan Province

Population
  - Religions: Islam
- Time zone: + 4.30

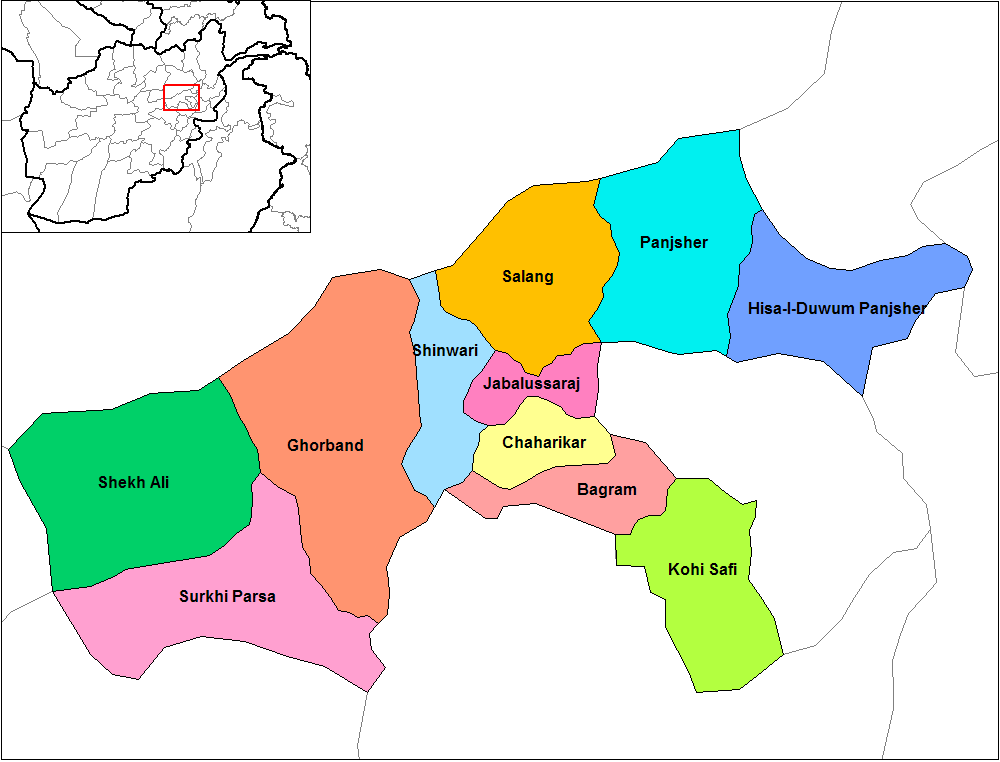
Districts of Parwan

Kohi Safi District (Pashto: د کوهي صافي ولسوالۍ) is now one of the major historical districts located in South-eastern Parwan province, Kohi Safi district is one of the most single districts where almost all of the region is populated by Safi tribe. Although in 1930s Kohi Safi was said to be one of the second most populous district of Parwan after Charakar, but during 1930s-1940s the region was depopulated due to Governments pressure to evacuation of area due to Saf's War on the King. Majority of its population were displaced or escaped further in the north away from borders of capital Kabul, few escaped to west in modern Herat and many into India (After 1947 came to be Pakistan). The root of the conflict seems to be started due to King Amanuallah Khan's proposal of modernization, Safi and with few other Afghan tribes armed against the ruling family of Durrani. Although some annalists assume the other factor behind the conflict and rise of Safi was mainly due to Safi not being of ruling Durrani tribe, but rather Shinwari. Although Majority of Shinwari's enjoyed presence of Durrani and many were often involved into Government compare to those of Ghilzai, however Safis are always known to have history of conflict with many ruling governments and empires.

== History and population ==
The Kohi Safi district is mainly a mountain area, considered to be a small region of the greater Kohistan region. The name of the district was known to have been mentioned going back as far as the 15th century, it was Sikandar Lodi's personal physician Qulam Adam Mohammad Shahid Mirza mentioning that someone should be sent to Kabul in the land of Saphystan to bring Herbal medicine. Perhaps the Indian medician's Islamic name "Laooq Sapistan" derived its name from Saphystan of greater Kabul also known as Kabulistan. Kohi Safi along with most of Eastern regions of Parwan region which was part of greater Kohistan region was also well known during Moghal era as the Saphystan land of Safi. Although the modern Kohi Safi district is smaller both in size and population, but prior to Safi war it carried a much larger population.

== Rebuilding ==
Prior to the rule of Mohammed Nadir Shah majority of Safi and including high class ruling tribal leaders used to settle in Kohi Safi, during the invasion of the Soviets, Kohi Safi was further depopulated, and many infrastructures were destroyed. During the Taliban, Kohi Safi along with Khan Tota was where the Taliban have concentrated their resources, both districts came under heavy bombing during the US air offensives in 2001. From 2001 to 2003 the roads from Kabul to Kohi-Safi were known to be heaven for robbers, gangsters, and anti-US militants, ever since 2004 with many elected members of Safi Clan in the government, many projects were proposed, to make Safi district the next Kardi-see of Kabul. Although major developments are on the way, so far major roads, clean water, and part-time electricity, has been provided to the people of Kohi Safi.

== See also ==
- Districts of Afghanistan
