= Charikar District =

Charikar چاریکار
- District
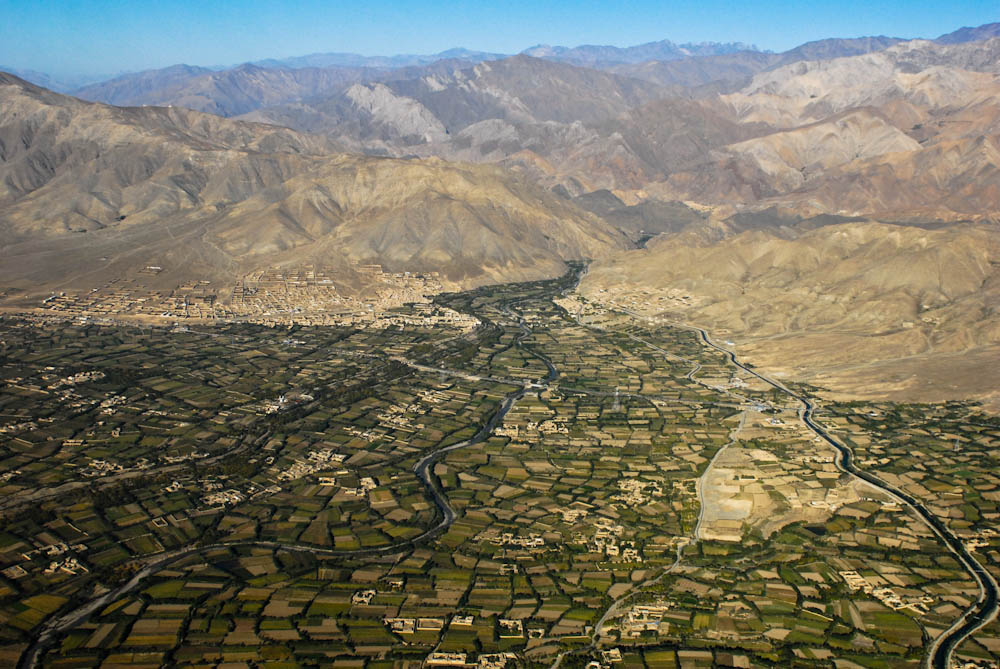
- Beside the Golbahar River

- Location in Afghanistan
- Coordinates: 34.9477°N 69.3116°E
- Country: Afghanistan
- Province: Parwan
- Capital: Charikar
- Time zone: UTC+04:30 (Afghanistan Time)

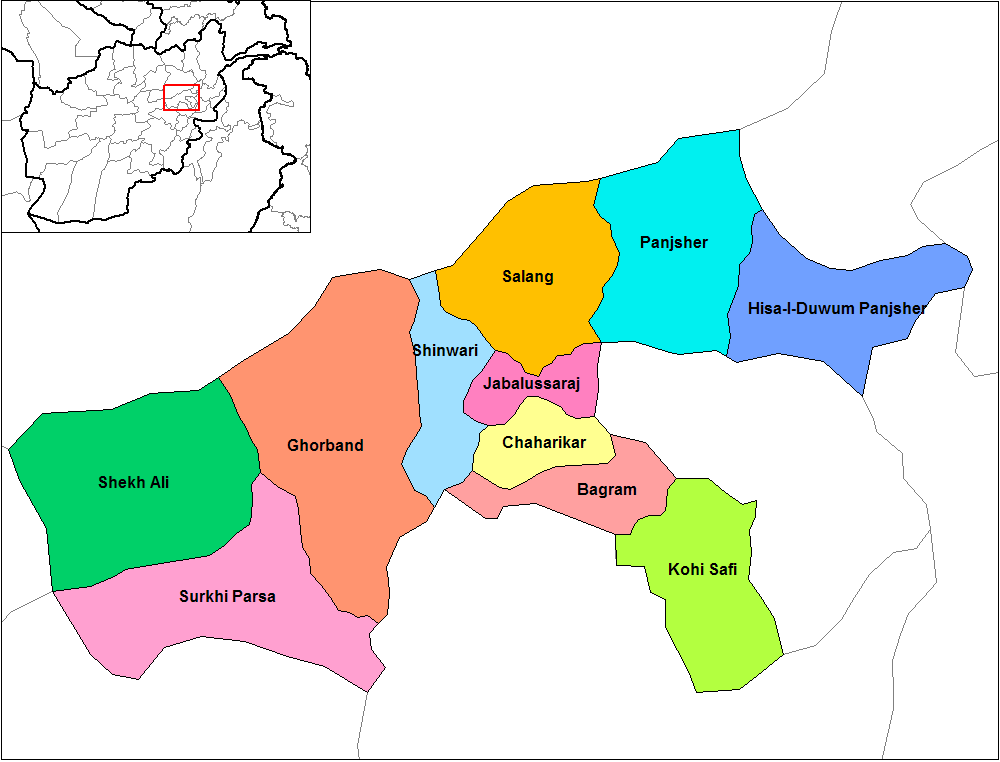
Charikar District in the Parwan Province map

Charikar (Pashto: چاریکار Dari: چاریکار) is one of the districts of Parwan province in Afghanistan. It has an estimated population of around 198,306 residents (2019). They belong to various ethnic groups and use Dari as lingua franca. The district's capital is Charikar.

== See also ==
- Charikar
- Districts of Afghanistan
