= Abdul Haq Akhund =

Afghan Deputy Interior Minister for Counter Narcotics since 2021

Mullah Abdul Haq Hamkar Akhund عبدالحق آخوند

Deputy Minister of Interior Affairs for Counter Narcotics
- Incumbent
- Assumed office 7 September 2021 (Note: Acting: 7 September 2021 – 15 August 2025)
- Leader: Hibatullah Akhundzada
- Minister: Sirajuddin Haqqani

Personal details
- Party: Taliban
- Occupation: Politician, Taliban member

Mullah Abdul Haq Hamkar Akhund (Pashto: عبدالحق آخوند [ˈabdʊl haq ɑˈxund]), also spelt Abdul Haq Akhand or Abdulhaq Akhund, is the Deputy Interior Minister for Counter Narcotics of the Islamic Emirate of Afghanistan since 7 September 2021.

== Career ==
On 6 September 2021, Akhund met with President of the International Committee of the Red Cross (ICRC) Peter Maurer in Kabul and informed him about the current problems and challenges in Afghanistan in the healthcare sector, to which the ICRC promised its assistance.

On 7 September 2021, Akhund was made Deputy Interior Minister for Counter Narcotics of the Islamic Emirate of Afghanistan.
