= Jabal Saraj District =

Jabal Saraj جبل‌سراج
- District
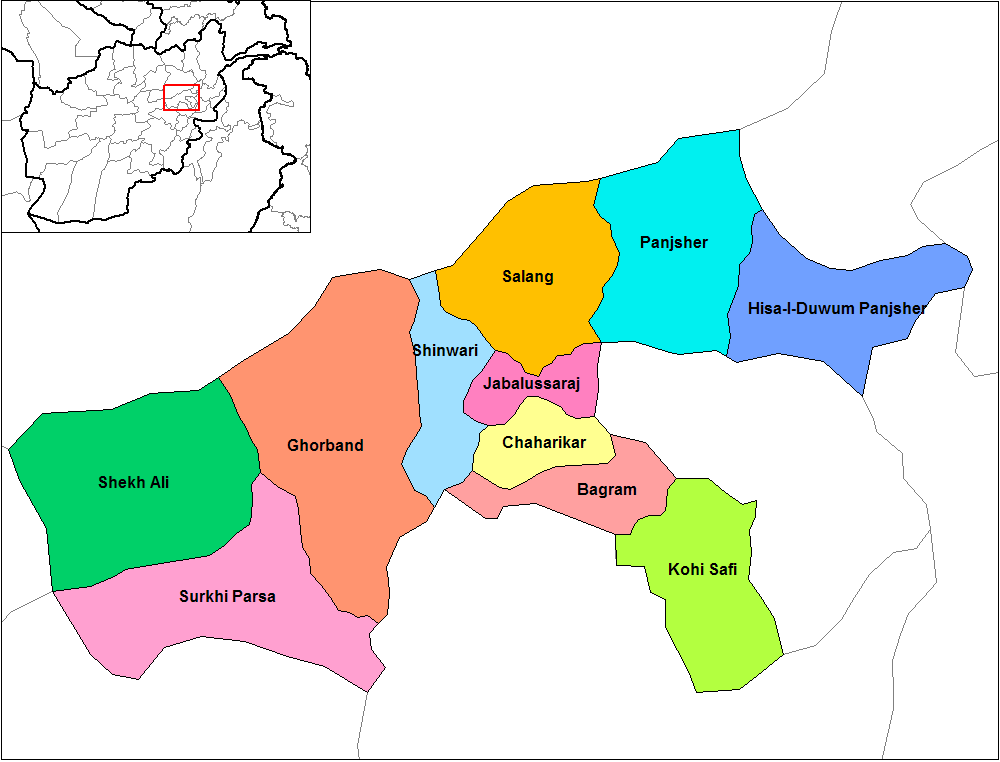
- Jabal Saraj District, Parwan Province

- Location within Afghanistan
- Coordinates: 35.0657°N 69.2639°E
- Country: Afghanistan
- Province: Parwan
- Capital: Jabal Saraj

Population (2002)
  - Total: 120,000
- Time zone: UTC+4:30 (AFT)

Jabal Sarāj or Jabal al-Sirāj (Dari: جبل‌سراج) is one of the districts of Afghanistan located in the Parwan Province. Jabul Saraj is near Charikar, Gulbahar and the Salang Pass. It is surrounded by the high peaks of mountains. During the summers, many residents of Kabul and other provinces visit Jabal Saraj for site seeing and picnic purposes. The capital of the district is the town of Jabal Saraj.

Jabal Saraj is a historic village of Afghanistan named by Habibullah Khan in the beginning of the 20th century as this district was one of the favorite sightseeing areas for the King with a special palace for the summer. Jabal Saraj's economy relies on a textile factory, built in 1937, a cement factory and agriculture. The grand historic palace, built in 1907, was rebuilt in 2019 and opened as the Museum of Afghan Jihad and Resistance, about the anti-Soviet war resistance.

== See also ==
- Districts of Afghanistan
- Valleys of Afghanistan
