= Baghlan University =

University in Baghlan, Afghanistan

- پوهنتون بغلان / د بغلان پوهنتون
- President: Mawlawi Sediqullah Khalid Mansoor
- Location: Puli Khumri, Baghlan, Afghanistan
- Website: baghlan.edu.af

Baghlan University (Note: Pashto: د بغلان پوهنتون Dari: پوهنتون بغلان) is a public university in Puli Khumri, which is the capital of Baghlan Province in northern Afghanistan. It was established in 1993 as Hakim Naser Khesraw University but closed down during the Islamic Emirate of Afghanistan (1996–2001). The university resumed operation in 2003 during the Transitional Islamic State of Afghanistan. Since 2007 the university has been rebuilt and expanded.

Baghlan University is under Afghanistan's Ministry of Higher Education, considered as one of the 5 best universities in the country.

== Faculties ==
The following faculties are currently available at Baghlan University:

1. Education
2. Language and Literature
3. Agriculture
4. Economics
5. Engineering
6. Islamic
