= Mohammad Farid Omar =

Governor of Parwan province

Mullah Mohammad Farid Omar
- Pashto: ملا محمد فرید عمر

Governor of Parwan
- Incumbent
- Assumed office August 2021
- Prime Minister: Hasan Akhund
- Emir: Hibatullah Akhundzada
- Preceded by: Fazluddin Ayyar

Mullah Mohammad Farid Omar (Pashto: ملا محمد فرید عمر) is an Afghan Taliban politician who is currently serving as Governor of Parwan province since 2021.
