= List of governors of Parwan =

This is a list of the governors of the province of Parwan, Afghanistan.

== Governors of Parwan Province ==
Governor		Period	Extra	Note
?	- -			
Abdul Basir Salangi	6 May 2009; 8 June 2015			
Mohammad Asim Asim	8 June 2015; 4 February 2018			
Fazluddin Ayyar	- August 2021			
Mullah Mohammad Farid Omar	2021; Present			

== See also ==
- List of current governors of Afghanistan
