= Sayed Khel District =

Sayed Khel سیدخیل
- District
- Location within Afghanistan
- Country: Afghanistan
- Province: Parwan

Population
  - Religions: Islam

Sayed Khel (Pashto: سیدخیل) is a district of Parwan province, Afghanistan.

== See also ==
- Districts of Afghanistan
