= Charikar =

Charikar: چاریکار (Dari); چاریکار (Pashto); Imam Azam Imam Abu Hanifa
- Provincial capital
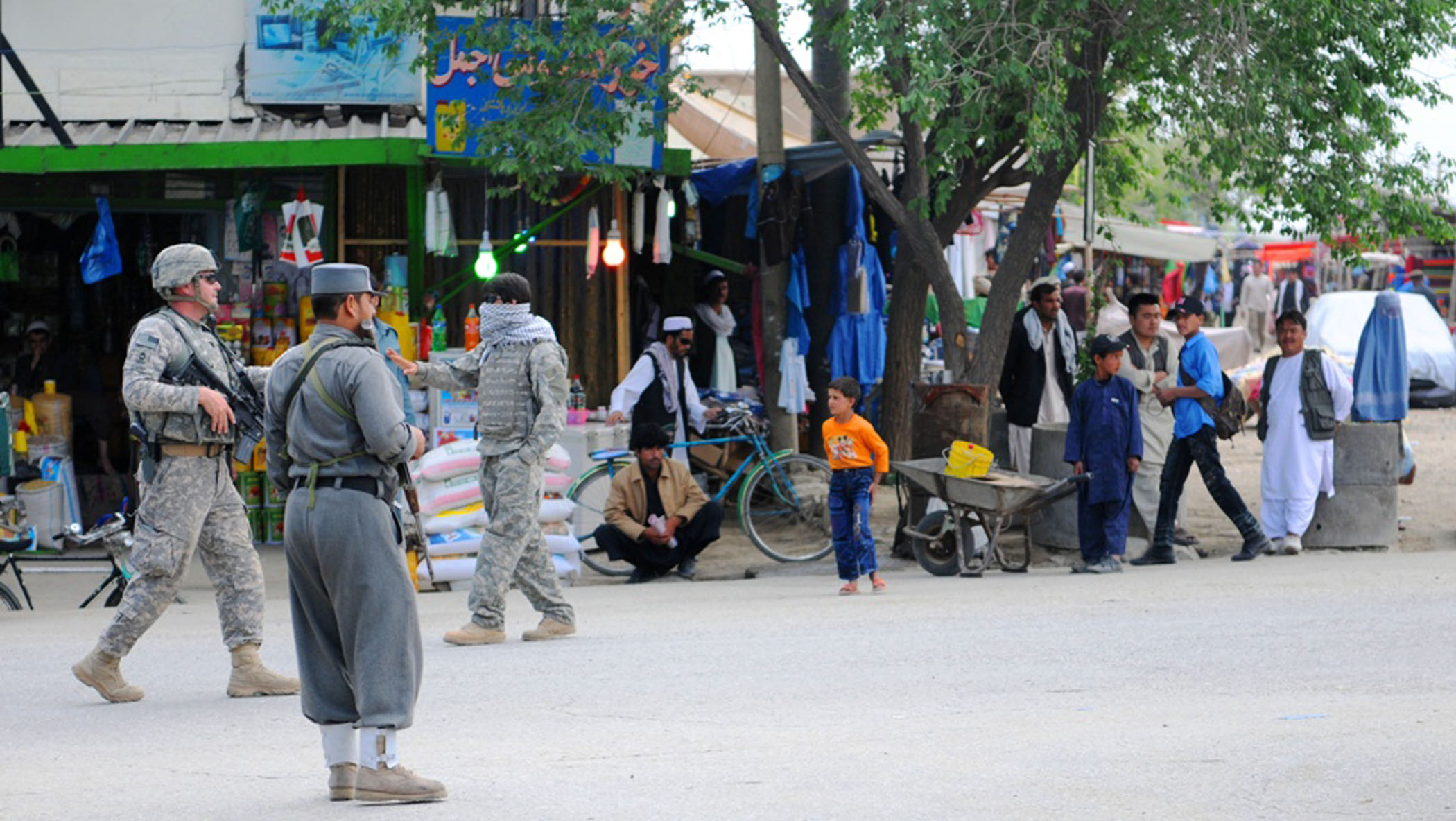
- A street in Charikar during the war in Afghanistan, 2007

- Location in Afghanistan
- Coordinates: 35°0′47″N 69°10′8″E
- Country: Afghanistan
- Province: Parwan
- District: Charikar

Government
  - Type: Municipality
  - Mayor: Hafiz Raz Mohammad Yasir
- Elevation: 1,600 m (5,200 ft)

Population (2025)
  - Provincial capital: 222,751
  - Urban: 74,189
- Time zone: UTC+04:30 (Afghanistan Time)

Charikar, (Note: English: /tʃɑːriːˈkɑːr/ chahr-ee-KAHR; Pashto: چاریکار, romanized: Čārikār, pronounced [tʃɑriˈkɑɾ]; Dari: چاریکار, romanized: Čārīkār, cyrillized: Чорикор, pronounced [tʃʰɑːɾiːˈkɑːɾ]) also known as Imam Abu Hanifa (Note: Pashto: امام ابو حنیفه, romanized: Imām Abu Hanifa, pronounced [ʔɪˈmɑm ʔɐˌbu (h)ɐni'pa]; Dari: امام ابو حنیفه, romanized: Imām Abū Hanīfa, cyrillized: Имом Абу Ҳанифа, pronounced [ʔɪˈmɑːm ʔɐˌbuː (ɦ)ɐniːˈfa]) (Note: The Islamic Emirate of Afghanistan had announced proposals, intending to rename the town of Charikar to "Imam Abu Hanifa" in late 2021, after the Muslim scholar who was native to the place. However, this name has not been widely adopted nor officially recognized, as most Afghan sources still recognize the town's name as "Charikar" officially, and the name still remains widespread in Afghan media.) or Imam Azam, (Note: Pashto: امام اعظم, romanized: Imām Azam, pronounced [ʔɪˈmɑm ʔɐ(ʔ)ˈzam]; Dari: امام اعظم, romanized: Imām A’zam, cyrillized: Имом Аъзам, pronounced [ʔɪˈmɑːm ʔɐ(ʔ)ˈzam]) is a city in the northeastern area of Afghanistan, serving as the capital of Parwan Province. It is within the jurisdiction of Charikar District and has an estimated population of 222,751 people. They include various ethnic groups of Afghanistan. The mayor of the city is Hafiz Raz Mohammad Yasir.

Charikar was officially renamed in December 2022 to honor the 8th-century Sunni Muslim theologian and jurist Abu Hanifa, who is also sometimes called Imam Azam ("The Great Imam") and was the founder of the Hanafi school of Islamic law. The city lies on the Afghanistan Ring Road, 69 km (43 mi) from Kabul along the route to the northern provinces. Travelers would pass the city when traveling to Mazar-i-Sharif, Kunduz or Puli Khumri. Despite the proximity to Kabul, slightly more than half of the land is not built-up. Of the built-up land, almost equal parts are residential (37%) and vacant plots (32%), with a grid network of road coverage amounting to 19% of built-up land area, as of 2015. The city is at the gateway to the Panjshir Valley, where the Shamali plains meet the foothills of the Hindu Kush, and is known for its pottery and high-quality grapes. It has four police districts (nahias) and a total land area of 3,025 ha (11.68 sq mi).

== History ==
In 1221, the Battle of Parwan was fought near Charikar, in which Jalal al-Din Mangburni with a large army defeated a column of 30,000 soldiers of the invading Mongols. He later escaped into the northern Punjab, and avoided the immediate consequences of the fall of the Khwarezmid Empire.

At the beginning of the 19th century, Charikar became a flourishing commercial town of several thousand inhabitants. Charikar was the location of major battle during the First Anglo-Afghan War. In 1841 a British garrison was massacred by Afghans led by Mir Masjidi Khan, and the Anglo-Indian army officer Major Eldred Pottinger was badly wounded.

During the Soviet–Afghan War (1979–1989), the region around Charikar saw fierce fighting. Some areas around Charikar served as a stronghold of the Liberation Organization of the People of Afghanistan (SAMA). Charikar was at the front line between Ahmad Shah Massoud's Northern Alliance and the Taliban who captured Kabul in 1996. Charikar, Jabal Saraj District and Gulbahar were captured in January of 1997.

On 14 August 2011, a team of about six suicide bombers attacked the governor's palace in Charikar. The Governor Abdul Basir Salangi survived but 19 people were killed to which the Taliban claimed responsibility.

On 19 May 2020, gunmen opened fire inside a mosque in Charikar, killing 11 worshipers and injuring 16 others when they were offering the evening prayer after breaking their Ramadan fast. The Taliban denied involvement in the attack.

In late August 2020, the city was the site of floods that killed at least 92 people.

Following the Taliban takeover of Afghanistan in 2021, the Taliban provincial governor of Parwan province announced in December 2022 that the name of the city would be changed. One news source said the new name of the town was "Imam Abu Hanifa", while another reported the new name as "Imam Azam". A government official from the former Afghan regime said the renaming was the beginning of an anti-Farsi campaign by the regime.

== Climate ==
Charikar has a humid continental climate (Köppen: Dsa) with hot summers and cold winters. The winter months are much rainier than the summer months. The warmest month of the year is July, with an average temperature of 25.0 °C (77.0 °F). January is the coldest month, with temperatures averaging −2.9 °C (26.8 °F).

Climate data for Charikar
Month	Jan	Feb	Mar	Apr	May	Jun	Jul	Aug	Sep	Oct	Nov	Dec	Year
Mean daily maximum °C (°F)	3.6 (38.5)	4.2 (39.6)	11.0 (51.8)	18.4 (65.1)	25.0 (77.0)	30.0 (86.0)	33.0 (91.4)	32.2 (90.0)	28.0 (82.4)	21.4 (70.5)	13.1 (55.6)	7.2 (45.0)	18.9 (66.1)
Daily mean °C (°F)	−2.9 (26.8)	−1.8 (28.8)	4.4 (39.9)	10.9 (51.6)	17.0 (62.6)	21.9 (71.4)	25.0 (77.0)	24.3 (75.7)	20.0 (68.0)	13.7 (56.7)	6.2 (43.2)	0.7 (33.3)	11.6 (52.9)
Mean daily minimum °C (°F)	−9.3 (15.3)	−7.8 (18.0)	−2.3 (27.9)	3.4 (38.1)	8.9 (48.0)	13.7 (56.7)	17.0 (62.6)	16.3 (61.3)	12.0 (53.6)	5.9 (42.6)	−0.7 (30.7)	−5.8 (21.6)	4.3 (39.7)
Average precipitation mm (inches)	50 (2.0)	72 (2.8)	73 (2.9)	51 (2.0)	23 (0.9)	6 (0.2)	2 (0.1)	1 (0.0)	3 (0.1)	9 (0.4)	20 (0.8)	29 (1.1)	339 (13.3)
Average relative humidity (%)	51	58	57	51	40	29	25	25	26	33	43	45	40
Source: Climate-Data.org

== Demographics ==
According to Afghanistan's National Statistics and Information Authority, Charikar has an estimated population of 222,751 people. They include various ethnic groups of Afghanistan. In 2015 there were about 10,671 dwellings in the city. Earlier figures provided 172,200 residents.

== See also ==
- List of cities in Afghanistan
