= Jabal Saraj =

Jabal Saraj جبل سراج
- Town
- Location
- Coordinates: 35.11833°N 69.23778°E
- Country: Afghanistan
- Province: Parwan Province
- District: Jabal Saraj District
- Elevation: 1,573 m (5,161 ft)
- Time zone: UTC+04:30 (Afghanistan Time)

Jabal Saraj (Dari/Pashto: جبل سراج) is a town in the Jabal Saraj District of Parwan Province, north of Kabul in Afghanistan. The main attraction in the town is the Jabal Saraj Palace, which was originally built by Amir Habibullah Khan in 1907.

== Climate ==
Jabal Saraj has a Mediterranean climate (Köppen climate classification Csa) with hot, dry summers and cold, wet winters. Snow is not unusual in winter. Nearby areas may have a cold semi-arid climate (Köppen climate classification BSk) or a humid continental climate (Köppen climate classification Dsa/Dsb) depending on altitude and topography.

Climate data for Jabal Saraj
| Month | Jan | Feb | Mar | Apr | May | Jun | Jul | Aug | Sep | Oct | Nov | Dec | Year |
|---|---|---|---|---|---|---|---|---|---|---|---|---|---|
| Record high °C (°F) | 17.4 (63.3) | 19.4 (66.9) | 26.6 (79.9) | 29.7 (85.5) | 34.0 (93.2) | 38.4 (101.1) | 36.7 (98.1) | 36.3 (97.3) | 35.4 (95.7) | 30.4 (86.7) | 24.7 (76.5) | 18.5 (65.3) | 38.4 (101.1) |
| Mean daily maximum °C (°F) | 5.5 (41.9) | 6.2 (43.2) | 13.2 (55.8) | 19.6 (67.3) | 24.4 (75.9) | 29.5 (85.1) | 31.7 (89.1) | 31.0 (87.8) | 27.6 (81.7) | 23.0 (73.4) | 15.5 (59.9) | 8.9 (48.0) | 19.7 (67.4) |
| Daily mean °C (°F) | 1.2 (34.2) | 2.6 (36.7) | 9.0 (48.2) | 15.1 (59.2) | 19.8 (67.6) | 25.3 (77.5) | 27.3 (81.1) | 26.3 (79.3) | 22.6 (72.7) | 17.2 (63.0) | 10.7 (51.3) | 4.2 (39.6) | 15.1 (59.2) |
| Mean daily minimum °C (°F) | −2.0 (28.4) | −0.3 (31.5) | 5.0 (41.0) | 10.9 (51.6) | 15.1 (59.2) | 20.7 (69.3) | 23.1 (73.6) | 21.9 (71.4) | 18.2 (64.8) | 12.8 (55.0) | 5.9 (42.6) | 0.8 (33.4) | 11.0 (51.8) |
| Record low °C (°F) | −15.4 (4.3) | −14.7 (5.5) | −5 (23) | 0.3 (32.5) | 6.0 (42.8) | 9.4 (48.9) | 14.7 (58.5) | 13.0 (55.4) | 6.4 (43.5) | 2.8 (37.0) | −2.4 (27.7) | −12.9 (8.8) | −15.4 (4.3) |
| Average precipitation mm (inches) | 60.7 (2.39) | 88.0 (3.46) | 107.6 (4.24) | 97.2 (3.83) | 29.8 (1.17) | 1.4 (0.06) | 3.0 (0.12) | 2.1 (0.08) | 3.3 (0.13) | 10.7 (0.42) | 21.2 (0.83) | 37.2 (1.46) | 462.2 (18.19) |
| Average rainy days | 2 | 5 | 10 | 10 | 6 | 1 | 1 | 1 | 1 | 3 | 3 | 3 | 46 |
| Average snowy days | 6 | 5 | 2 | 0 | 0 | 0 | 0 | 0 | 0 | 0 | 0 | 4 | 17 |
| Average relative humidity (%) | 56 | 59 | 49 | 48 | 38 | 26 | 28 | 27 | 26 | 33 | 37 | 51 | 40 |
| Mean monthly sunshine hours | 167.3 | 163.8 | 195.6 | 217.1 | 304.1 | 353.1 | 354.7 | 329.8 | 306.1 | 275.9 | 224.4 | 167.3 | 3,059.2 |
Source: NOAA (1961-1983)

== See also ==
- Tourism in Afghanistan
