= Parwan Province =

Province of Afghanistan

Parwan پروان
- Province
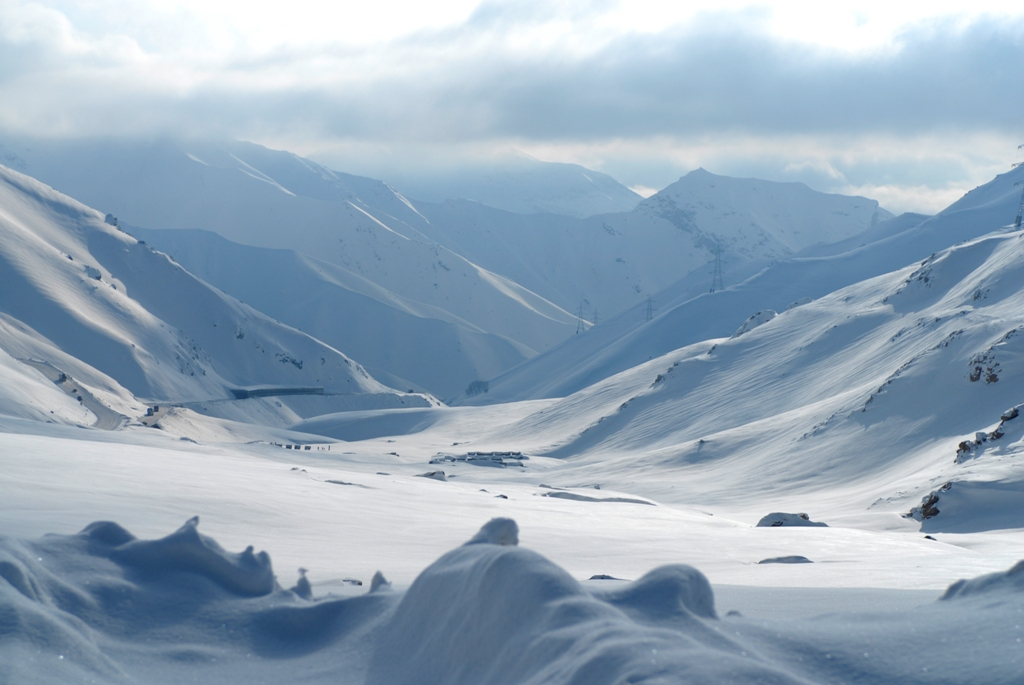
- The Salang Pass during winter

- Map of Afghanistan with Parwan highlighted
- Coordinates (Capital): 35.0°N 69.0°E
- Country: Afghanistan
- Capital: Charikar

Government
  - Governor: Mohammad Farid Omar
  - Deputy Governor: Maulvi Dost Mohammad Haqqani

Area
  - Total: 5,715 km^{2} (2,207 sq mi)

Population (2021)
  - Total: 751,040
  - Density: 131.4/km^{2} (340.4/sq mi)
- Time zone: UTC+4:30 (Afghanistan Time)
- Postal code: 11xx
- ISO 3166 code: AF-PAR
- Main languages: Dari and Pashto

Parwan (Note: Pashto: پروان, romanized: Parwān, pronounced [pɐɾˈwɑn]; Dari: پروان, romanized: Parwān, cyrillized: Парвон, pronounced [pʰɐɾˈwɑːn]) is one of the 34 provinces of Afghanistan. It is the largest province of the Greater Parwan region, and has a population of about 751,000. The province is multi-ethnic and is a mostly rural society. The province is divided into 10 districts. The town of Imam Abu Hanifa serves as the provincial capital. The province is located north of Kabul Province and south of Baghlan Province, west of Panjshir Province and Kapisa Province, and east of Maidan Wardak Province and Bamyan Province. The province's famous tourism attraction is the Golghondi Hill, also known as “the flower hill,” located in Imam Azam about an hour away from the capital city of Kabul. After Panjshir this province has been considered as one of the main raising points of Afghanistan War against Soviets.

The name Parwan is also attributed to a town, the exact location of which is now unknown, that supposedly existed during prehistory, in the nearby Hindu Kush mountains.

Despite a four-decade-long state of war in Afghanistan, Parwan was relatively free of conflict by the mid-2010s. While occasional attacks on government or international forces were reported, they were usually minor. Such incidents in Parwan mostly involved grenade attacks on the residences of government officials or roadside bombs. Bagram Air Base, which was one of the largest US military bases in Afghanistan, is located in Parwan.

== History ==
In 329 BC, Alexander the Great founded the settlement of Parwan as his Alexandria of the Caucasus. It was conquered by Arab Muslims in 792 AD. In 1221, the province was the site of the battle between the invading Mongols, led by Genghis Khan, and the Khwarazmian Empire led by Jalal al-Din Mangburni, where the Mongols were defeated.

The Kingdom of Kapisa (known in contemporary Chinese sources as Chinese: 漕國 Caoguo and Chinese: 罽賓 Jibin) was a state located in what is now Afghanistan during the late 1st millennium CE. Its capital was the city of Bagram. The kingdom stretched from the Hindu Kush in the north to Bamiyan and Kandahar in the south and west, out as far as the modern Jalalabad District in the east.

The famous Moroccan traveler and scholar, Ibn Battuta, visiting the area in 1333 write:

We halted next at a place called Banj Hir (Panjshir), which means "Five Mountains," where there was once a fine and populous city built on a great river with blue water like the sea. This country was devastated by Tinkiz, the king of the Tatars, and has not been inhabited since. We came to a mountain called Pashay, where there is a convent of the Shaykh Ata Awliya, which means "Father of the Saints." He is also called Sisad Salah, which is the Persian for "three hundred years," because they say that he is three hundred and fifty years old. They have a very high opinion of him and come to visit him from the towns and villages, and sultans and princesses visit him too. He received us with honor and made us his guests. We encamped by a river near his convent and went to see him, and when I saluted him he embraced me. His skin is fresh and smoother than any I have seen; anyone seeing him would take him to be fifty years old. He told me that he grew new hair and teeth every hundred years. I had some doubts about him, however, and God knows how much truth there is in what he says. We traveled thence to Parwan, where I met the amir Buruntayh. He treated me well and wrote to his representatives at Ghazna enjoining them to show me honor. We went on to the village of Charkh [Charikar], it being now summer, and from there to the town of Ghazna. This is the town of the famous warrior-sultan Mahmud ibn Sabuktagin, one of the greatest of rulers, who made frequent raids into India and captured cities and fortresses there.

— Ibn Battuta, 1304–1369

The area was subsequently ruled by the Timurids and Mughals until Ahmad Shah Durrani made it part of the Durrani Empire in 1747. In 1840, Parwan was the site of a major battle in the First Anglo-Afghan War where the invading British were defeated. Parwan's modern history began with the construction of a new textile factory in the town of Jabal Saraj in 1937. Parwan was involved in the Soviet–Afghan War as some of the fiercest fightings took place in the area. In the 1990s it was the site of heavy resistance against the Taliban.

=== Recent history ===
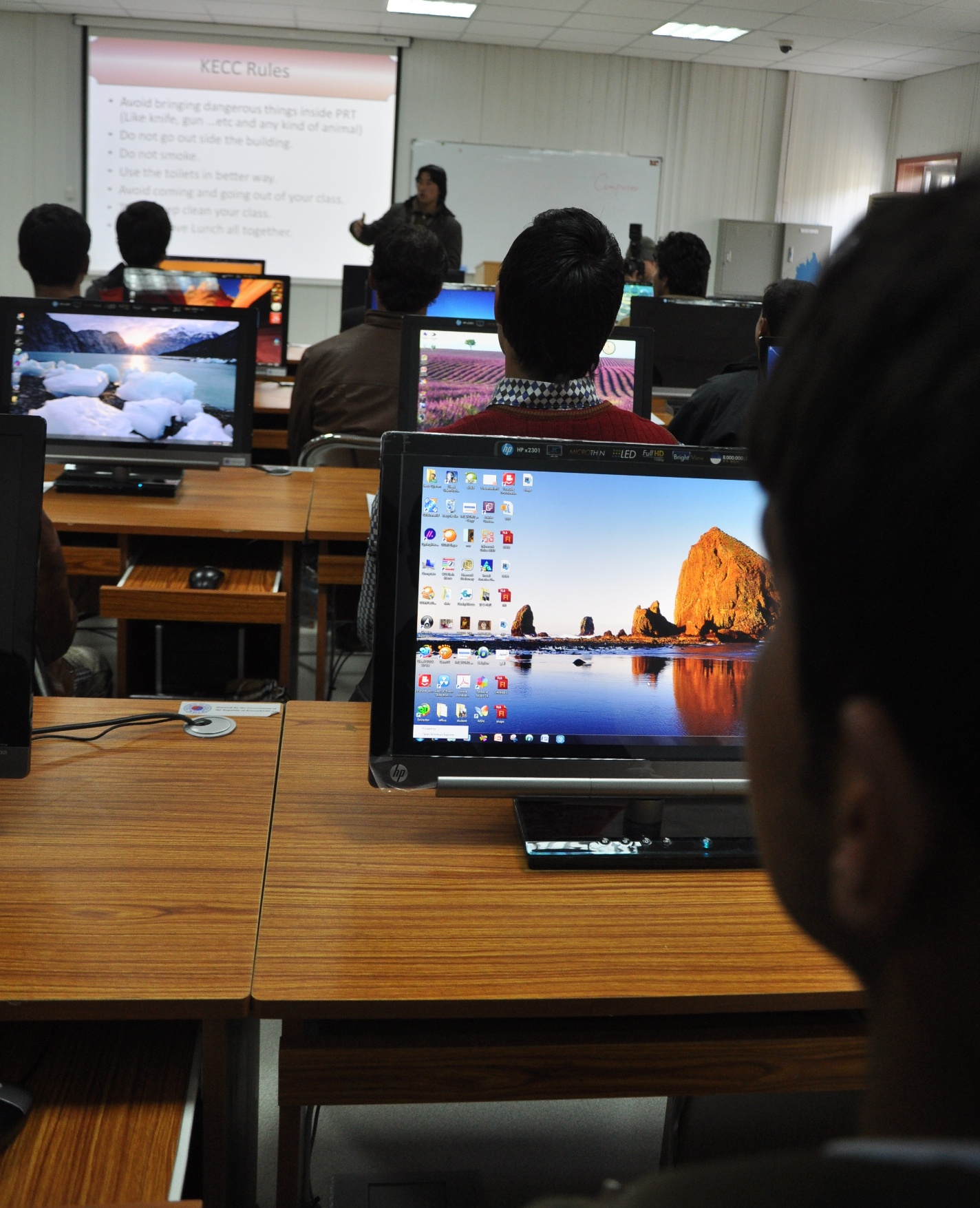
Computer class at the Korean Education and Cultural Center in Parwan.

Following the removal of the Taliban in late 2001, the United States Armed Forces took control of Bagram Air Base and began using it as one of their main bases in Afghanistan. A Provincial Reconstruction Team (PRT) led by South Korea helped the locals with development activities in the province until 2014. In mid-February 2011, five rocket-propelled grenades hit the newly built South Korean military base housing the provincial reconstruction team and civilian aid workers. No one was injured in the attack, but it came hours after a visit by South Korean Defense Minister Kim Kwan-jin, raising suspicions of Taliban involvement. The opening ceremony of the base was postponed indefinitely.

A plan to build a power plant in the province is under consideration. A large portion of Parwan's economy relies on remittances from the Afghan diaspora living abroad.

In July 2012, the Taliban publicly executed a married woman in front of a large crowd after she was found guilty of adultery. It was reported that the woman had a secret affair with a married military commander of the Afghan National Army. In August 2021, Parwan was captured by the Taliban during their offensive.

== Administrative divisions ==
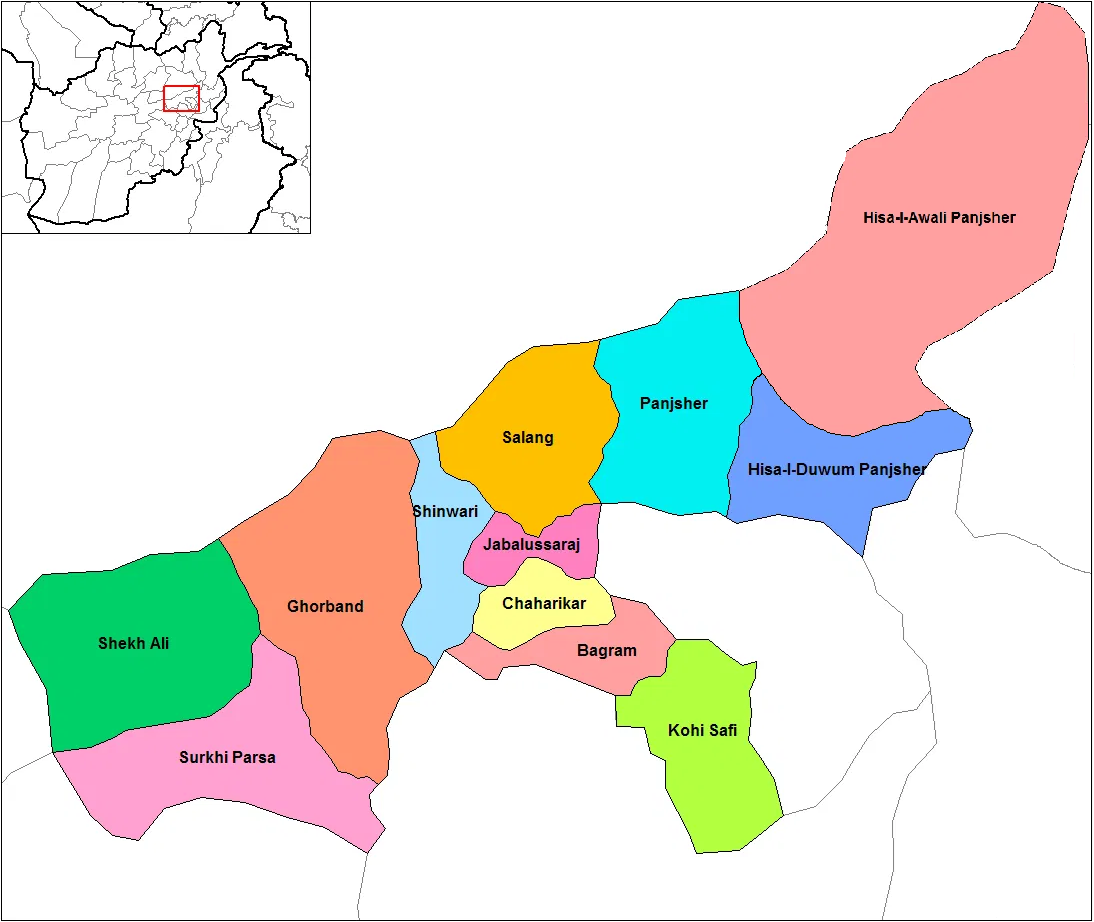
Map of the districts of Parwan as of January 2004, prior to the redrawing of provincial and district boundaries later that year, with Hisa-I-Awali Panjsher at that time still being part of Parwan

As per the figures below based on the ethnographics of each district as well as the density and therefore the inhabitability of each district, the province has a population of approximately 878,192.

Districts of Parwan Province
District	Capital	Population (2022)	Area	Pop. density	Ethnicity
Bagram		117,181	381	308	60% Tajiks, 35% Pashtuns, 5% Hazara.
Charikar (capital)		202,210	258	783	Mixed Tajiks and Pashtuns.
Ghorband		109,342	908	120	Mixed Pashtuns, Tajiks and Hazaras.
Jabal Saraj		72,345	99	730	Tajiks.
Kohi Safi		35,075	569	62	Predominantly Pashtuns.
Salang		29,362	547	54	Predominantly Tajiks, few Pashtuns.
Sayed Khel		51,549	31	1,639	Mix Tajiks and Pashtuns. Used to be part of Jabal Saraj District.
Sheikh Ali		27,901	913	31	Predominantly Hazaras.
Shinwari		46,501	722	64	Predominantly Pashtuns.
Surkhi Parsa		46,234	1,152	40	Predominantly Hazaras.
Parwan		737,700	5,715	129	Majority Tajik, notable minorities include Hazaras and Pashtuns.

== Demographics ==
=== Population ===
As of 2020, the total population of the province is about 751,000, which is multi-ethnic and mostly a rural society. 8 percent of the population lived below the national poverty line, the second lowest figure in Afghanistan behind only Logar Province.

=== Ethnicity, languages and religion ===
According to the Naval Postgraduate School, the ethnic groups of the province are as follows: Tajiks, Hazaras, Uzbeks, Pashtuns, Kuchis and other minority groups. According to Afghanistan's Ministry of Rural Rehabilitation and Development:

Around three quarters (73%) of the population of Parwan lives in rural districts, while one quarter (27%) lives in urban areas, Around 50% of the population is male and 50% is female. Persian (Dari dialect) and Pashto are the main languages spoken in the province; however Persian speakers outnumber Pashto speakers by a ratio of 5 to 2. Parwan province also has a population of Kuchis or nomads whose numbers vary in different seasons. In winter 30,290 Kuchi live in Parwan province, of which 66% are short-range migratory and the remaining 34% are long-range migratory. During the summer, Kuchi migrate to Parwan province from Laghman, Kapisa, Baghlan and to a lesser extent from Kabul, Nangarhar and Kunar. The Kuchi population in the summer is 121,517 individuals.

Estimated ethnolinguistic and -religious composition
Ethnicity	Persian-speaking people			Pashtun	Turkmen	Others	Sources
Period	Tajik/ Farsiwan	Hazara	Qizilbash	Pashtun	Turkmen	Others	Sources

2004–2021 (Islamic Republic)	71 – 81%			18 – 29%	0 – 1%	∅
2020 EU	1st	3rd	–	2nd	–	–
2018 UN	70%	11%	–	18% (Note: excl. Kuchi.)	1%	–
2015 CP	major	∅	∅	major (Note: incl. Kuchi.)	–	∅ (Note: incl. Uzbek.)
2015 NPS	∅	∅	∅	∅ (Note: incl. Wardak, Safi and Kuchi.)	–	∅
2011 PRT	71%			29%	–	–
2011 USA	71%		–	29%	–	–
2009 ISW	major	∅	∅	major	–	–

Legend:
- ∅: Ethnicity mentioned in source but not quantified
- –: Ethnicity not mentioned specifically
- Source abbreviations: Empirical sources: –, Government sources: EU – European Union Agency for Asylum, CP – Colombo Plan, PRT – Provincial Reconstruction Team of the United States government, UN – United Nations Assistance Mission in Afghanistan, Editorial sources: ISW – Institute for the Study of War, NPS – Naval Postgraduate School, USA – United States Army

=== Education ===
The overall literacy rate (6+ years of age) fell from 37% in 2005 to 28% in 2011. The overall net enrolment rate (6–13 years of age) increased from 42% in 2005 to 54% in 2011.

=== Health ===
The percentage of households with clean drinking water fell from 32% in 2005 to 11% in 2011. The percentage of births attended to by a skilled birth attendant increased from 4% in 2005 to 7% in 2011.

== Gallery ==
Images of Parwan Province

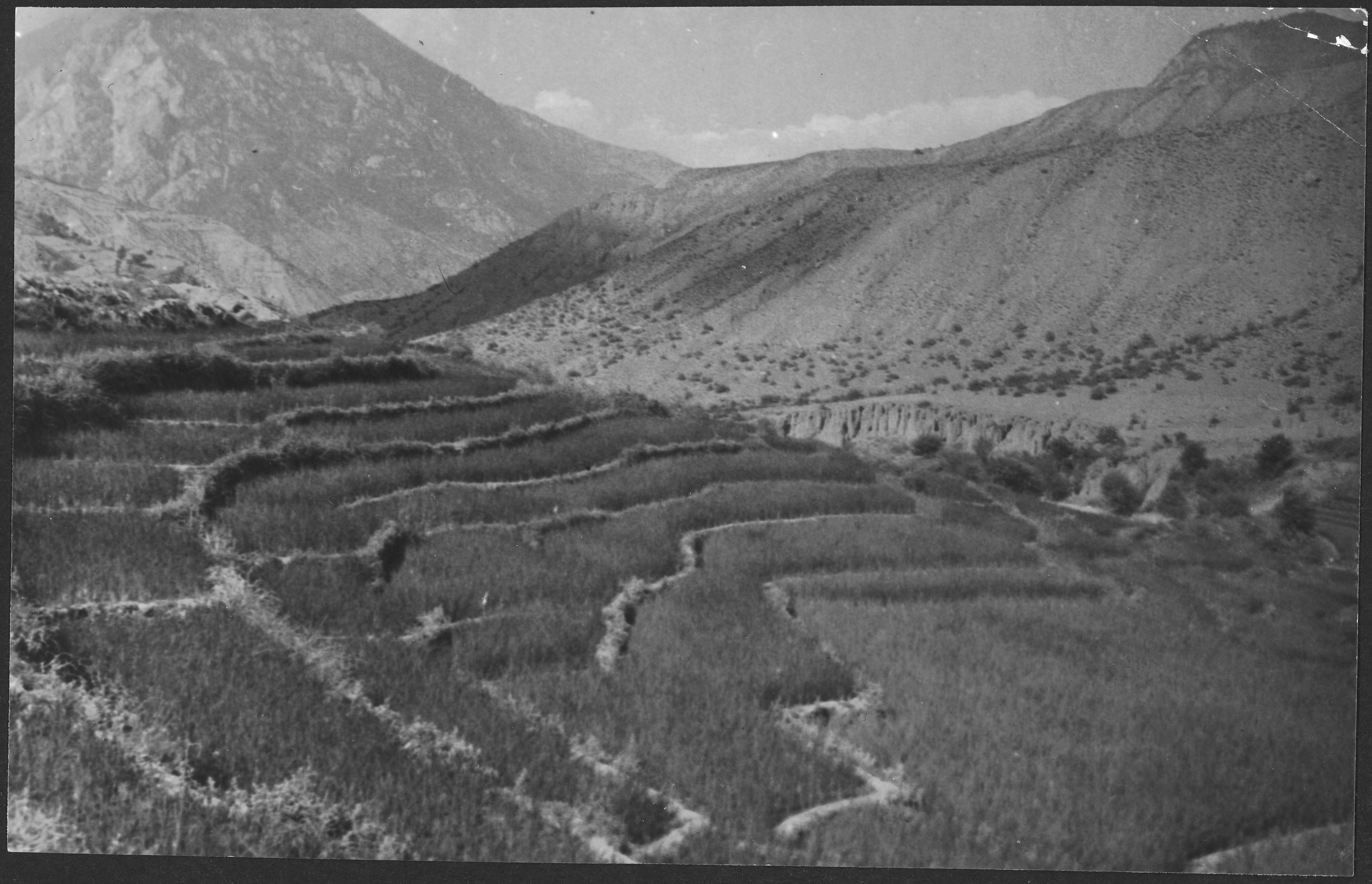
Near the Shibar Pass that connects Parwan to Bamyan.

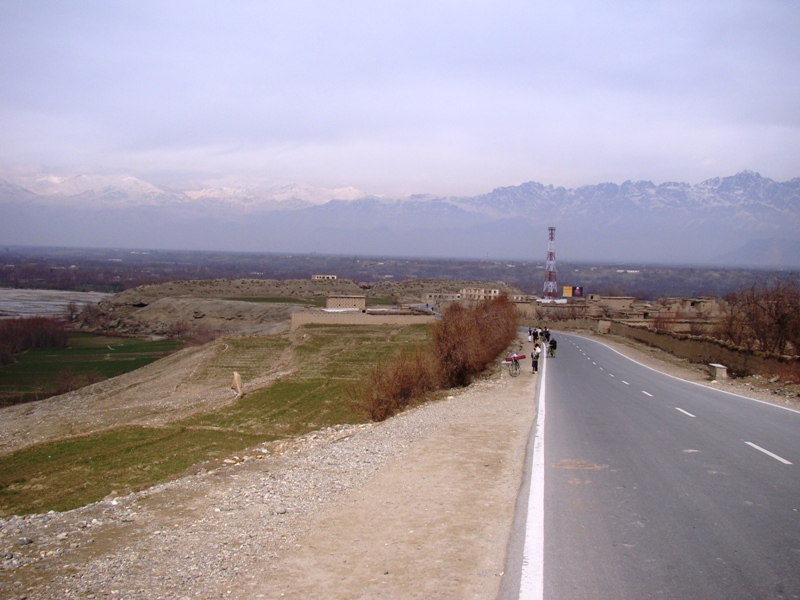
A road in the Parwan Province, near the Sayed Bridge which is located short distance north from Bagram Air Base.

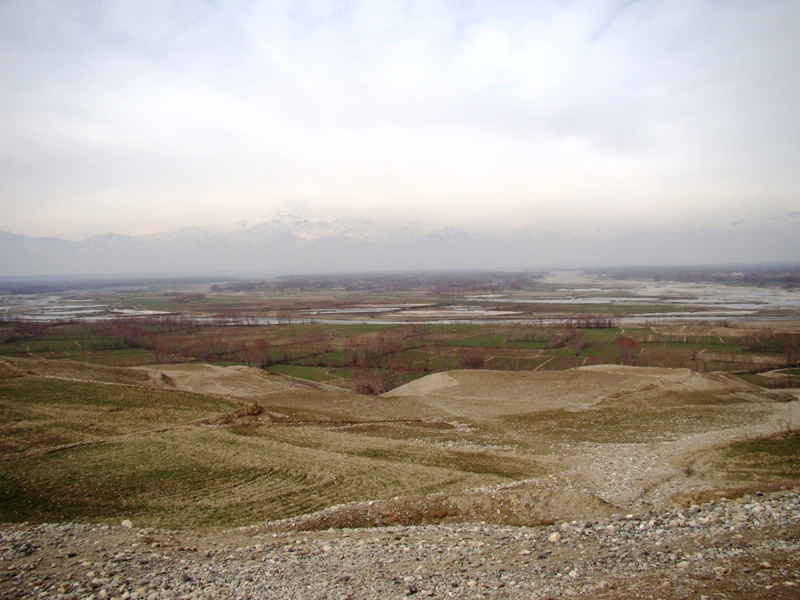
Fields near the Sayed Bridge

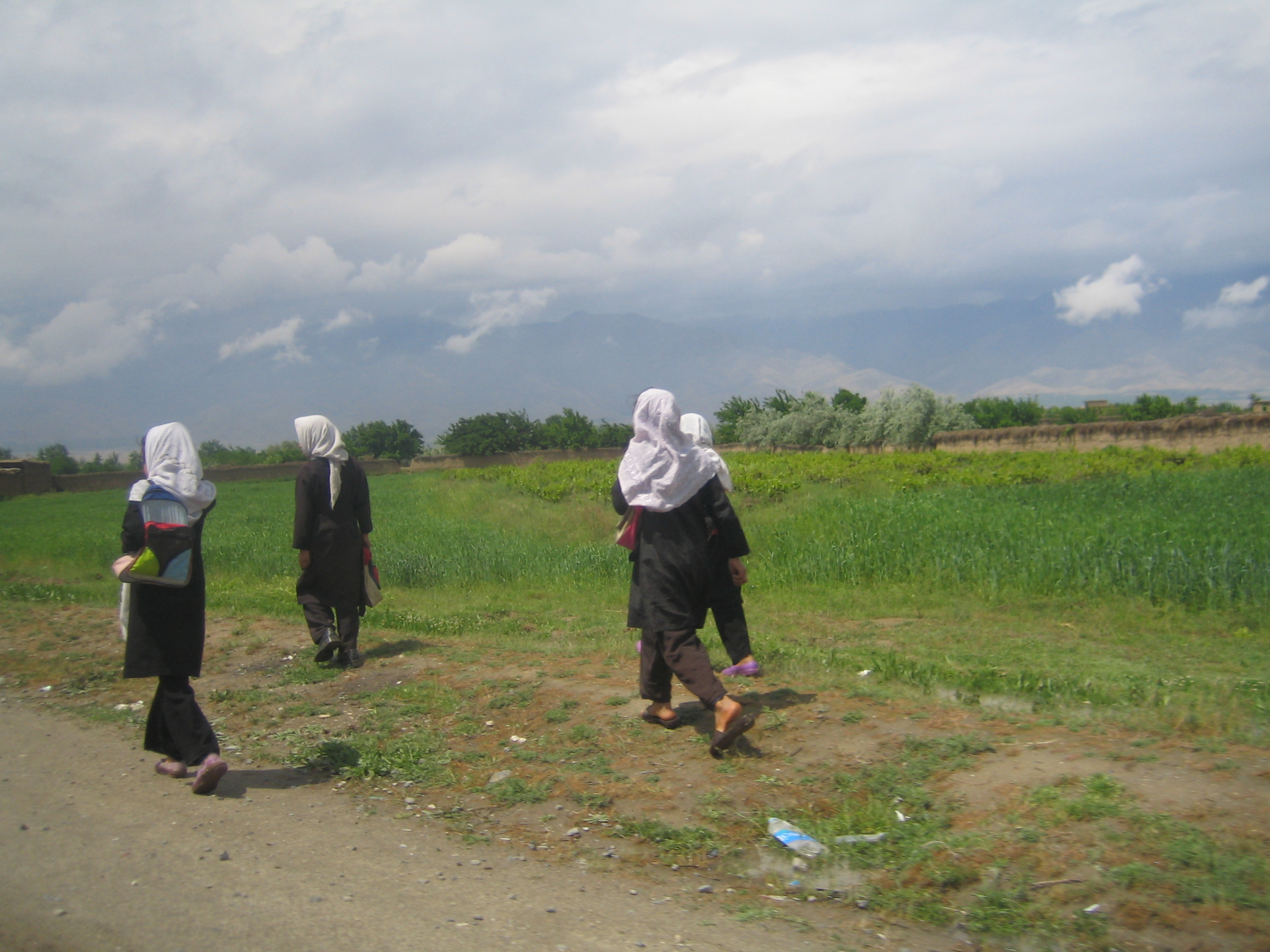
School girls in a rural area of Parwan

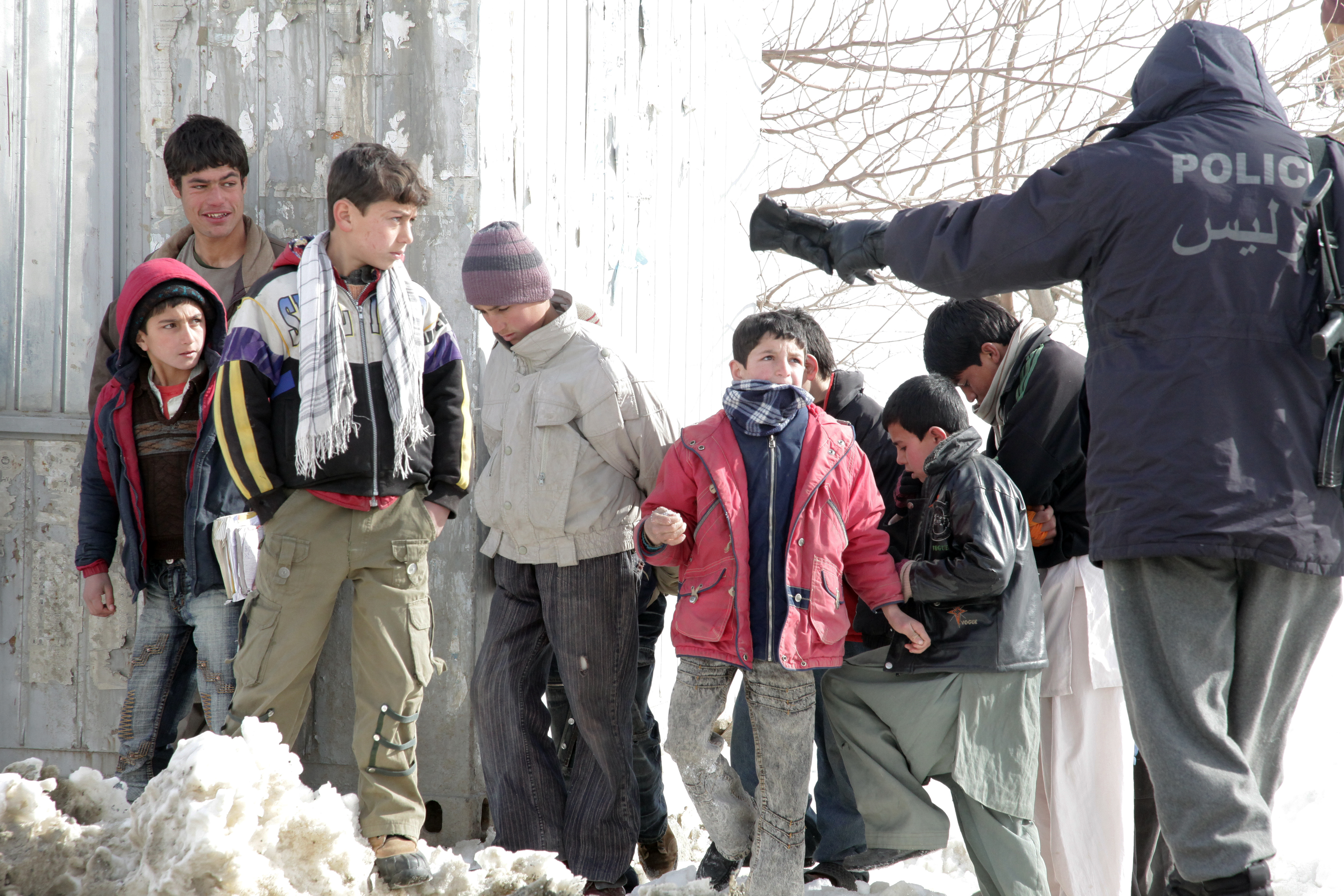
A member of the Afghan National Police trying to control local children awaiting the distribution of goods from the U.S. military for the winter months.

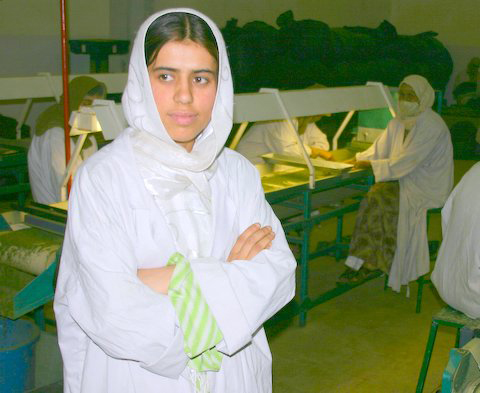
Afghan women working inside a factory in Parwan

== See also ==
- Provinces of Afghanistan
- Battle of Parwan
