= Hamidullah Amin =

Afghan politician

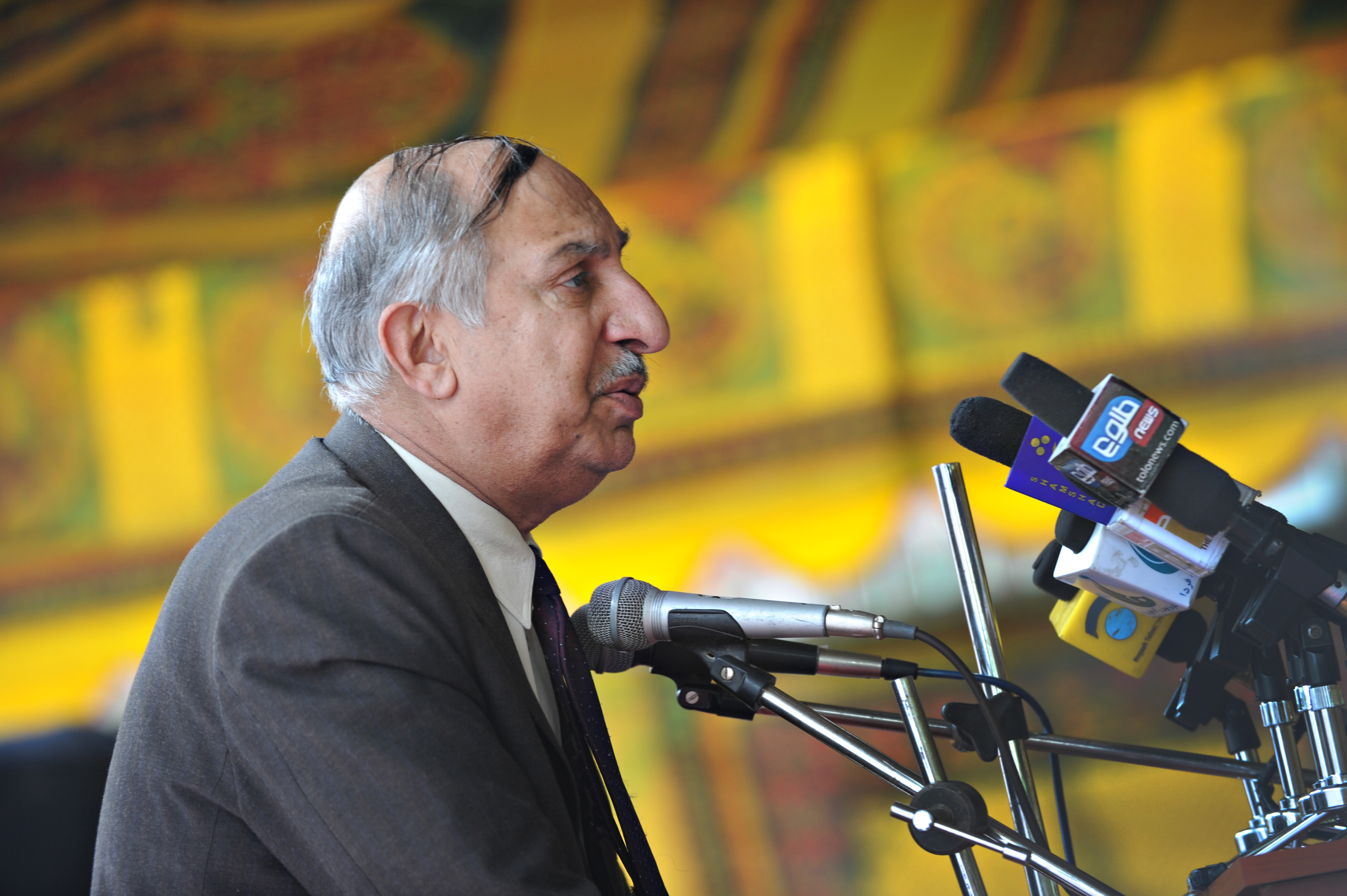
- Hamidullah Amin speaking in 2011
- Born: 1941 (age 84–85); Bagrami District, Kabul Province, Afghanistan
- Education: Durham University
- Occupations: Politician, academic administrator
- Title: Chancellor of Kabul University
- Term: 2008-2016
- Predecessor: Ashraf Ghani
- Successor: Hamidullah Farooqi
- Political party: Independent

Hamidullah Amin (born 1941) is an Afghan politician from Bagrami District, Kabul Province, was serving as the chancellor of Kabul University from 2008 to 2016. He also worked at the university prior to fleeing Afghanistan in 1988.

Amin completed his M.A. in geography at Durham University in 1968, entitled The role of communication in the development of Afghanistan. He returned to Afghanistan to work for Kabul University, as well as serving as a visiting lecturer at the University of Nebraska at Omaha. During this time he published his most influential English language work, A Geography of Afghanistan. and remained after the Soviet invasion. He eventually fled in 1988, and worked for 14 years at Macquarie University in Australia, before returning to Kabul to become Chancellor. During his time, Amin has worked to increase the number of female students at the university, and in higher education in Afghanistan in general.

He is fluent in Pashto, Dari, English and Urdu.
