= Ashraf Ghani =

President of Afghanistan from 2014 to 2021

- اشرف غني
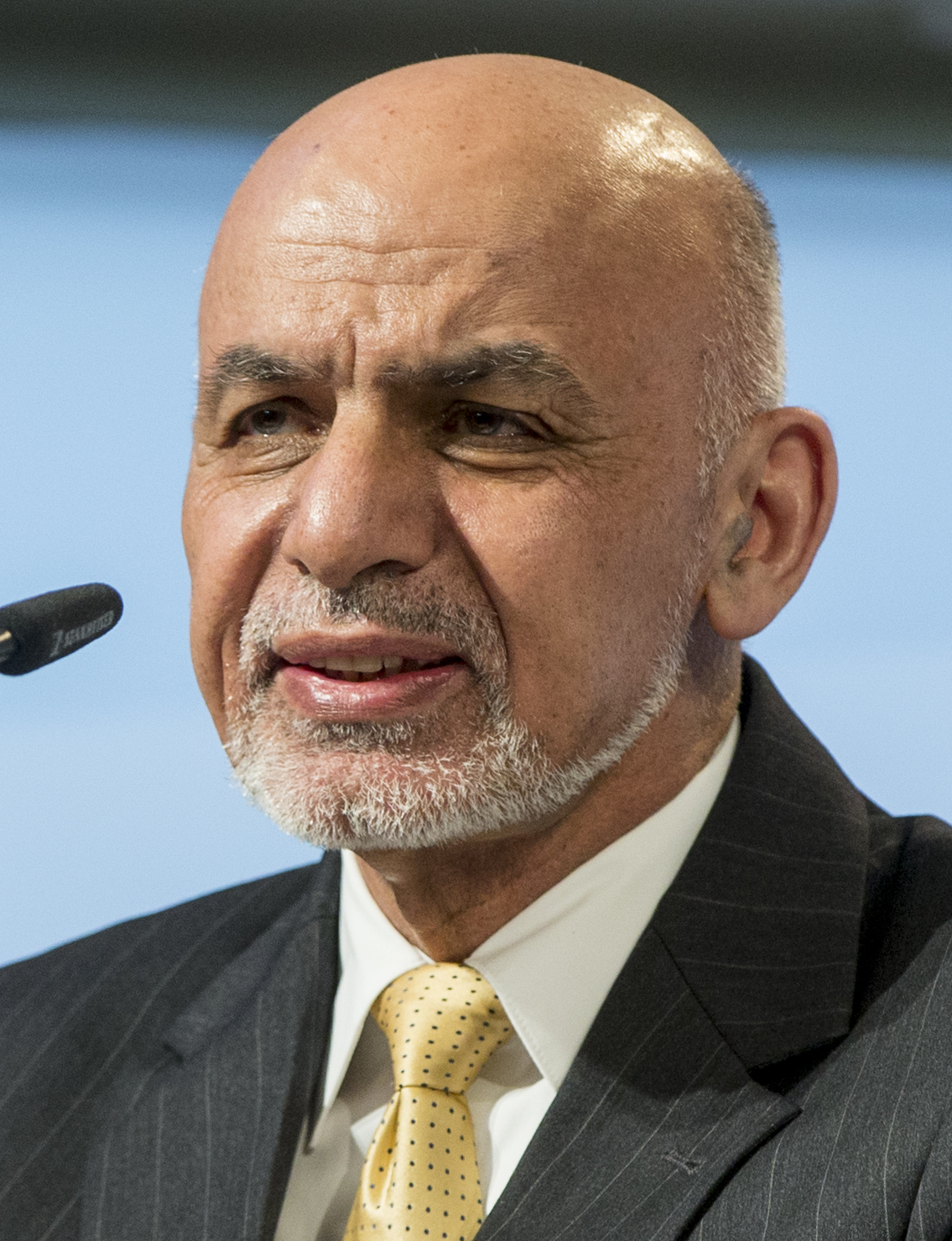
- Ghani in 2017

8th President of Afghanistan
- In office 29 September 2014 – 15 August 2021
- Vice President: First VP: Abdul Rashid Dostum; Amrullah Saleh; Second VP: Sarwar Danish
- Chief Executive: Abdullah Abdullah (2014–2020)
- Preceded by: Hamid Karzai
- Succeeded by: Hibatullah Akhundzada (as Supreme Leader)

Chancellor of Kabul University
- In office 22 December 2004 – 21 December 2008
- Preceded by: Habibullah Habib
- Succeeded by: Hamidullah Amin

Minister of Finance
- In office 2 June 2002 – 14 December 2004
- President: Hamid Karzai
- Preceded by: Hedayat Amin Arsala
- Succeeded by: Anwar ul-Haq Ahady

Personal details
- Born: 19 May 1949 (age 77) Logar, Afghanistan
- Citizenship: Afghanistan; United States (until 2009)
- Party: Independent
- Spouse: Rula Saade (m. 1975)
- Children: 2, including Mariam Ghani
- Relatives: Hashmat Ghani Ahmadzai (brother)
- Education: American University of Beirut (BA); Columbia University (MA, PhD)
- Ashraf Ghani's voice Ghani discussing security assistance from the United States; Recorded 24 March 2015

Mohammad Ashraf Ghani Ahmadzai (Note: Pashto: محمد اشرف غنی احمدزی [mʊˈhamad aʃˈraf ɣaˈni ahmadˈzai]) (born 19 May 1949) is an Afghan former politician and economist who served as the 8th and last president of Afghanistan from 2014 until his government was overthrown by the Taliban in 2021.

Ghani was born in Logar, then part of the Kingdom of Afghanistan. After his grade-school education in Afghanistan, he spent much of his time abroad, studying in Lebanon and the United States. After receiving his PhD in cultural anthropology from Columbia University in 1983, he taught at various institutions and was an associate professor of anthropology at Johns Hopkins University. For much of the 1990s, he worked at the World Bank. In December 2001, he returned to Afghanistan after the collapse of the Taliban government. He then served as finance minister in Hamid Karzai's cabinet. He resigned in December 2004 to become the dean of Kabul University. In 2009, Ghani ran in the 2009 Afghan presidential election but came in fourth.

Ghani became president after winning the controversial 2014 Afghan presidential election: The election was so disputed that negotiations between Ghani and rival Abdullah Abdullah were mediated by the United States. Ghani became president and Abdullah chief executive, with power split 50-50. In 2020, Ghani was re-elected after a delayed result from the 2019 presidential elections. As president, Ghani was known for his intensity and energetic speeches. He aimed to transform Afghanistan into a technocratic state, winning him support from youth and urban demographics. His cabinets were relatively young and well-educated. Ghani made efforts to make peace with Taliban insurgents and improving relations with Pakistan. However many of his promises, such as fighting corruption and turning the country into a trade hub between Central and South Asia, were left unfulfilled. His position was also weakened by political rivalries, his attempt to lessen the power of ex-warlords, and an uneasy relationship with the United States regarding the war. He was also criticized for being aloof and short-tempered, including being in denial during the Taliban's offensive in 2021.

On 15 August 2021, his term ended abruptly, as the Taliban took over Kabul. Ghani and staff fled Afghanistan and took refuge in the United Arab Emirates. He later stated he left in order to avoid further violence, and that staying and dying would have accomplished nothing but adding another tragedy to Afghanistan's history. However, he was also condemned across various spectrums for abandoning Afghanistan to the Taliban and has been accused of corruption during his administration. In particular, Ghani's softness on the Taliban was criticized by many.

== Early life (1949–1983) ==
Ghani was born on 19 May 1949 in the Logar Province in the Kingdom of Afghanistan to Shah Pesand, a clerk worker, and Kawbaba Lodin, who hailed from Kandahar. He belongs to the Ahmadzai Pashtun tribe.

=== Education ===
Ghani's grade-school education was mostly done in Afghanistan. He attended secondary-level schooling in Kabul. But for the 1966–1967 school year, Ghani studied as a foreign exchange student at Lake Oswego High School (LOHS) in Lake Oswego, Oregon under the name Ashraf Ahmad. The American Field Service sponsored his foreign exchange stay. He served on the student council.

In 1973, he received a Bachelor of Arts in political studies from the American University of Beirut in Lebanon. There, he met his future wife, Rula. From 1973 to 1977, Ghani served on the faculty of Kabul University and Aarhus University in Denmark in 1977.

In 1977, he received a Master's in cultural anthropology from Columbia University on a government scholarship.

While Ghani originally intended to stay for two years, the outbreak of the 1978 Saur Revolution led to much of his male family being imprisoned. He stayed at Columbia and received a PhD in cultural anthropology in 1983. His doctoral thesis was titled 'Production and domination: Afghanistan, 1747–1901'. His thesis advisors included Conrad M. Arensberg, Richard Bulliet, Morton Fried, and Robert F. Murphy.

== Career before returning to Afghanistan (1983–2001) ==
=== Academic career (1983–1991) ===
In 1983, after receiving his PhD, he taught briefly at the University of California, Berkeley, and then at Johns Hopkins University as an associate professor from 1983 to 1991. His academic research was on state-building and social transformation. In 1985, he completed a year of fieldwork researching Pakistani madrassas as a Fulbright Scholar.

=== World Bank (1991–2001) ===
In 1991, Ghani became the Lead Anthropologist at the World Bank. During this time, he spent five years working in China, India, and Russia working on various projects. After the mid-nineties, he switched to working on the Bank's social policy, reviewing country strategies, and designing reform programs. While working for the Bank, he attended the leadership training programs of Harvard-INSEAD and World Bank-Stanford Graduate School of Business.

== Return to Afghanistan (2001–2013) ==
In December 2001, he finally returned to Afghanistan after 24 years of absence. After the ousting of the Taliban that year, Ghani became a key figure in the Afghan Interim Administration, which lasted from December 2001 until July 2002.

He left his job at the World Bank and joined the United Nations as Special Adviser to Ambassador Lakhdar Brahimi, the United Nations Secretary-General's special envoy to Afghanistan. In this role, he worked on design and implementation of the Bonn Agreement, which outlined the post-Taliban government of Afghanistan. During this time, he also worked pro bono as Chief Adviser to then-interim president Hamid Karzai. He approved the constitution and worked on preparing the Loya Jirgas that eventually elected Karzai.

=== Minister of Finance (2002–2004) ===
On 2 June 2002, Ghani became finance minister of the new Transitional Afghan government under President Karzai. This government would last until 2004, when it was to be replaced by a "fully representative government".

He carried out extensive reforms, including issuing a new currency, computerizing treasury operations, instituting a single treasury account, adopting a policy of balanced budgets and using budgets as the central policy instrument, centralizing revenue collection, tariff reform and overhauling customs. He instituted regular reporting to the cabinet, the public and international stakeholders as a tool of transparency and accountability, and required donors to focus their interventions on three sectors, improving accountability with government counterparts and preparing a development strategy that held Afghans more accountable for their own future development. He assisted with the National Solidarity Program, which covered 13,000 of the country's estimated 20,000 villages.

=== Chancellor of Kabul University (2004–2008) ===
After Karzai was elected in October 2004, Ghani had declined to join his cabinet and instead asked to be appointed to the chancellorship at Kabul University. From 22 December 2004 to 21 December 2008, Ghani thus served as Chancellor of Kabul University. He focused on rebuilding the university and its resources after years of conflict and neglect under the Taliban government.

In January 2005, Ghani co-founded the Institute for State Effectiveness with Clare Lockhart, of which he was chairman. The institute focused on the role of the state and transparency in governance. The organization's work was discussed at the UN and World Bank in September 2005. With Lockhart, he later published the book Fixing Failed States: A Framework for Rebuilding a Fractured World in 2008.

In 2005, he became a member of the Commission on Legal Empowerment of the Poor, an independent initiative hosted by the United Nations Development Programme.

Throughout 2005, Ghani gave many keynote speeches across the world, including the American Bar Association's International Rule of Law Symposium, the Trans-Atlantic Policy Network, the annual meeting of the Norwegian Government's development staff, CSIS's meeting on UN reform, the UN–OECD–World Bank's meeting on Fragile States and TED Global.

He also regularly gave interviews and contributed to the Financial Times, International Herald Tribune, Los Angeles Times, The New York Times, The Wall Street Journal, and The Washington Post.

At the end of 2006, the Financial Times ran a front-page report speculating that Ghani was a top candidate to succeed Kofi Annan as secretary-general of the United Nations. He was quoted as saying, "I hope to win, through ideas."

=== 2009 presidential election ===
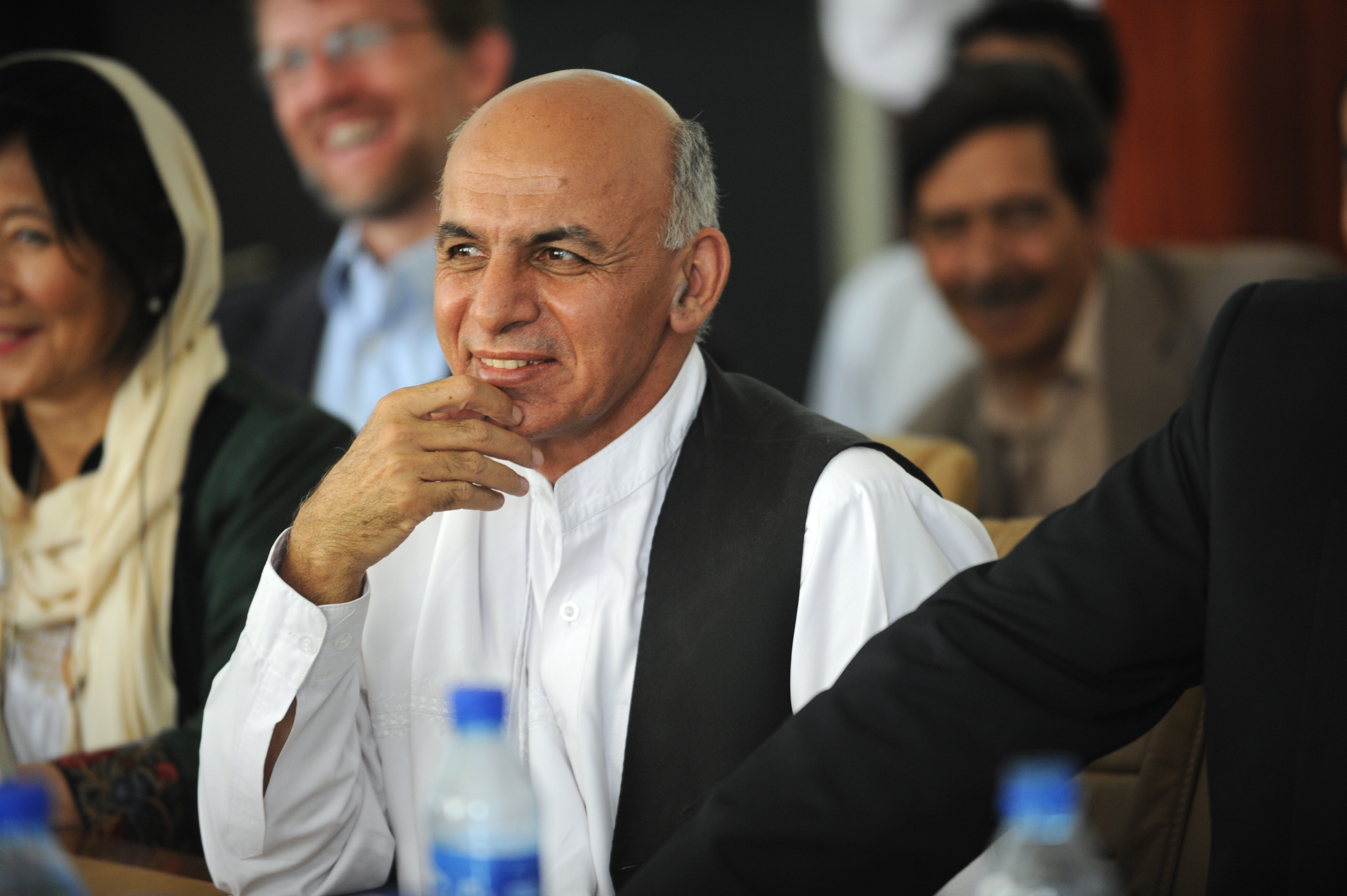
Ghani at a meeting in Panjshir Province in 2011

In January 2009, an article by Ahmad Majidyar of the American Enterprise Institute included Ghani on a list of fifteen possible candidates in the 2009 Afghan presidential election.

On 7 May 2009, Ashraf Ghani registered as a candidate in the 2009 Afghan presidential election. Ghani's campaign emphasized the importance of a representative administration, good governance, a dynamic economy and employment opportunities for the Afghan people. Unlike other major candidates, Ghani asked the Afghan diaspora to support his campaign and provide financial support. He appointed Mohammed Ayub Rafiqi as one of his vice-president candidate deputies, and hired Clinton campaign chief strategist James Carville as a campaign advisor.

Preliminary results placed Ghani fourth in a field of 38, securing roughly 3% of the votes.

=== Chairman of the Transition Coordination Commission (2010–2013) ===
From 2010 to 1 October 2013, he served as chairman of the Afghan Transition Coordination Commission (TCC), which was responsible for transferring power from ISAF/NATO troops to Afghan Security Forces. He travelled across Afghanistan extensively during this time.

On 28 January 2010, Ghani attended the International Conference on Afghanistan in London, pledging his support to help rebuild their country. Ghani presented his ideas to Karzai as an example of the importance of cooperation among Afghans and with the international community, supporting Karzai's reconciliation strategy. Ghani said hearing Karzai's second inaugural address in November 2009 and his pledges to fight corruption, promote reconciliation and replace international security forces persuaded him to help.

Ghani resigned his post on 1 October 2013 in order to run for president in 2014.

== Presidency (2014–2021) ==
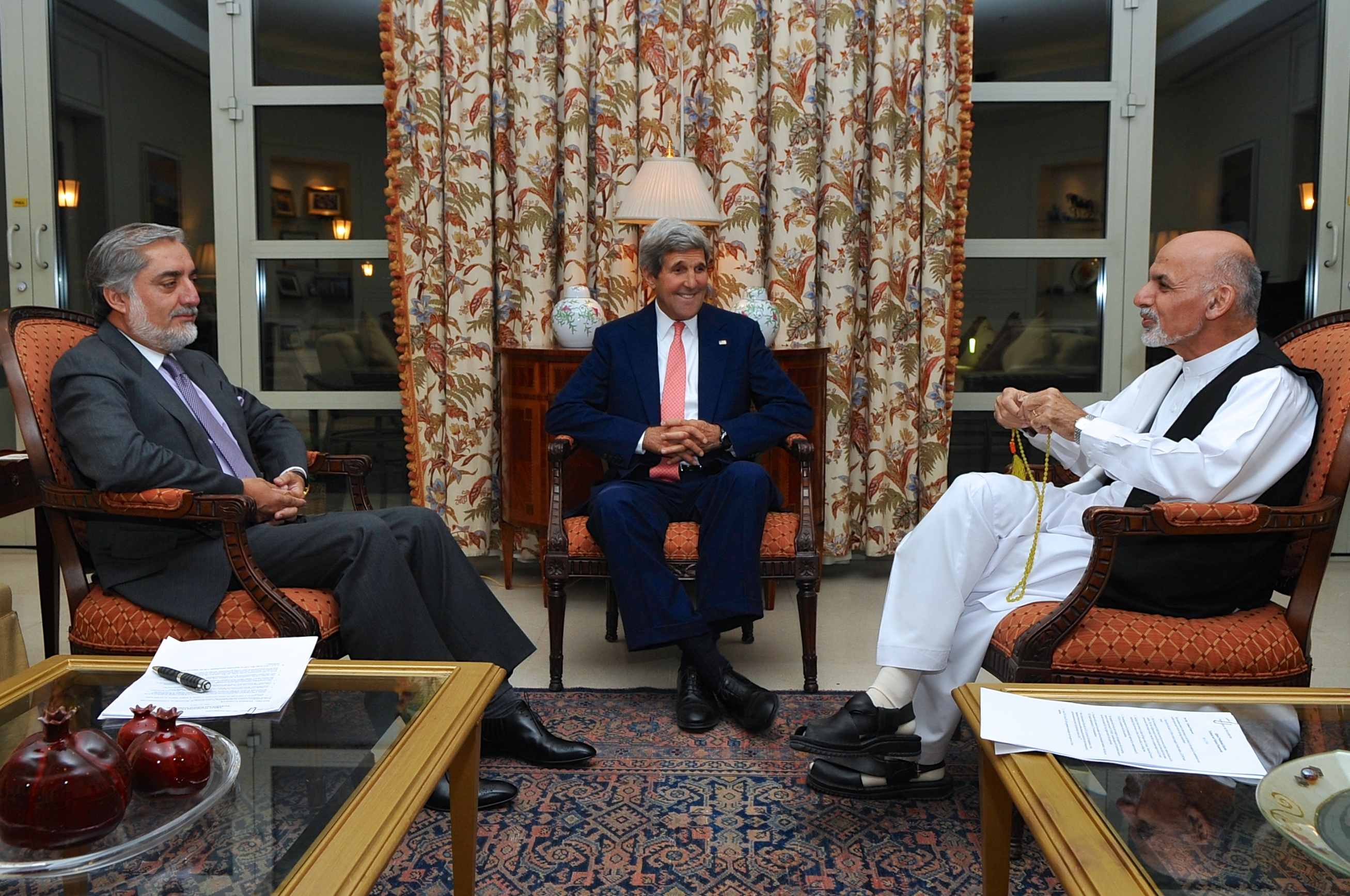
President Ghani sitting with Abdullah Abdullah and John Kerry in July 2014

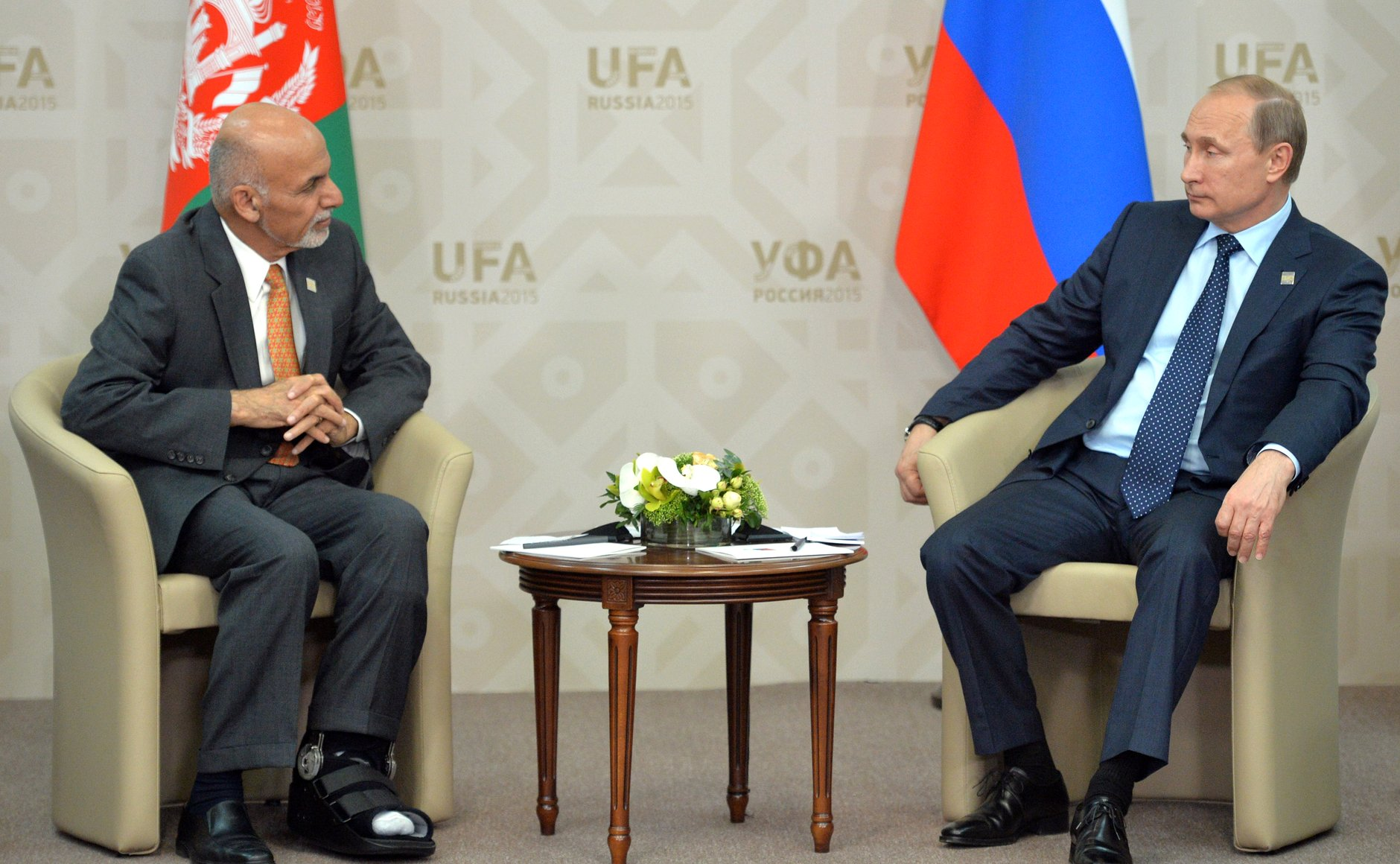
Ghani with Russian president Vladimir Putin in Ufa, Russia, 2015

After announcing his candidacy for the 2014 elections, Ghani tapped General Abdul Rashid Dostum, a prominent Uzbek politician and former military official in Karzai's government, and Sarwar Danish, an ethnic Hazara who served as the justice minister in Karzai's cabinet, as his vice-presidential candidates.

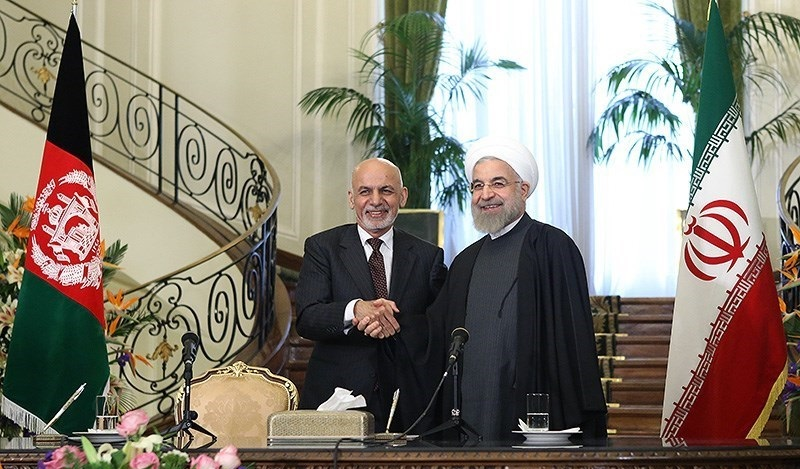
Ghani meeting with Iranian president Hassan Rouhani in Saadabad Palace

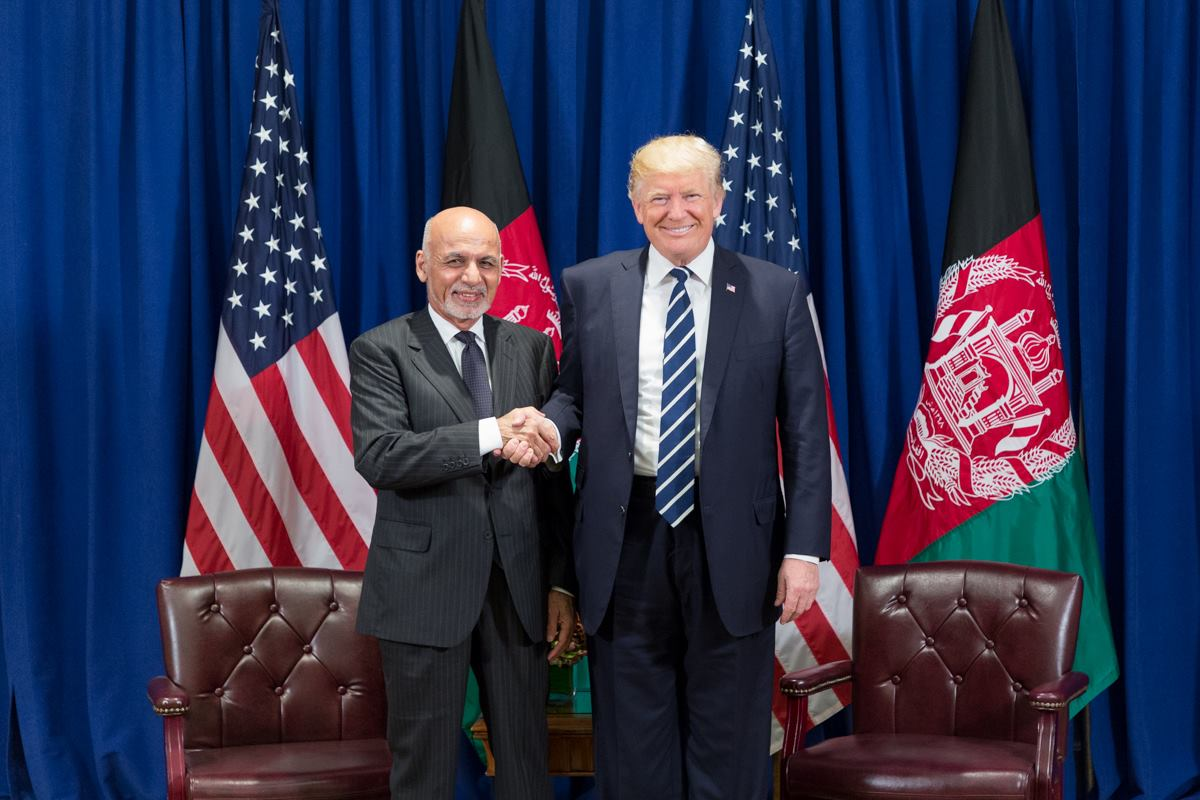
Ghani with US President Donald Trump in October 2017

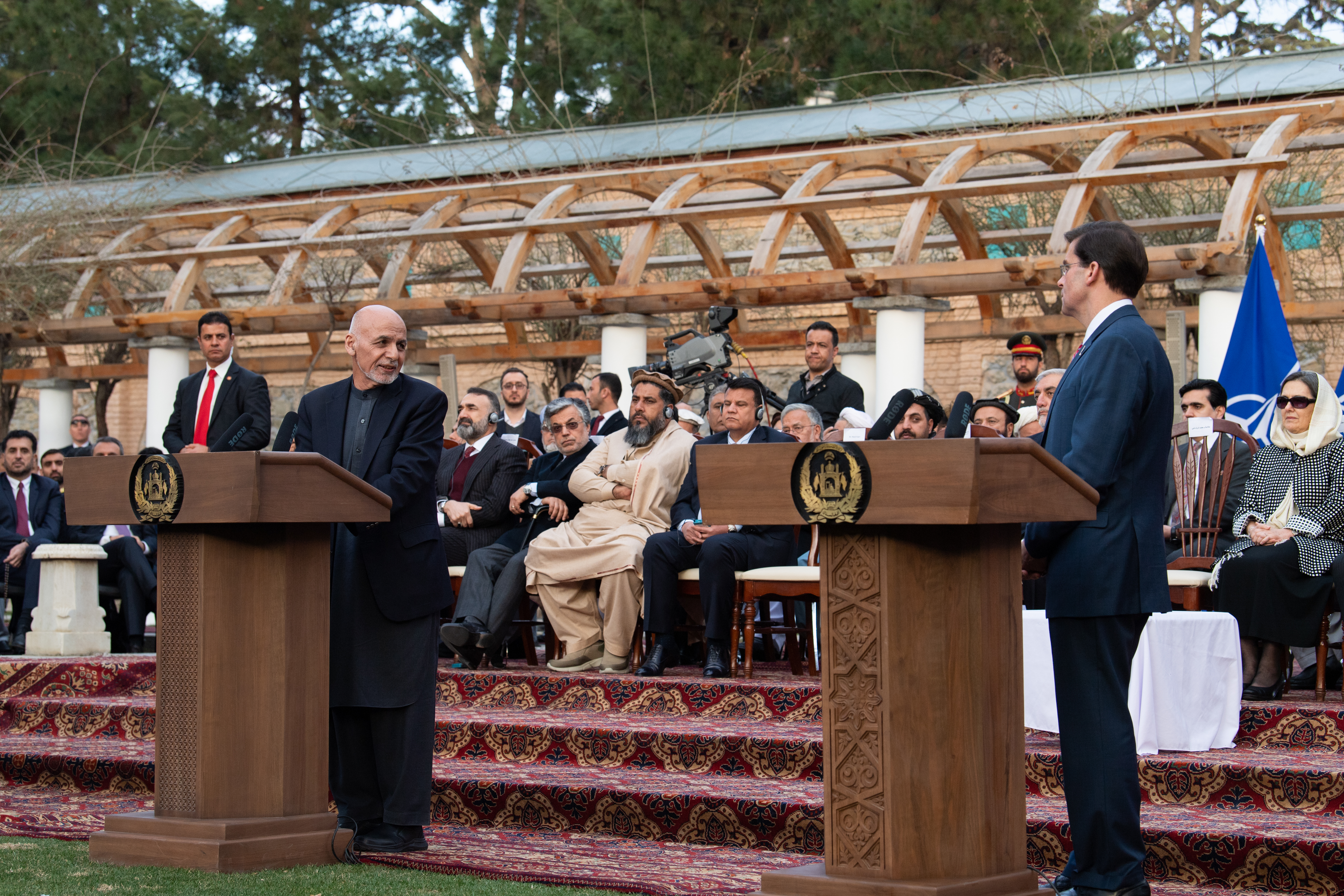
Ghani with US defence secretary Mark Esper at the Dilkusha Mansion Garden of the Arg in Kabul

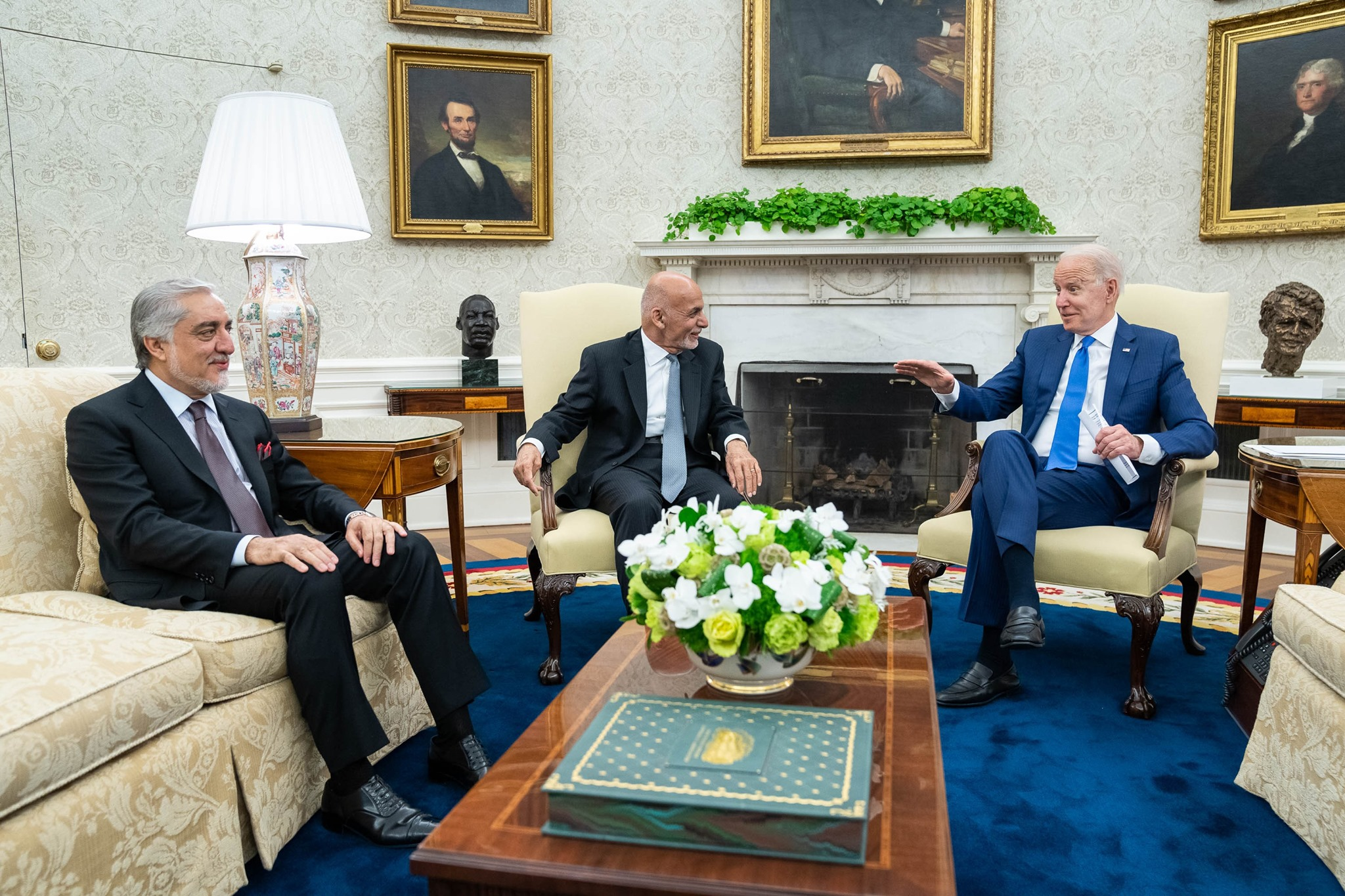
Ghani with US president Joe Biden in June 2021

After none of the candidates managed to win more than 50% of the vote in the first round of the election, Ghani and Abdullah Abdullah, the two frontrunners from the first round, contested in a runoff election, which was held on 14 June 2014.

Initial results from the run-off elections showed Ghani as the overwhelming favourite to win the elections. However, allegations of electoral fraud resulted in a stalemate, along with threats of violence and the formation of a parallel government by the camp of his opponent, Abdullah Abdullah. On 7 August 2014, US Secretary of State John Kerry flew to Kabul to broker a deal that outlined an extensive audit of nearly 8 million votes and formation of a national unity government with a new role for a chief executive officer who would carry out meaningful functions within the president's administration.

After a three-month audit process, which was supervised by the United Nations with financial support from the US government, the Independent Election Commission announced Ghani as president after Ghani agreed to a national unity deal. Initially, the election commission said it would not formally announce specific results. It later released a statement that said Ghani managed to secure 55.4% and Abdullah Abdullah secured 43.5% of the vote, although it declined to release the individual vote results. In September 2019, an explosion near an election rally attended by President Ashraf Ghani killed 24 people and injured 31 others, but Ghani was unhurt.

Ghani signed a law in September 2020 requiring mothers' names to be added to children's ID cards, in addition to fathers' names, which was seen as a win for women's rights activists in Afghanistan.

At age 65, Ghani became the oldest inaugurated Afghan ruler since the foundation of the Durrani Empire in 1747. At his 2019 re-election, at age 70, he overtook Mohammed Daoud Khan to become the oldest incumbent president.

=== Economy and trade ===
During his tenure, Ghani strengthened ties with Central Asian countries such as Uzbekistan, with which it has made deals to increase mutual trading. New trade routes have also been launched within the wider region. The Chabahar Port in Iran allows increased trading with India whilst avoiding Pakistani territory. Plans for a railway line from Khaf, Iran to Herat, Afghanistan were set in motion in 2018, with the railway being completed in 2020. In 2017, a railway line from Turkmenistan was extended to Aqina in Afghanistan, the precursor of the "Lapis Lazuli" transport corridor that was signed by Ghani that same year and would link Afghanistan to the Caucasus and the Black Sea. Other regional projects include the CASA-1000 hydroelectricity transmission from Central Asia, and the TAPI gas pipeline, expected to be completed by 2018 and 2019 respectively. In January 2018, at the inauguration of the Khan Steel iron smelting plant in Kabul, Ghani said that he is aiming for Afghanistan to become a steel exporter.

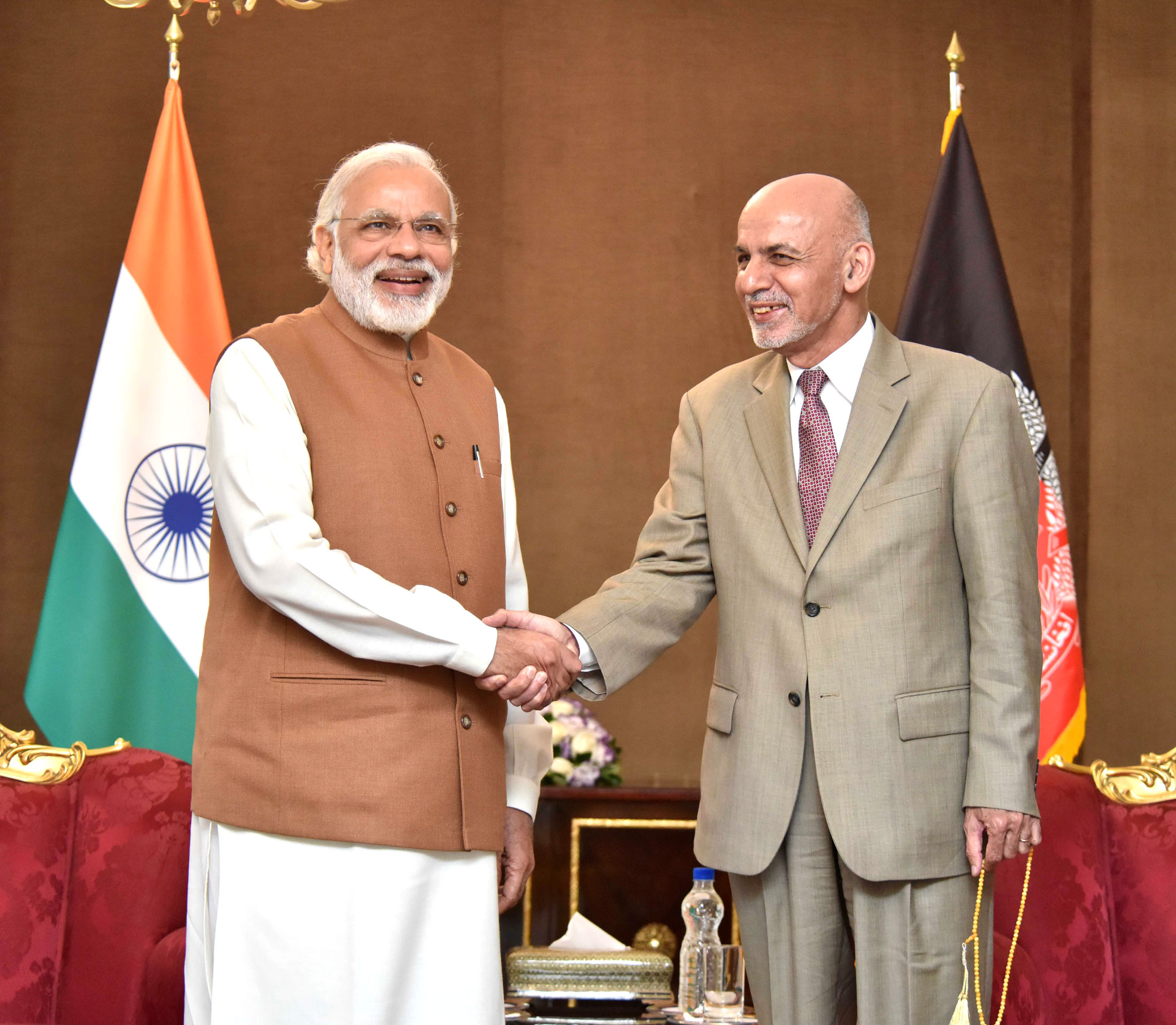
Ghani with Indian prime minister Narendra Modi

In 2015, a survey conducted by the Afghan news channel TOLO News showed that the popularity of Ashraf Ghani in Afghanistan had fallen dramatically, with only 27.5% of respondents claiming that they were satisfied with his leadership.

=== Relations with Pakistan and India ===
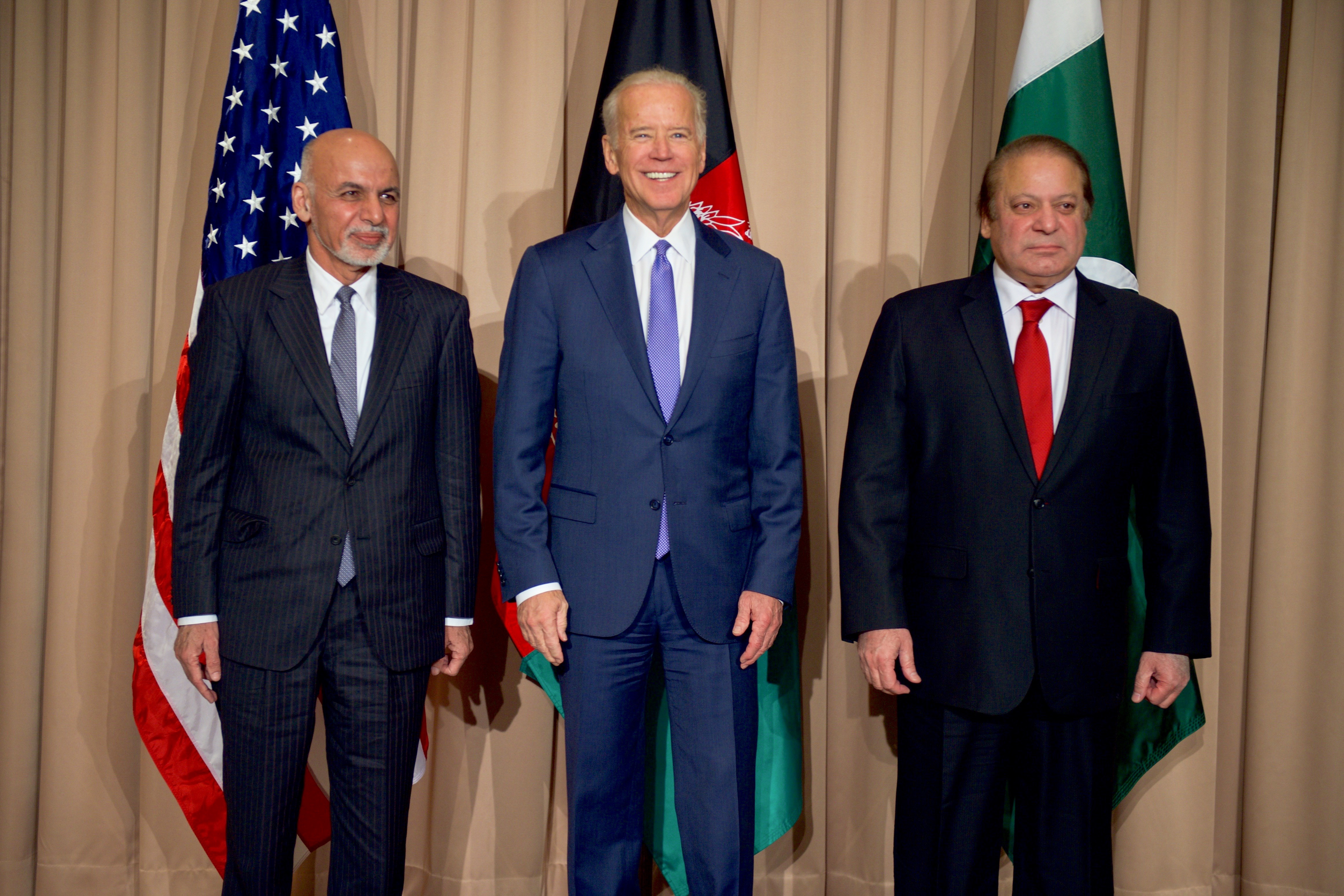
Ghani with US Vice-President Joe Biden and Pakistani Prime Minister Nawaz Sharif at the 2016 World Economic Forum in Switzerland

Since his election, Ghani wanted to improve relations with Pakistan, which in turn could pave the way for peace talks with the Taliban. He refused to recognize the border with Pakistan, known as the Durand Line, which Pakistan views as an existential issue. He made his first visit to Pakistan on 14 November 2014, meeting Prime Minister Nawaz Sharif. However, after many terror attacks in Afghanistan which were largely blamed on Pakistan, and failed Taliban peace talks, Ghani grew increasingly cold to Pakistan. Ghani claimed that Pakistan had hit an "undeclared war of aggression" against Afghanistan. Following two deadly Taliban/Haqqani attacks in Kabul in January 2018, Ghani called Pakistan the "center of the Taliban". Tolo News while quoting an unnamed source alleged that Ashraf Ghani had refused to take a call from the Pakistani prime minister, instead he sent a NDS delegation to hand over evidence that the terrorists were supported by Pakistan. However, Afghan envoy Omar Zakhilwal rejected such reports regarding Ghani's phone call rejection with Pakistan prime minister. He stated that no phone call took place between the two leaders and that such reports are baseless. At a July 2021 conference in Tashkent, Ghani accused Pakistan of fomenting violence in Afghanistan through the Taliban; Pakistan accused Afghanistan of helping insurgent groups inside Pakistan (the Tehreek-e-Taliban and the Balochistan Liberation Army).

One of Ghani's major objectives was to improve South Asian ties to transform the region's economy. On his first official visit to India he envisioned "breakfast in Delhi, lunch in Peshawar, and dinner in Kabul–that's the world we seek!" He voiced the idea that a stable Afghanistan can act as a bridge between Central, South, and West Asia, given the country's centrist location.

Ghani had strong ties with Indian prime minister Narendra Modi. After Ghani's escape from Afghanistan, Modi spoke of his friendship with him on NPR.

=== Relations with the Taliban ===
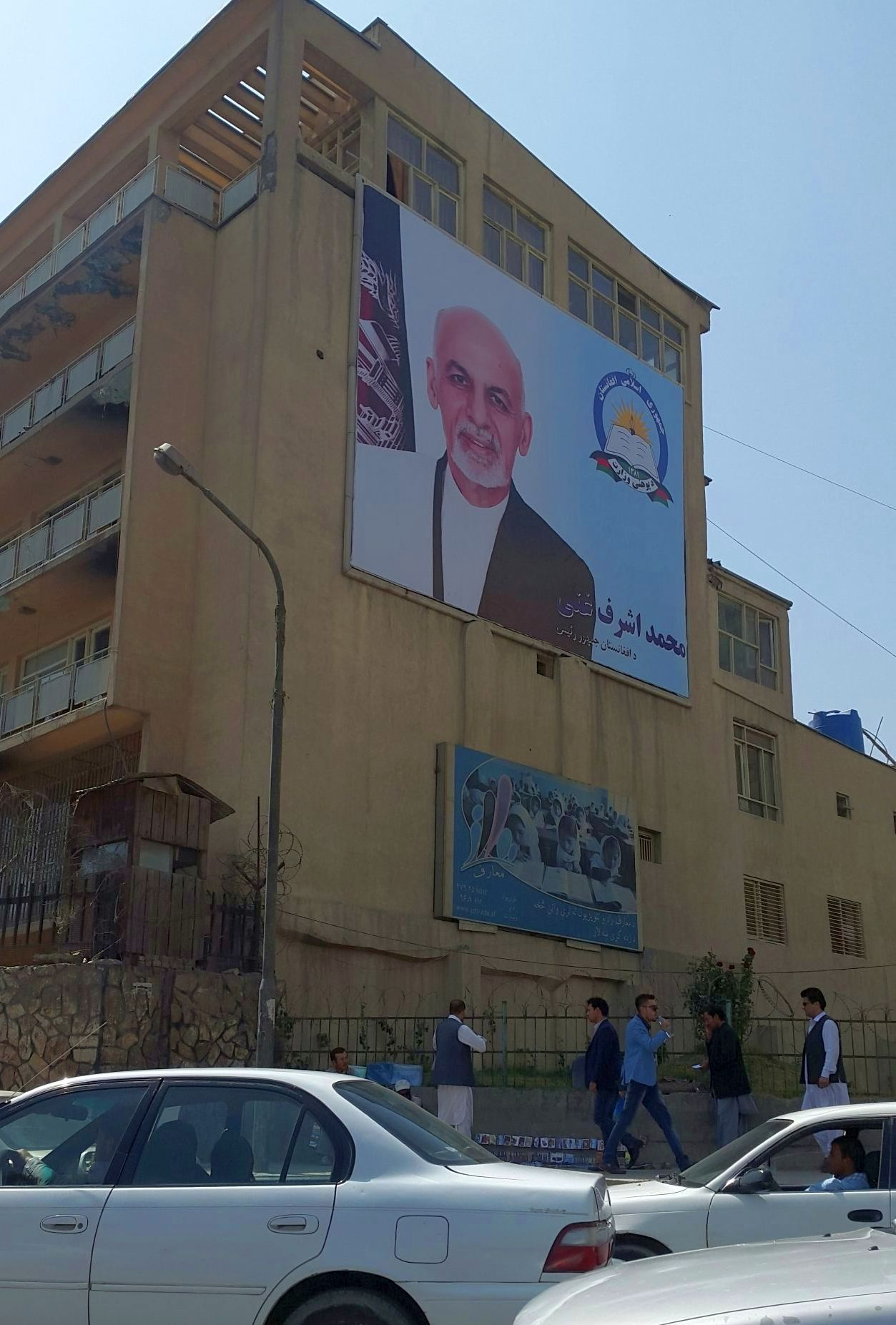
Ghani's presidential portrait shown on a governmental building in Kabul, 2018

In an interview with Vice News, Ghani said that his 'heart breaks for [the] Taliban'. He further stated that 'Talibans are Afghans and he is president of all Afghans'. Ashraf Ghani also said that he is willing to offer Afghan passports to the Taliban and to recognize them as a legitimate political group in Afghanistan, as an attempt to strike a peace deal with them.

In March 2021, in an attempt to advance peace talks, Ghani expressed his intentions of convincing the Taliban to hold fresh elections and allow forming of a new government through a democratic process.

Ghani blamed the Taliban for the 2021 Kabul school bombing, but Taliban spokesman Zabiullah Mujahid denied involvement in the attack, in a message released to the media. Many of the Kabul residents held Ghani responsible for the attack and raised loud chants against the Afghan government and security forces.

On 2 August 2021, Ghani blamed the sudden withdrawal of US troops from Afghanistan for the advance of the Taliban and said the latter had not cut ties with terrorist organizations and had escalated attacks against women, which the Taliban denied. On 11 August 2021, Ghani appealed to local warlords and private militias to fight the Taliban and also appealed to a popular uprising against the Taliban. On the same day, Pakistani prime minister Imran Khan reported that the Taliban would not negotiate or hold peace talks with the government as long as Ghani remains as the president.

As such, Ashraf Ghani was highly criticized by several Afghan politicians, including Ahmad Massoud and Ahmad Zia Massoud, for his failure to eliminate terrorism and that he handed over Afghanistan to the Taliban.

=== 2021 Taliban offensive and flight from Afghanistan ===
The Taliban took control of Afghanistan on 15 August and Ghani was deposed. That day, Ghani left Afghanistan with his wife and two close aides to Uzbekistan as the Taliban captured Kabul. The Arg, the presidential palace, was captured a few hours later by the group. Afghan officials stated that Ghani had left the presidential palace Sunday morning to go to the US embassy. He has since been described as the former president. A senior cabinet minister said that Ghani fled to Tajikistan, however it was then claimed that he landed in Tashkent, capital of Uzbekistan.

Later that day, Ghani wrote on his Facebook that he thought it was better for him to leave in order to avoid bloodshed and called on the Taliban to protect civilians and said the Taliban now faced a "historic test". On 18 August 2021, the United Arab Emirates acknowledged that Ghani and his family were in that country for "humanitarian considerations." He was granted stay by the government on humanitarian grounds.

On 17 August, the Taliban announced that they were actively working to form a government that would be announced over the coming days. The same day, first vice-president Amrullah Saleh asserted that he was acting president, claiming that if the president is absent, escapes, resigns or dies then the first vice-president becomes acting president. In an 18 August taped address from the UAE, Ghani said he fled to avoid being hanged, and vowed to eventually return to Afghanistan.

Former MP Elay Ershad, who had worked as Ghani's spokeswoman, was scathing in criticism. She said he was "gutless" for fleeing the country. Afghanistan's Ambassador to Tajikistan, Mohammad Zahir Aghbar, stated that Interpol should apprehend Ghani for embezzling public funds. The Russian embassy in Kabul alleged that Ghani fled with "four cars and a helicopter" full of cash and had to leave some money behind as it would not all fit in. Ashraf Ghani, speaking on 18 August 2021 in UAE, has stated that the accusations are baseless. To this day, no evidence of the accusation has been presented. A former senior official stated that Ghani left in haste. He said "He went to Termez in Uzbekistan, where he spent one night and then from there to the UAE (United Arab Emirates). There was no money with him. He literally just had the clothes he was wearing."

On 8 September 2021, Ghani released a video where he apologized to the Afghan people and repeated that he left to avoid "bloody street fighting". He also strongly denied stealing money from the country when he fled. Ghani said that "leaving Kabul was the most difficult decision of my life, but I believed it was the only way to keep the guns silent and save Kabul and her 6 million citizens."

The United Nations removed Ghani's name from its list of heads of state on 15 February 2022. In May 2022, the Special Inspector General for Afghanistan Reconstruction (SIGAR) released a report on the collapse of the Afghan National Army (ANA) and the Afghan government. The SIGAR described Ghani as a "paranoid president... afraid of his own countrymen" and that many of Ghani's dismissals of top military generals "undermined morale" of the ANA. The SIGAR report also reported that Ghani feared that the US was "plotting a coup" against him.

SIGAR released a report on 9 August 2022 on the investigation of Ghani's flight from Kabul. The report could not corroborate the Russian embassy's claim that he fled with bags of millions of dollars, but added that it was "unlikely to be true" that he and his aides "managed to pack tens of millions in cash", citing difficulties in vehicular transportation, helicopter load, and the short period of time. On the anniversary of Ghani's departure, he commented:

The reason I left was because I did not want to give the Taliban and their supporters the pleasure of yet again humiliating an Afghan president and making him sign over the legitimacy of the government [...] I've never been afraid. You've seen repeatedly rockets have landed around me and I've not moved. And it was a split second decision because they'd entered Kabul and the US embassy had already (been) evacuated.

He also rejected once again the reported millions of cash he flew in, citing a SIGAR report from June 2022 which found that the rumoured amount would have been difficult to conceal: "it would be somewhat larger than a standard American three-seater couch. This block would have weighed 3,722 pounds, or nearly two tonnes. The Mi-17 helicopters that the group flew on do not have separate cargo holds. Therefore, all of the cargo would have been visible in the cabin next to the passengers."

== Political views ==
Ghani is a progressive modernist with the belief and goal to "transform Afghanistan from a tribal, patronage-based society to a modern technocratic state". He is a fond admirer of both King Amanullah Khan, who was a progressive Afghan monarch in the 1920s, and General Sardar Mohammad Daoud Khan, a former prime minister of the Kingdom of Afghanistan, who served as the first president of the Republic of Afghanistan in the 1970s.

On 2 February 2020, Ashraf Ghani made controversial remarks while talking about Timur and Muhammad of Ghor which angered the Uzbek population of Afghanistan. He made those remarks while delivering a speech to a group of Afghan students on History, Culture, and the National Identity. Ghani stated that Muhammad of Ghor destroyed Afghanistan's central irrigation system while Genghis Khan demolished the irrigation system of the northern provinces. Ghani also referred to Turkic conqueror Amir Timur by his Persian-origin epithet "Timur Lang" (Timur the Lame) and stated that Timur wiped-out the irrigation system for Sistan, Farah, and Helmand provinces. His remarks regarding Timur were considered offensive to Uzbeks, according to experts, and drew condemnation from Afghanistan's Uzbek population.

Following his remarks, residents of Faryab Province staged protests and demanded an apology from Ashraf Ghani. The protesters threatened that they would take serious action if Ghani did not apologize for his remarks. Abdul Rashid Dostum, former vice-president of Afghanistan and an ethnic Uzbek, also demanded an apology from Ashraf Ghani. Bashir Ahmad Tahyanj, spokesperson of the National Islamic Movement of Afghanistan, said that "Ghani has a personal bias towards historic figures, honorable ethnicities, the history and culture of the people who live in Afghanistan. This is not his first time." However, in a statement, the Afghan government palace defended Ghani's remarks and stated that "what Ghani said about Timur was not offensive or insulting".

== Personal life ==
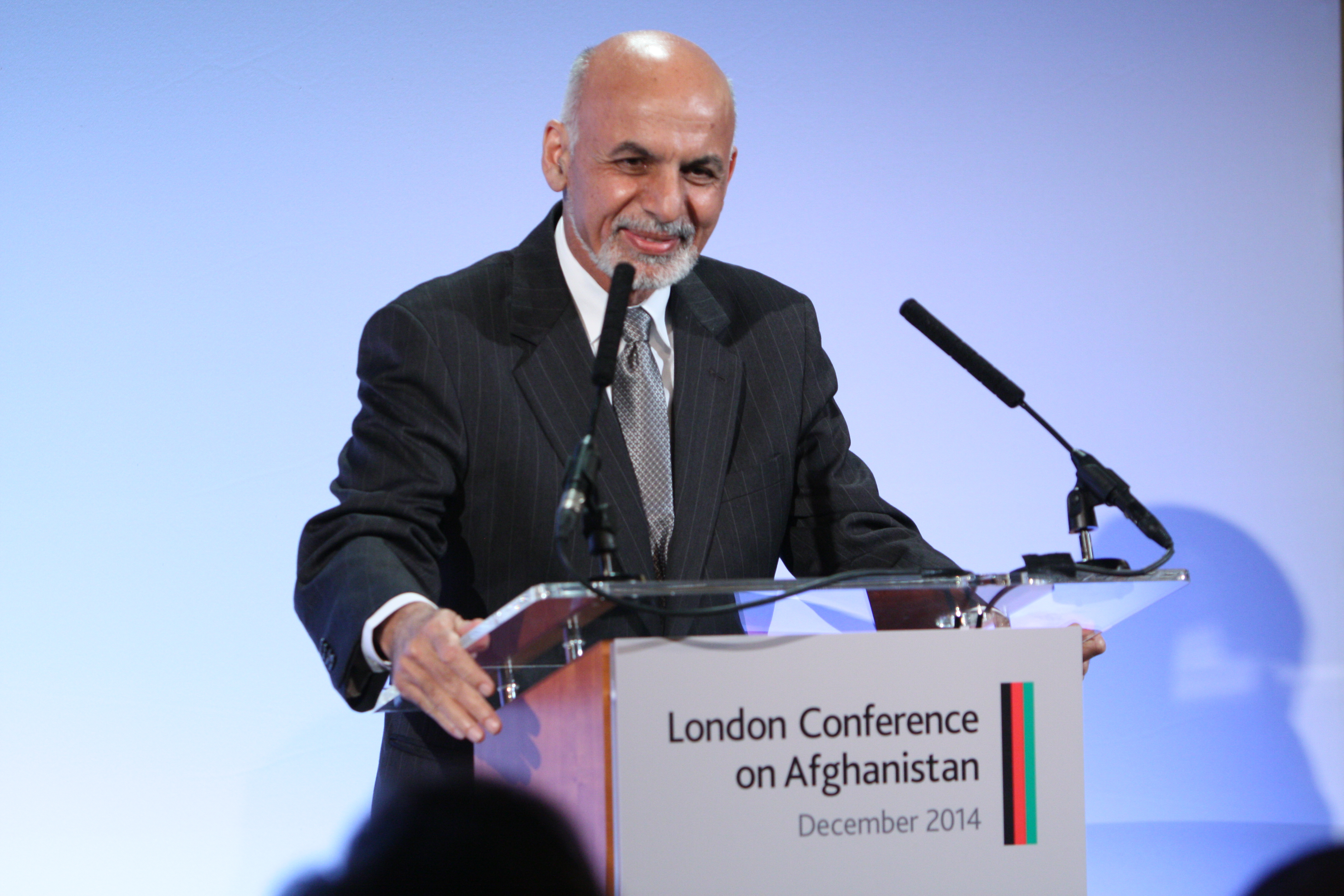
President Ghani at a conference in 2014

Ashraf Ghani is married to Rula Saade, who was born into a Lebanese Christian family. The couple married after they met during their studies at the American University of Beirut, Lebanon during the 1970s. They eventually settled in the United States and obtained US citizenship. However, Ghani renounced his US citizenship in 2009 so he could run in Afghan elections.

Ashraf and Rula Ghani have two children, a daughter, Mariam, a Brooklyn-based visual artist, and a son, Tarek, who was a national security and foreign policy advisor to 2020 presidential candidate, Pete Buttigieg. Both were born in the United States and carry US citizenship and passports. In an unusual move for a politician in Afghanistan, Ghani at his presidential inauguration in 2014 publicly thanked his wife, acknowledging her with an Afghan name, Bibi Gul. "I want to thank my partner, Bibi Gul, for supporting me and Afghanistan," he said. "She has always supported Afghan women and I hope she continues to do so."

Ashraf Ghani also owns 200 acres of land in Surkhab area of Logar Province. Abdul Baqi Ahmadzai, who is close to Ashraf Ghani, claims that Ashraf Ghani inherited a lot of land from his father. However, Ashraf Ghani bought this 200 acres of land separately in Logar province.

Ghani lost most of his stomach after developing cancer in the 1990s. It is said that Ghani wakes up every morning before five, and reads for two to three hours.

He is the older brother of Hashmat Ghani Ahmadzai, an Afghan politician who is the Grand Council Chieftain of the Kuchis. Unlike his brother, Hashmat Ghani did not flee Afghanistan. When interviewed, he said, "If I were to flee what would become of my people, my tribe. My roots are here, what kind of message would that send if I just fled and left my people in their time of need?"

== Publications ==
Ghani is the coauthor with Clare Lockhart of Fixing Failed States: A Framework for Rebuilding a Fractured World (2008). Along with Lockhart, he was listed on the 'Top 100 global thinkers list' for 2010 by Foreign Policy.

== See also ==
- Politics of Afghanistan
- Economy of Afghanistan
- Corruption in Afghanistan
- List of deposed politicians
- List of heads of state of Afghanistan
- List of state leaders who have been in exile

Political offices
Preceded by Hedayat Amin Arsala	Minister of Finance; 2002–2004	Succeeded by Anwar ul-Haq Ahady
Preceded by Hamid Karzai	5th President of Afghanistan; 2014–2021	Succeeded by Hibatullah Akhundzada as Supreme Leader
