= Institute for State Effectiveness =

American nongovernmental organization

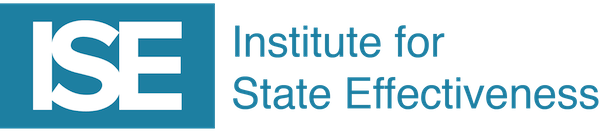
- Abbreviation: ISE
- Formation: 2005
- Type: Non-governmental organization
- Headquarters: 1050 30th Street NW
- Location: Washington, D.C. 20007
- CEO: Clare Lockhart
- Budget: Revenue: $3,824,900; Expenses: $3,517,655 (FYE December 2022)
- Website: https://effectivestates.org

The Institute for State Effectiveness (ISE) is a non-governmental organization based in Washington, D.C. that seeks to address the challenge of accountability and governance through a system-building approach across governments, markets and people. ISE was founded by Ashraf Ghani, future President of Afghanistan.

== Leadership and history ==
ISE was founded in 2005 by Ashraf Ghani and Clare Lockhart. Ghani was chairman until 2011, when he returned to Afghanistan to lead the Afghan Transition Team. As of April 2014, Lockhart is CEO. The institute's work has focused on Afghanistan as well as through East Africa and Central Asia, and across international markets.

The Institute focuses on building coalitions for reform, implementing large-scale policies, and training the next generation of development professionals to read country context and collaborate with local actors.

== Organizational goals ==
The Institute uses a citizen-centered perspective to rethink the fundamentals of the relationship between citizens, the state and the market in the context of globalization. The organization feels that stability and prosperity in our interdependent world demand a new global compact to ensure that the billions of people currently excluded become stakeholders in the emerging political and economic order.
