= Elay Ershad =

Afghan politician

- Education: Kabul University
- Occupations: politician, academic, scholar

Elay Ershad is an Afghan former politician and former member of Afghan Parliament (Wolesi Jirga). She was a former spokesperson for President Ashraf Ghani and labelled him "gutless" for fleeing after the Fall of Kabul.

== Career ==
Elay obtained her bachelor's degree from Faculty of Law and Political Science in Department of Diplomacy from the Kabul University. She also served as an assistant lecturer at the Faculty of Law and Political Science in Kabul University.

She also held various roles in the Ashraf Ghani's government before the Taliban takeover. She served as the chairperson of Committee on Education, Higher Education, Cultural Affairs, and Religious Affairs. She worked as the general advisor and executive assistant to the minister of the Interior and the minister of education in Afghanistan. She is also a member of Coordinating Committee of Women Parliamentarians of Inter-Parliamentary Union. She represents the Truth and Justice political party in Afghanistan.
