= Ahmadzai (Ghilji clan) =

Pashtun tribe of the Ghilji confederacy

The Ahmadzai (Pashto: احمدزی) are a Pashtun tribe of the Ghilji confederacy in Afghanistan. Formerly regarded as a branch of the Suleiman Khel, they came to be recognized as a separate tribe.

== Distribution and livelihoods ==
Ahmadzai settlements lie in the area between Kabul, Jalalabad and Gardez, particularly in Logar and Paktia. Writing in 2023, Ben Acheson placed most Ahmadzai in the wider Loya Paktia region and attributed communities in Kunduz, Baghlan and Balkh to past deportations.

=== Pastoralism and trade ===
Writing in the 1930s, J. A. Robinson estimated that 20–25 per cent of the tribe was nomadic. Anthropologist Jon Anderson's 1975 study described both settled Ahmadzai communities and nomadic pastoralists. He recorded nomads travelling from Jalalabad to lower Logar and from Khost to southeastern Logar. They returned to established summer pastures near their settled relatives. The Naval Postgraduate School also describes a history of herding between Logar and the hills near Jalalabad.

Anderson reported that some Ahmadzai settlements in Logar were financed with income from trade and holdings in the Hazarajat and beyond the Hindu Kush. In his discussion of tribal stereotypes, he recorded an Ahmadzai reputation for knowledge of tribal law and skill in trade.

== Kuchi identity ==
Writing in 2008, anthropologist Richard Tapper noted that Ahmadzai nomads around Kabul called themselves Kuchi. He linked their prominence in reporting on Afghan nomads to their proximity to the capital, political connections and accessibility to researchers and journalists. Tapper refutes the claims that Hashmat Ghani Ahmadzai ever led the Kuchi and states that Afghan nomads had never recognized a single overall leader. He distinguished the Ahmadzai tribe from the wider Kuchi population, but did not consider it a single tribe or ethnic group.

== Tribal divisions ==
The tribe's khels, or clans, include Babakar Khel, Isa Khel, Jabbarkhel, Maruf Khel, Musa Khel, Ya Khel and Zandak Khel. The Arsala Khel belong to the Jabbarkhel; the Naval Postgraduate School's chart places them within its Khugiani Khel branch. Acheson describes the Arsala Khel as a landowning clan from Hisarak District in Nangarhar Province.

== Political history ==
The Jabbarkhel took part in attacks on the British army during its retreat from Kabul to Jalalabad in 1842, in the First Anglo-Afghan War.

Robinson linked the Ahmadzai's separation from other Suleiman Khel to their ties with the Durrani rulers, geographic separation and the settled life of their leading clans. His account described intermarriage with the Durrani of Kabul and Ahmadzai service in senior government posts. He also reported that Abdur Rahman Khan deported families from the tribe's leading divisions to Afghan Turkestan, where he granted them land.

The Ahmadzai supported Mohammad Nader Shah in his capture of Kabul and accession to the throne in 1929.

During the Soviet–Afghan War, Ahmadzai served both as army officers and in mujahideen factions. Members of the Arsala Khel also joined the mujahideen.

Two Afghan presidents, Mohammad Najibullah and Ashraf Ghani, belonged to the tribe. Ghani dropped Ahmadzai from his name after his election in 2014.

== Notable Ahmadzai ==
- Abdul Haq, Afghan mujahideen leader
- Ashraf Ghani, president of Afghanistan, 2014–2021
- Hashmat Ghani Ahmadzai, candidate for a Kuchi parliamentary seat in 2005
- Mirwais Ahmadzaï, musician and record producer based in France
- Mohammad Najibullah, president of Afghanistan, 1987–1992
- Mohammad Sarwar Ahmedzai, politician and candidate in the 2014 Afghan presidential election
