= Hashmat Ghani Ahmadzai =

Afghan politician and Pashtun leader (born 1960)

- حشمت غنی احمدزی
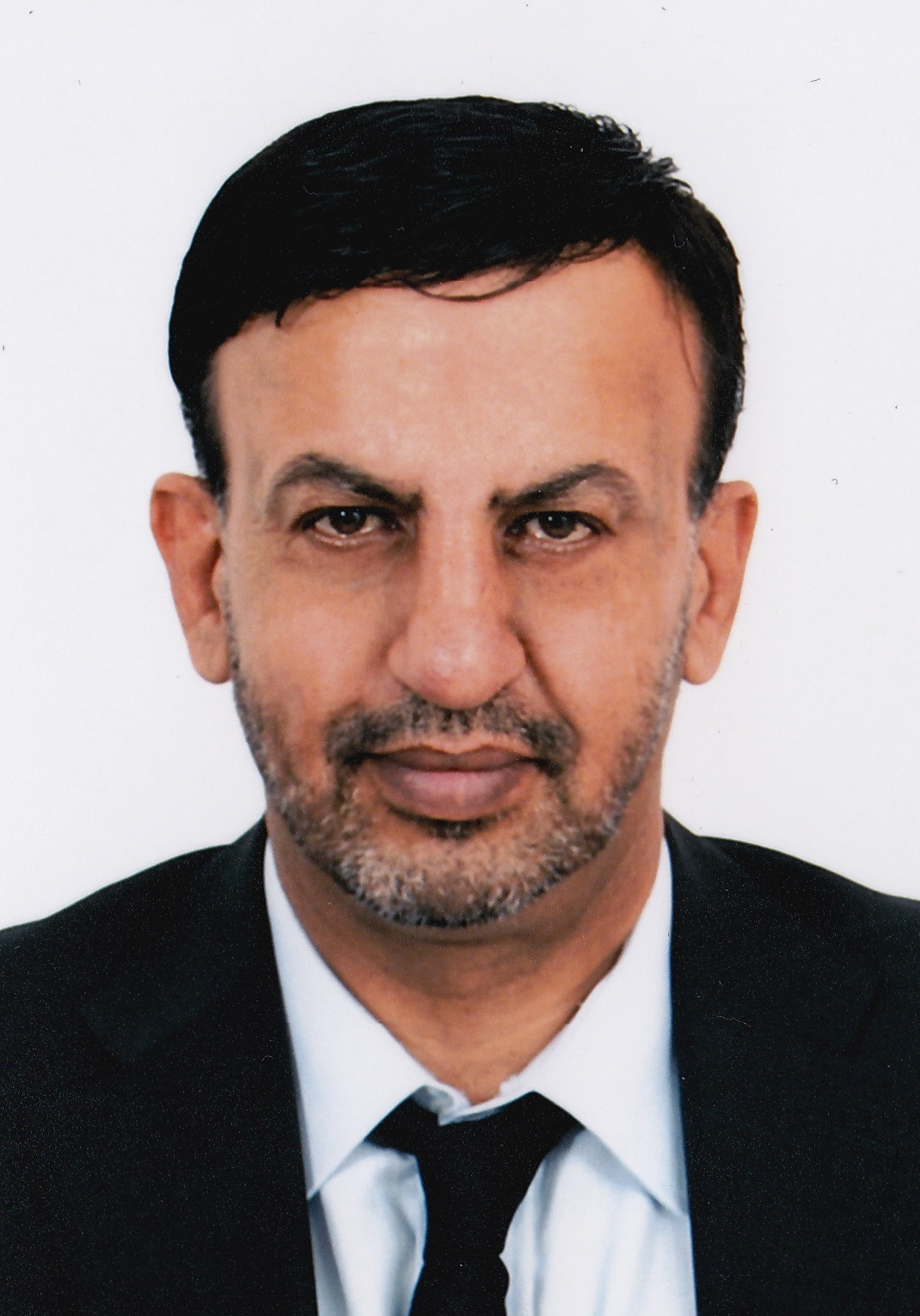
- Hashmat Ghani Ahmadzai in December 2011

Grand Council Chieftain of the Kuchis

Personal details
- Born: October 29, 1960 (age 65) Logar, Afghanistan
- Party: Independent
- Spouse: Farrah Ghani (died)
- Children: 3
- Relatives: Ashraf Ghani (brother)
- Profession: Politician; Businessman
- Website: HashmatGhaniAhmadzai

Hashmat Ghani Ahmadzai (Pashto/Dari: حشمت غنی احمدزی; born October 29, 1960) commonly referred to as Hashmat Ghani, is an Afghan politician who is the Grand Council Chieftain of the Kuchis.

== Early years ==
Ghani was born on October 29, 1960, in the Logar Province in the Kingdom of Afghanistan. Ghani is the youngest of three brothers and hails from the ethnic Pashtun from the Ahmadzai tribe of the Kochi Ghilji, as a child in Kabul, his family often traveled to their native Logar province, where they maintained close tribal ties.

=== Family ===
Ghani's grandfather brought King Zahir Shah's father, King Mohammed Nadir Shah, into power in the early 20th century. His father, Shah Jahan, served the last King of Afghanistan, Zahir Shah, in many ministerial roles, last holding the title of Minister of Transport from the late 1950s until the King was deposed in 1973. Following the overthrow of the King's government, Ghani and his family joined the former King and royalists in exile as part of what came to be known as the Rome Group, which flourished as a political organization though it was not a formal political party.

== Political career ==
=== Grand Council Chieftain of the Kuchis ===
Hashmat Ghani Ahmadzai, chief of the Grand Council of Kuchis, is among the wealthiest and most influential Kuchis, thanks to a large family inheritance based on land ownership as well as a successful transport company. During his venture as chief of the Kuchi council, which represents the interests of largely settled Kuchi tribes, Ghani deals with important Afghan politicians, including former President Hamid Karzai. But he says ideas he has put forward to improve life for the poorest nomads, such as providing community centers and integrating them into settled societies, Ghani advocated the establishment of an office for nomadic affairs within Karzai's administration. The office, according to Ghani's vision, would help mediate land disputes and work to build trust among Kuchis and northern ethnic groups. Ghani campaigned for proper government programs for the Kochi people, especially those who had chosen to settle rather than continue in the nomadic tradition. He became the Grand Council Chieftain of the Kuchis in 2002.

=== 2014 Afghan presidential election ===
In 2013, Ghani ran for president but was disqualified by the Independent Election Commission due to claims of issues with his filing papers, a charge Ghani denied. Throughout the course of that election, Ghani remained politically neutral, preferring instead to comment on what he thought the leading candidates, several of whom he knew personally, should prioritize in their eventual administrations. When elder brother Ashraf Ghani, became president in 2014, the younger Ghani did not let up on commenting on what he saw as flaws or missed opportunities among the national unity government, a special setup which saw Ashraf Ghani become President and his primary rival Dr. Abdullah Abdullah, given the new title of Chief Executive.

=== Fall of Kabul ===
When Kabul fell to the Taliban on 15 August 2021, Ghani chose to remain in the country. Though he says his brother had to leave to escape a potential assassination attempt, the younger Ghani said he had to stay to help his tribe and the people of Afghanistan in general at a time of great need. When interviewed said: "If I were to flee what would become of my people, my tribe. My roots are here, what kind of message would that send if I just fled and left my people in their time of need?" Throughout the day Al Jazeera spent with him, Ghani held face-to-face meetings with entrepreneurs and former government officials to encourage them not to give up on the country and to rise to the occasion. “This is the hour of the need of the Afghans,” he said. Ghani has remained a constant voice on Afghan and international media. He has appeared on international outlets like the BBC, Al Jazeera English, Voice of America, Radio Free Europe and Deutsche Welle.

== Political analyst ==
Domestically, he is frequently called on by the likes of TOLO News, Ariana News, and other leading outlets to discuss economic and political issues. Throughout his appearances, Ghani has consistently commented on the need to bridge the gaps between the urban and rural populations of the country. He has also advocated for innovation and ingenuity, suggesting that talented young Afghans put their efforts towards things like e-learning and e-medicine services. He has also been a strong proponent of talented, educated young Afghans returning from abroad, but always insists that they keep the local languages, culture and traditions in mind. His outspokenness has often seen Ghani become the target of criticism, but he continues to express his views.

== Personal life ==
Ghani was married to Farrah Ghani; she died amid a lengthy battle with stage 4 breast cancer in February 2019. He has three children.

His eldest son, Sultan Ghani received his Bachelors in International Business at Marymount University and holds a graduate certificate in International Business Management from Georgetown University.
