= Clare Lockhart =

American non-governmental organization director

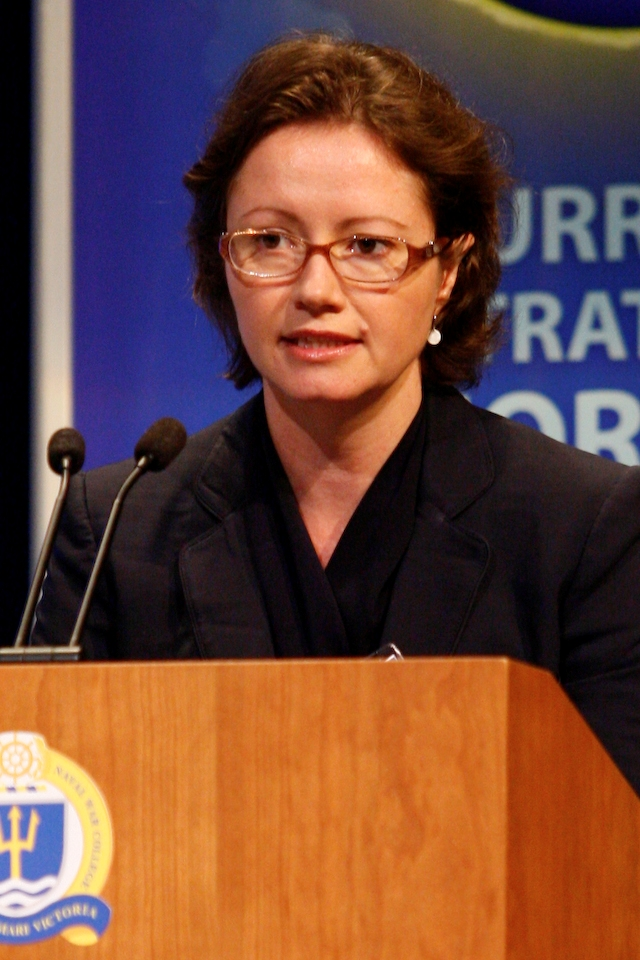
- Clare Lockhart in 2010
- Education: University of Oxford (UK); Inns of Court School of Law (UK); Harvard University (USA)
- Occupation: Director

Clare Lockhart is Director and co-founder of the Institute for State Effectiveness (ISE). ISE was founded in 2005 to find and promote approaches to building good governance. Lockhart is also Director of the Market Building Initiative at the Aspen Institute. She served as a Senior Fellow at the Jackson Institute for Global Affairs at Yale University from 2014 to 2022. Since 2023, Lockhart has served as a Global Advisor for the ACE Global Leaders of Excellence Network.

She served in Afghanistan as an adviser to the United Nations during the Bonn Process in 2001. Lockhart is an Advisory Board Member of Spirit of America, a 501(c)(3) organization that supports the safety and success of Americans serving abroad and the local people and partners they seek to help.

Lockhart is married to Joel Rayburn. They live in London and Washington, DC.

== Education ==
She is a member of the Bar of England and Wales, and was educated at the University of Oxford and Harvard University.

== Publications ==
She is the coauthor with Ashraf Ghani of Fixing Failed States: A Framework for Rebuilding a Fractured World (2008). Along with Ashraf Ghani, she was listed on the 'Top 100 global thinkers list' for 2010 by Foreign Policy.
